= Costume Designers Guild Award for Excellence in Sci-Fi/Fantasy Film =

Annual CDG film award

The Costume Designers Guild Award for Excellence in Sci-Fi/Fantasy Film is one of the annual awards given by the Costume Designers Guild.

The award was previously combined with Excellence in Period Film from 1999 to 2004, before being spun out into its own category in 2005. In 2017, the category was renamed from Excellence in Fantasy Film to its current name.

== Winners and nominees ==
=== 2000s ===
Excellence in Fantasy Film

| Year | Film | Costume Designer(s) |
|---|---|---|
| 2005 | The Chronicles of Narnia: The Lion, the Witch and the Wardrobe | Isis Mussenden |
| 2005 | Batman Begins | Lindy Hemming |
| 2005 | Charlie and the Chocolate Factory | Gabriella Pescucci |
| 2005 | Star Wars: Episode III – Revenge of the Sith | Trisha Biggar |
| 2006 | Pan's Labyrinth | Lala Huete |
| 2006 | Eragon | Kym Barrett |
| 2006 | The Fountain | Renée April |
| 2006 | V for Vendetta | Sammy Sheldon |
| 2006 | X-Men: The Last Stand | Judianna Makovsky |
| 2007 | The Golden Compass | Ruth Myers |
| 2007 | 300 | Michael Wilkinson |
| 2007 | Enchanted | Mona May |
| 2007 | Harry Potter and the Order of the Phoenix | Jany Temime |
| 2007 | Pirates of the Caribbean: At World's End | Penny Rose |
| 2008 | The Dark Knight | Lindy Hemming |
| 2008 | The Chronicles of Narnia: Prince Caspian | Isis Mussenden |
| 2008 | The Mummy: Tomb of the Dragon Emperor | Sanja Milkovic Hays |
| 2009 | The Imaginarium of Doctor Parnassus | Monique Prudhomme |
| 2009 | Avatar | Mayes C. Rubeo and Deborah Lynn Scott |
| 2009 | Star Trek | Michael Kaplan |

=== 2010s ===
| Year | Film | Costume Designer(s) |
|---|---|---|
| 2010 | Alice in Wonderland | Colleen Atwood |
| 2010 | The Tempest | Sandy Powell |
| 2010 | Tron: Legacy | Michael Wilkinson and Christine Bieselin Clark |
| 2011 | Harry Potter and the Deathly Hallows – Part 2 | Jany Temime |
| 2011 | Pirates of the Caribbean: On Stranger Tides | Penny Rose |
| 2011 | Red Riding Hood | Cindy Evans |
| 2011 | Thor | Alexandra Byrne |
| 2011 | X-Men: First Class | Sammy Sheldon |
| 2012 | Mirror Mirror | Eiko Ishioka |
| 2012 | Cloud Atlas | Kym Barrett and Pierre-Yves Gayraud |
| 2012 | The Hobbit: An Unexpected Journey | Bob Buck, Ann Maskrey and Richard Taylor |
| 2012 | The Hunger Games | Judianna Makovsky |
| 2012 | Snow White and the Huntsman | Colleen Atwood |
| 2013 | The Hunger Games: Catching Fire | Trish Summerville |
| 2013 | The Hobbit: The Desolation of Smaug | Bob Buck, Ann Maskrey and Richard Taylor |
| 2013 | Oz the Great and Powerful | Gary Jones and Michael Kutsche |
| 2014 | Into the Woods | Colleen Atwood |
| 2014 | Guardians of the Galaxy | Alexandra Byrne |
| 2014 | The Hobbit: The Battle of the Five Armies | Bob Buck, Ann Maskrey and Richard Taylor |
| 2014 | The Hunger Games: Mockingjay – Part 1 | Kurt & Bart |
| 2014 | Maleficent | Anna B. Sheppard and Jane Clive |
| 2015 | Mad Max: Fury Road | Jenny Beavan |
| 2015 | Cinderella | Sandy Powell |
| 2015 | Ex Machina | Sammy Sheldon |
| 2015 | The Hunger Games: Mockingjay – Part 2 | Kurt & Bart |
| 2015 | Star Wars: The Force Awakens | Michael Kaplan |
| 2016 | Doctor Strange | Alexandra Byrne |
| 2016 | Fantastic Beasts and Where to Find Them | Colleen Atwood |
| 2016 | Kubo and the Two Strings | Deborah Cook |
| 2016 | Miss Peregrine's Home for Peculiar Children | Colleen Atwood |
| 2016 | Rogue One: A Star Wars Story | David Crossman and Glyn Dillon |

Excellence in Sci-Fi/Fantasy Film

| Year | Film | Costume Designer(s) |
|---|---|---|
| 2017 | Wonder Woman | Lindy Hemming |
| 2017 | Beauty and the Beast | Jacqueline Durran |
| 2017 | Blade Runner 2049 | Renée April |
| 2017 | Star Wars: The Last Jedi | Michael Kaplan |
| 2017 | Thor: Ragnarok | Mayes C. Rubeo |
| 2018 | Black Panther | Ruth E. Carter |
| 2018 | Aquaman | Kym Barrett |
| 2018 | Avengers: Infinity War | Judianna Makovsky |
| 2018 | The Nutcracker and the Four Realms | Jenny Beavan |
| 2018 | A Wrinkle in Time | Paco Delgado |
| 2019 | Maleficent: Mistress of Evil | Ellen Mirojnick |
| 2019 | Aladdin | Michael Wilkinson |
| 2019 | Avengers: Endgame | Judianna Makovsky |
| 2019 | Captain Marvel | Sanja M. Hays |
| 2019 | Star Wars: The Rise of Skywalker | Michael Kaplan |

=== 2020s ===
| Year | Film | Costume Designer(s) |
|---|---|---|
| 2020 | Mulan | Bina Daigeler |
| 2020 | Dolittle | Jenny Beavan |
| 2020 | Jingle Jangle: A Christmas Journey | Michael Wilkinson |
| 2020 | Pinocchio | Massimo Cantini Parrini |
| 2020 | Wonder Woman 1984 | Lindy Hemming |
| 2021 | Dune | Jacqueline West and Robert Morgan |
| 2021 | The Green Knight | Malgosia Turzanska |
| 2021 | The Matrix Resurrections | Lindsay Pugh |
| 2021 | Shang-Chi and the Legend of the Ten Rings | Kym Barrett |
| 2021 | Spider-Man: No Way Home | Sanja M. Hays |
| 2021 | The Suicide Squad | Judianna Makovsky |
| 2022 | Everything Everywhere All at Once | Shirley Kurata |
| 2022 | Avatar: The Way of Water | Deborah L. Scott |
| 2022 | Black Panther: Wakanda Forever | Ruth E. Carter |
| 2022 | Hocus Pocus 2 | Salvador Perez |
| 2022 | Thor: Love and Thunder | Mayes C. Rubeo |
| 2023 | Barbie | Jacqueline Durran |
| 2023 | Haunted Mansion | Jeffrey Kurland |
| 2023 | The Hunger Games: The Ballad of Songbirds & Snakes | Trish Summerville |
| 2023 | The Little Mermaid | Colleen Atwood and Christine Cantella |
| 2023 | Rebel Moon – Part One: A Child of Fire | Stephanie Porter |
| 2024 | Wicked | Paul Tazewell |
| 2024 | Beetlejuice Beetlejuice | Colleen Atwood |
| 2024 | Borderlands | Daniel Orlandi |
| 2024 | Dune: Part Two | Jacqueline West |
| 2024 | Furiosa: A Mad Max Saga | Jenny Beavan |
| 2025 | Wicked: For Good | Paul Tazewell |
| 2025 | Avatar: Fire and Ash | Deborah Lynn Scott |
| 2025 | How to Train Your Dragon | Lindsay Pugh |
| 2025 | Thunderbolts* | Sanja Milkovic Hays |
| 2025 | Tron: Ares | Christine Bieselin Clark and Alix Friedberg |

== Designers with multiple wins ==
2 wins

- Colleen Atwood
- Lindy Hemming
- Paul Tazewell

== Designers with multiple nominations ==
7 nominations

- Colleen Atwood

5 nominations

- Judianna Makovsky

4 nominations

- Kym Barrett
- Jenny Beavan
- Alexandra Byrne
- Sanja M. Hays
- Lindy Hemming
- Michael Kaplan
- Michael Wilkinson

3 nominations

- Bob Buck
- Ann Maskrey
- Mayes C. Rubeo
- Sammy Sheldon Differ
- Deborah Lynn Scott
- Richard Taylor

2 nominations

- Renée April
- Christine Bieselin Clark
- Ruth E. Carter
- Jacqueline Durran
- Kurt & Bart
- Isis Mussenden
- Sandy Powell
- Lindsay Pugh
- Penny Rose
- Trish Summerville
- Paul Tazewell
- Jany Temime
- Jacqueline West
