= 18th Costume Designers Guild Awards =

Award ceremony for film and television costuming in 2015

- Date: February 23, 2016
- Location: The Beverly Hilton, Beverly Hills, California
- Country: United States
- Presented by: Costume Designers Guild
- Hosted by: Betsy Brandt

Highlights
- Excellence in Contemporary Film: Beasts of No Nation – Jenny Eagan
- Excellence in Fantasy Film: Mad Max: Fury Road – Jenny Beavan
- Excellence in Period Film: The Danish Girl – Paco Delgado

The 18th Costume Designers Guild Awards, honouring the best costume designs in film and television for 2015, were given in 2016. The nominees were announced on January 7, 2016.

== Winners and nominees ==
The winners are in bold.

=== Film ===
Excellence in Contemporary Film	Excellence in Period Film
**Beasts of No Nation – Jenny Eagan**; Joy – Michael Wilkinson; Kingsman: The Secret Service – Arianne Phillips; The Martian – Janty Yates; Youth – Carlo Poggioli	**The Danish Girl – Paco Delgado**; Brooklyn – Odile Dicks-Mireaux; Carol – Sandy Powell; Crimson Peak – Kate Hawley; Trumbo – Daniel Orlandi
Excellence in Fantasy Film
**Mad Max: Fury Road – Jenny Beavan**; Cinderella – Sandy Powell; Ex Machina – Sammy Sheldon Differ; The Hunger Games: Mockingjay – Part 2 – Kurt & Bart; Star Wars: The Force Awakens – Michael Kaplan

=== Television ===
Outstanding Contemporary Television	Outstanding Period Television
**American Horror Story: Hotel – Lou Eyrich**; Empire, Season 1 – Rita McGhee; House of Cards – Johanna Argan and Kemal Harris; Ray Donovan – Christopher Lawrence; Transparent – Marie Schley	**The Knick – Ellen Mirojnick**; Mad Men – Janie Bryant and Tiffany White Stanton; Masters of Sex – Isis Mussenden; Outlander – Terry Dresbach; Penny Dreadful – Gabriella Pescucci
Outstanding Fantasy Television
**Game of Thrones – Michele Clapton**; Once Upon a Time – Eduardo Castro; Sleepy Hollow, Season 2 – Kristin M. Burke and Mairi Chisholm; Sleepy Hollow, Season 3 – Mairi Chisholm; The Wiz Live! – Paul Tazewell

=== Commercial ===
Excellence in Short Form Design
- **"The Most Interesting Man in the World Wins on Land, Sea & Air", Dos Equis Commercial – Julie Vogel**
  - "And So It Begins", Old Spice Commercial – Mindy Le Brock
  - "From the Makers of Happy & Merry, H&M Presents Katy Perry" Commercial – B. Åkerlund
  - The Hobbit: Kingdoms of Middle-earth – Dance Battle, Video Game, Kaboom/Warner Interactive Commercial – Soyon An
  - Kevin Spacey, E-Trade Commercial – Johanna Argan

=== Special awards ===
==== Career Achievement Award ====
- Ellen Mirojnick

==== LACOSTE Spotlight Award ====
- Cate Blanchett

==== Distinguished Collaborator Award ====
- Quentin Tarantino

==== Distinguished Service Award ====
- Edwina Pellikka
