= 28th Costume Designers Guild Awards =

Award ceremony for film and television costuming in 2025

- Date: February 12, 2026
- Location: Ebell of Los Angeles, California
- Country: United States
- Presented by: Costume Designers Guild
- Hosted by: Courtney Hope

Highlights
- Excellence in Contemporary Film: One Battle After Another – Colleen Atwood
- Excellence in Period Film: Frankenstein – Kate Hawley
- Excellence in Sci-Fi/Fantasy Film: Wicked: For Good – Paul Tazewell

The 28th Costume Designers Guild Awards, honoring excellence in film, television, and short form costume design for 2025, were held on February 12, 2026, at the Ebell of Los Angeles.

The nominations were announced on December 12, 2025. Multiple nominations went to Apple TV comedy series Palm Royale and the horror films Weapons and Sinners, all with two each. American costume designer Colleen Atwood was the most nominated individual with three nominations, followed by Lindsay Pugh and Steven Norman Lee with two each.

Kate Hudson was presented with the Spotlight Award.

== Winners and nominees ==
Winners will listed first and in bold.

=== Film ===
Excellence in Contemporary Film	Excellence in Period Film	Excellence in Sci-Fi/Fantasy Film
**One Battle After Another – Colleen Atwood**; Bugonia – Jennifer Johnson; F1 – Julian Day; Wake Up Dead Man: A Knives Out Mystery – Jenny Eagan; Weapons – Trish Summerville	**Frankenstein – Kate Hawley**; Downton Abbey: The Grand Finale – Anna Mary Scott Robbins; Hamnet – Malgosia Turzanska; Hedda – Lindsay Pugh; Sinners – Ruth E. Carter	**Wicked: For Good – Paul Tazewell**; Avatar: Fire and Ash – Deborah Lynn Scott; How to Train Your Dragon – Lindsay Pugh; Thunderbolts* – Sanja Milkovic Hays; Tron: Ares – Christine Bieselin Clark and Alix Friedberg

=== Television ===
Excellence in Contemporary Television	Excellence in Period Television
**The Studio: "CinemaCon" – Kameron Lennox (Apple TV)**; Emily in Paris: "Veni, Vidi, Venezia" – Marylin Fitoussi (Netflix); Hacks: "Heaven" – Kathleen Felix-Hager (HBO Max); The Righteous Gemstones: "You Hurled Me Into the Very Heart of the Seas" – Christina Flannery (HBO); Wednesday: "Woe Me the Money" – Colleen Atwood and Mark Sutherland (Netflix)	**Palm Royale: "Maxine Is Ready to Single Mingle" – Alix Friedberg and Leigh Bell (Apple TV)**; 1923: "A Dream and a Memory" – Janie Bryant and Gaby Acosta (Paramount+); Chief of War: "City of Flowers" – Caroline Eselin-Schaefer (Apple TV); The Gilded Age: "Marriage Is a Gamble" – Kasia Walicka Maimone (HBO); House of Guinness: "Episode 4" – Edward K. Gibbon (Netflix)
Excellence in Sci-Fi/Fantasy Television	Excellence in Variety, Reality-Competition, and Live Television
**Andor: "Harvest" – Michael Wilkinson (Disney+)**; Black Mirror: "USS Callister: Into Infinity" – Matthew Price (Netflix); Murderbot: "FreeCommerce" – Carrie Grace and Laura Jean Shannon (Apple TV); The Wheel of Time: "He Who Comes with the Dawn" – Sharon Gilham (Prime Video); The Witcher: "Baptism of Fire" – Lucinda Wright (Netflix)	**Saturday Night Live 50th Anniversary Special – Tom Broecker, Cristina Natividad, and Ashley Dudek (NBC)**; Dancing with the Stars: "Premiere" – Steven Norman Lee and Daniela Gschwendtner (ABC); The Masked Singer: "The Lucky 6: Merging of the Masks" – Steven Norman Lee and Luke D'Alessandro (Fox); The Traitors: "Til Death Us Do Part" – Sam Spector and Rikki Finlay (Peacock); Wicked: One Wonderful Night – Katja Cahill (NBC)

=== Short Form and Illustration ===
Excellence in Short Form Design	Excellence in Costume Illustration
**Dandyland: "Episode 10" – Rafaella Rabinovich (TIE)**; **Uber Eats: "A Century of Cravings – Super Bowl" – Michelle Martini (TIE)**; AirPods 4: "Someday by Spike Jonze" – Kym Barrett; Lady Gaga: "The Dead Dance" – Colleen Atwood; State Farm: "Batman vs. Bateman" – Anette Cseri	**Sinners – Felipe Sanchez**; On Swift Horses – Eduardo Lucero; Palm Royale – Oksana Nedavniaya (Apple TV); Weapons – Oksana Nedavniaya

=== Special awards ===
==== Career Achievement Award ====
- Michelle Cole

==== Distinguished Collaborator Award ====
- James Cameron

==== Spotlight Award ====
- Kate Hudson

==== Vanguard Spotlight Award ====
- Teyana Taylor
