= 24th Costume Designers Guild Awards =

Award ceremony for film and television costuming in 2021

- Date: March 9, 2022
- Location: The Broad Stage, Santa Monica, California
- Country: United States
- Presented by: Costume Designers Guild
- Hosted by: Andrew Rannells; Casey Wilson

Highlights
- Excellence in Contemporary Film: Coming 2 America – Ruth E. Carter
- Excellence in Period Film: Cruella – Jenny Beavan
- Excellence in Sci-Fi/Fantasy Film: Dune – Jacqueline West and Robert Morgan

The 24th Costume Designers Guild Awards, honoring the best costume designs in film, television, and media for 2021, was held on March 9, 2022. The nominees were announced on January 26, 2022.

== Winners and nominees ==
The winners are in bold.

=== Film ===
Excellence in Contemporary Film	Excellence in Period Film
**Coming 2 America – Ruth E. Carter**; Don't Look Up – Susan Matheson; In the Heights – Mitchell Travers; No Time to Die – Suttirat Anne Larlarb; Zola – Derica Cole Washington	**Cruella – Jenny Beavan**; Cyrano – Massimo Cantini Parrini and Jacqueline Durran; House of Gucci – Janty Yates; Nightmare Alley – Luis Sequeira; West Side Story – Paul Tazewell
Excellence in Sci-Fi/Fantasy Film
**Dune – Jacqueline West and Robert Morgan**; The Green Knight – Malgosia Turzanska; The Matrix Resurrections – Lindsay Pugh; Shang-Chi and the Legend of the Ten Rings – Kym Barrett; Spider-Man: No Way Home – Sanja M. Hays; The Suicide Squad – Judianna Makovsky

=== Television ===
Excellence in Contemporary Television	Excellence in Period Television
**Emily in Paris: "French Revolution" – Patricia Field and Marylin Fitoussi (Netflix)**; Euphoria: "Fuck Anyone Who's Not a Sea Blob" – Heidi Bivens (HBO); Hacks: "Pilot" – Kathleen Felix-Hager (HBO Max); Mare of Easttown: "Miss Ladyhawk Herself" – Meghan Kasperlik (HBO); Squid Game: "VIPS" – Jo Sang-gyeong (Netflix)	**The Great: "Seven Days" – Sharon Long (Hulu)**; Halston: "Becoming Halston" – Jeriana San Juan (Netflix); The Underground Railroad: "Chapter 8: Indiana Autumn" – Caroline Eselin-Schaefer (Prime Video); WandaVision: "Filmed Before a Live Studio Audience" – Mayes C. Rubeo (Disney+); What We Do in the Shadows: "The Wellness Center" – Laura Montgomery (FX)
Excellence in Sci-Fi/Fantasy Television	Excellence in Variety, Reality-Competition, Live Television
**The Book of Boba Fett: "Stranger in a Strange Land" – Shawna Trpcic (Disney+)**; The Handmaid's Tale: "Nightshade" – Debra Hanson (Hulu); Loki: "Journey into Mystery" – Christine Wada (Disney+); What We Do in the Shadows: "Gail" – Laura Montgomery (FX); The Witcher: "Family" – Lucinda Wright (Netflix)	**Saturday Night Live: "Rami Malek / Young Thug" – Tom Broecker and Eric Justian (NBC)**; Annie Live! – Emilio Sosa (ABC); Dancing with the Stars: "Semi-Finals" – Daniela Gschwendtner and Steven Norman Lee (ABC); The Late Late Show with James Corden: "Crosswalk Cinderella" – Lauren Shapiro (CBS); The Masked Singer: "2 Night Season Premiere, Part 2: Back to School" – Marina Toybina and Gabrielle Letamendi (Fox)

=== Short Form ===
Excellence in Short Form Design
- **Swarovski: "Welcome to Wonderlab" (Commercial) – B. Åkerlund**
  - The Bold Type: Cruella (Commercial) – Mandi Line
  - Cadillac: Edgar Scissorhands ft. Timothée Chalamet, "Hands Free" (Commercial) – Melissa DesRosiers
  - Ed Sheeran: "Shivers" (Music Video) – Ami Goodheart
  - Snoop Dogg's Triller: Fight Club "We're Bringing Boxing Back" (Commercial) – Dawn Ritz

=== Special awards ===
==== Career Achievement Award ====
- Sharen Davis

==== Spotlight Award ====
- Andrew Garfield

==== Distinguished Collaborator Award ====
- Amy Pascal and Rachel O’Connor

==== Hall of Fame ====
- Anthony Powell
