= 20th Costume Designers Guild Awards =

Award ceremony for film and television costuming in 2017

- Date: February 20, 2018
- Location: The Beverly Hilton, Beverly Hills, California
- Country: United States
- Presented by: Costume Designers Guild
- Hosted by: Gina Rodriguez

Highlights
- Excellence in Contemporary Film: I, Tonya – Jennifer Johnson
- Excellence in Period Film: The Shape of Water – Luis Sequeira
- Excellence in Sci-Fi/Fantasy Film: Wonder Woman – Lindy Hemming

The 20th Costume Designers Guild Awards, honoring the best costume designs in film and television for 2017, took place on February 20, 2018. The nominees were announced on January 10, 2018.

== Winners and nominees ==
The winners are in bold.

=== Film ===
| Excellence in Contemporary Film | Excellence in Period Film |
|---|---|
| **I, Tonya – Jennifer Johnson**; Get Out – Nadine Haders; Kingsman: The Golden Circle – Arianne Phillips; Lady Bird – April Napier; Three Billboards Outside Ebbing, Missouri – Melissa Toth | **The Shape of Water – Luis Sequeira**; Dunkirk – Jeffrey Kurland; The Greatest Showman – Ellen Mirojnick; Murder on the Orient Express – Alexandra Byrne; Phantom Thread – Mark Bridges |
Excellence in Sci-Fi/Fantasy Film
**Wonder Woman – Lindy Hemming**; Beauty and the Beast – Jacqueline Durran; Blade Runner 2049 – Renée April; Star Wars: The Last Jedi – Michael Kaplan; Thor: Ragnarok – Mayes C. Rubeo

=== Television ===
| Excellence in Contemporary Television | Excellence in Period Television |
|---|---|
| **The Handmaid's Tale – Ane Crabtree**; American Horror Story: Cult – Sarah Evelyn Bram; Big Little Lies – Alix Friedberg; Grace and Frankie – Allyson B. Fanger; The Young Pope – Luca Canfora and Carlo Poggioli | **The Crown – Jane Petrie**; Feud: Bette and Joan – Lou Eyrich; GLOW – Beth Morgan; The Marvelous Mrs. Maisel – Donna Zakowska; Stranger Things – Kim Wilcox |
Excellence in Sci-Fi/Fantasy Television
**Game of Thrones – Michele Clapton**; Black Mirror: USS Callister – Maja Meschede; Once Upon a Time – Eduardo Castro and Dan Lester; Sleepy Hollow – Mairi Chisholm; Star Trek: Discovery – Gersha Phillips

=== Short Form ===
Excellence in Short Form Design
- **P!nk: "Beautiful Trauma" Music Video – Kim Bowen**
  - Assassin's Creed: "I Am" Commercial – Patrik Milani
  - Elton John feat. Marilyn Manson: "Tiny Dancer" Music Video – Sara Sensoy and Dawn Ritz
  - Katy Perry: "Chained to the Rhythm" Music Video – B. Ăkerlund
  - Miu Miu: "Women's Tales #14: The End of History Illusion" – Mindy Le Brock

=== Special awards ===
==== Career Achievement Award ====
- Joanna Johnston

==== Spotlight Award ====
- Kerry Washington

==== Distinguished Collaborator Award ====
- Guillermo del Toro

==== Distinguished Service Award ====
- Maggie Schpak

==== Hall of Fame ====
- John Mollo
