= 11th Costume Designers Guild Awards =

Award ceremony for film and television costuming in 2008

- Date: February 17, 2009
- Location: Beverly Wilshire Hotel, Beverly Hills, California
- Country: United States
- Presented by: Costume Designers Guild
- Hosted by: Debra Messing

Highlights
- Excellence in Contemporary Film: Slumdog Millionaire – Suttirat Anne Larlarb
- Excellence in Fantasy Film: The Dark Knight – Lindy Hemming
- Excellence in Period Film: The Duchess – Michael O'Connor

The 11th Costume Designers Guild Awards, honouring the best costume designs in film and television for 2008, were given on February 17, 2009. The nominees were announced on January 13, 2009.

== Winners and nominees ==
The winners are in bold.

=== Film ===
Excellence in Contemporary Film	Excellence in Period Film
**Slumdog Millionaire – Suttirat Larlarb**; Iron Man – Rebecca Bentjen and Laura Jean Shannon; Mamma Mia! – Ann Roth; Sex and the City – Patricia Field; The Wrestler – Amy Westcott	**The Duchess – Michael O'Connor**; Changeling – Deborah Hopper; The Curious Case of Benjamin Button – Jacqueline West; Milk – Danny Glicker; Revolutionary Road – Albert Wolsky
Excellence in Fantasy Film
**The Dark Knight – Lindy Hemming**; The Chronicles of Narnia: Prince Caspian – Isis Mussenden; The Mummy: Tomb of the Dragon Emperor – Sanja Milkovic Hays

=== Television ===
Outstanding Contemporary Television	Outstanding Period/Fantasy Television
**Ugly Betty – Eduardo Castro and Patricia Field**; 30 Rock – Tom Broecker; Dancing with the Stars – Randall Christensen; Entourage – Amy Westcott; Gossip Girl – Eric Daman	**Mad Men – Katherine Jane Bryant**; Pushing Daisies – Robert Blackman; The Tudors – Joan Bergin
Outstanding Made for Television Movie or Miniseries
**John Adams – Donna Zakowska**; Bernard and Doris – Joseph G. Aulisi; Coco Chanel – Stefano De Nardis; Cranford – Jenny Beavan; Sense and Sensibility – Michele Clapton

=== Commercial ===
Excellence in Commercial Design
- **Milk, "White Gold" – Casey Storm**
  - Levi's, "HIS" – Kym Barrett
  - NIKE, "Fate" – Donna Zakowska

=== Special awards ===
==== Career Achievement Award ====
- Marilyn Vance (film)
- Van Broughton Ramsey (television)

==== Swarovski President’s Award ====
- Michael Douglas

==== Distinguished Collaborator Award ====
- James Burrows
