= 17th Costume Designers Guild Awards =

Award ceremony for film and television costuming in 2014

- Date: February 17, 2015
- Location: The Beverly Hilton, Beverly Hills, California
- Country: United States
- Presented by: Costume Designers Guild
- Hosted by: Emmy Rossum

Highlights
- Excellence in Contemporary Film: Birdman or (The Unexpected Virtue of Ignorance) – Albert Wolsky
- Excellence in Fantasy Film: Into the Woods – Colleen Atwood
- Excellence in Period Film: The Grand Budapest Hotel – Milena Canonero

The 17th Costume Designers Guild Awards, honouring the best costume designs in film and television for 2014, were given in 2015. The nominees were announced on January 7, 2015.

== Winners and nominees ==
The winners are in bold.

=== Film ===
Excellence in Contemporary Film	Excellence in Period Film
**Birdman or (The Unexpected Virtue of Ignorance) – Albert Wolsky**; Boyhood – Kari Perkins; Gone Girl – Trish Summerville; Interstellar – Mary Zophres; Wild – Melissa Bruning	**The Grand Budapest Hotel – Milena Canonero**; The Imitation Game – Sammy Sheldon Differ; Inherent Vice – Mark Bridges; Selma – Ruth E. Carter; The Theory of Everything – Steven Noble
Excellence in Fantasy Film
**Into the Woods – Colleen Atwood**; Guardians of the Galaxy – Alexandra Byrne; The Hobbit: The Battle of the Five Armies – Bob Buck, Ann Maskrey and Richard Taylor; The Hunger Games: Mockingjay – Part 1 – Kurt & Bart; Maleficent – Anna B. Sheppard and Jane Clive

=== Television ===
Outstanding Contemporary Television	Outstanding Period/Fantasy Television
**True Detective – Jenny Eagan**; House of Cards – Johanna Argan; Ray Donovan – Christopher Lawrence; Scandal – Lyn Paolo; Saturday Night Live – Tom Broecker and Eric Justian	**Game of Thrones – Michele Clapton**; Boardwalk Empire – John Dunn; The Knick – Ellen Mirojnick; Mad Men – Janie Bryant; Masters of Sex – Ane Crabtree
Outstanding Made for Television Movie or Miniseries
**American Horror Story: Freak Show – Lou Eyrich**; Houdini – Birgit Hutter; The Normal Heart – Daniel Orlandi; Olive Kitteridge – Jenny Eagan; Sherlock – Sarah Arthur

=== Commercial ===
Excellence in Commercial Design
- **Army "Defy Expectations, Villagers" – Christopher Lawrence**
  - DirecTV "Less Attractive" with Rob Lowe – Mindy Le Brock and Jessica Albertson
  - Dos Equis "The Most Interesting Man in the World Walks on Fire" – Julie Vogel
  - Kia Soul Hamster Commercial feat. "Animal" – Anette Cseri
  - Smirnoff "The Mixologist" – Laura Jean Shannon

=== Special awards ===
==== Career Achievement Award ====
- Aggie Guerard Rodgers

==== LACOSTE Spotlight Award ====
- Naomi Watts

==== Distinguished Collaborator Award ====
- Richard Linklater

==== Edith Head Award ====
- Deborah Nadoolman Landis
