= Costume Designers Guild Award for Excellence in Period Television =

Annual CDG TV award

The Costume Designers Guild Award for Excellence in Period Television is one of the annual awards given by the Costume Designers Guild.

The award was previously combined with Excellence in Fantasy Television from 1999 to 2014, before being spun out into its own category in 2015.

== Winners and nominees ==
=== 2010s ===
Year	Series	Costume Designer(s)	Network
2015	The Knick	Ellen Mirojnick	Cinemax
2015	Mad Men	Janie Bryant and Tiffany White Stanton	AMC
2015	Masters of Sex	Isis Mussenden	Showtime
2015	Outlander	Terry Dresbach	Starz
2015	Penny Dreadful	Gabriella Pescucci	Showtime
2016	The Crown	Michele Clapton	Netflix
2016	Penny Dreadful	Gabriella Pescucci	Showtime
2016	Stranger Things	Kimberly Adams-Galligan and Malgosia Turzanska	Netflix
2016	Westworld	Trish Summerville ("Pilot")	HBO
2016	Westworld	Ane Crabtree (Series)	HBO
2017	The Crown	Jane Petrie	Netflix
2017	Feud: Bette and Joan	Lou Eyrich	FX
2017	GLOW	Beth Morgan	Netflix
2017	The Marvelous Mrs. Maisel	Donna Zakowska	Amazon
2017	Stranger Things	Kim Wilcox	Netflix
2018	The Marvelous Mrs. Maisel	Donna Zakowska	Amazon
2018	The Alienist	Michael Kaplan	TNT
2018	GLOW	Beth Morgan	Netflix
2018	The Man in the High Castle	Catherine Adair	Amazon
2018	Outlander	Nina Ayres and Terry Dresbach	Starz

Year	Series	Episode	Costume Designer(s)	Network
2019	The Marvelous Mrs. Maisel	"It's Comedy or Cabbage"	Donna Zakowska	Amazon
2019	Chernobyl	"Please Remain Calm"	Odile Dicks-Mireaux	HBO
2019	The Crown	"Cri de Coeur"	Amy Roberts	Netflix
2019	Fosse/Verdon	"Life Is a Cabaret"	Melissa Toth and Joseph La Corte	FX
2019	GLOW	"Freaky Tuesday"	Beth Morgan	Netflix

=== 2020s ===
Year	Series	Episode(s)	Costume Designer(s)	Network
2020	The Queen's Gambit	"End Game"	Gabriele Binder	Netflix
2020	Bridgerton	"Diamond of the First Water"	Ellen Mirojnick and John W. Glaser III	Netflix
2020	The Crown	"Terra Nullius"	Amy Roberts	Netflix
2020	Lovecraft Country	"I Am."	Dayna Pink	HBO
2020	Mrs. America	"Shirley"	Bina Daigeler	FX
2021	The Great	"Seven Day"	Sharon Long	Hulu
2021	Halston	"Becoming Halston"	Jeriana San Juan	Netflix
2021	The Underground Railroad	"Chapter 8: Indiana Autumn"	Caroline Eselin-Schaefer	Amazon
2021	WandaVision	"Filmed Before a Live Studio Audience"	Mayes C. Rubeo	Disney+
2021	What We Do in the Shadows	"The Wellness Center"	Laura Montgomery	FX
2022	The Crown	"Ipatiev House"	Amy Roberts	Netflix
2022	Bridgerton	"The Choice"	Sophie Canale	Netflix
2022	The Gilded Age	"Let the Tournament Begin"	Kasia Walicka-Maimone	HBO
2022	The Marvelous Mrs. Maisel	"Maisel vs. Lennon: The Cut Contest"	Donna Zakowska	Prime Video
2022	Pam & Tommy	"I Love You, Tommy"	Kameron Lennox	Hulu
2023	The Great	"Choose Your Weapon"	Sharon Long	Hulu
2023	The Crown	"Ritz"	Amy Roberts	Netflix
2023	Daisy Jones & the Six	"Track 8: Looks Like We Made It"	Denise Wingate	Prime Video
2023	George & Tammy	"Two Story House"	Mitchell Travers	Showtime
2023	The Gilded Age	"You Don't Even Like Opera"	Kasia Walicka-Maimone and Patrick Wiley	HBO
2024	Shōgun	"Ladies of the Willow World"	Carlos Rosario	FX on Hulu
2024	Bridgerton	"Romancing Mister Bridgerton"	John Glaser	Netflix
2024	Feud: Capote vs. the Swans	"Hats, Gloves and Effete Homosexuals"	Lou Eyrich and Rudy Mance	FX
2024	Palm Royale	"Maxine Throws a Party"	Alix Friedberg and Leigh Bell	Apple TV+
2024	Ripley	"IV La Dolce Vita"	Maurizio Millenotti and Gianni Casalnuovo	Netflix
2025	Palm Royale	"Maxine Is Ready to Single Mingle"	Alix Friedberg and Leigh Bell	Apple TV+
2025	1923	"A Dream and a Memory"	Janie Bryant and Gaby Acosta	Paramount+
2025	Chief of War	"City of Flowers"	Caroline Eselin-Schaefer	Apple TV+
2025	The Gilded Age	"Marriage Is a Gamble"	Kasia Walicka-Maimone	HBO
2025	House of Guinness	"Episode 4"	Edward K. Gibbon	Netflix

== Designers with multiple wins ==
2 wins

- Sharon Long
- Donna Zakowska

== Programs with multiple wins ==
3 wins

- The Crown

2 wins

- The Great
- The Marvelous Mrs. Maisel

== Designers with multiple nominations ==
4 nominations

- Amy Roberts
- Donna Zakowska

3 nominations

- Beth Morgan
- Kasia Walicka-Maimone

2 nominations

- Leigh Bell
- Katherine Jane Bryant
- Terry Dresbach
- Caroline Eselin-Schaefer
- Lou Eyrich
- Alix Friedberg
- Sharon Long
- Ellen Mirojnick
- Gabriella Pescucci

== Programs with multiple nominations ==
6 nominations

- The Crown

4 nominations

- The Marvelous Mrs. Maisel

3 nominations

- Bridgerton
- The Gilded Age
- GLOW

2 nominations

- Feud
- The Great
- Outlander
- Palm Royale
- Penny Dreadful
- Stranger Things
- Westworld
