= Critics' Choice Movie Award for Best Costume Design =

Award given by the Critics Choice Association

The Critics' Choice Movie Award for Best Costume Design is one of the Critics' Choice Movie Awards given to people working in the film industry by the Critics Choice Association. It was first given out in 2009. Only three times (in 2016, 2019, and 2023) has it not lined up with the winner of the Academy Award for Best Costume Design.

== Winners and nominees ==
=== 2000s ===
Year	Film	Costume designer	Ref.
2009	The Young Victoria	Sandy Powell	
2009	Bright Star	Janet Patterson	
2009	Inglourious Basterds	Anna B. Sheppard	
2009	Nine	Colleen Atwood	
2009	Where the Wild Things Are	Casey Storm	

=== 2010s ===
Year	Film	Costume designer(s)	Ref.
2010	Alice in Wonderland	Colleen Atwood	
2010	Black Swan	Amy Westcott	
2010	The King's Speech	Jenny Beavan	
2010	True Grit	Mary Zophres	
2011	The Artist	Mark Bridges	
2011	The Help	Sharen Davis	
2011	Hugo	Sandy Powell	
2011	Jane Eyre	Michael O'Connor	
2011	My Week with Marilyn	Jill Taylor	
2012	Anna Karenina	Jacqueline Durran	
2012	Cloud Atlas	Kym Barrett and Pierre-Yves Gayraud	
2012	The Hobbit: An Unexpected Journey	Bob Buck, Ann Maskrey, and Richard Taylor	
2012	Les Misérables	Paco Delgado	
2012	Lincoln	Joanna Johnston	
2013	The Great Gatsby	Catherine Martin	
2013	12 Years a Slave	Patricia Norris	
2013	American Hustle	Michael Wilkinson	
2013	The Hobbit: The Desolation of Smaug	Bob Buck, Lesley Burkes-Harding, Ann Maskrey, and Richard Taylor	
2013	Saving Mr. Banks	Daniel Orlandi	
2014	The Grand Budapest Hotel	Milena Canonero	
2014	Inherent Vice	Mark Bridges	
2014	Into the Woods	Colleen Atwood	
2014	Maleficent	Anna B. Sheppard	
2014	Mr. Turner	Jacqueline Durran	
2015	Mad Max: Fury Road	Jenny Beavan	
2015	Brooklyn	Odile Dicks-Mireaux	
2015	Carol	Sandy Powell	
2015	Cinderella	Sandy Powell	
2015	The Danish Girl	Paco Delgado	
2016	Jackie	Madeline Fontaine	
2016	Allied	Joanna Johnston	
2016	Fantastic Beasts and Where to Find Them	Colleen Atwood	
2016	Florence Foster Jenkins	Consolata Boyle	
2016	La La Land	Mary Zophres	
2016	Love & Friendship	Eimer Ní Mhaoldomhnaigh	
2017	Phantom Thread	Mark Bridges	
2017	Beauty and the Beast	Jacqueline Durran	
2017	Blade Runner 2049	Renée April	
2017	The Shape of Water	Luis Sequeira	
2017	Wonder Woman	Lindy Hemming	
2018	Black Panther	Ruth E. Carter	
2018	Bohemian Rhapsody	Julian Day	
2018	The Favourite	Sandy Powell	
2018	Mary Poppins Returns	Sandy Powell	
2018	Mary Queen of Scots	Alexandra Byrne	
2019	Dolemite Is My Name	Ruth E. Carter	
2019	Downton Abbey	Anna Robbins	
2019	The Irishman	Sandy Powell and Christopher Peterson	
2019	Little Women	Jacqueline Durran	
2019	Once Upon a Time in Hollywood	Arianne Phillips	
2019	Rocketman	Julian Day	

=== 2020s ===
Year	Film	Costume designer(s)	Ref.
2020	Ma Rainey's Black Bottom	Ann Roth	
2020	Emma	Alexandra Byrne	
2020	Mank	Trish Summerville	
2020	Mulan	Bina Daigeler	
2020	The Personal History of David Copperfield	Suzie Harman and Robert Worley	
2020	Promising Young Woman	Nancy Steiner	
2021	Cruella	Jenny Beavan	
2021	Dune	Jacqueline West and Robert Morgan	
2021	House of Gucci	Janty Yates	
2021	Nightmare Alley	Luis Sequeira	
2021	West Side Story	Paul Tazewell	
2022	Black Panther: Wakanda Forever	Ruth E. Carter	
2022	Babylon	Mary Zophres	
2022	Elvis	Catherine Martin	
2022	Everything Everywhere All at Once	Shirley Kurata	
2022	Glass Onion: A Knives Out Mystery	Jenny Eagan	
2022	The Woman King	Gersha Phillips	
2023	Barbie	Jacqueline Durran	
2023	The Color Purple	Francine Jamison-Tanchuck	
2023	Killers of the Flower Moon	Jacqueline West	
2023	Napoleon	Janty Yates and Dave Crossman	
2023	Poor Things	Holly Waddington	
2023	Wonka	Lindy Hemming	
2024	Wicked	Paul Tazewell	
2024	Conclave	Lisy Christl	
2024	Dune: Part Two	Jacqueline West	
2024	Gladiator II	Janty Yates and Dave Crossman	
2024	Maria	Massimo Cantini Parrini	
2024	Nosferatu	Linda Muir	
2025	Frankenstein	Kate Hawley	
2025	Hamnet	Malgosia Turzanska	
2025	Hedda	Lindsay Pugh	
2025	Kiss of the Spider Woman	Colleen Atwood and Christine Cantella	
2025	Sinners	Ruth E. Carter	
2025	Wicked: For Good	Paul Tazewell	
