= Costume Designers Guild Award for Excellence in Sci-Fi/Fantasy Television =

Annual CDG TV award

The Costume Designers Guild Award for Excellence in Sci-Fi/Fantasy Television is one of the annual awards given by the Costume Designers Guild.

The award was previously combined with Excellence in Period Television from 1999 to 2014, before being spun out into its own category in 2015. In 2017, the category was renamed from Excellence in Fantasy Television to its current name.

== Winners and nominees ==
=== 2010s ===
Excellence in Fantasy Television

Year	Series	Costume Designer(s)	Network
2015	Game of Thrones	Michele Clapton	HBO
2015	Once Upon a Time	Eduardo Castro	ABC
2015	Sleepy Hollow	Kristin M. Burke and Mairi Chisholm (S2)	Fox
2015	Sleepy Hollow	Mairi Chisholm (S3)	Fox
2015	The Wiz Live!	Paul Tazewell	NBC
2016	Game of Thrones	Michele Clapton and April Ferry	HBO
2016	The Man in the High Castle	J.R. Hawbaker	Amazon
2016	Once Upon a Time	Eduardo Castro	ABC
2016	Sleepy Hollow	Mairi Chisholm	Fox
2016	The Walking Dead	Eulyn Colette Hufkie	AMC

Excellence in Sci-Fi/Fantasy Television

Year	Series	Costume Designer(s)	Network
2017	Game of Thrones	Michele Clapton	HBO
2017	Black Mirror: USS Callister	Maja Meschede	Netflix
2017	Once Upon a Time	Eduardo Castro and Dan Lester	ABC
2017	Sleepy Hollow	Mairi Chisholm	Fox
2017	Star Trek: Discovery	Gersha Phillips	CBS All Access
2018	Westworld	Sharen Davis	HBO
2018	American Horror Story: Apocalypse	Paula Bradley and Lou Eyrich	FX
2018	The Handmaid's Tale	Ane Crabtree	Hulu
2018	A Series of Unfortunate Events	Cynthia Ann Summers	Netflix
2018	Star Trek: Discovery	Gersha Phillips	CBS All Access

Year	Series	Episode(s)	Costume Designer(s)	Network
2019	Game of Thrones	"The Iron Throne"	Michele Clapton	HBO
2019	Carnival Row	"Aisling"	Joanna Eatwell	Amazon
2019	The Handmaid's Tale	"Household"	Natalie Bronfman	Hulu
2019	A Series of Unfortunate Events	"Penultimate Peril, Part 2"	Cynthia Summers	Netflix
2019	Watchmen	"It's Summer and We're Running Out of Ice"	Sharen Davis	HBO

=== 2020s ===
Year	Series	Episode(s)	Costume Designer(s)	Network
2020	Westworld	"Parce Domine"	Shay Cunliffe	HBO
2020	The Mandalorian	"Chapter 13: The Jedi"	Shawna Trpcic	Disney+
2020	Snowpiercer	"Access Is Power"	Cynthia Summers	TNT
2020	Star Trek: Picard	"Absolute Candor"	Christine Bieselin Clark	CBS All Access
2020	What We Do in the Shadows	"Nouveau Théâtre des Vampires"	Amanda Neale	FX
2021	The Book of Boba Fett	"Chapter 1: Stranger in a Strange Land"	Shawna Trpcic	Disney+
2021	The Handmaid's Tale	"Nightshade"	Debra Hanson	Hulu
2021	Loki	"Journey Into Mystery"	Christine Wada	Disney+
2021	What We Do in the Shadows	"Gail"	Laura Montgomery	FX
2021	The Witcher	"Family"	Lucinda Wright	Netflix
2022	House of the Dragon	"The Heirs of the Dragon"	Jany Temime	HBO
2022	The Lord of the Rings: The Rings of Power	"A Shadow of the Past"	Kate Hawley	Prime Video
2022	Westworld	"Generation Loss"	Debra Beebe	HBO
2022	What We Do in the Shadows	"The Wedding"	Laura Montgomery	FX
2022	The Witcher: Blood Origin	"Of Mages, Malice, and Monstrous Mayhem"	Lucinda Wright	Netflix
2023	Ahsoka	"Part Eight: The Jedi, the Witch, and the Warlord"	Shawna Trpcic	Disney+
2023	Loki	"1893"	Christine Wada	Disney+
2023	The Mandalorian	"Chapter 22: Guns for Hire"	Shawna Trpcic	Disney+
2023	What We Do in the Shadows	"Pride Parade"	Laura Montgomery	FX
2023	The Witcher	"The Art of the Illusion"	Lucinda Wright	Netflix
2024	Dune: Prophecy	"The Hidden Hand"	Bojana Nikitovic	HBO
2024	Agatha All Along	"If I Can't Reach You / Let My Song Teach You"	Daniel Selon	Disney+
2024	Fallout	"The Target"	Amy Westcott	Prime Video
2024	House of the Dragon	"The Red Dragon and the Gold"	Caroline McCall	HBO
2024	The Lord of the Rings: The Rings of Power	"Doomed to Die"	Luca Mosca, Katherine Burchill and Libby Dempster	Prime Video
2025	Andor	"Harvest"	Michael Wilkinson	Disney+
2025	Black Mirror	"USS Callister: Into Infinity"	Matthew Price	Netflix
2025	Murderbot	"FreeCommerce"	Carrie Grace and Laura Jean Shannon	Apple TV+
2025	The Wheel of Time	"He Who Comes with the Dawn"	Sharon Gilham	Prime Video
2025	The Witcher	"Baptism of Fire"	Lucinda Wright	Netflix

== Designers with multiple wins ==
4 wins

- Michele Clapton

2 wins

- Shawna Trpcic

== Programs with multiple wins ==
4 wins

- Game of Thrones

2 wins

- Westworld

== Designers with multiple nominations ==
4 nominations

- Mairi Chisholm
- Michele Clapton
- Shawna Trpcic
- Lucinda Wright

3 nominations

- Eduardo Castro
- Laura Montgomery
- Cynthia Summers

2 nominations

- Sharen Davis
- Gersha Phillips
- Christine Wada

== Programs with multiple nominations ==
4 nominations

- Game of Thrones
- Sleepy Hollow
- What We Do in the Shadows

3 nominations

- The Handmaid's Tale
- Once Upon a Time
- Westworld
- The Witcher

2 nominations

- Black Mirror
- House of the Dragon
- Loki
- The Lord of the Rings: The Rings of Power
- The Mandalorian
- A Series of Unfortunate Events
- Star Trek: Discovery
