= 25th Costume Designers Guild Awards =

Award ceremony for film and television costuming in 2022

- Date: February 27, 2023
- Location: The Fairmont Century Plaza, Los Angeles, California
- Country: United States
- Presented by: Costume Designers Guild
- Hosted by: Tituss Burgess

Highlights
- Excellence in Contemporary Film: Glass Onion: A Knives Out Mystery – Jenny Eagan
- Excellence in Period Film: Elvis – Catherine Martin
- Excellence in Sci-Fi/Fantasy Film: Everything Everywhere All at Once – Shirley Kurata

The 25th Costume Designers Guild Awards, honoring excellence in film, television, and short form costume design for 2022, were held on February 27, 2023, at the Fairmont Century Plaza in Los Angeles. The nominees were announced on January 12, 2023. The ceremony was hosted by Tituss Burgess.

Special honors were awarded to Angela Bassett (Spotlight Award), Bette Midler (Distinguished Collaborator Award), and costume designers Deborah L. Scott (Career Achievement Award) and Rachael M. Stanley (Distinguished Service Award).

== Winners and nominees ==
Winners are listed first and in bold.

=== Film ===
Excellence in Contemporary Film	Excellence in Period Film
**Glass Onion: A Knives Out Mystery – Jenny Eagan**; Nope – Alex Bovaird; Tár – Bina Daigeler; Top Gun: Maverick – Marlene Stewart; Women Talking – Quita Alfred	**Elvis – Catherine Martin**; Babylon – Mary Zophres; Don't Worry Darling – Arianne Phillips; Mrs. Harris Goes to Paris – Jenny Beavan; The Woman King – Gersha Phillips
Excellence in Sci-Fi/Fantasy Film
**Everything Everywhere All at Once – Shirley Kurata**; Avatar: The Way of Water – Deborah L. Scott; Black Panther: Wakanda Forever – Ruth E. Carter; Hocus Pocus 2 – Salvador Perez; Thor: Love and Thunder – Mayes C. Rubeo

=== Television ===
Excellence in Contemporary Television	Excellence in Period Television
**Wednesday: "Wednesday's Child Is Full of Woe" – Colleen Atwood and Mark Sutherland (Netflix)**; Emily in Paris: "What's It All About..." – Marylin Fitoussi (Netflix); Euphoria: "Trying to Get to Heaven Before They Close the Door" – Heidi Bivens (HBO); Hacks: "The Captain's Wife" – Kathleen Felix-Hager (HBO Max); The White Lotus: "In the Sandbox" – Alex Bovaird (HBO)	**The Crown: "Ipatiev House" – Amy Roberts (Netflix)**; Bridgerton: "The Choice" – Sophie Canale (Netflix); The Gilded Age: "Let the Tournament Begin" – Kasia Walicka-Maimone (HBO); The Marvelous Mrs. Maisel: "Maisel vs. Lennon: The Cut Contest" – Donna Zakowska (Prime Video); Pam & Tommy: "I Love You, Tommy" – Kameron Lennox (Hulu)
Excellence in Sci-Fi/Fantasy Television	Excellence in Variety, Reality-Competition, Live Television
**House of the Dragon: "The Heirs of the Dragon" – Jany Temime (HBO)**; The Lord of the Rings: The Rings of Power: "A Shadow of the Past" – Kate Hawley (Prime Video); Westworld: "Generation Loss" – Debra Beebe (HBO); What We Do in the Shadows: "The Wedding" – Laura Montgomery (FX); The Witcher: Blood Origin: "Of Mages, Malice, and Monstrous Mayhem" – Lucinda Wright (Netflix)	**Lizzo's Watch Out for the Big Grrrls: "Girl Run That Sh*t Back" – Carrie Cramer and Jason Rembert (Prime Video)**; Beauty and the Beast: A 30th Celebration – Marina Toybina (Disney+); Dancing with the Stars: "Halloween Night" – Daniela Gschwendtner and Steven Norman Lee (Disney+); RuPaul's Secret Celebrity Drag Race: "RuPaul-A-Palooza!" – Tony Iniguez (VH1); Saturday Night Live: "Miles Teller/Kendrick Lamar" – Tom Broecker, Ashley Dudek, and Cristina Natividad (NBC)

=== Short Form ===
Excellence in Short Form Design
- **Yeah Yeah Yeahs: "Spitting Off the Edge of the World" (Music Video) – Natasha Newman-Thomas**
  - Disney+ Has All the GOATs (Commercial) – Melissa DesRosiers
  - McDonald's: Black Panther: Wakanda Forever (Commercial) – Sarah Kinsumba
  - Nike: Father Time (Commercial) – Shawna Trpcic (for Jason Momoa)
  - Not Today Flu feat. Jason Alexander (Commercial) – Dawn Ritz

=== Special awards ===
==== Career Achievement Award ====
- Deborah Lynn Scott

==== Spotlight Award ====
- Angela Bassett

==== Distinguished Collaborator Award ====
- Bette Midler

==== Distinguished Service Award ====
- Rachael M. Stanley
