= Mayes C. Rubeo =

Mexican costume designer (born 1962)

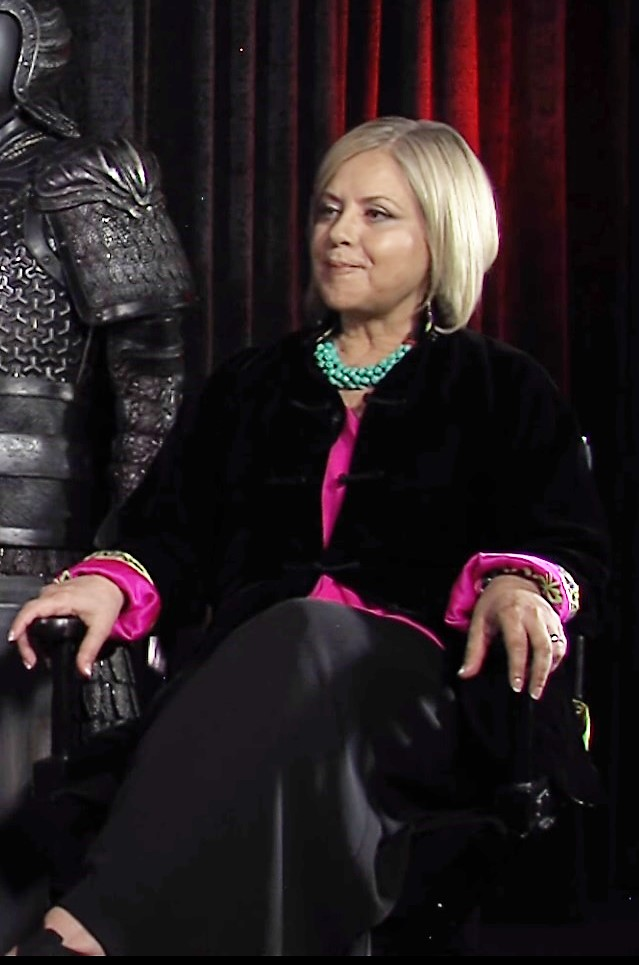
- Mayes Rubeo interviewed by Dulce Osuna in 2017
- Born: Mayes Castillero; 1962 (age 63–64); Mexico City, Mexico
- Other names: Mayes Rubeo; Mayes Castillero de Rubeo
- Education: LATTC; UCLA Extension
- Occupation: Costume designer
- Years active: 1986–present
- Spouse: Bruno Rubeo (died 2011)
- Children: 1

Mayes Castillero Rubeo (born 1962) is a Mexican costume designer. She is known for her work on the films Apocalypto (2006), Avatar (2009), John Carter (2012), World War Z (2013), Warcraft (2016), Thor: Ragnarok (2017) and Jojo Rabbit (2019), the lattermost of which earned her Academy Award and BAFTA Award nominations.

== Life and career ==
Rubeo was born Mayes Castillero in Mexico City, in 1962. She studied in Guadalajara Higschool José Guadalupe Zuno Hernández. She moved from Mexico City to Los Angeles in the 1980s, and attended Los Angeles Trade Tech. After graduating, she moved to Italy to work with Italian Costume Designer Enrico Sabbatini. To this day, Rubeo maintains a workshop in Italy.

She got her start in Hollywood working as a costume designer In 2006, she was engaged as a costume designer for Mel Gibson's Apocalypto. Three years later she worked with James Cameron on Avatar, for which she was nominated for the Costume Designers Guild Award in the Excellence in Fantasy Film category.

Rubeo received Academy Award and BAFTA Award nominations for best costume design for Jojo Rabbit. Because of this she was the first Latin American to be nominated for the Academy Award for Best Costume Design.

== Personal life ==
Mayes Rubeo was married to the Italian production designer Bruno Rubeo until he died in 2011. Their son is an art director.

== Filmography ==
=== Film ===
| Year | Title | Director | Notes |
|---|---|---|---|
| 1996 | The Arrival | David Twohy | |
| 1997 | Men with Guns | John Sayles | |
| 1999 | Inferno | John G. Avildsen | |
| 2002 | Sunshine State | John Sayles | |
| 2003 | Casa de los babys | John Sayles | |
| 2006 | Apocalypto | Mel Gibson | |
| 2009 | Dragonball Evolution | James Wong | |
| 2009 | Avatar | James Cameron | with Deborah Lynn Scott |
| 2012 | John Carter | Andrew Stanton | |
| 2013 | World War Z | Marc Forster | |
| 2016 | Warcraft | Duncan Jones | |
| 2016 | The Great Wall | Zhang Yimou | |
| 2017 | Thor: Ragnarok | Taika Waititi | |
| 2019 | Jojo Rabbit | Taika Waititi | |
| 2022 | Thor: Love and Thunder | Taika Waititi | |
| 2023 | Blue Beetle | Ángel Manuel Soto | |
| 2024 | Kingdom of the Planet of the Apes | Wes Ball | |
| 2024 | Deadpool & Wolverine | Shawn Levy | with Graham Churchyard |
| 2026 | Klara and the Sun | Taika Waititi | |

=== Television ===
| Year | Title | Notes |
|---|---|---|
| 2001 | Warden of Red Rock | Television film |
| 2002 | Fidel | Television film |
| 2004 | The Librarian: Quest for the Spear | Television film |
| 2021 | WandaVision | 9 episodes |
| 2022 | Werewolf by Night | Television special |

== Awards and nominations ==
Major associations

Academy Awards

| Year | Category | Nominated work | Result | Ref. |
|---|---|---|---|---|
| 2020 | Best Costume Design | Jojo Rabbit | Nominated | |

BAFTA Awards

| Year | Category | Nominated work | Result | Ref. |
British Academy Film Awards
| 2020 | Best Costume Design | Jojo Rabbit | Nominated | |

Emmy Awards

| Year | Category | Nominated work | Result | Ref. |
Primetime Emmy Awards
| 2021 | Outstanding Fantasy/Sci-Fi Costumes | WandaVision (Episode: "Filmed Before a Live Studio Audience") | Won | |

Miscellaneous awards

List of Mayes C. Rubeo other awards and nominations
| Award | Year (Note: Indicates the year of ceremony. Each year is linked to the article about the awards held that year, wherever possible.) | Category | Title | Result | Ref. |
|---|---|---|---|---|---|
| Coronado Island Film Festival | 2021 | Artistry in Filmmaking Award | —N/a | Honored | |
| Costume Designers Guild Awards | 2003 | Excellence in Period/Fantasy Television | Fidel | Nominated | |
| Costume Designers Guild Awards | 2010 | Excellence in Fantasy Film | Avatar | Nominated | |
| Costume Designers Guild Awards | 2018 | Excellence in Sci-Fi/Fantasy Film | Thor: Ragnarok | Nominated | |
| Costume Designers Guild Awards | 2020 | Excellence in Period Film | Jojo Rabbit | Won | |
| Costume Designers Guild Awards | 2022 | Excellence in Period Television | WandaVision (Episode: "Filmed Before a Live Studio Audience") | Nominated | |
| Costume Designers Guild Awards | 2023 | Excellence in Sci-Fi/Fantasy Film | Thor: Love and Thunder | Nominated | |
| Empire Awards | 2018 | Best Costume Design | Thor: Ragnarok | Nominated | |
| Saturn Awards | 2021 | Best Costume Design | Jojo Rabbit | Nominated | |
| Saturn Awards | 2022 | Best Costume Design | Thor: Love and Thunder | Nominated | |
| Saturn Awards | 2025 | Best Costume Design | Deadpool & Wolverine | Nominated | |
