= Bruno Rubeo =

Production designer

- Born: 26 October 1946; Rome, Italy
- Died: 3 November 2011 (aged 65); Foligno, Italy
- Occupation: Production designer
- Years active: 1982–2010
- Spouse: Mayes C. Rubeo (?-November 2011) (his death)
- Children: 1 (Marco Rubeo)

Bruno Rubeo (26 October 1946 – 3 November 2011) was a production designer, known for his multiple collaborations with film directors Oliver Stone and Taylor Hackford.

== Biography ==
He was nominated for an Academy Award in the category Best Art Direction for the film Driving Miss Daisy.

While scouting artists and locations for the film Blood In, Blood Out (1993), directed by Taylor Hackford, he came across the paintings of artist Adan Hernandez, and his role in that film brought him to national attention.

Rubeo died of pneumonia on 3 November 2011 at the city hospital in Foligno, Italy. He is survived by his wife Mayes C. Rubeo, a highly acclaimed costume designer, and a son, who is also an art director.

== Selected filmography ==
Year	Title
1986	Platoon
1986	Salvador
1988	Talk Radio
1989	Born on the Fourth of July
1989	Driving Miss Daisy
1990	Kindergarten Cop
1993	Sommersby
1994	The Client
1995	Dolores Claiborne
1997	The Devil's Advocate
1999	The Thomas Crown Affair
