= Mary Zophres =

American costume designer

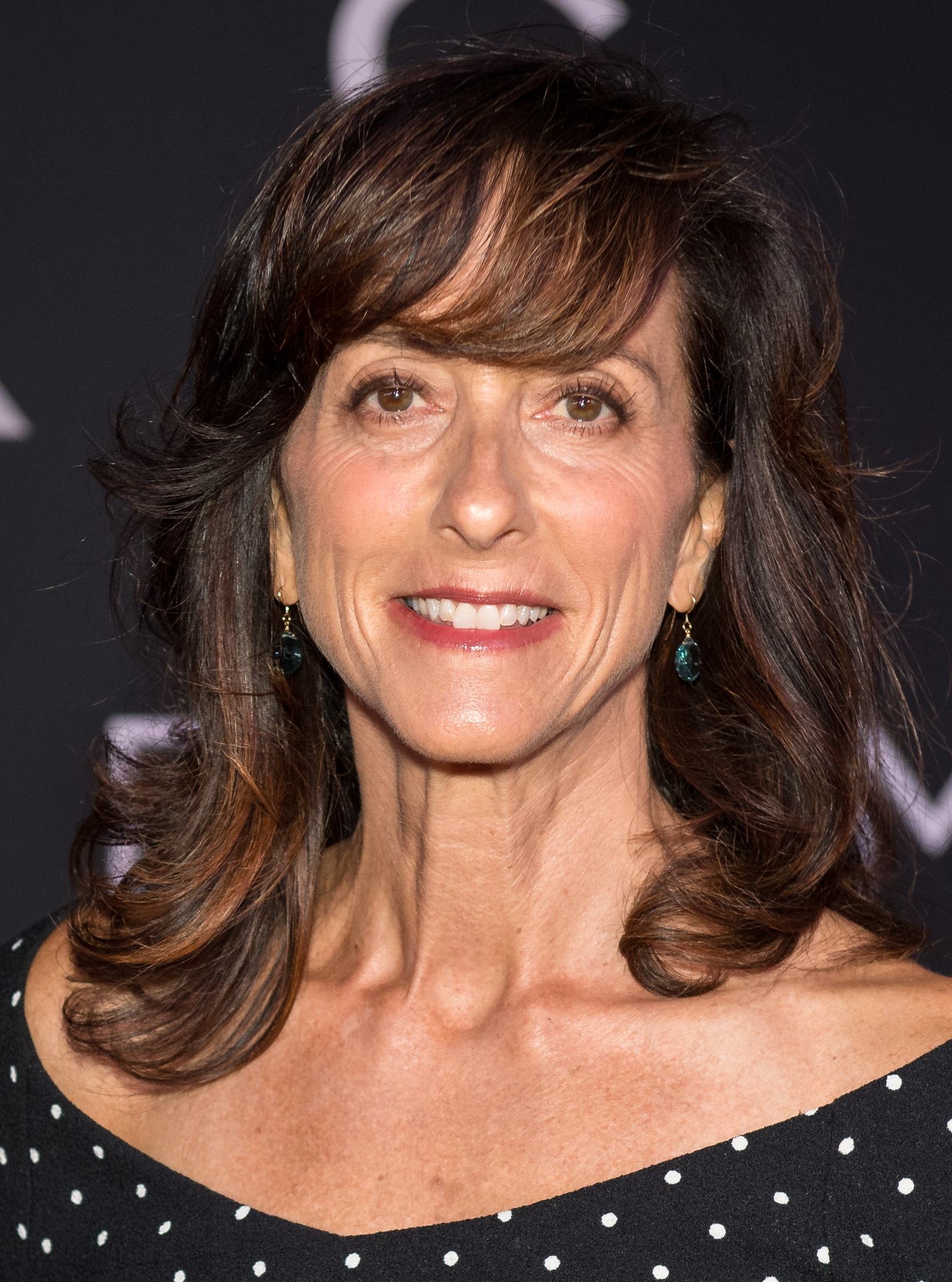
- Zophres in 2018
- Born: Ft. Lauderdale, Florida, U.S.
- Occupation: Costume designer
- Years active: 1994–present
- Spouse: Murray Valeriano (m. 2006)

Mary Zophres is an American costume designer. Her accolades include a Costume Designers Guild Award, in addition to nominations for four Academy Awards and five BAFTA Awards.

Zophres is best known for her collaborations with directors such as the Coen brothers, Steven Spielberg, and Damien Chazelle.

== Early life and education ==
Zophres was born in Ft. Lauderdale, Florida. Her father was born in Ioannina, Greece. She graduated from the Vassar College with degrees in art history and studio art.

After graduation, Zophres moved to New York City and began her career in fashion, which included stints for Norma Kamali and Esprit, among others. She first went into film production, being the extras wardrobe supervisor on Oliver Stone's 1989 film Born on the Fourth of July. She worked under costume designer Judy L. Ruskin, who first tasked her to sort through and organize massive piles of thrifted buy-by-the-pound clothing into categories: '50s, '60s, and '70s, and then asked her to return another day. Zophres subsequently worked as an associate costume designer for Ruskin on three more films, including the 1991 film City Slickers. Zophres moved to Los Angeles and began a professional relationship with designer Richard Hornung. She worked for him on several films, including the Coen brothers's 1994 film The Hudsucker Proxy. During the preproduction of Coen's 1996 film, Fargo Hornung felt ill and couldn't finish the project. He recommended Zophres instead. She continued a creative partnership with the Coen brothers on all of their subsequent films.

== Filmography ==
Year	Title	Director
1994	PCU	Hart Bochner
1994	Dumb and Dumber	Peter Farrelly
1995	Bushwhacked	Greg Beeman
1996	Fargo	Joel Coen
1996	Kingpin	Peter Farrelly; Bobby Farrelly
1996	The Last of the High Kings	David Keating
1997	Digging to China	Timothy Hutton
1997	Playing God	Andy Wilson
1998	The Big Lebowski	Joel Coen
1998	God Said Ha!	Julia Sweeney
1998	Paulie	John Roberts
1998	There's Something About Mary	Peter Farrelly; Bobby Farrelly
1998	Where's Marlowe?	Daniel Pyne
1999	Thick as Thieves	Scott Sanders
1999	Any Given Sunday	Oliver Stone
2000	O Brother, Where Art Thou?	Joel Coen
2001	The Man Who Wasn't There	Joel Coen
2001	Ghost World	Terry Zwigoff
2001	Moonlight Mile	Brad Silberling
2002	Catch Me If You Can	Steven Spielberg
2002	View from the Top	Bruno Barreto
2003	Intolerable Cruelty	Joel Coen
2004	The Ladykillers	Joel Coen; Ethan Coen
2004	The Terminal	Steven Spielberg
2005	Bewitched	Nora Ephron
2006	Smokin' Aces	Joe Carnahan
2007	No Country for Old Men	Joel Coen; Ethan Coen
2007	Lions for Lambs	Robert Redford
2008	Indiana Jones and the Kingdom of the Crystal Skull	Steven Spielberg
2008	Burn After Reading	Joel Coen; Ethan Coen
2009	A Serious Man	Joel Coen; Ethan Coen
2010	Iron Man 2	Jon Favreau
2010	True Grit	Joel Coen; Ethan Coen
2011	Cowboys & Aliens	Jon Favreau
2012	People Like Us	Alex Kurtzman
2013	Gangster Squad	Ruben Fleischer
2013	Inside Llewyn Davis	Joel Coen; Ethan Coen
2014	Interstellar	Christopher Nolan
2016	Hail, Caesar!	Joel Coen; Ethan Coen
2016	La La Land	Damien Chazelle
2017	Battle of the Sexes	Jonathan Dayton; Valerie Faris
2018	First Man	Damien Chazelle
2018	The Ballad of Buster Scruggs	Joel Coen; Ethan Coen
2020	Antebellum	Gerard Bush; Christopher Renz
2021	The Tragedy of Macbeth	Joel Coen
2022	Babylon	Damien Chazelle
2024	Fly Me to the Moon	Greg Berlanti
2026	The Mandalorian and Grogu	Jon Favreau
2026	Behemoth! †	Tony Gilroy

Key
†	Denotes films that have not yet been released

== Awards and nominations ==
Major associations

Academy Awards

Year	Category	Nominated work	Result	Ref.
2011	Best Costume Design	True Grit	Nominated	
2017	Best Costume Design	La La Land	Nominated	
2019	Best Costume Design	The Ballad of Buster Scruggs	Nominated	
2023	Best Costume Design	Babylon	Nominated	

BAFTA Awards

Year	Category	Nominated work	Result	Ref.
British Academy Film Awards
2003	Best Costume Design	Catch Me If You Can	Nominated	
2011	Best Costume Design	True Grit	Nominated	
2017	Best Costume Design	La La Land	Nominated	
2019	Best Costume Design	The Ballad of Buster Scruggs	Nominated	
2023	Best Costume Design	Babylon	Nominated	

Miscellaneous awards

List of Mary Zophres other awards and nominations
Award	Year (Note: Indicates the year of ceremony. Each year is linked to the article about the awards held that year, wherever possible.)	Category	Title	Result	Ref.
Apolo Awards	2018	Best Costume Design	Battle of the Sexes	Won	
Astra Film and Creative Arts Awards	2023	Best Costume Design	Babylon	Nominated	
Black Reel Awards	2022	Outstanding Costume Design	The Tragedy of Macbeth	Nominated	
Chicago Film Critics Association Awards	2022	Best Costume Design	Babylon	Nominated	
Costume Designers Guild Awards	2006	Excellence in Commercial Design	Orbit Gum	Nominated	
Costume Designers Guild Awards	2011	Excellence in Period Film	True Grit	Nominated	
Costume Designers Guild Awards	2015	Excellence in Contemporary Film	Interstellar	Nominated	
Costume Designers Guild Awards	2017	Excellence in Contemporary Film	La La Land	Won	
Costume Designers Guild Awards	2017	Excellence in Period Film	Hail, Caesar!	Nominated	
Costume Designers Guild Awards	2023	Excellence in Period Film	Babylon	Nominated	
Critics' Choice Awards	2011	Best Costume Design	True Grit	Nominated	
Critics' Choice Awards	2016	Best Costume Design	La La Land	Nominated	
Critics' Choice Awards	2023	Best Costume Design	Babylon	Nominated	
Hamilton Behind the Camera Awards	2016	Costume Design	Hail, Caesar!	Won	
Hamilton Behind the Camera Awards	2018	Costume Design	First Man	Won	
Las Vegas Film Critics Society Awards	2000	Best Costume Design	O Brother, Where Art Thou?	Nominated	
Las Vegas Film Critics Society Awards	2010	Best Costume Design	True Grit	Nominated	
Las Vegas Film Critics Society Awards	2016	Best Costume Design	La La Land	Nominated	
Las Vegas Film Critics Society Awards	2022	Best Costume Design	Babylon	Nominated	
Online Film Critics Society Awards	2023	Best Costume Design	Babylon	Nominated	
Phoenix Film Critics Society Awards	2010	Best Costume Design	True Grit	Nominated	
Phoenix Film Critics Society Awards	2016	Best Costume Design	La La Land	Nominated	
San Diego Film Critics Society Awards	2016	Best Costume Design	La La Land	Won	
San Diego Film Critics Society Awards	2018	Best Costume Design	The Ballad of Buster Scruggs	Nominated	
San Diego Film Critics Society Awards	2023	Best Costume Design	Babylon	Nominated	
Santa Barbara International Film Festival	2017	Variety Artisans Award	La La Land	Won	
Satellite Awards	2017	Best Costume Design	La La Land	Nominated	
Satellite Awards	2023	Best Costume Design	Babylon	Won	
Saturn Awards	2009	Best Costume Design	Indiana Jones and the Kingdom of the Crystal Skull	Won	
Seattle Film Critics Society Awards (Note: prior to the SFCS formal establishment in 2016, a group of Seattle-area critics compiled the Seattle Film Critics Awards in 2014 and 2015.)	2014	Best Costume Design	Inside Llewyn Davis	Nominated	
Seattle Film Critics Society Awards	2017	Best Costume Design	La La Land	Nominated	
Seattle Film Critics Society Awards	2023	Best Costume Design	Babylon	Nominated	
