= Gabriele Binder =

Costume designer

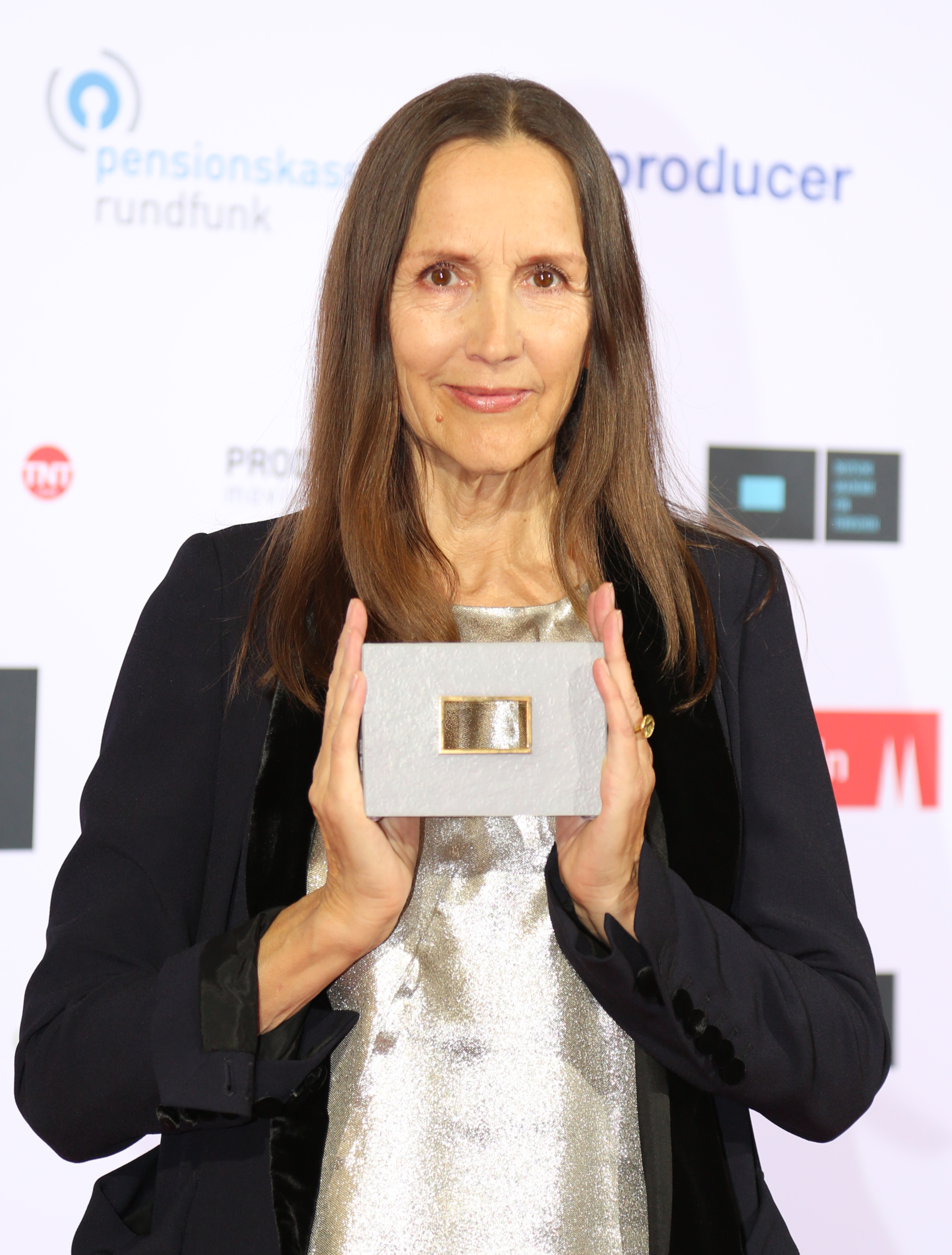
Binder at the award ceremony of the Deutsche Akademie für Fernsehen award ceremony in 2017.

Gabriele Binder is a costume designer based in Berlin. She is known for her work as the costume designer for The Queen's Gambit, for which she won the 2020 Costume Designers Guild Award for Excellence in Period Television.
