= Kate Hawley =

New Zealand costume designer

- Education: Wellington Polytech & Motley Theatre Design
- Known for: Set and costume design

Kate Hawley is a New Zealand costume designer and set designer. Her film credits include Pacific Rim (2013), Crimson Peak (2015), Suicide Squad (2016), and Frankenstein (2025), where she won an Academy Award and BAFTA Award for her work on the latter.

On stage, Hawley created the sets and costumes for various productions at the Royal New Zealand Ballet, the New Zealand Festival, and the New Zealand Opera.

== Biography ==
Hawley grew up in Wellington, New Zealand. She attended Samuel Marsden Collegiate School from 1982-1988, where she created costumes, props and scenery for local and school productions. She enrolled at the Wellington School of Design at Wellington Polytechnic, graduating in 1992 with a Diploma in Visual Communication Design. In 1996, she received a scholarship to study at the Motley Theatre Design Course in London.

Hawley began her career in stage productions, and later moved into film industry. She has taught at Toi Whakaari The New Zealand Drama School.

Hawley's theatre and opera credits as costume or set designer include productions of The Blonde, the Brunette and the Vengeful Redhead for Auckland Theatre Company in 2006; Lucia di Lammermoor for New Zealand Opera in 2007; The Trial of the Cannibal Dog for the New Zealand International Arts Festival in 2008, and Hansel and Gretel for Royal New Zealand Ballet in 2019. In reviewing Lucia di Lammermoor, Pepe Becker wrote:

The all-female leaders of the creative team (director Lindy Hume, assistant director Sara Brodie and production designer Kate Hawley) are to be congratulated for their outstanding and ingenious direction. Venturing away from the traditional sort of production one expects for a Donizetti work proves to be a good move.

In film, Hawley has worked as a crew member for Peter Jackson on The Lovely Bones and The Hobbit: An Unexpected Journey and with Guillermo Del Toro as the costume designer on Pacific Rim (2013), Crimson Peak (2015) and Frankenstein (2025). Her other film credits include creating the costumes for Edge of Tomorrow (2014), Suicide Squad (2016), and Mortal Engines (2018).

== Filmography ==
=== Film ===
Year	Title	Director	Notes
2005	On a Clear Day	Gaby Dellal	
2009	The Lovely Bones	Peter Jackson	Additional costume designer
2012	The Hobbit: An Unexpected Journey	Peter Jackson	Additional costume designer
2013	Pacific Rim	Guillermo del Toro	
2013	The Hobbit: The Desolation of Smaug	Peter Jackson	Additional costume designer
2014	Edge of Tomorrow	Doug Liman	
2014	The Hobbit: The Battle of the Five Armies	Peter Jackson	Additional costume designer
2015	Crimson Peak	Guillermo del Toro	
2016	Suicide Squad	David Ayer	
2018	Mortal Engines	Christian Rivers	
2020	The Call of the Wild	Chris Sanders	
2021	Chaos Walking	Doug Liman	
2025	Frankenstein	Guillermo del Toro	

=== Television ===
Year	Title	Notes
2022	The Lord of the Rings: The Rings of Power	8 episodes

== Awards and nominations ==
Major associations

Academy Awards

Year	Category	Nominated work	Result	Ref.
2026	Best Costume Design	Frankenstein	Won	

BAFTA Awards

Year	Category	Nominated work	Result	Ref.
British Academy Film Awards
2026	Best Costume Design	Frankenstein	Won	

Emmy Awards

Year	Category	Nominated work	Result	Ref.
Primetime Emmy Awards
2023	Outstanding Fantasy/Sci-Fi Costumes	The Lord of the Rings: The Rings of Power (Episode: "A Shadow of the Past")	Nominated	

Miscellaneous awards

List of Kate Hawley other awards and nominations
Award	Year (Note: Indicates the year of ceremony. Each year is linked to the article about the awards held that year, wherever possible.)	Category	Title	Result	Ref.
Astra Film and Creative Arts Awards	2025	Best Costume Design	Frankenstein	Won	
Astra TV and Creative Arts Awards	2023	Best Fantasy or Science Fiction Costumes	The Lord of the Rings: The Rings of Power	Nominated	
Capri Hollywood International Film Festival	2026	Best Costume Design	Frankenstein	Won	
Chapman Tripp Theatre Awards (Note: succeeded by the Wellington Theatre Awards in 2015.)	1993	Costume Designer of the Year	—N/a	Won	
Chicago Film Critics Association Awards	2025	Best Costume Design	Frankenstein	Won	
Costume Designers Guild Awards	2016	Excellence in Period Film	Crimson Peak	Nominated	
Costume Designers Guild Awards	2023	Excellence in Sci-Fi/Fantasy Television	The Lord of the Rings: The Rings of Power (Episode: "A Shadow of the Past")	Nominated	
Costume Designers Guild Awards	2026	Excellence in Period Film	Frankenstein	Won	
Critics' Choice Awards	2026	Best Costume Design	Frankenstein	Won	
Empire Awards	2016	Best Costume Design	Crimson Peak	Nominated	
Fangoria Chainsaw Awards	2026	Best Costume Design	Frankenstein	Won	
The Fashion Awards	2025	Costume Designer of the Year	Frankenstein	Won	
Las Vegas Film Critics Society Awards	2025	Best Costume Design	Frankenstein	Won	
Middleburg Film Festival	2025	Special Achievement in Costume Design Award	Frankenstein	Won	
Online Film Critics Society Awards	2026	Best Costume Design	Frankenstein	Nominated	
San Diego Film Critics Society Awards	2025	Best Costume Design	Frankenstein	Runner-up (Note: Tied with Ruth E. Carter for Sinners)	
Santa Barbara International Film Festival	2026	Variety Artisans Award	Frankenstein	Won	
Satellite Awards	2026	Best Costume Design	Frankenstein	Won	
Saturn Awards	2016	Best Costume Design	Crimson Peak	Nominated	
Saturn Awards	2026	Best Costume Design	Frankenstein	Won	
Seattle Film Critics Society Awards	2025	Best Costume Design	Frankenstein	Won	
St. Louis Film Critics Association Awards	2025	Best Costume Design	Frankenstein	Won	
