= Michele Clapton =

British costume designer

- Occupation: Costume designer
- Years active: 1989–present

A dress and lace jacket designed by Michele Clapton, and worn by Claire Foy when playing Queen Elizabeth II in season 1, episode 6 of The Crown. Photo taken at Winterthur Museum, Garden and Library in 2019.

Michele Clapton is a British costume designer.

Among other awards, she won an Emmy Award for the costumes in Game of Thrones in 2012, 2014, and 2016. In 2016, April Ferry took over Clapton's duties as the new costume designer for a majority of the sixth season of the show. Clapton later returned to the show as costume designer for the seventh season.

== Selected filmography ==
=== Film ===
Year	Title	Director	Notes
1989	Visions of Ecstasy	Nigel Wingrove	Short film
1992	Dust Devil	Richard Stanley	
1999	Simon Magus	Ben Hopkins	
1999	Janice Beard	Clare Kilner	
1999	Women Talking Dirty	Coky Giedroyc	
2000	The Nine Lives of Tomas Katz	Ben Hopkins	
2001	Girl from Rio	Christopher Monger	
2002	Miranda	Marc Munden	
2005	Chromophobia	Martha Fiennes	
2005	Separate Lies	Julian Fellowes	
2006	Love and Other Disasters	Alek Keshishian	
2012	Blood	Nick Murphy	
2014	Before I Go to Sleep	Rowan Joffé	
2015	Queen of the Desert	Werner Herzog	
2016	Ali and Nino	Asif Kapadia	
2018	Mamma Mia! Here We Go Again	Ol Parker	
2018	The Death & Life of John F. Donovan	Xavier Dolan	
2020	The Secret Garden	Marc Munden	
2021	The King's Man	Matthew Vaughn	
2024	Apartment 7A	Natalie Erika James	
2027	The Legend of Zelda †	Wes Ball	Filming

=== Television ===
Year	Title	Notes
2005	Casanova	3 episodes
2005	My Family and Other Animals	Television film
2008	Sense and Sensibility	3 episodes
2008	The Devil's Whore	4 episodes
2009	The Diary of Anne Frank	5 episodes
2011–2019	Game of Thrones	65 episodes
2016	The Crown	10 episodes
2021–2023	The Nevers	6 episodes
2022	The Peripheral	8 episodes
2024	The Franchise	Episode: "Scene 31A: Tecto Meets Eye"

== Awards and nominations ==
Major associations

BAFTA Awards

Year	Category	Nominated work	Result	Ref.
British Academy Television Craft Awards
2009	Best Costume Design	The Devil's Whore	Won	
2017	Best Costume Design	The Crown	Won	
2018	Best Costume Design	Game of Thrones	Won	
2020	Best Costume Design	Game of Thrones	Nominated	

Emmy Awards

Year	Category	Nominated work	Result	Ref.
Primetime Emmy Awards
2011	Outstanding Costumes for a Series	Game of Thrones (Episode: "The Pointy End")	Nominated	
2012	Outstanding Costumes for a Series	Game of Thrones (Episode: "The Prince of Winterfell")	Won	
2013	Outstanding Costumes for a Series	Game of Thrones (Episode: "Walk of Punishment")	Nominated	
2014	Outstanding Costumes for a Series	Game of Thrones (Episode: "The Lion and the Rose")	Won	
2015	Outstanding Costumes for a Period/Fantasy Series, Limited Series or Movie	Game of Thrones (Episode: "The Dance of Dragons")	Nominated	
2016	Outstanding Costumes for a Period/Fantasy Series, Limited Series or Movie	Game of Thrones (Episode: "The Winds of Winter")	Won	
2017	Outstanding Costumes for a Period/Fantasy Series, Limited Series or Movie	The Crown (Episode: "Wolferton Splash")	Won	
2018	Outstanding Fantasy/Sci-Fi Costumes	Game of Thrones (Episode: "Beyond the Wall")	Won	
2019	Outstanding Fantasy/Sci-Fi Costumes	Game of Thrones (Episode: "The Bells")	Won	

Miscellaneous awards;

List of Michele Clapton other awards and nominations
Award	Year	Category	Title	Result	Ref.	
British Independent Film Awards	2020	Best Costume Design	The Secret Garden	Nominated		
CinEuphoria Awards	2020	Merit (Honorary Award)	n/a	Won		
Costume Designers Guild Awards	2009	Outstanding Made for Television Movie or Miniseries	Sense and Sensibility	Nominated		
Costume Designers Guild Awards	2012	Outstanding Period/Fantasy Television	Game of Thrones	Nominated		
Costume Designers Guild Awards	2013	Outstanding Period/Fantasy Television	Game of Thrones	Nominated		
Costume Designers Guild Awards	2014	Outstanding Period/Fantasy Television	Game of Thrones	Nominated		
Costume Designers Guild Awards	2015	Outstanding Period/Fantasy Television	Game of Thrones	Won		
Costume Designers Guild Awards	2016	Outstanding Fantasy Television	Game of Thrones	Won		
Costume Designers Guild Awards	2017	Outstanding Fantasy Television	Game of Thrones	Won		
Costume Designers Guild Awards	2017	Outstanding Period Television	The Crown	Won		Note: Clapton's wins in 2017 made her the first person to win two of the three Costume Designers Guild television awards in one night.
Costume Designers Guild Awards	2018	Excellence in Sci-Fi/Fantasy Television	Game of Thrones	Won		
Costume Designers Guild Awards	2019	Excellence in Contemporary Film	Mamma Mia! Here We Go Again	Nominated		
Costume Designers Guild Awards	2020	Excellence in Sci-Fi/Fantasy Television	Game of Thrones (Episode: "The Iron Throne")	Won		
Online Film & Television Association Awards	2012	OFTA Television Award-Best Costume Design in a Series		Won		
Online Film & Television Association Awards	2013	OFTA Television Award-Best Costume Design in a Series		Won		
Online Film & Television Association Awards	2014	OFTA Television Award-Best Costume Design in a Series		Won		
Online Film & Television Association Awards	2019	OFTA Television Award-Best Costume Design in a Series		Nominated		
Royal Television Society Craft & Design Awards	2005	Best Costume Design – Drama	Casanova	Won		
