= Soyon An =

American costume designer for film and television

- Occupations: Costume designer; producer
- Years active: 2009–present

Soyon An is an American costume designer for television and film. She is a two-time Primetime Emmy Award winner.

== Career ==
Soyon attended the Fashion Institute of Design and Merchandising and Otis College of Art and Design. She was a former designer at Forever 21. she started her career as a costume designer for Fox's television show American Idol and So You Think You Can Dance.

Soyon made her debut as a costume designer with the feature film Battle of the Year. She is a member of the Costume Designers Guild. She also worked on live shows Awakening at Wynn Las Vegas and for Britney Spears and Shania Twain in Las Vegas. She is a member of the Academy of Television Arts & Sciences.

== Filmography ==
=== Television ===
- 2006-2013 - So You Think You Can Dance
- 2009 - Superstars of Dance
- 2009-2012 - American Idol
- 2018 - The Hocus Pocus 25th Anniversary Halloween Bash
- 2020 - Julie and the Phantoms
- 2020 - Next in Fashion

=== Film ===
- 2015 - Jem and the Holograms
- 2014 - Step Up: All In
- 2013 - Battle of the Year

== Awards and nominations ==
Year	Result	Award	Category	Work	Ref.
2021	Won	Daytime Emmy Awards	Outstanding Costume Design/Styling for a Drama or Daytime Fiction Program	Julie and the Phantoms	
2015	Nominated	Costume Designers Guild Awards	Excellence in Short Form Design	The Hobbit: Kingdoms of Middle-earth "Dance Battle"	
2010	Won	Primetime Emmy Awards	Outstanding Costumes for a Variety, Nonfiction, or Reality Programming	So You Think You Can Dance - Episode 09-1266	
2009	Won	Primetime Emmy Awards	Outstanding Costumes for a Variety, Nonfiction, or Reality Programming	So You Think You Can Dance - Episode 415/416A	
