= Jacqueline West =

American costume designer

- Occupation: Costume designer
- Notable work: Dune; Killers of the Flower Moon; The Social Network; Quills

Jacqueline West is an American fashion and costume designer. Her accolades include a Costume Designers Guild Award, in addition to nominations for five Academy Awards and four BAFTA Awards. Her film credits include Quills (2000), The New World (2005), The Curious Case of Benjamin Button (2008), The Social Network (2010), The Tree of Life (2011), Argo (2012), The Revenant (2015), Dune (2021), its sequel Dune: Part Two (2024), and Killers of the Flower Moon (2023).

== Career ==
West began her career as a fashion designer in the San Francisco Bay Area, where she owned a boutique on Gilman Street in West Berkeley. There she created and sold her eponymous "Identikit by Jacqueline West" line.

West ventured into film costume design in the 1990s after being persuaded to do so by Philip Kaufman. She first worked for the director as a creative consultant on Henry & June (1990). Their professional relationship continued on the films Rising Sun (1993) and Quills (2000); for creating costumes in the latter, she garnered her first Academy Award nomination. West stated that Kaufman, who shaped her approach to dressing actors, was among the major influences on her career; the other was her mother, an avant-garde fashion designer of the 1940s and 1950s.

West worked with director David Fincher on The Curious Case of Benjamin Button (2008), which turned out to be a difficult task for her due to its epic scope and the need to maintain the integrity of each character's garments in a story that takes place through almost 100 years of different clothing styles and fashions. Another challenge was making Benjamin (Brad Pitt) look both old and young at the beginning of the film and young and old at the film's end. West later said that Pitt called her a method costumer for those approaches.

West and the Fashion Institute of Design & Merchandising established The Jacqueline West Scholarship for “an outstanding Native American interested in the study of fashion or costume design.”

== Filmography ==
Year	Title	Director	Notes
1990	Henry & June	Philip Kaufman	Creative consultant
1993	Rising Sun	Philip Kaufman	
2000	Quills	Philip Kaufman	
2000	Just One Night	Alan Jacobs	
2002	The Banger Sisters	Bob Dolman	
2002	Leo	Mehdi Norowzian	
2002	American Gun	Alan Jacobs	Costume consultant
2003	The League of Extraordinary Gentlemen	Stephen Norrington	
2005	Down in the Valley	David Jacobson	
2005	The New World	Terrence Malick	
2006	Lonely Hearts	Todd Robinson	
2007	The Invasion	Oliver Hirschbiegel; James McTeigue	
2008	The Curious Case of Benjamin Button	David Fincher	
2009	State of Play	Kevin Macdonald	
2010	The Social Network	David Fincher	
2011	Water for Elephants	Francis Lawrence	
2011	The Tree of Life	Terrence Malick	
2012	Argo	Ben Affleck	
2012	To the Wonder	Terrence Malick	
2014	The Gambler	Rupert Wyatt	
2014	Seventh Son	Sergei Bodrov	
2015	Knight of Cups	Terrence Malick	
2015	The Revenant	Alejandro González Iñárritu	
2016	Live by Night	Ben Affleck	
2017	Song to Song	Terrence Malick	
2017	Flesh and Sand	Alejandro González Iñárritu	Short film
2021	Dune	Denis Villeneuve	with Bob Morgan
2023	Killers of the Flower Moon	Martin Scorsese	
2024	Dune: Part Two	Denis Villeneuve	
2026	Digger	Alejandro González Iñárritu	
2026	Dune: Part Three †	Denis Villeneuve	Filming

Key
†	Denotes films that have not yet been released

== Awards and nominations ==
Major associations

Academy Awards

Year	Category	Nominated work	Result	Ref.
2001	Best Costume Design	Quills	Nominated	
2009	Best Costume Design	The Curious Case of Benjamin Button	Nominated	
2016	Best Costume Design	The Revenant	Nominated	
2022	Best Costume Design	Dune	Nominated	
2024	Best Costume Design	Killers of the Flower Moon	Nominated	

BAFTA Awards

Year	Category	Nominated work	Result	Ref.
British Academy Film Awards
2001	Best Costume Design	Quills	Nominated	
2009	Best Costume Design	The Curious Case of Benjamin Button	Nominated	
2022	Best Costume Design	Dune	Nominated	
2024	Best Costume Design	Killers of the Flower Moon	Nominated	

Miscellaneous awards

List of Jacqueline West other awards and nominations
Award	Year (Note: Indicates the year of ceremony. Each year is linked to the article about the awards held that year, wherever possible.)	Category	Title	Result	Ref.
Astra Film and Creative Arts Awards	2022	Best Costume Design	Dune	Nominated	
Astra Film and Creative Arts Awards	2024	Best Costume Design	Killers of the Flower Moon	Nominated	
Astra Film and Creative Arts Awards	2024	Best Costume Design	Dune: Part Two	Nominated	
Chicago Film Critics Association Awards	2021	Best Costume Design	Dune	Nominated	
Chicago Film Critics Association Awards	2023	Best Costume Design	Killers of the Flower Moon	Nominated	
Chicago Film Critics Association Awards	2024	Best Costume Design	Dune: Part Two	Nominated	
Costume Designers Guild Awards	2001	Excellence in Period/Fantasy Film	Quills	Nominated	
Costume Designers Guild Awards	2009	Excellence in Period Film	The Curious Case of Benjamin Button	Nominated	
Costume Designers Guild Awards	2011	Excellence in Contemporary Film	The Social Network	Nominated	
Costume Designers Guild Awards	2013	Excellence in Period Film	Argo	Nominated	
Costume Designers Guild Awards	2022	Excellence in Sci-Fi/Fantasy Film	Dune	Won	
Costume Designers Guild Awards	2024	Excellence in Period Film	Killers of the Flower Moon	Nominated	
Costume Designers Guild Awards	2025	Excellence in Sci-Fi/Fantasy Film	Dune: Part Two	Nominated	
Critics' Choice Awards	2022	Best Costume Design	Dune	Nominated	
Critics' Choice Awards	2024	Best Costume Design	Killers of the Flower Moon	Nominated	
Critics' Choice Awards	2025	Best Costume Design	Dune: Part Two	Nominated	
Las Vegas Film Critics Society Awards	2000	Best Costume Design	Quills	Nominated	
Las Vegas Film Critics Society Awards	2008	Best Costume Design	The Curious Case of Benjamin Button	Won	
Las Vegas Film Critics Society Awards	2021	Best Costume Design	Dune	Nominated	
Las Vegas Film Critics Society Awards	2024	Best Costume Design	Dune: Part Two	Nominated	
Online Film Critics Society Awards	2022	Best Costume Design	Dune	Won	
Online Film Critics Society Awards	2024	Best Costume Design	Killers of the Flower Moon	Nominated	
Online Film Critics Society Awards	2025	Best Costume Design	Dune: Part Two	Won	
Phoenix Film Critics Society Awards	2001	Best Costume Design	Quills	Nominated	
Phoenix Film Critics Society Awards	2021	Best Costume Design	Dune	Won	
San Diego Film Critics Society Awards	2022	Best Costume Design	Dune	Nominated	
San Diego Film Critics Society Awards	2023	Best Costume Design	Killers of the Flower Moon	Nominated	
San Diego Film Critics Society Awards	2024	Best Costume Design	Dune: Part Two	Nominated	
Santa Barbara International Film Festival	2016	Variety Artisans Award	The Revenant	Won	
Santa Barbara International Film Festival	2022	Variety Artisans Award	Dune	Won	
Satellite Awards	2008	Best Costume Design	The Curious Case of Benjamin Button	Nominated	
Satellite Awards	2011	Best Costume Design	Water for Elephants	Won	
Satellite Awards	2022	Best Costume Design	Dune	Nominated	
Satellite Awards	2024	Best Costume Design	Killers of the Flower Moon	Nominated	
Satellite Awards	2025	Best Costume Design	Dune: Part Two	Nominated	
Saturn Awards	2004	Best Costume Design	The League of Extraordinary Gentlemen	Nominated	
Saturn Awards	2022	Best Costume Design	Dune	Nominated	
Saturn Awards	2025	Best Costume Design	Dune: Part Two	Nominated	
Seattle Film Critics Society Awards (Note: prior to the SFCS formal establishment in 2016, a group of Seattle-area critics compiled the Seattle Film Critics Awards in 2014 and 2015.)	2016	Best Costume Design	The Revenant	Nominated	
Seattle Film Critics Society Awards	2022	Best Costume Design	Dune	Nominated	
Seattle Film Critics Society Awards	2024	Best Costume Design	Killers of the Flower Moon	Nominated	
Seattle Film Critics Society Awards	2024	Best Costume Design	Dune: Part Two	Nominated	
St. Louis Film Critics Association Awards	2021	Best Costume Design	Dune	Nominated	
St. Louis Film Critics Association Awards	2023	Best Costume Design	Killers of the Flower Moon	Nominated	
St. Louis Film Critics Association Awards	2024	Best Costume Design	Dune: Part Two	Nominated	
