= Jany Temime =

French costume designer

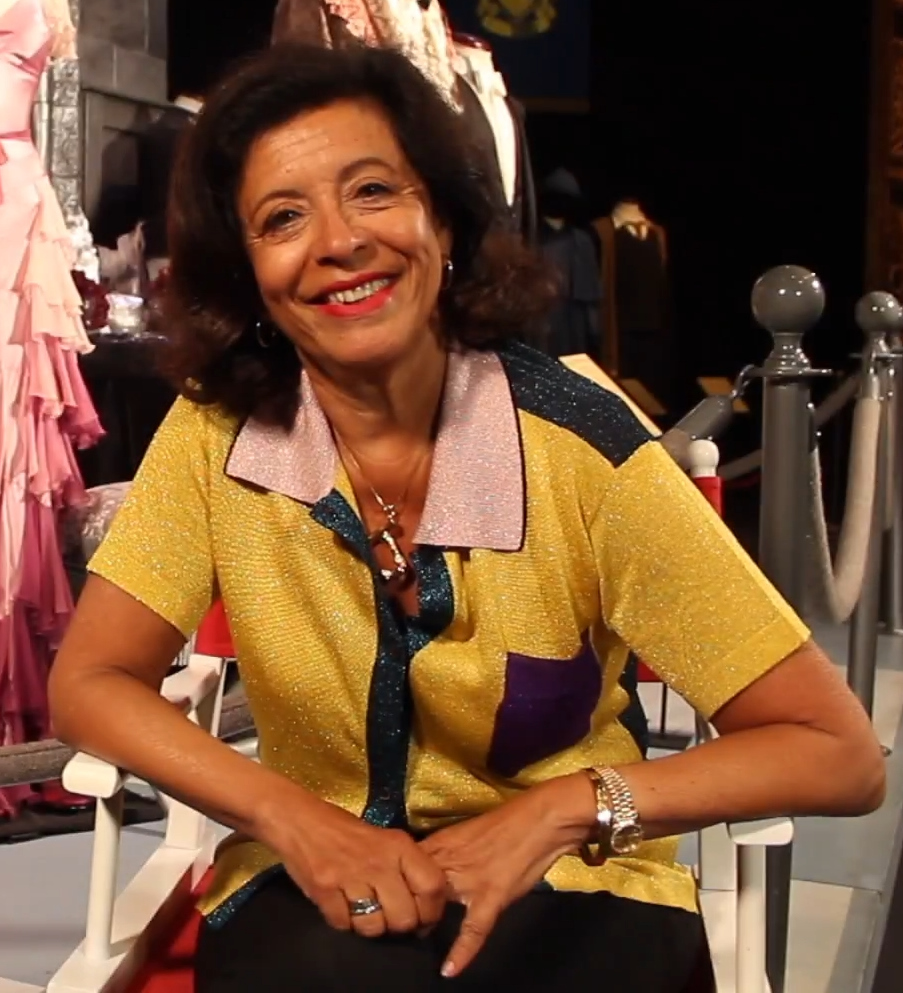
- Temime in 2018
- Born: France
- Other names: Jany Fischer; Jany Hubar; Janine Hubar; Jany Van Hellenberg Hubar
- Education: Paris Nanterre University (MA)
- Occupation: Costume designer
- Years active: 1975–present

Jany Temime is a French costume designer. She is best known for her work on the final six films in the Harry Potter film series, each of which garnered her Saturn Award nominations. She won the Costume Designers Guild Award in 2012 for the 2011 film Harry Potter and the Deathly Hallows – Part 2 and in 2013 for the 2012 film Skyfall.

== Early life ==
Temime spent most of her childhood in Paris, France. The daughter of French ready-to-wear company owners, she progressed from creating outfits for her dolls to designing, fitting, and producing costumes for her entire class's school play at the age of eight. In Paris, she earned master's degrees in French and Literature (or Latin) at Paris Nanterre University, as well as a certificate in Art History. Her first job was at lifestyle magazine Elle as a fashion journalist.

== Career ==
While training at Elle, Temime was advised to start a career in the film industry. She subsequently moved to the Netherlands where she started by designing for short films and commercials. She later gained recognition for her work on several major Dutch film productions, such as De Lift, Ciske de Rat, Op hoop van zegen, as well as Academy Award-winning productions Antonia's Line and Character. After moving to London, England, Temime served as costume designer for the last six films in the Harry Potter film series, the 2013 film Gravity, and two films in the James Bond film series, Skyfall and Spectre, elevating her expertise to international recognition.

Succeeding Lindy Hemming as costume designer for the third film of the Harry Potter film series, Harry Potter and the Prisoner of Azkaban, Temime was tasked with reinventing the established look of the then two-part-series. Highlighting the actors' coming of age and giving the series an overall more realistic and relatable look was important for both Temime and the film's director Alfonso Cuarón who had also been new to the series. Though Cuarón would not be involved with any future installments, Temime kept her role up until the final film, each new film challenging her to adapt her costumes to the characters' growing age and unique arcs.

After working on several period films and a decade of designing for the Harry Potter fantasy series, Temime transitioned to designing reality-based space suits for the 2013 film Gravity, which, as she claims in an interview with The New York Times, proved to be her biggest technical challenge up until that point. After thorough research into actual space suit designs, Temime had to make significant – preferably unnoticeable – changes to accommodate the actors, while still retaining a scientifically accurate look. In order to allow lead actress Sandra Bullock to easily open the suit and undress by herself, Temime moved the zipper to the front of the torso and removed the cooling garment and diaper, changes that were criticized by the scientific community. For the project, Temime deviated from her usual pen-to-paper approach to conceptualization and created the costumes in a digital 3D environment instead.

With her involvement in the 23rd and 24th James Bond film, Skyfall and Spectre, Temime's work was specifically centered around adjusting the Bond girl's appearance to today's society's idea of femininity, as well as making their outfits more functional and logical. Whereas older entries meant to dress Bond girls solely for the purpose of eye candy, modern Bond girls were supposed to have a more sophisticated, feminist, and independent approach to their style, according to Temime.

Temime declined to return as costume designer for the Harry Potter spin-off film Fantastic Beasts and Where to Find Them because she felt that her involvement with the franchise was meant to end after the conclusion of the main series.

In 2017, Temime joined artists' supply brand Prismacolor, products of which she frequently uses for her own work, as an advocate.

== Controversy ==
During the promotion of Harry Potter and the Deathly Hallows – Part 1 in 2010, Temime, who served as the film's costume designer, was widely accused of copying a dress from the Alexander McQueen fall 2008 collection "The Girl Who Lived in the Tree" for the film. The white layered tulle dress, worn by the character Fleur Delacour in the context of a wedding ceremony, features a pattern of two phoenixes facing each other on the bodice and black over-laid peacock feathers dissolving down the length of the dress. The latter appears to be directly copied from the Alexander McQueen dress, while the peacock motif was slightly altered to more closely resemble the phoenix. Temime has commented in an interview with the Los Angeles Times that she wanted the dress to be a "witch wedding dress but not a Halloween dress. The dress is white but it needed to have something fantastic to it. So there is the phoenix [motif], the bird, which is a symbol of love in a way because there is rebirth, love never dies, it is born again."

== Personal life ==
Temime has maintained a friendship with actress Emma Watson, whom she dressed for the role of Hermione Granger in Harry Potter over a span of six films. As Watson began modelling for such brands as Chanel and Burberry, Temime was hired as her stylist for film premieres.

== Filmography ==
=== Film ===
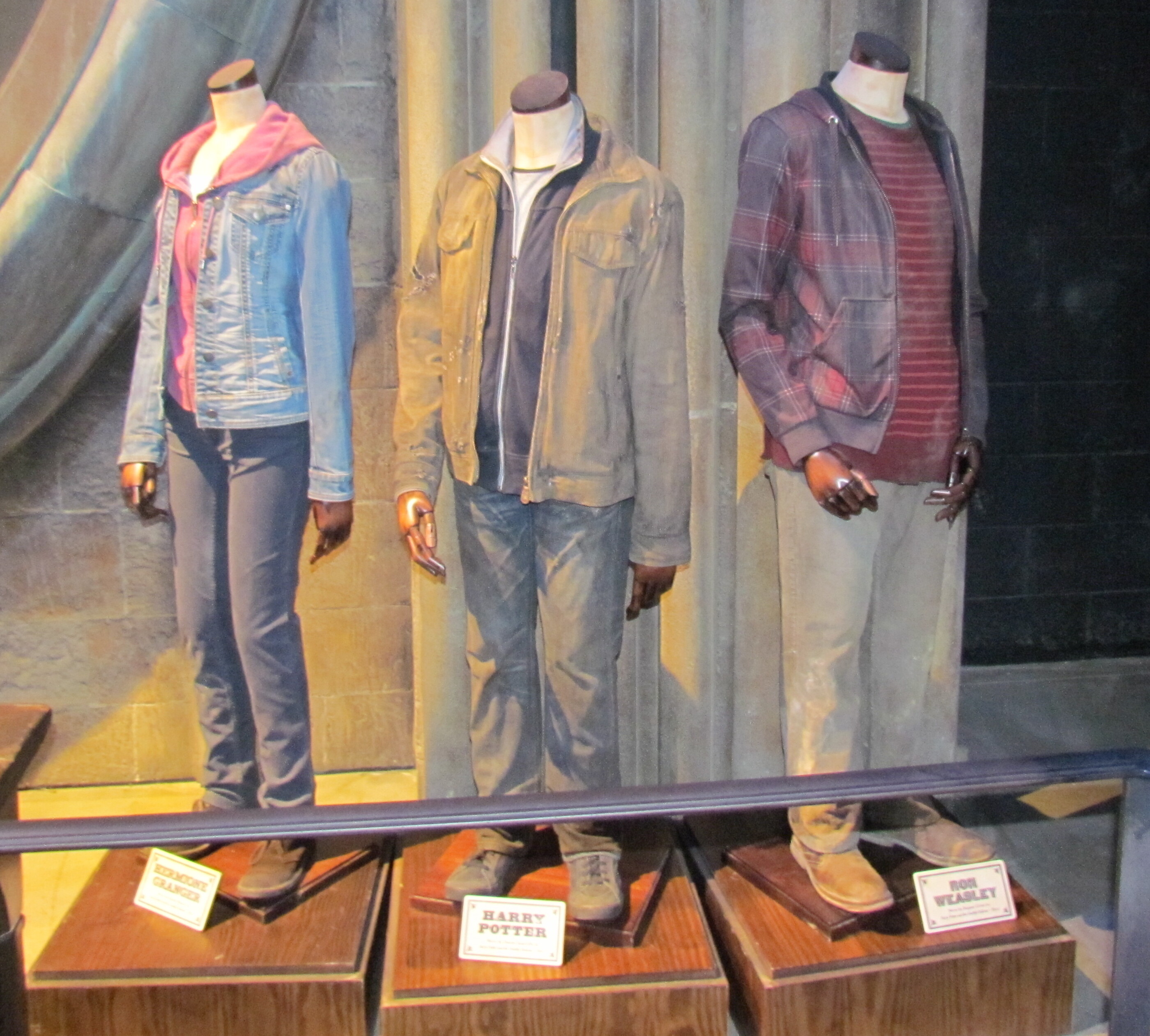
Costumes of (from left to right) Emma Watson as Hermione Granger, Daniel Radcliffe as Harry Potter, and Rupert Grint as Ron Weasley in Harry Potter and the Deathly Hallows – Part 2

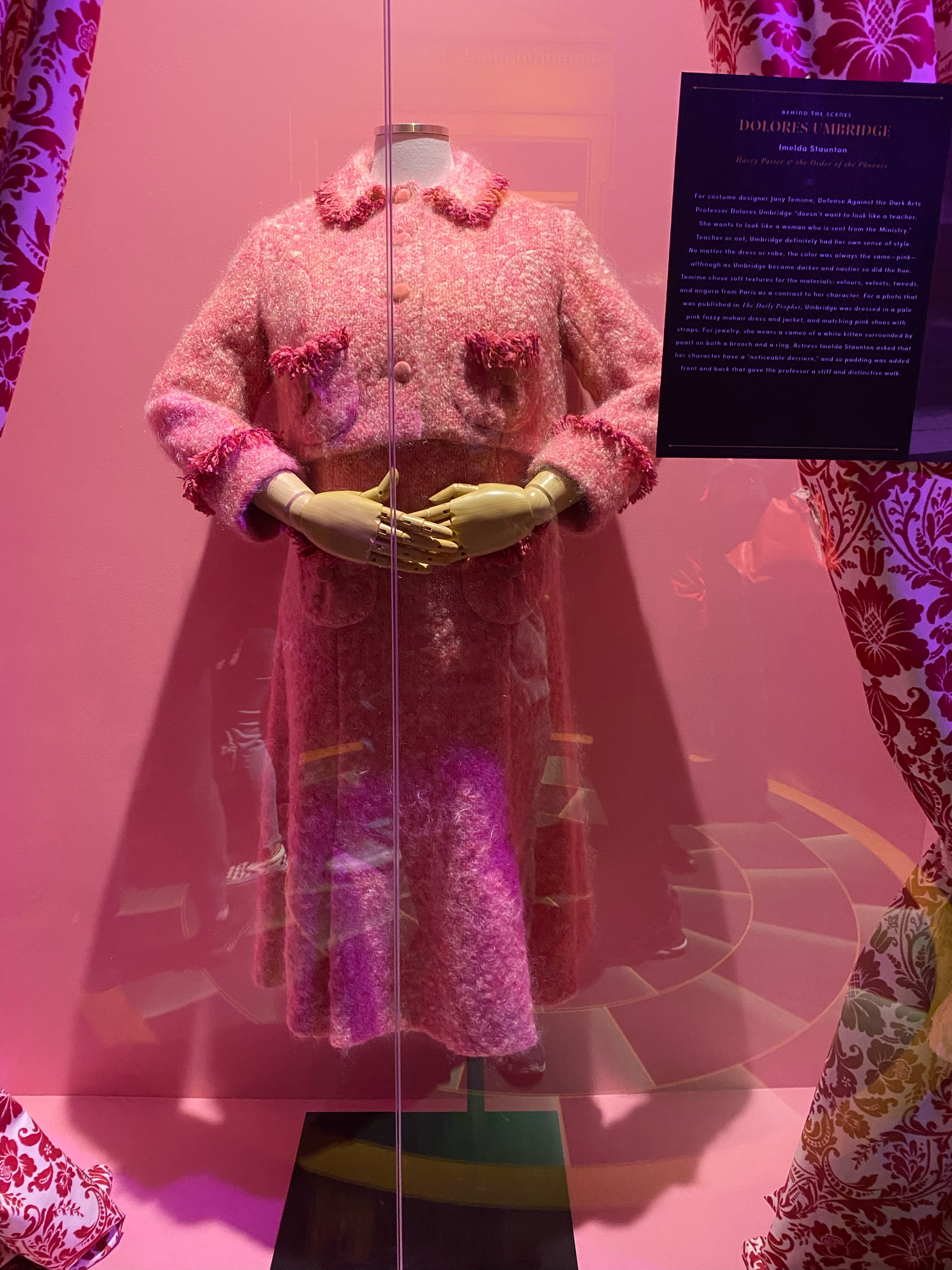
Costume of Imelda Staunton as Dolores Umbridge

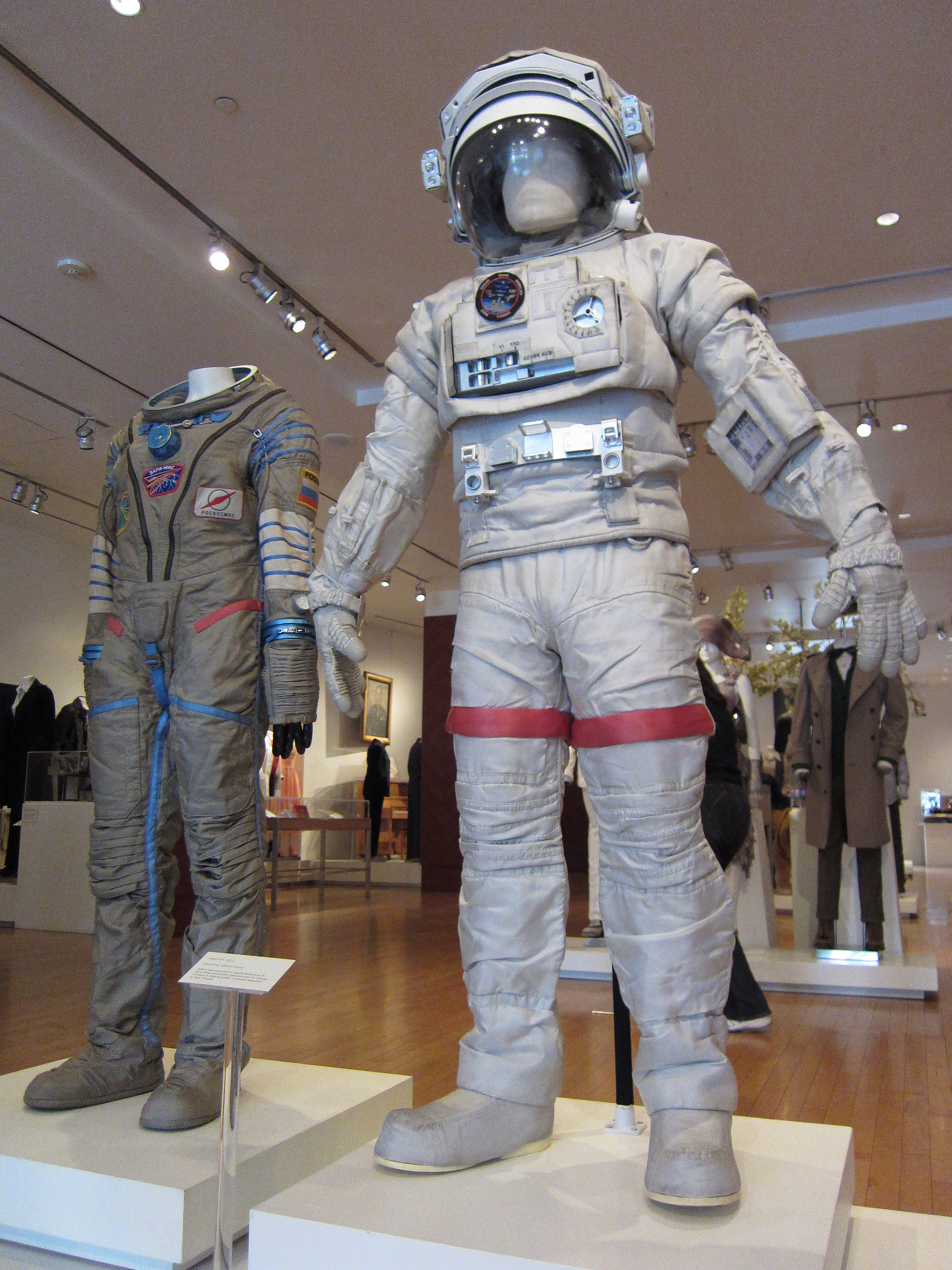
Costumes of Sandra Bullock as Dr. Ryan Stone (left) and George Clooney as Lieutenant Matt Kowalski (right) in Gravity

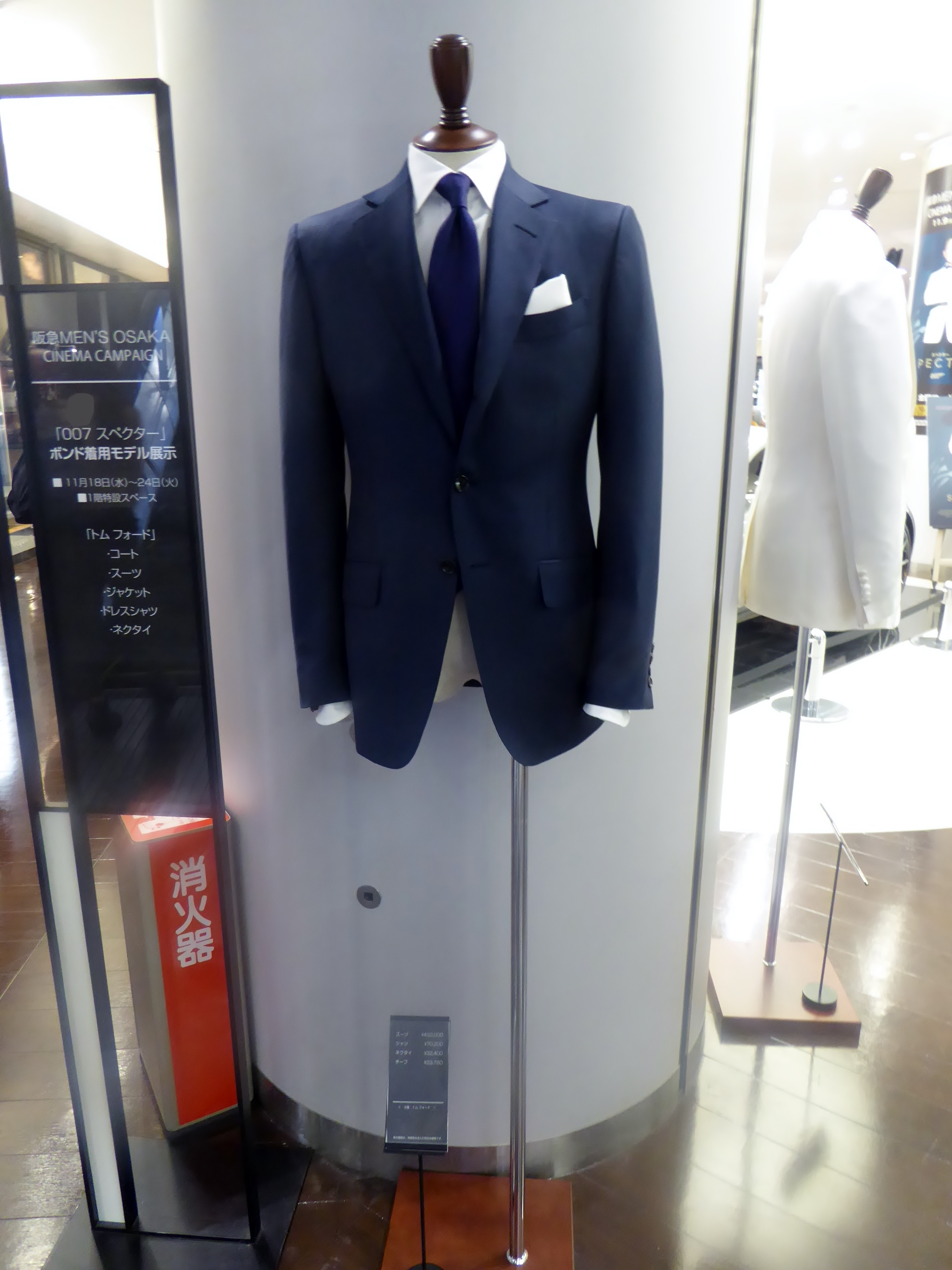
Costume of Daniel Craig as James Bond in Spectre

Year	Title	Notes
1975	Red Sien	as Jany Fischer
1979	Uit elkaar	as Janine Hubar
1980	The Lucky Star	as Jany Van Hellenberg Hubar
1982	A Question of Silence	as Jany Hubar
1983	Een zaak van leven of dood	as Jany Hubar
1983	De Lift	as Jany Hubar
1984	Ciske de Rat	as Jany Hubar
1985	Private Resistance	as Jany Van Hellenberg Hubar
1985	De prooi	as Jany Van Hellenberg Hubar
1985	The Dream	as Jany Hubar
1986	Op hoop van zegen	as Jany Van Hellenberg Hubar
1988	Honneponnetje	as Jany Van Hellenberg Hubar
1989	Rituelen	
1990	In the Shadow of the Sandcastle	as Jany Hubar
1992	The Johnsons	
1992	For a Lost Soldier	
1993	Belle van Zuylen – Madame de Charrière	
1993	Unknown Time	
1994	1000 Roses	
1994	The Butterfly Lifts the Cat Up	
1995	Last Call	
1995	Antonia's Line	
1995	All Men Are Mortal	
1996	Crimetime	
1997	Character	
1997	House of America	Won—BAFTA Cymru Award for Best Costume 1998
1998	The Commissioner	
1999	Sunset Heights	
1999	De bal	
2000	Rancid Aluminium	
2000	Gangster No. 1	
2000	The Luzhin Defence	
2001	High Heels and Low Lifes	
2001	Invincible	
2002	La balsa de piedra	
2002	A Family Man	
2002	Moonlight	
2003	Resistance	
2004	Harry Potter and the Prisoner of Azkaban	Nominated—Saturn Award for Best Costume Design 2005
2004	Bridget Jones: The Edge of Reason	
2005	Harry Potter and the Goblet of Fire	Nominated—Saturn Award for Best Costume Design 2006; Nominated—Satellite Award for Best Costume Design 2005
2006	Copying Beethoven	
2006	Children of Men	
2007	Harry Potter and the Order of the Phoenix	Nominated—Saturn Award for Best Costume Design 2008; Nominated—Costume Designers Guild Award for Excellence in Fantasy Film 2008
2008	In Bruges	
2009	Harry Potter and the Half-Blood Prince	Nominated—Saturn Award for Best Costume Design 2010
2010	Harry Potter and the Deathly Hallows – Part 1	Nominated—Saturn Award for Best Costume Design 2011
2011	Harry Potter and the Deathly Hallows – Part 2	Nominated—Saturn Award for Best Costume Design 2012; Nominated—Award Circuit Community Award for Best Achievement in Costume Design 2011; Won—Costume Designers Guild Award for Excellence in Fantasy Film 2012
2012	Wrath of the Titans	
2012	Skyfall	Won—Costume Designers Guild Award for Excellence in Contemporary Film 2013
2013	Gravity	
2014	Hercules	
2015	Spectre	
2015	Victor Frankenstein	
2016	Passengers	
2017	Film Stars Don't Die in Liverpool	
2019	The Kid Who Would Be King	
2019	Judy	Nominated—British Independent Film Award for Best Costume Design 2019; Nominated—Satellite Award for Best Costume Design 2020; Nominated—BAFTA Award for Best Costume Design 2020
2019	6 Underground	
2021	Black Widow	

=== Television ===
Year	Title	Notes
1976	Sil de Strandjutter	as Jany Fischer
1982	Tony	as Jany Hubar
1989	Beppie	
1991	De Dageraad	
1994	Coma	
1994	Pril geluk	
1995	Achilles en het zebrapad	
1995	De Partizanen	
1996	Marrakech	
1996	In naam der Koningin	
1998	Het glinsterend panster	
2022	House of the Dragon	10 episodes; Won—Costume Designers Guild Award for Excellence in Sci-Fi/Fantasy Television 2023
2024	Disclaimer	

== Awards and honours ==
BAFTA Awards, Wales

- 1998: House of America, Best Costume.

Costume Designers Guild Awards

- 2012: Harry Potter and the Deathly Hallows – Part 2, Excellence in Fantasy Film.
- 2013: Skyfall, Excellence in Contemporary Film.
- 2023: House of the Dragon, Excellence in Sci-Fi/Fantasy Television.

Netherlands Film Festival

- 1995: Special Jury Prize for her costume designs.

Rembrandt Awards

- 2010: Honorary Rembrandt Award for her work as costume designer.
