= Jane Clive =

British costume designer

- Occupation: Costume designer
- Years active: 1989-present

Jane Clive is a British costume designer. She is known for her work on movies Henry V, Restoration, Topsy-Turvy, Snow White and the Huntsman and Maleficent.

She was nominated for a Costume Designers Guild Award for her work on Maleficent.

== Selected filmography ==
- Henry V (1989)
- Little Buddha (1993)
- Mary Shelley's Frankenstein (1994)
- Angels and Insects (1995)
- Restoration (1995)
- Lost in Space (1998)
- Topsy-Turvy (1999)
- Quills (2000)
- From Hell (2001)
- Planet of the Apes (2001)
- Shanghai Knights (2003)
- Around the World in 80 Days (2004)
- Oliver Twist (2005)
- Sahara (2005)
- Captain America: The First Avenger (2011)
- Snow White and the Huntsman (2012)
- Maleficent (2014)
