= Dan Lester =

American costume designer

Daniel Lester is an American costume designer best known for his work on military themed films based in the Middle East (The Hurt Locker, Zero Dark Thirty, 12 Strong, Man Down). He was nominated for a Costume Designer's Guild Award for his work on Once Upon A Time in 2018.

Lester moved to Los Angeles in the 1970s to open a boutique in Hollywood where he met many of the top industry artists. After years of setting up TV and film productions he began working as a costumer full time, beginning with highly respected designers including Academy Award winners Theodora Van Runkle and Moss Mabry.

Lester formed a partnership with Marilyn Vance and worked together on a string of iconic films including The Untouchables, Pretty Woman, Uncle Buck, The Rocketeer, and Little Monsters. During this period he received an Emmy nomination for his work on the television show Dallas: The Early Years. He moved on to work as a solo costume designer on Timecop, and continued with Spawn, The Relic, Sudden Death, The Core, and I Still Know What You Did Last Summer. He has worked on television shows such as The A-Team, Dallas: The Early Years, CSI, Eleventh Hour, and Once Upon A Time.

Dan Lester was born in Minnesota in 1954 and currently lives in Los Angeles, where he has resided for the last 40 years.
