= Sammy Sheldon Differ =

British costume designer for film

- Occupation: Costume Designer
- Notable work: V for Vendetta, Kick-Ass, The Imitation Game
- Partner: Ian Differ

Sammy Sheldon Differ (also credited as Sammy Sheldon and Sammy Howarth-Sheldon) is a British costume designer known for her work in film, specializing in fantasy and superhero genres. Differ has been nominated for multiple awards, including BAFTAs, Saturn Awards, and Costume Designers Guild Awards.

== Early life and education ==
Born and raised in Rhodes, Manchester, England, Differ developed an interest in costume design after seeing Star Wars at the age of 10. She studied at Rochdale College, and gained work experience at the Royal Exchange Theatre, before studying costume design at the Wimbledon School of Art.

== Career ==
Differ designed costumes for music videos early in her career. It was during this time she met costume designer Janty Yates, who hired her as an assistant on Plunkett and Macleane, and then Ridley Scott's Gladiator (2000). Differ subsequently undertook her first role as lead costume designer on Scott's Black Hawk Down (2001) in a role in which she researched Somali clothing and sourced a combination of vintage garments and traditional fabrics to create outfits for nearly 3,000 actors.

Differ's design process often involves painting, drawing and extensive research. Her work on Stardust (2007) established her reputation within the fantasy genre and started a trio of collaborations with director Matthew Vaughn. She also worked on comic book adaptations V for Vendetta (2007), Kick-Ass (2010) and its sequel (2013), and video game adaptation Assassin's Creed (2016). Her designs for Kick-Ass showcased her ability to interpret comic book aesthetics into live-action cinema. For the design of the Red Mist costume, Differ worked extensively with the comic's creator Mark Millar. Assassin's Creed presented the challenge of adapting video game costumes for film, requiring her to consider the aesthetics of the original character and the practicality of the costumes for the actors.

Differ has worked on several Marvel Cinematic Universe films: Ant-Man (2015), Eternals (2021) and Ant-Man and the Wasp: Quantumania (2023). For Ant-Man, she opted for leather instead of spandex to create a more tactile and nostalgic feel for the superhero suit, referencing 1960s biker suits. For X-Men: First Class (2011), another Marvel project, Differ incorporated Kevlar, a material invented around the time the film is set, into the costumes.

In 2014, Differ was nominated for a Costume Designers Guild Award for the costumes for Ex Machina, a critically acclaimed science fiction thriller. Differ explained how the costumes for Alicia Vikander's character were "incredibly intricate, going far beyond what you’d expect to have to deal with on, say, a Lycra bodysuit. I used a stretchy polyurethane with metal powder poured onto it to create the mesh, which covered her entire body".

Beyond fantasy and action, Differ designed the period costumes for The Imitation Game (2014), using original World War II-era clothing and incorporating subtle colours, textures and prints. For the Agatha Christie adaptation A Haunting in Venice (2023), she designed post-World War II period costumes. One critic described her as a "gifted collaborator" of director Kenneth Branagh.

In 2012, Differ became a member of the Academy of Motion Picture Arts and Sciences.

== Awards and nominations ==
| Year | Work | Award | Category | Result | Ref. |
|---|---|---|---|---|---|
| 2004 | The Canterbury Tales | BAFTA Awards | Best Costume Design | Nominated | |
| 2005 | The Merchant of Venice | BAFTA Awards | Best Costume Design | Nominated | |
| 2007 | V for Vendetta | Costume Designers Guild Awards | Excellence in Fantasy Film | Nominated | |
| 2007 | V for Vendetta | Academy of Science Fiction, Fantasy and Horror Films | Saturn Award | Nominated | |
| 2008 | Stardust | Academy of Science Fiction, Fantasy and Horror Films | Saturn Award | Nominated | |
| 2012 | X-Men: First Class | Costume Designers Guild Awards | Excellence in Fantasy Film | Nominated | |
| 2014 | Ex Machina | Costume Designers Guild Awards | Excellence in Fantasy Film | Nominated | |
| 2015 | The Imitation Game | BAFTA Awards | Best Costume Design | Nominated | |
| 2015 | The Imitation Game | Costume Designers Guild Awards | Excellence in Period Film | Nominated | |
| 2019 | Annihilation | CinEuphoria Awards | Best Costume Design - International Competition | Nominated | |
| 2021 | Eternals | Academy of Science Fiction, Fantasy and Horror Films | Saturn Award | Nominated | |
