= Janty Yates =

British costume designer (born 1950)

- Born: 1950 (age 75–76)
- Occupation: Costume designer
- Years active: 1981–present

Janty Yates (born 1950) is a British costume designer for film and television. In 2001, she won the Academy Award for Best Costume Design for Gladiator (2000). She has also received nominations for BAFTA Awards, Satellite Awards, and Saturn Awards. She is a frequent collaborator with English director Ridley Scott, having worked with him fourteen times as of 2021.

== Career ==
Janty Yates worked in the fashion industry prior to her career in film and television. Yates' first credited work was in the wardrobe department on the 1981 film Quest for Fire. Her first credited role as a costume designer was for the 1993 British comedy Bad Behaviour, and she worked on a further six films in that role for the rest of the decade.

In 2000, her work on Ridley Scott's Gladiator earned her her first career awards, including the Academy Award for Best Costume Design, and the Las Vegas Film Critics Society award for Best Costume Design, as well as nominations for a BAFTA Award for Best Costume Design and Satellite Award for Best Costume Design. In 2005, she received Best Costume Design nominations from the Costume Designers Guild and Satellite Awards for the 2004 period film De-Lovely. The following year she received her first Goya Award nomination and her third Satellite award nomination for Best Costume Design for Kingdom of Heaven.

In 2006, Yates was one of 120 people invited to join the Academy of Motion Picture Arts and Sciences.

Yates is a frequent collaborator with Scott, having worked on thirteen films with him in addition to Gladiator, including: Hannibal (2001); Kingdom of Heaven (2005); American Gangster (2007); Body of Lies (2008); Robin Hood (2010), for which she received a Saturn Award nomination and her fourth Satellite Award nomination; Prometheus (2012), Exodus: Gods and Kings (2014), and The Martian (2015). Her most recent films with Scott include the epic historical drama film The Last Duel and the biographical crime drama film House of Gucci, both released in 2021.

== Filmography ==
Film (all roles are "costume designer" unless otherwise stated)
Year	Title	Director	Notes
1981	Quest for Fire	Jean-Jacques Annaud	Wardrobe
1984	Oxford Blues	Robert Boris	Wardrobe assistant
1985	Dance with a Stranger	Mike Newell	Costume supervisor
1988	Soursweet	Mike Newell	Wardrobe designer
1991	The Commitments	Alan Parker	Wardrobe supervisor
1993	Bad Behaviour	Les Blair	
1995	The Englishman who Went up a Hill but Came down a Mountain	Christopher Monger	
1996	Jude	Michael Winterbottom	
1997	Welcome to Sarajevo	Michael Winterbottom	
1998	The Man Who Knew Too Little	Jon Amiel	
1999	Plunkett & Macleane	Jake Scott	
1999	With or Without You	Michael Winterbottom	
2000	Gladiator	Ridley Scott	
2001	Charlotte Gray	Gillian Armstrong	
2001	Enemy at the Gates	Jean-Jacques Annaud	
2001	Hannibal	Ridley Scott	
2004	De-Lovely	Irwin Winkler	
2005	Kingdom of Heaven	Ridley Scott	
2006	Miami Vice	Michael Mann	with Michael Kaplan
2007	American Gangster	Ridley Scott	
2008	Body of Lies	Ridley Scott	Costumes designed by
2010	Robin Hood	Ridley Scott	
2012	Prometheus	Ridley Scott	
2013	The Counselor	Ridley Scott	
2014	Exodus: Gods and Kings	Ridley Scott	
2015	The Martian	Ridley Scott	
2017	Alien: Covenant	Ridley Scott	
2017	All the Money in the World	Ridley Scott	
2021	The Last Duel	Ridley Scott	
2021	House of Gucci	Ridley Scott	
2023	Napoleon	Ridley Scott	with Dave Crossman
2024	Gladiator II	Ridley Scott	with Dave Crossman
2026	The Dog Stars	Ridley Scott	

Television
Year	Title	Notes
1989	The Endless Game	2 episodes
1995	The Glam Metal Detectives	5 episodes
1996	Karaoke	4 episodes

== Awards and nominations ==
Year	Award	Category	Work	Result	Ref
2000	Academy Awards	Academy Award for Best Costume Design	Gladiator	Won	
2000	Las Vegas Film Critics Society	Sierra Award for Best Costume Design	Gladiator	Won	
2000	British Academy Film Awards	BAFTA Award for Best Costume Design	Gladiator	Nominated	
2000	Satellite Awards	Satellite Award for Best Costume Design	Gladiator	Nominated	
2004	Costume Designers Guild	Costume Designers Guild Award for Excellence in Period/Fantasy Film	De-Lovely	Nominated	
2004	Satellite Awards	Best Costume Design	De-Lovely	Nominated	
2005	Goya Awards	Best Costume Design	Kingdom of Heaven	Nominated	
2005	Satellite Awards	Best Costume Design	Kingdom of Heaven	Nominated	
2010	Saturn Awards	Saturn Award for Best Costume	Robin Hood	Nominated	
2010	Satellite Awards	Best Costume Design	Robin Hood	Nominated	
2021	St. Louis Film Critics Association	Best Costume Design	House of Gucci	Nominated	
2022	San Diego Film Critics Society	Best Costumes	House of Gucci	Nominated	
2022	Seattle Film Critics Society	Best Costume Design	House of Gucci	Nominated	
2022	Hollywood Critics Association	Best Costume Design	House of Gucci	Nominated	
2022	Critics' Choice Movie Awards	Best Costume Design	House of Gucci	Nominated	
2024	Academy Awards	Academy Award for Best Costume Design	Napoleon	Nominated	
2025	Academy Awards	Academy Award for Best Costume Design	Gladiator II	Nominated	
