= Isis Mussenden =

American costume designer (born 1959)

- Born: 22 May 1959 (age 67); Los Angeles, California, United States
- Occupation: Costume Designer

Isis Mussenden (born May 22, 1959) is an American costume designer and a member of the Costume Designers Guild. Mussenden won the 2006 Costume Designers Guild Award for excellence in fantasy film for The Chronicles of Narnia: The Lion, the Witch and the Wardrobe. Mussenden has worked on numerous well-known films including American Psycho, Drag Me to Hell, and Jay and Silent Bob Strike Back. Mussenden was invited to join the Academy of Motion Picture Arts and Sciences in 2008.

== Filmography ==
=== Film ===
- Velvet Buzzsaw (2019)
- The Wolverine (2013)
- The Chronicles of Narnia: The Voyage of the Dawn Treader (2010)
- Drag Me to Hell (2009)
- The Chronicles of Narnia: Prince Caspian (2008)
- The Chronicles of Narnia: The Lion, the Witch and the Wardrobe (2005)
- Shrek 2 (2004)
- Dirty Dancing: Havana Nights (2004)
- Jay and Silent Bob Strike Back (2001)
- Shrek (2001)
- American Psycho (2000)
- The Astronaut's Wife (1999)
- Dante’s Peak (1997)
- Shocker (1989)

=== Television ===
- The Wheel of Time (2021)
- Masters of Sex (2013-2016)
