= Deborah Lynn Scott =

American costume designer

Deborah L. Scott
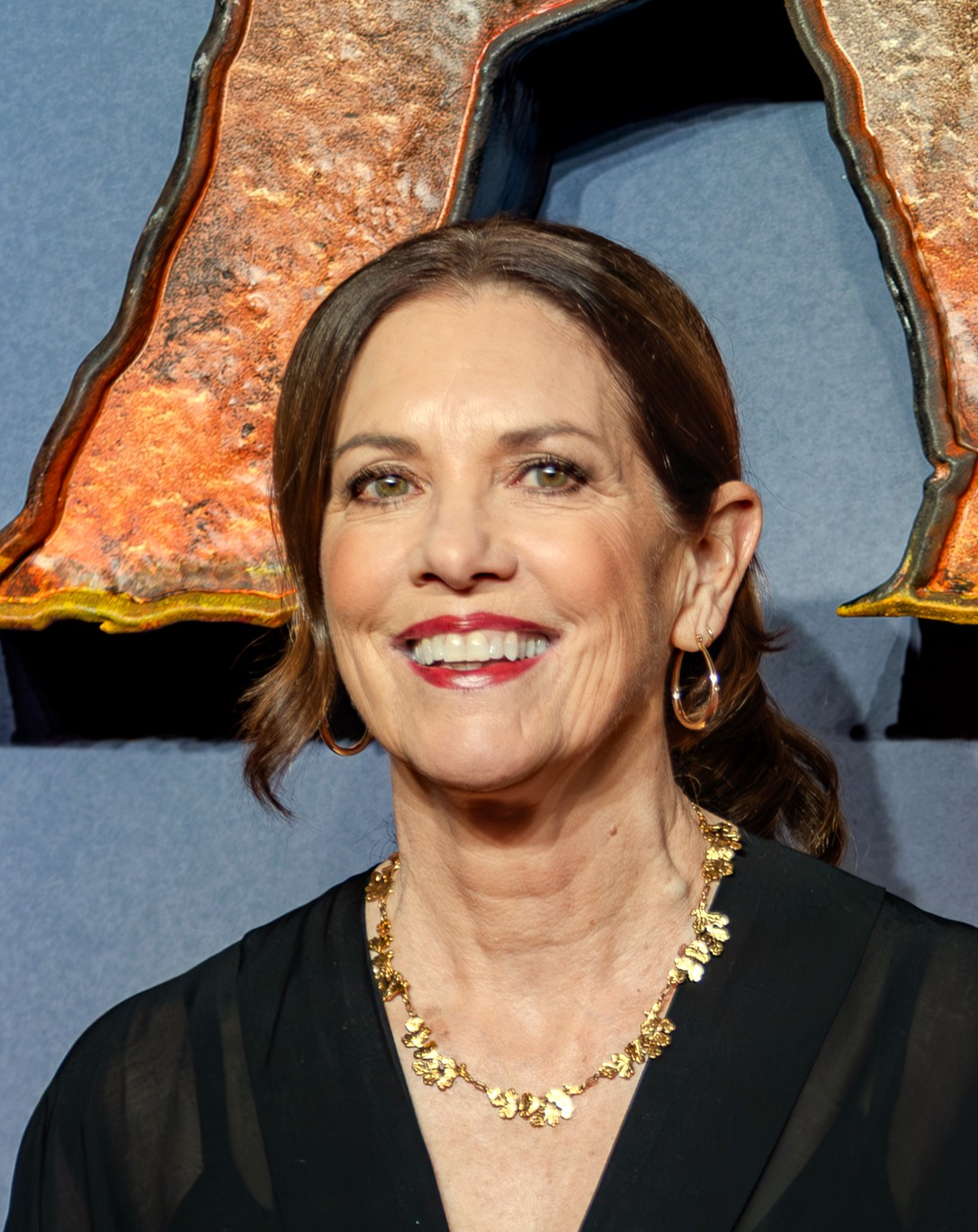
- Scott in 2025
- Born: 1954 (age 71–72)
- Education: California State University, Northridge
- Known for: Costume and set designer
- Children: 2

Deborah Lynn Scott (born 1954), also known as Deborah Scott, is a costume designer and set designer, best known for her work in James Cameron's directorial venture Titanic which won her the Academy Award for Best Costume Design. Scott collaborated with Cameron with his three films in the Avatar film series, earning her second Academy Award nomination for her costume design on Avatar: Fire and Ash.

Her first movie as a costume designer was Don't Answer the Phone (1979). Some of her other movies are E.T. the Extra-Terrestrial (1982), Back to the Future (1985), Legends of the Fall (1994), Wild Wild West (1999), The Patriot (2000), Transformers (2007), Avatar (2009), and Love & Other Drugs (2010). In 2023, she received the Costume Designers Guild Career Achievement Award.

She has also worked as Assistant costume designer in Shakespeare in Love (1998) and The Young Victoria (2009), as Set designer in Alouette, je te plumerai (1989), and Midsummer, Nat Horne Theatre, New York City, (1990).

== Filmography ==
- Avatar: Fire and Ash (2025)
- Avatar: The Way of Water (2022)
- Sicario: Day of the Soldado (2018)
- Rebel in the Rye (2017)
- 13 Hours: The Secret Soldiers of Benghazi (2016)
- Aloha (2015)
- Rock the Kasbah (2015)
- The Amazing Spider-Man 2 (2014)
- We Bought A Zoo (2011)
- Transformers: Dark of the Moon (2011)
- Love & Other Drugs (2010)
- Avatar (2009)
- Transformers: Revenge of the Fallen (2009)
- The Invention of Lying (2009)
- Get Smart (2008)
- Reign Over Me (2007)
- Seraphim Falls (2007)
- Transformers (2007)
- The Lost City (2005)
- The Island (2005)
- The Upside of Anger (2005)
- Bad Boys II (2003)
- The Hebrew Hammer (2003)
- Minority Report (2002)
- The Patriot (2000)
- Wild Wild West (1999)
- Titanic (1997)
- To Gillian on Her 37th Birthday (1996)
- Heat (1995)
- The Indian in the Cupboard (1995)
- Legends of the Fall (1994)
- Jack the Bear (1993)
- Sliver (1993)
- Hoffa (1992)
- The Turn of the Screw (1992)
- Defending Your Life (1991)
- Eve of Destruction (1991)
- Hear My Song (1991)
- Coupe de Ville (1990)
- When the Whales Came (1989)
- Moving (1988)
- Who's That Girl (1987)
- About Last Night... (1986)
- Armed and Dangerous (1986)
- Blue City (1986)
- Back to the Future (1985)
- Streets of Fire (1984)
- Never Cry Wolf (1983)
- Kiss My Grits (1983)
- Twilight Zone: The Movie (1983)
- E.T. the Extra-Terrestrial (1982)
- The Private Eyes (1980)
- Don't Answer the Phone (1979)
