= Michael Kaplan (costume designer) =

American costume designer

- Born: Philadelphia, Pennsylvania
- Occupation: Costume designer
- Years active: 1978– present
- Notable work: Blade Runner; Armageddon; Fight Club; Pearl Harbor; Mr. & Mrs. Smith; Burlesque; Star Trek franchise; Star Wars sequel trilogy
- Awards: BAFTA Award for Best Costume Design

Michael Kaplan is an American film costume designer. He is a co-recipient of the BAFTA Award for his work on Blade Runner. He is known for working on many famous Hollywood films including the Star Wars sequel trilogy. Kaplan has been working in the Hollywood film industry since the 1978 film Thank God It's Friday.

== Work ==
Kaplan won the British Academy of Film and Television Arts Award for Best Costume Design together with Charles Knode in 1983, for his costume design work on Blade Runner, the first theatrically-released film he had worked on as costume designer. He went on to become a nominee in the Costume Designers Guild Awards 1999, and the Costume Designers Guild Awards 2005 in the category of Excellence in Costume Design for Film - Contemporary, for his costume designs for Fight Club and Mr. & Mrs. Smith, respectively.

Besides Fight Club, Kaplan has worked on three other films for director David Fincher: Seven, The Game, and Panic Room. He also reunited with Blade Runner director Ridley Scott on Matchstick Men. He worked on Mission Impossible: Ghost Protocol, starring Tom Cruise. Kaplan's other credits include two films for Michael Bay, Armageddon and Pearl Harbor.

He also worked on Flashdance, Clue, Perfect, National Lampoon's Christmas Vacation, Malice, The Long Kiss Goodnight, Gigli, Miami Vice, I Am Legend starring Will Smith, J. J. Abrams' Star Trek and Star Trek Into Darkness, The Sorcerer's Apprentice for director Jon Turteltaub, and Burlesque, starring Christina Aguilera and Cher. His contribution to Burlesque resulted in a Costume Designers Guild Award nomination for "Excellence In Contemporary Film".

Kaplan reunited with Abrams for the first film in the Star Wars sequel trilogy, Star Wars: The Force Awakens, and returned to the franchise as costume designer for both Star Wars: The Last Jedi and Star Wars: The Rise of Skywalker.

== Filmography ==
Year	Title	Notes
1982	Blade Runner	with Charles Knode
1983	Flashdance	
1984	Against All Odds	
1984	Thief of Hearts	
1984	American Dreamer	
1985	Perfect	
1985	Clue	
1987	Tough Guys Don't Dance	
1988	Big Business	
1989	Cousins	
1989	National Lampoon's Christmas Vacation	
1989	Cat Chaser	
1991	Curly Sue	
1993	Malice	
1995	Seven	
1996	Diabolique	
1996	The Long Kiss Goodnight	
1997	The Game	
1998	Armageddon	
1999	Fight Club	
2000	Keeping the Faith	
2001	Pearl Harbor	
2002	Panic Room	
2002	Trapped	
2003	Gigli	
2003	Matchstick Men	
2005	Mr. & Mrs. Smith	
2006	Miami Vice	with Janty Yates
2007	Lucky You	
2007	I Am Legend	
2009	Star Trek	
2010	The Sorcerer's Apprentice	
2010	Burlesque	
2011	Mission: Impossible – Ghost Protocol	
2013	Star Trek Into Darkness	
2014	Winter's Tale	
2015	Star Wars: The Force Awakens	
2016	War Dogs	
2017	Star Wars: The Last Jedi	
2019	Star Wars: The Rise of Skywalker	
2023	65	
2026	At the Sea	
