= Michael Wilkinson (costume designer) =

Australian costume designer

- Born: 1 October 1970 (age 55); Sydney, New South Wales, Australia
- Occupation: costume designer
- Years active: 1994–present

Michael Wilkinson is an Australian costume designer known for his work with Zack Snyder and the DCEU. Wilkinson was nominated for an Academy Award for Best Costume Design for the 2013 film American Hustle.

== Selected filmography ==
=== Film ===
Year	Title	Director	Notes
1997	True Love and Chaos	Stavros Kazantzidis	
2000	Looking for Alibrandi	Kate Woods	
2001	When Strangers Appear	Scott Reynolds	
2003	Party Monster	Fenton Bailey; Randy Barbato	
2003	American Splendor	Shari Springer Berman; Robert Pulcini	
2003	Milwaukee, Minnesota	Allan Mindel	
2004	Garden State	Zach Braff	
2004	Imaginary Heroes	Dan Harris	
2005	Dark Water	Walter Salles	
2005	Sky High	Mike Mitchell	
2006	Friends with Money	Nicole Holofcener	
2006	Babel	Alejandro González Iñárritu	with Gabriela Diaque and Miwako Kobayashi
2006	300	Zack Snyder	
2007	The Nanny Diaries	Shari Springer Berman; Robert Pulcini	
2007	Rendition	Gavin Hood	
2009	Watchmen	Zack Snyder	
2009	Terminator Salvation	McG	
2010	Jonah Hex	Jimmy Hayward	
2010	Tron: Legacy	Joseph Kosinski	with Christine Bieselin Clark as co-costume designer
2011	Sucker Punch	Zack Snyder	
2011	The Twilight Saga: Breaking Dawn – Part 1	Bill Condon	
2012	Loom	Luke Scott	Short film
2012	The Twilight Saga: Breaking Dawn – Part 2	Bill Condon	
2013	Man of Steel	Zack Snyder	
2013	American Hustle	David O. Russell	
2014	Noah	Darren Aronofsky	
2015	Joy	David O. Russell	
2016	Batman v Superman: Dawn of Justice	Zack Snyder	
2017	The Current War	Alfonso Gomez-Rejon	
2017	Justice League	Zack Snyder	
2019	Aladdin	Guy Ritchie	
2019	Seberg	Benedict Andrews	
2019	The Gentlemen	Guy Ritchie	
2020	Jingle Jangle: A Christmas Journey	David E. Talbert	
2021	Zack Snyder's Justice League	Zack Snyder	Director's cut of Justice League

=== Television ===
Year	Title	Notes
2011	Luck	Episode: "Pilot"
2022–2025	Andor	24 episodes
2024	3 Body Problem	8 episodes
2025	Death by Lightning	4 episodes
