= Kym Barrett =

Australian costume designer

- Born: 11 August 1965 (age 60); Brisbane, Australia
- Education: National Institute of Dramatic Art; University of New England
- Occupation: Costume designer

Kym Barrett (born 11 August 1965) is an Australian costume designer of Hollywood films. She is a regular collaborator with The Wachowskis and was the costume designer of their films The Matrix trilogy, Speed Racer, Cloud Atlas and Jupiter Ascending.

Kym Barrett started her career working in theatre for eight years before she began working in film. She has also designed costumes for Cirque du Soleil. Barrett designed freshly imagined period costumes for the Metropolitan Opera's 2013 production of The Tempest. In September 2013, she stepped down from her role as costume designer for the opening ceremony of the 2014 Winter Olympic Games in Sochi, Russia.

== Filmography ==
- Romeo + Juliet (1996)
- Zero Effect (1998)
- The Matrix (1999)
- Three Kings (1999)
- Titan A.E. (2000)
- Red Planet (2000)
- From Hell (2001)
- Final Flight of the Osiris (2003)
- The Matrix Reloaded (2003)
- The Matrix Revolutions (2003)
- Gothika (2003)
- Monster-in-Law (2005)
- Rumor Has It… (2005)
- The Virgin of Juarez (2006)
- Eragon (2006)
- The Children of Huang Shi (2008)
- Speed Racer (2008)
- The Green Hornet (2011)
- The Amazing Spider-Man (2012)
- Cloud Atlas (2012)
- Jupiter Ascending (2015)
- American Made (2017)
- Aquaman (2018)
- Us (2019)
- Charlie's Angels (2019)
- Shang-Chi and the Legend of the Ten Rings (2021)
- Three Thousand Years of Longing (2022)
