= Costume Designers Guild Award for Excellence in Contemporary Film =

Annual CDG film award

The Costume Designers Guild Award for Excellence in Contemporary Film is one of the annual awards given by the Costume Designers Guild.

In 1998, the Guild introduced a single award category titled Excellence in Film, in which all films competed regardless of genre. Among the inaugural nominees, three were period dramas, while two, including the winner, Pleasantville, were fantasy films. Beginning with the 1999 ceremony, the Guild divided the award into two categories: Excellence in Contemporary Film and Excellence in Period/Fantasy Film.

== Winners and nominees ==
=== 1990s ===
Year	Film	Costume Designer(s)
1999	American Beauty	Julie Weiss
1999	Cookie's Fortune	Dona Granata
1999	Eyes Wide Shut	Marit Allen
1999	Fight Club	Michael Kaplan

=== 2000s ===
Year	Film	Costume Designer(s)
2000	Erin Brockovich	Jeffrey Kurland
2000	Charlie's Angels	Joseph G. Aulisi
2000	High Fidelity	Laura Bauer
2000	Traffic	Louise Frogley
2000	X-Men	Louise Mingenbach
2001	The Royal Tenenbaums	Karen Patch
2001	Legally Blonde	Sophie De Rakoff Carbonell
2001	Mulholland Drive	Amy Stofsky
2001	Ocean's Eleven	Jeffrey Kurland
2002	About Schmidt	Wendy Chuck
2002	About a Boy	Joanna Johnston
2002	Igby Goes Down	Sarah Edwards
2002	Unfaithful	Ellen Mirojnick
2002	White Oleander	Susie DeSanto
2003	A Mighty Wind	Durinda Wood
2003	Charlie's Angels: Full Throttle	Joseph G. Aulisi
2003	Kill Bill: Volume 1	Catherine Marie Thomas
2003	Legally Blonde 2: Red, White & Blonde	Sophie De Rakoff Carbonell
2004	The Life Aquatic with Steve Zissou	Milena Canonero
2004	Alfie	Beatrix Aruna Pasztor
2004	Eternal Sunshine of the Spotless Mind	Melissa Toth
2004	Kill Bill: Volume 2	Catherine Marie Thomas
2004	Ocean's Twelve	Milena Canonero
2005	Transamerica	Danny Glicker
2005	Hustle & Flow	Paul A. Simmons Jr.
2005	Mr. & Mrs. Smith	Michael Kaplan
2005	Shopgirl	Nancy Steiner
2005	Syriana	Louise Frogley
2006	The Queen	Consolata Boyle
2006	Babel	Michael Wilkinson, Gabriela Diaque and Miwako Kobayashi
2006	Casino Royale	Lindy Hemming
2006	The Devil Wears Prada	Patricia Field
2006	Little Miss Sunshine	Nancy Steiner
2007	Blades of Glory	Julie Weiss
2007	The Diving Bell and the Butterfly	Olivier Bériot
2007	Into the Wild	Mary Claire Hannan
2007	Juno	Monique Prudhomme
2007	Ocean's Thirteen	Louise Frogley
2008	Slumdog Millionaire	Suttirat Anne Larlarb
2008	Iron Man	Laura Jean Shannon and Rebecca Gregg
2008	Mamma Mia!	Ann Roth
2008	Sex and the City	Patricia Field
2008	The Wrestler	Amy Westcott
2009	Crazy Heart	Doug Hall
2009	(500) Days of Summer	Hope Hanafin
2009	Brüno	Jason Alper
2009	Precious	Marina Draghici
2009	Up in the Air	Danny Glicker

=== 2010s ===
Year	Film	Costume Designer(s)
2010	Black Swan	Amy Westcott
2010	Burlesque	Michael Kaplan
2010	Inception	Jeffrey Kurland
2010	The Social Network	Jacqueline West
2010	Wall Street: Money Never Sleeps	Ellen Mirojnick
2011	The Girl with the Dragon Tattoo	Trish Summerville
2011	Bridesmaids	Leesa Evans and Christine Wada
2011	The Descendants	Wendy Chuck
2011	Drive	Erin Benach
2011	Melancholia	Manon Rasmussen
2012	Skyfall	Jany Temime
2012	Beasts of the Southern Wild	Stephani Lewis
2012	The Best Exotic Marigold Hotel	Louise Stjernsward
2012	Silver Linings Playbook	Mark Bridges
2012	Zero Dark Thirty	George L. Little
2013	Blue Jasmine	Suzy Benzinger
2013	Her	Casey Storm
2013	Nebraska	Wendy Chuck
2013	Philomena	Consolata Boyle
2013	The Secret Life of Walter Mitty	Sarah Edwards
2014	Birdman or (The Unexpected Virtue of Ignorance)	Albert Wolsky
2014	Boyhood	Kari Perkins
2014	Gone Girl	Trish Summerville
2014	Interstellar	Mary Zophres
2014	Wild	Melissa Bruning
2015	Beasts of No Nation	Jenny Eagan
2015	Joy	Michael Wilkinson
2015	Kingsman: The Secret Service	Arianne Phillips
2015	The Martian	Janty Yates
2015	Youth	Carlo Poggioli
2016	La La Land	Mary Zophres
2016	Absolutely Fabulous: The Movie	Rebecca Hale
2016	Captain Fantastic	Courtney Hoffman
2016	Lion	Cappi Ireland
2016	Nocturnal Animals	Arianne Phillips
2017	I, Tonya	Jennifer Johnson
2017	Get Out	Nadine Haders
2017	Kingsman: The Golden Circle	Arianne Phillips
2017	Lady Bird	April Napier
2017	Three Billboards Outside Ebbing, Missouri	Melissa Toth
2018	Crazy Rich Asians	Mary E. Vogt
2018	Mamma Mia! Here We Go Again	Michele Clapton
2018	Ocean's 8	Sarah Edwards
2018	Red Sparrow	Trish Summerville
2018	A Star Is Born	Erin Benach
2018	Widows	Jenny Eagan
2019	Knives Out	Jenny Eagan
2019	A Beautiful Day in the Neighborhood	Arjun Bhasin
2019	Hustlers	Mitchell Travers
2019	The Laundromat	Ellen Mirojnick
2019	Queen & Slim	Shiona Turini

=== 2020s ===
Year	Film	Costume Designer(s)
2020	Promising Young Woman	Nancy Steiner
2020	Barb and Star Go to Vista Del Mar	Trayce Gigi Field
2020	Birds of Prey (and the Fantabulous Emancipation of One Harley Quinn)	Erin Benach
2020	Da 5 Bloods	Donna Berwick
2020	The Prom	Lou Eyrich
2021	Coming 2 America	Ruth E. Carter
2021	Don't Look Up	Susan Matheson
2021	In the Heights	Mitchell Travers
2021	No Time to Die	Suttirat Anne Larlarb
2021	Zola	Derica Cole Washington
2022	Glass Onion: A Knives Out Mystery	Jenny Eagan
2022	Nope	Alex Bovaird
2022	Tár	Bina Daigeler
2022	Top Gun: Maverick	Marlene Stewart
2022	Women Talking	Quita Alfred
2023	Saltburn	Sophie Canale
2023	American Fiction	Rudy Nance
2023	May December	April Napier
2023	Nyad	Kelli Jones
2023	Renfield	Lisa Lovaas
2024	Conclave	Lisy Christl
2024	Challengers	Jonathan Anderson
2024	Emilia Pérez	Virginie Montel
2024	The Fall Guy	Sarah Evelyn
2024	The Substance	Emmanuelle Youchnovski
2025	One Battle After Another	Colleen Atwood
2025	Bugonia	Jennifer Johnson
2025	F1 the Movie	Julian Day
2025	Wake Up Dead Man: A Knives Out Mystery	Jenny Eagan
2025	Weapons	Trish Summerville

== Designers with multiple wins ==
3 wins

- Jenny Eagan

2 wins

- Julie Weiss

== Designers with multiple nominations ==
5 nominations

- Jenny Eagan

4 nominations

- Trish Summerville

3 nominations

- Erin Benach
- Wendy Chuck
- Sarah Edwards
- Louise Frogley
- Michael Kaplan
- Jeffrey Kurland
- Ellen Mirojnick
- Arianne Phillips
- Nancy Steiner

2 nominations

- Joseph G. Aulisi
- Consolata Boyle
- Milena Canonero
- Sophie De Rakoff
- Patricia Field
- Danny Glicker
- Jennifer Johnson
- Suttirat Anne Larlarb
- April Napier
- Catherine Marie Thomas
- Melissa Toth
- Mitchell Travers
- Julie Weiss
- Amy Westcott
- Michael Wilkinson
- Mary Zophres
