= Satellite Award for Best Costume Design =

Award from the International Press Academy

- Awarded for: Best Costume Design
- Country: United States
- Presented by: International Press Academy
- First award: 1996
- Currently held by: Paul Tazewell – Wicked (2024)
- Website: www.pressacademy.com

The Satellite Award for Best Costume Design is one of the annual Satellite Awards given by the International Press Academy.

== Winners and nominees ==
=== 1990s ===
Year	Film	Recipient
1996	Evita	Penny Rose
1996	Hamlet	Alexandra Byrne
1996	Moll Flanders	Consolata Boyle
1996	The Portrait of a Lady	Janet Patterson
1996	Ridicule	Christian Gasc
1997	Titanic	Deborah Lynn Scott
1997	Amistad	Ruth E. Carter
1997	Beaumarchais the Scoundrel (Beaumarchais l'insolent)	Sylvie de Segonzac
1997	Mrs Brown	Deirdre Clancy
1997	The Wings of the Dove	Sandy Powell
1998	Elizabeth	Alexandra Byrne
1998	Beloved	Colleen Atwood
1998	Ever After	Jenny Beavan
1998	Pleasantville	Judianna Makovsky
1998	Shakespeare in Love	Sandy Powell
1999	Sleepy Hollow	Colleen Atwood
1999	Anna and the King	Jenny Beavan
1999	The Emperor and the Assassin (Jing Ke ci Qin Wang)	Mo Xiaomin
1999	An Ideal Husband	Caroline Harris
1999	The Red Violin (Le Violon Rouge)	Renée April
1999	Titus	Milena Canonero

=== 2000s ===
Year	Film	Recipient(s)
2000	How the Grinch Stole Christmas	Rita Ryack
2000	Crouching Tiger, Hidden Dragon (Wo hu cang long)	Tim Yip
2000	Gladiator	Janty Yates
2000	The House of Mirth	Monica Howe
2000	The Patriot	Deborah Lynn Scott
2001	Moulin Rouge!	Catherine Martin and Angus Strathie
2001	The Affair of the Necklace	Milena Canonero
2001	From Hell	Kym Barrett
2001	The Lord of the Rings: The Fellowship of the Ring	Ngila Dickson and Richard Taylor
2001	Planet of the Apes	Colleen Atwood
2002	Frida	Julie Weiss
2002	Austin Powers in Goldmember	Deena Appel
2002	Gangs of New York	Sandy Powell
2002	Road to Perdition	Albert Wolsky
2002	Star Wars: Episode II – Attack of the Clones	Trisha Biggar
2003	The Last Samurai	Ngila Dickson
2003	The Company	Susan Kaufmann
2003	The Lord of the Rings: The Return of the King	Ngila Dickson and Richard Taylor
2003	Master and Commander: The Far Side of the World	Wendy Stites
2003	Pirates of the Caribbean: The Curse of the Black Pearl	Penny Rose
2003	Seabiscuit	Judianna Makovsky
2004	Vanity Fair	Beatrix Aruna Pasztor
2004	The Aviator	Sandy Powell
2004	De-Lovely	Janty Yates
2004	House of Flying Daggers (Shi mian mai fu)	Emi Wada
2004	The Phantom of the Opera	Alexandra Byrne
2004	Sky Captain and the World of Tomorrow	Stella McCartney
2005	Pride & Prejudice	Jacqueline Durran
2005	Harry Potter and the Goblet of Fire	Jany Temime
2005	Kingdom of Heaven	Janty Yates
2005	Memoirs of a Geisha	Colleen Atwood
2005	Modigliani	Pam Downe
2005	The White Countess	John Bright
2006	The Devil Wears Prada	Patricia Field
2006	The Black Dahlia	Jenny Beavan
2006	Curse of the Golden Flower (Man cheng jin dai huang jin jia)	Yee Chung-man
2006	Dreamgirls	Sharen Davis
2006	Marie Antoinette	Milena Canonero
2007	Elizabeth: The Golden Age	Alexandra Byrne
2007	Amazing Grace	Jenny Beavan
2007	Atonement	Jacqueline Durran
2007	Goya's Ghosts	Yvonne Blake
2007	Hairspray	Rita Ryack
2007	La Vie en Rose (La Môme)	Marit Allen
2008	The Duchess	Michael O'Connor
2008	Australia	Catherine Martin
2008	Brideshead Revisited	Eimer Ní Mhaoldomhnaigh
2008	City of Ember	Ruth Myers
2008	The Curious Case of Benjamin Button	Jacqueline West
2008	Sex and the City	Patricia Field
2009	The Imaginarium of Doctor Parnassus	Monique Prudhomme
2009	Chéri	Consolata Boyle
2009	Nine	Colleen Atwood
2009	Red Cliff (Chi bi)	Tim Yip
2009	The Young Victoria	Sandy Powell

=== 2010s ===
Year	Film	Recipient(s)
2010	Alice in Wonderland	Colleen Atwood
2010	Black Swan	Amy Westcott
2010	Eat Pray Love	Michael Dennison
2010	The King's Speech	Jenny Beavan
2010	Robin Hood	Janty Yates
2011	Water for Elephants	Jacqueline West
2011	Anonymous	Lisy Christl
2011	The Artist	Mark Bridges
2011	Faust	Lidiya Kryukova
2011	Jane Eyre	Michael O'Connor
2011	Mysteries of Lisbon (Mistérios de Lisboa)	Isabel Branco
2012	A Royal Affair (En kongelig affære)	Manon Rasmussen
2012	Anna Karenina	Jacqueline Durran
2012	Cloud Atlas	Kym Barrett and Pierre-Yves Gayraud
2012	Farewell, My Queen (Les Adieux à la reine)	Christian Gasc and Valérie Ranchoux
2012	Les Misérables	Paco Delgado
2012	Snow White and the Huntsman	Colleen Atwood
2013	The Invisible Woman	Michael O'Connor
2013	12 Years a Slave	Patricia Norris
2013	The Great Gatsby	Catherine Martin
2013	Oz the Great and Powerful	Gary Jones
2013	Rush	Julian Day
2013	Saving Mr. Banks	Daniel Orlandi
2014	The Grand Budapest Hotel	Milena Canonero
2014	Belle	Anushia Nieradzik
2014	Into the Woods	Colleen Atwood
2014	Maleficent	Anna B. Sheppard
2014	Noah	Michael Wilkinson
2014	Saint Laurent	Anais Romand
2015	The Assassin (Cìkè Niè Yǐnniáng)	Wen-Ying Huang
2015	Cinderella	Sandy Powell
2015	The Danish Girl	Paco Delgado
2015	Far from the Madding Crowd	Janet Patterson
2015	Macbeth	Jacqueline Durran
2015	The Throne (Sado)	Shim Hyun-seob
2016	Jackie	Madeline Fontaine
2016	Alice Through the Looking Glass	Colleen Atwood
2016	Captain Fantastic	Courtney Hoffman
2016	Doctor Strange	Alexandra Byrne
2016	La La Land	Mary Zophres
2016	Love & Friendship	Eimer Ní Mhaoldomhnaigh
2017	Phantom Thread	Mark Bridges
2017	Beauty and the Beast	Jacqueline Durran
2017	The Beguiled	Stacey Battat
2017	Dunkirk	Jeffrey Kurland
2017	Murder on the Orient Express	Alexandra Byrne
2017	Victoria & Abdul	Consolata Boyle
2018	The Favourite	Sandy Powell
2018	Black Panther	Ruth E. Carter
2018	Colette	Andrea Flesch
2018	Fantastic Beasts: The Crimes of Grindelwald	Colleen Atwood
2018	Mary Queen of Scots	Alexandra Byrne
2018	A Star Is Born	Erin Benach
2019	Dolemite Is My Name	Ruth E. Carter
2019	Downton Abbey	Anna Mary Scott Robbins
2019	Joker	Mark Bridges
2019	Judy	Jany Temime
2019	Rocketman	Julian Day
2019	The Two Popes	Luca Canfora

=== 2020s ===
Year	Film	Recipient(s)
2020	The Personal History of David Copperfield	Suzie Harman and Robert Worley
2020	Emma	Alexandra Byrne
2020	Ma Rainey's Black Bottom	Ann Roth
2020	Mank	Trish Summerville
2020	Mulan	Bina Daigeler
2020	One Night in Miami...	Francine Jamison-Tanchuck
2021	Cyrano	Massimo Cantini Parrini
2021	Belfast	Charlotte Walter
2021	Coming 2 America	Ruth E. Carter
2021	Dune	Jacqueline West and Robert Morgan
2021	The Power of the Dog	Kirsty Cameron
2021	Spencer	Jacqueline Durran
2022	Babylon	Mary Zophres
2022	Black Panther: Wakanda Forever	Ruth E. Carter
2022	Elvis	Catherine Martin
2022	Empire of Light	Alexandra Byrne
2022	Living	Sandy Powell
2022	The Woman King	Gersha Phillips
2023	Napoleon	David Crossman and Janty Yates
2023	Barbie	Jacqueline Durran
2023	The Color Purple	Francine Jamison-Tanchuck
2023	Killers of the Flower Moon	Jacqueline West
2023	Oppenheimer	Ellen Mirojnick
2023	Poor Things	Holly Waddington
2024	Wicked	Paul Tazewell
2024	Blitz	Jacqueline Durran
2024	Dune: Part Two	Jacqueline West
2024	Gladiator II	Janty Yates and David Crossman
2024	Maria	Massimo Cantini Parrini
2024	Nosferatu	Linda Muir
