= Primetime Emmy Award for Outstanding Costumes for a Miniseries, Movie, or Special =

Emmy award

The Primetime Emmy Award for Outstanding Costumes for a Miniseries, Movie, or Special is a retired award that was presented as part of the Primetime Emmy Awards. Until 1999, the category was divided to award costume designers and costume supervisors separately.

In 2015, this category and Outstanding Costumes for a Series were rearranged as Outstanding Period and Outstanding Contemporary Costumes.

== Winners and nominations ==
=== 1960s ===
Outstanding Individual Achievement in the Visual Arts

Year	Program	Episode	Nominees	Network
1969
1969	The Carol Burnett Show		Bob Mackie	CBS
1969	Carol Channing and Pearl Bailey on Broadway		Ray Aghayan	ABC

=== 1970s ===
Outstanding Achievement in Costume Design

Year	Program	Episode	Nominees	Network
1970
1970	Diana Ross and the Supremes and The Temptations on Broadway		Bob Mackie	NBC
1970	The Don Adams Special: Hooray for Hollywood		George R. Whittaker	CBS
1970	Rowan & Martin's Laugh-In		Michael Travis	NBC
1971
1971	Hamlet (Hallmark Hall of Fame)		Martin Baugh, David Walker	NBC
1971	The Andy Williams Show	"Christmas Show"	Ret Turner	NBC
1971	Bing Crosby — Cooling It		Robert Carlton	NBC
1971	They've Killed President Lincoln!		Patricia Segnan	NBC
1972
1972	Elizabeth R	"The Lion's Club"	Elizabeth Waller	PBS
1972	The Fabulous Fordies		Ret Turner	NBC
1972	The Sonny & Cher Comedy Hour	"Art Carney"	Bob Mackie, Ret Turner	CBS
1973
1973	The Julie Andrews Hour		Jack Bear	ABC
1973	Columbo	"Dagger of the Mind"	Grady Hunt	NBC
1973	Cortez and Montezuma: Appointment with Destiny		Christina Von Humboldt	CBS
1973	Dr. Jekyll and Mr. Hyde		Emma Porteous	NBC
1973	Much Ado About Nothing		Theoni V. Aldredge	CBS
1974
1974	The Autobiography of Miss Jane Pittman		Sandy Stewart, Bruce Walkup	CBS
1974	The New Treasure Hunt		Barbara Murphy	Syndicated
1974	The Snoop Sisters		Grady Hunt	NBC
1974	The Sonny & Cher Comedy Hour	"The Sonny and Cher Years"	Bob Mackie, Ret Turner	CBS
1974	War and Peace		Charles Knode	PBS
1975
1975	The Legend of Lizzie Borden		Guy Verhille	ABC
1975	Love Among the Ruins		Margaret Furse	ABC
1975	Cher	"Bette Midler, Flip Wilson and Elton John"	Bob Mackie	CBS
1975	Queen of the Stardust Ballroom		Bruce Walkup	CBS
1975	The Sonny Comedy Revue	"McLean Stevenson and Joey Heatherton"	Ret Turner	ABC

Outstanding Achievement in Costume Design for a Drama Special

Year	Program	Episode	Nominees	Network
1976
1976	Eleanor and Franklin		Joe I. Tompkins	ABC
1976	The Lindbergh Kidnapping Case		Bob Christenson, Denita Cavett	NBC
1977
1977	Eleanor and Franklin: The White House Years		Joe I. Tompkins	ABC
1977	Beauty and the Beast		Albert Wolsky	NBC
1977	The Man in the Iron Mask		Olga Lehmann	NBC
1978
1978	Outstanding Costume Design for a Limited Series or a Special			
1978	Actor		Noel Taylor	PBS
1978	The Bastard		Jean-Pierre Dorleac	Syndicated
1978	The Dark Secret of Harvest Home		Bill Jobe	NBC
1978	The Four Feathers		Olga Lehmann	NBC
1978	Ziegfeld: The Man and His Women		Grady Hunt	NBC
1978	Special Classification of Outstanding Individual Achievement (Note: As a juried award, nominees had to garner 50% approval to win the award.)			
1978	Dance in America: Romeo and Juliet (Great Performances)		William Pitkin	PBS
1979
1979	Edward the King	"King at Last"	Ann Hollowood, Sue Le Cash, Christine Wilson	Syndicated
1979	Cher... and Other Fantasies		Bob Mackie, Ret Turner	NBC
1979	The Corn Is Green		David Walker	CBS
1979	The John Davidson Christmas Show		Warden Neil	ABC

=== 1980s ===
Year	Program	Episode	Nominees	Network
1980
1980	Outstanding Costume Design for a Limited Series or a Special			
1980	The Scarlett O'Hara War		William Travilla	NBC
1980	Ann-Margret: Hollywood Movie Girls		Bob Mackie	ABC
1980	The Beatrice Arthur Special		Ret Turner	CBS
1980	The Carpenters: Music, Music, Music		Bill Belew	ABC
1980	The Dream Merchants		Grady Hunt	Syndicated
1980	Outstanding Individual Achievement - Special Class (Note: As a juried award, nominees had to garner 50% approval to win the award. The nominees did not meet the benchmark and no award was given.)			
1980	The Dream Merchants		Clifford L. Chally, Pat Zinn	Syndicated
1981
1981	Outstanding Costume Design for a Limited Series or a Special			
1981	The Tempest Live with the San Francisco Ballet (Great Performances)		Willa Kim	PBS
1981	Evita Peron		William Travilla	NBC
1981	The Jayne Mansfield Story		Warden Neil	CBS
1981	Peter and Paul		Vittorio Nino Novarese	CBS
1981	A Tale of Two Cities		Olga Lehmann	CBS
1981	Outstanding Individual Achievement - Special Class (Note: As a juried award, nominees had to garner 50% approval to win the award. The nominees did not meet the benchmark and no award was given.)			
1981	Crazy Times		Harry Curtis, Adrianne Levesque	ABC
1981	The Diary of Anne Frank		Rita Bennett, Bill Blackburn	NBC
1981	East of Eden	"Part 1"	Robert Magahay, Judy Truchan	ABC
1982
1982	Outstanding Costume Design for a Limited Series or a Special			
1982	The Letter		Donald Brooks	ABC
1982	Eleanor, First Lady of the World		Noel Taylor	CBS
1982	The Elephant Man		Julie Weiss	ABC
1982	Jacqueline Bouvier Kennedy		William Travilla	ABC
1982	Mae West		Jean-Pierre Dorleac	ABC
1982	Outstanding Individual Achievement - Special Class (Note: As a juried award, nominees had to garner 50% approval to win the award. The nominees did not meet the benchmark and no award was given.)			
1982	Agatha Christie's Murder Is Easy		Gloria Barnes, Elsa Fennell, Colin Wilson	CBS
1983
1983	The Scarlet Pimpernel		Phyllis Dalton	CBS
1983	The 55th Annual Academy Awards		Ray Aghayan	ABC
1983	Happy Birthday, Bob!		Warden Neil	NBC
1983	Little Gloria... Happy at Last		Julie Weiss	NBC
1983	The Thorn Birds		William Travilla	ABC
1984
1984	The Dollmaker		Julie Weiss	ABC
1984	The Master of Ballantrae		Olga Lehmann	CBS
1984	Nancy Astor	"Part 3"	Joyce Mortlock	PBS
1984	A Streetcar Named Desire		William Travilla	ABC
1985
1985	Outstanding Costume Design for a Limited Series or a Special			
1985	Ellis Island	"Part 1"	Barbara Lane	CBS
1985	Christopher Columbus		Maria De Matteis, Enrico Luzzi	CBS
1985	Evergreen	"Part 1"	Julie Weiss	NBC
1985	The Jewel in the Crown	"Crossing the River"	Esther Dean, Diane Holmes	PBS
1985	Malice in Wonderland		Nolan Miller, Mina Mittelman	CBS
1985	Outstanding Achievement in Costuming			
1985	Wallenberg: A Hero's Story		Thomas Welsh, Bob E. Horn, Marko Cerovac	NBC
1985	The Execution		Mina Mittelman, James Kessler	NBC
1985	The Jesse Owens Story		Thomas Welsh, Bob E. Horn, Marjorie K. Chan	OPT
1985	Scarecrow and Mrs. King	"Ship of Spies"	Andrea E. Weaver, James Lapidus	CBS
1986
1986	Outstanding Achievement in Costume Design for a Miniseries or a Special			
1986	Peter the Great	"Part 1"	Ella Maklakova, Sibylle Ulsamer	NBC
1986	Death of a Salesman		Ruth Morley	CBS
1986	Lord Mountbatten: The Last Viceroy	"Part 1"	Jenny Beavan	PBS
1986	North and South, Book II	"Part 1"	Robert Fletcher	ABC
1986	Roanoak	"Part 1"	Ann Roth, Richard Shissler, Neil Spisak	PBS
1986	Outstanding Achievement in Costuming for a Miniseries or a Special			
1986	North and South	"Part 4"	Joie Hutchinson, Vicki Sánchez, Pat McGrath	ABC
1986	Blood & Orchids	"Part 2"	Louise Clark, Patrick R. Norris	CBS
1986	Dallas: The Early Years		Winnie D. Brown, Daniel J. Lester, Joan Thomas, Janet Lucas Lawler	CBS
1986	Dress Gray	"Part 2"	Shari Feldman, Lucille Cusolito, Pat McGrath, Buck Skelton, Umberto Savoia	NBC
1987
1987	Outstanding Achievement in Costume Design for a Miniseries or a Special			
1987	Anastasia: The Mystery of Anna	"Part 1"	Jane Robinson	NBC
1987	Casanova		Yvonne Blake	ABC
1987	Fresno	"Part 1"	Bob Mackie	CBS
1987	Nutcracker: Money, Madness and Murder	"Part 1"	Theoni V. Aldredge	NBC
1987	The Two Mrs. Grenvilles	"Part 1"	Nolan Miller, Donald Brooks, Sue Yelland	NBC
1987	Outstanding Achievement in Costuming for a Miniseries or Special			
1987	Independence		Frances Harrison Hays	NBC
1987	The Betty Ford Story		Dodie Shepard	ABC
1987	Murder in Three Acts		Mina Mittelman	CBS
1988
1988	Outstanding Achievement in Costume Design for a Miniseries or a Special			
1988	Poor Little Rich Girl: The Barbara Hutton Story		Jane Robinson	NBC
1988	Lincoln		Joseph G. Aulisi, George L. Little	NBC
1988	Napoleon and Josephine: A Love Story	"Part 3"	Michel Fresnay	ABC
1988	The Woman He Loved		Robin Fraser-Paye	CBS
1988	Outstanding Achievement in Costuming for a Miniseries or Special			
1988	Shakedown on the Sunset Strip		Eddie Marks, Deborah Hopper, Radford Polinsky	CBS
1988	American Film Institute Comedy Special		Len Marcus	NBC
1988	What Price Victory		Dodie Shepard, Robert Iannaccone	ABC
1989
1989	Outstanding Achievement in Costume Design for a Miniseries or a Special			
1989	Lonesome Dove	"On the Trail"	Van Broughton Ramsey	CBS
1989	Around the World in 80 Days	"Part 1"	Emma Porteous	NBC
1989	My Name Is Bill W.		April Ferry	ABC
1989	Outstanding Achievement in Costuming for a Miniseries or Special			
1989	Pancho Barnes		Paula Lynn Kaatz, Andrea E. Weaver, Janet Lucas Lawler, Stephen M. Chudej	CBS
1989	War and Remembrance	"Part 3"	Bill Flores, Llandys Williams, Barbara Lane, James 'Mike' Balker	ABC
1989	A Friendship in Vienna		Mária Horányi	Disney
1989	Unconquered		Frances Harrison Hays	ABC

=== 1990s ===
Year	Program	Episode	Nominees	Network
1990
1990	The Kennedys of Massachusetts	"Part 1"	Shelley Komarov	ABC
1990	Great Expectations	"Part 2"	Tiny Nicholls, Joyce Stoneman	Disney
1990	The Phantom of the Opera	"Part 1"	Jacqueline Moreau	NBC
1991
1991	Outstanding Achievement in Costume Design for a Miniseries or a Special			
1991	The Josephine Baker Story		Maria Hruby, Györgyi Vidák	HBO
1991	Ironclads		Noel Taylor	TNT
1991	Lucy & Desi: Before the Laughter		May Routh	CBS
1991	Sarah, Plain and Tall		Van Broughton Ramsey	CBS
1991	Young Catherine	"Part 2"	Larisa Konnikova	TNT
1991	Outstanding Achievement in Costuming for a Miniseries or a Special			
1991	Son of the Morning Star	"Part 2"	Michael T. Boyd, Cathy Smith, Bud Clark	ABC
1991	Jackie Collins' Lucky/Chances	"Part 1"	Buffy Snyder, Jane Janiger, Michelle Kurpaska	NBC
1992
1992	Outstanding Achievement in Costume Design for a Miniseries or a Special			
1992	Young Indiana Jones and the Curse of the Jackal		Charlotte Holdich	ABC
1992	The Gambler Returns: The Luck of the Draw	"Part 2"	Robert Turturice	NBC
1992	I'll Fly Away	"Pilot"	Mina Mittelman	NBC
1992	Stompin' at the Savoy		Marilyn Matthews	CBS
1992	A Woman Named Jackie		Shelley Komarov	NBC
1992	Outstanding Achievement in Costuming for a Miniseries or a Special			
1992	Babe Ruth		Darryl Levine, Molly Harris Campbell, Bridget Ostersehlte	NBC
1992	Homefront	"Pilot"	Chic Gennarelli, Lyn Paolo, Nanrose Buchman	ABC
1993
1993	Outstanding Achievement in Costume Design for a Miniseries or a Special			
1993	Sinatra	"Part 1"	Shelley Komarov	CBS
1993	Alex Haley's Queen	"Part 1"	Helen P. Butler	CBS
1993	Citizen Cohn		Jill M. Ohanneson	HBO
1993	The House of Eliott	"Part 12"	Joan Wadge	A&E
1993	Mrs. 'Arris Goes to Paris		Jane Robinson	CBS
1993	Outstanding Achievement in Costuming for a Miniseries or a Special (Note: As a juried award, nominees had to garner 50% approval to win the award. The nominee did not meet the benchmark and no award was given.)			
1993	Danielle Steel's Heartbeat		Jim Lapidus, Rachael Stanley	NBC
1994
1994	Outstanding Achievement in Costume Design for a Miniseries or a Special			
1994	Oldest Living Confederate Widow Tells All	"Part 1"	Van Broughton Ramsey	CBS
1994	Abraham	"Part 1"	Enrico Sabbatini	TNT
1994	Gypsy		Bob Mackie	CBS
1994	I'll Fly Away: Then and Now		Tom McKinley	PBS
1994	World War II: When Lions Roared	"Part 2"	Jennifer L. Parsons	NBC
1994	Outstanding Achievement in Costuming for a Miniseries or a Special			
1994	Zelda		Nicoletta Massone	TNT
1994	A Walton Thanksgiving Reunion		Doris Alaimo, Patrick R. Norris	CBS
1995
1995	Outstanding Achievement in Costume Design for a Miniseries or a Special			
1995	A Woman of Independent Means	"Part 1"	Julie Weiss	NBC
1995	Buffalo Girls		Van Broughton Ramsey	CBS
1995	In Search of Dr. Seuss		Merrily Murray-Walsh	TNT
1995	The Piano Lesson		Vicki Sanchez	CBS
1995	Scarlett	"Part 1"	Marit Allen	CBS
1995	Outstanding Achievement in Costuming for a Miniseries or a Special			
1995	Madonna: Innocence Lost		Lynne Mackay	Fox
1996
1996	Outstanding Costume Design for a Miniseries or a Special			
1996	Pride & Prejudice		Dinah Collin	A&E
1996	Andersonville		May Routh	TNT
1996	Gulliver's Travels		Shirley Ann Russell	NBC
1996	Lily Dale		Jean-Pierre Dorléac	Showtime
1996	Rasputin		Natasha Landau	HBO
1996	Outstanding Costuming for a Miniseries or a Special			
1996	The Christmas Box		Jean Rosone	CBS
1997
1997	Outstanding Costume Design for a Miniseries or a Special			
1997	Emma		Jenny Beavan	NBC
1997	The Inheritance		Mary Malin	CBS
1997	The Hunchback		John Bloomfield	TNT
1997	Mrs. Santa Claus		Bob Mackie	CBS
1997	Titanic		Joe I. Tompkins, Jori Woodman	CBS
1997	Outstanding Costuming for a Miniseries or a Special			
1997	Disney's The Hunchback of Notre Dame Festival of Fun Musical Spectacular		Andy Gordon	Disney
1998
1998	Outstanding Costume Design for a Miniseries or a Special			
1998	Merlin		Ann Hollowood	CBS
1998	Armistead Maupin's More Tales of the City	"Part 2"	Denis Sperdouklis	Showtime
1998	From the Earth to the Moon	"Le Voyage Dans La Lune"	Chrisi Karvonides-Dushenko	HBO
1998	Gia		Robert Turturice	HBO
1998	Snow White: A Tale of Terror		Marit Allen, Charles Knode	Showtime
1998	Outstanding Costuming for a Miniseries or a Special			
1998	The Pentagon Wars		Amy Stofsky	HBO
1999	Alice in Wonderland		Charles Knode	NBC
1999	Cleopatra	"Part 1"	Enrico Sabbatini	ABC
1999	Dash and Lilly		Nic Ede	A&E
1999	Horatio Hornblower	"The Wrong War"	John Mollo	A&E
1999	Joan of Arc	"Part 2"	John Hay	CBS

=== 2000s ===
Year	Program	Episode	Nominees	Network
2000	Introducing Dorothy Dandridge		Lucinda Campbell, Shelley Komarov	HBO
2000	Annie		Shay Cunliffe, Patricia McLaughlin	ABC
2000	Arabian Nights	"Part 2"	Giovanni Casalnuovo, Maurizio Millenotti	ABC
2000	Don Quixote		Graham Churchyard, Charles Knode, Robert Worley	TNT
2000	Geppetto		Marcy Grace Froehlich, Hope Hanafin	ABC
2001	Life with Judy Garland: Me and My Shadows	"Part 1"	Dona Granata, Anne Peiponen, Brian Russman	ABC
2001	David Copperfield	"Part 2"	Joan Bergin, Eimer Ni Mhaoldomhnaigh, Susan Scott	TNT
2001	Horatio Hornblower	"Mutiny"	John Mollo, Barbara Rutter	A&E
2001	The Last of the Blonde Bombshells		Fionna McCann, Shirley Nevin, Frances Tempest, Faith Thomas	HBO
2002	Victoria & Albert	"Part 1"	Zoe Porter, Maria Price	A&E
2002	Anne Rice's The Feast of All Saints	"Part 1"	Van Broughton Ramsey, Sheila Fitzpatrick, Jeannie Flynn, Cornelia Medak, Sonny Merritt, Jonathan Tamarkin	Showtime
2002	Dinotopia	"Part 1"	Charles Knode, Joe Kowalewski, Robert Worley	ABC
2002	The Gathering Storm		Jenny Beavan, Anna Kot, Clare Spragge	HBO
2002	James Dean		Yvonne Blake, Randy Gardell	TNT
2002	The Mists of Avalon	"Part 1"	Giovanni Casalnuovo, Carlo Poggioli, Lindsay Pugh	TNT
2003	Napoléon	"Part 2"	Pierre-Jean Larroque	A&E
2003	Hitler: The Rise of Evil	"Part 2"	Anette Czagany, Carola Raum, Maria Schicker, Jaroslava Vesela	CBS
2003	Meredith Willson's The Music Man		Joseph A. Porro, Karen Renaut	ABC
2003	My House in Umbria		Nicoletta Ercole, M. Erminia Melato, Rosa Palma	HBO
2003	The Roman Spring of Mrs. Stone		Dona Granata, Gill Howard	Showtime
2004	The Lion in Winter		Consolata Boyle, Rhona McGuirke, Magdalen Rubalcava	Showtime
2004	And Starring Pancho Villa as Himself		Eduardo Castro, Michael R. Chapman, Bárbara González Monsreal	HBO
2004	Angels in America	"Perestroika"	Donna Maloney, Michelle Matland, Ann Roth	HBO
2004	Horatio Hornblower	"Loyalty"	John Mollo, Barbara Rutter	A&E
2004	Iron Jawed Angels		Carl Curnutte, Caroline Harris, Eric Van Wagoner	HBO
2005	The Lost Prince	"Part 1"	Odile Dicks-Mireaux, Colin May	PBS
2005	The Conquest of America	"The Southwest"	Jeannine Wiest, Phil Wayne	History
2005	Elvis	"Part 1"	Eduardo Castro, Helen Monaghan	CBS
2005	The Life and Death of Peter Sellers		Charlotte Sewell, Jill Taylor	HBO
2005	Warm Springs		Hope Hanafin, Keith G. Lewis	HBO
2006	Elizabeth I	"Part 2"	Samantha Horn, Mike O'Neill	HBO
2006	Bleak House	"Part 1"	Andrea Galer, Charlotte Morris	PBS
2006	Into the West	"Hell on Wheels"	Michael T. Boyd, Joe McClosky	TNT
2006	Mrs. Harris		Elaine Ramires, Julie Weiss	HBO
2006	Once Upon A Mattress		Dawn Climie, Christopher Hargadon, Bob Mackie	ABC
2007	Jane Eyre	"Part 1"	Sally Crees, Andrea Galer	PBS
2007	Broken Trail	"Part 2"	Kathleen Morley, Wendy Partridge	AMC
2007	Bury My Heart at Wounded Knee		Jill Blackie, Mario Davignon, Micheline Rouillard	HBO
2007	Longford		James Keast, Sara Moore	HBO
2007	The Starter Wife	"Part 1"	Marion Boyce, Vanessa Loh, Debra McGuire	USA
2008	John Adams	"Reunion"	Amy Andrews, Clare Scragge, Donna Zakowska	HBO
2008	Bernard and Doris		Joseph G. Aulisi, Autumn Saville	HBO
2008	Comanche Moon	"Part 2"	Betsey Potter, Van Broughton Ramsey	CBS
2008	Cranford	"Part 1"	Jenny Beavan, Mark Ferguson	PBS
2008	Tin Man	"Part 1"	Sandra J. Blackie, Angus Strathie	Sci Fi
2009	Little Dorrit	"Part 3"	Barbara Kidd, Marion Weise	PBS
2009	Grey Gardens		Mickey Carleton, Catherine Marie Thomas	HBO
2009	House of Saddam	"Part 1"	Alexandra Caulfield, Lupt Utama	HBO
2009	Into the Storm		Consolata Boyle, Marion Weise	HBO
2009	The Librarian: Curse of the Judas Chalice		Jennifer Kamrath, Kim Martínez	TNT

=== 2010s ===
Year	Program	Episode	Nominees	Network
2010	Return to Cranford	"Part 2"	Alison Beard, Jenny Beavan	PBS
2010	Emma	"Part 2"	Rosalind Ebbutt, Amanda Keable	PBS
2010	Georgia O'Keeffe		Michael Dennison, Frances Vega	Lifetime
2010	The Pacific	"Part 3"	Ken Crouch, Penny Rose	HBO
2010	You Don't Know Jack		Rita Ryack, Maria Tortu	HBO
2011	Downton Abbey	"Episode One"	Susannah Buxton, Caroline McCal	PBS
2011	Cinema Verite		Suttirat Anne Larlarb, Joseph T. Mastrolia	HBO
2011	Mildred Pierce	"Part 2"	Ann Roth, Michelle Matland, Patrick Wiley	HBO
2011	Upstairs, Downstairs	"The Fledgling"	Amy Roberts, Giles Gale	PBS
2012	Great Expectations	"Part 2"	Yvonne Duckett, Annie Symons	PBS
2012	American Horror Story	"Halloween"	Conan Castro, Chrisi Karvonides	FX
2012	Hatfields & McCoys	"Part 2"	Adina Bucur, Karri Hutchinson	History
2012	Hemingway & Gellhorn		Adina Bucur, Ruth Myers	HBO
2012	Sherlock: A Scandal in Belgravia		Sarah Arthur, Ceri Walford	PBS
2012	Treasure Island	"Part 1"	Lorna Marie Mugan, Rhona McGuirke	Syfy
2013	Behind the Candelabra		Ellen Mirojnick, Robert Q. Matthews	HBO
2013	American Horror Story: Asylum	"Madness Ends"	Lou Eyrich, Marcy Lavender	FX
2013	The Girl		Diana Cilliers, Melissa Moritz	HBO
2013	Killing Lincoln		Amy Andrews Harrell, Renee Jones	Nat Geo
2013	Parade's End	"Episode 3"	Sheena Napier, Jenna McGranaghan	HBO
2013	Phil Spector		Debra McGuire, Lorraine Calvert	HBO
2014	American Horror Story: Coven	"Bitchcraft"	Lou Eyrich, Elizabeth Macey, Ken Van Duyne	FX
2014	House of Versace		Claire Nadon, Nicole Magny	Lifetime
2014	The Normal Heart		Daniel Orlandi, Gail A. Fitzgibbons, Hartsell Taylor, Maria Tortu	HBO
2014	Sherlock: His Last Vow		Sarah Arthur, Ceri Walford	PBS
2014	The White Queen	"The Price of Power"	Nic Ede, Raissa Hans, Elizabeth Healy	Starz
