= 3rd Costume Designers Guild Awards =

Award ceremony for film and television costuming in 2000

- Date: March 17, 2001
- Location: The Beverly Hills Hotel, Beverly Hills, California
- Country: United States
- Presented by: Costume Designers Guild
- Hosted by: Tim Curry

Highlights
- Excellence in Contemporary Film: Erin Brockovich – Jeffrey Kurland
- Excellence in Period/Fantasy Film: Dr. Seuss' How the Grinch Stole Christmas – Rita Ryack

The 3rd Costume Designers Guild Awards, given on March 17, 2001, honored the best costume designs in film and television for 2000. The nominees were announced on February 2, 2001.

== Winners and nominees ==
Winners are listed first and in bold.

=== Film ===
Excellence in Contemporary Film	Excellence in Period/Fantasy Film
**Erin Brockovich – Jeffrey Kurland**; Charlie's Angels – Joseph Aulisi; High Fidelity – Laura C. Bauer; Traffic – Louise Frogley; X-Men – Louise Mingenbach	**Dr. Seuss' How the Grinch Stole Christmas – Rita Ryack**; Almost Famous – Betsy Heimann; Chocolat – Renee Ehrlich Kalfus; Quills – Jacqueline West

=== Television ===
Excellence in Contemporary Television	Excellence in Period/Fantasy Television
**Sex and the City – Patricia Field**; Ally McBeal – Kathleen Detoro and Yana Syrkin; The West Wing – Lyn Paolo; Will & Grace – Lori Eskowitz-Carter	**Geppetto – Hope Hanafin**; Freaks and Geeks – Debra McGuire; Jackie Bouvier Kennedy Onassis – Carol Ramsey; That '70s Show – Melina Root

=== Special awards ===
==== Career Achievement Award ====
- Milena Canonero (film)
- Bill Hargate (television)

==== Distinguished Director Award ====
- Warren Beatty

==== Hall of Fame ====
- Jean Louis
