= Costume Designers Guild Awards =

Film and television costume design awards

- Current: 28th Costume Designers Guild Awards
- Awarded for: Excellence in costume design
- Country: United States
- Presented by: Costume Designers Guild
- First award: February 6, 1999; 27 years ago
- Website: costumedesignersguild.com

The Costume Designers Guild Awards are awards presented annually by the Costume Designers Guild (CDG) to recognize outstanding achievement in costume design for film, television, short form productions, and costume illustration.

== History ==
In 1999, the Costume Designers Guild (CDG) began giving out its own awards to honor outstanding achievements in costume design at a ceremony similar to that of the DGA, WGA, PGA, and SAG awards. The first CDG Awards presentation was held on February 6, 1999, at the Beverly Hills Hotel in Beverly Hills, California, by actress Anjelica Huston. Two competitive categories for excellence in film and television have been presented; Judianna Makovsky and Van Broughton Ramsey won for Pleasantville and The Tempest, respectively. Nevertheless, these categories were divided into various genres for all subsequent ceremonies. The inaugural career achievement award recipients were veteran designers Albert Wolsky and Bob Mackie. All winners and honorees were given the CDGA statuette, which is made of sterling silver and depicts a female figure draped in an amorphous swirl of fabric.

Through the years, the CDG Awards has expanded to include several competition categories that encompass film, television and commercials.

== Award categories ==
=== Film ===
  - Excellence in Contemporary Film: since 1999
  - Excellence in Period Film: since 2005
  - Excellence in Sci-Fi/Fantasy Film: since 2005

=== Television ===
  - Excellence in Contemporary Television: since 1999
  - Excellence in Period Television: since 2015
  - Excellence in Sci-Fi/Fantasy Television: since 2015
  - Excellence in Variety, Reality-Competition, and Live Television: since 2018
  - Excellence in Short Form Design: since 2003

=== Special awards ===
  - Career Achievement Award: since 1998
  - Hall of Fame Award: since 1998

=== Discontinued awards ===
  - Excellence in Period/Fantasy Film: 1998 to 2004
  - Excellence in Period/Fantasy Television: 1998 to 2014
  - Outstanding Made for Television Movie or Miniseries: 2005 to 2014

== Award ceremonies ==
Event	Date	Host	Ref.
1st	February 6, 1999	Anjelica Huston	
2nd	February 12, 2000	Anjelica Huston	
3rd	March 17, 2001	Tim Curry	
4th	March 16, 2002	Anjelica Huston	
5th	February 16, 2003	Anjelica Huston	
6th	February 21, 2004	Anjelica Huston	
7th	February 19, 2005	Ted Danson; Mary Steenburgen	
8th	February 25, 2006	Anjelica Huston	
9th	February 17, 2007	Jane Kaczmarek	
10th	February 19, 2008	Anjelica Huston	
11th	February 17, 2009	Debra Messing	
12th	February 25, 2010	Parker Posey	
13th	February 22, 2011	Kristin Davis	
14th	February 21, 2012	Jane Lynch	
15th	February 19, 2013	Joel McHale	
16th	February 22, 2014	Joshua Malina	
17th	February 17, 2015	Emmy Rossum	
18th	February 23, 2016	Betsy Brandt	
19th	February 21, 2017	Mandy Moore	
20th	February 20, 2018	Gina Rodriguez	
21st	February 19, 2019	Kate Walsh	
22nd	January 28, 2020	Mindy Kaling	
23rd	April 13, 2021	Lana Condor	
24th	March 9, 2022	Andrew Rannells; Casey Wilson	
25th	February 27, 2023	Tituss Burgess	
26th	February 21, 2024	Wendi McLendon-Covey	
27th	February 6, 2025	Jackie Tohn	
28th	February 12, 2026	Courtney Hope	
