= Costume Designers Guild Award for Excellence in Period Film =

Annual CDG film award

The Costume Designers Guild Award for Excellence in Period Film is one of the annual awards given by the Costume Designers Guild.

The award was previously combined with Excellence in Fantasy Film from 1999 to 2004, before being spun out into its own category in 2005.

== Winners and nominees ==
=== 2000s ===
Year	Film	Costume Designer(s)
2005	Memoirs of a Geisha	Colleen Atwood
2005	Capote	Kasia Walicka-Maimone
2005	Good Night, and Good Luck	Louise Frogley
2005	Rent	Aggie Guerard Rodgers
2005	Walk the Line	Arianne Phillips
2006	Curse of the Golden Flower	Yee Chung-man
2006	Dreamgirls	Sharen Davis
2006	The Illusionist	Ngila Dickson
2006	Marie Antoinette	Milena Canonero
2006	Pirates of the Caribbean: Dead Man's Chest	Penny Rose
2007	Sweeney Todd: The Demon Barber of Fleet Street	Colleen Atwood
2007	3:10 to Yuma	Arianne Phillips
2007	Atonement	Jacqueline Durran
2007	Elizabeth: The Golden Age	Alexandra Byrne
2007	La Vie en Rose	Marit Allen
2008	The Duchess	Michael O'Connor
2008	Changeling	Deborah Hopper
2008	The Curious Case of Benjamin Button	Jacqueline West
2008	Milk	Danny Glicker
2008	Revolutionary Road	Albert Wolsky
2009	The Young Victoria	Sandy Powell
2009	Coco Before Chanel	Catherine Leterrier
2009	Julie & Julia	Ann Roth
2009	Nine	Colleen Atwood
2009	Sherlock Holmes	Jenny Beavan

=== 2010s ===
Year	Film	Costume Designer(s)
2010	The King's Speech	Jenny Beavan
2010	The Fighter	Mark Bridges
2010	True Grit	Mary Zophres
2011	W.E.	Arianne Phillips
2011	The Artist	Mark Bridges
2011	The Help	Sharen Davis
2011	Hugo	Sandy Powell
2011	Jane Eyre	Michael O'Connor
2012	Anna Karenina	Jacqueline Durran
2012	Argo	Jacqueline West
2012	Les Misérables	Paco Delgado
2012	Lincoln	Joanna Johnston
2012	Moonrise Kingdom	Kasia Walicka-Maimone
2013	12 Years a Slave	Patricia Norris
2013	American Hustle	Michael Wilkinson
2013	Dallas Buyers Club	Kurt & Bart
2013	The Great Gatsby	Catherine Martin
2013	Saving Mr. Banks	Daniel Orlandi
2014	The Grand Budapest Hotel	Milena Canonero
2014	The Imitation Game	Sammy Sheldon Differ
2014	Inherent Vice	Mark Bridges
2014	Selma	Ruth E. Carter
2014	The Theory of Everything	Steven Noble
2015	The Danish Girl	Paco Delgado
2015	Brooklyn	Odile Dicks-Mireaux
2015	Carol	Sandy Powell
2015	Crimson Peak	Kate Hawley
2015	Trumbo	Daniel Orlandi
2016	Hidden Figures	Renee Ehrlich Kalfus
2016	The Dressmaker	Marion Boyce and Margot Wilson
2016	Florence Foster Jenkins	Consolata Boyle
2016	Hail, Caesar!	Mary Zophres
2016	Jackie	Madeline Fontaine
2017	The Shape of Water	Luis Sequeira
2017	Dunkirk	Jeffrey Kurland
2017	The Greatest Showman	Ellen Mirojnick
2017	Murder on the Orient Express	Alexandra Byrne
2017	Phantom Thread	Mark Bridges
2018	The Favourite	Sandy Powell
2018	BlacKkKlansman	Marci Rodgers
2018	Bohemian Rhapsody	Julian Day
2018	Mary Poppins Returns	Sandy Powell
2018	Mary Queen of Scots	Alexandra Byrne
2019	Jojo Rabbit	Mayes C. Rubeo
2019	Dolemite Is My Name	Ruth E. Carter
2019	Downton Abbey	Anna Mary Scott Robbins
2019	Once Upon a Time in Hollywood	Arianne Phillips
2019	Rocketman	Julian Day

=== 2020s ===
Year	Film	Costume Designer(s)
2020	Ma Rainey’s Black Bottom	Ann Roth
2020	Emma.	Alexandra Byrne
2020	Judas and the Black Messiah	Charlese Antoinette Jones
2020	Mank	Trish Summerville
2020	One Night in Miami...	Francine Jamison-Tanchuck
2021	Cruella	Jenny Beavan
2021	Cyrano	Massimo Cantini Parrini and Jacqueline Durran
2021	House of Gucci	Janty Yates
2021	Nightmare Alley	Luis Sequeira
2021	West Side Story	Paul Tazewell
2022	Elvis	Catherine Martin
2022	Babylon	Mary Zophres
2022	Don't Worry Darling	Arianne Phillips
2022	Mrs. Harris Goes to Paris	Jenny Beavan
2022	The Woman King	Gersha Phillips
2023	Poor Things	Holly Waddington
2023	Killers of the Flower Moon	Jacqueline West
2023	Maestro	Mark Bridges
2023	Napoleon	Janty Yates and Dave Crossman
2023	Oppenheimer	Ellen Mirojnick
2024	Nosferatu	Linda Muir
2024	The Book of Clarence	Antoinette Messam
2024	Gladiator II	Janty Yates and Dave Crossman
2024	Maria	Massimo Cantini Parrini
2024	Saturday Night	Danny Glicker
2025	Frankenstein	Kate Hawley
2025	Downton Abbey: The Grand Finale	Anna Mary Scott Robbins
2025	Hamnet	Malgosia Turzanska
2025	Hedda	Lindsay Pugh
2025	Sinners	Ruth E. Carter

== Designers with multiple wins ==
2 wins

- Colleen Atwood
- Jenny Beavan
- Sandy Powell

== Designers with multiple nominations ==
5 nominations

- Mark Bridges
- Arianne Phillips
- Sandy Powell

4 nominations

- Jenny Beavan
- Alexandra Byrne

3 nominations

- Colleen Atwood
- Ruth E. Carter
- Jacqueline Durran
- Jacqueline West
- Janty Yates
- Mary Zophres

2 nominations

- Milena Canonero
- Massimo Cantini Parrini
- Dave Crossman
- Sharen Davis
- Julian Day
- Paco Delgado
- Danny Glicker
- Kate Hawley
- Catherine Martin
- Ellen Mirojnick
- Michael O'Connor
- Daniel Orlandi
- Anna Mary Scott Robbins
- Ann Roth
- Luis Sequeira
- Kasia Walicka-Maimone
