= 8th Costume Designers Guild Awards =

Award ceremony for film and television costuming in 2005

- Date: February 25, 2006
- Location: The Beverly Hilton, Beverly Hills, California
- Country: United States
- Presented by: Costume Designers Guild
- Hosted by: Anjelica Huston

Highlights
- Excellence in Contemporary Film: Transamerica – Danny Glicker
- Excellence in Fantasy Film: The Chronicles of Narnia: The Lion, the Witch and the Wardrobe – Isis Mussenden
- Excellence in Period Film: Memoirs of a Geisha – Colleen Atwood

The 8th Costume Designers Guild Awards, given on February 25, 2006, honored the best costume designs in film and television for 2005. The nominees were announced on January 11, 2006.

== Winners and nominees ==
The winners are in bold.

=== Film ===
Excellence in Contemporary Film	Excellence in Period Film
**Transamerica – Danny Glicker**; Hustle & Flow – Paul Simmons; Mr. & Mrs. Smith – Michael Kaplan; Shopgirl – Nancy Steiner; Syriana – Louise Frogley	**Memoirs of a Geisha – Colleen Atwood**; Capote – Kasia Walicka-Maimone; Good Night, and Good Luck – Louise Frogley; Rent – Aggie Guerard Rodgers; Walk the Line – Arianne Phillips
Excellence in Fantasy Film
**The Chronicles of Narnia: The Lion, the Witch and the Wardrobe – Isis Mussenden**; Batman Begins – Lindy Hemming; Charlie and the Chocolate Factory – Gabriella Pescucci; Star Wars: Episode III – Revenge of the Sith – Trisha Biggar

=== Television ===
Outstanding Contemporary Television	Outstanding Period/Fantasy Television
**Six Feet Under – Jill M. Ohanneson**; Alias – Laura Goldsmith; Arrested Development – Katie Sparks; Desperate Housewives – Catherine Adair; Nip/Tuck – Lou Eyrich	**Rome – April Ferry**; Carnivàle – Chrisi Karvonides-Dushenko; Cold Case – Patia Prouty; Deadwood – Katherine Jane Bryant; That '70s Show – Melina Root
Outstanding Made for Television Movie or Miniseries
**Elvis – Eduardo Castro**; Empire Falls – Donna Zakowska; Lackawanna Blues – Hope Hanafin; Their Eyes Were Watching God – Eduardo Castro; Warm Springs – Hope Hanafin

=== Commercial ===
Excellence in Commercial Design
- **Capital One: "Viking" – Christopher Lawrence**
  - American Express: "Kate Winslet" – Tanya Gill
  - Orbit Gum – Mary Zophres

=== Special awards ===
==== Career Achievement Award ====
- Colleen Atwood (film)
- Robert Blackman (television)

==== Swarovski President’s Award ====
- Thomas Short

==== Distinguished Actor Award ====
- Joan Allen

==== Distinguished Service Award ====
- Mary Rose

==== Hall of Fame ====
- Renié
- Bill Thomas
- William Travilla
