= Ngila Dickson =

New Zealand costume designer (born 1958)

Ngila Dickson ONZM
- Born: 1958 (age 67–68); Dunedin, New Zealand
- Spouse: Hamish Keith

Ngila Beryl Dickson ONZM (born 1958) is a New Zealand costume designer. Her accolades include an Academy Award and a BAFTA Award. Dickson received the Laureate Award from the Arts Foundation of New Zealand in 2008. In 2004, she was appointed Officer of the New Zealand Order of Merit (ONZM) for services to design and the film industry.

Dickson came to prominence for her collaboration with Richard Taylor on creating the costumes for Peter Jackson's The Lord of the Rings film trilogy (2001–2003). She has been nominated for the Academy Award for Best Costume Design three times, winning for The Lord of the Rings: The Return of the King (2003).

On television, Dickson designed costumes for the fantasy television series Hercules: The Legendary Journeys (1995–1999) and Xena: Warrior Princess (1995–1999).

== Personal life ==
Dickson is married to artist and writer Hamish Keith.

== Filmography ==
=== Film ===
Year	Title	Director	Notes
1990	Ruby and Rata	Gaylene Preston	Wardrobe supervisor
1992	Crush	Alison Maclean	
1993	Jack Be Nimble	Garth Maxwell	
1994	Heavenly Creatures	Peter Jackson	
2001	The Lord of the Rings: The Fellowship of the Ring	Peter Jackson	with Richard Taylor
2002	The Lord of the Rings: The Two Towers	Peter Jackson	with Richard Taylor
2003	The Last Samurai	Edward Zwick	
2003	The Lord of the Rings: The Return of the King	Peter Jackson	with Richard Taylor
2004	Without a Paddle	Steven Brill	
2006	The Illusionist	Neil Burger	
2006	Blood Diamond	Edward Zwick	
2008	Fool's Gold	Andy Tennant	
2011	Green Lantern	Martin Campbell	
2012	Mr. Pip	Andrew Adamson	
2012	Emperor	Peter Webber	
2014	Dracula Untold	Gary Shore	
2016	Crouching Tiger, Hidden Dragon: Sword of Destiny	Yuen Woo-ping	
2018	Asura	Peng Zhang	
2019	Terminator: Dark Fate	Tim Miller	
2023	Peter Pan & Wendy	David Lowery	
2024	Madame Web	S. J. Clarkson	
2025	Predator: Badlands	Dan Trachtenberg	

=== Television ===
Year	Title	Notes
1988	The Rainbow Warrior Conspiracy	Television film
1992	The Ray Bradbury Theater	15 episodes
1993	The Rainbow Warrior	Television film
1994–1995	High Tide	3 episodes
1995–1999	Hercules: The Legendary Journeys	Unknown episodes
1995	Mysterious Island	5 episodes
1995–1999	Xena: Warrior Princess	90 episodes
1998	Young Hercules	Television film and pilot
2015	Childhood's End	3 episodes

== Awards and nominations ==
Major associations

Academy Awards

Year	Category	Nominated work	Result	Ref.
2002	Best Costume Design	The Lord of the Rings: The Fellowship of the Ring	Nominated	
2004	Best Costume Design	The Lord of the Rings: The Return of the King	Won	
2004	Best Costume Design	The Last Samurai	Nominated	

BAFTA Awards

Year	Category	Nominated work	Result	Ref.
British Academy Film Awards
2002	Best Costume Design	The Lord of the Rings: The Fellowship of the Ring	Nominated	
2003	Best Costume Design	The Lord of the Rings: The Two Towers	Won	
2004	Best Costume Design	The Lord of the Rings: The Return of the King	Nominated	

Miscellaneous awards

List of Ngila Dickson other awards and nominations
Award	Year (Note: Indicates the year of ceremony. Each year is linked to the article about the awards held that year, wherever possible.)	Category	Title	Result	Ref.
Costume Designers Guild Awards	2003	Excellence in Period/Fantasy Film	The Lord of the Rings: The Two Towers	Nominated	
Costume Designers Guild Awards	2004	Excellence in Period/Fantasy Film	The Lord of the Rings: The Return of the King	Won	
Costume Designers Guild Awards	2004	Excellence in Period/Fantasy Film	The Last Samurai	Nominated	
Costume Designers Guild Awards	2007	Excellence in Period Film	The Illusionist	Nominated	
Las Vegas Film Critics Society Awards	2002	Best Costume Design	The Lord of the Rings: The Fellowship of the Ring	Won	
Las Vegas Film Critics Society Awards	2003	Best Costume Design	The Lord of the Rings: The Two Towers	Won	
Las Vegas Film Critics Society Awards	2004	Best Costume Design	The Lord of the Rings: The Return of the King	Won	
New Zealand Film Awards	2013	Rodney Wayne Best Costume Design	Mr. Pip	Won	
Online Film Critics Society Awards	2003	Best Costume Design	The Lord of the Rings: The Two Towers	Nominated	
Online Film Critics Society Awards	2004	Best Costume Design	The Lord of the Rings: The Return of the King	Won	
Phoenix Film Critics Society Awards	2002	Best Costume Design	The Lord of the Rings: The Fellowship of the Ring	Won	
Phoenix Film Critics Society Awards	2003	Best Costume Design	The Lord of the Rings: The Two Towers	Nominated	
Phoenix Film Critics Society Awards	2004	Best Costume Design	The Last Samurai	Nominated	
Phoenix Film Critics Society Awards	2004	Best Costume Design	The Lord of the Rings: The Return of the King	Nominated	
Satellite Awards	2002	Best Costume Design	The Lord of the Rings: The Fellowship of the Ring	Nominated	
Satellite Awards	2004	Best Costume Design	The Last Samurai	Won	
Satellite Awards	2004	Best Costume Design	The Lord of the Rings: The Return of the King	Nominated	
Saturn Awards	2002	Best Costume Design	The Lord of the Rings: The Fellowship of the Ring	Nominated	
Saturn Awards	2003	Best Costume Design	The Lord of the Rings: The Two Towers	Won (Note: Tied with Trisha Biggar for Star Wars: Episode II – Attack of the Clones)	
Saturn Awards	2004	Best Costume Design	The Lord of the Rings: The Return of the King	Nominated	
Saturn Awards	2015	Best Costume Design	Dracula Untold	Won	
Saturn Awards	2026	Best Costume Design	Predator: Badlands	Nominated	

== Other honours ==
- Dickson was appointed an Officer of the New Zealand Order of Merit (ONZM) in the 2004 Queen's Birthday Honours for services to design and the film industry.
- Dickson received an Arts Foundation Laureate Award from the Arts Foundation of New Zealand in 2008.
