= Julie Weiss =

American costume designer

- Occupation: Costume designer
- Years active: 1975–present

Julie Weiss is an American costume designer. She has received various accolades, including two Costume Designers Guild Awards and two Emmy Awards, in addition to nominations for two Academy Awards, a BAFTA Award, and a Tony Award. She was honored with the Costume Designers Guild Career Achievement Award in 2011.

On stage, Weiss created costumes for many Broadway productions. She received the Tony Award for Best Costume Design nomination for the original Broadway production of the Bernard Pomerance play The Elephant Man (1979).

== Selected filmography ==
=== Film ===
Year	Title	Director	Notes
1982	I'm Dancing as Fast as I Can	Jack Hofsiss	
1983	Independence Day	Robert Mandel	
1983	Second Thoughts	Lawrence Turman	
1983	Spacehunter: Adventures in the Forbidden Zone	Lamont Johnson	
1983	Testament	Lynne Littman	
1985	The Mean Season	Phillip Borsos	
1985	Creator	Ivan Passer	
1986	F/X	Robert Mandel	
1987	Masters of the Universe	Gary Goddard	
1988	1969	Ernest Thompson	
1988	Tequila Sunrise	Robert Towne	
1989	Wicked Stepmother	Larry Cohen	
1989	Steel Magnolias	Herbert Ross	
1990	The Freshman	Andrew Bergman	
1991	Married to It	Arthur Hiller	
1992	Honeymoon in Vegas	Andrew Bergman	
1993	House of Cards	Michael Lessac	
1993	Searching for Bobby Fischer	Steven Zaillian	
1993	Naked in New York	Daniel Algrant	
1994	It Could Happen to You	Andrew Bergman	
1995	12 Monkeys	Terry Gilliam	
1996	Marvin's Room	Jerry Zaks	
1997	Touch	Paul Schrader	
1997	The Edge	Lee Tamahori	
1998	Fear and Loathing in Las Vegas	Terry Gilliam	
1998	Finding Graceland	David Winkler	
1998	A Simple Plan	Sam Raimi	
1999	American Beauty	Sam Mendes	
2000	Isn't She Great	Andrew Bergman	
2000	Get Carter	Stephen Kay	
2000	The Gift	Sam Raimi	
2001	Hearts in Atlantis	Scott Hicks	
2002	Frida	Julie Taymor	
2002	Auto Focus	Paul Schrader	
2002	The Ring	Gore Verbinski	
2003	The Missing	Ron Howard	
2005	Fun with Dick and Jane	Dean Parisot	
2006	Hollywoodland	Allen Coulter	
2006	Bobby	Emilio Estevez	
2007	Blades of Glory	Will Speck; Josh Gordon	
2007	Slipstream	Anthony Hopkins	
2008	Lower Learning	Mark Lafferty	
2009	The Time Traveler's Wife	Robert Schwentke	
2009	Get Low	Aaron Schneider	
2010	Shanghai	Mikael Håfström	
2011	No Strings Attached	Ivan Reitman	
2012	Hitchcock	Sacha Gervasi	
2017	November Criminals	Sacha Gervasi	
2020	Greyhound	Aaron Schneider	
2022	Call Jane	Phyllis Nagy	

=== Television ===
Year	Title	Notes
1977–1978	Lovers and Friends	aka For Richer, For Poorer; 212 episodes
1982	The Elephant Man	Television film
1982	Little Gloria... Happy at Last	2 episodes
1984	The Dollmaker	Television film
1984	Family Secrets	Television film
1985	Alfred Hitchcock Presents	Television film and pilot
1985	Do You Remember Love	Television film
1985	Evergreen	3 episodes
1991	My Life and Times	Episode: "April 9, 2035"
1992	Liza Live from Radio City Music Hall	with Isaac Mizrahi; Television special
1993	The Portrait	Television film
1995	A Woman of Independent Means	3 episodes
2005	Mrs. Harris	Television film
2012	Of Two Minds	Television film
2016	The Night Of	Episode: "The Beach"
2018	My Dinner with Hervé	Television film
2020	Filthy Rich	Episode: "Pilot"

== Awards and nominations ==
Major associations

Academy Awards

Year	Category	Nominated work	Result	Ref.
1996	Best Costume Design	12 Monkeys	Nominated	
2003	Best Costume Design	Frida	Nominated	

BAFTA Awards

Year	Category	Nominated work	Result	Ref.
British Academy Film Awards
2003	Best Costume Design	Frida	Nominated	

Emmy Awards

Year	Category	Nominated work	Result	Ref.
Primetime Emmy Awards
1982	Outstanding Costumes for a Miniseries, Movie, or Special	The Elephant Man	Nominated	
1983	Outstanding Costumes for a Miniseries, Movie, or Special	Little Gloria... Happy at Last	Nominated	
1984	Outstanding Costumes for a Miniseries, Movie, or Special	The Dollmaker	Won	
1985	Outstanding Costumes for a Miniseries, Movie, or Special	Evergreen (Episode: "Part 1")	Nominated	
1993	Outstanding Costumes for a Variety Program or Special	Liza Minnelli: Live from Radio City Music Hall	Nominated	
1995	Outstanding Costumes for a Miniseries, Movie, or Special	A Woman of Independent Means (Episode: "Part 1")	Won	
2006	Outstanding Costumes for a Miniseries, Movie, or Special	Mrs. Harris	Nominated	

Tony Awards

Year	Category	Nominated work	Result	Ref.
1979	Best Costume Design	The Elephant Man	Nominated	

Miscellaneous awards

List of Julie Weiss other awards and nominations
Award	Year (Note: Indicates the year of ceremony. Each year is linked to the article about the awards held that year, wherever possible.)	Category	Title	Result	Ref.
Costume Designers Guild Awards	2000	Excellence in Contemporary Film	American Beauty	Won	
Costume Designers Guild Awards	2003	Excellence in Period/Fantasy Film	Frida	Nominated	
Costume Designers Guild Awards	2007	Outstanding Made for Television Movie or Miniseries	Mrs. Harris	Nominated	
Costume Designers Guild Awards	2008	Excellence in Contemporary Film	Blades of Glory	Won	
Costume Designers Guild Awards	2011	Career Achievement Award	—N/a	Honored	
Drama Desk Awards	1979	Outstanding Costume Design	The Elephant Man	Nominated	
Satellite Awards	2003	Best Costume Design	Frida	Won	
Saturn Awards	1988	Best Costume Design	Masters of the Universe	Nominated	
Saturn Awards	1996	Best Costume Design	12 Monkeys	Won	
