= Nancy Steiner =

American costume designer

- Occupation: Costume designer
- Website: https://www.nancysteinercostumes.com/

Nancy Steiner is an American costume designer. Her film credits include The Virgin Suicides (1999), The Good Girl (2002), Lost in Translation (2003), Little Miss Sunshine (2006), and The Lovely Bones (2009).

== Early life ==
Her career started in the late 1980s styling bands for music videos and assisting on films and commercials. Some of the bands Nancy worked with include Stone Temple Pilots, Filter, R.E.M., The Rolling Stones, The Smashing Pumpkins, Red Hot Chili Peppers, Nirvana, Foo Fighters, No Doubt, Sheryl Crow, David Bowie, Air, Fat Boy Slim, Bjork, and R.E.M.. As time went on Nancy entered the world of film by designing Todd Haynes celebrated film "SAFE", then working with directors such as Sofia Coppola, Michel Gondry, Wim Wenders, Jonathan Dayton & Valerie Faris, Peter Jackson, and Miguel Arteta to name a few. Nancy also works in the commercial world with directors including Mark Romanek, Stacy Wall, Sebastian Strasser, Speck/Gordon and Dougal Wilson.

== Awards and nominations ==
Award	Year	Category	Work	Result	Ref.
Costume Designers Guild Awards	2004	Excellence in Commercial Design	Bacardi & Cola	Won	
Costume Designers Guild Awards	2006	Excellence in Contemporary Film	Shopgirl	Nominated	
Costume Designers Guild Awards	2007	Excellence in Contemporary Film	Little Miss Sunshine	Nominated	
Costume Designers Guild Awards	2014	Excellence in Commercial Design	Call of Duty: "Ghosts Masked Warriors"	Won	
Costume Designers Guild Awards	2021	Excellence in Contemporary Film	Promising Young Woman	Won	
Critics' Choice Awards	2021	Best Costume Design	Promising Young Woman	Nominated	
