= 9th Costume Designers Guild Awards =

Award ceremony for film and television costuming in 2006

- Date: February 17, 2007
- Location: Beverly Wilshire Hotel, Beverly Hills, California
- Country: United States
- Presented by: Costume Designers Guild
- Hosted by: Jane Kaczmarek

Highlights
- Excellence in Contemporary Film: The Queen – Consolata Boyle
- Excellence in Fantasy Film: Pan's Labyrinth – Lala Huete
- Excellence in Period Film: Curse of the Golden Flower – Yee Chung-Man

The 9th Costume Designers Guild Awards, given on February 17, 2007, honoured the best costume designs in film and television for 2006. The nominees were announced on January 10, 2007.

== Winners and nominees ==
The winners are in bold.

=== Film ===
| Excellence in Contemporary Film | Excellence in Period Film |
|---|---|
| **The Queen – Consolata Boyle**; Babel – Gabriela Dialque, Miwako Kobayashi and Michael Wilkinson; Casino Royale – Lindy Hemming; The Devil Wears Prada – Patricia Field; Little Miss Sunshine – Nancy Steiner | **Curse of the Golden Flower – Yee Chung-man**; Dreamgirls – Sharen Davis; The Illusionist – Ngila Dickson; Marie Antoinette – Milena Canonero; Pirates of the Caribbean: Dead Man's Chest – Penny Rose |
Excellence in Fantasy Film
**Pan's Labyrinth – Lala Huete**; Eragon – Kym Barrett; The Fountain – Renée April; V for Vendetta – Sammy Sheldon; X-Men: The Last Stand – Judianna Makovsky

=== Television ===
| Outstanding Contemporary Television | Outstanding Period/Fantasy Television |
|---|---|
| **Ugly Betty – Eduardo Castro**; Big Love – Chrisi Karvonides-Dushenko; Desperate Housewives – Catherine Adair; Entourage – Amy Westcott; The Sopranos – Juliet Polcsa | **Rome – April Ferry**; Cold Case – Patia Prouty and Maria Schicker; Deadwood – Katherine Jane Bryant |
Outstanding Made for Television Movie or Miniseries
**Elizabeth I – Mike O'Neill**; Bleak House – Andrea Galer; High School Musical – Tom McKinley; Into the West – Michael T. Boyd; Mrs. Harris – Julie Weiss

=== Commercial ===
Excellence in Commercial Design
- **Target: "Branding Circle" – Jennifer Rade**
  - GEICO: "Cavemen" – Casey Storm
  - Target: "Holiday Home Decor" – Jennifer Rade

=== Special awards ===
==== Career Achievement Award ====
- Patricia Norris (film)
- Grady Hunt (television)

==== Swarovski President’s Award ====
- Sandra Bullock

==== Distinguished Actor Award ====
- Helen Mirren

==== Hall of Fame ====
- Donfeld
