= Patricia Field =

American costume designer, stylist and fashion designer

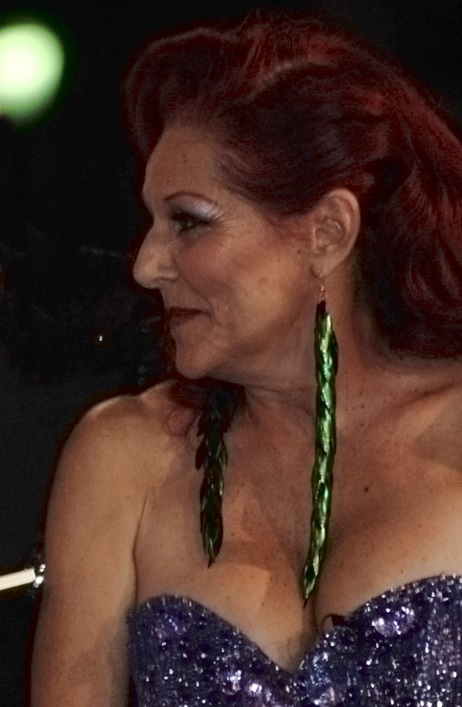
- Field at Life Ball 2009
- Born: February 12, 1942 (age 84); New York City, New York, U.S.
- Education: New York University
- Occupations: Costume and fashion designer
- Website: patriciafield.com

Patricia Field (born February 12, 1942) is an American costume designer, stylist, and fashion designer working in New York City.

== Early life ==
Field was born in New York City to an Armenian father and a Greek mother, who emigrated from Plomari, Lesbos. She was raised in Queens, where her family owned a drycleaning store; her father died when she was 8 years old. She studied government and philosophy at New York University.

== Fashion career ==
With her then-partner Jo-Ann Salvucci, Field opened her first boutique, Pants Pub, in 1966 on Washington Place in Greenwich Village. The shop, later renamed to the eponymous Patricia Field, moved in 1971 to 8th Street, then to West Broadway, and finally to 306 Bowery in NoHo, where Field owned the property. She sold it in 2016 to concentrate on costume designing for television and film. In 2018 she opened the ARTFashion Gallery on the Lower East Side, which sells art and hand-painted original clothing and accessories by a selected group of artists.

Field is credited with originating the fashion for leggings in the 1970s. Her stores were popular with the transgender and underground communities; she became known for what she calls "freaky fashion".

Her design influences include John Galliano, Diane von Furstenberg, and Thierry Mugler. She was a mentor for fashion designer Hushidar Mortezaie.

== Costuming ==
Field was the costume designer for the 1987 film Lady Beware and the TV series Crime Story. After she met Sarah Jessica Parker during the filming of 1995's Miami Rhapsody, they became friends and Field was engaged to design the costumes for the TV series Sex and the City. The show became well known for its fashions, particularly for their individuality and unexpectedness. For her work on Sex and the City, Field was nominated for five Emmy Awards, with one win, and nominated for six Costume Designers Guild awards, with four wins. She is one out of six honorees of the 2008 Real Time Film Festival. She returned as costume designer for the 2008 movie Sex and the City and its 2010 sequel Sex and the City 2. She briefly returned to the series reboot And Just Like That… to style Kim Cattrall for her cameo as Samantha Jones in the season 2 finale.

After the successes of the Sex and the City costumes, Field was in high demand for new projects in television and film. Her other television credits include Hope & Faith, Kath & Kim, Ugly Betty, Younger on TV Land, season 11 of Murphy Brown, and Emily in Paris. In 2011, she designed most of the outfits for the characters in a Taiwan television drama called Material Queen.

In film, her credits include The Devil Wears Prada, for which she was nominated for the Academy Award for Best Costume Design, and Second Act (2018). In the Asian market, she created the fashion behind the 2010 Chinese feature film Go Lala Go! (Chinese: 杜拉拉升职记).

She designed the outfits in Namie Amuro's music videos for her three songs "New Look", "Rock Steady", and "What A Feeling" from her single 60s 70s 80s; as well as Anna Vissi's music videos for "Stin Pyra" and "Alitissa Psihi" from her album Apagorevmeno.

A documentary film on her career called Happy Clothes: A Film About Patricia Field, directed by Michael Selditch, had its world premiere at the Tribeca Festival in 2023.

== Television appearances ==
Field appeared as the first guest judge during the first season of the Bravo reality television series Project Runway. Her boutique was featured in a 2007 episode of Kathy Griffin's reality show My Life on the D-List and in a 2008 episode of Paris Hilton's My New BFF. She also appeared as a guest judge during the third episode of cycle 15 of America's Next Top Model.

== Publications ==
In February 2023, she published a memoir, Pat in the City: My Life of Fashion, Style, and Breaking All the Rules.

== Personal life ==
Field is a lesbian, and was in a long-term relationship with costume designer Rebecca Weinberg (Field), with whom she partnered on Sex and the City.

Field defended Dior head designer John Galliano after he was arrested in February 2011 over alleged antisemitic comments in a Paris bar, describing Galliano's videotaped behavior in a phone interview with WWD as "farce" and "theater".

== Awards and nominations ==
Award	Year	Category	Work	Result	Ref.
Academy Awards	2007	Best Costume Design	The Devil Wears Prada	Nominated	
British Academy Film Awards	2006	Best Costume Design	The Devil Wears Prada	Nominated	
Costume Designers Guild Awards	2000	Excellence in Contemporary Television	Sex and the City	Won	
Costume Designers Guild Awards	2001	Excellence in Contemporary Television	Sex and the City	Won	
Costume Designers Guild Awards	2002	Excellence in Contemporary Television	Sex and the City	Nominated	
Costume Designers Guild Awards	2003	Excellence in Contemporary Television	Sex and the City	Nominated	
Costume Designers Guild Awards	2004	Excellence in Contemporary Television	Sex and the City	Won	
Costume Designers Guild Awards	2005	Excellence in Contemporary Television	Sex and the City	Won	
Costume Designers Guild Awards	2007	Excellence in Contemporary Film	The Devil Wears Prada	Nominated	
Costume Designers Guild Awards	2009	Excellence in Contemporary Film	Sex and the City	Nominated	
Costume Designers Guild Awards	2009	Excellence in Contemporary Television	Ugly Betty	Won	
Costume Designers Guild Awards	2010	Excellence in Contemporary Television	Ugly Betty	Nominated	
Costume Designers Guild Awards	2021	Excellence in Contemporary Television	Emily in Paris (Episode: "Faux Amis")	Nominated	
Costume Designers Guild Awards	2022	Excellence in Contemporary Television	Emily in Paris (Episode: "French Revolution")	Won	
FashFilmFete	2023	Costume Design Career Achievement Award in Television	—N/a	Honored	
Primetime Emmy Awards	1990	Outstanding Costumes for a Variety, Nonfiction, or Reality Programming	Mother Goose Rock 'n' Rhyme	Won	
Primetime Emmy Awards	2000	Outstanding Costumes for a Series	Sex and the City (Episode: "La Douleur Exquise!")	Nominated	
Primetime Emmy Awards	2001	Outstanding Costumes for a Series	Sex and the City (Episode: "Sex and Another City")	Nominated	
Primetime Emmy Awards	2002	Outstanding Costumes for a Series	Sex and the City (Episode: "Defining Moments")	Won	
Primetime Emmy Awards	2003	Outstanding Costumes for a Series	Sex and the City (Episode: "I Love a Charade")	Nominated	
Primetime Emmy Awards	2004	Outstanding Costumes for a Series	Sex and the City (Episode: "An American Girl in Paris, Part Deux")	Nominated	
Primetime Emmy Awards	2009	Outstanding Costumes for a Series	Ugly Betty (Episode: "In the Stars")	Nominated	
Satellite Awards	2006	Best Costume Design	The Devil Wears Prada	Won	
Satellite Awards	2008	Best Costume Design	Sex and the City	Nominated	
