= 16th Costume Designers Guild Awards =

Award ceremony for film and television costuming in 2013

- Date: February 22, 2014
- Location: The Beverly Hilton, Beverly Hills, California
- Country: United States
- Presented by: Costume Designers Guild
- Hosted by: Joshua Malina

Highlights
- Excellence in Contemporary Film: Blue Jasmine – Suzy Benzinger
- Excellence in Fantasy Film: The Hunger Games: Catching Fire – Trish Summerville
- Excellence in Period Film: 12 Years a Slave – Patricia Norris

The 16th Costume Designers Guild Awards, honoring the best costume designs in film, television, and media for 2013, was held on February 22, 2014. The nominees were announced on January 8, 2014.

== Winners and nominees ==
The winners are in bold.

=== Film ===
Excellence in Contemporary Film	Excellence in Period Film
**Blue Jasmine – Suzy Benzinger**; Her – Casey Storm; Nebraska – Wendy Chuck; Philomena – Consolata Boyle; The Secret Life of Walter Mitty – Sarah Edwards	**12 Years a Slave – Patricia Norris**; American Hustle – Michael Wilkinson; Dallas Buyers Club – Kurt & Bart; The Great Gatsby – Catherine Martin; Saving Mr. Banks – Daniel Orlandi
Excellence in Fantasy Film
**The Hunger Games: Catching Fire – Trish Summerville**; The Hobbit: The Desolation of Smaug – Bob Buck, Ann Maskrey and Richard Taylor; Oz the Great and Powerful – Gary Jones and Michael Kutsche

=== Television ===
Outstanding Contemporary Television	Outstanding Period/Fantasy Television
**House of Cards – Tom Broecker**; Breaking Bad – Jennifer L. Bryan; Nashville – Susie DeSanto; Saturday Night Live – Tom Broecker and Eric Justian; Scandal – Lyn Paolo	**Downton Abbey – Caroline McCall**; Boardwalk Empire – John Dunn and Lisa Padovani; The Borgias – Gabriella Pescucci; Game of Thrones – Michele Clapton; Mad Men – Janie Bryant
Outstanding Made for Television Movie or Miniseries
**Behind the Candelabra – Ellen Mirojnick**; American Horror Story: Coven – Lou Eyrich; Bonnie & Clyde – Marilyn Vance; House of Versace – Claire Nadon; Phil Spector – Debra McGuire

=== Commercial ===
Excellence in Commercial Design
- **Call of Duty: "Ghosts Masked Warriors" – Nancy Steiner**
  - Dos Equis: "The Most Interesting Man in the World Feeds a Bear" – Julie Vogel
  - Fiat "British Invasion" – Donna Zakowska

=== Special awards ===
==== Career Achievement Award ====
- April Ferry

==== LACOSTE Spotlight Award ====
- Amy Adams

==== Distinguished Collaborator Award ====
- Judd Apatow

==== Distinguished Service Award ====
- Sharon Day
