= Arianne Phillips =

American costume designer

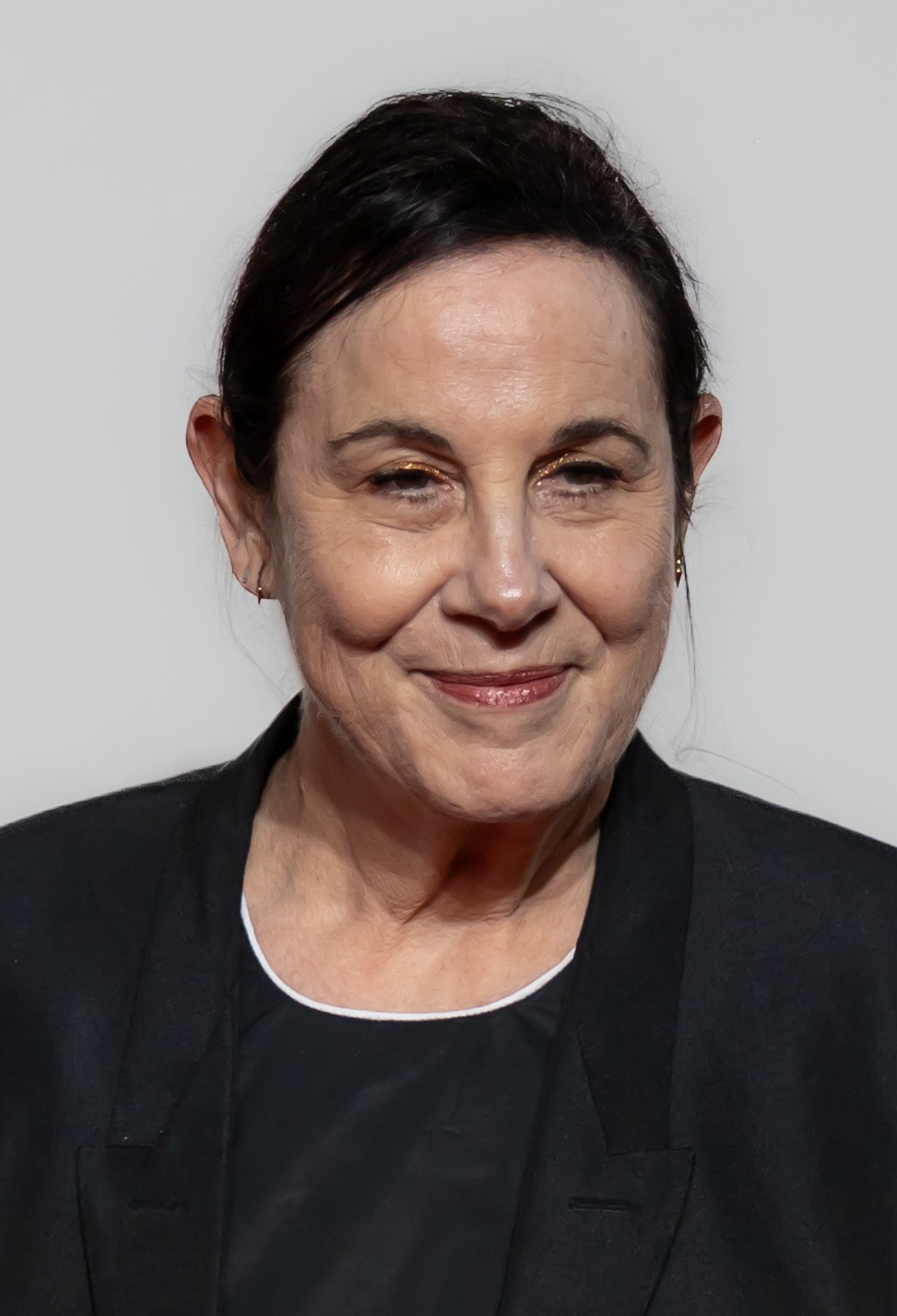
- Born: April 26, 1963 (age 63); New York City, New York, U.S.
- Occupation: Costume designer

Arianne Phillips (born April 26, 1963) is an American costume designer. Her accolades include a Costume Designers Guild Award, in addition to nominations for four Academy Awards, three BAFTA Awards, and a Tony Award.

== Early life and career ==
Phillips was raised in northern California and began making fashion sketches as a child. She relocated to New York in the early 1980s where she began working as an assistant stylist. She was initially recognized for helping to style Lenny Kravitz for his debut album, Let Love Rule.

== Career ==
Phillips was recognized for her work on the Broadway musical Hedwig and the Angry Inch, starring Neil Patrick Harris, earning her a Tony award nomination for Best Costume Design. Phillips has a long-standing relationship with Madonna, with collaborations including photos shoots, music videos and designing tour costumes for six world tours over the past two decades. She has been nominated for the Academy Award for Best Costume Design three times, for James Mangold's Walk the Line (2005), Madonna's directorial debut, W.E. (2011), and for Quentin Tarantino's Once Upon a Time in Hollywood (2019). Phillips has also received a three BAFTA Award nominations for Tom Ford’s A Single Man (2009), Quentin Tarantino's Once Upon a Time in Hollywood, and James Mangold's A Complete Unknown.

Her film career also includes Tom Ford's Nocturnal Animals (2016), Matthew Vaughn’s Kingsman: The Secret Service (2014) and Kingsman: The Golden Circle (2017), James Mangold’s Girl, Interrupted (1999) and 3:10 to Yuma (2007), John Cameron Mitchell’s Hedwig And the Angry Inch (2001), Mark Romanek’s One Hour Photo (2002), and Milos Forman’s The People Vs. Larry Flynt (1996).

In between film and music projects, Phillips works as a freelance fashion editor and stylist, collaborating with photographers for publications such as Italian Vogue, V Magazine, Harper’s Bazaar, German & Spanish Vogue and W Magazine. She continuously challenges herself by taking on projects that explore new expressions of her creativity. In 2018, she made her New York City Metropolitan opera debut, designing Nico Muhly’s opera, Marnie.

Miuccia Prada selected Phillips for her Iconoclasts project; to curate installations for the brands flagship stores in London and Beijing which included a short fashion film for the brand, which Phillips wrote and directed, called Passages. Her friend Alessandro Michele Creative Director of GUCCI commissioned her to create content for a special issue of A Magazine he guest edited and to style a brand film directed by Gia Coppola. She has also collaborated on special projects with Van Cleef and Arpels, Cartier, Valentino and Swarovski. Phillips was an inaugural member of the TIMES UP coalition and was asked by Reese Witherspoon to design its logo.

== Filmography ==
Year	Title	Director	Notes
1991	Pyrates	Noah Stern	
1993	The Last Supper	Daryl Hannah	Short film
1993	Attack of the 50 Ft. Woman	Christopher Guest	Television film
1994	The Crow	Alex Proyas	
1995	Élisa	Jean Becker	
1995	Tank Girl	Rachel Talalay	
1995	Duke of Groove	Griffin Dunne	Short film
1996	The People vs. Larry Flynt	Miloš Forman	
1997	Going All the Way	Mark Pellington	
1997	Best Men	Tamra Davis	
1998	The Replacement Killers	Antoine Fuqua	
1999	The Mod Squad	Scott Silver	
1999	Girl, Interrupted	James Mangold	
2001	Hedwig and the Angry Inch	John Cameron Mitchell	
2002	One Hour Photo	Mark Romanek	
2002	Swept Away	Guy Ritchie	
2003	Identity	James Mangold	
2005	Walk the Line	James Mangold	
2007	3:10 to Yuma	James Mangold	
2009	A Single Man	Tom Ford	
2010	Knight and Day	James Mangold	
2011	W.E.	Madonna	
2015	Kingsman: The Secret Service	Matthew Vaughn	
2016	Nocturnal Animals	Tom Ford	
2017	Kingsman: The Golden Circle	Matthew Vaughn	
2019	Once Upon a Time in Hollywood	Quentin Tarantino	
2022	Don't Worry Darling	Olivia Wilde	
2024	Joker: Folie à Deux	Todd Phillips	
2024	A Complete Unknown	James Mangold	
2026	The Invite	Olivia Wilde	
2026	I Want Your Sex	Gregg Araki	
2027	The Nightingale †	Michael Morris	Filming

Key
†	Denotes films that have not yet been released

== Theatre ==
Year	Production	Venue	Notes
2014	Hedwig and the Angry Inch	Belasco Theatre	Broadway
2017	Marnie	English National Opera	Commissioned by the Metropolitan Opera as a co-production with the ENO; Premiered at the ENO in November 2017
2018	Head Over Heels	Hudson Theatre	Broadway
2018	Marnie	Metropolitan Opera	Transferred to the Met in October 2018

== Awards and nominations ==
Major associations

Academy Awards

Year	Category	Nominated work	Result	Ref.
2006	Best Costume Design	Walk the Line	Nominated	
2012	Best Costume Design	W.E.	Nominated	
2020	Best Costume Design	Once Upon a Time in Hollywood	Nominated	
2025	Best Costume Design	A Complete Unknown	Nominated	

BAFTA Awards

Year	Category	Nominated work	Result	Ref.
British Academy Film Awards
2010	Best Costume Design	A Single Man	Nominated	
2020	Best Costume Design	Once Upon a Time in Hollywood	Nominated	
2025	Best Costume Design	A Complete Unknown	Nominated	

Tony Awards

Year	Category	Nominated work	Result	Ref.
2014	Best Costume Design in a Musical	Hedwig and the Angry Inch	Nominated	

Miscellaneous awards

List of Arianne Phillips other awards and nominations
Award	Year (Note: Indicates the year of ceremony. Each year is linked to the article about the awards held that year, wherever possible.)	Category	Title	Result	Ref.
Astra Film and Creative Arts Awards	2020	Best Costume Design	Once Upon a Time in Hollywood	Nominated	
Capri Hollywood International Film Festival	2020	Best Costume Design	Once Upon a Time in Hollywood	Won	
Chicago Film Critics Association Awards	2019	Best Costume Design	Once Upon a Time in Hollywood	Nominated	
Costume Designers Guild Awards	2002	Excellence in Period/Fantasy Film	Hedwig and the Angry Inch	Nominated	
Costume Designers Guild Awards	2006	Excellence in Period Film	Walk the Line	Nominated	
Costume Designers Guild Awards	2008	Excellence in Period Film	3:10 to Yuma	Nominated	
Costume Designers Guild Awards	2012	Excellence in Period Film	W.E.	Won	
Costume Designers Guild Awards	2016	Excellence in Contemporary Film	Kingsman: The Secret Service	Nominated	
Costume Designers Guild Awards	2017	Excellence in Contemporary Film	Nocturnal Animals	Nominated	
Costume Designers Guild Awards	2018	Excellence in Contemporary Film	Kingsman: The Golden Circle	Nominated	
Costume Designers Guild Awards	2020	Excellence in Period Film	Once Upon a Time in Hollywood	Nominated	
Costume Designers Guild Awards	2023	Excellence in Period Film	Don't Worry Darling	Nominated	
Critics' Choice Awards	2020	Best Costume Design	Once Upon a Time in Hollywood	Nominated	
Hamilton Behind the Camera Awards	2024	Costume Design	A Complete Unknown	Won	
London Film Critics' Circle Awards	2025	Technical Achievement Award	A Complete Unknown	Nominated	
Newport Beach Film Festival	2024	Creative Visionary Award	A Complete Unknown and Joker: Folie à Deux	Won	
Outer Critics Circle Awards	2019	Outstanding Costume Design	Head Over Heels	Nominated	
San Diego Film Critics Society Awards	2019	Best Costume Design	Once Upon a Time in Hollywood	Nominated	
Saturn Awards	1995	Best Costume Design	The Crow	Nominated	
Saturn Awards	2016	Best Costume Design	Kingsman: The Secret Service	Nominated	
Saturn Awards	2021	Best Costume Design	Once Upon a Time in Hollywood	Nominated	
Seattle Film Critics Society Awards	2019	Best Costume Design	Once Upon a Time in Hollywood	Nominated	
Venice Film Festival	2022	Campari Passion for Film Award	—N/a	Honored	
