= Costume Designers Guild Award for Outstanding Made for Television Movie or Miniseries =

Discontinued CDG TV award

The Costume Designers Guild Award for Outstanding Made for Television Movie or Miniseries was one of the annual awards given by the Costume Designers Guild from 2005 until 2014.

At the 1st Costume Designers Guild Awards ceremony (celebrating excellence in film and television of 1998), all television programs, regardless of genre or format, competed in a combined Excellence in Television category. Among the inaugural nominees, all five were either limited series or television films, which makes it the only time with no regularly continued series recognized by the Guild. Starting from the subsequent ceremony, several genre-specific categories have been introduced. Since its inception and from 2015 onwards, miniseries and television films, among other shows were admitted, in accordance with their respective genres, into either Excellence in Contemporary, Period, or Sci-Fi/Fantasy Television.

== Winners and nominees ==
=== 2000s ===
Year	Series	Costume Designer(s)	Network
2005	Elvis	Eduardo Castro	CBS
2005	Empire Falls	Donna Zakowska	HBO
2005	Lackawanna Blues	Hope Hanafin	HBO
2005	Their Eyes Were Watching God	Eduardo Castro	ABC
2005	Warm Springs	Hope Hanafin	HBO
2006	Elizabeth I	Mike O'Neill	HBO
2006	Bleak House	Andrea Galer	PBS
2006	High School Musical	Tom McKinley	Disney
2006	Into the West	Michael T. Boyd	TNT
2006	Mrs. Harris	Julie Weiss	HBO
2007	Bury My Heart at Wounded Knee	Mario Davignon	HBO
2007	Jane Eyre	Andrea Galer	PBS
2007	The Starter Wife	Debra McGuire and Marion Boyce	USA
2008	John Adams	Donna Zakowska	HBO
2008	Bernard and Doris	Joseph G. Aulisi	HBO
2008	Coco Chanel	Stefano De Nardis	Lifetime
2008	Cranford	Jenny Beavan	PBS
2008	Sense and Sensibility	Michele Clapton	PBS
2009	Grey Gardens	Catherine Marie Thomas	HBO
2009	Georgia O'Keeffe	Michael Dennison	Lifetime
2009	Little Dorrit	Barbara Kidd	PBS

=== 2010s ===
Year	Film	Costume Designer(s)	Network
2010	Temple Grandin	Cindy Evans	HBO
2010	The Pacific	Penny Rose	HBO
2010	You Don't Know Jack	Rita Ryack	HBO
2011	Downton Abbey	Susannah Buxton	PBS
2011	The Kennedys	Christopher Hargadon	Reelz
2011	Mildred Pierce	Ann Roth	HBO
2012	American Horror Story: Asylum	Lou Eyrich	FX
2012	Hatfields & McCoys	Karri Hutchinson	History
2012	Hemingway & Gellhorn	Ruth Myers	HBO
2013	Behind the Candelabra	Ellen Mirojnick	HBO
2013	American Horror Story: Coven	Lou Eyrich	FX
2013	Bonnie & Clyde	Marilyn Vance	Lifetime
2013	House of Versace	Claire Nadon	Lifetime
2013	Phil Spector	Debra McGuire	HBO
2014	American Horror Story: Freak Show	Lou Eyrich	FX
2014	Houdini	Birgit Hutter	History
2014	The Normal Heart	Daniel Orlandi	HBO
2014	Olive Kitteridge	Jenny Eagan	HBO
2014	Sherlock	Sarah Arthur	PBS

== Designers with multiple wins ==
2 wins

- Lou Eyrich

== Programs with multiple wins ==
2 wins

- American Horror Story

== Designers with multiple nominations ==
3 nominations

- Lou Eyrich

2 nominations

- Eduardo Castro
- Andrea Galer
- Hope Hanafin
- Debra McGuire
- Donna Zakowska

== Programs with multiple nominations ==
3 nominations

- American Horror Story
