= Lindy Hemming =

Welsh costume designer (born 1948)

- Born: 21 August 1948 (age 77); Haverfordwest, Wales
- Occupation: Costume designer
- Years active: 1975–present

Lindy Hemming (born 21 August 1948) is a Welsh costume designer. She has received various accolades, including an Academy Award and two Costume Designers Guild Awards, in addition to nominations for two BAFTA Film Awards, a BAFTA Television Award, and a Tony Award.

== Early life and education ==
Hemming was born on 21 August 1948, in Haverfordwest, Wales. She is the eldest of five children in the family. Her mother was a teacher who could draw, design, and make clothes, mostly converting children's hand-me-downs. Her father was a salesman and often worked as a woodcarver. She was brought up bilingually from an early age, speaking Welsh at school and English at home.

Hemming never considered design a profession nor even attended art school because her father convinced her that she should pursue a "worthwhile" job for a living. Having trained as an orthopaedic nurse instead, she later discovered that this experience was helpful in her career because it required working closely with people and observing and listening to them.

She eventually enrolled at the Royal Academy of Dramatic Art (RADA), being encouraged by the example of friends. Hemming initially intended to study stage management; however, she switched her major to design soon afterward.

== Career ==
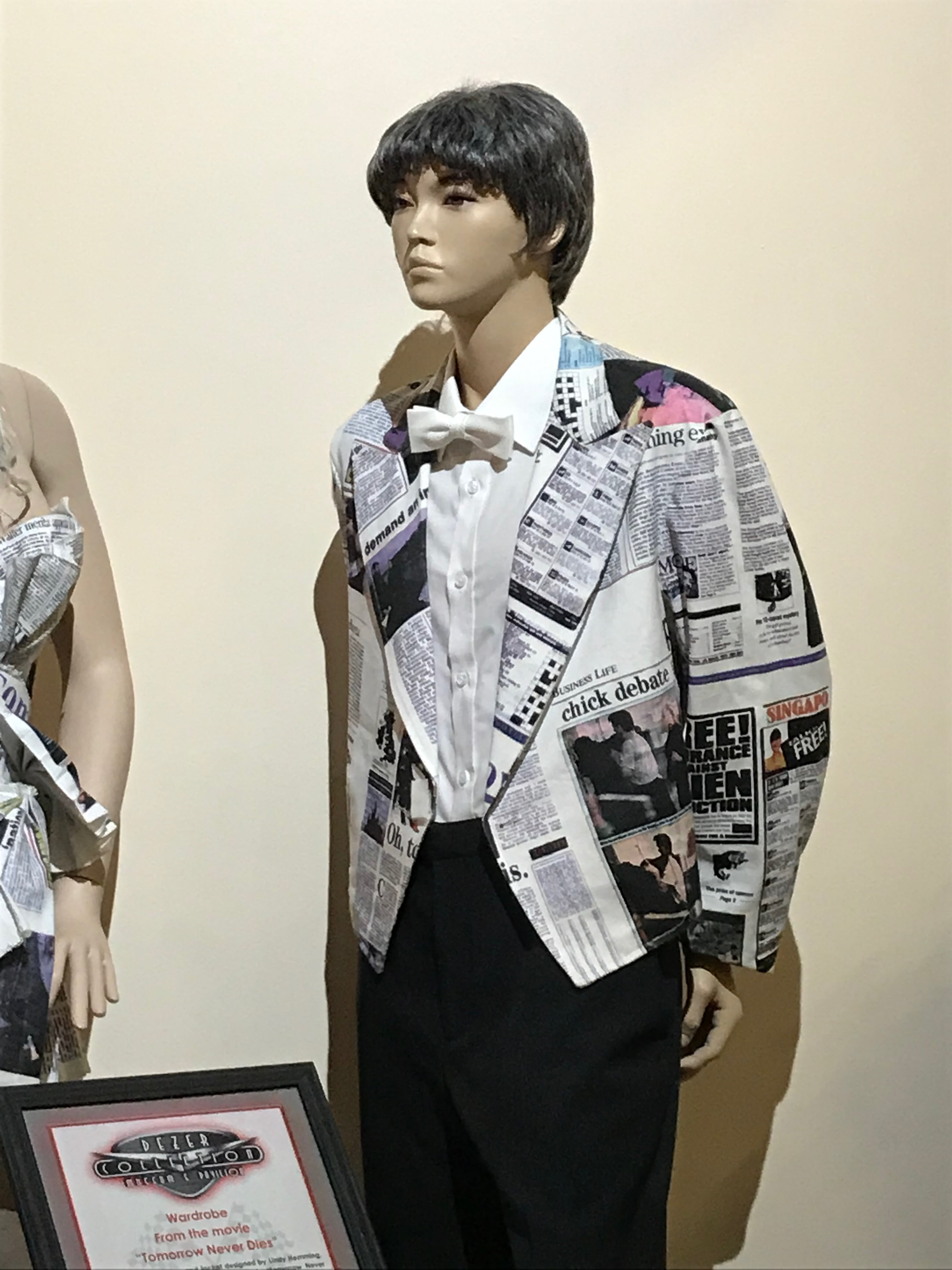
A costume from Tomorrow Never Dies on display at the Dezer Collection in Miami, designed by Hemming.

Hemming began her professional career at London's Open Space Theatre, where she performed multitask duties and often operated on a limited budget, a commitment that lasted for over a decade. She also worked for several years at the Hampstead Theatre Club. During that time, Hemming met many prominent directors, such as Michael Rudman, Alan Ayckbourn, Trevor Nunn, Richard Eyre, Howard Davies, and Nancy Meckler, who frequently asked her about collaboration on bigger-scale productions. She consequently made various designs for some of the biggest companies on the British stage and, at one point, had five London shows running simultaneously; those include productions for the Royal National Theatre, the Royal Shakespeare Company, and the West End. She also worked on Broadway and received a Tony Award for Best Costume Design nomination for the 1983 production of Shakespeare's All's Well That Ends Well.

Beside her theater career, Hemming is known for her work on several high-profile film productions across independent films and blockbusters. In particular, she has had frequent collaborations with English auteur Mike Leigh. She garnered praise and won the Academy Award for Best Costume Design for her recreation of Gilbert and Sullivan's 1885 production of The Mikado in Leigh's period musical Topsy-Turvy (1999). Hemming has also enjoyed a long-standing association with the James Bond film series, as she has designed the franchise's attire for more than a decade, starting from GoldenEye (1995) through Casino Royale (2006). Two of these pieces, which were featured in Tomorrow Never Dies (1997), have been presented among other memorabilia in a special Bond-related exhibition at the Miami Auto Museum at the Dezer Collection.

Hemming achieved further critical acclaim for providing the costumes in Christopher Nolan's The Dark Knight trilogy (2005–2012). She earned the CDG Award as well as a BAFTA Award nomination for her work in the series' second installment, The Dark Knight (2008).

== Filmography ==
=== Film ===
Year	Title	Director	Notes
1984	Comfort and Joy	Bill Forsyth	
1985	Loose Connections	Richard Eyre	
1985	Wetherby	David Hare	
1985	My Beautiful Laundrette	Stephen Frears	
1986	Heavenly Pursuits	Charles Gormley	
1988	High Hopes	Mike Leigh	
1989	When the Whales Came	Clive Rees	
1989	Queen of Hearts	Jon Amiel	
1990	The Krays	Peter Medak	
1990	Life Is Sweet	Mike Leigh	
1991	Hear My Song	Peter Chelsom	
1992	Waterland	Stephen Gyllenhaal	
1993	The Innocent	John Schlesinger	Costume consultant
1993	Naked	Mike Leigh	
1994	Four Weddings and a Funeral	Mike Newell	
1994	Sister My Sister	Nancy Meckler	
1995	Funny Bones	Peter Chelsom	
1995	GoldenEye	Martin Campbell	
1996	Blood and Wine	Bob Rafelson	
1997	The Brave	Gregory Mcdonald	
1997	Prince Valiant	Anthony Hickox	
1997	Tomorrow Never Dies	Roger Spottiswoode	
1998	Little Voice	Mark Herman	
1999	Topsy-Turvy	Mike Leigh	
1999	The Trench	William Boyd	with David Crossman
1999	The World Is Not Enough	Michael Apted	
2000	The Man Who Cried	Sally Potter	
2001	Lara Croft: Tomb Raider	Simon West	
2002	Harry Potter and the Chamber of Secrets	Chris Columbus	
2002	Die Another Day	Lee Tamahori	
2003	Lara Croft: Tomb Raider – The Cradle of Life	Jan de Bont	
2005	Batman Begins	Christopher Nolan	
2006	Casino Royale	Martin Campbell	
2008	The Dark Knight	Christopher Nolan	
2010	Edge of Darkness	Martin Campbell	
2010	Clash of the Titans	Louis Leterrier	
2012	The Dark Knight Rises	Christopher Nolan	
2014	Hector and the Search for Happiness	Peter Chelsom	Costume consultant
2014	Paddington	Paul King	
2017	Wonder Woman	Patty Jenkins	
2017	Paddington 2	Paul King	
2020	Wonder Woman 1984	Patty Jenkins	
2023	Wonka	Paul King	

=== Television ===
Year	Title	Notes
1983	Meantime	Television film
1987	Porterhouse Blue	4 episodes
1987	The Short and Curlies	Television short film
1992	Screen One	Episode: "Running Late"
1994	Screen Two	Episode: "All Things Bright and Beautiful"

== Awards and nominations ==
Major associations

Academy Awards

Year	Category	Nominated work	Result	Ref.
2000	Best Costume Design	Topsy-Turvy	Won	

BAFTA Awards

Year	Category	Nominated work	Result	Ref.
British Academy Film Awards
1995	Best Costume Design	Four Weddings and a Funeral	Nominated	
2009	Best Costume Design	The Dark Knight	Nominated	
British Academy Television Craft Awards
1988	Best Costume Design	Porterhouse Blue	Nominated	
BAFTA Cymru
2018	Siân Phillips Award	—N/a	Honored	

Tony Awards

Year	Category	Nominated work	Result	Ref.
1983	Best Costume Design	All's Well That Ends Well	Nominated	

Miscellaneous awards

List of Lindy Hemming other awards and nominations
Award	Year (Note: Indicates the year of ceremony. Each year is linked to the article about the awards held that year, wherever possible.)	Category	Title	Result	Ref.
Costume Designers Guild Awards	2006	Excellence in Fantasy Film	Batman Begins	Nominated	
Costume Designers Guild Awards	2007	Excellence in Contemporary Film	Casino Royale	Nominated	
Costume Designers Guild Awards	2009	Excellence in Fantasy Film	The Dark Knight	Won	
Costume Designers Guild Awards	2018	Excellence in Sci-Fi/Fantasy Film	Wonder Woman	Won	
Costume Designers Guild Awards	2021	Excellence in Sci-Fi/Fantasy Film	Wonder Woman 1984	Nominated	
Critics' Choice Awards	2018	Best Costume Design	Wonder Woman	Nominated	
Critics' Choice Awards	2024	Best Costume Design	Wonka	Nominated	
Phoenix Film Critics Society Awards	2003	Best Costume Design	Harry Potter and the Chamber of Secrets	Nominated	
Phoenix Film Critics Society Awards	2017	Best Costume Design	Wonder Woman	Nominated	
San Diego Film Critics Society Awards	2018	Best Costume Design	Paddington 2	Runner-up	
Saturn Awards	2003	Best Costume Design	Harry Potter and the Chamber of Secrets	Nominated	
Saturn Awards	2006	Best Costume Design	Batman Begins	Nominated	
Saturn Awards	2009	Best Costume Design	The Dark Knight	Nominated	
Saturn Awards	2018	Best Costume Design	Wonder Woman	Nominated	
Saturn Awards	2025	Best Costume Design	Wonka	Nominated	
