= Ellen Mirojnick =

American costume designer (born 1949)

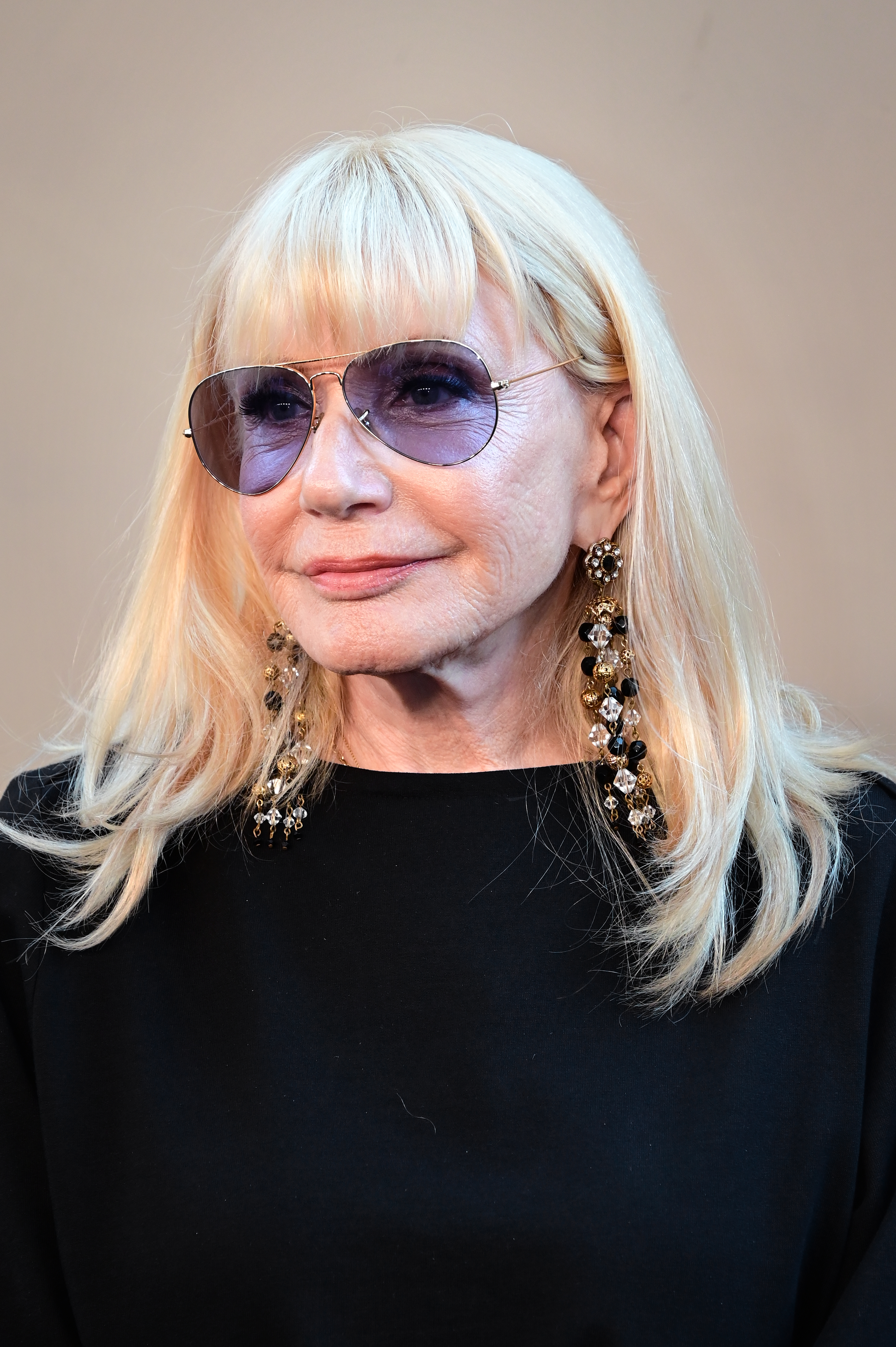
- Mirojnick in 2026
- Born: July 7, 1949 (age 77); New York City, United States
- Education: School of Visual Arts, Parsons School of Design
- Occupation: Costume designer
- Years active: 1970–present

Ellen Mirojnick (born July 7, 1949 in New York City) is an American costume designer. She is a frequent collaborator of actor Michael Douglas, having overseen the costume design for the films Fatal Attraction (1987), Wall Street (1987), Basic Instinct (1992), A Perfect Murder (1998), Wall Street: Money Never Sleeps (2010) and Behind the Candelabra (2013). The wardrobe which she created for the character of Gordon Gekko inspired a fashion trend in the late 1980s and early 1990s for boldly patterned ties, sleek suits, crisp white shirts, and colorful suspenders in men's business wear. She has also been a frequent collaborator of directors Jan de Bont and Paul Verhoeven, acting as costume designer on de Bont's films Speed (1994), Twister (1996) and The Haunting (1999), as well as Verhoeven's films Basic Instinct (1992), Showgirls (1995), Starship Troopers (1997) and Hollow Man (2000).

== Awards ==
She won an Emmy and a Costume Designers Guild Award in 2013 for her work on the Liberace biopic Behind the Candelabra. In 2016, she was given the Career Achievement Award by the Costume Designers Guild. In 2017, she gained further praise for her work on the biographical musical drama film The Greatest Showman starring Hugh Jackman, which garnered her a nomination for Excellence in Period Film with the Costume Designers Guild. In 2023, Mirojnick received acclaim for her costume design in Christopher Nolan's epic biographical thriller film Oppenheimer starring Cillian Murphy, Emily Blunt, and Robert Downey Jr., for which Mirojnick received nominations for an Academy Award for Best Costume Design and a BAFTA Award for Best Costume Design.

Sharon Stone has praised her experience with Mirojnick on Basic Instinct:

“I don’t think I had any idea, really, that I could look so great. Then I was like, "‘Oh, I could look like that all the time. Maybe I should get with it.’" Ellen really taught me how to feel empowered like the character I was playing.”

== Selected filmography ==
=== Film ===
Year	Title	Director	Notes
1978	French Quarter	Dennis Kane	
1980	Fame	Alan Parker	Assistant costume designer
1981	Endless Love	Franco Zeffirelli	Assistant to costume designer
1984	Reckless	James Foley	Also makes a cameo as Physics Teacher
1984	The Flamingo Kid	Garry Marshall	
1986	Nobody's Fool	Evelyn Purcell	
1987	Fatal Attraction	Adrian Lyne	
1987	Wall Street	Oliver Stone	
1988	Cocktail	Roger Donaldson	
1988	Talk Radio	Oliver Stone	
1989	Black Rain	Ridley Scott	
1989	Always	Steven Spielberg	
1990	Jacob's Ladder	Adrian Lyne	
1991	Switch	Blake Edwards	
1991	Mobsters	Michael Karbelnikoff	
1992	Basic Instinct	Paul Verhoeven	
1992	Chaplin	Richard Attenborough	with John Mollo
1993	Cliffhanger	Renny Harlin	
1994	Intersection	Mark Rydell	
1994	Speed	Jan de Bont	
1994	Exit to Eden	Garry Marshall	
1995	Strange Days	Kathryn Bigelow	
1995	Showgirls	Paul Verhoeven	
1996	Mulholland Falls	Lee Tamahori	
1996	Twister	Jan de Bont	
1996	The Ghost and the Darkness	Stephen Hopkins	
1997	Face/Off	John Woo	
1997	Starship Troopers	Paul Verhoeven	
1998	A Perfect Murder	Andrew Davis	
1999	The Haunting	Jan de Bont	
1999	Mickey Blue Eyes	Kelly Makin	
2000	Hollow Man	Paul Verhoeven	
2000	What Women Want	Nancy Meyers	
2001	One Night at McCool's	Harald Zwart	
2001	America's Sweethearts	Joe Roth	
2001	Rat Race	Jerry Zucker	
2001	Don't Say a Word	Gary Fleder	
2002	Unfaithful	Adrian Lyne	
2003	It Runs in the Family	Fred Schepisi	
2004	Twisted	Philip Kaufman	
2004	The Chronicles of Riddick	David Twohy	
2006	Failure to Launch	Tom Dey	
2006	The Sentinel	Clark Johnson	
2006	Déjà Vu	Tony Scott	
2007	King of California	Mike Cahill	
2008	Cloverfield	Matt Reeves	
2008	Mirrors	Alexandre Aja	
2009	G-Force	Hoyt Yeatman	
2009	G.I. Joe: The Rise of Cobra	Stephen Sommers	
2009	Solitary Man	Brian Koppelman; David Levien	Mirojnick only designed costumes for Michael Douglas
2010	Wall Street: Money Never Sleeps	Oliver Stone	
2010	Killers	Robert Luketic	Mirojnick only designed costumes for Ashton Kutcher and Katherine Heigl
2013	Odd Thomas	Stephen Sommers	Costume consultant
2013	Agent Carter	Louis D'Esposito	with Timothy A. Wonsik; Mirojnick only designed costumes for Hayley Atwell; Short film
2014	Need for Speed	Scott Waugh	
2014	And So It Goes	Rob Reiner	
2014	Beyond the Reach	Jean-Baptiste Léonetti	Costume consultant
2015	By the Sea	Angelina Jolie	
2017	Logan Lucky	Steven Soderbergh	
2017	First They Killed My Father	Angelina Jolie	
2017	The Greatest Showman	Michael Gracey	
2018	The Girl in the Spider's Web	Fede Álvarez	Mirojnick only designed costumes for Claire Foy
2019	The Laundromat	Steven Soderbergh	
2019	Maleficent: Mistress of Evil	Joachim Rønning	
2020	Let Them All Talk	Steven Soderbergh	
2021	Cinderella	Kay Cannon	
2022	Kimi	Steven Soderbergh	
2023	Oppenheimer	Christopher Nolan	
2025	The Gorge	Scott Derrickson	
2025	Black Bag	Steven Soderbergh	
2026	The Odyssey	Christopher Nolan	

=== Television ===
Year	Title	Notes
1982	Fame	Episode: "Metamorphosis"
1997	The Wonderful World of Disney	Episode: "Rodgers & Hammerstein's Cinderella"
2011	Person of Interest	Episode: "Ghosts"
2012	GCB	Episode: "Pilot"
2013	Behind the Candelabra	Television film
2014–2015	The Knick	20 episodes
2014	How to Get Away with Murder	Episode: "Pilot"
2020	Bridgerton	8 episodes

== Awards and nominations ==
Major associations

Academy Awards

Year	Category	Nominated work	Result	Ref.
2024	Best Costume Design	Oppenheimer	Nominated	

BAFTA Awards

Year	Category	Nominated work	Result	Ref.
British Academy Film Awards
1993	Best Costume Design	Chaplin	Nominated	
2014	Best Costume Design	Behind the Candelabra	Nominated	
2024	Best Costume Design	Oppenheimer	Nominated	

Emmy Awards

Year	Category	Nominated work	Result	Ref.
Primetime Emmy Awards
1998	Outstanding Costumes for a Variety Program or Special	Rodgers & Hammerstein's Cinderella	Nominated	
2013	Outstanding Costumes for a Miniseries, Movie, or Special	Behind the Candelabra	Won	
2023	Outstanding Period Costumes	Bridgerton (Episode: "Diamond of the First Water")	Nominated	

Miscellaneous awards

List of Ellen Mirojnick other awards and nominations
Award	Year (Note: Indicates the year of ceremony. Each year is linked to the article about the awards held that year, wherever possible.)	Category	Title	Result	Ref.
Costume Designers Guild Awards	2003	Excellence in Contemporary Film	Unfaithful	Nominated	
Costume Designers Guild Awards	2011	Excellence in Contemporary Film	Wall Street: Money Never Sleeps	Nominated	
Costume Designers Guild Awards	2014	Outstanding Made for Television Movie or Miniseries	Behind the Candelabra	Won	
Costume Designers Guild Awards	2015	Excellence in Period/Fantasy Television	The Knick	Nominated	
Costume Designers Guild Awards	2016	Excellence in Period Television	The Knick	Won	
Costume Designers Guild Awards	2016	Career Achievement Award	—N/a	Honored	
Costume Designers Guild Awards	2018	Excellence in Period Film	The Greatest Showman	Nominated	
Costume Designers Guild Awards	2020	Excellence in Contemporary Film	The Laundromat	Nominated	
Costume Designers Guild Awards	2020	Excellence in Sci-Fi/Fantasy Film	Maleficent: Mistress of Evil	Won	
Costume Designers Guild Awards	2021	Excellence in Period Television	Bridgerton (Episode: "Diamond of the First Water")	Nominated	
Costume Designers Guild Awards	2024	Excellence in Period Film	Oppenheimer	Nominated	
Hollywood Beauty Awards	2018	Outstanding Achievement in Costume Design and Styling	—N/a	Honored	
Las Vegas Film Critics Society Awards	2023	Best Costume Design	Oppenheimer	Nominated	
Middleburg Film Festival	2026	Variety Creative Collaborators Award	Oppenheimer and The Odyssey	Won (Note: Mirojnick, as costume designer, along with production designer Ruth De Jong and film editor Jennifer Lame, received a joint award for their respective contributions to the same films.)	
Online Film Critics Society Awards	2024	Best Costume Design	Oppenheimer	Nominated	
San Diego Film Critics Society Awards	2023	Best Costume Design	Oppenheimer	Nominated	
Satellite Awards	2024	Best Costume Design	Oppenheimer	Nominated	
Saturn Awards	1998	Best Costume Design	Starship Troopers	Won	
Saturn Awards	2018	Best Costume Design	The Greatest Showman	Nominated	
Saturn Awards	2024	Best Costume Design	Oppenheimer	Nominated	
St. Louis Film Critics Association Awards	2023	Best Costume Design	Oppenheimer	Nominated	
