= 6th Costume Designers Guild Awards =

Award ceremony for film and television costuming in 2003

- Date: February 21, 2004
- Location: The Beverly Hilton, Beverly Hills, California
- Country: United States
- Presented by: Costume Designers Guild
- Hosted by: Anjelica Huston

Highlights
- Excellence in Contemporary Film: A Mighty Wind – Durinda Wood
- Excellence in Period/Fantasy Film: The Lord of the Rings: The Return of the King – Ngila Dickson

The 6th Costume Designers Guild Awards, given on February 21, 2004, honored the best costume designs in film and television for 2003. The nominees were announced on January 4, 2004.

== Winners and nominees ==
The winners are in bold.

=== Film ===
Excellence in Contemporary Film	Excellence in Period/Fantasy Film
**A Mighty Wind – Durinda Wood**; Charlie's Angels: Full Throttle – Joseph G. Aulisi; Kill Bill: Volume 1 – Catherine Marie Thomas; Legally Blonde 2: Red, White & Blonde – Sophie De Rakoff Carbonell	**The Lord of the Rings: The Return of the King – Ngila Dickson**; The Last Samurai – Ngila Dickson; Pirates of the Caribbean: The Curse of the Black Pearl – Penny Rose; Seabiscuit – Judianna Makovsky

=== Television ===
Excellence in Contemporary Television	Excellence in Period/Fantasy Television
**Sex and the City – Patricia Field**; Alias – Laura Goldsmith; Six Feet Under – Jill M. Ohanneson; The Sopranos – Juliet Polcsa; Will & Grace – Lori Eskowitz-Carter	**Carnivàle – Ruth Myers ("Pilot"); Terry Dresbach (Series)**; And Starring Pancho Villa as Himself – Eduardo Castro; Angels in America – Ann Roth; Hitler: The Rise of Evil – Maria Schicker

=== Commercial ===
Excellence in Commercial Design
- **Bacardi & Cola – Nancy Steiner**
  - Pier 1 Imports "Santa Baby" – Ivan Ingermann

=== Special awards ===
==== Career Achievement Award ====
- James Acheson (film)
- Noel Taylor (television)

==== LACOSTE President’s Award ====
- Tzetzi Ganev
- Tomas Velasco

==== Distinguished Actor Award ====
- Holly Hunter

==== Hall of Fame ====
- Howard Greer
- Richard Hornung
- Robert Kalloch
- Bernard Newman
