= 23rd Costume Designers Guild Awards =

Award ceremony for film and television costuming in 2020

- Date: April 13, 2021
- Location: Virtual ceremony
- Country: United States
- Presented by: Costume Designers Guild
- Hosted by: Lana Condor

Highlights
- Excellence in Contemporary Film: Promising Young Woman – Nancy Steiner
- Excellence in Period Film: Ma Rainey's Black Bottom – Ann Roth
- Excellence in Sci-Fi/Fantasy Film: Mulan – Bina Daigeler

The 23rd Costume Designers Guild Awards, honoring the best costume designs in film, television, and media for 2020, was held on April 13, 2021. The nominees were announced on March 4, 2021.

== Winners and nominees ==
The winners are in bold.

=== Film ===
| Excellence in Contemporary Film | Excellence in Period Film |
|---|---|
| **Promising Young Woman – Nancy Steiner**; Barb and Star Go to Vista Del Mar – Trayce Gigi Field; Birds of Prey (and the Fantabulous Emancipation of One Harley Quinn) – Erin Benach; Da 5 Bloods – Donna Berwick; The Prom – Lou Eyrich | **Ma Rainey's Black Bottom – Ann Roth**; Emma. – Alexandra Byrne; Judas and the Black Messiah – Charlese Antoinette Jones; Mank – Trish Summerville; One Night in Miami... – Francine Jamison-Tanchuck |
Excellence in Sci-Fi/Fantasy Film
**Mulan – Bina Daigeler**; Dolittle – Jenny Beavan; Jingle Jangle: A Christmas Journey – Michael Wilkinson; Pinocchio – Massimo Cantini Parrini; Wonder Woman 1984 – Lindy Hemming

=== Television ===
| Excellence in Contemporary Television | Excellence in Period Television |
|---|---|
| **Schitt's Creek: "Happy Ending" – Debra Hanson**; Emily in Paris: "Faux Amis" – Patricia Field and Marylin Fitoussi; Euphoria: "Part 1: Rue – Trouble Don't Last Always" – Heidi Bivens; I May Destroy You: "Social Media is a Great Way to Connect" – Lynsey Moore; Unorthodox: "Part 2" – Justine Seymour | **The Queen's Gambit: "End Game" – Gabriele Binder**; Bridgerton: "Diamond of the First Water" – Ellen Mirojnick and John W. Glaser III; The Crown: "Terra Nullius" – Amy Roberts; Lovecraft Country: "I Am" – Dayna Pink; Mrs. America: "Shirley" – Bina Daigeler |
| Excellence in Sci-Fi/Fantasy Television | Excellence in Variety, Reality-Competition, Live Television |
| **Westworld: "Parce Domine" – Shay Cunliffe**; The Mandalorian: "Chapter 13: The Jedi" – Shawna Trpcic; Snowpiercer: "Access is Power" – Cynthia Summers; Star Trek: Picard: "Absolute Candor" – Christine Bieselin Clark; What We Do in the Shadows: "Nouveau Théâtre des Vampires" – Amanda Neale | **Hamilton – Paul Tazewell**; Dancing with the Stars: "Villains Night" – Daniela Gschwendtner and Steven Norman Lee; The Masked Dancer: "Premiere – Everybody Mask Now!" – Gabrielle Letamendi and Candice Rainwater; The Masked Singer: "The Semifinals – The Super Six" – Marina Toybina; Saturday Night Live: "John Mulaney/The Strokes" – Tom Broecker and Eric Justian |

=== Short Form ===
Excellence in Short Form Design
- **Apple: Shot on iPhone by Damien Chazelle – Vertical Cinema "The Stunt Double" short film – April Napier**
  - The Killers: "Caution" music video – Samantha Kuester
  - Selena Gomez: "Boyfriend" music video – Dawn Ritz and Kenn Law
  - Tim Burton Themed Halloween Party short film – Dawn Ritz
  - The Weeknd: "Blinding Lights" music video – Ami Goodheart

=== Special awards ===
==== Distinguished Collaborator Award ====
- Shonda Rhimes and Betsy Beers
