= Suttirat Anne Larlarb =

American costume designer, art director, and production designer

Suttirat Anne Larlarb (born 1971) is an American costume designer, art director and production designer.

== Life ==
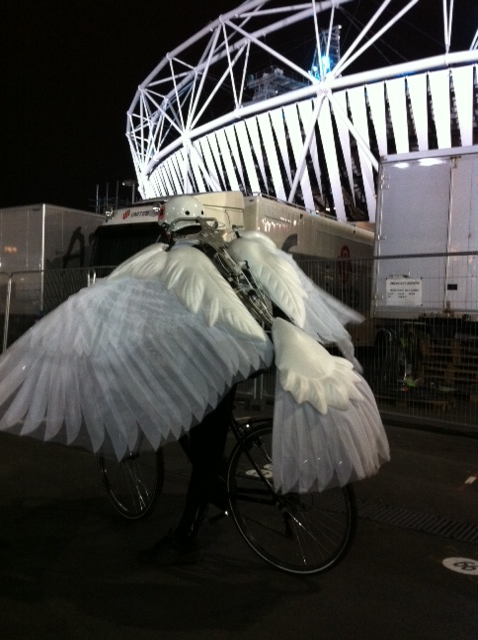
A 'dove bike', designed by Larlarb, at the 2012 Summer Olympics opening ceremony

Larlarb's parents are both Thai, and came to the US as Fulbright scholars. Her father went on to become a heart surgeon. Larlarb was born in North Carolina and raised in Ventura County, California. She was interested in drawing from an early age, and attended Stanford University where she studied studio art, before winning a Jacob K. Javits Fellowship and entering Yale University's School of Drama MFA program, where she studied under Ming Cho Lee.

Larlarb moved to London after graduating, and worked as Assistant Designer, responsible for sets and costumes, to theatrical designer Richard Hudson. The first major film on which she worked was Danny Boyle's The Beach; Larlarb has worked many times with Boyle since, both in film productions (Sunshine, Slumdog Millionaire, 127 Hours and Trance), theatrical productions (Frankenstein), and for the 2012 Summer Olympics opening ceremony in London.

Larlarb was the Designer of the 2012 Summer Olympics opening ceremony, together with Mark Tildesley. She also designed the costumes and the 'dove bikes'. She spoke of the creative brainstorming process in developing the ceremony between Boyle, Tildesley, and writer Frank Cottrell Boyce: "It was so open. It could be anything. We were bouncing around every idea that came into our head about what was essentially British. Not being British, I could represent what the world thought Britain meant. Our mantra was that everything should feel human-scale: individual and idiosyncratic, less about slickness and perfection." For her work on the ceremony, Larlarb was listed as one of "London's 1000 most influential people 2012" by the London Evening Standard, which commented that "the extraordinary dove bikes [were] her proudest achievement."

== Selected stage work ==
- Assistant Designer, responsible for sets and costumes, to theatrical designer Richard Hudson on several operas:
  - Khovanshchina at the Opéra Bastille in Paris
  - Tamerlano at the Maggio Musicale in Florence
  - Ernani at the Vienna State Opera
- Costume Designer, Frankenstein at the National Theatre, London
- Larlarb's stage design work was also included in the exhibition "Curtain Call: Celebrating A Century of Women Designing for Live Performance" at the New York Public Library of Performing Arts at the Lincoln Center, New York
- Larlarb was the Costume Designer for Anna Shapiro's Broadway revival of Of Mice and Men in 2014.
- Costume Designer, Waitress at the American Repertory Theater, Cambridge and Broadway.
- Costume designer for the 2022 Macbeth revival directed by Sam Gold at the Longacre Theatre

== Filmography ==
Year	Film	Role	Notes
1991	Shelf Life (short film)	Art Director	
1998	Back to Even	Art Director	(as Anne Larlarb)
2000	The Beach	Art Department Assistant	(as Suttirat 'Anne' Larlarb)
2001	Enigma	Assistant Art Director	(as Suttirat Larlarb)
2001	Serendipity	Art Director (re-shoots)	
2001	K-PAX	Art Director (New York)	(as Suttirat Larlarb)
2002	Gunplay (short film)	Production Designer	
2002	Men in Black II	Assistant Art Director (New York)	(as Suttirat Larlarb)
2003	Ash Tuesday	Production Designer	
2003	A Foreign Affair (released on DVD as Two Brothers and a Bride)	Production Designer (Mexico)	
2004	Alfie	Art Director (New York)	
2004	Garfield: The Movie	Art Director	(as Suttirat Larlarb)
2005	The Skeleton Key	Art Director (New Orleans)	
2006	The Namesake	Art Director	(as Suttirat Larlarb)
2007	The Savages	Art Director	(as Suttirat Larlarb)
2007	Sunshine	Costume Designer	
2008	My Sassy Girl	Art Director	
2008	Slumdog Millionaire	Costume Designer	Costume Designers Guild Award for Excellence in Contemporary Film
2010	127 Hours	Production Designer; Costume Designer	(as Suttirat Larlarb). Nominated—Art Directors Guild Award for Excellence in Production Design for a Contemporary Film
2010	The American	Costume Designer	
2010	The Extra Man	Costume Designer	
2010	Peacock	Costume Designer	
2011	Beastly	Costume Designer	(as Suttirat Larlarb)
2011	Cinema Verite	Costume Designer	Nominated—Primetime Emmy Award for Outstanding Costumes for a Miniseries, Movie, or Special
2013	Trance	Costume Designer	
2015	Steve Jobs	Costume Designer	
2021	No Time to Die	Costume Designer	
2022	Obi-Wan Kenobi	Costume Designer	
2027	Star Wars: Starfighter	Costume Designer	
