= Jeffrey Kurland =

American costume designer

- Occupation: Costume designer

Jeffrey Kurland is an American costume designer. He was nominated for an Academy Award in the category Best Costume Design for the film Bullets Over Broadway. He was honored with the Costume Designers Guild Career Achievement Award in 2017.

== Filmography ==
Year	Title	Director	Notes
1981	The Fan	Ed Bianchi	
1984	Broadway Danny Rose	Woody Allen	
1985	The Purple Rose of Cairo	Woody Allen	
1986	Hannah and her Sisters	Woody Allen	
1986	Streets of Gold	Joe Roth	
1987	Radio Days	Woody Allen	Won - BAFTA Award for Best Costume Design
1987	Revenge of the Nerds II: Nerds in Paradise	Joe Roth	
1987	September	Woody Allen	
1988	Another Woman	Woody Allen	
1989	Crimes and Misdemeanors	Woody Allen	
1990	Quick Change	Howard Franklin; Bill Murray	
1990	Alice	Woody Allen	
1991	Shadows and Fog	Woody Allen	
1992	This Is My Life	Nora Ephron	
1992	Husbands and Wives	Woody Allen	
1993	Manhattan Murder Mystery	Woody Allen	
1994	Bullets Over Broadway	Woody Allen	Nominated - Academy Award for Best Costume Design
1994	Mixed Nuts	Nora Ephron	
1995	Mighty Aphrodite	Woody Allen	
1996	Everyone Says I Love You	Woody Allen	
1997	My Best Friend's Wedding	P. J. Hogan	
1998	Living Out Loud	Richard LaGravenese	
1999	In Dreams	Neil Jordan	
1999	Man on the Moon	Miloš Forman	
2000	Erin Brockovich	Steven Soderbergh	Won - Costume Designers Guild Award for Excellence in Contemporary Film
2001	What's the Worst That Could Happen?	Sam Weisman	
2001	Ocean's Eleven	Steven Soderbergh	Nominated - Costume Designers Guild Award for Excellence in Contemporary Film
2004	Hidalgo	Joe Johnston	
2004	Criminal	Gregory Jacobs	
2004	Collateral	Michael Mann	
2007	Nancy Drew	Andrew Fleming	
2007	Nim's Island	Jennifer Flackett; Mark Levin	
2009	Law Abiding Citizen	F. Gary Gray	
2010	Inception	Christopher Nolan	Nominated - Costume Designers Guild Award for Excellence in Contemporary Film
2012	The Dictator	Larry Charles	
2013	Beautiful Creatures	Richard LaGravenese	
2015	Tomorrowland	Brad Bird	
2016	Ghostbusters	Paul Feig	
2017	Dunkirk	Christopher Nolan	Nominated - Costume Designers Guild Award for Excellence in Period Film; Nominated - Satellite Award for Best Costume Design
2018	Mission: Impossible – Fallout	Christopher McQuarrie	
2020	Tenet	Christopher Nolan	
2023	Haunted Mansion	Justin Simien	Nominated - Costume Designers Guild Award for Excellence in Sci-Fi/Fantasy Film
2025	The Alto Knights	Barry Levinson	
