= Gary Jones (costume designer) =

American costume designer

- Born: 24 February 1947 (age 78); Toledo, Ohio, US
- Occupation: Costume designer
- Years active: 1979–present

Gary Jones (born 24 February 1947) is an American costume designer who has nearly 60 costume credits in films and TV. He is perhaps most known for his work on films such as Oz the Great and Powerful and The Talented Mr. Ripley.

He was nominated at the 72nd Academy Awards in the category of Best Costumes for his work on the film The Talented Mr. Ripley. His nomination was shared with Ann Roth.
