= Michael T. Boyd =

American costume designer

Michael T. Boyd is a costume designer from Texas. A graduate of Texas A&I University, Boyd specializes in period films, and has provided costumes for a number of films, TV miniseries, and other productions, including:

- We Were Soldiers
- Mudbound
- The 24th
- Dolly Parton's Heartstrings (Netflix series)
- Dolly Parton's Coat of Many Colors
- Dolly Parton's Christmas of Many Colors: Circle of Love
- Monte Walsh (Tom Selleck remake)
- Surface
- Into the West
- 3: The Dale Earnhardt Story
- The Faculty
- McHale's Navy
- In the Army Now
- Chasers
- Gettysburg

In 1991, Boyd won an Emmy Award in Outstanding Achievement in Costuming for a Miniseries or Special for Son of the Morning Star. In 2006 he was nominated for his second Emmy and the Designers Guild Award for the epic miniseries Into the West. He has also had small roles in some of these projects.
