= Bina Daigeler =

German costume designer

- Occupation: Costume designer

Bina Daigeler is a German costume designer. She was nominated for an Academy Award in the category Best Costume Design for Mulan.

In February 2025, Daigeler joined the main competition jury at the 75th Berlin International Film Festival, presided over by Todd Haynes.

== Selected filmography ==
- All About My Mother (1999)
- Volver (2006)
- Only Lovers Left Alive (2013)
- Out of the Dark (2014)
- Hitman: Agent 47 (2015)
- Manifesto (2015)
- Hands of Stone (2016)
- Snowden (2016)
- The Zookeeper's Wife (2017)
- Submergence (2017)
- Entebbe (2018)
- Dumplin' (2018)
- Mulan (2020)
- Tár (2022)
- The Mother (2023)
- Fingernails (2023)
- The Room Next Door (2024)
- Mother Mary (2026)
