= Danny Glicker =

American costume designer

- Occupation: Costume designer

Danny Glicker is an American costume designer. He was nominated for an Academy Award in the category Best Costume Design for the film Milk (2008). He was nominated for an Emmy award for Outstanding Period Costumes for his work on Angelyne (2022).

He is a frequent collaborator of director Jason Reitman and has worked with him on Thank You for Smoking (2005), Up in the Air (2009), Ghostbusters: Afterlife (2021), and Saturday Night (2024), among other films. He has also collaborated with directors Gus Van Sant and Darren Aronofsky. Many of his projects have been set in the 1970s, including Milk, Saturday Night (2024), The Sympathizer (2024), and Being Heumann (2026). With his costume design choices, Glicker has helped bring to life on-screen characters based on iconic real-life figures, including Harvey Milk, Brian Wilson, Jack Kerouac, Lorne Michaels, and the disability rights activist Judith Heumann.

== Selected filmography ==
- Pretty Persuasion (2005)
- TransAmerica (2006)
- The Astronaut Farmer (2006)
- Milk (2008)
- Mother! (2017)
- Don't Worry. He Won't Go Far on Foot (2018)
- The Whale (2022)
- The Sympathizer (2024)
- Saturday Night (2024)
- Being Heumann (2026)
