= Louise Frogley =

British costume designer

- Born: 15 May 1947 (age 79); Surrey, England
- Occupation: Costume designer

Louise Frogley (born 15 May 1947 in Surrey) is a British costume designer with over sixty credits in film and television. She is best known for her work with Steven Soderbergh and George Clooney, and for designing costume for action and thriller movies, including Traffic (2000), Quantum of Solace (2008), and Iron Man 3 (2013).

== Early career ==
Louise Frogley started her career in film costume design in the 1980s, as assistant costume designer on Chariots of Fire (1981), working with renowned costume designer Milena Canonero. To find authentic running shorts for the character of Harold Abrahams, Frogley borrowed a pair of Edwardian shorts from Repton School, which were measured and reproduced by the costume makers. This was followed by her first solo design credit on Riding High (1981), a small-budget motorcycle action movie filmed in Essex.

Frogley designed the costumes for Neil Jordan's breakthrough film Mona Lisa (1986), dressing the heroine Simone, played by Cathy Tyson, in a series of fashionable designer outfits which reveal her profession as a high-end sex worker, in contrast to her driver Bob Hoskins, who wears an out-of-date suit 'in which he emerged from prison' at the start of the film.

== Soderbergh and Clooney collaborations ==
The Limey (1999) was Frogley's first collaboration with director Steven Soderbergh. She would go on to design costumes for many more of his films, including Traffic (2000), Good Night, and Good Luck (2005), Syriana (2005), The Good German (2006), Ocean's Thirteen (2007), Contagion (2011), and Free State of Jones (2016). These films mainly centre on male characters in professional contexts or conflict zones, and require precise, smart tailoring and uniform which communicates social status, rank and wealth. Soderbergh's frequent collaborators have been described as 'part-authors' of his films; this group includes Frogley as well as production designer Philip Messina and assistant director Gregory Jacobs.

George Clooney, who starred in the above films, brought Frogley in to design costumes on The Men who Stare at Goats (2009), which he produced, and his directorial projects Leatherheads (2008), The Ides of March (2011) and The Monuments Men (2014).

The costumes in political thriller The Ides of March were described as 'clean and classic single-breasted gray suits' by The Hollywood Reporter; and Frogley recognised that her work in the film was to create believable costume that never drew attention to itself. Nevertheless, the suits were custom-made for the actors and carefully designed to be modern and flattering.

Frogley's work on Second World War caper The Monuments Men mostly required accurate uniform for the male cast, but she was able to 'pile all the interesting clothing' onto Cate Blanchett, according to film costume commentators. A challenge for the main ensemble was finding accessories. Frogley explained, 'we had to find watches for every main actor, multiples for them. We had to do glasses, coated and uncoated. And sunglasses, coated and uncoated. For people with reading glasses, we had to do coated and uncoated, plus blank, coated and uncoated. It went on and on and on. We were driven mad with all of these details, but we did it.'

== Television work ==
Louise Frogley designed the costumes for the pilot episode of The Good Wife (2009).

== Other film work ==
Frogley's specialism in male-led action thriller films led to her involvement in Spy Game (2001), directed by Tony Scott and starring Robert Redford and Brad Pitt. The Scotsman's film reviewer credited Louise Frogley and the production and art designers of the film with 'the utterly convincing look of the movie', which included multiple flashbacks.

In 2008, Frogley took over the costume design for James Bond, for the film Quantum of Solace. This was Daniel Craig's second outing as Bond, and Frogley wanted to use a different tailor to establish him firmly as a different type of Bond, a suited hero. Tom Ford had dressed Daniel Craig before, and Frogley liked his style of aspirational tailoring. Looking back to the post-war publication context of Ian Fleming's books, Frogley wanted to create a luxurious wardrobe for 007 that represented international sophistication.

In 2014, Frogley worked with director Angelina Jolie on the film Unbroken, which told the story of Olympian and Prisoner of War camp survivor Louis Zamperini, played by Jack O'Connell. Frogley had seven weeks to prepare the costumes before shooting began, which she used to research the period and characters. Frogley noted that Jolie was 'very conscious of colour', which extended to locations and costumes: 'we never used green, we didn't use much blue... we used a lot of earth tones'. To give an 'endearing, charming' homemade feel to Zamperini's running clothes, the lettering was sewn by hand.

== Marvel Cinematic Universe ==
In 2013, Frogley was brought into the Marvel Cinematic Universe with the project Iron Man 3. Frogley returned to Marvel with costume design for Spiderman: Homecoming (2017) and Ant-man and the Wasp (2018). Frogley described the process of working on Ant-man as 'very technical', since the studio conceptualised the characters and then her job was to bring them to life.

The costumes in Spiderman: Homecoming were notable for their casual modernity, with young stars Zendaya and Tom Holland appearing in contemporary slogan and graphic t-shirts. Commentators pointed out that the t-shirts provided visual gags for the audience, and insight into the characters of Peter and MJ. Peter's shirts frequently had maths or science jokes on them - many were sourced from online brand Snorg - and MJ displays her intellectualism with a Sylvia Plath portrait t-shirt.

For the third Ant-man movie, Frogley re-interpreted the costume designed by Sammy Sheldon Differ for the previous two films, moving away from the vintage motorcycle style used before. The Wasp's costume - which was new for the film - required four months of research and development to perfect the shape and use of honeycomb-cut leather. Frogley referred to medieval armour to understand how to preserve upper-body mobility in the structured costume, and she worked with armour specialist Ivo Coveney on the construction of the suits and helmets.
