= Joseph G. Aulisi =

American costume designer

Joseph Garibaldi Aulisi, credited as Joseph G. Aulisi and Joe Aulisi, is a costume designer who works in theatre and in film. In theater, he has been nominated for two Drama Desk Awards for his work. In film, he has been nominated for two Emmy Awards and three Costume Designers Guild Awards.

== Theatrical work ==
Joseph G. Aulisi designed costumes for New York City productions as early as 1966. In 1966, he designed the costumes for The Ox Cart. The following year, he designed for The Wicked Cooks. Aulisi has designed costumes for Broadway theatre productions since 1968. His Broadway debut was with the original production of The Man in the Glass Booth. Since then, Aulisi has designed for more than 20 original broadway productions, including God's Favorite in 1974 and Rockabye Hamlet in 1976. In 1986, Aulisi was nominated for the Drama Desk Award for Outstanding Costume Design for his work on Precious Sons, but the award was given to Lindsay Davis for his designs for The Mystery of Edwin Drood. Aulisi was nominated for the same award in 1989, this time for his work on Rumors. The award was given to William Ivey Long for his work on Lend Me a Tenor. Aulisi's most recent Broadway production was Artist Descending a Staircase in 1989.

== Film work ==
Aulisi has designed costumes for films and television since as early as 1971. He began his film career that year with Shaft, a film that would later be remembered as one of the first films of the blaxploitation genre. Since then, he worked on more than 60 films and television productions, including Die Hard with a Vengeance in 1995, Bicentennial Man in 1999, and Charlie's Angels in 2000. Aulisi has been nominated for two Emmy Awards and three Costume Designers Guild Awards for his costume design work.
