= Consolata Boyle =

Irish costume designer based in Dublin

- Occupation: Costume Designer
- Years active: 1984–present
- Spouse: Donald Taylor Black

Consolata Boyle is an Irish costume designer based in Dublin. She is a frequent collaborator of English director Stephen Frears and has been nominated three times for the Academy Award for Best Costume Design for her work on three of his films: The Queen (2006), Florence Foster Jenkins (2016) and Victoria & Abdul (2017).

== Early life ==
Consolata Boyle (born 23rd May 1949,) attended Holy Child Killiney secondary school, County Dublin, Ireland. She graduated from University College Dublin with BA in Archaeology and History, in 1972. During that time she was involved in the university society Dramsoc, she trained in costume design at the Abbey Theatre and began her career in the early 1980s. She obtained a degree in textile design and the reconstruction of historical textiles. She also did a postgraduate diploma in textiles at West Surrey College of Art & Design (now University for the Creative Arts).

== Main works ==
Her many credits include Anne Devlin (1984), December Bride (1991), Into the West (1992), Widows' Peak (1994), Angela's Ashes (1999), Nora (2000), When Brendan Met Trudy (2001), The Iron Lady (2011), Miss Julie (2014), and Enola Holmes 1 (2020), and Enola Holmes 2 (2022). Her collaboration with Stephen Frears began with The Snapper in 1993 and continued with films including Mary Reilly (1996), The Queen (2006), with Helen Mirren, Cheri (2009), Tamara Drewe (2010), with Gemma Arterton, Philomena (2013), Florence Foster Jenkins (2016), and Victoria & Abdul (2017).

She worked with Kit Harington and Alicia Vikander on the war-time costume design for Testament of Youth (2014). She worked with Antonio Banderas on costume for the Spanish film Altamira (2016).

== Achievements ==
Boyle has thrice been nominated for the Academy Award for Best Costume Design for her work on three of his films: The Queen (2006), Florence Foster Jenkins (2016) and Victoria & Abdul (2017).

Boyle has been nominated for several other awards throughout her career as a costume designer and amongst those that she has won are an Emmy Award for the television film The Lion in Winter (2003), a Costume Designers Guild Award for The Queen (2006) and four Irish Film and Television Awards for The Queen (2006), Chéri (2009), The Iron Lady (2011) and Philomena (2013).

Consolata Boyle was the recipient of the UCD Alumni Award 2022 for Arts & Humanities.

== Personal life ==
She is married to documentary filmmaker Donald Taylor Black.
