= Costume Designers Guild Career Achievement Award =

Career Achievement Award
- Awarded for: an extraordinary individual whose remarkable career in costume design has left an indelible mark on the worlds of film and television.
- Country: United States
- Presented by: Costume Designers Guild
- First award: 1998
- Website: costumedesignersguild.com

The Costume Designers Guild Career Achievement Award is awarded to an individual whose career in costume design has been deemed to have left an indelible mark on the worlds of film and television.

The award was established in 1998 and was first presented at the 1st Costume Designers Guild Awards, in February 1999. Initially known as The Rit Color Award for Achievement in Costume Design, as well as the BVLGARI and LACOSTE Career Achievement Awards in both film and television.

== Recipients ==
| Year | Recipient | Award | Ref |
|---|---|---|---|
| 1998 | Albert Wolsky | Career Achievement in Film | |
| 1998 | Bob Mackie | The Rit Color Award for Achievement in Costume Design | |
| 1999 | Theoni V. Aldredge | Career Achievement in Film | |
| 1999 | Anthony Powell | Career Achievement in Film | |
| 1999 | Nolan Miller | Rit Color Career Achievement in Television | |
| 2000 | Milena Canonero | Career Achievement in Film | |
| 2000 | Bill Hargate | Rit Color Career Achievement for Television | |
| 2001 | Theadora Van Runkle | BVLGARI Career Achievement in Film | |
| 2001 | Ret Turner | Rit Color Career Achievement for Television | |
| 2002 | Ann Roth | BVLGARI Career Achievement in Film | |
| 2002 | Rita Riggs | Career Achievement in Television | |
| 2003 | James Acheson | Career Achievement in Film | |
| 2003 | Noel Taylor | Career Achievement in Television | |
| 2004 | Anthea Sylbert | LACOSTE Career Achievement in Film | |
| 2004 | Robert Fletcher | Lancel Career Achievement in Television | |
| 2005 | Colleen Atwood | LACOSTE Spotlight in Film | |
| 2005 | Robert Blackman | Spotlight in Television | |
| 2006 | Patricia Norris | LACOSTE Career Achievement in Film | |
| 2006 | Grady Hunt | Career Achievement in Television | |
| 2007 | Ruth Myers | LACOSTE Career Achievement in Film | |
| 2007 | Ray Aghayan | Career Achievement in Television | |
| 2008 | Marilyn Vance | LACOSTE Career Achievement in Film | |
| 2008 | Van Broughton Ramsey | Career Achievement in Television | |
| 2009 | Sandy Powell | LACOSTE Career Achievement in Film | |
| 2009 | Michael Travis | Career Achievement in Television | |
| 2010 | Julie Weiss | Disaronno Career Achievement in Film & Television | |
| 2011 | Marlene Stewart | Career Achievement in Film | |
| 2011 | Lou Eyrich | Career Achievement in Television | |
| 2012 | Judianna Makovsky | Career Achievement in Film | |
| 2012 | Eduardo Castro | Career Achievement in Television | |
| 2013 | April Ferry | Career Achievement | |
| 2014 | Aggie Guerard Rodgers | Career Achievement | |
| 2015 | Ellen Mirojnick | Career Achievement | |
| 2016 | Jeffrey Kurland | Career Achievement | |
| 2017 | Joanna Johnston | Career Achievement | |
| 2018 | Ruth E. Carter | Career Achievement | |
| 2019 | Michael Kaplan | Career Achievement | |
| 2021 | Sharen Davis | Career Achievement | |
| 2022 | Deborah Lynn Scott | Career Achievement | |
| 2023 | Francine Jamison-Tanchuck | Career Achievement | |
| 2024 | Jenny Beavan | Career Achievement | |
| 2025 | Michelle Cole | Career Achievement | |
