= Costume Designers Guild Award for Excellence in Period/Fantasy Film =

Discontinued CDG film award

The Costume Designers Guild Award for Excellence in Period/Fantasy Film was presented annually by the Costume Designers Guild from 1999 to 2004.

In 1998, the Guild introduced a single award category titled Excellence in Film, in which all films competed regardless of genre. Among the inaugural nominees, three were period dramas, while two, including the winner, Pleasantville, were fantasy films. Beginning with the 1999 ceremony, the Guild divided the award into two categories: Excellence in Contemporary Film and Excellence in Period/Fantasy Film. In 2005, the latter was further separated into two distinct categories: Excellence in Period Film and Excellence in Fantasy Film, each recognizing achievement within its respective genre.

== Winners and nominees ==
=== 1990s ===
Excellence in Film

Year	Film	Costume Designer(s)	Ref.
1998	Pleasantville	Judianna Makovsky	
1998	Beloved	Colleen Atwood	
1998	The Man in the Iron Mask	James Acheson	
1998	The Mask of Zorro	Graciela Mazón	
1998	The Truman Show	Marilyn Matthews	

Excellence in Period/Fantasy Film

Year	Film	Costume Designer(s)	Ref.
1999	Sleepy Hollow	Colleen Atwood	
1999	Austin Powers: The Spy Who Shagged Me	Deena Appel	
1999	The Matrix	Kym Barrett	
1999	The Talented Mr. Ripley	Ann Roth and Gary Jones	

=== 2000s ===
Year	Film	Costume Designer(s)	Ref.
2000	Dr. Seuss' How the Grinch Stole Christmas	Rita Ryack	
2000	Almost Famous	Betsy Heimann	
2000	Chocolat	Renee Ehrlich Kalfus	
2000	Quills	Jacqueline West	
2001	Harry Potter and the Sorcerer's Stone	Judianna Makovsky	
2001	Blow	Mark Bridges	
2001	Hedwig and the Angry Inch	Arianne Phillips	
2001	Planet of the Apes	Colleen Atwood	
2002	Chicago	Colleen Atwood	
2002	Frida	Julie Weiss	
2002	The Lord of the Rings: The Two Towers	Ngila Dickson	
2002	Road to Perdition	Albert Wolsky	
2003	The Lord of the Rings: The Return of the King	Ngila Dickson	
2003	The Last Samurai	Ngila Dickson	
2003	Pirates of the Caribbean: The Curse of the Black Pearl	Penny Rose	
2003	Seabiscuit	Judianna Makovsky	
2004	Lemony Snicket's A Series of Unfortunate Events	Colleen Atwood	
2004	The Aviator	Sandy Powell	
2004	De-Lovely	Janty Yates	
2004	The Phantom of the Opera	Alexandra Byrne	
2004	Ray	Sharen Davis	

== Multiple wins and nominations ==
This total includes wins and nominations for Excellence in Film

=== Multiple wins ===
Wins	Costume designer
3	Colleen Atwood
2	Judianna Makovsky

=== Multiple nominations ===
Nominations	Costume designer
5	Colleen Atwood
3	Ngila Dickson
3	Judianna Makovsky
