= Sandy Powell (costume designer) =

British costume designer (born 1960)

Sandy Powell CBE
- Powell at the 2026 BFI London Film Festival
- Born: 7 April 1960 (age 66); London, England
- Education: Central School of Art
- Occupation: Costume designer
- Years active: 1985–present

Sandy Powell CBE RDI (born 7 April 1960) is a British costume designer. She has received numerous accolades, including three Academy Awards, three BAFTA Film Awards, and two Costume Designers Guild Awards. She has been honored with the Costume Designers Guild Career Achievement Award in 2010 and the BAFTA Fellowship in 2023. Powell was appointed Commander of the Order of the British Empire (CBE) in 2025.

Powell frequently collaborated with directors Derek Jarman, Neil Jordan, Todd Haynes and Martin Scorsese. She has received 15 nominations for the Academy Award for Best Costume Design and has won three times for Shakespeare in Love (1998), The Aviator (2004), and The Young Victoria (2009). She has also been nominated for the BAFTA Award for Best Costume Design a record 16 times and had three wins for Velvet Goldmine (1998), The Young Victoria, and The Favourite (2018).

== Early life and education ==
Powell was born in London in 1960, and grew up in Brixton and Clapham. Her father worked in casinos, while her mother was a secretary. In 2023, Powell said in an interview with fashion journalist Suzy Menkes that, despite their close friendship, she was not related to fellow costume designer Anthony Powell. Information about them being cousins has falsely spread online. Powell learned to sew from her mother on a Singer sewing machine, drew pictures of clothes, designed and made outfits for her dolls, and started making her own clothes from a young age. She also developed an interest in film and theatre from an early age.

Powell attended Sydenham High School, and in 1978 she completed an art foundation course at Saint Martin's School of Art, where she became acquainted with Lea Anderson, who later became a dancer and choreographer as well as Powell's collaborator. In 1979, Powell began a BA in theatre design at the Central School of Art and Design, but left after two years before completing her degree and started working for fringe theatre companies.

== Career ==
=== 1980–1997: Early work ===
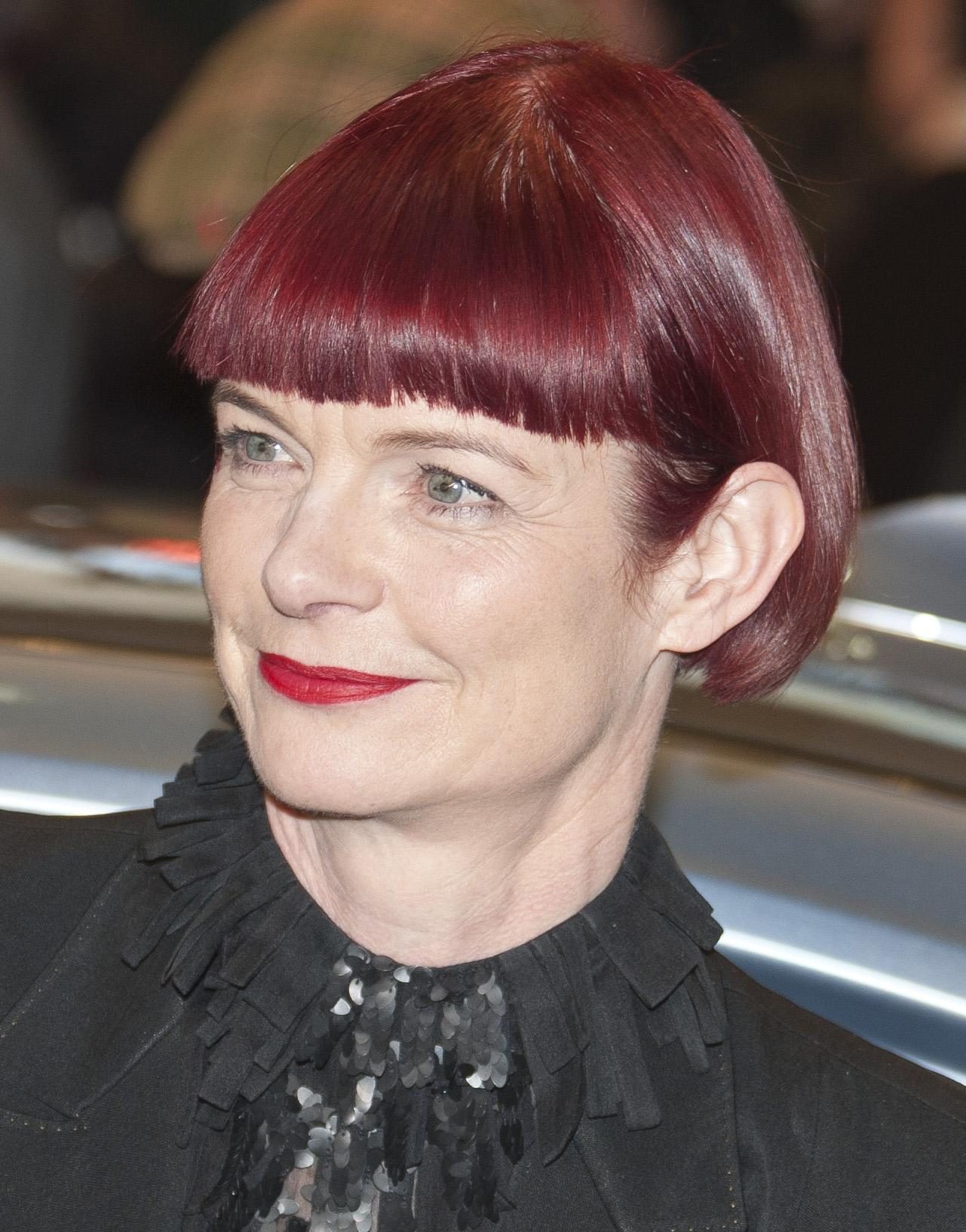
Powell at the 61st Berlin International Film Festival (2011)

After leaving Central, Powell began a working relationship with dancer and choreographer Lindsay Kemp, whom she greatly admired. She designed costumes for his productions, the first of which was the show Nijinsky at La Scala in Milan. In the early 1980s, Powell became acquainted with filmmaker Derek Jarman, who became a mentor and an influential figure in her life. Following Jarman's advice, she spent a year working on music videos. She made her entry into the film industry in 1986, designing costumes for the Jarman film Caravaggio.

In 1992, Powell achieved prominence in the period drama film Orlando, directed by Sally Potter. Operating on a limited budget, Powell created elaborate costumes for the gender-switching and time-traveling protagonist (played by Tilda Swinton), for which she received her first Academy Award nomination for Best Costume Design. Powell also began a collaboration with director Neil Jordan, which would produce a total of six films including the crime thriller The Crying Game (1992), the gothic horror film Interview with the Vampire (1994) and the period drama Michael Collins (1996).

=== 1998–2017: Breakthrough ===
Powell received dual nominations at the 71st Academy Awards for her two 1998 films, Velvet Goldmine and Shakespeare in Love. Echoing the contemporary tone of Shakespeare in Love, Powell opted to sacrifice historical accuracy in her costume designs but still managed to achieve "emotional accuracy", according to Salon critic Stephanie Zacharek. The detail on the costumes of Gwyneth Paltrow's Viola and the thematic significance of her costume changes were also noted as highlights of the film. For her work in the film, Powell won her first Academy Award for Best Costume Design.

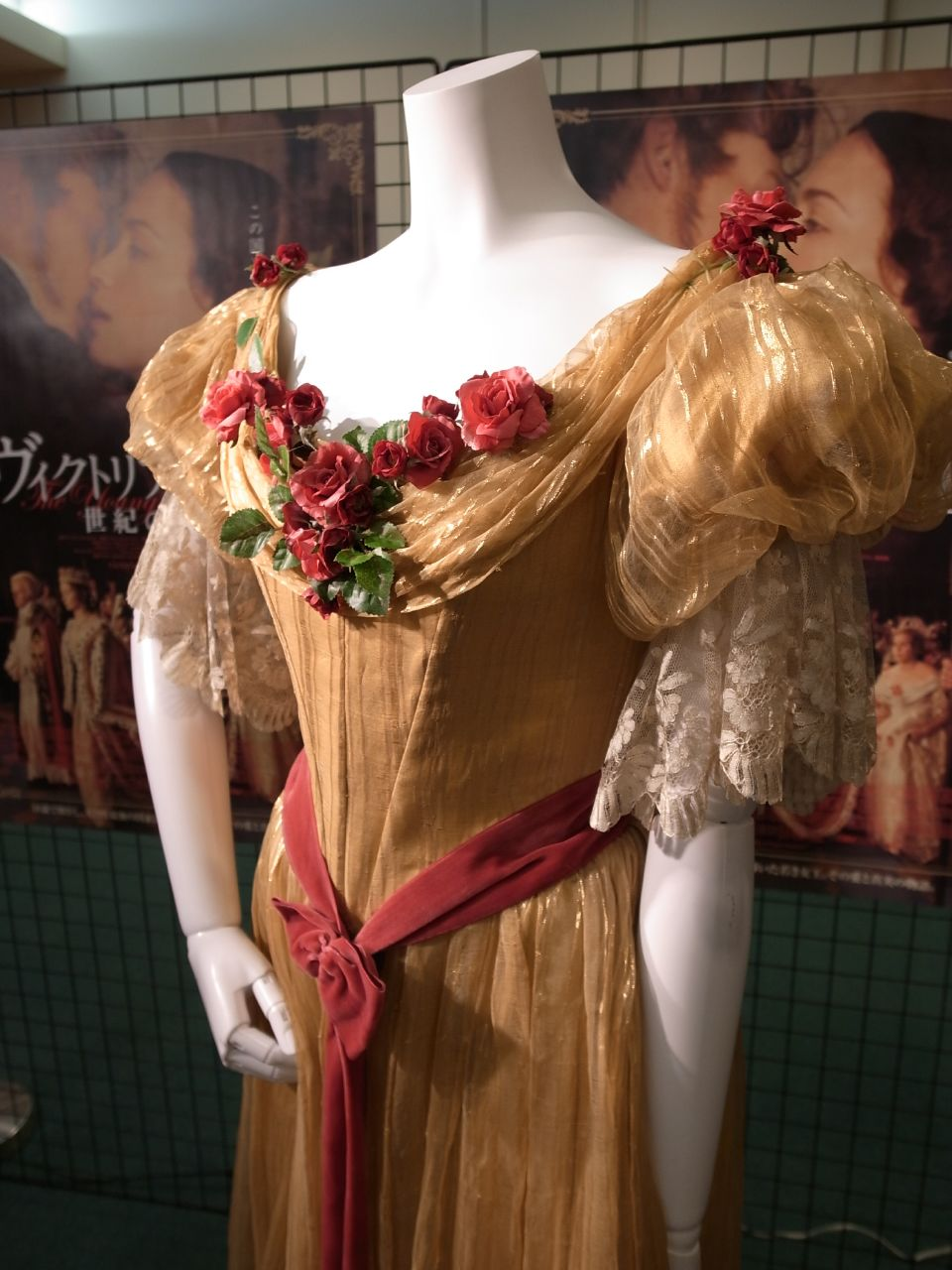
Costume worn by Emily Blunt in The Young Victoria, designed by Powell.

Following her win at the 71st Academy Awards, Powell began her collaboration with director Martin Scorsese, starting with his 2002 epic period drama film Gangs of New York, for which she earned her 5th Oscar nomination. The two reunited for the 2004 biographical drama film The Aviator, for which Powell won her second Academy Award. Powell accepted her Oscar while wearing a dress made by her frequent collaborator, the costume cutter Annie Hadley, which was a version of a dress worn by Cate Blanchett in the film.

In 2005 she worked on Stephen Frears' Mrs Henderson Presents earning another Academy Award nomination. She worked on Scorsese gain this time for a film set in modern-day creating current day clothing for the Boston crime drama The Departed (2006) starring Leonardo DiCaprio, Matt Damon, and Jack Nicholson. She then worked on the historical romantic drama The Other Boleyn Girl which was based on 2001 novel of the same name by Philippa Gregory. The film was directed by Justin Chadwick and starred Scarlett Johansson, Natalie Portman, and Eric Bana.

In 2009, She worked on the romantic period drama The Young Victoria directed by Jean-Marc Vallée. The film starred Emily Blunt as Queen Victoria, and the film revolves around her upbringing and romance with Prince Albert of Saxe-Coburg and Gotha portrayed by Rupert Friend. She won her third Academy Award for Best Costume Design, and a BAFTA Award for Best Costume Design for her work on the film. The following year she worked on Scorsese's psychological thriller Shutter Island starring Leonardo DiCaprio and Julie Taymor's The Tempest with Helen Mirren. In 2011 she was nominated for the Academy Award for Best Costume Design her work on Scorsese's children's action adventure film Hugo losing to Mark Bridges for The Artist (2011).

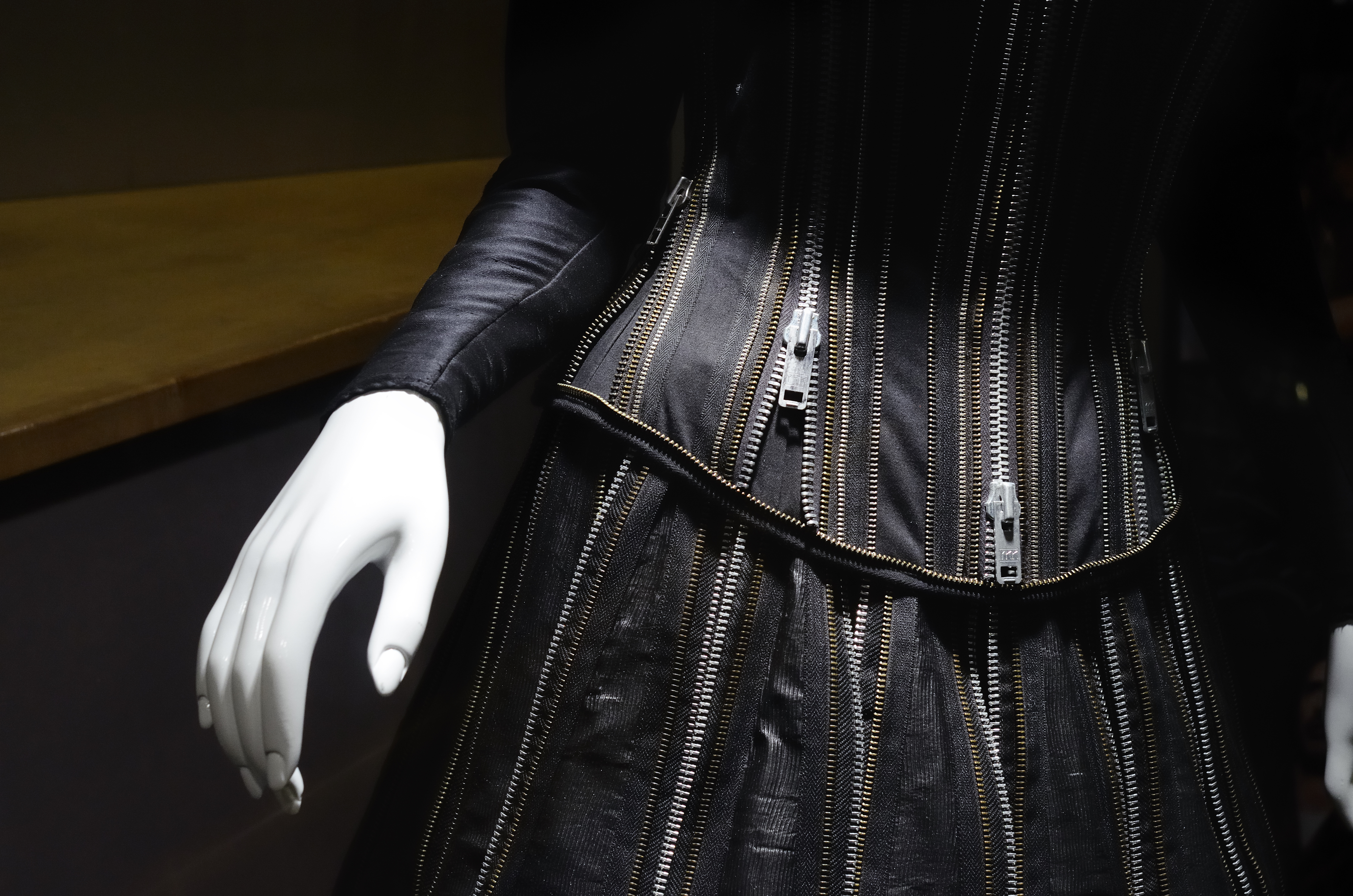
Detail of the costume worn by Helen Mirren in The Tempest, designed by Powell.

In 2016, Powell received her second dual nominations at the 88th Academy Awards, having been recognized for her works in Kenneth Branagh's Disney live-action adaptation of Cinderella and for Todd Haynes' romantic drama Carol (2015). The later was based on the Patricia Highsmith novel The Price of Salt (1952). The film starred Cate Blanchett and Rooney Mara as starcrossed lovers in the 1950s. She reunited with Haynes for the black and white film Wonderstruck (2017) starring Julianne Moore and Michelle Williams, based on the 2011 novel of the same name by Brian Selznick. She also served as an executive producer on the film. That same year, she worked on the John Cameron Mitchell's wacky science fiction romantic comedy How to Talk to Girls at Parties (2017).

=== 2018–present ===
In 2019, Powell garnered her third dual nominations at the 91st Academy Awards for her works in Yorgos Lanthimos' The Favourite (2018) and Rob Marshall's Mary Poppins Returns (2018), making her the most nominated costume designer in Academy Awards history after Edith Head. In 2020, Powell received her 15th Oscar nomination in her seventh collaboration with Martin Scorsese in his epic crime film The Irishman starring Robert De Niro, Al Pacino, and Joe Pesci. She shared the nomination with her co-designer, Christopher Peterson.

In the same year, Powell collected many stars' signatures on a cream calico suit in a widely publicized tour of 2020 awards ceremonies, including the 92nd Academy Awards and 73rd British Academy Film Awards, to be auctioned to raise funds for the preservation of director Derek Jarman's home, Prospect Cottage. She also did the costume design for the British drama Living (2021) starring Bill Nighy and the live action Disney film Snow White starring Rachel Zegler.

== Filmography ==
Year	Title	Director	Notes
1986	Caravaggio	Derek Jarman	
1987	Aria	Derek Jarman	Segment: "Depuis le jour"
1987	The Last of England	Derek Jarman	
1988	Stormy Monday	Mike Figgis	
1988	For Queen and Country	Martin Stellman	
1989	Venus Peter	Ian Sellar	
1989	Killing Dad	Michael Austin	
1989	Shadow of China	Mitsuo Yanagimachi	
1991	The Miracle	Neil Jordan	
1991	The Pope Must Die	Peter Richardson	
1991	Edward II	Derek Jarman	Also makes a cameo as Seamstress
1992	Orlando	Sally Potter	
1992	The Crying Game	Neil Jordan	
1993	Wittgenstein	Derek Jarman	
1994	Being Human	Bill Forsyth	
1994	Interview with the Vampire	Neil Jordan	
1995	Rob Roy	Michael Caton-Jones	
1996	Michael Collins	Neil Jordan	
1997	The Butcher Boy	Neil Jordan	
1997	The Wings of the Dove	Iain Softley	
1998	Velvet Goldmine	Todd Haynes	
1998	Hilary and Jackie	Anand Tucker	
1998	Shakespeare in Love	John Madden	
1999	Felicia's Journey	Atom Egoyan	
1999	Miss Julie	Mike Figgis	
1999	The End of the Affair	Neil Jordan	
2002	Far from Heaven	Todd Haynes	
2002	Gangs of New York	Martin Scorsese	
2003	Sylvia	Christine Jeffs	
2004	The Aviator	Martin Scorsese	
2005	Mrs Henderson Presents	Stephen Frears	
2006	The Departed	Martin Scorsese	
2008	The Other Boleyn Girl	Justin Chadwick	
2009	The Young Victoria	Jean-Marc Vallée	
2010	Shutter Island	Martin Scorsese	
2010	The Tempest	Julie Taymor	
2011	Hugo	Martin Scorsese	
2012	Suspension of Disbelief	Mike Figgis	
2013	The Wolf of Wall Street	Martin Scorsese	
2015	Cinderella	Kenneth Branagh	
2015	Carol	Todd Haynes	
2017	Wonderstruck	Todd Haynes	Also executive producer
2017	How to Talk to Girls at Parties	John Cameron Mitchell	
2018	The Favourite	Yorgos Lanthimos	
2018	Mary Poppins Returns	Rob Marshall	
2019	The Irishman	Martin Scorsese	with Christopher Peterson
2020	The Glorias	Julie Taymor	
2021	Mothering Sunday	Eva Husson	
2022	Living	Oliver Hermanus	
2025	Snow White	Marc Webb	
2026	The Bride!	Maggie Gyllenhaal	
2026	Queer Edward II	Theo Rollason	Documentary; Executive producer
TBA	My Duchess †	Mike Newell	Post-production
TBA	What Happens at Night †	Martin Scorsese	Post-production

Key
†	Denotes films that have not yet been released

== Theatre ==
Year	Production	Venue	Notes
1990	Edward II	Royal Shakespeare Company	
1998	Rigoletto	De Nederlandse Opera	
1998	Doctor Ox's Experiment	English National Opera	Commissioned by the ENO with BBC Television
2024	Gatsby: An American Myth	American Repertory Theater	

== Awards and nominations ==
Major associations

Academy Awards

Year	Category	Nominated work	Result	Ref.
1994	Best Costume Design	Orlando	Nominated	
1998	Best Costume Design	The Wings of the Dove	Nominated	
1999	Best Costume Design	Shakespeare in Love	Won	
1999	Best Costume Design	Velvet Goldmine	Nominated	
2003	Best Costume Design	Gangs of New York	Nominated	
2005	Best Costume Design	The Aviator	Won	
2006	Best Costume Design	Mrs Henderson Presents	Nominated	
2010	Best Costume Design	The Young Victoria	Won	
2011	Best Costume Design	The Tempest	Nominated	
2012	Best Costume Design	Hugo	Nominated	
2016	Best Costume Design	Carol	Nominated	
2016	Best Costume Design	Cinderella	Nominated	
2019	Best Costume Design	The Favourite	Nominated	
2019	Best Costume Design	Mary Poppins Returns	Nominated	
2020	Best Costume Design	The Irishman	Nominated	

BAFTA Awards

Year	Category	Nominated work	Result	Ref.
British Academy Film Awards
1994	Best Costume Design	Orlando	Nominated	
1995	Best Costume Design	Interview with the Vampire	Nominated	
1998	Best Costume Design	The Wings of the Dove	Nominated	
1999	Best Costume Design	Velvet Goldmine	Won	
1999	Best Costume Design	Shakespeare in Love	Nominated	
2000	Best Costume Design	The End of the Affair	Nominated	
2003	Best Costume Design	Gangs of New York	Nominated	
2005	Best Costume Design	The Aviator	Nominated	
2006	Best Costume Design	Mrs Henderson Presents	Nominated	
2010	Best Costume Design	The Young Victoria	Won	
2012	Best Costume Design	Hugo	Nominated	
2016	Best Costume Design	Carol	Nominated	
2016	Best Costume Design	Cinderella	Nominated	
2019	Best Costume Design	The Favourite	Won	
2019	Best Costume Design	Mary Poppins Returns	Nominated	
2020	Best Costume Design	The Irishman	Nominated	
2023	BAFTA Fellowship	—N/a	Honored	

Miscellaneous awards

List of Sandy Powell other awards and nominations
Award	Year (Note: Indicates the year of ceremony. Each year is linked to the article about the awards held that year, wherever possible.)	Category	Title	Result	Ref.
Apolo Awards	2017	Best Costume Design	Carol	Nominated	
Apolo Awards	2020	Best Costume Design	The Favourite	Won	
British Independent Film Awards	2005	Best Technical Achievement	Mrs Henderson Presents	Nominated	
British Independent Film Awards	2017	Best Costume Design	How to Talk to Girls at Parties	Nominated	
British Independent Film Awards	2018	Best Costume Design	The Favourite	Won	
British Independent Film Awards	2022	Best Costume Design	Living	Nominated	
Camerimage	2015	Costume Designer with Unique Visual Sensitivity	—N/a	Honored	
Capri Hollywood International Film Festival	2002	Capri Umberto Tirelli Award	Gangs of New York	Won	
Capri Hollywood International Film Festival	2016	Best Costume Design	Cinderella	Won	
Capri Hollywood International Film Festival	2016	Capri Legend Award	—N/a	Honored	
Capri Hollywood International Film Festival	2019	Best Costume Design	Mary Poppins Returns	Won	
Costume Designers Guild Awards	2005	Excellence in Period/Fantasy Film	The Aviator	Nominated	
Costume Designers Guild Awards	2010	Excellence in Period Film	The Young Victoria	Won	
Costume Designers Guild Awards	2010	Career Achievement Award	—N/a	Honored	
Costume Designers Guild Awards	2011	Excellence in Fantasy Film	The Tempest	Nominated	
Costume Designers Guild Awards	2012	Excellence in Period Film	Hugo	Nominated	
Costume Designers Guild Awards	2016	Excellence in Fantasy Film	Cinderella	Nominated	
Costume Designers Guild Awards	2016	Excellence in Period Film	Carol	Nominated	
Costume Designers Guild Awards	2019	Excellence in Period Film	The Favourite	Won	
Costume Designers Guild Awards	2019	Excellence in Period Film	Mary Poppins Returns	Nominated	
Critics' Choice Awards	2010	Best Costume Design	The Young Victoria	Won	
Critics' Choice Awards	2012	Best Costume Design	Hugo	Nominated	
Critics' Choice Awards	2016	Best Costume Design	Carol	Nominated	
Critics' Choice Awards	2016	Best Costume Design	Cinderella	Nominated	
Critics' Choice Awards	2019	Best Costume Design	The Favourite	Nominated	
Critics' Choice Awards	2019	Best Costume Design	Mary Poppins Returns	Nominated	
Critics' Choice Awards	2020	Best Costume Design	The Irishman	Nominated	
Empire Awards	2016	Best Costume Design	Carol	Nominated	
Empire Awards	2016	Best Costume Design	Cinderella	Nominated	
European Film Awards	2019	Best Costume Designer	The Favourite	Won	
Evening Standard British Film Awards	1992	Technical Achievement	Edward II, The Miracle and The Pope Must Die	Won	
Evening Standard British Film Awards	1994	Technical Achievement	Orlando	Won (Note: Tied with Stuart Craig for The Secret Garden)	
Fangoria Chainsaw Awards	2026	Best Costume Design	The Bride!	Nominated	
Genie Awards (Note: succeeded the Canadian Film Awards (1949–78) and were merged with the Gemini Awards in 2013 to form the Canadian Screen Awards)	2000	Best Costume Design	Felicia's Journey	Nominated	
Hollywood Film Awards	2015	Hollywood Costume Design Award	Cinderella	Won	
Hollywood Film Awards	2018	Hollywood Costume Design Award	The Favourite	Won	
Las Vegas Film Critics Society Awards	2002	Best Costume Design	Far from Heaven	Nominated	
Las Vegas Film Critics Society Awards	2002	Best Costume Design	Gangs of New York	Nominated	
Las Vegas Film Critics Society Awards	2005	Best Costume Design	The Aviator	Won	
Las Vegas Film Critics Society Awards	2018	Best Costume Design	The Favourite	Won	
London Design Festival	2022	London Design Medal	—N/a	Honored	
London Film Critics' Circle Awards	2016	Technical Achievement Award	Cinderella	Nominated	
London Film Critics' Circle Awards	2020	Dilys Powell Award for Excellence in Film	—N/a	Honored	
Online Film Critics Society Awards	2003	Best Costume Design	Far from Heaven	Won	
Online Film Critics Society Awards	2003	Best Costume Design	Gangs of New York	Nominated	
Phoenix Film Critics Society Awards	2003	Best Costume Design	Far from Heaven	Nominated	
Phoenix Film Critics Society Awards	2003	Best Costume Design	Gangs of New York	Nominated	
Phoenix Film Critics Society Awards	2004	Best Costume Design	The Aviator	Won	
Phoenix Film Critics Society Awards	2009	Best Costume Design	The Young Victoria	Won	
Phoenix Film Critics Society Awards	2011	Best Costume Design	Hugo	Nominated	
Phoenix Film Critics Society Awards	2015	Best Costume Design	Cinderella	Nominated	
Phoenix Film Critics Society Awards	2018	Best Costume Design	The Favourite	Won	
SCAD Savannah Film Festival	2021	Variety’s Creative Impact in Costume Design	—N/a	Honored	
San Diego Film Critics Society Awards	2018	Best Costume Design	The Favourite	Won	
Santa Barbara International Film Festival	2020	Variety Artisans Award	The Irishman	Won	
Satellite Awards	1998	Best Costume Design	The Wings of the Dove	Nominated	
Satellite Awards	1999	Best Costume Design	Shakespeare in Love	Nominated	
Satellite Awards	2003	Best Costume Design	Gangs of New York	Nominated	
Satellite Awards	2005	Best Costume Design	The Aviator	Nominated	
Satellite Awards	2009	Best Costume Design	The Young Victoria	Nominated	
Satellite Awards	2016	Best Costume Design	Cinderella	Nominated	
Satellite Awards	2019	Best Costume Design	The Favourite	Won	
Satellite Awards	2023	Best Costume Design	Living	Nominated	
Saturn Awards	1995	Best Costume Design	Interview with the Vampire	Won	
Saturn Awards	2012	Best Costume Design	Hugo	Nominated	
Saturn Awards	2016	Best Costume Design	Cinderella	Nominated	
Saturn Awards	2019	Best Costume Design	Mary Poppins Returns	Nominated	
Seattle Film Critics Society Awards (Note: prior to the SFCS formal establishment in 2016, a group of Seattle-area critics compiled the Seattle Film Critics Awards in 2014 and 2015.)	2016	Best Costume Design	Carol	Nominated	
Seattle Film Critics Society Awards	2016	Best Costume Design	Cinderella	Nominated	
Seattle Film Critics Society Awards	2018	Best Costume Design	The Favourite	Nominated	
Seattle Film Critics Society Awards	2018	Best Costume Design	Mary Poppins Returns	Nominated	
WFTV Awards	2005	AFM Lighting Craft Award	—N/a	Won	

Honorary degrees

Name of school, year given, and name of degree
School	Year	Degree	Ref.
University of the Arts London	2018	Honorary Fellow	

== Other honours ==
- Powell was appointed an Officer of the Order of the British Empire (OBE) in the 2011 New Year Honours for services to the film industry. She was promoted to Commander (CBE) in the 2025 New Year Honours for services to costume design.
- Powell was made a Royal Designer for Industry (RDI) by the Royal Society of Arts in 2013.
