= Pleasantville (film) =

1998 film by Gary Ross

- Theatrical release poster
- Directed by: Gary Ross
- Written by: Gary Ross
- Produced by: Jon Kilik; Robert J. Degus; Steven Soderbergh; Gary Ross
- Starring: Tobey Maguire; Jeff Daniels; Joan Allen; William H. Macy; J. T. Walsh; Don Knotts; Reese Witherspoon
- Cinematography: John Lindley
- Edited by: William Goldenberg
- Music by: Randy Newman
- Production company: Larger Than Life Productions
- Distributed by: New Line Cinema
- Release date: October 23, 1998
- Running time: 124 minutes
- Country: United States
- Language: English
- Budget: $60 million
- Box office: $49.8 million

Pleasantville is a 1998 American teen fantasy comedy-drama film written, co-produced, and directed by Gary Ross (in his directorial debut). It stars Tobey Maguire, Jeff Daniels, Joan Allen, William H. Macy, J. T. Walsh, and Reese Witherspoon, with Don Knotts, Paul Walker, Marley Shelton, and Jane Kaczmarek in supporting roles.

The story centers on twin siblings, David and Jennifer, who wind up trapped in a 1950s television show, set in a small Midwest town, where everything and everyone are seemingly perfect.

The film was released by New Line Cinema on October 23, 1998, and was a box-office failure, earning a total of $49.8 million against a $60 million budget. Despite this, the film received generally positive reviews from critics, and it received three nominations at the 71st Academy Awards. It was one of J. T. Walsh's final performances and was dedicated to his memory. It was also the final on-screen film appearance of Don Knotts, who would subsequently take on voice acting roles until his death.

== Plot ==
In 1998, while their divorced mother leaves to go out of town, high-school-aged twin siblings David and Jennifer fight over the television, breaking the remote control. A mysterious TV repairman suddenly arrives and, impressed by David's knowledge and love of Pleasantville, a black-and-white 1950s sitcom about the idyllic Parker family, gives him an unusual remote control before departing.

When they use it, David and Jennifer are magically transported into the Parkers' house, in Pleasantville's black-and-white world. Unaware of the replacements, George and Betty Parker believe David and Jennifer to be their children, Bud and Mary Sue. Communicating through the Parkers' television, David tries to reason with the repairman, who is offended that they want to come home, thinking they should be lucky to live in Pleasantville.

There, fire is impossible to start (firefighters merely rescue cats from trees), and everyone is unaware that anything exists outside of Pleasantville, as all roads circle back into it. David tells Jennifer they must play the show's characters and not disrupt Pleasantville, but she rebelliously goes on a date with Mary Sue's boyfriend, Skip Martin, the most popular boy in school. She has sex with Skip, who is shocked by the experience, which leads to the first bursts of color appearing in town.

Bill Johnson, owner of the malt shop where Bud works, experiences an existential crisis after realizing the repetitive nature of his life. David tries to help him break out of his routine and notices an attraction between Bill and Betty.

As Jennifer influences other teenagers, parts of Pleasantville become colorized, including some of the residents. Books in the library, previously blank, begin to fill with words as David and Jennifer summarize the plot to their classmates. After Jennifer tells a curious Betty about sex and masturbation, Betty masturbates in the bathtub and has an orgasm that results in her colorization and a fire in the tree in their yard. David puts out the fire with the firetruck's hose because the firemen did not know what the hose was for.

David shows Bill a book of modern art, which inspires him to begin painting and to pursue a romance with Betty. Jennifer loses interest in sex and partying and becomes colorized after finding passion in literature. David pursues a romance with a classmate, Margaret, but is dismayed to find he is still black and white.

Betty leaves George to be with Bill, leaving George bewildered. The town leaders, including the mayor Big Bob and others who remain black and white, are suspicious of the recent changes and begin to discriminate against the "colored" people, considering them a threat to Pleasantville's values. A riot is ignited by Bill's nude painting of Betty on the window of his malt shop. The shop is destroyed, books are burned and colored people are harassed in the street. David defends Betty from a gang of teenage boys, demonstrating newfound courage that turns him colored.

The town council establishes a code of conduct that, among other things, bans colored citizens from public venues. It also outlaws reading, rock music and using colorful paint. In protest, David and Bill paint a colorful mural outside the soda fountain depicting the beauty of love, sex, music and literature.

The two are arrested and brought to trial in front of the entire town. As David helps George realize how much he misses Betty, George becomes colorized along with everyone else in the courtroom, except for Big Bob, who refuses to change his ways. After David enrages him by suggesting that women may end up going to work while men stay home to cook and clean, Big Bob finally turns colorful before fleeing in shame with the entire courtroom laughing.

As the entire town becomes colorized, color television sets start being sold, broadcasting footage of other countries, and the town's roads now lead to other cities. Jennifer chooses to stay behind to attend college in neighboring Springfield. Bidding farewell to her, Margaret, and Betty, while also promising to return whenever he can, David uses the remote control to return to the real world.

There, only an hour has passed since David's disappearance. He finds his mother crying in the kitchen, lamenting that her life has not turned out the way she expected; he assures her that nothing has to be perfect. In Pleasantville, the citizens and Jennifer enjoy their lives.

== Cast ==
- Tobey Maguire as David / Bud Parker
  - Kevin Connors as the real Bud Parker
- Jeff Daniels as Bill Johnson, owner of the malt shop, David/Bud's boss
- Joan Allen as Betty Parker, Bud and Mary Sue's mother
- William H. Macy as George Parker, Bud and Mary Sue's father
- J. T. Walsh as Bob "Big Bob", mayor of Pleasantville
- Don Knotts as TV repairman
- Marley Shelton as Margaret Henderson, a pretty and popular Pleasantville High cheerleader, David/Bud's girlfriend
- Jane Kaczmarek as David and Jennifer's mother
- Reese Witherspoon as Jennifer / Mary Sue Parker
  - Natalie Ramsey as the real Mary Sue Parker
- Denise Dowse as health teacher
- Giuseppe Andrews as Howard, David's best friend in the real world
- Marissa Ribisi as Kimmy, one of Jennifer's friends in the real world
- Jenny Lewis as Christin, one of Jennifer's friends in the real world
- Paul Walker as Skip Martin, captain of Pleasantville High's basketball team, Jennifer/Mary Sue's boyfriend
- Maggie Lawson as Lisa Anne, one of Mary Sue's best friends
- Andrea Taylor as Peggy Jane, one of Mary Sue's best friends
- David Tom as "Whitey"
- Nancy Lenehan as Marge Jenkins

== Production ==
This was the first time that a new feature film was created by scanning and digitizing recorded film footage for the purpose of removing or manipulating colors. The black-and-white-meets-color world portrayed in the movie was filmed entirely in color; in all, approximately 163,000 frames of 35 mm footage were scanned, in order to selectively desaturate and adjust contrast digitally. The scanning was done in Los Angeles by Cinesite, utilizing a Spirit DataCine for scanning at 2K resolution and a MegaDef Colour Correction System from Pandora International. Principal photography took place from March 1 to July 2, 1997.

The death of camera operator Brent Hershman, who was involved in a car accident on Interstate 105 and fell asleep while driving home after a 19-hour workday on the set of the film, resulted in a wrongful death suit, claiming that New Line Cinema, New Line Productions and Juno Pix Inc. were responsible for the death as a result of the lengthy work hours imposed on the set. In response to Hershman's death, crew members launched a petition for 'Brent's Rule', which would limit workdays to a maximum of 14 hours; the petition was ultimately unsuccessful.

The film is dedicated to Hershman, as well as to director Ross's mother, Gail, and actor J. T. Walsh, who also died before the film's release.

== Themes ==
Director Gary Ross stated, "This movie is about the fact that personal repression gives rise to larger political oppression...That when we're afraid of certain things in ourselves or we're afraid of change, we project those fears on to other things, and a lot of very ugly social situations can develop."

Robert Beuka says in his book SuburbiaNation, "Pleasantville is a morality tale concerning the values of contemporary suburban America by holding that social landscape up against both the Utopian and the dystopian visions of suburbia that emerged in the 1950s."

Robert McDaniel of Film & History described the town as the perfect place, "It never rains, the highs and lows rest at 72 degrees, the fire department exists only to rescue treed cats, and the basketball team never misses the hoop." However, McDaniel says, "Pleasantville is a false hope. David's journey tells him only that there is no 'right' life, no model for how things are 'supposed to be'."

Warren Epstein of The Gazette wrote, "This use of color as a metaphor in black-and-white films certainly has a rich tradition, from the over-the-rainbow land in The Wizard of Oz to the girl in the red dress who made the Holocaust real for Oskar Schindler in Schindler's List. In Pleasantville, color represents the transformation from repression to enlightenment. People—and their surroundings—change from black-and-white to color when they connect with the essence of who they really are."

== Reception ==
=== Box office ===
Pleasantville earned $8.9 million during its opening weekend, ranking number one at the box office ahead of Practical Magic. In its second weekend, it dropped to number two, grossing $6.6 million. It grossed an additional $6 million during its third weekend, ranking at number three. It would ultimately earn a total of $49.8 million against a $60 million budget, making it a box-office failure but has since become a cult classic.

=== Critical response ===
Pleasantville received positive reviews from critics. On the review aggregator website Rotten Tomatoes, the film holds an approval rating of 86% based on 98 reviews, with an average rating of 7.7/10. The website's critics consensus reads, "Filled with lighthearted humor, timely social commentary, and dazzling visuals, Pleasantville is an artful blend of subversive satire and well-executed Hollywood formula." Metacritic, which uses a weighted average, assigned the film a score of 71 out of 100, based on 32 critics, indicating "generally favorable" reviews. Audiences polled by CinemaScore gave the film an average grade of "B" on an A+ to F scale.

Roger Ebert gave the film four stars out of four, calling it "one of the best and most original films of the year". Janet Maslin wrote that its "ingenious fantasy" has "seriously belabored its once-gentle metaphor and light comic spirit". Peter M. Nichols, judging the film for its child-viewing worthiness, jokingly wrote in The New York Times that the town of Pleasantville "makes Father Knows Best look like Dallas". Joe Leydon of Variety called it "a provocative, complex and surprisingly anti-nostalgic parable wrapped in the beguiling guise of a commercial high-concept comedy". He commented that some storytelling problems emerge late in the film, but wrote that "Ross is to be commended for refusing to take the easy way out".

Entertainment Weekly wrote a mixed review: "Pleasantville is ultramodern and beautiful. But technical elegance and fine performances mask the shallowness of a story as simpleminded as the '50s TV to which it condescends; certainly it's got none of the depth, poignance, and brilliance of The Truman Show, the recent TV-is-stifling drama that immediately comes to mind." Dave Rettig of Christian Answers said: "On a surface level, the message of the film appears to be 'morality is black and white and pleasant, but sin is color and better,' because often through the film the Pleasantvillians become color after sin (adultery, premarital sex, physical assault, etc...). In one scene in particular, a young woman shows a brightly colored apple to young (and not yet colored) David, encouraging him to take and eat it. Very reminiscent of the Genesis's account of the fall of man."

Time Out New York reviewer Andrew Johnston observed, "Pleasantville doesn't have the consistent internal logic that great fantasies require, and Ross just can't resist spelling everything out for the dim bulbs in the audience. That's a real drag, because the film's fundamental premise—crossing America's nostalgia fixation with Pirandello and the Oz/Narnia/Wonderland archetype—is so damn cool, the film really should have been a masterpiece."

Jesse Walker, writing a retrospective in the January 2010 issue of Reason, argued that the film was misunderstood as a tale of kids from the 1990s bringing life into the conformist world of the 1950s. Walker points out that the supposedly outside influences changing the town of Pleasantville—the civil rights movement, J. D. Salinger, modern art, premarital sex, cool jazz and rockabilly—were all present in the 1950s. Pleasantville "contrasts the faux '50s of our TV-fueled nostalgia with the social ferment that was actually taking place while those sanitized shows first aired".

=== Legacy ===
Filmmaker Jon M. Chu cited the film, alongside The Truman Show (also released in 1998), as an influence on how the Land of Oz is thematically portrayed in the two-part film adaptation of the musical Wicked (2024–2025), saying "It helps create this idea of the rebelliousness that this new younger generation are discovering ... How far will that take everybody in Oz throughout the course of the whole story of both movies? It's an awakening of a generation. You start to see the truth about things that maybe you were taught differently."

For the film's 2026 Shout! Factory-Ultra HD Blu-ray release, director Gary Ross chose to edit out a line of dialogue spoken by Reese Witherspoon at the end in which she says "I did the slut thing, David. It got kind of old."

=== Accolades ===
Award	Category	Nominee(s)	Result	Ref.
Academy Awards	Best Art Direction	Art Direction: Jeannine Oppewall; Set Decoration: Jay Hart	Nominated	
Academy Awards	Best Costume Design	Judianna Makovsky	Nominated	
Academy Awards	Best Original Dramatic Score	Randy Newman	Nominated	
American Comedy Awards	Funniest Supporting Actor in a Motion Picture	William H. Macy	Nominated	
Art Directors Guild Awards	Excellence in Production Design for a Feature Film	Jeannine Oppewall	Nominated	
Artios Awards	Best Casting for Feature Film – Drama	Ellen Lewis and Debra Zane	Nominated	
Boston Society of Film Critics Awards	Best Supporting Actor	William H. Macy (also for A Civil Action and Psycho)	Won (Note: Tied with Billy Bob Thornton for A Simple Plan.)	
Boston Society of Film Critics Awards	Best Supporting Actress	Joan Allen	Won	
Boston Society of Film Critics Awards	Best Cinematography	John Lindley	Nominated	
Chicago Film Critics Association Awards	Best Supporting Actress	Joan Allen	Nominated	
Chlotrudis Awards	Best Supporting Actress	Joan Allen	Nominated	
Chlotrudis Awards	Best Cinematography	John Lindley	Nominated	
Costume Designers Guild Awards	Excellence in Costume Design for Film	Judianna Makovsky	Won	
Critics' Choice Movie Awards	Best Picture		Nominated	
Critics' Choice Movie Awards	Best Supporting Actress	Joan Allen	Won (Note: Tied with Kathy Bates for Primary Colors.)	
Dallas–Fort Worth Film Critics Association Awards	Best Supporting Actress	Joan Allen	Won	
Hugo Awards	Best Dramatic Presentation	Gary Ross	Nominated	
International Film Music Critics Association Awards	Best Original Score for a Drama Film	Randy Newman	Nominated	
Los Angeles Film Critics Association Awards	Best Supporting Actress	Joan Allen	Won	
Los Angeles Film Critics Association Awards	Best Production Design	Jeannine Oppewall	Won	
Online Film & Television Association Awards	Best Comedy/Musical Picture	Jon Kilik, Gary Ross, and Steven Soderbergh	Nominated	
Online Film & Television Association Awards	Best Comedy/Musical Actress	Joan Allen	Nominated	
Online Film & Television Association Awards	Best Supporting Actress	Joan Allen	Nominated	
Online Film & Television Association Awards	Best First Feature	Gary Ross	Nominated	
Online Film & Television Association Awards	Best Cinematography	John Lindley	Nominated	
Online Film & Television Association Awards	Best Comedy/Musical Score	Randy Newman	Nominated	
Online Film & Television Association Awards	Best Adapted Song	"Across the Universe"; Music and Lyrics by John Lennon and Paul McCartney; Performed by Fiona Apple	Won	
Online Film & Television Association Awards	Best Makeup		Nominated	
Online Film & Television Association Awards	Best Visual Effects		Nominated	
Online Film Critics Society Awards	Best Supporting Actress	Joan Allen	Won	
Online Film Critics Society Awards	Best Cinematography	John Lindley	Nominated	
Online Film Critics Society Awards	Best Editing	William Goldenberg	Nominated	
Online Film Critics Society Awards	Best Original Score	Randy Newman	Won	
Producers Guild of America Awards	Most Promising Producer in Theatrical Motion Pictures	Gary Ross	Won	
Satellite Awards	Best Motion Picture – Musical or Comedy		Nominated	
Satellite Awards	Best Actor in a Supporting Role in a Motion Picture – Musical or Comedy	Jeff Daniels	Nominated	
Satellite Awards	Best Actress in a Supporting Role in a Motion Picture – Musical or Comedy	Joan Allen	Won	
Satellite Awards	Best Director	Gary Ross	Nominated	
Satellite Awards	Best Original Screenplay	Gary Ross	Won	
Satellite Awards	Best Art Direction	Jeannine Oppewall and Jay Hart	Nominated	
Satellite Awards	Best Cinematography	John Lindley	Nominated	
Satellite Awards	Best Costume Design	Judianna Makovsky	Nominated	
Satellite Awards	Best Editing	William Goldenberg	Nominated	
Satellite Awards	Best Original Score	Randy Newman	Nominated	
Saturn Awards	Best Fantasy Film		Won	
Saturn Awards	Best Supporting Actress	Joan Allen	Won	
Saturn Awards	Best Performance by a Younger Actor/Actress	Tobey Maguire	Won	
Saturn Awards	Best Writing	Gary Ross	Nominated	
Saturn Awards	Best Costumes	Judianna Makovsky	Nominated	
Southeastern Film Critics Association Awards	Best Picture		7th Place	
Southeastern Film Critics Association Awards	Best Supporting Actress	Joan Allen	Won	
Teen Choice Awards	Choice Movie – Drama		Nominated	
Teen Choice Awards	Most Funniest Scene	Reese Witherspoon and Joan Allen	Nominated	
Turkish Film Critics Association Awards	Best Foreign Film		13th Place	
Young Hollywood Awards	Female Breakthrough Performance	Reese Witherspoon	Won	

== Soundtrack ==
Pleasantville: Music from the Motion Picture

Soundtrack album by various artists
- Released: October 13, 1998
- Genre: Pop
- Length: 47:37
- Label: New Line
- Producers: Jon Brion; Bruno Coon; Bonnie Greenberg; Randy Newman

The soundtrack features music from the 1950s and 1960s such as "Be-Bop-A-Lula" by Gene Vincent, "Take Five" by the Dave Brubeck Quartet, "So What" by Miles Davis, "Rave On" by Buddy Holly, and "At Last" by Etta James. The main score was composed by Randy Newman; he received an Oscar nomination in the original music category. A score release is also in distribution, although the suite track is only available on the standard soundtrack. Among the Pleasantville DVD "Special Features" is a music-only feature with commentary by Randy Newman.

The music video for Fiona Apple's version of "Across the Universe", directed by Paul Thomas Anderson, uses the set of the diner from the film. AllMusic rated the album two-and-a-half stars out of five.

== See also ==
- Stay Tuned
- The Truman Show
- WandaVision
