= Christopher Peterson (costume designer) =

American costume designer

- Occupation: Costume designer

Christopher Peterson is an American costume designer. He was nominated for an Academy Award in the category Best Costume Design for Martin Scorsese's epic crime film The Irishman (2019) at the 92nd Academy Awards, for which he shared the nomination with Sandy Powell.

== Selected filmography ==
- The Irishman (2019; co-nominated with Sandy Powell)
