= Sharen Davis =

American costume designer

- Born: Sharen Kay Davis; February 22, 1957 (age 69)
- Occupation: Costume designer
- Years active: 1987–present

Sharen Davis (born February 22, 1957) is an American costume designer. Her accolades include a Costume Designers Guild Award and an Emmy Award, in addition to nominations for two Academy Awards. She was honored with the Costume Designers Guild Career Achievement Award in 2022. Davis is known for her frequent collaborations with actor and filmmaker Denzel Washington.

== Filmography ==
Year	Title	Director	Notes
1992	Equinox	Alan Rudolph	
1993	Younger and Younger	Percy Adlon	
1995	Devil in a Blue Dress	Carl Franklin	
1997	Money Talks	Brett Ratner	
1998	Dr. Dolittle	Betty Thomas	
1998	Rush Hour	Brett Ratner	
2000	Nutty Professor II: The Klumps	Peter Segal	
2001	Double Take	George Gallo	
2002	High Crimes	Carl Franklin	
2002	Antwone Fisher	Denzel Washington	
2003	Nat Turner: A Troublesome Property	Charles Burnett	Documentary film
2003	Out of Time	Carl Franklin	
2004	Ray	Taylor Hackford	
2005	Beauty Shop	Bille Woodruff	
2006	Akeelah and the Bee	Doug Atchison	
2006	Dreamgirls	Bill Condon	
2006	The Pursuit of Happyness	Gabriele Muccino	
2007	The Great Debaters	Denzel Washington	
2008	Seven Pounds	Gabriele Muccino	
2009	Middle Men	George Gallo	
2010	The Book of Eli	Albert Hughes; Allen Hughes	
2011	The Help	Tate Taylor	
2012	Looper	Rian Johnson	
2012	Django Unchained	Quentin Tarantino	
2014	Godzilla	Gareth Edwards	
2014	Get on Up	Tate Taylor	
2016	The 5th Wave	J Blakeson	
2016	The Magnificent Seven	Antoine Fuqua	
2016	Fences	Denzel Washington	
2018	Alpha	Albert Hughes	
2020	Project Power	Henry Joost; Ariel Schulman	
2021	King Richard	Reinaldo Marcus Green	
2021	A Journal for Jordan	Denzel Washington	
2023	Candy Cane Lane	Reginald Hudlin	

== Television credits ==
Year	Title	Notes
1993	Laurel Avenue	2 episodes
1994	Another Midnight Run	Television film
1994	State of Emergency	Television film
1994	Midnight Runaround	Television film
1995	Zooman	Television film
1995	Earth 2	7 episodes
1996	Nightjohn	Television film
1997	Vanishing Point	Television film
1998	Hallmark Hall of Fame	Episode: "Grace and Glorie"
1999	Passing Glory	Television film
2000	Freedom Song	Television film
2011	Falling Skies	Episode: "Live and Learn"
2018	Westworld	10 episodes
2019	Watchmen	Episode: "It's Summer and We're Running Out of Ice"

== Awards and nominations ==
Major associations

Academy Awards

Year	Category	Nominated work	Result	Ref.
2005	Best Costume Design	Ray	Nominated	
2007	Best Costume Design	Dreamgirls	Nominated	

Emmy Awards

Year	Category	Nominated work	Result	Ref.
Primetime Emmy Awards
2018	Outstanding Fantasy/Sci-Fi Costumes	Westworld (Episode: "Akane no Mai")	Nominated	
2020	Outstanding Fantasy/Sci-Fi Costumes	Watchmen (Episode: "It's Summer and We're Running Out of Ice")	Won	

Miscellaneous awards

List of Sharen Davis other awards and nominations
Award	Year (Note: Indicates the year of ceremony. Each year is linked to the article about the awards held that year, wherever possible.)	Category	Title	Result
Costume Designers Guild Awards	2005	Excellence in Period/Fantasy Film	Ray	Nominated
Costume Designers Guild Awards	2007	Excellence in Period Film	Dreamgirls	Nominated
Costume Designers Guild Awards	2012	Excellence in Period Film	The Help	Nominated
Costume Designers Guild Awards	2019	Excellence in Sci-Fi/Fantasy Television	Westworld	Won
Costume Designers Guild Awards	2020	Excellence in Sci-Fi/Fantasy Television	Watchmen (Episode: "It's Summer and We're Running Out of Ice")	Nominated
Costume Designers Guild Awards	2022	Career Achievement Award	—N/a	Honored
Critics' Choice Awards	2012	Best Costume Design	The Help	Nominated
Satellite Awards	2006	Best Costume Design	Dreamgirls	Nominated
Saturn Awards	2013	Best Costume Design	Django Unchained	Nominated
