= Judianna Makovsky =

American costume designer (born 1955)

- Born: August 24, 1955 (age 71); New Jersey, USA
- Occupation: Costume designer
- Years active: 1984–present

Judianna Makovsky (born August 24, 1955) is an American costume designer. She is best known for creating the costumes on such notable films as Harry Potter and the Philosopher's Stone (2001) and The Hunger Games (2012), as well as various installments within the Marvel Cinematic Universe starting from Captain America: The Winter Soldier (2014). Her accolades include an Emmy Award and three Costume Designers Guild Awards, in addition to nominations for three Academy Awards and a BAFTA Award. She was honored with the Costume Designers Guild Career Achievement Award in 2013.

== Filmography ==
=== Film ===
Year	Title	Director	Notes
1987	Gardens of Stone	Francis Ford Coppola	
1988	Big	Penny Marshall	
1988	Tucker: The Man and His Dream	Francis Ford Coppola	Associate costume designer
1989	Lost Angels	Hugh Hudson	
1990	Reversal of Fortune	Barbet Schroeder	
1990	Dick Tracy	Warren Beatty	Associate costume designer
1993	Six Degrees of Separation	Fred Schepisi	
1994	The Ref	Ted Demme	
1994	The Specialist	Luis Llosa	
1995	The Quick and the Dead	Sam Raimi	
1995	A Little Princess	Alfonso Cuarón	
1996	White Squall	Ridley Scott	
1997	Lolita	Adrian Lyne	
1997	The Devil's Advocate	Taylor Hackford	
1998	Great Expectations	Alfonso Cuarón	
1998	Practical Magic	Griffin Dunne	
1998	Pleasantville	Gary Ross	
1999	For Love of the Game	Sam Raimi	
2000	The Legend of Bagger Vance	Robert Redford	
2001	Harry Potter and the Philosopher's Stone	Chris Columbus	
2003	Seabiscuit	Gary Ross	
2004	National Treasure	Jon Turteltaub	
2006	X-Men: The Last Stand	Brett Ratner	
2007	Mr. Brooks	Bruce A. Evans	
2007	National Treasure: Book of Secrets	Jon Turteltaub	
2009	Cirque du Freak: The Vampire's Assistant	Paul Weitz	
2010	The Last Airbender	M. Night Shyamalan	
2011	Trespass	Joel Schumacher	
2012	The Hunger Games	Gary Ross	
2013	Movie 43	Brett Ratner	Segment: "Happy Birthday"
2013	The Face of Love	Arie Posin	
2014	Captain America: The Winter Soldier	Anthony Russo; Joe Russo	
2014	Earth to Echo	Dave Green	
2015	Last Days in the Desert	Rodrigo García	
2015	Goosebumps	Rob Letterman	
2016	Captain America: Civil War	Anthony Russo; Joe Russo	
2017	Guardians of the Galaxy Vol. 2	James Gunn	
2018	Avengers: Infinity War	Anthony Russo; Joe Russo	
2019	Avengers: Endgame	Anthony Russo; Joe Russo	
2021	The Suicide Squad	James Gunn	
2022	The Gray Man	Anthony Russo; Joe Russo	
2023	Guardians of the Galaxy Vol. 3	James Gunn	
2025	The Electric State	Anthony Russo; Joe Russo	
2025	Superman	James Gunn	
2026	Avengers: Doomsday	Anthony Russo; Joe Russo	Post-production
2027	Man of Tomorrow	James Gunn	Filming

=== Television ===
Year	Title	Notes
1985	CBS Schoolbreak Special	Episode: "The Day the Senior Class Got Married"
1989	Double Exposure: The Story of Margaret Bourke-White	Television film
1992	Miss Rose White	Television film
1993	TriBeCa	Episode: "The Box"
1993	Wild Palms	5 episodes
2011	CHAOS	Episode: "Pilot"
2022	The Guardians of the Galaxy Holiday Special	Television special

== Awards and nominations ==
Major associations

Academy Awards

Year	Category	Nominated work	Result	Ref.
1999	Best Costume Design	Pleasantville	Nominated	
2002	Best Costume Design	Harry Potter and the Philosopher's Stone	Nominated	
2004	Best Costume Design	Seabiscuit	Nominated	

BAFTA Awards

Year	Category	Nominated work	Result	Ref.
British Academy Film Awards
2002	Best Costume Design	Harry Potter and the Philosopher's Stone	Nominated	

Emmy Awards

Year	Category	Nominated work	Result	Ref.
Children's and Family Emmy Awards
2023	Outstanding Costume Design/Styling	The Guardians of the Galaxy Holiday Special	Won	

Miscellaneous awards

List of Judianna Makovsky other awards and nominations
Award	Year (Note: Indicates the year of ceremony. Each year is linked to the article about the awards held that year, wherever possible.)	Category	Title	Result	Ref.
Astra Film and Creative Arts Awards	2024	Best Costume Design	Guardians of the Galaxy Vol. 3	Nominated	
Costume Designers Guild Awards	1999	Excellence in Film	Pleasantville	Won	
Costume Designers Guild Awards	2002	Excellence in Period/Fantasy Film	Harry Potter and the Philosopher's Stone	Won	
Costume Designers Guild Awards	2004	Excellence in Period/Fantasy Film	Seabiscuit	Nominated	
Costume Designers Guild Awards	2007	Excellence in Fantasy Film	X-Men: The Last Stand	Nominated	
Costume Designers Guild Awards	2013	Excellence in Fantasy Film	The Hunger Games	Nominated	
Costume Designers Guild Awards	2013	Excellence in Commercial Design	Captain Morgan Black	Won	
Costume Designers Guild Awards	2013	Career Achievement Award	—N/a	Honored	
Costume Designers Guild Awards	2019	Excellence in Sci-Fi/Fantasy Film	Avengers: Infinity War	Nominated	
Costume Designers Guild Awards	2020	Excellence in Sci-Fi/Fantasy Film	Avengers: Endgame	Nominated	
Costume Designers Guild Awards	2022	Excellence in Sci-Fi/Fantasy Film	The Suicide Squad	Nominated	
Phoenix Film Critics Society Awards	2002	Best Costume Design	Harry Potter and the Philosopher's Stone	Nominated	
Satellite Awards	1999	Best Costume Design	Pleasantville	Nominated	
Satellite Awards	2004	Best Costume Design	Seabiscuit	Nominated	
Saturn Awards	1999	Best Costume Design	Pleasantville	Nominated	
Saturn Awards	2002	Best Costume Design	Harry Potter and the Philosopher's Stone	Won	
Saturn Awards	2007	Best Costume Design	X-Men: The Last Stand	Nominated	
Saturn Awards	2019	Best Costume Design	Avengers: Endgame	Nominated	
Saturn Awards	2023	Best Costume Design	Guardians of the Galaxy Vol. 3	Nominated	
Saturn Awards	2026	Best Costume Design	Superman	Nominated	
