= Harry Potter and the Philosopher's Stone (film) =

2001 film by Chris Columbus

- Theatrical release poster
- Directed by: Chris Columbus
- Screenplay by: Steve Kloves
- Based on: Harry Potter and the Philosopher's Stone by J. K. Rowling
- Produced by: David Heyman
- Starring: Daniel Radcliffe; Rupert Grint; Emma Watson; John Cleese; Robbie Coltrane; Warwick Davis; Richard Griffiths; Richard Harris; Ian Hart; John Hurt; Alan Rickman; Fiona Shaw; Maggie Smith; Julie Walters
- Cinematography: John Seale
- Edited by: Richard Francis-Bruce
- Music by: John Williams
- Production companies: Warner Bros. Pictures; Heyday Films; 1492 Pictures
- Distributed by: Warner Bros. Pictures
- Release dates: 4 November 2001 (Odeon Leicester Square); 16 November 2001 (United Kingdom and United States)
- Running time: 152 minutes
- Countries: United Kingdom; United States
- Language: English
- Budget: $125 million
- Box office: $1.029 billion

Harry Potter and the Philosopher's Stone (also known as Harry Potter and the Sorcerer's Stone in the United States, India and the Philippines) is a 2001 fantasy film directed by Chris Columbus and written by Steve Kloves, based on the 1997 novel by J. K. Rowling. It is the first instalment in the Harry Potter film series, and stars Daniel Radcliffe as Harry Potter, with Rupert Grint as Ron Weasley, and Emma Watson as Hermione Granger. The film follows Harry's first year at Hogwarts as he discovers that he is a famous wizard and begins his formal wizarding education.

Warner Bros. Pictures bought the film rights to the book in 1999 for a reported £1 million ($1.65 million). Production began in the United Kingdom in 2000, with Columbus being chosen to helm the film from a short list of directors that included Steven Spielberg and Rob Reiner. Rowling insisted that the entire cast be British and Irish, with the three leads chosen in August 2000 following open casting calls. Filming took place at Leavesden Film Studios and historic buildings around the United Kingdom from September 2000 to March 2001.

Harry Potter and the Philosopher's Stone premiered at Odeon Leicester Square in London on 4 November 2001 and was released on 16 November in the United Kingdom and the United States by Warner Bros. Pictures. It became a critical and commercial success, grossing $974 million at the box office during its initial run and over $1 billion with subsequent re-releases, against a $125 million budget. It became the highest-grossing film of 2001 and the second-highest-grossing film at the time. The film was nominated for several awards, including Academy Awards for Best Original Score, Best Art Direction and Best Costume Design. It was followed by seven sequels, beginning with Harry Potter and the Chamber of Secrets in 2002 and ending with Harry Potter and the Deathly Hallows – Part 2 in 2011.

== Plot ==
Orphaned as a baby in 1981, Harry Potter is entrusted to his only living relatives, the Dursley family that is not related to the wizarding world, by Professor Albus Dumbledore, Professor Minerva McGonagall, and key keeper Rubeus Hagrid from Hogwarts School of Witchcraft and Wizardry. Due to their hatred of the wizarding world, the Dursleys keep Harry unaware of magic until his eleventh birthday approaches in 1991, when their home is flooded with letters addressed to Harry, informing him he has been accepted to study magic at Hogwarts. As the Dursleys intercept the letters, Hagrid is sent to fetch Harry. Harry subsequently purchases school supplies with Hagrid at Diagon Alley, where he learns he is celebrated for surviving the dark wizard Lord Voldemort, who seemingly perished after murdering Harry's parents for working against him and left him with only a lightning bolt-shaped scar.

Harry journeys to Hogwarts aboard the Hogwarts Express, where he meets Ron Weasley and Hermione Granger. Upon arrival, the first-year students are sorted into four houses: Harry, Ron, and Hermione join Gryffindor, while the haughty Draco Malfoy goes to Slytherin, known for producing dark wizards. As they begin learning about magic and exploring Hogwarts, the three accidentally wander onto a forbidden corridor on the third floor, guarded by a giant three-headed dog named Fluffy; they subsequently question what it could be guarding. They also question how one would acquire a three-headed dog.

While Harry and Ron become friends, Hermione's studious ways ostracise her from the other students. On Halloween, Ron insults her and she retreats to the girls' toilets at the same time a mountain troll is found loose in the school. Harry and Ron rescue her from the troll and, when the teachers find them, Hermione takes the blame by saying she went looking for the troll, affirming the three's friendship; at the same time, Harry notices that the potions professor, Severus Snape, has sustained an injury. At his first flying lesson, Harry displays such impressive flying skills that McGonagall makes him Seeker for the Gryffindor Quidditch team; during his first match, Ron and Hermione act when they see Snape appearing to jinx Harry's broomstick. Snape's actions lead Harry to suspect him of trying to get into the third-floor corridor, which Hagrid dismisses, unintentionally revealing Fluffy is guarding something known only to Dumbledore and Nicolas Flamel.

Harry and Ron spend Christmas together at Hogwarts, where Harry receives a Cloak of Invisibility and discovers the Mirror of Erised, which displays one's deepest desire. When Hermione returns, she informs the boys that Nicolas Flamel is the creator of the Philosopher's Stone, which can grant users immortality, and determines that this is what is being kept on the third floor. When Harry later encounters someone in the forest surrounding the school feeding on a unicorn, which the centaur Firenze informs him can keep a person alive, Harry deduces that it was Voldemort and that Snape wants to use the Philosopher's Stone to revive him.

When Dumbledore is summoned to London, the three suspect Snape will attempt to steal the stone and decide to stop him. They believed that he would use the stone to make sure that Voldemort would live forever as long as he had the stone. Sneaking onto the third floor, they get past Fluffy and face further defences of a strangling plant, flying keys, and a giant, enchanted chessboard, which leaves Ron incapacitated. Hermione tends to him, leaving Harry alone to confront the intruder, which turns out to be timid Professor Quirrell, whom Snape had been investigating all year while protecting Harry. Harry is granted the Stone by the final defence, the Mirror of Erised, by virtue of not desiring it. Quirrell reveals Voldemort's weakened form on the back of his head, and they attempt to persuade Harry to hand it over. When Harry refuses, Voldemort orders Quirrell to kill him, but Harry's touch incinerates Quirrell's body, from which Voldemort's soul escapes.

Harry wakes up in the hospital wing, where Dumbledore explains that the Stone has been destroyed, and that Harry has twice overcome Voldemort owing to his mother's sacrifice, which repels harmful magic through him. As the school year ends, Harry, Ron, Hermione, and Neville Longbottom earn house points for their heroism, enabling Gryffindor to win the House Cup despite Slytherin's lead. As the summer nears, Harry is happy to have found a real home at Hogwarts.

== Cast ==
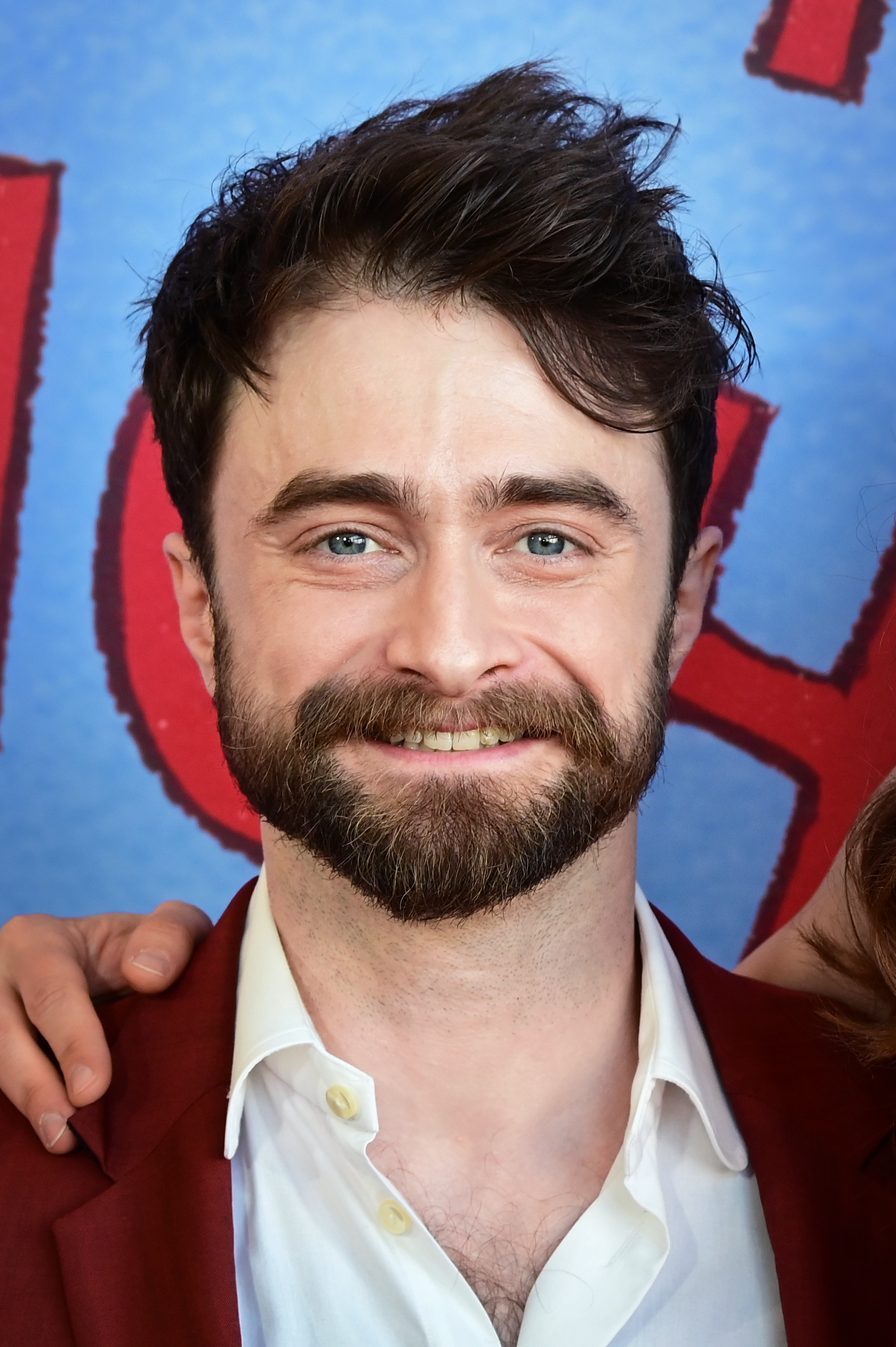
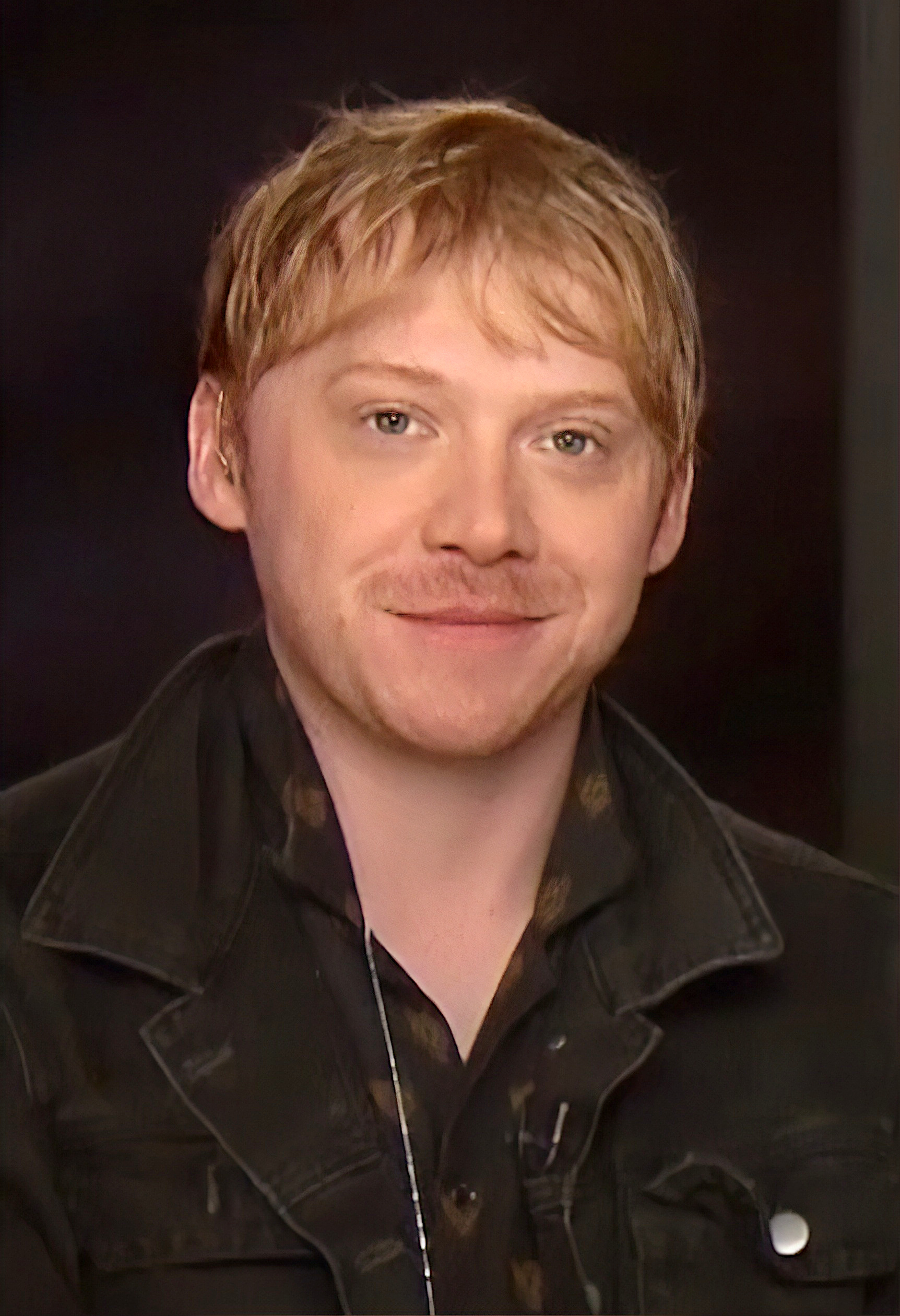
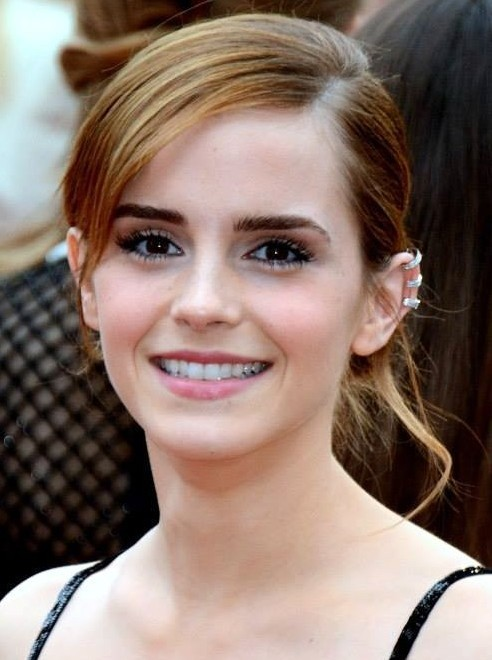
Top to bottom: Daniel Radcliffe (pictured in 2026), Rupert Grint (2018), and Emma Watson (2013)
- Daniel Radcliffe as Harry Potter:
  An 11-year-old orphan living with his unwelcoming aunt, uncle, and cousin, who learns of his own fame as a wizard known to have survived his parents' murder at the hands of the dark wizard Lord Voldemort as an infant when he is accepted to Hogwarts School of Witchcraft and Wizardry. Columbus had wanted Radcliffe for the role since he saw him in the BBC's production of David Copperfield before the open casting sessions had taken place but had been told by casting director Susan Figgis that Radcliffe's protective parents would not allow their son to take part in fear of him not going to have a normal childhood. Columbus explained that his persistence in giving Radcliffe the role was responsible for Figgis' resignation. Radcliffe was asked to audition in 2000 when Heyman and Kloves met him and his parents at a production of Stones in His Pockets in London. Heyman and Columbus successfully managed to convince Radcliffe's parents that their son would be protected from media intrusion. They agreed to let him play Harry. Rowling approved of Radcliffe's casting, stating that "having seen [his] screen test I don't think Chris Columbus could have found a better Harry." Radcliffe was reportedly paid £1 million for the film, although he felt the fee was "not that important" to him. The Saunders triplets appear as Harry as a baby.
- Rupert Grint as Ron Weasley:
  Harry's best friend at Hogwarts and a younger member of the Weasley wizarding family. A fan of the series, Grint decided he would be perfect for the part "because [he has] ginger hair". Having seen a Newsround report about the open casting he sent in a video of himself rapping about how he wished to receive the part. His attempt was successful as the casting team asked for a meeting with him.
- Emma Watson as Hermione Granger:
  Harry's other best friend and the trio's brains. Watson's Oxford theatre teacher passed her name on to the casting agents and she had to do over five interviews before she got the part. Watson took her audition seriously, but "never really thought [she] had any chance of getting the role." The producers were impressed by Watson's self-confidence and she outperformed the thousands of other girls who had applied.
- John Cleese as Nearly Headless Nick: The ghost of Gryffindor House.
- Robbie Coltrane as Rubeus Hagrid:
  A half-giant and Hogwarts' gamekeeper. Coltrane was one of the two actors Rowling wanted most, along with Smith as McGonagall. Coltrane, who was already a fan of the books, prepared for the role by discussing Hagrid's past and future with Rowling.
- Warwick Davis as Filius Flitwick: The Charms Master and head of Ravenclaw House. Davis also plays two other roles in the film: the Goblin Head Teller at Gringotts, and dubs the voice of Griphook, who is embodied by Verne Troyer.
- Richard Griffiths as Vernon Dursley: Harry's Muggle uncle.
- Richard Harris as Albus Dumbledore: Hogwarts' Headmaster and one of the most famous and powerful wizards of all time. Harris initially rejected the role, only to reverse his decision after his granddaughter stated she would never speak to him again if he did not take it.
- John Hurt as Mr. Ollivander: a highly regarded wandmaker and the owner of Ollivanders.
- Alan Rickman as Severus Snape: The Potions Master and head of Slytherin House.
- Fiona Shaw as Petunia Dursley: Harry's Muggle aunt.
- Maggie Smith as Minerva McGonagall: The Deputy Headmistress, head of Gryffindor and transfiguration teacher at Hogwarts. Smith was one of the two actors Rowling wanted most, along with Coltrane as Hagrid.
- Julie Walters as Molly Weasley: Mother of Ron Weasley.
- Ian Hart as Quirinus Quirrell:
  The stuttering Defence Against the Dark Arts teacher at Hogwarts. Hart also voiced Lord Voldemort, while Richard Bremmer provided his physical appearance and portrayed him as a hooded figure during a flashback.
- Bonnie Wright as Ginny Weasley

Additionally, Zoë Wanamaker appears as Madame Hooch, Hogwarts' flying instructor and Quidditch referee; Tom Felton portrays Draco Malfoy, a student in Slytherin and Harry's rival. Harry Melling plays Dudley Dursley, Harry's Muggle cousin; and David Bradley appears as Argus Filch, Hogwarts' caretaker. Matthew Lewis, Devon Murray and Alfred Enoch portray Neville Longbottom, Seamus Finnigan and Dean Thomas respectively, three first year students in Gryffindor; James and Oliver Phelps play twins Fred and George Weasley, Ron's brothers, while Chris Rankin appears as his other brother Percy, a Gryffindor prefect, Sean Biggerstaff portrays Oliver Wood, the Captain and Keeper of the Gryffindor Quidditch team; Jamie Waylett and Josh Herdman play Crabbe and Goyle, Malfoy's minions; and Leslie Phillips voices the Sorting Hat. Derek Deadman plays Tom, innkeeper of The Leaky Cauldron; and Elizabeth Spriggs appears as the Fat Lady, a painting at Hogwarts. Jean Southern plays dimpled woman on train.

== Production ==
=== Development ===
In 1997, producer David Heyman searched for a children's book that could be adapted into a well-received film. He had planned to produce Diana Wynne Jones' novel The Ogre Downstairs, but his plans fell through. His assistant at Heyday Films then suggested Harry Potter and the Philosopher's Stone, which she believed was "a cool idea." Although originally not liking the title, Heyman read the novel and "fell in love" with it. Following the publication of Harry Potter and the Chamber of Secrets in 1998, Heyman pitched the novels to Warner Bros. Pictures and, in 1999, author J. K. Rowling sold the company the rights to the first four Harry Potter books for a reported £1 million. A demand Rowling made was for Heyman to keep the cast strictly British and Irish; the latter's case has Richard Harris as Albus Dumbledore and Fiona Shaw as Petunia Dursley, and not to cast foreign actors unless absolutely necessary, like casting of French and Eastern European actors in Harry Potter and the Goblet of Fire (2005) where characters from the book are specified as such. Rowling was hesitant to sell the rights because she "didn't want to give them control over the rest of the story" by selling the rights to the characters, which would have enabled Warner Bros. to make non-author-written sequels.

Although filmmaker Steven Spielberg initially negotiated to direct the film and developed a second draft of the script with screenwriter Steven Kloves, he eventually left the project. Spielberg reportedly wanted the adaptation to be an animated film produced by DreamWorks Animation that incorporated elements from subsequent books as well, with American actor Haley Joel Osment to provide Harry Potter's voice. While developing the film, Spielberg suggested Harris, Maggie Smith and Robbie Coltrane to be cast. He later contended that, in his opinion, it was like "shooting ducks in a barrel. It's just a slam dunk. It's just like withdrawing a billion dollars and putting it into your personal bank accounts. There's no challenge". Rowling maintains that she had no role in choosing directors for the films and that "[a]nyone who thinks I could (or would) have 'veto-ed' [sic] him [Spielberg] needs their Quick-Quotes Quill serviced". Heyman recalled that Spielberg decided to direct A.I. Artificial Intelligence (2001) instead. In a 2023 interview, Spielberg stated that he turned down the project so he could spend time with his family.

"Harry Potter is the kind of timeless literary achievement that comes around once in a lifetime. Since the books have generated such a passionate following across the world, it was important to us to find a director that has an affinity for both children and magic. I can't think of anyone more ideally suited for this job than Chris."

— Lorenzo di Bonaventura

After Spielberg left, talks began with other directors, including Chris Columbus, Jonathan Demme, Baz Luhrmann, David Fincher, Terry Gilliam, Mike Newell (who would later direct the Goblet of Fire), Alan Parker, Wolfgang Petersen, Rob Reiner, Ivan Reitman, Tim Robbins, Brad Silberling, Ron Howard, M. Night Shyamalan and Peter Weir. Shyamalan declined as he already working on Signs (2002). Petersen and Reiner both pulled out of the running in March 2000, and the choice was narrowed down to Silberling, Columbus, Parker and Gilliam.

Rowling's first choice director was Gilliam, but Warner Bros. chose Columbus, citing his work on other family films such as Home Alone (1990) and Mrs. Doubtfire (1993) as influences for their decision. Columbus had become a fan of the book series after his daughter persuaded him to read the first three books, leading him to call his agent to arrange a meeting at Warner Bros. to direct the film. When his agent told him that at least 25 other directors were eager to helm the project, Columbus requested his agent to secure his meeting to be the last one so he could give a "lasting impression" and be the studio's "freshest person in their memory".

During two weeks of waiting, Columbus wrote a 130-page director's version of the screenplay to explain his vision for the film's tone. The day of his meeting with Warner Bros. executives including Alan F. Horn, Columbus delivered an "impassioned 45-minute talk" and showed them his annotated script. Weeks later, the studio notified Columbus that he had got the job and sent him to Scotland to meet with Rowling and Heyman. Columbus pitched his vision of the film for two hours, stating that he wanted the Muggle scenes "to be bleak and dreary" but those set in the wizarding world "to be steeped in color, mood, and detail." He took inspiration from David Lean's adaptations of Great Expectations (1946) and Oliver Twist (1948), wishing to use "that sort of darkness, that sort of edge, that quality to the cinematography," while being further inspired by the colour designs from Oliver! (1968) and The Godfather (1972). Columbus turned down the chance to direct Spider-Man (2002) in order to direct the film.

Kloves described adapting the book as "tough", as it did not "lend itself to adaptation as well as the next two books". Kloves often received synopses of books proposed as film adaptations from Warner Bros., which he "almost never read", but Harry Potter jumped out at him. He went out and bought the book, and became an instant fan of the series. When speaking to Warner Bros., he stated that the film had to be British, and had to be true to the characters. Kloves was nervous when he first met Rowling as he did not want her to think he was going to "[destroy] her baby". Rowling admitted that she "was really ready to hate this Steve Kloves," but recalled her initial meeting with him: "The first time I met him, he said to me, 'You know who my favourite character is?' And I thought, You're gonna say Ron. I know you're gonna say Ron. But he said 'Hermione.' And I just kind of melted". Rowling received a large amount of creative control, an arrangement that Columbus did not mind.

Warner Bros. had initially planned to release the film over 4 July 2001 weekend, making for such a short production window that several proposed directors pulled themselves out of the running. Due to time constraints, the date was put back to 16 November 2001.

=== Casting ===
Susie Figgis was appointed as casting director, working with both Columbus and Rowling in auditioning the lead roles of Harry, Ron and Hermione. Columbus' experience while filming Home Alone influenced the casting, and later became extra cautious after learning about Macaulay Culkin's family abuse. Open casting calls were held for the main three roles, with only British children being considered. The principal auditions took place in three parts, with those auditioning having to read a page from the novel, then to improvise a scene of the students' arrival at Hogwarts, and finally to read several pages from the script in front of Columbus. Scenes from Columbus' script for Young Sherlock Holmes (1985) were also used in auditions. On 11 July 2000, Figgis left the production, complaining that Columbus did not consider any of the thousands of children they had auditioned "worthy". She ended up quitting over disagreements with Columbus over who should play the titular character, as Columbus wanted to cast Americans for Harry and the other roles, with rumors that Columbus was thinking on casting Joel Osment or Jake Lloyd from Star Wars: Episode I – The Phantom Menace (1999) to play Harry.

By August 2000, Alan Rickman and Richard Harris were in final talks to play Severus Snape and Albus Dumbledore, respectively, and were confirmed later that month. Tim Roth was the original choice for Snape, but he turned it down for Planet of the Apes (2001). Sean Connery and Christopher Lee were offered the role of Dumbledore, but both declined. Lee turned it down for The Lord of the Rings: The Fellowship of the Ring (2001). Patrick McGoohan was also offered the role, which he declined citing health reasons.

On 14 August 2000, Maggie Smith and Robbie Coltrane were cast as Minerva McGonagall and Rubeus Hagrid. According to Figgis, Robin Williams was interested in playing the role of Hagrid, but was turned down for the role because of the "strictly British and Irish actors only" rule which Columbus was determined to maintain.

On 21 August 2000, Daniel Radcliffe and newcomers Rupert Grint and Emma Watson were selected to play Harry Potter, Ron Weasley and Hermione Granger, respectively. According to Columbus, Harry was the hardest role to cast. Hundreds of young stars auditioned for Harry, including Liam Aiken, Jamie Campbell Bower (who was later cast as a young Gellert Grindelwald in Deathly Hallows Part 1), Tom Felton (who also auditioned for Ron, and was later cast as Draco Malfoy), Nicholas Hoult, William Moseley, and Jack Whitehall. Aiken was Columbus' favorite for the role, having worked with him on the film Stepmom (1998). However, Rowling was firm on her British actors only rule, and even called Columbus to confirm that Aiken would not be cast. Gabriel Thomson was also initially reported as having been given the role, though this would be proven untrue upon the casting of Radcliffe.

Hatty Jones, who starred in the title role in Madeline (1998), was considered for the role of Hermione Granger and had auditioned alongside Watson; she was later deemed outgrown. Katy B also auditioned for Hermione, with Thomas Brodie-Sangster auditioning for the role of Ron. Freddie Boath had been due to audition for a role in the film, but opted instead to star in The Mummy Returns (2001).

In November 2000, Julie Walters and John Cleese joined the cast as Molly Weasley and Nearly-Headless Nick, respectively. Rosie O'Donnell met with Columbus to express her interest in playing the role of Molly and offered the role for "free", but was, like Williams and Aiken, turned away over the British actors only rule. David Thewlis auditioned for Quirinus Quirrell; he would later be cast as Remus Lupin in Harry Potter and the Prisoner of Azkaban (2004). Rowling herself was considered for Lily Evans; Harry's mother, but she turned down the role so Geraldine Somerville was cast.

=== Filming ===
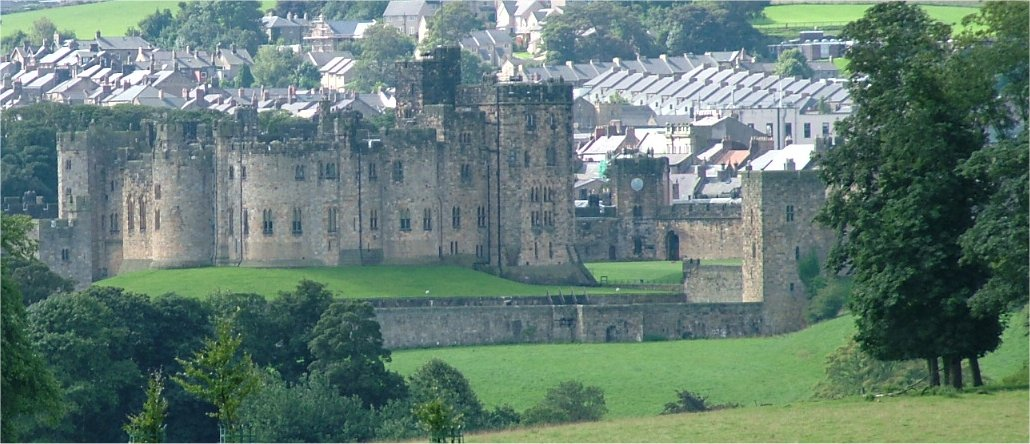
Alnwick Castle in Northumberland was used as a principal filming location for Hogwarts.

Two British film industry officials requested that the film be shot in the United Kingdom, offering their assistance in securing filming locations, the use of Leavesden Film Studios, as well as changing the UK's child labour laws (adding a small number of working hours per week and making the timing of on-set classes more flexible). Warner Bros. accepted their proposal.

Principal photography began on 29 September 2000 at Leavesden Film Studios. Filming at the North Yorkshire's Goathland railway station took place on 2 October 2000. Canterbury Cathedral and Scotland's Inverailort Castle were both touted as possible locations for Hogwarts; Canterbury rejected Warner Bros. proposal due to concerns about the film's "pagan" theme. Alnwick Castle and Gloucester Cathedral were eventually selected as the principal locations for Hogwarts, with some scenes also being filmed at Harrow School. Other Hogwarts scenes were filmed in Durham Cathedral over a two-week period; these included shots of the corridors and some classroom scenes. Oxford University's Divinity School served as the Hogwarts Hospital Wing, and Duke Humfrey's Library, part of the Bodleian, was used as the Hogwarts Library.

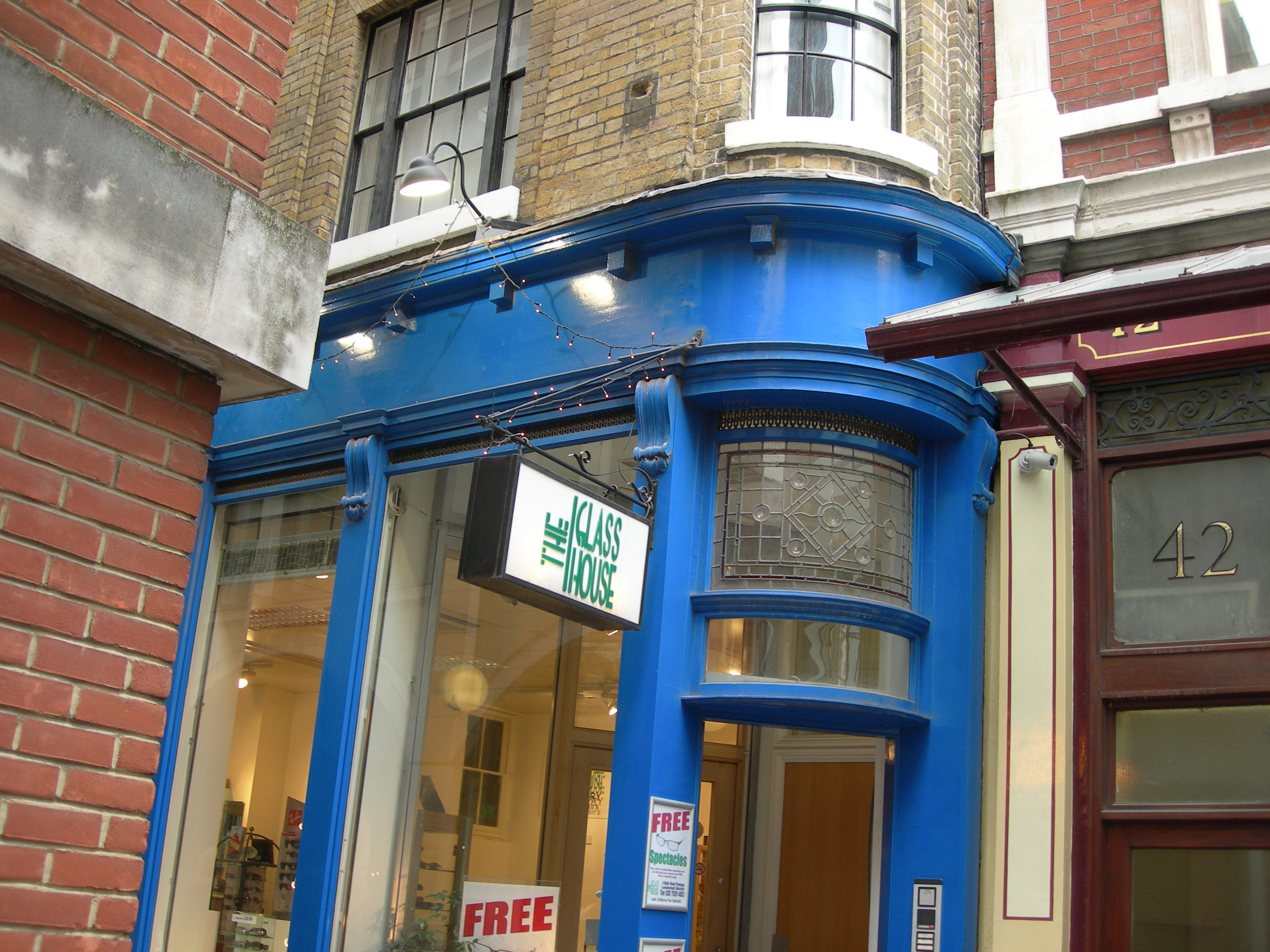
The store in London used as the exterior of The Leaky Cauldron

Filming for Privet Drive took place on Picket Post Close in Bracknell, Berkshire. Filming in the street took two days instead of the planned single day, so payments to the street's residents were correspondingly increased. For all the subsequent film's scenes set in Privet Drive, filming took place on a constructed set in Leavesden Film Studios, which proved to be cheaper than filming on location. London's Australia House was selected as the location for Gringotts Wizarding Bank, while Christ Church, Oxford, was the location for the Hogwarts trophy room. London Zoo's Reptile House was used as the location for the scene in which Harry accidentally sets a snake on Dudley, with King's Cross Station also being used as the book specifies. Filming concluded on 23 March 2001, with final work being done in July 2001.

Because the American title was different, all scenes that mention the philosopher's stone by name had to be shot twice, once with the actors saying "philosopher's" and once with "sorcerer's". The children filmed for four hours and then did three hours of schoolwork. They developed a liking for fake facial injuries from the makeup staff. Radcliffe was initially meant to wear green contact lenses as his eyes are blue, and not green like Harry's, but the lenses gave Radcliffe extreme irritation. Upon consultation with Rowling, it was agreed that Harry could have blue eyes. Radcliffe said that the first time he put on the glasses it set off his allergies.

Columbus said the film had a lot of cuts and was filmed with multiple cameras because he had trouble getting the young cast to "stop smiling" into the camera.

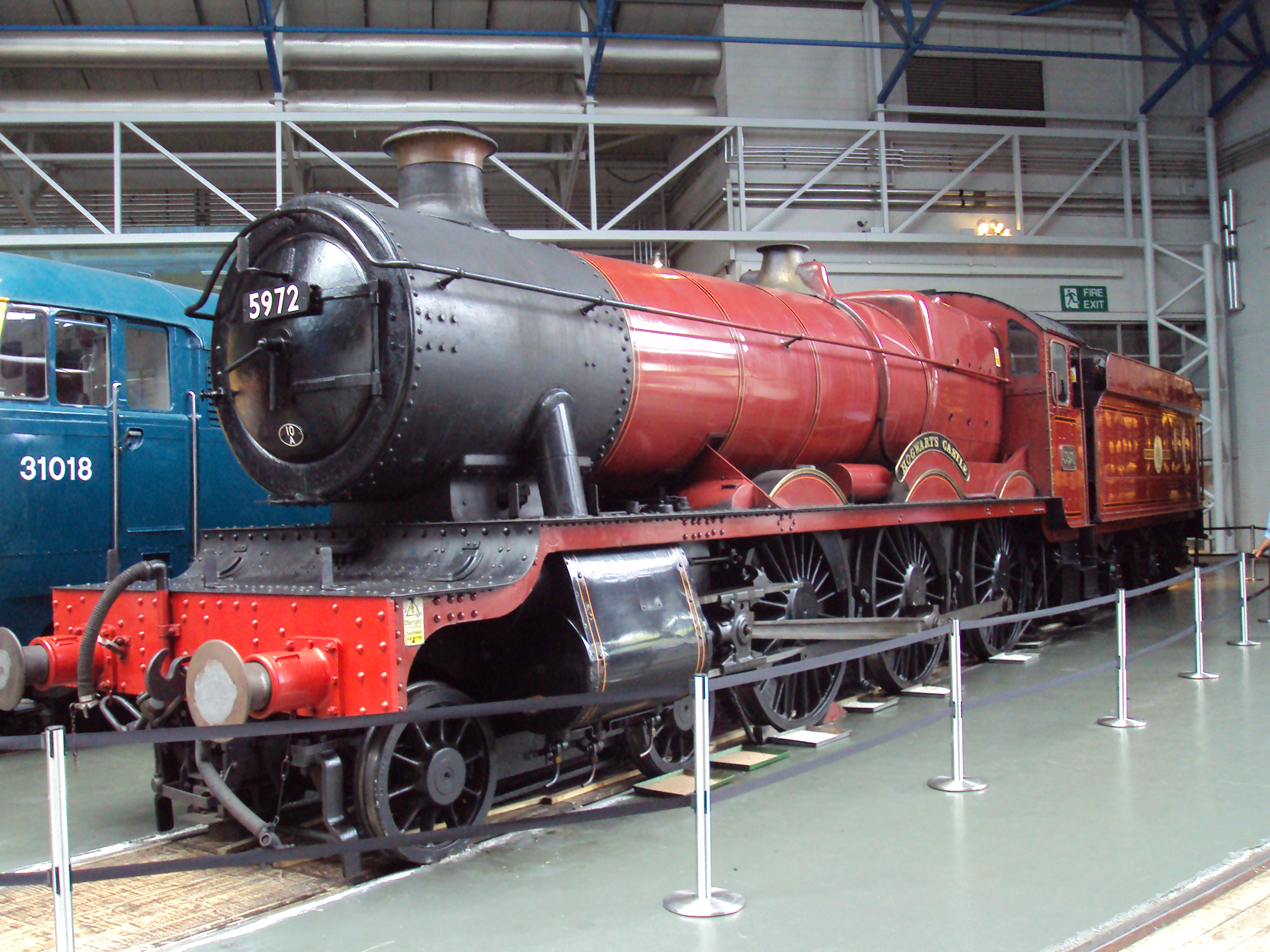
No. 5972 (the locomotive used in the film) on display at the National Railway Museum.

The steam engine used in the film as the Hogwarts Express up until Harry Potter and the Deathly Hallows: Part 2, was GWR 4900 Class 5972 Olton Hall, but it was originally not the first locomotive to be selected as the Hogwarts Express. To promote the books, the Southern Railway locomotive 34027 Taw Valley was repainted and renamed temporarily, but was rejected by director Chris Columbus as looking 'too modern' for the film. The LMS Class 8F No. 48151 had also been considered for the film.

=== Design and special effects ===
Judianna Makovsky served as the costume designer. She re-designed the Quidditch robes, having initially planned to use those shown on the cover of the American book, but deemed them "a mess". Instead, she dressed the Quidditch players in "preppie sweaters, 19th-century fencing breeches and arm guards". Production designer Stuart Craig built the sets at Leavesden Studios, including Hogwarts Great Hall, basing it on many English cathedrals. Although originally asked to use an existing old street to film the Diagon Alley scenes, Craig decided to build his own set, comprising Tudor, Georgian and Queen Anne architecture.

Columbus originally planned to use both animatronics and CGI animation to create the magical creatures, including Fluffy. Nick Dudman, who worked on Star Wars: Episode I – The Phantom Menace, was given the task of creating the needed prosthetics, with Jim Henson's Creature Shop providing creature effects. John Coppinger stated that the magical creatures that needed to be created had to be designed multiple times. The film features nearly 600 special effects shots, involving numerous companies. Industrial Light & Magic created Lord Voldemort's face on the back of Quirrell, Rhythm & Hues animated Norbert (Hagrid's baby dragon); and Sony Pictures Imageworks produced the Quidditch scenes, as well as the effects for the mountain troll, with actor Michael Q. Schmidt serving as reference for the troll's body.

=== Music ===
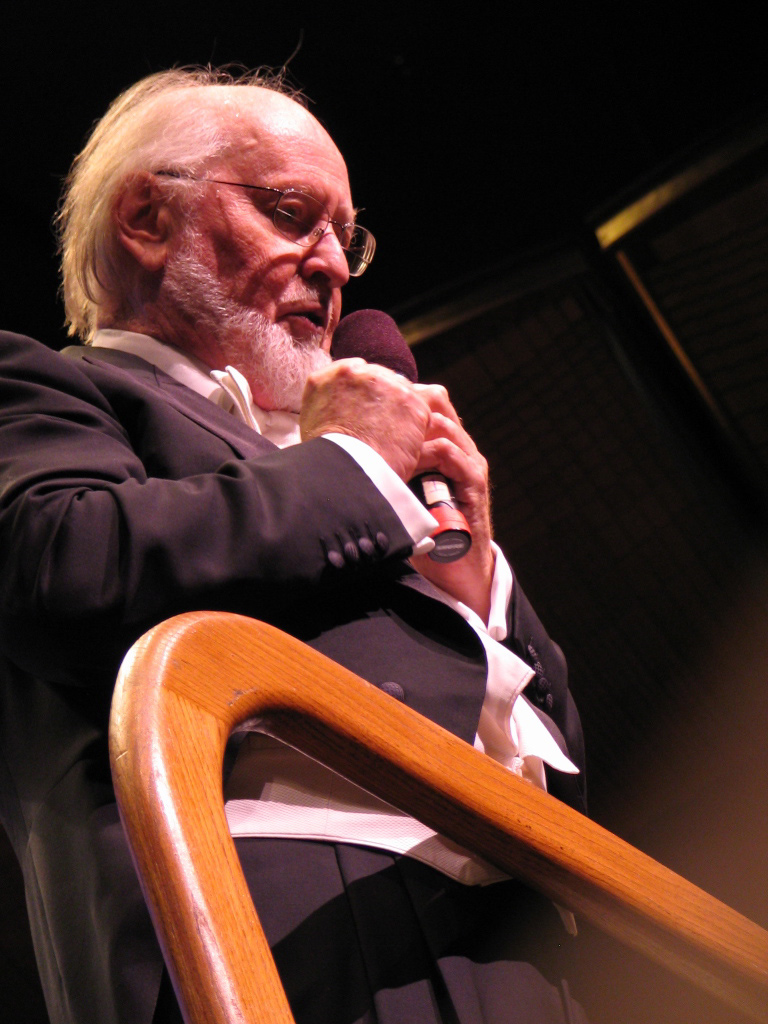
John Williams composed the film's score.

James Horner was initially sought to compose the score, but declined the opportunity. Having previously collaborated with Columbus on the Home Alone films and Stepmom, John Williams was selected to compose the score in August 2000. Williams composed the score at his homes in Los Angeles and Tanglewood before recording it in London in September 2001. One of the main themes is entitled "Hedwig's Theme"; Williams retained it for his finished score as "everyone seemed to like it," and it became a recurring theme throughout the series.

== Differences from the book ==
Columbus repeatedly checked with Rowling to make sure he was getting minor details correct. Kloves described the film as being "really faithful" to the book. He added dialogue, of which Rowling approved. One of the lines originally included had to be removed after Rowling told him that it would directly contradict an event in the then-unreleased fifth Harry Potter novel Harry Potter and the Order of the Phoenix.

Several minor characters were removed from the film version, most prominently Peeves the poltergeist. Rik Mayall was cast, but his scenes were cut and never released. The book's first chapter, told from the viewpoint of Vernon and Petunia Dursley, is absent from the film. Harry and Draco's first encounter in Madam Malkin's robe shop and the midnight duel are not in the film. In the film, the responsibility of taking Norbert away is given to Dumbledore, while in the book, Harry and Hermione have to bring him by hand to Charlie Weasley's friends. This necessitated a change in the detention plotline: in the book, Filch catches Harry and Hermione leaving the Astronomy Tower and puts them in detention with Neville and Malfoy, while in the film, all three protagonists receive detention after Malfoy finds them in Hagrid's hut after hours. According to Kloves, this was "the one part of the book that [Rowling] felt easily could be changed". The Quidditch pitch is altered from a traditional stadium to an open field circled by spectator towers.

The book's timeline is not enforced in the film. In the book, Harry's eleventh birthday is in 1991. On the film set for 4 Privet Drive, Dudley's certificates from primary school bear the year 2001.

== Distribution ==
=== Marketing ===
The first teaser poster of the film was released on 1 December 2000. The first teaser trailer was released via satellite on 2 March 2001 and debuted in cinemas with the release of See Spot Run. A video game based on the film was released on 15 November 2001 by Electronic Arts for several consoles. A port for the game, for the GameCube, PlayStation 2, and Xbox, was released in 2003. Mattel won the rights to produce toys based on the film, to be sold exclusively through Warner Bros. stores. Hasbro also produced products, including confectionery products based on those from the series. Warner Bros. signed a deal worth US$150 million with Coca-Cola to promote the film, although some pegged the deal at $40 million-$50 million worldwide for the movie. Lego produced a series of sets based on buildings and scenes from the film, as well as a Lego Creator video game.

=== Theatrical release ===
Harry Potter and the Philosopher's Stone had its world premiere at the Odeon Leicester Square in London on 4 November 2001, with the cinema arranged to resemble Hogwarts School.

The film had previews in the United Kingdom on 1,137 screens at 491 theatres on 10 and 11 November 2001. It officially opened on 16 November 2001 on 1,168 screens at 507 theatres in the United Kingdom and Ireland; in 3,672 theatres in the United States and Canada. It was the widest release at the time in the United Kingdom and the United States.

=== Home media ===
Harry Potter and the Philosopher's Stone was first released on VHS and DVD on 11 May 2002 in the United Kingdom and 28 May 2002 in the United States. Between May and June 2002, the film sold 10 million copies, almost 60% of which were DVD sales. It would go on to make $19.1 million in rentals, surpassing The Fast and the Furious for having the largest DVD rentals. This record was surpassed by The Bourne Identity in January 2003.

In December 2009, a 4-disc "Ultimate Edition" was released, with seven minutes of deleted scenes added back in, the feature-length special Creating the World of Harry Potter Part 1: The Magic Begins, and a 48-page hardcover booklet. The extended version has a running time of about 159 minutes, which had previously been shown during certain television airings. The film was re-released on DVD as part of the 8-disc Harry Potter: The Complete 8-Film Collection in November 2011, and on Blu-ray as part of the 31-disc Hogwarts Collection in April 2014. It was released on UHD Blu-ray as part of the 16-disc Harry Potter: 8-Film Collection in November 2017.

== Reception ==
=== Box office ===
In the United Kingdom and Ireland, Harry Potter and the Philosopher's Stone grossed a record single day gross of £3.6 million during the first day of previews, beating Toy Story 2's record. It grossed a record £3.1 million for a Sunday, bringing its total to £6.7 million from the previews. It broke the record for the highest-opening weekend ever, both including and excluding previews, making £16.3 million with and £9.6 million without previews ($13.8 million), setting a further record single day gross on the Saturday with £3.99 million. It set another Sunday record with a gross of £3.6 million. It had a record second weekend of £8.4 million. It remained at number one in the UK for five weeks. The film went on to make £66.1 million in the UK alone, making it the country's second-highest-grossing film of all-time (after Titanic), until it was surpassed by Mamma Mia!.

In the United States and Canada, it made $32.3 million on its opening day, breaking the single-day record previously held by Star Wars: Episode I – The Phantom Menace (1999). On the second day of release, the film's gross increased to $33.5 million, breaking the record for biggest single day again. It made $90.3 million during its first weekend, breaking the record for highest-opening weekend of all time that was previously held by The Lost World: Jurassic Park (1997). It held the record until the following May when Spider-Man (2002) made $114.8 million in its opening weekend. Plus, the film broke Batman Forever's record for having the largest opening weekend for a Warner Bros. Pictures film. It would hold this record for two years until it was surpassed by The Matrix Reloaded (2003). Additionally, it shattered other opening records, surpassing Monsters, Inc. for having the biggest November opening weekend, Planet of the Apes for having the largest non-holiday opening weekend, the highest Friday gross and the biggest opening weekend of the year, The Mummy Returns for scoring the highest Saturday gross, Home Alone 2: Lost in New York (1992) for having the highest opening weekend for a Chris Columbus film and Mission: Impossible 2 (2000) for having the largest number of screenings, playing at 3,672 theaters. In just five days, it became the fastest film to approach the $100 million mark. The film grossed $2.3 million in its first two days in Taiwan, giving it a worldwide opening weekend total of $107 million. The film held onto the number 1 spot at the US box office for three consecutive weekends before getting overtaken by Ocean's Eleven. The film also had the highest-grossing 5-day (Wednesday-Sunday) Thanksgiving weekend record of $82.4 million, holding the title for twelve years until both The Hunger Games: Catching Fire (2013) and Frozen (2013) surpassed it with $110.1 million and $94 million respectively. By Christmas, it went on to become the highest-grossing film of the year, dethroning Shrek.

Similar results were achieved across the world. A week after opening in the United States, the film added 15 additional markets and set an opening week record in Germany, grossing $18.7 million. It also set opening records in Austria, Brazil, Denmark, Finland, the Netherlands, Norway, Sweden and German-speaking Switzerland. In the following weekend, after expanding to 31 countries, the film set a record overseas weekend gross of $60.9 million, including record openings in Australia, Greece, Israel, Japan ($12.5 million), New Zealand and Spain. It set another overseas weekend record with $62.3 million from 37 countries the following weekend, including record openings in France, Italy and French-speaking Switzerland. The international opening weekend record would be held for a year until it was given to Star Wars: Episode II – Attack of the Clones (2002). During its theatrical run, the film earned $974 million at the worldwide box office, $317 million of that in the US and $657 million elsewhere, which made it the second-highest-grossing film in history at the time, as well as the year's highest-grossing film. In addition, it went on to become the highest-grossing Warner Bros. film of all time, surpassing Batman (1989) domestically and Twister (1996) worldwide. It is the second-highest-grossing Harry Potter film after Deathly Hallows – Part 2. Box Office Mojo estimates that the film sold over 55.9 million tickets in the US and Canada.

In August 2020, The Philosopher's Stone was re-released in several countries, including a 4K 3D restoration in China, where it earned $26.4 million, for a global $1.026 billion, making it the second film in the series to surpass the billion-dollar mark, after Deathly Hallows – Part 2.

=== Critical response ===
On Rotten Tomatoes, the film has an approval rating of 80% based on 202 reviews, with an average rating of 7.1/10. The site's critical consensus reads, "Harry Potter and the Sorcerer's Stone adapts its source material faithfully while condensing the novel's overstuffed narrative into an involving – and often downright exciting – big-screen magical caper." On Metacritic, the film has a weighted average score of 65 out of 100, based on 36 critics, indicating "generally favorable" reviews. Audiences surveyed by CinemaScore gave the film an average grade of "A" on an A+ to F scale.

Roger Ebert called Philosopher's Stone "a classic," giving the film four out of four stars, and particularly praising the Quidditch scenes' visual effects. Praise was echoed by both The Telegraph and Empire reviewers, with Alan Morrison of the latter naming it the film's "stand-out sequence". Brian Linder of IGN also gave the film a positive review, but concluded that it "isn't perfect, but for me it's a nice supplement to a book series that I love". Although criticising the final half-hour, Jeanne Aufmuth of Palo Alto Online stated that the film would "enchant even the most cynical of moviegoers." USA Today reviewer Claudia Puig gave the film three out of four stars, especially praising the set design and Robbie Coltrane's portrayal of Hagrid, but criticised John Williams' music, stating the "overly insistent score lacks subtlety and bludgeons us with crescendos", and concluded that "ultimately many of the book's readers may wish for a more magical incarnation."

The sets, design, cinematography, effects and principal cast were all given praise from Kirk Honeycutt of The Hollywood Reporter, although he deemed John Williams' score "a great clanging, banging music box that simply will not shut up." Todd McCarthy of Variety compared the film positively with Gone with the Wind and put "The script is faithful, the actors are just right, the sets, costumes, makeup and effects match and sometimes exceed anything one could imagine." Jonathan Foreman of the New York Post recalled that the film was "remarkably faithful," to its literary counterpart as well as a "consistently entertaining if overlong adaptation."

Richard Corliss, of Time magazine, considered the film a "by the numbers adaptation," criticising the pace and the "charisma-free" lead actors. CNN's Paul Tatara found that Columbus and Kloves "are so careful to avoid offending anyone by excising a passage from the book, the so-called narrative is more like a jamboree inside Rowling's head." Ed Gonzalez of Slant Magazine wished that the film had been directed by Tim Burton, finding the cinematography "bland and muggy," and the majority of the film a "solidly dull celebration of dribbling goo." Elvis Mitchell of The New York Times was highly negative about the film, comparing it to "a theme park that's a few years past its prime; the rides clatter and groan with metal fatigue every time they take a curve." He also said it suffered from "a lack of imagination" and wooden characters, adding, "The Sorting Hat ... has more personality than anything else in the movie."

=== Accolades ===
Philosopher's Stone received three Academy Award nominations: Best Art Direction, Best Costume Design, and Best Original Score for John Williams. The film was also nominated for seven BAFTA Awards: Best British Film, Best Supporting Actor for Robbie Coltrane, Best Costume Design, Best Production Design, Best Makeup and Hair, Best Sound, and Best Visual Effects. It won a Saturn Award for Best Costume, and was nominated for eight more awards. It won other awards from the Casting Society of America and the Costume Designers Guild. It was nominated for the AFI Film Award for its special effects, and the Art Directors Guild Award for its production design. It received the Broadcast Film Critics Award for Best Family Film, and was nominated for Best Child Performance (for Daniel Radcliffe) and Best Composer. In 2005, the American Film Institute nominated the film for AFI's 100 Years of Film Scores.

| Award | Date of ceremony | Category | Recipients | Result | Ref. |
|---|---|---|---|---|---|
| Academy Awards | 24 March 2002 | Best Art Direction | Stuart Craig, Stephenie McMillan | Nominated | |
| Academy Awards | 24 March 2002 | Best Costume Design | Judianna Makovsky | Nominated | |
| Academy Awards | 24 March 2002 | Best Original Score | John Williams | Nominated | |
| Amanda Awards | 18 August 2002 | Best Foreign Feature Film | Harry Potter and the Philosopher's Stone | Nominated | |
| American Film Institute Awards | 5 January 2002 | Best Digital Effects Artist | Robert Legato, Nick Davis, Roger Guyett | Nominated | |
| ADG Excellence in Production Design Award | 24 February 2002 | Excellence in Production Design for a Period or Fantasy Film | Stuart Craig, John King, Neil Lamont, Andrew Ackland-Snow, Peter Francis, Michael Lamont, Simon Lamont, Steve Lawrence, Lucinda Thomson, Stephen Morahan, Dominic Masters, Gary Tomkins | Nominated | |
| British Academy Film Awards | 24 February 2002 | Best British Film | Harry Potter and the Philosopher's Stone | Nominated | |
| British Academy Film Awards | 24 February 2002 | Best Supporting Actor | Robbie Coltrane | Nominated | |
| British Academy Film Awards | 24 February 2002 | Best Costume Design | Judianna Makovsky | Nominated | |
| British Academy Film Awards | 24 February 2002 | Best Production Design | Stuart Craig | Nominated | |
| British Academy Film Awards | 24 February 2002 | Best Makeup and Hair | Nick Dudman, Eithne Fennel, Amanda Knight | Nominated | |
| British Academy Film Awards | 24 February 2002 | Best Sound | Graham Daniel, Adam Daniel, Ray Merrin, John Midgley, Eddy Joseph | Nominated | |
| British Academy Film Awards | 24 February 2002 | Best Visual Effects | Robert Legato, Nick Davis, John Richardson, Roger Guyett, Jim Berney | Nominated | |
| Broadcast Film Critics Association Award | 11 January 2002 | Best Family Film | Harry Potter and the Philosopher's Stone | Won | |
| Broadcast Film Critics Association Award | 11 January 2002 | Best Child Performance | Daniel Radcliffe | Nominated | |
| Broadcast Film Critics Association Award | 11 January 2002 | Best Composer | John Williams | Nominated | |
| Broadcast Music Incorporated Film & TV Awards | 15 May 2002 | BMI Film Music Award | John Williams | Won | |
| Casting Society of America | 17 October 2002 | Feature Film Casting – Comedy | Janet Hirshenson, Jane Jenkins | Won | |
| Costume Designers Guild Award | March 16, 2002 | Excellence in Period/Fantasy Film | Judianna Makovsky | Won | |
| American Cinema Editors | 24 February 2002 | Best Edited Feature Film – Dramatic | Richard Francis-Bruce | Nominated | |
| Empire Awards | 5 February 2002 | Best Film | Harry Potter and the Philosopher's Stone | Nominated | |
| Empire Awards | 5 February 2002 | Best Debut | Daniel Radcliffe, Rupert Grint, and Emma Watson | Nominated | |
| Evening Standard British Film Awards | 2 March 2002 | Technical Achievement Award | Stuart Craig | Won | |
| Golden Reel Awards | 23 March 2002 | Best Sound Editing – Foreign Film | Eddy Joseph, Martin Cantwell, Nick Lowe, Colin Ritchie, Peter Holt | Nominated | |
| Grammy Awards | 23 February 2003 | Best Score Soundtrack Album for a Motion Picture, Television or Other Visual Media | John Williams | Nominated | |
| Grammy Awards | 23 February 2003 | Best Instrumental Composition | John Williams (for "Hedwig's Theme") | Nominated | |
| Hugo Awards | 29 August–2 September 2002 | Best Dramatic Presentation | Harry Potter and the Philosopher's Stone | Nominated | |
| Japan Academy Film Prize | 8 March 2002 | Outstanding Foreign Language Film | Harry Potter and the Philosopher's Stone | Nominated | |
| Nickelodeon Kids' Choice Awards | 20 April 2002 | Favorite Movie | Harry Potter and the Philosopher's Stone | Nominated | |
| MTV Movie Awards | 1 June 2002 | Breakthrough Male Performance | Daniel Radcliffe | Nominated | |
| Producers Guild of America Awards | 3 March 2002 | Producer of the Year Award in Theatrical Motion Pictures | David Heyman | Nominated | |
| Satellite Awards | 19 January 2002 | Best Motion Picture, Animated or Mixed Media | Harry Potter and the Philosopher's Stone | Nominated | |
| Satellite Awards | 19 January 2002 | Best Editing | Richard Francis-Bruce | Nominated | |
| Satellite Awards | 19 January 2002 | Best Art Direction | Stuart Craig | Nominated | |
| Satellite Awards | 19 January 2002 | Best Visual Effects | Robert Legato, Nick Davis, Roger Guyett, John Richardson | Nominated | |
| Satellite Awards | 19 January 2002 | Outstanding New Talent | Rupert Grint | Won | |
| Saturn Awards | 10 June 2002 | Best Fantasy Film | Harry Potter and the Philosopher's Stone | Nominated | |
| Saturn Awards | 10 June 2002 | Best Director | Chris Columbus | Nominated | |
| Saturn Awards | 10 June 2002 | Best Supporting Actor | Robbie Coltrane | Nominated | |
| Saturn Awards | 10 June 2002 | Supporting Actress | Maggie Smith | Nominated | |
| Saturn Awards | 10 June 2002 | Best Performance by a Younger Actor | Daniel Radcliffe | Nominated | |
| Saturn Awards | 10 June 2002 | Best Performance by a Younger Actor | Emma Watson | Nominated | |
| Saturn Awards | 10 June 2002 | Best Costume | Judianna Makovsky | Won | |
| Saturn Awards | 10 June 2002 | Best Make-up | Nick Dudman, Mark Coulier, John Lambert | Nominated | |
| Saturn Awards | 10 June 2002 | Best Special Effects | Robert Legato, Nick Davis, Roger Guyett, John Richardson | Nominated | |
| Stinkers Bad Movie Awards | 2002 | Most Intrusive Musical Score | Harry Potter and the Philosopher's Stone | Nominated | |
| Teen Choice Awards | 19 August 2002 | Choice Movie – Drama/Action Adventure | Harry Potter and the Philosopher's Stone | Nominated | |
| Young Artist Awards | 7 April 2002 | Best Family Feature Film – Drama | Harry Potter and the Philosopher's Stone | Nominated | |
| Young Artist Awards | 7 April 2002 | Best Performance in a Feature Film – Leading Young Actress | Emma Watson (tied with Scarlett Johansson) | Won | |
| Young Artist Awards | 7 April 2002 | Best Performance in a Feature Film – Supporting Young Actor | Tom Felton | Nominated | |
| Young Artist Awards | 7 April 2002 | Best Ensemble in a Feature Film | Harry Potter and the Philosopher's Stone | Nominated | |
| Young Artist Awards | 7 April 2002 | Most Promising Young Newcomer | Rupert Grint | Won | |

== See also ==
- List of films about witchcraft

== Works cited ==
- Rowling, J. K. "F.A.Q." J. K. Rowling Official Site. Archived from the original on 11 September 2007.
