= Richard Hornung =

American production designer (1950–1995)

- Born: February 16, 1950; Bethlehem, Pennsylvania, U.S
- Died: December 30, 1995 (aged 45); Los Angeles, California, U.S
- Occupation: Costume designer
- Years active: 1987-1995

Richard Hornung (February 16, 1950 – December 30, 1995) was an American costume designer best known for his work with the Coen brothers on films such as The Hudsucker Proxy, Raising Arizona, and Barton Fink for which he was nominated for an Oscar.

His other credits include Broadway shows Sunday in the Park With George, Brighton Beach Memoirs, The News (musical), and Candida (play).

== Life and career ==
He was born in Bethlehem, Pennsylvania on February 16, 1950. He was an Allentown, Pennsylvania native.

Hornung graduated from Kutztown University of Pennsylvania. He later received a master's degree in costume design from the University of Illinois at Urbana–Champaign.

Prior to becoming a costume designer, he was a substitute English teacher. When he moved to New York City, he worked for various theaters, including regional, Off-Broadway, On-Broadway, and the Juilliard Drama School.

He has mentored costume designers such as Mark Bridges and Mary Zophres. Zophres has since taken over as the Coen Brother's main costume designer.

He died of AIDS on December 30, 1995.

== Selected filmography ==
Year	Title	Director
1987	Raising Arizona	Coen brothers
1987	Less than Zero	Marek Kanievska
1988	Patty Hearst	Paul Schrader
1988	Young Guns	Christopher Cain
1990	Miller's Crossing	Joel Coen
1990	The Grifters	Stephen Frears
1991	Barton Fink	Joel Coen
1992	Light Sleeper	Paul Schrader
1992	Hero	Stephen Frears
1993	This Boy's Life	Michael Caton-Jones
1993	Dave	Ivan Reitman
1994	The Hudsucker Proxy	Coen brothers
1994	Natural Born Killers	Oliver Stone
1995	Nixon	Oliver Stone
1996	City Hall	Harold Becker
