= 1st Costume Designers Guild Awards =

Award ceremony for film and television costuming in 1998

- Date: February 6, 1999
- Location: The Beverly Hills Hotel, Beverly Hills, California
- Country: United States
- Presented by: Costume Designers Guild
- Hosted by: Angelica Huston

Highlights
- Excellence in Film: Pleasantville – Judianna Makovsky
- Excellence in Television: The Tempest – Van Broughton Ramsey

The 1st Costume Designers Guild Awards, honoring excellence in film and television costume design for 1998, were held on February 6, 1999, at The Beverly Hills Hotel in Beverly Hills, California, and hosted by Anjelica Huston.

The CDG statues designed by the Guild member David Le Vey reflect elements of both neoclassicism and the glamour of 1940's Hollywood surrealism. Italian luxury fashion house BVLGARI was commissioned to create the trophies in sterling silver.

== Winners and nominees ==
Winners are listed first and in bold.

Excellence in Film	Excellence in Television
**Pleasantville – Judianna Makovsky**; Beloved – Colleen Atwood; The Man in the Iron Mask – James Acheson; The Mask of Zorro – Graciela Mazon; The Truman Show – Marilyn Matthews	**The Tempest – Van Broughton Ramsey**; From the Earth to the Moon – Chrisi Karvonides-Dushenko; Gia – Robert Turturice; George Wallace – May Routh; Winchell – Hope Hanafin

=== Special awards ===
==== Career Achievement Award ====
- Albert Wolsky (film)
- Bob Mackie (television)

==== Distinguished Director Award ====
- Paul Mazursky

==== Hall of Fame ====
- Adrian
- Travis Banton
- Edith Head
- Dorothy Jeakins
- Irene Sharaff
