= 15th Costume Designers Guild Awards =

Award ceremony for film and television costuming in 2012

- Date: February 19, 2013
- Location: The Beverly Hilton, Beverly Hills, California
- Country: United States
- Presented by: Costume Designers Guild
- Hosted by: Joel McHale

Highlights
- Excellence in Contemporary Film: Skyfall – Jany Temime
- Excellence in Fantasy Film: Mirror Mirror – Eiko Ishioka
- Excellence in Period Film: Anna Karenina – Jacqueline Durran

The 15th Costume Designers Guild Awards, honoring the best costume designs in film, television, and media for 2012, was held on February 19, 2013. The nominees were announced on January 17, 2013.

== Winners and nominees ==
The winners are in bold.

=== Film ===
Excellence in Contemporary Film	Excellence in Period Film
**Skyfall – Jany Temime**; Beasts of the Southern Wild – Stephani Lewis; The Best Exotic Marigold Hotel – Louise Stjernsward; Silver Linings Playbook – Mark Bridges; Zero Dark Thirty – George L. Little	**Anna Karenina – Jacqueline Durran**; Argo – Jacqueline West; Les Misérables – Paco Delgado; Lincoln – Joanna Johnston; Moonrise Kingdom – Kasia Walicka-Maimone
Excellence in Fantasy Film
**Mirror Mirror – Eiko Ishioka** (posthumous); Cloud Atlas – Kym Barrett and Pierre-Yves Gayraud; The Hobbit: An Unexpected Journey – Bob Buck, Ann Maskrey and Richard Taylor; The Hunger Games – Judianna Makovsky; Snow White and the Huntsman – Colleen Atwood

=== Television ===
Outstanding Contemporary Television	Outstanding Period/Fantasy Television
**Smash – Molly Maginnis**; Girls – Jennifer Rogien; Nashville – Susie DeSanto; Revenge – Jill M. Ohanneson; Treme – Alonzo Wilson and Ann Walters	**Downton Abbey – Caroline McCall**; Boardwalk Empire – John Dunn and Lisa Padovani; Game of Thrones – Michele Clapton
Outstanding Made for Television Movie or Miniseries
**American Horror Story: Asylum – Lou Eyrich**; Hatfields & McCoys – Karri Hutchinson; Hemingway & Gellhorn – Ruth Myers

=== Commercial ===
Excellence in Commercial Design
- **Captain Morgan Black – Judianna Makovsky**
  - Capital One: "Couture" – Roseanne Fiedler
  - Dos Equis: "The Most Interesting Man in the World" – Julie Vogel

=== Special awards ===
==== Career Achievement Award ====
- Judianna Makovsky (film)
- Eduardo Castro (television)

==== LACOSTE Spotlight Award ====
- Anne Hathaway

==== Distinguished Collaborator Award ====
- Lorne Michaels

==== Distinguished Service Award ====
- David LeVey
