= 4th Costume Designers Guild Awards =

Award ceremony for film and television costuming in 2001

- Date: March 16, 2002
- Location: The Beverly Hills Hotel, Beverly Hills, California
- Country: United States
- Presented by: Costume Designers Guild
- Hosted by: Anjelica Huston

Highlights
- Excellence in Contemporary Film: The Royal Tenenbaums – Karen Patch
- Excellence in Period/Fantasy Film: Harry Potter and the Sorcerer's Stone – Judianna Makovsky

The 4th Costume Designers Guild Awards, given on March 16, 2002, honored the best costume designs in film and television for 2001. The nominees were announced on January 28, 2002.

== Winners and nominees ==
The winners are in bold.

=== Film ===
Excellence in Contemporary Film	Excellence in Period/Fantasy Film
**The Royal Tenenbaums – Karen Patch**; Legally Blonde – Sophie De Rakoff Carbonell; Mulholland Drive – Amy Stofsky; Ocean's Eleven – Jeffrey Kurland	**Harry Potter and the Sorcerer's Stone – Judianna Makovsky**; Blow – Mark Bridges; Hedwig and the Angry Inch – Arianne Phillips; Planet of the Apes – Colleen Atwood

=== Television ===
Excellence in Contemporary Television	Excellence in Period/Fantasy Television
**The Sopranos – Juliet Polcsa**; Sex and the City – Patricia Field; Six Feet Under – Mark Bridges ("Pilot"); Gail McMullen (Series); Will & Grace – Lori Eskowitz-Carter	**Life with Judy Garland: Me and My Shadows – Dona Granata**; 61* – Dan Moore; The Lot – Jean-Pierre Dorleac; The Tick – Victoria Auth

=== Special awards ===
==== Career Achievement Award ====
- Theadora Van Runkle (film)
- Ret Turner (television)

==== Hall of Fame ====
- Helen Rose
