= Mark Bridges (costume designer) =

American costume designer

- Born: Niagara Falls, New York
- Education: Stony Brook University (BA); New York University (MFA)

Mark Bridges is an American costume designer. He has frequently collaborated with Paul Thomas Anderson for each of his films. Bridges has been nominated four times for the Academy Award for Best Costume Design, winning two for The Artist (2011) and Phantom Thread (2017). For the latter, he won a Jet Ski and a stay in Lake Havasu City, Arizona resort, as a part of the Academy Awards telecast stunt to award the Oscar recipient who gave the shortest acceptance speech. His other awards include two BAFTA Awards for Best Costume Design for his designs for The Artist and Phantom Thread.

== Personal life ==
Bridges was born in Niagara Falls, New York. He was a student for the theater club at La Salle High School. Bridges studied theater at Niagara County Community College and received a Bachelor of Arts in Theater Arts from Stony Brook University in 1983. After graduating, he moved to New York City to start working as a fabric shopper on Broadway for Barbara Matera Ltd. For the next few years, he worked on various theatrical productions, including Oh! Calcutta! and Dreamgirls, while attending graduate school at New York University. He graduated with a Master of Fine Arts degree in Costume Design from the Tisch School of the Arts of New York University in 1987.

== Career ==
Bridges moved to Los Angeles and was asked to work as a costume assistant for Richard Hornung. Bridges won two Academy Awards for Best Costume Designer for The Artist and Phantom Thread. At the 90th Academy Awards, Jimmy Kimmel offered as a prize for the shortest acceptance speech a Jet Ski and trip to Lake Havasu. Kimmel announced Bridges as the winner since his speech was the shortest at 35 seconds. Helen Mirren and Bridges were shown on the jet ski at the end of the ceremony.

== Filmography ==
=== Film ===
Year	Title	Director	Notes
1990	Miller's Crossing	Joel Coen	costume assistant
1990	The Grifters	Stephen Frears	assistant costume designer
1991	Barton Fink	Joel Coen	assistant costume designer
1991	Doc Hollywood	Michael Caton-Jones	assistant costume designer
1992	Waxwork II: Lost in Time	Anthony Hickox	
1992	Hero	Stephen Frears	assistant costume designer
1993	Robot Wars	Albert Band	
1993	Prehysteria!	Albert Band; Charles Band; David DeCoteau	
1993	Remote	Ted Nicolaou	
1993	Dollman vs. Demonic Toys	Charles Band	
1993	Dave	Ivan Reitman	assistant costume designer
1994	Trancers 5: Sudden Deth	David Nutter	
1994	The Hudsucker Proxy	Joel Coen; Ethan Coen	assistant costume designer
1994	Natural Born Killers	Oliver Stone	assistant costume designer
1994	Pet Shop	Hope Perello	
1995	Children of the Corn III: Urban Harvest	James D. R. Hickox	wardrobe supervisor
1995	Nixon	Oliver Stone	assistant costume designer
1996	Hard Eight	Paul Thomas Anderson	
1997	Living in Peril	Jack Ersgard	
1997	Boogie Nights	Paul Thomas Anderson	
1998	Can't Hardly Wait	Deborah Kaplan; Harry Elfont	
1998	Thursday	Skip Woods	
1999	Blast from the Past	Hugh Wilson	
1999	Deep Blue Sea	Renny Harlin	
1999	Magnolia	Paul Thomas Anderson	also production designer
2000	Cirque du Soleil Journey of Man	Keith Melton	
2001	Beyond the Pale	Paul Warner	
2001	Blow	Ted Demme	
2002	Punch-Drunk Love	Paul Thomas Anderson	
2003	8 Mile	Curtis Hanson	
2003	The Italian Job	F. Gary Gray	
2004	I Heart Huckabees	David O. Russell	
2005	Be Cool	F. Gary Gray	
2006	Fur	Steven Shainberg	
2007	There Will Be Blood	Paul Thomas Anderson	
2008	Yes Man	Peyton Reed	
2009	Land of the Lost	Brad Silberling	
2010	Greenberg	Noah Baumbach	
2010	The Fighter	David O. Russell	
2011	The Artist	Michel Hazanavicius	
2012	The Master	Paul Thomas Anderson	
2012	Silver Linings Playbook	David O. Russell	
2013	Captain Phillips	Paul Greengrass	
2014	Inherent Vice	Paul Thomas Anderson	
2015	Fifty Shades of Grey	Sam Taylor-Johnson	
2016	Jason Bourne	Paul Greengrass	
2017	Phantom Thread	Paul Thomas Anderson	
2019	Joker	Todd Phillips	
2019	Marriage Story	Noah Baumbach	
2020	News of the World	Paul Greengrass	
2021	Licorice Pizza	Paul Thomas Anderson	
2022	The Fabelmans	Steven Spielberg	
2023	Maestro	Bradley Cooper	
2025	The Lost Bus	Paul Greengrass	

=== Television ===
Year	Title	Notes
1990	Dream On	assistant costume designer 4 episodes
2003	Miss Match	Unknown episodes
2008	Swingtown	Episode: "Pilot"
2016	Vinyl	Episode: "Pilot"

== Awards and nominations ==
Year	Association	Category	Project	Result
2001	Costume Designers Guild Awards	Excellence in Period/Fantasy Film	Blow	Nominated
2010	Costume Designers Guild Awards	Excellence in Period Film	The Fighter	Nominated
2011	Academy Awards	Best Costume Design	The Artist	Won
2011	BAFTA Awards	Best Costume Design	The Artist	Won
2011	César Awards	Best Costume Design	The Artist	Nominated
2011	Costume Designers Guild Awards	Excellence in Period Film	The Artist	Nominated
2011	Critics' Choice Awards	Best Costume Design	The Artist	Won
2011	Satellite Awards	Best Costume Design	The Artist	Nominated
2012	Costume Designers Guild Awards	Excellence in Contemporary Film	Silver Linings Playbook	Nominated
2014	Academy Awards	Best Costume Design	Inherent Vice	Nominated
2014	Costume Designers Guild Awards	Excellence in Period Film	Inherent Vice	Nominated
2014	Critics' Choice Awards	Best Costume Design	Inherent Vice	Nominated
2014	London Film Critics' Circle Awards	Technical Achievement Award	Inherent Vice	Nominated
2017	Academy Awards	Best Costume Design	Phantom Thread	Won
2017	BAFTA Awards	Best Costume Design	Phantom Thread	Won
2017	Costume Designers Guild Awards	Excellence in Period Film	Phantom Thread	Nominated
2017	Critics' Choice Awards	Best Costume Design	Phantom Thread	Won
2017	London Film Critics' Circle Awards	Technical Achievement Award	Phantom Thread	Nominated
2017	San Diego Film Critics Society Awards	Best Costume Design	Phantom Thread	Won
2017	Satellite Awards	Best Costume Design	Phantom Thread	Won
2017	Seattle Film Critics Society Awards	Best Costume Design	Phantom Thread	Won
2019	Academy Awards	Best Costume Design	Joker	Nominated
2019	Hollywood Critics Association Awards	Best Costume Design	Joker	Nominated
2019	Satellite Awards	Best Costume Design	Joker	Nominated
2022	St. Louis Film Critics Association Awards	Best Costume Design	The Fabelmans	Nominated
2023	Costume Designers Guild Awards	Excellence in Period Film	Maestro	Nominated
