= 21st Costume Designers Guild Awards =

Award ceremony for film and television costuming in 2018

- Date: February 19, 2019
- Location: The Beverly Hilton, Beverly Hills, California
- Country: United States
- Presented by: Costume Designers Guild
- Hosted by: Kate Walsh

Highlights
- Excellence in Contemporary Film: Crazy Rich Asians – Mary E. Vogt
- Excellence in Period Film: The Favourite – Sandy Powell
- Excellence in Sci-Fi/Fantasy Film: Black Panther – Ruth E. Carter

The 21st Costume Designers Guild Awards, honoring the best costume designs in film and television for 2018, took place on February 19, 2019. The nominees were announced on January 9, 2019.

== Winners and nominees ==
The winners are in bold.

=== Film ===
Excellence in Contemporary Film	Excellence in Period Film
**Crazy Rich Asians – Mary E. Vogt**; Mamma Mia! Here We Go Again – Michele Clapton; Ocean's 8 – Sarah Edwards; Red Sparrow – Trish Summerville; A Star Is Born – Erin Benach; Widows – Jenny Eagan	**The Favourite – Sandy Powell**; BlacKkKlansman – Marci Rodgers; Bohemian Rhapsody – Julian Day; Mary Poppins Returns – Sandy Powell; Mary Queen of Scots – Alexandra Byrne
Excellence in Sci-Fi/Fantasy Film
**Black Panther – Ruth E. Carter**; Aquaman – Kym Barrett; Avengers: Infinity War – Judianna Makovsky; The Nutcracker and the Four Realms – Jenny Beavan; A Wrinkle in Time – Paco Delgado

=== Television ===
Excellence in Contemporary Television	Excellence in Period Television
**The Assassination of Gianni Versace: American Crime Story – Lou Eyrich and Allison Leach**; Grace and Frankie – Allyson B. Fanger; The Romanoffs – Janie Bryant and Wendy Chuck; Sharp Objects – Alix Friedberg; This Is Us – Hala Bahmet	**The Marvelous Mrs. Maisel – Donna Zakowska**; The Alienist – Michael Kaplan; GLOW – Beth Morgan; The Man in the High Castle – Catherine Adair; Outlander – Nina Ayres and Terry Dresbach
Excellence in Sci-Fi/Fantasy Television	Excellence in Variety, Reality-Competition, Live Television
**Westworld – Sharen Davis**; American Horror Story: Apocalypse – Paula Bradley and Lou Eyrich; The Handmaid's Tale – Ane Crabtree; A Series of Unfortunate Events – Cynthia Summers; Star Trek: Discovery – Gersha Phillips	**RuPaul's Drag Race – Zaldy**; Jesus Christ Superstar Live in Concert – Paul Tazewell; The Late Late Show with James Corden – Lauren Shapiro; Saturday Night Live – Tom Broecker and Eric Justian; So You Think You Can Dance – Marina Toybina

=== Short Form ===
Excellence in Short Form Design
- **Childish Gambino: "This Is America" music video – Natasha Newman-Thomas**
  - Adidas: "See My Creativity" commercial – Bonnie Stauch
  - Elton John: "Farewell Yellow Brick Road: The Legacy" short film – Charlie Altuna
  - Justin Timberlake: "Supplies" music video – Ami Goodheart
  - Nespresso: "The Quest" commercial – Jenny Eagan
  - Star Trek: Short Treks: "The Brightest Star" – Gersha Phillips

=== Special awards ===
==== Career Achievement Award ====
- Ruth E. Carter

==== Spotlight Award ====
- Glenn Close

==== Distinguished Collaborator Award ====
- Ryan Murphy

==== Distinguished Service Award ====
- Betty Pecha Madden
