= James Acheson =

British costume designer (born 1946)

- Born: 13 March 1946 (age 80); Leicester, Leicestershire, England
- Education: Colchester Royal Grammar School; Wimbledon School of Art
- Occupation: Costume designer
- Years active: 1973–present

James Acheson (born 13 March 1946) is a British costume designer. He has designed costumes and sets for television, theatre, opera, ballet and film, working in more than 14 different countries.

== Early life ==
Acheson was educated at Colchester Royal Grammar School and studied at Wimbledon School of Art.

== Career ==
=== Television ===
Acheson started working in BBC Television, where he designed the costumes and monsters for 36 episodes of Doctor Who during the eras of the Third Doctor and the Fourth Doctor, including establishing the costume for the Fourth Doctor, played by Tom Baker. Upon creating the look for this character, Acheson purchased the wool for what is now known as the Doctor's signature extra-long scarf. As it was told by Acheson himself, a close friend who accepted the favour of knitting the scarf used the entirety of Acheson's wool. While it was never Acheson's intention for the scarf to be of such a length, it has been reported that he had drawn inspiration for the look from a poster by Toulouse-Lautrec. Acheson is also to credit for the first ever versions of the First and Second Doctors' outfits to be shown on colour television. Acheson played a crucial part in creating the costumes that appeared in serials such as The Mutants (1972), The Time Monster (1972), The Three Doctors (1972–73), Carnival of Monsters (1973), Robot (1974–75), Terror of the Zygons (1975), The Masque of Mandragora (1976) and The Deadly Assassin (1976). Acheson used materials such as fibreglass and latex rubber and molded plastic.

Acheson's other work for the BBC included designing the six episodes of the television adaptation of The Prince and the Pauper in 1976.

=== Films ===
Acheson's film work includes Time Bandits (1981) and Brazil (1985), both directed by Terry Gilliam, Monty Python's The Meaning of Life (1983) and The Wind in the Willows (1996), directed by Terry Jones, Highlander (1986), directed by Russel Mulcahy, The Man in the Iron Mask (1998), directed by Randall Wallace and Mary Shelley's Frankenstein (1994), directed by Kenneth Branagh.

For Highlander, he fashioned a traditional looking Scottish kilt for Christopher Lambert's character to wear. While working on the film The Last Emperor (1987) his team of makers, including cutter Annie Hadley, created costumes for 10,000 cast members in a period of 26 weeks.

In the early 1990s, Acheson returned to work with his The Last Emperor director, Bernardo Bertolucci, on The Sheltering Sky and the film Little Buddha, serving as both costume designer and production designer of the artistic project.

Acheson gained his experience working on superhero films by signing on for the first three Spider-Man movies, directed by Sam Raimi as well as Man of Steel (2013) directed by Zack Snyder.

Film director Sam Raimi refers to Acheson as a visionary designer. Actor Alfred Molina credits Acheson for working with him on creating a comfortable, yet realistic costume for his Doc Ock character.

In an interview, Acheson admitted that a challenging part of his work is having to work with materials that are not easy to manipulate. Acheson has made materials such as plastic serve as lace for the low budgeted Restoration, directed by Michael Hoffman. Acheson has admitted that the materials he used on films such as Spider-Man and Man of Steel were challenging yet fascinating.

=== Theatre ===
Acheson's theatre work includes Hamlet in London and on Broadway starring Ralph Fiennes and directed by Jonathan Kent, and The Marriage of Figaro in both Vienna and at The Metropolitan Opera, directed by Sir Jonathan Miller.

=== Ballet ===
For the Royal New Zealand Ballet he designed both sets and costumes for a new production of Prokofiev's, Romeo and Juliet choreographed by Francesco Ventriglia.

=== Awards ===
Acheson is a three-time Academy Award winner for Costume Design for his work on the films The Last Emperor, directed by Bernardo Bertolucci, Dangerous Liaisons, directed by Stephen Frears and Restoration, directed by Michael Hoffman. Acheson won a BAFTA award for his work as costume designer on The Last Emperor. James was recognized with a Costume Designers Guild Career Achievement Award in 2004. In 2006, Acheson was one of the first three costume designers to ever have been awarded by the Rodeo Drive Walk of Style.

== Influences ==
Acheson's favorite costume designer and inspiration while working on historical films is Italian Piero Tosi.

Acheson has also mentioned taking a liking to the work of fellow Oscar winner, American Colleen Atwood, for films such as Snow White and the Huntsman. Acheson applauds Atwood for having a large range of work.
