= Costume Designers Guild Award for Excellence in Period/Fantasy Television =

Discontinued CDG TV award

The Costume Designers Guild Award for Excellence in Period/Fantasy Television was presented annually by the Costume Designers Guild from 1999 to 2014.

In 1998, the Guild introduced a single award category titled Excellence in Television, in which all television programs competed regardless of genre or format. Among the inaugural nominees, four were period dramas. The winner that year was The Tempest, a fantasy television film. Furthermore, all nominated shows were either limited series or television films, which makes it the only time with no regularly continued series recognized. Beginning with the 1999 ceremony, the Guild divided the award into two categories: Excellence in Contemporary Television and Excellence in Period/Fantasy Television. In 2015, the latter was further separated into two distinct categories: Excellence in Period Television and Excellence in Fantasy Television, each recognizing achievement within its respective genre.

== Winners and nominees ==
=== 1990s ===
Excellence in Television

Year	Series	Costume Designer(s)	Network
1998	The Tempest	Van Broughton Ramsey	NBC
1998	From the Earth to the Moon	Chrisi Karvonides-Dushenko	HBO
1998	George Wallace	May Routh	TNT
1998	Gia	Robert Turturice	HBO
1998	Winchell	Hope Hanafin	HBO

Excellence in Period/Fantasy Television

Year	Series	Costume Designer(s)	Network
1999	Annie	Shay Cunliffe	ABC
1999	A Lesson Before Dying	Hope Hanafin	HBO
1999	The Magnificent Seven	Dan Moore	CBS
1999	Sarah, Plain and Tall: Winter's End	Van Broughton Ramsey	CBS
1999	That '70s Show	Melina Root	Fox

=== 2000s ===
Year	Series	Costume Designer(s)	Network
2000	Geppetto	Hope Hanafin	ABC
2000	Freaks and Geeks	Debra McGuire	NBC
2000	Jackie Bouvier Kennedy Onassis	Carol Ramsey	CBS
2000	That '70s Show	Melina Root	Fox
2001	Life with Judy Garland: Me and My Shadows	Dona Granata	ABC
2001	61*	Dan Moore	HBO
2001	The Lot	Jean-Pierre Dorleac	AMC
2001	The Tick	Victoria J. Auth	Fox
2002	American Dreams	Jane Anderson	NBC
2002	Fidel	Mayes C. Rubeo	Showtime
2002	The Rosa Parks Story	Karen Perry	CBS
2002	That '70s Show	Melina Root	Fox
2003	Carnivàle	Ruth Myers ("Pilot"); Terry Dresbach (Series)	HBO
2003	And Starring Pancho Villa as Himself	Eduardo Castro	HBO
2003	Angels in America	Ann Roth	HBO
2003	Hitler: The Rise of Evil	Maria Schicker	CBS
2004	The Life and Death of Peter Sellers	Jill Taylor	HBO
2004	Cold Case	Patia Prouty	CBS
2004	Deadwood	Janie Bryant	HBO
2004	Iron Jawed Angels	Caroline Harris	HBO
2004	The Lion in Winter	Consolata Boyle	Showtime
2005	Rome	April Ferry	HBO
2005	Carnivàle	Chrisi Karvonides-Dushenko	HBO
2005	Cold Case	Patia Prouty	CBS
2005	Deadwood	Janie Bryant	HBO
2005	That '70s Show	Melina Root	Fox
2006	Rome	April Ferry	HBO
2006	Cold Case	Patia Prouty and Maria Schicker	CBS
2006	Deadwood	Janie Bryant	HBO
2007	Pushing Daisies	Robert Blackman	ABC
2007	Rome	April Ferry	HBO
2007	The Tudors	Joan Bergin	Showtime
2008	Mad Men	Janie Bryant	AMC
2008	Pushing Daisies	Robert Blackman	ABC
2008	The Tudors	Joan Bergin	Showtime
2009	Mad Men	Janie Bryant	AMC
2009	True Blood	Audrey Fisher	HBO
2009	The Tudors	Joan Bergin	Showtime

=== 2010s ===
Year	Series	Costume Designer(s)	Network
2010	Boardwalk Empire	John Dunn and Lisa Padovani	HBO
2010	Mad Men	Janie Bryant	AMC
2010	The Tudors	Joan Bergin	Showtime
2011	Boardwalk Empire	John Dunn and Lisa Padovani	HBO
2011	The Borgias	Gabriella Pescucci	Showtime
2011	Game of Thrones	Michele Clapton	HBO
2011	Once Upon a Time	Eduardo Castro	ABC
2011	Pan Am	Ane Crabtree	ABC
2012	Downton Abbey	Caroline McCall	PBS
2012	Boardwalk Empire	John Dunn and Lisa Padovani	HBO
2012	Game of Thrones	Michele Clapton	HBO
2013	Downton Abbey	Caroline McCall	PBS
2013	Boardwalk Empire	John Dunn and Lisa Padovani	HBO
2013	The Borgias	Gabriella Pescucci	Showtime
2013	Game of Thrones	Michele Clapton	HBO
2013	Mad Men	Janie Bryant	AMC
2014	Game of Thrones	Michele Clapton	HBO
2014	Boardwalk Empire	John Dunn	HBO
2014	The Knick	Ellen Mirojnick	Cinemax
2014	Mad Men	Janie Bryant	AMC
2014	Masters of Sex	Ane Crabtree	Showtime

== Designers with multiple wins ==
2 wins

- Janie Bryant
- John Dunn
- April Ferry
- Caroline McCall
- Lisa Padovani

== Programs with multiple wins ==
2 wins

- Boardwalk Empire
- Downton Abbey
- Mad Men
- Rome

== Designers with multiple nominations ==
This total includes nominations for Excellence in Television

8 nominations

- Janie Bryant

5 nominations

- John Dunn

4 nominations

- Joan Bergin
- Michele Clapton
- Lisa Padovani
- Melina Root

3 nominations

- April Ferry
- Hope Hanafin
- Patia Prouty

2 nominations

- Robert Blackman
- Van Broughton Ramsey
- Eduardo Castro
- Ane Crabtree
- Chrisi Karvonides-Dushenko
- Caroline McCall
- Dan Moore
- Gabriella Pescucci
- Maria Schicker

== Programs with multiple nominations ==
5 nominations

- Boardwalk Empire
- Mad Men

4 nominations

- Game of Thrones
- That '70s Show
- The Tudors

3 nominations

- Cold Case
- Deadwood
- Rome

2 nominations

- The Borgias
- Carnivàle
- Downton Abbey
- Pushing Daisies
