= 10th Costume Designers Guild Awards =

Award ceremony for film and television costuming in 2007

- Date: February 19, 2008
- Location: Beverly Wilshire Hotel, Beverly Hills, California
- Country: United States
- Presented by: Costume Designers Guild
- Hosted by: Anjelica Huston

Highlights
- Excellence in Contemporary Film: Blades of Glory – Julie Weiss
- Excellence in Fantasy Film: The Golden Compass – Ruth Myers
- Excellence in Period Film: Sweeney Todd: The Demon Barber of Fleet Street – Colleen Atwood

The 10th Costume Designers Guild Awards, honoring the best costume designs in film and television for 2007, were given in 2008. The nominees were announced on January 16, 2008.

== Winners and nominees ==
The winners are in bold.

=== Film ===
Excellence in Contemporary Film	Excellence in Period Film
**Blades of Glory – Julie Weiss**; The Diving Bell and the Butterfly – Olivier Bériot; Into the Wild – Mary Claire Hannan; Juno – Monique Prudhomme; Ocean's Thirteen – Louise Frogley	**Sweeney Todd: The Demon Barber of Fleet Street – Colleen Atwood**; 3:10 to Yuma – Arianne Phillips; Atonement – Jacqueline Durran; Elizabeth: The Golden Age – Alexandra Byrne; La Vie en Rose – Marit Allen (posthumous)
Excellence in Fantasy Film
**The Golden Compass – Ruth Myers**; 300 – Michael Wilkinson; Enchanted – Mona May; Harry Potter and the Order of the Phoenix – Jany Temime; Pirates of the Caribbean: At World's End – Penny Rose

=== Television ===
Outstanding Contemporary Television	Outstanding Period/Fantasy Television
**Ugly Betty – Eduardo Castro**; Big Love – Chrisi Karvonides-Dushenko; Dancing with the Stars – Randall Christensen; Entourage – Amy Westcott; The Sopranos – Juliet Polcsa	**Pushing Daisies – Robert Blackman**; Rome – April Ferry; The Tudors – Joan Bergin
Outstanding Made for Television Movie or Miniseries
**Bury My Heart at Wounded Knee – Mario Davignon**; Jane Eyre – Andrea Galer; The Starter Wife – Marion Boyce and Debra McGuire

=== Commercial ===
Excellence in Commercial Design
- **Capital One, "Princess Kiss" – Deborah Ferguson**
  - American Express "Member’s Project" – Beth Pasternak
  - Burger King, "The Nutcracker" – Melissa Bruning

=== Special awards ===
==== Career Achievement Award ====
- Ruth Myers (film)
- Ray Aghayan (television)

==== Swarovski President’s Award ====
- Paula Wagner

==== Distinguished Director Award ====
- James Mangold

==== Distinguished Producer Award ====
- Cathy Konrad

==== Hall of Fame ====
- Marit Allen
