= 7th Costume Designers Guild Awards =

Award ceremony for film and television costuming in 2004

- Date: February 19, 2005
- Location: The Beverly Hilton, Beverly Hills, California
- Country: United States
- Presented by: Costume Designers Guild
- Hosted by: Ted Danson; Mary Steenburgen

Highlights
- Excellence in Contemporary Film: The Life Aquatic with Steve Zissou – Milena Canonero
- Excellence in Period/Fantasy Film: Lemony Snicket's A Series of Unfortunate Events – Colleen Atwood

The 7th Costume Designers Guild Awards, given on February 19, 2005, honored the best costume designs in film and television for 2004. The nominees were announced on January 4, 2005.

== Winners and nominees ==
The winners are in bold.

=== Film ===
Excellence in Contemporary Film	Excellence in Period/Fantasy Film
**The Life Aquatic with Steve Zissou – Milena Canonero**; Alfie – Beatrix Aruna Pasztor; Eternal Sunshine of the Spotless Mind – Melissa Toth; Kill Bill: Volume 2 – Catherine Marie Thomas; Ocean's Twelve – Milena Canonero	**Lemony Snicket's A Series of Unfortunate Events – Colleen Atwood**; The Aviator – Sandy Powell; De-Lovely – Janty Yates; The Phantom of the Opera – Alexandra Byrne; Ray – Sharen Davis

=== Television ===
Excellence in Contemporary Television	Excellence in Period/Fantasy Television
**Sex and the City – Patricia Field**; Desperate Housewives – Catherine Adair; Nip/Tuck – Lou Eyrich; Six Feet Under – Jill M. Ohanneson; The Sopranos – Juliet Polcsa	**The Life and Death of Peter Sellers – Jill Taylor**; Cold Case – Patia Prouty; Deadwood – Katherine Jane Bryant; Iron Jawed Angels – Caroline Harris; The Lion in Winter – Consolata Boyle

=== Commercial ===
Excellence in Commercial Design
- **Apple Computer, iPod, "Dance" – Jennifer Rade**
  - Capital One, "Football Stadium..Visigoths" – Christopher Lawrence
  - Target, "Wake Up Call" – Deborah Ferguson

=== Special awards ===
==== Career Achievement Award ====
- Anthea Sylbert (film)
- Robert Fletcher (television)

==== Swarovski President’s Award ====
- Debbie Reynolds

==== Distinguished Director Award ====
- James Ivory

==== Distinguished Director Award ====
- Ismail Merchant

==== Hall of Fame ====
- René Hubert
- Irene
- Ruth Morley
- Vera West
