= 12th Costume Designers Guild Awards =

Award ceremony for film and television costuming in 2009

- Date: February 25, 2010
- Location: The Beverly Hilton, Beverly Hills, California
- Country: United States
- Presented by: Costume Designers Guild
- Hosted by: Parker Posey

Highlights
- Excellence in Contemporary Film: Crazy Heart – Doug Hall
- Excellence in Fantasy Film: The Imaginarium of Doctor Parnassus – Monique Prudhomme
- Excellence in Period Film: The Young Victoria – Sandy Powell

The 12th Costume Designers Guild Awards, honoring the best costume designs in film and television for 2009, were given on February 25, 2010. The nominees were announced on January 26, 2010.

== Winners and nominees ==
The winners are in bold.

=== Film ===
Excellence in Contemporary Film	Excellence in Period Film
**Crazy Heart – Doug Hall**; (500) Days of Summer – Hope Hanafin; Brüno – Jason Alper; Precious: Based on the Novel "Push" by Sapphire – Marina Draghici; Up in the Air – Danny Glicker	**The Young Victoria – Sandy Powell**; Coco Before Chanel – Catherine Leterrier; Julie & Julia – Ann Roth; Nine – Colleen Atwood; Sherlock Holmes – Jenny Beavan
Excellence in Fantasy Film
**The Imaginarium of Doctor Parnassus – Monique Prudhomme**; Avatar – Mayes C. Rubeo and Deborah Lynn Scott; Star Trek – Michael Kaplan

=== Television ===
Outstanding Contemporary Television	Outstanding Period/Fantasy Television
**Glee – Lou Eyrich**; Big Love – Chrisi Karvonides-Dushenko; Dancing with the Stars – Randall Christensen; The No. 1 Ladies' Detective Agency – Jo Katsaras; Ugly Betty – Patricia Field	**Mad Men – Janie Bryant**; True Blood – Audrey Fisher; The Tudors – Joan Bergin
Outstanding Made for Television Movie or Miniseries
**Grey Gardens – Catherine Marie Thomas**; Georgia O'Keeffe – Michael Dennison; Little Dorrit – Barbara Kidd

=== Commercial ===
Excellence in Commercial Design
- **Milk, "Milkquarious" – Casey Storm**

=== Special awards ===
==== Career Achievement Award ====
- Sandy Powell (film)
- Michael Travis (television)

==== Swarovski Award ====
- Emily Blunt

==== Distinguished Collaborator Award ====
- Rob Marshall

==== Hall of Fame ====
- Robert Turturice
