= Costume Designers Guild Award for Excellence in Contemporary Television =

Annual CDG TV award

The Costume Designers Guild Award for Excellence in Contemporary Television is one of the annual awards given by the Costume Designers Guild.

In 1998, the Guild introduced a single award category titled Excellence in Television, in which all television programs competed regardless of genre or format. Among the inaugural nominees, four were period dramas. The winner that year was The Tempest, a fantasy television film. Furthermore, all nominated shows were either limited series or television films, which makes it the only time with no regularly continued series recognized. Beginning with the 1999 ceremony, the Guild divided the award into two categories: Excellence in Contemporary Television and Excellence in Period/Fantasy Television.

== Winners and nominees ==
=== 1990s ===
Year	Series	Costume Designer(s)	Network
1999	Sex and the City	Patricia Field	HBO
1999	3rd Rock from the Sun	Melina Root	NBC
1999	Ally McBeal	Rachael Stanley	Fox
1999	Tracey Takes On...	Jane Ruhm	HBO

=== 2000s ===
Year	Series	Costume Designer(s)	Network
2000	Sex and the City	Patricia Field	HBO
2000	Ally McBeal	Kathleen Detoro and Yana Syrkin	Fox
2000	The West Wing	Lyn Paolo	NBC
2000	Will & Grace	Lori Eskowitz-Carter	NBC
2001	The Sopranos	Juliette Polsca	HBO
2001	Sex and the City	Patricia Field	HBO
2001	Six Feet Under	Mark Bridges ("Pilot"); Gail McMullen (Series)	HBO
2001	Will & Grace	Lori Eskowitz-Carter	NBC
2002	Alias	Laura Goldsmith	ABC
2002	Sex and the City	Patricia Field	HBO
2002	Six Feet Under	Gail McMullen	HBO
2002	The Sopranos	Juliette Polsca	HBO
2003	Sex and the City	Patricia Field	HBO
2003	Alias	Laura Goldsmith	ABC
2003	Six Feet Under	Jill M. Ohanneson	HBO
2003	The Sopranos	Juliette Polsca	HBO
2003	Will & Grace	Lori Eskowitz-Carter	NBC
2004	Sex and the City	Patricia Field	HBO
2004	Desperate Housewives	Catherine Adair	ABC
2004	Nip/Tuck	Lou Eyrich	FX
2004	Six Feet Under	Jill M. Ohanneson	HBO
2004	The Sopranos	Juliette Polsca	HBO
2005	Six Feet Under	Jill M. Ohanneson	HBO
2005	Alias	Laura Goldsmith	ABC
2005	Arrested Development	Katie Sparks	Fox
2005	Desperate Housewives	Catherine Adair	ABC
2005	Nip/Tuck	Lou Eyrich	FX
2006	Ugly Betty	Eduardo Castro	ABC
2006	Big Love	Chrisi Karvonides-Dushenko	HBO
2006	Desperate Housewives	Catherine Adair	ABC
2006	Entourage	Amy Westcott	HBO
2006	The Sopranos	Juliette Polsca	HBO
2007	Ugly Betty	Eduardo Castro	ABC
2007	Big Love	Chrisi Karvonides-Dushenko	HBO
2007	Dancing with the Stars	Randall Christensen	ABC
2007	Entourage	Amy Westcott	HBO
2007	The Sopranos	Juliette Polsca	HBO
2008	Ugly Betty	Eduardo Castro and Patricia Field	ABC
2008	30 Rock	Tom Broecker	NBC
2008	Dancing with the Stars	Randall Christensen	ABC
2008	Entourage	Amy Westcott	HBO
2008	Gossip Girl	Eric Daman	The CW
2009	Glee	Lou Eyrich	Fox
2009	Big Love	Chrisi Karvonides-Dushenko	HBO
2009	Dancing with the Stars	Randall Christensen	ABC
2009	The No. 1 Ladies' Detective Agency	Jo Katsaras	HBO
2009	Ugly Betty	Patricia Field	ABC

=== 2010s ===
Year	Series	Costume Designer(s)	Network
2010	Glee	Lou Eyrich	Fox
2010	Big Love	Chrisi Karvonides-Dushenko	HBO
2010	Dancing with the Stars	Randall Christensen, Daniella Gschwendtner and Steven Norman Lee	ABC
2010	Modern Family	Alix Friedberg	ABC
2010	Treme	Alonzo Wilson	HBO
2011	Glee	Jennifer Eve and Lou Eyrich	Fox
2011	Modern Family	Alix Friedberg	ABC
2011	Revenge	Jill M. Ohanneson	ABC
2011	Saturday Night Live	Tom Broecker and Eric Justian	NBC
2011	Sons of Anarchy	Kelli Jones	FX
2012	Smash	Molly Maginnis	NBC
2012	Girls	Jennifer Rogien	HBO
2012	Nashville	Susie DeSanto	ABC
2012	Revenge	Jill M. Ohanneson	ABC
2012	Treme	Alonzo Wilson and Ann Walters	HBO
2013	House of Cards	Tom Broecker	Netflix
2013	Breaking Bad	Jennifer L. Bryan	AMC
2013	Nashville	Susie DeSanto	ABC
2013	Saturday Night Live	Tom Broecker and Eric Justian	NBC
2013	Scandal	Lyn Paolo	ABC
2014	True Detective	Jenny Eagan	HBO
2014	House of Cards	Johanna Argan	Netflix
2014	Ray Donovan	Christopher Lawrence	Showtime
2014	Saturday Night Live	Tom Broecker and Eric Justian	NBC
2014	Scandal	Lyn Paolo	ABC
2015	American Horror Story: Hotel	Lou Eyrich	FX
2015	Empire (Season 1)	Rita McGhee	Fox
2015	House of Cards	Johanna Argan and Kemal Harris	Netflix
2015	Ray Donovan	Christopher Lawrence	Showtime
2015	Transparent	Marie Schley	Amazon
2016	American Horror Story: Roanoke	Lou Eyrich and Helen Huang	FX
2016	Empire	Paolo Nieddu	Fox
2016	Grace and Frankie	Allyson B. Fanger	Netflix
2016	House of Cards	Johanna Argan and Kemal Harris	Netflix
2016	Transparent	Marie Schley	Amazon
2017	The Handmaid's Tale	Ane Crabtree	Hulu
2017	American Horror Story: Cult	Sarah Evelyn Bram	FX
2017	Big Little Lies	Alix Friedberg	HBO
2017	Grace and Frankie	Allyson B. Fanger	Netflix
2017	The Young Pope	Luca Canfora and Carlo Poggioli	HBO
2018	The Assassination of Gianni Versace: American Crime Story	Lou Eyrich and Allison Leach	FX
2018	Grace and Frankie	Allyson B. Fanger	Netflix
2018	The Romanoffs	Janie Bryant and Wendy Chuck	Amazon
2018	Sharp Objects	Alix Friedberg	HBO
2018	This Is Us	Hala Bahmet	NBC

Year	Series	Episode(s)	Costume Designer(s)	Network
2019	Schitt's Creek	"The Dress"	Debra Hanson	Pop
2019	Big Little Lies	"She Knows"	Alix Friedberg	HBO
2019	Fleabag	Episode 1"	Ray Holman	Amazon
2019	Killing Eve	"Desperate Times"	Charlotte Mitchell	BBC America
2019	Russian Doll	"Superiority Complex"	Jennifer Rogien	Netflix

=== 2020s ===
Year	Series	Episode(s)	Costume Designer(s)	Network
2020	Schitt's Creek	"Happy Ending"	Debra Hanson	Pop
2020	Emily in Paris	"Faux Amis"	Patricia Field and Marylin Fitoussi	Netflix
2020	Euphoria	"Trouble Don't Last Always"	Heidi Bivens	HBO
2020	I May Destroy You	"Social Media is a Great Way to Connect"	Lynsey Moore	HBO
2020	Unorthodox	"Part 2"	Justine Seymour	Netflix
2021	Emily in Paris	"French Revolution"	Patricia Field and Marylin Fitoussi	Netflix
2021	Euphoria	"Fuck Anyone Who's Not a Sea Blob"	Heidi Bivens	HBO
2021	Hacks	"Pilot"	Kathleen Felix-Hager	HBO Max
2021	Mare of Easttown	"Miss Lady Hawk Herself"	Meghan Kasperlik	HBO
2021	Squid Game	"VIPS"	Cho Sang-kyung	Netflix
2022	Wednesday	"Wednesday's Child is Full of Woe"	Colleen Atwood and Mark Sutherland	Netflix
2022	Emily in Paris	"What's it All About..."	Marylin Fitoussi	Netflix
2022	Euphoria	"Trying to Get to Heaven Before They Close the Door"	Heidi Bivens	HBO
2022	Hacks	"The Captain's Wife"	Kathleen Felix-Hager	HBO Max
2022	The White Lotus	"In the Sandbox"	Alex Bovaird	HBO
2023	Beef	"The Birds Don't Sing, They Screech in Pain"	Helen Huang	Netflix
2023	The Bear	"Fishes"	Courtney Wheeler	FX on Hulu
2023	The Last of Us	"Endure and Survive"	Cynthia Ann Summers	HBO
2023	The Morning Show	"The Kármán Line"	Sophie de Rakoff and Debra McGuire	Apple TV+
2023	Poker Face	"The Orpheus Syndrome"	Trayce Gigi Field	Peacock
2024	Hacks	"Just for Laughs"	Kathleen Felix-Hager	Max
2024	Agatha All Along	"Seekest Thou the Road"	Daniel Selon	Disney+
2024	Baby Reindeer	"Episode 4"	Mekel Bailey	Netflix
2024	Emily in Paris	"The Grey Area"	Marylin Fitoussi	Netflix
2024	The Gentlemen	"Refined Aggression"	Loulou Bontemps	Netflix
2025	The Studio	"CinemaCon"	Kameron Lennox	Apple TV+
2025	Emily in Paris	"Veni, Vidi, Venezia"	Marylin Fitoussi	Netflix
2025	Hacks	"Heaven"	Kathleen Felix-Hager	HBO Max
2025	The Righteous Gemstones	"You Hurled Me Into the Very Heart of the Seas"	Christina Flannery	HBO
2025	Wednesday	"Woe Me the Money"	Colleen Atwood and Mark Sutherland	Netflix

== Designers with multiple wins ==
6 wins

- Lou Eyrich
- Patricia Field

3 wins

- Eduardo Castro

2 wins

- Debra Hanson
- Helen Huang

== Programs with multiple wins ==
4 wins

- Sex and the City

3 wins

- Glee
- Ugly Betty

2 wins

- American Horror Story
- Schitt's Creek

== Designers with multiple nominations ==
10 nominations

- Patricia Field

8 nominations

- Lou Eyrich

6 nominations

- Juliette Polsca

5 nominations

- Tom Broecker
- Marylin Fitoussi
- Alix Friedberg
- Jill M. Ohanneson

4 nominations

- Randall Christensen
- Kathleen Felix-Hager
- Chrisi Karvonides-Dushenko

3 nominations

- Catherine Adair
- Johanna Argan
- Heidi Bivens
- Eduardo Castro
- Lori Eskowitz-Carter
- Allyson B. Fanger
- Laura Goldsmith
- Eric Justian
- Lyn Paolo
- Amy Westcott

2 nominations

- Colleen Atwood
- Susie DeSanto
- Debra Hanson
- Kemal Harris
- Helen Huang
- Christopher Lawrence
- Gail McMullen
- Jennifer Rogien
- Marie Schley
- Mark Sutherland
- Alonzo Wilson

== Programs with multiple nominations ==
6 nominations

- Sex and the City
- The Sopranos

5 nominations

- Emily in Paris
- Six Feet Under

4 nominations

- Big Love
- Dancing with the Stars
- Hacks
- House of Cards
- Ugly Betty

3 nominations

- Alias
- American Horror Story
- Desperate Housewives
- Entourage
- Euphoria
- Glee
- Grace and Frankie
- Saturday Night Live
- Will & Grace

2 nominations

- Ally McBeal
- Big Little Lies
- Empire
- Modern Family
- Nashville
- Nip/Tuck
- Ray Donovan
- Revenge
- Scandal
- Schitt's Creek
- Transparent
- Treme
- Wednesday
