= List of awards and nominations received by Big Love =

This is the list of awards and nominations received by the television series Big Love (2006–2011).

== By award ==
=== Casting Society of America ===
- 2006: Best Casting for TV - Episodic Drama (Junie Lowry-Johnson, nominated)
- 2009: Best Casting for TV - Episodic Drama (Junie Lowry-Johnson, nominated)

=== Costume Designers Guild ===
- 2006: Outstanding Costume Design for TV Series - Contemporary (Chrisi Karvonides-Dushenko, nominated)
- 2007: Outstanding Costume Design for TV Series - Contemporary (Karvonides-Dushenko, nominated)

=== Emmy Awards ===
Year	Category	Recipients and nominees	Role/Episode	Result
2006	Outstanding Casting – Drama Series	Libby Goldstein and Junie Lowry-Johnson		Nominated
2006	Outstanding Directing – Drama Series	Rodrigo García	"Pilot"	Nominated
2006	Outstanding Main Title Design			Nominated
2008	Outstanding Guest Actress – Drama Series	Ellen Burstyn	Nancy Dutton	Nominated
2009	Outstanding Series – Drama			Nominated
2010	Outstanding Casting – Drama Series	Libby Goldstein, Junie Lowry-Johnson and Lisa Soltau		Nominated
2010	Outstanding Guest Actress – Drama Series	Mary Kay Place	Adaleen Grant	Nominated
2010	Outstanding Guest Actress – Drama Series	Sissy Spacek	Marilyn Densham	Nominated
2011	Outstanding Guest Actor - Drama Series	Bruce Dern	Frank Harlow	Nominated

=== Golden Globe Awards ===
Year	Category	Recipients and nominees	Role/Episode	Result
2007	Best Actor – Drama Series	Bill Paxton	Bill Henrickson	Nominated
2007	Best Series – Drama			Nominated
2008	Best Actor – Drama Series	Bill Paxton		Nominated
2008	Best Series – Drama			Nominated
2010	Best Actor – Drama Series	Bill Paxton		Nominated
2010	Best Series – Drama			Nominated
2010	Best Supporting Actress – Series, Miniseries or Television Film	Chloë Sevigny	Nicolette Grant	Won

=== Satellite Awards ===
Year	Category	Recipients and nominees	Role/Episode	Result
2006	Best Actor – Drama Series	Bill Paxton	Bill Henrickson	Nominated
2006	Best Actress – Drama Series	Jeanne Tripplehorn	Barb Henrickson	Nominated
2007	Best Actor – Drama Series	Bill Paxton		Nominated
2007	Best Actress – Drama Series	Jeanne Tripplehorn		Nominated
2007	Best Supporting Actor – Series, Miniseries or Television Film	Harry Dean Stanton	Roman Grant	Nominated
2009	Best Actor – Drama Series	Bill Paxton		Nominated
2009	Best Series – Drama			Nominated
2009	Best Supporting Actor – Series, Miniseries or Television Film	Harry Dean Stanton		Nominated
2009	Best Supporting Actress – Series, Miniseries or Television Film	Chloë Sevigny	Nicolette Grant	Nominated

=== Writers Guild of America Awards ===
Year	Category	Recipients and nominees	Work	Result
2009	Episodic drama	Melanie Marnich	"Come, Ye Saints"	Nominated
