= 13th Costume Designers Guild Awards =

Award ceremony for film and television costuming in 2010

- Date: February 22, 2011
- Location: The Beverly Hilton, Beverly Hills, California
- Country: United States
- Presented by: Costume Designers Guild
- Hosted by: Kristin Davis

Highlights
- Excellence in Contemporary Film: Black Swan – Amy Westcott
- Excellence in Fantasy Film: Alice in Wonderland – Colleen Atwood
- Excellence in Period Film: The King's Speech – Jenny Beavan

The 13th Costume Designers Guild Awards, honoring the best costume designs in film and television for 2010, were given on February 22, 2011 at the Beverly Hilton Hotel in Beverly Hills. The nominees were announced on January 20, 2011.

== Winners and nominees ==
The winners are in bold.

=== Film ===
Excellence in Contemporary Film	Excellence in Period Film
**Black Swan – Amy Westcott**; Burlesque – Michael Kaplan; Inception – Jeffrey Kurland; The Social Network – Jacqueline West; Wall Street: Money Never Sleeps – Ellen Mirojnick	**The King's Speech – Jenny Beavan**; The Fighter – Mark Bridges; True Grit – Mary Zophres
Excellence in Fantasy Film
**Alice in Wonderland – Colleen Atwood**; The Tempest – Sandy Powell; Tron: Legacy – Michael Wilkinson and Christine Bieselin Clark

=== Television ===
Outstanding Contemporary Television	Outstanding Period/Fantasy Television
**Glee – Lou Eyrich**; Big Love – Chrisi Karvonides-Dushenko; Dancing with the Stars – Randall Christensen, Daniella Gschwendtner and Steven Norman Lee; Modern Family – Alix Friedberg; Treme – Alonzo Wilson	**Boardwalk Empire – John Dunn and Lisa Padovani**; Mad Men – Janie Bryant; The Tudors – Joan Bergin
Outstanding Made for Television Movie or Miniseries
**Temple Grandin – Cindy Evans**; The Pacific – Penny Rose; You Don't Know Jack – Rita Ryack

=== Commercial ===
Excellence in Commercial Design
- **Chanel, "Bleu de Chanel" – Aude Bronson-Howard**
  - Dos Equis, "The Most Interesting Man in the World" – Julie Vogel
  - Netflix, "Western" – Lydia Paddon
  - Target, "Preparing for Race/Black Friday" – Michelle Martini

=== Special awards ===
==== Career Achievement Award ====
- Julie Weiss (film & television)

==== LACOSTE Spotlight Award ====
- Halle Berry

==== Distinguished Collaborator Award ====
- Joel Schumacher

==== Hall of Fame ====
- Michael Dennison
