= 19th Costume Designers Guild Awards =

Award ceremony for film and television costuming in 2016

- Date: February 21, 2017
- Location: The Beverly Hilton, Beverly Hills, California
- Country: United States
- Presented by: Costume Designers Guild
- Hosted by: Mandy Moore

Highlights
- Excellence in Contemporary Film: La La Land – Mary Zophres
- Excellence in Fantasy Film: Doctor Strange – Alexandra Byrne
- Excellence in Period Film: Hidden Figures – Renee Ehrlich Kalfus

The 19th Costume Designers Guild Awards, honoring the best costume designs in film and television for 2016, took place on February 21, 2017. The nominees were announced on January 12, 2017.

== Winners and nominees ==
The winners are in bold.

=== Film ===
Excellence in Contemporary Film	Excellence in Period Film
**La La Land – Mary Zophres**; Absolutely Fabulous: The Movie – Rebecca Hale; Captain Fantastic – Courtney Hoffman; Lion – Cappi Ireland; Nocturnal Animals – Arianne Phillips	**Hidden Figures – Renee Ehrlich Kalfus**; The Dressmaker – Marion Boyce and Margot Wilson; Florence Foster Jenkins – Consolata Boyle; Hail, Caesar! – Mary Zophres; Jackie – Madeline Fontaine
Excellence in Fantasy Film
**Doctor Strange – Alexandra Byrne**; Fantastic Beasts and Where to Find Them – Colleen Atwood; Kubo and the Two Strings – Deborah Cook; Miss Peregrine's Home for Peculiar Children – Colleen Atwood; Rogue One: A Star Wars Story – Dave Crossman and Glyn Dillon

=== Television ===
Outstanding Contemporary Television	Outstanding Period Television
**American Horror Story: Roanoke – Lou Eyrich and Helen Huang**; Empire – Paolo Nieddu; Grace and Frankie – Allyson B. Fanger; House of Cards – Johanna Argan and Kemal Harris; Transparent – Marie Schley	**The Crown – Michele Clapton**; Penny Dreadful – Gabriella Pescucci; Stranger Things – Kimberly Adams and Malgosia Turzanska; Westworld, "Pilot" – Trish Summerville; Westworld, Series – Ane Crabtree
Outstanding Fantasy Television
**Game of Thrones – Michele Clapton and April Ferry**; The Man in the High Castle – J.R. Hawbaker; Once Upon a Time – Eduardo Castro; Sleepy Hollow – Mairi Chisholm; The Walking Dead – Eulyn C. Womble

=== Short Form ===
Excellence in Short Form Design
- **Pepsi: "Momotarō" feat. Jude Law – Ami Goodheart**
  - Beyoncé: "Hold Up" – B. Åkerlund
  - Dos Equis: "The Most Interesting Man in the World – Mission to Mars" – Julie Vogel
  - Dos Equis: "The New Most Interesting Man in the World Traverses the Sand and the Serengeti" – Liz Botes
  - H&M: "Come Together" feat. Adrien Brody, directed by Wes Anderson – Milena Canonero

=== Special awards ===
==== Career Achievement Award ====
- Jeffrey Kurland

==== LACOSTE Spotlight Award ====
- Lily Collins

==== Distinguished Collaborator Award ====
- Meryl Streep

==== Distinguished Service Award ====
- Lois DeArmond

==== Hall of Fame ====
- Ret Turner
