= Rita McGhee =

American costume designer for film and television

- Born: August 22, 1964 (age 62); San Francisco, California, U.S.
- Education: Howard University
- Occupation: Costume designer
- Years active: 1990-present
- Website: ritamcghee.net

Rita McGhee (born August 22, 1964) is an American costume designer for film and television. Her career has included projects spanning various fashion eras. She is known for her work on season 1 of FOX's musical drama series Empire. In July 2015, McGhee's costume design on episode 8, "The Lyon's Roar", was nominated for the Emmy Award for Outstanding Costumes for a Contemporary Series, Limited Series, or Movie. The following year, in January 2016, her costume design for the season was nominated for the Costume Designers Guild Award for Outstanding Contemporary Costumes for a Television Series.

In addition, McGhee has led and/or contributed costume design for projects such as Spike Lee's musical drama film Chi-Raq (2015), BET's miniseries The New Edition Story (2017), Disney's musical film Zombies (2018), and BET's miniseries American Soul (2019).

== Early life and education ==
McGhee was born in San Francisco, California to Troy and Claudette McGhee. In 1968, her family relocated to Santa Rita, Guam when her father accepted a civil service position on the island. She has four siblings.

McGhee graduated from George Washington High School in Mangilao, Guam in 1982 and attended Howard University, studying fashion merchandising and business administration. She also took classes in costume design while working in the school theater, and graduated in 1989 with a Bachelor of Science.

== Career ==
After McGhee heard Spike Lee lecture at her college, she sent her resume to costume designer, Ruth E. Carter who was working with Lee's production company, and was hired by Carter as an intern and wardrobe production assistant. She then moved to Los Angeles, California and worked on Mo' Better Blues (1990), Jungle Fever (1991), The Five Heartbeats (1991), and What's Love Got to Do With It (1993) among others. McGhee also worked in the costume and wardrobe departments for In Living Color (1991-1992), Moesha (1996), and Baby Boy (2001).

After becoming a costume designer, McGhee worked on Reggie Rock Bythewood's Biker Boyz (2003), Jeffrey W. Byrd's King's Ransom (2005), and Benny Boom's Next Day Air (2009). She then took a break from Hollywood and relocated to Friendswood, Texas.

McGhee later interviewed for the costume designer position for Lee Daniels and Danny Strong's television series Empire. She accepted the job offer and relocated to Chicago, Illinois for filming. In March 2015, her costume design for Empire was referred to as the "hip-hop royalty look" by the Los Angeles Times. In July 2015, her work on the season 1 episode, "The Lyon's Roar", was nominated for an Emmy. The episode featured a "White Party" scene where the cast dressed in all white clothing. McGhee and her team launched Cookie's Closet, a website page featuring styles worn by Empire actress, Taraji P. Henson. In September 2015, Saks Fifth Avenue launched a curated fashion collection inspired by the show.

McGhee did not return for season 2 of Empire. She worked on the film Chi-Raq with Ruth E. Carter as lead costume designer. McGhee later provided costume design for The New Edition Story with clothing choices described as a "virtuosic symphony" by The New York Times. She continued to work on projects including Lifetime's Michael Jackson: Searching for Neverland (2017) and ABC's The Mayor (2017).

McGhee is a member of the Black Design Collective, a non-profit organization for African-American fashion designers and costume designers. She is also a member of the Costume Designers Guild.

== Filmography ==
Year	Title	Role	Refs
1990	Mo' Better Blues	Production assistant	
1991	Jungle Fever	Wardrobe assistant	
1991	The Five Heartbeats	Assistant costumer	
1993	What's Love Got to Do With It	On set costumer	
1993	Fear of a Black Hat	Costume design	
2001	Baby Boy	Wardrobe supervisor	
2002	Book of Love: The Definitive Reason Why Men Are Dogs	Costume designer	
2003	Biker Boyz	Costume designer	
2004	Woman Thou Art Loosed	Costumes	
2005	King's Ransom	Costume designer	
2007	All About Us	Costume designer	Press
2009	Next Day Air	Costume designer	
2009	My Brother's Keeper	Costume designer	Press
2015	Chi-Raq	Assistant costume designer	
2017	Michael Jackson: Searching for Neverland	Costume designer	
2018	Zombies	Costume designer	
2018	Life-Size 2	Costumes	Press

== Television ==
Year	Title	Crew role	Refs
1991-1992	In Living Color	Costume assistant	
1993-1994	Martin	Costume supervisor	Press
1996	Moesha	Costumes	
1997	Between Brothers	Costumes	
1997	Claude's Crib	Costumes	Press
1999	Grown Ups	Costumes	Press
2000	The Lyricist Lounge Show	Costume designer	Press
2003	Eve	Costumes (pilot episode)	Press
2005-2006	Cuts	Costume designer	
2010	Fake It Til You Make It	Costume designer	
2010	Love That Girl!	Costume designer	Press
2011	Reed Between the Lines	Costume designer	
2012	Let's Stay Together	Costume designer	
2012	Sunday Best	Stylist	
2013	Second Generation Wayans	Costume designer	Press
2015	Empire	Costume designer (season 1)	
2016	Zoe Ever After	Costume designer	
2017	The New Edition Story	Costume designer	
2017	The Mayor	Costume designer	
2018	The Bobby Brown Story	Costume designer	
2019	American Soul	Costume designer	
2019	Loved to Death	Costumes	Press
