= Colleen Atwood =

American costume designer (born 1948)

- Born: September 25, 1948 (age 77); Ellensburg, Washington, U.S.
- Education: Cornish College of the Arts
- Occupation: Costume designer
- Years active: 1981–present
- Children: 2
- Awards: Disney Legend, 2024

Colleen Atwood (born September 25, 1948) is an American costume designer. She has received numerous accolades, including four Academy Awards, three BAFTA Awards, and two Emmy Awards. She was honored with the Costume Designers Guild Career Achievement Award in 2006 and named a Disney Legend in 2024.

Atwood frequently collaborated with directors Jonathan Demme, Tim Burton, and Rob Marshall. She has received 12 nominations for the Academy Award for Best Costume Design and has won four times for Chicago (2002), Memoirs of a Geisha (2005), Alice in Wonderland (2010), and Fantastic Beasts and Where to Find Them (2016).

== Early life and education ==
Born in Ellensburg, Washington, Atwood grew up in the small farming community of Quincy, Washington. At 17, she became pregnant and didn't graduate high school with her class. To support her baby and her husband, who was in college, she took a job at a French fry factory. Then, Atwood received a scholarship to attend Cornish College of the Arts in Seattle in the early 1970s, and later worked in retail at various places, including the Yves St. Laurent boutique at Frederick & Nelson department store in the city.

== Career ==
Atwood began her career as a fashion advisor in Washington in the early 1970s. She moved to New York in 1980, where she studied art at New York University. Her movie career started after a chance encounter with someone whose mother was designing the sets for the film Ragtime, and she got the job of a PA (production assistant) in the film. She worked as an assistant to a costume designer and eventually earned her first film credit for A Little Sex, directed by Bruce Paltrow.

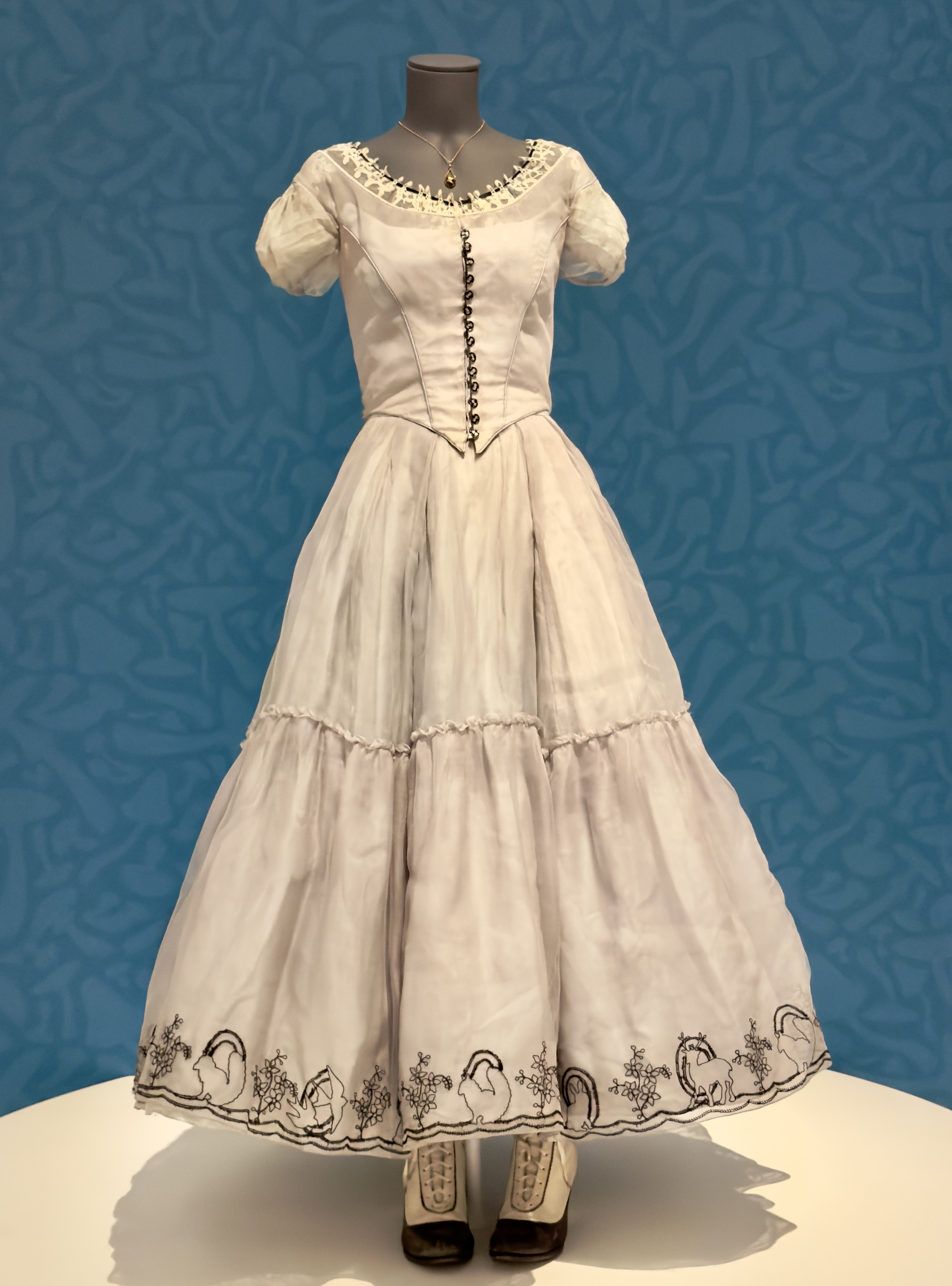
Costume worn by Mia Wasikowska as the title character in Alice in Wonderland, designed by Atwood.

Eventually Atwood ventured into the world of costume design for theater and film, initially coming to fame through her work on Sting's Bring On the Night World Tour, also made into a documentary by the same name. An important turning point in her career came when, through production designer Bo Welch with whom she had worked in Joe Versus the Volcano, she met director Tim Burton. Atwood and Burton worked together on over seven films in the next two decades, starting with Edward Scissorhands and including Sleepy Hollow, Ed Wood, Big Fish, Planet of the Apes, and Sweeney Todd. She moved to Los Angeles in 1990.

Atwood has been partially involved in developing or has been the lead designer for producing the costumes on over 50 films to date. She was the lead costume designer for all the new costumes created for Ringling Bros. and Barnum & Bailey Circus in 2005–2006. She also designed The Black Parade band uniforms for the band My Chemical Romance, as well as costumes for the following album, Danger Days: The True Lives of the Fabulous Killjoys. She also designs for television, including Arrow, The Flash, and Supergirl. Director Tim Burton brought on Atwood as the costume designer for the Netflix series Wednesday to design the looks for Gomez and Morticia Addams. The first thing she did was read the script. She started with Nevermore Academy and worked on the costumes for Wednesday Addams and Enid.

Atwood's favorite fashion designers include Azzedine Alaia, Yohji Yamamoto, and Alexander McQueen.

== Filmography ==
=== Film ===
Year	Title	Director	Notes	Ref.
1984	Firstborn	Michael Apted		
1985	Bring On the Night	Michael Apted		
1986	Manhunter	Michael Mann		
1987	Critical Condition	Michael Apted		
1987	The Pick-up Artist	James Toback		
1987	Someone to Watch Over Me	Ridley Scott		
1988	For Keeps	John G. Avildsen		
1988	Married to the Mob	Jonathan Demme		
1988	Fresh Horses	David Anspaugh		
1988	Torch Song Trilogy	Paul Bogart		
1989	Hider in the House	Matthew Patrick		
1990	The Handmaid's Tale	Volker Schlöndorff		
1990	Joe Versus the Volcano	John Patrick Shanley		
1990	Edward Scissorhands	Tim Burton		
1991	The Silence of the Lambs	Jonathan Demme		
1991	Rush	Lili Fini Zanuck		
1992	Lorenzo's Oil	George Miller		
1993	Born Yesterday	Luis Mandoki		
1993	Philadelphia	Jonathan Demme		
1994	Cabin Boy	Adam Resnick		
1994	Wyatt Earp	Lawrence Kasdan		
1994	Ed Wood	Tim Burton		
1994	Little Women	Gillian Armstrong		
1995	The Grotesque	John-Paul Davidson		
1996	The Juror	Brian Gibson		
1996	That Thing You Do!	Tom Hanks		
1996	Head Above Water	Jim Wilson		
1996	Mars Attacks!	Tim Burton		
1997	Buddy	Caroline Thompson		
1997	Gattaca	Andrew Niccol		
1998	Fallen	Gregory Hoblit		
1998	Beloved	Jonathan Demme		
1998	Mumford	Lawrence Kasdan		
1999	Sleepy Hollow	Tim Burton		
2001	Golden Dreams	Agnieszka Holland		
2001	The Mexican	Gore Verbinski		
2001	Planet of the Apes	Tim Burton		
2002	CinéMagique	Jerry Rees		
2002	Chicago	Rob Marshall		
2003	Big Fish	Tim Burton		
2004	Lemony Snicket's A Series of Unfortunate Events	Brad Silberling		
2005	Memoirs of a Geisha	Rob Marshall		
2006	Mission: Impossible III	J. J. Abrams		
2007	Sweeney Todd: The Demon Barber of Fleet Street	Tim Burton		
2009	Nine	Rob Marshall		
2009	Public Enemies	Michael Mann		
2010	Alice in Wonderland	Tim Burton		
2010	The Tourist	Florian Henckel von Donnersmarck		
2011	The Rum Diary	Bruce Robinson		
2011	In Time	Andrew Niccol		
2012	Dark Shadows	Tim Burton		
2012	Snow White and the Huntsman	Rupert Sanders		
2014	Big Eyes	Tim Burton		
2014	Into the Woods	Rob Marshall		
2015	Blackhat	Michael Mann		
2016	The Huntsman: Winter's War	Cedric Nicolas-Troyan		
2016	Alice Through the Looking Glass	James Bobin		
2016	Miss Peregrine's Home for Peculiar Children	Tim Burton		
2016	Fantastic Beasts and Where to Find Them	David Yates		
2018	Tomb Raider	Roar Uthaug	with Timothy A. Wonsik	
2018	Fantastic Beasts: The Crimes of Grindelwald	David Yates		
2019	Dumbo	Tim Burton		
2019	Lady and the Tramp	Charlie Bean	with Timothy A. Wonsik	
2019	Now Is Everything	Valentina De Amicis; Riccardo Spinotti		
2019	Bombshell	Jay Roach		
2020	Borat Subsequent Moviefilm	Jason Woliner	Visual consultant	
2022	Fantastic Beasts: The Secrets of Dumbledore	David Yates		
2022	Top Gun: Maverick	Joseph Kosinski	Visual consultant	
2023	The Little Mermaid	Rob Marshall		
2023	Pain Hustlers	David Yates		
2024	Beetlejuice Beetlejuice	Tim Burton		
2025	Kiss of the Spider Woman	Bill Condon	with Christine Cantella	
2025	One Battle After Another	Paul Thomas Anderson		
TBA	Rothko			

=== Television ===
Year	Title	Notes	Ref.
1985	Out of the Darkness	Television film	
2001	The Tick	Episode: "Pilot"	
2012	Arrow	Episode: "Pilot"	
2014–2018	The Flash	2 episodes	
2015	Supergirl	Episode: "Pilot"	
2016	The Tick	Episode: "Pilot"	
2020	High Fidelity	Episode: "Top Five Heartbreaks"	
2022–2025	Wednesday	15 episodes	
2024	Masters of the Air	9 episodes	

== Awards and nominations ==
Major associations

Academy Awards

Year	Category	Nominated work	Result	Ref.
1995	Best Costume Design	Little Women	Nominated	
1999	Best Costume Design	Beloved	Nominated	
2000	Best Costume Design	Sleepy Hollow	Nominated	
2003	Best Costume Design	Chicago	Won	
2005	Best Costume Design	Lemony Snicket's A Series of Unfortunate Events	Nominated	
2006	Best Costume Design	Memoirs of a Geisha	Won	
2008	Best Costume Design	Sweeney Todd: The Demon Barber of Fleet Street	Nominated	
2010	Best Costume Design	Nine	Nominated	
2011	Best Costume Design	Alice in Wonderland	Won	
2013	Best Costume Design	Snow White and the Huntsman	Nominated	
2015	Best Costume Design	Into the Woods	Nominated	
2017	Best Costume Design	Fantastic Beasts and Where to Find Them	Won	

BAFTA Awards

Year	Category	Nominated work	Result	Ref.
British Academy Film Awards
1992	Best Costume Design	Edward Scissorhands	Nominated	
1995	Best Costume Design	Little Women	Nominated	
2000	Best Costume Design	Sleepy Hollow	Won	
2002	Best Costume Design	Planet of the Apes	Nominated	
2003	Best Costume Design	Chicago	Nominated	
2006	Best Costume Design	Memoirs of a Geisha	Won	
2008	Best Costume Design	Sweeney Todd: The Demon Barber of Fleet Street	Nominated	
2011	Best Costume Design	Alice in Wonderland	Won	
2013	Best Costume Design	Snow White and the Huntsman	Nominated	
2015	Best Costume Design	Into the Woods	Nominated	
2017	Best Costume Design	Fantastic Beasts and Where to Find Them	Nominated	

Emmy Awards

Year	Category	Nominated work	Result	Ref.
Primetime Emmy Awards
2007	Outstanding Costumes for a Variety Program or Special	Tony Bennett: An American Classic	Won	
2023	Outstanding Contemporary Costumes	Wednesday (Episode: "Wednesday's Child Is Full of Woe")	Won	
2026	Outstanding Contemporary Costumes	Wednesday (Episode: "Woe Me the Money")	Nominated	

Miscellaneous awards

List of Colleen Atwood other awards and nominations
Award	Year (Note: Indicates the year of ceremony. Each year is linked to the article about the awards held that year, wherever possible.)	Category	Title	Result	Ref.
Astra Film and Creative Arts Awards	2024	Best Costume Design	Beetlejuice Beetlejuice	Nominated	
Astra Film and Creative Arts Awards	2024	Artisan Icon Award	—N/a	Honored	
Astra TV and Creative Arts Awards	2023	Best Fantasy or Science Fiction Costumes	Wednesday	Won	
Astra TV and Creative Arts Awards	2025	Best Costume Design	Wednesday	Won	
CFDA Fashion Awards	2013	Board of Director’s Tribute Award	—N/a	Honored	
Costume Designers Guild Awards	1999	Excellence in Film	Beloved	Nominated	
Costume Designers Guild Awards	2000	Excellence in Period/Fantasy Film	Sleepy Hollow	Won	
Costume Designers Guild Awards	2002	Excellence in Period/Fantasy Film	Planet of the Apes	Nominated	
Costume Designers Guild Awards	2003	Excellence in Period/Fantasy Film	Chicago	Won	
Costume Designers Guild Awards	2005	Excellence in Period/Fantasy Film	Lemony Snicket's A Series of Unfortunate Events	Won	
Costume Designers Guild Awards	2006	Excellence in Period Film	Memoirs of a Geisha	Won	
Costume Designers Guild Awards	2006	Career Achievement Award	—N/a	Honored	
Costume Designers Guild Awards	2008	Excellence in Period Film	Sweeney Todd: The Demon Barber of Fleet Street	Won	
Costume Designers Guild Awards	2010	Excellence in Period Film	Nine	Nominated	
Costume Designers Guild Awards	2011	Excellence in Fantasy Film	Alice in Wonderland	Won	
Costume Designers Guild Awards	2013	Excellence in Fantasy Film	Snow White and the Huntsman	Nominated	
Costume Designers Guild Awards	2015	Excellence in Fantasy Film	Into the Woods	Won	
Costume Designers Guild Awards	2017	Excellence in Fantasy Film	Fantastic Beasts and Where to Find Them	Nominated	
Costume Designers Guild Awards	2017	Excellence in Fantasy Film	Miss Peregrine's Home for Peculiar Children	Nominated	
Costume Designers Guild Awards	2023	Excellence in Contemporary Television	Wednesday (Episode: "Wednesday's Child Is Full of Woe")	Won	
Costume Designers Guild Awards	2024	Excellence in Sci-Fi/Fantasy Film	The Little Mermaid	Nominated	
Costume Designers Guild Awards	2025	Excellence in Sci-Fi/Fantasy Film	Beetlejuice Beetlejuice	Nominated	
Costume Designers Guild Awards	2026	Excellence in Contemporary Film	One Battle After Another	Won	
Costume Designers Guild Awards	2026	Excellence in Contemporary Television	Wednesday (Episode: "Woe Me the Money")	Nominated	
Costume Designers Guild Awards	2026	Excellence in Short Form Design	Lady Gaga: "The Dead Dance"	Nominated	
Critics' Choice Awards	2010	Best Costume Design	Nine	Nominated	
Critics' Choice Awards	2011	Best Costume Design	Alice in Wonderland	Won	
Critics' Choice Awards	2015	Best Costume Design	Into the Woods	Nominated	
Critics' Choice Awards	2016	Best Costume Design	Fantastic Beasts and Where to Find Them	Nominated	
Critics' Choice Awards	2026	Best Costume Design	Kiss of the Spider Woman	Nominated	
Disney Legends	2024	Costume Design	—N/a	Honored	
Empire Awards	2017	Best Costume Design	Fantastic Beasts and Where to Find Them	Won	
Hamilton Behind the Camera Awards	2025	Costume Design	One Battle After Another	Won	
Hollywood Beauty Awards	2026	Outstanding Achievement in Costume Design	—N/a	Honored	
Hollywood Film Awards	2005	Hollywood Costume Design Award	Memoirs of a Geisha	Won	
Hollywood Film Awards	2009	Hollywood Costume Design Award	Nine	Won	
Las Vegas Film Critics Society Awards	2000	Best Costume Design	Sleepy Hollow	Nominated	
Las Vegas Film Critics Society Awards	2007	Best Costume Design	Sweeney Todd: The Demon Barber of Fleet Street	Won	
Las Vegas Film Critics Society Awards	2010	Best Costume Design	Alice in Wonderland	Won	
Las Vegas Film Critics Society Awards	2016	Best Costume Design	Fantastic Beasts and Where to Find Them	Nominated	
Las Vegas Film Critics Society Awards	2025	Best Costume Design	Kiss of the Spider Woman	Nominated	
Middleburg Film Festival	2014	Distinguished Costume Designer	—N/a	Honored	
Newport Beach Film Festival	2024	Career Achievement in Costume Design	—N/a	Honored	
Online Film Critics Society Awards	2003	Best Costume Design	Chicago	Nominated	
Online Film Critics Society Awards	2026	Lifetime Achievement Award	—N/a	Honored	
Phoenix Film Critics Society Awards	2002	Best Costume Design	Planet of the Apes	Nominated	
Phoenix Film Critics Society Awards	2003	Best Costume Design	Chicago	Won	
Phoenix Film Critics Society Awards	2005	Best Costume Design	Memoirs of a Geisha	Won	
Phoenix Film Critics Society Awards	2007	Best Costume Design	Sweeney Todd: The Demon Barber of Fleet Street	Won	
Phoenix Film Critics Society Awards	2010	Best Costume Design	Alice in Wonderland	Won	
Phoenix Film Critics Society Awards	2014	Best Costume Design	Into the Woods	Nominated	
Phoenix Film Critics Society Awards	2016	Best Costume Design	Fantastic Beasts and Where to Find Them	Won	
SCAD Savannah Film Festival	2024	Variety’s Creative Impact in Costume Design	—N/a	Honored	
San Diego Film Critics Society Awards	2024	Best Costume Design	Beetlejuice Beetlejuice	Nominated	
Satellite Awards	1999	Best Costume Design	Beloved	Nominated	
Satellite Awards	2000	Best Costume Design	Sleepy Hollow	Won	
Satellite Awards	2002	Best Costume Design	Planet of the Apes	Nominated	
Satellite Awards	2005	Best Costume Design	Memoirs of a Geisha	Nominated	
Satellite Awards	2009	Best Costume Design	Nine	Nominated	
Satellite Awards	2010	Best Costume Design	Alice in Wonderland	Won	
Satellite Awards	2012	Best Costume Design	Snow White and the Huntsman	Nominated	
Satellite Awards	2015	Best Costume Design	Into the Woods	Nominated	
Satellite Awards	2017	Best Costume Design	Alice Through the Looking Glass	Nominated	
Satellite Awards	2019	Best Costume Design	Fantastic Beasts: The Crimes of Grindelwald	Nominated	
Saturn Awards	1992	Best Costume Design	Edward Scissorhands	Nominated	
Saturn Awards	1992	Best Costume Design	The Silence of the Lambs	Nominated	
Saturn Awards	1997	Best Costume Design	Mars Attacks!	Nominated	
Saturn Awards	1998	Best Costume Design	Gattaca	Nominated	
Saturn Awards	2000	Best Costume Design	Sleepy Hollow	Nominated	
Saturn Awards	2002	Best Costume Design	Planet of the Apes	Nominated	
Saturn Awards	2008	Best Costume Design	Sweeney Todd: The Demon Barber of Fleet Street	Won	
Saturn Awards	2010	Best Costume Design	Nine	Nominated	
Saturn Awards	2011	Best Costume Design	Alice in Wonderland	Won	
Saturn Awards	2013	Best Costume Design	Snow White and the Huntsman	Nominated	
Saturn Awards	2015	Best Costume Design	Into the Woods	Nominated	
Saturn Awards	2017	Best Costume Design	Fantastic Beasts and Where to Find Them	Won	
Saturn Awards	2017	Best Costume Design	Alice Through the Looking Glass	Nominated	
Saturn Awards	2025	Best Costume Design	Beetlejuice Beetlejuice	Won	
Venice Film Festival	2012	Gucci Award for Women in Cinema	Snow White and the Huntsman	Nominated	

== Bibliography ==
- Colleen Atwood Biography (1950-) filmreference
- "From Sketch to Still, a Visual History of Alice in Wonderland's Costumes". Vanity Fair. January 28, 2011.
