= Alexandra Byrne =

British costume designer (born 1962)

- Born: 1962 (age 63–64)
- Occupations: Costume designer; scenic designer
- Years active: 1993–present
- Spouse: Simon Shepherd (m. 1980)
- Children: 4

Alexandra Byrne (born 1962) is a British costume designer. She has received various accolades, including an Academy Award and a BAFTA Television Award, in addition to nominations for six BAFTA Film Awards and a Tony Award. Much of her career has focused on creating costumes for period dramas. These films include Persuasion (1995), Hamlet (1996), Elizabeth (1998), its sequel Elizabeth: The Golden Age (2007), Finding Neverland (2004), The Phantom of the Opera (2004), Mary Queen of Scots (2018), The Aeronauts (2019), and Emma. (2020).

Since 2011, Byrne has also designed the costumes for many films in the Marvel Cinematic Universe, including Thor (2011), The Avengers (2012), Guardians of the Galaxy (2014), Avengers: Age of Ultron (2015), Doctor Strange (2016), and The Fantastic Four: First Steps (2025).

== Life and career ==
=== Early life ===
Byrne was born in Hampshire, and grew up amidst many artistic influences. She was raised in Stratford-upon-Avon, where the Royal Shakespeare Company is based. She would later tell an interviewer that her career in theatre design was predestined, and she began by studying architecture with the intention of building sets in theatre. She encountered costume design when studying theatre design with the English National Opera. She later said, "I worked in the theatre for quite a few years, doing costume and set design. In England, it's very much both." She also trained with the Motley Theatre Design Course.

Byrne oversaw scenery and costumes for the 1989 comedy play Some Americans Abroad. Her work earned her a Tony Award nomination for Best Scenic Design. Despite her success, she was unsure if she would focus on set design or costume design. She decided on the latter when she was working on a television project for the BBC's Shakespeare series. Byrne said, "I was assisting a costume designer who was fantastic with fabric. It was with her that I actually thought, 'This is what it's all about. This is what I want to do'".

In 1993, Byrne created the costumes for all four parts of the TV serial The Buddha of Suburbia starring Naveen Andrews. For her costume work in the production, she received a nomination at the British Academy Television Awards.

=== Period films (1995–2007) ===
Byrne's first encounter with period costume dramas began when she was hired to create the costumes for the BBC film Persuasion. The production was an adaptation of the novel of the same name by Jane Austen, and featured Amanda Root as Anne Elliot. Byrne had also worked with the film's director, Roger Michell, on Some Americans Abroad and The Buddha of Suburbia. For her work in Persuasion, Byrne won the British Academy Television Award for Costume Design. The following year, Byrne created the costumes for the 1996 film Hamlet directed by and starring Kenneth Branagh, with whom she had previously worked on Life of Napoleon. She received her first Academy Award nomination for Best Costume Design.

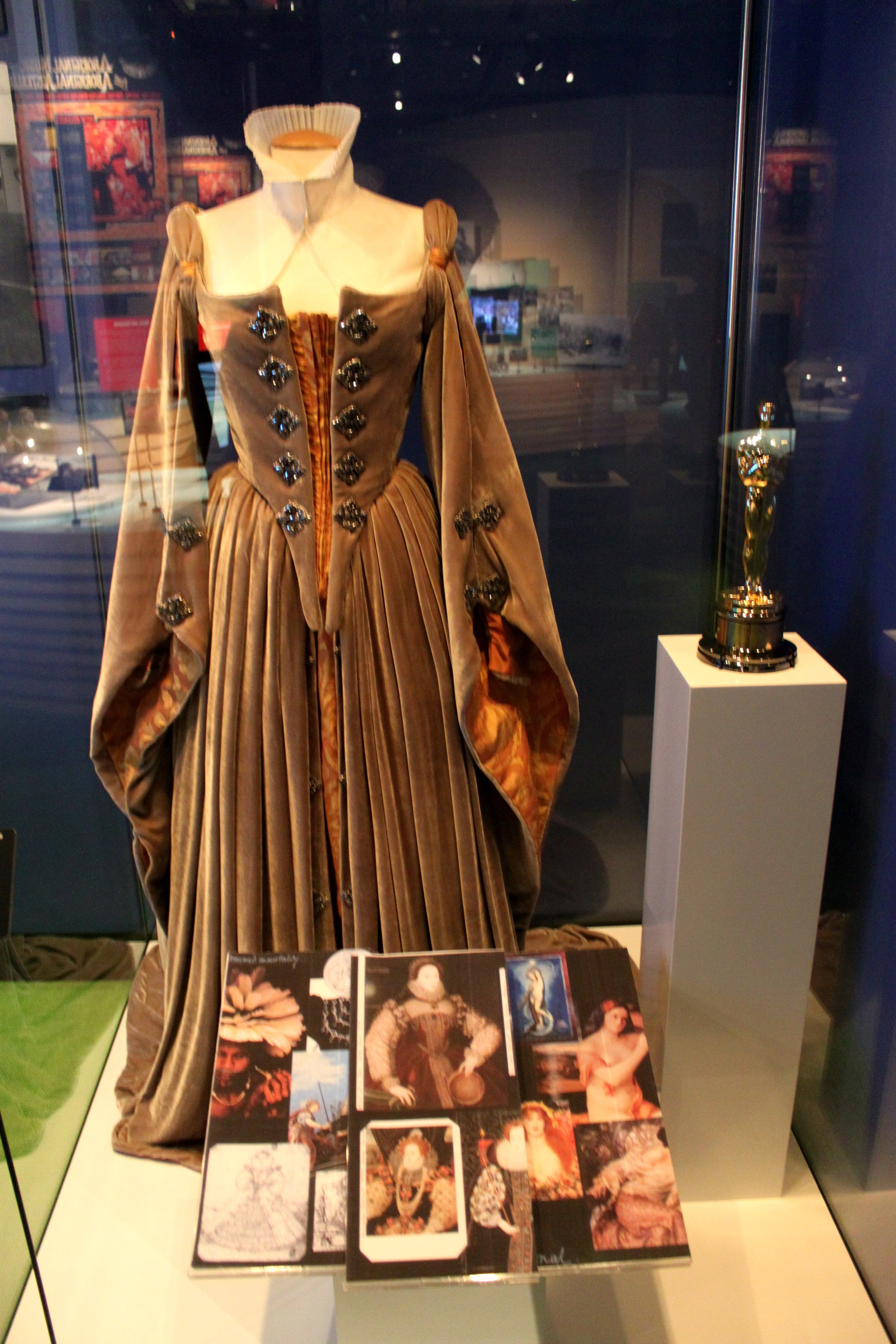
One of Byrne's designed costumes worn by Cate Blanchett in Elizabeth, on display at the Australian Centre for the Moving Image.

In 1998, Byrne served as the costume designer for the feature film Elizabeth, which starred Cate Blanchett as the last Tudor monarch. It featured high production values despite a limited budget. Director Shekhar Kapur discouraged historical research on Byrne's part, instead favouring clothing that focused on emotion. As a result, Byrne primarily designed costumes emphasising the theatrical rather than the historically accurate. When analysing the film, the scholar Bethany Latham stated that the production's silhouettes were "understated and barely Elizabethan," as they were not meant to distract from the film's plot among viewers. For Elizabeth, Byrne earned her second Academy Award nomination for Best Costume Design.

Byrne oversaw the costumes for the 2004 film Finding Neverland starring Johnny Depp and Kate Winslet. After completing it, Byrne said that when she worked on "a period film, however conceptual a piece it is, I research the period completely so that I absolutely know it. There were photographs from the first production of Peter Pan and of the Llewelyn Davies family". That year, Daily Variety reported that Byrne's "previous two Oscar noms make her a known commodity", and she again garnered a nomination for Best Costume Design at the Academy Awards.

Also in 2004, Byrne designed the costumes for the film The Phantom of the Opera. As research, she studied relics of the era such as paintings and original clothing. Her visits to Paris also gave her inspiration. As her ideas developed and were discussed with the filmmakers, they were placed on a "mood board" of visuals for her to reference. She eventually created 300 original costumes for the main characters, and produced at least 2,000 additional costumes for those in the background.

In 2007, Byrne designed the costumes for Elizabeth's sequel Elizabeth: The Golden Age, also starring Blanchett. As the sequel was set 27 years later, Byrne sought to create costumes for a confident queen "who has found her stride and established her style". Kapur did not feel Elizabeth: The Golden Age had to be historically accurate, giving Byrne the freedom to make his film "look very different, much lighter, with a more feminine court". For her costume design work in the film, Byrne was again nominated for the Academy Award, this time winning.

=== Marvel films (2011–2016) ===
Since 2011, much of Byrne's career has focused on films in the Marvel Cinematic Universe. Her first contribution to the franchise, Thor (2011), resulted when she was hired by the film's director, Kenneth Branagh. She had also worked with Branagh on previous productions such as Hamlet (1996) and Sleuth (2007). Byrne took inspiration from the Thor comics and the artwork of Jack Kirby, which she described as "amazing". She later said that for Thor's character, "it's all about his arms". After Thor, Byrne's next Marvel project was the 2012 film The Avengers, where she oversaw a team of over 60 people.

She followed The Avengers with Guardians of the Galaxy in 2014, which she described as having a "very retro, pulpy feel". As with Thor, Byrne found much of her inspiration from the comics. The production's main actor, Chris Pratt, was hired before he had lost enough body weight, forcing Byrne to anticipate what his physical form would become. When describing Pratt's character Star-Lord in Guardians of the Galaxy, Byrne said he "was all about the swagger, but without vanity" and designed a red jacket for him that was heavily treated cotton, though it looked like real leather. Her next project, Avengers: Age of Ultron, arrived in cinemas in May 2015.

Byrne is the costume designer for the 2016 Marvel film Doctor Strange starring Benedict Cumberbatch, which began shooting in November 2015 at Pinewood-Shepperton studios in the UK. For Strange's famous Cloak of Levitation, Byrne estimated that twelve different versions were completed by a team of designers. She sought to incorporate subtle details while avoiding making it "over-embellish[ed] and decorative".

== Personal life ==
Byrne married English actor Simon Shepherd in 1980.

== Filmography ==
=== Film ===
Year	Title	Director
1996	Hamlet	Kenneth Branagh
1998	Elizabeth	Shekhar Kapur
2001	Captain Corelli's Mandolin	John Madden
2004	Finding Neverland	Marc Forster
2004	The Phantom of the Opera	Joel Schumacher
2007	Elizabeth: The Golden Age	Shekhar Kapur
2007	Sleuth	Kenneth Branagh
2008	The Garden of Eden	John Irvin
2011	Thor	Kenneth Branagh
2012	The Avengers	Joss Whedon
2014	300: Rise of an Empire	Noam Murro
2014	Guardians of the Galaxy	James Gunn
2015	Avengers: Age of Ultron	Joss Whedon
2016	Doctor Strange	Scott Derrickson
2017	Murder on the Orient Express	Kenneth Branagh
2018	Mowgli: Legend of the Jungle	Andy Serkis
2018	Mary Queen of Scots	Josie Rourke
2019	The Aeronauts	Tom Harper
2020	Emma. (Note: The title of the film has a period attached to signify it being a period piece.)	Autumn de Wilde
2021	The Mauritanian	Kevin Macdonald
2022	Empire of Light	Sam Mendes
2023	The Flash	Andy Muschietti
2025	The Fantastic Four: First Steps	Matt Shakman
2026	Practical Magic 2	Susanne Bier

=== Television ===
Year	Title	Notes
1993	The Buddha of Suburbia	4 episodes
1995	Persuasion	Television film

== Awards and nominations ==
Major associations

Academy Awards

Year	Category	Nominated work	Result	Ref.
1997	Best Costume Design	Hamlet	Nominated	
1999	Best Costume Design	Elizabeth	Nominated	
2005	Best Costume Design	Finding Neverland	Nominated	
2008	Best Costume Design	Elizabeth: The Golden Age	Won	
2019	Best Costume Design	Mary Queen of Scots	Nominated	
2021	Best Costume Design	Emma.	Nominated	

BAFTA Awards

Year	Category	Nominated work	Result	Ref.
British Academy Film Awards
1997	Best Costume Design	Hamlet	Nominated	
1999	Best Costume Design	Elizabeth	Nominated	
2005	Best Costume Design	Finding Neverland	Nominated	
2008	Best Costume Design	Elizabeth: The Golden Age	Nominated	
2019	Best Costume Design	Mary Queen of Scots	Nominated	
2021	Best Costume Design	Emma.	Nominated	
British Academy Television Craft Awards
1994	Best Costume Design	The Buddha of Suburbia	Nominated	
1996	Best Costume Design	Persuasion	Won	

Tony Awards

Year	Category	Nominated work	Result	Ref.
1990	Best Scenic Design	Some Americans Abroad	Nominated	

Miscellaneous awards

List of Alexandra Byrne other awards and nominations
Award	Year (Note: Indicates the year of ceremony. Each year is linked to the article about the awards held that year, wherever possible.)	Category	Title	Result	Ref.
Astra Film and Creative Arts Awards	2021	Best Costume Design	Emma.	Nominated	
Capri Hollywood International Film Festival	2007	Capri Umberto Tirelli Award	Elizabeth: The Golden Age	Won	
Chicago Film Critics Association Awards	2020	Best Costume Design	Emma.	Won	
Costume Designers Guild Awards	2005	Excellence in Period/Fantasy Film	The Phantom of the Opera	Nominated	
Costume Designers Guild Awards	2008	Excellence in Period Film	Elizabeth: The Golden Age	Nominated	
Costume Designers Guild Awards	2012	Excellence in Fantasy Film	Thor	Nominated	
Costume Designers Guild Awards	2015	Excellence in Fantasy Film	Guardians of the Galaxy	Nominated	
Costume Designers Guild Awards	2017	Excellence in Fantasy Film	Doctor Strange	Won	
Costume Designers Guild Awards	2018	Excellence in Period Film	Murder on the Orient Express	Nominated	
Costume Designers Guild Awards	2019	Excellence in Period Film	Mary Queen of Scots	Nominated	
Costume Designers Guild Awards	2021	Excellence in Period Film	Emma.	Nominated	
Critics' Choice Awards	2019	Best Costume Design	Mary Queen of Scots	Nominated	
Critics' Choice Awards	2021	Best Costume Design	Emma.	Nominated	
Empire Awards	2017	Best Costume Design	Doctor Strange	Nominated	
Empire Awards	2018	Best Costume Design	Guardians of the Galaxy Vol. 2	Nominated	
Las Vegas Film Critics Society Awards	2014	Best Costume Design	Guardians of the Galaxy	Won	
Las Vegas Film Critics Society Awards	2017	Best Costume Design	Murder on the Orient Express	Runner-up	
Online Film Critics Society Awards	2021	Technical Achievement Award	Emma.	Won	
Phoenix Film Critics Society Awards	2017	Best Costume Design	Murder on the Orient Express	Nominated	
Royal Television Society Craft & Design Awards	1995	Best Costume Design – Drama	Persuasion	Won	
San Diego Film Critics Society Awards	2021	Best Costume Design	Emma.	Won	
San Diego Film Critics Society Awards	2025	Best Costume Design	The Fantastic Four: First Steps	Nominated	
Santa Barbara International Film Festival	2021	Variety Artisans Award	Emma.	Won	
Satellite Awards	1997	Best Costume Design	Hamlet	Nominated	
Satellite Awards	1999	Best Costume Design	Elizabeth	Won	
Satellite Awards	2005	Best Costume Design	The Phantom of the Opera	Nominated	
Satellite Awards	2007	Best Costume Design	Elizabeth: The Golden Age	Won	
Satellite Awards	2017	Best Costume Design	Doctor Strange	Nominated	
Satellite Awards	2018	Best Costume Design	Murder on the Orient Express	Nominated	
Satellite Awards	2019	Best Costume Design	Mary Queen of Scots	Nominated	
Satellite Awards	2021	Best Costume Design	Emma.	Nominated	
Satellite Awards	2023	Best Costume Design	Empire of Light	Nominated	
Saturn Awards	2005	Best Costume Design	The Phantom of the Opera	Nominated	
Saturn Awards	2012	Best Costume Design	Thor	Won	
Saturn Awards	2015	Best Costume Design	Guardians of the Galaxy	Nominated	
Saturn Awards	2016	Best Costume Design	Avengers: Age of Ultron	Won	
Saturn Awards	2017	Best Costume Design	Doctor Strange	Nominated	
Saturn Awards	2026	Best Costume Design	The Fantastic Four: First Steps	Nominated	
Seattle Film Critics Society Awards	2021	Best Costume Design	Emma.	Nominated	
