= 2nd Costume Designers Guild Awards =

Award ceremony for film and television costuming in 1999

- Date: February 12, 2000
- Location: Beverly Wilshire Hotel, Beverly Hills, California
- Country: United States
- Presented by: Costume Designers Guild
- Hosted by: Angelica Huston

Highlights
- Excellence in Contemporary Film: American Beauty – Julie Weiss
- Excellence in Period/Fantasy Film: Sleepy Hollow – Colleen Atwood

The 2nd Costume Designers Guild Awards, honoring excellence in film and television costume design for 1999, were held on February 12, 2000, at the Beverly Wilshire Hotel in Beverly Hills, California, and hosted for the second year in succession by Anjelica Huston. The nominees were announced in January 2000.

This year, due to the waning growing popularity of the award, Excellence in Film and Excellence in Television, previously merged into single awards, were divided into separate contemporary and fantasy/period categories.

== Winners and nominees ==
Winners are listed first and in bold.

=== Film ===
Excellence in Contemporary Film	Excellence in Period/Fantasy Film
**American Beauty – Julie Weiss**; Cookie's Fortune – Dona Granata; Eyes Wide Shut – Marit Allen; Fight Club – Michael Kaplan	**Sleepy Hollow – Colleen Atwood**; Austin Powers: The Spy Who Shagged Me – Deena Appel; The Matrix – Kym Barrett; The Talented Mr. Ripley – Gary Jones and Ann Roth

=== Television ===
Excellence in Contemporary Television	Excellence in Period/Fantasy Television
**Sex and the City – Patricia Field**; 3rd Rock from the Sun – Melina Root; Ally McBeal – Rachael Stanley; Tracey Takes On... – Jane Ruhm	**Annie – Shay Cunliffe**; A Lesson Before Dying – Hope Hanafin; Sarah, Plain and Tall: Winter's End – Carol Ramsey; That '70s Show – Melina Root; The Magnificent Seven – Dan Moore

=== Special awards ===
==== Career Achievement Award ====
- Theoni Aldredge (film)
- Anthony Powell (film)
- Nolan Miller (television)

==== Distinguished Producer Award ====
- Aaron Spelling

==== Hall of Fame ====
- Walter Plunkett
- Orry-Kelly
