= 5th Costume Designers Guild Awards =

Award ceremony for film and television costuming in 2002

- Date: February 16, 2003
- Location: Beverly Wilshire Hotel, Beverly Hills, California
- Country: United States
- Presented by: Costume Designers Guild
- Hosted by: Anjelica Huston

Highlights
- Excellence in Contemporary Film: About Schmidt – Wendy Chuck
- Excellence in Period/Fantasy Film: Chicago – Colleen Atwood

The 5th Costume Designers Guild Awards, given on February 16, 2003, honored the best costume designs in film and television for 2002. The nominees were announced on January 21, 2003.

== Winners and nominees ==
The winners are in bold.

=== Film ===
Excellence in Contemporary Film	Excellence in Period/Fantasy Film
**About Schmidt – Wendy Chuck**; About a Boy – Joanna Johnston; Igby Goes Down – Sarah Edwards; Unfaithful – Ellen Mirojnick; White Oleander – Susie DeSanto	**Chicago – Colleen Atwood**; Frida – Julie Weiss; The Lord of the Rings: The Two Towers – Ngila Dickson; Road to Perdition – Albert Wolsky

=== Television ===
Excellence in Contemporary Television	Excellence in Period/Fantasy Television
**Alias – Laura Goldsmith**; Sex and the City – Patricia Field; Six Feet Under – Gail McMullen; The Sopranos – Juliet Polcsa	**American Dreams – Jane Anderson**; Fidel – Mayes C. Rubeo; The Rosa Parks Story – Karen Perry; That '70s Show – Melina Root

=== Special awards ===
==== Career Achievement Award ====
- Ann Roth (film)
- Rita Riggs (television)

==== President’s Award ====
- Piero Tosi

==== Distinguished Actor Award ====
- Dustin Hoffman

==== Hall of Fame ====
- Wayne Finkleman
- Mitchell Leisen
- Natacha Rambova
- Clare West
