= Wasteland (American TV series) =

- Genre: Drama
- Created by: Kevin Williamson
- Starring: Sasha Alexander; Marisa Coughlan; Rebecca Gayheart; Eddie Mills; Dan Montgomery Jr.; Brad Rowe
- Country of origin: United States
- Original language: English
- No. of seasons: 1
- No. of episodes: 13 (9 unaired)

Production
- Executive producer: Kevin Williamson
- Running time: 60 minutes
- Production companies: Outerbanks Entertainment; Miramax Television

Original release
- Network: ABC
- Release: October 7 – October 21, 1999

Wasteland is an American drama that aired on ABC from October 7 until October 21, 1999. The show was created by Kevin Williamson and produced by Outerbanks Entertainment and Miramax Television. It explored such topics as college, friendships, romance and homosexuality. It aired only three episodes in October 1999 before ABC canceled it. However, Showtime's ShowNext channel aired the 10 remaining episodes in 2001.

Justin Theroux says he turned down a role in Wasteland to star in Mulholland Drive, which was initially commissioned as a television pilot by ABC and went into production around the same time.

== Summary ==
Wasteland tells the story of six friends after college. Dawnie is a graduate student writing a thesis on the "Lost Generation", and at 27, she is standing strong as a virgin. Alongside are her two best female friends: Sam, a sassy social worker, and Jesse, a publicist obsessed with the downtown dating scene. Other characters include Vandy, a musician by day, bartender by night who still carries a torch for Sam, Ty, who reappears after dumping Dawnie for not "putting out", and Russell, a gay soap opera star terrified of being out and Ty's college roommate.

== Cast ==
- Sasha Alexander as Jesse Presser
- Marisa Coughlan as Dawnie Parker
- Rebecca Gayheart as Samantha 'Sam' Price
- Eddie Mills as Vandy
- Dan Montgomery Jr. as Russell Baskind
- Brad Rowe as Tyler 'Ty' Swindell
- Jeffrey D. Sams as Vincent 'Vince' Lewis

=== Notable guest appearances ===
- Adam Scott as Phillip The Coffee Boy
- Benjamin Markham as Gothic Bill
- Frank Grillo as Cliff Dobbs
- Robert Sean Leonard as Jesse's ex

== Episodes ==
No.	Title	Directed by	Written by	Original release date
1	"Pilot"	Steve Miner	Kevin Williamson	October 7, 1999
2	"Empty Pockets"	Michael Schultz	Kevin Williamson	October 14, 1999
3	"Double Date"	Stephen Gyllenhaal	Maggie Friedman	October 21, 1999
4	"Indian Summer"	Keith Samples	Heidi Ferrer	Unaired
5	"My Ex-Friend's Wedding"	Arlene Sanford	Jim Praytor & Andi Bushell	Unaired
6	"Best Laid Plans"	Sandy Smolan	Story by : Kimberly Costello; Teleplay by : Jim Praytor & Andi Bushell & Maggie Friedman	Unaired
7	"Thanks for Nothin'"	Rick Rosenthal	Jim Praytor & Andi Bushell	Unaired
8	"Truth or Consequences"	Kenny Ortega	Kevin Arkadie	Unaired
9	"The Object of My Affection"	Sandy Smolan	Maggie Friedman	Unaired
10	"Great Expectations"	Lou Antonio	Kip Koenig	Unaired
11	"The Morning After"	Joe Napolitano	Maggie Friedman & Jim Praytor & Andi Bushell	Unaired
12	"Defying Moments"	Melanie Mayron	Pamela Parker & Damon Lindelof	Unaired
13	"Death Becomes Us"	Patrick R. Norris	Story by : Damon Lindelof & Pamela Parker; Teleplay by : Jim Praytor & Andi Bushell & Maggie Friedman	Unaired
