= Elizabeth: The Golden Age =

2007 film by Shekhar Kapur

- Theatrical release poster
- Directed by: Shekhar Kapur
- Written by: William Nicholson; Michael Hirst
- Produced by: Tim Bevan; Eric Fellner; Jonathan Cavendish
- Starring: Cate Blanchett; Geoffrey Rush; Clive Owen; Rhys Ifans; Jordi Mollà; Abbie Cornish; Samantha Morton
- Cinematography: Remi Adefarasin
- Edited by: Jill Bilcock
- Music by: Craig Armstrong; A. R. Rahman
- Production companies: StudioCanal; Working Title Films
- Distributed by: Universal Pictures (international); StudioCanal (France)
- Release dates: 12 October 2007 (United States); 2 November 2007 (United Kingdom)
- Running time: 114 minutes
- Countries: United Kingdom; France; Germany
- Language: English
- Budget: $55 million
- Box office: $75.8 million

Elizabeth: The Golden Age is a 2007 biographical historical drama film directed by Shekhar Kapur and produced by Universal Pictures and Working Title Films. It stars Cate Blanchett in the title role and is a loose but fact-based portrayal of events during the latter part of the reign of Elizabeth I, forming a sequel to Kapur's 1998 film Elizabeth. The film co-stars Geoffrey Rush (reprising his role from the previous film), Clive Owen, Jordi Mollà, Abbie Cornish, and Samantha Morton. The screenplay was written by William Nicholson and Michael Hirst, and the score composed by Craig Armstrong and A. R. Rahman. Guy Hendrix Dyas was the film's production designer and co-visual effects supervisor, and the costumes were created by Alexandra Byrne. The film was shot at Shepperton Studios and locations around the United Kingdom.

The film premiered on 9 September 2007 at the Toronto International Film Festival. It opened in wide release in the United States on 12 October 2007, premiered in London on 23 October 2007, and opened wide on 2 November 2007 throughout the rest of the UK and Republic of Ireland. At the 80th Academy Awards, the film won Best Costume Design and Blanchett received a nomination for Best Actress.

== Plot ==
In 1585, Catholic Spain, ruled by King Philip II, is the most powerful country in Europe. Seeing that the Catholic plots against Queen Elizabeth's life that occurred from the 1570s onwards had all failed, Pope Sixtus V approached King Philip, who had amassed the most significant naval force in all of Europe, and convinces him to use this naval force to invade and re-Catholicise England. By doing so, Philip, with the pope's blessing, would overthrow Elizabeth and take control of England. Philip agrees and plots to take over England and install his daughter, Isabella, as Queen of England in Elizabeth's place. Meanwhile, Elizabeth is being pressured by her advisor, Francis Walsingham, to marry; if Elizabeth dies childless, the throne will pass to her first cousin, Mary, Queen of Scots, who is Catholic.

English explorer Walter Raleigh is presented at court, having returned from the New World. Queen Elizabeth is attracted to Raleigh, enthralled by his tales of exploration, and asks Elizabeth "Bess" Throckmorton, her most favoured lady-in-waiting, to observe him. Bess also finds Raleigh attractive and they begin a secret affair. With tensions strained between England and Spain, Elizabeth seeks guidance from her astrologer, Dr. John Dee.

Jesuits in London conspire with Philip to assassinate Elizabeth and replace her with Mary of Scots, in what King Philip calls "The English Enterprise," historically known as the Babington Plot. From her imprisonment, Mary sends secret correspondence to the Jesuits, who recruit Anthony Babington to assassinate Elizabeth. Walsingham continues to warn Queen Elizabeth of Spain's rising power and of the Catholic plots against her, but unlike her predecessor and half-sister, Queen Mary, Elizabeth refuses to force her people to share her religious beliefs.

Walsingham's Catholic brother, who knows of the plot against Elizabeth, is jailed, leading Walsingham to reveal Spain's plan to Queen Elizabeth, who angrily confronts the Spanish diplomats. The Spanish ambassador feigns ignorance, accuses her of receiving stolen Spanish gold from pirates, and insinuates that she has a sexual relationship with Raleigh. Enraged, Elizabeth throws the Spaniards out of England. Meanwhile, Philip is cutting down the forests of Spain to build the Spanish Armada to invade England. Mary writes letters condoning the plot.

Babington storms into a cathedral where Elizabeth is praying and fires a pistol at her, though Elizabeth is unharmed as there was no bullet in the gun. As Elizabeth learns of Mary's involvement in the plot, Walsingham insists Mary be executed to quell any possible revolt. Elizabeth reluctantly agrees. Mary is tried for high treason and beheaded; Walsingham realises this was part of the Jesuits' plan all along: Philip never intended for Mary to become queen, but with the Pope and other Catholic leaders regarding Mary as the true Queen of England, Philip uses Mary's death to obtain papal approval for war. The "murder" of the last legitimate Catholic claimant to the throne gives Philip the pretext he needs to invade England and remove Elizabeth, leaving the way to the English throne free for his own daughter.

Bess reveals to Raleigh that she is pregnant with his child, and pleads with him to leave. Instead, the couple marry in secret. When Elizabeth confronts Bess, she confesses her pregnancy and that Raleigh is her husband. An infuriated Elizabeth berates Bess, reminding her that she cannot marry without royal consent. She banishes Bess from court and has Raleigh imprisoned for the crime of seducing a ward of the queen.

As the Spanish Armada begins its approach up the English Channel, Elizabeth forgives Bess and sets Raleigh free to join Sir Francis Drake in battle. The ships of the Armada vastly outnumber England's, but a storm blows the Armada toward the beaches, endangering its formation and becoming vulnerable to English fire ships. Elizabeth, at her coastal headquarters, walks out to the cliffs and watches the Spanish Armada sink in flames as the English fleet prevails.

She visits Raleigh and Bess and blesses their child. Elizabeth appears to triumph personally through her ordeal, again resigned to her role as the Virgin Queen and mother to the English people.

== Cast ==
- Cate Blanchett as Queen Elizabeth I
- Geoffrey Rush as Sir Francis Walsingham
- Clive Owen as Sir Walter Raleigh
- Abbie Cornish as Elizabeth "Bess" Throckmorton
- Samantha Morton as Mary, Queen of Scots
- Jordi Mollà as King Philip II of Spain
- Susan Lynch as Annette Fleming
- Rhys Ifans as Robert Reston
- Eddie Redmayne as Anthony Babington
- Tom Hollander as Amias Paulet
- Steven Robertson as Sir Francis Throckmorton
- Adam Godley as William Walsingham
- Laurence Fox as Sir Christopher Hatton
- William Houston as Guerau de Espés
- David Threlfall as John Dee
- Christian Brassington as Charles II, Archduke of Austria
- John Shrapnel as Charles Howard, 1st Earl of Nottingham
- Kelly Hunter as Ursula Walsingham
- Kirstin Smith as Mary Walsingham
- Benjamin May as Dance Tutor
- Kate Fleetwood as the Mother
- Aimee King as Infanta Isabel of Spain
- David Robb as Sir William Wynter
- Jonathan Bailey as a courtier
- Malcolm Storry as Sir Francis Drake (uncredited)

== Production ==
Principal photography began 28 April 2006 and completed on 1 August 2006.

=== Historical background ===
In November 1558, King Philip II of Spain's second wife, Queen Mary I of England, died. They had married in July 1554, a year after Mary's accession to the English throne, but the English Parliament had refused to grant him much real power as co-monarch of England. On Mary's death he tried unsuccessfully to persuade her sister and successor, Elizabeth I, to marry him.

For many years Philip maintained peace with England, and even defended Elizabeth from the Pope's threat of excommunication. This was a measure taken to preserve a European balance of power. Ultimately, Elizabeth allied England with the Protestant rebels in the Netherlands. Further, English ships began a policy of piracy against Spanish trade and threatened to plunder the great Spanish treasure ships coming from the New World. English ships went so far as to attack a Spanish port. The last straw for Philip was the Treaty of Nonsuch signed by Elizabeth in 1585 – promising troops and supplies to the rebels. Although it can be argued this English action was the result of Philip's Treaty of Joinville with the Catholic League of France, Philip considered it an act of war by England. With the Pope's blessing, he launched the Spanish Armada to attack England, Protestantism, and Elizabeth herself. Sir Walter Raleigh, whom the Queen favoured, married Bess Throckmorton, a ward of Elizabeth's court, after learning she was carrying his child. Elizabeth I had both of them arrested and imprisoned in the Tower of London, but later released them.

=== Dramatic licence ===
This representation of a historical period is heavily fictionalised for the purposes of entertainment. The film's lead Cate Blanchett was reported as saying: "It's terrifying that we are growing up with this very illiterate bunch of children, who are somehow being taught that film is fact, when in fact it's invention". Some of the simpler fictions are:

- Sir Walter Raleigh is falsely portrayed as a major figure in the defeat of the Spanish Armada, and the film does not credit Sir Francis Drake and other key leaders of the English fleet (a character called "Drake" does appear during the battle with the Spanish; the role is played, uncredited, by actor Malcolm Storry).
- Robert Dudley, 1st Earl of Leicester, was lieutenant general at the Armada crisis, but in the film, he is not present at the Tilbury camp, his role having been given to Raleigh. The movie also does not make mention of Dudley's military campaign in the Netherlands.
- Charles Howard (then Lord Howard of Effingham, the actual commander of the English fleet), says at one point, "We're losing too many ships." In reality, not a single English ship was lost during the battle.
- The film depicts Elizabeth being advised by Dr John Dee. Historically, Dee was travelling on the European mainland throughout the period depicted and did not return until more than a year after the defeat of the Armada. Elizabeth's actual main advisor and chief minister, William Cecil, 1st Baron Burghley, is omitted from the film altogether.
- The portrayed Jesuit leader of the Babington Plot, Robert Reston, is completely fictional, though based on the real-life Jesuit John Ballard, who encouraged Babington to initiate the assassination attempt on Elizabeth, which would subsequently begin the chain of events leading to the Spanish invasion. However, because Ballard was depicted being executed in the previous film for participating in the Ridolfi plot, the role of Reston was created to replace him.
- In the film, Elizabeth is confronted at the altar of Old St Paul's Cathedral by Anthony Babington, who has a pistol charged with powder but no shot. The real Babington Plot was, like preceding plots against Elizabeth, discovered and thwarted by Francis Walsingham's investigative efforts while still in the planning stages, long before there was any actual attempt to kill Elizabeth.
- The film also depicts Babington (and, implicitly, the other conspirators) as having been hanged by long drop, rather than the actual, and more gruesome method of hanging, drawing and quartering.
- In 1585, Elizabeth was 52 (considered too old to bear children). The film shows various suitors being presented to the queen, with a view to marriage and children; the events presented actually took place much earlier in her reign. For instance, Erik XIV of Sweden abandoned his proposals to marry Elizabeth after his trip to England was interrupted by his father's death in 1560, when Elizabeth was 27. In fact, by 1568, Erik had been deposed from the Swedish throne and died in captivity in 1577. Likewise, marriage negotiations with Charles II, Archduke of Austria were abandoned in 1568 and in 1571, Charles married his niece Maria Anna of Bavaria, with whom he had fifteen children.
- Philip II of Spain is depicted at the time of the Armada as an old, sick man. In fact he was just six years older than Elizabeth, and his death did not occur until ten years later, in 1598.
- In 1588, Infanta Isabel of Spain is portrayed as a child. In reality, she was 21 by this time.
- William Walsingham is a completely fictitious character. The real William Walsingham was the father of Francis Walsingham.
- Mary Walsingham, Walsingham's daughter in the film, died in 1580. Frances Walsingham was the surviving daughter who married Philip Sidney.
- The lady-in-waiting Bess Throckmorton in fact became pregnant with Walter Raleigh's child in the summer of 1591, three years after the defeat of the Armada, not immediately before. After their secret marriage was inevitably discovered, Elizabeth had them imprisoned in the Tower of London. While she did eventually release them both, it was not out of any sense of forgiveness as the movie depicts. She released Raleigh because one of his expeditions returned to England with a captured Spanish ship, the Madre de Dios, and his men threatened a mutiny if she did not return Raleigh to them. Bess was released because Elizabeth felt guilty after Bess's baby died of plague while she was incarcerated in the Tower.
- The affair between Raleigh and Bess is depicted as beginning when Raleigh consoles Bess after her cousin Francis is executed for his plot to assassinate Elizabeth, but that happened six years before the affair actually took place.
- Mary, Queen of Scots is depicted as having a Scottish accent, when in actuality, she had been raised at the French court from the age of five and did not return to Scotland until she was a young woman.
- The film shows Spanish envoys and other members of court wearing swords during their audiences with Elizabeth. Owing to threats of assassination, only members of the Royal Guard were permitted to carry weapons near Elizabeth while she was in court.
- The execution of Mary, Queen of Scots, is portrayed as having happened very swiftly after her arrest, while she was still a young woman. In fact, Mary was held in custody at various places for 19 years before her execution in 1587, at the age of 44.
- The film depicts the battle between the English navy and the Spanish Armada as consisting of broadsides from the ships of both fleets. In fact, while the English ships were able to fire multiple times during the course of a day, the heavy Spanish guns were so difficult to reload that they were frequently only fired once. Broadsides would accompany later developments in ship design in the first half of the 17th century, the first major actions involving such technology and tactics for the English being the Anglo-Dutch Wars.
- During the film, Elizabeth spoke German to Charles II, Archduke of Austria. Although Elizabeth spoke several languages there is no evidence that she was taught or spoke German; nor is it likely that they ever met.
- There was no Spanish ambassador in Elizabeth's court in 1585, as Elizabeth had him expelled from England following the discovery of the Throckmorton plot, after Francis Throckmorton claimed under torture that his plot had been sanctioned by the Spanish.

==== Claims of anti-Catholicism ====
The film depicts an important episode in the violent struggle between the Protestant Reformation and the Counter-Reformation that polarised European politics. Several critics (some cited below) claimed the film was "anti-Catholic" and followed a traditional English view of their own history.

In the US the National Catholic Register, film critic Steven D. Greydanus compared this film to The Da Vinci Code, and wrote: "The climax, a weakly staged destruction of the Spanish Armada, is a crescendo of church-bashing imagery: rosaries floating amid burning flotsam, inverted crucifixes sinking to the bottom of the ocean, the rows of ominous berobed clerics slinking away in defeat. Pound for pound, minute for minute, Elizabeth: The Golden Age could possibly contain more sustained church-bashing than any other film I can think of." Greydanus asked: "How is it possible that this orgy of anti-Catholicism has been all but ignored by most critics?"

Stephen Whitty of the Newark Star-Ledger said: "This movie equates Catholicism with some sort of horror-movie cult, with scary close-ups of chanting monks and glinting crucifixes." Colin Covert of the Minneapolis Star Tribune complained of what he saw as "ugly anti-Catholic imagery", and Bob Bloom of the Lafayette Journal & Courier agreed that anti-Catholicism was one of the film's "sore points".

Monsignor Mark Langham, Administrator of Westminster Cathedral, was criticised by some Roman Catholics for allowing scenes to be shot there; although praising the film as a "must see", he suggested that "it does appear to perpetuate the myth of 'killer priests'".

Historian Franco Cardini, of the University of Florence, alleged "the film formed part of a 'concerted attack on Catholicism, the Holy See and Papism' by an alliance of atheists and 'apocalyptic Christians'". "Why put out this perverse anti-Catholic propaganda today, just at the moment when we are trying desperately to revive our Western identity in the face of the Islamic threat, presumed or real?"

Director Shekhar Kapur rejected this criticism of his film, saying: "It is actually very, very deeply non-anti-Catholic. It is anti extreme forms of religion. At that time the church in Spain, or Philip had said that they were going to turn the whole world into a very pure form of Catholicism. So it's not anti-Catholic. It's anti an interpretation of the word of God that is singular, as against what Elizabeth's was, which was to look upon her faith as concomitant." "The fact is that the Pope ordered her execution; he said that anybody who executes or assassinates Elizabeth would find a beautiful place in the kingdom of heaven. Where else have you heard these words about Salman Khan or Salman Rushdie? That's why I made this film, so this idea of a rift between Catholicism and Protestants does not arise. My interpretation of Elizabeth is an interpretation of greater tolerance [than] Philip, which is absolutely true. It's completely true that she had this kind of feminine energy. It's a conflict between Philip, who had no ability to encompass diversity or contradiction, and Elizabeth who had the feminine ability to do that."

Kapur extended this pluralist defence to his own approach: "I would describe all history as fiction and interpretation ... [A]sk any Catholic and they'll give you a totally different aspect of history ... History has always been an interpretation ... I do believe that civilisations that don't learn from history are civilisations that are doomed to make the same mistakes again and again, which is why this film starts with the idea of fundamentalism against tolerance. It's not Catholic against Protestant; it's a very fundamental form of Catholicism. It was the time of the Spanish Inquisition and against a woman whose half of her population was Protestant, half was Catholic. And there were enough bigots in her Protestant Parliament to say, 'Just kill them all', and she was constantly saying no. She was constantly on the side of tolerance. So you interpret history to tell the story that is relevant to us now."

=== Filming locations ===
- Baddesley Clinton, Warwickshire, England, UK (Raleigh's house exteriors)
- Brean Down, Weston-super-Mare, Somerset, England (Queen Elizabeth addresses her troops)
- Burghley House, Stamford, Lincolnshire, England (John Dee's house exteriors/London alley/Paris street scene)
- Burnham-on-Sea, Somerset, England
- Dorney Court, Dorney, Buckinghamshire, England (Raleigh's house/Walsingham's house/chapel interiors)
- Doune Castle, Doune, Stirling, Scotland
- Eilean Donan Castle, Kyle of Lochalsh, Highland, Scotland (Fotheringhay Castle exteriors)
- Ely Cathedral, Ely, Cambridgeshire, England (Whitehall Palace interior)
- Hatfield House, Hatfield, Hertfordshire, England (Chartley Hall, also the interior of Walsingham's house)
- Leeds Castle, Kent, England (Chartley Hall/Windsor Castle exteriors)
- Petworth House, Petworth, West Sussex, England (Windsor Great Park)
- Shepperton Studios, Shepperton, Surrey, England
- St. Bartholomew's Hospital, London, England (Fotheringhay Castle/Chartley Hall interiors)
- St John's College, Cambridge, Cambridge, Cambridgeshire, England (Whitehall Palace exteriors/Thames scenes)
- Wells Cathedral, Wells, Somerset, England (Whitehall Palace interiors)
- Westminster Cathedral, Westminster, London, England (Escorial Palace/Lisbon Cathedral interiors)
- Winchester Cathedral, Winchester, Hampshire, England, (St. Paul's Cathedral/The Chapel Royal interiors/gallows scene)

== Soundtrack ==
Elizabeth: The Golden Age: Music from the Motion Picture

Soundtrack album by Craig Armstrong and A. R. Rahman
- Released: October 2007
- Studios: AIR, London, UK
- Genre: Soundtrack
- Length: 48:10
- Label: Decca
- Producers: A. R. Rahman; Craig Armstrong; Geoffrey Rush

A. R. Rahman chronology
Azhagiya Tamil Magan (2007)	Elizabeth: The Golden Age: Music from the Motion Picture (2007)	Jodhaa Akbar (2008)

Craig Armstrong chronology
World Trade Center (2006)	Elizabeth: The Golden Age: Music from the Motion Picture (2007)	The Incredible Hulk: Original Motion Picture Score (2008)

The original score was composed by A. R. Rahman and Craig Armstrong. Kapur was thrilled to have both Rahman and Armstrong working together on the music, saying it was fascinating to watch "two people with totally different backgrounds and cultures" interact.

Blanchett had travelled to India in the early 2000s, coming away with several Indian sounds, and badgered Kapur to get Rahman to score Hollywood movies. Antonio Pinto was mentioned as being a collaborator during production, but later Armstrong joined the project. In January 2009, he expressed regret that other compositions from A. R. Rahman were not used in the film, feeling that "the score of Golden Age was not half as good as it could have been." He expressed hope to hear these pieces appear in another project.

"Opening" from the score was used in the BBC's coverage of the Single's Finals at the 2008 Wimbledon Championships. "Storm" is heard in a trailer of the 2013 film Man of Steel.

=== Track listing ===
No.	Title	Composer(s)	Length
1.	"Opening"	A. R. Rahman	1:31
2.	"Philip"	A. R. Rahman; Craig Armstrong	1:51
3.	"Now You Grow Dull"	A. R. Rahman	0:57
4.	"Horseriding"	A. R. Rahman	1:38
5.	"Immensities"	A. R. Rahman; Craig Armstrong	2:41
6.	"Bess and Raleigh Dance"	A. R. Rahman	2:34
7.	"Mary's Beheading"	A. R. Rahman; Craig Armstrong	3:22
8.	"End Puddle / Possible Suitors"	A. R. Rahman; Craig Armstrong	2:06
9.	"War / Realisation"	A. R. Rahman; Craig Armstrong	2:57
10.	"Destiny Theme"	A. R. Rahman; Craig Armstrong	2:31
11.	"Smile Lines"	A. R. Rahman; Craig Armstrong	1:15
12.	"Bess to See Throckmorton"	A. R. Rahman; Craig Armstrong	1:03
13.	"Dr Dee Part 1"	A. R. Rahman	3:18
14.	"Horseback Address"	A. R. Rahman; Craig Armstrong	2:26
15.	"Battle"	A. R. Rahman	3:29
16.	"Love Theme"	A. R. Rahman; Craig Armstrong	2:51
17.	"Divinity Theme"	A. R. Rahman	5:08
18.	"Storm"	A. R. Rahman	3:00
19.	"Walsingham Death Bed"	A. R. Rahman; Craig Armstrong	1:51
20.	"Closing"	A. R. Rahman; Craig Armstrong	2:00
Total length:			48:10

== Home media ==
The film was released on DVD and HD DVD on 5 February 2008, and on Blu-ray on 27 April 2010.

== Reception ==
=== Critical reception ===
Although Cate Blanchett's performance was highly praised, the film received generally mixed to negative reviews from US critics. On the review aggregator Rotten Tomatoes, 34% of critics gave the film a positive rating, based on 163 reviews; the average rating is 5.1/10. The critics consensus reads, "This sequel is full of lavish costumes and elaborate sets, but lacks the heart and creativity of the original Elizabeth." On Metacritic, the film has an average score of 45 out of 100, based on 35 reviews, indicating "mixed or average reviews". Audiences polled by CinemaScore gave the film an average grade of "B" on an A+ to F scale, the same grade as its predecessor.

Roger Ebert gave the film 2 1/2 stars out of 4, saying 'there are scenes where the costumes are so sumptuous, the sets so vast, the music so insistent, that we lose sight of the humans behind the dazzle of the production'. Ebert did, however, praise many of the actors' performances, particularly that of Cate Blanchett as Queen Elizabeth I. He said 'that Blanchett could appear in the same Toronto International Film Festival playing Elizabeth and Bob Dylan, both splendidly, is a wonder of acting'. Blanchett portrayed Bob Dylan in the film I'm Not There and was nominated for an Academy Award for her roles in both movies.

Colin Covert of the Minneapolis Star Tribune gave the film 3 stars out of 4, writing '... as a pseudo-historical fable, a romantic triangle and a blood-and-thunder melodrama, the film can't be faulted' and 'This isn't historical fabrication, it's mutilation. But for all its lapses, this is probably the liveliest, most vibrant Elizabethan production since Baz Luhrmann's Romeo + Juliet.' while Wesley Morris of The Boston Globe said, "Historians might demand a little more history from Elizabeth: The Golden Age. But soap opera loyalists could hardly ask for more soap."

Michael Gove, speaking on BBC Two's Newsnight Review, said: 'It tells the story of England's past in a way which someone who's familiar with the Whig tradition of history would find, as I did, completely sympathetic. It's amazing to see a film made now that is so patriotic ... One of the striking things about this film is that it's almost a historical anomaly. I can't think of a historical period film in which England and the English have been depicted heroically for the last forty or fifty years. You almost have to go back to Laurence Olivier's Shakespeare's Henry V in which you actually have an English king and English armies portrayed heroically'.

=== Box office ===
Elizabeth: The Golden Age grossed $6.1 million in 2,001 theatres during its opening weekend in the United States and Canada, ranking #6 at the box office. In the United Kingdom and Republic of Ireland the film entered at No. 4 and earned £1.3 million ($2.7 million) on its opening weekend. As of February 2009 the worldwide total was $74.2 million, including $16.4 million in the US and Canada and $57.8 million elsewhere. In contrast, the film's predecessor, Elizabeth, grossed $30 million in the United States and Canada, and a total of $82.1 million worldwide.

== Awards and nominations ==
The film received two Academy Award nominations, winning the Academy Award for Costume Design for Alexandra Byrne. Cate Blanchett was also nominated for the Academy Award for Best Actress for her performance in the film, becoming the first female actor to receive two Academy Award nominations for playing the same role.

Award	Category	Recipient(s)	Result
Academy Awards	Best Actress	Cate Blanchett	Nominated
Academy Awards	Best Costume Design	Alexandra Byrne	Won
Art Directors Guild Awards	Excellence in Production Design for a Period Film	Guy Hendrix Dyas	Nominated
Australian Film Institute Awards	Best International Actress	Cate Blanchett	Won
British Academy Film Awards	Best Actress in a Leading Role	Cate Blanchett	Nominated
British Academy Film Awards	Best Costume Design	Alexandra Byrne	Nominated
British Academy Film Awards	Best Makeup and Hair	Jenny Shircore	Nominated
British Academy Film Awards	Best Production Design	Guy Hendrix Dyas and Richard Roberts	Nominated
British Society of Cinematographers	Best Cinematography in a Theatrical Feature Film	Remi Adefarasin	Nominated
Critics' Choice Movie Awards	Best Actress	Cate Blanchett	Nominated
Costume Designers Guild Awards	Excellence in Period Film	Alexandra Byrne	Nominated
Empire Awards	Best Actress	Cate Blanchett	Nominated
Golden Globe Awards	Best Actress in a Motion Picture – Drama	Cate Blanchett	Nominated
Irish Film & Television Awards	Best International Actress	Cate Blanchett	Nominated
Satellite Awards	Best Art Direction and Production Design	Guy Hendrix Dyas and David Allday	Won
Satellite Awards	Best Costume Design	Alexandra Byrne	Won
Screen Actors Guild Awards	Outstanding Performance by a Female Actor in a Leading Role	Cate Blanchett	Nominated

At the 11th Pyongyang International Film Festival held in September 2008, one of the awards for special screening were conferred upon the film.

== See also ==
- Anti-Catholicism in the United Kingdom
- Black legend
- Cultural depictions of Elizabeth I
- Cultural depictions of Philip II of Spain
- Spanish Armada
