= Ruth Myers (costume designer) =

British costume designer (born 1940)

- Born: 1940 (age 85–86); Manchester, England
- Occupation: Costume designer
- Years active: 1967–present
- Spouse: Richard Macdonald (died 1993)

Ruth Myers (born 1940) is a British costume designer. She has received various accolades, including two Costume Designers Guild Awards and an Emmy Award, in addition to nominations for two Academy Awards and two BAFTA Awards. She was honored with the Costume Designers Guild Career Achievement Award in 2008.

== Career ==
Myers was born and grew up in Manchester, England and attended the St. Martin's School of Art in London. Early in her career, she sewed sequins for Anthony Powell while also working as an assistant to Sophie Harris (costume designer for classic English films). Myers then turned to theatre and low-budget films such as the 1967 comedy Smashing Time. Upon being persuaded by Gene Wilder, Myers moved to the U.S. and worked with him on the films The World's Greatest Lover, The Woman in Red, and Haunted Honeymoon.

Myers was the costume designer on the film The Russia House, notable for the costumes and splendid clothing worn by Roy Scheider.

Myers acted as costume designer for the 2002 film The Four Feathers, the 2006 film Monster House and the 2008 film City of Ember (which were both directed by Gil Kenan). She worked with Kevin Spacey in the films L.A. Confidential and Beyond the Sea. For the latter production, she used textiles from the 1950s and 1960s and ultimately designed 65 outfit changes for Spacey that appear in the film. The actor, who portrayed singer Bobby Darin, had to wear a wide range of costumes as a reflection of his life's journey, from bright suits to his signature red sweater.

In 2008, Myers received the Career Achievement Award at the Costume Designers Guild Awards. In 2011 she designed the costumes for the supernatural teen drama film Vampire Academy. The following year, Myers oversaw costume design for the television miniseries Hemingway & Gellhorn. Myers' efforts earned her a nomination in the outstanding made-for-television movie or miniseries category at the Costume Designers Guild Awards.

Ruth Myers is the proprietor of Ruth Myers Costume Design.

== Filmography ==
=== Film ===
Year	Title	Director	Notes
1967	Smashing Time	Desmond Davis	
1968	Work Is a Four-Letter Word	Peter Hall	
1968	Isadora	Karel Reisz	
1969	Three into Two Won't Go	Peter Hall	
1970	The Twelve Chairs	Mel Brooks	
1971	All the Right Noises	Gerry O'Hara	
1971	Romance of a Horsethief	Abraham Polonsky	
1972	The Ruling Class	Peter Medak	
1973	A Touch of Class	Melvin Frank	
1974	Little Malcolm	Stuart Cooper	
1974	Stardust	Michael Apted	
1974	Ghost in the Noonday Sun	Peter Medak	
1975	Galileo	Joseph Losey	
1975	The Romantic Englishwoman	Joseph Losey	
1975	The Adventure of Sherlock Holmes' Smarter Brother	Gene Wilder	
1977	Silver Bears	Ivan Passer	
1977	The World's Greatest Lover	Gene Wilder	
1978	Magic	Richard Attenborough	
1979	The Main Event	Howard Zieff	
1979	...And Justice for All	Norman Jewison	
1980	It's My Turn	Claudia Weill	
1980	In God We Trust	Marty Feldman	
1980	The Competition	Joel Oliansky	
1980	Altered States	Ken Russell	
1981	First Monday in October	Ronald Neame	
1982	Cannery Row	David S. Ward	
1983	Something Wicked This Way Comes	Jack Clayton	
1984	Electric Dreams	Steve Barron	
1984	The Woman in Red	Gene Wilder	
1984	Teachers	Arthur Hiller	
1985	Plenty	Fred Schepisi	
1986	Haunted Honeymoon	Gene Wilder	
1988	Vibes	Ken Kwapis	
1988	The Accidental Tourist	Lawrence Kasdan	
1989	Blood Red	Peter Masterson	
1989	Blaze	Ron Shelton	
1990	The Russia House	Fred Schepisi	
1991	The Marrying Man	Jerry Rees	
1991	Another You	Maurice Phillips	
1991	The Addams Family	Barry Sonnenfeld	
1992	Mr. Saturday Night	Billy Crystal	
1993	The Firm	Sydney Pollack	
1994	Clean Slate	Mick Jackson	
1994	Pontiac Moon	Peter Medak	
1994	I.Q.	Fred Schepisi	
1995	How to Make an American Quilt	Jocelyn Moorhouse	
1996	Emma	Douglas McGrath	
1996	Bogus	Norman Jewison	
1997	L.A. Confidential	Curtis Hanson	
1997	A Thousand Acres	Jocelyn Moorhouse	
1998	Deep Impact	Mimi Leder	
1999	Cradle Will Rock	Tim Robbins	
2000	The Next Best Thing	John Schlesinger	
2000	Company Man	Peter Askin; Douglas McGrath	
2000	Center Stage	Nicholas Hytner	
2000	Proof of Life	Taylor Hackford	
2001	Iris	Richard Eyre	
2002	The Four Feathers	Shekhar Kapur	
2002	Nicholas Nickleby	Douglas McGrath	
2004	Ella Enchanted	Tommy O'Haver	
2004	Connie and Carla	Michael Lembeck	
2004	Beyond the Sea	Kevin Spacey	
2006	Half Light	Craig Rosenberg	
2006	Monster House	Gil Kenan	
2006	Infamous	Douglas McGrath	
2006	The Painted Veil	John Curran	
2007	The Golden Compass	Chris Weitz	
2008	City of Ember	Gil Kenan	
2009	Dorian Gray	Oliver Parker	
2010	Cemetery Junction	Ricky Gervais; Stephen Merchant	
2011	Unknown	Jaume Collet-Serra	
2011	The Deep Blue Sea	Terence Davies	
2014	Vampire Academy	Mark Waters	
2014	Effie Gray	Richard Laxton	
2015	Mortdecai	David Koepp	
2015	Molly Moon and the Incredible Book of Hypnotism	Christopher N. Rowley	
2016	The Legend of Tarzan	David Yates	
2018	Mute	Duncan Jones	
2019	The Red Sea Diving Resort	Gideon Raff	
2019	Scary Stories to Tell in the Dark	André Øvredal	
2021	A Boy Called Christmas	Gil Kenan	
2024	Ghostbusters: Frozen Empire	Gil Kenan	with Alexis Forte

=== Television ===
Year	Title	Notes
1974	Bram Stoker's Dracula	Television film
1988	Baja Oklahoma	Television film
2003	Carnivàle	Episode: "Milfay"
2006	Big Love	Episode: "Pilot"
2012	Hemingway & Gellhorn	Television film

== Awards and nominations ==
Major associations

Academy Awards

Year	Category	Nominated work	Result	Ref.
1992	Best Costume Design	The Addams Family	Nominated	
1997	Best Costume Design	Emma	Nominated	

BAFTA Awards

Year	Category	Nominated work	Result	Ref.
British Academy Film Awards
1970	Best Costume Design	Isadora	Nominated	
1998	Best Costume Design	L.A. Confidential	Nominated	

Emmy Awards

Year	Category	Nominated work	Result	Ref.
Primetime Emmy Awards
2004	Outstanding Costumes for a Series	Carnivàle (Episode: "Milfay")	Won	
2012	Outstanding Costumes for a Miniseries, Movie, or Special	Hemingway & Gellhorn	Nominated	

Miscellaneous awards

List of Ruth Myers other awards and nominations
Award	Year (Note: Indicates the year of ceremony. Each year is linked to the article about the awards held that year, wherever possible.)	Category	Title	Result	Ref.
CableACE Awards	1989	Costume Design for a Dramatic or Theatrical Special/Movie or Miniseries	Baja Oklahoma	Won	
Costume Designers Guild Awards	2004	Excellence in Period/Fantasy Television Series	Carnivàle (Episode: "Milfay")	Won (Note: Myers was awarded for the pilot episode while Terry Dresbach won for the series.)	
Costume Designers Guild Awards	2008	Excellence in Fantasy Film	The Golden Compass	Won	
Costume Designers Guild Awards	2008	Career Achievement Award	—N/a	Honored	
Costume Designers Guild Awards	2013	Outstanding Made for Television Movie or Miniseries	Hemingway & Gellhorn	Nominated	
Satellite Awards	2008	Best Costume Design	City of Ember	Nominated	
Saturn Awards	1984	Best Costume Design	Something Wicked This Way Comes	Nominated	
Saturn Awards	2008	Best Costume Design	The Golden Compass	Nominated	
Saturn Awards	2025	Best Costume Design	Ghostbusters: Frozen Empire	Nominated	
