= Eddie Mills =

American actor (born 1968)

- Born: December 30, 1972 (age 53); Kannapolis, North Carolina
- Occupations: Film, television actor

Eddie Mills (born December 30, 1968) is an American actor. He played Vandy in the TV drama Wasteland.

== Filmography ==
Film
Year	Film	Role	Notes
1998	Heartwood	Frank Burris	
1998	Dancer, Texas Pop. 81	John Hemphill	
1999	Splendor Falls	Unknown	
2003	The Trade	Wayne Garret	
2003	Artworks	Cory Wells	
2003	Winter Break	Carter Boyd	
2005	Wannabe	Peter Yates	
2007	The Happiest Day of His Life	Dave, Mistered of Honor	
Television
Year	Title	Role	Notes
1994	Full House	Arthur	Episode: "A Date with Fate"
1994	XXX's & OOO's	Sonny Randall	TV movie
1996	Sliders	D.E.R.I.C.	Episode: "State of the A.R.T."
1997	Born Into Exile	Ted Nolan	TV movie
1998	Ally McBeal	Clinton Gil	Episode: "Cro-Magnon"
1998	Clueless	David	Episodes: "In Boyfriend We Trust" and "Dance Fever"
1998	Push	Scott Trysfan	5 episodes
1998	Sabrina Goes to Rome	Paul	TV movie
1998	The Tempest	Captain Frederick Allen	TV movie
1999	Dawson's Creek	Tyson "Ty" Hicks	4 episodes
1999	Wasteland	Vandy	13 episodes
2000	At Any Cost	Lance	TV movie
2002	Touched by an Angel	Joshua Wren	Episode: "The Christmas Watch"
2004	Dead Like Me	Kyle Lowerdeck	Episode: "Rites of Passage"
2005	Mystery Woman: Game Time	Bradley Stillman	TV movie
2006	Crossing Jordan	Sheriff Davey Correll	Episode: "Loves Me Not"
2006	House M.D.	Bob Palko	Episode: "Clueless"
2007	Without a Trace	Bob Gilchrist	Episode: "Skin Deep"
2009	CSI: NY	Phillip Langdon	Episode: "Prey"
2015	Devious Maids	Louie Becker	3 episodes
2025	Matlock	Rob Davis	Season 2 Episode 6: "Harm Reduction"
