= Dancer, Texas Pop. 81 =

- Promotional poster
- Directed by: Tim McCanlies
- Written by: Tim McCanlies
- Produced by: Dana Shaffer; Peter White; Chase Foster
- Starring: Breckin Meyer; Peter Facinelli; Ethan Embry; Eddie Mills
- Cinematography: Andrew Dintenfass
- Edited by: Rob Kobrin
- Music by: Steve Dorff
- Distributed by: TriStar Pictures
- Release dates: March 13, 1998 (SXSW); May 1, 1998 (United States)
- Running time: 97 minutes
- Country: United States
- Language: English
- Box office: $676,631

Dancer, Texas Pop. 81 is a 1998 comedy-drama film starring Breckin Meyer, Peter Facinelli, Eddie Mills, and Ethan Embry. The film is set in the small, fictional Texas town of Dancer, with the titular reference to a population of 81 residents.

== Plot summary ==
In the small West Texas hamlet of Dancer, four friends (Keller, Terrell, John, and Squirrel) have just graduated high school and are weighing the decision to leave for Los Angeles. The young men made a pact to leave long ago, but their families and friends won't let them go without a fight. The well-off Terrell wants to escape the controlling influence of his mother, who insists he stay in town to work in the family oil business. John's family wants him to stay on the ranch and study agriculture at a nearby university. The awkward Squirrel lives in a decrepit trailer with his drunken, occasionally absentee father, whose survival depends on Squirrel. Unlike his friends, Keller has no major battle to fight over leaving; he lives with his widowed grandfather, who encourages Keller to leave for greener pastures. The four young men struggle to try to reconcile their family ties, obligations, and familiarity with home with their dreams of big city life.

== Cast ==
- Breckin Meyer as Keller Coleman
- Peter Facinelli as Terrell Lee Lusk
- Eddie Mills as John Hemphill
- Ethan Embry as "Squirrel"
- Ashley Johnson as Josie Hemphill
- Patricia Wettig as Mrs. Lusk
- Michael O'Neill as Mr. Lusk
- Eddie Jones as Earl
- Wayne Tippit as Keller's Grandfather
- Alexandra Holden as Vivian
- Keith Szarabajka as Squirrel's Father
- Shawn Weatherly as Sue Ann
- Michael Crabtree as Mr. Hemphill
- Lashawn McIvor as Mrs. Hemphill

== Production ==
The movie was filmed in Fort Davis, Texas. It was shot in 25 days.

== Reception ==
On the review aggregator website Rotten Tomatoes, 80% of 15 critics' reviews are positive, with an average rating of 6.6/10.

Hollis Chacona of The Austin Chronicle gave a positive review, praising the cast, writing, and cinematography. Chacona wrote, "There are so many captivating characters, so many funny moments, and so much sweet affection in this movie, its ending comes as a sorrowful leave-taking. You're tempted to wave goodbye to it (if you have a hankie to wave, so much the better) and linger in your seat long after the lights have come up." The film reviewer Joe M. O'Connell, writing for the San Antonio Express-News, called the film "the finest representation of small-town Texas since The Last Picture Show".

Spirituality & Practice called it "a spiffy valentine to small-town America that evidences a wholesome attitude toward community", adding "This laid-back drama ambles around its peripheral themes of coming-of-age and friendship." Emanuel Levy of Variety also gave a positive review, writing: "Perhaps not since the eccentric early comedies of Jonathan Demme (Citizens Band, a.k.a. Handle With Care; and Melvin and Howard) has there been an American comedy that captures the unique texture of small-town life without condescending to its characters. A product of such a milieu, director McCanlies understands that a nonjudgmental approach is key to such a story's success; in that spirit, he highlights, rather than conceals, the idiosyncratic personalities, dialect and humor of his dozen or so characters."
