= The Tempest (1998 film) =

1998 American drama TV film

- Based on: The Tempest by William Shakespeare
- Directed by: Jack Bender
- Starring: Peter Fonda
- Music by: Terence Blanchard
- Country of origin: United States
- Original language: English

Production
- Executive producers: Jack Bender; Bonnie Raskin
- Producer: James Bigwood
- Cinematography: Steve Shaw
- Editor: Stephen Lovejoy
- Running time: 85 minutes
- Production companies: Bonnie Raskin Productions; NBC Studios

Original release
- Release: December 13, 1998

The Tempest is a 1998 American drama television film directed by Jack Bender. It is a modernized adaptation of the William Shakespeare play The Tempest set in Mississippi during the American Civil War starring Peter Fonda as Gideon Prosper, a character based on Shakespeare's Prospero.

== Plot ==
Gideon Prosper, a Southern slaveowner, is forced off his plantation by his younger brother Anthony before the American Civil War's outbreak. Surviving in the Mississippi bayou, Prosper uses magic that he learned from one of his slaves to protect his teenage daughter and to assist the Union.

== Cast ==
- Peter Fonda as Gideon Prosper
- John Glover as Anthony Prosper
- Harold Perrineau as Ariel
- Katherine Heigl as Miranda Prosper
- John Pyper-Ferguson as Gator Man
- Eddie Mills as Captain Frederick Allen
- Dennis Redfield as Wilfried "Willy" Gonzo
- Donzaleigh Abernathy as Mambo Azaleigh
- Jon Huffman as General Grant
- Tom Nowicki as General Sherman
- Rhoda Griffis as Sophie Dupree
- Lonnie Hamilton as Old Ariel
- Rachel Crouch as Young Miranda
- Alex Van as Lead Raider
- Tim Parati as Raider
- Charles Lawlor as General Pemberton
- David Dwyer as Sheriff
- Rob Treveiler as Union Sentry
- Roby Pettit as Picket #2
- Maxwell Bruce as Bluecoat
- Bill Gribble as Scout
- James Bigwood as Lieutenant
- Steve Coulter as Lewis
- Ethan Jensen as Picket
- Dallas Miller as Field Slave
- Don Shanks as Overseer
- Gary Dow as Grant's Sergeant Major
- Rick Lundin as Possee Member
- Adrienne Reynolds as Delia
- John Laporte as Surgeon
- Patricia Buckley-Moss as Dancer
- Mark Miller as Union Soldier
- Diedra Orhant (stand-in for Katherine Heigl)
- Johnny W. Wilbans as 2nd Union Sentry

== Production ==
Filming took place at Cypress Gardens, and other locations in, and around, Charleston, South Carolina.

== Broadcast ==
The film was broadcast on NBC at 9:00 p.m. Eastern Time on Sunday, December 13, 1998.

== Reception ==
In his 2001 book Shakespeare in the Movies: From the Silent Era to Today, author Douglas Brode wrote, "Jack Bender's film emerged as yet another offbeat variation on Will's theme, but with the Bard's immortal poetry entirely excised."

In a negative review for the Los Angeles Times, reviewer Daryl H. Miller wrote, "A miscalculation of epic proportions, this revision of one of the Bard's masterworks is at times laugh-out-loud awful, at times offensive."

In a negative review for People, reviewer Terry Kelleher wrote, "The low-key style that served Fonda so well in his Oscar-nominated Ulee's Gold role doesn't work for Prosper/Prospero, who needs a charisma that the actor can't provide. The script gives Fonda two lines of actual Shakespeare at the end, and we admit he seems less than comfortable with the language."

In a review for Variety, reviewer Laura Fries wrote, "What makes this production universally appealing is that it lacks the pretenses that usually come with a literary-based telepic. Writer James Henerson plays on such '90s issues as lost faith, selfishness, vengeance and loyalty to propel this Civil War-era saga."

== See also ==
- List of William Shakespeare film adaptations
