= Robert Blackman =

American costume designer

Robert Richard Blackman
- Born: 1943 (age 82–83)
- Occupation: Costume designer
- Known for: Star Trek franchise
- Notable work: Star Trek: The Next Generation, Star Trek: Deep Space Nine, Star Trek: Voyager, Star Trek: Enterprise, Star Trek Generations, Star Trek: First Contact, Pushing Daisies
- Awards: 2 Emmy Awards (Star Trek: The Next Generation), 1 Emmy Award (Pushing Daisies), Career Achievement Award from Costume Designers Guild

Robert Richard Blackman (born 1943) is an American costume designer most known for his work on the Star Trek franchise since Star Trek: The Next Generation's season three opener, "Evolution" and Star Trek: Deep Space Nine.

== Star Trek ==
Blackman had been working on the sitcom Day by Day, which was being filmed on the Paramount lot. He met Bob Harris in the wardrobe department, who was looking for people to interview to replace Durinda Rice Wood on Star Trek: The Next Generation. Harris wanted Blackman to interview for the post, but he refused, saying that he wasn't interested in working on a futuristic project. Two days later, he agreed to attend an interview after Harris begged him.

Blackman later recalled that he took the interview with David Livingston very casually, saying "but by the time the interview was over I had my feet propped up on his desk and I was just gabbing about theory and design and stuff". He was offered the post, and agreed to take it for a year. He became head of costume design for all Star Trek series, working on Star Trek: Deep Space Nine, Star Trek: Voyager, Star Trek: Enterprise and the feature films Star Trek Generations and Star Trek: First Contact.

== Awards ==
He has received 10 Emmy nominations for his work on Star Trek, winning twice for The Next Generation's episodes "Cost of Living" and "Time's Arrow, Part II". He also won an Emmy in 2009 for his work on the Pushing Daisies episode "Bzzzzzzzzz!". In 2006, he was awarded with a Career Achievement Award from the Costume Designers Guild, and their Spotlight Award.
