= Caroline Harris (costume designer) =

British costume designer

Caroline Harris is a British costume designer for film and television. In 1999, she was nominated for a BAFTA for Best Costume for An Ideal Husband (dir. Oliver Parker). In 2004, Caroline Harris was nominated for an Emmy Award for Outstanding Costume for her work on Iron Jawed Angels on HBO. Other noted credits include Mr Nice (2010), TV trilogy Red Riding (2009) and Legend (2015).

== Costume design career ==
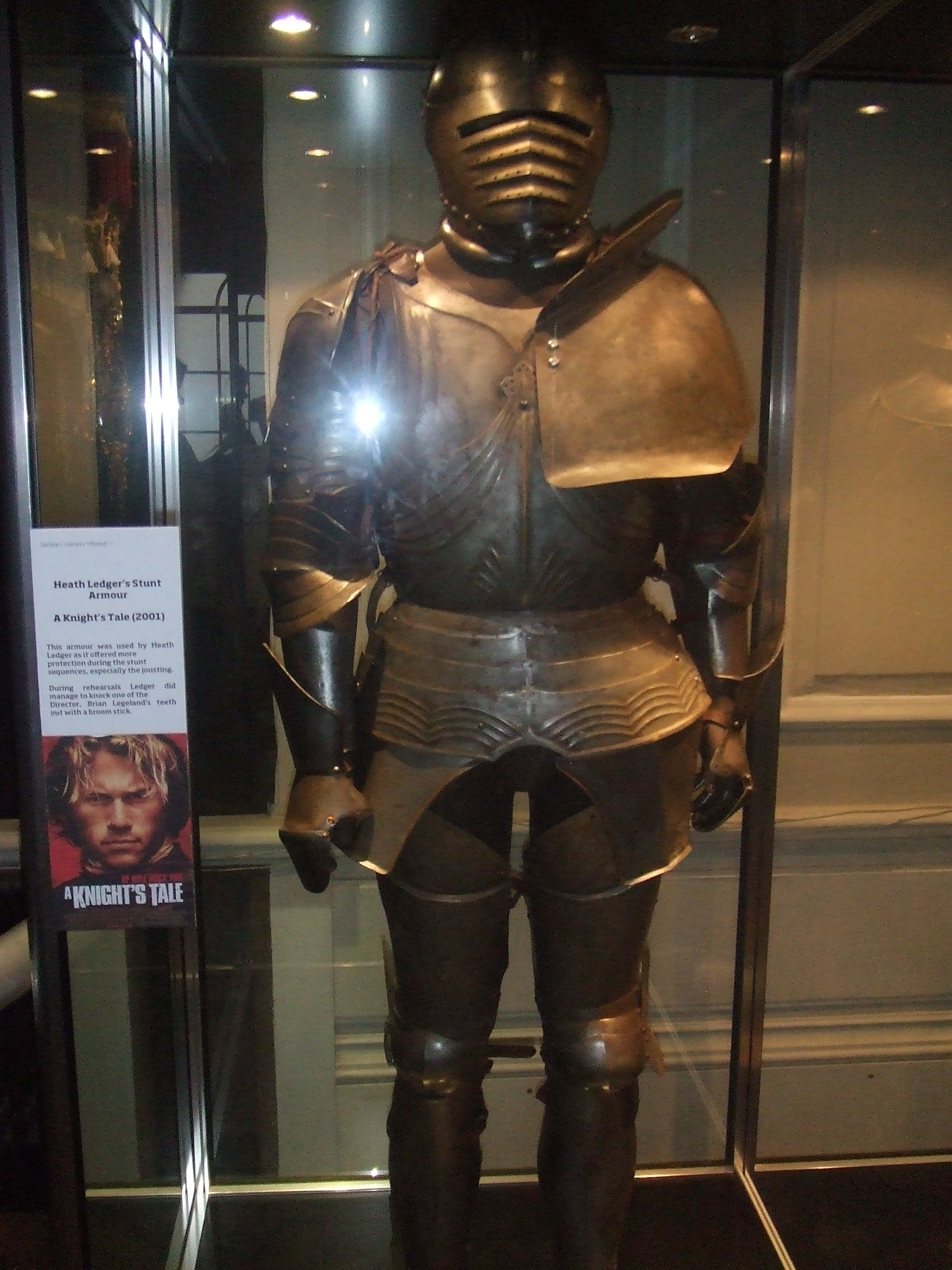
Suit of armour from A Knight's Tale, designed by Caroline Harris.

Caroline Harris is credited as Costume Designer on over forty feature films and TV movies. Generally, she has specialised in period films, though her costume designs have often brought a contemporary perspective in order to connect with modern audiences. Interviewed by BAFTA in 2014, Harris said that she 'never really intended to be a costume designer', but by focussing on 'what I was good at', and following her interest in textiles, she found her way into the profession. She taught herself to make clothes by deconstructing existing garments, and sold hand-painted T-shirts. Early in her career, working on low-budget films, Harris says she was often a 'one-person department', attempting to do everything alone; but she recognises that this gave her varied experiences, and she notes that successful costume designers need intense stamina and drive. Describing how she works with actors, Harris said 'actors always have plenty of input. Just by their very presence, they just exude input even when they're not articulating it'.

Several of Harris's film projects have gained critical and academic attention:

Harris designed the costumes for Swept from the Sea (1997), an adaptation of Joseph Conrad's short story Amy Foster. To demonstrate the main character's isolation from others, and her connection to the sea, Harris intentionally incorporated 'fisherman's oilskins into costumes such as Amy's coat and skirts' and added 'shiny panels into her best dress to indicate that she is a keeper of found objects'. These design choices visually signified Amy's unique character in the story, her 'proud isolation' differentiating her from the other townspeople.

An Ideal Husband (1999) was set in the late-1800s and based upon Oscar Wilde's 1895 play of the same name. Harris's period costumes - described as 'fabulous' by recent critics - were nominated for a BAFTA Best Costume Design award, and a Satellite Award for Best Costume Design. Costumes singled out for critical praise include a gold lamé gown worn by Julienne Moore as Mrs Cheveley, which featured an off-the-shoulder neckline and translucent layered balloon sleeves, and in contrast, a high-necked outfit with 'divided skirt' - resembling culottes - worn by Cate Blanchett as Lady Chiltern. Costume historian Sandy Schreier has identified a detail of Rupert Everett's costume intended as an 'homage to Oscar Wilde': a green carnation in his button hole, which Wilde and his circle wore to signal their homosexuality.

A Knight's Tale (2001, dir. Brian Helgeland) was a Medieval romp set during a jousting tournament. Harris's costume designs are based loosely in the Medieval era, but offer playful interpretations and references to Y2K fashion styling and contemporary sportswear - especially in the clothing of the romantic leads and Heath Ledger's armour. On the DVD extras, Harris says that period costume 'should be exciting and it should be sexy, and, I mean, the period itself: I'm sure it was exciting and sexy.' Brian Helgeland credited Harris with 'a lot of the conceits and notions to make the armor work towards all the sports analogies', though this departure from historical accuracy has been criticised by historian Carl Grindley, who commented, 'Harris herself seems more interested in the physical charms of the leads than she does in any sense of fidelity to the material.'

Harris worked again with Brian Helgeland on supernatural thriller The Order (2003) and sport film 42 (2013). Harris described this baseball move, set in 1942, as 'daunting' since she initially did not know much about the sport.

Caroline Harris's fourth collaboration with director Brian Helgeland was Legend (2015), a historical drama set in early 1960s London telling the story of Ronnie and Reggie Kray. Throughout eight or nine weeks prep time, she sourced many vintage items to dress supporting characters, including original Hardy Amies suits for Christopher Eccleston. Harris designed the twins' suits to be made from scratch, drawing on Italian style influences popular at the time and copying details from vintage garments, but made using traditional English wools. Both twins were played by Tom Hardy, so to tell them apart, Harris dressed Reg in single-breasted jackets, and Ron in three-piece suits with double-breasted jackets. This also gave Ron added 'bulk', and avoided the need for extra padding. Explaining why she chose not to hire much costume, Harris commented 'I like to buy as much as I can so I'm free to do what I want with it all'.
