= April Ferry =

American costume designer (1932–2024)

- Born: April Cecilia Gaskins; October 31, 1932; North Carolina, U.S.
- Died: January 11, 2024 (aged 91)
- Occupation: Costume designer
- Years active: 1979–2016
- Spouse: Stephen Robertson Ferry (19?? - January 22, 1968; divorced)
- Children: 3

April Ferry (born April Cecilia Gaskins; October 31, 1932 – January 11, 2024) was an American costume designer. She was nominated at the 67th Academy Awards for the film Maverick in the category of Best Costume Design.

Ferry won an Emmy Award for the costumes in the TV show Rome. She was also nominated for an Emmy in 1989 for the Hallmark movie My Name Is Bill W. In 2014, she received the Career Achievement Award at the Costume Designers Guild Awards.

In 2016, starting with season 6 of HBO's epic fantasy series Game of Thrones, she took over Michele Clapton's duties as the new costume designer for a majority of the season. Clapton eventually returned to the show as costume designer for the seventh season.

== Death ==
Ferry died on January 11, 2024, at the age of 91.

== Selected filmography ==
- Mohenjo Daro (2016)
- Game of Thrones (2016)
- Jurassic World (2015)
- Robocop (2014)
- Elysium (2013)
- The Box (2009)
- Southland Tales (2006)
- Terminator 3: Rise of the Machines (2003)
- Donnie Darko (2001)
- U-571 (2000)
- Don King: Only in America (1997)
- Flubber (1997)
- Shadow Conspiracy (1997)
- Maverick (1994)
- Little Giants (1994)
- Beethoven's 2nd (1993)
- Free Willy (1993)
- The Babe (1992)
- Radio Flyer (1992)
- Almost an Angel (1990)
- Leviathan (1989)
- Three Fugitives (1989)
- Made in Heaven (1988)
- Planes, Trains & Automobiles (1987)
- Big Trouble in Little China (1986)
- Mask (1985)
- The Jerk (1979)
