= Katherine Jane Bryant =

American costume designer

Janie Bryant
- Born: Katherine Jane Bryant; October 16, 1974 (age 52); Cleveland, Tennessee
- Education: Cleveland High School; Brenau Academy; Georgia State University
- Occupation: costume designer
- Parents: Paul E Bryant II (father); Dorothea Bryant (mother)
- Relatives: siblings: Laura Bryant Paul E Bryant III
- Awards: Emmy Award

Katherine Jane Bryant, known professionally as Janie Bryant, is an American television costume designer. Her two most notable works are the HBO Western series Deadwood, for which she was awarded the Emmy Award for Outstanding Costumes for a Series in 2005 and Mad Men, for which she designed from 2007 until its end in 2015.

== Family and childhood ==
Bryant was born on October 16, 1974, in Cleveland, Tennessee. She was born to Dorothea Bryant (mother) and Paul E Bryant II (father). Bryant’s mother studied art before becoming a schoolteacher and then pursuing a career as a realtor. She is now happily retired. Throughout Bryant’s childhood, her father ran a business called ‘Bryant Yarns’. He has since died. It has been said that her mother inspired Bryant’s creativity, and that her father taught her how to successfully navigate the professional world.

She grew up with three siblings: an older sister and brother (Laura Bryant and Paul E Bryant III) as well as a younger sister (Anna Bryant). While growing up, Bryant was most interested in playing dress-up (while creating different characters through costume), singing, dancing (ballet), and designing clothes for her dolls. Bryant designed her first dress when she was 8 years old. It was a sundress with blue and white stripes, a criss-cross strap in the back, and white anchor buttons in the front. She wore it to her third grade class, but none of her classmates believed her when she told them she had made it. From an early age Bryant became obsessed with old movies, such as Gone with the Wind, The Sound of Music, The Ten Commandments, and The Wizard of Oz. She claims that much of her inspiration throughout her career has stemmed from this obsession for old films. She also enjoyed television shows such as The Partridge Family, The Brady Bunch, Father Knows Best, My Three Sons, Bewitched, and Get Smart. Bryant was divorced in 2016 and lives in Los Angeles.

== High school and college education ==
Bryant attended Cleveland High School for two years before transferring to Brenau Academy for the rest of her high school education. Brenau Academy is a grades 9-12 college preparatory school, dedicated to preparing young women for a college education. Brenau maintained an all female student body until 2012. Throughout high school she maintained a strong focus on art, painting, and illustration, and believed she was going to pursue a career as an artist or a businesswoman. Unsure of what she wanted to do with her life, and feeling pressure from her family to pursue a career in business, she attended college of Charleston for a summer before transferring to her high school’s all women college, Brenau University. She attended Brenau for a year before transferring to Georgia State University for another year, and then transferred once again (without her parents' knowledge) to the America college of Applied Arts. She finished her college education here while studying fashion design.

== Career ==
After finishing college, she moved to Paris and then to New York, where she learned the craft from designer John Scher. After meeting a costume designer at a party, Bryant found her calling and began to work on movies and commercials in Manhattan. After some independent work, including a Nick at Nite commercial, Bryant's career grew through work with the David Milch series Big Apple, which led to work on his Deadwood series that ran on HBO. It was her work with Deadwood that later led to an interview for Mad Men with the series creator Matthew Weiner. She has been nominated for four Emmys for her costume design on Mad Men.

Mad Men-inspired collections popped up all over runways in 2008 and designers including Michael Kors, Prada and Vera Wang have cited Bryant or the shows on which she worked as key influences. She is credited with a huge role in bringing vintage (and vintage-inspired) pieces to contemporary clothing. Her work on Mad Men has also led to partnerships with Brooks Brothers (a limited-edition Mad Men suit) and Banana Republic's Back to Work line.

For Bryant's own influences she relies not only on other designers, with whom she has worked and done research into the periods, but also real life people who she sees in the characters. For example, Grace Kelly in Betty Draper. Among the key elements essential to recreating the 1960s look in the show's cast are foundation garments, which then led to a partnership with Maidenform.

== Filmography ==
Costume designer

- Deadwood: The Movie (2019)
- The Romanoffs (2018)
- It (2017)
- The Last Tycoon (2017)
- Telenovela (2015)
- The Last House on the Left (2009)
- Mad Men (2007–2015)
- John from Cincinnati (2007)
- The Hills Have Eyes II (2007)
- Deadwood (2004–2006)
- Alien Hunter (2003)
- Sniper 2 (2002)
- Hack (2002)
- Big Apple (2001)
- The Big Kahuna (1999)
- Simply Irresistible (1999)
- Dead Broke (1999)
- Scar City (1998)
- Bad Manners (1997)
- Mr. Jealousy (1997)
- Under the Bridge (1997)
- Grind (1997)
- Highball (1997)
- Ripe (1996)
- Palookaville (1995)
- Blessing (1994)
