= Chrisi Karvonides-Dushenko =

American costume designer

Chrisi Karvonides-Dushenko is an American costume designer for theatre, film and television, recipient of Emmy award for American Dreams (2003) and nominated for several others.

Karvonides-Dushenko graduated from Yale School of Drama in 1991, MFA in theater design.

She is full professor and head of Costume Design at Theater, Film, and Television BA and MFA programs, UCLA.
