= Divorce in the Black =

2024 film by Tyler Perry

- Release poster
- Directed by: Tyler Perry
- Written by: Tyler Perry
- Produced by: Dianne Ashford; Will Areu; Angi Bones; Meagan Good; Tyler Perry
- Starring: Meagan Good; Cory Hardrict; Joseph Lee Anderson; Taylor Polidore; Shannon Wallace; Richard Lawson; Debbi Morgan
- Cinematography: Michael Watson
- Edited by: Storm Evans
- Music by: Sherri Chung
- Production companies: Amazon MGM Studios; Tyler Perry Studios
- Distributed by: Amazon Prime Video
- Release date: July 11, 2024
- Running time: 122 minutes
- Country: United States
- Language: English

Divorce in the Black (marketed as Tyler Perry's Divorce in the Black) is a 2024 American psychological drama thriller film directed by Tyler Perry and released on Amazon Prime Video. It stars Meagan Good as Ava, a young bank professional whose seemingly perfect marriage unravels when her husband abruptly leaves without explanation.

The film is a part of Tyler Perry's multi-picture deal with Amazon Studios, following previous collaborations with Netflix movies such as “A Jazzman’s Blues,” “A Madea Homecoming” and “A Fall from Grace”.

Principal photography began in 2023, and the film was officially announced by Amazon MGM Studios in early 2024. It attracted attention online due to its ensemble cast and Tyler Perry's return to dramatic filmmaking outside of his Madea franchise. The cast also includes Cory Hardrict, Joseph Lee Anderson, Taylor Polidore, Shannon Wallace, Richard Lawson, and Debbi Morgan.

Divorce in the Black was released on July 11, 2024, and received negative reviews from critics.

== Plot ==
Ava returns to her hometown with her husband Dallas to attend the funeral of his oldest brother. At the service, tensions rise when Ava's father, Clarence, a local preacher, offends Dallas's mother, Linda. After a heated argument, Linda orders her remaining sons to take the body from the church and bring it home. Ava stays behind to speak with her parents and her friend Rona, discussing her troubled relationship with Dallas.

Later, Ava goes to the Bertran family home to convince Dallas to return to Atlanta with her. In his old truck, Dallas accuses her of trying to change him and his family and tells her to leave. She falls asleep in her car waiting for him, but Linda wakes her and says Dallas is gone. Ava finds Dallas and his brothers drinking at a bar and pleads with him to leave. The brothers provoke a fight with Benji, a man Ava once nearly hooked up with as a teen. After a scuffle, Ava retrieves the truck keys and she and Dallas return to Ava's home. That night, Dallas drunkenly confesses that his mother made him kill his abusive father.

The next day, Rona asks why Ava stays with Dallas despite his behavior. Ava says she doesn't want to give up on him. That night, Dallas leaves Ava for taking too long to get ready for dinner with friends. At the restaurant, he publicly announces he wants a divorce. Rona comforts Ava and gives her a list of the terrible things Dallas has done during their marriage. Ava is reluctant to read it but ends up at her parents' house in the middle of the night.

In the morning, Ava tells her parents she and Dallas are divorcing. Her mother, Gene, finds the list and comforts Ava, expressing regret for not being there more. They decide not to tell Clarence, fearing his reaction. Over the next few days, Ava begins to regain a sense of peace. At a local carnival, she runs into Benji and they reflect on their past. Though Ava suggests being intimate, Benji says they should wait until she's emotionally ready.

Back at work, Ava tells Rona she's feeling better. Dallas shows up, having been misled by his brothers into believing Ava had an affair with Benji. He demands she attend the divorce meeting. While Rona urges Ava to take Dallas for everything, Ava wants a clean break. She signs the papers quickly. Rona later throws Ava a divorce party, inviting Benji. That night, Ava and Benji sleep together.

The next morning, Dallas shows up at Ava's house. He says he's willing to give her another chance and goes upstairs, only to find Benji in bed. A fight breaks out and Benji knocks Dallas unconscious. Ava drags Dallas to his truck and warns him never to return. Later, Clarence and the sheriff visit Benji, whose animals have been mysteriously dying. Benji suspects Dallas and accidentally reveals he was at Ava's that morning. Clarence rushes off to Ava’s where he changes her locks, installs cameras, and arms her for protection.

Meanwhile, Dallas assaults Gene at a grocery store. Clarence learns of this from the grocery clerk upon returning back to his hometown. Infuriated, he arms himself and goes to confront Dallas. When Clarence reaches the Bertran house and demands to see Dallas, the brothers ambush, shoot him, and beat him. Linda eventually tells them to stop, and Clarence is left injured outside. Ava and Benji arrive and call 911. At the hospital, doctors say Clarence is in bad shape, but the sheriff says there's no legal action they can take without evidence.

Determined to protect her family, Ava calls Dallas and taunts him into returning. She waits for him at home, and when he breaks in, she confronts him. She tells him she tried her best but he pushed her past her breaking point. Dallas attacks her, threatening to kill her. Ava warns him to stop, then shoots him in self-defense. Rona, Jim, and Benji arrive to support her.

Later, Ava, Benji, and Gene help Clarence out of the hospital. Linda, there with her wounded sons, threatens Ava again. Ava tells her it's over and walks away with her family, finally feeling safe and free.

== Cast ==
- Meagan Good as Ava
- Cory Hardrict as Dallas
- Joseph Lee Anderson as Benji
- Taylor Polidore as Rona
- Shannon Wallace as Jim
- Richard Lawson as Clarence
- Debbi Morgan as Gene

== Production ==
=== Development ===
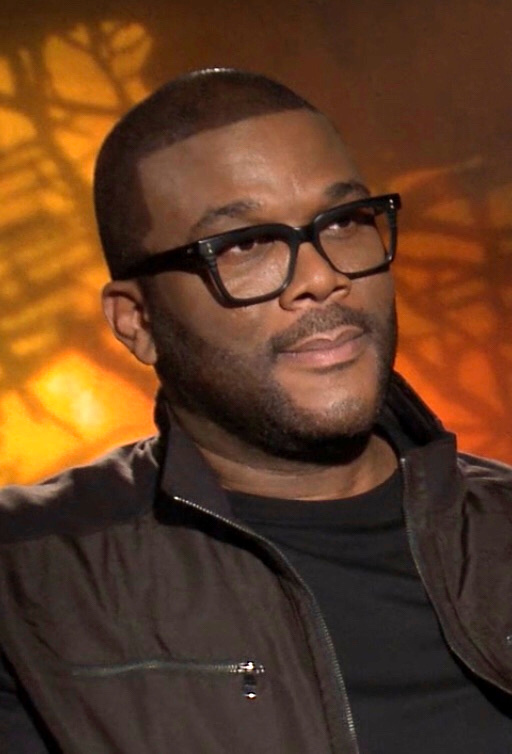
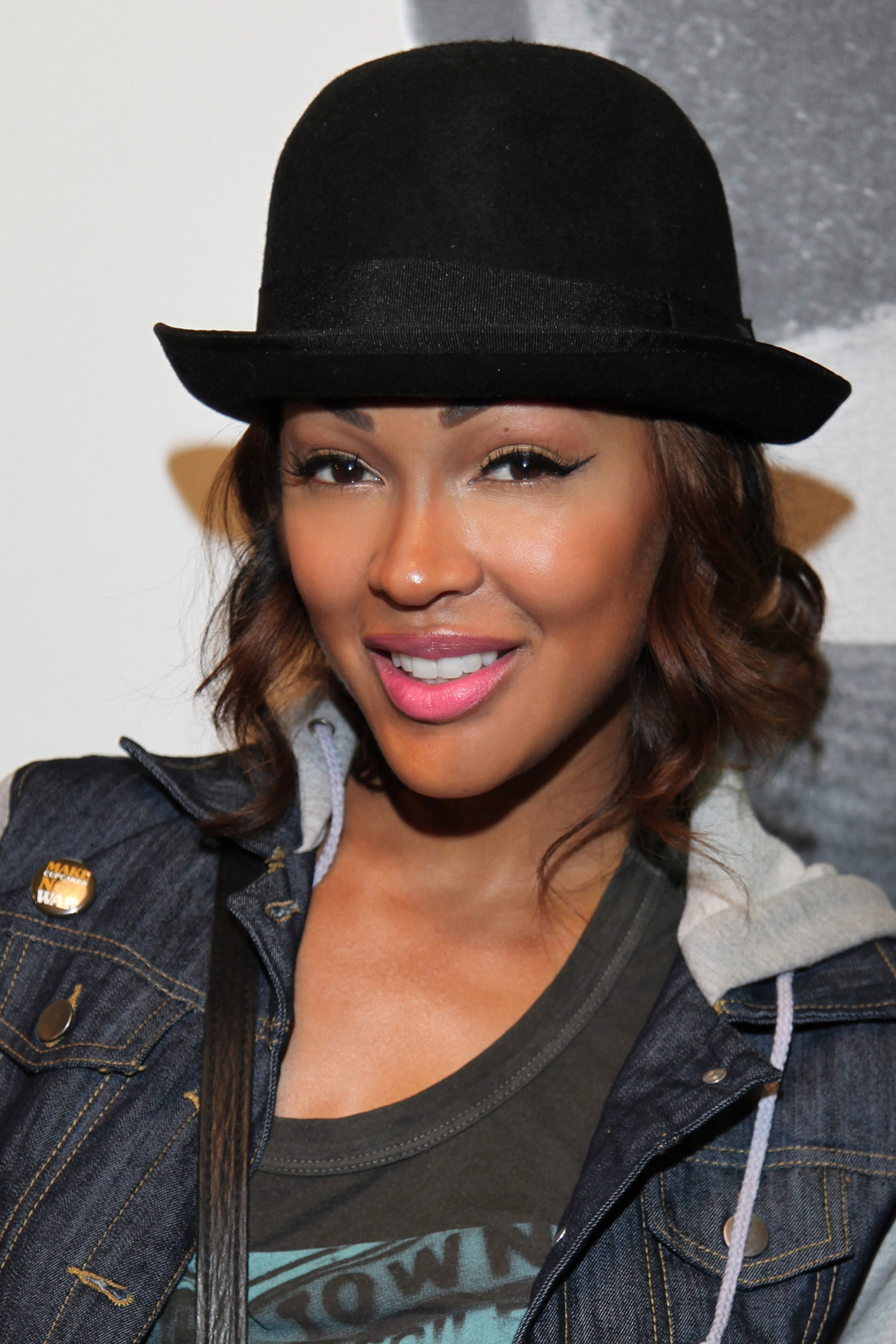
Director Tyler Perry (left) and actress Meagan Good

In November 2022, it was announced that Tyler Perry Studios had signed a four-film deal with Amazon Studios, under which Perry would write, produce, and direct four films for release on Prime Video. In June 2023, Divorce in the Black was confirmed as one of the first films to be developed under Perry's deal with Amazon Studios, alongside Black, White & Blue.

Meagan Good and Cory Hardrict were cast in the leading roles, with Joseph Lee Anderson, Taylor Polidore, Shannon Wallace, Richard Lawson, and Debbi Morgan joining the supporting cast.

The film was written, directed and produced by Tyler Perry. During the development of the film, Perry and Meagan Good discussed the characters' backstories, their circumstances at the time the story takes place, and the events that led them to that point. Good said the discussions focused on establishing the characters' journeys and making their progression believable.

Filming

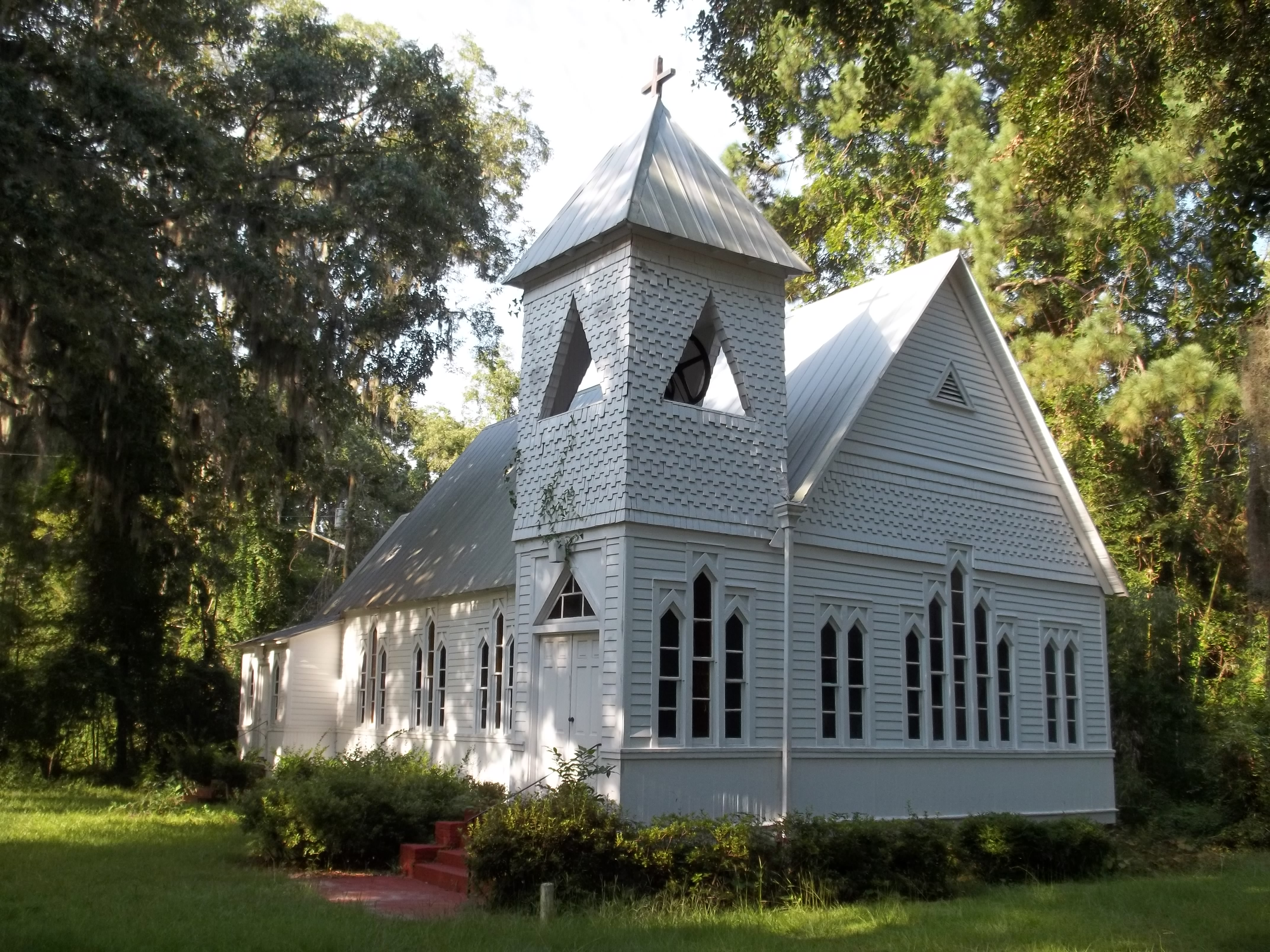
St. Bartholomew's Episcopal Church of Burroughs

Principal photography for Divorce in the Black began in June 2023 in the US state of Georgia, primarily in Atlanta, with some filming in Savannah. A significant portion of the film was shot at Tyler Perry Studios at 315 Deshler Street Southwest in Atlanta. Other filming took place in Fulton and DeKalb counties. Scenes were filmed at CODA in Tech Square, which was used as Ava's workplace, as well as locations used for shots of Downtown Atlanta. Some scenes were also filmed in Savannah, including scenes featuring Richard Lawson at Saint Bartholomew's Episcopal Church of Burroughs.

Michael Watson served as the director of photography on the film, using dim lighting in many of the scenes. Production designer Sharon Busse and set decorator Gretchen Gattuso worked on the film's sets, with the framing and blocking used to reflect the emotions of Ava and Dallas.

== Music ==
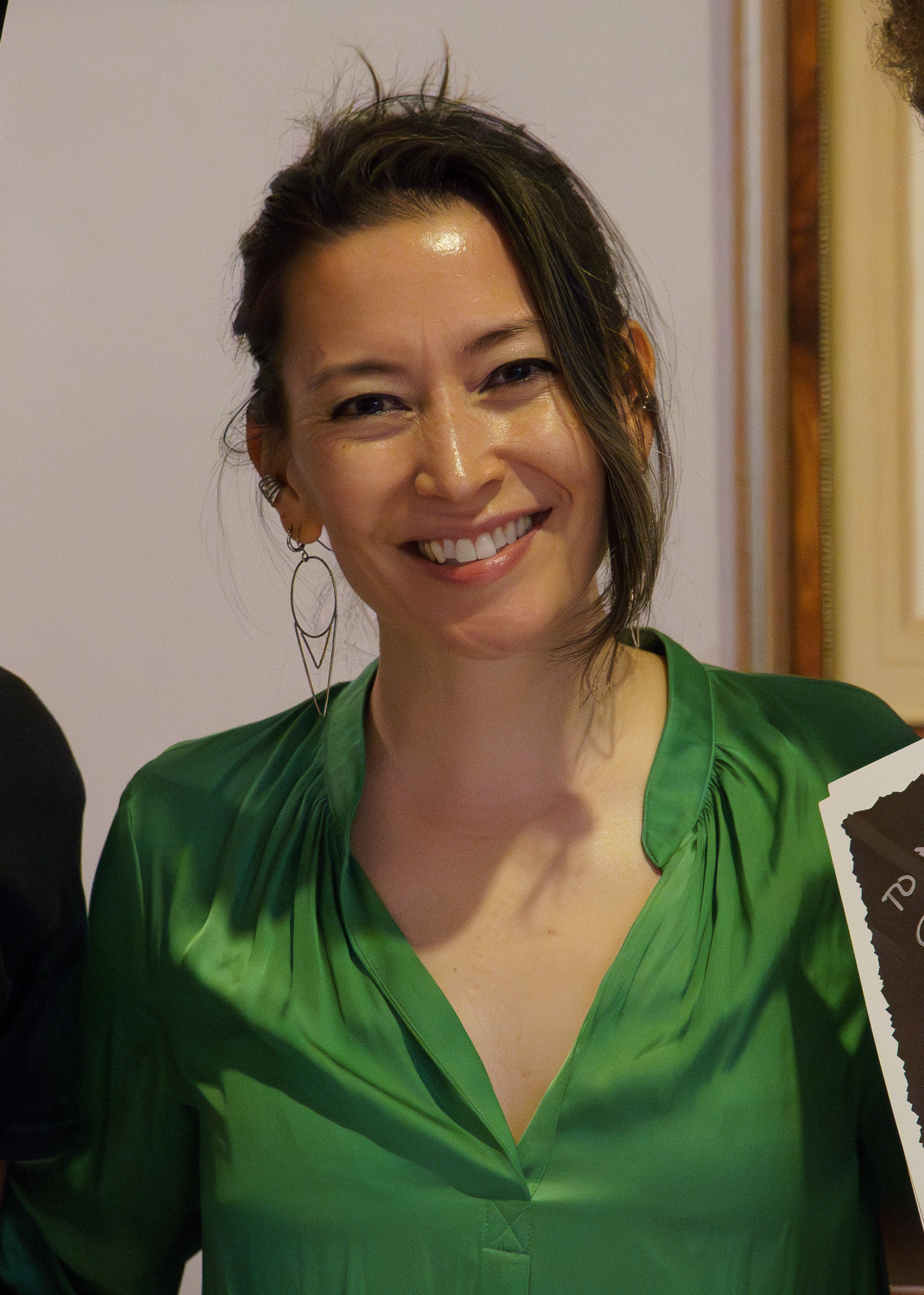
Sherri Chung (pictured in 2024), composed the original score

Divorce in the Black (Original Motion Picture Soundtrack) was scored by American composer Sherri Chung. The soundtrack contains 11 tracks. In addition to the original score, the film features a variety of songs spanning different genres, including country, pop, hip-hop, and gospel. Artists featured on the soundtrack include Pharrell Williams, Beyoncé, Chris Stapleton, Joy Oladokun, and Ledisi.

Musical numbers

- "My Uncle" – The Flying Burrito Brothers
- "Every Time We Way Goodbye" – Céleigh Chapman
- "Wait" – Kenyon Dixon
- "Look Up" – Joy Oladokun
- "Joy (Unspeakable)" – Voices Of Fire feat. Pharrell Williams
- "Either Way" – Chris Stapleton
- "Young Hearts Run Free" – Candi Staton
- "Lost In Love" – Jaira Noelani
- "Make Me Say It Again Girl" – The Isley Brothers feat. Beyoncé
- "Switch The Knob" – Bleu Levees
- "Switch The Knob" – Ledisi

== Release ==
Divorce in the Black was released exclusively on Amazon Prime Video on July 11, 2024. Prior to the release, Amazon MGM Studios debuted the official trailer on June 20, 2024.

== Reception ==
Audience viewership

Despite receiving negative critical reviews, Divorce in the Black was among the most viewed titles on Prime Video during its release week. A report by Variety indicated that the film contributed to a significant increase in new Amazon Prime Video subscriptions, surpassing previous records for the platform's original films at the time. According to The Source, the film attracted 498 million minutes watched within its first four days on the platform and ranked third on Nielsen's Top 10 streaming chart during the week of July 8 to14, 2024.

Critical response

On the review aggregator website Rotten Tomatoes, 0% of 17 critics' reviews are positive, with an average rating of 3.0/10. Metacritic, which uses a weighted average, assigned the film a score of 30 out of 100, based on 4 critic reviews, indicating "generally unfavorable reviews".

Andrew Lawrence of The Guardian described Divorce in the Black as "Tyler Perry's dull drama" and "his worst to date", criticizing the film for its lackluster plot and underdeveloped characters. He awarded it one out of five stars. Mary Kassel of Screen Rant gave the film two out of five stars, noting that "with inconsistent pacing and tonal shifts that make the audience question the story's purpose, Divorce in the Black doesn't stand out." Barry Levitt of The Daily Beast gave the film a negative review and wrote, "Good has been great for a long time, and while she can't save Divorce, her performance is a reminder that she's more than worthy of leading roles."

John Serba of Decider advised viewers to skip the film, describing it as a "shabby melodrama" with "clumsy plotting and poor character development," failing to reach the engrossing absurdity of Perry's previous works.

Audience response

Some viewers praised Meagan Good's performance and connected with the film's exploration of toxic relationships. Cory Hardrict, who portrayed Dallas, defended the film amid poor reviews, stating, "The people love the movie and we do it for the people, that's who I do it for. If the culture's rocking with it, it's all love."
