= Margaret Avery =

American actress

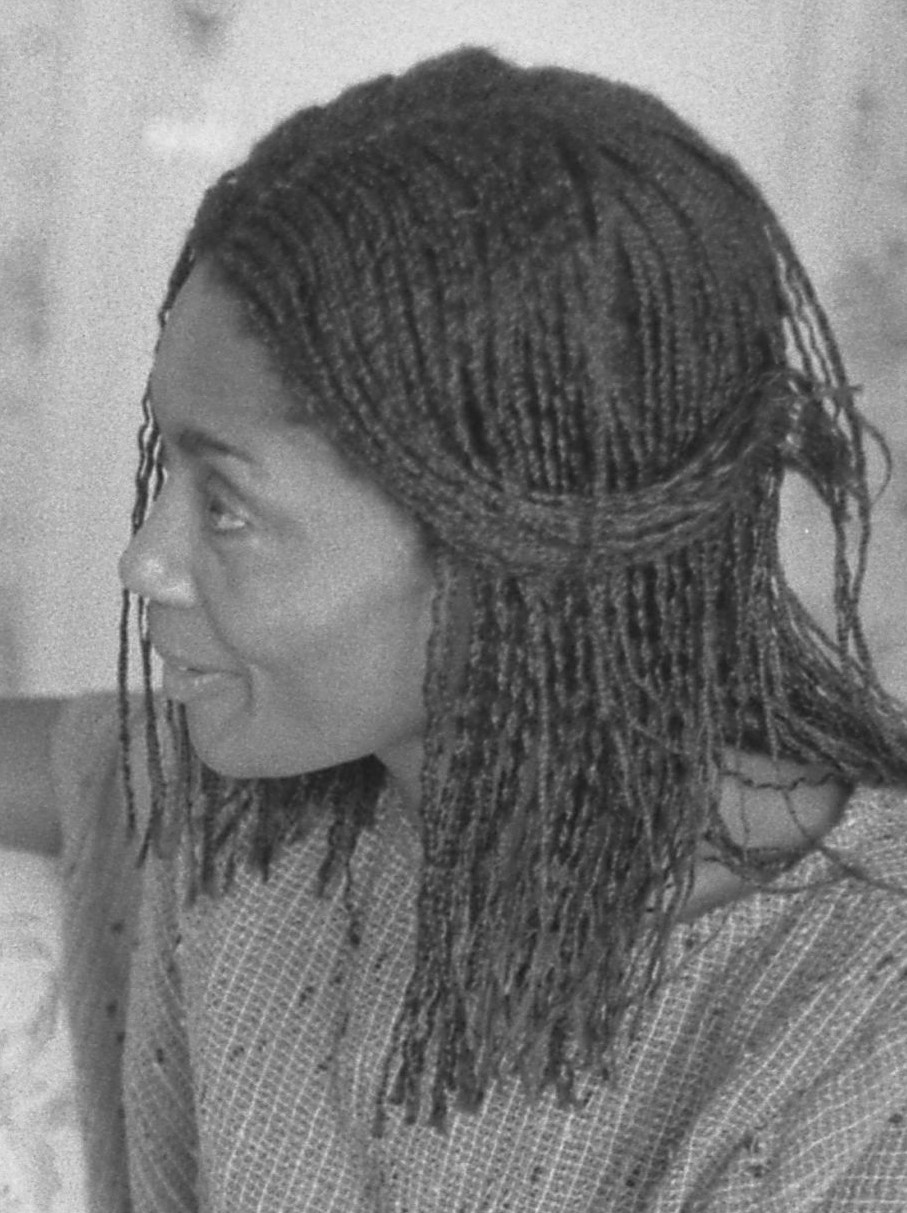
- Avery in 1986
- Born: Mangum, Oklahoma, U.S.
- Education: San Francisco State University; American Conservatory Theater; Phillips Graduate University
- Occupations: Actress, singer
- Years active: 1972–present
- Spouse: Robert Gordon Hunt (m. 1974; div. 1980)
- Children: 1

Margaret Avery is an American actress. She began her career appearing on stage and later had starring roles in films including Cool Breeze (1972), Which Way Is Up? (1977), Scott Joplin (1977) which earned her an NAACP Image Award nomination, and The Fish That Saved Pittsburgh (1979). She was nominated for an Academy Award for Best Supporting Actress for her portrayal of Shug Avery in the period drama film The Color Purple (1985).

Avery continued appearing in films like Blueberry Hill (1988), White Man's Burden (1995), Welcome Home Roscoe Jenkins (2008), Meet the Browns (2008), and Proud Mary (2018). From 2013 to 2019, Avery starred as Helen Patterson, lead character's mother, in the BET drama series Being Mary Jane.

== Early life and education ==
Margaret Avery grew up in San Diego and attended high school at the Point Loma High School in the city. She earned a degree in education in 1965 from San Francisco State University. While working as an elementary school teacher in Oakland, California, she began making singing and acting appearances. She studied with Judy Davis, the vocal coach for Frank Sinatra and Barbra Streisand as well as at the American Conservatory Theater. She moved to Los Angeles in 1968 to pursue acting full time, while working as a substitute teacher.

== Career ==
=== Early roles ===
Among the plays Avery appeared in were Revolution and The Sistuhs. In 1972, she received the Los Angeles Drama Critics Circle Award for Outstanding Performance by an Actress for her performance in Does a Tiger Wear a Necktie?. In the television movie Something Evil (1972), a horror story with Sandy Dennis and Darren McGavin, Avery was directed by Steven Spielberg. In the same year she made her theatrical motion picture debut as Lark in the crime film Cool Breeze with Thalmus Rasulala and Judy Pace. In this blaxploitation remake of The Asphalt Jungle, Avery played the Marilyn Monroe part. The next year she played a prostitute in Magnum Force, the second in the series of Dirty Harry films starring Clint Eastwood, in which her character was murdered by her pimp. The character was killed by pouring drain cleaner down the victim's throat, which was said to have inspired the notorious Hi-Fi murders case in Ogden, Utah in 1974.

Avery received an NAACP Image Award for her performance in the 1976 film Louis Armstrong - Chicago Style. In the 1977 film Which Way Is Up?, directed by Michael Schultz, Avery gave a comedic performance as Annie Mae, the wife of Richard Pryor's character. That same year, she played Belle Joplin, wife of the ragtime composer Scott Joplin, opposite Billy Dee Williams in the title role in film Scott Joplin, receiving an NAACP Image Award for Outstanding Actress in a Motion Picture nomination. In 1979, she appeared in The Fish That Saved Pittsburgh.

Avery made guest appearances on many television series during 1970s and 1980s including The New Dick Van Dyke Show, Kojak, Marcus Welby, M.D., Sanford and Son, Kolchak: The Night Stalker, The Rookies, five appearances on Harry O, A.E.S. Hudson Street, T. J. Hooker, Murder, She Wrote, Miami Vice, Spenser: For Hire, and The Cosby Show.

=== The Color Purple ===
In 1985, Avery played the role of Shug Avery in the period drama film The Color Purple directed by Steven Spielberg. Her performance in this screen adaptation of Alice Walker's prize-winning novel The Color Purple was nominated for an Academy Award for Best Supporting Actress. Avery was the last character to be cast in the film. In her Essence interview she said: "I had been singing in Indonesia and came back to find all these messages on my answering service from other actors saying, ‘Hey Margaret, you’ve got to get your agent on The Color Purple.’ My agent at the time had tried to get me an audition but was told that I wasn't right for the role— they wanted a singer, not an actor. I knew Ruben Cannon, who was casting at that time, because he'd cast me in so many television things before, so I wrote him a note. I had read the book and was drawn to Shug Avery. Ruben allowed me to put my reading for the role on tape. Because of him, I was able to get my work seen by Steven Spielberg. Alice Walker said that she had seen a lot of tapes of other actors, but when my audition came up, she just kind of woke up. She couldn't take her eyes off me. That was like a beautiful introduction to getting the role."

After The Color Purple and Oscar nomination, Avery did not work on film or television for two years. She said, "The fact that I didn’t work for a couple years after The Color Purple is not unique. It not only happens to White actors sometimes, but with Black actors, too, but more so for women of color. At the time, most women of color who were in the business were limited to Black film; whereas my counterpart like Danny Glover, went on to Lethal Weapon One, Two, and Three. He didn’t have to be limited to a Black film; he didn’t have to be married to a family, or related to somebody, like we women have to. I didn’t work for a couple years after The Color Purple. What saved me was the college lecture circuit. I kind of got a backlash for two reasons; one, no one would even think of me for a television role because they figured she’s too big to do TV now. That was the pattern."

=== Subsequent work ===
In 1988, Avery starred in the period drama film Blueberry Hill, and the following year appeared in action film Riverbend. In 1990, she appeared in The Return of Superfly, another blaxploitation film. In 1992, she starred in the ABC miniseries The Jacksons: An American Dream as Martha Scruse, mother of Katherine Jackson, who was played by Angela Bassett. In 1995, she co-starred opposite Harry Belafonte in the drama film White Man's Burden. The following years, she guest-starred on number of television series, including Walker, Texas Ranger, JAG, and Bones. In 2008, Avery played Mama Jenkins in Welcome Home Roscoe Jenkins, opposite Martin Lawrence and James Earl Jones, and Sarah Brown in Tyler Perry's Meet the Browns, which also stars Angela Bassett.

From 2013 to 2019, Avery played the role of Helen Patterson in the BET drama series, Being Mary Jane. She played Taraji P. Henson' mother in the 2018 action film Proud Mary. She later guest-starred on Grey's Anatomy and Better Things.

== Personal life ==
Avery lives in Los Angeles and remains active in show business. Continuing to act, she also works with at-risk teenagers and battered women of the greater Los Angeles area. She holds a master's in psychology degree from the Phillips Graduate University, and worked as a psychotherapist for the Los Angeles Unified School District. She was interviewed by Melody Trice on The Melody Trice Show about her activism. She is a spokesperson for the Lupus Foundation of America.

== Filmography ==
=== Film ===
Year	Title	Role	Notes
1972	Something Evil	Irene	
1972	Cool Breeze	Lark	
1972	Terror at Red Wolf Inn	Edwina	
1973	An Eye for an Eye	Nurse	
1973	Magnum Force	Prostitute	
1973	An Eye for an Eye	Nurse	
1973	Hell Up in Harlem	Sister Jennifer	
1976	Louis Armstrong - Chicago Style	Alma Rae	NAACP Image Award for Outstanding Actress in a Television Movie, Mini-Series or Dramatic Special
1977	Which Way Is Up?	Annie Mae	
1977	Scott Joplin	Belle Joplin	Nominated — NAACP Image Award for Outstanding Actress in a Motion Picture
1979	The Fish That Saved Pittsburgh	Toby Millman	
1980	The Sky Is Gray	Rosemary	
1980	The Lathe of Heaven	Heather LeLache	
1985	The Color Purple	Shug Avery	Nominated—Academy Award for Best Supporting Actress
1988	Blueberry Hill	Hattie Cale	
1989	Riverbend	Bell Coleman	
1989	Single Women Married Men	Grace Williams	
1990	Heat Wave	Roxie Turpin	
1990	The Return of Superfly	Francine	
1993	Lightning in a Bottle	Dr. Sierheed	
1993	Night Trap	Miss Sadie	
1994	Cyborg 3: The Recycler	Doc Edford	
1995	The Set-Up	Olivia Dubois	
1995	White Man's Burden	Megan Thomas	
1998	Love Kills	Moon	
2002	Waitin' to Live	Pearline Loggins	
2002	Second to Die	Insurance agent	
2007	Lord Help Us	Dorinda Thomas	
2007	Exodus	Robbed Tourist	
2008	Welcome Home Roscoe Jenkins	Mama Jenkins	
2008	Meet the Browns	Sarah Brown	
2009	Extrospection	Anna	
2018	Proud Mary	Mina	
2019	Grand-Daddy Day Care	Millie	
2022	We Are Gathered Here Today	Estelle Wyatt	
2022	Block Party	Janice Sommers	Also executive producer
2023	The Nana Project	Gladys	

=== Television ===
Year	Title	Role	Notes
1973	The New Dick Van Dyke Show	Pam Harris / Nurse Wilkinson	Episode: "What Your Best Friend Doesn't Know"
1973	Ironside	Bartender	Episode: "The Last Payment"
1974	Kojak	Lula	Episode: "You Can't Tell a Hurt Man How to Holler"
1974	Marcus Welby, M.D.	Julie	Episode: "The 266 Days"
1975	Sanford and Son	Denise	Episode: "Strange Bedfellows"
1975	Kolchak: The Night Stalker	Ruth Van Galen	Episode: "The Sentry"
1982	The Powers of Matthew Star	April	Episode: "Accused"
1983	For Us the Living: The Medgar Evers Story	Dottie	
1985	Murder, She Wrote	Dixie	Episode: "Jessica Behind Bars"
1987	Rags to Riches	Celia Richards (Cee Cee Smith)	
1987	Miami Vice	Sally Cordova	Episode: "The Afternoon Plane"
1992	The Jacksons: An American Dream	Martha Scruse	
1992	The Cosby Show	Leah	Episode: "Clair's Reunion"
1992	Roc	Helen	Episode: "The Lady Killer"
1998	Wie stark muss eine Liebe sein	Mary McMillian	German TV movie
2005	JAG	Indira Diamond	Episode: "Unknown Soldier"
2005	Bones	Ivy Gillespie	Episode: "The Man in the Fallout Shelter"
2012	Single Ladies	Josephine	Episode: "Ex Factor"
2013–19	Being Mary Jane	Helen Patterson	Main role: 34 episodes
2017	The Librarians	Eleanor Darnell	Episode: "And the Silver Screen"
2019	Grey's Anatomy	Lucille Reed	Episode: "I Walk the Line"
2019	Better Things	Esther	Episode: "Easter"
2021	The Neighborhood	Aunt Desiray	Episode: "Welcome to the Family"
2024	A Man on the Inside	Florence Joanne Whistbrook	Recurring role: 4 Episodes
2025	The Rookie	Ruth Harper	Episode: "Mutiny and the Bounty"
