= Taylor Polidore =

American actress

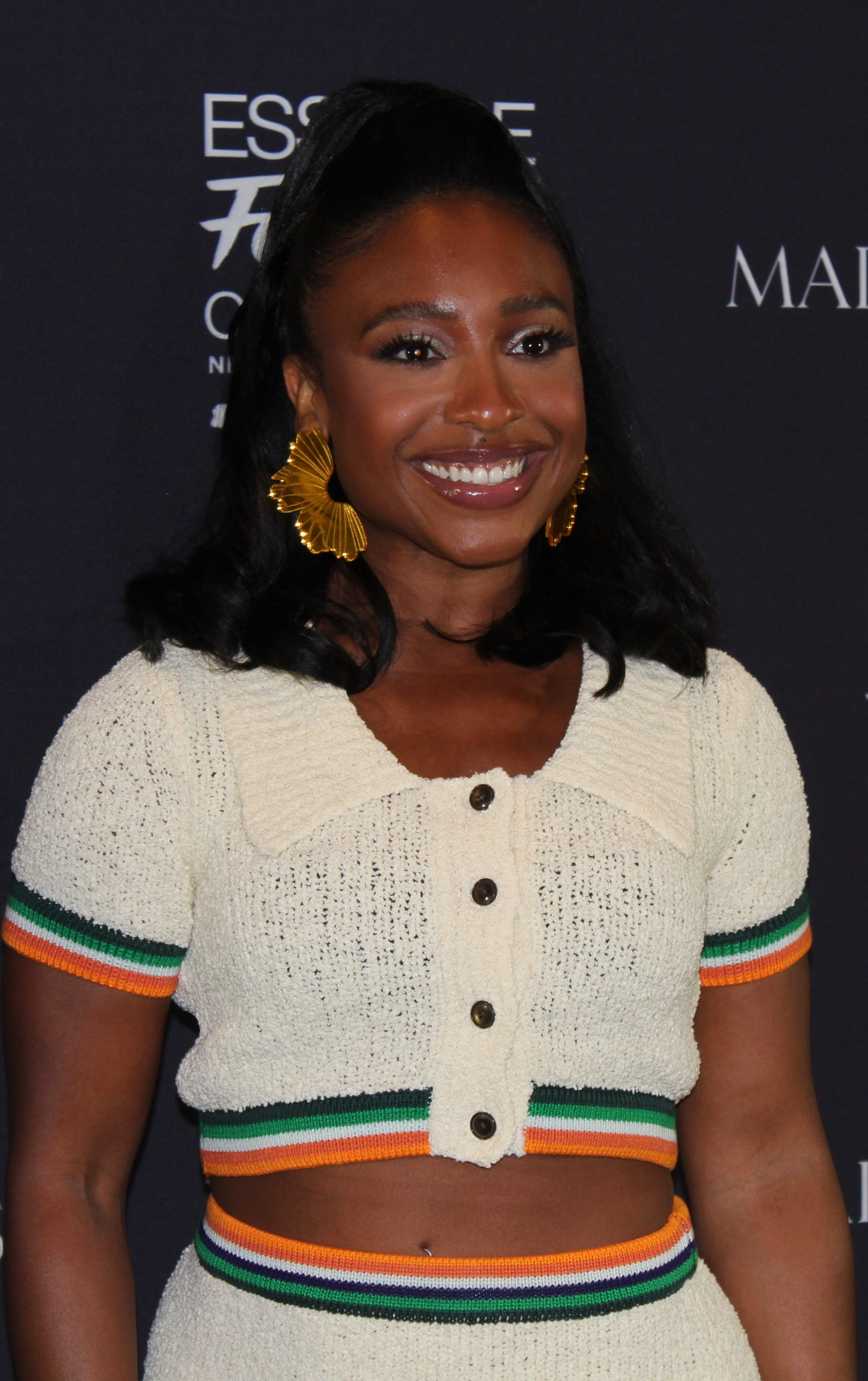
- Taylor Polidore at 2025 Essence Festival of Culture.
- Born: Houston, Texas, U.S
- Education: Clark Atlanta University (BA)
- Occupation: Actress
- Years active: 2008–present
- Spouse: Jero Williams (m. 2024)

Taylor Polidore is an American actress. She began her career playing the recurring roles on television series Snowfall and All American: Homecoming and in 2024 was cast in the leading role in the Netflix drama series, Beauty in Black.

== Life and career ==
Polidore was born and raised in Houston, Texas. She attended Seven Lakes High School in Katy, Texas, and graduated from the Clark Atlanta University with Bachelor of Arts in filmmaking. Polidore made her big screen debut playing a minor role in the 2008 comedy film, Welcome Home Roscoe Jenkins. She later appeared in true crime television series Snapped: Killer Couples and Fatal Attraction, and guest-starred in The Resident, Step Up: High Water and Genius: Aretha. From 2018 to 2019 she had a recurring role in the CW superhero series, Black Lightning.

From 2021 to 2023, Polidore played the role of hitman Dallas Ali in the FX crime drama series, Snowfall. From 2022 to 2023 she had the recurring role in the CW sports drama series, All American: Homecoming. Later in 2022, Polidore was cast as one of leads in the Allblk supernatural drama series, Wicked City. In 2023 she was cast in the drama-thriller film Divorce in the Black by Tyler Perry. In 2024, Perry cast Polidore as one of leads alongside Crystle Stewart in his Netflix drama series, Beauty in Black.

== Personal life ==
On May 4, 2024, Polidore married Jero Williams, a surgery resident from Atlanta, after getting engaged on Christmas Day in 2022.

== Filmography ==
=== Film ===
Year	Title	Role	Notes
2008	Welcome Home Roscoe Jenkins	Homely Girl	
2016	All My Friends Are Dead	Lana	Short
2016	Defending Daddy	Adult Jasmine	Short
2016	Mosaic	Mara Anderson	
2017	Back to One: First Position	Alicia	
2017	Dirty South House Arrest	Zenobia	
2018	Not Your Rib	Paris	Short
2019	With(out) You	Bavette	Short
2020	The Ride	Isabel 'Bell' King	Short
2024	Divorce in the Black	Rona	

=== Television ===
Year	Title	Role	Notes
2013	Snapped: Killer Couples	Nikki Hill	Episode: "Rachel Cumberland & John Williams"
2013	Fatal Attraction	Denita Smith	Episode: "Collegiate Killing"
2015	Fatal Attraction	Sharon	Episode: "A Lethal Love"
2015	College Boyfriends: The Web Series	Cassie Latimore	Episode: "Different Day, Same Ol Shit"
2018	The Resident	Treena	Episode: "Independence Day"
2018	Step Up: High Water	Student #1	Episode: "Pilot"
2018	The Pre-Quarter Life Crisis	Theia LeRoux	Main cast
2018-19	Black Lightning	Lisa	Recurring role (seasons 1, 3)
2019-22	Curious George	Vinnie (voice)	Guest (seasons 11-13); recurring role (season 15)
2020-21	It's Pony	Clara (voice)	Recurring role
2020-21	Rival Speak	Lilian	Main cast
2021	Black Kung Fu Chick	Tasha	Main cast
2021	Genius: Aretha	Darlene	Episode: "Aretha: Do Right Woman"
2021	Nick Shorts Showcase	Clara (voice)	Episode: "Hold My Spot/Screen Time"
2021	The Loud House	Shelby (voice)	Episode: "Lori Days/In the Mick of Time"
2021-23	Snowfall	Dallas	Recurring role (seasons 4-6)
2022-23	Wicked City	Camille	Main cast (season 1), recurring role (season 2)
2022-24	All American: Homecoming	Tootie	Recurring role (seasons 2-3)
2023	Big City Greens	Additional Voices (voice)	Episode: "Truck Stopped/Jingled"
2024-present	Beauty in Black	Kimmie	Main cast
