= The Guernsey Literary and Potato Peel Pie Society (soundtrack) =

2018 film soundtrack album

The Guernsey Literary and Potato Peel Pie Society (Original Motion Picture Soundtrack)

Film score by Alexandra Harwood
- Released: 18 May 2018
- Recorded: AIR Lyndhurst Hall, London; AIR-Edel Studios, London
- Genre: Film score
- Length: 46:47
- Label: Decca Classics
- Producer: Alexandra Harwood

Alexandra Harwood chronology
The Secret Life of Kittens (2017)	The Guernsey Literary and Potato Peel Pie Society (2018)	The Escape (2018)

The Guernsey Literary and Potato Peel Pie Society (Original Motion Picture Soundtrack) is the film score album to the 2018 film The Guernsey Literary and Potato Peel Pie Society directed by Mike Newell. The original score is composed by Alexandra Harwood and was recorded at the AIR Lyndhurst Hall and AIR-Edel Studios in London, and was released through Decca Classics on 18 May 2018.

== Background ==
The original score is composed by Alexandra Harwood. Mike Newell, the producers Paula Mazur and Graham Broadbent, editor Paul Tothill found Harwood's music which they used as a temp score in the assembly edit. Six months later, they contacted Harwood to involve in the film, which she agreed to. Harwood described Newell as the generous and respectful director providing her complete freedom to work on the score, while also completing Newell's knowledge of music. She further admitted that she became familiar with the film and source material, having ensuring a good working relationship with Newell and Broadbent. Harwood wrote fifteen cues to the earlier edits, while the rest of the score had been temped with Harwood's music from her previous films, placed perfectly by Tothill at specific spotting sessions.

Harwood considered the importance of relating to the story and characters, that could help in scoring the film. She added she could identify Juliet's character in her quest to discover herself through the music which was eventually important. She further liked the soft and quiet approach of the film, that helped to provide a calmer tone for writing the themes. As those themes emerged in the score, she eventually liked the process where the music starts to unfold itself being unconscious of the writing process. Some of the themes were written and composed at her home studio, which was conveninet for her to take breaks for relaxation.

The first of the cues written to picutre was the final cue, in the climax that had frequent stops and starts in the emotional flow and build, and that the piece was long and the most difficult cue. The original cue was temped in the edit for months, and before the recording and orchestration began, one of the producers asked to write another version of the cue, that demanded more of a climax and wanting to carry it for long. Harwood then wrote the complete theme from 9:00 p.m. to 3:00 a.m. that night over intense focus. She felt the request to be fortuitous and she could tie the themes that had subsequently written for other parts of that film, which did not existed when she originally wrote the cue and the new version made it to the final score.

Harwood was actively involved in the preparation of the large scale recording sessions at AIR Lyndhurst Hall and AIR-Edel Studios in London. She worked with her assistant Daniel Gadd on the stem music, while sending the cues to Mark Willsher for pro tools, and simultaneously send it to her orchestrator Geoff Alexander who would prepare the scores and send them back cue by cue. Alexander further conducted the orchestra as well. The score was recorded by Nick Taylor and assisted by Fiona Cruickshank. Harwood considered the recording sessions to be enjoyable under the supervision of Newell, Tothill and Broadbant, and also send few video clips of the sessions she had recorded in the phone to producer Paula Mazur who was in Los Angeles during that time.

== Reception ==
Jonathan Broxton of Movie Music UK wrote "If one was to make a couple of criticisms of the score it would be to say that it perhaps gets a little repetitive during its middle section, and that the various individual themes are not well defined or distinct enough for them to be clearly identifiable, even after several listens, but these are minor quibbles in what is otherwise an impressive mainstream film music debut." Ben of Soundtrack Universe wrote "The Guernsey Literary and Potato Peel Pie Society is a score that comes highly recommended to all film music fans... and even more casual listeners". Harry Windsor of The Hollywood Reporter and Guy Lodge of Variety considered the score to be "emotional" and "calm". Rodney Twelftree of Fernby Films wrote "Alexandra Harwood's accompanying score is both soothing and appropriately thematic."

== Track listing ==
No.	Title	Length
1.	"The Guernsey Literary and Potato Peel Pie Society"	5:36
2.	"Prelude"	2:48
3.	"Dawsey's First Letter"	2:27
4.	"The First Winter"	4:29
5.	"Across the Sea"	1:48
6.	"Arrival"	2:39
7.	"Goodbye To Their Children"	2:10
8.	"Amelia's Loss"	3:02
9.	"Looking For Truth"	1:41
10.	"Elizabeth and Christian"	1:55
11.	"At the Bottom of the Sea"	1:37
12.	"Juliet and Kit"	1:57
13.	"Into the Night"	3:15
14.	"Older Than Time"	2:09
15.	"Home"	2:02
16.	"The Typewriter Theme"	1:25
17.	"Written For You"	2:38
18.	"Juliet and Dawsey"	3:09
Total length:		46:47

== Accolades ==
Award	Category	Recipients	Result	Ref.
International Film Music Critics Association	International Film Music Critics Association Award for Breakthrough Composer of the Year	Alexandra Harwood	Nominated	
World Soundtrack Awards	Discovery of the Year	Alexandra Harwood	Nominated	
