= Mary Shelley (soundtrack) =

Mary Shelley (Original Motion Picture Soundtrack)

Film score by Amelia Warner
- Released: May 25, 2018
- Genre: Film score
- Length: 38:44
- Label: Decca
- Producer: Amelia Warner

Amelia Warner chronology
Leading Lady Parts (2018)	Mary Shelley (2018)	Wild Mountain Thyme (2020)

Mary Shelley (Original Motion Picture Soundtrack) is the film score to the 2017 film Mary Shelley directed by Haifaa al-Mansour, starring Elle Fanning as the eponymous writer. Amelia Warner composed the musical score, which was released on May 25, 2018, through Decca Records.

== Development ==
The film score is composed by former actress-turned-musician Amelia Warner in her sophomore outing since Mum's List (2016). Al-Mansour had listened to Warner's music while filming in Ireland and Luxembourg, and having liked her compositions, roped her for the project. Warner said that she had read Frankenstein during her school days and became "a bit besotted" with the novel, but was unaware on the author who was then 18-years old, while writing the novel, and "was so progressive in her thinking". Upon her involvement, Warner recalled that they wanted the music "to express Mary's inner world at every moment" as the main direction and had to "feel haunting and gothic as the inspiration for this monster grows and grows inside of her". She was also keen on portraying Mary's relationship with Percy (Douglas Booth).

Despite the film's 19th century setting, Warner infused the score with synthesizers to provide a contemporary feel, referencing to the temp music, which had contemporary tracks, worked well which led to the use of modernistic sounds especially for the galvanization scenes and the Geneva section. Warner had pushed synths and drones to provide a "warped, otherworldly feel". Around 100 musicians gathered at the Dublin recording studio to play the score live, which had a large string section, harp and a choir that accompanied soprano and counter tenor vocals provided the backbone of the score. She further intensified on the third act to underscore Mary's anguished creation of the Frankenstein legend, where she recorded a "breathing and a heartbeat sound to make it feel visceral", as it emphasizes on audience going through these experiences with Mary. The piece had discordant and slightly off pitch vocals, being layered up with synths to make it feel like "the music was coming in peaks and troughs, like waves".

== Reception ==
Jonathan Broxton of Movie Music UK wrote "there is something about the way Warner phrases her instruments, something about her writing, that is unexpectedly captivating. Considering that this is only Amelia Warner’s second feature score, and considering that she has no formal classical musical education and appears to be entirely self-taught, this is an impressive piece of work. Clearly her years as an actress has given her a keen sense of the dramatic – so much so that her music is much more sophisticated and dramatically adept than one would expect from someone with her comparative lack of experience. Although quite a significant amount of the score is concerned more with texture and mood than themes and variations, the moods that Warner creates are a perfect accompaniment for the life of one of literature’s great tragic heroines – a woman whose spark of genius resulted in the creation of a modern Prometheus that has endured in the public’s imagination for almost 200 years." to Thor Joachim Haga of Celluloid Tunes wrote "It's not a score that blows you away in its ingenuity, but it's one of the best listening experiences of the year so far." Calling it "a wonderful score", Pete Simons of Synchrotones added "this score came completely out of the blue, and is one of the most exciting scores of the year". Caroline Cao of Film School Rejects called it a "translucent score". Marjorie Baumgarten of The Austin Chronicle called it "a turgid musical score". David Ehrlich of IndieWire listed it as one of the best film scores of 2018, under the special mention category.

== Track listing ==
No.	Title	Length
1.	"Mary Shelley"	2:02
2.	"Storm In the Stars"	1:57
3.	"My Sanctuary"	3:01
4.	"Rights of Women"	1:12
5.	"Mary's Decision"	2:27
6.	"We Shall Become the Same"	1:34
7.	"It's Time We Left This Place"	1:35
8.	"An Unreal Mystery"	3:27
9.	"Bloomsbury"	2:26
10.	"Mary Meets Percy"	1:57
11.	"King's Cross"	1:26
12.	"Caged Bird"	1:04
13.	"Mary's Nightmare"	2:59
14.	"The Book"	3:24
15.	"Seance"	1:30
16.	"Scotland"	1:32
17.	"None of This Will Matter At All"	1:14
18.	"Clara"	2:58
19.	"Lost In Darkness and Distance"	0:59
Total length:		38:44

== Accolades ==
Award	Category	Recipients	Result	Ref.
International Film Music Critics Association	International Film Music Critics Association Award for Breakthrough Composer of the Year	Amelia Warner	Won	
World Soundtrack Awards	Discovery of the Year	Amelia Warner	Nominated	
