= Daniel Morris (disambiguation) =

Daniel Morris was an American politician.

Daniel Morris may also refer to:

- Daniel Morris (botanist) (1844–1933), British administrator, horticulturist and botanist
- Daniel Morris, member of the band Band of Oz (2005–present)

== See also ==
- Danny Morris (disambiguation)
