= Henry Alexander Saturnin Hartley =

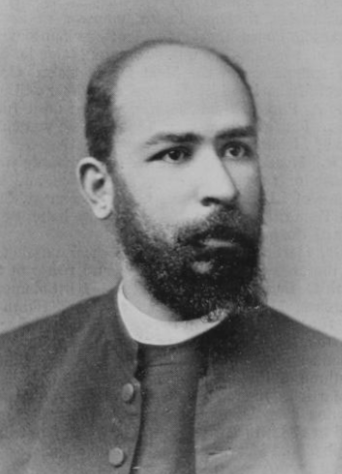
- Born: December 18, 1861; Port of Spain, British West Indies
- Died: October 14, 1934 (aged 72)
- Education: University of Paris; Central Tennessee College
- Occupations: Clergyman, lawyer, physician
- Spouse: Naomi Locke (m. 1883; died 1884)

Henry Alexander Saturnin Hartley (December 18, 1861 – October 14, 1934) was a missionary preacher, teacher, lawyer, and doctor in Canada, the United States, and South America.

== Biography ==
Henry Alexander Saturnin Hartley was born on December 18, 1861, in Port of Spain, Trinidad.

He studied at the University of Paris and worked in Trinidad including overseeing a leper colony before being dismissed for negligence. Hartley went on to various church appointments and postings. He studied in Canada and the United States. He served as a pastor at churches in Burroughs, Georgia.

He married Naomi Locke in London on June 25, 1883. She died in Paris in 1884 after giving birth to twins, who also died shortly afterward.

Hartley wrote a memoir in 1890.

On June 16, 1891, he received an honorary Doctor of Divinity degree from Wilberforce University. On May 23, 1893, he earned an LL.B from Central Tennessee College.

Hartley died in 1934. In his will, he left $1,000 to Wilberforce University to endow a silver medal to be awarded yearly to the best student in Greek.

== Publications ==
- Classical Translations (1889)
- Ta Tou Pragma Emou Biou, or Some Concerns of My Life (1890)
