= Danny Morris (disambiguation) =

Danny Morris is a baseball player.

Danny Morris may also refer to:

- Danny Morris (producer)
- Danny Morris, character in The Feed (British TV series)

== See also ==
- Daniel Morris (disambiguation)
