= DeWayne Jessie =

American character actor

DeWayne Jessie (a.k.a. "Otis Day") is an American character actor best known for his portrayal of fictional frontman Otis Day of Otis Day and the Knights in National Lampoon's Animal House. In the movie, the songs "Shama Lama Ding Dong" and "Shout" were sung by Lloyd G. Williams and lip-synched by Jessie.

In the 1980s, Jessie purchased the rights to the band name Otis Day and The Knights from Universal Studios, and formed a real-life version of the band with some members of his family. He toured the country for years afterward, with Jessie assuming the identity of Otis Day. The group released a concert video, Otis My Man, in 1987 and recorded an album, produced by George Clinton, that came out in 1989 titled Shout which flopped. It included updated versions of "Shout" and "Shama Lama Ding Dong" sung by Jessie.

Jessie and the rest of the band members were initiated as honorary members of Tau Kappa Epsilon fraternity at the University of Central Oklahoma in 1985. He lives with three of his grandchildren.

== Filmography ==
Year	Title	Role	Notes
1970	Halls of Anger	Lerone Johnson	
1972	The New Centurions	Mugging Suspect	Uncredited
1974	The Crazy World of Julius Vrooder	Rodali	
1975	Darktown Strutters	V.D.	
1976	Sparkle	Ham	
1976	The Bingo Long Traveling All-Stars & Motor Kings	Rainbow, All-Star (bat boy)	
1976	Car Wash	Lloyd	
1977	Fun with Dick and Jane	Robber #2	
1977	Which Way Is Up?	Sugar	
1977	Scott Joplin	John The Baptist	TV movie
1978	Thank God It's Friday	Floyd	
1978	National Lampoon's Animal House	Otis Day	
1980	Where the Buffalo Roam	Man #1	
1980	Gorp	Sweet Moe	
1983	The Star Chamber	Stanley Flowers	
1983	D.C. Cab	Bongo	
1986	Otis Day and the Knights: Otis My Man!		Documentary
2007	Drawn Together		Cameo
