= J. C. Legree =

American politician

Joshua C. Legree was a political organizer and politician in Georgia during the Reconstruction era. He was the first mayor of Burroughs, Georgia.

== See also ==
- African American officeholders from the end of the Civil War until before 1900
