= Which Way Is Up? =

1977 film by Michael Schultz

- Theatrical release poster
- Directed by: Michael Schultz
- Written by: Carl Gottlieb; Cecil Brown
- Based on: The Seduction of Mimi by Lina Wertmüller
- Produced by: Steve Krantz
- Starring: Richard Pryor; Lonette McKee; Margaret Avery
- Cinematography: John A. Alonzo
- Edited by: Danford B. Greene
- Music by: Mark Davis; Paul Riser
- Production company: Universal Pictures
- Distributed by: Universal Pictures
- Release date: November 4, 1977
- Running time: 94 minutes
- Language: English
- Budget: $3 million

Which Way is Up? is a 1977 American comedy film starring Richard Pryor and directed by Michael Schultz. It is an American version of the 1972 Italian comedy film The Seduction of Mimi. Richard Pryor plays three roles: an orange picker who has two women at the same time, the orange picker's father, and a reverend who gets the orange picker's wife pregnant.

== Plot ==
When he falls into a union action by mistake, Leroy Jones is forced out of town. The only option given to Leroy was a one way bus ticket to Los Angeles, where more jobs are available. While he is away, Leroy becomes smitten with Vanetta, a beautiful labor activist. When he returns home, he has to juggle his wife, his new romance with Vanetta, and his new job. Meanwhile, the Reverend Lenox Thomas takes advantage of Leroy's absence to cavort with Annie Mae, leading Leroy to take revenge with the reverend's wife.

== Cast ==
- Richard Pryor as Leroy Jones / Rufus Jones / Reverend Lenox Thomas
- Lonette McKee as Vanetta
- Margaret Avery as Annie Mae
- Morgan Woodward as Mr. Mann
- Marilyn Coleman as Sister Sarah
- BeBe Drake-Hooks as Thelma
- Gloria Edwards as Janelle
- Ernesto Hernandez as Jose Reyes
- Otis Day as Sugar
- Morgan Roberts as Henry
- Diane Rodriguez as Estrella Reyes
- Dolph Sweet as The Boss
- Carmen Filpi as Wino
- Victor Argo as Angel
- Marc Alaimo as Frankie
- Timothy Thomerson as Tour Guide
- Danny Valdez as Chuy Estrada
- Luis Valdez as Ramon Juarez
- Harry Northup as Chief Goon
- Paul Mooney as Inspector

== Reception ==
TV Guide rated Which Way Is Up? 1/5 stars and wrote that Pryor plays his character as unlikable, making the film unfunny.
