= Wicked City (2022 TV series) =

- Genre: Supernatural drama
- Created by: Kristin Iris Johnson; Serena M. Lee
- Starring: Vanessa Bell Calloway; Taylor Polidore; Shaquita Smith; Mercedez McDowell; Chantal Maurice; Chanel Mack; Rhonda Morman; Malika Blessing; Rolonda Rochelle; Gary Anthony Sturgis
- Composer: Teddy Alexander Bishop
- Country of origin: United States
- Original language: English
- No. of seasons: 3
- No. of episodes: 23

Production
- Executive producers: Donte Lee; Tressa Azarel Smallwood; Brett Dismuke; Nikki Love
- Running time: 42 minutes
- Production company: MegaMind Media

Original release
- Network: Allblk
- Release: December 1, 2022 – present

Wicked City is an American supernatural drama television series created by Kristin Iris Johnson and Serena M. Lee. The series follows the lives of a group of young modern-day witches in Atlanta. The series starring Vanessa Bell Calloway, Taylor Polidore, Shaquita Smith, Mercedez McDowell, Chantal Maurice, Chanel Mack, Rhonda Morman, Malika Blessing, Columbus Short and Rolonda Rochelle.

The six-episode first season premiered on the streaming service Allblk on December 1, 2022. The 8-episode second season premiered on October 19, 2023. On February 15, 2024, the series was renewed for a third season. The third season premiered on Oct 17, 2024.

== Cast and characters ==
- Vanessa Bell Calloway as Tabitha the owner of Charm City Awakening and longtime mentor to the coven.
- Taylor Polidore as Camille
- Shaquita Smith as Jordan Davis
- Mercedez McDowell as Mona De La Cruz
- Chantal Maurice as Angela Harris
- Chanel Mack as Sherise Baker
- Rhonda Morman as Claudette
- Malika Blessing as Caden
- Gary Anthony Sturgis as Julius (season 2)
- Columbus Short (guest season 1) and Maurice P. Kerry as The Handler (season 2)
- Rolonda Rochelle as Kendria
- Marco Reese Maldonado as Javi (season 2)

== Episodes ==
Season	Episodes	Originally released	
Season	Episodes	First released	Last released
1	6	December 1, 2022	January 5, 2023
2	8	October 19, 2023	December 7, 2023
3	7	October 17, 2024	November 28, 2024
