= Shama Lama Ding Dong =

Song by Mark Davis

Song by Otis Day and the Knights

from the album National Lampoon's Animal House
- Released: 1978
- Genre: R&B
- Length: 2:55
- Label: MCA
- Songwriter: Mark Davis
- Producer: Mark Davis

"Shama Lama Ding Dong" is a song written by Mark Davis and performed by fictional band Otis Day and the Knights in the 1978 film National Lampoon's Animal House. Although Otis Day was portrayed by DeWayne Jessie in the film, the lead vocals were actually performed by Lloyd G. Williams, with backing vocals provided by Melvin Britt and Sidney Juston.

A version of the song, by beach music group Band of Oz, won People's Choice Song of the Year at the 1995 Carolina Beach Music Awards. It was also covered by John Mellencamp as the B-side of his 1987 single "Cherry Bomb." It also is often covered by the jam band Goose.

The song was included on two albums by the University of California Men's Octet. It has also been performed and recorded by the Dartmouth Aires at Dartmouth College, the school on which Animal House was modeled.

== See also ==
- "Rama Lama Ding Dong", a 1957 song by The Edsels
- "Shamma Lamma Ding Dong", a track on the 2004 jazz album Enter the Mowo! by Mocean Worker
- "Shama Lama Ding Dong", a song performed live by Goose in their live concerts.
- "Shama Lama Ding-Dong", a song performed live by Rats & Star in their live concerts.
