= Blueberry Hill (1988 film) =

- Directed by: Strathford Hamilton
- Written by: Lonon F. Smith
- Produced by: Ron Altbach
- Starring: Jennifer Rubin; Carrie Snodgress; Margaret Avery
- Cinematography: David Lewis
- Edited by: Marcy Levitas Hamilton
- Music by: Ira Ingber
- Production company: Metro-Goldwyn-Mayer
- Distributed by: MGM/UA Communications Co.
- Release date: 1988
- Running time: 93 minutes
- Country: United States
- Language: English

Blueberry Hill is a 1988 American coming of age drama film directed by Strathford Hamilton and starring Jennifer Rubin.

== Cast ==
- Jennifer Rubin
- Carrie Snodgress as Becca Dane
- Margaret Avery
- Matt Lattanzi as Denny Logan

== Premise ==
A small-town girl in the 1950s turns to a woman jazz singer for advice and comfort after her musician father dies suddenly. She discovers she has inherited her father's musical talents and learns some disturbing family secrets.

== Reception ==
Blueberry Hill opened on 182 locations in the United States and grossed just $31,652 in its opening weekend, which Variety called at the time "the worst opening frame for any film in recent memory".
