= Scott Joplin (film) =

1977 film by Jeremy Kagan

- Directed by: Jeremy Kagan
- Written by: Christopher Knopf
- Produced by: Stanley Hough; Janet Hubbard
- Starring: Billy Dee Williams
- Cinematography: David M. Walsh
- Edited by: Patrick Kennedy
- Music by: Scott Joplin; Dick Hyman
- Production company: Motown Productions
- Distributed by: NBC; Universal Pictures
- Release date: February 11, 1977
- Running time: 96 minutes
- Country: United States
- Language: English

Scott Joplin is a 1977 biographical film directed by Jeremy Kagan and based on the life of African-American composer and pianist Scott Joplin. It stars Billy Dee Williams and Clifton Davis. Its script won an award from the Writers Guild of America in 1979. Eubie Blake makes an appearance in the movie.

== Plot ==
In the late 19th century, Scott Joplin, a young African-American musician, moves to Missouri and to make ends meet finds a job as a piano teacher. He befriends Louis Chauvin, who plays the piano in a brothel.

Joplin composes ragtime music. One day his "Maple Leaf Rag" is heard by John Stark, a publisher of sheet music in Sedalia, Missouri and later St. Louis, Missouri. Stark is impressed, buys the rights to the composition and sells it, with Joplin sharing some of the profits. Joplin's new songs also achieve a great popularity.

Chauvin is equally talented, but contracts syphilis and dies in his 20s. Joplin becomes obsessed with composing more serious music, yet is continually thwarted in his attempt to write and publish an opera.

== Cast ==
- Billy Dee Williams as Scott Joplin
- Clifton Davis as Louis Chauvin
- Margaret Avery as Belle Joplin
- Eubie Blake as Will Williams, the judge of the piano cutting contest on August 18, 1899
- Godfrey Cambridge as Tom Turpin (posthumous appearance)
- Art Carney as John Stark
- Seymour Cassel as Dr. Jaelki
- DeWayne Jessie as John The Baptist
- Taj Mahal as Poor Alfred
- Sam Theard as One-handed guy
- Mabel King as Madam Amy
- David Healy as Sam Bundler
- Samuel Fuller as Impresario
- Leon Charles as Liebling
- Fred Pinkard as Dr. Adams
- Delos V. Smith Jr. as Wallis
- Marcus Grapes as Rabin
- Denise Gordy as The Girl
- David Hubbard as Young Scott

== Production ==
The film was made as a TV movie that was to air on NBC as Motown Productions' first venture into dramatic television. However, the film was given a theatrical release instead after Universal Pictures executives thought it had box-office potential.

== Reception ==
After the film tested poorly in Phoenix, Arizona, but strongly in Washington, D.C., it was marketed primarily to black audiences.

A review in Variety stated, "Williams is fine, and the film has a lot of verve and intensity, but the story of Joplin's life is so grim it makes the film a real downer. Another problem is that the Motown Production was originally intended for TV, and shows it in the choppy episodic structure and corner-cutting production values."

Gene Siskel of the Chicago Tribune awarded 2 stars out of 4 and called it "a turgid film" consisting of "two Joplin successes and a whole mess of failures. Both successes come in the film's first 30 minutes ... From then on the film is a downer."

Hollie J. West of The Washington Post wrote, "The film was originally intended for television, and may wind up there yet. Lingering close-ups are plentiful, and the dramatic content fleshless and simplistic. As Joplin, Billy Dee Williams is believable. But he is ensnared in a screenplay which presents the greatest ragtime composer on only two levels: driven by a desire to become an accepted composer, and tormented by a crippling case of syphilis."
