= Sherri Chung =

American film composers

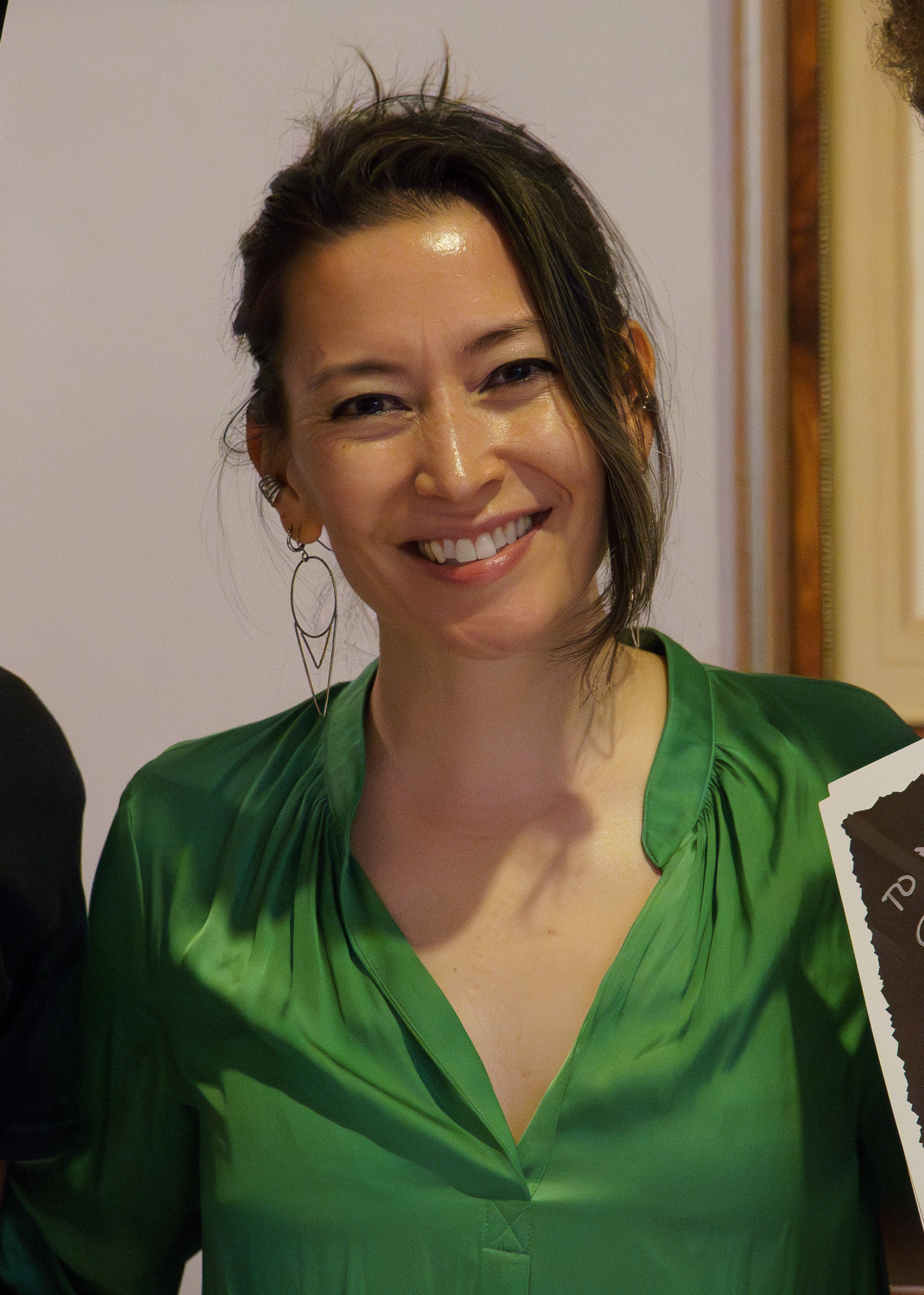
- Sherri Chung during the celebration of Málaga Film Festival

Background information
- Genres: Film score, video game music
- Occupations: Composer, conductor
- Instrument: Guitar
- Years active: 2010–present
- Website: sherrichung.com

Sherri Chung is an American film and television composer, pianist, vocalist, and songwriter. She has composed scores for television series including Gremlins: Secrets of the Mogwai, Based on a True Story, and Found, as well as films like Nancy Drew and the Hidden Staircase , Divorce In The Black and The Lost Husband which was nominated for Outstanding Original Score for an Independent Film at the Society of Composers & Lyricists Awards. In 2022, she became the first female elected as governor of the Music Branch Peer Group of the Television Academy.

Chung's composition for the documentary The Other Side of Home was shortlisted for Best Short Documentary at the 2017 Oscars. In 2024, she was nominated for the International Film Music Critics Association Award (IFMCA) Breakthrough Composer of the Year.

== Early life and education ==
Sherri Chung developed an interest in music during childhood and trained as a classical pianist. While in middle school, she became interested in composition after hearing Michael Kamen's score for the 1991 film Robin Hood: Prince of Thieves. She graduated from Jacksonville University in 2001 with a bachelor's degree in music composition and theory. After graduating from Jacksonville University, Chung completed graduate studies in the Scoring for Motion Pictures and Television program at the University of Southern California. While at USC, she met composer Blake Neely, with whom she later collaborated on several television projects.

== Career ==
Chung began her career in television, contributing music to animated series such as Family Guy and American Dad before moving into composing original scores. She later collaborated with composer Blake Neely on several series, including Supergirl, Arrow, and The Flash.

Her other television work includes composing for Riverdale, Batwoman, and Kung Fu. On Riverdale, she co-developed a distinctive musical style referred to as "swamp goth" for the character Gargoyle King, reflecting her approach to character-specific themes.

In 2023, Chung composed the original score for the Peacock series Based on a True Story, a dark comedy thriller created by Craig Rosenberg. She noted that the scoring approach focused on balancing the show's narrative shifts and character moments without overshadowing the dialogue. In 2024, her work included contributions to Gremlins: Secrets of the Mogwai, and the NBC series Found.

Chung's film work includes scores for Nancy Drew and the Hidden Staircase (2019), The Lost Husband (2020), and Divorce in the Black (2024). Her work on The Lost Husband earned her a nomination from the Society of Composers and Lyricists for Best Score for an Independent Studio Film. and the Netflix documentary series The Keepers. She has also released two original music albums and performs with her band in Los Angeles.

== Film scores ==
Year	Title	Director	Studio(s)	Notes
2017	Riverdale	Roberto Aguirre-Sacasa	Berlanti Productions; Archie Comics; WaterTower Music	TV series Composed with Blake Neely; soundtrack released by WaterTower Music
2019	Nancy Drew and the Hidden Staircase	Katt Shea	A Very Good Production; Red 56	Teen mystery comedy film soundtrack released by Warner Bros
2019	Batwoman	Caroline Dries	Berlanti Productions; DC Entertainment; Warner Bros. Television	TV series Composed with Blake Neely; soundtrack released by DC Entertainment
2020	The Lost Husband	Vicky Wight	Six Foot Pictures	TV series; soundtrack released by Quiver Distribution
2021	Kung Fu	Christina M. Kim	Berlanti Productions; Quinn's House (seasons 1–2); Kinga Productions (season 3); Warner Bros. Television	TV series; soundtrack released by The CW
2023	Based on a True Story	Craig Rosenberg	Overlook Productions; Aggregate Films; Universal Content Productions; Parasox	Posthumous release
2023	Gremlins: Secrets of the Mogwai	Tze Chun	Ambient Entertainment; Warner Bros. (Germany); Entertainment Film Distributors (United Kingdom); First Look International (United States)	Posthumous release; her second score for an animated series
2023	Found	Forest Whitaker	Berlanti Productions; Rock My Soul Productions; Universal Television; Warner Bros. Television	Posthumous release
2024	Divorce in the Black	Tyler Perry	Amazon MGM Studios; Tyler Perry Studios	Soundtrack released by Amazon MGM Studios

== Selected Discography ==
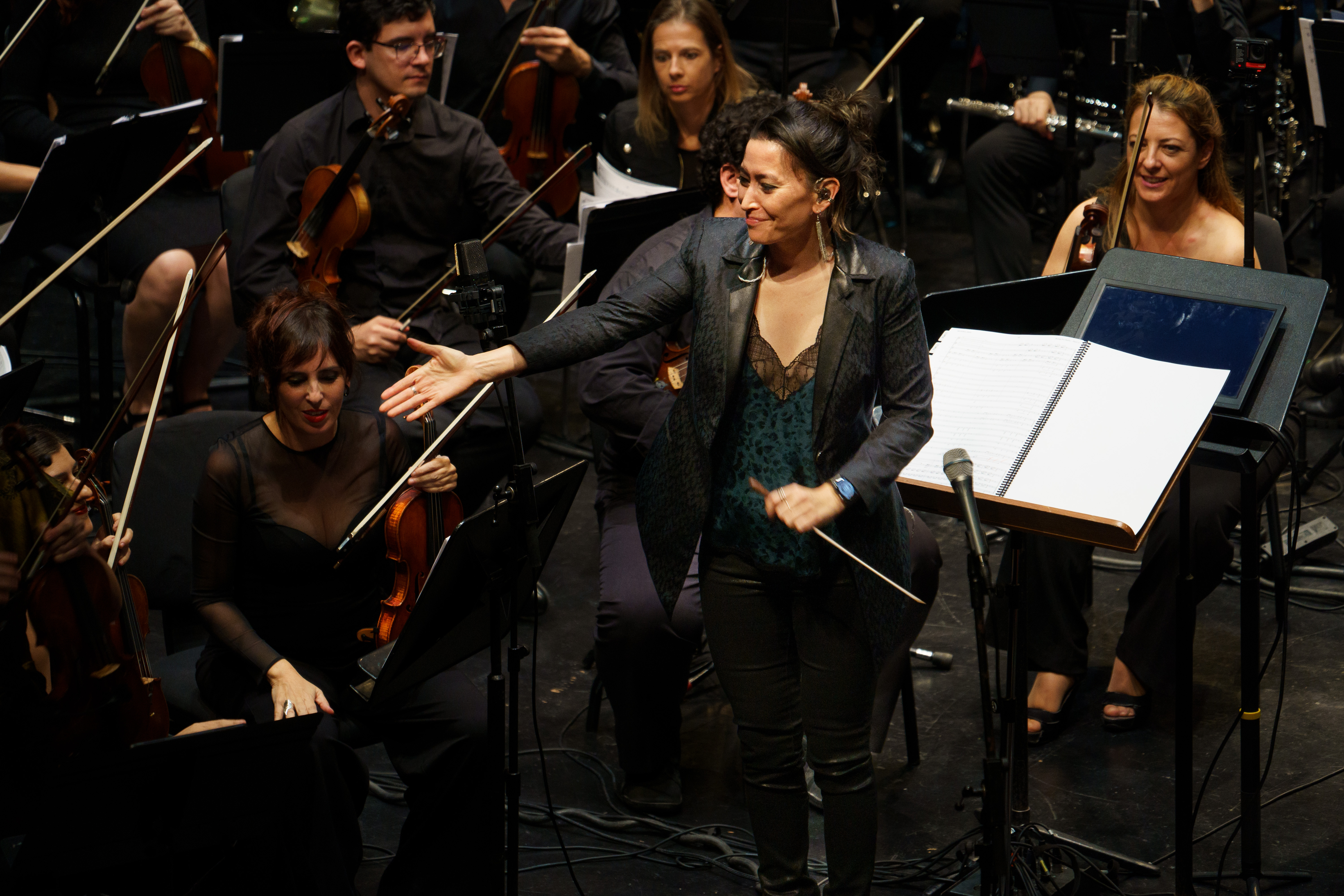
Sherri Chung with her band

Singles

- Not a Killer
- Like Romeo and Juliet
- I Was in Love once

== Awards and recognition ==
Year	Award	Category	Nominated work	Result	Ref
2017	Oscars Academy Awards	Best Short Documentary	The Other Side of Home	Nominated	
2021	Society of Composers & Lyricists Awards	Outstanding Original Score for an Independent Film	The Lost Husband	Nominated	
2024	International Film Music Critics Association Award (IFMCA)	Breakthrough Composer of the Year	The American Society of Magical Negroes	Nominated	
2025	Children's and Family Emmy Awards	Best Music Direction And Composition for An Animated Program	Gremlins: Secrets of the Mogwai	Nominated	
