= Animal House =

1978 comedy film by John Landis

- Theatrical release poster by Rick Meyerowitz
- Directed by: John Landis
- Written by: Harold Ramis; Douglas Kenney; Chris Miller
- Produced by: Matty Simmons; Ivan Reitman
- Starring: John Belushi; Tim Matheson; John Vernon; Verna Bloom; Thomas Hulce; Donald Sutherland; Karen Allen
- Cinematography: Charles Correll
- Edited by: George Folsey Jr.
- Music by: Elmer Bernstein
- Production company: Universal Pictures
- Distributed by: Universal Pictures
- Release date: July 28, 1978
- Running time: 109 minutes
- Country: United States
- Language: English
- Budget: $3 million
- Box office: $141.6 million

Animal House is a 1978 American teen sex comedy film directed by John Landis and written by Harold Ramis, Douglas Kenney and Chris Miller. It stars John Belushi, Tim Matheson, John Vernon, Verna Bloom, Thomas Hulce and Donald Sutherland. The film is about a trouble-making fraternity whose members challenge the authority of Dean Vernon Wormer of the fictional Faber College.

Produced by Matty Simmons of National Lampoon and Ivan Reitman for Universal Pictures, Animal House was inspired by stories written by Miller and published in National Lampoon, which were based on Ramis's experience in the Zeta Beta Tau fraternity at Washington University in St. Louis, Miller's Alpha Delta Phi experiences at Dartmouth College in Hanover, New Hampshire and producer Reitman's at McMaster University in Hamilton, Ontario, Canada.

Of the younger lead actors, only the 28-year-old Belushi was an established star but even he had not yet appeared in a film, having gained fame as an original cast member of Saturday Night Live, which was in its third season in the autumn of 1977. Several of the actors cast as college students, including Thomas Hulce, Karen Allen and Kevin Bacon, were just beginning their film careers. Matheson, cast as student Eric "Otter" Stratton, was already a seasoned actor, having appeared in movies and television since the age of 13.

Filming took place at the University of Oregon from October to December 1977. Following its initial release on July 28, 1978, Animal House received generally mixed reviews from critics, but Time and Roger Ebert proclaimed it one of the year's best. Filmed on a budget of just $3 million, the film earned an estimated gross of more than $141 million in the form of theatrical rentals and home video, not including merchandising, making it the highest-grossing comedy film of its time.

Animal House, along with The Kentucky Fried Movie (1977), also directed by Landis, were largely responsible for defining and launching the gross-out film genre, which became one of Hollywood's staples in the 1980s. Animal House is now regarded as one of the best comedy films of all time.

In 2001, the United States Library of Congress deemed National Lampoon's Animal House "culturally, historically, or aesthetically significant" and selected it for preservation in the National Film Registry. It was No. 1 on Bravo's "100 Funniest Movies". It was No. 36 on AFI's "100 Years... 100 Laughs" list of the 100 best American comedies. In 2008, Empire magazine selected it as No. 279 of "The 500 Greatest Movies of All Time".

== Plot ==
In 1962, Faber College freshmen Larry Kroger and Kent Dorfman are seeking to join a fraternity. Unwelcome at the exclusive Omega Theta Pi, the two visit the decrepit Delta Tau Chi house next door. Kent believes that Delta will have to accept him as a "legacy" since his brother was a member. They meet John ("Bluto") Blutarsky, chapter president Robert ("Hoov") Hoover, charismatic ladies' man Eric ("Otter") Stratton, Daniel Simpson ("D-Day") Day, suave Donald ("Boon") Schoenstein and Boon's exasperated girlfriend Katy. Larry and Kent are accepted as pledges and given the fraternity names "Pinto" and "Flounder", respectively. Meanwhile, Omega pledge Chip Diller is given a paddling as part of his initiation.

Delta house is on probation due to their shenanigans and overall poor academic scores. Wishing to remove the fraternity from Faber's campus, Dean Vernon Wormer places the Deltas on "double secret probation" and directs Greg Marmalard, the Omega president, to get fellow Omega and ROTC Cadet Commander Douglas C. Neidermeyer to find a reason to revoke Delta's charter. Various Delta misadventures ensue, including the accidental death of Neidermeyer's horse during a retaliatory prank following the abuse cadet Flounder receives from Neidermeyer.

Bluto and D-Day steal the answers to a midterm exam, unaware the Omegas replaced it with a fake. The Deltas all fail and their grade-point averages prompt Wormer to announce he needs only one more misdemeanor to revoke their charter and expel them. Meanwhile, corrupt Mayor Carmine DePasto demands money for the use of the main street for the college parade.

Undeterred, the Deltas organize a toga party and send Pinto and Flounder to shoplift from a supermarket. Pinto invites cashier Clorette to the party, unaware that she is Mayor DePasto's underage daughter, while Otter flirts with an older woman, who turns out to be Dean Wormer's alcoholic wife Marion. During the party, at which Otis Day and the Knights perform, Otter seduces Marion, while Pinto and Clorette make out until she passes out, drunk. Pinto resists the temptation to take advantage of her and instead delivers her home in a shopping cart.

Wormer organizes a kangaroo court which revokes the Deltas' charter. Otter, Boon, Pinto, and Flounder take a road trip in Flounder's brother's Lincoln Continental. Reading about the recent death of a student at a nearby all-girls college, Otter poses as Frank, her fiancé, to get dates for himself and the others. The Deltas and their dates go to a nightclub where Otis Day and the Knights are performing, unaware that the clientele is exclusively African-American. As Otter and his date, Shelly, are making out in the car, some of the patrons intimidate the other Deltas into abandoning their dates and fleeing, damaging Fred's car in their haste to leave.

The next morning, Boon discovers Katy has spent the night with English professor Dave Jennings. Babs Jansen, in love with Marmalard, informs him that Mandy and Otter had an affair; Marmalard has Babs lure Otter to a motel where she tells him Mandy is waiting; Marmalard, Niedermeyer and several other Omegas beat him up. Due to the Deltas' low midterm grades, Wormer expels Delta and tells the Deltas he has notified their local draft boards that they are now eligible for military service.

The Deltas are ready to concede defeat until Bluto rallies them into seeking revenge at the annual Homecoming parade. D-Day converts Flounder's Lincoln into an armored vehicle, which the Deltas conceal inside a cake-shaped breakaway parade float. The Deltas wreak havoc during the parade. As Hoover asks Wormer if it is possible to give the Deltas just one more chance, an epilogue reveals the fates of the characters:

- Hoover is a public defender in Baltimore, Maryland.
- Pinto is an editor for National Lampoon.
- Marmalard is a Richard Nixon White House aide who is raped in prison in 1974.
- Otter is a gynecologist in Beverly Hills, California.
- Neidermeyer is killed by his own troops during the Vietnam War.
- Flounder is a sensitivity trainer at Encounter Groups of Cleveland, Inc.
- D-Day's whereabouts are unknown.
- Boon and Katy marry in 1964 and divorce in 1969.
- Babs is a tour guide at Universal Studios, Hollywood.
- Bluto is a United States senator married to Mandy.

== Cast ==
=== Delta Tau Chi House ===
- John Belushi as John Blutarsky ("Bluto")
- Tim Matheson as Eric Stratton ("Otter")
- Thomas Hulce as Lawrence "Larry" Kroger ("Pinto")
- Peter Riegert as Donald Schoenstein ("Boon"), Otter's best friend
- Stephen Furst as Kent Dorfman ("Flounder")
- Bruce McGill as Daniel Simpson Day ("D-Day"), a chopper-riding biker
- Karen Allen as Katy
- James Widdoes as Robert Hoover ("Hoov"), the chapter president
- Douglas Kenney as Dwayne Storkman ("Stork")
- Christian Miller as Curtis Wayne Fuller ("Hardbar")

=== Omega Theta Pi House ===
- James Daughton as Gregory Marmalard
- Mark Metcalf as Douglas C. Neidermeyer
- Kevin Bacon as Chip Diller

=== Pi House ===
- Mary Louise Weller as Mandy Pepperidge, Marmalard's girlfriend and Bluto's love interest
- Martha Smith as Barbara Sue "Babs" Jansen, Mandy's fellow Pi house member

=== Others ===
- John Vernon as Dean Vernon Wormer
- Verna Bloom as Mrs. Marion Wormer
- Donald Sutherland as Dave Jennings, a pot-smoking English professor
- Cesare Danova as Carmine DePasto, the crooked mayor of the unnamed city where Faber is located
- Sarah Holcomb as Clorette DePasto, the mayor's daughter and Pinto's love interest.
- Lisa Baur as Shelly Dubinsky, Otter's date from Emily Dickinson College
- DeWayne Jessie as Otis Day, the lead singer of Otis Day and the Knights
- Robert Cray (uncredited) as bassist for Otis Day and the Knights

== Production ==
=== Development ===
Animal House was the first film produced by National Lampoon, the most popular humor magazine on college campuses in the mid-1970s. The periodical specialized in satirizing politics and popular culture. Many of the magazine's writers were recent college graduates, hence its appeal to students all over the country. Doug Kenney was a Lampoon writer and the magazine's first editor-in-chief. He was graduated from Harvard University in 1969 and had a college experience closer to the Omegas in the film, having been president of the university's elite Spee Club. Kenney was responsible for the first appearances of three characters that appeared in the film: Larry Kroger, Mandy Pepperidge and Vernon Wormer. They made their debut in 1973's National Lampoon's High School Yearbook, a satire of a Middle America 1964 high school yearbook. Kroger's and Pepperidge's characters in the yearbook were effectively the same as their characters in the movie, whereas Wormer was a P.E. and civics teacher as well as an athletic coach in the yearbook.

However, Kenney felt that fellow Lampoon writer Chris Miller was the magazine's expert on the college experience. Faced with an impending deadline, Miller submitted a chapter from his then-abandoned memoirs entitled The Night of the Seven Fires about pledging experiences from his fraternity days in Alpha Delta (associated with the national Alpha Delta Phi during Miller's undergraduate years; the fraternity subsequently disassociated itself from the national organization and is now called Alpha Delta) at Dartmouth College, in Hanover, New Hampshire. The antics of his fellow fraternities, coupled with experiences like that of a road trip to the University of Wisconsin–Madison and its Delta Chi fraternity, became the inspiration for the Delta Tau Chis of Animal House and many characters in the film (and their nicknames) were based on Miller's fraternity brothers. Filmmaker Ivan Reitman had just finished producing David Cronenberg's first film Shivers and called the magazine's publisher Matty Simmons about making movies under the Lampoon banner. Reitman had put together The National Lampoon Show in New York City featuring several future Saturday Night Live cast members, including John Belushi. When most of the Lampoon group moved on to SNL except for Harold Ramis, Reitman approached him with an idea to make a film together using some skits from the Lampoon Show.

=== Screenplay ===
Kenney met Lampoon writer Ramis at the suggestion of Simmons. Ramis drew from his own fraternity experiences as a member of Zeta Beta Tau fraternity at Washington University in St. Louis and was working on a film treatment about college called First Year but the magazine's editors were not happy with it. The famous scene of Bruce McGill as Daniel "D-Day" Day riding a motorcycle up the stairs of the fraternity house was inspired by Belushi's antics while a student at the University of Wisconsin–Whitewater. Kenney and Ramis started working on a new film treatment together, positing Charles Manson in a high school, calling it Laser Orgy Girls. Simmons disliked this idea so they changed the setting to a "northeastern college... Ivy League kind of school". Kenney was a fan of Miller's fraternity stories and suggested using them as a basis for a movie. Kenney, Miller and Ramis began brainstorming ideas. They saw the film's 1962 setting as "the last innocent year... of America", and the homecoming parade that ends the film as occurring on November 21, 1963, the day before the assassination of President John F. Kennedy; 1962 was also notable for being the year in which the 1973 film American Graffiti was set. They agreed that Belushi should star in it and Ramis wrote the part of John "Bluto" Blutarsky specifically for the comedian, having been friends with him while at Chicago's The Second City.

Ramis, Miller and Kenney were all new to screenwriting, so their film treatment ran to 110 pages, where most treatments average 15 pages. Reitman and Simmons pitched it to every Hollywood studio. Simmons met with Ned Tanen, an executive at Universal Pictures. He was encouraged by younger executives Sean Daniel and Thom Mount who were more receptive to the Lampoon type of humor; Mount had discovered the Seven Fires film treatment as Tanen's assistant while investigating projects left by a fired studio executive. Tanen hated the idea. Ramis remembers, "We went further than I think Universal expected or wanted. I think they were shocked and appalled. Chris' fraternity had virtually been a vomiting cult. And we had a lot of scenes that were almost orgies of vomit... We didn't back off anything". The writers eventually created nine drafts of the screenplay, and the studio gradually became more receptive to the project, especially Mount, who championed it. The studio greenlit the film and set the budget at a modest $3 million. Simmons remembers, "They just figured, 'Screw it, it's a silly little movie, and we'll make a couple of bucks if we're lucky—let them do whatever they want.'"

=== Casting ===
Initially, Reitman had wanted to direct but had made only one film, Cannibal Girls, for $5,000. The film's producers approached Richard Lester and Bob Rafelson before hiring John Landis, who got the director job based on his work on The Kentucky Fried Movie. That film's script and continuity supervisor Katherine Wooten was the girlfriend of Sean Daniel, an assistant to Mount. Daniel saw Landis' movie and recommended him. Landis then met with Mount, Reitman and Simmons and got the job. Landis remembered, "When I was given the script, it was the funniest thing I had ever read up to that time. But it was really offensive. There was a great deal of projectile vomiting and rape and all these things". Landis claims his big contribution to the film was that there "had to be good guys and bad guys. There can't just be bad guys, so there became a good fraternity and bad fraternity". There was also early friction between Landis and the writers because the director was a high-school dropout from Hollywood and they were all college graduates from the East Coast. Ramis recalled, "He sort of referred immediately to Animal House as 'my movie.' We'd been living with it for two years and we hated that". According to Landis, he drew inspiration from classic Hollywood comedies featuring the likes of Buster Keaton, Harold Lloyd and the Marx Brothers.

The initial cast was to feature Chevy Chase as Eric "Otter" Stratton, Bill Murray as Donald "Boon" Schoenstein, Brian Doyle-Murray as Robert "Hoov" Hoover, Dan Aykroyd as D-Day and John Belushi as Bluto but only Belushi was interested. Chase turned the film down in favor of Foul Play; Landis, who wanted to cast unknown dramatic actors such as Kevin Bacon and Karen Allen (the first film for both) instead of famous comedians, takes credit for subtly discouraging Chase by describing the cast to him as an "ensemble". Landis has also stated that he was not interested in directing a "Saturday Night Live movie" and that unknowns would be the better choice. The character of D-Day was based on Aykroyd, a motorcycle aficionado. Aykroyd was offered the part, but he was already committed to Saturday Night Live; according to Landis, the show's producer Lorne Michaels threatened to fire Aykroyd from the show's cast if he signed on to do the film. Ultimately, Bruce McGill was cast as D-Day and provided him with his breakthrough role. In August 2018, Aykroyd explained that although Michaels permitted him to do Animal House, he ultimately chose to stay behind on Saturday Night Live so as not to leave Michaels understaffed. Belushi, who had worked on The National Lampoon Radio Hour before Saturday Night Live, was also busy with SNL, but spent Monday through Wednesday making the film and then flew back to New York to do the show on Thursday through Saturday. Ramis originally wrote the role of Boon for himself but Landis felt that he looked too old for the part and Peter Riegert was cast instead. Landis offered Ramis a smaller part but he declined. Landis met with Jack Webb to play Dean Wormer and Kim Novak to play his wife Marion; at the time, Webb reportedly turned down the role because of concerns over his clean-cut Dragnet image, but later said he did not find the script funny. Landis had seen John Vernon in The Outlaw Josey Wales and liked his performance in the film, ultimately casting him as Dean Wormer.

Belushi initially received only $35,000 for Animal House but was paid a bonus after the film became a hit. Landis also met with Meat Loaf in case Belushi turned down the role of Bluto. Landis worked with Belushi on his character, who "hardly had any dialogue"; they decided that Bluto was a cross between Harpo Marx and the Cookie Monster. Belushi said he developed his ability to communicate without talking because his Albanian grandmother spoke little English.

At the time, Belushi was considered a supporting actor and Universal wanted another star. In 1969, Landis had been a crew member on the film Kelly's Heroes and had become friends with actor Donald Sutherland; Landis sometimes would babysit his son Kiefer. He had also just worked with him on The Kentucky Fried Movie. Landis asked Sutherland, one of the most popular film stars of the early 1970s, to be in the movie. For two days of work, Sutherland declined the initial offer of $20,000 plus "points" (a percentage of the gross or net income). Universal then offered him his day rate of $25,000 or 2% of the film's gross. Sutherland took the guaranteed fee, assuming that the film would not be very successful; although this made him the highest-paid member of the cast (Belushi and Douglas C. Neidermeyer (Mark Metcalf)'s horse Junior each received $40,000), the decision cost Sutherland what he estimates at around $14 million. The star's participation, however, was crucial; Landis later said "It was Donald Sutherland who essentially got the film made."

"Pinto", the nickname of Larry Kramer (Tom Hulce) in the film, was screenwriter Chris Miller's nickname at his Dartmouth fraternity. DeWayne Jessie, who played singer Otis Day, purchased the rights to the character name and formed a real-life band called Otis Day & The Knights. This band toured America for several years and released the album Shout in 1989. Robert Cray, played the bassist for Otis Day and the Knights. Although uncredited, Cray went on to be a successful blues vocalist and guitarist with his own band and ultimately wonfive Grammy Awards.

=== Locations ===
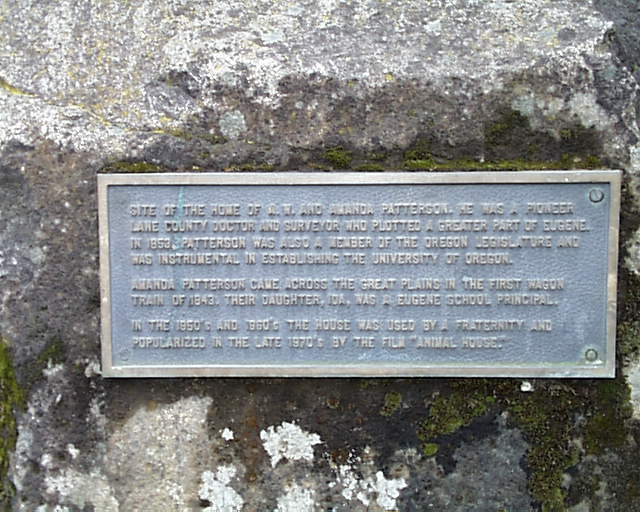
Plaque at the Delta House site (2007)

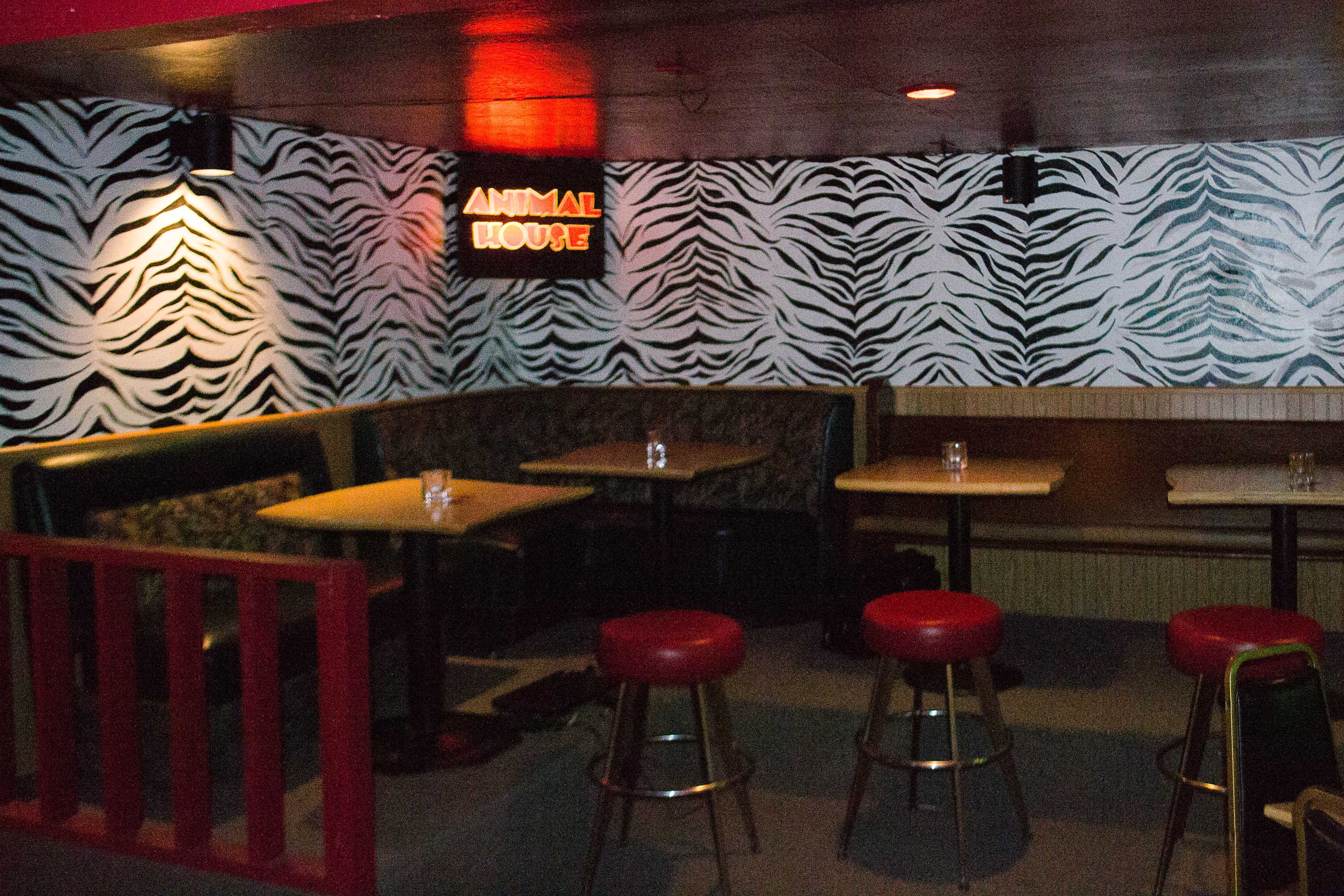
Otis Day and the Knights sang Shama Lama Ding Dong at the Dexter Lake Club (2012 photo)

The filmmakers' next problem was finding a college that would let them shoot the film on their campus. Because it was set in the past, they needed a location with a classic look, so submitted the script to several colleges and universities but "nobody wanted this movie" due to the script. According to Landis, "I couldn't find 'the look'. Every place that had 'the look' said, 'no thank you.'" The University of Missouri (Columbia, Missouri) gave consent to shoot the movie at the college, but President Herbert W. Schooling withdrew permission to film there after reading the script.

The president of the University of Oregon in Eugene, William Beaty Boyd, had been a senior administrator at the University of California, Berkeley in 1966 when his campus was considered for a location of the film The Graduate. After he consulted with other senior administrative colleagues who advised him to turn it down due to the lack of artistic merit, the college campus scenes set at Berkeley were shot at USC in Los Angeles. The film went on to become a classic and Boyd was determined not to make the same mistake twice when the producers inquired about filming in Oregon. After consulting with student government leaders and officers of the Pan Hellenic Council, the Director of University Relations advised the president that the script, although raunchy and often tasteless, was a very funny spoof of college life. Boyd even allowed the filmmakers to use his office as Dean Wormer's. Because of the film's content, however, he insisted that "Oregon" not be mentioned in the film. The filmmakers paid $20,000 to use the campus.

The actual house depicted as the Delta House was originally a residence near the campus in Eugene, the Dr. A.W. Patterson House. Around 1959, it was acquired by the Psi Deuteron chapter of Phi Sigma Kappa fraternity and was their chapter house until 1967, when the chapter was closed due to low membership. The house was sold, remained vacant, and slid into disrepair, with the spacious porch removed and the lawn graveled over. At the time of the shooting, the Phi Kappa Psi and Sigma Nu fraternity houses sat next to the old Phi Sigma Kappa house, on the 700 block of East 11th Avenue. The interior of the Phi Kappa Psi house and the Sigma Nu house were used for most of the interior scenes, but the scenes in Otter (Matheson) and Hoover's bedrooms were filmed on a soundstage. The Patterson house remained vacant after filming ended in 1977 and was demolished in 1986, despite some attempts to preserve it due to its connection to the film. The site (44.048°N 123.081°W) is now occupied by Bushnell University's School of Education and Counseling. A large boulder placed to the west of the parking entrance displays a bronze plaque commemorating the Delta House location. The concluding parade scene was filmed on Main Street in downtown Cottage Grove, about twenty miles (32 km) south of Eugene via Interstate 5.

=== Principal photography ===
Filming began at the University of Oregon on October 24, 1977 and concluded in mid-December 1977. Landis brought the actors who played the Deltas to Oregon five days before the start of production, to bond. Staying at the Rodeway Inn motel in adjacent Springfield, an old piano was moved from the lobby into McGill's room, which became known as "party central." James Widdoes, who played Hoover, remembers, "It was like freshman orientation. There was a lot of getting to know each other and calling each other by our character names." This tactic encouraged the actors playing the Deltas to separate themselves from the actors playing the Omegas, helping generate authentic animosity between them on camera. Belushi and his wife Judy rented a house in south Eugene to keep him away from alcohol and drugs; she remained in Oregon while he commuted to New York City for Saturday Night Live.

U of O students got haircuts to appear as extras. Not knowing the story, they were bemused to see a horse being led into Johnson Hall. Although the cast members were admonished against mixing with the college students, one night, some girls invited several of the cast to a fraternity party; assuming the invitation had been made with the knowledge of the fraternity, the actors arrived and were initially greeted coldly which soon turned to open hostility. It was obvious the group was not welcome, and as they were leaving, Widdoes threw a cup of beer at a group of drunk Oregon Ducks football players and a melee "like a scene from the movie" broke out. Tim Matheson, Bruce McGill, Peter Riegert and Widdoes narrowly escaped, with McGill suffering a black eye and Widdoes getting several teeth broken or knocked out.

Other than Belushi's opening yell, the food fight was filmed in one shot, with the actors encouraged to fight for real. Kent "Flounder" Dorfman (Stephen Furst)'s dexterous catching of flying groceries in the supermarket scene was another single shot; Furst deftly caught most of the grocery items Matheson and Landis rapidly threw at him from off camera, to the director's amazement. By filming the long student courtroom scene in one day, Landis won a bet with Reitman.

The film's budget was so small that during the 32 days of shooting in Eugene, mostly in November, Landis had no trailer or office and could not watch dailies for three weeks. His wife, Deborah Nadoolman, purchased most of the costumes at local thrift stores and she and Judy Belushi made the party togas. Landis and McGill staged a scene for reporters visiting the set where the director pretended to be angry at the actor for being difficult on the set. Landis grabbed a breakaway pitcher and smashed it over McGill's head. He fell to the ground and pretended to be unconscious. The reporters were completely fooled and when Landis asked McGill to get up, he refused to move.

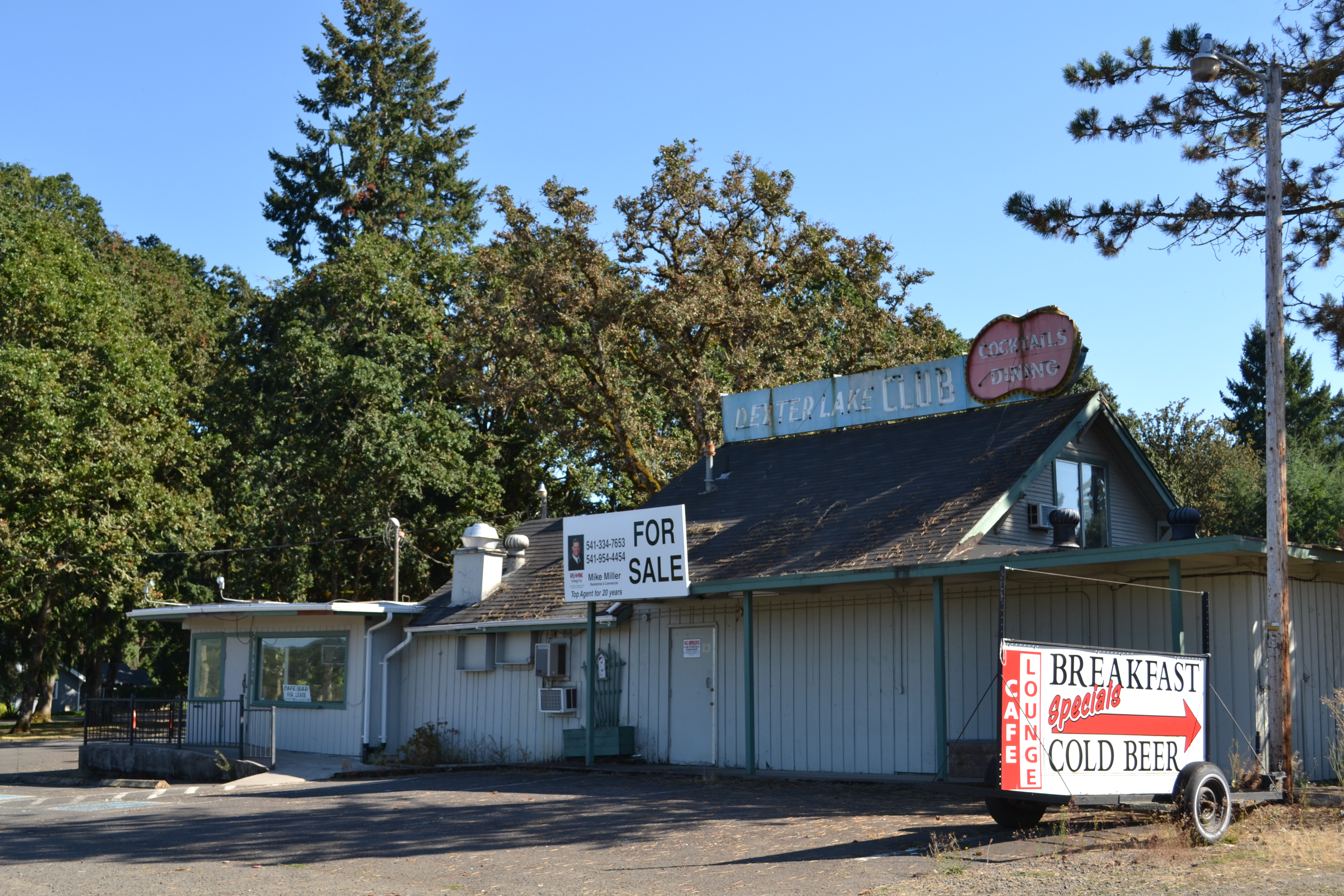
The closed Dexter Lake Club in 2011

Black extras had to be bused in from Portland for the segment at the Dexter Lake Club (43.914°N 122.8115°W) due to their scarcity around Eugene. More seriously, the segment alarmed Tanen and other studio executives, who perceived it as racist and warned that "'black people in America are going to rip the seats out of theaters if you leave that scene in the movie.'" Richard Pryor's approval helped retain the segment in the film. The studio became more enthusiastic about the film when Reitman showed executives and sales managers of various regions in the country a 10-minute production reel that was put together in two days. The reaction was positive and the studio sent 20 copies out to exhibitors. The first preview screening for Animal House was held in Denver four months before it opened nationwide. The crowd loved it and the filmmakers realized they had a potential hit on their hands.

The original cut of the movie was a lengthy 175 minutes and more than an hour was dropped; the deleted scenes included: a John Landis cameo as a cafeteria dishwasher who tries to stop Bluto from eating all the food. Landis is dragged across a table and thrown to the floor by Bluto who then says "You don't fuck with the eagles unless you know how to fly", a scene where Boon and Hoover tell Pinto the tales of legendary Delta House frat brothers from years before who had names like Tarantula, Bulldozer, Giraffe and his girlfriend, Gross Kay, two different deleted scenes with Otter and a couple of his girlfriends (one played by Sunny Johnson—listed in the credits as Otter's Co-Ed although her scene was deleted—and the other played by location scout Katherine Wilson, whose deleted scene can be seen in the theatrical trailer) and an extended version of the scene where Bluto pours mustard on himself and starts singing "I Am the Mustard Man."

== Soundtrack and score ==
Original Motion Picture Soundtrack: National Lampoon's Animal House

Soundtrack album by various artists
- Released: 1978
- Recorded: RCA Studios, New York and Sound Factory West, Hollywood
- Genres: Rock and roll, R&B, film score
- Length: 36:23
- Label: MCA
- Producer: Kenny Vance

The soundtrack is a mix of rock and roll and rhythm and blues with the original score created by film composer Elmer Bernstein, who had been a Landis family friend since John Landis was a child. Bernstein was easily persuaded to score the film, but he was not sure what to make of it. Similar to his preferring dramatic actors for the comedy, Landis asked Bernstein to score it as though it were serious. He adapted the "Faber College Theme" from the Academic Festival Overture by Johannes Brahms, and he said that the film opened yet another door in his diverse career — scoring comedies.

The soundtrack was released as an LP in 1978 and on compact disc in 1998. In the late 2000s, the very first song on the soundtrack, the "Faber College Theme", came to prominence due to its purported resemblance to the Bosnian national anthem.

Soundtrack album listing

Side one
No.	Title	Writer(s)	Performed by	Length
1.	"Faber College Theme"	Johannes Brahms, adapted by Elmer Bernstein	Elmer Bernstein	0:35
2.	"Louie Louie"	Richard Berry	John Belushi	2:56
3.	"Twistin' the Night Away"	Sam Cooke	Sam Cooke	2:39
4.	"Tossin' and Turnin'"	Ritchie Adams, Malou Rene	Bobby Lewis	2:49
5.	"Shama Lama Ding Dong"	Mark Davis	Lloyd Williams (Otis Day and the Knights)	2:48
6.	"Hey Paula"	Raymound Hildebrand	Paul & Paula	2:47
7.	"Animal House"	Stephen Bishop	Stephen Bishop	3:41

Side two
No.	Title	Writer(s)	Performed by	Length
1.	"Intro (The Riddle Song)"	Traditional	Stephen Bishop	0:49
2.	"Money (That's What I Want)"	Berry Gordy Jr., Janie Bradford	John Belushi	2:31
3.	"Let's Dance"	Jim Lee	Chris Montez	2:28
4.	"Dream Girl"	Stephen Bishop	Stephen Bishop	4:34
5.	"(What a) Wonderful World"	Sam Cooke, Herb Alpert, Lou Adler	Sam Cooke	2:06
6.	"Shout"	Ronald Isley, Rudolph Isley, O'Kelly Isley	Lloyd Williams (Otis Day and the Knights)	5:04
7.	"Faber College Theme"	Elmer Bernstein	Elmer Bernstein	1:16

Additional music in the film

- "Theme from A Summer Place", composed by Max Steiner; performed by Percy Faith and his Orchestra
- "Who's Sorry Now?", written by Ted Snyder, Bert Kalmar and Harry Ruby; performed by Connie Francis
- "The Washington Post March", composed by John Philip Sousa
- "Tammy", by Jay Livingston and Ray Evans

== Reception ==
=== Critical reception ===
At the time of its release, Animal House received mixed reviews but several prominent critics immediately acknowledged its appeal, and it has since been recognized as one of the best films of 1978. The film holds an 89% positive rating on the review aggregator website Rotten Tomatoes from 56 critics. Its consensus states, "The talents of director John Landis and Saturday Night Live's irrepressible John Belushi conspired to create a rambunctious, subversive college comedy that continues to resonate." On Metacritic, the film has a weighted average score of 79 out of 100 based on 13 reviews, indicating "generally favorable" reviews.

Roger Ebert gave the film four stars out of four and wrote, "It's anarchic, messy, and filled with energy. It assaults us. Part of the movie's impact comes from its sheer level of manic energy. ... But the movie's better made (and better acted) than we might at first realize. It takes skill to create this sort of comic pitch, and the movie's filled with characters that are sketched a little more absorbingly than they had to be, and acted with perception". Ebert later placed the film on his 10 best list of 1978, the only National Lampoon film to have received this honor. In his review for Time, Frank Rich wrote, "At its best it perfectly expresses the fears and loathings of kids who came of age in the late '60s; at its worst Animal House revels in abject silliness. The hilarious highs easily compensate for the puerile lows". Gary Arnold wrote in his review for The Washington Post, "Belushi also controls a wicked array of conspiratorial expressions with the audience... He can seem irresistibly funny in repose or invest minor slapstick opportunities with a streak of genius". David Ansen wrote in Newsweek, "But if Animal House lacks the inspired tastelessness of the Lampoon's High School Yearbook Parody, this is still low humor of a high order". Robert Martin wrote in The Globe and Mail, "It is so gross and tasteless you feel you should be disgusted but it's hard to be offended by something that is so sidesplittingly funny". Time magazine proclaimed Animal House one of the year's best.

When the film was released, Landis, Widdoes and Allen went on a national promotional tour. Universal Pictures spent about $4.5 million ($22,000,000 in today's money) promoting the film at selected college campuses and helped students organize their own toga parties. One such party at the University of Maryland attracted some 2,000 people, while students at the University of Wisconsin–Madison tried for a crowd of 10,000 people and a place in the Guinness Book of World Records. Thanks to the film, toga parties became one of the favorite college campus happenings during 1978 and 1979.

In 2000, the American Film Institute placed the film on its 100 Years...100 Laughs list, where it was ranked No. 36. In 2005, AFI ranked John "Bluto" Blutarsky's quote "Toga! Toga!" at No. 82 on its list of 100 Years...100 Movie Quotes. The New York Times placed the film on its Best 1000 Movies Ever Made list. In 2001, the Library of Congress deemed the film to be "culturally, historically, or aesthetically significant" and selected it as one of 25 films preserved in the National Film Registry that year. Animal House is first on Bravo's 100 Funniest Movies. In 2008, Empire magazine selected Animal House as one of The 500 Greatest Movies of All Time.

=== Box office ===
In its opening weekend, Animal House grossed $276,538 in twelve theaters in New York before expanding to 500 theaters. It grossed $120.1 million ($592,840,561 in today's money) in the United States and Canada in its initial release and went on to achieve a lifetime gross of $141.6 million, generating theatrical rentals of $70.8 million. It was the highest grossing comedy film until the release of Ghostbusters (which was also written by Ramis and produced by Reitman) and the seventh highest-grossing film of the 1970s. Adjusted for inflation, it is the 68th highest-grossing film in North America. Internationally, it did not do as well, earning rentals of only $9 million, for a worldwide total of $80 million.

== Spin-offs ==
The film inspired a short-lived half-hour ABC television sitcom, Delta House, in which Vernon reprised his role as the long-suffering, malevolent Dean Wormer. The series also included Furst as Flounder, McGill as D-Day and Widdoes as Hoover. The pilot episode was written by the film's screenwriters, Kenney, Miller and Ramis. Michelle Pfeiffer made her acting debut in the series playing a new character, Bombshell, and Peter Fox was cast as Otter. Belushi's character from the film, John "Bluto" Blutarsky, is in the Army, but his brother, Blotto, played by Josh Mostel, transfers to Faber to carry on Bluto's tradition.

Animal House inspired Co-Ed Fever, another sitcom, but without the involvement of the film's producers or cast. Set in a dormitory of the formerly all-female Baxter College, the pilot episode of Co-Ed Fever was aired by CBS on February 4, 1979, but the network canceled the series without airing any more episodes. NBC also had its Animal House-inspired sitcom, Brothers and Sisters, in which three members of Crandall College's Pi Nu fraternity interact with members of the Gamma Iota sorority. Like ABC's Delta House, Brothers and Sisters lasted only three months.

The film's writers planned a film sequel set in 1967 — the so-called "Summer of Love" — in which the Deltas have a reunion for Pinto's marriage in the Haight-Ashbury neighborhood of San Francisco. The only Delta to have become a hippie is Flounder, who is now called Pisces. Later, Chris Miller and John Weidman, another Lampoon writer, created a treatment for this screenplay, but Universal rejected it, because More American Graffiti, which contained some hippie-1967 sequences, had not done well. When John Belushi died, the idea was indefinitely shelved.

A second attempt at a sequel was made in 1982 with producer Matty Simmons co-authoring a script that saw some of the Deltas returning to Faber College five years after the events of the film. The project got no further than a first draft script.

== Home media ==
Animal House was released on videodisc in 1979. It was released on VHS in 1980, 1983, 1988 and 1990. In 1992, it was released in a 2-pack VHS set that included The Blues Brothers. It was first released on DVD in February 1998 in a "bare bones" full screen presentation. A 20th anniversary widescreen collector's edition DVD and a coinciding THX special edition VHS and a widescreen signature collection LaserDisc was released later that year, with a 45-minute documentary titled The Yearbook — An Animal House Reunion by producer J.M. Kenny, with production notes, theatrical trailer, and new interviews with director Landis, writers Harold Ramis and Chris Miller, composer Elmer Bernstein, and stars Tim Matheson, Karen Allen, Stephen Furst, John Vernon, Verna Bloom, Bruce McGill, James Widdoes, Peter Riegert, Mark Metcalf and Kevin Bacon.

In 2000, the collector's edition DVD was packaged along with The Blues Brothers and 1941 in a John Belushi 3-pack box set. The double secret probation edition DVD released in 2003 features cast members reprising their respective roles in a "Where Are They Now?" mockumentary, which posited the original film as a documentary. One major change shown in this mockumentary from the epilogue of the original film is that Bluto went on from his career in the U.S. Senate to become the President of the United States, with a voiceover on a shot of the north portico of the White House, since by then Belushi had died. This DVD also includes "Did You Know That? Universal Animated Anecdotes", a subtitle trivia track, the making of a documentary from the collector's edition, MxPx "Shout" music video, a theatrical trailer, production notes, and cast and filmmakers biographies. The DVD was also available in both widescreen and full-Screen formats. In August 2006, the film was released on an HD DVD/DVD combo disc, which featured the film in a 1080p high-definition format on one side and a standard-definition format on the opposite side. Along with the film Unleashed, Animal House was one of Universal's first two HD/DVD combo releases, but was later discontinued in 2008 after Universal decided to switch to the Blu-ray optical disc format following the conclusion of the high-definition optical disc format war. It became available on Blu-ray optical disc on July 26, 2011.The film was released on 4K on May 18, 2021.

== Legacy ==
Animal House was a great box office success despite its limited production costs and started an industry trend, inspiring other comedies such as Porky's, the Police Academy films, the American Pie films, Up the Academy (made by rival humor magazine MAD) and Old School, among others. Belushi became one of the most successful male comedy stars in the world until his 1982 death; Bacon also became a star, and he, Matheson and Allen are among those who have had lengthy acting careers. Hulce went on to get nominated for an Academy Award for Best Actor for his performance in Amadeus (1984), Reitman, Landis and Ramis became successful filmmakers; Landis' use of dramatic actors and soundtrack to make the comedy believable became the traditional approach for film comedies.

The film has caused many parents to worry about their children joining fraternities and sororities. One writer suggested, half-seriously, that the film's impact was such that future college students seeking to emulate Delta House's antics in real life led to "a drop of American college students' GPA's an average of .18 grade points, per semester".

On the left-wing and counterculture side, the film included references to topical political matters like President Harry S. Truman's decision to drop atomic bombs on Hiroshima and Nagasaki, Richard Nixon, the Vietnam War and the civil rights movement. Precursors of this counterculture subversive humor in the film were two non-"college movies", M*A*S*H, a 1970 satirical dark comedy, and The Kentucky Fried Movie, a 1977 formless comedy consisting of a series of sketches (which was also directed by Landis). At the start of Twilight Zone: The Movie (1983), also directed by John Landis, a scene set in Vietnam includes a soldier saying "I told you guys, we shouldn't have shot Lieutenant Neidermeyer."

Twisted Sister lead singer Dee Snider has cited the movie to be one of his favorites. Several references to the movie are included in two Twisted Sister music videos in 1984: "We're Not Gonna Take It" and "I Wanna Rock". Both music videos feature Mark Metcalf, playing a stern authority figure with a personality similar to Neidermeyer. In "We're Not Gonna Take It", Metcalf plays a stern father named Douglas C., who gives his rebellious son (Dax Callner) a dressing-down, in a manner similar to Neidermeyer does to Flounder during the cadet inspection, including calling him "worthless and weak". In "I Wanna Rock", Metcalf plays a teacher, who confronts a student for having a Twisted Sister logo drawn on his textbook, saying "What kind of a man desecrates a defenseless textbook? I've got a good mind to slap your fat face!", echoing Neidermeyer's line "What kind of man hits a defenseless animal? I've got a good mind to smash your fat face in!" At the end of the video, he crawls into the office of the principal, played by fellow Animal House actor Stephen Furst, who reprises one of his lines from the movie "Oh boy, is this great!"

In the second season of the Canadian television series Relic Hunter (2000–2001), Sydney Fox (Tia Carrere)'s boss at Trinity College is named Dean Wormer (William Pappas and Joseph Ziegler). In 2006, Miller wrote a more comprehensive memoir of his experiences in Dartmouth's AD house in a book entitled, The Real Animal House: The Awesomely Depraved Saga of the Fraternity That Inspired the Movie, in which Miller recounts hijinks that were considered too risqué for the movie.

The Cinemax softcore porn series Co-Ed Confidential, which aired From 2007 to 2010, is largely based on Animal House.

In 2012, Universal Pictures Stage Productions announced it was developing a stage musical version of the movie. Barenaked Ladies were originally announced to write the score, but they were replaced by composer David Yazbek. Casey Nicholaw was billed to direct and author Michael Mitnick was reported to be involved.

The University of Oregon celebrates its participation in the film. It offers visitors a guide to filming locations and the Knight Library has a collection of material on the film's production. Between the third and fourth quarter of every football game at Autzen Stadium, "Shout" from the toga party scene is played, to which the entire stadium sings along.

== See also ==
- Revenge of the Nerds (1984), another comedy film about college students going up against another fraternity.

== Bibliography ==
- Hoover, Eric (2008) "'Animal House' at 30: O Bluto, Where Art Thou?", Chronicle of Higher Education, v55 n2 pA1 Sep 2008
- Daniel P. Franklin (2006). Politics and film: the political culture of film in the United States, pp. 133–4
- Tucciarone, Krista M. (2007). "Cinematic College: 'National Lampoon's Animal House' Teaches Theories of Student Development". College Student Journal. 41 (4). Archived from the original on March 25, 2011 – via FindArticles.
- Patterson, Joanna (November 9, 2006). "Miller '63 Reveals the Real History of 'Animal House'". The Dartmouth. Dartmouth College. Archived from the original on January 7, 2008.
