= Burroughs, Georgia =

Town in Georgia, USA

Coordinates: 31°58′30″N 81°14′51″W

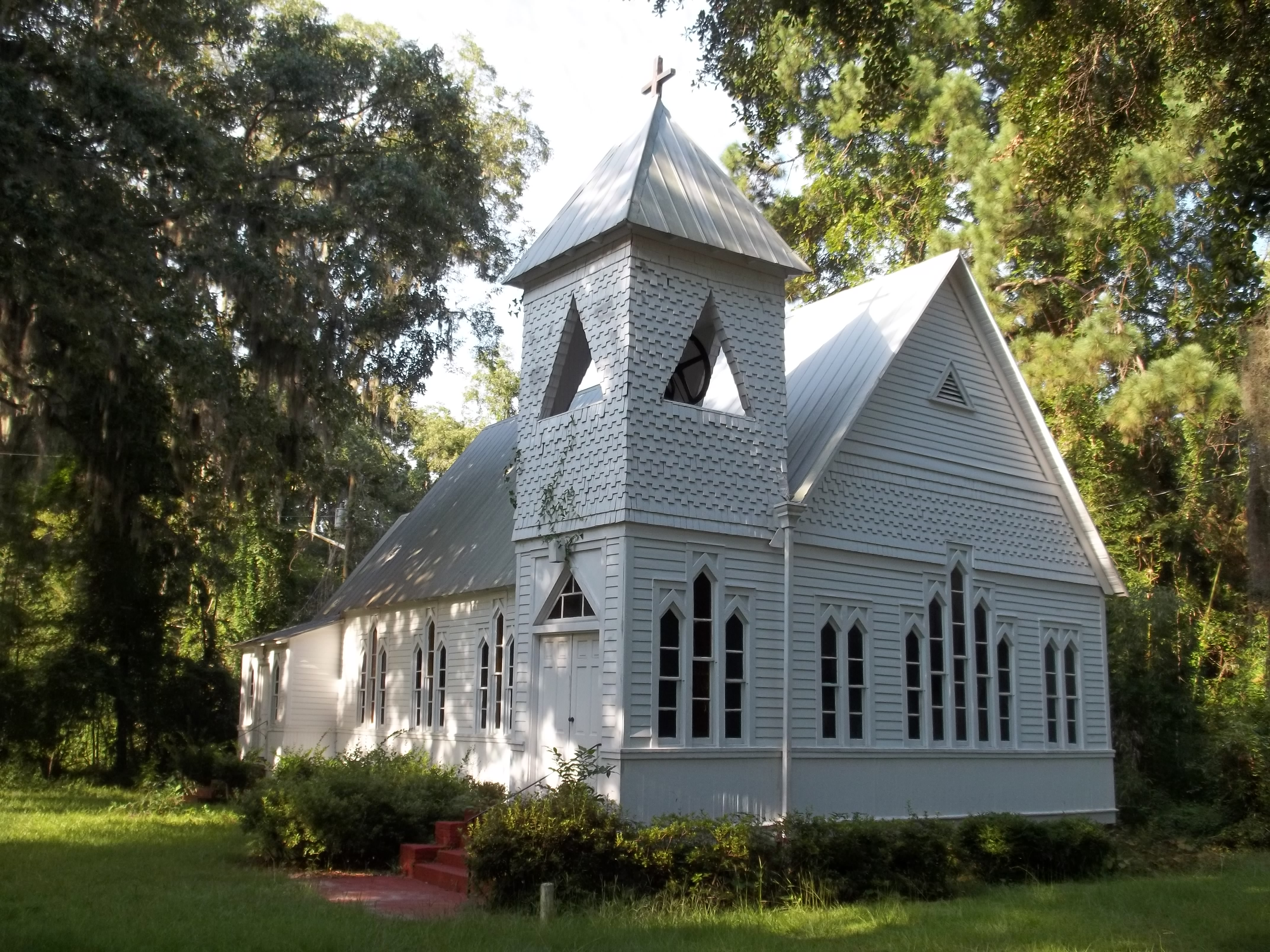
St. Bartholomew’s Episcopal Church

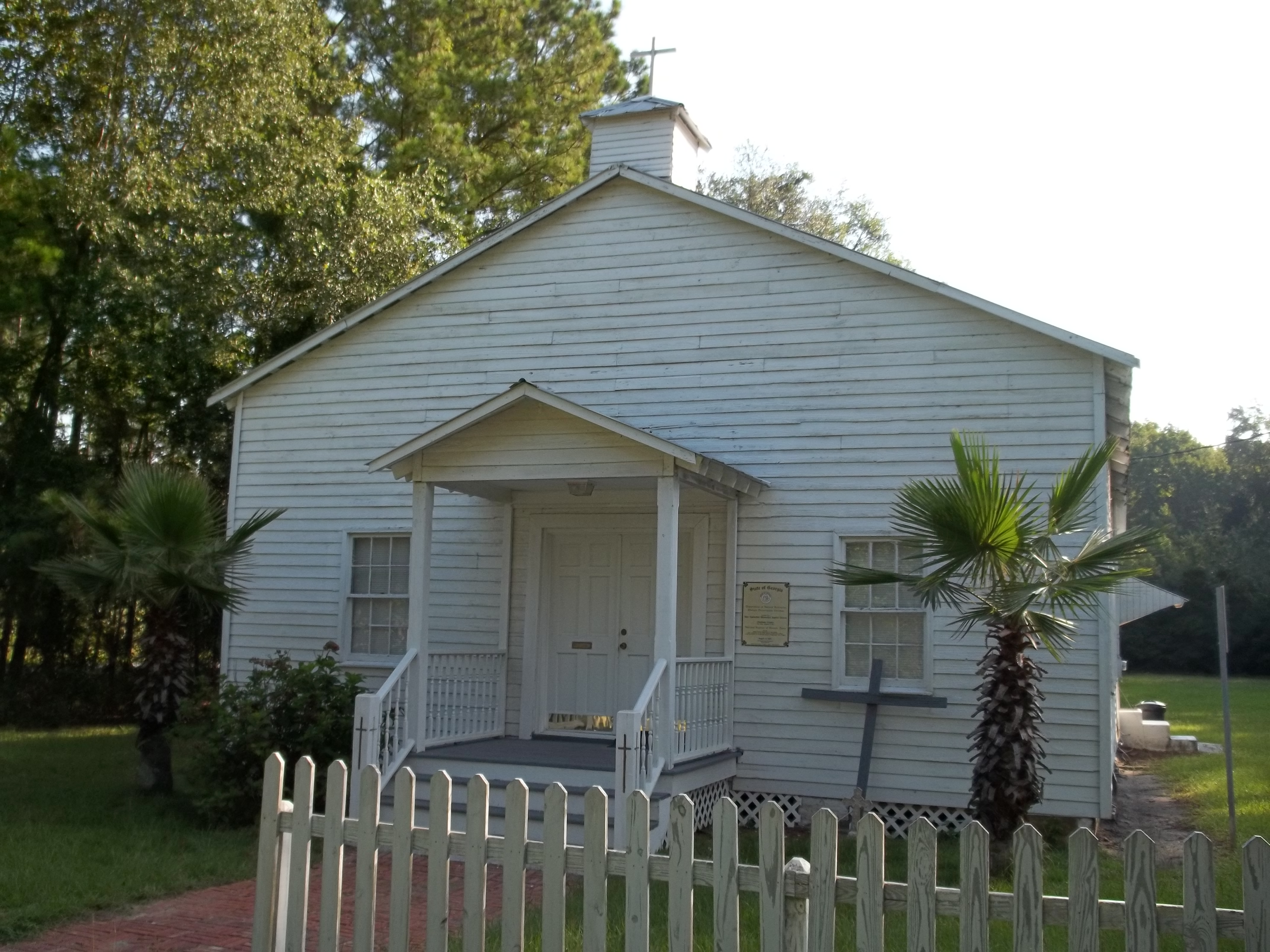
New Ogeechee Missionary Baptist Church

Burroughs is a populated place established as a town in Chatham County, Georgia by former slaves. In 1906, it was described as a post-village near the Ogeechee River about 12 miles southwest of Savannah. It had a population of 118 in 1900. The town was chartered in 1898 and had its charter revoked in 1921. It is now a neighborhood of Savannah.

Burroughs is home to the historic St. Bartholomew’s Episcopal Church and New Ogeechee Missionary Baptist Church. J. C. Legree was its first mayor. Henry Alexander Saturnin Hartley was a missionary to the area.

The Atlantic Coast Line Railroad passed through Burroughs. There was a Burroughs Station. In 1993 a filing was made to remove a train station stop in Burroughs. The area has artesian wells. There is a Burroughs Neighborhood Park.

== See also ==
- National Register of Historic Places listings in Chatham County, Georgia
