= Band of Oz =

American beach music band

- Origin: Greenville, North Carolina, United States
- Genres: Beach music; soul; R&B
- Years active: 1967–present
- Label: Surfside Records
- Members: Keith Houston; Chuck French; David Hicks; Daniel Morris; Chris Jennings; Dustin Ahkuoi; Jody Bundy
- Website: bandofoz.com

The Band of Oz is a prominent band of the United States beach music genre. Starting in the mid-1960s with high school students, the band turned professional in the early-1970s with a core group mostly from the Greenville, North Carolina Rose High School Stage Band, that featured Chuck French on trumpet, Gary Warren saxophone, Randy Hignite keyboards, Jim Heidenreich drums, Johnnie Byrd bass, Buddy Johnson vocals and Keith Houston guitar. In 1971 Billy Bazemore replaced Johnson.

In 1978, the group recorded and released their first single "Shaggin". This was followed by "Star of My Life" in 1979, and national radio airplay. They performed 200 to 300 shows per year throughout the 1980s amidst massive personnel restructuring. In 1995 they released the hit single "Shama Lama Ding Dong", the People's Choice Song of the Year at that year's Cammy Awards, and one of the most requested beach songs of all time.

In 1997, the band was inducted into the Beach Music Hall of Fame.

== Personnel ==
- Keith Houston: guitar, bass (1967–present)
- Chuck French: trumpet & lead vocals (1970–present)
- David Hicks: drums (1976–present)
- David Franks: keyboards, harmonica, vocals (October 1983-19??, 1999–2022)
- Jody Bundy: Keyboards & lead vocals (2022–present)
- Daniel Morris: saxophone & vocals (2005–present)
- Tim Morris: trumpet & lead vocals (2005–2022)
- Dustin Ahkuoi: lead vocals (2019–present)
- Chris Jennings: guitar, vocals (2019–present)
- Jerry West: guitar, lead vocals (1996-1997, 1999–2019)
- Scott Fine: vocals, trombone (2005–2017)
- Doug Winstead: vocals, trombone, trumpet (1990-1991, 2022-2026)
- Rick Strickland: bass, vocals (1997?-1999)
- "Big" John Thompson: bass, lead vocals (1980–1996)
- Johnny Byrd: bass (1967-before 1976)
- Shep Fields: bass
- Thomas "Butch" Barnes: saxophone & vocals (1980–1985, 1991-April 2005)
- Chris Keaton: saxophone, vocals (1984-1988)
- Bob Lynch: saxophone (by 1976-1980)
- Roland Colsen: saxophone (1975–76)
- Charlie Satterwhite: saxophone (1975–76)
- Gary Warren: saxophone (1970-by 1976)
- Rick Brogden: keyboards (1995)
- Rick Sanders: keyboards (?-1995-?)
- Mickey Hardie: keyboards (19??-October 1983)
- Ronnie Forbes: keyboards & vocals (1976-19??)
- Randy Hignite: keyboards 1969-1976
- Barry Kearney: bass (1973–74)
- Jim Heidenreich: drums (1970-before 1976)
- Billy Bazemore: vocals (1971–1985)
- Buddy Johnson: vocals (1967–1971)
- Jimmy Smith: horns (1967-by 1970)
- Freddy Tripp: horns (1967-by 1970)

== Discography ==
=== Albums ===
- Beach Beat Classics (1980): LP compilation
- Keep Keepin' It Up (1983): LP
- Let It Roll (January 1995): CD
- One More Step (August 1997): CD
- Beach Beat Classics (1998): CD compilation
- Dancing In The Street (March 1999): CD
- The Early Years (August 2003): CD
- Dance to the Radio
- Live by Request (2013)
- One's You Might Have Missed (2017)

=== Singles ===
- Shaggin' (1978)
- Reputation (1978)
- Star of My Life (1979)
- Got You Into My Life (1980)
- Hot Fun in the Summertime (1981)
- Lipstick Traces (1981)
- Ocean Boulevard (1982)
- Super Summer (1982)
- Southern Belles (1983)
- Good Time Music (1983)
- When Love Is New (1984)
- Keep Keepin' It Up (1984)
- Over the Rainbow (1986)
- Always Be My Girl (1986)
- Too Hot to Handle (1987)
- One More Step to Take (1987)
- Snap Your Fingers (1989)
- Rescue Me (1989)
- Love Sickness (1992)
- You'll Never Walk Alone (1992)
- Shama Lama Ding Dong (1995)
