= Welcome Home Roscoe Jenkins =

- Theatrical release poster
- Directed by: Malcolm D. Lee
- Written by: Malcolm D. Lee
- Produced by: Scott Stuber; Mary Parent; Charles Castaldi
- Starring: Martin Lawrence; Margaret Avery; Joy Bryant; Louis C.K. Michael Clarke Duncan; Mike Epps; Mo'Nique; Nicole Ari Parker; Cedric the Entertainer; James Earl Jones
- Cinematography: Greg Gardiner
- Edited by: George Bowers; Paul Millspaugh
- Music by: David Newman
- Production companies: Spyglass Entertainment; Runteldat Entertainment; Stuber/Parent Productions
- Distributed by: Universal Pictures
- Release date: February 8, 2008
- Running time: 118 minutes
- Country: United States
- Language: English
- Budget: $27–35 million
- Box office: $43.6 million

Welcome Home Roscoe Jenkins is a 2008 American comedy film written and directed by Malcolm D. Lee. The film stars Martin Lawrence, Nicole Ari Parker, Margaret Avery, Michael Clarke Duncan, Mike Epps, Mo'Nique, Cedric the Entertainer, Louis C.K., and James Earl Jones. The film revolves around a talk-show host having to confront both his Southern roots and entire family during his parents' wedding anniversary. Welcome Home Roscoe Jenkins was released by Universal Pictures on February 8, 2008 and garnered negative reviews from critics, commending the cast's efforts but relied heavily on lowbrow slapstick, while grossing $43.6 million against a $27–35 million budget.

== Plot ==
Dr. R.J. "Roscoe" Stevens (real name Roscoe Jenkins) is a successful talk-show host, who not only has millions of fans but has discarded his awkward Southern roots, and is engaged to Survivor winner Bianca Kittles.

Bringing Bianca and his 10-year-old son Jamaal to his sleepy Southern hometown for his parents' 50th wedding anniversary (to which Roscoe reluctantly agreed to attend), R.J. is determined to prove he is no longer the walking disaster his family used to pick on. In Georgia, he is met by his pickpocketing cousin Reggie, accompanied by his girlfriend Amy; and arrives at the family home to greet his parents, Roscoe Sr. and Mama Jenkins; his brother Otis, the town sheriff; Otis' wife Ruthie and their overgrown kids, Junior and Callie; and Roscoe's rowdy sister Betty. Roscoe's cousin Clyde drops in, reigniting their past competitiveness, and escorting Lucinda, Roscoe's past love interest. Having spent nearly nine years away from his family, Roscoe attempts to impress his family and friends with his newfound wealth and success but fails.

Throughout his stay, Roscoe endures much self-humiliation: he accidentally hits his mother in the head with a softball during a game, is beaten up by Otis and Betty after insulting them, faces constant blackmail by Reggie, inadvertently ruins the family fish fry by getting into a physical fight with Clyde, and is sprayed by a skunk while sleeping. It becomes obvious that he still holds a grudge against his father for showing Clyde preferential treatment when they were younger, while Roscoe Sr. resents his son for changing his name and distancing himself from his family. Bianca does not fit in well with the Jenkins, and Roscoe and Lucinda get reacquainted.

On the Jenkins' anniversary, the whole family gathers for their traditional obstacle course. Roscoe and Clyde aggressively make their way through, hurting themselves and others. When Roscoe begins to help his son over an obstacle, Bianca yells at him to leave Jamaal so he can defeat Clyde and he does, to his parents' shock. Roscoe and Clyde race to the finish line, and Roscoe wins (just as he did 20 years ago). As Bianca cheers, Roscoe berates his family, reminding them that it is all about "the team of me".

The family is angered by Roscoe's arrogant behavior and Jamaal refuses to go near his father, with Roscoe Sr. reprimanding his son for his behavior. Unable to contain his resentment, Roscoe lashes out at his father, saying that although Clyde's father died, Roscoe feels as though he had lost his own father because of his favoritism toward Clyde, and chastises him for always crediting Clyde's accomplishments while never acknowledging any of Roscoe's success. Stunned by this admission, Roscoe Sr. walks away guiltily, realizing he is the reason Roscoe left and stayed away for the past years. Finally realizing why Roscoe resented him for all this time, Clyde admits he never wanted to take Roscoe's place, and that his competitive nature was his way of trying to fit in and be accepted by the family. He also admits that he sees Roscoe as his brother. He tries to shake Roscoe's hand, but Bianca rebuffs him, and Roscoe, ashamed of his actions, leaves with Bianca and Jamaal, but not before his mother reminds him that his family still loves him.

Driving to the airport, Bianca proposes not inviting the family to their wedding. Roscoe seems to agree, upsetting Jamaal, who proudly declares himself a Jenkins. Bianca continues to insult the Jenkins clan, but upon arriving to the airport, Roscoe dumps her and her luggage, having seen Bianca's true colors. Roscoe and Jamaal return to the family home with Bianca's Pomeranian Fifi, who had pursued a relationship with the Jenkins’ over-aged Labrador Bucky.

During the anniversary celebration, Clyde cries during his speech for Mama and Papa Jenkins, admitting how much he cares about Roscoe and the family for taking him in after losing his parents. Roscoe then appears, thanking the family for helping him realize his love for them, and congratulates his parents. Roscoe Sr. apologizes to his son for his mistreatment of him over the years, the two finally make amends, and Roscoe finally asks Lucinda to dance. After the celebration, the family watches a video of the celebration on a big-screen TV while Roscoe and Lucinda depart to make love, discovering when they enter the bedroom that the dogs Bucky and Fifi had intercourse, too before getting them out. During the credits, Roscoe interviews his family on his show, renamed The Roscoe Jenkins Show.

== Cast ==
- Martin Lawrence as Dr. RJ Stevens/Roscoe Steven Jenkins Jr.: a famous talk show host.
- Joy Bryant as Bianca Kittles: a former Survivor contestant and R.J.'s fiancé.
- James Earl Jones as Roscoe Steven "Papa" Jenkins Sr.: Roscoe's father and patriarch of the Jenkins family.
- Margaret Avery as "Mama" Jenkins: Roscoe's mother and matriarch of the Jenkins family.
- Mike Epps as Reginald "Reggie" Jenkins: Roscoe's cousin.
- Mo'Nique as Betty Jenkins: RJ's younger sister.
- Cedric the Entertainer as Clyde Stubbs: RJ's wealthy cousin and nemesis.
- Nicole Ari Parker as Lucinda Allen: RJ's childhood crush, and later, his new wife.
- Michael Clarke Duncan as Otis Jenkins: RJ and Betty's older brother.
- Liz Mikel as Ruthie Jenkins: Otis's wife.
- Brooke Lyons as Amy: Reggie's girlfriend.
- Louis C.K. as Marty: RJ's agent.
- Affion Crockett as Dayquan.
- Damani Roberts as Jamaal Jenkins: Roscoe's son and Lucinda's stepson.
- Brandin Jenkins as Otis "Junior" Jenkins Jr.: Otis & Ruthie's son.
- Krystal Marea Braud as Callie Jenkins: Otis & Ruthie's daughter.

== Production ==
Welcome Home Roscoe Jenkins was filmed in Shreveport, Louisiana and Minden, Louisiana.

== Box office ==
In its opening weekend at the North American box office, the film grossed $16.2 million USD, opening at #2 behind Fool's Gold.

Director Malcolm D. Lee blamed the box office performance on the "terrible title" and shared he had preferred the title Southern Discomfort, but the film's marketing team settled on Welcome Home Roscoe Jenkins.

== Reception ==
Welcome Home Roscoe Jenkins received negative reviews from critics. On the review aggregator website Rotten Tomatoes, 23% of 83 critics' reviews are positive, with an average rating of 4.5/10. The website's consensus reads: "Welcome Home Roscoe Jenkins has moments of comic inspiration – and long stretches of overdone slapstick." Metacritic, which uses a weighted average, assigned the film a score of 46 out of 100, based on 23 critics, indicating "mixed or average" reviews.

Rolling Stone's Peter Travers criticized Lee for getting his cast to perform "crass routines that should have gone out with minstrel shows." Josh Rosenblatt of The Austin Chronicle was surprised by Lawrence's attempt at being the film's "quiet center" and "soul of endearing insecurity" in the title role but felt it gets bogged down by lowbrow humor, concluding that "it's capable at times of real subtlety [and] warmth and humanity but not confident enough in itself to stay away from fart jokes or empty acts of sassiness for very long." Nick Schager of Slant Magazine felt the script contained false conflicts and "narrative staleness" throughout the plot but gave Lee credit for allowing Lawrence and his co-stars to "play to their strengths," saying they "help enliven what's otherwise simply another soggy family reunion melodrama". Elizabeth Weitzman of the New York Daily News said, "Although Lee relies on too many lame gross-out jokes, this cast does know how to have fun - which may come as welcome relief to audiences desperate for laughs during a cold month at the movies." The A.V. Club's Scott Tobias gave the film a "C+" grade. He commended Lee for taking Tyler Perry's formula to make it "less jarring and more palatable" for viewers and giving his supporting cast enough room to deliver their own material (singling out Mo'Nique as "a surprising standout"), but was critical of Lawrence's "sub-Eddie Murphy hijinks" and overuse of slapstick with various humans and animals, concluding that "In other words, it's about as good as a movie featuring gratuitous Pomeranian-humping could possibly be."

== Home media ==
The film was released on DVD in the United States on June 17, 2008, and in the United Kingdom on May 30, 2008.
