= The Sistuhs =

- Original language: English
- Written by: Saundra Pearl Sharp
- Genre: Drama, musical

Premiere
- Date: 1979
- Place: Park's Marx Theatre

The Sistuhs is a 1979 musical play by American playwright Saundra Pearl Sharp.

== Plot ==
A series of vignettes and monologues about the interwoven lives of a group of African American women.
