= International Film Music Critics Association Award for Breakthrough Composer of the Year =

International fim music award

The International Film Music Critics Association Award for Breakthrough Composer of the Year is an annual award given by the International Film Music Critics Association, or the IFMCA. The award is given to new and/or emerging composers whose body of work in a given year is deemed to be the best in a given year. The award was first given in 1998. It has been awards every year since 2007.

== Winners and nominations ==
=== 1990s ===
Year	Composer(s)
1998	Elia Cmíral
1998	Burkhard Dallwitz
1998	Christopher Gordon
1998	Brian Lock

=== 2000s ===
Year	Composer(s)
2006	Brett Rosenberg
2006	Justin Burnett
2006	Nicholas Dodd
2006	Mark Orton
2006	Douglas Pipes
2007	Ilan Eshkeri
2007	Jane Antonia Cornish
2007	Jonny Greenwood
2007	Fernando Velázquez
2007	Christopher Wong
2008	Andrew Lockington
2008	Paul Cantelon
2008	Nico Muhly
2008	Atli Örvarsson
2008	Max Richter
2009	James Peterson
2009	Henry Jackman
2009	Abel Korzeniowski
2009	Clinton Shorter
2009	Austin Wintory

=== 2010s ===
Year	Composer(s)
2010	Nuno Malo
2010	Óscar Araujo
2010	Arnau Bataller
2010	Daft Punk
2010	Herbert Grönemeyer
2011	Ludovic Bource
2011	Brian Byrne
2011	The Chemical Brothers
2011	Michael Richard Plowman
2011	Lucas Vidal
2012	Nathan Johnson
2012	Zeltia Montes
2012	Nic Raine
2012	Dan Romer & Benh Zeitlin
2012	Joseph Trapanese
2013	Laurent Eyquem
2013	César Benito
2013	Sarah Class
2013	Alex Ebert
2013	Steven Price
2014	Mica Levi
2014	Alexander Cimini
2014	Gustavo Dudamel
2014	Matthew Llewellyn
2014	John Paesano
2015	Maurizio Malagnini
2015	Cat's Eyes (Rachel Zeffira and Faris Badwan)
2015	Gareth Coker
2015	Ludwig Göransson
2015	Diego Navarro
2016	Justin Hurwitz
2016	Chad Cannon
2016	Kyle Dixon & Michael Stein
2016	Simon Franglen
2016	Daniel Hart
2017	George Kallis
2017	Michael Abels
2017	Anne-Kathrin Dern
2017	Alejandro Vivas
2017	Christopher Willis
2018	Amelia Warner
2018	Thomas Adès
2018	Iván Palomares
2018	Manuel Riveiro
2018	Thom Yorke
2019	Nainita Desai
2019	Bobby Krlic
2019	Mathieu Lamboley
2019	Anne-Sophie Versnaeyen
2019	Christoph Zirngibl

=== 2020s ===
Year	Composer(s)
2020	Thomas Clay
2020	Alex Baranowski
2020	Philip Klein
2020	Nami Melumad
2020	Isobel Waller-Bridge and David Schweitzer
2021	Oscar Martín Leanizbarrutia
2021	Amie Doherty
2021	Stephanie Economou
2021	Arthur Sharpe
2021	Raphaelle Thibaut
2022	Hesham Nazih
2022	Michelino Bisceglia
2022	Robin Carolan and Sebastian Gainsborough
2022	Chanda Dancy
2022	Batu Sener
2023	Paweł Lucewicz
2023	Sherri Chung
2023	Mika
2023	Łukasz Rostkowski (L.U.C)
2023	Corey Wallace
