= Primetime Emmy Award for Outstanding Contemporary Costumes =

Television award category

- Awarded for: Outstanding Contemporary Costumes
- Country: United States
- Presented by: Academy of Television Arts & Sciences
- First award: 2015
- Currently held by: Margo's Got Money Troubles and Beef (2026)
- Website: emmys.com

The Primetime Emmy Award for Outstanding Contemporary Costumes is presented as part of the Primetime Emmy Awards. In 2015, this category and Outstanding Period Costumes were created. They replaced the now retired categories of Outstanding Costumes for a Miniseries, Movie, or Special and Outstanding Costumes for a Series.

Rules require that nominations are distributed proportionally among regular series and limited series/movies, based on the number of submissions of each. For instance, if two-fifths of submissions are limited series/movies then two of the five nominees will be limited series/movies.

== Winners and nominations ==
=== 2010s ===
| Year | Program | Episode | Nominees | Network |
|---|---|---|---|---|
| 2010 | Outstanding Costumes for a Miniseries, Movie or Special | | | |
| 2010 | Return to Cranford | "Part 2" | Jenny Beavan and Alison Beard | PBS |
| 2010 | Emma | "Part 2" | Rosalind Ebbutt and Amanda Keable | PBS |
| 2010 | Georgia O'Keeffe | | Michael Dennison and Frances Vega | Lifetime |
| 2010 | The Pacific | "Part 3" | Penny Rose and Ken Crouch | HBO |
| 2010 | You Don't Know Jack | | Rita Ryack and Maria Tortu | HBO |
| 2010 | Outstanding Costumes for a Series | | | |
| 2010 | The Tudors | "As It Should Be" | Joan Bergin and Susan O'Connor Cave | Showtime |
| 2010 | Glee | "The Power of Madonna" | Lou Eyrich and Marisa Aboitiz | Fox |
| 2010 | The Good Wife | "Crash" | Daniel Lawson, Jennifer Rogien Faletti and Daniele Hollywood | CBS |
| 2010 | Mad Men | "Souvenir" | Janie Bryant and Le Dawson | AMC |
| 2010 | 30 Rock | "I Do Do" | Tom Broecker, Remy Pearce and Joanna Brett | NBC |
| 2011 | Outstanding Costumes for a Miniseries, Movie or Special | | | |
| 2011 | Downton Abbey | "Part 1" | Susannah Buxton and Caroline McCal | PBS |
| 2011 | Cinema Verite | | Suttirat Anne Larlarb and Joseph T. Mastrolia | HBO |
| 2011 | Mildred Pierce | "Part 2" | Ann Roth, Michelle Matland and Patrick Wiley | HBO |
| 2011 | Upstairs, Downstairs | "The Fledgling" | Amy Roberts and Giles Gale | PBS |
| 2011 | Outstanding Costumes for a Series | | | |
| 2011 | The Borgias | "Lucrezia's Wedding" | Gabriella Pescucci and Uliva Pizzetti | Showtime |
| 2011 | Boardwalk Empire | "Anastasia" | John Dunn, Courtney McClain and Chris Peterson | HBO |
| 2011 | Game of Thrones | "The Pointy End" | Michele Clapton and Rachael Webb-Crozier | HBO |
| 2011 | Glee | "New York City" | Lou Eyrich and Marisa Aboitiz | Fox |
| 2011 | Mad Men | "The Beautiful Girls" | Janie Bryant and Le Dawson | AMC |
| 2012 | Outstanding Costumes for a Miniseries, Movie or Special | | | |
| 2012 | Great Expectations | | Annie Symons and Yvonne Duckett | PBS |
| 2012 | American Horror Story | "Halloween" | Chrisi Karvonides and Conan Castro | FX |
| 2012 | Hatfields & McCoys | "Part 2" | Karri Hutchinson and Adina Bucur | History |
| 2012 | Hemingway & Gellhorn | | Ruth Myers and William McPhail | HBO |
| 2012 | Sherlock: A Scandal in Belgravia | | Sarah Arthur and Ceri Walford | PBS |
| 2012 | Treasure Island | "Part 1" | Lorna Marie Mugan and Rhona McGuirke | Syfy |
| 2012 | Outstanding Costumes for a Series | | | |
| 2012 | Game of Thrones | "The Prince of Winterfell" | Michele Clapton, Alexander Fordham and Chloe Aubry | HBO |
| 2012 | Boardwalk Empire | "21" | John Dunn and Maria Zamansky | HBO |
| 2012 | The Borgias | "The Confession" | Gabriella Pescucci and Uliva Pizzetti | Showtime |
| 2012 | Downton Abbey | "Episode One" | Susannah Buxton | PBS |
| 2012 | Once Upon a Time | "Hat Trick" | Eduardo Castro and Monique McRae | ABC |
| 2013 | Outstanding Costumes for a Miniseries, Movie or Special | | | |
| 2013 | Behind the Candelabra | | Ellen Mirojnick and Robert Q. Matthews | HBO |
| 2013 | American Horror Story: Asylum | "Madness Ends" | Lou Eyrich and Marcy Lavender | FX |
| 2013 | The Girl | | Diana Cilliers and Melissa Moritz | HBO |
| 2013 | Killing Lincoln | | Amy Andrews Harrell and Renee Jones | Nat Geo |
| 2013 | Parade's End | "Episode 3" | Sheena Napier and Jenna McGranaghan | HBO |
| 2013 | Phil Spector | | Debra McGuire and Lorraine Calvert | HBO |
| 2013 | Outstanding Costumes for a Series | | | |
| 2013 | The Borgias | "The Gunpowder Plot" | Gabriella Pescucci, Uliva Pizzetti and Gábor Homonnay | Showtime |
| 2013 | Boardwalk Empire | "Resolution" | John Dunn and Maria Zamansky | HBO |
| 2013 | Downton Abbey | "Episode Four" | Caroline McCall and Dulcie Scott | PBS |
| 2013 | Game of Thrones | "Walk of Punishment" | Michele Clapton, Alexander Fordham and Chloe Aubry | HBO |
| 2013 | Once Upon a Time | "Queen of Hearts" | Eduardo Castro and Monique McRae | ABC |
| 2014 | Outstanding Costumes for a Miniseries, Movie or Special | | | |
| 2014 | American Horror Story: Coven | | Lou Eyrich, Elizabeth Macey and Ken Van Duyne | FX |
| 2014 | House of Versace | | Claire Nadon and Nicole Magny | Lifetime |
| 2014 | The Normal Heart | | Daniel Orlandi, Gail A. Fitzgibbons, Hartsell Taylor and Maria Tortu | HBO |
| 2014 | Sherlock: His Last Vow | | Sarah Arthur and Ceri Walford | PBS |
| 2014 | The White Queen | "Long Live the King" | Nic Ede, Raissa Hans and Elizabeth Healy | Starz |
| 2014 | Outstanding Costumes for a Series | | | |
| 2014 | Game of Thrones | "The Lion and the Rose" | Michele Clapton, Sheena Wichary, Alexander Fordham and Nina Ayres | HBO |
| 2014 | Boardwalk Empire | "New York Sour" | John Dunn, Lisa Padovani and Joseph La Corte | HBO |
| 2014 | Downton Abbey | "Episode Eight" | Caroline McCall, Heather Leat and Poli Kyriacou | PBS |
| 2014 | Mad Men | "Time Zones" | Janie Bryant, Tiffany White Stanton and Stacy Horn | AMC |
| 2014 | Once Upon a Time | "A Curious Thing" | Eduardo Castro and Monique McRae | ABC |
| 2015 | Outstanding Costumes for a Contemporary Series, Limited Series or Movie | | | |
| 2015 | Transparent | "Symbolic Exemplar" | Marie Schley and Nancy Jarzynko | Amazon |
| 2015 | Empire | "Pilot" | Paolo Nieddu and Eileen McCahill | Fox |
| 2015 | Empire | "The Lyon's Roar" | Rita McGhee and Sukari McGill | Fox |
| 2015 | Gotham | "Under the Knife" | Lisa Padovani and Danielle Schembre-Burakovsy | Fox |
| 2015 | The Mindy Project | "San Francisco Bae" | Salvador Pérez Jr., Gala Autumn and Ivy Thaide | Fox |
| 2015 | Olive Kitteridge | "Incoming Tide" | Jenny Eagan and Debbie Holbrook | HBO |
| 2016 | American Horror Story: Hotel | "Chutes and Ladders" | Lou Eyrich, Helen Huang and Marisa Aboitiz | FX |
| 2016 | Empire | "Past Is Prologue" | Paolo Nieddu, Jennifer Salim and Mary Lane | Fox |
| 2016 | The Good Wife | "End" | Daniel Lawson, David Brooks, Daniele Hollywood and Angel Peart | CBS |
| 2016 | Grace and Frankie | "The Party" | Allyson B. Fanger and Lori DeLapp | Netflix |
| 2016 | Transparent | "Kina Hora" | Marie Schley and Mark A. Summer | Amazon |
2017
| 2017 | Big Little Lies | "You Get What You Need" | Alix Friedberg, Risa Garcia and Patricia McLaughlin | HBO |
| 2017 | Empire | "Light in Darkness" | Paolo Nieddu, Jennifer Salim and Mary Lane | Fox |
| 2017 | Grace and Frankie | "The Art Show" | Allyson B. Fanger, Heather Pain and Lori DeLapp | Netflix |
| 2017 | House of Cards (Note: In 2017, Hala Bahmet, Marina Ray and Elinor Bardach were nominated for the NBC series This Is Us. The nomination was rescinded after it was determined that the submitted episode "Moonshadow" was primarily set in the 1970s, violating the TV Academy's rule that "more than 50 percent" of the episode must be contemporary (within 25 years of the air date). Sixth place finisher House of Cards became the fifth nominee.) | "Chapter 61" | Johanna Argan, Kemal Harris, Jessica Wenger and Steffany Bernstein-Pratt | Netflix |
| 2017 | Transparent | "To Sardines and Back" | Marie Schley, Hannah Schneider and Leslie Herman | Amazon |
| 2018 | Outstanding Contemporary Costumes | | | |
| 2018 | The Assassination of Gianni Versace: American Crime Story | "The Man Who Would Be Vogue" | Lou Eyrich, Allison Leach, Rebecca Guzzi and Nora Pedersen | FX |
| 2018 | Black-ish | "Juneteenth" | Michelle Cole, Delores Ybarra and Devon Patterson | ABC |
| 2018 | Empire | "Slave to Memory" | Paolo Nieddu, Jennifer Salim and Steffany Bernstein-Pratt | Fox |
| 2018 | Grace and Frankie | "The Expiration Date" | Allyson B. Fanger, Heather Pain and Lori DeLapp | Netflix |
| 2018 | This Is Us | "The Wedding" | Hala Bahmet and Elinor Bardach | NBC |
2019
| 2019 | Russian Doll | "Superiority Complex" | Jennifer Rogien, Charlotte Svenson and Melissa Stanton | Netflix |
| 2019 | Black-ish | "Purple Rain" | Michelle Cole and Devon Patterson | ABC |
| 2019 | Escape at Dannemora | "Episode 6" | David Robinson, Ann Bryant and Barbara Hause | Showtime |
| 2019 | Grace and Frankie | "The Wedding" | Allyson B. Fanger, Kristine Haag and Lori DeLapp | Netflix |
| 2019 | Schitt's Creek | "The Dress" | Debra Hanson and Darci Cheyne | Pop TV |
| 2019 | Sharp Objects | "Closer" | Alix Friedberg and Shawn Barry | HBO |

=== 2020s ===
| Year | Program | Episode | Nominees | Network |
|---|---|---|---|---|
2020
| 2020 | Schitt's Creek | "Happy Ending" | Debra Hanson and Darci Cheyne | Pop TV |
| 2020 | Black-ish | "Hair Day" | Michelle Cole | ABC |
| 2020 | Euphoria | "The Next Episode" | Heidi Bivens, Danielle Baker and Katina Danabassis | HBO |
| 2020 | Grace and Frankie | "The Tank" | Allyson B. Fanger, Kristine Haag and Lori DeLapp | Netflix |
| 2020 | Killing Eve | "Are You from Pinner?" | Sam Perry, Katie Broome and Justin Selway | BBC America |
| 2020 | The Politician | "Pilot" | Lou Eyrich, Claire Parkinson, Lily Parkinson and Nora Pederson | Netflix |
| 2020 | Unorthodox | "Part 2" | Justine Seymour, Simone Kreska and Barbara Schramm | Netflix |
2021
| 2021 | Pose | "Series Finale" | Analucia McGorty, Michelle Roy and Linda Giammarese | FX |
| 2021 | Black-ish | "Our Wedding Dre" | Michelle Cole and Juliann M. Smith DeVito | ABC |
| 2021 | Euphoria | "Fuck Anyone Who's Not a Sea Blob" | Heidi Bivens, Devon Patterson and Angelina Vitto | HBO |
| 2021 | Hacks | "There Is No Line" | Kathleen Felix-Hager and Karen Bellamy | HBO Max |
| 2021 | I May Destroy You | "Social Media Is a Great Way to Connect" | Lynsey Moore, Rosie Lack and Debbie Roberts | HBO |
| 2021 | Mare of Easttown | "Miss Lady Hawk Herself" | Meghan Kasperlik, Francisco Stoll, Taylor Smith, Laura Downing and Jennifer Hryniw | HBO |
| 2021 | The Politician | "New York State of Mind" | Claire Parkinson, Lily Parkinson, James Hammer and Laura Steinmann | Netflix |
2022
| 2022 | Hacks | "The Captain's Wife" | Kathleen Felix-Hager and Karen Bellamy | HBO Max |
| 2022 | Black-ish | "That's What Friends Are For" | Michelle Cole, Stanley Vance Hudson and Suzanne M. Bantit | ABC |
| 2022 | Euphoria | "Trying to Get to Heaven Before They Close the Door" | Heidi Bivens, Devon Patterson and Angelina Vitto | HBO |
| 2022 | Only Murders in the Building | "Who Is Tim Kono?" | Dana Covarrubias, Amanda Bujak and Amy Burt | Hulu |
| 2022 | Pam & Tommy | "Destroyer of Worlds" | Kameron Lennox, Danielle Baker and Petra Larsen | Hulu |
| 2022 | The White Lotus | "Arrivals" | Alex Bovaird, Brian Sprouse and Eileen Stroup | HBO |
| 2023 | Outstanding Contemporary Costumes for a Series | | | |
| 2023 | Wednesday | "Wednesday's Child Is Full of Woe" | Colleen Atwood, Mark Sutherland, Robin Soutar, Claudia Littlefield and Adina Bucur | Netflix |
| 2023 | Emily in Paris | "What's It All About..." | Marylin Fitoussi, Herehau Ragonneau, Daniela Telle and Marie Fremont | Netflix |
| 2023 | The Last of Us | "Endure and Survive" | Cynthia Ann Summers, Kelsey Chobotar, Rebecca Toon and Michelle Carr | HBO |
| 2023 | Only Murders in the Building | "Framed" | Dana Covarrubias, Abby Geoghegan and Kathleen Gerlach | Hulu |
| 2023 | Succession | "Church and State" | Michelle Matland, Jonathan Schwartz and Mark Agnes | HBO |
| 2023 | The White Lotus | "That's Amore" | Alex Bovaird, Brian Sprouse and Margherita Zanobetti | HBO |
| 2023 | Outstanding Contemporary Costumes for a Limited or Anthology Series or Movie | | | |
| 2023 | Beef | "The Birds Don't Sing, They Screech in Pain" | Helen Huang, Austin Wittick, YJ Hwang and Mark Anthony Summers | Netflix |
| 2023 | Dolly Parton's Mountain Magic Christmas | | Provi Fulp, Jose Ramos and Steve Summers | NBC |
| 2023 | Fleishman Is in Trouble | "Me-Time" | Leah Katznelson, Angel Peart, Katie Novello, Deirdre Wegner and Anne Newton-Harding | FX |
| 2023 | Swarm | "Honey" | Dominique Dawson, Brittny Chapman and Mashal Khan | Prime Video |
| 2023 | The Watcher | "Welcome, Friends" | Lou Eyrich, Rudy Mance, Catherine Crabtree and Zakiya Dennis | Netflix |
| 2024 | Outstanding Contemporary Costumes for a Series | | | |
| 2024 | The Crown | "Sleep, Dearie Sleep" | Amy Roberts, Giles Gale and Sidonie Roberts | Netflix |
| 2024 | The Bear | "Fishes" | Courtney Wheeler, Lariana Santiago and Steven "Rage" Rehage | FX |
| 2024 | Hacks | "Just for Laughs" | Kathleen Felix-Hager, Karen Bellamy and Rory Cunningham | Max |
| 2024 | Only Murders in the Building | "Sitzprobe" | Dana Covarrubias, Kathleen Gerlach and Abby Geoghegan | Hulu |
| 2024 | The Righteous Gemstones | "For I Know the Plans I Have for You" | Christina Flannery, Maura "Maude" Cusick and Rebecca DeNoewer | HBO |
| 2024 | Outstanding Contemporary Costumes for a Limited or Anthology Series or Movie | | | |
| 2024 | American Horror Story: Delicate | "The Auteur" | Jacqueline Demeterio, Jessica Zavala, Jennifer Salim, Jose Bantula and Jillian Daidone | FX |
| 2024 | Baby Reindeer | "Episode 4" | Mekel Bailey and Imogen Holness | Netflix |
| 2024 | Fargo | "Insolubilia" | Carol Case, Charl Boettger and Michelle Carr | FX |
| 2024 | The Regime | "The Heroes' Banquet" | Consolata Boyle, Marion Weise, Bobbie Edwards, Johanna Garrad and Jane Law | HBO |
| 2024 | True Detective: Night Country | "Part 5" | Alex Bovaird, Linda Gardar, Rebekka Jónsdóttir, Tina Ulee, Giulia Moschioni and Brian Sprouse | HBO |
| 2025 | Outstanding Contemporary Costumes for a Series | | | |
| 2025 | The Studio | "CinemaCon" | Kameron Lennox, Betsy Glick and Tyler Kinney | Apple TV+ |
| 2025 | Emily in Paris | "The Grey Area" | Marylin Fitoussi, Chloé Bartonio and Herehau Ragonneau | Netflix |
| 2025 | Hacks | "Heaven" | Kathleen Felix-Hager and Keely Crum | HBO Max |
| 2025 | The Righteous Gemstones | "You Hurled Me Into the Very Heart of the Seas" | Christina Flannery, Elizabeth Tagg, Maura "Maude" Cusick and Aughra Moon | HBO |
| 2025 | The White Lotus | "Same Spirits, New Forms" | Alex Bovaird, Eileen Sieff Stroup, Preeyanan 'Lin' Suwannathada, Brian Sprouse and Giulia Moschioni | HBO |
| 2025 | Outstanding Contemporary Costumes for a Limited or Anthology Series or Movie | | | |
| 2025 | The Penguin | "A Great or Little Thing" | Helen Huang, Kate Smith, Austin Wittick, Becca Freund and Esther J. Han | HBO |
| 2025 | Adolescence | "Episode 2" | Jessica Schofield, William Maher and Tracey Cliffe | Netflix |
| 2025 | American Horror Stories | "Backrooms" | Sara O'Donnell, Laura McCarthy, Alyssa Bracken and Ashley Holvick | FX |
| 2025 | Dying for Sex | "Topping is a Sacred Skill" | Melissa Toth, Kenn Hamilton, Caroline Quiroga, Chris Rumery and David Burnett | FX |
| 2025 | Sirens | "Exile" | Caroline Duncan, Paul Thompson, Tricia Barsamian, Heather Breen and Sarah Bacot | Netflix |
| 2026 | Outstanding Contemporary Costumes for a Series | | | |
| 2026 | Margo's Got Money Troubles | "Grudge Match" | Mirren Gordon-Crozier, Tracy Jarvis, Brooke Thatawat, Mallory Bradley and Tara White | Apple TV |
| 2026 | Emily in Paris | "Veni, Vidi, Venezia" | Marylin Fitoussi, Chloé Bartonio, Herehau Ragonneau and Daniela Telle | Netflix |
| 2026 | Hacks | "No New Tricks" | Kathleen Felix-Hager, Keely Crum, Colleen Washington, Shannon Felix and Rory Cunningham | HBO Max |
| 2026 | Only Murders in the Building | "After You" | Dana Covarrubias, Amy Burt, Abigail Geoghegan and Liana John | Hulu |
| 2026 | Wednesday | "Woe Me the Money" | Colleen Atwood, Mark Sutherland, Tom Hornsby, Robin Soutar, Connor Dalton and Charlotte Child | Netflix |
| 2026 | Outstanding Contemporary Costumes for a Limited or Anthology Series or Movie | | | |
| 2026 | Beef | "All the Things We're Never Going to Have" | Olga Mill, Bailey Gardner, Sarah Basta and Kellie Ishisaki | Netflix |
| 2026 | The Beast in Me | "Elephant in the Room" | Arjun Bhasin, Emmanuelle Martin and Alyssa Avellino-Faivre | Netflix |
| 2026 | Black Rabbit | "The Black Rabbits" | Amy Westcott, Jessica Trejos, Min Ji Kim and Amy Burt | Netflix |
| 2026 | DTF St. Louis | "Cornhole" | Molly Maginnis, Nadia Durham and Brenda Maben | HBO |
| 2026 | Remarkably Bright Creatures | | Carla Hetland, Laura Zydervelt and Margaret Schliessler | Netflix |

== Designers with multiple awards ==
This total includes nominations for Outstanding Costumes for a Series.

2 awards

- L. Paul Dafelmair
- Lou Eyrich
- Shelly Levine
- Bob Mackie
- Patrick R. Norris
- Loree Parral
- Uliva Pizzetti

== Programs with multiple awards ==
This total includes nominations for Outstanding Costumes for a Series.

2 awards

- American Horror Story
- Beef
- Fame
- JAG
- Picket Fences
- thirtysomething

== Designers with multiple nominations ==
This total includes nominations for Outstanding Costumes for a Series.

11 nominations

- Shelly Levine
- Loree Parral

8 nominations

- Lou Eyrich

6 nominations

- Ret Turner

5 nominations

- Michelle Cole
- Lori DeLapp
- Bill Hargate
- Allyson B. Fanger
- Patrick R. Norris

4 nominations

- Catherine Adair
- Mark Agnes
- Cliff Chally
- Grady Hunt
- Al Lehman
- Nolan Miller
- Paolo Nieddu
- Devon Patterson
- Juliet Polcsa
- Jennifer Salim
- Robert Turturice
- Joyce Unruh
- Karo Vartanian

3 nominations

- Marisa Aboitiz
- Karen Bellamy
- Heidi Bivens
- Alex Bovaird
- Molly Harris Campbell
- Shawn Holly Cookson
- Brenda Cooper
- Dana Covarrubias
- L. Paul Dafelmair
- Kathleen Felix-Hager
- Terry Gordon
- Anne Hartley
- Bob Mackie
- Bridget Ostersehite
- Lauren Press
- Marie Schley
- Brian Sprouse
- Marti M. Squyres
- Rebecca Weinberg

2 nominations

- Danielle Baker
- Steffany Bernstein-Pratt
- Adina Bucur
- Michelle Carr
- Eduardo Castro
- Michael R. Chapman
- Darci Cheyne
- Kevin Draves
- Lori Eskowitz
- Elizabeth Feldbauer
- Dan Frank
- Alix Friedberg
- Abby Geoghegan
- Kathleen Gerlach
- Laura Goldsmith
- Kristine Haag
- Artie Hach
- Luellyn Harper
- Debra Hanson
- Leslie Herman
- Daniele Hollywood
- Helen Huang
- Mary Lane
- Daniel Lawson
- Michelle Matland
- Marilyn Matthews
- Jill Ohanneson
- Heather Pain
- Claire Parkinson
- Lily Parkinson
- Angel Peart
- Melina Root
- Linda Serijan
- Jerry Skeels
- Wendy Stephanelli
- Rachael Stanley
- Travilla
- Patricia Trujillo
- Angelina Vitto
- Mary Walbridge
- Kim Wilcox
- Eilish Zebrasky

== Programs with multiple nominations ==
This total includes nominations for Outstanding Costumes for a Series.

6 nominations

- The Crown (Note: Total includes The Crown’s nominations for Outstanding Period Costumes.)
- L.A. Law
- The Nanny

5 nominations

- Black-ish
- China Beach
- Empire
- Grace and Frankie
- Hacks
- Murder, She Wrote
- Sex and the City
- thirtysomething

4 nominations

- Designing Women
- Desperate Housewives
- Dynasty
- Only Murders in the Building
- Picket Fences
- The Sopranos

3 nominations

- Alias
- Emily in Paris
- Euphoria
- JAG
- Mama's Family
- Married... with Children
- Moonlighting
- Murphy Brown
- Ugly Betty
- Pose (Note: Total includes Pose’s nominations for Outstanding Period Costumes.)
- Six Feet Under
- Transparent
- The White Lotus

2 nominations

- Ally McBeal
- American Horror Story
- Beef
- Cybill
- Dallas
- Fame
- Glee
- The Good Wife
- NewsRadio
- Night Court
- The Politician
- The Righteous Gemstones
- Scarecrow and Mrs. King
- Schitt's Creek
- Wednesday
- Will & Grace
