= Primetime Emmy Award for Outstanding Fantasy/Sci-Fi Costumes =

Television award category

Primetime Emmy Award for Outstanding Fantasy/Sci-Fi
- Awarded for: Outstanding Fantasy/Sci-Fi
- Country: United States
- Presented by: Academy of Television Arts & Sciences
- First award: 2018
- Currently held by: Fallout (2026)
- Website: emmys.com

The Primetime Emmy Award for Outstanding Fantasy/Sci-Fi Costumes is presented as part of the Primetime Emmy Awards. In 2015, categories for period/fantasy and contemporary costumes were created. The categories were divided in 2018 for period and fantasy/sci-fi costumes. They replaced the retired categories for Outstanding Costumes for a Miniseries, Movie, or Special and Outstanding Costumes for a Series.

Rules require that nominations are distributed proportionally among regular series and limited series/movies, based on the number of submissions of each. For instance, if two-fifths of submissions are limited series/movies then two of the five nominees will be limited series/movies.

== Winners and nominations ==
=== 2010s ===
Year	Program	Episode	Nominees	Network
2010	Outstanding Costumes for a Miniseries, Movie or Special			
2010	Return to Cranford	"Part 2"	Jenny Beavan and Alison Beard	PBS
2010	Emma	"Part 2"	Rosalind Ebbutt and Amanda Keable	PBS
2010	Georgia O'Keeffe		Michael Dennison and Frances Vega	Lifetime
2010	The Pacific	"Part 3"	Penny Rose and Ken Crouch	HBO
2010	You Don't Know Jack		Rita Ryack and Maria Tortu	HBO
2010	Outstanding Costumes for a Series			
2010	The Tudors	"As It Should Be"	Joan Bergin and Susan O'Connor Cave	Showtime
2010	Glee	"The Power of Madonna"	Lou Eyrich and Marisa Aboitiz	Fox
2010	The Good Wife	"Crash"	Daniel Lawson, Jennifer Rogien Faletti and Daniele Hollywood	CBS
2010	Mad Men	"Souvenir"	Janie Bryant and Le Dawson	AMC
2010	30 Rock	"I Do Do"	Tom Broecker, Remy Pearce and Joanna Brett	NBC
2011	Outstanding Costumes for a Miniseries, Movie or Special			
2011	Downton Abbey	"Part 1"	Susannah Buxton and Caroline McCal	PBS
2011	Cinema Verite		Suttirat Anne Larlarb and Joseph T. Mastrolia	HBO
2011	Mildred Pierce	"Part 2"	Ann Roth, Michelle Matland and Patrick Wiley	HBO
2011	Upstairs, Downstairs	"The Fledgling"	Amy Roberts and Giles Gale	PBS
2011	Outstanding Costumes for a Series			
2011	The Borgias	"Lucrezia's Wedding"	Gabriella Pescucci and Uliva Pizzetti	Showtime
2011	Boardwalk Empire	"Anastasia"	John Dunn, Courtney McClain and Chris Peterson	HBO
2011	Game of Thrones	"The Pointy End"	Michele Clapton and Rachael Webb-Crozier	HBO
2011	Glee	"New York City"	Lou Eyrich and Marisa Aboitiz	Fox
2011	Mad Men	"The Beautiful Girls"	Janie Bryant and Le Dawson	AMC
2012	Outstanding Costumes for a Miniseries, Movie or Special			
2012	Great Expectations		Annie Symons and Yvonne Duckett	PBS
2012	American Horror Story	"Halloween"	Chrisi Karvonides and Conan Castro	FX
2012	Hatfields & McCoys	"Part 2"	Karri Hutchinson and Adina Bucur	History
2012	Hemingway & Gellhorn		Ruth Myers and William McPhail	HBO
2012	Sherlock: A Scandal in Belgravia		Sarah Arthur and Ceri Walford	PBS
2012	Treasure Island	"Part 1"	Lorna Marie Mugan and Rhona McGuirke	Syfy
2012	Outstanding Costumes for a Series			
2012	Game of Thrones	"The Prince of Winterfell"	Michele Clapton, Alexander Fordham and Chloe Aubry	HBO
2012	Boardwalk Empire	"21"	John Dunn and Maria Zamansky	HBO
2012	The Borgias	"The Confession"	Gabriella Pescucci and Uliva Pizzetti	Showtime
2012	Downton Abbey	"Episode One"	Susannah Buxton	PBS
2012	Once Upon a Time	"Hat Trick"	Eduardo Castro and Monique McRae	ABC
2013	Outstanding Costumes for a Miniseries, Movie or Special			
2013	Behind the Candelabra		Ellen Mirojnick and Robert Q. Matthews	HBO
2013	American Horror Story: Asylum	"Madness Ends"	Lou Eyrich and Marcy Lavender	FX
2013	The Girl		Diana Cilliers and Melissa Moritz	HBO
2013	Killing Lincoln		Amy Andrews Harrell and Renee Jones	Nat Geo
2013	Parade's End	"Episode 3"	Sheena Napier and Jenna McGranaghan	HBO
2013	Phil Spector		Debra McGuire and Lorraine Calvert	HBO
2013	Outstanding Costumes for a Series			
2013	The Borgias	"The Gunpowder Plot"	Gabriella Pescucci, Uliva Pizzetti and Gábor Homonnay	Showtime
2013	Boardwalk Empire	"Resolution"	John Dunn and Maria Zamansky	HBO
2013	Downton Abbey	"Episode Four"	Caroline McCall and Dulcie Scott	PBS
2013	Game of Thrones	"Walk of Punishment"	Michele Clapton, Alexander Fordham and Chloe Aubry	HBO
2013	Once Upon a Time	"Queen of Hearts"	Eduardo Castro and Monique McRae	ABC
2014	Outstanding Costumes for a Miniseries, Movie or Special			
2014	American Horror Story: Coven		Lou Eyrich, Elizabeth Macey and Ken Van Duyne	FX
2014	House of Versace		Claire Nadon and Nicole Magny	Lifetime
2014	The Normal Heart		Daniel Orlandi, Gail A. Fitzgibbons, Hartsell Taylor and Maria Tortu	HBO
2014	Sherlock: His Last Vow		Sarah Arthur and Ceri Walford	PBS
2014	The White Queen	"Long Live the King"	Nic Ede, Raissa Hans and Elizabeth Healy	Starz
2014	Outstanding Costumes for a Series			
2014	Game of Thrones	"The Lion and the Rose"	Michele Clapton, Sheena Wichary, Alexander Fordham and Nina Ayres	HBO
2014	Boardwalk Empire	"New York Sour"	John Dunn, Lisa Padovani and Joseph La Corte	HBO
2014	Downton Abbey	"Episode Eight"	Caroline McCall, Heather Leat and Poli Kyriacou	PBS
2014	Mad Men	"Time Zones"	Janie Bryant, Tiffany White Stanton and Stacy Horn	AMC
2014	Once Upon a Time	"A Curious Thing"	Eduardo Castro and Monique McRae	ABC
2015	Outstanding Costumes for a Period/Fantasy Series, Limited Series or Movie			
2015	American Horror Story: Freak Show	"Monsters Among Us"	Lou Eyrich, Elizabeth Macey and Ken Van Duyne	FX
2015	Boardwalk Empire	"Golden Days for Boys and Girls"	John Dunn, Maria Zamansky, James Hammer and Joseph La Corte	HBO
2015	Downton Abbey	"A Moorland Holiday"	Anna Robbins, Michael Weldon and Kathryn Tart	PBS
2015	Game of Thrones	"The Dance of Dragons"	Michele Clapton, Alex Fordham, Nina Ayres and Sheena Wichary	HBO
2015	Wolf Hall	"Anna Regina"	Joanna Eatwell, T.K. Lang and Clare Vyse	PBS
2016	Game of Thrones	"The Winds of Winter"	Michele Clapton, Chloe Aubry and Sheena Wichary	HBO
2016	Downton Abbey	"Episode Eight"	Anna Mary Scott Robbins, Kathryn Tart and Michael Weldon	PBS
2016	Outlander	"Not in Scotland Anymore"	Terry Dresbach, Elle Wilson, Nadine Powell and Anna Lau	Starz
2016	The People v. O. J. Simpson: American Crime Story	"Marcia, Marcia, Marcia"	Hala Bahmet, Marina Ray and Elinor Bardach	FX
2016	Roots	"Night One"	Ruth E. Carter, Diana Cilliers, Megan "Bijou" Coates, Hetta Burger, Meagan McLaughlin Luster and Gillian Gregg	History
2017
2017	The Crown	"Wolferton Splash"	Michele Clapton, Alex Fordham, Emma O'Loughlin and Kate O'Farrell	Netflix
2017	Feud: Bette and Joan	"And the Winner Is... (The Oscars of 1963)"	Lou Eyrich, Hannah Jacobs and Katie Saunders	FX
2017	Genius	"Einstein: Chapter Seven"	Sonu Mishra, Martina Hejlova and Petia Krckova	Nat Geo
2017	The Handmaid's Tale	"Offred"	Ane Crabtree and Sheena Wichary	Hulu
2017	Westworld	"The Original"	Trish Summerville, Jo Kissack Folsom and Lynda Foote	HBO
2018	Outstanding Fantasy/Sci-Fi Costumes			
2018	Game of Thrones	"Beyond the Wall"	Michele Clapton, Alexander Fordham, Emma O'Loughlin and Kate O'Farrell	HBO
2018	Fahrenheit 451		Meghan Kasperlik, Renee Fontana and Cori Burchell	HBO
2018	The Handmaid's Tale	"Seeds"	Ane Crabtree and Natalie Bronfman	Hulu
2018	A Series of Unfortunate Events	"The Vile Village, Part 1"	Cynthia Summers, Phoebe Parsons and Kelsey Chobotar	Netflix
2018	Westworld	"Akane No Mai"	Sharen Davis, Charlene Amateau, Jodie Stern and Sandy Kenyon	HBO
2019
2019	Game of Thrones	"The Bells"	Michele Clapton, Emma O'Loughlin and Kate O'Farrell	HBO
2019	American Horror Story: Apocalypse	"Forbidden Fruit"	Lou Eyrich, Paula Bradley, Rebecca Guzzi and Charlene Amateau	FX
2019	Good Omens	"Hard Times"	Claire Anderson, Bobbie Edwards and Beth Lewis	Amazon Prime Video
2019	The Handmaid's Tale	"The Word"	Ane Crabtree and Natalie Bronfman	Hulu
2019	A Series of Unfortunate Events	"Penultimate Peril, Part 2"	Cynthia Summers, Kelsey Chobotar, Phoebe Parsons, Lorelei Burk and Courtney McKenzie	Netflix

=== 2020s ===
Year	Program	Episode	Nominees	Network
2020
2020	Watchmen	"It's Summer and We're Running Out of Ice"	Sharen Davis and Valerie Zielonka	HBO
2020	Carnival Row	"Aisling"	Joanna Eatwell, Clare Vyse and Jennifer Lander	Prime Video
2020	The Handmaid's Tale	"Household"	Natalie Bronfman, Helena Davis Perry and Christina Cattle	Hulu
2020	The Mandalorian	"Chapter 3: The Sin"	Joseph Porro, Julie Robar, Gigi Melton and Lauren Silvestri	Disney+
2020	Westworld	"Parce Domine"	Shay Cunliffe, Dan Bronson, Amanda Riley and Jo Kissack Folsom	HBO
2021
2021	WandaVision	"Filmed Before a Live Studio Audience"	Mayes C. Rubeo, Joseph Feltus, Daniel Selon and Virginia Burton	Disney+
2021	The Handmaid's Tale	"Nightshade"	Debra Hanson, Jane Flanders and Darci Cheyne	Hulu
2021	Lovecraft Country	"I Am."	Dayna Pink, Zachary Sheets and Terry Anderson	HBO
2021	The Mandalorian	"Chapter 13: The Jedi"	Shawna Trpcic, Julie Robar and Sara Fox	Disney+
2021	The Umbrella Academy	"The Frankel Footage"	Christopher Hargadon, Heather Crepp, William Ng and Jane Fieber	Netflix
2022
2022	What We Do in the Shadows	"The Wellness Center"	Laura Montgomery, Judy Laukkanen and Barbara Cardoso	FX
2022	The Book of Boba Fett	"Chapter 1: Stranger in a Strange Land"	Shawna Trpcic, Julie Robar and Areayl Cooper	Disney+
2022	Loki	"Glorious Purpose"	Christine Wada, Nora Pederson, Tamsin Costello and Carol Beadle	Disney+
2022	Moon Knight	"Gods and Monsters"	Meghan Kasperlik, Martin Mandeville, Richard Davies and Wilberth Gonzalez	Disney+
2022	Star Trek: Picard	"Penance"	Christine Bieselin Clark, Michell Ray Kenney and Allison Agler	Paramount+
2022	The Witcher	"Family"	Lucinda Wright and Rebecca Jempson	Netflix
2023
2023	House of the Dragon	"The Heirs of the Dragon"	Jany Temime, Katherine Burchill, Paul Yeowell, Rachel George and Joanna Lynch	HBO
2023	Hocus Pocus 2		Salvador Perez, Elizabeth Shelton and Gala Autumn	Disney+
2023	The Lord of the Rings: The Rings of Power	"A Shadow of the Past"	Kate Hawley, Libby Dempster, Lucy McLay, Jaindra Watson, Pip Lingard and Jenny Rushton	Prime Video
2023	The Mandalorian	"Chapter 22: Guns for Hire"	Shawna Trpcic, Elissa Alcala, Julie Robar and Julie Yang Silver	Disney+
2023	Obi-Wan Kenobi	"Part I"	Suttirat Anne Larlarb, Stacia Lang and Lynda Foote	Disney+
2023	What We Do in the Shadows	"The Wedding"	Laura Montgomery, Barbara Cardoso and Judy Laukkanen	FX
2024
2024	Ahsoka	"Part Eight: The Jedi, the Witch, and the Warlord"	Shawna Trpcic, Elissa Alcala and Devon Patterson	Disney+
2024	Echo	"Lowak"	Ambre Wrigley, Kizzie Martin Lillas, Kristina Elaine Taylor, Garnet Filo and Amanda Steeley	Disney+
2024	Fallout	"The End"	Amy Westcott, Amy Burt, Wendy Yang, Jonathan Knipscher and Cherie Cunningham Collins	Prime Video
2024	Loki	"1893"	Christine Wada, Harriet Kendall, Kristen Ernst-Brown and Tom Hornsby	Disney+
2024	What We Do in the Shadows	"Pride Parade"	Laura Montgomery, Kay Jameson, Amy Sztulwark and Anna Viksne	FX
2025
2025	Andor	"Harvest"	Michael Wilkinson, Kate O'Farrell, Richard Davies and Paula Fajardo	Disney+
2025	Agatha All Along	"Follow Me My Friend / To Glory at the End"	Daniel Selon, Ambre Wrigley, Christine Casaus, Maddison Carroll, Marilyn Madsen and Greg Hopwood	Disney+
2025	Black Mirror	"USS Callister: Into Infinity"	Matthew Price, Lisa Mitton, Alice Woodward, Jennifer Geach and Calum Alexander Watt	Netflix
2025	Dune: Prophecy	"The Hidden Hand"	Bojana Nikitović, Gábor Homonnay and Srdjan Perić	HBO
2025	House of the Dragon	"The Burning Mill"	Caroline McCall, Joanna Lynch, Polixeni Kyriacou, Aaron Timperley and Isabelle Conaghan	HBO
2026
2026	Fallout	"The Strip"	Dayna Pink, Conan Castro, Annie Jewell, Imogene Chayes and Christopher Lawrence	Prime Video
2026	Alien: Earth	"Neverland"	Suttirat Larlarb, Pashelle Latino, Srirattana "Bew" Wattanavitkul and Ampa "Tiew" Bunruaeng	FX
2026	The Boys	"The Frenchman, the Female, and the Man Called Mother's Milk"	Michael Ground, Laura Jean Shannon, Kim Harkness, Emily McHugh, Sarah Mgeni and Michelle Margolis Hallam	Prime Video
2026	A Knight of the Seven Kingdoms	"Seven"	Lorna Ó Ríordáin, Libby Dempster, Kyle Callanan, Rachael Webb-Crozier and Stephen O Rawe	HBO

== Designers with multiple awards ==
This total includes nominations for Outstanding Costumes for a Series.

6 awards

- Michele Clapton

4 awards

- Alexander Fordham

3 awards

- Robert Blackman
- Kate O'Farrell
- Emma O'Loughlin

2 awards

- Chloe Aubry
- Lou Eyrich
- Sheena Wichary

== Programs with multiple awards ==
This total includes wins for Outstanding Costumes for a Series.

5 wins

- Game of Thrones

3 wins

- Star Trek: The Next Generation

== Designers with multiple nominations ==
This total includes nominations for Outstanding Costumes for a Series and Primetime Emmy Award for Outstanding Costumes for a Miniseries, Movie, or Special.

11 nominations

- Robert Blackman

9 nominations

- Michele Clapton

6 nominations

- Jean-Pierre Dorleac
- Alexander Fordham

5 nominations

- Lou Eyrich

4 nominations

- Charles Knode
- Julie Robar
- Shawna Trpcic

3 nominations

- Chloe Aubry
- Natalie Bronfman
- Eduardo Castro
- Ane Crabtree
- Judy Evans
- Jo Kissack Folsom
- Grady Hunt
- Meghan Kasperlik
- Carol Kunz
- Monique McRae
- Laura Montgomery
- Kate O'Farrell
- Emma O'Loughlin
- Sheena Wichary

2 nominations

- Charlene Amateau
- Elissa Alcala
- Barbara Cardoso
- Giovanni Casalnuovo
- Kelsey Chobotar
- Sharen Davis
- Terry Dresbach
- Joanna Eatwell
- Lynda Foote
- Suttirat Anne Larlarb
- Judy Laukkanen
- Al Lehman
- Warden Neil
- Phoebe Parsons
- Anna Mary Scott Robbins
- Cynthia Summers
- Kathryn Tart
- William Ware Theiss
- Clare Vyse
- Christine Wada
- Michael Weldon
- Robert Worley

== Programs with multiple nominations ==
This total includes nominations for Outstanding Costumes for a Series.

8 nominations

- Game of Thrones

6 nominations

- Star Trek: The Next Generation

5 nominations

- The Handmaid's Tale

4 nominations

- Quantum Leap
- Star Trek: Voyager

3 nominations

- Beauty and the Beast
- The Mandalorian
- Once Upon a Time
- Westworld
- What We Do in the Shadows

2 nominations

- Amazing Stories
- Buck Rogers in the 25th Century
- Fallout
- Fantasy Island
- House of the Dragon
- Pushing Daisies
- Loki
- A Series of Unfortunate Events
- Star Trek: Deep Space Nine
- Tales from the Crypt
- 3rd Rock from the Sun
