= Primetime Emmy Award for Outstanding Costumes for a Variety, Nonfiction, or Reality Programming =

Television award category

- Awarded for: Outstanding Costumes for a Variety, Nonfiction, or Reality Programming
- Country: United States
- Presented by: Academy of Television Arts & Sciences
- Currently held by: The Masked Singer and The Traitors (2026)
- Website: emmys.com

The Primetime Emmy Award for Outstanding Costumes for a Variety, Nonfiction, or Reality Programming is presented as part of the Primetime Emmy Awards. To be eligible, the costumes must have been designed specifically for television.

== Winners and nominations ==
indicates the winner

=== 1980s ===
Year	Program	Episode	Nominees	Network
1986
1986	Sylvia Fine Kaye's Musical Comedy Tonight III (Great Performances)		Bill Hargate	PBS
1986	Alice in Wonderland	"Part 1"	Paul Zastupnevich	CBS
1986	NBC's 60th Anniversary Celebration		Alvin Colt	NBC
1986	Neil Diamond... Hello Again		Bob Mackie, Ret Turner and Bill Whitten	CBS
1987
1987	Diana Ross... Red Hot Rhythm and Blues		Ray Aghayan and Ret Turner	ABC
1987	Happy Birthday, Hollywood		Alvin Colt and Ron Talsky	ABC
1987	Liberty Weekend: Closing Ceremonies		Pete Menefee	ABC
1987	Solid Gold: Countdown '86		Rickie Hansen	Syndicated
1988	Outstanding Costume Design for a Variety or Music Program			
1988	Las Vegas: An All-Star 75th Anniversary		Pete Menefee and Ret Turner	ABC
1988	Opryland Celebrates 200 Years of American Music		Bill Hargate	Syndicated
1988	The Smothers Brothers Comedy Hour	"Harry Belafonte, Jack Lemmon and Pat Paulsen"	Madeline Ann Graneto	CBS
1988	Outstanding Individual Achievement - Special Events (Note: As a juried award, nominees had to garner 50% approval to win the award. The nominees did not meet the benchmark and no award was given.)			
1988	The 60th Annual Academy Awards		Ray Aghayan and Bob Mackie	ABC
1989
1989	The Magic of David Copperfield XI: Explosive Encounter		Daniel Orlandi	CBS
1989	The Jim Henson Hour	"Dog City"	Polly Smith, James Hammer, Connie Peterson and Lizzie Harding-Wilkins	NBC
1989	Christmas at Pee Wee's Playhouse		Max Robert and Robert Turturice	CBS
1989	The Smothers Brothers Comedy Hour	"Kenny Rogers, Maureen McGovern and Geoffrey Lewis"	Madeline Ann Kozlowski	CBS

=== 1990s ===
Year	Program	Episode	Nominees	Network
1990
1990	Mother Goose Rock 'n' Rhyme		Patricia Field	Disney
1990	Julie & Carol: Together Again		Bob Mackie	ABC
1990	Show Boat (Great Performances)		Gregory A. Poplyk and Bradford Wood	PBS
1990	The Tracey Ullman Show	"Creative Differences"	Jane Ruhm	Fox
1991
1991	Carol & Company	"That Little Extra Something"	Bob Mackie and Ret Turner	NBC
1991	Cher... At the Mirage		Bob Mackie, Michael Schmidt and Ret Turner	CBS
1991	In Living Color	"Episode 220"	Michelle Cole	Fox
1992
1992	The 64th Annual Academy Awards		Ray Aghayan	ABC
1992	The Carol Burnett Show	"Episode 403"	Bob Mackie and Ret Turner	CBS
1992	In Living Color	"Episode 302"	Michelle Cole	Fox
1992	Louise Duart: The Secret Life of Barry's Wife		Garland W. Riddle	Showtime
1993
1993	Oedipus Rex		Emi Wada and Julie Taymor	PBS
1993	The Carol Burnett Show: A Reunion		Bob Mackie and Ret Turner	CBS
1993	Christmas Fantasy on Ice		Ret Turner	CBS
1993	In Living Color	"Episode 417"	Michelle Cole	Fox
1993	Liza Minnelli: Live from Radio City Music Hall		Julie Weiss and Isaac Mizrahi	NPT
1994
1994	Tracey Ullman Takes on New York		Jane Ruhm	HBO
1994	Bob Hope's Bag Full of Christmas Memories		Warden Neil	NBC
1994	David Foster's Christmas Album		Bill Hargate	NBC
1994	In Living Color	"Episode 507"	Michelle Cole	Fox
1994	Porgy & Bess (American Playhouse / Great Performances)		Sue Blane and Janet Tharby	PBS
1995
1995	Men, Movies and Carol		Bob Mackie	CBS
1995	The 67th Annual Academy Awards		Ray Aghayan	ABC
1995	Disney's Nancy Kerrigan Special: Dreams on Ice		Jef Billings	CBS
1995	She TV		Ret Turner	ABC
1996
1996	The Best of Tracey Takes On...		Jane Ruhm	HBO
1996	Barbara Mandrell: Steppin' Out		Bill Hargate	TNN
1996	Muppets Tonight	"Garth Brooks"	Polly Smith	ABC
1997
1997	Tracey Takes On...	"1976"	Jane Ruhm	HBO
1997	The 69th Annual Academy Awards		Ray Aghayan	ABC
1997	Bette Midler: Diva Las Vegas		Bob DeMora	HBO
1997	John F. Kennedy Center 25th Anniversary Celebration		Bob Mackie	PBS
1997	Robert Altman's Jazz '34: Remembrances of Kansas City (Great Performances)		Dona Granata	PBS
1998
1998	Tracey Takes On...	"Sports"	Jane Ruhm	HBO
1998	Blue Suede Shoes — Ballet Rocks!		Bob Mackie	PBS
1998	Rodgers & Hammerstein's Cinderella		Ellen Mirojnick	ABC
1999
1999	The Snowden, Raggedy Ann and Andy Holiday Show		Jef Billings	CBS
1999	MADtv	"Episode 402"	Wendy Benbrook	Fox
1999	Saturday Night Live	"Host: Vince Vaughn"	Tom Broecker	NBC
1999	Tracey Takes On...	"America"	Jane Ruhm	HBO

=== 2000s ===
Year	Program	Episode	Nominees	Network
2000
2000	Cher: Live in Concert — From the MGM Grand in Las Vegas		David Cardona, Helen Hiatt and Bob Mackie	HBO
2000	The Hollywood Fashion Machine		Bruce Anthony Marshall	AMC
2000	MADtv	"MADtv's Movie Show"	Wendy Benbrook and Frances Hays	Fox
2000	Saturday Night Live	"Host: Christopher Walken"	Tom Broecker and Eric Justian	NBC
2000	Target Stars on Ice		Jef Billings and Regina Winters	CBS
2001
2001	Cirque Du Soleil's Dralion		François Barbeau	Bravo
2001	MADtv	"Episode 615"	Wendy Benbrook and Wanda Leavey	Fox
2001	Peter Pan Starring Cathy Rigby		Shigeru Yaji	A&E
2001	Saturday Night Live	"Host: Lara Flynn Boyle"	Tom Broecker and Eric Justian	NBC
2001	Target Presents: Scott Hamilton's Farewell to Stars on Ice		Jef Billings and Regina Winters	CBS
2002
2002	Opening Ceremony: Salt Lake 2002 Olympic Winter Games		Michael Curry, Pete Menefee, Peter Minshall, David Profeta and Tim Wonsik	NBC
2002	Madonna Live: The Drowned World Tour		Rob Saduski	HBO
2002	MADtv	"MadTV's Holiday Spectacular"	Wendy Benbrook and Wanda Leavey	Fox
2002	Saturday Night Live	"Host: Ian McKellen"	Tom Broecker and Eric Justian	NBC
2002	Target Stars on Ice		Jef Billings	A&E
2003
2003	Cher: The Farewell Tour		Bob Mackie and Hugh Durrant	NBC
2003	The First Annual Miss Dog Beauty Pageant		Sharon Day and Kristin Gallo	Fox
2003	MADtv	"Episode 809"	Wendy Benbrook, Wanda Leavey	Fox
2003	Saturday Night Live	"Host: Robert De Niro"	Tom Broecker and Eric Justian	NBC
2004
2004	Smucker's Stars on Ice 2004		Jef Billings and Regina Winters	A&E
2005
2005	MADtv	"Episode 1017"	Wendy Benbrook and Wanda Leavey	Fox
2006
2006	Benise: Nights of Fire!		Erin Lareau	PBS
2006	Dancing with the Stars	"Episode 208A"	Dana Campbell and Randall Christensen	ABC
2006	MADtv	"Episode 1109"	Wendy Benbrook and Wanda Leavey	Fox
2007
2007	Tony Bennett: An American Classic		Colleen Atwood and Kendall Errair	NBC
2008
2008	Frank TV	"Ballpark Frank"	Shanna Knecht and Elizabeth Tagg	TBS
2009
2009	So You Think You Can Dance	"Episode 415/416A"	Soyon An	Fox

=== 2010s ===
Year	Program	Episode	Nominees	Network
2010
2010	Jimmy Kimmel Live!	"Episode 09-1266"	Rodney Muñoz	ABC
2010	So You Think You Can Dance	"Top 12 Perform"	Soyon An and Grainne O'Sullivan	Fox
2010	Titan Maximum	"Went to Party, Got Crabs"	Jeanette Diane Moffat	Cartoon Network
2011
2011	Gettysburg		Kate Carin and Abigail Metcalfe	History
2011	Portlandia	"Farm"	Amanda Needham and Niki Dimitras	IFC
2012
2012	Opening Ceremony of the XVI Pan American Games Guadalajara 2011		Maria Rosario Mendoza and Grainne O'Sullivan	ESPN
2012	The X Factor	"Pepsi Challenge - Top 9 Elimination"	Marina Toybina and Grainne O'Sullivan	Fox
2013
2013	The 55th Annual Grammy Awards		Marina Toybina	CBS
2013	The Men Who Built America	"Bloody Battles"	Sarah Beers	History
2013	Portlandia	"Blackout"	Amanda Needham	IFC
2014
2014	Saturday Night Live	"Host: Jimmy Fallon"	Tom Broecker and Eric Justian	NBC
2014	So You Think You Can Dance	"Episode 1008"	Marina Toybina and Grainne O'Sullivan	Fox
2015
2015	Drunk History	"Hollywood"	Christina Mongini	Comedy Central
2015	Super Bowl XLIX Halftime Show Starring Katy Perry		Marina Toybina and Courtney Webster	NBC
2016
2016	The Wiz Live!		Paul Tazewell, Rachel Attridge and Rory Powers	NBC
2016	Dancing with the Stars	"Disney Night"	Daniela Gschwendtner, Steven Lee, Polina Roytman, Karina Torrico and Howard Sussman	ABC
2016	Grease: Live		William Ivey Long, Paul Spadone, Nanrose Buchman, Gail Fitzgibbons and Tom Beall	Fox
2016	RuPaul's Drag Race	"Keeping It 100!"	Zaldy Goco	Logo
2016	Saturday Night Live	"Host: Ryan Gosling"	Tom Broecker and Eric Justian	NBC
2017
2017	RuPaul's Drag Race	"Oh. My. Gaga!"	Zaldy Goco and Perry Meek	VH1
2017	Dancing with the Stars	"Halloween Night"	Daniela Gschwendtner, Steven Lee, Polina Roytman, Karina Torrico and Howard Sussman	ABC
2017	Hairspray Live!		Mary Vogt and Carolyn Dessert-Lauterio	NBC
2017	Portlandia	"Carrie Dates a Hunk"	Amanda Needham, Jayme Hansen and Jordan Hamilton	IFC
2017	Saturday Night Live	"Host: Emily Blunt"	Tom Broecker and Eric Justian	NBC
2018
2018	RuPaul's Drag Race	"10s Across the Board"	Zaldy Goco	VH1
2018	Dancing with the Stars	"Disney Night"	Daniela Gschwendtner, Steven Lee, Polina Roytman, Candice Rainwater and Howard Sussman	ABC
2018	Jesus Christ Superstar Live in Concert		Paul Tazewell, Laaleh Mizani, Heather Lockard and Rory Powers	NBC
2018	Saturday Night Live	"Host: Natalie Portman"	Tom Broecker and Eric Justian	NBC
2018	Tracey Ullman's Show	"Episode 1"	Helen Woolfenden, Emma Burnand and Claudia Bassi	HBO
2019
2019	RuPaul's Drag Race	"Trump: The Rusical"	Zaldy Goco and Art Conn	VH1
2019	Dancing with the Stars	"The Premiere"	Daniela Gschwendtner, Steven Lee, Polina Roytman, Candice Rainwater and Howard Sussman	ABC
2019	Homecoming: A Film by Beyoncé		Marni Senofonte, Olivier Rousteing and Timothy White	Netflix
2019	The Masked Singer	"Finale"	Marina Toybina and Grainne O'Sullivan	Fox
2019	Saturday Night Live	"Host: Sandra Oh"	Tom Broecker, Eric Justian, Cristina Natividad, Karena Sanchez and Ashley Dudek	NBC

=== 2020s ===
Year	Program	Episode	Nominees	Network
2020
2020	The Masked Singer	"The Season Kick-Off Mask-Off: Group A"	Marina Toybina, Grainne O'Sullivan, Gabrielle Letamendi and Candice Rainwater	Fox
2020	Dancing with the Stars	"Halloween Night"	Daniela Gschwendtner, Steven Lee, Howard Sussman, Polina Roytman and Karina Torrico	ABC
2020	Drunk History	"Fame"	Christina Mongini, Annalisa Adams and Cassandra Connor	Comedy Central
2020	RuPaul's Drag Race	"I'm That Bitch"	Zaldy Goco	VH1
2020	Saturday Night Live	"Host: Eddie Murphy"	Tom Broecker, Eric Justian, Cristina Natividad, Ashley Dudek, Karena Sanchez and Dale Richards	NBC
2021
2021	Black Is King		Zerina Akers and Timothy White	Disney+
2021	The Masked Singer	"Super 8 – The Plot Chickens! Part 2"	Marina Toybina, Grainne O'Sullivan, Gabrielle Letamendi and Lucia Maldonado	Fox
2021	Sherman’s Showcase Black History Month Spectacular		Ariyela Wald-Cohain, Patty Malkin and Erica Schwartz	IFC
2022
2022	We're Here	"Evansville, Indiana"	Casey Caldwell, Diego Montoya, Joshua "Domino" Schwartz, Marco Marco and Patryq Howell	HBO
2023
2023	Beauty and the Beast: A 30th Celebration		Marina Toybina, Grainne O'Sullivan, Gabrielle Letamendi, Courtney Webster, Arleen Flores and Danae McQueen	ABC
2023	We're Here	"St. George, Utah"	Diego Montoya, Marco Morante, Joshua "Domino" Schwartz, Blake Danford, Sharon Malka and Ricky Reynoso	HBO
2024
2024	Taylor Mac's 24-Decade History of Popular Music		Machine Dazzle	HBO
2025
2025	Beyoncé Bowl		Beyoncé Knowles-Carter, Shiona Turini, Erica Rice, Molly Peters, Chelsea Staebell and Timothy White	Netflix
2026
2026	The Masked Singer	"Premiere Part 1"	Grainne O'Sullivan, Luke D'Alessandro, Steven Lee, Arleen Flores, Alice Garland and Maro Isakulyan	Fox
2026	The Traitors	"The Black Banquet"	Sam Spector and Rikki Finlay	Peacock

== Programs with multiple awards ==
4 awards

- The Masked Singer

3 awards

- RuPaul's Drag Race
- So You Think You Can Dance
- Tracey Takes On...

2 awards

- MADtv
- Portlandia
- We're Here

== Programs with multiple nominations ==
11 nominations

- Saturday Night Live

7 nominations

- MADtv

6 nominations

- Dancing with the Stars

5 nominations

- The Masked Singer
- RuPaul's Drag Race

4 nominations

- In Living Color
- Tracey Takes On...

3 nominations

- Portlandia

2 nominations

- Drunk History
- The Smothers Brothers Comedy Hour
- We're Here
