= Primetime Emmy Award for Outstanding Costumes for a Series =

Television awards

The Primetime Emmy Award for Outstanding Costumes for a Series is a retired award that was presented as part of the Primetime Emmy Awards. In 2015, this category and Outstanding Costumes for a Miniseries, Movie, or Special were rearranged as Outstanding Period Costumes and Outstanding Contemporary Costumes.

== Winners and nominations ==
=== 1960s ===
Outstanding Individual Achievement in the Visual Arts

| Year | Program | Episode | Nominees | Network |
|---|---|---|---|---|
1969
| 1969 | The Carol Burnett Show | | Bob Mackie | CBS |
| 1969 | Carol Channing and Pearl Bailey on Broadway | | Ray Aghayan | ABC |

=== 1970s ===
Outstanding Achievement in Costume Design

| Year | Program | Episode | Nominees | Network |
|---|---|---|---|---|
1970
| 1970 | Diana Ross and the Supremes and The Temptations on Broadway | | Bob Mackie | NBC |
| 1970 | The Don Adams Special: Hooray for Hollywood | | George R. Whittaker | CBS |
| 1970 | Rowan & Martin's Laugh-In | | Michael Travis | NBC |
1971
| 1971 | Hamlet (Hallmark Hall of Fame) | | Martin Baugh, David Walker | NBC |
| 1971 | The Andy Williams Show | "Christmas Show" | Ret Turner | NBC |
| 1971 | Bing Crosby — Cooling It | | Robert Carlton | NBC |
| 1971 | They've Killed President Lincoln! | | Patricia Segnan | NBC |
1972
| 1972 | Elizabeth R | "The Lion's Club" | Elizabeth Waller | PBS |
| 1972 | The Fabulous Fordies | | Ret Turner | NBC |
| 1972 | The Sonny & Cher Comedy Hour | "Art Carney" | Bob Mackie, Ret Turner | CBS |
1973
| 1973 | The Julie Andrews Hour | | Jack Bear | ABC |
| 1973 | Columbo | "Dagger of the Mind" | Grady Hunt | NBC |
| 1973 | Cortez and Montezuma: Appointment with Destiny | | Christina Von Humboldt | CBS |
| 1973 | Dr. Jekyll and Mr. Hyde | | Emma Porteous | NBC |
| 1973 | Much Ado About Nothing | | Theoni V. Aldredge | CBS |
1974
| 1974 | The Autobiography of Miss Jane Pittman | | Sandy Stewart, Bruce Walkup | CBS |
| 1974 | The New Treasure Hunt | | Barbara Murphy | Syndicated |
| 1974 | The Snoop Sisters | | Grady Hunt | NBC |
| 1974 | The Sonny & Cher Comedy Hour | "The Sonny and Cher Years" | Bob Mackie, Ret Turner | CBS |
| 1974 | War and Peace | | Charles Knode | PBS |
1975
| 1975 | The Legend of Lizzie Borden | | Guy Verhille | ABC |
| 1975 | Love Among the Ruins | | Margaret Furse | ABC |
| 1975 | Cher | "Bette Midler, Flip Wilson and Elton John" | Bob Mackie | CBS |
| 1975 | Queen of the Stardust Ballroom | | Bruce Walkup | CBS |
| 1975 | The Sonny Comedy Revue | "McLean Stevenson and Joey Heatherton" | Ret Turner | ABC |

Outstanding Achievement in Costume Design for a Drama or Comedy Series

| Year | Program | Episode | Nominees | Network |
|---|---|---|---|---|
1976
| 1976 | Jennie: Lady Randolph Churchill | "Recovery" | Jane Robinson, Jill Silverside | PBS |
| 1976 | The Adams Chronicles | "John Adams: Diplomat" | Alvin Colt | PBS |
| 1976 | Rich Man, Poor Man | "Episode 1" | Charles Waldo | ABC |
1977
| 1977 | The Pallisers | "Episode 1" | Raymond Hughes | PBS |
| 1977 | The Adams Chronicles | "Henry Adams: Historian" | Alvin Colt | PBS |
| 1977 | Madame Bovary | "Episode 3" | Joan Ellacott | PBS |
| 1977 | The Quest | "Prairie Woman" | Grady Hunt | NBC |
| 1977 | Roots | "Part 1" | Jack Martell | ABC |
1978
| 1978 | Holocaust | | Peggy Farrell, Edith Almoslino | NBC |
| 1978 | Quark | "The Emperor's Quasi Norms, Part 2" | Grady Hunt | NBC |
| 1978 | 79 Park Avenue | | Yvonne Wood | NBC |
| 1978 | Testimony of Two Men | "Part 3" | Bill Jobe | Syndicated |
| 1978 | Wonder Woman | "Anschluss '77" | Donfeld | CBS |
1979
| 1979 | Battlestar Galactica | "Furlon" | Jean-Pierre Dorleac | ABC |
| 1979 | Laverne & Shirley | "The Third Annual Shotz Talent Show" | Al Lehman | ABC |

=== 1980s ===
| Year | Program | Episode | Nominees | Network |
|---|---|---|---|---|
1980
| 1980 | The Big Show | "Tony Randall and Hervé Villechaize" | Pete Menefee | NBC |
| 1980 | Buck Rogers in the 25th Century | "Flight of the War Witch, Part 2" | Al Lehman | NBC |
| 1980 | Fantasy Island | "Tattoo: The Love God/Magnolia Blossom" | Grady Hunt | ABC |
| 1980 | Galactica 1980 | "Starbuck's Last Journey" | Jean-Pierre Dorleac | ABC |
| 1980 | The Muppet Show | "Beverly Sills" | Calista Hendrickson | Syndicated |
1981
| 1981 | Shōgun | "Part 5" | Shin Nishida | NBC |
| 1981 | Beulah Land | "Part 3" | Grady Hunt | NBC |
| 1981 | Buck Rogers in the 25th Century | "The Dorian Secret" | Al Lehman | NBC |
| 1981 | Masada | "Part 4" | Vittorio Nino Novarese | ABC |
1982
| 1982 | Outstanding Costume Design for a Regular or Limited Series | | | |
| 1982 | Marco Polo | "Part 3" | Enrico Sabbatini | NBC |
| 1982 | Barbara Mandrell and the Mandrell Sisters | "Brenda Lee and Paul Williams" | Bill Hargate | NBC |
| 1982 | Brideshead Revisited | "Home and Abroad" | Jane Robinson | PBS |
| 1982 | Fantasy Island | "La Liberatora/Mr. Nobody" | Grady Hunt | ABC |
| 1982 | Solid Gold | "Andy Gibb and Marilyn McCoo" | Rickie A. Hansen | Syndicated |
| 1982 | Outstanding Individual Achievement - Special Class (Note: As a juried award, nominees had to garner 50% approval to win the award.) | | | |
| 1982 | Fame | "The Strike" | Marilyn Matthews | NBC |
| 1983 | Wizards and Warriors | "Dungeon of Death" | Theadora Van Runkle | CBS |
| 1983 | Dynasty | "La Mirage" | Nolan Miller | ABC |
| 1983 | Filthy Rich | "Town and Gown" | Warden Neil | CBS |
| 1983 | Mama's Family | "Wedding, Part 2" | Bob Mackie, Ret Turner | NBC |
| 1983 | Tales of the Gold Monkey | "Nakajima Kill" | Jean-Pierre Dorléac | ABC |
| 1984 | Dynasty | "The Wedding" | Nolan Miller | ABC |
| 1984 | Mama's Family | "Mama's Birthday" | Bob Mackie, Ret Turner | NBC |
| 1985 | Dallas | "Swan Song" | Travilla | CBS |
| 1985 | Dynasty | "Royal Wedding" | Nolan Miller | ABC |
| 1985 | Eye to Eye | "The Dick and Tracy" | Ret Turner | ABC |
| 1985 | Miami Vice | "No Exit" | Jodie Lynn Tillen | NBC |
1986
| 1986 | Outstanding Individual Achievement in Costume Design for a Series | | | |
| 1986 | Murder, She Wrote | "Widow, Weep for Me" | Al Lehman | CBS |
| 1986 | Dallas | "Blast from the Past" | Travilla | CBS |
| 1986 | Dynasty | "The Vendetta" | Nolan Miller | ABC |
| 1986 | The Golden Girls | "Nice and Easy" | Judy Evans | NBC |
| 1986 | Moonlighting | "The Dream Sequence Always Rings Twice" | Robert Turturice | ABC |
| 1986 | Outstanding Individual Achievement in Costuming for a Series | | | |
| 1986 | St. Elsewhere | "Time Heals" | Susan Smith, Robert M. Moore, Charles Drayman, Anne Hartley, Kathy O'Rear | NBC |
| 1986 | Amazing Stories | "Gather Ye Acorns" | Joseph Roveto, Jane Ruhm, James Cullen, Fran Vega-Buck | NBC |
| 1986 | Amazing Stories | "Ghost Train" | Sanford Slepak, Carol Hybi, Daniel Grant North, Deahdra Scarano | NBC |
| 1986 | Night Court | "Halloween, Too" | Dan Frank, Molly Harris Campbell | NBC |
| 1986 | Scarecrow and Mrs. King | "Welcome to America, Mr. Brand" | Molly Harris Campbell, James Lapidus | CBS |
1987
| 1987 | Outstanding Individual Achievement in Costume Design for a Series | | | |
| 1987 | Moonlighting | "Atomic Shakespeare" | Robert Turturice | ABC |
| 1987 | Designing Women | "Oh Suzannah" | Cliff Chally | CBS |
| 1987 | Mama's Family | "The Love Letter" | Bob Mackie, Ret Turner | Syndicated |
| 1987 | Murder, She Wrote | "Magnum on Ice" | Al Lehman | CBS |
| 1987 | My Sister Sam | "Jingle Bell Rock Bottom" | Bill Hargate | CBS |
| 1987 | Outstanding Individual Achievement in Costuming for a Series | | | |
| 1987 | Fame | "All Talking, All Singing, All Dancing" | Nanrose Buchman | Syndicated |
| 1987 | The Charmings | "Modern Romance" | Betsey Potter | ABC |
| 1987 | L.A. Law | "The Venus Butterfly" | Shelly Levine, Loree Parral | NBC |
| 1987 | Night Court | "A Day in the Life" | Dan Frank, Molly Harris Campbell | NBC |
1988
| 1988 | Outstanding Individual Achievement in Costume Design for a Series | | | |
| 1988 | Star Trek: The Next Generation | "The Big Goodbye" | William Ware Theiss | Syndicated |
| 1988 | Beauty and the Beast | "The Alchemist" | Judy Evans | CBS |
| 1988 | Frank's Place | "Frank Returns" | Pat Welch | CBS |
| 1988 | Moonlighting | "Here's Living with You, Kid" | Robert Turturice | ABC |
| 1988 | Murder, She Wrote | "A Fashionable Way to Die" | Al Lehman | CBS |
| 1988 | Outstanding Individual Achievement in Costuming for a Series | | | |
| 1988 | China Beach | "Pilot" | Paula Lynn Kaatz, Darryl Levine | ABC |
| 1988 | Head of the Class | "That'll Be The Day" | Bridget Ostersehlte, Steve Sharp | ABC |
| 1988 | L.A. Law | "Full Marital Jacket" | Shelly Levine, Loree Parral | NBC |
| 1988 | thirtysomething | "Pilot" | Marilyn Matthews, Patrick R. Norris | ABC |
| 1988 | thirtysomething | "Whose Forest Is This?" | Patrick R. Norris, Marjorie K. Chan, Anne Hartley, Julie Glick | ABC |
1989
| 1989 | Outstanding Individual Achievement in Costume Design for a Series | | | |
| 1989 | Beauty and the Beast | "The Outsiders" | Judy Evans | CBS |
| 1989 | Designing Women | "Come on and Marry Me, Bill" | Cliff Chally | CBS |
| 1989 | Murphy Brown | "Soul Man" | Bill Hargate | CBS |
| 1989 | Star Trek: The Next Generation | "Elementary, Dear Data" | William Ware Theiss, Durinda Wood | Syndicated |
| 1989 | The Wonder Years | "Birthday Boy" | Scilla Andreen-Hernandez | ABC |
| 1989 | Outstanding Individual Achievement in Costuming for a Series | | | |
| 1989 | thirtysomething | "We'll Meet Again" | Patrick R. Norris, Julie Glick | ABC |
| 1989 | China Beach | "The World, Part 2" | Paula Lynn Kaatz, Darryl Levine | ABC |
| 1989 | L.A. Law | "Urine Trouble Now" | Shelly Levine, Loree Parral | NBC |

=== 1990s ===
| Year | Program | Episode | Nominees | Network |
|---|---|---|---|---|
1990 (Note: As of January 2024, the pages for the 1990s on the Academy of Television Arts & Sciences website shows the nominees and winners for Costuming for a Series and Costume Design for a Series under a single title ("Costuming for a Series" from 1990 to 1992, "Costume Design for a Series" thereafter), using a single URL for a generic "costumes-for-a-series".) (Note: Franks' book confirms distinct winners for categories Costuming for a Series and Costume Design for a Series. See the page links, in reference, to pages 106 (for 1990), 113 (for 1991), 120 (for 1992) and 127 (for 1993).)
| 1990 | Outstanding Costume Design for a Series | | | |
| 1990 | Twin Peaks | "Pilot" | Patricia Norris | ABC |
| 1990 | Beauty and the Beast | "Though Lovers Be Lost" | Judy Evans | CBS |
| 1990 | Designing Women | "The Rowdy Girls" | Cliff Chally | CBS |
| 1990 | Murphy Brown | "Brown Like Me" | Bill Hargate | CBS |
| 1990 | Quantum Leap | "Sea Bride" | Jean-Pierre Dorléac | NBC |
| 1990 | Outstanding Achievement in Costuming for a Series | | | |
| 1990 | The Young Riders | "The Kid" | Frances Harrison Hays | ABC |
| 1990 | China Beach | "Magic" | Paula Lynn Kaatz, Tom Dawson | ABC |
| 1990 | L.A. Law | "Last Gasp" | Shelly Levine, Loree Parral | NBC |
| 1990 | Married... with Children | "Raingirl" | Marti M. Squyres | Fox |
| 1990 | thirtysomething | "Strangers" | Patrick R. Norris, Julie Glick | ABC |
1991
| 1991 | Outstanding Costume Design for a Series | | | |
| 1991 | Murphy Brown | "Eldin Imitates Life" | Bill Hargate | ABC |
| 1991 | Dark Shadows | "Episode 6" | Rosalie Wallace | NBC |
| 1991 | Designing Women | "Keep the Home Fires Burning" | Cliff Chally | CBS |
| 1991 | Quantum Leap | "Glitter Rock - April 12, 1974" | Jean-Pierre Dorléac | NBC |
| 1991 | Star Trek: The Next Generation | "Devil's Due" | Robert Blackman | Syndicated |
| 1991 | Outstanding Achievement in Costuming for a Series | | | |
| 1991 | thirtysomething | "A Wedding" | Patrick R. Norris, Linda Serijan | ABC |
| 1991 | China Beach | "Juice" | Paula Lynn Kaatz, Tom Dawson | ABC |
| 1991 | L.A. Law | "God Rest Ye Murray Gentleman" | Shelly Levine, Loree Parral, Elaine Ramires | NBC |
| 1991 | Married... with Children | "Married... with Aliens" | Marti M. Squyres | Fox |
1992
| 1992 | Outstanding Costume Design for a Series | | | |
| 1992 | Star Trek: The Next Generation | "Cost of Living" | Robert Blackman | Syndicated |
| 1992 | Brooklyn Bridge | "War of the Worlds" | Linda M. Bass | CBS |
| 1992 | I'll Fly Away | "The Slightest Distance" | Tom McKinley | NBC |
| 1992 | P.S. I Luv U | "What's Up Bugsy" | Jerry Skeels | CBS |
| 1992 | Quantum Leap | "A Single Drop of Rain" | Jean-Pierre Dorléac | NBC |
| 1992 | Outstanding Achievement in Costuming for a Series | | | |
| 1992 | Homefront | "At Your Age" | Chic Gennarelli, Lyn Paolo | ABC |
| 1992 | China Beach | "Hello-Goodbye" | Paula Lynn Kaatz, Tom Dawson | ABC |
| 1992 | L.A. Law | "Double Breasted Suit" | Robert Q. Mathews, Elinor Bardach, Deborah Squires | NBC |
| 1992 | MacGyver | "Good Knight MacGyver, Part 1" | Thomas Welsh, Bernadette O'Brien | ABC |
1993
| 1993 | Outstanding Individual Achievement in Costume Design for a Series | | | |
| 1993 | Star Trek: The Next Generation | "Time's Arrow, Part 2" | Robert Blackman | Syndicated |
| 1993 | The Young Indiana Jones Chronicles | "Young Indiana Jones and the Scandal of 1920" | Peggy Farrell | ABC |
| 1993 | Dr. Quinn, Medicine Woman | "Pilot" | Brienne Glyttov | CBS |
| 1993 | I'll Fly Away | "The Third Man" | Tom McKinley | NBC |
| 1993 | Quantum Leap | "Lee Harvey Oswald" | Jean-Pierre Dorléac | NBC |
| 1993 | Outstanding Individual Achievement in Costuming for a Series | | | |
| 1993 | Homefront | "Like Being There When You're Not" | Chic Gennarelli, Lyn Paolo | ABC |
| 1993 | Murder, She Wrote | "Petrified Florist" | Eilish Zebrasky, Buffy Snyder, Jim O'Daniel | CBS |
| 1993 | Picket Fences | "Pageantry" | Shelly Levine, Loree Parral | CBS |
1994
| 1994 | Outstanding Individual Achievement in Costume Design for a Series | | | |
| 1994 | The House of Eliott | "Episode 1" | Joan Wadge | A&E |
| 1994 | Dr. Quinn, Medicine Woman | "Where the Heart Is" | Brienne Glyttov | CBS |
| 1994 | A League of Their Own | "Marathon" | Diana Eden | CBS |
| 1994 | Star Trek: The Next Generation | "All Good Things..." | Robert Blackman, Abram Waterhouse | Syndicated |
| 1994 | Tales from the Crypt | "Well Cooked Hams" | Warden Neil | HBO |
| 1994 | The Young Indiana Jones Chronicles | "Paris, 1919" | Charlotte Holdich | ABC |
| 1994 | Outstanding Individual Achievement in Costuming for a Series | | | |
| 1994 | Picket Fences | "Dairy Queen" | Shelly Levine, Loree Parral | CBS |
| 1994 | Married... with Children | "Take My Wife, Please" | Marti M. Squyres | Fox |
1995
| 1995 | Outstanding Individual Achievement in Costume Design for a Series | | | |
| 1995 | Road to Avonlea | "Strictly Melodrama" | Madeleine Stewart | Disney |
| 1995 | Cybill | "As the World Turns to Crap" | Robert Turturice | CBS |
| 1995 | One West Waikiki | "Scales of Justice" | Jerry Skeels | CBS |
| 1995 | Star Trek: Voyager | "Caretaker" | Robert Blackman | UPN |
| 1995 | Tales from the Crypt | "Whirlpool" | Warden Neil | HBO |
| 1995 | Outstanding Individual Achievement in Costuming for a Series | | | |
| 1995 | The Nanny | "Canasta Masta" | Brenda Cooper | CBS |
| 1995 | Picket Fences | "The Song of Rome" | Shelly Levine, Loree Parral | CBS |
| 1995 | Lois & Clark: The New Adventures of Superman | "That Old Gang of Mine" | Darryl Levine, Judith Brewer Curtis | ABC |
| 1995 | Murder, She Wrote | "Murder a La Mode" | Shannon Litten, Eilish Zebrasky, Don Vargas | CBS |
1996
| 1996 | Outstanding Costume Design for a Series | | | |
| 1996 | Remember WENN | "Hillary Booth Registered Nurse" | Carolyn Grifel | AMC |
| 1996 | Dr. Quinn, Medicine Woman | "When a Child Is Born, Part 1" | Cheri Ingle | CBS |
| 1996 | Road to Avonlea | "What a Tangled Web We Weave" | Madeleine Stewart | Disney |
| 1996 | Sisters | "Don't Go to Springfield" | Rachael Stanley | NBC |
| 1996 | Star Trek: Deep Space Nine | "The Muse" | Robert Blackman | Syndicated |
| 1996 | Outstanding Costuming for a Series | | | |
| 1996 | Cybill | "Where's Zoey?" | Leslie Simmons-Potts, Marion Kirk, Daniel Grant North | CBS |
| 1996 | JAG | "Smoked" | L. Paul Dafelmair | NBC |
| 1996 | The Nanny | "The Kibbutz" | Brenda Cooper | CBS |
| 1996 | Picket Fences | "Three Weddings and a Meltdown" | Shelly Levine, Loree Parral | CBS |
1997
| 1997 | Outstanding Costume Design for a Series | | | |
| 1997 | 3rd Rock from the Sun | "A Nightmare on Dick Street" | Melina Root | NBC |
| 1997 | The Drew Carey Show | "New York and Queens" | Julie Rhine | ABC |
| 1997 | Remember WENN | "The Diva That Wouldn't Die" | Carolyn Grifel | AMC |
| 1997 | Road to Avonlea | "Woman of Importance" | Ruth Secord | Disney |
| 1997 | Sabrina the Teenage Witch | "Third Aunt from the Sun" | Dianne Kennedy | ABC |
| 1997 | Star Trek: Voyager | "False Profits" | Robert Blackman | UPN |
| 1997 | Outstanding Costuming for a Series | | | |
| 1997 | JAG | "Cowboys & Cossacks" | L. Paul Dafelmair | CBS |
| 1997 | The Nanny | "The Facts of Life" | Shawn Holly Cookson, Terry Gordon | CBS |
| 1997 | The Nanny | "The Rosie Show" | Brenda Cooper | CBS |
| 1997 | NewsRadio | "Awards Show" | Luellyn Harper | NBC |
1998
| 1998 | Outstanding Costume Design for a Series | | | |
| 1998 | The Magnificent Seven | "Working Girls" | Dan Moore | CBS |
| 1998 | Frasier | "Halloween" | Audrey M. Bansmer | NBC |
| 1998 | Remember WENN | "From the Pen of Gertrude Reece" | Carolyn Grifel | AMC |
| 1998 | Star Trek: Deep Space Nine | "Far Beyond the Stars" | Robert Blackman | Syndicated |
| 1998 | 3rd Rock from the Sun | "36! 24! 36! Dick!" | Melina Root | NBC |
| 1998 | Outstanding Costuming for a Series | | | |
| 1998 | NewsRadio | "Sinking Ship" | Luellyn Harper, Carol Lupo | NBC |
| 1998 | Ally McBeal | "Cro-Magnon" | Loree Parral, Shelly Levine, Michelle Roth | Fox |
| 1998 | The Nanny | "Not Without My Nanny" | Shawn Holly Cookson, Terry Gordon | CBS |
1999
| 1999 | Outstanding Costume Design for a Series | | | |
| 1999 | That '70s Show | "That Disco Episode" | Melina Root | Fox |
| 1999 | Ally McBeal | "Making Spirits Bright" | Rachael Stanley | Fox |
| 1999 | Friends | "The One with All the Thanksgivings" | Debra McGuire | NBC |
| 1999 | Law & Order | "Refuge" | Jennifer von Mayrhauser | NBC |
| 1999 | The Magnificent Seven | "Vendetta" | Dan Moore | CBS |
| 1999 | Remember WENN | "The Follies of WENN" | Marie Abma | AMC |
| 1999 | Outstanding Costuming for a Series | | | |
| 1999 | JAG | "Gypsy Eyes" | L. Paul Dafelmair | CBS |
| 1999 | The Nanny | "Oh Say, Can You Ski?" | Shawn Holly Cookson, Terry Gordon | CBS |
| 1999 | The Practice | "Of Human Bondage" | Shelly Levine, Loree Parral | ABC |

=== 2000s ===
| Year | Program | Episode | Nominees | Network |
|---|---|---|---|---|
| 2000 | Providence | "Syd in Wonderland" | Sandy Kenyon, Giovanna Ottobre-Melton | NBC |
| 2000 | Any Day Now | "It's Not About the Butter" | Mary-Anne Aston, Elizabeth Palmer | Lifetime |
| 2000 | Sex and the City | "La Douleur Exquise!" | Patricia Field, Molly Rogers, Rebecca Weinberg | HBO |
| 2000 | The Sopranos | "Commendatori" | Gail A. Fitzgibbons, Kevin P. Faherty, Juliet Polcsa, Lauren Press, Kim Wilcox | HBO |
| 2000 | Star Trek: Voyager | "Muse" | Robert Blackman, Carol Kunz | UPN |
| 2000 | The West Wing | "The State Dinner" | Alice Daniels, Lyn Paolo | NBC |
| 2001 | The Lot | "Mob Scene" | Jean-Pierre Dorléac, Gilberto Mello | AMC |
| 2001 | Sex and the City | "Sex and Another City" | Kevin Draves, Patricia Field, Molly Rogers, Rebecca Weinberg | HBO |
| 2001 | The Sopranos | "Proshai, Livushka" | Juliet Polcsa, Lauren Press, Kim Wilcox | HBO |
| 2001 | Star Trek: Voyager | "Shattered" | Robert Blackman, Carol Kunz | UPN |
| 2001 | Will & Grace | "Lows in the Mid-Eighties" | Lori Eskowitz, Mary Walbridge | NBC |
| 2002 | Sex and the City | "Defining Moments" | Mark Agnes, Eric Daman, Kevin Draves, Patricia Field, Artie Hach, Molly Rogers, Rebecca Weinberg | HBO |
| 2002 | Alias | "Truth Be Told" | Anne Hartley, Linda Serijan | ABC |
| 2002 | Farscape | "Into the Lion's Den: Lambs to the Slaughter" | Lyn Askew, Terry Ryan | Sci Fi |
| 2002 | Six Feet Under | "Back to the Garden" | Carlos Brown, Lucinda Campbell, Gail McMullen | HBO |
| 2002 | That '70s Show | "That '70s Musical" | Johnny Foam, Melina Root | Fox |
| 2002 | Will & Grace | "A Movable Feast" | Lori Eskowitz, Mary Walbridge | NBC |
| 2003 | American Dreams | "Where the Boys Are" | Chris Burrows, Chrisi Karvonides-Dushenko | NBC |
| 2003 | Alias | "Phase One" | Laura Goldsmith, Wendy J. Greiner, Leslie Herman | ABC |
| 2003 | Sex and the City | "I Love a Charade" | Mark Agnes, Patricia Field, Artie Hach, Molly Rogers, Wendy Stephanelli, Patricia Trujillo | HBO |
| 2003 | Six Feet Under | "Tears, Bones and Desire" | Danielle Launzel, Jill M. Ohanneson, Bridget Ostersehlte | HBO |
| 2003 | That '70s Show | "Ramble On" | Johnny Foam, Melina Root | Fox |
| 2004 | Carnivàle | "Milfay" | Lucinda Campbell, Terry Dresbach, Linda Henrikson, Ruth Myers, Niklas J. Palm | HBO |
| 2004 | Deadwood | "Mr. Wu" | Katherine Jane Bryant, Le Dawson, Beth Morgan | HBO |
| 2004 | Sex and the City | "An American Girl in Paris, Part Deux" | Mark Agnes, Mei Lai Hippisley Coxe, Patricia Field, Molly Rogers, Wendy Stephanelli, Patricia Trujillo | HBO |
| 2004 | The Sopranos | "Rat Pack" | Lorraine Calvert, Elizabeth Feldbauer, Barbara Hause, Juliet Polcsa, Lauren Press | HBO |
| 2004 | That '70s Show | "Do You Think It's Alright?" | Johnny Foam, Melina Root | Fox |
| 2005 | Deadwood | "Boy the Earth Talks To" | Katherine Jane Bryant, Le Dawson | HBO |
| 2005 | Alias | "Tuesday" | Laura Goldsmith, Leslie Herman, Christine Orth | ABC |
| 2005 | Carnivàle | "The Road to Damascus" | Chrisi Karvonides-Dushenko, Robin Roberts | HBO |
| 2005 | Desperate Housewives | "Suspicious Minds" | Catherine Adair, Joyce Unruh, Karo Vartanian | ABC |
| 2005 | Six Feet Under | "Grinding the Corn" | Jill M. Ohanneson, Bridget Ostersehlte | HBO |
| 2006 | Rome | "Triumph" | April Ferry, Augusto Grassi | HBO |
| 2006 | Battlestar Galactica | "Lay Down Your Burdens, Part 2" | Glenne Campbell, Cali Newcomen, Glenna Owen | Sci Fi |
| 2006 | Desperate Housewives | "Next" | Catherine Adair, Joyce Unruh, Karo Vartanian | ABC |
| 2006 | Everybody Hates Chris | "Everybody Hates the Pilot" | Darryle Johnson, Sharlene Williams | UPN |
| 2006 | The Sopranos | "Mr. & Mrs. John Sacrimoni Request..." | Elizabeth Feldbauer, Joseph La Corte, Juliet Polcsa | HBO |
| 2007 | The Tudors | "Wolsey, Wolsey, Wolsey!" | Joan Bergin, Ger Scully, Jessica O'Leary | Showtime |
| 2007 | Deadwood | "Amateur Night" | Katherine Jane Bryant, Le Dawson | HBO |
| 2007 | Desperate Housewives | "Getting Married Today" | Catherine Adair, Joyce Unruh, Karo Vartanian | ABC |
| 2007 | Rome | "De Patre Vostro (About Your Father)" | April Ferry, Augusto Grassi, Uliva Pizzetti | HBO |
| 2007 | Ugly Betty | "I'm Coming Out" | Eduardo Castro, Michael R. Chapman | ABC |
| 2008 | The Tudors | "Tears of Blood" | Joan Bergin, Jessica O'Leary, Susan O'Connor Cave | Showtime |
| 2008 | Desperate Housewives | "In Buddy's Eyes" | Catherine Adair, Joyce Unruh, Karo Vartanian | ABC |
| 2008 | Mad Men | "Smoke Gets in Your Eyes" | John A. Dunn | AMC |
| 2008 | Pushing Daisies | "Pie-lette" | Stephanie Fox, Mary E. Vogt | ABC |
| 2008 | Ugly Betty | "Bananas for Betty" | Eduardo Castro, Michael R. Chapman | ABC |
| 2009 | Pushing Daisies | "Bzzzzzzzzz!" | Robert Blackman, Carol Kunz | ABC |
| 2009 | Mad Men | "Meditations in an Emergency" | Janie Bryant, Le Dawson | AMC |
| 2009 | The No. 1 Ladies' Detective Agency | "Pilot" | Jo Katsaras, Zureta Schulz | HBO |
| 2009 | The Tudors | "Protestant Anne of Cleves" | Joan Bergin, Susan O'Connor Cave | Showtime |
| 2009 | Ugly Betty | "In the Stars" | Patricia Field, Molly Rogers | ABC |

=== 2010s ===
| Year | Program | Episode | Nominees | Network |
|---|---|---|---|---|
| 2010 | The Tudors | "As It Should Be" | Joan Bergin, Susan O'Connor Cave | Showtime |
| 2010 | Glee | "The Power of Madonna" | Marisa Aboitiz, Lou A. Eyrich | Fox |
| 2010 | The Good Wife | "Crash" | Jennifer Rogien Faletti, Daniele Hollywood, Daniel Lawson | CBS |
| 2010 | Mad Men | "Souvenir" | Janie Bryant, Le Dawson | AMC |
| 2010 | 30 Rock | "I Do Do" | Joanna Brett, Tom Broecker, Remy Pearce | NBC |
| 2011 | The Borgias | "Lucrezia's Wedding" | Gabriella Pescucci, Uliva Pizzetti | Showtime |
| 2011 | Boardwalk Empire | "Anastasia" | John Dunn, Courtney McClain, Chris Peterson | HBO |
| 2011 | Game of Thrones | "The Pointy End" | Michele Clapton, Rachael Webb-Crozier | HBO |
| 2011 | Glee | "New York City" | Marisa Aboitiz, Lou A. Eyrich | Fox |
| 2011 | Mad Men | "The Beautiful Girls" | Janie Bryant, Le Dawson | AMC |
| 2012 | Game of Thrones | "The Prince of Winterfell" | Michele Clapton, Alexander Fordham, Chloe Aubry | HBO |
| 2012 | Boardwalk Empire | "21" | John Dunn, Maria Zamansky | HBO |
| 2012 | The Borgias | "The Confession" | Gabriella Pescucci, Uliva Pizzetti | Showtime |
| 2012 | Downton Abbey | "Episode One" | Susannah Buxton | PBS |
| 2012 | Once Upon a Time | "Hat Trick" | Eduardo Castro, Monique McRae | ABC |
| 2013 | The Borgias | "The Gunpowder Plot" | Gabriella Pescucci, Uliva Pizzetti, and Gábor Homonnay | Showtime |
| 2013 | Boardwalk Empire | "Resolution" | John Dunn, Maria Zamansky | HBO |
| 2013 | Downton Abbey | "Episode Four" | Caroline McCall, Dulcie Scott | PBS |
| 2013 | Game of Thrones | "Walk of Punishment" | Michele Clapton, Alexander Fordham, Chloe Aubry | HBO |
| 2013 | Once Upon a Time | "Queen of Hearts" | Eduardo Castro, Monique McRae | ABC |
| 2014 | Game of Thrones | "The Lion and the Rose" | Michele Clapton, Sheena Wichary, Alexander Fordham, Nina Ayres | HBO |
| 2014 | Boardwalk Empire | "New York Sour" | John Dunn, Lisa Padovani, Joseph La Corte | HBO |
| 2014 | Downton Abbey | "Episode Eight" | Caroline McCall, Heather Leat, Poli Kyriacou | PBS |
| 2014 | Mad Men | "Time Zones" | Janie Bryant, Tiffany White Stanton, Stacy Horn | AMC |
| 2014 | Once Upon a Time | "A Curious Thing" | Eduardo Castro, Monique McRae | ABC |

== Designers with multiple awards ==
3 awards

- Joan Bergin
- Robert Blackman

2 awards

- Susan O'Connor Cave
- Michele Clapton
- L. Paul Dafelmair
- Jean-Pierre Dorleac
- Peggy Farrell
- Alexander Fordham
- Chic Gennarelli
- Shelly Levine
- Bob Mackie
- Patrick R. Norris
- Jessica O'Leary
- Lyn Paolo
- Loree Parral
- Gabriella Pescucci
- Uliva Pizzetti
- Melina Root

== Programs with multiple wins ==
3 wins

- Star Trek: The Next Generation
- The Tudors

2 wins

- The Borgias
- Fame
- Game of Thrones
- Homefront
- JAG
- Picket Fences
- thirtysomething

== Programs with multiple nominations ==
6 nominations

- L.A. Law
- The Nanny
- Star Trek: The Next Generation

5 nominations

- China Beach
- Mad Men
- Murder, She Wrote
- Sex and the City
- thirtysomething

4 nominations

- Boardwalk Empire
- Designing Women
- Desperate Housewives
- Dynasty
- Game of Thrones
- Picket Fences
- Quantum Leap
- Remember WENN
- The Sopranos
- Star Trek: Voyager
- That '70s Show
- The Tudors

3 nominations

- Alias
- Beauty and the Beast
- The Borgias
- Deadwood
- Downton Abbey
- Dr. Quinn, Medicine Woman
- JAG
- Mama's Family
- Married... with Children
- Moonlighting
- Murphy Brown
- Once Upon a Time
- Road to Avonlea
- Six Feet Under
- Ugly Betty

2 nominations

- Ally McBeal
- Amazing Stories
- Carnivàle
- Cybill
- Dallas
- Fame
- Fantasy Island
- Glee
- Homefront
- I'll Fly Away
- The Magnificent Seven
- NewsRadio
- Night Court
- Pushing Daisies
- Rome
- Scarecrow and Mrs. King
- Star Trek: Deep Space Nine
- Tales from the Crypt
- 3rd Rock from the Sun
- Will & Grace
- The Young Indiana Jones Chronicles
