= Peggy Farrell =

Peggy Farrell may refer to:

- Peggy Farrell (politician) (1920–2003), Irish businesswoman and Fianna Fáil politician
- Peggy Farrell (costume designer) (1932–2021), American costume designer
