= Debra Hanson =

Canadian set and costume designer

- Born: Canada
- Occupations: Set designer, costume designer
- Years active: 1998–present

Debra Hanson is a Canadian set designer and costume designer.

== Life and career ==
Hanson graduated from Dalhousie University and the National Theatre School of Canada. She designed 32 productions at the Stratford Festival of Canada as Head of the Design line. Her opera credits include Jenufa and Cosi fan tutte.

== Selected filmography ==
- 2021 – The Handmaid's Tale
- 2015-2020 – Schitt's Creek
- 2017-2018 – Frankie Drake Mysteries
- 2014-2017 – Orphan Black
- 2015 – Remember
- 2013 – Bomb Girls
- 2012 – The Firm
- 2011 – Combat Hospital
- 2010 – Casino Jack
- 2009 – Chloe

== Awards and nominations ==
Year	Result	Award	Category	Work	Ref.
2022	Nominated	Costume Designers Guild Awards	Excellence in Sci-Fi/Fantasy Television	The Handmaid's Tale	
2021	Won	Costume Designers Guild Awards	Excellence in Contemporary Television	Schitt's Creek	
2021	Won	Canadian Screen Awards	Best Costume Design	Schitt's Creek	
2021	Nominated	Primetime Emmy Awards	Outstanding Fantasy/Sci-Fi Costumes	The Handmaid's Tale	
2020	Won	Primetime Emmy Awards	Outstanding Contemporary Costumes	Schitt's Creek	
2020	Nominated	Canadian Screen Awards	Best Costume Design	Schitt's Creek	
2020	Won	Costume Designers Guild Awards	Excellence in Contemporary Television	Schitt's Creek	
2019	Nominated	Primetime Emmy Awards	Outstanding Contemporary Costumes	Schitt's Creek	
2019	Nominated	Canadian Screen Awards	Best Costume Design (TV)	Schitt's Creek	
2019	Won	Canadian Screen Awards	Best Costume Design (TV)	Frankie Drake Mysteries	
2013	Nominated	Canadian Screen Awards	Best Costume Design	The Firm	
2009	Won	Gemini Awards	Best Costume Design	Othello the Tragedy of the Moor	
2007	Won	Gemini Awards	Best Costume Design	Roxana	
2004	Nominated	Genie Awards	Best Achievement in Costume Design	The Gospel of John	
2003	Won	Gemini Awards	Best Production Design	Stormy Weather: The Music of Harold Arlen	
2001	Nominated	Genie Awards	Best Achievement in Costume Design	New Waterford Girl	
