= Michael Travis =

Michael Travis may refer to:

- Michael Travis (musician) (born 1965), member of the band The String Cheese Incident
- Michael Travis (soccer) (born 1993), South African footballer
- Michael Travis (costume designer) (1928–2014), American costume designer
- Mick Travis, a fictional English character played by Malcolm McDowell
