= Diana Eden =

Canadian costume designer (born 1940)

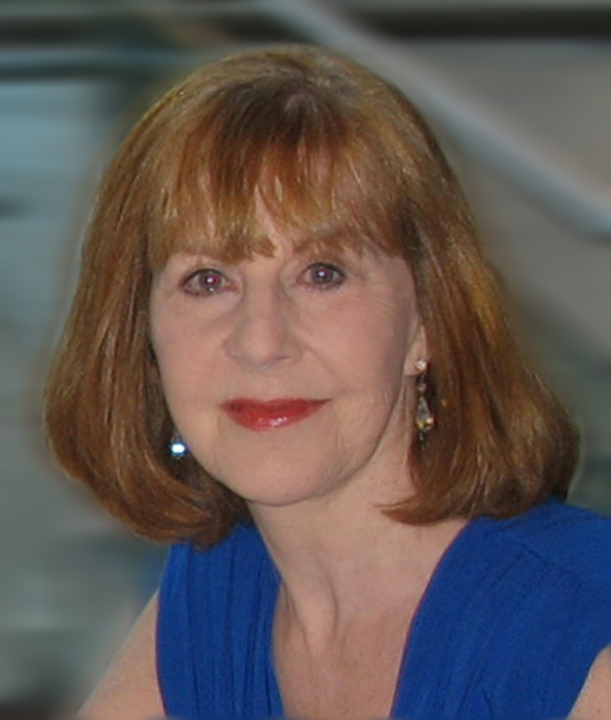
- Born: 1940 (age 85–86)
- Education: University of Toronto
- Occupation: Costume designer
- Awards: Nominee for a Primetime Emmy Award and two Daytime Emmy Awards; winner of a Los Angeles Drama Critics Circle Award

Diana Eden (née Diana Moore Ede, born 1940) is a Canadian costume designer for the stage, television, and film. She has been nominated for one Primetime Emmy Award and two Daytime Emmy Awards.

== Early life and career ==
Diana Eden was born "Diana Moore Ede" in Tunbridge Wells England in 1940, however her family moved to Toronto when she was ten years old. Her father was a British medical physician and her mother Canadian. Eden began dancing at the age of five and by the age of fifteen she participated in the touring performance of the Swan Lake organazied by National Ballet of Canada. She made her debut in the 1955 tour performance in Washington D.C. Eden grew too tall for ballet, despite being called "one of the National Ballet of Canada's most brilliant young dancers" by the Toronto Star.

She graduated from the University of Toronto with a BA in Art and Archaeology, and immediately upon graduation she joined the National Company of My Fair Lady as a dancer, and toured with the cast for a full year. She then moved to New York City to continue performing on Broadway. She performed in the musical Hot Spot among others, and in June 1964 Eden was cast in the Broadway musical Fade In, Fade Out featuring Carol Burnett. Additionally she had appeared in small roles on TV series The Nurses, and films The Producers and Valley of the Dolls. She began designing clothing in her spare time for her fellow dancers as early as 1964, and eventually moved to Los Angeles in 1969 to advance her career as an actress. She opened a small boutique near Melrose Avenue, selling clothing she designed.

== Costume design for the stage ==
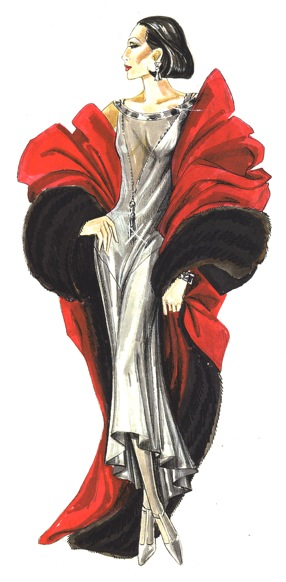
Costume sketch by Diana Eden for the stage show Tamara produced in New York City, which opened December 3, 1987.

In 1974, Eden began designing for stage shows, including a contract to provide some of the costumes for Ann-Margret and her dancers for their Las Vegas act at Caesars Palace. She eventually started getting contracts from touring or premiering stage plays. In 1980 she became a designer full-time and continued to design for the stage, including shows produced for Broadway. She also assisted Bob Mackie for the Las Vegas stage show Jubilee! as it entered the MGM Grand Hotel, working under Mackie at Elizabeth Courtney Designs. In 1984, she received a Los Angeles Drama Critics Circle Award for Costume Design for her work on the stage play Tamara.

== Costume design for television and film ==
From 1985 to the series end in 1988, Eden was the resident designer for the television sitcom The Facts of Life, designing up to forty original outfits per week for the show that featured. She also became the costume designer for the long-running television series Santa Barbara. In 1993, she was nominated for a Primetime Emmy Award for Outstanding Costumes for a Series for her work on the television series A League of Their Own.

In the mid-1990s, Eden was the costume designer for the television drama Sweet Justice, the sitcom Ned and Stacey and the television show Family Law, which aired between 1999 and 2002. She has also been the costume designer for the television soap opera Passions. In both 2007 and 2008, she was nominated for an Outstanding Achievement in Costume Design for a Drama Series Daytime Emmy award for her work on the show. Other shows Eden designed include The Tony Danza Show, For Your Love, and Ladies Man. Television and feature films she has designed include Making Contact, Stealing Christmas, and Stealing Las Vegas.

== Books ==
In 2002, Eden co-authored the book Retro Chic: A Guide to Fabulous Vintage and Designer Resale Shopping in North America and Online with Gloria Lintermans, a how-to manual for vintage shopping. Eden stated that her book strived to determine the most important elements of past eras in fashion in order to provide advice on specific retro looks in addition to tips about retro shopping.
