= Michael Travis (costume designer) =

American costume designer

- Born: Louis Torakis; April 13, 1928; Detroit, Michigan, U.S.
- Died: May 1, 2014 (aged 86); Studio City, California, U.S.
- Occupation: Costume designer

Louis Torakis (April 13, 1928 – May 1, 2014) was an American costume designer. He was nominated for a Primetime Emmy Award in the category Outstanding Costumes for his work on the television program Rowan & Martin's Laugh-In. Travis also designed costumes for Liberace, and gowns for The Supremes, most famously for their 1968 special, T.C.B, for Diana Ross and The Supremes and The Temptations, (Note: Official ATAS records list the title of the special as Diana Ross and The Supremes and The Temptations.) a 1968 television special produced by Motown Productions. He was honored in the Costume Designers Guild for the Career Achievement Award.

Torakis died on May 1, 2014 at his home in Studio City, California, at the age of 86.
