= 29th People's Choice Awards =

Pop culture award show held in 2003

- Date: January 12, 2003
- Location: Shrine Auditorium, Los Angeles, California
- Hosted by: Tony Danza

Television/radio coverage
- Network: CBS

The 29th People's Choice Awards, honoring the best in popular culture for 2002, were held on January 12, 2003, at the Shrine Auditorium in Los Angeles, California. They were hosted by Tony Danza, and broadcast on CBS.

== Awards ==
Winners are listed first, in bold.

Favorite New TV Comedy	Favorite Female Musical Performer
**8 Simple Rules for Dating My Teenage Daughter**; The Bernie Mac Show; Cedric the Entertainer Presents	**Faith Hill**; Céline Dion; Jennifer Lopez
Favorite Motion Picture	Favorite Daytime Serial
**The Lord of the Rings: The Fellowship of the Ring**; Spider-Man; My Big Fat Greek Wedding	**Days of Our Lives**; The Young and the Restless; All My Children
Favorite Male TV Performer	Favorite Male Musical Performer
**Ray Romano**; Matt LeBlanc; Bernie Mac	**Eminem**; Alan Jackson; Nelly
Favorite Musical Group Or Band	Favorite Reality/Game Show
Creed; **Dixie Chicks**; *NSYNC	**Survivor: Thailand**; Fear Factor; The Real World: Las Vegas
Favorite Comedy Motion Picture	Favorite Female TV Performer
**My Big Fat Greek Wedding**; Mr. Deeds; Barbershop	**Jennifer Aniston**; Patricia Heaton; Debra Messing
Favorite Motion Picture Actor	Favorite TV Comedy
**Mel Gibson**; Denzel Washington; Tom Hanks	**Friends**; Everybody Loves Raymond; Will & Grace
Favorite TV Drama	Favorite Motion Picture Actress
**CSI: Crime Scene Investigation**; ER; Law & Order	**Julia Roberts**; Halle Berry; Sandra Bullock
Favorite New TV Dramatic Series	Favorite Dramatic Motion Picture
**CSI: Miami**; Everwood; Presidio Med	**The Lord of the Rings: The Fellowship of the Ring**; Red Dragon; Signs
