= Luellyn Harper =

American costume designer

- Born: Luellyn Harper Thomas
- Occupation: Costume designer

Luellyn Harper Thomas is an American costume designer. She won a Primetime Emmy Award and was nominated for another one in the category Outstanding Costumes for her work on the television program, NewsRadio. She was the only person to win a Primetime Emmy Award for NewsRadio.
