= Daniel Orlandi =

American costume designer

- Born: New Jersey, U.S.
- Occupation: Costume designer
- Years active: 1979–present

Daniel Orlandi is an American costume designer for film and television who regularly collaborated with directors Joel Schumacher, Ron Howard and John Lee Hancock.

Born in New Jersey, Orlandi graduated from Carnegie Mellon University and began working Off-Broadway. He relocated to Los Angeles in 1980.

Orlandi won the Primetime Emmy Award for Outstanding Costumes for a Variety, Nonfiction, or Reality Programming for his work on a television special for the illusionist David Copperfield. He had received a BAFTA Award nomination for his work on Saving Mr. Banks.

Orlandi resides in Los Angeles, California.

== Filmography ==
Key
†	Denotes films that have not yet been released

Year	Title	Notes
1996	The Fan	
1999	Flawless	
2000	Meet the Parents	
2002	Phone Booth	
2003	Kangaroo Jack	
2003	Down with Love	
2003	My Boss's Daughter	
2004	The Alamo	
2005	Cinderella Man	
2006	Last Holiday	
2006	The Da Vinci Code	
2007	The Number 23	
2008	Frost/Nixon	
2009	Angels & Demons	
2009	The Marc Pease Experience	
2009	The Blind Side	
2011	The Dilemma	
2012	Game Change	
2012	The Campaign	
2013	Saving Mr. Banks	Nominated - BAFTA Award for Best Costume Design; Nominated - Costume Designers Guild Award for Excellence in Period Film; Nominated - Satellite Award for Best Costume Design
2014	The Normal Heart	Television film Nominated - Primetime Emmy Award for Outstanding Costumes for a Miniseries, Movie, or Special
2015	Jurassic World	
2015	Trumbo	Nominated - Costume Designers Guild Award for Excellence in Period Film
2016	The Founder	
2016	All the Way	Television film
2017	Logan	
2019	The Highwaymen	
2019	Dark Phoenix	
2019	Ford v Ferrari	
2021	The Little Things	
2021	The Guilty	
2022	Mr. Harrigan's Phone	
2024	Atlas	
2024	Borderlands	Nominated - Costume Designers Guild Award for Excellence in Sci-Fi/Fantasy Film
2024	Venom: The Last Dance	
