= The Lion and the Rose =

- Game of Thrones episode
- Joffrey Baratheon succumbs to poisoning in the arms of his mother, Cersei Lannister.
- Episode no.: Season 4 Episode 2
- Directed by: Alex Graves
- Written by: George R. R. Martin
- Cinematography by: Anette Haellmigk
- Editing by: Katie Weiland
- Original air date: April 13, 2014
- Running time: 52 minutes

Guest appearances
- Diana Rigg as Olenna Tyrell; Pedro Pascal as Oberyn Martell; Indira Varma as Ellaria Sand; Michael McElhatton as Roose Bolton; Noah Taylor as Locke; Tara Fitzgerald as Selyse Baratheon; Julian Glover as Grand Maester Pycelle; Roger Ashton-Griffiths as Mace Tyrell; Finn Jones as Loras Tyrell; Thomas Brodie-Sangster as Jojen Reed; Ellie Kendrick as Meera Reed; Kristian Nairn as Hodor; Dean-Charles Chapman as Tommen Baratheon; Daniel Portman as Podrick Payne; Ian Beattie as Ser Meryn Trant; Tony Way as Dontos Hollard; Kerry Ingram as Shireen Baratheon; Charlotte Hope as Myranda; Jazzy de Lisser as Tansy; Paul Bentley as the High Septon; Elizabeth Webster as Walda Bolton; James McHale as Axell Florent; Jón Þór Birgisson as a Musician; Georg Hólm as a Musician; Orri Páll Dýrason as a Musician

Episode chronology
← Previous "Two Swords"	Next → "Breaker of Chains"
- Game of Thrones season 4

"The Lion and the Rose" is the second episode of the fourth season of HBO's fantasy television series Game of Thrones, and the 32nd overall. The episode was written by George R. R. Martin, the author of the A Song of Ice and Fire novels from which the series is adapted, and directed by Alex Graves. It aired on April 13, 2014.

The episode focuses principally on the long-awaited royal wedding between Joffrey Baratheon (Jack Gleeson) and Margaery Tyrell (Natalie Dormer). It ends with Joffrey's death after drinking poisoned wine at the reception, a plot development that despite being in the books came as a shock to viewers since it abruptly killed the show's principal villain just a few episodes after the Red Wedding had violently killed off several of the show's protagonists. Other storylines include House Bolton's quest to retake the North, and Bran's continued journey north of The Wall. The title refers to the sigils of the wedding couple's respective houses – a lion for Joffrey Baratheon, who is in truth an illegitimate bastard, and a rose for Margaery Tyrell.

Unlike Martin's previous three episodes, his draft of the screenplay has some major differences from the episode as produced, with more minor characters and detail at the wedding feast. Most significantly, it sets up some plotlines from the books that the series would ultimately not use, such as Ramsay marrying an impostor woman posing as Arya instead of Sansa. It would have also resolved the unanswered question from the show's first season of who had been behind the attempted assassination of Bran Stark by implying more strongly than the books did that it was Joffrey, rather than Littlefinger as the series would suggest several seasons later.

"The Lion and the Rose" received widespread acclaim and was declared one of the best episodes of the series and one of the most satisfying episodes in television history, earning high praise for the writing, Gleeson's and Headey's performances, Joffrey and Margaery's wedding scene, suspenseful tone, and the final scene. It received five Emmy Award nominations, including Outstanding Cinematography for a Single-Camera Series, Outstanding Supporting Actress in a Drama Series for Lena Headey and Outstanding Guest Actress in a Drama Series for Diana Rigg, winning the award for Outstanding Costumes for a Series. Martin received a Writers Guild of America Award nomination for Television: Episodic Drama.

== Plot ==
=== At the Dreadfort ===
Ramsay hunts a woman with the assistance of his servant, Reek (formerly Theon), his bedwarmer Myranda, and his hounds. Roose and his wife, Walda, arrive at the Dreadfort. Roose, having intended to trade Theon to the Ironborn for Moat Cailin, is unable to do so and castigates Ramsay for torturing Theon. Ramsay demonstrates his brainwashing of Reek by being shaved by him while Ramsay coaxes out the true story about what happened to Bran and Rickon Stark. Roose orders Locke to eliminate the Stark boys, who pose a threat to his new position as Warden of the North. Ramsay suggests that they also kill Jon. Roose dispatches Locke to Castle Black, and orders Ramsay to retake Moat Cailin, hinting Ramsay may be legitimized if successful.

=== Beyond the Wall ===
After stopping at a weirwood, Bran has strange visions, including the same one of a ruined and snowbound Red Keep that Daenerys had in the House of the Undying, a dragon above King's Landing, a figure with glowing blue eyes approaching an altar made of ice, and a large weirwood further north, with a voice telling him to go there. He tells his companions he knows where they must go.

=== At Dragonstone ===
Melisandre orders several men burned at the stake, including Selyse's brother Ser Axell Florent, as a tribute to the Lord of Light. Melisandre speaks with Shireen about her faith.

=== In King's Landing ===
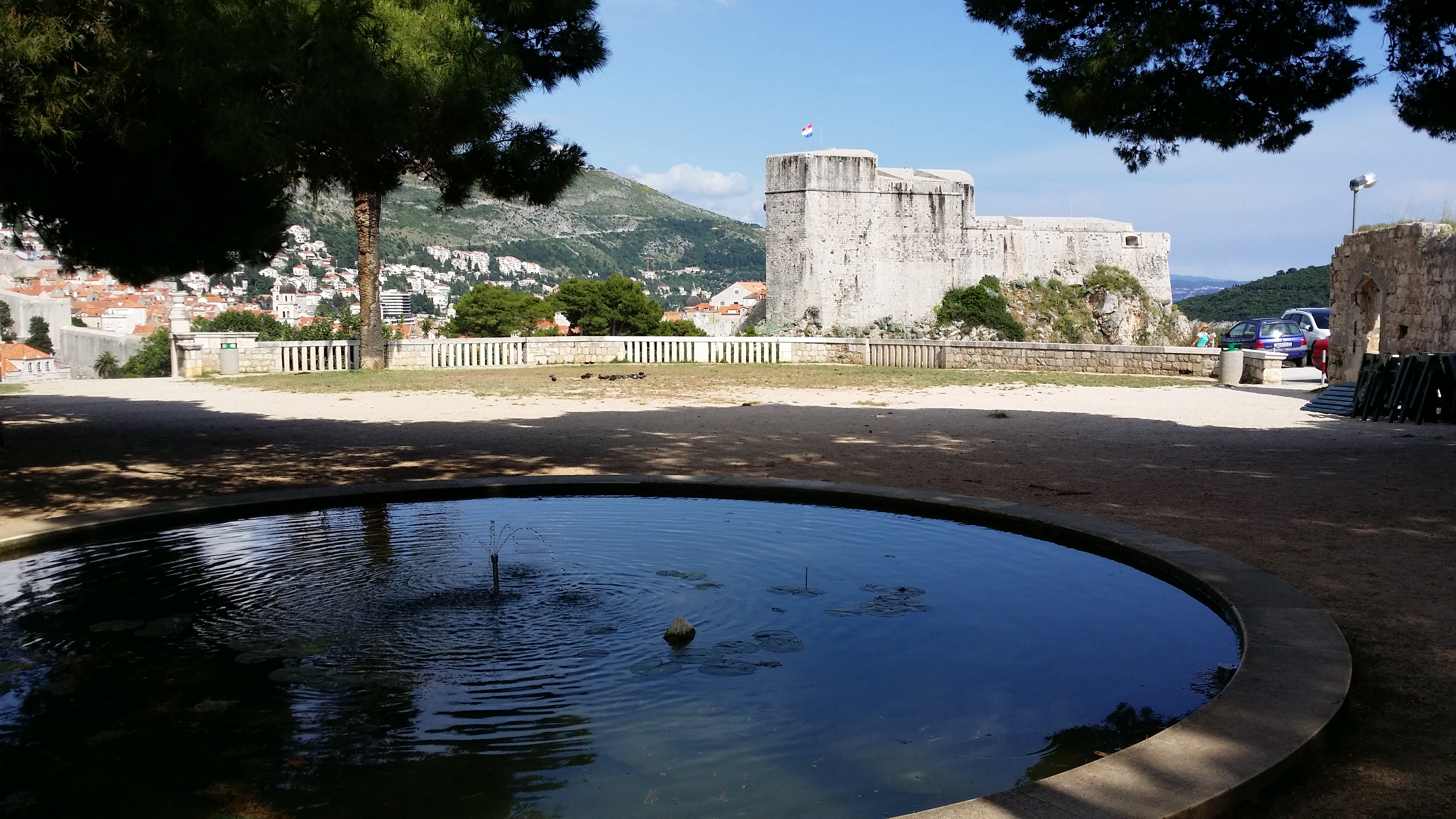
The wedding celebration was filmed in Gradac Park in Dubrovnik, Croatia.

Tyrion encourages Jaime to train his left hand with Bronn. Varys tells Tyrion that Cersei knows about Shae. After overhearing Cersei and Tywin discussing Shae, Tyrion orders Bronn to escort Shae to the boat to sail for Essos, but she refuses to leave until Tyrion calls her a whore.

Joffrey and Margaery are married at the Sept of Baelor, and the court returns to the Red Keep for the wedding feast. Jaime tells Loras that if he weds Cersei she would kill him in his sleep; Loras retorts with a remark about their incest. Cersei accuses Brienne of being in love with Jaime. Oberyn and his paramour, Ellaria Sand, trade thinly veiled insults with Cersei and Tywin.

Joffrey presents a crude play with dwarves depicting the War of the Five Kings and suggests that Tyrion participate. Embarrassed by Tyrion's witty response, Joffrey belittles Tyrion into being his cupbearer. Margaery defuses the tension, but then Joffrey begins choking. During the commotion, Dontos tells Sansa to flee with him. As he dies, Joffrey points accusingly at Tyrion and a grief-stricken Cersei orders him arrested for poisoning the king.

== Production ==
=== Writing ===
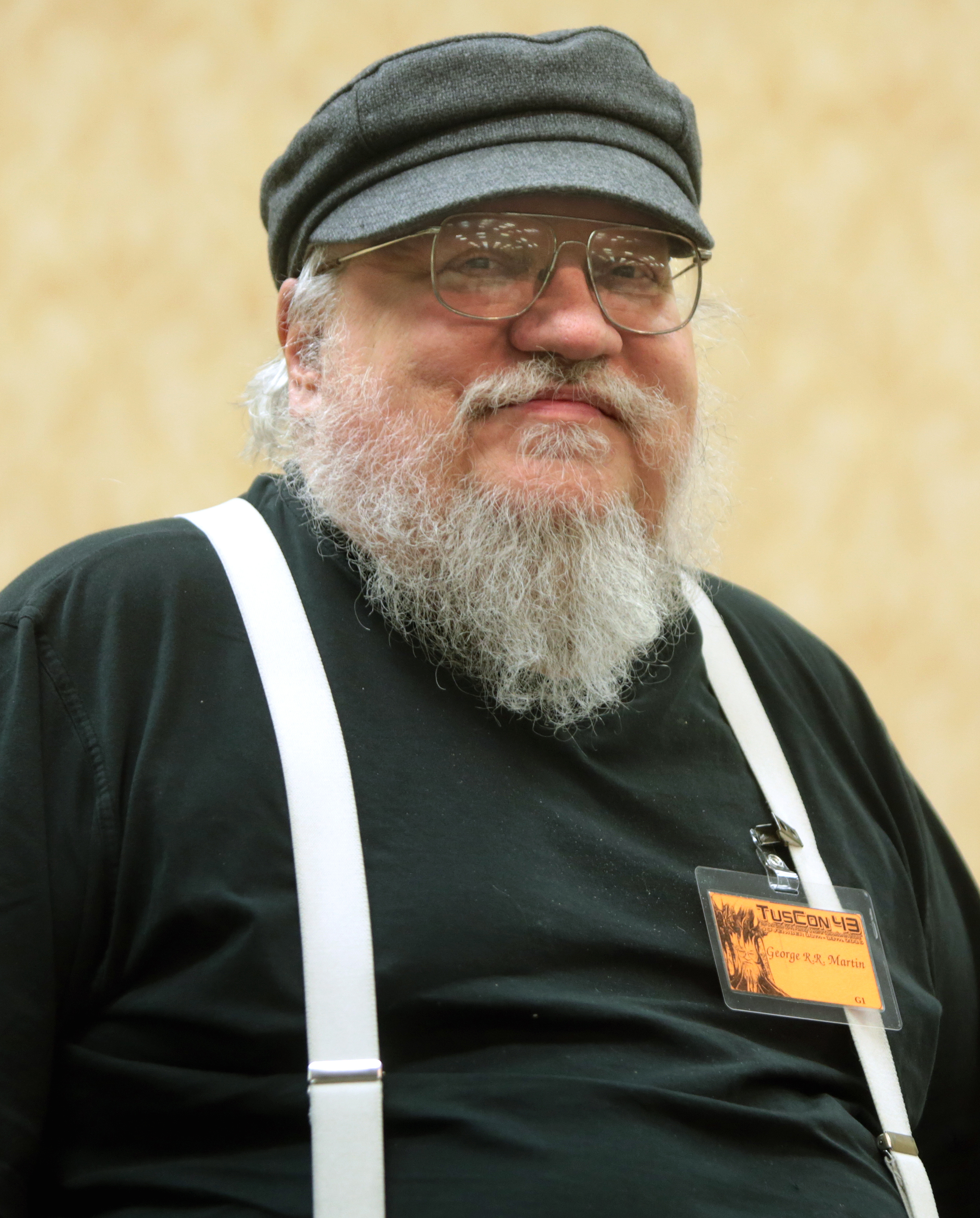
"The Lion and the Rose" was scripted by the author of the original saga, George R. R. Martin.

The episode was written by George R. R. Martin, author of the A Song of Ice and Fire novels. Chapters adapted from A Storm of Swords to the episode were part of chapter 9 (Bran I), and chapters 59 and 60 (Sansa IV and Tyrion VIII).

==== Original draft ====
In 2018, Vanity Fair writer Joanna Robinson compared the episode as aired with an early draft by Martin archived at the Writers Guild of America library in Los Angeles. Unlike the two previous episodes he had written, this draft had significant differences from the produced version. Robinson considers it the moment the show began to diverge considerably from the books, whose plotlines it had begun to outpace, and believes this may be why Martin wrote no more for the series.

The most significant difference involved who had masterminded the attempted assassination of Bran Stark in season 1, precipitating the War of the Five Kings that dominated the next two seasons. In Martin's script, after Joffrey is presented with the Valyrian steel sword, reforged from that of the executed Ned Stark's Ice, as a wedding gift by his father, he says "I am no stranger to Valyrian steel." This remark prompts Tyrion Lannister, who was framed for the assassination attempt, to realize that Joffrey was actually behind it (as the books heavily imply); Tyrion then makes remarks to Joffrey, and later Sansa, insinuating that he knows this.

Scenes that built on this disclosure remained in the final script. Had they made it to screen, they would have illuminated Joffrey's antagonism toward his uncle the morning of the wedding and more credibly implicated Tyrion as a suspect in the king's poisoning.

Tyrion in Martin's draft is straightforward with Shae when he implores her to leave the city, pointing out that Ros, the last prostitute his family discovered in relation to him, was captured and murdered. Both are violent, with Tyrion slapping Shae to underline his point and she drawing a dagger to fend him off.

In Martin's draft, Bran's first vision is more extensive. While it does not include the Night King's first appearance onscreen as it does in the series, it would have been an extensive montage of scenes from the past, present and possible future in the series. Flashbacks would have included scenes of Ned cleaning Ice beneath a weirwood tree from the show's original pilot, Bran's uncle Benjen and Lyanna Stark as children (later shown in a more extensive flashback in season 6), King Aerys watching and laughing as Ned's father and brother are burned and Jaime and Cersei embracing in the old keep at Winterfell just before Bran discovered them. Scenes reflecting the show's present included Jon with Ghost, a bloodied Robb surrounded by the Red Wedding dead, and Arya holding her sword Needle as her face blurs and changes. Possible future images include a dragon's shadow passing over King's Landing, "hints of strange small children with very dark eyes" and a group of four distinctive northern hills behind a very large weirwood.

The episode would also have set up some of the plotlines from the books that were not used in the later seasons of the series. Roose Bolton tells Ramsay that he has arranged for him to marry Arya as a way of consolidating the family's hold on the North; a role assigned to Sansa instead in the next season. Several lines were also intended to set up Jaime's trip to the Riverlands, which in the books immediately follows Joffrey's wedding but in the series was largely replaced by Jamie and Bronn's expedition to Dorne to bring Myrcella back to King's Landing. The two characters who take that trip instead in the books, along with many other minor characters from the wedding scenes, were in Martin's draft but eliminated from the produced version as showrunners David Benioff and D. B. Weiss were beginning to focus on the more established characters in the later seasons.

Robinson believes a note by Martin in the script suggests a different resolution to Ramsay's plot arc in the books, where he is still alive and in power at Winterfell at the end of A Dance with Dragons, in contrast to his death at the end of the sixth season of Game of Thrones. Martin's note told the showrunners that Ramsay's dogs would eventually battle the Stark children's direwolves, so the show should emphasize the former as much as possible to build audience anticipation. However, that never happened onscreen, where all but two of the wolves are dead as of the end of season 7, and seems unlikely in the books. Robinson believes this indicates that Ramsay will have a very different plot arc in the series' two final books.

Lesser differences include a more protracted, bloodier death scene for Joffrey as the poison drives him to slash his own face, a more lavish feast, and Theon's appearance as Reek following Ramsay's extensive torture more closely resembling that described in the books, complete with whitened hair and missing fingers, something that would have required more extensive special effects for the remainder of the series, as well as speaking in rhyme. Similarly, the burning of the heretics on the beach at Dragonstone would have demonstrated the power of the Lord of Light, with the bonfires suddenly changing to different colors and apparitions of the now-forgiven dead seen briefly above; the scene would have also foreshadowed Shireen's sacrifice by the same method the next season. The scene where Varys warns Tyrion that Cersei has told Tywin about Shae, a short conversation on a garden path in the finished episode, instead takes place at more length in the Red Keep's dungeons, with Varys dressed as "a denizen of the dungeons" in armor, carrying a whip and wearing a false beard.

Martin also wrote that some of the scenes should be shot from an individual character's point of view, much as most of his book chapters are written from the point of view of the character they take their name from. While he admitted that it had been difficult to bring that aspect of his story to the screen, he nevertheless attempted it here, calling for the scene where Ramsay and Myranda chase the woman to her death at the hands of his hounds to be seen from the woman's point of view as she runs and then falls to the ground, then from Theon's as he looks on defeated. The producers did, however, shoot scenes from the point of view of Bran's direwolf Summer, which Robinson notes saved them money since the animals have been expensive to shoot scenes with.

=== Casting ===
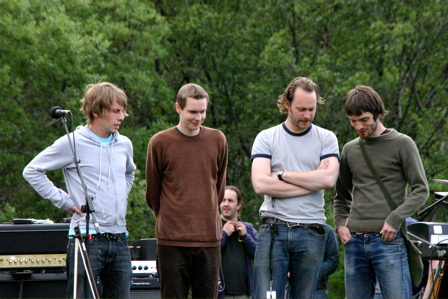
Members of Sigur Rós appeared in the episode.

The episode has the introduction of new recurring cast members Roger Ashton-Griffiths as Mace Tyrell, the Lord of Highgarden, and Elisabeth Webster as Walda Frey, Roose Bolton's new bride. Young actor Dean-Charles Chapman takes over the role of Tommen Baratheon as of this episode. In a cameo appearance, the Icelandic band Sigur Rós performed their rendition of "The Rains of Castamere" at King Joffrey's wedding, and again during the credits. Bryan Cogman, a regular screenwriter for the show, made an uncredited cameo in the episode as a Dragonstone waiter.

With this episode, Iwan Rheon (Ramsay Snow) is promoted to series regular.

== Reception ==
=== Ratings ===
"The Lion and the Rose" was watched by an estimated 6.31 million people during its first hour. In the United Kingdom, the episode was viewed by 1.651 million viewers, making it the highest-rated broadcast that week. It also received 0.095 million timeshift viewers.

=== Critical reception ===
The episode received universal critical acclaim. On Rotten Tomatoes, the episode has an approval rating of 100% based on 54 reviews, with an average score of 9.5 out of 10. The consensus reads: "The perfect pacing of "The Lion and the Rose" leads to one of the most excruciating—and gratifying—sequences in the series." James Poniewozik at Time called it the best episode of the series, singling out the protracted wedding sequence for particular praise. Writing for The A.V. Club, Emily VanDerWerff gave the episode an "A" grade, calling it "one of the best episodes of this show, and Joffrey’s wedding is one of the best sequences in the whole series." VanDerWerff praised Martin's script as well as the directing by Alex Graves, which she said "smartly creates a real sense of tension throughout the sequence, even when nothing particularly dramatic is going on." In his review for IGN, Matt Fowler gave the episode a 9.4/10 and noted that it "featured a shocking death that was actually an immense crowd-pleaser." TVLine named Jack Gleeson the "Performer of the Week" for his performance in this episode. James Hibberd of Entertainment Weekly named it the third best television episode of 2014.

==== Awards and nominations ====
Year	Award	Category	Nominee(s)	Result
2014	Primetime Emmy Awards	Outstanding Supporting Actress in a Drama Series	Lena Headey as Cersei Lannister	Nominated
2014	Primetime Creative Arts Emmy Awards	Outstanding Cinematography for a Single-Camera Series	Anette Haellmigk	Nominated
2014	Primetime Creative Arts Emmy Awards	Outstanding Costumes for a Series	Michele Clapton, Sheena Wichary, Alexander Fordham, and Nina Ayres	Won
2014	Primetime Creative Arts Emmy Awards	Outstanding Guest Actress in a Drama Series	Diana Rigg as Lady Olenna Tyrell	Nominated
2014	Primetime Creative Arts Emmy Awards	Outstanding Hairstyling for a Single-Camera Series	Kevin Alexander, Candice Banks, Rosalia Culora, Gary Machin, and Nicola Mount	Nominated
2014	1st MTV Fandom Awards	OMG Moment of the Year	Game of Thrones – The Purple Wedding	Won
2015	Writers Guild of America Awards	Episodic Drama	George R. R. Martin	Nominated
