= Al Lehman =

American costume designer

- Born: Alfred E. Lehman; June 15, 1924; New York, U.S.
- Died: December 17, 2001 (aged 77); North Hollywood, California, U.S.
- Occupation: Costume designer

Alfred E. Lehman (June 15, 1924 - December 17, 2001) was an American costume designer. He won a Primetime Emmy Award and was nominated for five more in the category Outstanding Costumes for his work on the television programs Laverne & Shirley, Buck Rogers in the 25th Century and Murder, She Wrote.

Lehman died in December 2001 of cancer at his home in North Hollywood, California, at the age of 77.
