= Lou Eyrich =

American costume designer

Lou A. Eyrich (/ˈaɪrɪk/ EYE-rik; born New Ulm, Minnesota) is an American costume designer best known for her work in the television series Glee and American Horror Story: Asylum.

In 2012, she was awarded a Career Achievement Award in Television from the Costume Designers Guild.

In 2010 and 2011, she was nominated for a Primetime Emmy in the Outstanding Costumes for a Series category for her work on Glee, work that was also given awards in 2010, 2011, and 2012 by the Costume Designers Guilde for in the Outstanding Contemporary Television Series. Her work on American Horror Story: Asylum received an award from the Costume Designers Guild in the Outstanding Made for TV Movie or Mini Series category in 2013, and her work on American Horror Story: Freak Show was nominated in the same category in 2015. More recently, Eyrich designed the costumes for the FX series Feud, which depicts the Hollywood rivalry between Joan Crawford and Bette Davis between 1963 and 1978.

Eyrich is a survivor of breast cancer.
