= Sheena Napier =

British costume designer

- Occupation: Costume designer
- Years active: 1981–present

Sheena Napier is a British costume designer. Her accolades include a BAFTA Television Award, in addition to nominations for an Academy Award and an Emmy Award.

== Awards and nominations ==
Award	Year (Note: Indicates the year of ceremony. Each year is linked to the article about the awards held that year, wherever possible.)	Category	Work	Result	Ref.
Academy Awards	1993	Best Costume Design	Enchanted April	Nominated	
British Academy Television Craft Awards	2013	Best Costume Design	Parade's End	Won	
Primetime Emmy Awards	2013	Outstanding Costumes for a Miniseries, Movie, or Special	Parade's End	Nominated	
