= Peggy Farrell (costume designer) =

American costume designer (1932–2021)

- Born: June 2, 1932; New York, U.S.
- Died: August 29, 2021 (aged 89)
- Occupation: Costume designer
- Years active: 1971–2006
- Children: 2

Peggy Farrell (June 2, 1932 – August 29, 2021) was an American costume designer. She was a winner of two Primetime Emmy Awards.

Born in New York, Farrell began her career in 1971, when she designed costumes for the film Taking Off. Her other credits include Dog Day Afternoon, Gloria, Next Stop, Greenwich Village, Desperate Characters, They All Laughed, The Stepford Wives, The Hot Rock and The Front. Farrell retired in 2006, and later sold her collection of costumes. In 2018, she won a Lela Thompson Award for Enduring Contribution.

Farrell died in August 2021, at the age of 89.
