= The Beautiful Girls (Mad Men) =

- Mad Men episode
- The final shot of the episode, illustrating the paths of three very different 1960s women: Joan Harris (Christina Hendricks), Peggy Olson (Elisabeth Moss), and Dr. Faye Miller (Cara Buono).
- Episode no.: Season 4 Episode 9
- Directed by: Michael Uppendahl
- Written by: Dahvi Waller; Matthew Weiner
- Original air date: September 19, 2010
- Running time: 48 minutes

Guest appearances
- Cara Buono as Faye Miller; Jessica Paré as Megan Calvet; Jay R. Ferguson as Stan Rizzo; Zosia Mamet as Joyce Ramsay; Charlie Hofheimer as Abe Drexler; Randee Heller as Miss Blankenship; David Warshofsky as Leonard Filmore

Episode chronology
← Previous "The Summer Man"	Next → "Hands and Knees"
- Mad Men season 4

"The Beautiful Girls" is the ninth episode of the fourth season of the American television drama series Mad Men and the 48th overall episode of the series. It first aired on the AMC channel in the United States on September 19, 2010. It was written by Dahvi Waller and Matthew Weiner and directed by Michael Uppendahl.

Don encounters multiple challenges at work, as his daughter shows up unannounced at the same time as his secretary dies. This situation puts a strain on his relationship with Dr. Faye Miller. Meanwhile, Joan, whose husband is about to be sent off to Vietnam, strikes up her old affair with Roger. Peggy meets up with Abe Drexler and becomes embroiled in a political debate that could threaten her standing at the agency.

This episode was nominated for the Primetime Emmy Award for Outstanding Costumes for a Series, while Randee Heller was nominated for Outstanding Guest Actress in a Drama Series for her performance.

== Plot ==
The episode opens with Don's negotiating a lunchtime meeting. In the next scene, he and Faye are having vigorous sex in his apartment. Each has a business meeting that afternoon; Don tells Faye his is with Secor Laxatives, but client confidentiality prevents Faye from satisfying Don's curiosity about whom she is meeting, as the client is another agency's.

With Joyce's help, Abe Drexler "bumps into" Peggy at the local bar, where the two engage in a conversation about race and feminism. After Abe reacts dismissively to Peggy's assertions that women have it as bad as African-Americans, she leaves angry. The next day, Abe arrives at Sterling Cooper Draper Pryce with an article he has written about corporate injustice towards African-Americans, titled "Nuremberg on Madison Avenue". When she reads the story, Peggy explodes in anger, as the article could get her fired.

After Roger learns that Joan's husband is being shipped off to Vietnam, Roger and Joan go to a diner to commiserate with each other. While walking through a dangerous part of town, on Broadway, Roger and Joan are mugged at gunpoint. The mugger takes Roger's wallet and watch, Joan's purse, and Roger and Joan's rings. Roger calms Joan in an alleyway, where in the heat of the moment, the two have sex.

Don has to deal with several crises at once. The elderly Miss Blankenship dies at her desk while he is meeting with Fillmore Auto Parts. The grief-stricken Sterling Cooper Draper Pryce employees quietly remove the corpse without the Fillmore clients' knowing. Additionally, Sally arrives at the agency after being found as a stowaway on the train. Betty refuses to pick up her child, which prompts Don to ask Faye to handle Sally. Faye does not have much parental chemistry with Sally, leading Faye to lash out at Don for pushing her into a high-pressure situation with his daughter. When Betty finally arrives to pick up Sally, Sally runs away, refusing to go with her. She falls on the floor and Don's new secretary, Megan, comforts her. Sally then reluctantly goes home with Betty.

Later, the ladies of the agency leave the office one-by-one. Joan, Peggy, and Faye walk into the same elevator car as the doors close on them.

== Deceased ==
- Ida Blankenship: Don Draper's aging secretary hired by Joan after Allison quit who was also formerly Bert Cooper's secretary and Roger's lover. She dies of a heart attack whilst she sleeps in this episode.

== Reception ==
=== Ratings ===
The episode was watched by 2.29 million viewers on the night of the original airing.

=== Critical reception ===
The episode received very positive reviews from most critics. James Poniewozik of Time magazine praised the episode's focus on women and the acting performance of Kiernan Shipka as Sally Draper. IGN writer Eric Goldman praised the episode for its comic flourishes set against the backdrop of Mrs. Blankenship's death. He, in particular, called the scene where the SCDP employees try to get the Blankenship's corpse out of the office in a covert fashion "pretty classic". Keith Phipps of The A.V. Club praised the final image, saying, "The final shot of Peggy, Joan, and Faye (who is starting to develop into a more interesting character, let me add), says it all without any dialogue. Here are three women of roughly the same generation, all in quite different places in their lives and careers, each of those places more or less unimaginable to the generation before." Writer Myles McNutt said, "the female characters are the heart of this series, and 'The Beautiful Girls' comes together as a sustained statement on their centrality if not a substantial step forward in their individual storylines."
