= Grady Hunt =

American costume designer (1921–2013)

- Born: May 16, 1921; Lone Oak, Texas, U.S.
- Died: May 5, 2013 (aged 91); Hollywood, California, U.S.
- Occupation: Costume designer

Grady Hunt (May 16, 1921 – May 5, 2013) was an American costume designer. He was nominated for seven Primetime Emmy Awards in the category Outstanding Costumes for his work on the television programs Columbo, The Snoop Sisters, The Quest, Quark, Beulah Land, Fantasy Island and the television film Ziegfeld: The Man and His Women. In 2007, he received the Costume Designers Guild Career Achievement Award. Hunt died in May 2013 in Hollywood, California, at the age of 91.
