= Bill Hargate =

American costume designer

Bill Hargate (1935–2003) was an American costume designer, known for his work on stage and screen. He won four Emmy Awards, including one for his work on the series Murphy Brown. Hargate was born in St. Louis, Missouri in 1935. He attended the Goodman School of Drama in Chicago, Illinois from 1953 to 1958. Hargate died from leukemia in Los Angeles on September 12, 2003.

== Career ==
Hargate began his career in St. Louis, where he did costume design, particularly for productions by the St. Louis Municipal Opera in the early 1960s. Then, Hargate worked with Theoni V. Aldredge and Donald Brooks on Broadway. In the late 1960s, Hargate went to Hollywood to work on Star! (1968) with Brooks. In the 1970s, Hargate transitioned to working on television, starting at NBC's Burbank Studios where he worked on hundreds of costumes each week for NBC's programs. Next, he moved on to costuming for Universal Studios. In 1979, Hargate designed costumes for the Broadway revivals of Peter Pan and Oklahoma!.

Starting in the 1980s, Hargate worked as a freelance designer for television shows and specials. For his costume design, he was nominated for twelve and won four Emmys. In 1985, Hargate opened Bill Hargate Costumes, a business which makes and rents costumes for film, television, stage productions, and awards shows.

=== Best-known work ===
With his work for Murphy Brown, Hargate created an iconic look. He dressed actress Candice Bergen in trendsetting, modern career looks, using colorful blazers, short skirts, and high heels. This look, especially the red silk blazer in the first episode, was emulated by New York fashion collections for years. He modeled the costumes of Bergen's co-star, Faith Ford, off the dress code of Miss America pageant winners. In 1997, Hargate began costuming the Miss America pageant itself.

Later in his career, Hargate also dressed celebrities for special events. He dressed Annie Potts, Kim Basinger, Barbara Mandrell, Ethel Merman and Mary Tyler Moore for various awards shows. For the 1992 Academy Awards, his dress for Geena Davis was widely commented upon (and criticized).

Hargate received the Aldo Award from the Menswear Association of America in 1995 and the Costume Designers Guild's Lifetime Achievement Award in 2001.

== Television work ==
Bill Hargate costumed the following productions:

- The 29th People's Choice Awards
- Miss America (1997 - 2002)
- Amy Grant... A Christmas to Remember
- Over the Top (1997 - 1998)
- Murphy Brown (1988 - 1997)
  - Won 1991 Emmy Award for Outstanding Costuming in a Series
- Love & War (1992 - 1996)
- Barbara Mandrell: Steppin' Out
  - 1996 Nominee for Outstanding Costume Design for a Variety or Music Program
- The Home Court (1995 - 1996)
- The Louie Show
- Double Rush
- David Foster's Christmas Album
  - 1994 Emmy Award Nominee for Outstanding Individual Achievement in Costume Design for a Variety or Music Program
- Motown 30: What's Goin' On!
- Sunday Night With Larry King
- Ann Jillian (1989 - 1990)
- Opryland Celebrates 200 Years of America's Music
  - 1988 Nominee for Outstanding Costume Design for a Variety or Music Program
- Barbara Mandrell's Christmas: A Family Reunion
- Me and Mrs. C. (1985 - 1987)
- My Sister Sam
  - 1987 Nominee for Outstanding Achievement in Costuming for a Series
- Handsome Harry's
- Miss Hollywood, 1986
- Sylvia Fine Kaye's Musical Comedy Tonight III
  - Won 1986 Emmy Award for Outstanding Costume Design for a Variety or Music Program
- Barbara Mandrell: Something Special
- Barbara Mandrell and the Mandrell Sisters
  - 1982 Nominee for Outstanding Costume Design for a Regular or Limited Series
- I Love Liberty
- Once Upon a Brothers Grimm
  - Won 1978 Emmy Award for Outstanding Individual Achievement in Children's Programming
- Doug Henning's World of Magic
  - 1978 Emmy Award Nominee for Outstanding Individual Achievement in Costume Design for a Variety or Music Program
- Neil Sedaka: Steppin' Out
  - 1977 Nominee for Outstanding Achievement in Individual Costume Design for a Variety or Music Program
- Pinocchio (CBS, 1976) starring Sandy Duncan
  - Won 1977 Emmy Award for Outstanding Individual Achievement in Children's Programming
- Annie and the Hoods
- McCloud: Who Killed Miss U.S.A.?
- The D.A.: Murder One
- Ink
- Love and Curses... And All That Jazz
- The Movie Murderer
- The Psychiatrist: God Bless the Children
