= Robert Turturice =

- Born: March 15, 1949; Berkeley, California
- Died: December 15, 2009 (aged 60)
- Occupation: Costume designer

Robert Turturice (March 15, 1949 – December 15, 2009) was an American costume designer who served as president of the Costume Designers Guild from 1992 to 1996. Turturice was presented posthumously with the Costume Designers Hall of Fame Award on Feb. 22, 2010. During Turturice's four-decade career, he worked on feature films as well as television series and television specials. Tiurturice was also given the Best Dressed Series Award by the California Fashion Industry and the California Mart for his work on the TV series Moonlighting, for which he subsequently won his Emmy in 1987.

== Early career ==
Turturice was a native of Berkeley, California. After high school he came to Pasadena, California where he studied set design and worked with the Pasadena Playhouse. It was here he found his real love which was fashion design.

== Films and television credits ==
Turturice established a reputation as the rare costume designer whose range encompassed amazing period costumes as well as couture gowns worn by actresses on the red carpet at Hollywood's award ceremonies. Known as one of the last of the old school costume designers who made every piece, he influenced and mentored many in the field. One example of this hand crafted detail was the handmade charm bracelet he created from clay as a Stone Age accessory for "The Flintstones in Viva Rock Vegas". This was modeled in minute detail from contemporary charms. He also became known for dressing farm and circus animals in a number of feature films, and during a seminar at the University of California Los Angeles, he described what it was like to dress elephants and other circus animals for their film roles, a project he enjoyed despite the unique challenges.

His feature films included The Flintstones in Viva Rock Vegas, Clean and Sober, Beaches and Big Top Pee-wee. He also did the Pee-wee Herman TV special costuming for Pee-wee's Playhouse and "Pee-wee's Playhouse Christmas Special". His television work included 31 movies of the week, 19 series, 15 specials and 27 pilots. In addition to his Emmy Award for the Moonlighting episode "Atomic Shakespeare" in 1987, he received additional nominations for his work on the HBO movie Gia and for Cybill.
