= Ret Turner =

American costume designer (1929–2016)

- Born: Walter Raymond Turner; April 14, 1929
- Died: May 4, 2016 (aged 87)
- Occupation: American costume designer

Walter Raymond "Ret" Turner (April 14, 1929 – May 4, 2016) was an American costume designer, best known for his dressing of entertainment icons such as Cher, Diana Ross, Dolly Parton, Anita Pointer, Barry Manilow, Neil Diamond, Shirley Booth, Lily Tomlin, Marie Osmond, Billy Crystal, Lucille Ball and Jean Stapleton. He had 23 Emmy nominations and five wins.

Turner began his career on the Dinah Shore Chevrolet Show, and except for his reoccurring role as one of the Flying Silvermans on The Andy Williams Show, has been designing ever since. Alongside Bob Mackie and Ray Aghayan, Turner opened a design and costume rental company, Ret Turner Costume Rentals, that featured their designs and costumes. In 2002, he received the Costume Designers Guild Career Achievement Award.
