= Three Card Trick (Wolf Hall) =

- Wolf Hall episode
- Episode no.: Series 1 Episode 1
- Written by: Peter Straughan
- Story by: Hilary Mantel
- Original air date: 21 January 2015
- Running time: 60 minutes

Episode chronology
← Previous —	Next → "Entirely Beloved"

"Three Card Trick" is the first episode of the BBC Two series Wolf Hall. It was first broadcast on 21 January 2015.

== Plot ==
In 1529, King Henry VIII dismisses Lord Chancellor Cardinal Thomas Wolsey for his failure to convince Pope Clement VII to annul Henry's marriage to his wife, Catherine of Aragon, in order to marry Anne Boleyn. Wolsey's lawyer, Thomas Cromwell, reminisces over his time with the Cardinal, his dealings with the Boleyn family and his own personal life, including the death of his wife and two daughters from the sweating sickness in 1528.

== Cast ==
- Mark Rylance as Thomas Cromwell
- Jonathan Pryce as Thomas Wolsey
- Damian Lewis as Henry VIII, King of England
- Claire Foy as Anne Boleyn
- Mark Gatiss as Stephen Gardiner
- Bernard Hill as Thomas Howard, Duke of Norfolk
- Robert Wilfort as George Cavendish
- Anton Lesser as Thomas More
- Joanne Whalley as Catherine of Aragon
- Natasha Little as Liz Cromwell
- Christopher Fairbank as Walter Cromwell
- Tom Holland as Gregory Cromwell
- Harry Lloyd as Harry Percy
- Charity Wakefield as Mary Boleyn

== Critical reception ==
The premiere of Wolf Hall received positive reviews. The Daily Telegraph gave the episode 5/5, saying "it fully communicates the nerve-jangling sense of bodily threat with which Mantel’s novels are freighted — life is cheap in a disease-ridden Tudor England ruled by an absolute monarch."
