= Entirely Beloved =

- Wolf Hall episode
- Episode no.: Series 1 Episode 2
- Directed by: Peter Kosminsky
- Written by: Peter Straughan
- Story by: Hilary Mantel
- Original air date: 28 January 2015
- Running time: 60 minutes

Episode chronology
← Previous "Three Card Trick"	Next → "Anna Regina"

"Entirely Beloved" is the second episode of the BBC Two series Wolf Hall. It was first broadcast on 28 January 2015.

== Plot summary ==
In December 1529, following Cardinal Thomas Wolsey's departure as Lord Chancellor, Thomas Cromwell gains favour from King Henry VIII and is sworn into the king's Privy Council.

== Cast ==
- Mark Rylance as Thomas Cromwell
- Jonathan Pryce as Thomas Wolsey
- Damian Lewis as Henry VIII of England
- Claire Foy as Anne Boleyn
- Bernard Hill as the Duke of Norfolk
- Robert Wilfort as George Cavendish
- Anton Lesser as Thomas More
- Joanne Whalley as Catherine of Aragon
- Christopher Fairbank as Walter Cromwell
- Tom Holland as Gregory Cromwell
- Thomas Brodie Sangster as Rafe Sadler
- Harry Lloyd as Harry Percy
- Charity Wakefield as Mary Boleyn

== Critical reception ==
"Entirely Beloved" received positive reviews. The Daily Telegraph again gave the episode 5/5; Reviewer Jasper Reeves also praised Straughan's dialogue and Peter Kosminsky's directing, writing, "It's like watching a chess grandmaster go around a room playing 20 challengers at once. The spectacle is dizzying, and the acting magnificent."

Neela Debnath, writing for The Independent, compared the intrigue and scheming in Wolf Hall to that of Game of Thrones, writing, "Game of Thrones fans tuning in to watch Wolf Hall might notice similarities between the politicking in King's Landing and Henry VIII's court – and they wouldn't be wrong." Debnath praised the lead actor, writing, "Rylance continues to mesmerize as the man of questionable birth rising to become the king's right-hand man. His calm, collected and measured performance really has the audience rooting for him."

In his review for The Guardian, John Sutherland praised writer Peter Straughan, who wrote the teleplay based on Hilary Mantel's original book: "Straughan ... has been commendably faithful to Mantel while infusing new televisual life into the narrative.
