= Primetime Emmy Award for Outstanding Period Costumes =

Television award category

- Awarded for: Outstanding Period Costumes
- Country: United States
- Presented by: Academy of Television Arts & Sciences
- First award: 2015
- Currently held by: Palm Royale (2026)
- Website: emmys.com

The Primetime Emmy Award for Outstanding Period Costumes is presented as part of the Primetime Emmy Awards. In 2015, categories for period/fantasy and contemporary costumes were created. The categories were divided in 2018 for period and fantasy/sci-fi costumes. They replaced the retired categories for Outstanding Costumes for a Miniseries, Movie, or Special and Outstanding Costumes for a Series.

Rules require that nominations are distributed proportionally among regular series and limited series/movies, based on the number of submissions of each. For instance, if two-fifths of submissions are limited series/movies then two of the five nominees will be limited series/movies.

== Winners and nominations ==
=== 2010s ===
| Year | Program | Episode | Nominees | Network |
|---|---|---|---|---|
| 2010 | Outstanding Costumes for a Miniseries, Movie or Special | | | |
| 2010 | Return to Cranford | "Part 2" | Jenny Beavan and Alison Beard | PBS |
| 2010 | Emma | "Part 2" | Rosalind Ebbutt and Amanda Keable | PBS |
| 2010 | Georgia O'Keeffe | | Michael Dennison and Frances Vega | Lifetime |
| 2010 | The Pacific | "Part 3" | Penny Rose and Ken Crouch | HBO |
| 2010 | You Don't Know Jack | | Rita Ryack and Maria Tortu | HBO |
| 2010 | Outstanding Costumes for a Series | | | |
| 2010 | The Tudors | "As It Should Be" | Joan Bergin and Susan O'Connor Cave | Showtime |
| 2010 | Glee | "The Power of Madonna" | Lou Eyrich and Marisa Aboitiz | Fox |
| 2010 | The Good Wife | "Crash" | Daniel Lawson, Jennifer Rogien Faletti and Daniele Hollywood | CBS |
| 2010 | Mad Men | "Souvenir" | Janie Bryant and Le Dawson | AMC |
| 2010 | 30 Rock | "I Do Do" | Tom Broecker and Remy Pearce, Joanna Brett | NBC |
| 2011 | Outstanding Costumes for a Miniseries, Movie or Special | | | |
| 2011 | Downton Abbey | "Part 1" | Susannah Buxton and Caroline McCal | PBS |
| 2011 | Cinema Verite | | Suttirat Anne Larlarb and Joseph T. Mastrolia | HBO |
| 2011 | Mildred Pierce | "Part 2" | Ann Roth, Michelle Matland and Patrick Wiley | HBO |
| 2011 | Upstairs, Downstairs | "The Fledgling" | Amy Roberts and Giles Gale | PBS |
| 2011 | Outstanding Costumes for a Series | | | |
| 2011 | The Borgias | "Lucrezia's Wedding" | Gabriella Pescucci and Uliva Pizzetti | Showtime |
| 2011 | Boardwalk Empire | "Anastasia" | John Dunn, Courtney McClain and Chris Peterson | HBO |
| 2011 | Game of Thrones | "The Pointy End" | Michele Clapton and Rachael Webb-Crozier | HBO |
| 2011 | Glee | "New York City" | Lou Eyrich and Marisa Aboitiz | Fox |
| 2011 | Mad Men | "The Beautiful Girls" | Janie Bryant and Le Dawson | AMC |
| 2012 | Outstanding Costumes for a Miniseries, Movie or Special | | | |
| 2012 | Great Expectations | | Annie Symons and Yvonne Duckett | PBS |
| 2012 | American Horror Story | "Halloween" | Chrisi Karvonides and Conan Castro | FX |
| 2012 | Hatfields & McCoys | "Part 2" | Karri Hutchinson and Adina Bucur | History |
| 2012 | Hemingway & Gellhorn | | Ruth Myers and William McPhail | HBO |
| 2012 | Sherlock: A Scandal in Belgravia | | Sarah Arthur and Ceri Walford | PBS |
| 2012 | Treasure Island | "Part 1" | Lorna Marie Mugan and Rhona McGuirke | Syfy |
| 2012 | Outstanding Costumes for a Series | | | |
| 2012 | Game of Thrones | "The Prince of Winterfell" | Michele Clapton, Alexander Fordham and Chloe Aubry | HBO |
| 2012 | Boardwalk Empire | "21" | John Dunn and Maria Zamansky | HBO |
| 2012 | The Borgias | "The Confession" | Gabriella Pescucci and Uliva Pizzetti | Showtime |
| 2012 | Downton Abbey | "Episode One" | Susannah Buxton | PBS |
| 2012 | Once Upon a Time | "Hat Trick" | Eduardo Castro and Monique McRae | ABC |
| 2013 | Outstanding Costumes for a Miniseries, Movie or Special | | | |
| 2013 | Behind the Candelabra | | Ellen Mirojnick and Robert Q. Matthews | HBO |
| 2013 | American Horror Story: Asylum | "Madness Ends" | Lou Eyrich and Marcy Lavender | FX |
| 2013 | The Girl | | Diana Cilliers and Melissa Moritz | HBO |
| 2013 | Killing Lincoln | | Amy Andrews Harrell and Renee Jones | Nat Geo |
| 2013 | Parade's End | "Episode 3" | Sheena Napier and Jenna McGranaghan | HBO |
| 2013 | Phil Spector | | Debra McGuire and Lorraine Calvert | HBO |
| 2013 | Outstanding Costumes for a Series | | | |
| 2013 | The Borgias | "The Gunpowder Plot" | Gabriella Pescucci, Uliva Pizzetti and Gábor Homonnay | Showtime |
| 2013 | Boardwalk Empire | "Resolution" | John Dunn and Maria Zamansky | HBO |
| 2013 | Downton Abbey | "Episode Four" | Caroline McCall and Dulcie Scott | PBS |
| 2013 | Game of Thrones | "Walk of Punishment" | Michele Clapton, Alexander Fordham and Chloe Aubry | HBO |
| 2013 | Once Upon a Time | "Queen of Hearts" | Eduardo Castro and Monique McRae | ABC |
| 2014 | Outstanding Costumes for a Miniseries, Movie or Special | | | |
| 2014 | American Horror Story: Coven | | Lou Eyrich, Elizabeth Macey and Ken Van Duyne | FX |
| 2014 | House of Versace | | Claire Nadon and Nicole Magny | Lifetime |
| 2014 | The Normal Heart | | Daniel Orlandi, Gail A. Fitzgibbons, Hartsell Taylor and Maria Tortu | HBO |
| 2014 | Sherlock: His Last Vow | | Sarah Arthur and Ceri Walford | PBS |
| 2014 | The White Queen | "Long Live the King" | Nic Ede, Raissa Hans and Elizabeth Healy | Starz |
| 2014 | Outstanding Costumes for a Series | | | |
| 2014 | Game of Thrones | "The Lion and the Rose" | Michele Clapton, Sheena Wichary, Alexander Fordham and Nina Ayres | HBO |
| 2014 | Boardwalk Empire | "New York Sour" | John Dunn, Lisa Padovani and Joseph La Corte | HBO |
| 2014 | Downton Abbey | "Episode Eight" | Caroline McCall, Heather Leat and Poli Kyriacou | PBS |
| 2014 | Mad Men | "Time Zones" | Janie Bryant, Tiffany White Stanton and Stacy Horn | AMC |
| 2014 | Once Upon a Time | "A Curious Thing" | Eduardo Castro and Monique McRae | ABC |
| 2015 | Outstanding Costumes for a Period/Fantasy Series, Limited Series or Movie | | | |
| 2015 | American Horror Story: Freak Show | "Monsters Among Us" | Lou Eyrich, Elizabeth Macey and Ken Van Duyne | FX |
| 2015 | Boardwalk Empire | "Golden Days for Boys and Girls" | John Dunn, Maria Zamansky, James Hammer and Joseph La Corte | HBO |
| 2015 | Downton Abbey | "A Moorland Holiday" | Anna Robbins, Michael Weldon and Kathryn Tart | PBS |
| 2015 | Game of Thrones | "The Dance of Dragons" | Michele Clapton, Alex Fordham, Nina Ayres and Sheena Wichary | HBO |
| 2015 | Wolf Hall | "Anna Regina" | Joanna Eatwell, T.K. Lang and Clare Vyse | PBS |
| 2016 | Game of Thrones | "The Winds of Winter" | Michele Clapton, Chloe Aubry and Sheena Wichary | HBO |
| 2016 | Downton Abbey | "Episode Eight" | Anna Mary Scott Robbins, Kathryn Tart and Michael Weldon | PBS |
| 2016 | Outlander | "Not in Scotland Anymore" | Terry Dresbach, Elle Wilson, Nadine Powell and Anna Lau | Starz |
| 2016 | The People v. O. J. Simpson: American Crime Story | "Marcia, Marcia, Marcia" | Hala Bahmet, Marina Ray and Elinor Bardach | FX |
| 2016 | Roots | "Night One" | Ruth E. Carter, Diana Cilliers, Megan "Bijou" Coates, Hetta Burger, Meagan McLaughlin Luster and Gillian Gregg | History |
2017
| 2017 | The Crown | "Wolferton Splash" | Michele Clapton, Alex Fordham, Emma O'Loughlin and Kate O'Farrell | Netflix |
| 2017 | Feud: Bette and Joan | "And the Winner Is... (The Oscars of 1963)" | Lou Eyrich, Hannah Jacobs and Katie Saunders | FX |
| 2017 | Genius | "Einstein: Chapter Seven" | Sonu Mishra, Martina Hejlova and Petia Krckova | Nat Geo |
| 2017 | The Handmaid's Tale | "Offred" | Ane Crabtree and Sheena Wichary | Hulu |
| 2017 | Westworld | "The Original" | Trish Summerville, Jo Kissack Folsom and Lynda Foote | HBO |
| 2018 | Outstanding Period Costumes | | | |
| 2018 | The Crown | "Dear Mrs. Kennedy" | Jane Petrie, Emily Newby, Basia Kuznar and Gaby Spanswick | Netflix |
| 2018 | The Alienist | "A Fruitful Partnership" | Michael Kaplan, Rudy Mance, Beáta Merkovits and Andrew Hunt | TNT |
| 2018 | Genius: Picasso | "Chapter One" | Sonu Mishra, Eudald Magari and Balazs Labancz | Nat Geo |
| 2018 | The Marvelous Mrs. Maisel | "The Disappointment of the Dionne Quintuplets" | Donna Zakowska, Marina Reti, Ginnie Patton and Sheila Grover | Prime Video |
| 2018 | Outlander | "Freedom & Whisky" | Terry Dresbach, Nadine Powell and Anna Lau | Starz |
2019
| 2019 | The Marvelous Mrs. Maisel | "We're Going to the Catskills!" | Donna Zakowska, Marina Reti and Tim McKelvey | Prime Video |
| 2019 | Chernobyl | "Please Remain Calm" | Odile Dicks-Mireaux, Daiva Petrulyte, Holly McLean, Anna Munro and Sylvie Org | HBO |
| 2019 | Fosse/Verdon | "Life Is a Cabaret" | Melissa Toth, Joseph La Corte, Catherine Crabtree, Isabelle Simone, Kristin Isola and Virginia Patton | FX |
| 2019 | GLOW | "Every Potato Has a Receipt" | Beth Morgan, Alexandra Casey and Sharon Taylor Sampson | Netflix |
| 2019 | Pose | "Pilot" | Lou Eyrich, Analucia Mcgorty, Amy Ritchings and Kevin Ritter | FX |

=== 2020s ===
| Year | Program | Episode | Nominees | Network |
|---|---|---|---|---|
2020
| 2020 | The Crown | "Cri de Coeur" | Amy Roberts, Sidonie Roberts and Sarah Moore | Netflix |
| 2020 | Hollywood | "A Hollywood Ending" | Lou Eyrich, Sarah Evelyn, Tiger Curran and Suzy Freeman | Netflix |
| 2020 | The Marvelous Mrs. Maisel | "It's Comedy or Cabbage" | Donna Zakowska, Marina Reti, Sheila Grover and Ginnie Patton | Prime Video |
| 2020 | Mrs. America | "Shirley" | Bina Daigeler, Erin Byrne, Bettina Seifert, Erika Larner, Mila Hermanovski and Eileen Kennedy | FX |
| 2020 | Pose | "Acting Up" | Analucia McGorty, Nicky Smith, Alexa DeFazio and Linda Giammarese | FX |
2021
| 2021 | The Queen's Gambit | "End Game" | Gabriele Binder, Gina Krauss, Katrin Hoffmann, Nanrose Buchmann and Sparka Lee Hall | Netflix |
| 2021 | Bridgerton | "Diamond of the First Water" | Ellen Mirojnick, John Glaser, Sanaz Missaghian and Kenny Crouch | Netflix |
| 2021 | The Crown | "Terra Nullius" | Amy Roberts, Sidonie Roberts and Giles Gale | Netflix |
| 2021 | Halston | "Versailles" | Jeriana San Juan, Catherine Crabtree, Cailey Breneman and Anne Newton-Harding | Netflix |
| 2021 | Ratched | "Pilot" | Lou Eyrich, Rebecca Guzzi, Allison Agler and Betsy Glick | Netflix |
2022
| 2022 | The Great | "Five Days" | Sharon Long, Viveene Campbell, Anna Cavalerie and Bobbie Edwards | Hulu |
| 2022 | Angelyne | "Glow in the Dark Queen of the Universe" | Danny Glicker, Jessica Fasman and Adam Girardet | Peacock |
| 2022 | Bridgerton | "Harmony" | Sophie Canale, Dougie Hawkes, Sarah June Mills, Charlotte Armstrong, Sanaz Missaghian and Kevin Pratten-Stone | Netflix |
| 2022 | The First Lady | "Cracked Pot" | Signe Sejlund, Felicia Jarvis, Matthew Hemesath, Paula Truman, Stephen Oh and Jessica Trejos | Showtime |
| 2022 | The Marvelous Mrs. Maisel | "Maisel vs. Lennon: The Cut Contest" | Donna Zakowska, Moria Sine Clinton, Ben Philipp, Ginnie Patton, Dan Hicks and Mikita Thompson | Prime Video |
| 2023 | Outstanding Period Costumes for a Series | | | |
| 2023 | The Great | "Choose Your Weapon" | Sharon Long, Claire Tremlett, Basia Kuznar and Anna Lau | Hulu |
| 2023 | The Crown | "Mou Mou" | Amy Roberts, Sidonie Roberts and Christof Roche-Gordon | Netflix |
| 2023 | The Marvelous Mrs. Maisel | "Susan" | Donna Zakowska, Katie Hartsoe, Ben Philipp, Amanda Seymour, Claire Aquila and Marie Seifts | Prime Video |
| 2023 | Perry Mason | "Chapter Ten" | Catherine Adair, David J. Matwijkow and Nanrose Buchman | HBO |
| 2023 | Queen Charlotte: A Bridgerton Story | "Crown Jewels" | Lyn Elizabeth Paolo, Laura Frecon, Jovana Gospavic and Alex Locke | Netflix |
| 2023 | Outstanding Period Costumes for a Limited or Anthology Series or Movie | | | |
| 2023 | Daisy Jones & the Six | "Track 8: Looks Like We Made It" | Denise Wingate and Derek Sullivan | Prime Video |
| 2023 | Dahmer – Monster: The Jeffrey Dahmer Story | "Please Don't Go" | Rudy Mance, Monica Chamberlain, Desmond Smith and Suzy Freeman | Netflix |
| 2023 | George & Tammy | "We're Gonna Hold On" | Mitchell Travers, Mitchel Wolf, Laurel Rose, Aileen Abercrombie, Susan Russell and Charles Carter | Showtime |
| 2023 | Guillermo del Toro's Cabinet of Curiosities | "Dreams in the Witch House" | Luis Sequeira, Ann Steel and Heather Crepp | Netflix |
| 2023 | Welcome to Chippendales | "Leeches" | Peggy Schnitzer, Derek Bulger and Julie Heath | Hulu |
| 2024 | Outstanding Period Costumes for a Series | | | |
| 2024 | Shōgun | "Ladies of the Willow World" | Carlos Rosario, Carole Griffin, Kristen Bond, Kenichi Tanaka and Paula Plachy | FX |
| 2024 | The Gilded Age | "You Don't Even Like Opera" | Kasia Walicka Maimone, Patrick Wiley, Isabelle Simone, Denise Andres and Rebecca Levin Lore | HBO |
| 2024 | The New Look | "What a Day This Has Been" | Karen Muller Serreau, Catherine Boisgontier and Emmanuelle Pertus | Apple TV+ |
| 2024 | Palm Royale | "Maxine Throws a Party" | Alix Friedberg, Carolyn Dessert, Leigh Bell, Lindsay Newton and Valerie Keiser | Apple TV+ |
| 2024 | Winning Time: The Rise of the Lakers Dynasty | "What Is and What Should Never Be" | Emma Potter, Maressa Richtmyer and Shannon Moore | HBO |
| 2024 | Outstanding Period Costumes for a Limited or Anthology Series or Movie | | | |
| 2024 | Feud: Capote vs. The Swans | "Pilot" | Lou Eyrich, Leah Katznelson, Emily O'Connor, Laura McCarthy, Hanna Shea and Miwa Ishii | FX |
| 2024 | Griselda | "Paradise Lost" | Safowa Bright Bitzelberger, Joseph Castellanos, Jennifer Marlin, Serena Duffin and Joanne Mills Trotta | Netflix |
| 2024 | Lessons in Chemistry | "Little Miss Hastings" | Mirren Gordon-Crozier, Jen Kennedy and Kelli Hagen | Apple TV+ |
| 2024 | Mary & George | "Not So Much as Love as by Awe" | Annie Symons, Cédric Andries, Courtney McClain, Jovana Gospavic and Jason Airey | Starz |
| 2024 | Ripley | "IV La Dolce Vita" | Maurizio Millenotti, Gianni Casalnuovo, Ernest Camilleri, Teresa D'Arienzo and Francesco Morabito | Netflix |
2025
| 2025 | Bridgerton | "Into the Light" | John Glaser, Amanda McLaughlan, Dougie Hawkes, George Sayer and Anthony Brookman | Netflix |
| 2025 | American Primeval | "Episode 2" | Virginia B. Johnson, Donna Casey Aira, Tonya Barrett, Mila Hermanovski, Sueann Leung and April McCoy | Netflix |
| 2025 | Monsters: The Lyle and Erik Menendez Story | "Blame It on the Rain" | Paula Bradley, Michelle Sandvig and Shannon Campbell | Netflix |
| 2025 | 1923 | "A Dream and a Memory" | Janie Bryant, Gaby Acosta, Jaclyn Tamizato, Kelly Chambers and Megan Guthrie-Wedemeyer | Paramount+ |
| 2025 | Wolf Hall: The Mirror and the Light (Masterpiece) | "Wreckage" | Joanna Eatwell, Havva Buckles and Clare Vyse | PBS |
2026
| 2026 | Palm Royale | "Maxine Is Ready to Single Mingle" | Alix Friedberg, Leigh Bell, Samantha Schwartz, Carolyn Dessert, Jennifer Wolf and Valerie Keiser | Apple TV |
| 2026 | Bridgerton | "Dance in the Country" | John Walter Glaser III, Dougie Hawkes, George Sayer, Anthony Brookman, Amanda McLaughlan and Pascha Hanaway | Netflix |
| 2026 | The Gilded Age | "Marriage Is a Gamble" | Kasia Walicka Maimone, Denise Andres, Rebecca Levin, Isabelle Simone, Rebecca Freund and Sue Bakula | HBO |
| 2026 | Love Story: John F. Kennedy Jr. & Carolyn Bessette | "The Wedding" | Rudy Mance, Natalie Turturro Mettouchi, Brittany Griffin, Moria Sine Clinton and Liz Samuels | FX |
| 2026 | Monster: The Ed Gein Story | "Mother!" | Joshua J. Marsh, Serrita Coleman, Michelle Matteo, Latrese Wright, Erin Fabian and Sara Daubney-Kinney | Netflix |

== Programs with multiple wins ==
4 wins

- The Crown (Note: Total includes The Crown’s win for Outstanding Contemporary Costumes.)

2 wins

- The Great

== Programs with multiple nominations ==
Totals include nominees for Outstanding Costumes for a Series.

6 nominations

- The Crown (Note: Total includes The Crown’s nomination for Outstanding Contemporary Costumes.)
- Downton Abbey

5 nominations

- Boardwalk Empire
- Mad Men
- The Marvelous Mrs. Maisel

4 nominations

- Bridgerton
- Remember WENN
- That '70s Show
- The Tudors

3 nominations

- The Borgias
- Deadwood
- Dr. Quinn, Medicine Woman
- Monster
- Pose (Note: Total includes Pose’s nomination for Outstanding Contemporary Costumes.)
- Road to Avonlea

2 nominations

- Carnivàle
- Genius
- The Gilded Age
- The Great
- Homefront
- I'll Fly Away
- The Magnificent Seven
- Outlander
- Palm Royale
- Rome
- Wolf Hall
- The Young Indiana Jones Chronicles
