= Anna Regina (Wolf Hall) =

- Wolf Hall episode
- Episode no.: Series 1 Episode 3
- Directed by: Peter Kosminsky
- Written by: Peter Straughan
- Story by: Hilary Mantel
- Original air date: 4 February 2015
- Running time: 60 minutes

Episode chronology
← Previous "Entirely Beloved"	Next → "The Devil's Spit"

"Anna Regina" is the third episode of the BBC Two series Wolf Hall. It was first broadcast on 4 February 2015.

== Plot summary ==
In 1531, King Henry VIII pushes his cause of marrying Anne Boleyn by proposing a bill that would make him, and not the Pope, the head of the Church in England. Thomas Cromwell's influence in the king's affairs continues to grow, but he seeks more power.

== Cast ==
- Mark Rylance as Thomas Cromwell
- Jonathan Pryce as Thomas Wolsey
- Damian Lewis as Henry VIII of England
- Joanne Whalley as Catherine of Aragon
- Claire Foy as Anne Boleyn
- Jonathan Aris as James Bainham
- Bernard Hill as Thomas Howard, Duke of Norfolk
- Robert Wilfort as George Cavendish
- Anton Lesser as Thomas More
- Christopher Fairbank as Walter Cromwell
- Tom Holland as Gregory Cromwell
- Thomas Brodie Sangster as Rafe Sadler
- Harry Lloyd as Harry Percy
- Charity Wakefield as Mary Boleyn
- Jessica Raine as Jane Boleyn

== Critical reception ==
"Anna Regina" received positive reviews. The Daily Telegraph again gave the episode 5/5. Reviewer Tim Martin wrote that "Wolf Hall is getting better, and darker, with each episode," and called it a "stellar political drama, with a thrillingly delicate feel for the weight of words."
