= Donna Zakowska =

American costume designer (born 1954)

Donna Zakowska (born 1954) is an American costume designer. According to AMC, "Donna Zakowska has designed for film, theatre, circus, opera, music and puppet theatre, including nine seasons for the Big Apple Circus and a concert tour for Mick Jagger." Her costume designs for the John Adams won an Emmy Award in 2009. Zakowska's costumes for The Marvelous Mrs. Maisel won an Emmy Award for "Outstanding Period Costumes" in 2019.

== Life and early career ==
Donna Zakowska was born in Brooklyn in 1954. She attended Barnard College, the École des Beaux-Arts in Paris, and the Yale School of Drama.

Regarding her early career, Zakowska said "I began designing the Big Apple Circus and working as an assistant on Woody Allen films."

== Period costume, 18th century ==
Zakowska was head costume designer for HBO miniseries John Adams (2008). For her work on the series, she received an award from the Costume Designers Guild in 2008 and an Emmy in 2009.

Zakowska later became head costume designer for the AMC drama Turn: Washington's Spies, also set in the 18th century, which aired on AMC for four seasons, from April 2014 to August, 2017.

== The Marvelous Mrs Maisel ==
The Marvelous Mrs. Maisel is set in New York City in 1958. Zakowska describes her decision to work with series director Amy Sherman-Palladino as "instant chemistry. I’m a New Yorker and I loved the idea of working on a series about New York in the 50s. I've done eighteenth-century clothes, and earlier periods, but we have such clichés in our minds of what that period [the 1950s] looks like. It was a challenge to make this clothing interesting and exciting to people." Zakowska has cited multiple inspirations for the show's costumes, including period photographs, European fashion trends, and postwar New York City's many different cultures. Asked about her favorite costumes for the series, she mentioned the challenge of creating B. Altman costumes as "working dresses that still had the charm of the character."

Two costumes created by Zakowska for the show's first season are now in the collection of the Smithsonian's National Museum of American History.

== Awards and nominations ==
=== Emmy Awards ===
- Won: Outstanding Costumes for a Miniseries, Movie or a Special, John Adams (2008)
- Nominated: Outstanding Period Costumes, The Marvelous Mrs. Maisel (2018)
- Won: Outstanding Period Costumes, The Marvelous Mrs. Maisel (2019)
- Nominated: Outstanding Period Costumes, The Marvelous Mrs. Maisel (2020)

=== Costume Designers Guild Awards ===
- Won: Outstanding Made for Television Movie or Miniseries, John Adams (2008)
- Nominated: Excellence in Period Television, The Marvelous Mrs. Maisel (2018)
- Won: Excellence in Period Television, The Marvelous Mrs. Maisel (2019)
- Won: Excellence in Period Television, The Marvelous Mrs. Maisel (2020)
