= Wolf Hall (TV series) =

2015 British television drama series

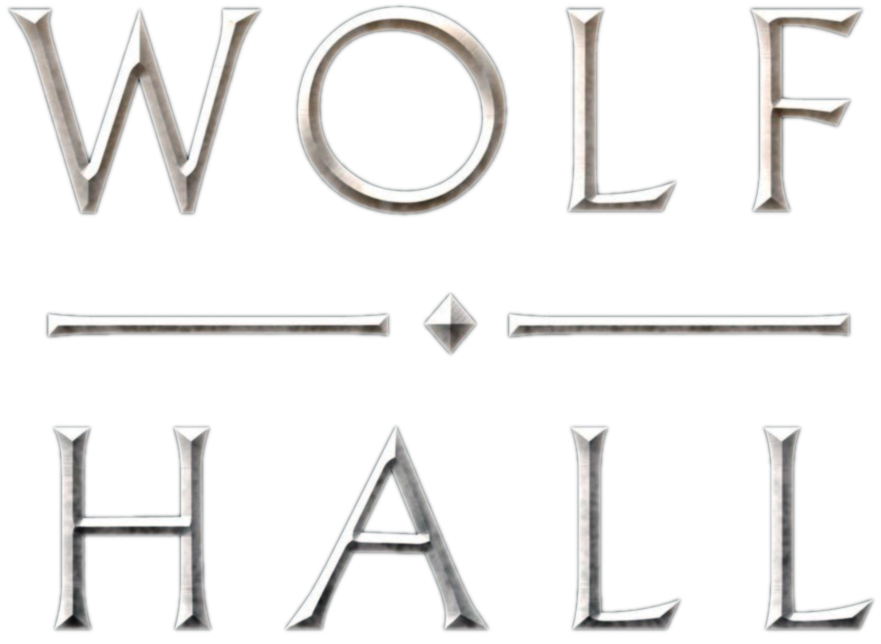
- Genre: Historical drama
- Based on: Wolf Hall and Bring Up the Bodies by Hilary Mantel
- Written by: Peter Straughan
- Directed by: Peter Kosminsky
- Starring: Mark Rylance; Damian Lewis; Claire Foy; Bernard Hill; Anton Lesser; Mark Gatiss; Mathieu Amalric; Joanne Whalley; Jonathan Pryce
- Composers: Original music by Debbie Wiseman; Tudor music by Claire van Kampen
- Country of origin: United Kingdom
- Original language: English
- No. of series: 2
- No. of episodes: 12

Production
- Executive producer: Colin Callender
- Producer: Mark Pybus
- Cinematography: Gavin Finney
- Running time: 60–65 minutes
- Production companies: Company Pictures; Playground Entertainment

Original release
- Network: BBC Two
- Release: 21 January – 25 February 2015
- Network: BBC One
- Release: 10 November – 15 December 2024

Wolf Hall is a British television series adaptation of the book trilogy of the same name by Hilary Mantel, a fictionalised biography documenting the life of Thomas Cromwell.

The six-part first series, based on the novels Wolf Hall and Bring Up the Bodies, was initially broadcast on BBC Two in January 2015. It documented the rapid rise to power of Thomas Cromwell in the court of Henry VIII, through the death of Sir Thomas More, to Cromwell's success in freeing the king of his marriage to Anne Boleyn. It was first broadcast abroad in April 2015 in the United States on PBS and in Australia on BBC First. The first series was a critical success and received eight nominations at the 67th Primetime Emmy Awards and three nominations at the 73rd Golden Globe Awards, winning for Best Miniseries or Television Film.

The second series, adapted from The Mirror & the Light, the final novel in the trilogy, featured Mark Rylance, director Peter Kosminsky, and writer Peter Straughan returning; it was filmed between November 2023 and April 2024 and was first broadcast on 10 November 2024.

== Plot ==
The series centres on the character of Thomas Cromwell, a lawyer who has risen from humble beginnings. The action in Series 1 opens at a point in Cromwell's career where his master, Cardinal Thomas Wolsey, is about to fall from power because of his failure to secure a marriage annulment for King Henry VIII of England. It proceeds through Cromwell's own rise to political power, and ends with the execution of Anne Boleyn. Series 2 picks up after Anne's execution, following Cromwell's continued rise and Henry's marriage to his third and fourth queens, Jane Seymour and Anne of Cleves, the latter of which will ultimately lead to Cromwell's fall from power and execution.

== Cast ==
=== Principal ===
- Mark Rylance as Thomas Cromwell
- Damian Lewis as Henry VIII
- Claire Foy as Anne Boleyn
- Bernard Hill^{[Series 1]} and Timothy Spall^{[Series 2]} as Duke of Norfolk
- Anton Lesser as Thomas More
- Mark Gatiss^{[Series 1]} and Alex Jennings^{[Series 2]} as Stephen Gardiner
- Mathieu Amalric^{[Series 1]} and Karim Kadjar^{[Series 2]} as Eustache Chapuys
- Joanne Whalley as Katherine of Aragon
- Lilit Lesser as Princess Mary
- Jonathan Pryce as Cardinal Wolsey
- Thomas Brodie-Sangster as Rafe Sadler
- Tom Holland^{[Series 1]} and Charlie Rowe^{[Series 2]} as Gregory Cromwell
- Harry Lloyd as Harry Percy
- Jessica Raine^{[Series 1]} and Lydia Leonard^{[Series 2]} as Jane Rochford
- Saskia Reeves as Johane Williamson
- Charity Wakefield as Mary Boleyn

=== Supporting ===
- Richard Dillane as Duke of Suffolk
- David Robb as Sir Thomas Boleyn
- Edward Holcroft as George Boleyn
- Joss Porter as Richard Cromwell
- Jonathan Aris as James Bainham
- Natasha Little as Liz Cromwell
- Will Keen as Thomas Cranmer
- Tim Steed as Lord Chancellor Audley
- Ed Speleers^{[Series 1]} and Will Tudor^{[Series 2]} as Edward Seymour
- Kate Phillips as Jane Seymour
- Paul Ritter as Sir John Seymour
- Enzo Cilenti as Antonio Bonvisi
- Luke Roberts as Harry Norris
- Alastair Mackenzie as William Brereton
- Max Fowler as Mark Smeaton
- Robert Wilfort as George Cavendish
- Aimee-Ffion Edwards as Elizabeth Barton
- Felix Scott as Francis Bryan
- Jacob Fortune-Lloyd as Francis Weston
- Bryan Dick^{[Series 1]} and Tom Mothersdale^{[Series 2]} as Richard Rich
- Lucy Russell as Lady Shelton
- James Larkin as Master Treasurer FitzWilliam
- Joel MacCormack^{[Series 1]} and Harry Melling^{[Series 2]} as Thomas Wriothesley
- Thomas Arnold as Hans Holbein the Younger
- Richard Durden as Bishop Fisher
- Sarah Crowden as Lady Exeter
- Janet Henfrey^{[Series 1]} and Harriet Walter^{[Series 2]} as Lady Margaret Pole
- Nigel Cooke as Sir Nicholas Carew
- Benjamin Whitrow as Archbishop Warham
- Maisie Richardson-Sellers as Bess Oughtred^{[Series 2]}
- Ellie de Lange as Jenneke ^{[Series 2]}
- Hannah Khalique-Brown as Dorothea^{[Series 2]}
- Dana Herfurth as Anne of Cleves ^{[Series 2]}
- Hannah Steele as Mary Shelton
- Paul Clayton as William Kingston
- Kerry Ingram as Alice Williamson
- Emma Hiddleston as Meg More
- Florence Bell as Helen Barre
- Iain Batchelor as Thomas Seymour
- Emilia Jones as Anne Cromwell
- Athena Droutis as Grace Cromwell
- Jack Lowden^{[Series 1]} and Amir El-Masry^{[Series 2]} as Thomas Wyatt

== Production ==
On 23 August 2012, BBC Two announced several new commissions, one of which was Wolf Hall. According to The Guardian £7 million was to be spent on the adaptation. BBC Two controller Janice Hadlow said it was "very fortunate to have the rights" to the two novels and called Wolf Hall "a great contemporary novel".

Peter Kosminsky, the director of the series, said: "This is a first for me. But it is an intensely political piece. It is about the politics of despotism, and how you function around an absolute ruler. I have a sense that Hilary Mantel wanted that immediacy. ... When I saw Peter Straughan's script, only a first draft, I couldn't believe what I was reading. It was the best draft I had ever seen. He had managed to distil 1,000 pages of the novels into six hours, using prose so sensitively. He's a theatre writer by trade."

The drama series features 102 characters and Kosminsky began casting the other parts in October 2013. Although originally set to film in Belgium, most of the filming took place on location at some of the finest British medieval and Tudor houses and buildings, including Berkeley Castle, Gloucester Cathedral and Horton Court in Gloucestershire, Dover Castle and Penshurst Place in Kent, Broughton Castle and Chastleton House in Oxfordshire, Wells Cathedral, Barrington Court, Cothay Manor and Montacute House in Somerset, Stanway House in Gloucestershire, and Sherborne School in Dorset, Bristol Cathedral in Bristol, St Donat's Castle in the Vale of Glamorgan, Hospital of St Cross in Hampshire, and Great Chalfield Manor and Lacock Abbey in Wiltshire. In all, 28 locations were used, mostly in the south-west of England. The series was filmed from May to July 2014. The series, which was made in association with Masterpiece Entertainment and Playground Entertainment, consists of six episodes and was broadcast on BBC Two in the UK from 21 January 2015.

The Guardian speculated that the BBC's hiring of Kosminsky with Straughan showed they wanted "a darker and grittier take on British history" than more fanciful programmes such as The Tudors or The White Queen. Mantel called Straughan's scripts a "miracle of elegant compression and I believe with such a strong team the original material can only be enhanced".

Kosminsky determined to undertake much of the interior filming by candlelight; this led some of the actors to collide with the scenery and raised concerns about the risk of fires. Wolf Hall was filmed in two locations in Kent: Dover Castle doubled for the Tower of London, and the Long Gallery, Tapestry Room, and Queen Elizabeth Room at Penshurst Place were used as specific rooms in Whitehall (York Place), which was Anne Boleyn and Henry VIII's residence. The Long Gallery doubled as Anne Boleyn's chamber. Some scenes were filmed at Stanway House in Gloucestershire.

The series' executive producer, Colin Callender, stated in February 2015 that he hoped that the BBC would commission an extension of the series based on the final novel in Mantel's trilogy, The Mirror & the Light, which was published in 2020. Callender said that lead performers Mark Rylance and Damian Lewis were "eager" to return.

A second series of Wolf Hall was confirmed on 27 May 2019, officially announced as Wolf Hall: The Mirror and the Light, and began filming on 24 November 2023 with Mark Rylance, Thomas Brodie-Sangster, Damian Lewis, Jonathan Pryce, Kate Phillips and Lilit Lesser all reprising their roles from the previous series.

On 4 April 2024 the BBC announced that filming of the second series had been completed, and revealed details of several roles that had been recast, including Timothy Spall as the Duke of Norfolk (replacing Bernard Hill), Harriet Walter as Lady Margaret Pole (replacing Janet Henfrey), and Harry Melling as Thomas Wriothesley (replacing Joel MacCormack).

== Episodes ==
=== Series 1 (2015) ===
No. in series	Title	Directed by	Written by	Original air date (BBC Two)	U.S. air date	UK viewers (millions)
1	"Three Card Trick"	Peter Kosminsky	Peter Straughan	21 January 2015	5 April 2015	5.99
In 1529, as Cardinal Wolsey receives news of his dismissal as Lord Chancellor, his lawyer Thomas Cromwell reminisces about how he and Wolsey met and the events leading up to the Cardinal's downfall.
2	"Entirely Beloved"	Peter Kosminsky	Peter Straughan	28 January 2015	12 April 2015	4.46
As 1529 draws to a close, Cardinal Wolsey moves to York while Thomas Cromwell attempts to gain support for him from King Henry VIII and Anne Boleyn and, in the process, gradually wins favour for himself.
3	"Anna Regina"	Peter Kosminsky	Peter Straughan	4 February 2015	19 April 2015	4.13
In 1531, King Henry VIII has proposed a bill which will make him the head of the Church in England and allow him to marry Anne Boleyn. However, his plans are met with a series of complications.
4	"The Devil's Spit"	Peter Kosminsky	Peter Straughan	11 February 2015	26 April 2015	4.29
In 1533, Anne Boleyn has given birth to a daughter, much to King Henry VIII's disdain. As Anne's paranoia over her inability to produce a son grows, Thomas Cromwell tries to convince Sir Thomas More to show approval for the royal marriage.
5	"Crows"	Peter Kosminsky	Peter Straughan	18 February 2015	3 May 2015	3.72
In 1535, King Henry VIII's becoming head of the Church in England has antagonised the Holy Roman Emperor. Meanwhile, Anne Boleyn's failure to produce a male heir leads Henry toward Jane Seymour.
6	"Master of Phantoms"	Peter Kosminsky	Peter Straughan	25 February 2015	10 May 2015	3.74
The Exeter Conspiracy is in the works. In 1536, King Henry VIII's request that Thomas Cromwell find a way to rid him of Anne Boleyn—a sentiment supported by others who wish for Jane Seymour to take her place—leads to a series of allegations and revelations.

=== Series 2: The Mirror and the Light (2024) ===
No. in series	Title	Directed by	Written by	Original air date (BBC One)	U.S. air date	UK viewers (millions)
1	"Wreckage"	Peter Kosminsky	Peter Straughan	10 November 2024	23 March 2025	4.06
2	"Obedience"	Peter Kosminsky	Peter Straughan	17 November 2024	30 March 2025	3.49
3	"Defiance"	Peter Kosminsky	Peter Straughan	24 November 2024	6 April 2025	3.40
4	"Jenneke"	Peter Kosminsky	Peter Straughan	1 December 2024	13 April 2025	3.23
5	"Mirror"	Peter Kosminsky	Peter Straughan	8 December 2024	20 April 2025	3.25
6	"Light"	Peter Kosminsky	Peter Straughan	15 December 2024	27 April 2025	3.29

== Reception ==
Critics have been "almost unanimous" in their praise of the initial series, with particular reference to the attention to period detail, the faithful adaptation of the source novels, Kosminsky's direction, and the performances of the leading cast members, particularly Rylance as Cromwell and Foy as Boleyn. Review aggregator Rotten Tomatoes gave the show a 98% rating based on 53 reviews with an average rating of 8.4/10. The website's critical consensus states, "Beautifully filmed and brilliantly acted, Wolf Hall masterfully brings Hilary Mantel's award-winning novels to life." Sam Wollaston in The Guardian called it "sumptuous, intelligent, event television." Will Dean in The Independent felt that it did not compare favourably with the stage adaptation of the book, yet he predicted that it would "secure a devoted following." James Walton in The Daily Telegraph gave the first episode five stars out of five, commenting: "it's hard to see how this one could have been done much better." Mick Adam Noya from the television review show Channel Crossing called Wolf Hall "the best show of 2015". Sophie Gilbert of The Atlantic wrote, "Magnificent...a tour de force."

A few dissenting voices found some flaws. The Daily Telegraph alleged that there was a substantial drop in ratings between the first and second episodes, despite all the following episodes holding high and consistent ratings. Simon Schama stated concerns about how the series depicted historical figures. Emily Nussbaum of The New Yorker cited "small weaknesses", but wrote "the show's deliberately paced six hours turn out to be riveting, precisely because they are committed, without apology or, often, much explanation, to the esotericism of their subject matter."

The Mirror and the Light generated controversy over the inclusion of non-white actors, a departure from the first series. Colin Callender, the founder of Playground Entertainment, the company that produced the series, addressed the "color-blind" casting issue, saying, "The world has changed since the first series. We felt that diverse casting was appropriate and something we should and wanted to do. It's as simple as that." However, the choice drew criticism, including from the journalist and author, Petronella Wyatt, a descendant of Thomas Wyatt who was portrayed in the series by a British actor originally from Egypt. Writing in The Daily Telegraph, she called the decision "absurd" and said "to portray English aristocrats as black or mixed-race is, conversely, an act of racism, as it suggests that ethnic minorities in Tudor Britain had the doors of society flung open to them, when in fact they led drear and oppressed lives."

The lighting design, which used historically accurate natural light sources (such as candlelight for evening scenes) prompted criticism from some viewers who felt many scenes appeared too dark.

== International broadcast ==
- Australia: BBC First premiered the series on 11 April 2015 and it was watched by 46,000 viewers.
- United States: PBS broadcast the series on Masterpiece from 5 April 2015 to 10 May 2015. The series was subsequently licensed to Amazon Prime.
- Germany / France: Arte broadcast the series on 21 and 28 January 2016.

== Accolades ==
For the 5th Critics' Choice Television Awards, the first series received four nominations: Best Limited Series, Mark Rylance for Best Actor, Jonathan Pryce for Best Supporting Actor, and Claire Foy for Best Supporting Actress.

Award	Category	Recipients	Outcome
BAFTA TV Awards	Best Drama Series	Wolf Hall	Won
BAFTA TV Awards	Best Actor	Mark Rylance	Won
BAFTA TV Awards	Best Actress	Claire Foy	Nominated
BAFTA TV Awards	Best Supporting Actor	Anton Lesser	Nominated
BAFTA TV Craft Awards	Best Editing – Fiction	David Blackmore	Nominated
BAFTA TV Craft Awards	Best Costume Design	Joanna Eatwell	Nominated
BAFTA TV Craft Awards	Best Photography and Lighting – Fiction	Gavin Finney	Nominated
BAFTA TV Craft Awards	Best Sound – Fiction and Entertainment	Rodney Berling, Simon Clark, Peter Gates, James Hayday, and Rob Hughes	Won
British Society of Cinematographers Awards	Best Cinematography in a Television Drama	Gavin Finney (for "Entirely Beloved")	Won
Critics' Choice Television Awards	Best Limited Series	Wolf Hall	Nominated
Critics' Choice Television Awards	Best Actor in a Movie/Miniseries	Mark Rylance	Nominated
Critics' Choice Television Awards	Best Supporting Actor in a Movie/Miniseries	Jonathan Pryce	Nominated
Critics' Choice Television Awards	Best Supporting Actress in a Movie/Miniseries	Claire Foy	Nominated
Golden Globe Awards	Best Miniseries or Television Film	Wolf Hall	Won
Golden Globe Awards	Best Actor	Mark Rylance	Nominated
Golden Globe Awards	Best Supporting Actor	Damian Lewis	Nominated
2015 Peabody Awards	Entertainment	Wolf Hall	Won
Primetime Emmy Awards	Outstanding Limited Series	Wolf Hall	Nominated
Primetime Emmy Awards	Outstanding Lead Actor in a Limited Series or Movie	Mark Rylance	Nominated
Primetime Emmy Awards	Outstanding Supporting Actor in a Limited Series or Movie	Damian Lewis	Nominated
Primetime Emmy Awards	Outstanding Directing for a Limited Series, Movie, or Dramatic Special	Peter Kosminsky	Nominated
Primetime Emmy Awards	Outstanding Writing for a Limited Series, Movie, or Dramatic Special	Peter Straughan	Nominated
Primetime Creative Arts Emmy Awards	Outstanding Casting for a Limited Series, Movie, or Special	Nina Gold and Robert Sterne	Nominated
Primetime Creative Arts Emmy Awards	Outstanding Costumes for a Period/Fantasy Series, Limited Series or Movie	Joanna Eatwell, Ken Lang, and Clare Vyse	Nominated
Primetime Creative Arts Emmy Awards	Outstanding Single-Camera Picture Editing for a Limited Series or Movie	David Blackmore	Nominated
Royal Television Society Programme Awards	Drama Serial	Wolf Hall	Nominated
Royal Television Society Programme Awards	Actor: Female	Claire Foy	Nominated
Royal Television Society Craft & Design Awards	Editing – Drama	David Blackmore	Nominated
Royal Television Society Craft & Design Awards	Photography – Drama	Gavin Finney	Nominated
Royal Television Society Craft & Design Awards	Sound – Drama	Sound Team	Nominated
Royal Television Society Craft & Design Awards	Judges' Award	Production Team	Won
Satellite Awards	Best Miniseries or Television Film	Wolf Hall	Nominated
Satellite Awards	Best Actor – Miniseries or Television Film	Mark Rylance	Won
Satellite Awards	Best Actor – Miniseries or Television Film	Damian Lewis	Nominated
Satellite Awards	Best Actress – Miniseries or Television Film	Claire Foy	Nominated
Screen Actors Guild Awards	Outstanding Performance by a Male Actor in a Miniseries or Television Movie	Mark Rylance	Nominated
TCA Awards	Outstanding Achievement in Movies, Miniseries, and Specials	Wolf Hall	Nominated
