= The Player (2015 TV series) =

American action crime television series

- Also known as: Endgame
- Genre: Crime drama; Action; Thriller
- Created by: John Rogers; John Fox
- Starring: Philip Winchester; Charity Wakefield; Damon Gupton; Wesley Snipes
- Composer: Dominic Lewis
- Country of origin: United States
- Original language: English
- No. of seasons: 1
- No. of episodes: 9

Production
- Executive producers: Bharat Nalluri: John Davis; John Fox; John Rogers
- Producers: Danielle Weinstock; Jennifer Court
- Production locations: Albuquerque, New Mexico (Pilot only); Santa Clarita, California
- Cinematography: Nathaniel Goodman; Tom Camarda
- Camera setup: Single-camera
- Running time: 42–43 minutes
- Production companies: Davis Entertainment; Kung Fu Monkey Productions; Universal Television; Sony Pictures Television

Original release
- Network: NBC
- Release: September 24 – November 19, 2015

The Player (formerly known as Endgame) is an American action thriller crime drama television series created by John Rogers and John Fox, starring Philip Winchester, Wesley Snipes and Charity Wakefield. NBC ordered the pilot to series on May 8, 2015, and the show aired from September 24, to November 19, 2015 for one season. Because of low ratings, the count of episodes was reduced to nine (thirteen had originally been ordered), with the production wrapping up after shooting the ninth episode. Before that, Sony sold the series' airing rights to 105 international territories.

== Premise ==
The life of Alex Kane (Phillip Winchester), a security expert in Las Vegas, is turned upside down during an evening with his ex-wife Ginny, as she is killed by unknown assailants. Eager to track down Ginny's murderers, Kane runs into a high-stakes gambling operation run by Isaiah Johnson (Wesley Snipes), the "Pit Boss", and Cassandra King (Charity Wakefield), the "Dealer". Johnson and King organize betting on crimes, pitting a "Player" against criminals. King helps the Player with almost unlimited resources as the gamblers bet on who will gain the upper hand over a limited timeframe. Kane is recruited as the organization's latest Player.

== Cast ==
=== Main ===
- Philip Winchester as Alex Kane, "The Player"
- Charity Wakefield as Cassandra King, the dealer
- Damon Gupton as Detective Cal Brown, Las Vegas Police Department
- Wesley Snipes as Mr. Isaiah Johnson, the pit boss

=== Recurring ===
- Daisy Betts as Virginia "Ginny" Lee, Alex's ex-wife
- Nick Wechsler as Nick, Cassandra's boyfriend
- Richard Roundtree as Judge Samuel Letts
- KaDee Strickland as Special Agent Rose Nolan
- Courtney Grosbeck as Dani, Alex's niece

== Broadcast ==
In Australia, the series premiered on October 7, 2015 on the Seven Network. In Spain, the series premiered on December 7, 2015 on the AXN. In the United Kingdom, the series premiered on October 21, 2016 on Spike. In Mexico, the series premiered on March 1, 2019 on Azteca 7.

== Episodes ==
No.	Title	Directed by	Written by	Original release date	US viewers (millions)
1	"Pilot"	Bharat Nalluri	Story by : John Rogers & John Fox; Teleplay by : John Rogers	September 24, 2015	4.68
Alex Kane is a security expert in Las Vegas, Nevada. He meets his ex-wife Ginny and they spend an intimate evening together. But at night, an intruder in her apartment shoots her. In pursuit, Alex is hit by a car driven by a woman named Cassandra and lands in the hospital where he is held as a suspect for the murder, but he escapes and is picked up by Cassandra who introduces him to her boss Mr. Johnson. They are from a powerful secret intelligence organization and use their information to run a betting game on the outcome of crimes. They want Alex to stop the kidnappers of his client's daughter, the same people who also killed Ginny, but he cannot tell anyone. When Alex tracks them down, LVPD arrest everyone. Alex is then freed by Mr. Johnson, who claims to be FBI. They offer him the job as "The Player" in their betting game, where Cassandra is "The Dealer" and Mr. Johnson is "The Pit Boss", which Alex declines at first. At the morgue, he finds that Ginny's body is missing her ring tattoo. Suspicious, he returns and accepts the job offer. He accepts the terms, he cannot talk to anyone about the game except Cassandra and the position is for life. In the end, Cassandra deletes photos showing her together with a woman who looks like Ginny.
2	"Ante Up"	Michael J. Bassett	Jim Campolongo	October 1, 2015	4.58
Alex has to stop a group of robbers who have attacked money transport trucks and now want to launder their loot. In the casino, Alex meets Dominic McCall who he knows from Special Forces, and right afterwards is caught by the gangsters. Cassandra needs to helps Alex escape, but he is too late to prevent another robbery by McCall's group, so Alex loses the game. Johnson visits a pentagon contact and has Tomas Edribali, Ginny's murderer, killed by an airstrike. Alex demands a second chance to stop McCall for a double or nothing game, and this time he wins. Alex is angry to learn that Edribali was killed, and Detective Brown becomes suspicious about Alex's role in the recent events. A DNA test to compare the body at the morgue with Ginny's hairbrush returns a match. Johnson knows about the test and offers Alex help to find out the truth. Alex discovers a Micro-SD card in an old photo of Ginny. Cassandra is visited by her boyfriend Nick.
3	"L.A. Takedown"	Bill Johnson	VJ Boyd	October 8, 2015	4.43
Alex's new game is to stop sniper Aaron Suarez, who is killing for a Mexican cartel, before Suarez can find his next victim. This time, Cassandra needs to help Alex in the field. FBI agent Rose Nolan asks Detective Brown to investigate about the missing Justin Foucault. Foucault's wife tells him about suspicious meetings with a woman. The investigation triggers Cassandra's warning system, as Foucault was the previous player, and also in Alex's special ops team. Nolan knows that there is a number of former special forces operatives who worked for a secret organization and then disappeared. Alex asks his friend Donovan to retrieve the phone information from the memory card that he found, but Mr. Johnson threatens Donovan, so Donovan lies and only hands part of what he finds to Alex.
4	"The Big Blind"	Oz Scott	Jessica Grasl	October 15, 2015	3.99
Alex's current assignments deals with an assassination plot supposedly meant for his client. However, he finds out that the client himself engineered the assassination plot meant for his wife, a friend of Ginny's. Alex neutralizes the threat of the five assassins involved with the plot, and Cal arrests the client with the aid of anonymous evidence. Alex attempts to confront Mr. Johnson about his wife, only to be blown off.
5	"House Rules"	Michael J. Bassett	Amanda Segel	October 22, 2015	4.15
Alex is tasked with protecting an Indian student, Solomon Desai, who is targeted by a Chinese Triad gang and the National Security Agency for supposedly hacking into the Pentagon. He later learns that the student only witnessed the hack and had no part in it, but knows the method of stopping it. Meanwhile, Mr. Johnson kills the ringleader, Liu Zeng, responsible for the plot in hand-to-hand combat for breaking the rules. During the aftermath, Alex retrieves a phone number after having Solomon decipher the altered computer files, and uses it to have a short-lived telephone conversation with Ginny.
6	"The Norseman"	Steven A. Adelson	Nick Antosca	October 29, 2015	3.87
Alex's recent criminal bet is to stop is The Norseman, a serial killer who severs hands and heads as ritual sacrifices to appease the Norse pagan gods. The Norseman's history has crossed paths with Cal in the past, where Alex and Cal arrest him before claiming a victim. However, after a short confession that the killer and his brother were behind the previous murders, the Norseman escapes, this time kidnapping Alex's niece, Dani, to complete his sacrifice. Alex successfully rescues Dani while Mr. Johnson kills the Norseman in a melee fight. During the aftermath, Mr. Johnson has a brief conversation with Agent Nolan warning her of her vulnerability, and later relays information to Alex of video footage of Ginny being sighted at Miami International Airport.
7	"A House Is Not a Home"	Nick Copus	SJ Hodges	November 5, 2015	3.22
A series of bombings against a banking firm in Chicago draws Alex to a vengeful vigilante whose family was victimized from bank fraud. Mr. Johnson visits his friend, Judge Samuel Letts and learns that there may be traitors within his house. During the aftermath of the crisis, Cassandra pursues an independent investigation into Ginny's recent sighting, while Alex learns from his mother-in-law that Ginny may not be who she seems after finding an unidentified key in her belongings.
8	"Downtown Odds"	Brad Tanenbaum	Mike Ostrowski	November 12, 2015	3.44
Alex is thrust into stopping a costly gang war that was engineered by an Eastern-European criminal. Meanwhile, Nolan attempts to dig into Johnson's background over dinner. Meanwhile, Cassandra is forced to cut her relationship with Nick in order to keep him safe from her line of work. During the aftermath, Cassandra leads Alex to her recent findings, prompting Alex to give her the unidentified key for examination.
9	"Tell"	Bobby Roth	Patrick Massett & John Zinman	November 19, 2015	3.41
Alex and Cassandra's investigation of the key leads them to a storage unit owned by Ginny. They later engineer a game in order to find a former U.S. marshal responsible for Ginny's disappearance, leading to a series of chaotic events. Cal and Nolan capture and interrogate Cassandra, unaware that their target engineered it to probe their investigation. Meanwhile, Johnson makes preparations for defending his house from unknown threats. Alex's pursuit of his target unwittingly places Cal in danger, leading to the end of their friendship. During the aftermath, Cassandra persuades Johnson to give up the former U.S. marshal in order to keep Alex in their employ. Alex learns from the former marshal that Ginny engineered her disappearance to escape an unknown threat. After Alex spends the night in the storage unit, he finds a movable wall and discovers a hidden weapons arsenal.

== Reception ==
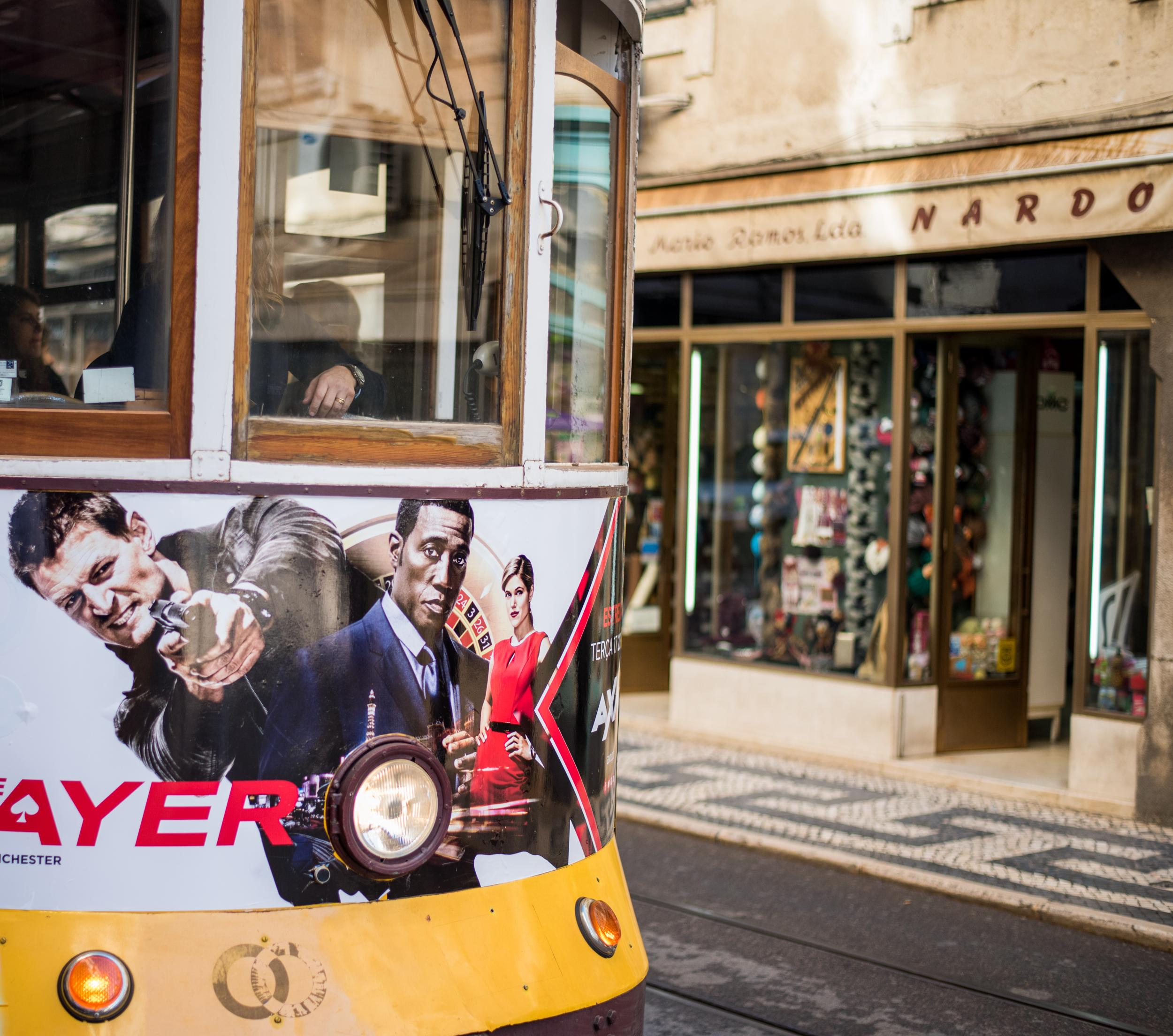
Late 2015 advertisement for the AXN airing in Portugal, on a Lisbon tram.

Rotten Tomatoes assessed the series' approval rating at 38%, with an average rating of 4.1/10, sampled from 45 reviews. Their critic consensus states: "The Player's convoluted premise weighs down a game cast, bringing nothing original to the table". On Metacritic, it holds a 43 out of 100, based on 25 critics' reviews, signifying "mixed or average reviews".

=== Ratings ===
No.	Episode	Air date	Time slot (EST)	Rating/share (18–49)	Viewers (millions)	DVR (18–49)	DVR viewers (millions)	Total (18–49)	Total viewers (millions)
1	"Pilot"	September 24, 2015	Thursdays; 10:00 p.m.	1.2/4	4.68	0.7	2.59	1.9	7.45
2	"Ante Up"	October 1, 2015	Thursdays; 10:00 p.m.	1.0/3	4.58	0.6	2.58	1.6	7.15
3	"L.A. Takedown"	October 8, 2015	Thursdays; 10:00 p.m.	0.9/3	4.43	—N/a	2.11	—N/a	6.54
4	"The Big Blind"	October 15, 2015	Thursdays; 10:00 p.m.	0.7/2	3.99	0.6	2.12	1.3	6.12
5	"House Rules"	October 22, 2015	Thursdays; 10:00 p.m.	0.8/3	4.15	—N/a	2.04	—N/a	6.20
6	"The Norseman"	October 29, 2015	Thursdays; 10:00 p.m.	0.7/2	3.87	0.7	—N/a	1.4	—N/a
7	"A House Is Not a Home"	November 5, 2015	Thursdays; 10:00 p.m.	0.7/2	3.22	0.5	2.01	1.2	5.23
8	"Downtown Odds"	November 12, 2015	Thursdays; 10:00 p.m.	0.7/3	3.44	0.5	1.86	1.2	5.30
9	"Tell"	November 19, 2015	Thursdays; 10:00 p.m.	0.8/3	3.41	—N/a	1.88	—N/a	5.29

== See also ==
- List of television shows set in Las Vegas
