= The Great (TV series) =

British-American television series, 2020–2023

- The series' title card
- Also known as: The Great: An Occasionally True Story; The Great: An Almost Entirely Untrue Story
- Genre: Comedy-drama; Dark comedy; Historical fiction; Satire; Absurdist humor
- Created by: Tony McNamara
- Starring: Elle Fanning; Nicholas Hoult; Phoebe Fox; Sacha Dhawan; Charity Wakefield; Gwilym Lee; Adam Godley; Douglas Hodge; Belinda Bromilow; Bayo Gbadamosi; Sebastian de Souza; Florence Keith-Roach; Danusia Samal; Freddie Fox; Grace Molony
- Music by: Nathan Barr
- Countries of origin: United Kingdom; United States
- Original language: English
- No. of seasons: 3
- No. of episodes: 30

Production
- Executive producers: Tony McNamara; Elle Fanning; Nicholas Hoult; Marian Macgowan; Mark Winemaker; Brittany Kahan Ward; Doug Mankoff; Andrew Spaulding; Josh Kesselman; Ron West; Matt Shakman
- Producers: Dean O'Toole; Nick O'Hagan (pilot only)
- Running time: 50–61 minutes
- Production companies: Thruline Entertainment; Echo Lake Entertainment; Lewellen Pictures; Macgowan Films; Piggy Ate Roast Beef Productions; Civic Center Media; MRC Television

Original release
- Network: Hulu
- Release: May 15, 2020 – May 12, 2023

The Great (titled onscreen as The Great: An Occasionally True Story and in one episode as The Great: An Almost Entirely Untrue Story) is a British-American absurdist satirical dark comedy–drama historical fiction television series, very loosely based on the rise to power of Empress Catherine the Great of Russia. The series stars Elle Fanning as Catherine, and Nicholas Hoult as both Emperor Peter III and Peter's body double Yemelyan Pugachev. The Great was created, and mostly written, by Australian playwright and screenwriter Tony McNamara, based on his 2008 play of the same name. The series, which aired on Hulu, does not aim for historical accuracy; Hulu promotional materials described it as "anti-historical".

All ten episodes of the first season were released on Hulu on May 15, 2020. In July 2020, it was renewed for a second season which premiered on November 19, 2021. In January 2022, the series was renewed for a third season which premiered on May 12, 2023. The first season received mostly positive reviews, while the second and third seasons received critical acclaim, with particular praise for its directing, writing, humor, costumes, and cast performances (particularly those of Fanning and Hoult). It has received numerous accolades, including seven Primetime Emmy Awards nominations, with both Fanning and Hoult being nominated for Outstanding Lead Actress and Lead Actor in a Comedy Series, respectively, in 2022. In August 2023, Hulu announced the series' third season had been its last.

== Premise ==
The Great is a historical and satirical black comedy-drama about the rise of Catherine the Great from outsider to the longest-reigning female ruler in Russia's history. The series is highly fictionalized, portraying Catherine in her youth and in her marriage to Emperor Peter III of Russia. It focuses on the plot to kill her depraved and dangerous husband.

== Cast and characters ==
= Main cast (credited)
= Recurring cast (3+)
= Guest cast (1–2)

Actor	Character	Seasons		
Actor	Character	1	2	3
Main cast
Elle Fanning	Catherine the Great	Main	Main	Main
Nicholas Hoult	Peter III of Russia	Main	Main	Main
Nicholas Hoult	Yemelyan Pugachev		Recurring	Recurring
Phoebe Fox	Marial Brezhnev	Main	Main	Main
Sacha Dhawan	Count Orlo	Main	Main	Main (Note: Dhawan appears in only one episode of season 3 although credited with the main cast.)
Charity Wakefield	Georgina "George" Dymov	Main	Main	Main
Gwilym Lee	Grigor Dymov	Main	Main	Main
Adam Godley	Archbishop "Archie" Samsa	Main	Main	Main
Douglas Hodge	General Velementov	Main	Main	Main
Belinda Bromilow	Elizabeth	Main	Main	Main
Bayo Gbadamosi	Arkady	Main	Main	Main
Sebastian de Souza	Leo Voronsky	Main		
Florence Keith-Roach	Tatyana	Recurring	Main	Main
Danusia Samal	Lady Antonia Svenska	Recurring	Main	
Freddie Fox	King Hugo of Sweden	Guest	Recurring	Main
Grace Molony	Queen Agnes of Sweden	Guest	Recurring	Main
Recurring cast
Louis Hynes	Vlad	Recurring		
Jamie Demetriou	Doctor Chekov	Recurring		
Christophe Tek	Tartar Nick	Recurring		
Charlie Price	Ivan	Recurring		
Alistair Green	Count Smolny	Recurring	Recurring	Recurring
Abraham Popoola	Alexei Rostov	Recurring		
Stewart Scudamore	Tolsten	Recurring		
Christianne Oliveira	Countess Belanova	Recurring	Recurring	Recurring
Blake Harrison	Colonel Svenska	Recurring	Recurring	
Kemi-Bo Jacobs	Marina	Recurring		
Dustin Demri-Burns	Voltaire	Guest	Recurring	Recurring
Tristan Beint	Lieutenant Bukharin	Guest		
Tristan Beint	Soldier Alexi		Recurring	
Ashwin Bolar	Doctor Smirnov	Guest	Recurring	Guest
Keon Martial-Phillip	Russian POW	Guest		
Keon Martial-Phillip	Soldier Vasily		Recurring	
Keon Martial-Phillip	Guard			Guest
Julian Barratt	Dr. Vinodel		Recurring	Recurring
Jane Mahady	Katya Velcra		Recurring	Recurring
Anthony Welsh	Father Basil		Recurring	
Ali Ariaie	Raskolvy		Recurring	Recurring
Ramon Tikaram	Uncle Varnya		Recurring	
Timothy Walker	Soldier Emile		Recurring	
Eloise Webb	Sylvana		Recurring	
Kiki May	Nadia		Recurring	Guest
Gethin Alderman	Jean Pierre		Recurring	Guest
Sam Coulson	Pugachev / Peter double		Recurring	
Danielle Galligan	Yula		Recurring	
Minnie Gale	Fedora		Recurring	
Richard Pyros	Count Raskolnikov	Guest		Recurring
Henry Meredith	Maxim		Guest	Recurring
Emily Coates	Petra			Recurring
Jacob Fortune-Lloyd	Grigory Petrov			Recurring
Special guests (Note: The following list of guest stars appear in 1–2 episodes per season although credited with the main cast.)
Gillian Anderson	Joanna Elisabeth of Holstein-Gottorp		Guest	
Jason Isaacs	Peter the Great		Guest	Guest

== Episodes ==
=== Series overview ===
Season	Episodes	Originally released
1	10	May 15, 2020
2	10	November 19, 2021
3	10	May 12, 2023

=== Season 1 (2020) ===
No. overall	No. in season	Title	Directed by	Written by	Original release date
1	1	"The Great"	Matt Shakman	Written for Television by : Tony McNamara	May 15, 2020
In the eighteenth century, young, educated and highly optimistic German noblewoman Catherine marries Emperor Peter of Russia. Her ambitions and optimism shatter as she discovers Peter's frivolous, cruel, and spiteful nature, and realizes that in Russia citizens are mistreated, women are not educated and religion influences most government decisions. Catherine finds an unexpected friend in her maid, Marial, a former noblewoman demoted to serfdom. She also discovers that Peter's longtime mistress, Georgina, is also the wife of his best friend, Grigor, who admits to Catherine that the arrangement is painful but he loves Peter and his wife. Catherine obtains Peter's permission to establish a school, but he burns it down after learning that it is intended for girls. When Peter shoots the bear he gave to Catherine during a party, she slaps him in front of everyone and he responds by punching and threatening her later in private. Catherine, now little more than a prisoner, decides to escape with the help of Marial, but Peter finds out and nearly drowns her as punishment. Disheartened, Catherine is about to slit her wrists when Marial informs her about a law in Russia: if an emperor dies without an heir, the throne will pass to the empress. Catherine begins to plot to overthrow her husband.
2	2	"A Fake Beard"	Colin Bucksey	Tony McNamara	May 15, 2020
As Catherine and Marial seek to arrange Peter's death, Marial suggests seducing Orlo, a member of Peter's inner circle. Catherine fails to seduce Orlo and tells her plan to him. Peter apologizes to Catherine for his prior behavior and suggests providing her with a lover, but Catherine reacts negatively. Orlo tries to help Count Rostov, who has been commanded to shave off his beard in accordance with law. An enraged Peter decides to kill Catherine in a carriage accident. Archie (the archbishop) warns her and she feigns affection and submissiveness, causing Peter to reconsider. She learns about Peter's strict mother, who is kept mummified in a glass case since he refuses to bury her. Catherine fails to persuade Orlo to cooperate, but he keeps her secret. When Peter forces Orlo to shave Rostov's beard, Orlo switches allegiances and agrees to support Catherine's plans.
3	3	"And You Sir, Are No Peter the Great"	Bert & Bertie	Tony McNamara	May 15, 2020
Catherine and Orlo prepare for their new era, whilst Peter offers a lover to Catherine, Leo Voronsky, the sterile son of a legendary charming and promiscuous man. Orlo suspects Leo is spying for Peter. Catherine asks Leo to pretend he has slept with her. The next day, she assures Peter that she and Leo had a great night and asks him to let Leo go. Unconvinced, Peter beats Leo for not convincing her to keep him, leading Catherine to insist she wants Leo to stay. Orlo and Marial suggest using Ivan, Peter's half-brother, against him. Catherine locates Ivan, who is hidden in a secret room in the castle with the help of Aunt Elizabeth. Catherine embarrasses Lady Svenska at ladies' tea in retaliation for beating Marial, causing the ladies to turn on her. When Peter gives a speech about the greatness of his father, he gets emotional and an officer mocks him. Encouraged by Catherine to show his real emotions, he stabs the officer. Peter encourages Catherine to take a lover of her own choice, but Catherine accepts Leo and begins a passionate relationship with him.
4	4	"Moscow Mule"	Bert & Bertie	Tess Morris	May 15, 2020
Catherine and Leo pursue their love affair. News arrives that the patriarch, the Russian Orthodox church leader, has died and Peter must choose a new one by the following day. Catherine, Marial, and Orlo continue to plan for their new era, aiming to appoint the liberal Bishop Tarcinkus as the new church leader, believing he will support Catherine. Catherine learns that Lady Svenska is spreading rumours about her having had sex with a horse, and tries to make amends for political reasons, but is rejected. One bishop renounces Peter and commits self-immolation during the selection of the Patriarch of Moscow and all Rus'. Catherine tries to gain the other ladies' admiration by gifting Fabergé eggs, but Georgina advises her not to come begging this way. Lady Svenska invites Catherine to a tea, at which the ladies push, kick, and belittle her. Peter instructs Archie to receive a vision from God to decide on the new bishop. He consumes psychedelic mushrooms in the forest and Catherine stumbles upon him as he hallucinates. He believes her to be an angel and she tells him that he is the rightful patriarch. At the celebration for Archie becoming the new patriarch, Catherine gossips with the court ladies about Leo, as they had previously requested, and pretends to harshly discipline Marial for mentioning the horse rumor.
5	5	"War and Vomit"	Ben Chessell	James Wood	May 15, 2020
Catherine and Elizabeth visit the Russian front amid the war with Sweden. Appalled by the horrors she witnesses, Catherine becomes determined to gain the throne in a nonviolent manner. She fails to convince Peter to withdraw the military. Grigor, who has long sublimated his jealousy and anger toward Peter for having sex with his wife, impulsively poisons Peter's borscht with arsenic. Peter falls gravely ill, leaving Catherine next in line for the throne, but her claim is threatened by the existence of Ivan and the sudden prospect of becoming Empress causes Catherine to appear incompetent and unprepared for power. Elizabeth murders Ivan to prevent a civil war should Peter die. Catherine's newfound pacifism causes tension between her, Marial, and Orlo, who try to convince her that she must engage in bloodshed as Empress. As Catherine and Marial squabble over whether or not to kill Peter, he awakens, having recovered.
6	6	"Parachute"	Ben Chessell	Tony McNamara	May 15, 2020
Peter feels inspired to better himself after his brush with death. Elizabeth encourages Peter to sire an heir, leading him to seek out Catherine. As Peter has become more tender and open to change, they become more intimate, putting a strain on her relationship with Leo. Catherine uses Peter's newfound interest in her to encourage him to bring arts and sciences to Russia. She becomes convinced she can change Russia for the better by influencing Peter. Archie discourages Peter's pursuit of learning and threatens Catherine, who threatens him in return. Orlo becomes lost in the woods and encounters Russian and Swedish soldiers. Archie puts a raven in Peter's room to scare him, angering Peter. Catherine asks Peter to reinstate Marial as a lady of the court. Peter refuses, revealing the reason for her demotion: as part of an ill-advised joke, her father committed necrophilia with Peter's mother's corpse. Instead, Catherine gives her back her dog, Bilini, and Peter promptly uses it for a test of a parachute. Catherine celebrates this demonstration of science with hope for the future.
7	7	"A Pox on Hope"	Colin Bucksey	Tony McNamara and Gretel Vella	May 15, 2020
Thanks to Catherine, the Russian court is excitedly absorbing culture. Catherine believes she can change Russia by influencing Peter instead of killing him, and gives him a printing press. Despite Archie's opposition, Peter likes the press's ability to print cartoons and allows it to stay. To thank Catherine, he performs cunnilingus on her and she reaches orgasm, which troubles her as she is in love with Leo. Peter brags to Leo about the encounter, and a jealous Leo gets drunk and distributes cartoons depicting Catherine having sex with a horse. Georgina feels that she is losing Peter's favor. Marial is about to have sex with the servant Vlad when she discovers evidence of smallpox on his back. She and Catherine attempt to help him, but Dr. Chekov is indifferent and plans to burn Vlad and other serfs who have been affected by an outbreak. Catherine pushes for inoculation, but the court and Peter are against her. Peter is furious when she inoculates herself before the entire court to convince them of its efficacy. He bans the practice and locks her away until it is certain that she has not been infected. Catherine emerges from her apartments and witnesses, from a distance, the serfs being burned.
8	8	"Meatballs at the Dacha"	Colin Bucksey	Teleplay by : Tony McNamara; Story by : Amelia Roper and Tony McNamara	May 15, 2020
Catherine and Peter travel to meet the King and Queen of Sweden for peace talks. Peter tries to make amends with Catherine by giving her a large diamond, but she remains angry with him over the deaths of the serfs, including Vlad. En route to Sweden, Catherine tries to get Velementov to join the coup, but he is only interested in seducing her. Peter and Catherine share a moment of closeness before the peace talks begin. Peter initially gets on well with the Swedish king, Hugo, finding him a kindred spirit, but becomes enraged when Hugo demands the return of St. Petersburg. Catherine steps in, claiming to have heard the Emperor talking in his sleep, and presents an acceptable compromise. Troubled by the distance between himself and Catherine, Leo prepares to return home, but is stopped by Marial who reveals Catherine's plans to him. Catherine and Peter return to Moscow in triumph. Peter thanks Catherine for helping him, revealing he knows he doesn't talk in his sleep. Catherine and Leo are reunited and he enthusiastically joins the coup.
9	9	"Love Hurts"	Geeta Patel	Tony McNamara	May 15, 2020
Orlo, Marial, Velementov, and Leo set out to bring more aristocrats to Catherine's side, with mixed results. Velementov and Leo are forced to kill Count Gorky after he refuses to join the coup. Elizabeth's suspicions are aroused, as Gorky had been Peter the Great's best friend. Peter becomes convinced there is a threat to his life and surrounds Catherine and himself with guards everywhere they go. The entire court, apart from Elizabeth, Georgina, and Grigor, are subjected to torture. Catherine, determined to show the court that she is not in league with Peter, undergoes torture herself. She and the other conspirators succeed in keeping the coup a secret. Grigor confronts Peter and admits he resents Peter's affair with Georgina. Peter agrees to end the relationship and reveals he's fallen in love with Catherine. Rostov, who was forced to shave his beard and lost the love of his wife as a result, returns only to face ridicule from Peter and Grigor. After a tryst with Marial, who is desperate to become a noble again, Rostov breaks into the room where Peter is hiding with Catherine, intending to kill him. Peter, Grigor, and Georgina fight Rostov off and kill him. At a dinner with the Russian court, who are all recovering from a day of torture, Catherine gives a passionate speech that unites them in devotion to her. Afterwards, Peter tells Catherine he loves her. She returns to her apartments and discovers she is pregnant.
10	10	"The Beaver's Nose"	Geeta Patel	Tony McNamara	May 15, 2020
Shocked at the revelation that she is pregnant by Peter, Catherine wakes on her 21st birthday determined to enact the coup. Peter prepares a special cake and other gifts for her, then plans to kill Leo, believing this will cause her to transfer her affection to him. Catherine sends Velementov to gather the military leaders to support her and sends Orlo to kill Archie, while promising Marial that Archie will not be harmed. Leo goes hunting with Grigor and Peter and they attempt to kill him, but are unsuccessful. Catherine prepares to kill her husband during a birthday lunch, but is halted when he reveals her gift: the philosopher Voltaire, whom Catherine idolizes. She finds herself unable to kill Peter in front of Voltaire. Peter claims that Leo has abandoned her, but Catherine realizes her lover is either dead or in danger and attacks Peter, who believes her assault to have arisen out of passion for him and locks her in the room. Orlo fails to kill Archie and is injured. Marial, frustrated that Catherine has not killed Peter, becomes convinced the coup will fail and discovers Orlo attacking Archie. Furious that she's been betrayed, she is persuaded by Archie to reveal Catherine's betrayal to Peter. In exchange for becoming a lady again, Marial shows Peter Catherine's plans for overthrowing him and reveals that she's pregnant. Heartbroken, Peter confronts Catherine, who suggests he abdicate. He shows her that Leo is his prisoner and threatens to kill him unless she calls off the coup. Catherine goes to Velementov to stop the uprising, determined to save Leo, but he tells her she has filled Russia with hope for a new future, which is more important. Catherine goes to see Leo and explains what has happened. He expresses regret but understands her choice. Catherine kisses him goodbye, then signals Velementov, who fires his pistol to restart the coup.

=== Season 2 (2021) ===
No. overall	No. in season	Title	Directed by	Written by	Original release date
11	1	"Heads, It's Me"	Colin Bucksey	Tony McNamara	November 19, 2021
It has been four months since the coup began. Leo is presumed dead, but Catherine continues to hope he is alive as his body has not been found. A standoff has occurred in the palace with Catherine's forces in one wing and Peter's in another. Catherine attempts to smoke out Peter using Molotov cocktails, but Peter, Grigor, and Georgina flee to his country villa. Starving and without provisions, Peter sends for his chef, Jean-Pierre, and Catherine's troops follow and surround the villa. A stalemate ensues, broken only when Catherine has Jean-Pierre prepare a feast to torment Peter. He surrenders and agrees to transfer power to Catherine, asking only that he be placed under house arrest and have a meal with Catherine and their unborn child every day. After his abdication is signed, he gives Catherine a bag containing Leo's severed head. Later, Peter reveals to Grigor and Georgina that he has a plan to retake the country.
12	2	"Dickhead"	Colin Bucksey	Tony McNamara	November 19, 2021
Catherine brings Peter, Grigor, and Georgina back to the palace. She reconciles with Marial, promoting her back to her status as a noblewoman, and strikes a bargain with Archie, who has given instructions to turn religious Russians against her if he is killed. She launches her long-awaited girls' school, met with resistance from Lady Svenska and the court ladies. Prior to her coronation, Catherine meets the nobles of her empire, many of whom disrespect her and repeat the rumour that she had sex with a horse. One, Tarzinsky, threatens Catherine with violence but is cowed by Archie's presence. The only visitor who positively interacts with Catherine is Father Basil, a country priest and Leo's cousin, who gives her Leo's letters. Catherine is crowned and begins her rule. Her first decree proclaims religious freedom in Russia, provoking Archie's ire, and she begins to groom Father Basil as Archie's replacement. Peter plans to wait for Catherine to fail and make her fall in love with him. Grigor and Arkady plot against Catherine. On Aunt Elizabeth's advice, Peter asks Catherine what she would change about him and agrees to curb his propensity for violence. He subsequently becomes enraged at Tarzinsky for calling him a "dickhead" and stabs him to death in the palace courtyard.
13	3	"Alone at Last"	Zetna Fuentes	Tony McNamara	November 19, 2021
Catherine awakes from a nightmare about Leo. She punishes Peter for killing Tarzinsky by locking him in his rooms, despite his pleas to go truffle hunting with his new dog, an activity he remembers bonding with his father over in childhood. Desperate to leave Russia, Georgina convinces Catherine to exile her and Grigor to France. Trying to avoid dreaming about Leo, Catherine takes drugs to stay awake and, in a manic state, appoints Father Basil Archbishop of Russia. Pressured by his intimidating uncle Vanya, Orlo takes advantage of Catherine's intoxication to convince her to build a road in his impoverished home state. To further punish Peter, Catherine has the mummified body of his dead mother brought into his room, keeping him locked inside. Recalling her harsh treatment of him as a child, he breaks her glass coffin and accidentally destroys her corpse. After a confrontation with Catherine where he angers her by casually mentioning Leo's death, Peter escapes to the woods to go truffle hunting. He is caught by Velementov, who reminds Peter that he, not Peter's father, took him truffle hunting as a child. Peter begins to come to terms with his parents' neglect and abuse. Catherine takes Peter's dog into the woods, determined to find and destroy the first truffle of the season to spite him, and accidentally comes across the clearing where she said goodbye to Leo. Consoled by Marial and Elizabeth, she allows herself to admit that she could not have saved him. Grigor, feeling that Peter needs him, stops the carriage en route to Paris and returns to the palace without Georgina.
14	4	"The Devil's Lunch"	Zetna Fuentes	Tami Sagher	November 19, 2021
Velementov insists that Russia should go to war with the Ottoman Empire, but Catherine is reluctant to start a war over nothing. Sundak, an Ottoman ambassador and an old friend of Peter's, comes to meet Catherine, who has a dim view of the Ottomans' misogynistic culture. She arranges the room to imply she has an all-female council of close advisors, but he is unruffled by the implied insult. Velementov begins an affair with Lady Svenska, who is secretly spying for Peter, and lets slip that war with the Ottomans is a possibility. Catherine and Peter each try to win Sundak to their respective causes, which is complicated by Peter's jealousy of Catherine's interest in the handsome Sundak. Meanwhile, Archie attempts unsuccessfully to ingratiate himself with Catherine on Marial's advice, and Marial begins an affair with a depressed Grigor. Peter attempts to undermine Catherine and Sundak's relationship by throwing a raucous party, but Catherine outwits him by taking over the party and impressing Sundak on a hunting trip the next day. Sundak leaves after a peace agreement has been reached, but Arkady and Tatyana, on orders from Peter, intercept Sundak's carriage and assassinate him. Catherine cuts short a tryst with a guard when she discovers lice in his beard, and relents when Elizabeth suggests taking advantage of Peter's skills in cunnilingus.
15	5	"Animal Instincts"	Matthew Moore	Tony McNamara	November 19, 2021
Catherine regrets her sexual encounter with Peter, but he is thrilled that she shows signs of returning his affection, to Elizabeth's delight and Grigor's frustration. Elizabeth counsels him to make himself a mystery to Catherine, and he successfully intrigues her by playing hard to get. The court is thrown into alarm when a crocodile mysteriously begins roaming the palace and attacks Elizabeth, wounding her leg and eating her pet mouse. Catherine dismisses the superstitious nobles who believe it to be a demon or a supernatural omen, but becomes frustrated when Father Basil tells the court that the creature may indeed be a sign from God. Archie announces that as Patriarch, only he can discover the meaning of the "omen", and Catherine realizes that he has planted the creature himself. He threatens to proclaim that the crocodile is a sign that God condemns her reign unless she agrees to revoke religious freedom and remove Father Basil from power. Catherine asks Peter, an excellent hunter, to search the Palace for the animal with her, but he ignores an opportunity to kill it, in order to spend more time with her. Catherine agrees to Archie's demand, and he takes her to "meet God" through the use of psychedelic mushrooms. Although the two see different visions, they recognize their mutual hope for a better Russia. Meanwhile, Marial encounters an elderly serf, "Shakey", who she shared rooms with during her time as a servant. Learning that Shakey has been declared too old to work, Marial takes her on as a maid. Catherine captures the crocodile using opium-laced mice, but when she presents the captured animal to the court, the nobles panic when it starts to wake up and stab it to death. That evening, she agrees to dance with Peter, sharing a romantic moment with him that she abruptly stops, uncomfortable with her growing interest in him.
16	6	"A Simple Jape"	Matthew Moore	Tony McNamara & Gretel Vella	November 19, 2021
In the middle of a tryst, Peter and Catherine argue when he accuses her of using him for sex and she refuses to say that she loves him. After being confronted by pupils at her girls' school who think she is not changing the system quickly enough, Catherine resolves to free all serfs. Orlo cautions patience, but the impatient Catherine decides to play a "jape" on the court to prove her point. She disguises Shakey as a member of the aristocracy at a party, and introduces her as "Lady Anastasia". Lady Svenska is fooled and charmed by the old woman, but horrified when Catherine announces Shakey's true identity. Father Basil takes his leave of Archie, condemning his political gamesmanship in a passionate speech. Archie suddenly kisses Basil, an act that leaves him shaken and confused. Grigor forces Orlo to give him Catherine's plans for liberating serfs, and uses them to turn the nobles against Catherine. This goads Catherine into proclaiming immediate freedom for the serfs, and Peter takes advantage of the situation to urge the nobles to call for Catherine's abdication. He plans to escape his rooms with the help of a body double, Pugachev, and take Catherine hostage. The palace serfs rebel against the nobles, and in the resulting chaos, Marial discovers that Lady Svenska has murdered Shakey. Catherine's advisors call on her to put an end to the violence, but she cannot bring herself to fire on her own people and orders them out of the room. Peter bursts into Catherine's office with a gun, but when he finds her weeping alone at her failure, he comforts her and willingly returns to his captivity. Catherine reluctantly orders Velementov to subdue the rebellion. After the violence is over, Marial shoots Svenska in the head, in revenge for Shakey's murder.
17	7	"Stapler"	Ally Pankiw	Tony McNamara	November 19, 2021
Catherine hosts a science contest for new inventions. Marial hopes this will snap her out of her negative existential mood. Peter decides that he does not wish to be Emperor and plans to support Catherine, enraging and confusing Grigor. Peter offers to help Catherine with the science contest by attempting to create an invention to enter. Peter and his followers kidnap a scientist en route and steal his invention, a cold box. Catherine feels disillusioned with her supporters and team when they abandoned her side during the serf rebellion. Archie struggles over his recent kiss with Basil and confesses these feelings to Marial. Grigor conspires to force Catherine to abdicate to Peter. Catherine's mother, Princess Joanna, arrives to visit. While excited, Catherine feels belittled by the updates on her siblings' successful marriages and faces disapproval from her mother for her coup and keeping Peter alive. Joanna continues to disapprove and accurately read and dress down the members of court for attempting to take advantage of Catherine's naive optimism. Orlo steals money from the treasury to support his family in their home region. Aunt Elizabeth warns Peter that he must gain Joanna's approval, but he dismisses her concerns. Catherine immediately susses out that Peter has kidnapped the scientist from Norway but goes along with the plan to win the science contest. Joanna is fascinated and horrified by Peter when they meet but then lightly seduces him and informs Catherine she is aware the cold box/fridge is missing. A serf approaches Catherine with a new idea for an invention for the science contest, a rollercoaster, which Joanna disapproves of.
18	8	"Seven Days"	Ally Pankiw	Tony McNamara	November 19, 2021
Joanna has an allergic reaction to peanuts brought from the Americas, causing Catherine to feel immense guilt. Joanna gives Catherine a list of individuals she feels should be killed for Catherine to succeed, including Aunt Elizabeth and Marial. Later, Joanna tries to seduce Peter, arguing that it is not cheating as they are family and would simply be making each other happy. Elizabeth again warns Peter not to have sex with Joanna. After a medical exam, Elizabeth pronounces that Catherine's baby will be born in 7 days. The court begins preparations involving rituals for Peter and Catherine. Because of this, Catherine tries to run the country while on forced bed rest. Peter is taken into the woods to dig graves for his wife and child ceremoniously should they die in childbirth. Catherine is inspired by hearing from the noble ladies to change laws regarding women when the Ottoman Empire sends word they are open to diplomatic talks, which turns out to be an assassination attempt. Joanna tries to seduce Peter again, and her long game is revealed: she wants Peter to take power again to reinstate her plan for another daughter to marry the French monarch, while Catherine would simply continue as queen consort and raise the baby as heir to Russia. Catherine is disillusioned with her mother. Joanna finally seduces Peter as he gives in to her advances; during their sexual encounter, Joanna falls out of the window and dies. Elizabeth, Peter and Marial hide the body and make it appear that she left suddenly. Peter and Catherine reconcile and Peter hides Joanna's death from Catherine as she goes into labor.
19	9	"Walnut Season"	Colin Bucksey	Tony McNamara & Gretel Vella	November 19, 2021
Catherine gives birth to her son Paul. 6 weeks later, Peter is avoiding Catherine and Russia has gone to war with the Ottoman Empire. King Hugo of Sweden and his wife arrive after being run out of Sweden as democracy takes hold. Grigor's wife returns to court and tries to ingratiate herself with Catherine and win Grigor back. Marial's father dies, leaving her future in jeopardy as her nephew Maxim arrives to claim the family inheritance. King Hugo attempts to convince Catherine to lend him the Russian army to retake Sweden, but she is preoccupied; King Hugo then develops a plan to overthrow Catherine so that Peter gives him the army. Peter accidentally informs Elizabeth that his mother drowned her son; Elizabeth kidnaps Paul and goes to her country estate. Catherine and Peter travel there to retrieve Paul and Peter continues to avoid telling her the truth about her mother. Archie struggles with his sexual feelings while Marial tries to find a husband. Elizabeth appears to have a psychotic break over her grief for her son, calling Paul by her son's name "Igor". Catherine and Peter convince Elizabeth to return to court with them; Catherine confesses her feelings for Peter and they reconcile. Marial decides to marry her nephew to keep her estate and continues her affair with Grigor. Archie reveals that Orlo stole money from the treasury; Orlo leaves the court in disgrace. Grigor accidentally confesses to Marial about Peter's part in Joanna's death.
20	10	"Wedding"	Colin Bucksey	Tony McNamara & Fiona Seres	November 19, 2021
Marial plans her wedding as the Ottomans agree to meet Catherine. Despite Grigor's pleading, Marial tells Catherine that Peter had sex with and then accidentally killed her mother. Devastated, Catherine goes to the front to meet with the Ottomans. She expresses her anger at Elizabeth for keeping Peter's secrets and Velamentov for pushing for war (Russo-Turkish War (1768–1774)). Grigor realizes that Catherine now knows what happened to Joanna and warns Peter, who plans to flee with Paul, but finds he cannot take his son from his mother. Catherine and Peter each ruminate on their present predicament - to kill the other and have the throne for themselves or forgive each other. Catherine meets with the Sultan Mustafa III and attempts to reason with him, but he responds by stabbing her in the hand. She in turn kills him, then flees with Elizabeth. Peter's supporters try to stage another coup, meanwhile Catherine's supporters argue about the best path forward. Archie ultimately decides to support Catherine as he believes she will help Russia prosper. At Marial and Maxim's wedding, Catherine confronts Peter, but then appears to forgive him and tells him to meet her in his rooms. Later, Velementov arrives at the wedding and arrests several nobles on Catherine's orders, including Marial, Grigor, and others, but not Georgina. Catherine enters Peter's apartments and stabs Peter, then sobs over his body, before realizing when Peter enters that she has stabbed his double, Pugachev. Catherine embraces Peter, relieved, and they uneasily look at each other.

=== Season 3 (2023) ===
No. overall	No. in season	Title	Directed by	Written by	Original release date
21	1	"The Bullet or the Bear"	Matthew Moore	Tony McNamara	May 12, 2023
Peter and Catherine deal with the fallout from the previous night- Catherine is racked with guilt over stabbing Pugachev. In contrast, Peter deals with balancing his love for Catherine with his desire to continue doing whatever he wants. Orlo is furious that Peter is still alive, and disavows Catherine. Catherine is determined to play the game of politics better, enlisting Elizabeth and Archie to tutor her, and agreeing to follow their lead in schemes. Peter helps his friends escape their death sentences, but feeling torn, returns them to the palace. Georgina worries about her position and why she was not captured, and declares her loyalty to Catherine. To test this, following Archie and Elizabeth's lead, Catherine orders her to be the first one to fire a shot at the prisoners. Georgina shoots Tatyana, shocking the court. Catherine brokers deals with all the prisoners, allowing them to return to court while pledging their loyalty to her. Catherine tells Marial that they are no longer friends after her betrayal, her betrayal being that she had the choice to tell her about Catherine’s mother straight away or not at all, but chose to wait when it was convenient for her. While in the woods, Catherine unknowingly shoots and kills Orlo. The bears from the abandoned execution, let loose in the woods, then eat Orlo's body.
22	2	"Choose Your Weapon"	Matthew Moore	Tony McNamara	May 12, 2023
The British ambassador to Russia offers Menorca to Catherine in exchange for 10,000 troops to fight the Americans in North America. Meanwhile, the new American ambassador charms Catherine with his talk of democracy, driving Peter to outbursts of jealousy. Marial is distressed that she and Catherine are no longer friends, but attempts to reconcile. Maxim, Marial's child husband, is upset that Grigor and Marial are flaunting their affair in public, and challenges Grigor to a duel. To avoid confrontation with Maxim, Grigor chooses a second, a boy the same age as Maxim. Maxim shoots and kills the boy, winning the duel. Hugo is upset that Catherine may side with the Americans while Agnes plots to enlist General Velementov to help them retake Sweden. Catherine agrees to the British ambassador's request but secretly plots to delay sending the troops long enough for it to not matter in the war, thereby supporting the Americans without angering the British. Catherine and the American ambassador have sex on her desk and she later tells Peter about it. Peter fights the American ambassador, but ultimately lets the matter go.
23	3	"You The People"	Sheree Folkson	Tony McNamara	May 12, 2023
Catherine organizes a conference called the Nakaz to hear the voices of the Russian people. She aims to outlaw murder, but faces resistance from nobles, merchants, and scared peasants. Peter plans to kill Simitz, a former courtier who sexually assaulted him, Grigor and Georgina as children. At the Nakaz, support for Catherine is shaky. Catherine confronts Simitz and appeals to Peter's better nature; he spares Simitz's life but warns him to stay away. Elizabeth poisons a rich merchant and manipulates him into supporting Catherine out of fear; Archie convinces the peasants to side with Catherine through religious intimidation. Marial's servant leads her to Pugachev, who is wounded. Peter, still struggling with his violent tendencies, rejects Georgina's advances and remains faithful to Catherine. Catherine realizes that Archie and Elizabeth's methods are not aligned with her vision of leadership. Velementov starts spitting blood and realises he is dying; Catherine tells him to meet Dr. Vinodel and gives his position as head of the army to Petrov. Peter and Grigor kill Simitz, and Catherine decides not to take any action.
24	4	"Stag"	Sheree Folkson	Tony McNamara & Fiona Seres	May 12, 2023
In this episode, Peter plans to participate in a ritual where he must shoot a stag without harming baby Paul, who will be tied to the animal. Catherine cancels the stag ritual and Paul's ordination when she learns his first word is "pussy", fearing he will become like Peter. This decision jeopardizes the legitimacy of the Russian throne, which relies on hereditary succession. Catherine and Peter seek marriage counseling and attempt to work through their conflicts. Meanwhile, Agnes continues to influence Velementov, while Georgina discusses ideas for Russia's future with Katya. Marial implores Catherine not to give in to the ordination; Catherine bonds with Marial and they become friends again. She is later thrilled to hear that Paul's second word is "books". Eventually, Catherine sticks to her decision not to ordain Paul but allows the Stag ceremony. Peter is given a sedative by Elizabeth to be given to Catherine so that they can proceed with the ordination secretly, but Peter can't go through with it due to his concerns for Paul's safety. The stag ritual takes place, and Archie informs Pugachev that he must act against the empress at God's command.
25	5	"Sweden"	Jaffar Mahmood	Tony McNamara & Ava Pickett	May 12, 2023
Pugachev, under Archie's guidance, incites crowds against Catherine, pretending to be Peter. They burn down towns and disrespect Catherine by destroying dolls of her. Marial confronts Archie about his involvement, and he reveals his plan to make Catherine desperate and then save her from Pugachev to regain her favor and prioritize the church. Catherine and Elizabeth suspect Pugachev has a mystery employer behind his rebellion and enlist Velementov to stop him. Agnes takes advantage of the situation to lure Velementov away, delaying his plan. Hugo manipulates Peter's insecurities and urges him to become a military leader to impress his father's ghost. Peter proposes taking back Sweden with Velementov's help to prove himself, and he steals Catherine's army for the invasion without her knowledge. Grigor, who is opposed to the idea, is left behind.
26	6	"Ice"	Jaffar Mahmood	Tony McNamara	May 12, 2023
Peter, Hugo and Velementov ride to meet the troops that will take back Sweden. Catherine and Grigor catch up with the trio and Peter crosses a frozen lake on horseback to speak to Catherine. She demands he give up his plan; they both declare their love for one another, but Peter rides back to his friends regardless. The ice cracks and Peter and his horse fall to their deaths. Hugo persuades Velementov to continue with the invasion plan since he is going to die anyway. Back at the palace, Archie and Pugachev discuss strategy and Archie is strongly attracted to Pugachev. Elizabeth figures out Archie's plan but allows it. Marial worries about the situation and decides to kill Pugachev. Catherine and Grigor return to the palace in denial and grief respectively. Catherine holds a joyful breakfast and announces that Peter is away invading Sweden. She wants to conceal Peter's death from the nobles while Grigor wants to tell the truth. At Archie's instruction, Pugachev sends a letter, claiming he's ready to surrender. Catherine is pleased and intends on killing him when he arrives. Georgina learns about Peter's death from Grigor and though shocked, keeps it a secret from others.
27	7	"Fun"	Matthew Moore	Tony McNamara	May 12, 2023
Georgina convinces Catherine to hold a festival to make the goal of enlightenment more appealing to the people. Petrov informs Catherine about Pugachev's whereabouts, and Archie and Petrov argue over whether to negotiate or kill him. Marial and Maxim decide to kill Pugachev at one of his gatherings. Moved by his speech, Marial decides not to kill him, so Maxim shoots him. He quickly departs, believing he's killed Pugachev, but Pugachev regains consciousness with a bullet wound in his right shoulder. Catherine, in denial and suppressing her grief, behaves erratically. Elizabeth starts feeling cold and grows colder throughout the day, and decides to meditate and find out what happened. Georgina convinces Katya to stage her treasonous play lampooning Catherine at the festival, which leads to Katya's banishment to Siberia. Afterward, Georgina spreads a rumor about Peter's death. Catherine is reassured when Maxim claims to have killed Pugachev, telling herself and the court that Pugachev is the one who died and not Peter. Elizabeth realizes that the real Peter is dead during her meditation. When Grigor is not able to hold it together anymore and informs the court, Catherine finally accepts the truth, leading to her emotional breakdown.
28	8	"Peter and the Wolf"	Matthew Moore	Tony McNamara & Ava Pickett	May 12, 2023
Elizabeth and Petrov attempt to retrieve Peter's body from the lake. As they wait for the ice to melt, Elizabeth shares her pain and grief with Petrov. She has a spiritual encounter with a wolf, believing it to be Peter's spirit, and bids him farewell. Velementov plans an invasion of Sweden, but Hugo wants to establish a new nation without violence. Elizabeth and Petrov find Velementov and Hugo and make them return to Russia with the army. Back at the palace, a still-grieving Catherine, wearing Peter's clothes, introduces divorce through the Nakaz, but faces unintended consequences and struggles with guilt over her words to Peter. Marial confronts Catherine about shutting down the divorce office; Catherine finally reopens it with stricter rules and new regulations. Maxim informs Catherine that Pugachev is still alive and rallying supporters. Catherine picks up Paul for the first time since Peter's death, and Grigor deals with his grief by hunting with Maxim and Arkady. Marial tries to win Grigor back and asks him to divorce Georgina, but he seeks comfort from Catherine over their shared grief. Catherine asks Grigor for a favor, and he agrees. The next day, Grigor takes Paul to the forest to keep him safe, while Catherine handles guns in her room.
29	9	"Destiny"	Tricia Brock	Tony McNamara & Fiona Seres	May 12, 2023
A still-grieving Catherine starts playing a dangerous version of Russian Roulette everyday, reflecting on her destiny to rule. Her attempts to stop Pugachev are unsuccessful as his loyal supporters protect him. Elizabeth talks to Catherine about Paul’s ordainment, but Catherine is keeping Paul hidden and safe, worried about his future. Marial and Georgina both try to win back Grigor's affections, but he remains indifferent. Tatyana and Arkady join Pugachev; Arkady knows it’s not really Peter, but Tatyana starts convincing herself otherwise. Velementov learns his disease is curable from Dr. Vinodel and regrets his treason. Agnes and Hugo offer their services to Russia through Elizabeth and she asks them to search for Paul, who is hidden by Grigor. Petrov and Velementov propose separate plans to capture Pugachev. Catherine accepts Velementov's plan, but continues with Petrov as head of the army. After talking with Marial, Catherine attends one of Pugachev's rallies for herself to understand his influence over the people. Meanwhile, Archie has a secret plan in motion to negotiate the surrender of Pugachev.
30	10	"Once Upon a Time"	Tricia Brock	Tony McNamara	May 12, 2023
Pugachev is captured and interrogated by Catherine, after which Archie manipulates Maxim to shoot him dead without Catherine's knowledge. The royal astronomer, Nikolai Shostakich, informs Catherine that a comet which only comes once in 75 years will pass through Russia in the next few days. Petrov brings Catherine Pugachev's body and the rebellion starts getting out of hand. Elizabeth encourages Catherine to take control of the situation, otherwise Elizabeth may be tempted to step in and take the monarchy. While playing Russian Roulette, an intruder tries to kill Catherine, and she uses the gun to shoot him instead; this epiphany allows her to come out of her daze and grief. Georgina, after talking to Hugo, steals Paul from Grigor and has him ordained by Archie. She plans to marry Paul to gain power, only to be interrupted by Grigor who rescues Paul and chooses Marial over Georgina; however Marial is conflicted over her loyalties. Marial ultimately chooses Catherine over Archie and gives her the letters between Pugachev and Archie. Catherine devises a plan with Marial's help and enlists Archie, Maxim, Marial, Petrov and Velementov to spread different rumors about Peter and Pugachev's deaths and her own identity, attack Pugachev's base and win back the people by telling them that the comet is a sign from God. This allows her to manage any story she needs at any time and take control of the situation. Elizabeth, impressed with Catherine's idea, stands down. Catherine deals with Archie's betrayal by ordering him buried alive and then to cut off his head, but later, Marial manages to revive Archie. In the end, Catherine sports a new haircut and performs a celebratory dance with a newfound confidence, while the comet passes over Russia.

== Production ==
=== Development ===
The series is based upon Tony McNamara's play revolving around Catherine the Great, which premiered at the Sydney Theatre Company in 2008. McNamara also wrote a film adaption of the play, "It had been a play and a film, and I was always struggling with the fact it was such a massive story for a film. I wanted to tell it as a story that goes for years and years." The series was initially pitched as having six seasons, having planned to introduce key historical figures in Catherine's life as the series continued.

On August 24, 2018, it was announced that Hulu was close to giving a pilot order to a miniseries about Catherine the Great. The series was written by Tony McNamara who also served as an executive producer alongside Elle Fanning and Marian Macgowan. Production companies involved with the pilot consist of Media Rights Capital, Echo Lake Entertainment, and Thruline Entertainment. On November 20, 2018, it was reported that Matt Shakman was directing the pilot. On February 11, 2019, it was announced during the Television Critics Association's annual winter press tour that Hulu had given the production a series order. On July 2, 2020, Hulu renewed the series for a second season. On January 11, 2022, Hulu renewed the series for a 10-episode third season; in August 2023, Hulu announced the third season had been its last.

=== Casting ===
Alongside the initial pilot announcement, it was confirmed that Elle Fanning and Nicholas Hoult had been cast in the pilot's lead roles as Catherine the Great and her husband Peter III of Russia, respectively. In November 2018, it was announced that Phoebe Fox, Sacha Dhawan, Charity Wakefield, and Gwilym Lee had joined the cast of the pilot. In January 2020, Sebastian De Souza, Adam Godley, and Douglas Hodge were added to the cast. On May 14, 2021, Gillian Anderson was cast in a guest starring role as Johanna, Catherine's mother.

=== Filming ===
Principal photography for the pilot episode had commenced by November 2018 in York, England with other filming locations expected to include Leicestershire, Lincolnshire and Hever in Kent. The main filming locations were Hatfield House in Hertfordshire, Belvoir Castle in Leicestershire and the Royal Palace of Caserta in southern Italy. The loggia on the lake at Hever Castle doubled as the location for a Russo-Swedish peace conference. St Clere Estate near Sevenoaks in Kent was used to stage battle scenes, palace gardens, hunting scenes, carriage routes, the Swedish border, the war-torn Russian village and the frozen lake among other scenes. Filming for season two began on November 4, 2020 and ended on July 17, 2021; another location used was Hampton Court Palace. Filming for season three began on July 12, 2022 and ended on December 6, 2022.

== Release ==
=== Season 1 ===
The series premiered in the United States on May 15, 2020. In Australia, all episodes were released on Stan on May 16. The series airs on Channel 4 and StarzPlay in the UK. It was released on StarzPlay 18 June 2020 and on Channel 4 on 3 January 2021.

StarzPlay also distribute the series in Ireland, Germany, France, Italy, Spain, Benelux, Latin America and Brazil. More.tv broadcasts the show in Russia, Sky in New Zealand, and Amazon Prime Video in Canada.

=== Season 2 ===
The second season premiered on November 19, 2021 in the US, and on the same day in Canada, for Amazon Prime Video.

In the UK Starzplay premiered the second season on 5 December 2021 and on Channel 4 on 27 July 2022.

=== Season 3 ===
The third season premiered on May 12, 2023, with all 10 episodes on Hulu.

== Historical accuracy ==
Hulu has described The Great as "anti-historical," and each episode's title sequence subtitled the series as an "occasionally true story" until the second season finale, when it changed to "an almost entirely untrue story." According to Los Angeles Times critic Robert Lloyd, "McNamara had jotted down some names, relationships and a few historical bullet points, torn up the paper, and started writing. And so must the viewer abandon himself to what's on the plate without a care to learning anything useful or even true about Russia or any of the real people represented here."

"Aunt" Elizabeth is modeled on Peter the Great's actual daughter, Empress Elizabeth, but this version is Peter's sister-in-law and lover, and has never ruled Russia. While Elizabeth did negotiate the marriage of her nephew Charles Peter Ulrich (later Peter III) to the future Catherine the Great, as portrayed in the series. Count Orlo's name suggests the historical Prince Grigory Orlov, who, as in the series, played a key role in Catherine's coup, had a love of culture and Enlightenment ideals, and promoted smallpox vaccination. In reality, Orlov was a military officer and lover of Catherine's, and his death was due to prolonged illness and not shooting.

== Reception ==
=== Critical response ===
Critical response of The Great
Season	Rotten Tomatoes	Metacritic
1	89% (87 reviews)	74 (33 reviews)
2	100% (34 reviews)	85 (9 reviews)
3	100% (16 reviews)	88 (8 reviews)

==== Season 1 ====
The first season received mostly positive reviews from critics. On Rotten Tomatoes, it holds an approval rating of 89% based on 87 critic reviews, with an average critic rating of 7.50/10. The website's critical consensus reads, "The Great can't quite live up to its namesake, but delicious performances from Elle Fanning and Nicholas Hoult and a wicked sense of humor make it a pretty good watch." On Metacritic, it has a weighted average score of 74 out of 100 based on 33 reviews.

==== Season 2 ====
The second season received critical acclaim. On Metacritic, it has a weighted average score of 85 out of 100 based on 9 reviews. On Rotten Tomatoes, it holds an 100% approval rating based on 34 reviews, with an average critic rating of 8.20/10. The website's critical consensus reads, "The Great continues its revisionist reign stronger than before thanks to its addictive wit and marvelous cast − huzzah!"

==== Season 3 ====
The third season has received critical acclaim. On Metacritic, it has a weighted average score of 88 out of 100 based on 8 reviews. On Rotten Tomatoes, it holds an approval rating of 100% based on 16 reviews, with an average critic rating of 8/10.

=== Awards and nominations ===
==== Season 1 ====
Year	Award	Category	Nominee(s)	Result	Ref.
2020	Primetime Emmy Awards	Outstanding Directing for a Comedy Series	Matt Shakman (for "The Great")	Nominated	
2020	Primetime Emmy Awards	Outstanding Writing for a Comedy Series	Tony McNamara (for "The Great")	Nominated	
2020	TCA Awards	Outstanding New Program	The Great	Nominated	
2020	TCA Awards	Individual Achievement in Comedy	Elle Fanning	Nominated	
2021	American Society of Cinematographers Awards	Outstanding Achievement in Cinematography in Motion Picture, Miniseries or Pilot Made for Television	Anette Haellmigk (for "The Great")	Nominated	
2021	Artios Awards	Television Pilot and First Season – Comedy	Rose Wicksteed	Won	
2021	Australian Academy of Cinema and Television Arts International Awards	Best Comedy Series	The Great	Nominated	
2021	AWGIE Awards	Best Screenplay, Television – Series or Miniseries (More than 4 Hours Duration)	Tony McNamara (for "The Beaver's Nose")	Won	
2021	AWGIE Awards	Best Screenplay, Television – Series or Miniseries (More than 4 Hours Duration)	Tony McNamara and Gretel Vella (for "A Pox on Hope")	Nominated	
2021	British Academy Television Craft Awards	Best Make-Up & Hair Design	Louise Coles, Sarah Nuth, Lorraine Glynn and Erin Ayanian	Nominated	
2021	Critics' Choice Television Awards	Best Actor in a Comedy Series	Nicholas Hoult	Nominated	
2021	Golden Globe Awards	Best Television Series – Musical or Comedy	The Great	Nominated	
2021	Golden Globe Awards	Best Actor in a Television Series – Musical or Comedy	Nicholas Hoult	Nominated	
2021	Golden Globe Awards	Best Actress in a Television Series – Musical or Comedy	Elle Fanning	Nominated	
2021	Gotham Independent Film Awards	Breakthrough Series – Long Form	Tony McNamara, Marian Macgowan, Mark Winemaker, Elle Fanning, Brittany Kahan Ward, Doug Mankoff, Andrew Spaulding, Josh Kesselman, Ron West and Matt Shakman	Nominated	
2021	Independent Spirit Awards	Best Female Performance in a New Scripted Series	Elle Fanning	Nominated	
2021	MTV Movie & TV Awards	Best Villain	Nicholas Hoult	Nominated	
2021	Satellite Awards	Best Actor in a Musical or Comedy Series	Nicholas Hoult	Nominated	
2021	Satellite Awards	Best Actress in a Musical or Comedy Series	Elle Fanning	Won	
2021	Screen Actors Guild Awards	Outstanding Performance by an Ensemble in a Comedy Series	Belinda Bromilow, Sebastian de Souza, Sacha Dhawan, Elle Fanning, Phoebe Fox, Bayo Gbadamosi, Adam Godley, Douglas Hodge, Nicholas Hoult, Louis Hynes, Florence Keith-Roach, Gwilym Lee, Danusia Samal and Charity Wakefield	Nominated	
2021	Screen Actors Guild Awards	Outstanding Performance by a Male Actor in a Comedy Series	Nicholas Hoult	Nominated	
2021	Writers Guild of America Awards	Comedy Series	Vanessa Alexander, Tony McNamara, Tess Morris, Amelia Roper, Gretel Vella and James Wood	Nominated	
2021	Writers Guild of America Awards	New Series	Vanessa Alexander, Tony McNamara, Tess Morris, Amelia Roper, Gretel Vella and James Wood	Nominated	
2021	Writers Guild of America Awards	Episodic Comedy	Tony McNamara (for "The Great")	Won	

==== Season 2 ====
Year	Award	Category	Nominee(s)	Result	Ref.
2022	Art Directors Guild Awards	Excellence in Production Design for a One-Hour Period or Fantasy Single-Camera Series	Francesca di Mottola (for "Dickhead", "Seven Days", "Wedding")	Nominated	
2022	Costume Designers Guild Awards	Excellence in Period Television	Sharon Long (for "Seven Days")	Won	
2022	Critics' Choice Television Awards	Best Comedy Series	The Great	Nominated	
2022	Critics' Choice Television Awards	Best Actor in a Comedy Series	Nicholas Hoult	Nominated	
2022	Critics' Choice Television Awards	Best Actress in a Comedy Series	Elle Fanning	Nominated	
2022	Golden Globe Awards	Best Television Series – Musical or Comedy	The Great	Nominated	
2022	Golden Globe Awards	Best Actor in a Television Series – Musical or Comedy	Nicholas Hoult	Nominated	
2022	Golden Globe Awards	Best Actress in a Television Series – Musical or Comedy	Elle Fanning	Nominated	
2022	Hollywood Critics Association TV Awards	Best Actor in a Streaming Series, Comedy	Nicholas Hoult	Nominated	
2022	Hollywood Critics Association TV Awards	Best Actress in a Streaming Series, Comedy	Elle Fanning	Nominated	
2022	Primetime Emmy Awards	Outstanding Lead Actor in a Comedy Series	Nicholas Hoult	Nominated	
2022	Primetime Emmy Awards	Outstanding Lead Actress in a Comedy Series	Elle Fanning	Nominated	
2022	Primetime Creative Arts Emmy Awards	Outstanding Period Costumes	Sharon Long, Viveene Campbell, Anna Cavalerie, and Bobbie Edwards (for "Seven Days")	Won	
2022	Primetime Creative Arts Emmy Awards	Outstanding Production Design for a Narrative Period or Fantasy Program (One Hour or More)	Francesca di Mottola, Emma Painter, and Monica Alberte (for "Wedding")	Nominated	
2022	Screen Actors Guild Awards	Outstanding Performance by an Ensemble in a Comedy Series	Julian Barratt, Belinda Bromilow, Sacha Dhawan, Elle Fanning, Phoebe Fox, Bayo Gbadamosi, Adam Godley, Douglas Hodge, Nicholas Hoult, Florence Keith-Roach, Gwilym Lee, and Charity Wakefield	Nominated	
2022	Screen Actors Guild Awards	Outstanding Performance by a Female Actor in a Comedy Series	Elle Fanning	Nominated	
2022	Set Decorators Society of America Awards	Best Achievement in Décor/Design of a One Hour Period Series	Monica Alberte and Francesca Di Mottola	Nominated	
2022	Writers Guild of America Awards	Episodic Comedy	Tony McNamara (for "Alone at Last")	Won	

==== Season 3 ====
Year	Award	Category	Nominee(s)	Result	Ref.
2023	Golden Trailer Awards	Best Comedy for a TV/Streaming Series (Trailer/Teaser/TV Spot)	The Great (Silk Factory)	Nominated	
2023	Golden Trailer Awards	Most Original TV Spot/Trailer/Teaser for a Series	The Great (Silk Factory)	Nominated	
2023	Hollywood Critics Association TV Awards	Best Actor in a Streaming Series, Comedy	Nicholas Hoult	Nominated	
2023	Hollywood Critics Association TV Awards	Best Writing in a Streaming Series, Comedy	Tony McNamara (for "Choose Your Weapon")	Nominated	
2023	Primetime Creative Arts Emmy Awards	Outstanding Period Costumes	Sharon Long, Claire Tremlett, Basia Kuznar, Anna Lau (for "Choose Your Weapon")	Won	
2024	Art Directors Guild Awards	Excellence in Production Design for a One-Hour Period Single-Camera Series	Francesca di Mottola (for "You the People", "Fun", "Peter and the Wolf")	Won	
2024	AWGIE Awards	Television – Series	Tony McNamara (for "Ice")	Won	
2024	British Academy Television Craft Awards	Best Costume Design	Sharon Long	Won	
2024	Costume Designers Guild Awards	Excellence in Period Television	Sharon Long (for "Choose Your Weapon")	Won	
2024	Golden Globe Awards	Best Actress – Television Series Musical or Comedy	Elle Fanning	Nominated	
2024	Satellite Awards	Best Actress in a Comedy or Musical Series	Elle Fanning	Nominated	
2024	Writers Guild of America Awards	Episodic Comedy	Tony McNamara (for "Ice")	Nominated	

== See also ==
- Catherine the Great (1995 television movie)
- Ekaterina (Russian television series)
