= John Glaser (costume designer) =

American costume designer

- Born: John Walter Glaser III
- Occupation: Costume designer
- Years active: 1982–present

John Walter Glaser III is an American costume designer. He won a Primetime Emmy Award and was nominated for two more in the category Outstanding Costumes for his work on the television program Bridgerton.
