= Bounty Hunters (British TV series) =

British comedy drama television series

- Genre: Comedy drama
- Created by: Jack Whitehall; Freddy Syborn
- Directed by: Will Sinclair
- Starring: Jack Whitehall; Rosie Perez; Charity Wakefield; Robert Lindsay; Sophie Thompson; Olga Merediz; Daniella Piper; G-Rod
- Composers: Ben Foster; Nick Foster
- Country of origin: United Kingdom
- Original language: English
- No. of series: 2
- No. of episodes: 11

Production
- Executive producers: Ben Cavey; Jon Mountague; Morwenna Gordon; Freddy Syborn; Jack Whitehall
- Producer: Pippa Brown
- Production company: Tiger Aspect Productions

Original release
- Network: Sky One
- Release: 25 October 2017 – 4 April 2019

Bounty Hunters is a British comedy drama series that first aired on 25 October 2017 on Sky One. Pairing an odd couple together in a series of mishaps. Barnaby is a mild mannered and often bumbling son of an antiques dealer in England, while Nina is a tough American bounty hunter from New York, who both find themselves trying to save their respective families from a Mexican cartel.

== Cast ==
- Jack Whitehall as Barnaby Walker
- Rosie Perez as Nina Morales
- Charity Wakefield as Leah Walker
- Robert Lindsay as Nigel Walker
- Sophie Thompson as Fiona Walker
- Olga Merediz as Maria
- Daniella Piper as Sofia
- Ian Gerard Whyte as Uri
- Gabriel "G-Rod" Rodriguez as Pancho
- Christian Ochoa as Angel
- Amber Agar as DI Suleiman
- Ben Bailey Smith as DS Evans
- Bradley James as Webb and Keegan Sherman
- Daniel Faraldo as Alejandro
- Jacqueline King as Penelope

== Episodes ==
=== Season 1 (2017) ===
No.	Title	Directed by	Written by	Original release date
1	"Episode #1.1"	William Sinclair	Jack Whitehall and Freddy Syborn	October 25, 2017
2	"Episode #1.2"	William Sinclair	Freddy Syborn	November 1, 2017
3	"Episode #1.3"	William Sinclair	Freddy Syborn	November 8, 2017
4	"Episode #1.4"	William Sinclair	Freddy Syborn	November 15, 2017
5	"Episode #1.5"	William Sinclair	Freddy Syborn	November 22, 2017
6	"Episode #1.6"	William Sinclair	Freddy Syborn	November 29, 2017

=== Season 2 (2019) ===
No.	Title	Directed by	Written by	Original release date
1	"Episode #2.1"	Toby MacDonald	Freddy Syborn	March 14, 2019
2	"Episode #2.2"	Toby MacDonald	Freddy Syborn	March 14, 2019
3	"Episode #2.3"	Toby MacDonald	Freddy Syborn	March 21, 2019
4	"Episode #2.4"	Toby MacDonald	Freddy Syborn	March 28, 2019
5	"Episode #2.5"	Toby MacDonald	Freddy Syborn	April 4, 2019

== Production ==
The script for Bounty Hunters was written by Jack Whitehall and Freddy Syborn.

== Reception ==
Ellen Jones of The Guardian criticized Bounty Hunters for being a comedy-drama, calling it "TV's most used and abused genre".
