= Grace Molony =

English actress

- Born: Grace Georgina Hilary Molony; 1995/1996; Wandsworth, London, England
- Education: LAMDA
- Years active: 2017–present

Grace Georgina Hilary Molony (born 1995/1996) is an English actress. She is known for her theatre work and her role in the Hulu series The Great (2020–2023).

== Early life and education ==
Molony was born in the South London Borough of Wandsworth and grew up in Teddington. She attended the Tiffin Girls' School. She joined the youth theatre at the Rose Theatre Kingston and went on to study at the London Academy of Music and Dramatic Art (LAMDA), graduating in 2017. Molony is a patron of Dragon Drama, a local youth drama group.

== Career ==
A month before graduating from LAMDA in 2017, Molony was cast in The Country Girls at the Minerva Theatre, Chichester, marking Molony's professional stage debut. For her performance, Molony won Best Actress in a Play at The Stage Debut Awards. The following year, she made her West End debut as the titular character of Oscar Wilde's Lady Windermere's Fan at the Vaudeville Theatre and her feature film debut portraying Dorothy Stafford in Mary Queen of Scots.

In 2019, Molony had roles in The Watsons at the Minerva Theatre and Menier Chocolate Factory as well as The Glass Piano at the Coronet Theatre. For her performance in the former, Molony was nominated for Emerging Talent Award at the Evening Standard Theatre Awards. In 2020, she appeared in the film adaptation of Artemis Fowl and began playing Queen Agnes of Sweden in the Hulu historical comedy-drama The Great. A recurring role for the first two seasons, she was promoted to the main cast for the third and final season.

== Filmography ==
=== Film ===
Year	Title	Role	Notes
2015	The Law of Moments	Lucy	Short film
2018	Mary Queen of Scots	Dorothy Stafford	
2020	Porcelain	Belle	Short film
2020	Artemis Fowl	Jasmine Sapwood	
2020	Bacon	Ruth	Short film
2024	We Live in Time	Nurse	
TBA	Mourning Sickness		

=== Television ===
Year	Title	Role	Notes
2018, 2020	Doctors	Charley Webb / Becky Allison	2 episodes
2020	Father Brown	Hannah Baxley	Episode: "The Queen Bee"
2020–2023	The Great	Queen Agnes of Sweden	Recurring role (seasons 1–2); Main role (season 3)
2025	Sister Boniface Mysteries	Pamela Millington	Episode: "Killer Heels"

== Stage ==
Year	Title	Role	Notes
2017	The Country Girls	Kate	Minerva Theatre, Chichester
2018	Lady Windermere's Fan	Lady Windermere	Vaudeville Theatre, London
2019	The Watsons	Emma Watson	Minerva Theatre, Chichester / Menier Chocolate Factory, London
2019	The Glass Piano	Alexandra	Coronet Theatre, London
2023–2024	The Enfield Haunting	Margaret Hodgson	Ambassadors Theatre, London
2025	Little Women	Jo March	UK tour

== Awards and nominations ==
Year	Award	Category	Work	Result	Ref.
2017	The Stage Debut Awards	Best Actress in a Play	The Country Girls	Won	
2019	Evening Standard Theatre Awards	Emerging Talent Award	The Watsons	Nominated	
