= Yesterday Was a Weird Day =

Theatrical testimony to July 2005 London bombings

Yesterday Was a Weird Day is a documentary theatre production which brings together personal testimonies from the London bombings of 7 July 2005. The production was hastily put together for the 2005 Edinburgh Festival, where it was critically acclaimed for its sensitivity in dealing with the tragic events of that day. The play later ran, with improved set design and added testimonials, at the Battersea Arts Centre in London, during 2006.

In the aftermath of the 7 July bombings, directors Ben Freedman and Mimi Poskitt, and journalist Ruaridh Arrow, began collecting and recording experiences and stories from those involved. Immediate reactions from the day were juxtaposed with interviews conducted after the event. These interviews are re-enacted on stage, word for word, alongside visual and audio footage.

Yesterday Was a Weird Day was performed by actors, Aykut Himli, Janette Nicolle Nzekwe, Toby Manley and Charity Wakefield.

The result was described as a vivid, honest and uniquely moving form of documentary theatre. The production featured reflections from George Galloway, David Shayler, a defected Iraqi Army Colonel, leading Muslim scholars, and politicians.

The play was notable for Ruaridh Arrow's interview with former Foreign Secretary Robin Cook, which attracted national press attention when the politician died just days after it was recorded. It has been widely reported as Cook's last interview, and extracts were published as part of his obituary in The Guardian newspaper.

Only a small percentage of the material gathered is staged. In order to allow audiences to hear and read all of the interviews and recordings, transcripts were available to view after the performance. Yesterday Was a Weird Day is a fluid and constantly moving work. There is opportunity for audiences to contribute to this documentation of 7 July by recording their own thoughts with the producers. These contributions will feed into the future development of the piece.

Look Left Look Right donated proceeds from this production to the London Bombings Relief Charitable Fund.
