= Robert Wilfort =

Welsh actor

- Born: Robert Wilfort; Porthcawl, Wales
- Occupation: Actor
- Years active: 1998–present

Robert Wilfort is a Welsh actor from Porthcawl, who has made many appearances on British television and film. He is best known for his role as Jason West in BBC's Gavin & Stacey. His other television appearances have included roles in series such as Wolf Hall and Bridgerton.

== Early life ==
Wilfort was born in Porthcawl, Wales and now lives in South England with his long-term partner.

== Career ==
Wilfort's film roles have included Dr Simon Griffith in Mike Leigh's All or Nothing (2002) and Rita Skeeter's photographer in Harry Potter and the Goblet of Fire (2005). He also had a minor role in The Libertine (2004) and co-starred in Man Up (2015).

Wilfort played the history teacher Tom Barkley in the E4 teen drama series Skins and Mr Fisher in BBC's White Van Man. He also has a recurring role as Jason West in the BAFTA award-winning TV show Gavin & Stacey, the role for which he is best known.

In 2008, he appeared in his underwear in an advert for Barclaycard, where he descends an enormous water slide from his city office, all the way through the city and back to his home. In addition, he featured in adverts for Crunchy Nut cereal and the London recycling campaign.

Since 2015, Wilfort has been the voice of Samson (UK/US) in the CGI series of Thomas & Friends. Also in 2015 he appeared as George Cavendish in the BBC's adaptation of Hilary Mantel's novel Wolf Hall and in Bridgerton. In 2015 and 2016 he played Bob Cratchit in the BBC drama Dickensian.

In 2018, he played the role of Lord Liverpool in Mike Leigh's Peterloo Theatre credits include plays at Chichester Festival Theatre, West Yorkshire Playhouse, Soho Theatre, Trafalgar Studios and Theatre Clwyd.

In 2022, Wilfort portrayed Spike Milligan in the touring production of SPIKE, written by Ian Hislop and Nick Newman. Then in May 2023, he appeared in episodes of the BBC soap opera Doctors as Ross Hutchinson.

== Filmography ==
=== Film ===
Year	Title	Role	Notes
2002	All or Nothing	Doctor	
2004	The Life and Death of Peter Sellers	Motorcycle Delivery Man	
2004	The Libertine	Huysmans	
2005	Harry Potter and the Goblet of Fire	Bozo the Photographer	
2008	Me and Orson Welles	Radio Director	
2011	Hundreds and Thousands	Jonathan	
2012	8 Minutes Idle	Bryan	
2014	A Wonderful Christmas Time	Gary Greene	
2015	Brand New-U	Surgeon Two Peter	Titled as Identicals in the United States
2015	Man Up	Ryan	
2016	Grimsby	Harold Lowsley	
2016	The Huntsman: Winter's War	Nobleman	
2016	Thomas & Friends: The Great Race	Samson and a Great Railway Show Judge (voice)	UK/US versions
2018	Peterloo	Lord Liverpool, the Prime Minister	
2018	Last Summer	Dr. Glyn Davies	
2021	The Dig	Billy Lyons	

=== Television ===
Year	Title	Role	Notes
1999	Murder Most Horrid	Gaunt Jr.	Episode: "Frozen"
1999	High Hopes: Saving Private Ryan	Hoffman	Television movie
1999	The Blonde Bombshell	Lewis	Episode: "#1.2"; Television miniseries
2002	Grass	PC Harriet	8 episodes
2002	Holby City	JB Fallows	Episode: "High Risk"
2003	Lucky Jim	Evan Johns	Television movie
2003	The Bill	Clive Kittle	Episode: "180: Lured in to the Trap"
2004	Comedy Lab	Various	Episode: "Clitheroe"
2005–2007	Coronation Street	Estate Agent	3 episodes
2006	Pulling	Brian	Episode: "#1.2"
2007	Raging	Various Characters	Television movie
2007	Skins	Tom	3 episodes
2007–2010	Gavin & Stacey	Jason West	6 episodes
2008	M.I. High	Nigel	Episode: "The Big Bling"
2008	Beautiful People	Mr. Bell	Episode: "How I Got My Nose"
2009	Casualty	Steve	Episode: "Not Over 'Til the Fat Lady Sings"
2010	The Persuasionists	Peter	Episode: "Being Creative"
2010	Ashes to Ashes	Rick Travers	Episode: "#3.5"
2010	D.O.A.	Danny	Television movie
2011	Campus	Customer No. 1	Episode: "Publication, Publication, Publication"
2012	White Van Man	Mr. Fisher	Episode: "Charity"
2012	Doctors	Craig Snelling	Episode: "The Woman at the Bus Stop"
2013	Love Matters	Jobsy	Episode: "Officially Special"
2013	Casualty	Mike Priestly	Episode: "There's No Place Like Home"
2014	Citizen Khan	Gabe	Episode: "A Khan Family Christmas"
2015	Wolf Hall	George Cavendish	Episodes: "Three Card Trick" and "Entirely Beloved"
2015	Jekyll and Hyde	Hotel Manager	Episode: "The Harbinger"
2015–2016	Dickensian	Bob Cratchit	20 episodes
2015–2018	Thomas & Friends	Samson (voice)	UK/US versions Recurring cast
2016	Power Monkeys	Brett	6 episodes
2017	Endeavour	Lester Fagen	Episode: "Lazaretto"
2019	Piss Off, I Love You	Hugh	Recurring cast
2019	The Crown	Documentary Director	Episode: "Bubbikins"
2019	Gavin & Stacey	Jason West	Christmas Special
2020	Cursed	Royal Aide	Episode: "Nimue"
2021	Sex Education	Mark	Series 3
2021	Tear Along the Dotted Line	Additional cast (voice)	Episode: "Episode 6"
2022	Bridgerton	Mr Finch	Series 2, 2 episodes
2023	Vera	Cal Wallace	Series 12 Episode 1: "Against the Tide"
2023	Doctors	Terry Hutchinson	Recurring role
2024	Gavin & Stacey	Jason West	"The Finale"
2026	Death Valley	Owen Skinner	Series 2, Episode 5

=== Video games ===
Year	Title	Role	Notes
2013	Assassin's Creed IV: Black Flag	Additional multiplayer voices	
