= Charity Wakefield =

British actress (born 1980)

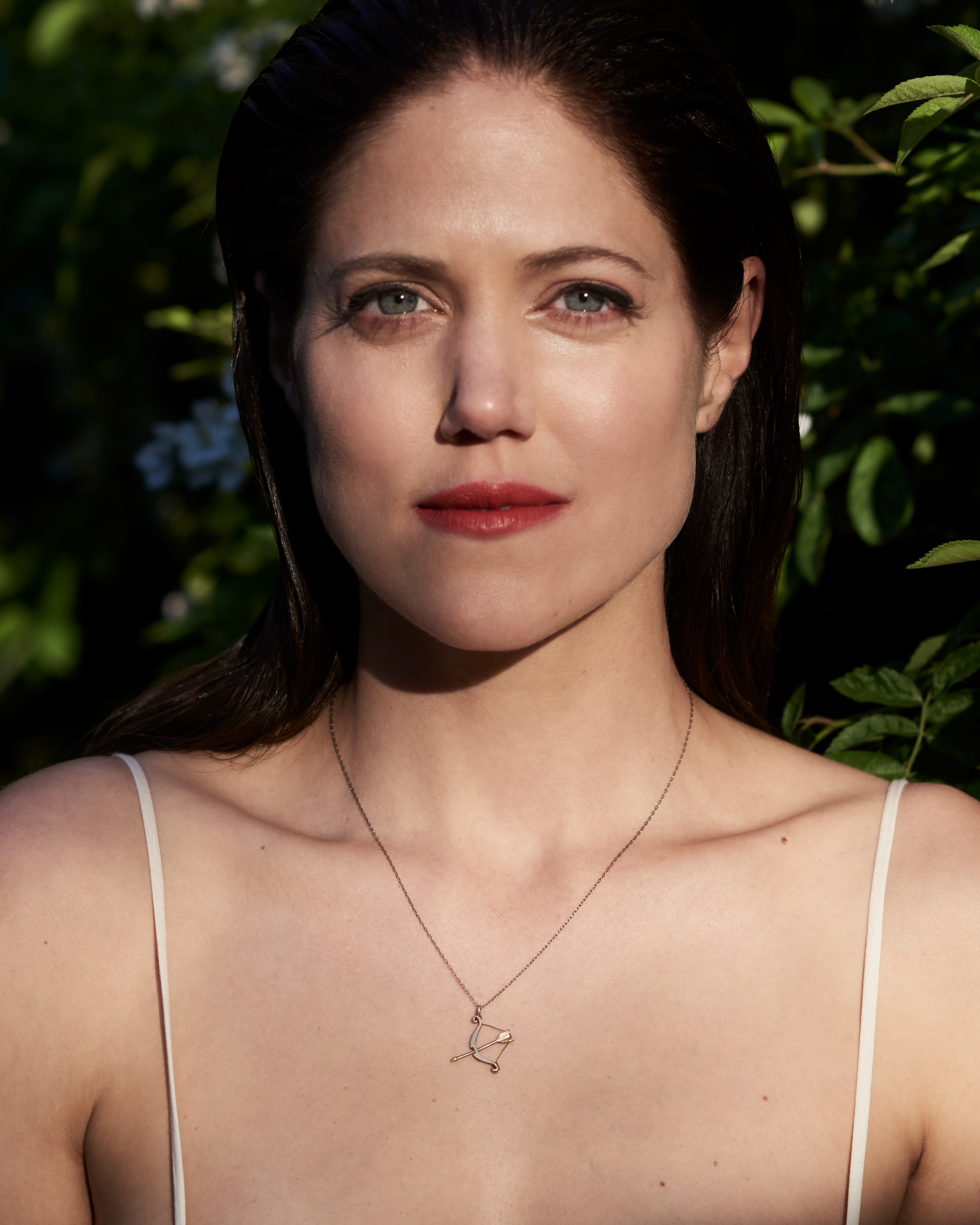
- Born: 18 September 1980 (age 46); Tunbridge Wells, Kent, England
- Education: Oxford School of Drama
- Occupation: Actress
- Years active: 2004–present
- Spouse: David Newman (m. 2016)

Charity Wakefield (born 18 September 1980) is an English actress. Her appearances include roles in Sense & Sensibility (2008), Casualty 1900s (2008–2009), Wolf Hall and The Player (2015), Close to the Enemy (2016), The Halcyon, Genius, and Bounty Hunters (2017), and as Georgina Dymova in The Great (2020–2023).

== Early life and education ==
Charity Rose Wakefield was born on 18 September 1980 in Tunbridge Wells. Her first taste of acting was in an amateur dramatics school production of Sleeping Beauty in 1987. Wakefield attended a three-year acting course at Oxford School of Drama graduating in 2003. Besides acting, Wakefield plays the violin and has a strong soprano singing voice.

== Career ==
Wakefield made her screen debut in 2004, in (Past Present Future) Imperfect. She starred in a BBC1 production of Rapunzel, in which Rapunzel is a young tennis star, and also appeared in Casualty 1907.

Her theatre credits include Yesterday Was a Weird Day, a production about the 2005 London bombings, Constance in The Three Musketeers at the Bristol Old Vic, and Elaine in The Graduate, at the New Vic; she met her future husband, David Newman, when they acted together in The Graduate. Wakefield's performance as Susan in Baby with the Bathwater at the Old Red Lion Theatre was called "fabulous." In 2008 Wakefield toured in a revival of W. Somerset Maugham's The Circle at the Chichester Festival Theatre, as well as working on the BBC comedy pilot Freddi.

Wakefield played a lead role as Marianne Dashwood in the BBC production of Jane Austen's Sense and Sensibility. She appeared in the Channel 4 drama Any Human Heart and played the lead in the British film noir Scar Tissue. In March 2012 she was cast in Mockingbird Lane, the re-imagining of The Munsters for NBC.

Wakefield appeared as Mary Boleyn in the 2015 BBC2 television series Wolf Hall. She also appeared in the NBC drama The Player with Philip Winchester and Wesley Snipes.

On Christmas Day 2016, she was one of the principal guest stars in the BBC1 Doctor Who Christmas special "The Return of Doctor Mysterio".

In 2017, she appeared in two episodes of the ITV drama The Halcyon, playing Charity Lambert. Wakefield appeared in the main cast of both series (2017 and 2019) of the Sky One comedy drama Bounty Hunters, playing Leah Hoover, sister of the character of series co-creator and co-lead Jack Whitehall.

In 2020, she was cast in a main role as Georgina Dymova in Hulu's Historical comedy-drama The Great, alongside Elle Fanning and Nicholas Hoult.

== Filmography ==
=== Film ===
Year	Title	Role	Notes
2004	(Past Present Future) Imperfect	Beanie	
2007	Exitz	Billy	
2009	Vivaldi, the Red Priest	Ludovica	
2009	Burlesque Fairytales	Grace	
2009	Act of God	Laura O'Connor	
2011	National Theatre Live: The Cherry Orchard	Anya	
2012	The Raven	Field's Maid	
2012	Day of the Flowers	Ailie	
2012	Scared	Abby	Short film
2012	In Absence	Abi	Short film
2013	Scar Tissue	Sam	
2014	Serena	Agatha	
2017	A Midsummer Night's Dream	Quince	
2017	Kill Switch	Mia	
2017	Wraps	Ivy	Short film
2020	Actress	Casting Director	Short film
2020	The Mechanicals of Hemp	Robin / Snug / Oberon	Short film
2024	Scoop	Princess Beatrice	
2026	Preschool	Lauren	

=== Television ===
Year	Title	Role	Notes
2004	Hex	Lucy	Episode: "Life Goes On"
2006	Jane Eyre	Miss Temple	Episode: "1.1"
2007	Doctors	Carole Hilton	Episode: "Personal Services"
2008	Fairy Tales	Billy Jane Brooke	Episode: "Rapunzel"
2008	Sense & Sensibility	Marianne Dashwood	Main cast
2008–2009	Casualty 1900s	Ethel Bennett	Main cast
2010	Legally Mad	Brady Hamm	TV movie
2010	Any Human Heart	Land Fothergill	Episode: "1.1"
2011	Midsomer Murders	Ruth Lambert	Episode: "The Oblong Murders"
2012	Leaving	Phoebe	Miniseries
2012	Mockingbird Lane	Marilyn Munster	TV special
2013	Agatha Christie's Marple	Molly Kendall	Episode: "A Caribbean Mystery"
2014	High Moon	Eve	TV movie
2015	Wolf Hall	Mary Boleyn	Miniseries
2015	The Player	Cassandra King	Main cast
2016	Close to the Enemy	Julia	Miniseries
2016	Doctor Who	Lucy	Episode: "The Return of Doctor Mysterio"
2016	Broken	Jules	Episode: "Pilot"
2017	The Halcyon	Charity Lambert	Episodes: "1.1", "1.2"
2017	Genius	Betty	Episodes: "Einstein: Chapters 1 & 8"
2017	Bounty Hunters	Leah Walker	Main cast
2018	Salvage	Gwen	TV movie
2020–2023	The Great	Georgina Dymova	Main cast
2025	Jane Austen: Rise of a Genius	herself	Miniseries (Episodes "1.1" and "1.2")
