= Red Tails (soundtrack) =

Red Tails (Original Motion Picture Soundtrack)

Soundtrack album by Terence Blanchard and various artists
- Released: January 17, 2012
- Recorded: June 4–7, 2011
- Studios: Dvořák Hall, Rudolfinum, Prague
- Genre: Film score
- Length: 71:42
- Label: Sony Masterworks
- Producer: Terence Blanchard

Terence Blanchard chronology
Just Wright (2010)	Red Tails (Original Motion Picture Soundtrack) (2012)	Black or White (2015)

Red Tails (Original Motion Picture Soundtrack) is the soundtrack album to the 2012 war film Red Tails, directed by Anthony Hemingway. The film's musical score is composed by Terence Blanchard with 28 original pieces from the score and four additional compositions from other musicians used in the film. Blanchard recorded the score two years ago and recorded the film's music at the Dvořák Hall in Rudolfinum at Prague for three days. The album was released through Sony Masterworks on January 17, 2012.

== Critical reception ==
Thom Jurek of AllMusic wrote "This is Blanchard's most unusual and populist score by Hollywood standards; that said, it's a complete gas to listen to." James Adams of The Globe and Mail wrote that Blanchard's score "looks good and feels epic". David Roark of Paste summarized that Blanchard's "sappy" score stylizes the film's vintage look.

== Track listing ==
Red Tails (Original Motion Picture Soundtrack) track listing
No.	Title	Artist(s)	Length
1.	"Opening Titles"		3:25
2.	"The Train"		2:02
3.	"The Church"		1:02
4.	"Visit Sofia"		0:49
5.	"Operation Shingle"		3:56
6.	"Lightning in Trouble"		0:42
7.	"German Airfield"		1:34
8.	"Victory Rolls"		1:08
9.	"Junior Medical / Luntz Screening"		3:33
10.	"Lightning Jail"		1:40
11.	"Bomber Briefing"		2:27
12.	"Takeoff"		1:58
13.	"Waiting for Bombers"		1:49
14.	"Deacon Damaged"		3:34
15.	"German Destroyer"		3:20
16.	"Deacon's Crash"		2:11
17.	"Junior Prison"		2:17
18.	"The Proposal"		0:40
19.	"Junior Escapes"		2:10
20.	"Luntz Berlin"		1:58
21.	"Paper Plane"		0:58
22.	"Mission Orders / Stance Berlin"		1:49
23.	"Maurice Killed"		2:03
24.	"Attack from Above"		0:48
25.	"Pretty Boy Killed"		1:36
26.	"Lightning is Hit"		3:22
27.	"Lightning's Gone"		2:24
28.	"End Credits / America the Beautiful"		4:31
29.	"It's Been a Long, Long Time"	Harry James and His Orchestra	3:24
30.	"Boogie Woogie Bugle Boy"	The Andrews Sisters with Vic Schoen and His Orchestra	2:43
31.	"Blue Skies"	Maxine Sullivan and Her Orchestra	3:01
32.	"Bless You"	The Ink Spots	2:48
Total length:			71:42

== Personnel ==
Credits adapted from liner notes.

- Terence Blanchard – composer, producer, orchestrator, trumpet
- Adam Klemens – conductor
- Howard Drossin – orchestrator
- Kendrick Scott – percussion
- FILMharmonic Orchestra and Choir – performer
- Fabian Alamazan – piano
- Frank Wolf – recording, mixing

== Accolades ==
Accolades for Red Tails (Original Motion Picture Soundtrack)
Award	Date of ceremony	Category	Result	Ref.
Black Reel Awards	February 7, 2013	Outstanding Original Score	Nominated	
