= National champion =

National champion may refer to:

- The winner of a national championship in sports or other contests
- National champions are large companies dominant in their fields and favoured by the governments of the countries in which they are based
- National Champions (film), an American sports drama film starring Stephan James and J. K. Simmons
