= Genius (American TV series) =

2017 TV series

- Genre: Biographical drama; Anthology
- Developed by: Noah Pink (seasons 1–2); Ken Biller (seasons 1–2); Suzan-Lori Parks (season 3); Jeff Stetson (season 4)
- Starring: Season 1: Geoffrey Rush; Johnny Flynn; Samantha Colley; Richard Topol; Michael McElhatton; Emily Watson; Ralph Brown; Season 2: Antonio Banderas; Clémence Poésy; Alex Rich; Season 3: Cynthia Erivo; Malcolm Barrett; Patrice Covington; Rebecca Naomi Jones; David Cross; Kimberly Hébert Gregory; Shaian Jordan; Courtney B. Vance; Season 4: Kelvin Harrison Jr.; Aaron Pierre; Weruche Opia; Jayme Lawson; Ron Cephas Jones; Gary Carr; Hubert Point-Du Jour; Lennie James; Lisa Gay Hamilton; Sasha Compere
- Theme music composer: Hans Zimmer
- Composer: Lorne Balfe
- Country of origin: United States
- Original language: English
- No. of seasons: 4
- No. of episodes: 36

Production
- Executive producers: Gigi Pritzker; Rachel Shane; Jeff Cooney; Sam Sokolow; Brian Grazer; Ron Howard; Francie Calfo; Ken Biller; Chris Cooney; Alan Sam Polsky; Gabe Polsky; John Valentine; Anthony Hemingway (season 3–); Suzan-Lori Parks (season 3–); Clive Davis (season 3–); Craig Kallman (season 3–); Diana Son (season 3–)
- Producers: William M. Connor; Steven Felder; Robert M. Williams Jr.; Anna Culp; Kelly A. Manners
- Production locations: Prague, Czech Republic; Málaga, Spain; Barcelona, Spain; Paris, France; Budapest, Hungary; Szentendre, Hungary; Etyek, Hungary; Atlanta, Georgia
- Cinematography: Mathias Herndl
- Editors: J. Kathleen Gibson; James Wilcox; James Kilton; Mark Sadlek
- Camera setup: Single-camera
- Running time: 43–62 minutes
- Production companies: Imagine Television Studios; Paperboy Productions; MWM Studios (Note: Known as OddLot Entertainment until 2018); EUE / Sokolow Entertainment; Warner Music Entertainment (season 3); Tumbleweed Productions (season 3–present); 20th Television (Note: Known as Fox 21 Television Studios until 2020 and Touchstone Television until 2020)

Original release
- Network: National Geographic
- Release: April 25, 2017 – February 22, 2024

Genius is an American biographical anthology drama series developed by Noah Pink and Kenneth Biller which premiered on National Geographic. The first season, which aired between April and June 2017, followed the life of Albert Einstein, from his early years, through his time as a patent clerk, and into his later years as a physicist who developed the theory of relativity; the season is based on the 2007 book Einstein: His Life and Universe by Walter Isaacson. The second season, which aired between April and June 2018, followed the life and artistry of Pablo Picasso.

In April 2018, National Geographic renewed the series for a third season. The season was originally supposed to focus on Mary Shelley, but this was changed during development to instead focus on Aretha Franklin. It aired in March 2021. In December 2020, the series was renewed for a fourth season to be released on National Geographic and Disney+. The fourth season follows the lives of Martin Luther King Jr. and Malcolm X and premiered on February 1, 2024.

Throughout the years the series received several nominations and accolades, including two Primetime Emmy Awards and an NAACP Image Awards.

== Synopsis ==
The first season chronicles two periods in the life of Albert Einstein: the first as a patent clerk struggling to gain a teaching position and doctorate, the second as a scientist respected for his development of the theory of relativity.

The second season chronicles two periods in the life of Pablo Picasso: the first as a young man discovering his talent, the second as a celebrated artist struggling with the rise of fascism and the price of fame.

The third season chronicles two periods in the life of Aretha Franklin: the first as a young gospel singer impregnated at the age of twelve, the second as a rising star.

The fourth season chronicles the lives of Martin Luther King Jr. and Malcolm X.

== Cast and characters ==
=== Season 1 ===
==== Main ====
- Geoffrey Rush as Albert Einstein

- Johnny Flynn as Young Albert Einstein

- Samantha Colley as Mileva Marić

- Nikki Hahn as young Mileva

- Richard Topol as Fritz Haber
- Michael McElhatton as Philipp Lenard
- Emily Watson as Elsa Einstein

- Gwendolyn Ellis as young Elsa

- Ralph Brown as Max Planck

==== Recurring ====
- Robert Lindsay as Hermann Einstein
- Claire Rushbrook as Pauline Einstein
- Helen Monks as Maja Einstein
- Nicholas Rowe as Jost Winteler
- Lucy Russell as Pauline Winteler
- Shannon Tarbet as Marie Winteler
- Alicia von Rittberg as Anna Winteler
- George Webster as Julius Winteler
- Henry Goodman as Walther Rathenau
- Alistair Petrie as Heinrich Weber
- Jon Fletcher as Marcel Grossmann
- Seth Gabel as Michele Besso
- Sally Dexter as elder Mileva Marić
- Nikola Đuričko as Leo Szilard
- David Dencik as Niels Bohr
- Adrian Lukis as Wilhelm Röntgen
- Predrag Bjelac as Miloš Marić
- Catherine McCormack as Marija Ružić–Marić
- Corrado Invernizzi as Pierre Curie
- Klára Issová as Marie Curie
- Charity Wakefield as Betty Neumann
- Ania Bukstein as Margarita Konenkova
- Jodhi May as Helen Dukas
- Zoe Telford as Clara Haber
- T. R. Knight as J. Edgar Hoover
- Vincent Kartheiser as Raymond H. Geist
- Silvina Buchbauer as Katharina Lenard
- Eugene Simon as Eduard Einstein
- Ed Stoppard as Hans Albert Einstein
- Joseph Arkley as David Bohm

=== Season 2 ===
==== Main ====
- Antonio Banderas as Pablo Picasso

- Alex Rich as young Pablo
- Alessio Scalzotto as 14-year-old
  Pablo
- Timothy Lyons as 9-year-old
  Pablo

- Clémence Poésy as Françoise Gilot
- Samantha Colley as Dora Maar

==== Recurring ====
- Poppy Delevingne as Marie-Thérèse Walter
- Robert Sheehan as Carles Casagemas
- David Wilmot as José Ruiz y Blasco
- Jordi Mollà as Salvador Ruiz
- Edward Akrout as Laurent Debienne
- Charlie Carrick as Manuel Pallarès
- Sebastian Roché as Emile Gilot
- Adrian Schiller as Jaime Sabartés
- Will Keen as Paul Rosenberg
- Maria Jose Bavio as María Picasso y López
- Aisling Franciosi as Fernande Olivier
- Stéphane Caillard as Geneviève Aliquot
- Bruno Paviot as Marcel
- Elena Martinez as Dolores
- T. R. Knight as Max Jacob
- Seth Gabel as Guillaume Apollinaire
- Tracee Chimo as Gertrude Stein
- Johnny Flynn as Alain Cuny
- Kerr Logan as Georges Braque
- Tchéky Karyo as Henri Rousseau
- Jack Brett Anderson as Géry Pieret
- Eileen O'Higgins as Eva Gouel
- Gerran Howell as Karl-Heinz Wiegels
- Lucas Englander as Daniel-Henry Kahnweiler
- Simon Buret as Jean Cocteau
- Sofia Doniants as Olga Khokhlova
- Nicola Perot as Ubaldo Oppi
- Tom Cullen as Luc Simon
- Zachary Fall as Paulo Picasso
- Michael Gor as Sergei Diaghilev
- Margaux Chatelier as Geneviève Laporte
- Dimitri Leonidas as Kostas Axelos
- Ed Stoppard as Paul Éluard
- Vincent Londez as André Breton
- Valentina Bellè as Jacqueline Roque
- Emile Feltesse as Jean Renoir
- Sand Van Roy as Florelle
- Michael McElhatton as Jonas Salk
- Luis Soto as Eugenio Arias
- Andrew Buchan as Henri Matisse

=== Season 3 ===
==== Main ====
- Cynthia Erivo as Aretha Franklin
  - Shaian Jordan as young Aretha
- Courtney B. Vance as C. L. Franklin
- David Cross as Jerry Wexler
- Malcolm Barrett as Ted White
- Patrice Covington as Erma Franklin
- Kimberly Hébert Gregory as Ruth Bowen
- Rebecca Naomi Jones as Carolyn Franklin

==== Recurring ====
- Stacey Sargeant as Dinah Washington
- Pauletta Washington as Rachel Franklin
- Collete L. Coward as Aretha's Piano Hand double
- Aubriana Davis as Young Erma
- Steven G. Norfleet as Cecil Franklin
- Bri'anna Harper as Little Re singing double
- Sydney Hunter as Young Carolyn
- Tina Fears as Clara Ward
- Antonique Smith as Barbara Franklin
- Marque Richardson as King Curtis
- Braelyn Edwards as Clarence
- Tyler Richardson as Edward
- Omar J. Dorsey as James Cleveland
- Tip "T.I." Harris as Ken Cunningham
- Jerren Jackson as Little Teddy
- Willie Repoley as Tom Dowd
- Drake Strickland as Young Cecil
- Luke James as Glynn Turman

=== Season 4 ===
==== Main ====
- Kelvin Harrison Jr. as Martin Luther King Jr.
  - Jalyn Hall as young Martin (Pilot)
- Aaron Pierre as Malcolm X
- Weruche Opia as Coretta Scott King
- Jayme Lawson as Betty Shabazz
- Ron Cephas Jones as Elijah Muhammad
- Gary Carr as Clyde X
- Hubert Point-Du Jour as Ralph Abernathy

==== Recurring ====
- Lennie James as Martin Luther King Sr.
- LisaGay Hamilton as Alberta Williams King
- Ashley Romans as Ella Mae
- Donal Logue as Strom Thurmond
- Griffin Matthews as Bayard Rustin
- Sasha Compere as Juanita Abernathy
- John C. McGinley as Lyndon B. Johnson

== Episodes ==
Season	Title	Episodes	Originally released	
Season	Title	Episodes	First released	Last released
1	Einstein	10	April 25, 2017	June 20, 2017
2	Picasso	10	April 24, 2018	June 19, 2018
3	Aretha	8	March 21, 2021	March 24, 2021
4	MLK/X	8	February 1, 2024	February 22, 2024

=== Season 1: Einstein (2017) ===
No. overall	No. in season	Title	Directed by	Written by	Original release date	U.S. viewers (millions)
1	1	"Chapter One"	Ron Howard	Story by : Noah Pink and Ken Biller; Teleplay by : Noah Pink	April 25, 2017	1.38
As Antisemitism reaches a fever pitch in 1930s Germany, physicist Albert Einstein finds himself forced to choose between emigrating to the United States or staying in solidarity with his fellow academics. The struggle evokes memories of his days as a student at Zürich Polytechnic and his first encounter with Mileva Marić, the woman who would become his first wife.
2	2	"Chapter Two"	Minkie Spiro	Angelina Burnett	May 2, 2017	1.05
After butting heads with Mileva, the only female student in his class at Zürich Polytechnic, a young Albert falls in love with this determined fellow student. While the passionate affair fans the flames of their mutual curiosity and love of science, their reckless abandon doesn't go unnoticed by Albert's strict physics lecturer, Professor Weber.
3	3	"Chapter Three"	Minkie Spiro	Mark Lafferty	May 9, 2017	1.02
As a recent university graduate, Albert struggles to make ends meet while trying to land an academic post in a scientific world rigid with tradition and protocol. After finally securing various tutoring jobs, he moves one step closer to being able to provide for his pregnant wife, Mileva, when tragedy strikes.
4	4	"Chapter Four"	Kevin Hooks	Noah Pink	May 16, 2017	0.93
While working at his day job at the Bern patent office, Albert burns the candle at both ends supported by his new wife, writing four new scientific papers including the theory of special relativity, in what will be considered his miracle year. One of his papers attracts the attention of the notable theoretical physicist Max Planck.
5	5	"Chapter Five"	Kevin Hooks	Raf Green	May 23, 2017	0.94
With new teaching duties, Albert finally begins to experience the academic life he long coveted as he develops his theory of general relativity. Enjoying his first taste of acclaim among the most renowned scientific minds in Europe including Marie Curie, Albert falters in his familial responsibilities. His only relief comes from a visit to extended family, where he is introduced to his cousin Elsa.
6	6	"Chapter Six"	James Hawes	Brian Peterson	May 30, 2017	1.02
After moving his family to Berlin for work, and to be closer to his new love Elsa, Albert sets out to prove his theory of general relativity. He enlists the help of an astronomer to photograph a solar eclipse in Russia, but the expedition goes awry. Albert's affair becomes less secret, and Elsa forces an ultimatum: divorce Mileva or lose her forever.
7	7	"Chapter Seven"	James Hawes	Kelly Souders	June 6, 2017	1.06
Exhausted and worn out, Albert's attempt to make scientific history is put to the test as he begins to experience health issues. Meanwhile, sweeping patriotism in the wake of the war has corrupted one of his closest friends, Fritz Haber, pitting them against each other. In the German war effort, Albert is the lone scientist to refuse the call to arms.
8	8	"Chapter Eight"	Ken Biller	Angelina Burnett & Francesca Butler	June 13, 2017	1.05
Attempting to flee to the United States, Albert and his wife Elsa find that their visas have been blocked for entry by the U.S. State Department because Albert's politics placed him on the radar of FBI director J. Edgar Hoover. Just days before his departure, Albert must convince the U.S Consul in Germany that he is no threat to the country.
9	9	"Chapter Nine"	Ken Biller	Ken Biller & Raf Green	June 20, 2017	1.04
Albert and Elsa settle into the U.S. while trying to save those he left behind. Although quantum physics continues to vex him, his focus is diverted by the splitting of the atom in Nazi Germany. When tragedy strikes, Albert seeks comfort in the arms of a Russian woman whose intentions are unclear.
10	10	"Chapter Ten"	Ken Biller	Mark Lafferty	June 20, 2017	1.04
After the atomic bomb is dropped and World War II ends, Albert assumes the role of world citizen in his elder years. Having been linked to nuclear weapons, he drowns in guilt and refocuses his efforts to prevent further wars. Inspiration strikes when a young neighbor asks him for homework help, reminding him of the joy that science once brought.

=== Season 2: Picasso (2018) ===
No. overall	No. in season	Title	Directed by	Written by	Original release date	U.S. viewers (millions)
11	1	"Chapter One"	Ken Biller	Ken Biller	April 24, 2018	0.72
While going to art school in Madrid, young Pablo Ruiz rejects the traditional rules of painting in search of his own unique style, and soon changes his last name to Picasso. He moves to Paris and befriends art student Carlos Casagemas, and together they share a studio and sell their art until a terrible tragedy happens. In 1938, Pablo contends with the rising threat of Franco's fascism in his home country of Spain.
12	2	"Chapter Two"	Ken Biller	Ken Biller	April 24, 2018	0.52
Pablo learns that Guernica, an ancient town in the Basque Country, was destroyed by the Nazis, and paints his 1937 mural of the same name depicting the carnage. It is shown in the Spanish Pavilion at the Universal Exposition in Paris. It is critiqued by inspiring French painter Françoise Gilot, who catches Pablo's eye, especially when his current muse, Dora Maar, no longer inspires him to pick up a paintbrush.
13	3	"Chapter Three"	Kevin Hooks	Brian Peterson & Kelly Souders	May 1, 2018	0.26
After the suicide of his heartbroken friend, Pablo struggles with life. He meets poet Max Jacob who helps him through his pain, using it in his art. While he paints, Pablo only sees bleak colors, thus beginning his Blue Period. While back in Barcelona in 1903, to honor Carlos, he creates La Vie. In 1943, Pablo grows closer to Françoise and he shows her how to feel the passion through her work.
14	4	"Chapter Four"	Kevin Hooks	Raf Green	May 8, 2018	0.35
Back in Paris, Pablo reunites with Max and through him meets French poet Guillaume Apollinaire who inspires him to create Family of Saltimbanques, the masterpiece of his Rose Period. But after seeing rival Henri Matisse's work at the Autumn Salon, Pablo pulls his painting from the show. In 1944, Pablo loses Max to the Nazis, and he soon struggles with two love affairs between Dora and Françoise.
15	5	"Chapter Five"	Laura Belsey	Noah Pink	May 15, 2018	0.33
After the French critics denounce all the artists who submitted their work at the Autumn Salon as Matisse imitators, Pablo meets the man himself and is challenged by his radical genius. For years, the two artists try to outdo each other, urged on by brother and sister art collecting duo Leo and Gertrude Stein. When attempts with his first love, Fernande Olivier fail, Pablo seeks inspiration from the primitive African masks at Trocadero Museum and creates Les Demoiselles d'Avignon. In 1947, Pablo convinces Françoise to move in with him.
16	6	"Chapter Six"	Laura Belsey	Matthew Newman	May 22, 2018	0.33
Pablo is inspired by Henri Rousseau, a customs clerk who paints in a distorted style, and starts cubism with Matisse's protégé Georges Braque. The two go on to change the way people see art and they sell many paintings in their new style. After the Mona Lisa is stolen from the Louvre in 1911, Apollinare's secretary Géry Pieret who stole statues from the museum, confesses he knows who did it. Since Pieret sold them the artifacts, Pablo and Apollinare are accused of stealing the beloved Da Vinci painting. Pablo takes Françoise on a getaway to Midi, but she is not impressed. He asks her to have a baby with him.
17	7	"Chapter Seven"	Greg Yaitanes	Wendy Riss	May 29, 2018	0.26
In 1912, Pablo and Georges expand their art movement with radical collages called Crystal Cubism. Pablo's Family of Saltimbanques becomes the most expensive painting in history, selling for 12,650 francs. When World War I begins, Pablo doesn't believe in fighting and remains a pacifist at home while his friends fight in the trenches. But he has his own battles with Fernande having an affair with Italian painter Ubaldo Oppi. Pablo falls in love with her conventional friend, Eva Gouel, wanting to marry her. However, she's diagnosed with lung cancer and dies soon after. After the loss of his father, Pablo has a fling with cabaret singer Gaby Lespinasse, but she is engaged. In 1949, with two kids with Françoise, Pablo, a member of the Communist Party attends the World Peace Council in Paris and creates a symbol of peace.
18	8	"Chapter Eight"	Greg Yaitanes	Stephanie K. Smith	June 5, 2018	0.27
After befriending playwright Jean Cocteau, Pablo designs his ballet, Parade in 1917, and meets his first wife, Olga Khokhlova, a Russian ballerina. He must choose starting a family with his new wife or being around for his old friends. Max decides to stay at a monastery and make his vows to God, while Apollinaire contracts Spanish influenza. As an older man in the early 1950s, Pablo struggles with Françoise who attempts to bring his complex family back into his life. It is a distraction when he tries to continue his legacy with a retrospective of his works.
19	9	"Chapter Nine"	Mathias Herndl	Raf Green & Ali Gordon-Goldstein	June 12, 2018	0.27
Surrealist writer André Breton includes Pablo in the surrealism movement, but he doesn't want to be labeled. When Pablo feels stuck in his marriage with Olga and her snobbish ways, he seeks out someone new. He sees Marie-Thérèse Walter on the streets of Paris and she agrees to let him paint her, thus starting a love affair. In 1935, Pablo needs an outlet and begins writing poetry. His friend, poet Paul Éluard introduces him to Dora, a photographer. After finding out Pablo has been sneaking off to St. Tropez with his young mistress Geneviève Laporte, Françoise leaves him to pursue her artistic goals by designing a ballet for choreographer Janine Charrat, and becomes more than friends with philosopher Kostas Axelos in 1953.
20	10	"Chapter Ten"	Mathias Herndl	Matthew Newman & Noah Pink	June 19, 2018	0.34
After leaving Pablo, Françoise struggles to escape his shadow even when she marries, then divorces art teacher Luc Simon, and later moves to New York City to showcase her art. But, not wanting to only be known as Picasso's former mistress, she fights back by writing a tell-all book about their abusive relationship and gets into a healthy one with doctor Jonas Salk. Meanwhile, Pablo meets Jacqueline Roque and she becomes his last muse and then his second wife after Olga dies in 1955. An aging Pablo withdraws from the public eye to create a neo-expressionist self-portrait. On April 8, 1973, Pablo dies at the age of 91 without a will. The art he leaves behind is worth millions.

=== Season 3: Aretha (2021) ===
No. overall	No. in season	Title	Directed by	Written by	Original release date	U.S. viewers (millions)
21	1	"Respect"	Anthony Hemingway	Suzan-Lori Parks	March 21, 2021	1.38
The episode starts with "Chain of Fools". Aretha Franklin is growing up in the 1950s. In the 1960s, she travels to Muscle Shoals, Alabama to sign a deal with the record label Atlantic Records.
22	2	"Until The Real Thing Comes Along"	Neema Barnette	Story by : Suzan-Lori Parks and Diana Son; Teleplay by : Diana Son	March 21, 2021	1.37
Aretha catches the attention of Jerry Wexler at Atlantic Records in 1966. Little Re has her first touring experience on the Gospel Circuit in 1954 with C.L. Franklin and meets her idol, Clara Ward.
23	3	"Do Right Woman"	Neema Barnette	Nathan Louis Jackson, Suzan-Lori Parks & Diana Son	March 22, 2021	1.04
Aretha Franklin has her first child at 12. Little Aretha Franklin leaves behind her newborn child to return to the Gospel Circuit in 1955, meeting with music legends James Cleveland and Little Sammie Bryant.
24	4	"Unforgettable"	Bille Woodruff	Story by : Gwendolyn M. Parker & Suzan-Lori Parks; Teleplay by : Gwendolyn M. Parker	March 22, 2021	1.07
Aretha is featured on the cover of Time magazine in 1968, but she's devastated when the article focuses on the scandalous details of her personal life; Barbara Franklin and Young C.L. Franklin struggle to establish themselves in Memphis.
25	5	"Young, Gifted and Black"	Anthony Hemingway	Suzan-Lori Parks	March 23, 2021	0.98
Aretha records her protest album Young, Gifted and Black in 1970; despite Jerry Wexler's uncertainty, the album is a success; Barbara Franklin makes a decision that has a devastating effect on Little Re. Franklin starts to speak on political issues and offers to post the bail for Angela Davis.
26	6	"Amazing Grace"	Anthony Hemingway	Becky Mode	March 23, 2021	1.03
Aretha records her bestselling live gospel album Amazing Grace in 1972 at New Temple Missionary Baptist Church; Little Re discovers that she's pregnant with her second child at age 14, forcing her to leave school.
27	7	"Chain of Fools"	Anthony Hemingway	Suzan-Lori Parks	March 24, 2021	0.93
Aretha steals an opportunity from her sister Carolyn; she receives a Grammy nomination but is ultimately snubbed from winning the award; she meets with Arista founder Clive Davis; Jerry Wexler leaves Atlantic Records, and he and Aretha part ways.
28	8	"No One Sleeps"	Anthony Hemingway	Suzan-Lori Parks	March 24, 2021	1.03
Franklin begins a career at Arista with the help of Clive Davis, and in a Grammy performance in 1998, she solidifies her eternal reign as the Queen of Soul. She releases "I Knew You Were Waiting (For Me)" with George Michael in 1987.

=== Season 4: MLK/X (2024) ===
No. overall	No. in season	Title	Directed by	Written by	Original release date	U.S. viewers (millions)
29	1	"Graduation"	Channing Godfrey Peoples	Jeff Stetson	February 1, 2024	0.112
30	2	"Who We Are"	Marta Cunningham	Raphael Jackson, Jr. & Damione Macedon	February 1, 2024	0.076
31	3	"Protect Us"	Marta Cunningham	Raphael Jackson, Jr. & Damione Macedon	February 8, 2024	0.091
32	4	"Watch the Throne"	Crystle Roberson	Maria Warith-Wade	February 8, 2024	N/A
33	5	"Matriarchs"	Crystle Roberson	Sigrid Gilmer	February 15, 2024	N/A
34	6	"The American Promise"	Crystle Roberson	Marta Gene Camps	February 15, 2024	N/A
35	7	"The Sword and the Shield"	Director X	Quran Squire	February 22, 2024	N/A
36	8	"Can You Imagine"	Director X	Maria Warith-Wade	February 22, 2024	N/A

== Production ==
=== Development ===
On April 28, 2016, it was announced that National Geographic had given the production a straight-to-series order, its first ever scripted series. The series was set to be based on the biography Einstein: His Life and Universe by Walter Isaacson and adapted by Noah Pink, who was also expected to co-executive produce. Executive producers were announced to include Brian Grazer, Ron Howard, Francie Calfo, Gigi Pritzker, Rachel Shane, Sam Sokolow, and Jeffrey Cooney. Anna Culp was set to co-produce alongside Melissa Rucker. Ron Howard was expected to direct the first episode of the series. Production companies involved with the series were set to include Imagine TV, Fox 21 TV Studios, OddLot Entertainment and EUE/Sokolow.

On April 19, 2017, National Geographic renewed the series for a second season. The subject of the second season was to have been announced during the finale of the first season, but was instead revealed to be Pablo Picasso the day after the finale, when the network and producers did not want to divert attention away from the season finale. The second season premiered on April 24, 2018.

On April 18, 2018, National Geographic renewed the series for a third season. The season was initially set to follow the life of writer Mary Shelley. Ken Biller is expected to return as showrunner, executive producer and writer. Also returning are executive producers Brian Grazer, Ron Howard, Francie Calfo, Jeff Cooney, Sam Sokolow, Gigi Pritzker, and Rachel Shane. Anna Culp will return as producer. Returning production companies include Imagine TV, MWM Studios, and EUE/Sokolow. On February 10, 2019, it was announced that the subject of the third season would instead be American singer Aretha Franklin, known as "The Queen of Soul". The third season was slated to premiere on May 25, 2020, and air over four consecutive nights, but was delayed due to the coronavirus pandemic and began airing on March 21, 2021.

On December 10, 2020, the series was renewed for a fourth season, which focused on the lives of Martin Luther King Jr. and Malcolm X.

=== Casting ===
==== Season 1 ====
In August 2016, it was announced that Geoffrey Rush and Johnny Flynn would star in the series as Albert Einstein both as an old man and as a young adult, respectively. Additionally, it was reported that Emily Watson would also star in the series and that Michael McElhatton, Seth Gabel, Samantha Colley, Richard Topol, and Vincent Kartheiser had joined the cast. In November 2016, it was announced that Shannon Tarbet, Claire Rushbrook, and Robert Lindsay had been cast in recurring roles. On February 2, 2017, it was reported that T. R. Knight had been cast in the recurring role of J. Edgar Hoover.

==== Season 2 ====
On September 6, 2017, it was announced that Antonio Banderas would star in the second season as Pablo Picasso. On November 2, 2017, it was reported that Alex Rich would co-star in the series sharing the lead role of Picasso. It was further reported that Clémence Poésy, Robert Sheehan, Poppy Delevingne, Aisling Franciosi, and Sebastian Roché also joined the cast and that Samantha Colley, T. R. Knight, Seth Gabel, and Johnny Flynn were returning from season one in new roles.

==== Season 3 ====
On October 3, 2019, Cynthia Erivo was cast to play Aretha Franklin.

==== Season 4 ====
In September 2022, the cast was announced, with Kelvin Harrison Jr. and Aaron Pierre set to star as Martin Luther King Jr. and Malcolm X respectively, while Weruche Opia was cast as Coretta Scott King and Jayme Lawson as Betty Shabazz. In November, Ron Cephas Jones, Gary Carr and Hubert Point-Du Jour were added to the main cast for the season, with Lennie James, LisaGay Hamilton, Ashley Romans, Donal Logue and Griffin Matthews joining in recurring roles. Jalyn Hall was cast as a younger Martin Luther King Jr. in December.

=== Filming ===
Principal photography for season one took place in mid-2016 in Prague. Filming for season two began in November 2017 in Málaga and was expected to take place for over five months in various cities around the world, including Barcelona, Paris, and Budapest. Filming for the third season was set to commence in November 2019, for an early-2020 release. In March 2020, the production was shelved due to the COVID-19 pandemic. The series resumed production on October 1, 2020.

=== Music ===
Most of Franklin's music in season three was recorded by Erivo. However, the producers were unable to obtain the rights to use Franklin's biggest songs, "Respect" and "(You Make Me Feel Like) A Natural Woman".

== Reception ==
=== Critical reception ===
==== Season 1 ====
The first season received mostly positive reviews. On review aggregator website Rotten Tomatoes, the series has an approval rating of 84%, based on 31 reviews. The website's critical consensus reads, "Buoyed by a superb performance from Geoffrey Rush, Genius is a compelling origin story of one of history's most renowned scientists." On Metacritic, the season had a score of 65 out of 100, based on 20 reviews, indicating "generally favorable reviews".

Science columnist Dennis Overbye of The New York Times described the series as a "tense binge-worthy psychological thriller full of political and romantic melodrama." Overbye further noted that Einstein himself, writing to his sister, wrote, "If everybody lived a life like mine, there would be no need for novels." According to Hillary Busis of Vanity Fair, the film shows, "... Einstein at work ... peers into the über-genius's tumultuous love life (monogamy, he believes, is "not natural") ... his fraught emigration to the United States ...". Busis quotes producer Ron Howard: "When you move past his scientific contributions, Albert's life story—what his youth was like, who his friends were, who his enemies were, his tumultuous love life—is a story people don't know ... I think audiences are going to be riveted as we tell this ambitious and revealing human story behind Einstein's scientific brilliance."

==== Season 2 ====
The second season received mixed reviews, but garnered praise for its star, Antonio Banderas. Rotten Tomatoes gave an approval rating of 57%, based on 23 reviews. Its critical consensus reads: "An impressive performance from Antonio Banderas rescues Genius: Picasso from condensed melodrama." On Metacritic, the season had a score of 52 out of 100, based on 10 reviews, indicating "mixed or average reviews".

==== Season 3 ====
The third season received mainly positive reviews. Rotten Tomatoes gave an approval rating of 71% based on 34 reviews. The critical consensus reads: "Cynthia Erivo captures the spirit of the singular singer with poise and passion - if only Aretha's writing were as strong as her performance." On Metacritic, the season had a score of 67 out of 100, based on 10 reviews, indicating "generally favorable reviews".

===== Reaction from Franklin's family =====
Despite positive reception of season 3, Aretha Franklin's family never reacted kindly to the season, claiming they "weren't consulted in any part of the production, despite the crew's insistence that they worked with Franklin's estate".

==== Season 4 ====
The fourth season received mainly positive reviews. Rotten Tomatoes gave an approval rating of 75% based on 12 reviews. The critical consensus reads: "Sporting a good pair of starring performances, Genius' fourth season can't quite capture the legacies of its two civil rights icons but delivers a sturdy recreation of their personal lives."

=== Accolades ===
Year	Award	Category	Nominee(s)	Result	Ref.
2017	Primetime Emmy Awards	Outstanding Limited Series	Genius	Nominated	
2017	Primetime Emmy Awards	Outstanding Lead Actor in a Limited Series or Movie	Geoffrey Rush	Nominated	
2017	Primetime Emmy Awards	Outstanding Directing for a Limited Series, Movie, or Dramatic Special	Ron Howard	Nominated	
2017	Primetime Emmy Awards	Outstanding Hairstyling for a Limited Series or Movie	Tash Lees, Fae Hammond, Adela Robova, Alex Rouse	Nominated	
2017	Primetime Emmy Awards	Outstanding Main Title Theme Music	Hans Zimmer and Lorne Balfe	Nominated	
2017	Primetime Emmy Awards	Outstanding Makeup for a Limited Series or Movie (Non-Prosthetic)	Davina Lamont	Nominated	
2017	Primetime Emmy Awards	Outstanding Period/Fantasy Costumes for a Series, Limited Series, or Movie	Sonu Mishra, Martina Hejlova, Petia Krckova	Nominated	
2017	Primetime Emmy Awards	Outstanding Sound Editing for a Limited Series, Movie, or Special	Daniel Pagan, Erich Gann, Arielle McGrail, Bill Bell, Nicholas Fitzgerald, Tim Chilton, Jill Sanders	Nominated	
2017	Primetime Emmy Awards	Outstanding Sound Mixing for a Limited Series or Movie	Bob Bronow, Mark Hensley, Petr Forejt	Nominated	
2017	Primetime Emmy Awards	Outstanding Special Visual Effects in a Supporting Role	Eric Durst, Lenka Líkařová, Viktor Muller, Marek Ruth, Tomáš Kalhous, Lukáš Herrmann, Pavel Kolář, Petr Hastík, Vit Komrzý	Nominated	
2017	Hollywood Music in Media Awards	Main Title Theme – TV Show/Limited Series	Hans Zimmer and Lorne Balfe	Nominated	
2018	Golden Globe Awards	Best Actor – Miniseries or Television Film	Geoffrey Rush	Nominated	
2018	Screen Actors Guild Awards	Outstanding Performance by a Male Actor in a Television Movie or Limited Series	Geoffrey Rush	Nominated	
2018	American Society of Cinematographers Awards	Outstanding Achievement in Cinematography in Television Movie, Miniseries or Pilot	Mathias Herndl (for "Chapter One")	Won	
2018	Primetime Emmy Awards	Outstanding Limited Series	Genius: Picasso	Nominated	
2018	Primetime Emmy Awards	Outstanding Lead Actor in a Limited Series or Movie	Antonio Banderas	Nominated	
2018	Primetime Emmy Awards	Outstanding Cinematography for a Limited Series or Movie	Mathias Herndl (for "Chapter One")	Won	
2018	Primetime Emmy Awards	Outstanding Hairstyling for a Limited Series or Movie	Kate Starr, Alex Rouse, Judit Halasz, Janosne Kajtar	Nominated	
2018	Primetime Emmy Awards	Outstanding Makeup for a Limited Series or Movie (Non-Prosthetic)	Davina Lamont, Hayden Bloomfield, Szandra Biro, Szilvia Homolya	Nominated	
2018	Primetime Emmy Awards	Outstanding Period Costumes	Sonu Mishra, Eudald Magari, Balazs Labancz (for "Chapter One")	Nominated	
2018	Primetime Emmy Awards	Outstanding Sound Mixing for a Limited Series or Movie	Bob Bronow, Mark Hensley, Tamás Csaba (for "Chapter One")	Won	
2019	Screen Actors Guild Awards	Outstanding Performance by a Male Actor in a Miniseries or Television Movie	Antonio Banderas	Nominated	
2021	Hollywood Critics Association TV Awards	Best Actress in a Limited Series, Anthology Series or Television Movie	Cynthia Erivo	Nominated	
2021	Hollywood Critics Association TV Awards	Best Supporting Actor in a Limited Series, Anthology Series or Television Movie	Courtney B. Vance	Nominated	
2021	Black Reel Awards	Outstanding Actress, TV Movie/Limited Series	Cynthia Erivo	Nominated	
2021	Black Reel Awards	Outstanding Supporting Actor, TV Movie/Limited Series	Courtney B. Vance	Nominated	
2021	Primetime Emmy Awards	Outstanding Lead Actress in a Limited or Anthology Series or Movie	Cynthia Erivo	Nominated	
2021	Primetime Creative Arts Emmy Awards	Outstanding Choreography for Scripted Programming	Dondraico Johnson (Routines: "Jump" / "Satisfaction" / "See Saw")	Nominated	
2021	Primetime Creative Arts Emmy Awards	Outstanding Sound Mixing for a Limited or Anthology Series or Movie	Dan Brennan, Ken Hahn and Jay Meagher (for "Respect")	Nominated	
2021	ReFrame Stamp	IMDbPro Top 200 Scripted TV Recipients	Genius: Aretha	Won	
2022	Make-Up Artists and Hair Stylists Guild Awards	Best Period and/or Character Hair Styling	Louisa V. Anthony, Tracey Moss, Victor Paz	Won	
2022	Golden Globe Awards	Best Actress – Miniseries or Television Film	Cynthia Erivo	Nominated	
2022	NAACP Image Awards	Outstanding Television Movie, Limited-Series or Dramatic Special	Genius: Aretha	Nominated	
2022	NAACP Image Awards	Outstanding Directing in a Drama Series	Anthony Hemingway (for "Respect")	Nominated	
2022	NAACP Image Awards	Outstanding Actress in a Television Movie, Limited-Series or Dramatic Special	Cynthia Erivo	Nominated	
2022	NAACP Image Awards	Outstanding Supporting Actor in a Television Movie, Limited-Series or Dramatic Special	Courtney B. Vance	Won	
2022	NAACP Image Awards	Outstanding Supporting Actress in a Television Movie, Limited-Series or Dramatic Special	Pauletta Washington	Nominated	
2022	Screen Actors Guild Awards	Outstanding Performance by a Female Actor in a Miniseries or Television Movie	Cynthia Erivo	Nominated	
2022	Satellite Awards	Best Actress – Miniseries or Television Film	Cynthia Erivo	Nominated	
2022	Critics' Choice Television Awards	Best Actress in a Movie/Miniseries	Cynthia Erivo	Nominated	
2022	Critics' Choice Television Awards	Best Supporting Actor in a Movie/Miniseries	Courtney B. Vance	Nominated	
2024	Black Reel Awards	Outstanding Television Movie or Limited Series	Genius: MLK/X	Nominated	
2024	Black Reel Awards	Outstanding Lead Performance in a TV Movie/Limited Series	Kelvin Harrison Jr.	Nominated	
2024	Black Reel Awards	Outstanding Lead Performance in a TV Movie/Limited Series	Aaron Pierre	Nominated	
2024	Black Reel Awards	Outstanding Supporting Performance in a TV Movie/Limited Series	Ron Cephas Jones	Nominated	
2024	Black Reel Awards	Outstanding Directing in a TV Movie or Limited Series	Channing Godfrey Peoples (for "Graduation")	Won	
2024	Black Reel Awards	Outstanding Writing in a TV Movie or Limited Series	Sigrid Gilmer (for "Matriarchs")	Won	
2024	Black Reel Awards	Outstanding Writing in a TV Movie or Limited Series	Jeff Stetson (for "Graduation")	Nominated	
2024	Black Reel Awards	Outstanding Musical Score	Terence Blanchard	Won	
2024	Black Reel Awards	Outstanding Music Supervision	Amani K. Smith	Nominated	
2024	Black Reel Awards	Outstanding Original Song	"Change the World" ( Written and performed by Aloe Blacc and Blu)	Won	
2024	Black Reel Awards	Outstanding Cinematography	Joe Jody Williams	Nominated	
2024	Black Reel Awards	Outstanding Editing	Libya El-Amin	Won	
2024	Black Reel Awards	Outstanding Costume Design	Mercedes Cook	Won	
2024	Black Reel Awards	Outstanding Makeup & Hairstyling	Jeremy Dell and Jessi Dean	Won	
2025	NAACP Image Awards	Outstanding Limited Television (Series, Special or Movie)	Genius: MLK/X	Nominated	
2025	NAACP Image Awards	Outstanding Directing in a Drama Series	Marta Cunningham (for "Protect Us")	Nominated	
2025	NAACP Image Awards	Outstanding Directing in a Drama Series	Marta Cunningham (for "Who We Are")	Nominated	
2025	NAACP Image Awards	Outstanding Actor in a Limited Television (Series, Special or Movie)	Kelvin Harrison Jr.	Nominated	
2025	NAACP Image Awards	Outstanding Supporting Actor in a Limited Television (Series, Special or Movie)	Ron Cephas Jones	Nominated	
2025	NAACP Image Awards	Outstanding Supporting Actress in a Limited Television (Series, Special or Movie)	Jayme Lawson	Nominated	
2025	NAACP Image Awards	Outstanding Soundtrack/Compilation Album	Genius: MLK/X (Songs from the Original Series)	Nominated	
2025	Critics' Choice Television Awards	Best Supporting Actor in a Limited Series or Movie Made for Television	Ron Cephas Jones	Nominated	

== See also ==
- Albert Einstein House
- Einstein family
- The Einstein Theory of Relativity
- Historical Museum of Bern
- History of gravitational theory
- Political views of Albert Einstein
- Religious and philosophical views of Albert Einstein
- Special relativity
