= Xavier Smalls =

American actor (born 1997)

- Born: November 7, 1997 (age 28); Los Angeles, California, U.S.
- Education: Sacramento City College; California State University, Sacramento
- Occupation: Actor
- Years active: 2024–present
- Known for: Beauty in Black

Xavier Smalls (born November 7, 1997) is an American actor. He is known for his role as Angel in the Netflix series, Beauty in Black.

== Early life and background ==
Smalls was born in Los Angeles, California, US on November 7, 1997. He is originally from Sacramento, US. He attended Sacramento State University where he majored in biology and minored in chemistry, and then business and real estate before proceeding to Sacramento City College, where he studied theater acting. He furthered his acting career at William Esper Studio in New York City. He played a role in the short film, Shelf Life. In 2023, he worked part time at Arden Fair.

== Career ==
In 2026, Smalls faced public backlash after a video circulated online in which he described homosexuality as an "abomination". The remarks were widely criticized by LGBTQ+ advocacy groups and on social media.

Smalls later issued a public apology, stating that his comments did not reflect his intentions and expressing regret for any offense caused.

== Personal life ==
Smalls proposed to makeup artist Vanessa Martinez in August 2023. They had their wedding on December 7, 2024 in Mexico. The couple have a daughter.

== Filmography ==
=== Television ===
- Beauty in Black (2024–2026)
- Madea's Destination Wedding (2025), as Zavier

=== Short films ===
- Shelf Life (2024)
- Picture Perfect (2025)

Theater

- Pipeline (Celebration Arts)
- She Kills Monsters
