= Taja V. Simpson =

American actress and singer

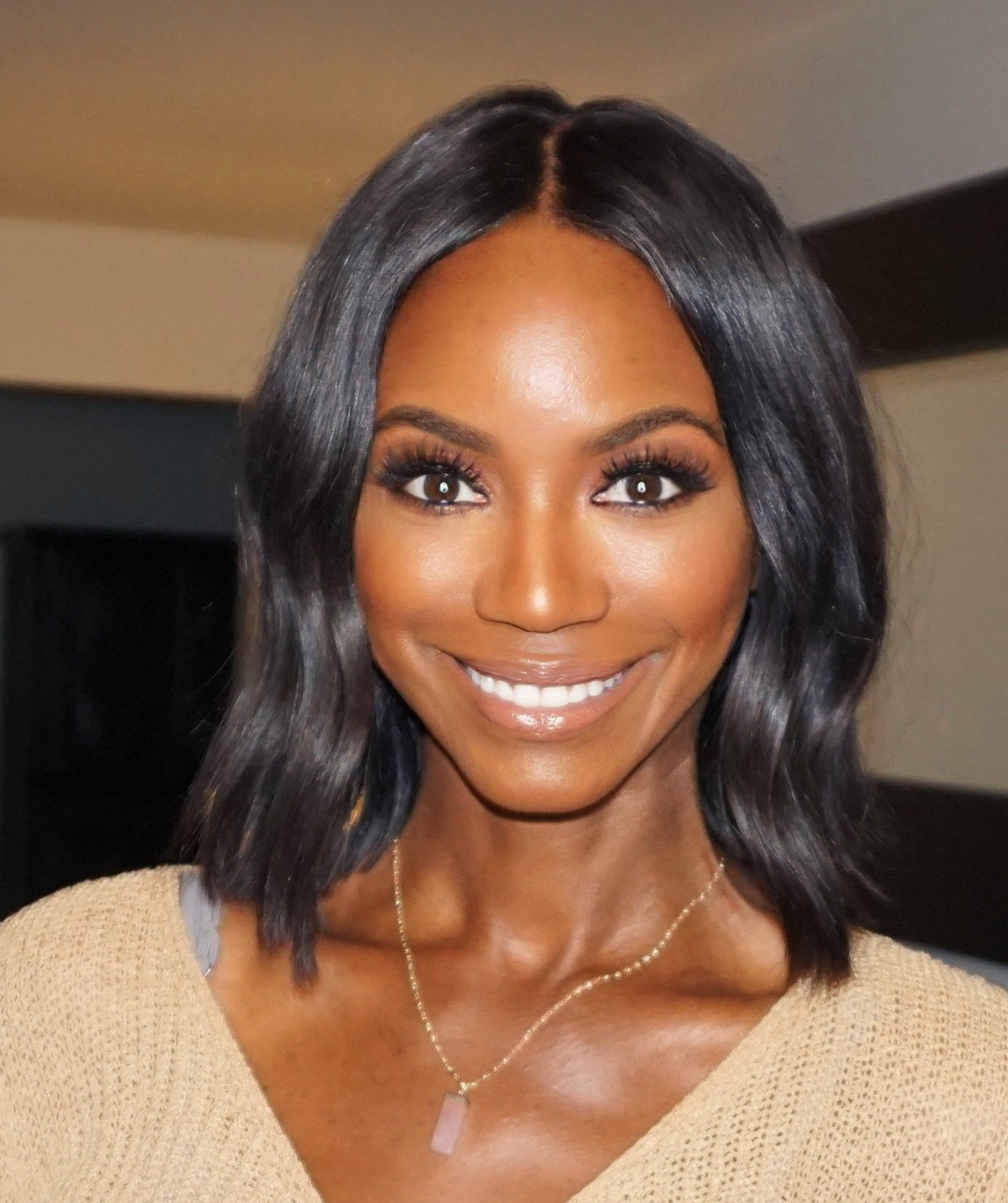
- Simpson in 2021
- Born: Lake Charles, Louisiana, U. S.
- Occupation: Actress
- Years active: 2004–present
- Known for: Actress, Director, Writer, Keynote Speaker, Entrepreneur
- Website: www.tajavsimpson.com

Taja V. Simpson is an American actress, known for her role as Priscilla Owen in the BET prime time soap opera, The Oval.

== Life and career ==
Simpson was born and raised in Lake Charles, Louisiana. She is of west African descent. She graduated from LaGrange High School and later received a degree in Mass Communications from McNeese State University. After moving to Los Angeles, she began her career appearing in episodes of television shows including Greek, NCIS: Los Angeles and Grey's Anatomy. From 2012 to 2014, Simpson had a recurring role as Adele in the CBS daytime soap opera, The Bold and the Beautiful. At that time, Simpson also appeared in a number of independent movies, and in 2017 starred in the horror-comedy film Boo 2! A Madea Halloween directed by Tyler Perry. In 2019, she played a leading role and produced the independent romantic comedy film My Online Valentine.

In 2019, Simpson began starring in the BET prime time soap opera, The Oval created by Tyler Perry. Her other television credits include NCIS, Tales, Lethal Weapon, and a recurring roles in the Urban Movie Channel soap opera A House Divided and The CW sports drama All American.

== Filmography ==
=== Film ===
Year	Title	Role	Notes
2005	Their Eyes Were Watching God	Wife of New Family	TV movie
2007	Cordially Invited	Latina Beasley	
2008	How 2 Build a Rapper	Professional Stylist #1	
2008	Black Inside: The Remington Wallace Burnett Story	Yolanda	Short
2009	Karma Bitch	Tyra	Short
2013	Love and Football	Victoria Miles	
2013	Relentless	Reporter	Short
2013	White Crack Bastard	Gina	
2015	Gladiator Recharge	News Reporter	TV movie
2016	Sharia	Rachel	
2017	The Preacher's Son	Shawna	
2017	Intercept	Chloe	Short
2017	Baker's Man	Theresa Stevens	
2017	Boo 2! A Madea Halloween	Debrah Simmons	
2018	Wally Got Wasted	Rachel Kane	
2018	Sojourn	Keema	Short
2019	My Online Valentine	Cozi	
2019	London Mitchell's Christmas	Chantal Kennard	
2020	All for Nikki	Carla Lakeman	
2020	Lola	Lola	
2020	Kiss Me for Christmas	Jada	
2021	Baby Money	Heidi	
2021	Fourth Grade	Lisa	
2021	The Right Mom	Ellen Graham	
2023	Lola 2	Lola	
2025	Madea's Destination Wedding	Debrah	
2025	#WorstChristmasEver	Harmony Davis	

=== Television ===
Year	Title	Role	Notes
2004	All About the Andersons	Parent	Episode: "Get Out of Dodge... Ball" & "Face the Music"
2007	Cane	Assistant	Episode: "The Exile"
2008	Greek	Waitress	Episode: "Highway to the Discomfort Zone" & "Crush Landing"
2008	The Ex List	Beach Girl	Episode: "Do You Love Me, Do You Surfer... Boy"
2009	NCIS: Los Angeles	Female Receptionist	Episode: "Random on Purpose"
2012	Awake	Public Affairs Officier	Episode: "Guilty"
2012	The Shop	Jacqueline	Recurring cast
2012–14	The Bold and the Beautiful	Adele	Regular Cast
2013	Shadow Love	Dana	Recurring cast: season 2
2013	Grey's Anatomy	Samantha Calder	Episode: "I Bet It Stung"
2014	Intelligence	Lobbyist	Episode: "The Rescue"
2014	The Thundermans	Customer	Episode: "Phoebe's a Clone Now"
2014	Mystery Girls	Mrs. Warner	Episode: "Death Becomes Her"
2014	Real Husbands of Hollywood	Woman #1	Episode: "Bad Sport"
2014	Benched	Reporter	Episode: "A New Development"
2015	The Soul Man	Trina	Episode: "Wife of a Preacherman"
2016	K.C. Undercover	Agent	Episode: "Brainwashed"
2016	What If a Woman	Angela	Episode: "Communication Is the Key"
2016	NCIS	Misha Rose	Episode: "Dead Letter"
2017	Tales	Police Woman Weaver	Episode: "F*ck the Police"
2018	Lethal Weapon	Toya	Episode: "Ruthless"
2019	Raven's Home	Mrs. Mutesa	Episode: "Diss Track"
2019–25	The Oval	Priscilla Owens	Main cast
2020	All American	Tina Hicks	Episode: "The Art of Peer Pressure" & "Stakes Is High"
2020–23	A House Divided	Jupiter	Main cast: seasons 1-5
2021	Insecure	Cheyenne	Episode: "Reunited, Okay?!"
2024	Hightown	Janelle	4 eposodes
2025	Found	Eileen	Episode: "Eileen"
