= Julian Horton =

American actor (born 1991)

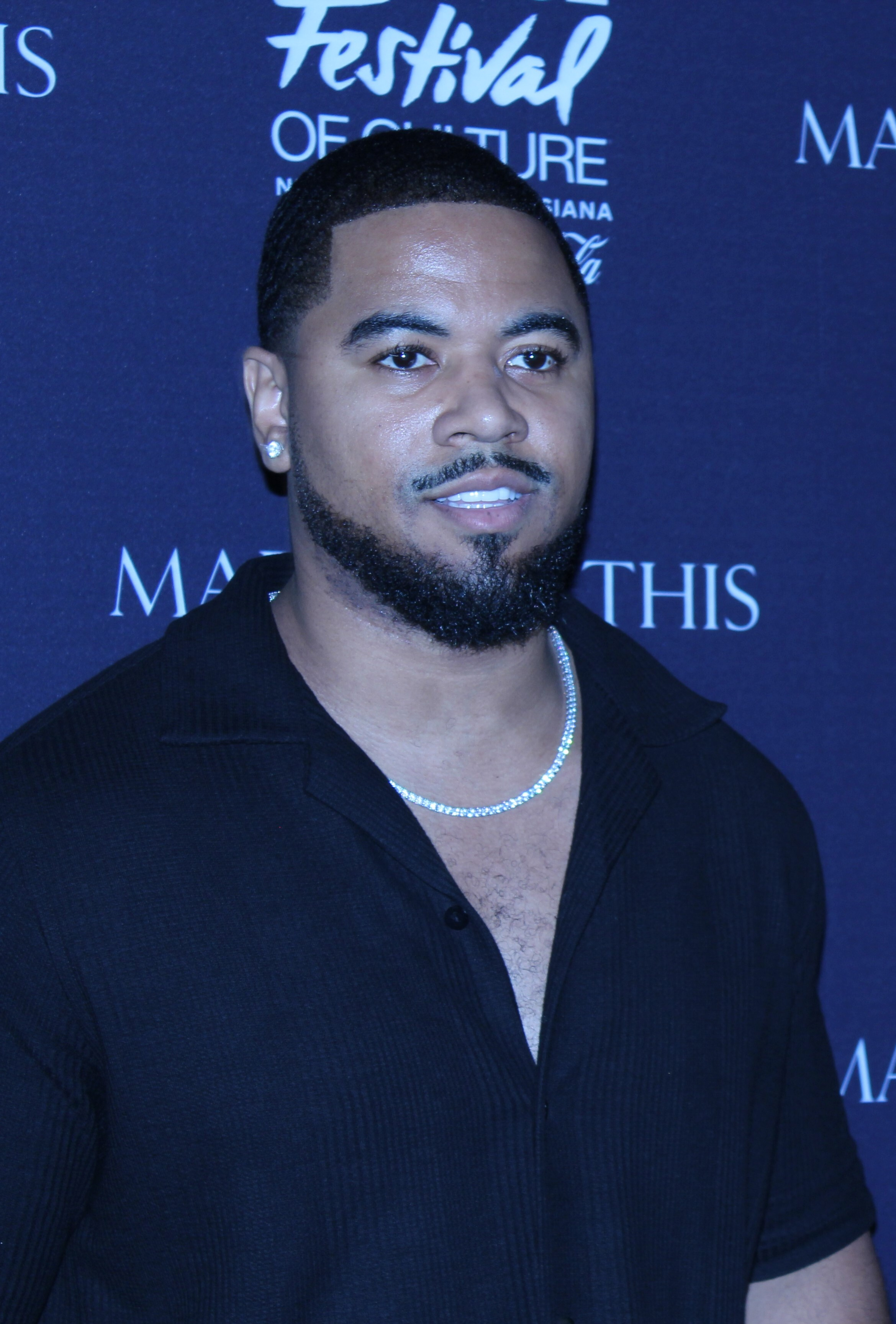
- EssenceFest 2025 in July.
- Born: December 12, 1991 (age 34); Philadelphia, Pennsylvania
- Occupation: Actor
- Years active: 2011–present
- Relatives: Donald Faison (cousin)

Julian Horton (born December 12, 1991) is an American actor and former football player. He is best known for his role as Roy Bellarie in Tyler Perry's Netflix series Beauty in Black (2024). Horton transitioned from a career in sports to acting, earning recognition for his performances in film and television.

== Early life and education ==
Julian Horton was born in Philadelphia, Pennsylvania and raised in Atlanta, Georgia. He attended Greater Atlanta Christian School in Norcross, Georgia and later played college football as a wide receiver for the Arkansas Razorbacks.

== Life and career ==
After his senior season, Horton pursued a professional football career, signing with the Tennessee Titans in May 2010 before being waived in August after playing in one preseason game. Horton transitioned to acting in 2018, making his film debut in Amazon Prime's The House Invictus. His early work included guest appearances on shows such as Legacies on the CW and Bruh on BET. In 2021, Horton made his theater debut with National Champions, starring alongside JK Simmons and Stephan James. In 2022, Horton appeared alongside Neal McDonough and J Alphonse Nicholson in Black Spartans. In 2024, Horton gained significant recognition for his portrayal of Roy Bellarie in Tyler Perry's first Netflix series Beauty in Black. Horton is also the first cousin of actor Donald Faison.

== Filmography ==
=== Film ===
Year	Title	Role	Notes
2018	Addiction	Brandon	Short
2019	Closure	Ryan	
2020	The House Invictus	Barry	
2020	The Benefit List	Bobby	
2021	Strictly for the Streets: Vol 1	Scooter	
2021	National Champions	Orlando Bishop	
2021	Strictly for the Streets: vol. 2	Bryant Bo Smith	
2022	ToxiCity	TJ	
2023	The Re-Education of Molly Singer	Bouncer	
2023	On the Run with Love	Freddie Cole, Producer	
2024	Colored Tags	Trey	Short
2024	Release	Julius	
2025	Legends of the Highway	Harold Newton	
TBD	Black Spartans	Gene Washington	
TBD	North of Hollywood	Daniel Anderson	
TBD	Left One Alive	Til	

=== Television ===
Year	Title	Role	Notes
2018	Takeout	Bravo	
2019	Legacies	Cocky Vampire	Episode: "I'll Tell You a Story"
2019	Homicide Hunter	Wade Douglas	Episode: "No Good Deed"
2020	Fatal Attraction	Russell	Episode: "Web of Seduction"
2020	Bruh	Orlando	2 episodes
2020	Loose AF	Davis	6 episodes
2021	First Family	Jacori	8 episodes
2020-2021	NoHo: A North Hollywood Story	Daniel Anderson	7 episodes
2022	Tough Love: Atlanta	Drew	10 episodes
2023	Ruined	Jayce	TV movie
2024-	Beauty in Black	Roy	40 episodes
