= Sam Sokolow =

American film and television producer

- Born: July 3, 1969 (age 57); Manhattan, New York, U.S.
- Education: Boston University (1991)
- Occupations: Film and television producer President of EUE/Sokolow; President of Sammy Nice Inc; Professor of Practice at Clemson University
- Years active: 1991–present
- Spouse: Julia Fowler (m. 2003)
- Relatives: Alec Sokolow (brother)

Sam Sokolow (born July 3, 1969) is an American film and television producer and President of Sammy Nice Inc., a production company based in South Carolina, New York and Los Angeles, CA. He is also currently a Professor of Practice of film production at Clemson University.

== Early life ==
Samuel Wolfe Sokolow was born and raised in Manhattan, New York City in 1969. His father Mel Sokolow (1933–1992) and his mother Diane were both producers on various film and television programs in the 1970s. His older sister, Betsy, is a publicist and producer. His older brother, Alec Sokolow, is an Oscar-nominated screenwriter. He spent a significant portion of his childhood socializing with his parents’ actor and producer friends. He credits these early years with his decision to be a producer.

Sokolow attended Boston University largely because that was the only school he could find that allowed him to begin a hands-on film curriculum as a freshman. He graduated with a Communications degree in 1991. Though he bounced around between various jobs in media, even working as a journalist and crime reporter for a time, Sokolow eventually decided to enter the film industry full-time in 1997.

== Career ==
Sokolow started working on commercials as a producer at different ad agencies before moving onto feature film work. In the late ‘90s, he and Rob Lobl partnered to create SokoLobl Entertainment. The two wrote, produced, and directed an independent film called The Definite Maybe (later retitled No Money Down). They self-distributed the film over the internet. At the time, this practice was unheard of. As a result, Sokolow and Lobl were credited as poster boys of online film distribution in the independent film scene, with Sokolow saying "I don't need Hollywood anymore to have 35 million people take a look." Shortly thereafter, Sokolow moved to Los Angeles to focus more on television production. During this period, he sold and executive produced TV series for MTV, BET, CMT, GSN, E!, OWN and Oxygen.

In 2010, Sokolow and Jeffrey Cooney, the son of EUE/Screen Gems CEO George Cooney, co-founded EUE/Sokolow. This new subsidiary focuses on independent television production by attaching talent to projects before pitching them to larger studios. Their first major project was producing an adaptation of Walter Isaacson's biography of Albert Einstein, Einstein: His Life and Universe. Sokolow and Cooney pitched the project to Ron Howard. Coincidentally, Howard had been looking to make an Einstein project for years. With Howard's backing, EUE/Sokolow teamed with Imagine Entertainment to create National Geographic's first scripted series, Genius, with Geoffrey Rush in the role of Einstein. The series was a critical success, earning 10 Emmy nominations, including Sokolow's first nomination for Outstanding Limited Series. Though the original intent was to create a limited series based only on Einstein's life, the success of the project caused National Geographic to commission the series as an ongoing anthology with a different subject each season. Season 2 followed Pablo Picasso, played by Antonio Banderas, and earned 8 Emmy nominations, including Sokolow's second nomination for Outstanding Limited Series. Season 3 depicted the life of Aretha Franklin. Season 4 depicted the lives of Dr. Martin Luther King Jr., played by Kelvin Harrison Jr., and Malcolm X, played by Aaron Pierre.

Besides Genius, Sokolow is currently working on a number of TV and film projects and developing a film written by his brother centered on the legacy of Chuck Taylor and Converse. Sokolow and his brother are co-directing a documentary feature film based on the bestselling book "Once A Giant" by Gary Myers.

Sokolow is currently a Professor of Practice in film production at Clemson University in South Carolina, where he creates curriculum focused on hands-on experiential learning. He recently created a film production course at Clemson that resulted in the production of the micro-budget feature film Student Film: The Movie.

== Personal life ==
Sokolow married actress, screenwriter, director, and published author Julia Fowler in 2003. They currently reside in Greenville, South Carolina.

Sokolow's older brother Alec Sokolow is an Oscar-nominated screenwriter known for Toy Story.
