= Beauty in Black =

American television series

- Genre: Drama; Soap opera
- Created by: Tyler Perry
- Written by: Tyler Perry
- Directed by: Tyler Perry
- Starring: Taylor Polidore Williams; Crystle Stewart; Ricco Ross; Amber Reign Smith; Xavier Smalls; Ts Madison; Julian Horton; Steven G. Norfleet; Richard Lawson; George Middlebrook; Terrell Carter; Shannon Wallace; Charles Malik Whitfield; Debbi Morgan
- Country of origin: United States
- Original language: English
- No. of seasons: 3
- No. of episodes: 40

Production
- Executive producers: Tyler Perry; Angi Bones; Tony Strickland
- Camera setup: Single-camera
- Running time: 42–58 minutes
- Production company: Tyler Perry Studios

Original release
- Network: Netflix
- Release: October 24, 2024 – present

Beauty in Black is an American drama television series created, written and directed by Tyler Perry. It is currently in its third season. The series stars Crystle Stewart and Taylor Polidore Williams as two women leading very different lives. The first part of season one premiered on Netflix on October 24, 2024, with the second part premiering on March 6, 2025. The first part of the second season premiered on September 11, 2025. The second part of second season premiered on March 19, 2026. Ahead of the second part of second season premiere, in December 2025, the series was renewed for a third season, and for a fourth season in July 2026.

== Premise ==
Two young women from opposite sides of the tracks cross paths—as one tries to survive her day to day as a stripper who is stuck hostage with a violent pimp, the other runs a successful hair care (relaxer) company with dysfunctional in-laws and is trapped in a loveless marriage.

== Cast and characters ==
=== Main ===
- Taylor Polidore Williams as Kimmie Bellarie
- Crystle Stewart as Mallory Bellarie
- Ricco Ross as Horace Bellarie
- Amber Reign Smith as Rain
- Xavier Smalls as Angel
- Julian Horton as Roy Bellarie
- Steven G. Norfleet as Charles Bellarie
- Richard Lawson as Norman Bellarie
- Terrell Carter as Varney
- Shannon Wallace as Calvin (season 1)
- Charles Malik Whitfield as Jules Salton
- Debbi Morgan as Olivia Bellarie
- Bryan Tanaka as Officer Alex (season 2; recurring season 1)

=== Recurring ===
- D'Kia Anderson as Leslie (season 1)
- Joy Rovaris as Gillian (season 1)
- Tamera Kissen as Body (season 1)
- Ursula O. Robinson as Delinda (season 1)
- Ashley Elizabeth Versher as Lena (season 1)
- Phylicia Lloyd as Yolanda
- Bailey Tippen as Sylvie
- George Middlebrook as Officer Trackson
- Ts Madison as Daga
- Deangelo Howard Jr. as Salvo (season 1)
- Theon Walls as Debo (season 1)
- Antoine Williams as Frank (season 1)
- Jimmie Cummings as Harold
- Kajanee Smith as Felicia
- Colin Richard Allen as Dustin
- Ann Marie Gideon as Dr. Justly
- Greg Clarkson as James
- Derek S. Orr as Daniel Lakland (season 2)
- Philemon Chambers as Andy (season 2)
- Rodrigo Aburto as Evan (season 2)
- Randall J. Bacon as Whitman (season 2)
- Aria Castillo as Adeline (season 2)
- Alfred Smith as Giovanni (season 2)

== Episodes ==
Season	Episodes		Originally released
1	16	8	October 24, 2024
1	16	8	March 6, 2025
2	16	8	September 11, 2025
2	16	8	March 19, 2026
3	8		August 27, 2026

=== Season 1 (2024–25) ===
No. overall	No. in season	Title	Directed by	Written by	Original release date
Part 1
1	1	"Make It Rain"	Tyler Perry	Tyler Perry	October 24, 2024
To escape her harsh life, a young stripper, Kimmie, tries to apply for hair scholarship for the Beauty in Black hair school founded by the Bellarie family.
2	2	"A Dance with Daddy"	Tyler Perry	Tyler Perry	October 24, 2024
Following Rain's botched BBL, Kimmie defies Jules and Body takes her to the hospital and makes a pact with a powerful client at the club. Meanwhile, following the accident on the private road, Mallory and Roy try their best to present a united front as a chaotic string of events begin to occur.
3	3	"The Aftermath"	Tyler Perry	Tyler Perry	October 24, 2024
Kimmie begins to suffer the fallout of her decision. Tension between Norman and the other Bellaires begin to mount as he begins hunting for answers for the hit and run.
4	4	"A Family Affair"	Tyler Perry	Tyler Perry	October 24, 2024
Olivia plays a power move to protect her sons. Angel comes with a dangerous proposal to Kimmie. As the lawsuit against the company begins to become public, Mallory considers a game plan.
5	5	"Unraveling Threads"	Tyler Perry	Tyler Perry	October 24, 2024
After getting his rock, Angel and Kimmie choose different plan. Jules pulls the family's strings. Faced with a difficult choice, Norman's suspicions grow.
6	6	"Bang Bang"	Tyler Perry	Tyler Perry	October 24, 2024
Roy's ego reaches new heights as Mallory hunts for his "other woman." Kimmie and Angel look for a way out. Norman's grief takes a bloody turn.
7	7	"Even Playing Field"	Tyler Perry	Tyler Perry	October 24, 2024
Fed up with Roy, Mallory takes matters into her own hands. As Norman digs for the truth, a familiar face comes into focus. Kimmie and Angel make moves.
8	8	"Killing Karma"	Tyler Perry	Tyler Perry	October 24, 2024
Schemes and secrets come full circle as Horace connects the dots behind the robbery, Mallory asserts her dominance and Body sets a plan in motion which pushes Kimmie to her breaking point.
Part 2
9	9	"Blind Rage"	Tyler Perry	Tyler Perry	March 6, 2025
After learning of Body and Delinda's latest stunt, Kimmie begins a life-or-death mission for her sister, Sylvie. Meanwhile, The Bellaries mourn the loss of one of their own that has them scheming for the truth.
10	10	"Power Struggle"	Tyler Perry	Tyler Perry	March 6, 2025
Jules begins his hunt for Kimmie as she continues to cause a mess. Horace begins to focus on Norman's criminal deeds. Kimmie's mission leads to a hostile reunion with her estranged mother.
11	11	"Up Against the Wall"	Tyler Perry	Tyler Perry	March 6, 2025
The lawsuit continues to worsen for Mallory as she does damage control. Horace begins to resolve the recent chaos. Kimmie's search for her sister continues to take levels of dangerous acts.
12	12	"Hot Seat"	Tyler Perry	Tyler Perry	March 6, 2025
Jules initiates a manhunt for Kimmie. Angel plays a dangerous game to stay alive. Due to miscommunication, Varney finds himself in the crossfire of another scandal.
13	13	"By Any Means"	Tyler Perry	Tyler Perry	March 6, 2025
Horace makes a promising deal to Kimmie. Meanwhile, Angel makes a shocking discovery at the club. An accident has sent another Bellarie to the hospital.
14	14	"Wild Ride"	Tyler Perry	Tyler Perry	March 6, 2025
The noose begins to tighten on Roy as Mallory traces Roy's infidelity back to the strip club. Kimmie finds herself further in the hole as she continues her search for her sister.
15	15	"The Lion's Den"	Tyler Perry	Tyler Perry	March 6, 2025
Horace has a plan set in motion that has the family on high alert. Kimmie makes the news. Angel and Rain move on to the next steps.
16	16	"Now Make It Thunder"	Tyler Perry	Tyler Perry	March 6, 2025
Secrets, lies, deception makes tables turn as Horace offers Kimmie a life altering decision, which forces the rest of the family to scramble to save the empire.

=== Season 2 (2025–26) ===
No. overall	No. in season	Title	Directed by	Written by	Original release date
Part 1
17	1	"Crowned in Beauty"	Tyler Perry	Tyler Perry	September 11, 2025
Following the shocking revelation of Kimmie and Horace's new marriage, shockwaves ripple throughout the family. Mallory begins to seek information elsewhere. Varney has reached his limit with Charles. Roy makes a shocking discovery. Meanwhile, Angel finds himself in deeper trouble.
18	2	"When the Tables Turn"	Tyler Perry	Tyler Perry	September 11, 2025
While Sylvie and Rain become comfortable in their new life, Kimmie continues to have doubts. After discovering Varney's secret, Roy decides to use it for his own benefit. Mallory reaches out to Felicia. Jules has a intense meeting with Angel. Horace makes a fatal mistake.
19	3	"Blaze of Beauty"	Tyler Perry	Tyler Perry	September 11, 2025
Norman decides to cut some loose ends. Mallory and Varney decide to have dinner that goes terribly awry. Meanwhile, out on the town, Rain overhears some devastating news.
20	4	"The Next Chapter"	Tyler Perry	Tyler Perry	September 11, 2025
Horace considers a new alternative to his treatment. Someone who was close to Delinda begins to Sniff around the club. After learning about Angel's death, Kimmie begins to plan an escape plan, but is confronted with another bombshell. Following the disastrous dinner, Varney, Mallory and Olivia have an intense drive home.
21	5	"Hunter's Prey"	Tyler Perry	Tyler Perry	September 11, 2025
As Kimmie tries to give Horace another chance, Rain returns back to the club to commit a good deed. Charles finds a surprise waiting for him at home. Roy finds a new girl to give his attention.
22	6	"The Enemy of My Enemy"	Tyler Perry	Tyler Perry	September 11, 2025
Rain and Alex engage in a lethal altercation. Norman uncovers Olivia's financial secret. Horace and Roy engage in a difficult conversation. As Charles continues to enjoy the celebration, his new guest initiates a dangerous plan.
23	7	"Gloves Off"	Tyler Perry	Tyler Perry	September 11, 2025
Following his deadly robbery, Charles tries to reach out for help. Rain makes a catastrophic error when thinking Sylvie is in trouble. Kimmie makes herself known at work. Angel becomes comfortable in Horace's life. Roy quickly develops feelings for Felicia.
24	8	"Hold the Pleasantries"	Tyler Perry	Tyler Perry	September 11, 2025
Rain continues to spiral as she attempts to find a solution to her problem. Meanwhile, Varney and Charles find themselves in a hazardous situation. An explosive board meeting takes place, putting Olivia and Norman in deep trouble. Meanwhile, Jules gives Kimmie a warning.
Part 2
25	9	"Toxic Vibes"	Tyler Perry	Tyler Perry	March 19, 2026
A violent wake-up call leaves Charles shaken and desperate. Kimmie attempts to control the narrative. Felicia and Mallory strike a bargain. Varney makes a friend.
26	10	"Playing for Keeps"	Tyler Perry	Tyler Perry	March 19, 2026
A tense dinner puts Kimmie and Sylvie's bond to the test. Olivia proves that loyalty has a price. Charles tries to assume an alibi. Angel's new lifestyle fuels his worst instincts.
27	11	"Fed Up"	Tyler Perry	Tyler Perry	March 19, 2026
Kimmie has an intense phone call with Jules. As Roy continues to spiral out of control, Mallory reaches her breaking point. Olivia's debts catch up to her with a warning. Varney uncovers shocking information. Angel begins to take his life in the fast lane, but it quickly catches up to him.
28	12	"Flames of Fury"	Tyler Perry	Tyler Perry	March 19, 2026
The war between Roy and Mallory intensifies. Varney and Evan begin to grow close. Charles uncovers shocking information about not only Olivia's injury, but also his recent robbery. Angel's time in the fast lane lands him in a deadly situation.
29	13	"Boom!"	Tyler Perry	Tyler Perry	March 19, 2026
Following the house fire, Roy and Mallory continue to hurt one another. Kimmy races against time to obtain protection for Sylvie and Rain. Sylvie finds herself in more danger. Angel finds himself on a tightrope with Horace. Rain gets a big score. Norman learns devastating information about his wife's death.
30	14	"Your Turn is Coming"	Tyler Perry	Tyler Perry	March 19, 2026
After learning that Mallory was behind his wife's fatal hit and run, Norman begins to go off the deep end. Charles reaches out to Horace for help. Varney finds himself in a deadly car chase. Olivia tries to save herself yet again.
31	15	"The Power of Us"	Tyler Perry	Tyler Perry	March 19, 2026
As Kimmie, Rain and Mallory team, Roy tries to find a way to save his shares and tries to rely on help from Charles. As Glen succumbs to his injuries, Jules begins to unravel and starts to seek revenge.
32	16	"Queen's Gambit"	Tyler Perry	Tyler Perry	March 19, 2026
After being kidnapped by Jules, Sylvie makes an ultimate decision. After uncovering a treasure trove of bombshells, Mallory and Kimmie face off the rest of the Bellaries during an emergency board meeting where secrets are exposed, loyalties are tested and has surprises they never expected. Angel begins to seek legal advice.

=== Season 3 (2026) ===
No. overall	No. in season	Title	Directed by	Written by	Original release date
Part 1
33	1	"King In Play"	Tyler Perry	Tyler Perry	August 27, 2026
In the midst aftermath of the FBI raid, an opportunity of immunity pits Norman, Olivia, Roy Jules against one another. Horace and Kimmy's arrangement is called into question. Charles is still in debt with Gina. Varney find himself on thin ice around Horace. Now owner, Rain makes a serious change of the club that ruffles some feathers. Angel tries to figure out where he stands with Horace. Alex is thrown into the Bellarie mess. Mallory's problems continue to haunt her.
34	2	"Gotcha"	Tyler Perry	Tyler Perry	August 27, 2026
Roy tries to play a self serving angle. Rain learns that the club still has ties to the past. Angel tries his best to get back in Horace's good graces. The pressure and debt drives Charles to a deadly act. Olivia's lies soon begin to crumble around her. Kimmy and Horace have awkwardness between them. As Mallory tries to manage fallout, Norman uses some shocking information as leverage.
33	3	"Throne of Blood"	Tyler Perry	Tyler Perry	August 27, 2026
As Olivia realizes her problem will still find her, Norman decides to call in a favor. As Kimmy tries to ignites thing with Horace, she gets unexpected results. An emergency forces Varney back to Charlie. Roy begins to hit rock bottom. Mallory's past actions begins to catch up with her. Alex finds himself hyper vigilent after his fight. Rain's newfound power begins to get to her.
34	4	"A Tender Betrayal"	Tyler Perry	Tyler Perry	August 27, 2026
Now teamed up Charles and Varney makes a play to extract information from Olivia. Tensions boil over at the mansion when Sylvie commits an unforgivable act. Horace receives a shocking update regarding his cancer. As his withdrawal begins to intensifies, Roy becomes bait for Norman. Angel finds himself on edge with Horace.
35	5	"The Devil In Details"	Tyler Perry	Tyler Perry	August 27, 2026
As Horace receives a medical update that has him on high alert. Charles and Varney makes a risky deal. Forced back to humble beginnings, Angel and Rain's tempers get the best of one another. Kimmy continues to be taunted by her mother.
36	6	"A Pack Of Wolves"	Tyler Perry	Tyler Perry	August 27, 2026
As Horace confronts his enemies, Rain's newfound power starts to catch up with her and the club. Angel scrambles to keep his standing with Horace. Kimmie and Mallory find themselves targeted by surrounding enemies, leaving them desperately unable to contain the bloodshed. Following the botched drop off, Charles and Varney find themselves still indebted with to Olivia and her cleanup crew as deadly threats begins to close in one the family mansion.
37	7	"The Looking Glass"	Tyler Perry	Tyler Perry	August 27, 2026
The feud within the family begins to reach new heights as Mallory finds herself in a deadly standoff with Norman. Meanwhile, after learning his dark secret, Horace leads Charles and Varney behind closed doors with information of his own. A massive piece of information about his son's death has Jules searching for his own freedom. Meanwhile, an urgent warning has both Kimmie and Rain on edge.
38	8	"Dancing In The Rain"	Tyler Perry	Tyler Perry	August 27, 2026
The night takes a deadly turn as the past begins to catch up with each and everyone in the family. Alex and Traction's feud reaches another level of chaos.

== Production ==
In October 2023, Tyler Perry signed multi-year first-look deal with Netflix. On February 12, 2024, it was reported that Netflix has ordered 16-episode drama series Beauty in Black, his first series for streaming service under the deal. In April 2024, the cast was announced with Taylor Polidore Williams and Crystle Stewart as leads, Amber Reign Smith, Ricco Ross, Debbi Morgan, Richard Lawson, Steven G. Norfleet, Julian Horton, and Terrell Carter as series regulars. Shannon Wallace, Bryan Tanaka, Joy Rovaris, Xavier Smalls, Charles Malik Whitfield, Tamera "Tee" Kissen, Ursula O. Robinson, Ashley Versher and George Middlebrook were cast in recurring roles.

In March 2025, Netflix renewed the show for a second season following the release of Season 1 Part 2. The series gained significant popularity, with Part 1 spending four weeks in Netflix's Top 10 and reaching No. 1 in 28 countries during its second week. Season 2 has been released in two parts.

In December 2025, ahead of the second part of second season premiere, Netflix renewed the series for a third season.

In July 2026, ahead of the release of season three, it was announced the series was renewed for a fourth and final season.

== Reception ==
=== Critical response ===
The first season received negative reviews from television critics. Television critic Andrew Lawrence from The Guardian gave it one star of five writing: "The wildly successful mogul's first drama series for the streamer is a disaster with one-dimensional characters and haphazard plotting". Joel Keller from the Decider also gave it a negative review writing: "Tyler Perry's Beauty In Black is about a subtle as a slap in the face, which is something we're surprised we didn't see in the grim, abuse-filled first episode" but noted Crystle Stewart's performance as Mallory Bellarie.

=== Audience viewership ===
Beauty in Black debuted as Netflix's fourth-most-watched series with 5.6 million views in its first four days of availability. On the second week, it rose to the top of the streamer's TV chart for October 28 to November 3, hitting 8.7 million views.
