= Samantha Colley =

English actress (born 1987)

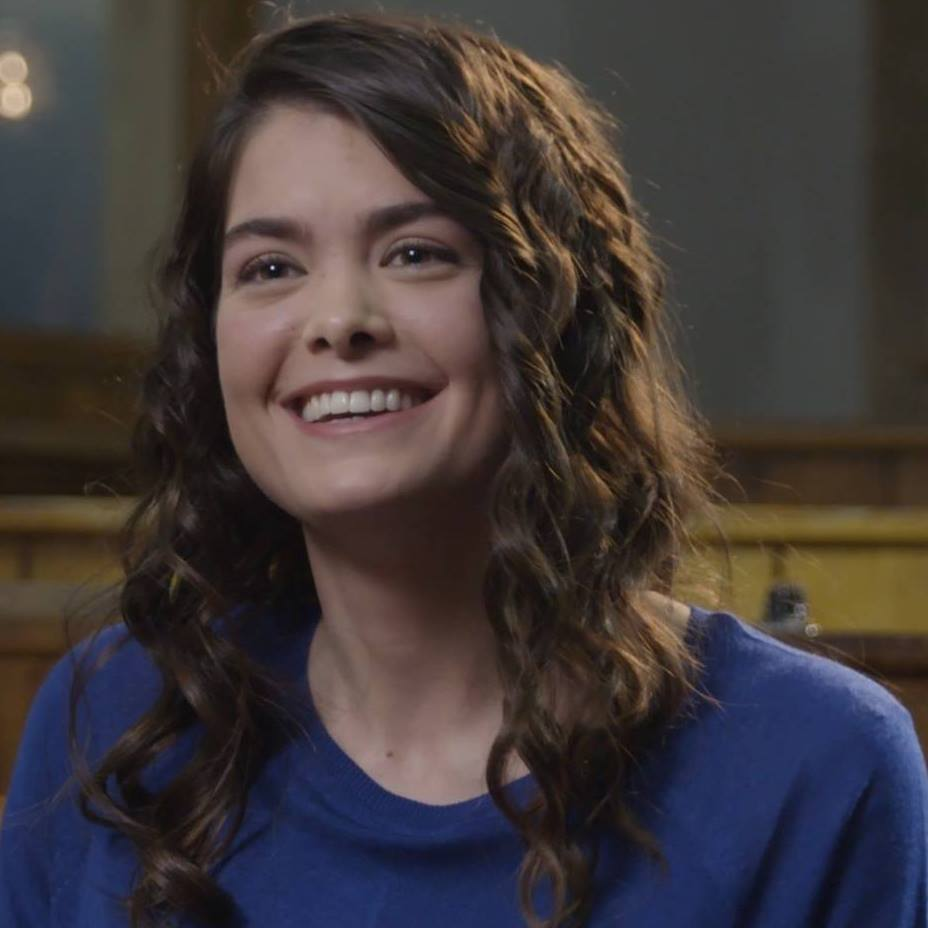
- Colley in 2015
- Born: September 1987 (age 38–39); Canterbury, Kent, England
- Education: Oxford School of Drama
- Occupation: Actress

Samantha Colley (born September 1987) is an English actress having had roles in various theatre, television and film productions, including playing the lover of both Albert Einstein and Pablo Picasso in the National Geographic TV series Genius.

== Education ==
Colley studied at the Oxford School of Drama where, as a student, she performed in productions of Tolstoy's Anna Karenina and Shakespeare's The Taming of the Shrew.

== Career ==
In 2014, Colley made her stage debut in The Crucible by Arthur Miller, at The Old Vic theatre in London. Colley was nominated for "Best Supporting Actress in a Play" at the 2015 WhatsOnStage Awards for her performance as Abigail Williams, but lost out to Rachelle Ann Go.

In 2017, Colley starred as Mileva Marić in Genius, the ten-part television series for National Geographic and Fox 21 about the life and work of Albert Einstein. In 2018, Colley reappeared in the second season of Genius, playing Dora Maar the lover of Picasso, who was played by Antonio Banderas.

== Theatre ==
Year	Title	Role	Production	Notes
2014	The Crucible by Arthur Miller	Abigail Williams	The Old Vic	
2014/2015	Far Away by Caryl Churchill	Joan	The Young Vic	
2015	Klippies by Jessica Siân	Yolandi	Southwark Playhouse	

== Filmography ==
=== Film ===
Year	Title	Role	Production	Notes
2015	Tuesday	Julia	-	short film
2018	Solo: A Star Wars Story	Ottilie	Lucasfilm	film

=== Television ===
Year	Title	Role	Production	Notes
2015	Endeavour	Nina Lorimer	ITV	1 Episode
2016/2017	Victoria	Eliza Skerrett	ITV	11 Episodes
2017	Genius	Mileva Marić	National Geographic	Season 1
2018	Genius	Dora Maar	National Geographic	Season 2
2019	Britannia	Andra	Sky Atlantic	
2021	Invasion	Jeep driver	Apple TV+	Season 1, epi 7
2023	Archie	Barbara Harris	ITV	Episode 4

== Awards and nominations ==
Year	Award	Category	Nominated work	Result	Ref.
2015	15th WhatsOnStage Awards	Best Supporting Actress in a Play	The Crucible	Nominated	
2018	20th Women's Image Network Awards	Actress MFT Movie / Mini-Series	Genius	Nominated	
2019	21st Women's Image Network Awards	Actress in a Drama	Genius	Nominated	
