= Steven G. Norfleet =

American actor

- Born: Detroit, Michigan, U.S
- Occupation: Actor
- Years active: 2010–present
- Spouse: Anthony Hemingway (m. 2019)

Steven G. Norfleet is an American actor. He played recurring roles in the television miniseries Watchmen (2019) and Genius: Aretha (2021). In 2024, Norfleet starred in the Netflix soap opera, Beauty in Black.

== Life and career ==
Norfleet was born in Detroit, Michigan and graduated from the Morehouse College in Atlanta, Georgia. While living in Atlanta, Norfleet began working as a dancer and in 2010 made his screen debut playing a dancer in the dance drama film, Stomp the Yard: Homecoming. As an actor, he guest-starred in the television series Shameless, Underground, Being Mary Jane, Chicago P.D., Dynasty and Good Girls. In 2019 he had a recurring role as O. B. Williams in the HBO series, Watchmen.

In 2021, Norfleet played Cecil Franklin, the brother of soul singer Aretha Franklin in the National Geographic biographical series, Genius: Aretha. The following year he guest-starred in the AMC gothic horror series Interview with the Vampire. In 2023 he joined the cast of BET+ soap opera Ruthless by Tyler Perry. The following year, Perry cast him as one of leads in his Netflix series, Beauty in Black.

== Personal life ==
Norfleet is openly gay. He and television director Anthony Hemingway started dating in 2014, after being introduced through a mutual friend. They got engaged in June 2018 and married in September 2019.

== Filmography ==
=== Film ===
Year	Title	Role	Notes
2010	Stomp the Yard: Homecoming	Mu Gamma Zi Stepper	
2016	Shameless	Cop	Episode: "Sleep No More"
2017	Underground	Mack	Episode: "Auld Acquaintance"
2017	Shooter	Kill Team Leader	Episode: "Across the Rio Grande"
2017	Being Mary Jane	Eriq	Episode: "Feeling Seen"
2018	Chicago P.D.	Shabazz	Episode: "Allegiance"
2018	One Dollar	Man in Pajamas	Episode: "Chelsea Wyler"
2019	Dynasty	Colin	Episode: "A Champagne Mood"
2019	Good Girls	Douglas	Episodes: "I'd Rather Be Crafting" and "Take Off Your Pants"
2019	Deadly Dispatch	Marcus	Television film
2019	Watchmen	O. B. Williams	Recurring role, 5 episodes
2020	Power	Officer Tirado	Episode: "Exactly How We Planned"
2021	Genius: Aretha	Cecil Franklin	Recurring role, 7 episodes
2022	Interview with the Vampire	Paul de Pointe du Lac	Episode: "In Throes of Increasing Wonder..."
2023—2024	Ruthless	Lewis	Series regular, 22 episodes
2024—present	Beauty in Black	Charles Bellarie	Series regular, 32 episodes
