= Jeffrey Cooney =

- Born: 1958 (age 67–68)
- Died: February 12, 2018 (aged 59–60)
- Education: College of the Holy Cross (BA)
- Occupation: Producer/Director
- Years active: 1981 - 2018
- Title: Creative Director
- Parents: George Cooney (father); Cynthia Cooney (mother)

Jeffrey Cooney (born 1958) was an American television producer and director. He was the co-founder and creative director of EUE/Sokolow Entertainment, which developed the script for the National Geographic television show, Genius. Cooney, along with his brother Chris, owned EUE/Screen Gems Studios, which operates one of the largest sound stages east of Hollywood in Wilmington, North Carolina.

== Early life and education ==
Cooney was born in 1958. His mother, Cynthia Cooney, was a design consultant. His father, George Cooney, was the CEO of EUE/Screen Gems Ltd. He was raised in Bronxville, New York with his three siblings. At the age of 7, he began acting in television commercials, eventually appearing in an advertisement for Cream of Wheat.

Cooney graduated from Bronxville High School, where he played quarterback for the school's football team. After high school, he attended the College of the Holy Cross in Worcester, Massachusetts, where he played wide receiver for the Holy Cross Crusaders. Cooney graduated from Holy Cross in 1980 with a Bachelor of Arts in English literature.

== Career ==
Following his graduation from Holy Cross, Cooney formed the commercial production company LCL Productions with Ron Leyser, Danny Levinson and Bill Seiz in 1981. He directed his first commercial for the Mitsubishi Company and eventually directed commercials for New York Life, Procter & Gamble and others. After 4 years, he joined EUE/Screen Gems as a principal and director. In 1990, he formed Jeffrey Cooney Films where he directed commercials for clients including Kodak and General Mills. Since 2000, Cooney has served as the executive vice president of creative affairs for First Look Studios, Inc.

In 2001, Cooney directed the documentary The Game of Their Lives which documented an under served high school's involvement in the "Play it Smart" program. The film was produced for the National Football Foundation and won a prize for the best educational documentary at the Chicago Film Festival in 2004. Cooney also is credited with creating a pro-bono tourism commercial for Washington, D.C. that featured a bipartisan group of politicians singing a George and Ira Gershwin song in 2002. That same year, he was an executive producer for the movie Skins. While continuing to produce television commercials and working with athletes including Dale Earnhardt Jr. and Shaquille O'Neal, Cooney developed an interest in Albert Einstein after reading the Walter Isaacson biography Einstein: His Life and Universe. He eventually acquired the rights to the book with the intention of creating a feature film.

In 2010, Cooney partnered with Sam Sokolow to create EUE/Sokolow Entertainment an independent production company. In 2017, the company produced the Genius TV series for National Geographic based on the Einstein biography Cooney had previously acquired the rights to. After the success of the first season, National Geographic announced that it would pick up the Genius series for a second season and that EUE/Sokolow would again be an executive producer for the show.

== Personal life ==
Cooney was active with the JDRF and held board memberships at Destination College, the National Football Foundation and the College Football Hall of Fame. He died on February 12, 2018.
