= Red Tails =

2012 war film directed by Anthony Hemingway

- Theatrical release poster
- Directed by: Anthony Hemingway
- Screenplay by: John Ridley; Aaron McGruder
- Story by: John Ridley
- Based on: Red Tails, Black Wings: The Men of America's Black Air Force; 1997 book by John B. Holway
- Produced by: Rick McCallum; Chas. Floyd Johnson
- Starring: Nate Parker; David Oyelowo; Ne-Yo; Elijah Kelley; Cuba Gooding Jr.; Terrence Howard
- Cinematography: John Aronson
- Edited by: Michael O'Halloran; Ben Burtt
- Music by: Terence Blanchard
- Production company: Lucasfilm Ltd.
- Distributed by: 20th Century Fox
- Release dates: January 11, 2012 (New York City); January 20, 2012 (United States)
- Running time: 125 minutes
- Country: United States
- Languages: English; German
- Budget: $58 million
- Box office: $50.4 million

Red Tails is a 2012 American war film directed by Anthony Hemingway in his feature directorial debut, and starring Terrence Howard and Cuba Gooding Jr. The film is about the Tuskegee Airmen, a group of African-American United States Army Air Forces (USAAF) servicemen based at Ramitelli Airfield in southern Italy during World War II. The characters in the film are fictional, although based on real individuals. The film was produced by Lucasfilm Ltd. and released by 20th Century Fox, and would be the last film Lucasfilm released before being purchased by The Walt Disney Company nine months later. This was Gooding's first theatrically released film in five years since his starring role in 2007's Daddy Day Camp.

John Ridley wrote the screenplay. Additional material was shot the following year with executive producer George Lucas as director and Aaron McGruder as writer of the reshoots. It was filmed in March and July 2009. Red Tails was a personal project for Lucas, one that he had originally conceived in 1988. It is the first Lucasfilm production since the 1994 film Radioland Murders that is not associated with the Indiana Jones or Star Wars franchises. Terrence Howard had previously portrayed a Tuskegee pilot in Hart's War (2002), and Cuba Gooding Jr. had previously starred in The Tuskegee Airmen (1995), an HBO made-for-television film about the same group of pilots.

== Plot ==
In 1944, as the air war over Europe enters a deadly phase with increasing losses of Allied bombers, the 332d Fighter Group (the Tuskegee Airmen), consisting of African-American USAAF fighter pilots, after enduring racism throughout their recruitment and training in the Tuskegee training program, are sent into combat in Italy. Flying worn-out Curtiss P-40 Warhawk aircraft and chafing at their ground attack role, the Tuskegee Airmen fear they may never fight the Luftwaffe. The tight-knit group of Captain Martin "Easy" Julian, 1st Lt. Joe "Lightning" Little, 2nd Lt. Ray "Ray Gun" Gannon, 2nd Lt. Andrew "Smokey" Salem, and 2nd Lt. Samuel "Joker" George, under the guidance of Major Emanuel Stance and Col. A.J. Bullard, face a white military bureaucracy still resistant to accepting black flyers as equals. (Note: An "aviator call sign" or "callsign" is a nickname given to a military pilot or other flight officer. With origins back to World War II, the call sign is a substitute for a name, and is used on name tags, aircraft and radio conversations to simplify communications and possibly mask the origin of the person from the enemy. The call sign was a source of contention with "Junior" Gannon who wants others to call him "Ray Gun".)

Tension develops between Lightning, a hotheaded and reckless pilot, and Easy, an alcoholic prone to self-doubt. Lightning becomes infatuated with Sofia, an Italian woman, and starts a relationship. When Lightning punches a white man who uses a racial slur at a "whites only" officer's club, he is confined and reprimanded by Colonel Bullard. Opportunities for aerial combat finally materialize when the Tuskegee Airmen are ordered to support the Allied landings at Anzio, Italy. They battle Messerschmitt Bf 109 fighters led by a German ace pilot they nickname "Pretty Boy." When they damage Pretty Boy's plane and raze his airbase he is stunned to learn his adversaries are African-Americans. When Ray Gun's eyesight is impaired by anti-aircraft fire, Easy reluctantly allows him to continue flying.

Impressed with the Tuskegee Airmen's performance, the USAAF Bomber Command asks Bullard's group to escort Boeing B-17 Flying Fortress bombers because of unacceptably high casualties. Bullard accepts on the condition his unit be supplied with the new North American P-51 Mustangs. (Note: The Tuskegee Airmen initially were equipped with Curtiss P-40 Warhawks fighter-bomber aircraft; briefly with Bell P-39 Airacobras (March 1944); later with Republic P-47 Thunderbolts (June–July 1944); and finally the fighter group acquired the fighter aircraft with which they became most commonly associated, the North American P-51 Mustang (July 1944).) The tails of the aircraft are painted bright red and become the unofficial name of the outfit.

Noting the reckless aggression of previous escorts, Bullard orders his pilots to stay with the bombers at all times. Their first escort mission is a success, and the 332nd downs multiple Luftwaffe aircraft without the loss of a single bomber. Lightning even takes his chances to attack a Kriegsmarine destroyer before returning to base.

Attitudes against the Tuskegee Airmen begin to change as they earn the bomber crews' respect, though at a cost. Ray Gun is shot down and captured, and a seriously injured Deke is rescued from a crash-landing and medically discharged. Ray Gun is recruited by fellow POWs at Stalag 18 for their escape committee. Ray Gun and his group of POWs escape, but Ray Gun provides a distraction when the Germans detect them, allowing the others to escape. One of the escapees reaches the 332nd's base and informs them Ray Gun sacrificed his life for their freedom. Easy blames himself for Ray Gun's loss, and spirals deeper into alcoholism. Lightning promises Easy he will fly less recklessly as long as Easy remains sober, and Sofia agrees to marry him as long as he stays in Italy.

The Tuskegee Airmen are tasked with escorting the first American bombers to attack Berlin, though only on the first leg of the mission. When their relief never arrives, Easy orders the group to stay with the bombers into enemy airspace where Pretty Boy leads a flight of the revolutionary new Messerschmitt Me 262 jet fighters against them. Despite being outclassed, the Tuskegee Airmen shoot down several of the jets, then escort a damaged B-17 back to Allied airspace. Pretty Boy nearly shoots down Easy, but is shot down by Lightning who is seriously wounded in the dogfight and killed when his Mustang crashes.

Easy informs Sofia about Lightning's death, and overcomes his alcoholism. At Lightning's funeral, Ray Gun returns, having survived his escape from German captivity. The Tuskegee Airmen are awarded the Presidential Unit Citation in honor of their achievements.

== Cast ==
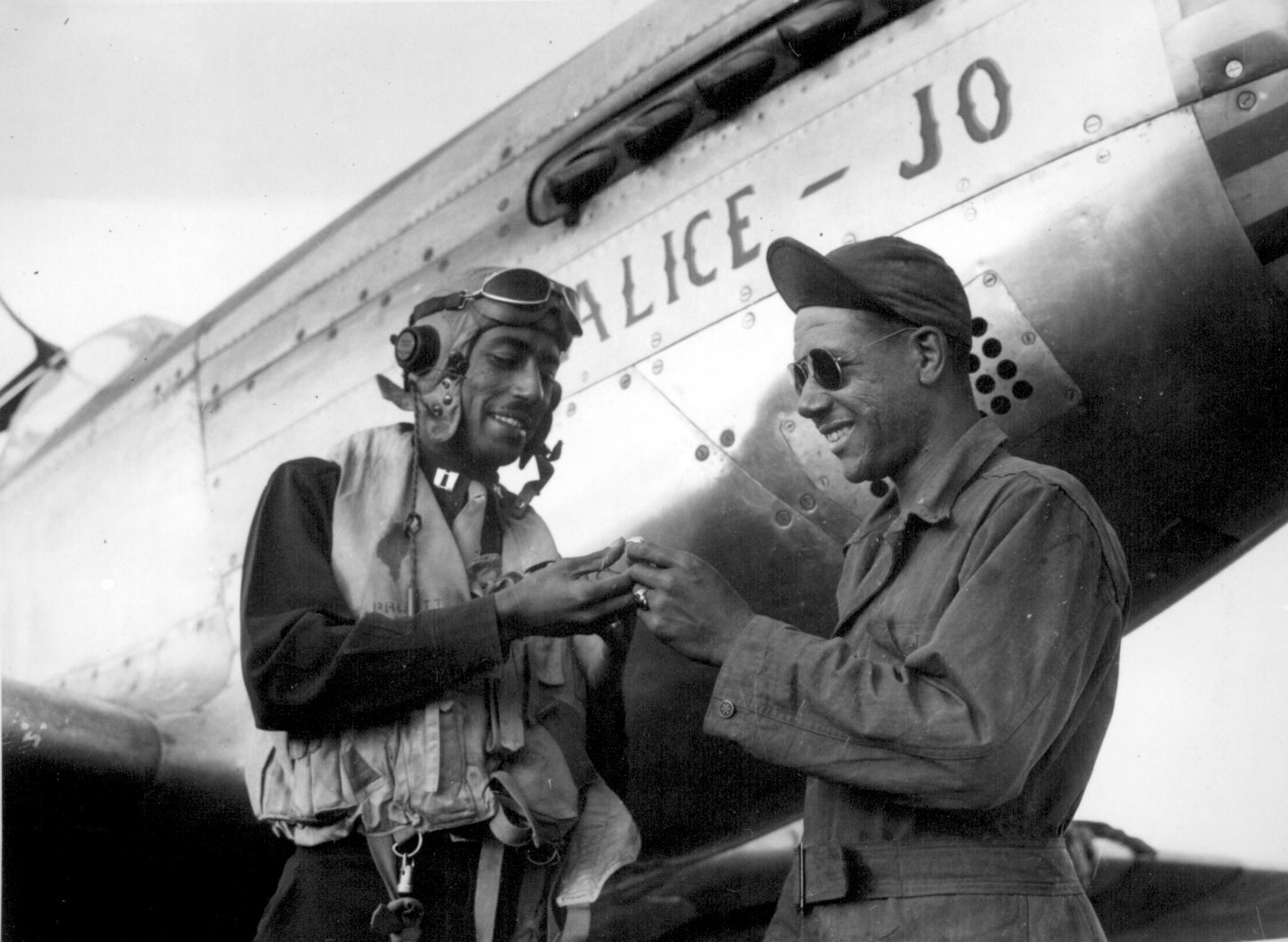
Tuskegee Airmen: Capt. Wendell O. Pruitt with his crew chief, S/Sgt. Samuel W. Jacobs, c. November 1944

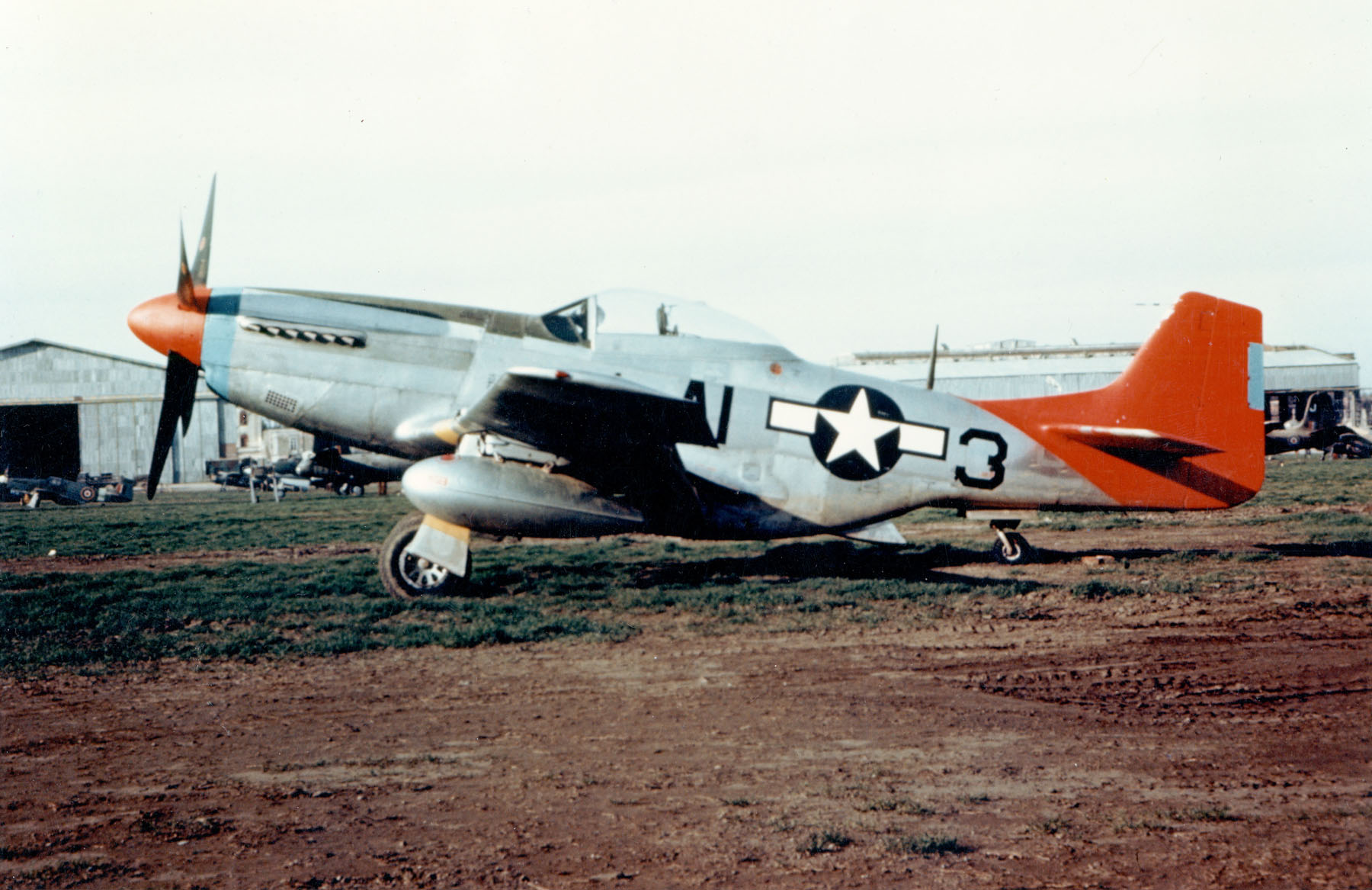
The Tuskegee Airmen's aircraft had distinctive markings that led to the name, "Red Tails." (Note: The red markings that distinguished the Tuskegee Airmen included red bands on the noses of P-51s as well as a red rudder; their P-51B and D Mustangs flew with similar color schemes, with red propeller spinners, yellow wing bands and all-red tail surfaces.)

- Terrence Howard as Col. A.J. Bullard
- Cuba Gooding Jr. as Major Emanuel Stance
- Nate Parker as Capt. Martin "Easy" Julian
- David Oyelowo as 1st Lt. Joe "Lightning" Little
- Tristan Wilds as 2nd Lt. Ray "Ray Gun" or "Junior" Gannon
- Ne-Yo as 2nd Lt. Andrew "Smokey" Salem
- Elijah Kelley as 2nd Lt. Samuel "Joker" George
- Marcus T. Paulk as 2nd Lt. David "The Deacon" Watkins
- Leslie Odom Jr. as Declan "Winky" Hall
- Michael B. Jordan as Flight Officer Maurice "Bumps" Wilson
- Method Man as Cpl. "Sticks"
- Bryan Cranston as Col. William Mortamus
- Kevin Phillips as 2nd Lt. Leon "Neon" Edwards
- Andre Royo as 1st Sgt. "Coffee" Coleman
- Lee Tergesen as Col. Jack Tomilson
- Gerald McRaney as Lieutenant General Luntz
- Daniela Ruah as Sofia
- Paul Fox as Capt. Miller
- Matthew Marsh as Brigadier General Hauser
- Lars van Riesen as "Pretty Boy" (the German antagonist pilot)
- Ryan Early as Captain Bryce
- Henry Garrett as Hart
- Robert Kazinsky as Chester Barnes
- Rick Otto as Flynt
- Josh Dallas as Ryan Fling
- Edwina Findley as "CeCe"
- Stacie Davis as Mae
- Aml Ameen as "Bag O'Bones"
- Rupert Penry-Jones as Brig. Gen. Campbell

== Production ==
When I first started working with George he told me about the story and the initial plan was to make this epic three- or four-hour movie. We wanted to start in the United States and show the full racism these guys had to go through, then go to the heroic story that we're telling now and then come back and do the beginning of the Civil Rights Movement. But it was just so unwieldy and also at that time, there was no way to have a roadshow three-hour movie in American cinemas. Every epic film had been a financial disaster, and we felt there just wasn't an audience we could get the film out to. Then we got heavily into Young Indiana Jones, which ran for three or four years, then the Star Wars Special Editions and the prequels, but throughout we did continue talking. However, once we finished Episode III we decided to go and meet people in the black community.

— Interview with Rick McCallum, June 9, 2012

George Lucas began developing Red Tails around 1988, after hearing of the Tuskegee Airmen from his friend George Hall, a photographer. At the time, the film was scheduled for release in 1992, with Kevin Sullivan writing the screenplay and Thomas Carter directing. Lucas originally conceived of the film as a long, detailed narrative similar to Lawrence of Arabia, and as a trilogy, but after multiple script drafts, he decided to focus on the combat portion of the story. He compared it to Tucker: The Man and His Dream as "a story too good to be true". In researching the film, Lucasfilm invited some of the surviving Tuskegee Airmen to Skywalker Ranch, where they were interviewed about their experiences during World War II. Lucasfilm was also given access to the original mission logbooks used by some of the pilots. A number of writers worked on the project until John Ridley was hired in 2007 to write the screenplay. Lucas held discussions with Samuel L. Jackson regarding Jackson possibly directing and acting in the film. Although Jackson praised the script, he did not commit to either role. Anthony Hemingway, a former production assistant for Lucas' The Young Indiana Jones Chronicles TV series, was ultimately chosen to direct in 2008.

Pre-production began in January 2009, with location scouting having taken place in June 2008 in Prague, Czech Republic, Italy and Croatia. Lucas invited storyboard artist David Russell (son of Tuskegee Airman James C. Russell) to design key aerial combat sequences. Production began in March 2009 with high-definition Sony F35 cameras used for principal photography, which took place in the Czech Republic, Italy, Croatia and England over a period from August to December. While shooting in the Czech Republic, the actors also underwent a "boot camp" program, during which they lived in similar conditions to the actual Tuskegee Airmen.

Harkening back to his early work on Star Wars where he had studied World War II aerial footage to create the space aerobatics performed by Rebel X-wings and TIE fighters, Lucas was familiar with World War II aerial combat. The Lucas template for photographing computer-generated imagery (CGI) dogfighting "involved lots of action, continuous motion, moving camera, streaks, loops and rolls, and all of the things aerial photography allows you to do in live action." Aerial scenes in Red Tails involved actors sitting in a gimbal-mounted cockpits (and mock-up fuselages and wings), in front of a green screen, rocked back and forth by production crew members. In order to achieve a realistic reaction, actors were flown in actual P-51 Mustangs at the Planes of Fame in Chino, California, to experience the forces involved in dogfighting. (Note: Surviving single-seat P-51 Mustangs often have been modified to incorporate a second seat behind the pilot.)

Editing began while the production was in Prague. Avid editing systems were used simultaneously in a Prague studio and at Lucasfilm. A vehicle was fitted with a "technical center" so that the production could quickly move between locations. Red Tails was the first film to use Barco's Auro-3D 11.1 surround sound system.

In March 2010, Lucas took over direction of reshoots, as Hemingway was busy working on episodes of the HBO series, Treme. The Boondocks creator Aaron McGruder was brought in late in production, after Hemingway's principal photography, to provide re-writes for the Lucas-directed reshoots.

In April 2009, Tuskegee Airman Lt. Col. Lee A. Archer, Jr. was appointed an advisor for Red Tails. He died in 2010 while the film was in post-production, and the final credits bear a tribute to him.

Lucas covered the cost of production with his own money, and provided a further US$35 million for distribution. In an interview on The Daily Show on January 9, 2012, Lucas stated that the long delay in the production of the film was because major film studios balked at financing and marketing a film with an "all-black" cast and "no major white roles." He went on to explain that studios receive "60% of their profit" from overseas, and the studios feel there is no market there for films with all-black casts. Red Tails is the last film Lucasfilm made independently before being acquired by The Walt Disney Company on October 30, 2012.

== Marketing ==
The film had a presence at 2011's New York Comic Con; Lucasfilm sponsored a panel featuring many of the cast and crew, as well as a P-51 flight simulator. The P-51 Mustang flown in Red Tails also became a free add-on for Microsoft Flight, as of 2012, and can be downloaded from Microsoft's Xbox LIVE Marketplace.

== Reception ==
Rotten Tomatoes, a review aggregator reports that 41% of 135 surveyed critics gave the film a positive review. The site's consensus reads: "Despite a worthy fact-based story and obvious good intentions, Red Tails suffers from one-dimensional characters, corny dialogue, and heaps of clichés." On Metacritic, the film also holds a score of 46 out of 100, based on 32 critics, indicating "mixed or average reviews". Audiences polled by CinemaScore gave the film an average grade of "A" on an A+ to F scale.

The main criticism was directed to the tone of the film; Stephen Holden in The New York Times review, noted, "In structure and tone, Red Tails proudly harks back to the 1940s and '50s, when good guys were good, and bad guys bad." In rebuttal, co-writer Aaron McGruder commented on the film's tone: "Some people are going to like this tonal choice and some people are going to say, 'Oh it should've been heavier and it should've been more dramatic.' But there's a version of this that doesn't have to be Saving Private Ryan. We can be Star Wars, as crazy as it is." Roger Ebert of the Chicago Sun-Times gave the film two-and-a-half stars out of four, stating, "Red Tails (is) entertaining. Audiences are likely to enjoy it. The scenes of aerial combat are skillfully done and exciting." In a similar vein, aviation historian Budd Davison, in agreement with fellow historian Barrett Tillman, although cognizant of the "Hollywood treatment", had a caution to aviation enthusiasts looking for a faithful reenactment of the Tuskegee legend, "... buy some popcorn, lean back and enjoy, this is Hollywood telling a story, not making a documentary. Save your guffaws until afterward with your friends."

Ina Diane Archer, daughter of Lee Archer (Tuskegee airman and advisor for Red Tails), in writing for Film Comment, criticizes the film's disconnect between aerial scenes and the rest of the film, saying, "One longs for more scenes between the ensemble on the ground, but the emphasis on aerial (and digital) technology leaves the characters without context. There's a particularly troubling absence of black women (but for a painting on Lightning's plane) who go unmentioned—no gal back home? no sisters, no Mamas?—nor do we ever see the African Americans who followed the squadron's adventures."

In the face of media criticism of the portrayals of the Tuskegee Airmen in Red Tails, a number of activists took to social media to protest against what was thought to be a racially tinged effort to denigrate the contribution of the wartime fighting unit. Beginning with statements to support the film made by surviving Tuskegee Airmen who had seen the film in previews, and spurred by the comments made by Lucas in a candid interview on The Daily Show where the producer openly discussed the difficulties of trying to get Red Tails made over the past 23 years, a Facebook campaign was started. In the Oakland, California premiere, two sold-out screenings were a testament to the success of the campaign. Effie Tesfahun, one of the organizers, explained, "When [Lucas] said Hollywood does not want to touch black films, it really hit me ... I thought we should get together and all go and support [this film]. Regardless of what Hollywood thinks, we all want to see positive messages of black people in the movies ... We need to speak, and speak loud, and speak with our dollars, because that's where people pay attention, when you start talking with your money," Tesfahun said. "We are sending a message that this is what we want."

Adolph Reed, professor of political science at the University of Pennsylvania, said the film "trivializes segregation in the military by reducing it to a matter of bad or outmoded attitudes. The ironic effect is significant understatement of both the obstacles the Tuskegee airmen faced and their actual accomplishments by rendering them as backdrop for a blackface, slapped-together remake of Top Gun".

== Awards ==
Red Tails received a nomination at the 2012 Teen Choice Awards for "Choice Action Movie", (Note: Red Tails star Ne-Yo was also nominated in the 2012 Choice Single by a Male Artist category for "Give Me Everything (Tonight)" by Pitbull, featuring Ne-Yo, Afrojack and Nayer.) and was also nominated at the 2012 BET Awards for "Best Movie".

Later, in February 2013, Red Tails won the NAACP Image Award in the categories of "Outstanding Motion Picture" and "Outstanding Independent Motion Picture" at the 44th NAACP Image Awards. In addition, George Lucas was honoured with the "Vanguard Award". The film was also nominated for "Outstanding Writing in a Motion Picture" and "Outstanding Directing in a Motion Picture", while Ne-Yo was nominated for "Outstanding Duo or Group".

== Historical accuracy ==
Red Tails portrays largely fictional events based on the exploits of the Tuskegee airmen, although many viewers were left with the impression that the film was entirely historically accurate. Through a series of three webinars, entitled: "Tuskegee Airman Webinars – 'Was the Movie Accurate'?" sponsored by the Commemorative Air Force's Red Tail Squadron, surviving Tuskegee Airmen Colonel Charles McGee and Colonel Harold Brown provided perspectives related to the film's interpretation. Although discussions as to use of equipment and dates were mentioned, three claims made in the film were the most contentious: the number of losses suffered by bomber crews under escort, the distinction that the group's encounters with Luftwaffe jet fighters were singular, and the overall record established by the Tuskegee Airmen.

According to period records, it was long believed that the Tuskegee Airmen did not lose a single bomber due to enemy fire, a statement made by a bomber pilot in the film. However, this claim has been proven inaccurate, and an Air Force report from 2006 showed that at least 25 bombers were lost to enemy fire. As depicted in the film's climactic scene, the Luftwaffe Me 262 interception of a Tuskegee Airmen escort mission did not result in the first victory over the vaunted jet fighters; this was credited to another U.S. unit much earlier in the war. (Note: On August 28, 1944, a pair of USAAF 78th FG P-47 Thunderbolts flown by Maj. J. Myers and Lt Manfred O. Croy shot down the first Me 262 (from 1./KG 51, flown by Ofw H. Lauer) near Brussels.) The film also states in the epilogue that the Tuskegee Airmen established one of the best fighter records in the U.S. Air Force. The film notes, correctly, that 96 Distinguished Flying Crosses were awarded to the unit and 66 Tuskegee Airmen were killed in action. Officially, however, the Tuskegee Airmen did not produce a single fighter pilot ace, although Lee Archer's record is still in dispute. (Note: Lee Archer had four confirmed victories and although involved in shooting down a Bf 109, the victory was allegedly given to another Tuskegee Airman.)

At the end of webinars, host Brad Lang, the CAF Red Tail Squadron Leader, described the interaction as important to reconciling the historical record with the Red Tails film's essentially dramatic retelling of the Tuskegee Airmen saga. Both colonels also agreed that the discussions were important to resolving the controversy over the film.

The movie has also been criticized for portraying the unit's commander as only having a desk job when the actual commander, Lt. Col. (later Gen.) Benjamin O. Davis Jr. flew many combat missions (because both black and white commanders needed such on-the-job training).

== Home media ==
Red Tails was released on DVD and Blu-ray/DVD combo, as well as via digital download, on May 22, 2012. It topped DVD and Blu-ray sale charts during its first week of release. The Blu-ray/DVD combo includes Double Victory, a companion documentary to the film that debuted on January 13, 2012, on H2. It details the full real-life story of the Tuskegee Airmen, and includes interviews with many of the surviving members. Additionally, both home video releases of the film are THX certified. The Blu-ray/DVD combo also includes several featurettes that focus on the film's cast and crew. The only bonus feature included on the regular DVD edition is a series of "highlights" from Double Victory.

== See also ==
- Fly, a 2009 play about the Tuskegee Airmen
- The Tuskegee Airmen, a 1995 HBO television movie on the Tuskegee Airmen
- List of black films of the 2010s
- Eugene Bullard, the first African-American military pilot, in whose honor the movie's Col. A.J. Bullard is named
- Red Tails (soundtrack)
