= Madea's Destination Wedding =

2025 film by Tyler Perry

- Release poster
- Directed by: Tyler Perry
- Written by: Tyler Perry
- Produced by: Tyler Perry; Yolanda T. Cochran; Angi Bones
- Starring: Tyler Perry; Cassi Davis Patton; David Mann; Tamela Mann; Taja V. Simpson; Diamond White; Jermaine Harris; Xavier Smalls
- Cinematography: Michael Watson
- Edited by: Larry Sexton
- Music by: Jongnic Bontemps
- Production company: Tyler Perry Studios
- Distributed by: Netflix
- Release date: July 11, 2025
- Running time: 104 minutes
- Country: United States
- Language: English

Madea's Destination Wedding is a 2025 American comedy film produced, written, and directed by Tyler Perry and his seventh film to be released by Netflix. Perry reprises his roles as Madea, Joe, and Brian, while the rest of the principal cast consists of Cassi Davis Patton, David Mann, Tamela Mann, Taja V. Simpson, Diamond White, Jermaine Harris, and Xavier Smalls. The film follows Madea and her extended family attending a destination wedding for her granddaughter Tiffany. However, conflicts surrounding the event arise. It is the thirteenth film in the Madea cinematic universe.

Madea's Destination Wedding was released on July 11, 2025, receiving negative reviews according to Rotten Tomatoes.

== Plot ==
Brian Simmons discovers that his daughter, Tiffany, has a boyfriend named Zavier (who goes by Z for short), a man he has never met, with only her, his wife Debrah, and his son BJ knowing him. They reveal that Tiffany and Zavier are getting married, with Debrah giving them her blessing. Brian sees Zavier as immature and a bad influence on his family, and tells of him to his aunt, Madea, along with her brother and his father, Joe. She proposes to Brian to come by the next night so they can learn more about the situation.

Back at the DA office, Brian is trying to find info on Zavier, but to no avail. He orders a thorough investigation into Zavier with the FBI. That night, Debrah, Tiffany, BJ, and Z come to Madea's house to inform them all that the wedding will be held abroad, specifically at the Atlantis Paradise Island in The Bahamas. Brian begrudgingly agrees to pay for the travel and wedding expenses, not wanting to look bad in front of the family.

Brian arranges Madea, Cora, Brown, and Joe to get their passports. Despite her reluctance due to her rampant criminal activity, Madea goes for the process and secures her passport. Once they arrive at the Bahamas, they go check in at the Atlantis Resort. After Madea, Cora, and Bam get settled in their rooms, the former expresses her suspicion of Debrah to Cora, who dismisses her.

Madea, Bam, and Cora meet with Debrah and Tiffany to show off the latter's wedding dress, where Madea brings to discussion her suspicions on whether the wedding is being forced ahead against Tiffany's will. The family reunites at a buffet and Brian is told before he joins the table that the investigation into Z led to nothing, so he decides to let the marriage proceed without objection. During a bachelor party Z holds, Brian sees him arguing with a woman, assuming an affair, whilst Madea and Bam discover that Debrah is getting a divorce from her new husband Dennis, without a prenup, whilst also promising Debrah that he'd give Tiffany and BJ each a million dollars for when the former gets married and the latter goes to college. Hurt by the revelations, Tiffany calls off the wedding.

Brian comes to Z's room to confront him, where it's revealed the woman he was talking to was his estranged mother. The two men reconcile at the balcony, with the latter making it clear that his intentions to marry Tiffany are pure. She overhears this and is touched by his words. After Brian finally accepts Z to be his son in law, the wedding resumes the next day. As the family checks out, Brian receives a multi-page bill, rooted from all the spending the family did with his card. He faints in disbelief as Madea and Joe flee the lobby to avoid his wrath, with everyone else are trying to wake him up.

== Cast ==
- Tyler Perry as:
  - Madea, a tough elderly lady
  - Brian Simmons, the son of Joe and nephew of Madea who works as a lawyer
  - Joe Simmons, the older brother of Madea
- Cassi Davis Patton as Aunt Bam, the cousin of Madea
- David Mann as Mr. Brown, a friend of Madea and the supposed father of Cora
- Tamela Mann as Cora, the daughter of Madea and supposed daughter of Brown
- Taja V. Simpson as Debrah, the ex-wife of Brian
- Diamond White as Tiffany, the daughter of Brian and Debrah
- Jermaine Harris as BJ, the son of Brian and Debrah and younger brother of Tiffany
- Xavier Smalls as Zavier, Tiffany’s fiancé
- Walnette Carrington as Kaja, Zavier's mother whose presence embarrasses him
- Brandon Sutton as Dennis, Debrah's ex-husband and Tiffany's stepfather
- Rocky Myers as Fred, a co-worker of Brian
- Hartman Oral Noel Brown II as a reverend

== Production ==
In January 2024, it was announced that a new film in the Madea cinematic universe, titled Madea's Destination Wedding, was in development, with Tyler Perry directing, writing, producing, and reprising his role as Mabel "Madea" Simmons. Principal photography began at Tyler Perry Studios in Atlanta from January 15 to January 26, 2024, with additional filming taking place in the Dominican Republic.

== Release ==
Madea's Destination Wedding was released on Netflix on July 11, 2025.

== Reception ==
On the review aggregator website Rotten Tomatoes, 13% of 15 critics' reviews are positive.
