= Anthony Hemingway =

American television and film director

- Born: 1975 (age 50–51); United States
- Occupation: Film director
- Years active: 1997–present
- Spouse: Steven G. Norfleet (2019–)

Anthony Maurice Hemingway (born 1977) is an American television and film director. He has worked extensively in television, directing numerous episodes of CSI: NY, Treme, True Blood and Shameless, among others. He has also directed one feature film, Red Tails (2012). Before becoming a director he worked extensively as an assistant director in television and film.

== Career ==
Hemingway began working in the industry on Tom Fontana's HBO prison drama Oz as an assistant director. He later worked with Fontana on The Jury. He was the first assistant director on the film Freedomland in 2006 which was written by The Wire writer Richard Price and featured several cast members from that show alongside Samuel L. Jackson. He first worked with Jackson as assistant director on the 2002 film Changing Lanes. He first worked with director/producer Joe Chappelle on the 2000 film Takedown and has since collaborated with him on The Wire and CSI: NY.

For The Wire Hemingway served as the first assistant director on several episodes in the first season and throughout the second and third season. He returned in 2006 as a director for the seventh episode of the fourth season "Unto Others". Showrunner David Simon said that Hemingway's directing debut proved what they already knew, "that it was time." The experience has led to directing work on several other series for Hemingway.

In 2012, Hemingway's first feature film Red Tails was released. It was executive produced by George Lucas, who originated the project. It was produced by Rick McCallum and Chas. Floyd Johnson.

HBO is also developing Bros, a comedy set to be directed by Hemingway and written by Ben Cory Jones, that centers on three African-American brothers — two straight and one gay — who are each dealing with love and dating.

In 2020, Anthony Hemingway signed a deal with 20th Television to produce and direct its own projects.

== Personal life ==
Hemingway is gay, stating that he had known his entire life. He and actor Steven G. Norfleet started dating in 2014, after being introduced through a mutual friend. They were engaged in June 2018 and married in September 2019.

== Filmography ==
=== Director ===
Film

- Red Tails (2012)

Television

Year	Title	Episodes
2026	NCIS: Origins	"Johnny B. Goode" "Baila Esta Cumbia"
2026	Love Story	"Search and Recovery"
2025-2026	All's Fair	"I Want Revenge" "When We Were Young" "Everybody Dance Now" "Oh, Jesus!" "The Scorpio Ball" "Going Down" "Thanksgiving: Part 2"
2025	Boston Blue	"Pilot" "Faith and Family"
2025	Forever	"Ghosted"
2025	Forever	"Fourth Quarter"
2025	Forever	"Deep End"
2025	Forever	"Forever..."
2025	Power Book IV: Force	"A Seat at the Table"
2023	True Lies	"Pilot"
2021	Genius	"Aretha: Respect"
2021	Genius	"Aretha: Young, Gifted and Black"
2021	Genius	"Aretha: Amazing Grace"
2021	Genius	"Aretha: Chain of Fools"
2021	Genius	"Aretha: No One Sleeps"
2020	Power Book II: Ghost	"The Stranger"
2019	All Rise	"Sweet Bird of Truth"
2018	The Purge	"What Is America?"
2018	The Purge	"Take What's Yours"
2018	Unsolved: The Murders of Tupac and the Notorious B.I.G.	"Wherever It Leads"
2018	Unsolved: The Murders of Tupac and the Notorious B.I.G.	"Nobody Talks"
2018	Unsolved: The Murders of Tupac and the Notorious B.I.G.	"Take Your Best Shot"
2018	Unsolved: The Murders of Tupac and the Notorious B.I.G.	"Tupac Amaru Shakur"
2018	Unsolved: The Murders of Tupac and the Notorious B.I.G.	"Unsolved?"
2017	Shots Fired	"Hour Three: Someone's Son"
2016	Goliath	"Cover Your Ass"
2016	American Crime Story	"The Dream Team"
2016	American Crime Story	"100% Not Guilty"
2016	American Crime Story	"Conspiracy Theories"
2016	American Crime Story	"A Jury in Jail"
2016	American Crime Story	"Manna from Heaven"
2015	Glee	"The Rise and Fall of Sue Sylvester"
2015	Empire	"Unto the Breach"
2015	Shameless	"Crazy Love"
2015	Major Crimes	"Internal Affairs"
2014	The Newsroom	"Boston"
2014	The Newsroom	"Contempt"
2014	American Horror Story: Freak Show	"Test of Strength"
2014	Shameless	"Emily"
2014–2020	Power	"Whoever He Is"
2014–2020	Power	"Exactly How We Planned"
2014–2020	Power	"Not Exactly How We Planned"
2013	Major Crimes	"All In"
2013	Treme	"This City"
2013	Treme	"Yes We Can Can"
2013	Low Winter Sun	"Ann Arbor"
2013	The Newsroom	"Red Team III"
2013	Major Crimes	"Boys Will Be Boys"
2013	True Blood	"At Last"
2013	Shameless	"Cascading Failures"
2013	Shameless	"The American Dream"
2012	Vegas	"Estinto"
2012	Treme	"Tipitina"
2012	Once Upon a Time	"Child of the Moon"
2012	Treme	"Careless Love"
2012	Treme	"Knock with Me - Rock with Me"
2012	Shameless	"Father's Day"
2011	CSI: NY	"Air Apparent"
2011	The Closer	"A Family Affair"
2011	Fringe	"Wallflower"
2011	Falling Skies	"What Hides Beneath"
2011	Treme	"Accentuate the Positive"
2010	Treme	"All on a Mardi Gras Day"
2010	Treme	"At the Foot of Canal Street"
2010	True Blood	"Evil Is Going On"
2010	Undercovers	"Jailbreak"
2010	Community	"Epidemiology"
2008	The Closer	"Tijuana Brass"
2008	True Blood	"Plaisir d'Amour"
2008	Heroes	"Angels and Monsters"
2008	Criminal Minds	"3rd Life"
2008	The Wire	"Clarifications"
2008	CSI: NY	"Personal Foul"
2008	CSI: NY	"Like Water for Murder"
2008	Battlestar Galactica	"Six of One"
2008	ER	"Tandem Repeats"
2007	ER	"Under the Influence"
2007	The Black Donnellys	"The Only Thing Sure"
2007	CSI: Miami	"Burned"
2007	Shark	"Backfire"
2007	CSI: NY	"The Thing About Heroes"
2007	CSI: NY	"The Lying Game"
2007	Tell Me You Love Me	
2006	Close to Home	"Prodigal Son"
2006	Justice	"Wrongful Death"
2006	CSI: NY	"Hung Out to Dry"
2006	CSI: NY	"Heroes"
2006	The Wire	"Unto Others"

=== Assistant director ===
First Assistant

- Freedomland (2006) Second Unit
- The Manchurian Candidate (2004) Washington, D.C./New York unit
- The Jury (2004)
- The Wire (2002–2006) 23 episodes
- The Extreme Team (2003)
- Oz (2002) 4 episodes
- Juwanna Mann (2002)
- Changing Lanes (2002) Second Unit
- Law & Order Criminal Intent (2001)
- The Corner (2000) 4 episodes

Second Assistant

- New Best Friend (2002)
- Ali (2001) New York unit
- Takedown (2000)
- Monday After the Miracle (1998)
- Carriers (1998)
