= National Champions (film) =

2021 American film by Ric Roman Waugh

- Theatrical release poster
- Directed by: Ric Roman Waugh
- Written by: Adam Mervis
- Based on: National Champions by Adam Mervis
- Produced by: Basil Iwanyk; Brendon Boyea; Greg Economou
- Starring: Stephan James; J. K. Simmons; Alexander Ludwig; Lil Rel Howery; Tim Blake Nelson; Andrew Bachelor; Jeffrey Donovan; David Koechner; Kristin Chenoweth; Timothy Olyphant; Uzo Aduba; Julian Horton
- Cinematography: Khalid Mohtaseb
- Edited by: Gabriel Fleming
- Music by: Jonathan Sanford
- Production companies: Thunder Road Films; game1
- Distributed by: STXfilms
- Release date: December 10, 2021 (United States)
- Running time: 116 minutes
- Country: United States
- Language: English
- Budget: $8 million
- Box office: $475,488

National Champions is a 2021 American sports drama film directed by Ric Roman Waugh, based on the play of the same name by Adam Mervis. The film stars Stephan James, J. K. Simmons, Alexander Ludwig, Lil Rel Howery, Tim Blake Nelson, Andrew Bachelor, Jeffrey Donovan, David Koechner, Kristin Chenoweth, Timothy Olyphant, and Uzo Aduba.

National Champions was released in the United States on December 10, 2021, by STX Entertainment. The film received generally mixed reviews from critics and underperformed at the box office, grossing less than $500,000 against its $8 million budget. It was also the last film released by STX as STX restructured its operations and transitioned to a distribution deal with Lionsgate.

== Plot ==
A star collegiate quarterback ignites a players' strike hours before the biggest game of the year in order to fight for fair compensation, equality, and respect for the athletes who put their bodies and health on the line for their schools.

== Cast ==
- Stephan James as LeMarcus James
- J. K. Simmons as Coach James Lazor
- Alexander Ludwig as Emmett Sunday
- Lil Rel Howery as Coach Ronnie Dunn
- Tim Blake Nelson as Rodger Cummings
- Andrew Bachelor as Taylor Sheridan
- Jeffrey Donovan as Mark Titus
- David Koechner as Richard Everly
- Kristin Chenoweth as Bailey Lazor
- Timothy Olyphant as Elliott Schmidt
- Uzo Aduba as Katherine Poe
- Julian Horton as Orlando Bishop

Additionally, Russell Wilson, Malcolm Jenkins, Jemele Hill, Mike Greenberg, French Montana, Karl-Anthony Towns, and Steve Levy all appear as themselves in the film.

== Production ==
On April 27, 2021, Stephan James and J. K. Simmons were confirmed to star. In May 2021, Uzo Aduba, Alexander Ludwig, Andrew Bachelor, David Koechner, Tim Blake Nelson, Timothy Olyphant, Kristin Chenoweth, Jeffrey Donovan, and Lil Rel Howery were added to the cast. Principal photography began on May 17, 2021, in New Orleans, and was scheduled to conclude on June 11. The film was shot on an $8 million budget. Jonathan Sanford composed the film's score.

== Release ==
The film was theatrically released in 1,197 theaters by STX Entertainment on December 10, 2021. It was originally scheduled for release on November 24, 2021. The film was released on Blu-ray and DVD on March 8, 2022, by Universal Studios Home Entertainment.

== Reception ==
=== Box office ===
Boxoffice Pro projected the film would earn between $750,000 and $2.5 million in its opening weekend. However, the film opened below estimates, earning $301,028 in its first three days to finish thirteenth at the box office. Men made up 68% of the audience during its opening, with those above the age of 45 comprising 47% of ticket sales. The ethnic breakdown of the audience showed that 49% were European Americans, 15% Hispanic and Latino Americans, 22% African American, and 14% Asian or other. In its second and final weekend, the film earned $34,818 in 898 theaters for an average of $38 per screen. As of December 2021, its second-weekend drop of 88.4% ranks as the second-biggest of all time.

=== Critical response ===
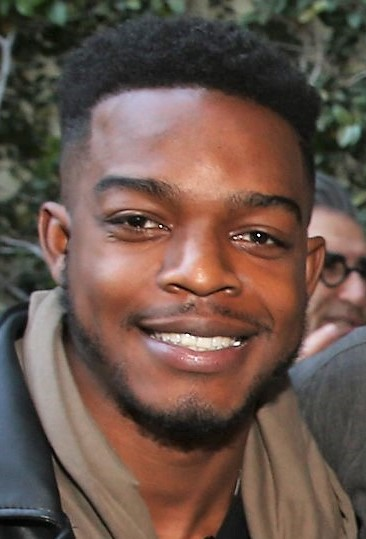
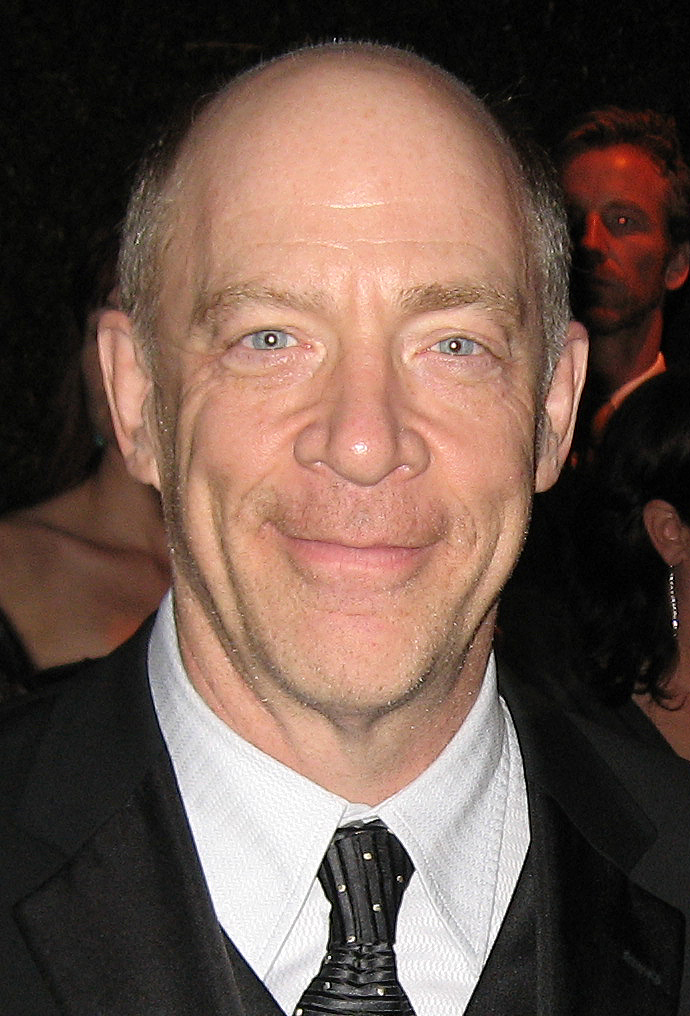
Stephan James and J. K. Simmons received praise for their performances.

On the review aggregator website Rotten Tomatoes, 66% of 58 critics' reviews are positive, with an average rating of 6.1/10. The website's consensus reads: "National Champions is well-acted and timely, even if it undercuts its own effectiveness with cheesy dialogue and gimmicky plot twists." Metacritic, which uses a weighted average, assigned the film a score of 52 out of 100, based on 15 critics, indicating "mixed or average" reviews. Audiences polled by PostTrak gave it an average score of 63%, with 45% saying they would definitely recommend it. Critics generally praised Stephan James and J. K. Simmons for their performances but criticized the story and its attempts at humor. Others noted the blatant product placement and compared the film negatively to High Flying Bird (2019), recommending viewers watch it instead. Writing for The New York Times, Glenn Kenny said "the movie dilutes its impact with lackluster direction of samey scenes — people in hotel rooms speechifying — and a distracting nighttime soap subplot." The Chicago Reader's Adam Khatib wrote, "While not a perfect film, National Champions does express the discourse around an important issue in a compelling way."
