= Geneviève Laporte =

French filmmaker and author (1926–2012)

Genevieve Laporte (1926 – 30 March 2012) was a French philanthropist, documentary filmmaker, artists' model, poet, and author of sixteen books. She is known for being one of Pablo Picasso's last lovers during the 1950s. In 1951, they began an affair which lasted for two years. In 2005, she auctioned off 20 of Picasso's works which had been given to her, many of them portraits of her.

== Biography ==
=== Relationship with Picasso ===
Laporte first met Picasso in October 1944 when she was 17 and was interviewing him for a school newspaper. They developed a platonic friendship while discussing his art. Years later, when she was aged 24, Laporte met Picasso again at his apartment and they began an affair in 1951. At the time, Picasso was nearly 45 years older than Laporte and had recently fathered two children with Françoise Gilot. They spent the summer of 1951 together on a holiday in Saint-Tropez alongside the French poet Paul Eluard and his wife, Dominique. Picasso made several sketches during their time in Saint-Tropez which display the inscription "For Genevieve". The sketches were later described by the Hermitage Museum in Saint Petersburg as Picasso's "Genevieve Period". In an interview, Laporte described her relationship with Picasso, "He was a tender man, respectful, intelligent, timid—not at all the abominable snowman we’re used to hearing about". Two years later, Picasso asked Laporte to move in with him at a house on the French Riviera after Gilot had left him in 1953. Instead, Laporte married a former Parisian resistance fighter in 1959 and they had a son. She said, "His ex-girlfriend leaves one morning, and he asks me to move in to the house the next day. Would you have gone?" She was told by the artist Jean Cocteau that this decision had "saved her skin".

In June 2005, she auctioned 20 drawings produced by Picasso, considered to be "love letters" by the artist. They were given to her by Picasso during their time spent in Saint-Tropez in 1951. The auction took place at the Artcurial in Paris and achieved a value of 1.54 million Euro (£1.03m). With the money earned from the auction she created a foundation "Genevieve Laporte de Pierrebourg, pour la defense de la nature et des animaux", with agreement of the Fondation de France.

=== Work and achievements ===
Laporte made 18 documentary films in Africa, and the Académie française awarded her a prize in 1999 for a volume of poetry. She wrote sixteen books, four of which are on Picasso:

- Si tard le soir le soleil brille (1973)
  - English translation: Sunshine at midnight (1974)
- Un amour secret de Picasso (1999)
- Du petit Pablo au grand Picasso (2003)
- Le grand Picasso (2004)

Her final book was Du petit Wolfgang au grand Mozart (2006).
