= David Ebershoff =

American writer, editor, and teacher

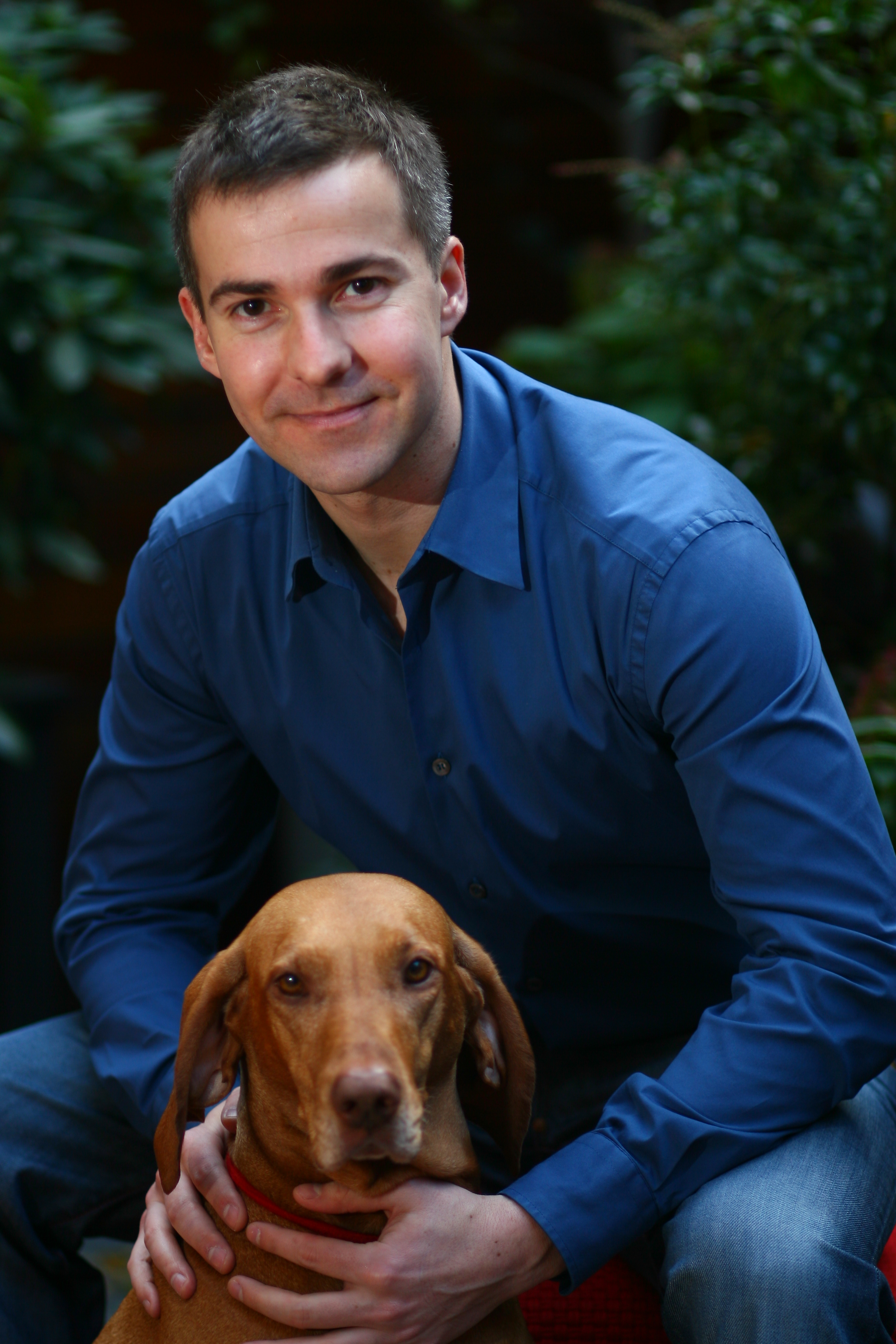
- Ebershoff in 2007
- Born: January 17, 1969 (age 57); Pasadena, California, U.S.
- Occupation: Writer
- Writing career
- Period: 2000–present
- Notable works: The Danish Girl; The Rose City; Pasadena; The 19th Wife
- Website: www.ebershoff.com

David Ebershoff (born January 17, 1969) is an American writer, editor, and teacher. His debut novel, The Danish Girl, was adapted into an Academy Award-winning film of the same name in 2015, while his third novel, The 19th Wife, was adapted into a television movie of the same name in 2010.

== Writing career ==
Ebershoff published his first novel, The Danish Girl, in 2000. It is inspired by the life of Lili Elbe, one of the first people to have gender reassignment surgery. The novel won the Rosenthal Foundation Award from the American Academy of Arts and Letters and the Lambda Literary Award for Transgender Fiction, and was a finalist for the New York Public Library's Young Lions Award and an American Library Association Award, and a New York Times Notable Book of the Year. An international bestseller, it has been translated into more than twenty-five languages.

In 2015, producer Gail Mutrux adapted the novel into an Oscar-winning film also called The Danish Girl, directed by Tom Hooper and starring Eddie Redmayne and Alicia Vikander. The film was nominated for four Academy Awards, three Golden Globes, two Screen Actors Guild Award, five Critics' Choice Awards, and five BAFTAs. Vikander won the Academy Award for Best Supporting Actress, a SAG, and a Critics Choice Award for her role in the film. It won the Queer Lion Award at the Venice Film Festival.

In 2017 The New York Times named The Danish Girl as one of the "25 books that have shaped LGBTQ literature over the past 20 years." In 2017 Ebershoff established the Lili Elbe scholarships for emerging transgender writers in conjunction with the Lambda Literary Foundation.

Ebershoff's book of short stories, The Rose City, is a collection of stories about queer life at the end of the 20th century. It won the Ferro-Grumley Award for excellence in LGBT fiction, was a finalist for the Lambda Literary Award, and was named one of the best books of the year by the Los Angeles Times. Short story writers William Trevor and Alice Munro influenced Ebershoff's short fiction, and he has discussed learning to write stories by studying their work. The epigraph of The Rose City comes from Trevor: "Like all children, I led a double life."

Ebershoff's second novel, Pasadena, was his first New York Times bestseller and was inspired by the history of his home town.

Ebershoff's third novel, The 19th Wife, was a New York Times and Sunday Times bestseller, selling almost a million copies around the world. The novel is about one of Brigham Young's plural wives, Ann Eliza Young, as well as polygamy in the United States in the 21st century. Publishers Weekly called it "an exquisite tour-de-force" and named it one of the best books of the year. Kirkus Reviews said that it was "reminiscent of Wallace Stegner's Angle of Repose in scope and ambition", while the Los Angeles Times praised it by saying that "it does that thing all good novels do: it entertains us." In 2009, British television talk show hosts Richard and Judy chose The 19th Wife for their on-air book club, making the book a #1 bestseller in the UK. In 2010, the book was made into a television movie of the same name starring Matt Czuchry, Patricia Wettig, and Chyler Leigh. The novel was nominated for the Ferro-Grumley Award and the Utah Book Award. True West Magazine, citing Ebershoff's West Coast heritage and interests, named him the Best Western Fiction Writer in the United States.

In 2017, The 19th Wife was #1 on Book Riot's list of 100 Must-Read American Historical novels. In 2018, he joined the Leadership Council of the Lambda Literary Foundation. He's developing a television series with Keshet Studios called American Purgatory. His journalism has appeared in The New York Times, the London Sunday Times, Vogue, The Guardian, Variety, and Conde Nast Traveler. In September 2020, he published an essay in The Paris Review about editing Supreme Court Justice Ruth Bader Ginsburg Editing Justice Ginsburg

== Editing career ==
Ebershoff has worked as a book editor at Random House for twenty years, starting as a summer intern. He is currently Vice President & Executive Editor at Hogarth Books and Random House. As an editor he's known for helping literary fiction and nonfiction writers win major prizes and become bestsellers. He edited three Pulitzer Prize winners, one National Book Award winner, an Oprah Book Club Selection, a winner of the PEN/Faulkner Award, four Booker Prize nominees, and four National Book Critics Circle Award finalists, and more than 25 New York Times bestsellers.

In 2013, Ebershoff became the first editor to edit the winners of the Pulitzer Prizes for Fiction and for History in the same year (The Orphan Master's Son by Adam Johnson for fiction and Embers of War by Fredrik Logevall for history). In 2015, he edited the winner of the National Book Award in fiction, Fortune Smiles by Adam Johnson, and the winner of the Pulitzer Prize for Biography or Autobiography, The Pope and Mussolini by David Kertzer. He edited "America's War for the Greater Middle East" by Andrew Bacevich which was longlisted for the 2016 National Book Award. He edited "Behold the Dreamers" by Imbolo Imbue, winner of the 2017 PEN/Faulkner Award and the 2017 Oprah Book Club selection.

Ebershoff has edited writers David Mitchell, Gary Shteyngart, Adam Johnson, former United States Poet Laureate Billy Collins, Teju Cole, Charles Bock, Jennifer duBois, Nobel Peace Prize-winner Shirin Ebadi, Academy Award-winning actress Diane Keaton, and Pulitzer Prize winners Sonia Nazario, Amy Ellis Nutt, Sebastian Smee, and Robert Massey. Ebershoff was Jane Jacobs's editor on her final two books and was Norman Mailer's editor for the last five years of his life. Working with Truman Capote's estate, he oversaw the Capote publications for Random House, and was the editor of The Complete Stories of Truman Capote, Summer Crossing, and Portraits and Observations. He also edited the posthumous publications of W.G. Sebald for Random House. He was formerly the publishing director of Random House's classics imprint, the Modern Library.

== Teaching career ==
Ebershoff has taught writing at NYU and Princeton, and in the MFA program at Columbia University.

== Personal life ==
Ebershoff attended Polytechnic School in Pasadena, California, and Brown University. He has appeared twice on Out Magazine's annual Out 100 list of influential LGBT people. He lives in New York.

== See also ==
- LGBT culture in New York City
- List of LGBT people from New York City
- Literary analysis
