= Mental (TV series) =

American medical drama/mystery television series

- Genre: Medical drama Mystery
- Created by: Dan LeVine
- Developed by: Fox Television Studios; Fox International Channels
- Starring: Chris Vance; Jacqueline McKenzie; Annabella Sciorra; Derek Webster; Marisa Ramirez; Nicholas Gonzalez; Edwin Hodge
- Composer: Trevor Morris
- Countries of origin: Colombia; United States
- Original language: English
- No. of seasons: 1
- No. of episodes: 13

Production
- Executive producers: Dan LeVine; Deborah Joy LeVine
- Production locations: Bogotá, Colombia
- Running time: 42 minutes
- Production companies: Kedzie Productions; Infinity Pictures; Fox Television Studios

Original release
- Network: Fox
- Release: May 26 – August 14, 2009

Mental (stylized in promos as MƎNTAL:) is a mystery medical drama television series produced by Fox's subsidiary Fox Telecolombia, which aired from May 26 to August 14, 2009 on FOX international channels for Latin America, Europe and Asia, starring Chris Vance and Annabella Sciorra. Mental was executive-produced by Deborah Joy LeVine – creator of the successful drama series Lois & Clark: The New Adventures of Superman and the Lifetime series The Division, and executive producer of Any Day Now, Dawson's Creek and the CBS series Early Edition – and her brother and writing/producing partner, Dan LeVine. Following its U.S. debut, it aired in 35 additional countries. Fox Latin America aired the first episode as a "Worldwide Premiere" on June 2, 2009. Fox aired the pilot episode on May 26, 2009, for the American market. Fox TV Studios ordered 13 episodes. It began production on June 2, 2008, at the Fox Telecolombia production facilities in Bogotá.

Although the series was filmed in the city of Bogotá in Colombia representing Los Angeles (United States), no Colombian actor was cast as a regular character and very few were cast for occasional roles, because of the strict American nature of the series. According to TVWeek, Jacqueline McKenzie, Derek Webster, Nicholas Gonzalez, and Marisa Ramirez were added to the cast of Mental, "probably as recurrent characters."

Due to declining ratings, Fox cancelled the show following its first season.

== Characters ==
=== Main ===
Dr. Jack Gallagher (Chris Vance)
The protagonist of the show, Jack is an Australian man living in America, for what seems like much of his life as his stepfather of many years is American. He uses rather unorthodox methods to get inside the patient's head to help cure them; however, this usually gains him spite from his fellow doctors. He enjoys riding his bike and has a mentally unstable sister whom he is trying to find, and has been for four years. At the end of the episode "Do Over," he finds Becky, and she is placed in the hospital, diagnosed with schizophrenia. Jack's mother and stepfather come and try to convince him to let them take Becky to Florida for treatment. Jack is skeptical, but Becky decides to leave with her parents. In the season finale, Jack is seen talking to an anonymous therapist (who turns out to be himself), and he admits that he has an irrational fear of developing schizophrenia, which is why he is afraid of commitment. It is also revealed that he, most likely, is dealing with clinical depression at this point. In the final scene, he punches Carl and is subsequently fired. Jack then leaves; the season, as well as the series, ends. The last shot of the series shows us Dr. Gallagher now vagrant and without direction, in opposition to his recently vagrant sister, who has chosen to return home with her family. The season ends in direct opposition to the season opening.

Nora Skoff (Annabella Sciorra)
She is a hospital administrator who shares a romantic past with Dr. Gallagher. Nora has a distinctive and conservative style. She successfully battled cancer and is divorced with two daughters.

Dr. Carl Belle (Derek Webster)
Dr. Belle is a master politician who is dedicated to Jack's downfall, even secretly black-mailing Arturo to spy on Jack.

Dr. Veronica Hayden-Jones (Jacqueline McKenzie)
Dr. Hayden-Jones is a dedicated psychiatrist who is upset that she wasn't given Jack's job. She is married to a musician, but was cheating on him with one of the doctors in the hospital. This doctor has subsequently resigned.

Dr. Chloë Artis (Marisa Ramirez)
Dr. Artis is a gorgeous doctor who is passing the time in a residency she feels is beneath her until Jack opens her mind to the inspirational benefits of psychiatry. She is frequently pursued by Arturo before she reveals to him that she is a lesbian.

Dr. Arturo Suarez (Nicholas Gonzalez)
Dr. Suarez is a first-year resident. He is young and cocky, constantly looking for love (or sex), and won't seem to give up on Chloe, even knowing her sexual orientation. Arturo falsified his transcripts so that he could become a doctor and that information is being held against him by Carl, who is blackmailing Arturo into spying on Jack.

=== Recurring ===
Margo Stroud (Samantha Eggar)
Jack and Becky's mother, whose first husband and the father of her children, died. She is now living in Florida and is married to James.

James Stroud (Madison Mason)
Jack and Becky's step-father and Margo's second husband. James is a retired Navy Vice Admiral - Jack even bitterly states that James raised them as though they were soldiers. Jack holds a grudge on James for sticking Becky in the first institution he could find, twenty years ago, when Becky was diagnosed with schizophrenia. He is American.

Becky Gallagher (Amanda Douge)
Becky is Jack's twin sister, who was diagnosed with schizophrenia twenty years ago. She has been missing for four years, and showed up on Jack's doorstep near the end of the first season. Jack is very protective over her and they both share a strong loving bond. She is frequently haunted by hallucinations of a young man named Gabe.

=== Special guests ===
The series features performances by actors from the United States or other countries who have traveled to Bogotá, Colombia, to film the episode where they have their respective appearance in the next table special performances that stand out:

Character	Actor	Episode
Emily	Bella Thorne	Pilot
Vincent Martin	Silas Weir Mitchell	Pilot
Mellisa	Nicholle Tom	A Beautiful Delusion
Richard Rainer	Michael B. Silver	A Beautiful Delusion
Conor Stephens	Billy Unger	Manic at the Disco
Aynsley Skoff	Kay Panabaker	Manic at the Disco
Liam McBride	Tom Parker	Roles of Engagement
Celeste	Krista Vendy	Roles of Engagement
Marcie Crane	Lori Heuring	Rainy Days
Heather Masters	Allison Scagliotti	House of Mirrors
Mimi	Nina Siemaszko	Obsessively Yours
Brian Jennings	Alex Weed	Life and Limb
Ellis Kahane	Joseph D. Reitman	Bad Moon Rising

== Episodes ==
No.	Title	Directed by	Written by	Original release date
1	"Pilot"	Guy Ferland	Deborah Joy LeVine & Dan LeVine	May 26, 2009
When young and dynamic Dr. Jack Gallagher arrives at Wharton Memorial Hospital for his first day as Director of Health Mental Services, he must deal not only with a patient who suffers from hallucinations but also with the skepticism of the rest of the staff regarding his unorthodox methods of treatment. Name of the patient: Vincent Martin (Silas Weir Mitchell)
2	"A Beautiful Delusion"	Rod Hardy	Story: Alyson Feltes; Teleplay: Deborah Joy Levine	June 2, 2009
Jack and his team deal with a young woman suffering from hysterical pregnancy. But what they do not suspect is that her husband is under the same delusion. Name of the patients: Mellisa (Nicholle Tom) and Richard Ranier (Michael B. Silver)
3	"Book of Judges"	Guy Ferland	Dan Levine	June 9, 2009
A battle is set up in Wharton Memorial Hospital between Jack and eminent philosopher and book author Dr. Gideon Graham (David Carradine), who is in a catatonic state. The episode was dedicated in Carradine's memory.
4	"Manic at the Disco"	Jesus Trevino	Deborah Joy Levine	June 16, 2009
A child suffering from bipolar disorder is secluded in the hospital after an incident with a knife. Jack finds out the only way to help him is by playing a video game existing only in the boy's head. Name of the patient: Conor (Billy Unger). Guest star Kay Panabaker as Aynsley Skoff.
5	"Roles of Engagement"	Rod Hardy	Deborah Joy Levine & Dan Levine	June 23, 2009
After a panic attack in the middle of a live talk show, a movie star is secluded in the hospital. Despite the resistance of the patient to undergo psychiatric care, Jack suspects he is suffering a serious personality disorder. Name of the patient: Liam McBride (Tom Parker).
6	"Rainy Days"	David Jackson	Dan Levine	July 3, 2009
When Leonard Steinberg, a gambling addict seriously in debt, threatens to jump off the roof of Wharton Memorial, Jack tries to talk him down in order to get to the bottom of his suicidal tendencies. Later, Jack goes to court to testify on behalf of a mentally incapable patient charged with manslaughter by prosecutor Marcie Crane (Lori Heuring), a high-profile attorney who has never lost a case. In a surprising twist of events, Jack's expertise is needed more than ever as the case turns out to be much more complicated than it originally appeared. Meanwhile, Jack and the team meet for a poker game after work, and sparks continue to fly between Rylan (Warren Cole) and Veronica. Name of the patient: Leonard Steinberg
7	"Obsessively Yours"	Jeremiah Chechik	Deborah Joy Levine	July 10, 2009
When Veronica's former patient Craig (Rob LaBelle) returns to Wharton Memorial, Veronica finds his Obsessive Compulsive Disorder and Tourette's syndrome have advanced and become worse than ever. When Craig's wife, Mimi (Nina Siemaszko), pushes for an invasive, unproven brain surgery to treat his condition rather than have him undergo therapy in the mental ward again, Jack and Veronica become skeptical of her wishes. As they attempt to dissuade Mimi from moving forward with Craig's operation, the team discovers Mimi may have some serious issues of her own. Meanwhile, Jack becomes infatuated with a neurosurgeon named Zan (Jaime Ray Newman), and the rest of the team questions their own love lives. Name of the patient/diagnosis: Craig Peters/Obsessive Compulsive Disorder, Mysophobic, Tourette's syndrome
8	"House of Mirrors"	David Jackson	Story: Deborah Joy Levine; Teleplay: Jacqueline Zambrano	July 17, 2009
When 16-year-old Heather Masters (Allison Scagliotti) attempts to commit suicide by lighting herself on fire, Jack and the team must work to get to the bottom of her suicidal tendencies. However, when further testing and discussions with her father and psychiatrist reveal a dark secret that has been hidden from Heather since her birth, Jack is faced with a difficult ethical dilemma. Meanwhile, the relationship between Jack and Dr. Zan Avidan grows, and Jack continues his search for his twin sister with schizophrenia, Becky. Name of the patient/diagnosis: Heather Masters/Attempted Suicide
9	"Coda"	Whitney Ransick	Deborah Joy Levine	July 24, 2009
After a drug dealer is shot and killed in his own apartment, the only witness to the murder is the dealer's autistic teenage daughter, Leeza Wilson (Holliston Coleman). While the detectives struggle to obtain any helpful evidence from Leeza, Jack uses his unconventional methods to uncover new clues from Leeza's statements. However, when the detectives bring forth a subpoena to move Leeza out of Wharton Memorial, Jack is forced to race against time to solve the murder mystery. Name of the patient/diagnosis: Leeza Wilson/Autistic
10	"Do Over"	Rick Rosenthal	Dan Levine	July 31, 2009
Jack and Carl take on the case of Billy Bauer, a construction worker suffering from physiological and psychological symptoms following an on-the-job accident. As Jack investigates the circumstances surrounding Billy's accident, he discovers Billy's memory of the event and reality of the event are completely different, though his symptoms resonate with a more severe incident that occurred on the same site over 100 years prior, The Rose Park Mine disaster. As Jack and Carl spar over Billy's diagnosis, Veronica and Rylan's relationship is jeopardized when Rylan makes a questionable decision on the job. Meanwhile, Jack continues to search for his missing sister. Name of the patient/disorder: William Bauer/Somatoform disorder, Acute Anxiety; Ethan Calloway/Obsessive Delusional Disorder
11	"Lines in the Sand"	Harry Winer	Dan Levine	August 7, 2009
After four years of trying to track her down, Jack is reunited with his estranged sister with schizophrenia, Becky, and quickly makes her treatment his No. 1 priority. Things prove to be more difficult than expected when another family member arrives and offers unsolicited advice. As Jack tries to help his sister, Veronica enlists his help with Clay, an Iraq War veteran who was committed after he shot himself in the hand in front of his wife and son. As Clay continues to suffer from both amnesia and posttraumatic stress disorder, Jack struggles to help him remember the details of the wartime attack that left him traumatized. Meanwhile, Jack's own family ties provide unexpected insight into Clay's situation as well as his own life. Name of the patients/disorder: Rebecca "Becky" Gallagher/Schizophrenia, and Lt. Clay Jefferson/Post-Traumatic Stress Disorder.
12	"Life and Limb"	Sandy Smolan	Deborah Joy Levine	August 14, 2009
When factory worker Brian Jennings (Alex Weed) is admitted to Wharton Memorial with a few chopped off fingers, Arturo and Chloe believe they can be re-attached. However, after he refuses any type of surgery, his boss claims that Brian has purposely cut off his fingers to collect disability payments for the rest of his life. The doctors are soon left questioning the true motives for his dismemberment when an even darker secret is discovered at Brian's apartment. Meanwhile, when Nora assigns Veronica (Jacqueline McKenzie) to Becky's case, Jack argues with his colleagues and his parents, who have power of attorney over Becky's affairs, about the course of her treatment. When Becky tells Jack she's moving to Florida to a facility near their parents, he struggles with the decision to keep his sister close or to let her go. Name of the patients/disorder: Brian Jennings/Delusional, Body Integrity Identity Disorder (BIID)
13	"Bad Moon Rising"	John Harrison	Deborah Joy Levine & Dan Levine	August 14, 2009
When a patient named Ellis Kahane (Joseph D. Reitman) tries to check himself into the psych ward at Wharton Memorial claiming to be a werewolf that will transform at the next full moon, Carl turns him away believing him to be just a nuisance. However, things take a dangerous turn when Ellis takes the entire team hostage to prove to them that his transformation will take place when the sun sets that night. Meanwhile, as Wharton is faced with serious budget deficits, Nora struggles in her attempts to find proper funding for the hospital, and is forced to make a difficult decision when given a tempting offer. Also, Jack speaks with a therapist regarding his recent troubles. Name of the patient/disorder: Ellis Kahane/Generalized anxiety disorder, Clinical lycanthropy

== Critical response ==
Metacritic gave season 1 a score of 40% based on reviews by 18 critics.

== Ratings ==
The series premiere of Mental on FOX improved on its lead-in and averaged a 3.6/6, to go with just under 5.8 million viewers.

=== U.S. ratings ===
Order	Episode	Rating	Share	Rating/Share (18-49)	Viewers (millions)	Rank
1	"Pilot"	3.6	6	2.1/6	5.80	9
2	"A Beautiful Delusion"	3.2	5	1.6/4	5.04	22
3	"Book of Judges"	3.1	5	1.4/4	4.83	22
4	"Manic at the Disco"	3.0	5	1.5/4	4.74	12
5	"Roles of Engagement"	2.4	4	1.2/3	3.69	25
6	"Rainy Days"	2.0	4	0.8/4	3.43	27
7	"Obsessively Yours"	2.0	4	1.0/4	3.68	27
8	"House of Mirrors"	2.4	4	0.9/3	3.70	31
9	"Coda"	2.4	5	0.9/4	3.69	30
10	"Do Over"	2.4	5	0.8/3	2.92	28
11	"Lines in the Sand"	2.1	4	0.9/3	3.26	29
12	"Life and Limb"	2.0	4	0.9/4	2.99	32
13	"Bad Moon Rising"	2.2	3	0.9/3	3.34	32

=== Canadian ratings ===
Order	Episode	Viewers (100'00s)	Rank
1	"Pilot"	7.15	#25
2	"A Beautiful Delusion"	7.00	#29
3	"Book of Judges"	6.84	#29
4	"Manic at the Disco"	8.33	#20
5	"Roles of Engagement"	N/A	N/A
6	"Rainy Days"	N/A	N/A
7	"Obsessively Yours"	N/A	N/A
8	"House of Mirrors"	N/A	N/A
9	"Coda"	N/A	N/A
10	"Do Over"	N/A	N/A
11	"Lines in the Sand"	N/A	N/A
12	"Life and Limb"	N/A	N/A
13	"Bad Moon Rising"	N/A	N/A

== DVD Releases ==
A DVD of the complete series titled Mental - The Complete 1st Season was announced on September 2, 2009. The DVD was released on December 1, 2009. The DVD includes all 13 episodes on a 4-disc set, plus an unrated alternate pilot.
