= The 19th Wife (film) =

- Film poster
- Genre: Drama
- Based on: The 19th Wife by David Ebershoff
- Written by: Richard Friedenberg
- Directed by: Rod Holcomb
- Starring: Chyler Leigh; Matt Czuchry; Patricia Wettig; Jeff Hephner
- Music by: Steve Porcaro
- Country of origin: United States
- Original language: English

Production
- Executive producers: Barbara Lieberman; Andrea Baynes
- Producer: Brian Leslie Parker
- Cinematography: Peter Benison
- Editor: Victor Du Bois
- Running time: 95 minutes
- Production company: Sony Pictures Television

Original release
- Network: Lifetime
- Release: September 13, 2010

The 19th Wife is a 2010 American drama television film directed by Rod Holcomb and written by Richard Friedenberg, based on David Ebershoff's 2008 novel of the same name. It aired on Lifetime on September 13, 2010.

== Plot ==
Amidst a Southern Utah Fundamentalist Church of Jesus Christ of Latter-Day Saints community, BeckyLyn (Wettig) is accused of murdering her polygamist husband. A fellow wife, Queenie (Leigh) is convinced of her friend's innocence and with BeckyLyn's son, Jordan (Czuchry) they work to clear his mother's name.

== Cast ==
- Chyler Leigh as Queenie
- Matt Czuchry as Jordan
- Patricia Wettig as BeckyLyn
- Jeff Hephner as Hiram
- John Bourgeois as Brigham Young

== Reception ==
The Huffington Post praised the "impressive" cast for bringing "life and credence to this fascinating story of murder and faith". The review continued: "It is fascinating to watch from beginning to end not just because of the "whodunit" factor but also because of the religious implications. Plus the cast strikes just the right tone of intensity and natural charm."

Monsters and Critics described it posively as a "sweeping epic" that is both "compelling" and "thought-provoking."

Ebsershoff, the author of the original novel, was not satisfied with the film over significant plot changes the producers made. Most significantly of these was to exclude Jordan's homosexuality, as presented in the novel, and present him as a heterosexual character.

Ebsershoff explained his disapproval in an interview:

I had no role in the adaptation. A few weeks before filming began I learned that Jordan had been rewritten as straight. I was told that this was a network decision. Obviously I was offended, disappointed, and baffled. I hope that the movie sends people to the book so that they can meet my Jordan, along with his boyfriend, Tom, and their dogs, Elektra and Joey.

== See also ==
- The Danish Girl (film)
