= The Danish Girl =

2000 novel by David Ebershoff

- First hardcover edition, 2000
- Author: David Ebershoff
- Language: English
- Genre: Novel
- Publisher: Allen & Unwin (Australia); Viking Press (USA)
- Publication date: 2000
- Publication place: United States
- Media type: Print (hardback & paperback)
- Pages: 324
- ISBN: 0670888087
- Followed by: Pasadena

The Danish Girl is a novel by American writer David Ebershoff, published in 2000 by the Viking Press in the United States and Allen & Unwin in Australia.

The novel is a fictionalized account of the life of Lili Elbe, one of the first transgender women to undergo sex reassignment surgery.

The author has stated that the novel does not try to tell a true story. Ebershoff not only imagined most of what he wrote about Elbe's inner life, but also fabricated all of the other characters in the book, most important among them Wegener's blue-blooded American-born wife, Gerda Wegener.

In 2015, The Danish Girl was adapted into a film, directed by Tom Hooper.

== Plot ==
The story takes place in Copenhagen, Denmark. Lili Elbe (then presenting as male and using her birth name) is happily married to her wife, Gerda Wegener. Lili was raised with her best friend Hans. Gerda was raised in California with her twin brother Carlisle. Gerda eventually moved to Denmark and first met Lili at the Royal Academy before unfortunately separating due to World War I. During their separation, Gerda marries another man and has a child, with the child unfortunately dying at birth and her husband dying of tuberculosis. Gerda moves back to Denmark and marries Lili. The couple become painters; Lili specializes in painting landscapes and Gerda specializes in painting portraits.

One day, Gerda's friend Anna Fonsmark cancels her scheduled painting session with Gerda. Gerda, needing to have the painting finished as soon as possible, requests Lili to model in Anna's place. The session is interrupted when Anna suddenly enters their home, and Anna is the first to give Lili her new name.

Some time later, Lili and Gerda are invited to the annual Artists' Ball, and Gerda convinces Lili to wear a dress again. During the ball, Lili meets a man named Henrik Sandahl, and the two start a short-lived relationship, which Gerda discourages, fearing that if Lili does not tell Henrik of her marriage and her assigned birth gender, she would be hurting him by deceiving him.

Lili then starts having many nosebleeds and stomachaches. Gerda makes Lili visit a doctor named Dr. Hexler. Gerda's true intentions, however are actually to see if there is a tumor developing in Lili's pelvis; Gerda believes that if a tumor were indeed there, it might be the cause of the nosebleeds, stomachaches, and psychological problems. Hexler performs an X-ray on Lili and sees that there is no tumor; however, he tells Gerda that he discourages Lili from expressing her femininity.

Gerda starts to paint Lili more often, and these paintings spark popularity for Gerda. However, Lili becomes even more confused about who she truly is. Later on, Gerda meets Doctor Alfred Bolk. Bolk is interested in helping Lili undergo a vaginoplasty, to which Lili agrees. Bolk transfers to Dresden and Lili soon follows.

The first operation removes Lili's testicles, but during the operation, Bolk reveals that Lili was supposed to have undeveloped ovaries in her body the whole time, which he discloses to Gerda and restores in a succeeding operation.

Lili and Gerda then return to Denmark. Lili and Henrik fall in love. Henrik proposes to Lili and Hans asks Gerda to move with him to the United States. Bolk manages to contact Lili and tells her of a final operation, which will give Lili a uterus, allowing her to give birth. Lili tells Gerda of the operation; however, Gerda disapproves, as she finds it to be "too dangerous." Nonetheless, Lili is determined to get the operation and eventually does.

The surgery, however, is a failure, as Lili develops an infection shortly after she gets the operation. Whether Lili lives or dies is unclear.

== Awards ==
The Danish Girl won the Rosenthal Foundation Award from the American Academy of Arts and Letters and the Lambda Literary Award. It was also a finalist for the Tiptree Award, the New York Public Library's Young Lions Award, and an American Library Association Award, and was a New York Times Notable Book.

== Reception ==
In The New York Times Book Review, novelist and critic John Burnham Schwartz called the novel "arresting": "I hope people will read The Danish Girl. It is fascinating and humane." Critic Richard Bernstein wrote in The New York Times, "Mr. Ebershoff is telling us that love does involve a small dark space. The intelligence and tactfulness of his exploration of it make his novel a noteworthy event."

== Translations ==
The novel has been translated into more than ten languages and is published in paperback by Penguin.

== Film adaptation ==
The novel was adapted into a feature film directed by Tom Hooper, and starring Eddie Redmayne as Lili Elbe, Alicia Vikander as Gerda Wegener, Matthias Schoenaerts as Hans Axgil, Ben Whishaw as Henrik, Sebastian Koch as Dr. Kurt Warnekros and Amber Heard as Ulla Poulsen. The film received minor criticism for its illegitimate portrayal of historical events, but Redmayne and Vikander's performances received acclaim and nominations for all of the major acting awards. Vikander won the Academy Award for Best Supporting Actress and Redmayne was nominated for the Academy Award for Best Actor.

A Musical adaptation was announced to be in development in April 2026 with Book and Lyrics by Nora Brigid Monahan, Music by Alex Parker and Direction by Georgie Rankcom.
