= The 19th Wife =

2008 novel by David Ebershoff

- Author: David Ebershoff
- Language: English
- Genre: Novel
- Publisher: Random House
- Publication date: 2008
- Publication place: United States
- Media type: Print (hardback & paperback)
- Pages: 525
- ISBN: 1-4000-6397-3
- Preceded by: Pasadena

The 19th Wife is a 2008 novel by David Ebershoff. Inspired by the life of Ann Eliza Young, the novel intertwines a historical narrative with a modern-day murder mystery.

== Plot summary ==
Jordan Scott has been expelled from his fundamentalist sect in modern-day southern Utah, but returns to determine whether his mother killed his father. His mother is the 19th wife of his father. Interspersed with this murder mystery is a late 1800s historical narrative about Ann Eliza Young, who called herself the 19th wife of Latter-day Saint church president Brigham Young.

== Character list ==
- Jordan Scott is the son of BeckyLyn Scott who is accused of killing Jordan's father. Jordan has been excommunicated from his religious sect. He is a young homosexual man who works in the Los Angeles area in construction.
- BeckyLyn Scott is accused of killing her husband. She is his 19th wife.
- Queenie is Jordan Scott's half-sister. He is excommunicated when he is caught holding hands with her. She remains in the community and helps Jordan investigate their father's murder.

== Reception ==
The 19th Wife was #12 on the New York Times Bestseller List the week of August 31, 2008.

In a review of the book for The New York Times, Louisa Thomas wrote, "the multiplicity of perspectives serves to broaden Ebershoff’s depiction not only of polygamy, but also of the people whose lives it informs," giving the novel "a rare sense of moral urgency." John O'Connell for The Guardian wrote, "[F]or the most part this is intelligent, compelling stuff with several decent twists."

The novel was nominated for the Ferro-Grumley Award.

== Adaptations ==
A television movie adaptation aired on Lifetime on September 13, 2010, starring Matt Czuchry, Patricia Wettig, and Chyler Leigh.
