= Ann Eliza Young =

Early Mormon and later a critic of polygamy

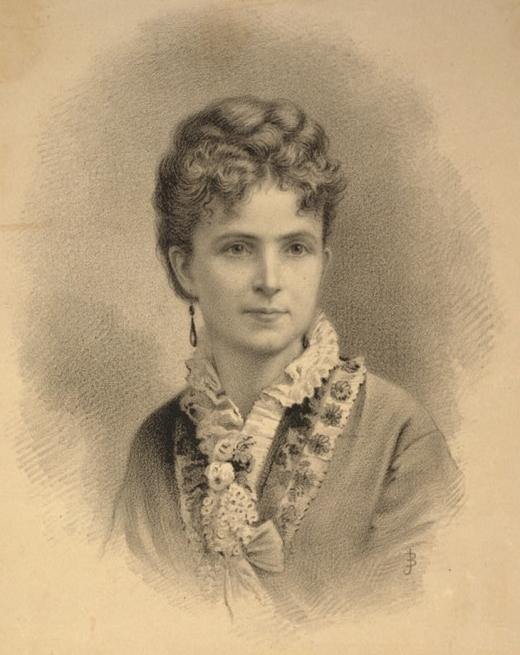
- A lithograph of Ann Eliza Young, sometime between 1869 and 1875.
- Born: Ann Eliza Webb; September 13, 1844; Nauvoo, Illinois, U.S.
- Died: December 7, 1917 (aged 73); Sparks, Nevada, U.S.
- Resting place: Mountain View Cemetery, Reno, Nevada
- Other names: Ann Eliza Webb Dee Young Denning
- Occupations: Social advocate; Author
- Spouses: James Dee (m. 1863) Brigham Young (m. 1869–1875): Moses Denning (div. c. 1907)
- Children: 2
- Parents: Chauncey G. Webb; Eliza Jane Churchill

Ann Eliza Young (September 13, 1844 – December 7, 1917) also known as Ann Eliza Webb Dee Young Denning was one of Brigham Young's fifty-six wives and later a critic of polygamy. Her autobiography, Wife No. 19, was a recollection of her experiences in the Church of Jesus Christ of Latter-day Saints (LDS Church). She grew up in a polygamous household that moved to Utah during the Mormon migration. Ann Eliza was married and divorced three times: first to James Dee, then Young, and finally Moses Denning. Her divorce from Young reached a national audience when Ann Eliza sued with allegations of neglect, cruel treatment, and desertion. She was born a member of the LDS Church but was excommunicated shortly after her public divorce from Young.

== Early life and first marriage ==
Ann Eliza Webb was born in Nauvoo, Illinois, in 1844, to Chauncey Griswold Webb and his wife, Eliza Jane Churchill. Chauncey G. Webb was a 32-year-old carriage-maker, and Eliza Jane a 29-year-old schoolteacher at the time of Ann Eliza's birth. Ann Eliza was the youngest of five children, four of which survived to adulthood. Her three older brothers were Chauncey Gilbert, Edward Milo, and Lorenzo Dow. Ann Eliza was about a year old when her father took a second wife, Elizabeth Taft, in accordance with the contemporary polygamous practices of the LDS Church. In 1846, the Webb family moved to the Salt Lake Valley with the Mormon pioneers. As a teenager in Utah, Webb and other Latter-day Saint youth participated in local theatricals and dancing.

=== First marriage and divorce ===
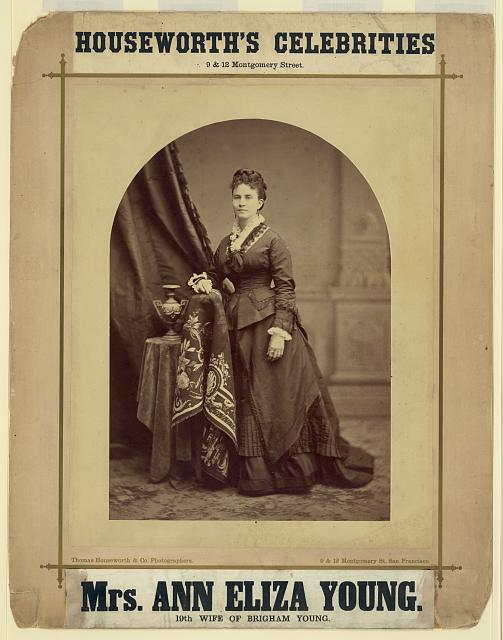
Ann Eliza Young, 1875

Ann Eliza married James Dee monogamously on April 10, 1863, in Salt Lake City, Utah Territory. They had two sons together, Edward Wesley and Leonard "Louis" Lorenzo, but the couple later divorced. According to her biographer, Irving Wallace, "for the rest of her days Ann Eliza would always refer to James Dee as the man who 'blighted' her life."

== Polygamous marriage to Brigham Young ==
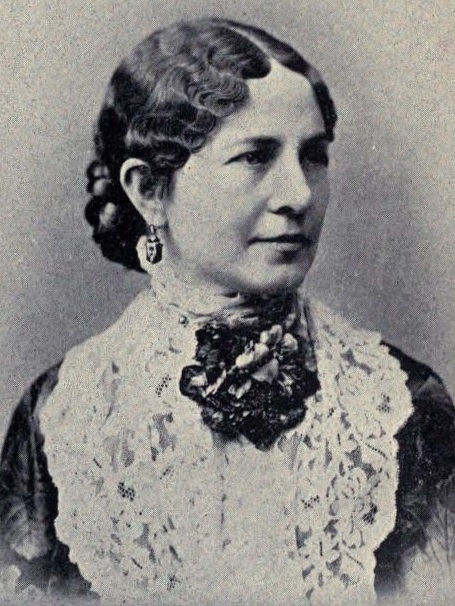
Ann Young ca. 1887

On the advice of her family, Ann Eliza married Brigham Young, the second president of the LDS Church, when he was 67 years old and she was a 24-year-old divorcee. They were married on April 7, 1869. The ceremony was presided over by LDS Church leader Heber C. Kimball. At her request, Ann Eliza was set up in a separate home in Salt Lake City, on the condition that she visit the Lion House on occasion.

Although Ann Eliza later called herself Young's "wife number 19", others have referred to her as his "27th wife". One researcher concluded that she was actually the 52nd woman to marry Young. The discrepancies may be due, in part, to difficulties in defining what constitutes a "wife" in early Mormon polygamous practices. A book published in the 1890s and endorsed by church leaders entitled Pictures and Biographies of Brigham Young and His Wives provides brief descriptions of 26 wives, including Ann Eliza.

=== Divorce from Young ===
In 1873, Brigham Young allowed Latter-day Saints to take on boarders who were not members of the faith. Methodist Reverend C. C. Stratton and his wife boarded with Ann Eliza. It is possible that the couple's efforts may have aided in Ann Eliza's decision to leave Young and the LDS Church. On Ann Eliza's legal counsel was Judge Hagan who also believed that Stratton was primarily to blame for Ann Eliza's separation from Young. In a statement, Stratton denied having any influence on Ann Eliza's decision, claiming instead that he had encouraged her to stay in her situation with Young. He indicated, however, that Ann Eliza was "a person of womanly instincts" whose "present position [was] exceedingly distasteful to her". Reverend Stratton was invited to be listed as Ann Eliza's "next friend" in the divorce case. Judge Hagan believed that Stratton's background as a Methodist minister would validate the indictments against Young and the LDS Church. Stratton refused, however, due to other high-profile legal circumstances, which had forced him to leave his previous ministry in Portland, Oregon. He did not want the additional publicity of Ann Eliza's court case.

Ann Eliza filed for divorce from Young in January 1873, an act that attracted much attention. Her bill for divorce alleged neglect, cruel treatment, and desertion, and claimed that her husband had property worth $8 million and an income exceeding $40,000 a month. Young countered that he owned less than $600,000 in property and that his income was less than $6,000 per month.

=== Excommunication ===
Ann Eliza was excommunicated from the LDS Church on October 10, 1874. The divorce was granted in January 1875, and Young was ordered to pay a $500 per month allowance as well as $3,000 in court fees. When Young initially refused, he was found in contempt of court and sentenced to a day in jail with an additional $25 fine. The alimony award was later set aside on the grounds that the marriage was polygamous and therefore legally invalid. The polygamous nature of the marriage also exposed them to potential indictments for unlawful cohabitation.

After her excommunication, Ann Eliza converted to the Methodist Episcopal faith.

== Advocacy ==
Ann Eliza subsequently traveled the United States and spoke out against polygamy, Mormonism, and Brigham Young. She testified before the U.S. Congress on April 14, 1874. A couple months later, the Poland Act was signed into law, which reorganized the judicial system of the Utah Territory and facilitated the federal prosecution of LDS Church polygamists. In a biographical entry on Brigham Young in American National Biography, Leonard Arrington stated that Ann Eliza's lectures against Young were "influential in the federal antipolygamy legislation of 1882 and 1887".

=== Wife No. 19 ===
In 1876, Ann Eliza published an autobiography titled Wife No. 19. In it, she wrote that she had "a desire to impress upon the world what Mormonism really is; to show the pitiable condition of its women, held in a system of bondage that is more cruel than African slavery ever was, since it claims to hold body and soul alike". Her account of the "horrors of polygamy and masonry" is in the public domain. The autobiography was the basis for Irving Wallace's 1961 biography The Twenty-Seventh Wife and for David Ebershoff's 2008 novel The 19th Wife.

== Third marriage ==
After her divorce from Brigham Young in 1875, Ann Eliza married 53-year-old Moses R. Denning of Manistee, Michigan, a non-Mormon and wealthy logger known to have only one arm. Two years prior to her marriage to Denning, who was married with children at the time, Ann Eliza stayed at his home. Ann Eliza scaled back her crusade against Mormonism and polygamy and stopped delivering lectures the week she married Denning.

=== Divorce from Denning ===
A 1907 article on the 30th anniversary of Brigham Young's death updated the public on his then-surviving widows and stated that Ann Eliza was divorced for the third time and living in Lansing, Michigan. The 1900 U.S. census had reported her living in Breckenridge, Summit County, Colorado. Ann Eliza eventually returned to Utah to claim a $2,000 legacy from her first husband, James Dee.

== Later years ==
In 1908, she published a revised version of Wife No. 19 entitled Life in Mormon Bondage, a revision that excluded any mention of her first marriage to Dee or her third marriage to Denning. By 1910, she had moved to Sparks, Nevada. She eventually became estranged from her family, including her children. One of her grandsons told Wallace that neither of her sons maintained contact with her after they reached early adulthood. In 1930, her older grandson told Wallace, "I hope to hell I never see her again." She died at her home in Sparks of pneumonia, related to old age, and was buried on December 9, 1917, in Mountain View Cemetery, Reno, Nevada.

== Published works ==
- Young, Ann Eliza (1876). Wife No. 19, or The Story of a Life in Bondage; Being a Complete Exposé of Mormonism, and Revealing the Sorrows, Sacrifices and Sufferings of Women in Polygamy. Hartford, Connecticut: Dustin, Gilman & Co.

== See also ==
- Celestial marriage
- Current state of polygamy in the Latter Day Saint movement
- History of civil marriage in the United States
- Latter Day Saint polygamy in the late 19th century
- Polygamy in North America
