= Courthouse (TV series) =

American drama television series

- Genre: Drama
- Created by: Deborah Joy LeVine
- Written by: Ian Biederman; Dennis Cooper; Dan Levine; Deborah Joy LeVine; Roger Lowenstein; Gina Prince-Bythewood
- Directed by: Ron Lagomarsino; Michael Fields; James Frawley; Dan Lerner; Alan J. Levi; Martha Mitchell; James Quinn; Jesús Salvador Treviño
- Starring: Patricia Wettig; Annabeth Gish; Robin Givens; Bob Gunton; Brad Johnson; Michael Lerner; Jenifer Lewis; Nia Peeples; Jeffrey D. Sams
- Composer: Jay Gruska
- Country of origin: United States
- Original language: English
- No. of seasons: 1
- No. of episodes: 11 (2 unaired)

Production
- Executive producer: Deborah Joy LeVine
- Producers: Dan Levine; Vahan Moosekian
- Cinematography: Michael Gershman
- Editors: Susan B. Browdy; David Post; Ron Rosen
- Running time: 60 minutes (with commercials)
- Production companies: Kedzie Productions; Columbia Pictures Television

Original release
- Network: CBS
- Release: September 13 – November 15, 1995

Courthouse is an American drama television series that ran on CBS from September 13 to November 15, 1995. The series was created and executive-produced by Deborah Joy LeVine. The Courthouse plot centered on a tough female judge, and was partially inspired by NYPD Blue and the television coverage of the O. J. Simpson murder case. Patricia Wettig led the cast which also included Bob Gunton and Robin Givens. Wettig intended to leave the show due to "creative differences", with sources saying that she wanted the show to be more of a star vehicle for her, rather than an ensemble cast, but the show was cancelled before her character could be written out.

The show included Jenifer Lewis and Cree Summer as the first recurring African American lesbian characters on TV, but the role was ordered to be toned down for broadcast. Lewis played Juvenile Court judge Rosetta Reide, who was having a relationship with her housekeeper Danny Gates (played by Summer).

The show failed to catch on with audiences, the pilot ranked 47 out of 108 shows, according to the Nielsen ratings for that week, with 9.2 million viewers (16% share), and it was cancelled two months after it premiered. One critic described the show as "a hopeless amalgam that strains the senses".

== Plot ==
Courthouse is a TV drama with significant sexual and violent content; it follows the lives of the judges and lawyers and all the staff at a big-city courthouse in fictional Clark County. The court has a limited budget and an overcrowded case load, and the courthouse itself is falling into disrepair.

The court is led by the no-nonsense presiding judge, Justine Parkes. Wyatt Jackson, a new judge, arrives from Montana. Jackson gets off to a shaky start with Parkes as he is not used to the way big city courts are run, but there is a hint of romantic tension between the two.

There are several romantic couplings among the staff, including an interracial coupling of two prosecutors in Moore and Graham and a lesbian affair between Judge Reide and her housekeeper.

New York magazine described the show as follows:

"Ready to believe in Robin Givens as a tireless defender of public justice? Courthouse's idea of gritty moral realism is to divide the world into the good and the bad: Bad judges go to the opera while their charges die in jail; good judges have interracial affairs with members of their own gender; and the best judge of all rolls in from Montana looking like he just shot a 501 commercial".

== Cast ==
=== Main ===
- Patricia Wettig as Judge Justine Parkes, the no-nonsense presiding judge
- Annabeth Gish as Lenore Laderman, a naive young prosecutor just reassigned to the sex crimes unit
- Robin Givens as Suzanne Graham, an investigator for the D.A.'s office
- Bob Gunton as Judge Homer Conklin, an autocratic "hanging judge" and a by-the-book traditionalist
- Brad Johnson as Judge Wyatt E. Jackson, a hunky, non-conformist recently arrived from Montana
- Michael Lerner as Judge Myron Winkleman, a neurotic Family Court judge
- Jenifer Lewis as Judge Rosetta Reide, a struggling, gay single mother presiding over Juvenile Court
- Nia Peeples as Veronica Gilbert, a public defender, who is dating Mitchell
- Jeffrey D. Sams as Edison Moore, the hard-charging young prosecutor in a secret romantic relationship with Graham

=== Recurring ===
- Dan Gauthier as Jonathan Mitchell, a conceited prosecutor, who is dating public defender Gilbert
- Cree Summer as Danny Gates, the housekeeper and lesbian girlfriend of Judge Reide

Other cast members included Jacqueline Kim, Shelley Morrison, Roma Maffia, Christopher Michael, Larry Joshua, Kelly Rutherford, Cotter Smith, George Newbern, David L. Crowley and John Mese.

== Episodes ==
| No. | Title | Directed by | Written by | Original release date | US viewers (millions) |
|---|---|---|---|---|---|
| 1 | "Pilot" | Ron Lagomarsino | Deborah Joy LeVine | September 13, 1995 | 9.2 |
| 2 | "One Flew Over the Courthouse" | Bill D'Ella | Deborah Joy Levine & Dennis Cooper | September 20, 1995 | 7 |
| 3 | "Conflict of Interest" | Unknown | Ian Biederman | September 27, 1995 | 5.7 |
| 4 | "Order on the Court" | Alan J. Levi | Gina Prince | October 10, 1995 | 7 |
| 5 | "Sex, Law and Videotape" | Dan Lerner | Dan Levine | October 11, 1995 | 7.3 |
| 6 | "Child Support" | Jesús Salvador Treviño | Ian Biederman | October 18, 1995 | 6.3 |
| 7 | "One Strike and You're Out" | James A. Contner | Roger Lowenstein | November 1, 1995 | 5.4 |
| 8 | "Fair-Weathered Friends" | James Quinn | Gina Prince | November 8, 1995 | 5.8 |
| 9 | "Injustice for All" | Martha Mitchell | Dennis Cooper & Deborah Joy LeVine | November 15, 1995 | 5.1 |
| 10 | "Mitigating Circumstances" | N/A | N/A | Unaired | N/A |
| 11 | "Justice Delayed" | N/A | N/A | Unaired | N/A |
