= The Danish Girl (film) =

2015 film by Tom Hooper

- Theatrical release poster
- Directed by: Tom Hooper
- Written by: Lucinda Coxon
- Based on: The Danish Girl by David Ebershoff
- Produced by: Tim Bevan; Eric Fellner; Anne Harrison; Tom Hooper; Gail Mutrux
- Starring: Eddie Redmayne; Alicia Vikander; Ben Whishaw; Sebastian Koch; Amber Heard; Matthias Schoenaerts
- Cinematography: Danny Cohen
- Edited by: Melanie Oliver
- Music by: Alexandre Desplat
- Production companies: Working Title Films; Artemis Productions; Amber Entertainment; Revision Pictures; Senator Global Productions; Pretty Pictures
- Distributed by: Focus Features (United States); Universal Pictures (International)
- Release dates: 5 September 2015 (Venice); 27 November 2015 (United States); 1 January 2016 (United Kingdom)
- Running time: 120 minutes
- Countries: United Kingdom; United States
- Language: English
- Budget: $15 million
- Box office: $67.5 million

The Danish Girl is a 2015 biographical romantic drama film directed by Tom Hooper, based on the 2000 novel of the same title by David Ebershoff, and loosely inspired by the lives of Danish painters Lili Elbe and Gerda Wegener. The film stars Eddie Redmayne as Elbe, one of the first known recipients of gender-affirming surgery, Alicia Vikander as Gerda Wegener, and Sebastian Koch as Kurt Warnekros, with Ben Whishaw, Amber Heard, and Matthias Schoenaerts in supporting roles.

The film participated in the main competition of the 72nd Venice International Film Festival, and it was shown in the Special Presentations section of the 2015 Toronto International Film Festival. The film had a limited release on 27 November 2015 by Focus Features in the United States. The film was released on 1 January 2016 in the United Kingdom, with Universal Pictures handling international distribution.

In spite of criticism for inaccurate portrayal of historical events, Redmayne and Vikander's performances received widespread acclaim and nominations for multiple acting awards. Vikander won the Academy Award for Best Supporting Actress and Redmayne was nominated for the Academy Award for Best Actor, while the film received additional Academy Award nominations for Best Production Design and Best Costume Design at the 88th Academy Awards. At the 69th British Academy Film Awards, The Danish Girl received five BAFTA Award nominations, including BAFTA Award for Best British Film.

== Plot ==
In 1920s Copenhagen, portrait artist Gerda Wegener is attending an art show to support her husband, popular landscape artist and closeted trans woman Einar Wegener. Though Gerda is talented, she hasn't quite received the same success Einar has. The following day Gerda shows some of her work to a Museum curator but he's unfortunately unimpressed. When she returns home, she asks Einar to stand in for a female model, who is running late, to pose for a painting Gerda is working on. The experience of posing for Gerda's painting creates a string of events that brings out more of Einar's feminine identity, who is eventually named Lili.

The following day, Gerda mentions going to an artist ball, but when Einar refuses to go, she suggests that he go as someone else, namely Lili, and he agrees. They spend a few days preparing Einar, learning female mannerisms and donning him with make-up, new clothes and a woman's wig. All of which helps to bring out more of Lili's identity, but Gerda misinterprets it as a game. At the ball, Lili ends up spending the night talking with Henrik Sandahl. When Gerda looks for her, she sees the two of them kissing. When she confronts Einar about it the next morning, he says Henrik was kissing Lili.

Gerda shows the curator her new portraits of Lili and to her surprise, he agrees to show them. Lili goes to visit Henrik at his home and begins kissing him but when he calls her "Einar" she leaves devastated. When Gerda comes home, Lili tells her about Henrik and while Gerda sits at the table heartbroken, Lili turns back into Einar. She assures her that Einar has no romantic feelings for Henrik but Lili does, she also tells her that as a child Lili kissed a boy named Hans until Lili's father caught them. Afterwards, Gerda takes Lili to see Doctor Hexler who opts to treat Lili with radiation but after the procedure, Lili tells him he "hurt Lili". Hexler, convinced that Lili is insane, wants to have her admitted into an insane asylum on grounds of perversion.

Lili and Gerda relocate to Paris; Gerda's portraits of Lili in her feminine state attract serious attention from art dealers in a way that Gerda's previous portraits did not. Gerda tracks down art dealer Hans Axgil, Lili's childhood friend (whom Lili had kissed when they were young). Hans and Gerda's mutual attraction is a challenge as Gerda is navigating her changing relationship with Lili. Hans' long-time friendship with and affection for Lili causes him to support Lili and Gerda.

As Lili's gender identity becomes more challenging, and under the advice of Hans, Lili tries to seek help from psychologists, all of which are unhelpful with some believing her to be either homosexual or mentally ill. Eventually, at Ulla Poulsen's recommendation, Lili and Gerda meet Dr. Kurt Warnekros. Dr. Warnekros explains that he has met other transgender women. He proposes an innovative and controversial solution for Lili: male-to-female sex reassignment surgery.

He also mentions that this is the second time he has offered this surgery, but the first patient got too nervous and left before the surgery began.

This would entail a two-part procedure that involves first removing Lili's external genitalia and then, after a period of recovery, fashioning a vagina. He warns Lili and Gerda that it is a very dangerous operation which has never been attempted before, and Lili would be one of the first to undergo it. Lili immediately agrees and, soon after, travels to Germany without Gerda to begin the surgery.

Gerda stays behind for a while but ultimately decides she should be by Lili's side. After Gerda helps Lili heal, Lili begins working in a department store selling women's perfume. After enough time has passed, Lili decides it is time to go for the second surgery, much to Gerda's distress. Lili again leaves alone.

Gerda again shows up after the surgery is complete, but Lili is pale and weak but insists she be taken out to the garden again. Lili dies of complications from the second surgery with a heartbroken Gerda by her side. After her death, Gerda and Hans travel to a hilltop back in Denmark where Hans and Lili grew up, seeing all the landscapes that she painted, revealing that all of LiLi's paintings have always been connected to Lili.

The scarf that Lili had originally given Gerda, which had subsequently been given back and forth several times, is carried away in the wind, dancing.

== Cast ==
- Eddie Redmayne as Lili Elbe
- Alicia Vikander as Gerda Wegener (née Gottlieb)
- Matthias Schoenaerts as Hans Axgil (Fernando Porta)
- Ben Whishaw as Henrik Sandahl (Claude Lejeune)
- Amber Heard as Ulla Poulsen
- Sebastian Koch as Dr. Kurt Warnekros
- Pip Torrens as Dr. Jens Hexler
- Nicholas Woodeson as Dr. Buson
- Emerald Fennell as Elsa
- Adrian Schiller as Rasmussen
- Henry Pettigrew as Niels
- Pixie as Hvappe, the Jack Russell dog

== Production ==
=== Development ===
Screenwriter Lucinda Coxon worked on the screenplay for a decade before it was produced. She told Creative Screenwriting:

I started in 2004 and within a couple of years we had a script we were happy to send out. We were terribly excited and I was fantastically naïve because when you fall in love with a project, you assume that everyone else will be in love with it as well. The actors were very much in love with it. Several well-known actresses wanted to play Gerda, but the subject matter made it quite difficult to find someone to play Lili. We scheduled various directors and with each director came a new draft.

In September 2009, Tomas Alfredson revealed to Variety that production on the project would precede that of his upcoming Tinker Tailor Soldier Spy adaptation, adding: "We have been in talks for close to a year, and we are soon going into production". In December 2009, Swedish newspapers reported that Alfredson was no longer attached to direct The Danish Girl and would begin work on Tinker Tailor Soldier Spy next. Alfredson said he regretted that reports of him working on The Danish Girl spread before the deal was finalized. He also said that he still wanted to make the film and might return to the project.

On 12 January 2010, Swedish director Lasse Hallström told Swedish media that he had been assigned to replace Alfredson as director.

=== Casting ===
In 2008, Nicole Kidman was originally attached to play Lili and produce the film through her company Blossom Films. Charlize Theron was originally slated to play the role of Gerda Wegener but, after leaving the project, was replaced by Gwyneth Paltrow. Paltrow then left the project due to location changes. Uma Thurman was also a rumoured replacement. In September 2010, Marion Cotillard was rumored to be the lead candidate for the role of Gerda Wegener.

On 11 June 2010, The Hollywood Reporter revealed that the film had received €1.2 million ($1.5 million) in subsidy financing from Germany's NRW Film Board. The conditions of the deal included the planned 19-day shoot in Germany. In February 2011, Screen Daily reported that the film would begin shooting in July of the same year and that Rachel Weisz would play Wegener. In May, it was revealed that both Weisz and Hallström had left the project.

On 28 April 2014, it was announced that Tom Hooper would direct the film with Eddie Redmayne as the lead. While filming Jupiter Ascending, Redmayne spoke with Lana Wachowski, saying she "told me where to start reading, and where to start educating myself" about Gerda and Lili. On 19 June 2014, Alicia Vikander was announced in the cast. On 8 January 2015, Matthias Schoenaerts joined the cast.

=== Filming ===
Filming was projected to start in Spring 2010 in Berlin. Coxon revealed to Creative Screenwriting that, when filming finally began with Hooper, he actually filmed an older version of the script:

We had probably gone through 20 drafts before landing Tom Hooper. In fact, the one we shot was actually an early revised draft that Tom had read back in 2008. I did a fairly large rewrite for Tom, but in the end, we used a version with little revision from the original.

Filming began in February 2015, and also took place at Nyhavn, where the iconic waterfront was transformed to look like Copenhagen in the 1930s. Sets for the Danish and Paris flats were built in the Elstree Studios near London and additional shooting took place in Copenhagen and Brussels. Production on the film concluded on 12 April 2015. Filming took 44 days for the 186 scenes in six countries.

=== Post-production ===
Post-production ended in September 2015. According to composer Alexandre Desplat, post-production was very fast, with the film being cut as Desplat was writing the score, which was recorded only a week prior to the film's premiere at the Venice Film Festival.

Hooper revealed to IndieWire and After Ellen that the film's ending is different from the novel (in which Gerda and Hans stay together) and real life (Gerda and Lili were not together in Lili's final days), and he de-emphasized the importance of the Hans storyline because he did not want to feel that there was a love possibility for Gerda with Hans that could in any way rival Lili. He wanted it to be ambiguous whether it would turn into a love affair, rather than a friendship because he saw Lili and Gerda as the loves of each other's lives. He took the script in that direction to protect the importance of their relationship.

In an interview with MTV International, Vikander revealed that two scenes featuring Amber Heard dancing were cut from the film, as well as stating the first cut for the film was over 2 hours.

== Release ==
On 4 March 2015, Focus Features set the film for a limited release on 27 November 2015. The film had its world premiere at the 72nd Venice Film Festival on 5 September 2015. Universal Pictures handled distribution in other territories outside the U.S., with a release on 1 January 2016 in the United Kingdom.

=== Home media ===
The film was released on DVD and Blu-ray on 1 March 2016 in the United States.

=== Marketing ===
The first image of Redmayne as Lili Elbe was revealed on 26 February 2015. A pair of posters of Redmayne and Vikander were then released in August. On 1 September 2015, the first trailer was released. On 19 November 2015, the first clip from the film was released.

== Reception ==
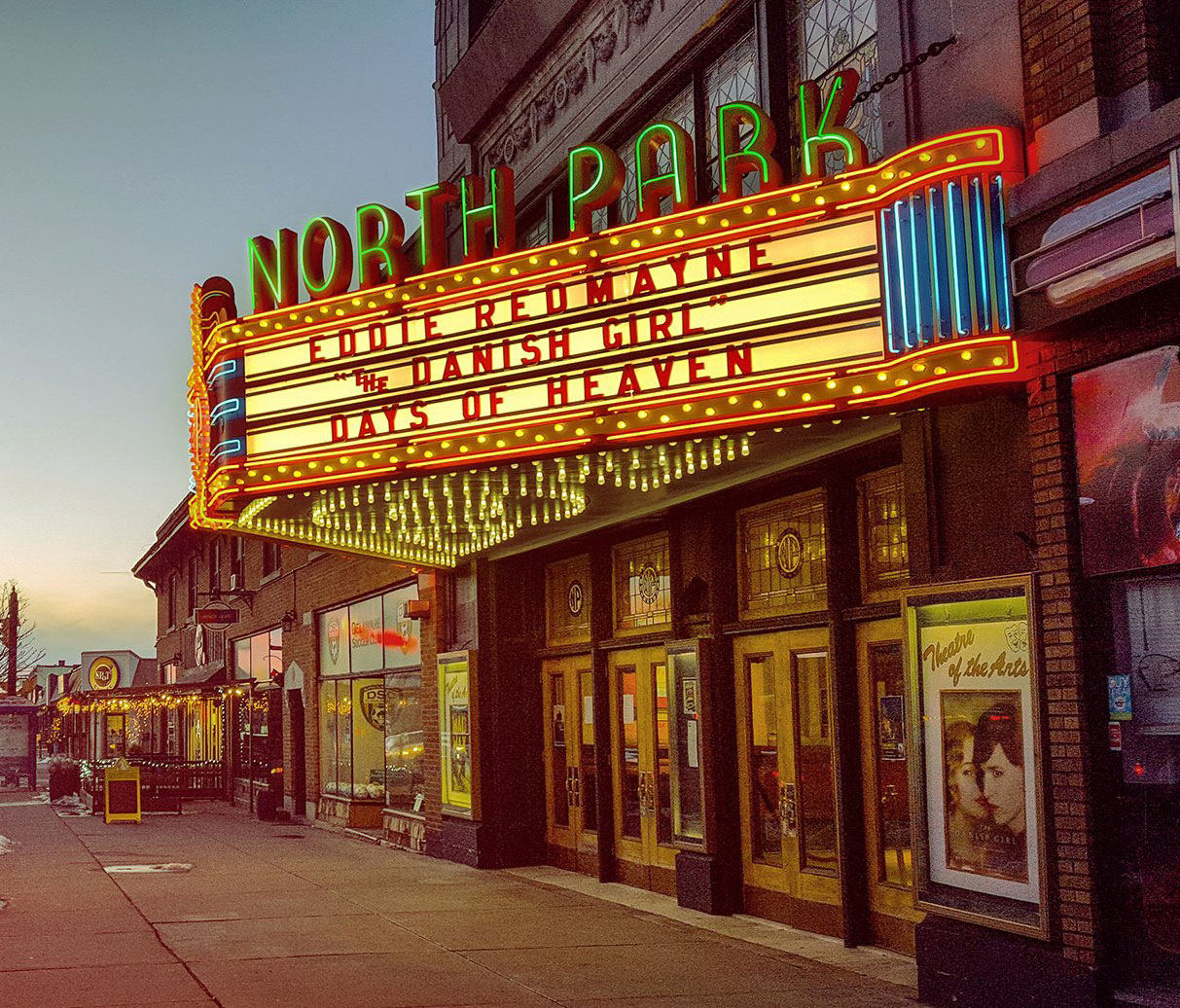
Buffalo, New York theater showing the film

=== Box office ===
The Danish Girl has grossed $11.1 million in North America and $56.4 million in other territories for a worldwide total of $67.5 million, against a budget of $15 million.

The film had a limited release in the United States and Canada across four cinemas in New York and Los Angeles on 27 November 2015 before expanding cinemas in December. The film earned $185,000 in its opening weekend, averaging $46,250, which is the sixth-best opening weekend per cinema average of 2015. The opening weekend’s audience was 58% female, and 67% were over 40.

=== Critical response ===
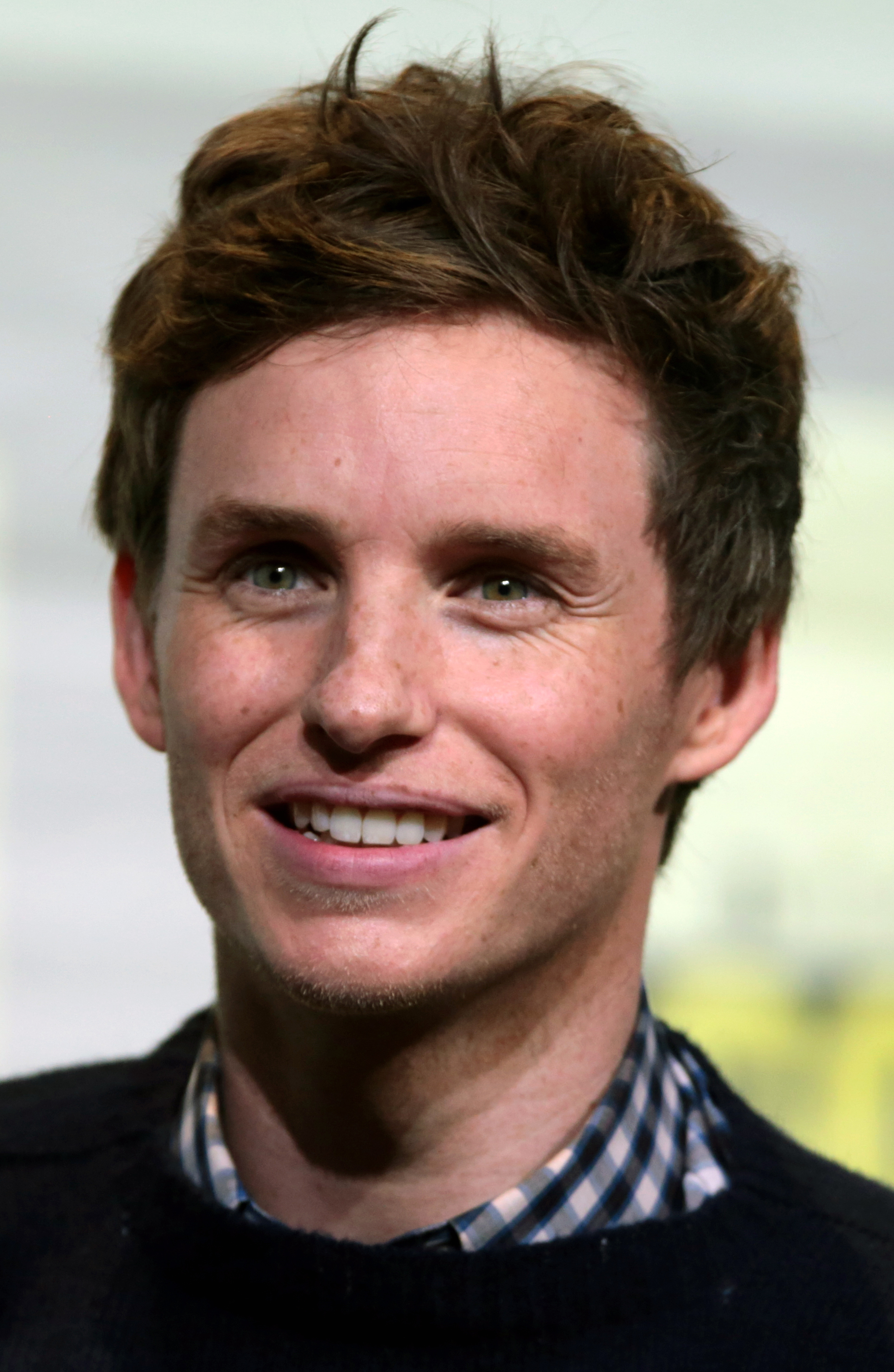
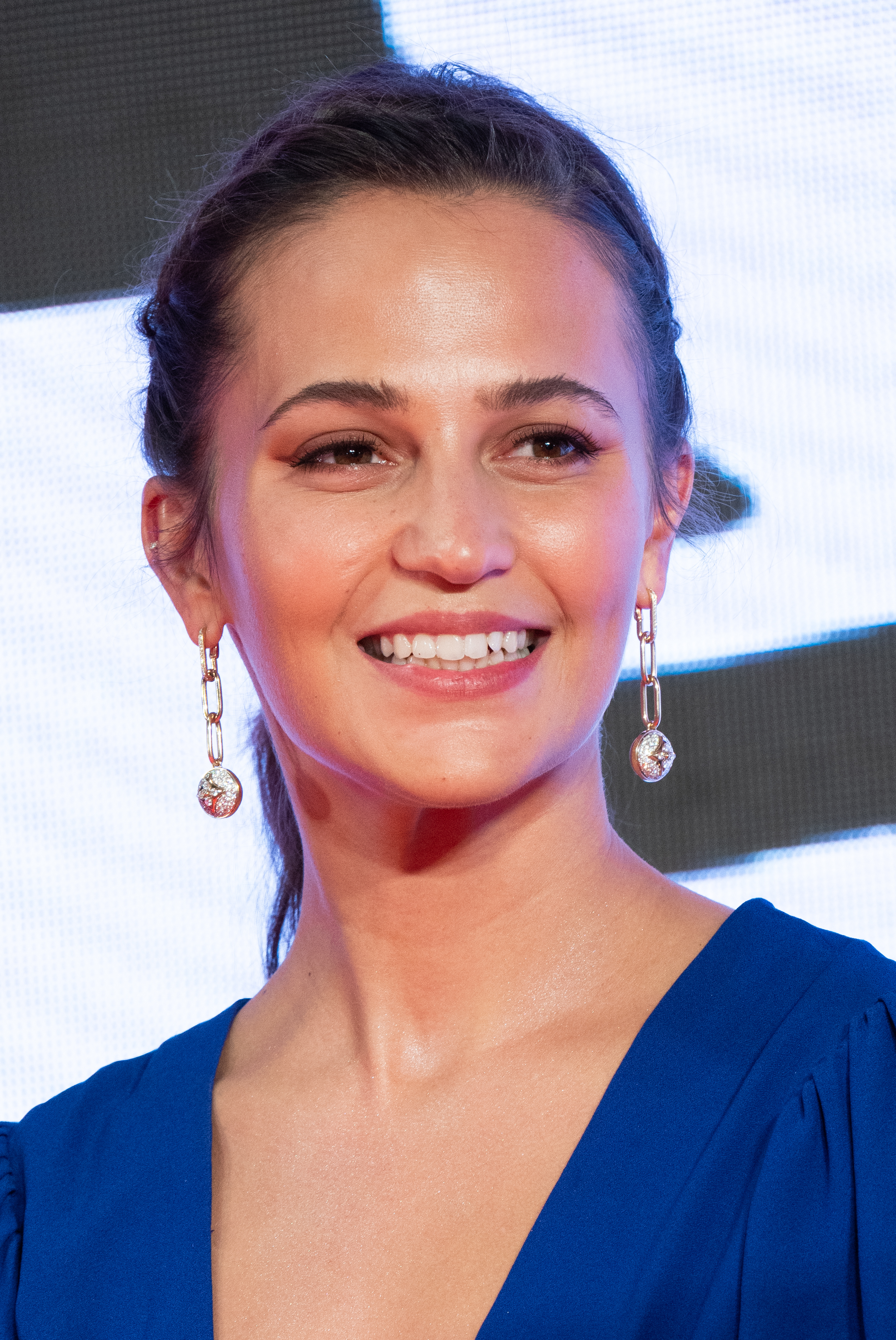
The performances of Eddie Redmayne and Alicia Vikander received critical acclaim, earning them Academy Award nominations for Best Actor and Best Supporting Actress respectively, with Vikander winning her category.

On Rotten Tomatoes, the film has an approval rating of 66% based on 245 reviews, with an average rating of 6.6/10. The website's critical consensus reads, "The Danish Girl serves as another showcase for Eddie Redmayne's talent—and poignantly explores thought-provoking themes with a beautifully filmed biopic drama." On Metacritic, the film has a weighted average score of 66 out of 100, based on 41 critics, indicating "generally favorable reviews".

Independent film website FilmDebate credited The Danish Girl as the "most important film of 2015," stating that: "This is not only the best movie of the year, but it is the most important. The story and performances come together in the truest of ways to make a film that the whole world needs to see and get behind."

The film's acting, particularly that of Redmayne and Vikander in the lead roles, received considerable acclaim, with Marie Asner of Phantom Tollbooth stating that "the acting is what makes this film". Redmayne's performance was described as "another sterling example of just how deeply he can immerse himself into a role" by Jim Schembri of 3AW, and as "revealing, heartbreaking and believable" by Linda Cook of Quad-City Times.

Kyle Buchanan, writing for Vulture, complained that it was part of a trend of "queer and trans films that are actually about straight people", while Paul Byrnes for The Sydney Morning Herald said it was "a lost opportunity" in which "the frocks are more convincing than the emotions." Casey Plett, a transgender writer, criticised the script in a conversation in The Walrus as "atrocious and boring", going on to say "It's like someone got inspired by a Shakespeare tragedy, then combined the verbosity of R. L. Stine with the subtlety of Brendan Fraser."

== Controversies ==
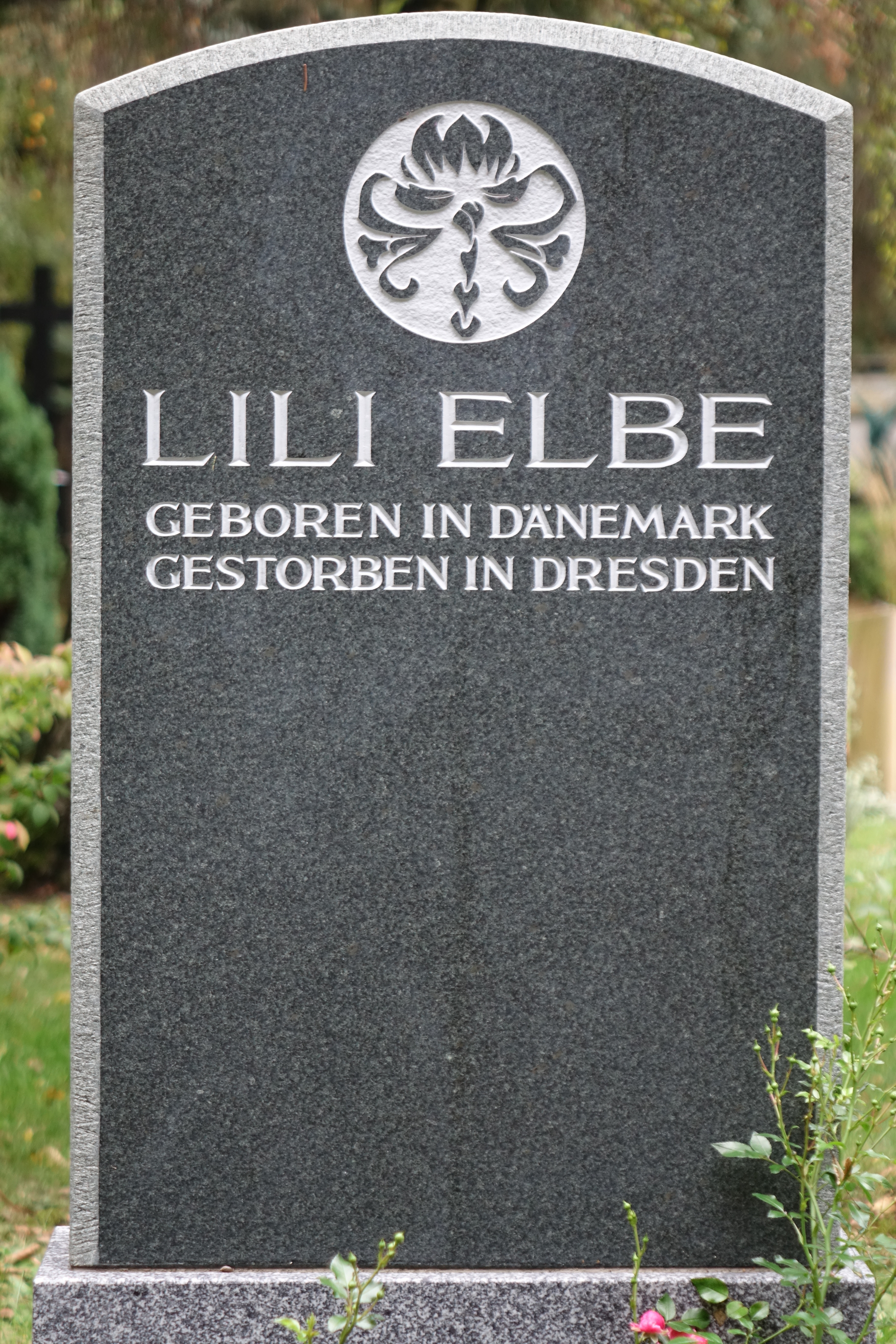
Focus Features funded the renovation of Lili Elbes' grave in Dresden

The Danish Girl has been criticised as being written similarly to forced feminization erotica, obscuring the actual story of a historical transgender woman, and for being based on a fictional book that does not tell the true story of Elbe and Wegener. Additionally, it was criticised for casting Redmayne, a cisgender man, in the role of a transgender woman. Redmayne acknowledged this criticism in an interview with IndieWire around the time of the film's 2015 release, calling it an "incredibly important discussion".

In a 2018 GQ interview, Redmayne said he was unsure in retrospect if he should have accepted the role. He stated in 2021 that he regretted it, stating, "I made that film with the best intentions, but I think it was a mistake. The bigger discussion about the frustrations around casting is because many people don’t have a chair at the table. There must be a leveling, otherwise, we are going to carry on having these debates."

In a 2025 interview with British Vogue, Vikander admitted that the film "already feels extremely dated, which I think is a good thing. At that time, it was a pivot in something that it made [the subject of transgender lives] at least discussed. I hope that in a way it was a bit of an eye-opener and opened the way for art to cover those themes."

=== Oscar category controversy ===
Alicia Vikander was awarded the Academy Award for Best Supporting Actress for her role in the film, the film's only Oscar win out of the four nominations. The Academy was criticised for nominating Vikander's performance for Best Supporting Actress, as Vikander has about one hour of screen-time, which is 50% of the film's run-time, which qualified her for consideration in the Best Actress category. The film's distributor Focus Features had campaigned in support of Vikander in the Supporting Actress category, in which many lead actresses have been nominated and won. She was intentionally not shortlisted in the Best Actress category as she would have been competing against Brie Larson for her role in Room, which would have decreased her chances of winning while the Supporting Actress category had less competition. At both the Golden Globe Awards and the British Academy Awards, Vikander's performance in The Danish Girl was nominated for Best Actress and she was included in the Best Supporting Actress category for her work in Ex Machina. (She lost both awards to Kate Winslet for Steve Jobs.)

=== Historical inaccuracy ===
- The film is based on the novel The Danish Girl by David Ebershoff, and as such may duplicate some fictionalized or speculative content of the novel. However, director Tom Hooper has stated that the film is closer to the true story than Ebershoff's book.
- Lili and Gerda moved to Paris in 1912, but the film appears to imply they moved to Paris in the late 1920s. Paris was remarkably liberal in the 1910s and 1920s, which is the reason why Gerda and Lili settled there and Gerda lived openly as a lesbian in the city. The scene in which Lili, dressed in men's clothes, is beaten by two men in Paris after being assumed to be a lesbian is fictional.
- Lili's post-transition name was Lili Ilse Elvenes. The name "Lili Elbe", the only name used in the film, was made up by Copenhagen journalist Louise "Loulou" Lassen.
- Gerda divorced from Porta in 1936, did not have children, and never married again. She returned to Denmark, took to drinking, and died penniless in 1940. The character Hans Axgil did not exist in her life and was merely a loose inspiration from Porta, though the real Fernando Porta was not a childhood friend of Lili. The surname Axgil is a reference to the Danish couple Axel and Eigil Axgil, the first gay couple ever to enter into a registered partnership.
- Elbe died from organ rejection due to a uterus transplant (her fifth operation) in 1931, at the age of 48, but in the film she dies after the second sex reassignment surgery.

=== Bans ===
The film was banned by Qatar on the grounds of "moral depravity", and also in the United Arab Emirates, Oman, Bahrain, Jordan, Kuwait, and Malaysia.

== See also ==
- List of feature films with transgender characters
- List of lesbian, gay, bisexual or transgender-related films of 2015
