= Deborah Joy LeVine =

American television writer and producer

Deborah Joy LeVine is an American television writer and producer who wrote the TV series Lois & Clark: The New Adventures of Superman, which ran from 1993 to 1997.

== Filmography ==
- Murder: By Reason of Insanity (associate producer) (1985)
- Samaritan: The Mitch Snyder Story (producer) (1986)
- Equal Justice (writer) (1990–1991) (executive story consultant) (1991)
- Something to Live for: The Alison Gertz Story (writer) (1992)
- Lois & Clark: The New Adventures of Superman (creator, writer, co-executive/executive producer, executive consultant) (1993–1997)
- Courthouse (creator, writer, executive producer) (1995)
- Early Edition (writer, executive producer) (1996–1997)
- Dawson's Creek (executive producer) (1998)
- Any Day Now (creator, writer, executive producer) (1998)
- The Division (creator, writer, executive producer) (2001–2004)
- Class Actions (executive producer) (2004)
- Beautiful People (creative consultant, writer) (2005)
- Kaya (creator, writer, executive producer) (2007)
- Mental (creator, writer, executive producer) (2009)
