= Sebastian Koch =

German actor (born 1962)

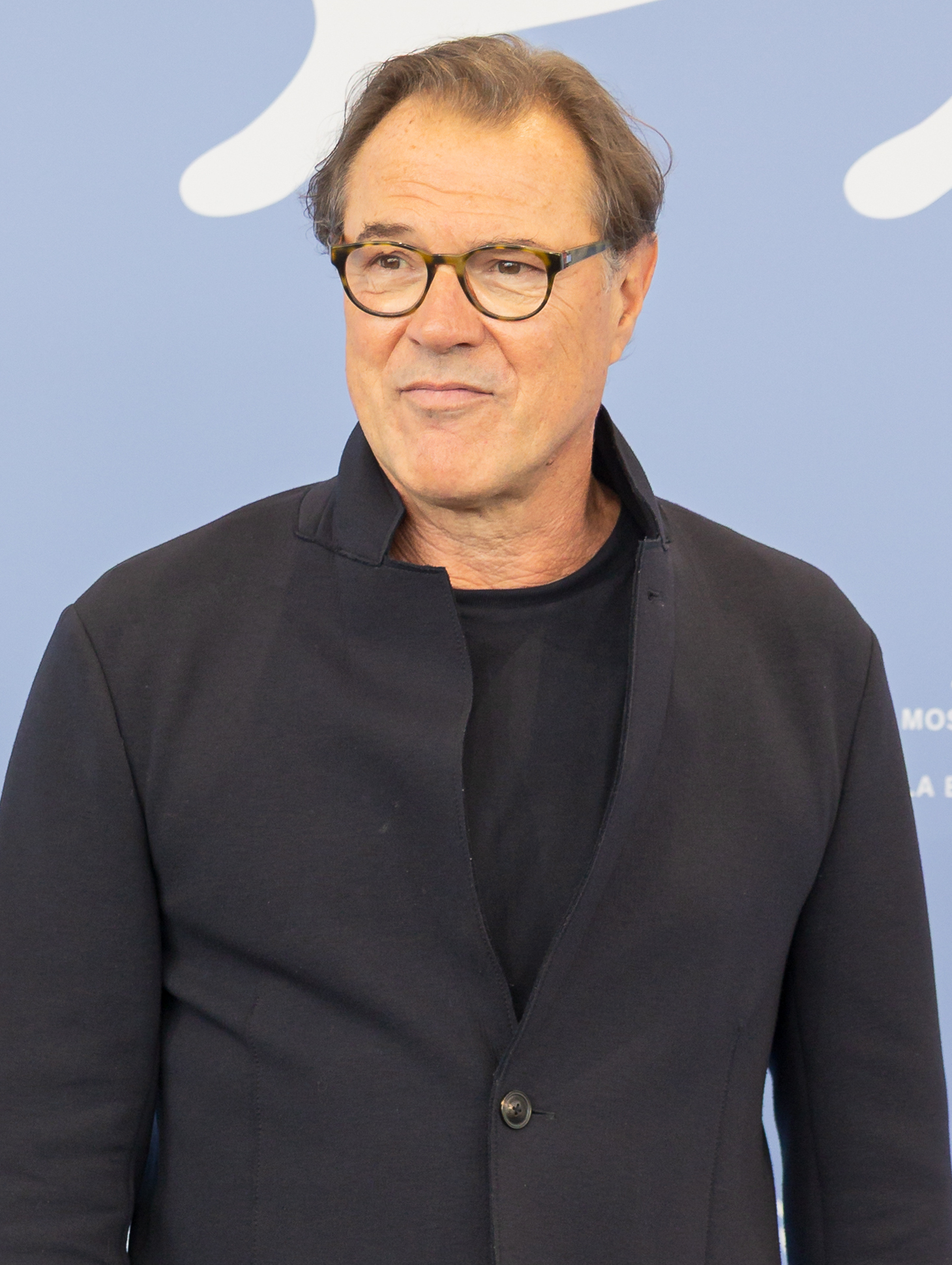
- Koch in 2025
- Born: 31 May 1962 (age 64); Karlsruhe, Baden-Württemberg, West Germany
- Occupation: Actor
- Years active: 1990–present
- Partner: Carice van Houten (2005–2009)
- Children: 2
- Website: www.sebastiankoch.com

Sebastian Koch is a German television and film actor. He is known for roles in the 2007 Academy Award-winning film The Lives of Others, Black Book (film), in Steven Spielberg's Bridge of Spies, and as Otto Düring in the fifth season of the Showtime series Homeland.

== Early life and education ==
Sebastian Koch was born in 1962 in Karlsruhe, Baden-Württemberg, West Germany. He grew up in Stuttgart with his mother, a single parent.

He originally wanted to be a musician, but a production by artistic director Claus Peymann influenced him in the late 1970s to change careers to become an actor. From 1982 to 1985, Koch studied at the Otto Falckenberg School of the Performing Arts in Munich.

== Career ==
=== Theatre ===
Koch has played many different roles on stage. He acted in Peer Gynt and Leonce in Leonce and Lena at the municipal theatre of Darmstadt.

At the Schiller Theatre in Berlin he played the character Roller in Schiller's The Robbers and Orest in Goethe's Iphigenie auf Tauris.

He also took over the role of Lord Goring in Oscar Wilde's An Ideal Husband in the Bochum Playhouse, under the direction of Armin Holz.

=== Film and television ===
Koch had his first TV appearance in 1980 in the 77th episode of the series Derrick, followed by an episode in the popular crime series Tatort in 1986. He acted in numerous thrillers like Der Mann mit der Maske, Die brennende Schnecke, and in 1997 in Heinrich Breloer's two-piece Death Game, in which he portrayed the role of Andreas Baader.

For the title role in Dance with the Devil and for his performance as the writer Klaus Mann in Heinrich Breloer's docudrama The Manns – A Novel of the Century, in 2002 he won the Adolf Grimme Award. He also received the Bavarian TV Award for the same movie.

His first international productions included the historical drama series Napoleon, in which he appeared alongside Gérard Depardieu, John Malkovich, and Isabella Rossellini. He also portrayed the youthful lover of Catherine Deneuve, Rodolphe Löwenstein, in Marie und Freud.

Koch has portrayed other historically significant personalities, including Rudolf Höss in Costa-Gavras' adaptation Amen (Der Stellvertreter). He appeared in The Tunnel, a 2001 made-for-television German film about the idea of going underground by digging a tunnel shortly after the construction of the Berlin Wall in 1961, and in Peter Keglevic’s historical drama Two Days of Hope about the uprising on 17 June 1953. Koch appeared in Stauffenberg (2004, by Jo Baier and winner of the German Film Award). He played Albert Speer in Heinrich Breoler's mini-series Speer und Er in 2004 – his third collaboration with the director following Death Game and The Manns – A Novel of the Century, receiving the German TV Award for his performance.

Koch appeared in Florian Henckel von Donnersmarck's drama The Lives of Others in 2006 as one of the leading roles. He portrayed the playwright Georg Dreyman, who lived in East Germany with his lover, a dissident who was spied on and monitored. The movie received an Oscar for Best Foreign Language Film in 2007 as well as several other major prizes. Koch himself was nominated several times for his work in the film, receiving the Globo d'oro for Best European Actor, The Quadriga, and the Bambi Award.

Paul Verhoeven's movie Black Book (Zwartboek) was also shot in 2006. Koch played a Nazi officer in occupied Holland who falls in love with a Jewish member of the resistance (Carice van Houten).

After shooting the movie In jeder Sekunde in 2007/2008, Koch appeared on camera for the international production of Jack London's classic psychological adventure novel Sea Wolf, where Koch portrayed a lone despot of both brutal cruelty and longing romance. The shooting of this two-parter based on Nigel Williams’ script and under Mike Barker’s direction took place in Halifax, Canada. The mini-series won the Directors Guild of Canada Award and Koch was nominated in 2010 for an Emmy Award for his role as Wolf Larsen.

The shooting of the movie Manipulation (adapted from the novel Das Verhör des Harry Wind) took place in 2008, with Koch and Klaus Maria Brandauer playing leading roles.

In 2010, Koch was the male title role in the English independent tragicomedy Albatross under the direction of Niall MacCormick. He played the role of Prof. Bressler in the movie Unknown (with Liam Neeson and Diane Kruger) under the direction of Jaume Collet-Serra. In the summer of 2010, he took a guest role alongside Eva Green and Joseph Fiennes in the Irish RT Film TV series Camelot, followed by the UFA production Bella Block – Stich ins Herz - under the direction of Stephan Wagner, in which Koch played the role of Max Klöckner. As a host of the ZDF production Terra X, Koch presented the Cologne Cathedral, the Neuschwanstein Castle, and the Dresden Frauenkirche.

In 2011, Koch appeared in the Czech production of In the Shadow (Ve stínu), in which Koch played the leading role of the German police investigator Zenke, who is held as a prisoner-of-war in 1953 communist Czechoslovakia and agrees to participate in a political show trial in exchange for being repatriated to West Germany. In the German production adapted from Bernhard Schlink's novel The Weekend in 2012, Koch portrays an amnestied RAF terrorist (Jens Kessler), who has a reunion with his old mates. In the same year, Koch began shooting the Greek-Russian drama film God Loves Caviar based upon the true story of Ioannis Varvakis, played by Koch, a former pirate who moved up to being a Greek caviar merchant and eventual benefactor from Psara. The international cast also included Catherine Deneuve as Catherine the Great of Russia and John Cleese as Officer McCormick. Furthermore, Koch played the title role in Suspension of Disbelief, a thriller by Mike Figgis, which was followed by part 5 of the Die Hard movies, with Koch as Bruce Willis' antagonist.

In 2013, Ridley Scott (director and producer) began working on The Vatican, a pilot episode for a Showtime series about intrigues concerning the Pope and mysteries and secrets within the Catholic Church. Koch played the role of the Vatican's secretary Cardinal Marco Malerba, who is one of the true potentates of the inner circle.

In the Austrian production Madame Nobel Koch portrayed Alfred Nobel in 2014, and in the French production Au nom de ma fille, based on a true story, Koch played Dieter Krombach, a German doctor who is accused of murdering his stepdaughter by her biological French father (played by Daniel Auteuil). The case had spanned 30 years and has caused considerable publicity because of the issues of French-German relations and vigilante justice it raised.

In 2014, Koch was also part of Steven Spielberg's historical dramatic thriller Bridge of Spies about the negotiations of the release of spies between the East and West. Lawyer James B. Donovan (Tom Hanks) is thrown into the centre of the Cold War and East German lawyer Wolfgang Vogel (Koch) is a key figure in the process. The film premiered at the New York Film Festival and was nominated for the 2016 Academy Award for Best Picture.

The biographical romantic drama film The Danish Girl by Academy Award winner Tom Hooper (The King's Speech) is about one of the first known recipients of sex reassignment surgery. Koch portrays Kurt Warnekros, a doctor at the Dresden Municipal Women's Clinic, who was one of the first to carry out such operations. The cast furthermore includes Eddie Redmayne and Alicia Vikander.

Subsequently, Koch filmed Fog in August (by director Kai Wessel), the first feature film to address the Nazis' euthanasia program and the hospital's staunch Nazi chief physician Werner Veithausen's (played by Koch) way of dealing with the issue.

Eventually, in 2015, Koch began shooting the fifth season of the Showtime series Homeland about bipolar CIA Officer Carrie Mathison (Claire Danes). After leaving the CIA, Carrie now works for German billionaire Otto Düring (Koch), a philanthropist who uses the money his family made through affiliation with the Nazis to help struggling people around the world, including in volatile regions of the Middle East. Düring hires her to be his head of security in Berlin.

In 2016, he collaborated again with director Florian Henckel von Donnersmarck for the feature film Never Look Away, produced by Wiedemann & Berg and Walt Disney. The subject of the drama is the life of an artist, loosely based on the biography of Gerhard Richter. Koch stars alongside Tom Schilling, Paula Beer, Saskia Rosendahl, Oliver Masucci and Ina Weisse. Never Look Away was submitted as the German entry for the 2019 Academy Awards and was ultimately nominated by the Academy of Motion Picture Arts and Sciences in the categories of "Best Foreign Language Film" and "Best Cinematography". Koch also won the Bambi award for "Best Actor National" in Never Look Away in 2018.

In 2020, Koch starred in the German-Canadian television series The Defeated by Måns Mårlind. In the thriller series Your Honor (German title Euer Ehren), a German-Austrian adaptation of the Israeli series Kvodo, which aired in April 2022, Koch embodies a incorruptible judge who violates his moral principles and breaks with law and order driven by the infinite love for his son and the concern for his son's life.

In 2023 he appeared in the role of Claus von Amsberg, the prince consort of Queen Beatrix, for the Dutch series Máxima Máxima (TV series).

Koch is a member of the Academy of Motion Picture Arts and Sciences, which awards the Oscar.

In addition to his acting work, he also does symphonic-scenic readings, including Paradise with violinist Daniel Hope, Dream Story with the Hubert Nuss Jazz Quartet and The Kreutzer Sonata after Leo Tolstoy, which Koch dramaturgically adapted and conceived as a stage play with piano and violin.

In May 2026, Koch was cast in an undisclosed role in The Batman: Part II, scheduled for release in 2028.

=== Audiobooks ===
Koch has frequently served as an interpreter of literary and musical-literary audiobooks and live performances of them. Projects have included Schumann – Scenes of a marriage (with Martina Gedeck) about the exchange of letters between Clara and Robert Schumann, and accompanied by Argentinean bandoneon virtuoso Roberto Russo Koch has also presented excerpts from The Player by Dostoyevsky. The premiere of a play reading of Rhapsody: A Dream Novel by Arthur Schnitzler – accompanied by compositions especially for jazz – took place at the Literature and Poetry Festival in Bad Homburg in 2011.

In 2012, he produced the audiobook Koch is reading Heuss about speeches and letters by Theodor Heuss, in collaboration with Cherbuliez Productions.

Koch twice lent his voice to the audiobook edition of Brigitte – Strong Voices. In 2007, he recorded the novel A perfect friend (by Martin Suter), followed by the crime story On the twelfth day (Wolfgang Schorlau) in 2014.

== Personal life ==
Koch lives in Berlin and has two children (Paulina Keller and Jacob Koch). He was in a relationship with actress Carice van Houten, whom he met on the set of the film Black Book, from 2005 to 2009.

== Filmography (selection) ==
- Transit (1991) – Gerhardt
- Death Came As a Friend (1991, TV film) – young Gerhard Selb
- The Duck Bros./Dog Days (1991–2011, franchise) – Stanley (voice)
- Cosimas Lexikon (1992) – Sven
- Der Mann mit der Maske (1994, TV film) – Bernd Schild
- Blutige Spur (1995, TV film) – Daniel
- Hart to Hart: Two Harts in 3/4 Time (1995, TV film) – Hans Ditsch
- Les Alsaciens ou les Deux Mathilde (1996, TV miniseries) – Wismar
- Death Game (1997, TV film) – Andreas Baader
- Gloomy Sunday (1999) – Obersturmbannführer Eichbaum
- Valley of the Shadows (1999) – von Sviet
- The Tunnel (2001) – Matthis Hiller
- Dance with the Devil (2001, TV film) – Richard Oetker
- Die Manns – Ein Jahrhundertroman (2001, TV miniseries) – Klaus Mann
- Amen. (2002) – Rudolf Höss
- Napoleon (2002, TV miniseries) – Maréchal Jean Lannes
- The Flying Classroom (2003) – Robert 'Nichtraucher' Uthofft
- Two Days of Hope (2003, TV film) – Helmut Kaminski
- Princesse Marie (2004, TV film) – Rodolphe Löwenstein
- Stauffenberg, a.k.a. Operation Valkyrie (2004, TV film) – Claus von Stauffenberg
- Deadly Diversion (2004) – Philipp
- Speer und Er (2005, TV film) – Albert Speer
- The Shell Seekers (2006, TV film) – Cosmo
- The Lives of Others (2006) – Georg Dreyman
- Black Book (2006) – Ludwig Müntze
- Rudy: The Return of the Racing Pig (2007) – Thomas Bussmann
- At Any Second (2008) – Dr. Hans Frick
- Effi Briest (2009) – Geert von Instetten
- Sea Wolf (2009, TV film) – Wolf Larsen
- Manipulation (2011) – Harry Wind
- Unknown (2011) – Professor Bressler
- Camelot (2011, TV miniseries) – King Uther
- Albatross (2011) – Jonathan
- The Weekend (2012) – Jens Kessler
- God Loves Caviar (2012) – Varvakis
- In the Shadow, a.k.a. Ve stínu (Czech title) (2012) – Zenke
- Suspension of Disbelief (2012) – Martin
- A Good Day to Die Hard (2013) – Yuri Komarov
- October November (2013) – Andreas
- The Galapagos Affair: Satan Came to Eden (2013) – Heinz Wittmer (voice)
- Homeland (2015–2016, TV series) – Otto Düring
- Madame Nobel (2014, TV film) – Alfred Nobel
- The Danish Girl (2015) – Warnekros
- Bridge of Spies (2015) – Wolfgang Vogel
- Kalinka (2016) – Dieter Krombach
- Fog in August (2016) – Dr. Werner Veithausen
- Billionaire Ransom (2016) – Bobby Hartmann
- Bel Canto (2018)
- Never Look Away (2018)
- 11-11: Memories Retold (2018, Video game) – Kurt (voice)
- The Name of the Rose (2019, TV miniseries)
- The Defeated (2021 Netflix series)
- Your Honor (2022, TV series)
- Máxima (2024, TV Series) – Prince Claus of the Netherlands
- ETTY (2025, TV series)
- The Batman: Part II (Upcoming) (2028, Movie)

== Awards and nominations (selection) ==
- 2001 – German Television Awards nomination for best supporting actor in Der Tunnel
- 2002
  - Adolf Grimme Award for his portrayal of Richard Oetker in Dance with the Devil – The Kidnapping of Richard Oetker
  - Bavarian TV Award ("Blue Panther") for his portrayal of Klaus Mann in The Manns – A Novel of the Century
  - Adolf Grimme Award for his portrayal of Klaus Mann in The Manns – A Novel of the Century
  - Jupiter Award for his portrayal of Richard Oetker in Dance with the Devil – The Kidnapping of Richard Oetker
- 2003 – DIVA Award; nominated for "Best German Actor" at the Verleihung der Goldenen Kamera for his role in Napoleon.
- 2004 – Golden Gong award for Stauffenberg; German Television Awards nomination for "Best Leading Actor" in Stauffenberg.
- 2005 – Bavarian TV Award ("Blue Panther") for his portrayal of Albert Speer in Speer und Er; German Television Award for "Best Leading Role" in Speer und Er.
- 2006 – Quadriga award for The Lives of Others (shared with Ulrich Mühe and the film's director, Florian Henckel von Donnersmarck); Bambi award for best actor (national).
- 2007 – Globo d'Oro award for "Best European Actor" (Italy)
- 2010 – Nomination for "Best Male Actor" for the International Emmy Award; Nomination as "Most Popular Actor" for the Austrian Romy TV award for his performance in Sea Wolf
- 2013 – Nomination for "Best Supporting Actor" for the Czech Lion for The Shadow of the Horse (Ve Stinu)
- 2015 – Nomination for "Most Popular Actor" for the Austrian Romy TV award for his performance in Madame Nobel
- 2016 – Günter Rohrbach TV Award for his role in Fog in August; Nomination for the Screen Actors Guild Award in the category "Best Acting Ensemble in a Drama Series" for Homeland
- 2018 – Bambi award for "Best Actor National"
- 2019 – Nomination for "Best Actor" for the Austrian Romy TV award for his performance in Never Look Away
- 2021 – "Die Europa" award at the Braunschweig International Film Festival
