= Kurt Warnekros =

German gynaecologist (1882–1949)

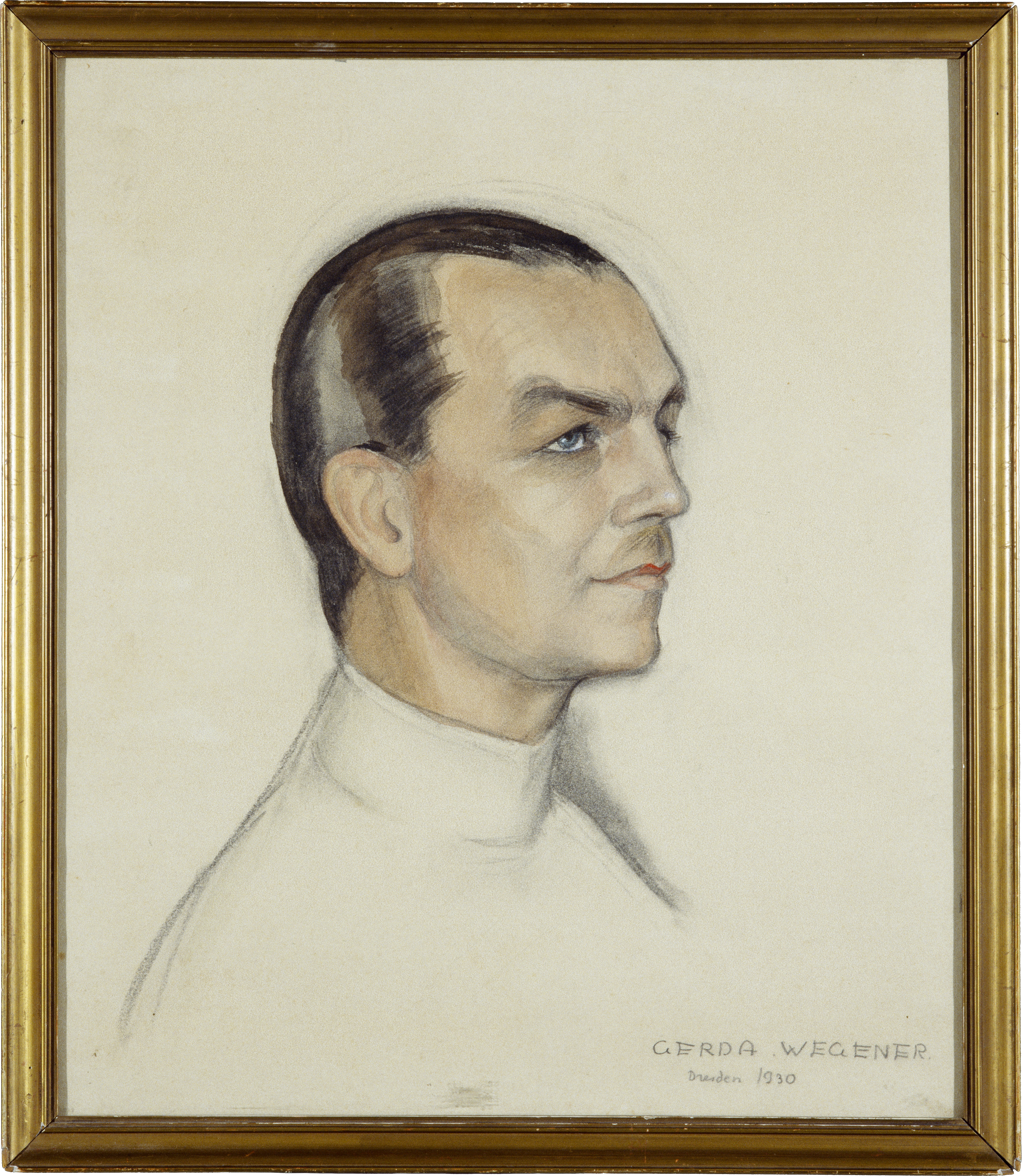
1930 portrait of Warnekros by Gerda Wegener

Kurt Warnekros (November 15, 1882–September 30, 1949) was a German gynaecologist and pioneer in sex reassignment surgery.

== Biography ==
Kurt Warnekros was born on November 15, 1882, in the family of the professor of medicine Ludwig Warnekros at the University of Berlin. Warnekros himself studied medicine in Würzburg and Berlin from 1902 to 1907. He received his medical license in 1908 and worked at the Women's Hospital of the University of Berlin from 1909. In 1918 Warnekros was appointed professor and in 1924 as head of the hospital. In addition to working as a gynecologist, Warnekros also worked scientifically in the field of X-rays, making x-rays of babies in the womb.

== Lili Elbe ==
In 1930, following a trip to Paris, Warnekros took Lili Elbe (née Wegener) as a patient. As a result, Warnekros arranged a series of operations serving as Elbe's feminizing genitoplasty. This was following the operation performed at Magnus Hirschfeld's Institute for Sexual Research for the removal of Elbe's testicles. A series of three operations was performed. Lili died after the last (as well as most ambitious) operation ventured, when her body rejected the transplanted womb.

== Portrayals in popular culture ==
In the 1933 semi-biographical narrative of Elbe's life, Man into Woman, Warnekros is depicted through the character Werner Kreutz.

Kurt Warnekros is portrayed by Sebastian Koch in the 2015 film The Danish Girl.
