= The Division =

2001 police procedural television series

- Genre: Drama; Police procedural
- Created by: Deborah Joy LeVine
- Starring: Bonnie Bedelia; Lela Rochon Fuqua; David Gianopoulos; Nancy McKeon; Tracey Needham; Lisa Vidal; Jon Hamm; Taraji P. Henson; Amy Jo Johnson
- Theme music composer: Jay Gruska; Starr Parodi & Jeff Eden Fair
- Country of origin: United States
- Original language: English
- No. of seasons: 4
- No. of episodes: 88

Production
- Executive producer: Deborah Joy LeVine
- Producers: Barry Schkolnick; Sascha Schneider; Richard Davis
- Running time: 44 minutes
- Production companies: Kedzie Productions; Viacom Productions

Original release
- Network: Lifetime
- Release: January 7, 2001 – June 28, 2004

The Division is an American police procedural drama television series created by Deborah Joy LeVine starring Bonnie Bedelia. The series focuses on a team of female detectives and police officers in the San Francisco Police Department. The series premiered on Lifetime on January 7, 2001, and ended on June 28, 2004, after 88 episodes.

== Overview ==
The show focused on the lives of five policewomen in the felony division headed by Captain Kate McCafferty (Bonnie Bedelia). Storylines revolved around the women's personal and professional lives, and their attempts to balance both. The series tackled such topics as alcoholism, drug addiction, homophobia, and sexual abuse.

The series premiered on January 7, 2001, earning a 3.1 rating and the "largest audience of any basic cable original series" that year. After four seasons, the show was canceled on June 28, 2004. It was the network's second "longest-running scripted series".

After its cancellation, The Division was rebroadcast on the Lifetime network in various timeslots until 2007. In 2007, reruns aired on Lifetime Real Women. Starting in September 2018, the broadcast syndication became available on Start TV.

== Cast and characters ==
=== Main ===
Actor	Character	Seasons			
Actor	Character	1	2	3	4
Bonnie Bedelia	Captain Kaitlyn "Kate" McCafferty	Main	Main	Main	Main
Lela Rochon	Inspector Angela Reid	Main			
David Gianopoulos	Inspector Peter Torianno	Main			
Nancy McKeon	Inspector Jinny Exstead	Main	Main	Main	Main
Tracey Needham	Inspector Candace "C.D." DeLorenzo	Main	Main	Main	
Lisa Vidal	Inspector Magdalena "Magda" Ramirez	Main	Main	Main	Main
Jon Hamm	Inspector Nate Basso		Main	Main	Main
Taraji P. Henson	Officer/Inspector Raina Washington		Main	Main	Main
Amy Jo Johnson	Officer Stacy Reynolds				Main

- Captain Kaitlyn "Kate" McCafferty is the commanding officer of SFPD's Felony Division and mother to a teenage daughter.
- Inspector Jinny Exstead comes from a police family and often bends the rules, which puts her at odds with Captain McCafferty.
- Inspector Candace "C. D." DeLorenzo has some past demons. She resigns in-between seasons 3 and 4 after being shot in the line of duty.
- Inspector Magdalena "Magda" Ramirez is a single mother of a young son. She is close friends with her partner Jinny Exstead.
- Inspector Angela Reid is a sassy no-nonsense investigator. She leaves the Division at the end of the first season.
- Inspector Peter Torianno is Magda's partner. He leaves the Division halfway through of the first season.
- Inspector Nate Basso is DeLorenzo's second partner, arriving at the Division in the second season. Following her departure at the end of the third season, Basso is then partnered with Raina Washington.
- Officer/Inspector Raina Washington is a new member of the Division, arriving in the second season after Reid's transfer. In the third season, she is promoted to Inspector, and is later partnered with Basso in the final season.
- Officer Stacy Reynolds, a new officer hired in the final season by McCafferty to be her police services aid.

=== Recurring ===
- Jose Yenque as Gabriel 'Gabe' Herrera (2001–04)
- Jacob Urrutia as Benjamin Ramirez (2001–04)
- Alex Rocco as John Exstead Sr. (2001–04)
- Allen Cutler as Casey Exstead (2001–04)
- Scott Plank as John Exstead Jr. (2001–02)
- Tanya Vidal as Lily Ramirez (2001–03)
- Jay Harrington as Theodore Blumenthal (2001–02)
- Michael MacRae as Steven (2001)
- D. B. Woodside as Daniel Reide (2001)
- Morgan Brayton as Amanda McCafferty (2001)
- James Avery as Charles Haysbert (2002–03)
- Troy Evans as Dusty (2002–03)
- Robin Thomas as Louis Perillo (2002–04)
- Lauren Tom as Nora Chen (2002)
- Dean Cain as Insp. Jack Ellis (2003–2004)
- Linda Gehringer as Dolores (2003–04)
- David Sutcliffe as Dr. Michaelson/Jonah (2003)
- Jon Tenney as Hank Riley (2004)

=== Guest ===
- Peter Coyote as Ross (2002)
- Sara Rue as Amanda McCafferty (2002–03)
- Paige Hurd as Chloe Newland (2003)
- Daniel Morton as Detective Lawson (2003) (uncredited)
- Roma Downey as Reagan Gilancy (2004)
- Kim Fields as Principal Ogden (2004)
- Rebecca Gayheart as Suzanne Richland (2004)
- Nia Peeples as Sandra Prestiss (2004)
- Zachary Levi as Todd (2004)

== Episodes ==
=== Series overview ===
Season	Episodes	Originally released	
Season	Episodes	First released	Last released
1	22	January 7, 2001	July 29, 2001
2	22	January 6, 2002	August 11, 2002
3	22	January 5, 2003	August 3, 2003
4	22	January 11, 2004	June 28, 2004

=== Season 1 (2001) ===
No. overall	No. in season	Title	Directed by	Written by	Original release date
1	1	"The Pilot"	Robert Butler	Deborah Joy LeVine	January 7, 2001
Inspectors Magda Ramirez and Peter Torianno uncover a slave-labor ring abusing Asian immigrants. Captain Kate McCafferty is dismayed when Inspector Jinny Exstead botches a bust of deadbeat dads, and is further ruffled by news that her 18-year-old daughter, Amanda, plans to marry her slacker boyfriend. Inspectors Candace DeLorenzo and Angela Reid, partnered up for the first time, must overcome their differences to solve the homicide of a famous psychiatrist.
2	2	"There but for Fortune"	James Frawley	Deborah Joy LeVine	January 7, 2001
Magda and Peter bust a meth lab, only to find that Magda's sister works there. Jinny goes undercover to bring down the owner of a strip club who forces dancers to have sex with celebrity customers. Candace and Angela investigate the death of an unidentified homeless man. Kate is having a relationship with a younger man, the assistant district attorney.
3	3	"Seduced and Abandoned"	Leslie Libman	Deborah Joy LeVine, Dan Levine	January 14, 2001
Candace and Angela crack the case of a murdered young woman by using her still-active cell phone. Jinny and Magda work a case of dog abuse. Kate and her daughter, Amanda, spar over wedding plans. The detectives have a candid discussion about men.
4	4	"Forces of Deviance"	Jerry London	Deborah Joy LeVine, Barry Schkolnick	January 21, 2001
Kate and the squad investigate the shooting death of an unarmed man at the hands of two fellow officers, bringing into focus cop culture and the 'Blue Wall of Silence'. Jinny's drinking habit interferes with her ability to watch over a nervous witness. Candace suspects her picture-perfect husband of cheating on her when she finds another woman's number in his wallet.
5	5	"Mother's Day"	Jesus Trevino	Deborah Joy LeVine, Dan Levine	January 28, 2001
The desperate search for a stolen infant mobilizes the entire squad — and raises issues about motherhood for all the detectives. It's a race against time: with each passing second, the chances of finding the abducted baby dwindle.
6	6	"Secrets and Lies"	Artie Mandelberg	Siobhan Byrne, Deborah Joy LeVine	February 11, 2001
Candace and Angela look into the death of an ambitious young reporter who was investigating a union corruption story. Jinny and Magda look after a "mule," a young Colombian who ingested cocaine in return for a free ride to the U.S. At home, Magda must deal with her little boy's frustration over not having a father. Kate's daughter, Amanda, comes to her mother for some very personal advice about her upcoming nuptials.
7	7	"The Fear Factor"	Martha Mitchell	Joy Kecken, Deborah Joy LeVine,	February 18, 2001
Candace and Jinny investigate a rape case. Was the victim "asking for it" because she posted nude photos of herself on the Internet? Magda and Peter travel to Minnesota to extradite a murderer. Angela spars with her husband over the issue of having children; she is hesitant because she fears that she will suffer from breast cancer, like many of the women in her family.
8	8	"Don't Ask"	Patrick Norris	Deborah Joy LeVine	February 25, 2001
Magda and Jinny's investigation into the death of a college student exposes the rampant homophobia in the victim's fraternity. The case touches a nerve with Jinny, whose own brother's coming-out unleashes a fury of prejudice in her family. Candace and Angela look into a case of alleged elder abuse. Angela learns of Candace's marital woes. Kate and her younger boyfriend, Braedon, fight about the state of their relationship.
9	9	"What Sharp Teeth You Have"	Sarah Pia Anderson	Deborah Joy LeVine, Dan Levine	March 4, 2001
Magda and Peter moonlight at a gun show and discover that one of the dealers is selling illegal weapons. The pair's already charged relationship gets more intense. Candace and Angela deal with a fellow cop on the verge of a mental breakdown. Jinny begins dating a straitlaced assistant DA.
10	10	"Hero"	Andy Wolk	Deborah Joy LeVine, Barry Schkolnick	March 11, 2001
Candace and Angela investigate suspicious illnesses and deaths at a local hospital. Jinny and Magda search for a troubled teen who set a fire at his high school. Magda and Peter assess whether their professional partnership can survive, given their personal feelings for each other.
11	11	"Absolution"	Martha Mitchell	Story by : Barry Schkolnick	March 18, 2001
Kate reopens her first-ever homicide case when it is revealed that the wrong man may have been convicted. How will she handle the ramifications of past decisions? Jinny and Magda investigate the baffling murder of an Asian man. Candace's problems with her husband's infidelities come to a head.
12	12	"Faces in the Crowd"	Andy Wolk	Deborah Joy LeVine, Dan Levine	April 1, 2001
Jinny is the target of a seemingly random shooting. The efforts of her brothers and boyfriend to make her feel safe do little to alleviate her feelings of vulnerability. Candace and Angela investigate the murder of a pizza deliveryman. Magda struggles to resolve her conflicts with Peter.
13	13	"Partners in Crime"	Artie Mandelberg	Deborah Joy LeVine, Dan Levine	April 8, 2001
Kate deals with heated community conflict surrounding an upcoming murder trial, as the entire squad pitches in to interview reluctant witnesses. The gun used to kill Candace's former partner is discovered, dredging up painful memories. Jinny's boyfriend wants to take their relationship to a new level. Magda voices concerns about Jinny's drinking. Angela gives her husband a big surprise.
14	14	"The Parent Trap"	Aaron Lipstadt	Kimberly Costello, Deborah Joy LeVine	April 15, 2001
Magda and Jinny attempt to help a troubled teen take responsibility for her actions. During a stakeout, Angela and Candace evaluate their partnership. Kate ruffles the feathers of her future son-in-law when she takes charge during her daughter's medical crisis.
15	15	"Deal With the Devil"	Jeffrey Reiner	Deborah Joy LeVine, Barry Schkolnick	April 22, 2001
Magda's rejection of a judge's sexual overtures endangers the outcome of a trial in which she is a key witness. Much to Candace's consternation, her deceased partner's informant, the only suspect in his death, is brought into custody. Kate and her sister must deal with their mother's deteriorating health together — and face their own troubled relationship.
16	16	"Obsessions"	Alan Myerson	Deborah Joy LeVine, Dan Levine	April 29, 2001
Magda and Jinny investigate the death of a compulsive gambler. Candace reveals the truth about her partner's death to Angela, putting their personal and professional relationship to the test. Sparks fly and old wounds reopen when Magda bumps into Ben's estranged father, Gabriel.
17	17	"The First Hit's Free, Baby"	Jeffrey Reiner	Deborah Joy LeVine	June 10, 2001
Magda goes undercover as a prison inmate during a murder investigation. Candace and Angela get more than they bargain for when they take a documentary filmmaker on a ride-along to serve a subpoena. When Jinny meets Theodore's family and ex-girlfriend, her drinking problem resurfaces and threatens to destroy the romantic relationship.
18	18	"Mothers & Daughters"	Richard Compton	Deborah Joy LeVine, William Macchi	June 17, 2001
Magda and Jinny investigate a murder committed by a Latina gang member whose parents have strived to keep her out of the gang environment. Angela is investigated for police brutality when she accidentally kills a violent man while subduing him in choke hold.
19	19	"Redemption"	Jeffrey Reiner	Deborah Joy LeVine, Barry Schkolnick	June 24, 2001
Candace and Inspector Al Deluca investigate an attempted murder and discover that the victim is a former teen criminal who achieved celebrity because of her crimes, and the perpetrator is one of her adoring fans. Jinny sabotages her relationship with Teddy by sleeping with another man.
20	20	"High on the Hog"	Patrick Norris	Deborah Joy LeVine, Larry Moskowitz	July 1, 2001
When Jinny is late for work, Magda must go on a drug bust of a biker gang by herself. Magda is attacked by one of the bikers and held at gunpoint with her own gun. Candace and Angela investigate what looks to be an accidental death, and in the process uncover an elaborate plan to kill a diamond broker.
21	21	"Virgin Territory"	Alan Myerson	Deborah Joy LeVine, Dan Levine	July 22, 2001
Kate, Candace, Angela and Deluca help the FBI investigate a serial killer in the San Francisco area. When they discover that the killer is a homeless woman who is killing other homeless women, Angela disguises herself to trap the killer. Magda is called to the police station to pick up Jinny after she goes on a drunken bender, and Candace and her husband decide to separate.
22	22	"Intervention"	Aaron Lipstadt	Deborah Joy LeVine	July 29, 2001
Kate suspends Jinny after she shows up to make an arrest drunk and disheveled. Magda secretly organizes an intervention in the hopes that Jinny will confront her addiction and go to rehab, but Jinny refuses to go to rehab.

=== Season 2 (2002) ===
No. overall	No. in season	Title	Directed by	Written by	Original release date
23	1	"Spin Dry"	Aaron Lipstadt	Deborah Joy LeVine	January 6, 2002
Jinny returns from rehab and faces off with Kate, demanding her gun, ID and badge back. Candace and her new partner, Inspector Nate Basso, investigate someone in the San Francisco area who has been assaulting pregnant prostitutes. Jinny and Magda solve a murder case involving a little girl whose parents are linked to a drug deal that went awry.
24	2	"Shelby"	Andy Wolk	Deborah Joy LeVine, Christian Williams	January 13, 2002
Kate works with Jinny and Magda as they investigate a powerful litigator who is suspected of killing a missing intern. However, the intern eventually reveals herself, alive and well, having planned the entire charade in order to bring down the womanizing politician. Nate and Candace find out that thousands of dollars were stolen by a man who took the money to pay for his disabled son's medical bills.
25	3	"This Thing Called Love"	Jeffrey Reiner	Deborah Joy LeVine, Barry Schkolnick	January 20, 2002
Jinny and Magda investigate a brutal murder. Nate and Candace investigate a hit-and-run death.
26	4	"Forgive Me, Father"	Bobby Roth	Judith Feldman, Deborah Joy LeVine, Sarah Woodside Gallagher	January 27, 2002
An arsonist kills two people and Kate is on the case. Candace and Nate discover a dead body in a church. Jinny sees her ex-boyfriend Teddy for the first time since rehab.
27	5	"Insult to the Body"	Jeffrey Reiner	Deborah Joy LeVine, William Macchi	February 10, 2002
Candace and Nate struggle to crack a seemingly unsolvable murder case. Officer Raina Washington steps out-of-bounds and elicits a confession from a suspect who has not been read his rights.
28	6	"Journey"	Betty Kaplan	Deborah Joy LeVine, Barry Schkolnick	February 17, 2002
Magda tries to help an elderly woman admit that she's a victim of spousal abuse. Raina sheds her rookie status as she takes on a tough murder case.
29	7	"A Priori"	Rachel Talalay	Catherine LePard, Deborah Joy LeVine	February 24, 2002
Jinny makes a split-second decision that could cost her her job. Magda's world is turned upside down when her son, Ben, goes missing. Candace and Nate investigate the death of a high school bully.
30	8	"Hide and Seek"	Marita Grabiak	Deborah Joy LeVine, Barry Schkolnick	March 10, 2002
Jinny and Magda try to solve the murder of a suburban mother who was killed by another mother. Candace and Nate investigate the murder of an evil stalker. Kate's daughter returns for a visit.
31	9	"Beyond the Grave"	Jeffrey Reiner	Deborah Joy LeVine	March 17, 2002
Candace and Nate enlist a psychic to help find a missing girl. Magda's sister, Lily, is out of jail and causing problems. Jinny's Alcoholics Anonymous sponsor tells her to seek Magda's forgiveness. Kate struggles with her mother's death.
32	10	"Angel Work"	Aaron Lipstadt	Deborah Joy LeVine, John Mankiewicz	March 31, 2002
Jinny and Magda investigate the murder of a former rock star and member of Alcoholics Anonymous. Jinny must face her own personal feelings about the solidarity and trust of what is revealed during AA meetings.
33	11	"Keep Hope Alive"	Andy Wolk	Judith Feldman, Deborah Joy LeVine, Sarah Woodside Gallagher	April 7, 2002
Candace and Nate investigate a kidnapping. Raina helps convince a young boy who witnessed a gang murder to testify. Jinny is uncomfortable with helping Magda plan her wedding.
34	12	"Illusions"	Bobby Roth	Deborah Joy LeVine, William Macchi	April 21, 2002
Jinny and Magda investigate after a drug addict is the victim of an armed assault. Kate has reservations about a killer-turned-artist who is up for parole. Nate worries about his mentally disabled sister after she announces her engagement.
35	13	"Remembrance"	Andy Wolk	Deborah Joy LeVine, Barry Schkolnick	April 28, 2002
Nate and Candace try to help a 12-year-old girl after heroin is found in her schoolbag. Jinny and Magda must convince a rape victim to recover blocked memories so they can solve an investigation. Kate's upcoming 50th birthday causes her to reflect on her former marriage.
36	14	"Unfamiliar Territory"	Ellie Kanner	Deborah Joy LeVine, Gwendolyn M. Parker	May 12, 2002
Jinny and Magda investigate the murder of a woman and the possible involvement of her sexist co-workers. Raina tries to solve a stalking case involving a girl with whom she went to high school. Candace attempts to date again.
37	15	"Welcome Home"	Bobby Roth	Deborah Joy LeVine, Frank South	May 19, 2002
When a female Marine is found dead, Nate and Candace must conduct their investigation alongside a JAG lieutenant. Jinny and Magda investigate the death of a teenager who overdosed at a rave. Raina takes her relationship with Dom to the next step.
38	16	"Brave New World"	Janice Cooke-Leonard	Deborah Joy LeVine, Barry Schkolnick	June 2, 2002
Candace and Nate investigate the possible involvement of a judge in a young woman's murder. Jinny and Magda go undercover to bust a woman who's performing unauthorized cosmetic surgeries. Kate finds the experience of a dating service harrowing.
39	17	"Secrets, Lies & Weddings"	Martha Mitchell	Judith Fieldman, Sarah Woodside Gallagher	June 9, 2002
It's Magda's wedding day, but there's one thing missing...the bride. Nate and Candace investigate the murder of a renowned advice columnist. Kate's personal life gets complicated when a rivalry between her new beau and her ex-husband develops.
40	18	"Farewell, My Lovelies"	Patrick Norris	John Mankiewicz	June 23, 2002
Jinny must reevaluate her commitment to Alcoholics Anonymous when her sponsor begins drinking again. Nate and Candace investigate the death of a private eye's assistant. When Ben's flu doesn't respond to regular medication, Magda fears it may be something else.
41	19	"Full Moon"	Nancy McKeon	Barry Schkolnick	July 21, 2002
A full moon puts the entire division on alert for a possible strike by a serial killer. Candace and Nate investigate a murder caught on a reality TV show. Jinny and Teddy must work a case together.
42	20	"Long Day's Journey"	Martha Mitchell	Story by : William Macchi	July 28, 2002
Kate must negotiate a very tense hostage crisis after a bus is hijacked. The pressure escalates when Raina, one of the passengers on the bus, tries to help. Magda and Gabe must face tough decisions regarding Ben's leukemia.
43	21	"Before the Deluge"	Patrick Norris	Deborah Joy LeVine	August 4, 2002
The division is on full alert when a racist murderer commits a spree of hate crimes. While the manhunt continues, Jinny discovers a shocking secret. Magda tries to stay strong for Ben.
44	22	"Sweet Sorrow"	Aaron Lipstadt	Deborah Joy LeVine	August 11, 2002
While the division fights to catch a racist murderer, Jinny must grapple with her family's secret revelation. Magda continues to deal with Ben's medical condition, while Raina attempts to advance her career.

=== Season 3 (2003) ===
No. overall	No. in season	Title	Directed by	Written by	Original release date
45	1	"Til Death Do Us Part"	Aaron Lipstadt	Deborah Joy LeVine	January 5, 2003
A startling shooting and an impromptu wedding. Candace will return from her holiday sans boyfriend; the recently promoted "Inspector" Raina struggles to track down a missing child; and Magda rushes against the clock to help her son.
46	2	"Oh Mother Who Art Thou?"	Andy Wolk	John Mankiewicz	January 12, 2003
Candace is forced to face some painful memories when her mom shows up unexpectedly. Jinny and Raina pair up to investigate the overdose of a wealthy drug addict, and Magda and Gabe try to keep their marriage strong while caring for their sick son.
47	3	"Bewitched, Bothered and Bewildered"	Aaron Lipstadt	Barry Schkolnick	January 19, 2003
An exciting career opportunity emerges for Kate. Jinny, Magda, Candace and Nate join forces to solve a tricky murder case involving a woman who was about to testify in her own rape trial.
48	4	"Murder.com"	Martha Mitchell	Dan Levine	February 2, 2003
Inspectors go digging into the murder of a college student whose life was secretly being broadcast over the Internet. Magda's sister finds a little 'tender loving care' in a very unexpected place and Jinny goes into an emotional tailspin on the anniversary of her mom's suicide.
49	5	"Testimonial"	Charles Haid	Deborah Joy LeVine	February 16, 2003
Cops come together to capture a serial rapist who is targeting disabled women. Nate shares a shocking secret with Candace.
50	6	"Cold Comfort"	Bobby Roth	Robert Ward	February 23, 2003
Nate and Candace pitch in to help Nate's ex-partner, while Raina investigates a hit-and-run involving a seven-year-old girl and discovers the hard way that nothing is as it seems.
51	7	"Strangers"	Janice Cooke-Leonard	Sarah Woodside Gallagher & Judith Feldman	March 9, 2003
Jinny struggles with her love life, while Magda and Gabe find themselves knee-deep in debt. A stalking case may be connected to a separate homicide investigation. It's up to Nate and Candace to solve the puzzle.
52	8	"Cost of Freedom"	Nancy McKeon	Jasmine Love	March 16, 2003
Kate must navigate her way through a political minefield when a friend speaks out in support of legalizing medical marijuana. The captain's team of investigators is wrapped up in the case of an Asian woman found dead in the water under the Bay Bridge.
53	9	"Cradle Will Rock"	Aaron Lipstadt	Deborah Joy LeVine	March 30, 2003
Jinny faces her toughest challenge yet in her fight against alcoholism. Nate and Candace go on the prowl for the parents of a baby abandoned at a restaurant. Magda continues to flounder.
54	10	"Radioactive Spiders"	Patrick Norris	John Mankiewicz	April 6, 2003
The cops are on the case of a murdered lawyer whose clientele consisted of deadbeat dads. A suspect falls for Raina, and Jinny is teetering on the brink. And when Candace invites Nate and his date over for dinner, chaos ensues.
55	11	"Rush to Judgment"	Jeffrey Rainer	Barry Schkolnick	April 13, 2003
Jack confronts Jinny about her newest substance abuse problem. Raina and Magda look into accusations of child abuse. Candace and Nate get the strange assignment of tracking down $25,000 worth of missing truffles from an eatery.
56	12	"Misdirection"	Patrick Norris	Dan Levine	April 20, 2003
When the squad hunts down a hired assassin, one of its own gets caught in the cross fire. Kate considers undergoing a makeover while gearing up to campaign for chief of police.
57	13	"Rich Girl, Poor Girl"	Andy Wolk	Sarah Woodside Gallagher & Judith Feldman	May 4, 2003
The squad must come to the rescue when a wealthy businessman's daughter is kidnapped. Jinny struggles with a new addiction and Magda grapples with keeping her marriage vows.
58	14	"Wish You Were Here"	Aaron Lipstadt	Deborah Joy LeVine	May 11, 2003
Candace and Nate investigate a psychiatrist accused of raping a mentally ill patient. Magda is tempted to have an affair. And as Jinny's drug addiction spirals out of control, she receives devastating family news.
59	15	"Baby, It's Cold Outside"	Andy Wolk	Story by : Tim Davis & John Mankiewicz; Teleplay by : Deborah Joy LeVine	May 18, 2003
Jinny attempts to go cold turkey in order to beat her drug habit. The rest of the cops must crack the case of a murdered woman who worked at an AIDS hospice.
60	16	"Extreme Action Figures"	Joseph Perez	Story by : Philippe Browning; Teleplay by : Dan Levine	June 1, 2003
Inspectors suspect that steroid abuse is responsible for the death of a high school football player. Nate and Lily try to overcome the problems in their relationship, and Jinny turns to a higher power for strength.
61	17	"Castaways"	Rachel Talalay	Story by : Jasmine Love & Dan Levine; Teleplay by : Dan Levine	June 8, 2003
Kate faces a dilemma when a local activist is accused of hiding a murderer in a homeless shelter. Raina's search for her birth mother doesn't go according to plan.
62	18	"Body Double"	Janice Cooke-Leonard	William Macchi	June 15, 2003
Kate's run for chief of police may be hazardous to her health. The squad struggles to crack a case after evidence is stolen from the morgue.
63	19	"Diagnosis"	Roxann Dawson	Story by : Barry Schkolnick; Teleplay by : Barry Schkolnick & Tim Davis & John Mankiewicz	July 6, 2003
Kate begins the long road to recovery after her stroke. Magda encourages Jinny to see a therapist. The inspectors look into the murder of a young woman who was leading a double life online.
64	20	"Thus With a Kiss, I Die"	Jeffrey Rainer	Sarah Woodside Gallagher & Judith Feldman	July 13, 2003
Magda struggles with her cheating heart. Nate gets a gift he never expected at his birthday party.
65	21	"Hearts and Minds"	Aaron Lipstadt	Deborah Joy LeVine	July 27, 2003
Inspectors go on a hunt for three escaped prisoners. Jinny copes with the end of her marriage, and Magda faces a pregnancy scare. Nate and Candace must deal with the aftermath of the steamy kiss they shared. Kate contemplates quitting the force.
66	22	"Acts of Betrayal"	Aaron Lipstadt	Deborah Joy LeVine & Dan Levine	August 3, 2003
The search for three escaped convicts continues. Kate has second thoughts about resigning. Raina bends a few rules so that Jinny can meet her brother's murderer. Magda's affair with Jonah seems to be ending as Candace's romance with Nate heats up.

=== Season 4 (2004) ===
No. overall	No. in season	Title	Directed by	Written by	Original release date
67	1	"Bite Me"	Aaron Lipstadt	Deborah Joy LeVine	January 11, 2004
While Jinny struggles after the split with her husband, she crosses paths with a hunky sketch artist. Kate gets an unexpected present from her daughter and Raina attempts to settle in with her new partner, Nate. The first big case involves a killer pit bull. Kate recruits rookie officer Stacy Reynolds as a new member of the squad.
68	2	"Skips and Stones"	Andy Wolk	Ashley Gable	January 18, 2004
Jinny and Magda race to nab a dangerous cat burglar before he is captured by a determined bounty hunter. Raina takes a swing at romance with a professional baseball player.
69	3	"What's Love Got to Do with It?"	Patrick Norris	Judith Feldman, Sarah Woodside Gallagher	January 25, 2004
Jinny scrambles to save her career when she is investigated by Internal Affairs, while Magda struggles to save her marriage. The rest of the team looks into a homicide that involves a woman with a sex addiction.
70	4	"Play Ball"	Janice Cooke-Leonard	Anne Kenney	February 8, 2004
The top cops investigate a professional baseball player accused of rape. But the case becomes a bit sticky when it turns out that the athlete is best friends with Raina's boyfriend.
71	5	"A Death in The Family"	Leon Ichaso	William Macchi	February 15, 2004
An investigation hits close to home for one of the squad when a mentally disabled man appears to have committed suicide at the assisted-living facility where Nate's sister lives. It's up to Nate and his partner, Raina, to determine whether foul play was involved.
72	6	"That's Them"	Janice Cooke-Leonard	Deborah Joy LeVine, Dan Levine	February 22, 2004
Investigators are under the gun when two gay men are assaulted after an AIDS benefit concert. The pressure heats up even more when the district attorney wants to prosecute this deed as a hate crime, but there are no leads in sight.
73	7	"Rush for the Door"	Joanna Kerns	Deborah Joy LeVine, Anupam Nigam	March 7, 2004
Jinny and Magda investigate a fire that caused a stampede inside a nightclub. Was an arsonist attempting to cover up a murder?
74	8	"Book of Memories"	Martha Mitchell	Deborah Joy LeVin, Dan Levine	March 14, 2004
A child molester is set free by a Supreme Court ruling but then is later murdered. Suddenly, his victims are suspects — and it's up to the investigators to crack the case.
75	9	"It's the Real Thing"	Aaron Lipstadt	Ashley Gable, Deborah Joy LeVine	March 21, 2004
Jinny must tell her new beau some news that will change their lives forever. Nate begins a torrid affair with a married woman. Back at the station, the officers try to stop a wealthy man's drug-trafficking business, but things get complicated when his "perfect" wife gets into the mix.
76	10	"The Fall of the House of Hayes"	Andy Wolk	Judith Fieldman, Sarah Woodside Gallagher, Deborah Joy LeVine	April 4, 2004
The officers must interrogate a family tainted by greed in order to solve a deadly car bombing. Nate's relationship with a married woman takes some unexpected turns. Also, Jinny is grappling with big relationship decisions and Kate struggles with a few family issues of her own.
77	11	"As I Was Going to St. Ives"	Eyal Gordin	Anne Kenney, Deborah Joy LeVine	April 11, 2004
The division must move quickly when a teenage girl is abducted. All clues lead to her stepfather, who may be more of a villain than any of the investigators could have suspected. On the home front, Magda and Gabe try to rekindle their marriage and recover from Magda's adultery.
78	12	"Lost and Found"	Janice Cooke-Leonard	William Macchi, Deborah Joy LeVine	April 25, 2004
A small-time drug dealer and drifter is shot in an upscale San Francisco neighborhood, but the investigation is anything but clear-cut. Nate is pondering a breakup when he realizes that his thrill-seeking girlfriend may be mentally disturbed.
79	13	"The Kids Are Alright"	Babu Subramaniam 'T.R.'	Ashley Gable, Deborah Joy LeVine	May 2, 2004
Investigators go undercover to search for a whistle-blower in order to determine whether the city's most vulnerable children are in jeopardy from the very people who are supposed to help them. When a recovering drug addict kidnaps her child from a foster home, the members of the division fear the worst.
80	14	"Now I Lay Me Down to Sleep"	Roxann Dawson	Judith Fieldman, Sarah Woodside Gallagher, Deborah Joy LeVine	May 9, 2004
The victim of a violent crime awakens from a coma after nine years. The division hopes to find the person who brutalized her. This entire case hinges upon the victim's memory and her ability to identify the assailant before her attacker strikes again.
81	15	"Acts of Desperation"	Patrick Norris	Anne Kenney, Deborah Joy LeVine	May 16, 2004
Stacy uncovers a heartbreaking illegal immigration ring when the sisters of her new friend, a refugee from Chechnya, are held hostage under unthinkable conditions. Stacy will stop at nothing to catch those responsible for this horrendous crime.
82	16	"The Box"	Aaron Lipstadt	Dan Levine	June 6, 2004
Raina is abducted by a killer who targets young women. To make matters worse, someone helping with the case is secretly working with this vicious criminal. Stacy finds herself caught between her past and her future.
83	17	"Crawl Space"	James Quinn	Dan Levine	June 6, 2004
A deranged homicidal maniac demands that a murder suspect be released from custody or else Raina will be his next victim. Raina must use all of her resources to stay alive long enough for her colleagues to rescue her.
84	18	"Baby, the Rain Must Fall"	Jules Lichtman	Deborah Joy LeVine	June 13, 2004
Investigators must figure out what happened to a young assistant D.A. — with a hidden personal life — who fell prey to foul play. Both Raina and Stacy take dangerous turns. Jinny's overprotective mothering is a bit suspect.
85	19	"Hail, Hail, the Gang's All Here"	James A. Contner	Story by : William Macchi & Deborah Joy LeVine; Teleplay by : Deborah Joy LeVine	June 20, 2004
The squad believes they are in the middle of a gang turf war over drugs, but an idealistic young crime reporter helps them get to the truth. Stacy must decide between her ex-fiance or moving on with her life once and for all.
86	20	"Be Careful What You Wish For"	Jeffrey Reiner	Deborah Joy LeVine	June 27, 2004
When a missing pregnant woman turns up murdered, all evidence points to her doting husband. But the squad soon unveils clues leading to a very jealous sister and a few other surprising suspects. On the home front, Kate finds herself unexpectedly dealing with empty-nest syndrome.
87	21	"Zero Tolerance"	Aaron Lipstadt	Deborah Joy LeVine, Dan Levine	June 28, 2004
The squad is on high alert after a school is threatened with total destruction. The top cops are under the gun to rescue the students caught inside. Jinny's upcoming nuptials force her fellow inspectors to reevaluate their commitments to their own significant others.
88	22	"Somewhere in America"	Aaron Lipstadt	Deborah Joy LeVine, Dan Levine	June 28, 2004
Armed invaders threaten to destroy a school with 10 students and one teacher trapped inside. The clock is ticking as the top cops try to figure out who these terrorists are and how to stop the villainous plan. The squad manages to avert the crisis just in time for Jinny and Hank's big wedding day.

== Home media ==
The DVD set containing all four seasons including the pilot was released by Visual Entertainment in Region 1 on March 19, 2018.

As of 2025, this show isn't available to stream on Paramount+ nor Amazon Prime Video, but is distributed by Paramount Global Content Distribution via CBS Media Ventures.

In 2026, the Indian-based international sales agent and representative Flair Communications announced that International rights to the series have been recently acquired under license from the Paramount Skydance corporation to coincide with the show's 25th anniversary, which is set to have remastered the complete series in 4K.

== Awards and nominations ==
Gracie Allen Awards

- Won: Outstanding Entertainment Program Drama (2004, Tied with "Without a Trace")

Imagen Foundation Awards

- Nominated: Best Actress in a Television Drama, Lisa Vidal (2004)

ALMA Awards

- Nominated: Outstanding Actress in a Television Series, Lisa Vidal (2002)

BMI Film & TV Awards

- Won: BMI Cable Award, Jeff Eden Fair (2004)
- Won: BMI Cable Award, Starr Parodi (2004)
- Won: BMI Cable Award, Jeff Eden Fair (2003)
- Won: BMI Cable Award, Starr Parodi (2003)

Young Artist Awards

- Nominated: Best Performance in a TV Drama Series - Guest Starring Young Actress, Joy Lauren (2003)
- Nominated: Best Performance in a TV Drama Series - Guest Starring Young Actor, Shawn Pyfrom (2002)

PRISM Awards

- Won: TV Drama Series Episode (2002, For the episode "Intervention")
- Nominated: Performance in a Drama Series Episode, Nancy McKeon (2003)
- Nominated: Performance in a Drama Series, Nancy McKeon (2003)
- Nominated: Performance in a Drama Series Multi Episode Storyline, Nancy McKeon (2004)

== See also ==
- List of police television dramas
