= 2019 Academy Awards =

2019 Academy Awards may refer to:

- 91st Academy Awards, the Academy Awards ceremony that took place in 2019, honoring the best in film for 2018
- 92nd Academy Awards, the Academy Awards ceremony that took place in 2020, honoring the best in film for 2019
