= Patricia Wettig =

American actress (born 1951)

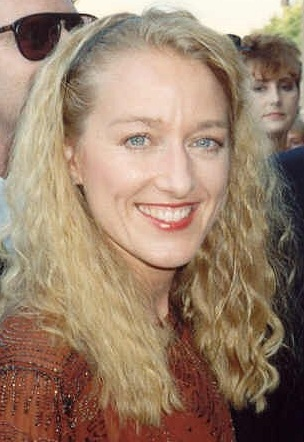
- Wettig at the 41st Primetime Emmy Awards in 1989
- Born: Patricia Anne Wettig; December 4, 1951 (age 74); Milford, Ohio, U.S.
- Education: Temple University
- Occupations: Actress, playwright
- Years active: 1982–present
- Spouse: Ken Olin (m. 1982)
- Children: 2

Patricia Anne Wettig (born December 4, 1951) is an American actress and playwright. She is best known for her role as Nancy Weston in the television series Thirtysomething (1987–1991), for which she received a Golden Globe Award and three Primetime Emmy Awards.

After her breakthrough role in Thirtysomething, Wettig has appeared in a number of films, including Guilty by Suspicion (1991), City Slickers (1991), City Slickers II: The Legend of Curly's Gold (1994), and The Langoliers (1995). She returned to television playing a leading role in the 1995 short-lived drama Courthouse and later played Caroline Reynolds in the Fox drama Prison Break (2005–2007) and Holly Harper in the ABC family drama Brothers & Sisters (2006–2011).

== Early life ==
Wettig was born in Milford, Ohio, to Florence (née Morlock) and Clifford Neal Wettig, a high school basketball coach. She has three sisters: Pam, Phyllis, and Peggy. She was raised in Grove City, Pennsylvania, and graduated in 1970. She attended Ohio Wesleyan University and graduated from Temple University in 1975. She returned to her studies later in life and received a Master of Fine Arts in playwriting from Smith College in 2001. F2M, a play she authored, was performed in 2011 as part of the New York Stage and Film and Vassar College's 2011 Powerhouse Theater season.

== Career ==
Wettig began her career on stage and worked as a personal dresser for Shirley MacLaine. On television, she appeared in episodes of 1980s dramas Remington Steele, Hill Street Blues and L.A. Law, before taking a recurring role as Joanne McFadden in the NBC medical drama series St. Elsewhere from 1986 to 1987. Later in 1987, Wettig was cast as Nancy Weston in the ABC drama series thirtysomething.

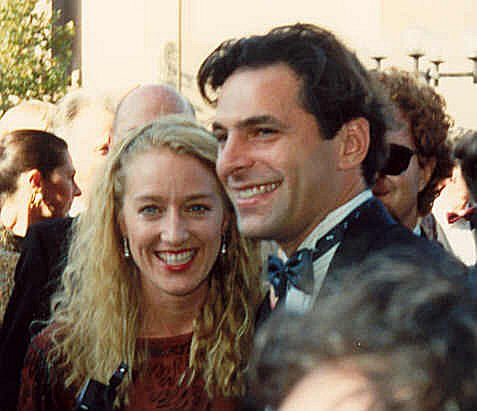
Patricia Wettig and Ken Olin on the red carpet at the 41st Annual Emmy Awards

For her role in Thirtysomething, Wettig received critical acclaim. Her portrayal of Nancy's cancer struggle attracted considerable acclaim and attention. She won three Primetime Emmy Awards: for Outstanding Supporting Actress in a Drama Series in 1988, and for Outstanding Lead Actress in a Drama Series in 1990 and 1991. In 1991, she won the Golden Globe Award for Best Actress – Television Series Drama. The series ended in 1991 after four seasons. Later that year, she made her big screen debut in the drama film Guilty by Suspicion starring opposite Robert De Niro and Annette Bening. She played Billy Crystal's wife in the comedy films City Slickers (1991) and City Slickers II: The Legend of Curly's Gold (1994). In 1993, she had a leading role in the comedy-drama film Me and Veronica .

Wettig has starred in a number of made-for-television movies, include Taking Back My Life: The Nancy Ziegenmeyer Story (1992) and Parallel Lives (1994). She played the role of Laurel Stevenson in the 1995 Stephen King's miniseries The Langoliers. Later in 1995, she returned to television with a leading role of tough female judge in the CBS drama series Courthouse. Wettig intended to leave the show due to "creative differences", with sources saying that she wanted the show to be more of a star vehicle for her, rather than an ensemble cast, but the show was cancelled before her character could be written out.

In 2002, Wettig was a regular cast member in the short-lived Bravo drama series Breaking News. From 2002 to 2004, she played the recurring role of CIA psychotherapist Dr. Judy Barnett on Alias (on which her husband was an executive producer and director). From 2005 to 2007, Wettig appeared in 18 episodes of Fox television drama, Prison Break, playing fictional Vice President Caroline Reynolds. She turned down Fox's offer of becoming a series regular on Prison Break in order to pursue the ABC comedy-drama series Brothers & Sisters, which debuted in September 2006. Wettig starred in the series as the Walker family patriarch's mistress, Holly Harper. She left the show midway through the show's fifth and final season after her character Holly followed fiancé David (played by Wettig's husband Ken Olin and daughter Rebecca to New York.

In 2012, Wettig joined the national tour for Larry Kramer's production, The Normal Heart. In 2014, she starred in the unsold the CW drama pilot Identity opposite Ahna O'Reilly In 2019, she played a leading role in the episode of Netflix anthology series Heartstrings. In 2020, ABC ordered a sequel for Thirtysomething and Wettig was set to return alongside Olin, Timothy Busfield and Mel Harris.

== Personal life ==
Wettig is married to actor and producer Ken Olin; they have a son Clifford (born 1983) and a daughter Roxy (born 1985).

== Filmography ==
=== Film ===
Year	Title	Role	Notes
1991	Guilty by Suspicion	Dorothy Nolan	
1991	City Slickers	Barbara Robbins	
1993	Me and Veronica	Veronica	
1994	City Slickers II: The Legend of Curly's Gold	Barbara Robbins	
1997	Bongwater	Mom	
1998	Dancer, Texas Pop. 81	Mrs. Lusk	
1999	Nightmare in Big Sky Country	Judge	
2005	The Naked Brothers Band: The Movie	Patricia Wettig	Cameo appearance

=== Television films ===
Year	Title	Role	Notes
1982	Parole	Maureen	
1988	Police Story: Cop Killer	Dede Mandell	
1991	Silent Motive	Laura Bardell	
1992	Taking Back My Life: The Nancy Ziegenmeyer Story	Nancy Ziegenmeyer	
1994	Parallel Lives	Rebecca Ferguson Stone	
1995	The Langoliers	Laurel Stevenson	Miniseries
1995	Nothing But the Truth	Jill Ross	
1995	Kansas	Virginia 'Giny' Mae Farley	Also producer
2005	Lackawanna Blues	Laura's Mother	
2010	The 19th Wife	BeckyLyn	

=== Television series ===
Year	Title	Role	Notes
1984	Remington Steele	Barbara Frick	Episode: "Blood Is Thicker Than Steele"
1985	Hill Street Blues	Mrs. Florio	Episode: "The Life and Time of Dominic Florio Jr."
1986	Stingray	Annie Murray	Episode: "Below the Line"
1986–1987	St. Elsewhere	Joanne	6 episodes
1987	L.A. Law	Carolyn Glasband	Episode: "Beef Jerky"
1987–1991	thirtysomething	Nancy Krieger Weston	64 episodes
1995	Courthouse	Judge Justine Parkes	11 episodes
1997	Frasier	Stephanie	Episode: "To Kill a Talking Bird"
1998–1999	L.A. Doctors	Eleanor Riggs-Cattan	8 episodes
2001	The Practice	Allison Tucker	Episode: "Vanished: Part 2"
2002	Breaking News	Alison Dunne	5 episodes
2002	Boomtown	Nora Jean Flannery	Episode: "Reelin' in the Years"
2002–2004	Alias	Dr. Judy Barnett	11 episodes
2005–2007	Prison Break	Caroline Reynolds	13 episodes
2006–2011	Brothers & Sisters	Holly Harper	85 episodes
2014	Identity	Liana Grant	Unsold TV pilot
2015	Major Crimes	Judge Virginia Ryan	Episode: "Fifth Dynasty"
2019	Heartstrings	Harper Cantrell	Episode: "Sugar Hill"

== Awards and nominations ==
Year	Award	Category	Work	Result
1988	Emmy Award	Outstanding Supporting Actress in a Drama Series	thirtysomething	Won
1990	Emmy Award	Outstanding Lead Actress in a Drama Series	thirtysomething	Won
1990	Q Award	Best Supporting Actress in a Quality Drama Series	thirtysomething	Nominated
1991	Golden Globes Awards	Best Actress – Television Series Drama	thirtysomething	Won
1991	Emmy Award	Outstanding Lead Actress in a Drama Series	thirtysomething	Won
1991	Q Award	Best Actress in a Quality Drama Series	thirtysomething	Nominated
2008	Gold Derby Awards	Ensemble of the Year	Brothers & Sisters	Nominated
