= 2021 Haderslev municipal election =

← 2017	16 November 2021	2025 →

All 31 seats to the Haderslev Municipal Council 16 seats needed for a majority
- Turnout: 30,363 (68.3%) ▼5.1pp
	First party	Second party	Third party
	A	V	C
Party	Social Democrats	Venstre	Conservatives
Last election	10 seats, 30.9%	9 seats, 26.4%	1 seat, 4.3%
Seats won	10	9	5
Seat change	0	0	▲4
Popular vote	9,001	8,021	3,877
Percentage	30.2%	26.9%	13.0%
Swing	▼0.7%	▲0.5%	▲8.7%
	Fourth party	Fifth party	Sixth party
	D	O	B
Party	New Right	Danish People's Party	Social Liberals
Last election	0 seats, 1.2%	4 seats, 12.2%	1 seat, 5.7%
Seats won	2	1	1
Seat change	▲2	▼3	0
Popular vote	1,690	1,584	1,430
Percentage	5.7%	5.3%	4.8%
Swing	▲4.5%	▼6.9%	▼0.9%
	Seventh party	Eighth party	Ninth party
	Ø	F	S
Party	Red–Green Alliance	Green Left	Schleswig Party
Last election	2 seats, 5.9%	1 seat, 3.3%	1 seat, 2.2%
Seats won	1	1	1
Seat change	▼1	0	0
Popular vote	1,298	1,041	815
Percentage	4.4%	3.5%	2.7%
Swing	▼1.5%	▲0.2%	▲0.5%
Mayor before election
Hans Peter Geil
Venstre
Mayor after election
Mads Skau
Venstre

Hans Peter Geil, from Venstre, had been mayor of Haderslev Municipality for the last two terms. However he announced in September 2020, that he would not stand to be re-elected for a third term. In December 2020 it was announced that the top candidate for Venstre in this election would be Mads Skau.

In the 2017 Haderslev municipal election, parties of the traditional blue bloc had won 16 of 31 seats and a slim majority. For this election, a majority between the traditional blue bloc parties would once again be won. However, the parties and their total seats would change rather dramatically. While Venstre would keep their 9 seats, New Right would enter the council for the first time with 2 seats, while the Liberal Alliance would lose both of its 2 seats. Danish People's Party would also suffer a 3-seat decrease, while the Conservatives would go from 1 seat to 5 seats. Of the traditional red bloc parties, only the seats number of the Red–Green Alliance would change, decreasing by one. It was later confirmed that Venstre would once again hold the mayor position, and Mads Skau would become the new mayor.

== Electoral system ==
For elections to Danish municipalities, a number varying from 9 to 31 are chosen to be elected to the municipal council. The seats are then allocated using the D'Hondt method and a closed list proportional representation. Haderslev Municipality had 31 seats in 2021

Unlike in Danish General Elections, in elections to municipal councils, electoral alliances are allowed.

== Electoral alliances ==
=== Electoral Alliance 1 ===
Party		Political alignment
K	Christian Democrats	Centre to Centre-right
S	Schleswig Party	Centre (Regionalism)
Å	The Alternative	Centre-left to Left-wing

=== Electoral Alliance 2 ===
Party		Political alignment
B	Social Liberals	Centre to Centre-left
C	Conservatives	Centre-right

=== Electoral Alliance 3 ===
Party		Political alignment
F	Green Left	Centre-left to Left-wing
Ø	Red–Green Alliance	Left-wing to Far-Left

=== Electoral Alliance 4 ===
Party		Political alignment
D	New Right	Right-wing to Far-right
I	Liberal Alliance	Centre-right to Right-wing
O	Danish People's Party	Right-wing to Far-right
V	Venstre	Centre-right

== Results by polling station ==
U = Sammenhæng

Division	A	B	C	D	F	I	K	O	S	U	V	Ø	Å
Division	%	%	%	%	%	%	%	%	%	%	%	%	%
Gram	23.9	2.4	6.0	8.7	3.4	0.2	1.5	8.2	2.2	0.0	39.9	2.6	1.1
Arnum	20.3	2.4	5.9	12.8	0.9	0.9	3.3	11.3	3.3	0.2	35.0	2.8	0.7
Tiset	15.8	2.0	8.6	11.8	2.6	0.0	3.3	9.9	3.3	0.0	37.5	3.3	2.0
Fole	14.3	2.0	4.9	10.8	3.9	0.5	1.0	5.9	1.5	0.0	51.2	1.5	2.5
Haderslev Syd-Vest	28.0	8.5	17.3	4.7	4.3	0.3	1.5	3.9	3.5	0.5	20.9	5.6	0.9
Haderslev Syd	36.7	5.2	11.5	4.6	4.4	0.1	3.1	6.7	3.7	0.3	15.8	6.6	1.4
Haderslev Vest	30.1	8.5	15.8	3.9	3.5	0.3	2.1	3.2	2.9	0.4	22.4	5.7	1.3
Haderslev Midtby	30.3	6.1	16.4	4.1	4.6	0.5	1.0	5.1	3.4	0.3	17.4	9.6	1.2
Moltrup	20.3	5.4	8.1	9.8	2.4	0.0	4.1	3.4	2.0	0.3	40.3	3.1	0.7
Haderslev Øst	33.4	10.5	14.8	2.7	2.9	0.1	1.7	3.7	2.8	0.2	19.2	6.9	1.0
Haderslev Nord	36.7	6.7	13.4	3.3	4.9	0.3	1.6	4.0	2.2	0.2	17.2	7.2	2.3
Sommersted	25.9	1.7	9.6	7.0	3.3	0.9	3.6	5.5	2.5	0.4	36.3	1.1	2.1
Hoptrup	24.7	2.7	14.1	6.0	7.2	0.0	1.9	6.9	12.4	0.0	18.2	4.8	1.2
Starup	33.0	4.9	20.3	4.1	4.4	0.2	1.0	3.9	1.8	0.2	22.3	3.3	0.6
Vilstrup	21.4	2.8	7.5	5.6	3.5	0.2	1.9	7.7	4.5	0.0	38.7	4.9	1.2
Kelstrup	22.6	5.9	16.4	6.3	1.7	0.3	1.0	6.3	2.4	0.0	32.4	4.2	0.3
Aarø	25.2	2.8	5.6	9.3	1.9	0.0	0.9	9.3	6.5	0.0	36.4	1.9	0.0
Øsby	27.3	4.3	14.6	5.4	2.6	0.5	1.1	8.7	2.1	0.1	27.3	4.0	2.1
Aastrup	31.0	8.8	14.3	3.0	4.8	0.5	1.9	5.2	1.8	0.6	22.6	3.9	1.5
Vonsbæk	34.4	2.5	11.9	9.8	3.7	0.0	0.4	6.6	4.1	0.8	19.3	5.7	0.8
Marstrup	28.9	5.4	17.9	9.6	1.9	0.4	1.5	8.1	2.1	0.2	20.4	3.1	0.4
Halk	22.0	7.8	11.9	7.8	3.4	0.3	1.3	3.4	5.4	0.0	27.5	7.0	2.3
Fjelstrup	44.0	1.8	7.6	7.8	2.5	0.3	1.4	6.9	1.3	0.0	22.3	3.0	1.0
Bevtoft	22.0	1.2	4.7	11.5	2.9	0.1	6.3	5.7	1.2	0.4	41.9	1.5	0.7
Hammelev	25.3	2.6	9.2	3.9	2.3	1.3	0.8	3.9	1.6	0.3	45.0	2.4	1.2
Skrydstrup	28.0	2.9	14.0	5.6	1.1	1.3	1.5	6.7	1.3	0.4	33.3	2.5	1.3
Vojens Vest	37.9	2.2	14.9	4.4	3.5	0.4	0.1	5.2	1.1	0.1	26.8	2.3	1.1
Vojens Øst	37.3	1.7	15.0	6.0	2.5	0.7	0.2	5.2	1.6	0.3	26.5	1.5	1.4
Jegerup	32.9	1.4	10.4	6.1	4.3	1.8	0.7	4.6	1.4	0.0	34.3	1.8	0.4
Simmersted	25.7	1.3	8.6	11.8	1.9	0.0	7.5	3.2	5.1	0.0	32.1	1.6	1.3
Nustrup	22.4	2.0	7.3	6.5	2.7	0.2	0.7	5.1	2.6	0.3	47.6	1.4	1.2
Oksenvad	20.3	0.9	9.7	8.1	3.1	0.3	1.3	8.4	7.8	0.3	36.6	2.2	0.9
Over Jerstal	26.2	1.7	5.1	8.6	1.6	0.3	0.8	4.0	0.9	0.6	46.7	2.5	0.9
Vedsted	27.6	1.3	9.6	7.5	1.8	0.2	0.9	4.6	1.1	2.6	38.4	3.1	1.3

== Results ==
Party		Votes	%	+/-	Seats	+/-
Haderslev Municipality
A	Social Democrats	9,001	30.19	-0.69	10	0
V	Venstre	8,021	26.90	+0.46	9	0
C	Conservatives	3,877	13.00	+8.69	5	+4
D	New Right	1,690	5.67	+4.44	2	+2
O	Danish People's Party	1,584	5.31	-6.85	1	-3
B	Social Liberals	1,430	4.80	-0.93	1	0
Ø	Red-Green Alliance	1,298	4.35	-1.52	1	-1
F	Green Left	1,041	3.49	+0.22	1	0
S	Schleswig Party	815	2.73	+0.53	1	0
K	Christian Democrats	486	1.63	+0.39	0	0
Å	The Alternative	370	1.24	-0.04	0	0
I	Liberal Alliance	115	0.39	-4.77	0	-2
U	Sammenhæng	91	0.31	New	0	New
Total		29,819	100	N/A	31	N/A
Invalid votes		116	0.26	-0.08		
Blank votes		428	0.96	-0.10		
Turnout		30,363	68.32	-5.04		
Source: valg.dk
