= 2025 Haderslev municipal election =

Municipal election in Denmark

← 2021	18 November 2025	2029 →

All 31 seats to the Haderslev municipal council 16 seats needed for a majority
- Turnout: 29,653 (66.6%) ▼1.7%
	First party	Second party	Third party
	V	A	C
Party	Venstre	Social Democrats	Conservatives
Last election	9 seats, 26.9%	10 seats, 30.2%	5 seats, 13.0%
Seats won	9	7	3
Seat change	0	▼3	▼2
Popular vote	7,403	6,586	2,912
Percentage	25.5%	22.6%	10.0%
Swing	▼1.4%	▼7.5%	▼3.0%
	Fourth party	Fifth party	Sixth party
	O	F	Æ
Party	Danish People's Party	Green Left	Denmark Democrats
Last election	1 seat, 5.3%	1 seat, 3.5%	Did not stand
Seats won	3	2	2
Seat change	▲2	▲1	▲2
Popular vote	2,869	2,030	1,975
Percentage	9.9%	7.0%	6.8%
Swing	▲4.6%	▲3.5%	New
	Seventh party	Eighth party	Ninth party
	I	Ø	S
Party	Liberal Alliance	Red-Green Alliance	Schleswig Party
Last election	0 seats, 0.4%	1 seat, 4.4%	1 seat, 2.7%
Seats won	2	1	1
Seat change	▲2	0	0
Popular vote	1,753	1,306	915
Percentage	6.0%	4.5%	3.1%
Swing	▲5.6%	▲0.1%	▲0.4%
Mayor before election
Mads Skau
Venstre
Mayor after election
Mads Skau
Venstre

The 2025 Haderslev Municipal election, in the Danish town of Haderslev, was held on November 18, 2025, to elect the 31 members to sit in the regional council for the Haderslev Municipal council, in the period of 2026 to 2029. Mads Skau from Venstre, would secure re-election.

== Background ==
Following the 2021 election, Mads Skau from Venstre became mayor for his first term. He would run for a second term.

== Electoral system ==
For elections to Danish municipalities, a number varying from 9 to 31 are chosen to be elected to the municipal council. The seats are then allocated using the D'Hondt method and a closed list proportional representation. Haderslev Municipality had 31 seats in 2025.

== Electoral alliances ==
=== Electoral Alliance 1 ===
Party		Political alignment
A	Social Democrats	Centre-left
F	Green Left	Centre-left to Left-wing

=== Electoral Alliance 2 ===
Party		Political alignment
B	Social Liberals	Centre to Centre-left
C	Conservatives	Centre-right
K	Christian Democrats	Centre to Centre-right
S	Schleswig Party	Centre (Regionalism)

=== Electoral Alliance 3 ===
Party		Political alignment
D	New Right	Far-right
I	Liberal Alliance	Centre-right to Right-wing
O	Danish People's Party	Right-wing to Far-right
V	Venstre	Centre-right
Æ	Denmark Democrats	Right-wing to Far-right

=== Electoral Alliance 4 ===
Party		Political alignment
Ø	Red-Green Alliance	Left-wing to Far-Left
Å	The Alternative	Centre-left to Left-wing

== Results by polling station ==
Division	A	B	C	D	F	I	K	O	S	V	Æ	Ø	Å
Division	%	%	%	%	%	%	%	%	%	%	%	%	%
Haderslev Nord	25.8	3.9	11.5	0.1	8.4	4.8	0.7	8.2	3.6	20.7	3.5	8.2	0.5
Haderslev Syd	24.2	3.9	11.5	0.1	8.6	6.0	1.0	9.6	4.2	19.8	4.2	6.4	0.7
Haderslev Vest	26.0	4.0	12.5	0.4	8.5	5.7	0.7	8.2	3.9	21.2	3.6	5.1	0.3
Moltrup	13.6	2.2	7.7	0.0	4.9	7.7	1.3	16.8	2.1	30.8	8.4	3.6	0.9
Fjelstrup	35.8	1.5	6.3	0.3	5.0	10.4	0.3	13.1	1.4	15.9	7.0	1.5	1.4
Aastrup	24.1	4.0	8.5	0.3	11.9	4.9	1.1	7.6	3.4	23.2	4.7	5.7	0.6
Aarø	15.4	0.0	4.3	0.0	2.6	4.3	0.9	11.1	6.8	30.8	19.7	4.3	0.0
Øsby	16.0	3.3	9.5	0.1	8.9	5.7	0.5	9.0	3.5	25.7	11.8	5.1	1.0
Starup Hallen	24.9	2.4	15.1	0.2	8.6	6.3	0.7	8.0	2.4	21.7	4.5	4.7	0.6
Kelstrup	18.0	2.4	7.8	0.2	6.4	5.5	0.7	9.0	5.9	28.7	10.2	4.7	0.7
Hoptrup	15.4	1.8	11.7	0.5	8.9	5.1	1.4	9.5	15.8	16.6	7.8	4.9	0.5
Marstrup	21.2	1.9	11.3	0.6	6.7	5.6	1.5	9.3	3.0	26.6	10.2	1.9	0.4
Hammelev	19.3	1.8	5.4	0.1	4.0	4.6	0.7	8.1	1.9	47.3	5.0	1.6	0.1
Over Jerstal	16.3	1.3	7.6	0.5	5.0	4.4	1.2	10.8	0.8	41.3	9.0	1.6	0.2
Bevtoft	14.0	1.5	2.6	0.3	5.7	4.4	2.7	9.5	0.6	33.0	24.2	1.4	0.3
Skrydstrup	22.3	1.9	12.0	0.8	5.2	4.8	1.0	13.8	1.9	25.0	8.3	2.9	0.2
Vojens	29.5	1.5	13.4	0.4	5.0	4.5	0.8	11.7	1.5	22.0	6.7	2.5	0.5
Sommersted	14.9	1.2	4.8	0.3	3.9	12.5	3.9	14.2	2.9	27.8	11.2	1.9	0.5
Nustrup	13.6	0.9	5.2	0.7	5.6	8.0	0.2	12.0	2.1	40.2	9.9	0.7	0.7
Gram	14.8	2.1	3.9	0.2	4.8	11.0	1.6	10.4	1.3	38.6	8.4	2.3	0.6
Arnum	16.2	2.2	3.0	0.3	2.7	4.6	2.7	14.6	1.1	30.2	20.5	1.6	0.5
Fole	7.3	1.2	4.1	0.0	2.9	6.5	0.0	6.1	0.4	60.0	10.2	0.8	0.4

== Results ==
Party		Votes	%	+/-	Seats	+/-
Haderslev Municipality
V	Venstre	7,403	25.46	-1.44	9	0
A	Social Democrats	6,586	22.65	-7.54	7	-3
C	Conservatives	2,912	10.01	-2.99	3	-2
O	Danish People's Party	2,869	9.87	+4.55	3	+2
F	Green Left	2,030	6.98	+3.49	2	+1
Æ	Denmark Democrats	1,975	6.79	New	2	New
I	Liberal Alliance	1,753	6.03	+5.64	2	+2
Ø	Red-Green Alliance	1,306	4.49	+0.14	1	0
S	Schleswig Party	915	3.15	+0.41	1	0
B	Social Liberals	795	2.73	-2.06	1	0
K	Christian Democrats	307	1.06	-0.57	0	0
Å	The Alternative	154	0.53	-0.71	0	0
D	New Right	73	0.25	-5.42	0	-2
Total		29,078	100	N/A	31	N/A
Invalid votes		116	0.26	0.0		
Blank votes		459	1.03	+0.07		
Turnout		29,653	66.63	-1.69		
Source: valg.dk

== Opinion polls ==
Polling firm	Fieldwork date	Sample size	A	V	C	D	O	B	Ø	F	S	K	Å	I	Æ	Others	Lead
Epinion	4 Sep - 13 Oct 2025	481	26.7	26.1	7.1	–	7.2	1.3	3.7	8.4	2.0	–	1.5	5.9	9.4	0.7	0.6
2024 european parliament election	9 Jun 2024		17.5	21.2	8.8	–	9.4	4.1	3.2	11.2	–	–	1.4	7.1	10.9	–	3.7
2022 general election	1 Nov 2022		30.3	16.6	4.3	7.6	3.5	1.8	2.4	4.9	–	1.0	1.4	6.3	11.3	–	13.7
2021 regional election	16 Nov 2021		24.8	43.0	6.1	5.6	5.6	3.1	4.2	4.2	–	1.7	0.5	0.6	–	–	18.2
2021 municipal election	16 Nov 2021		30.2 (10)	26.9 (9)	13.0 (5)	5.7 (2)	5.3 (1)	4.8 (1)	4.4 (1)	3.5 (1)	2.7 (1)	1.6 (0)	1.2 (0)	0.4 (0)	–	–	3.3
