= Rasmus Byriel Iversen =

Danish cyclist

Personal information
- Full name: Rasmus Byriel Iversen
- Born: 16 September 1997 (age 29) Marstrup, Haderslev Municipality, Denmark

Cycling career
- Sport: Cycling
- Current team: Herning CK
- Discipline: Road
- Role: Rider

Amateur teams
- 2016–2017: Team Giant Scatto
- 2018: General Store Bottoli Zardini
- 2021–: Herning CK

Professional team
- 2019–2020: Lotto–Soudal

Rasmus Byriel Iversen (born 16 September 1997) is a Danish cyclist, who currently rides for Danish amateur team Herning CK.

== Major results ==
2014
5th Kuurne–Brussels–Kuurne Juniors
5th Omloop der Vlaamse Gewesten
2015
5th Kuurne–Brussels–Kuurne Juniors
2019
1st Young rider classification ZLM Tour
