= Tobias Sommer =

Danish footballer (born 2001)

Personal information
- Full name: Tobias Sommer Sørensen
- Date of birth: 27 November 2001 (age 24)
- Place of birth: Starup, Denmark
- Height: 1.87 m (6 ft 2 in)
- Positions: Centre-back; defensive midfielder

Team information
- Current team: PEC Zwolle
- Number: 8

Youth career
- Starup UIF
- –2017: Sønderjyske
- 2017–2020: Vejle

Senior career*
Years	Team	Apps	(Gls)
2020–2022	Vejle	3	(0)
2020	→ Grótta (loan)	5	(1)
2021–2022	→ Kolding (loan)	27	(2)
2022–2023	Kolding	27	(0)
2023–2026	Sønderjyske	61	(3)
2026–	PEC Zwolle	12	(0)

International career
2019	Denmark U-18	3	(0)
2019–2020	Denmark U-19	5	(0)
- * Club domestic league appearances and goals as of 20:02, 14 November 2026 (UTC)

Tobias Sommer Sørensen (born 27 November 2001) is a Danish professional footballer who plays as a centre-back or defensive midfielder for Eredivisie club PEC Zwolle.

== Career ==
=== Club career ===
Born and raised in the small Jutland town of Starup, Sommer started his football career in the local club Starup UIF. He later moved to Sønderjyske, where his father, Henrik Sommer, was also director. When he was 15 years old, Sommer left the club in favor of Vejle Boldklub.

Sommer worked his way up through Vejle's youth academy and, on 23 January 2020, 18-year-old Sommer signed his first professional contract, which also meant that he became a regular part of the first team squad from the upcoming 2020–21 season. Sommer made his official debut for Vejle on 9 June 2020 in a Danish 1st Division match against Skive IK, where he came on with just under 20 minutes left in the match.

Sommer managed to play five matches before the Icelandic season closed due to the corona situation, and Sommer returned home in November 2020. After that, however, he only played for Vejle's U-19 squad, which is why he was loaned out to Danish 2nd Division club Kolding IF ahead of the 2021–22 season, where his older brother, Sebastian Sommer, also played. In the summer of 2022, his stay in Kolding became permanent when the club bought him from Vejle.

After two seasons in Kolding, where Sommer became a profile in the club and an important part of the club's promotion to the 2023-24 Danish 1st Division, he only managed to play four games in the 1st Division for Kolding before it was confirmed on 19 August 2023 that he had been sold to his former club, Sønderjyske, where he had signed a contract until June 2027.

On 9 July 2026, Sommer joined Dutch club PEC Zwolle in the Eredivisie on a three-year contract, with the club holding an option to extend the agreement for a further season.
