= Højbro Plads 13 =

Building in Copenhagen

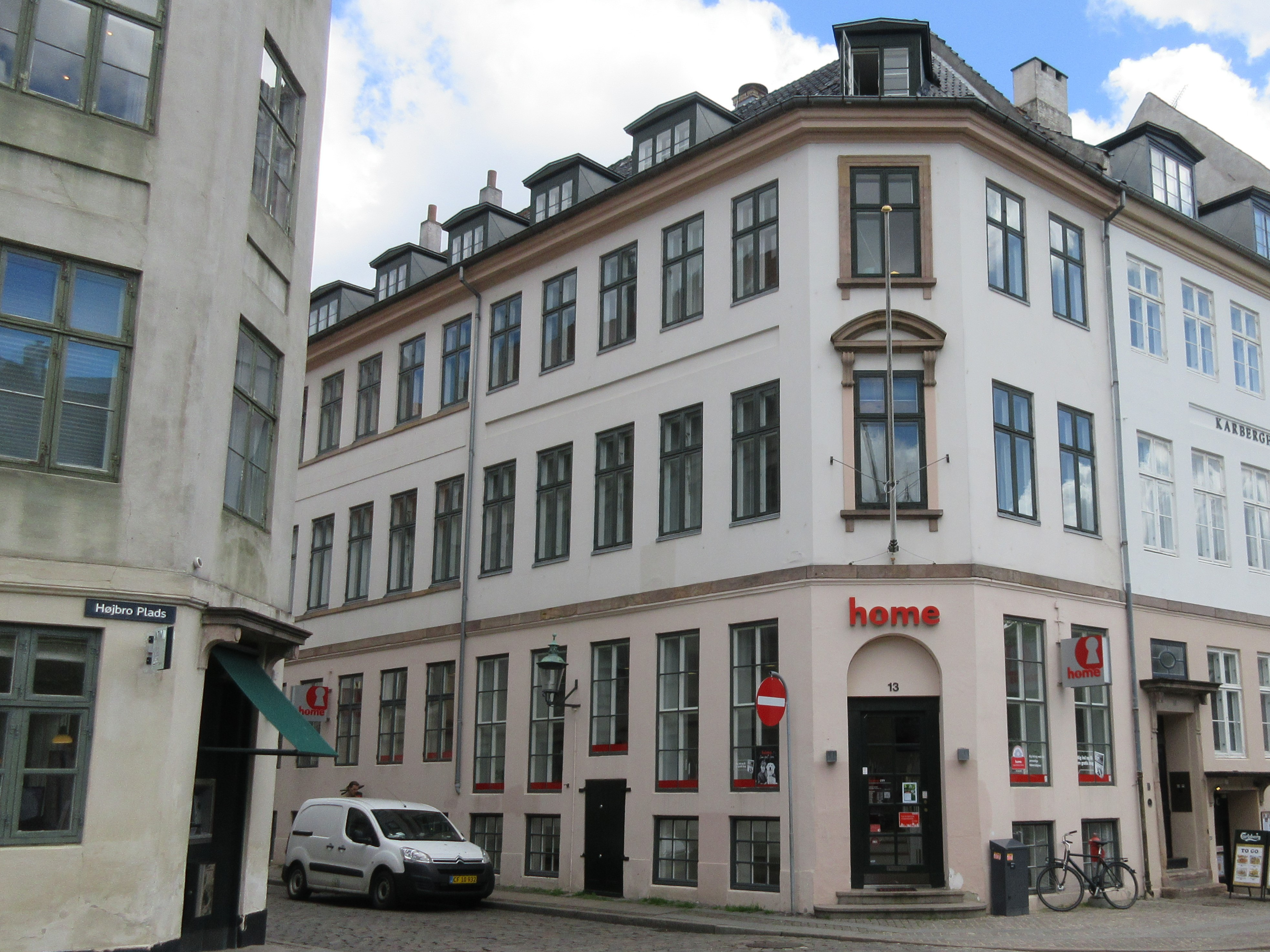
- Interactive map of the Højbro Plads 13 area

General information
- Architectural style: Neoclassical
- Location: Copenhagen, Denmark
- Coordinates: 55°40′42.1″N 12°34′49.58″E
- Completed: 1796

Højbro Plads 13 is a Neoclassical property situated at the corner of Højbro Plads and Lille Kirkestræde (No. 5) in central Copenhagen, Denmark. The building was like most of the other buildings in the area constructed as part of the rebuilding of the city following the Copenhagen Fire of 1795. It was listed in the Danish registry of protected buildings and places in 1950.

== History ==
=== Before the Fire of 1795 ===
The property (then No. 219) was in 1689 owned by one Peter Bech. It was then located at the corner of Lille Kirkestræde and the no longer existing street Store Færgestræde. The property had by 1756 been divided into two properties owned by beer vendor (Øltapper) Johan Lausen's widow (No. 256) and Stephen Thuesen Mørc (No. 257).

=== The current building ===
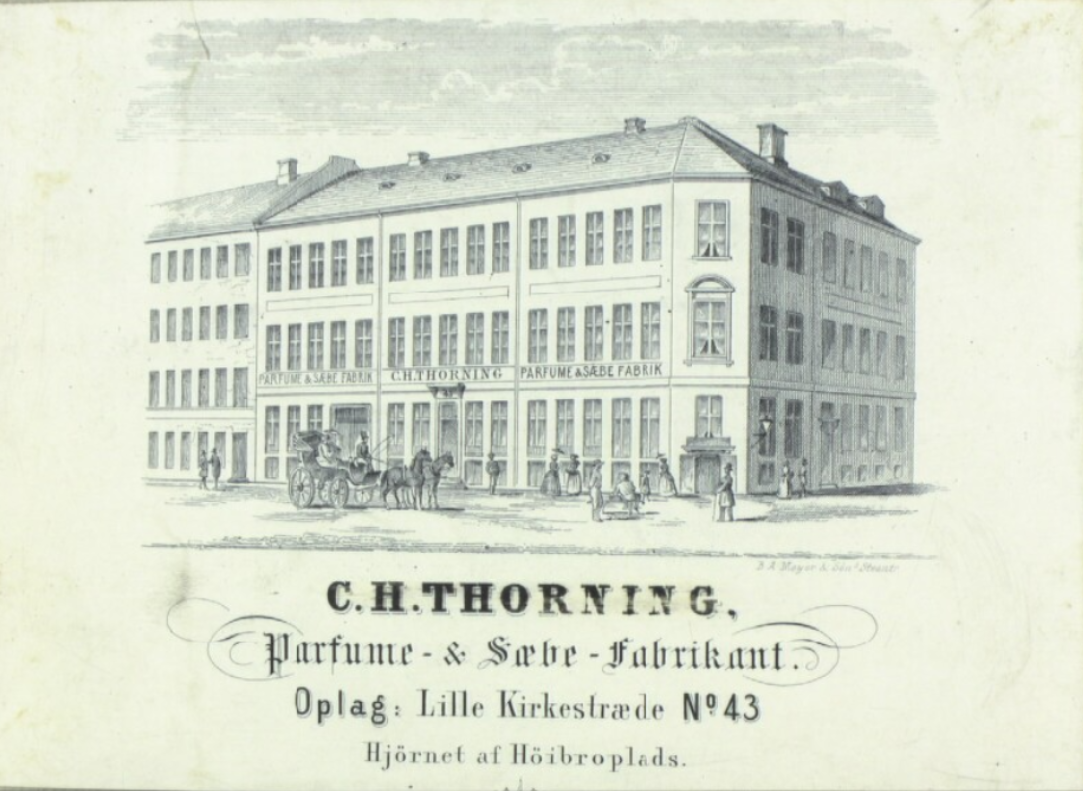
C. H. Thorning, Parfume- & Sæbe-fabrikant

The buildings were destroyed in the Copenhagen Fire of 1795. The square was subsequently created as part of Peter Meyn's and Jørgen Henrich Rawert's plan for the rebuilding of the city. The two lots No. 256 and No. 257, now with a much more visible location overlooking the new square, were both acquired by restaurateur Johan Mortensen Eisen and again merged into a single property. The current building was completed for him in 1796. The adjacent building at No. 255 (now hjbro Plads 15) was built for him in 1797. The corner property was in the new cadastre of 1806 listed as No. 43 and was by then owned by his widow.

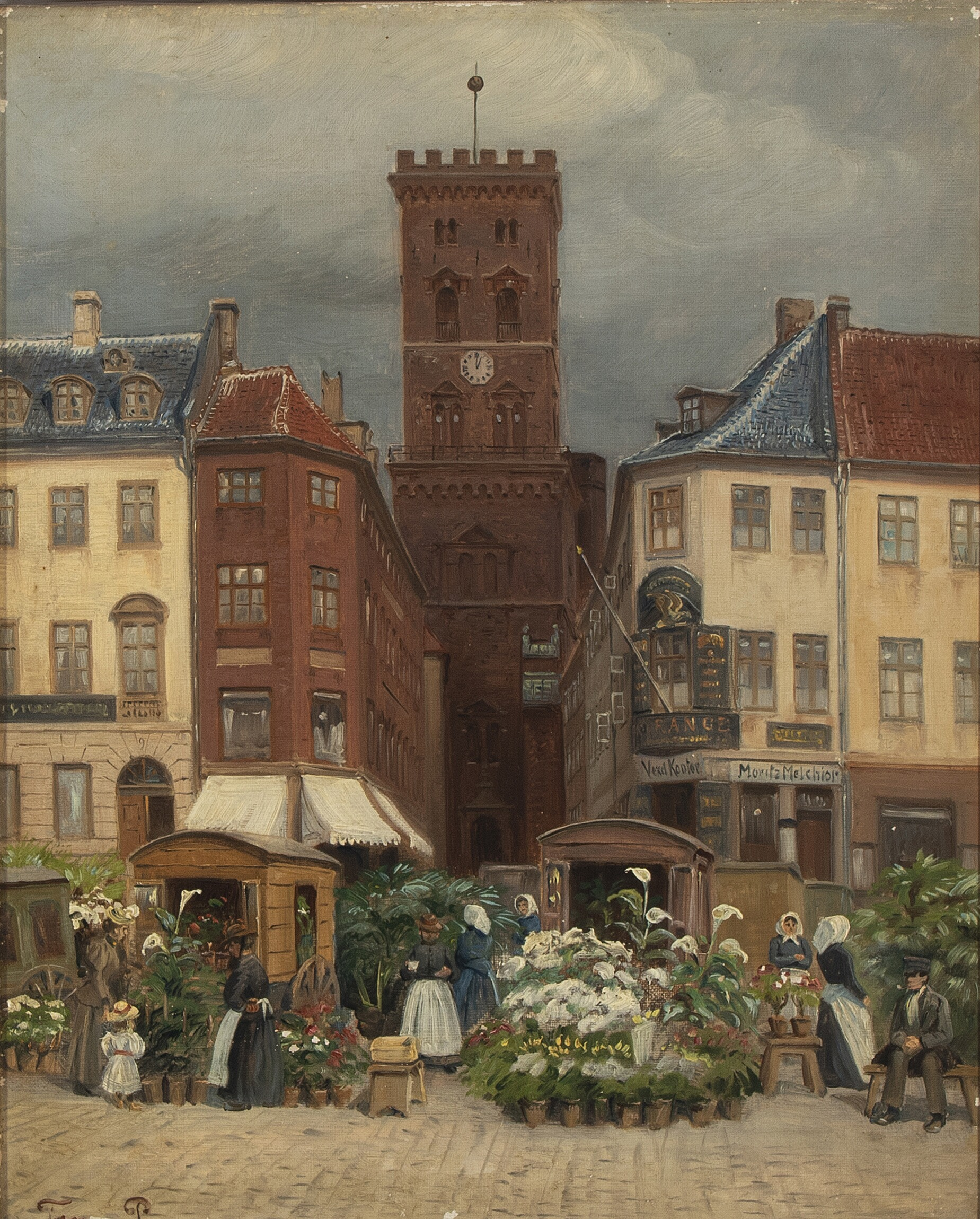
The building seen to the right on a painting by Peter Tom-Petersen.

C. H. Thorning, Parfume- & Sæbe-fabrikant, a perfume and soap manufacturer, was in the middle of the 19th century based in the building.

The singer Johannes Frederik Fröhlich resided in the building from 1832 to 1835. The painter August Jerndorff (1846-1906) resided on the third floor at Lille Kirkestræde 5from 1870 to 1873.

The businessman S. Johannesson was among the residents of the building in 1919.

== Architecture ==
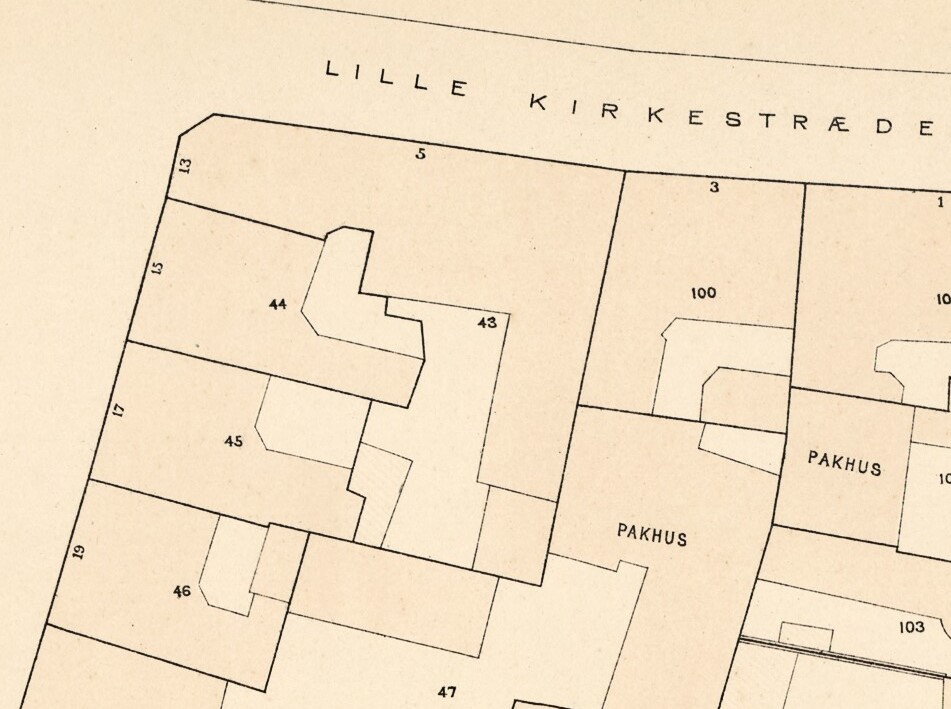
The property seen in a detail from one of Berggreen's block plans of Eastern Quarter, 1886-88.

The building is constructed in brick with three storeys over a walk-out basement. It has a just two bays long facade towards Hæhbro Plads and a 15 bays long facade towards Lille Kirkestræde. The chamfered corner bay was dictated for all corner buildings by Jørgen Henrich Rawert's and Peter Meyn's guidelines for the rebuilding of the city after the fire so that the fire department's long ladder companies could navigate the streets more easily.

== Today ==
The building is owned by the pension fund Finanssektorens Pensionskasse. The ground floor retail space is home to a Home real estate agent.

== Gallery ==
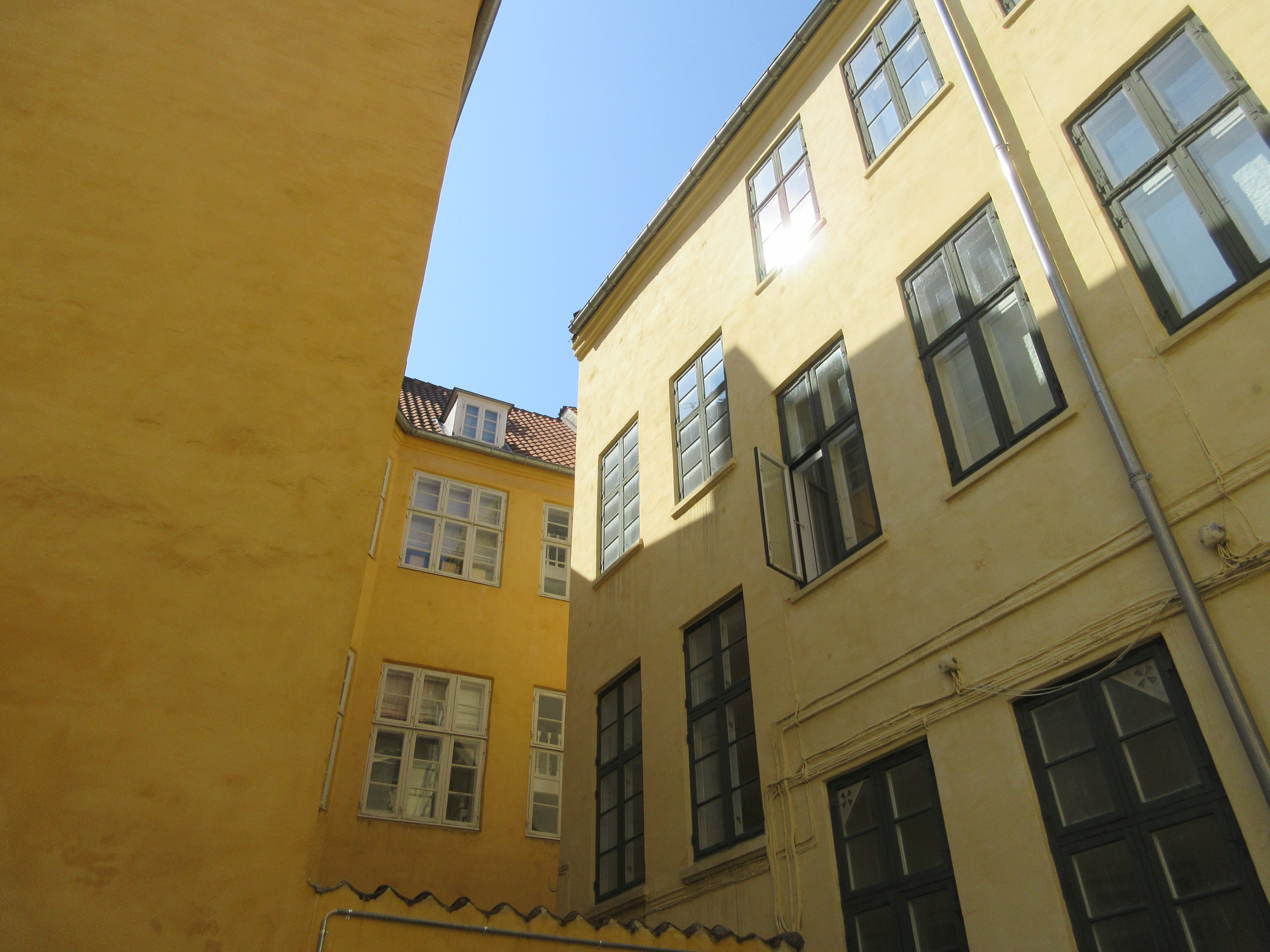
The rear side of the building.
