= Aarøsund =

- Village
- Location in Region of Southern Denmark Aarøsund (Denmark)
- Coordinates: 55°15′37″N 9°42′42″E
- Country: Denmark
- Region: Southern Denmark
- Municipality: Haderslev Municipality
- Parish: Øsby Parish

Population (2026)
  - Total: 294

Aarøsund (German: Aarösund) is a village in southern Denmark situated in the region of Sønderjylland 15 kilometres east of Haderslev. It is also the name of the narrow strait between the village and the island of Årø. It has a population of 294 (1 January 2026) and is part of Haderslev Municipality and the regional entity Region of Southern Denmark, as well as of Øsby Parish.

== History ==
Although it is small, Aarøsund has played a significant part in Danish history. Archaeological surveys have shown the area to have been inhabited since the Iron Age. The abundance of flint tools suggests an even earlier settlement.

In 1231 King Valdemar's cadaster mentions the king's sovereignty of the ferry route between Aarøsund and Assens on the island of Fyn. From 1640 the Royal Danish mail services used the Assens-Aarøsund ferry service (instead of the ferry service connecting Middelfart and Snoghøj) as part of the most important Danish postal route of its day, København–Hamburg.

The ferry estate, close to the waterfront, has sheltered many famous people waiting for a safe fare to Fyn, including many kings. The author Hans Christian Andersen noted his stays in Aarøsund in his travel diaries.

At the end of the 16th century the Danish king, Christian IV, planned construction of a ship in Haderslev, but as the fjord was sanded up, he instead chose Aarøsund to build it.

The current lighthouse, a major landmark, was constructed during the German occupation of Sønderjylland from 1864 to 1920, but the first lighthouse was built as early as 1777.

On the beach, midway between the old harbour and the camping ground, is a German bunker, constructed around the time of World War I. At that time it formed part of "Sicherungsstellung Nord", a German line of 900 bunkers spanning the region of Sønderjylland, constructed to halt a possible English invasion via the coast of Jutland. In the local dialect, Sønderjysk, the bunker is called Æ Unnestan.

== Tourism ==
Traditionally the village attracted lots of tourists in the summer, Danish and foreign alike (especially German), due to its charming fishing village atmosphere, but numerous reconstructions of the harbour have left the waterfront less attractive than before. But it is still considered a prime site for angling.

A couple of kilometres south of the village is Denmark's largest camping ground, Gammelbro Camping, with room for around 900 guests. The seaside hotel Aarøsund Badehotel is another, more luxurious option for an overnight stay. It was built in 1903, but underwent extensive renovation during the 1990s, so that it appears virtually newly built. There are also scores of summer houses close to the beach and a newly-established bed and breakfast.

A marina was constructed just north of the old harbour in 1988 and has a capacity of 151 boats. There is also an old train engine shed, which houses Aarøsund Bådebyggeri, a small shipyard. The area also has a community center and a fishing restaurant.

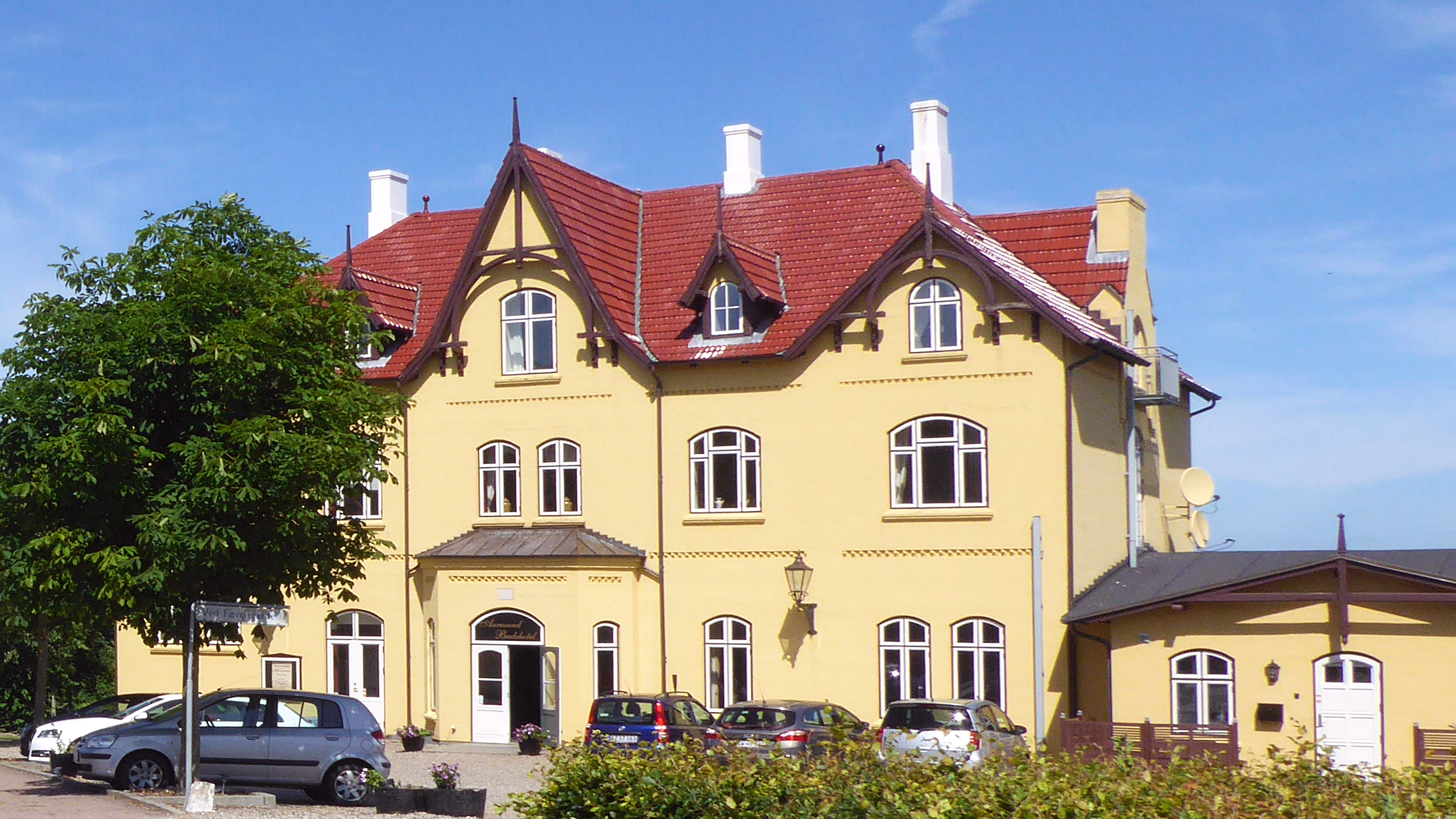
The historic seaside hotel in the center of Aarøsund

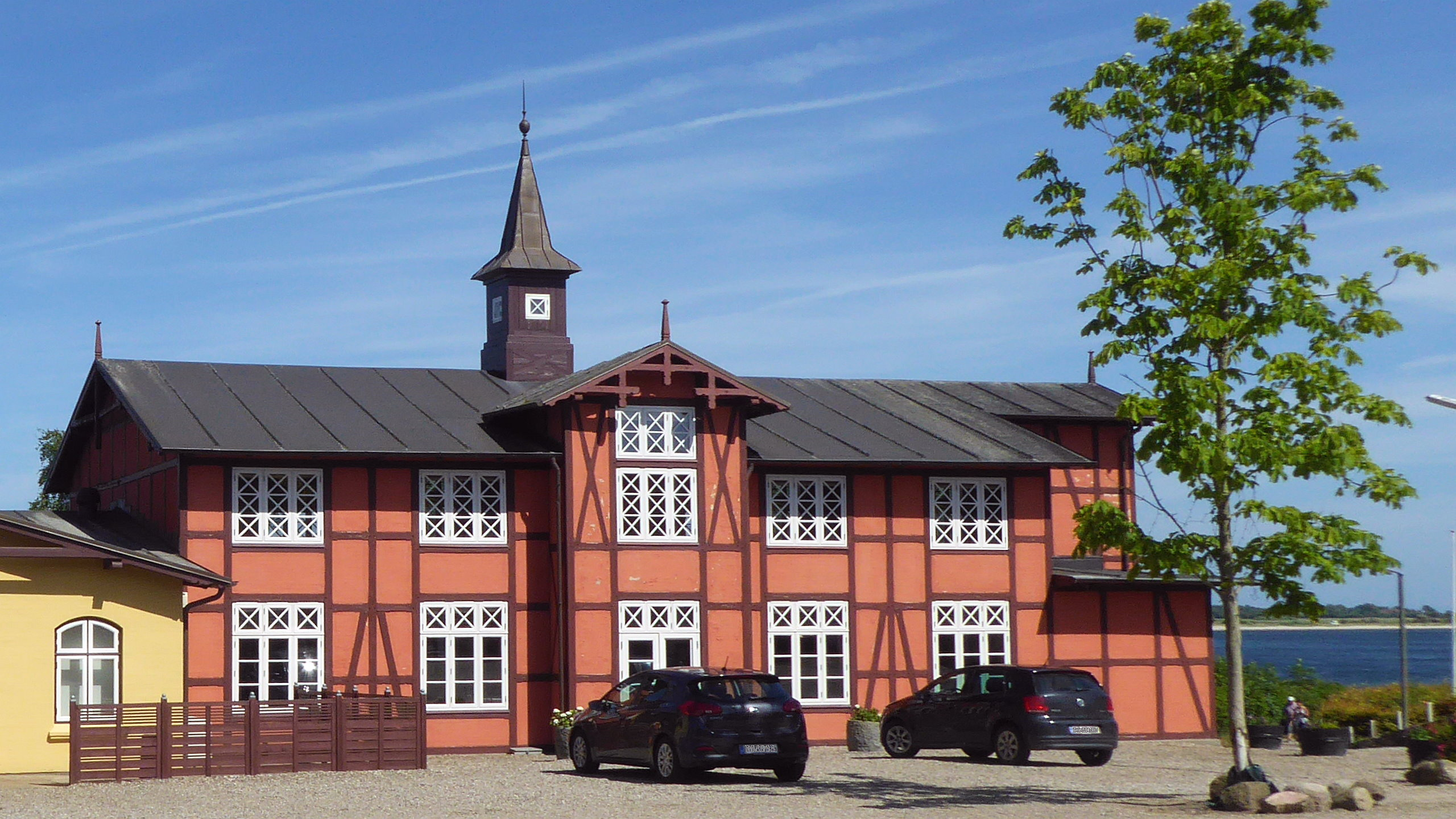
Building in terracotta color at Færgegården in the village Aarøsund

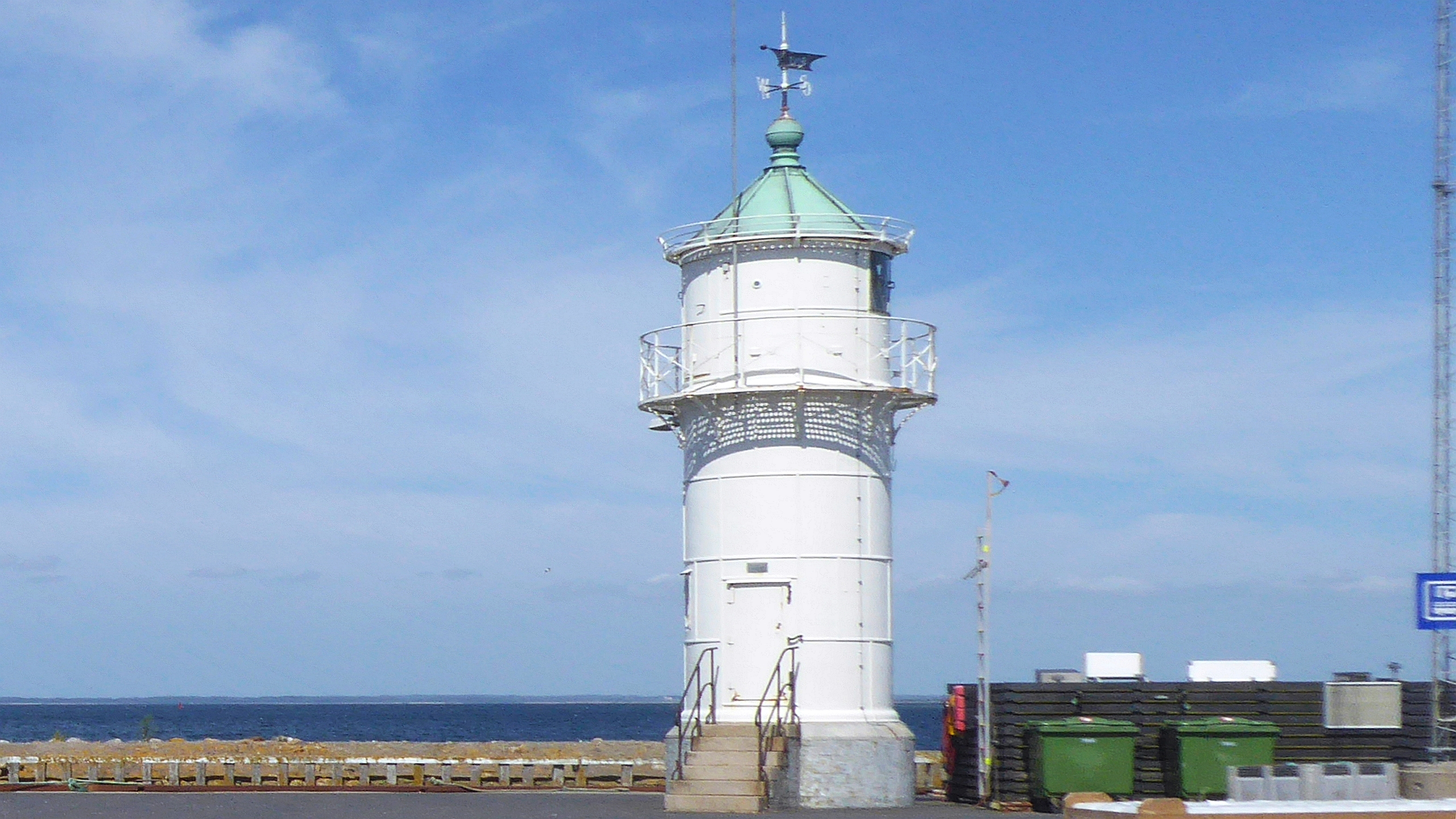
Lighthouse from 1905 (steel construction) at the harbor of Aarøsund

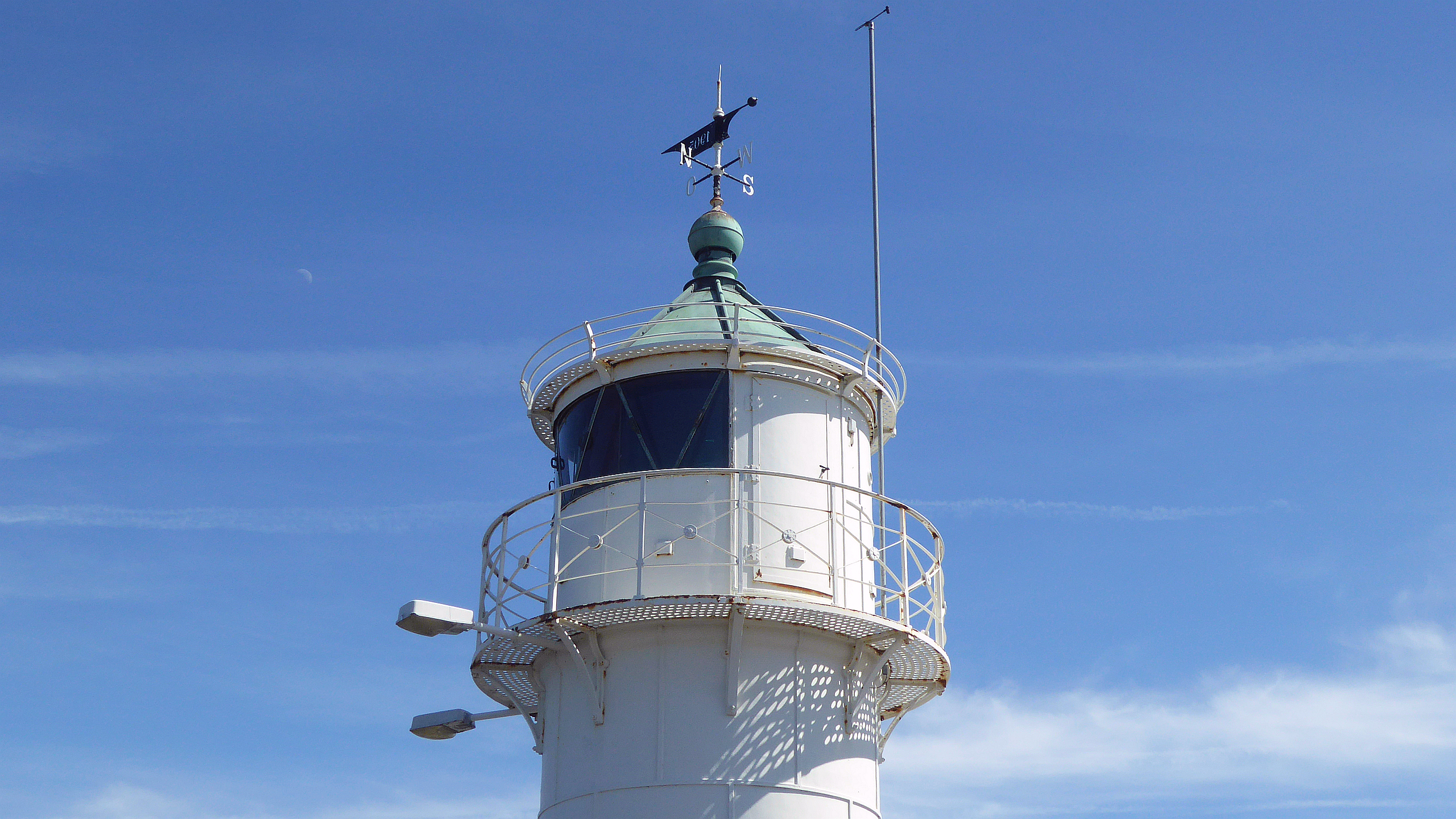
Lantern house at 10 m height from the lighthouse at the harbor of Aarøsund

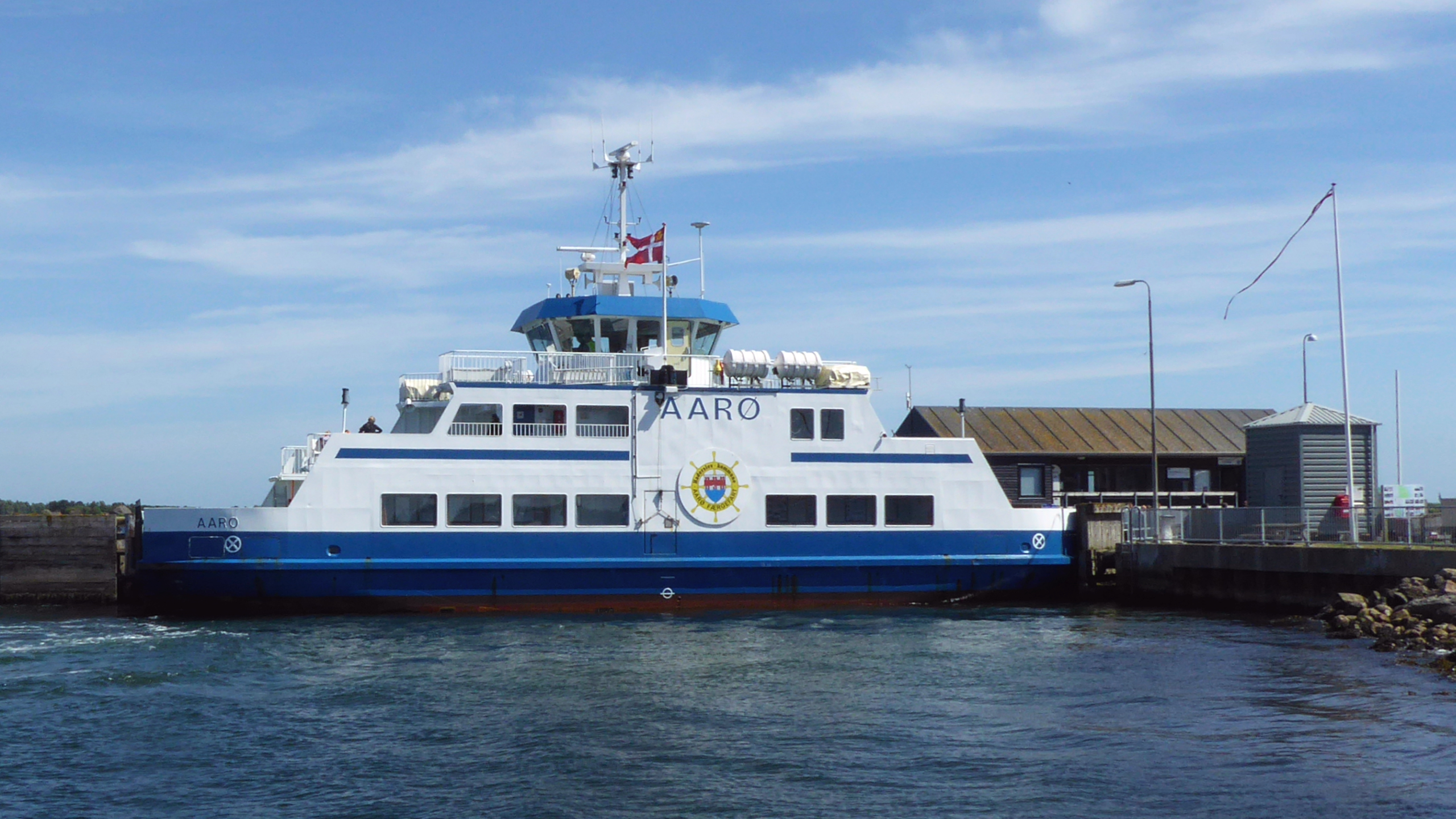
Årøsund Harbour: AARØ ferry

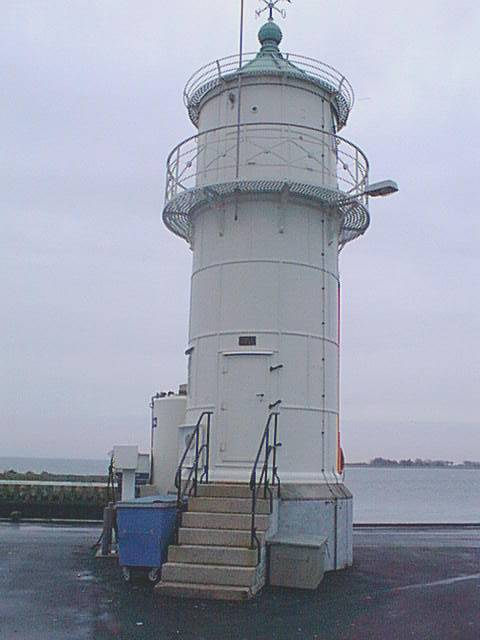
The lighthouse of Aarøsund...

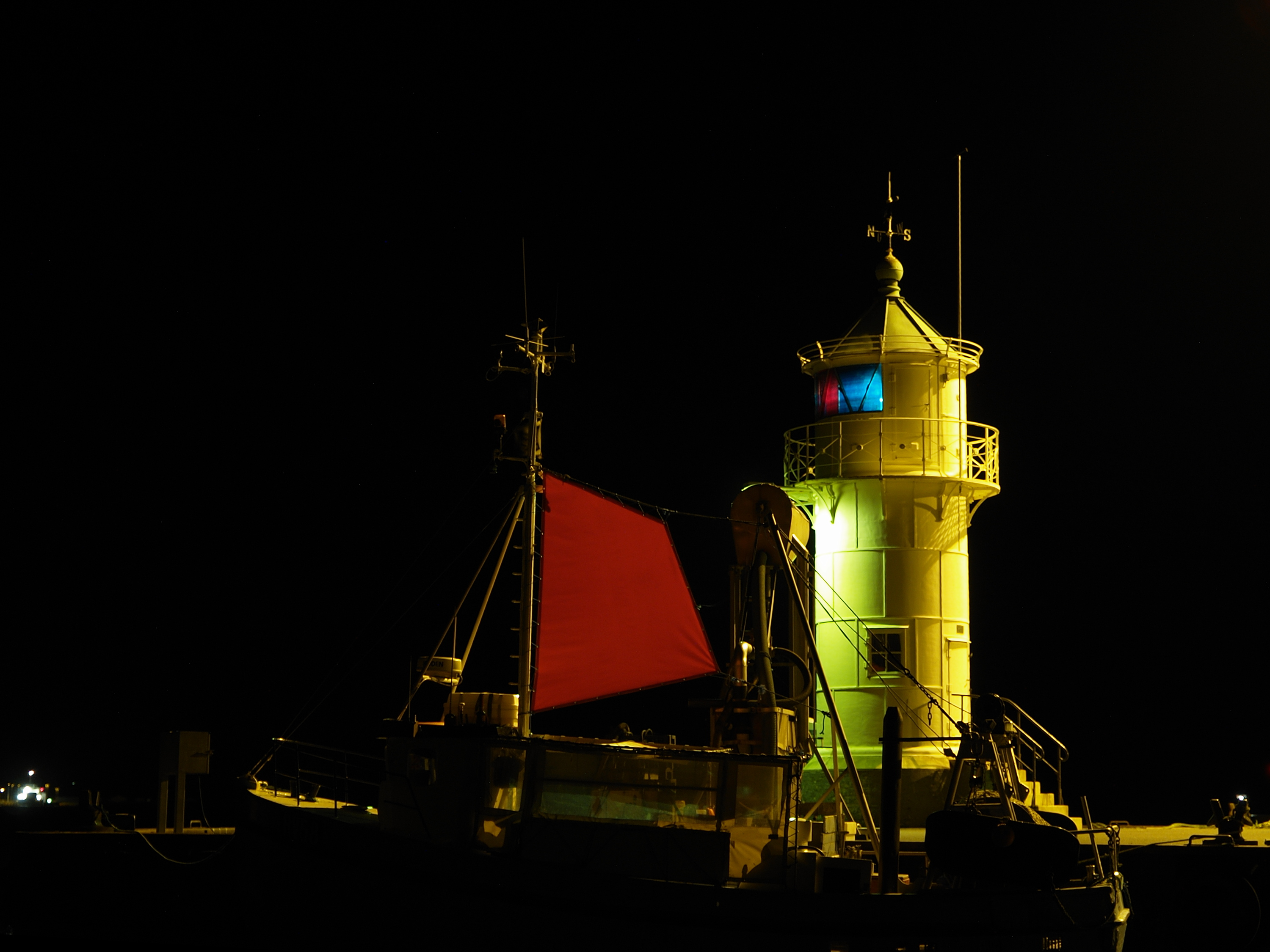
... by night, fire enlighted
