= Årø (island) =

Island in Denmark

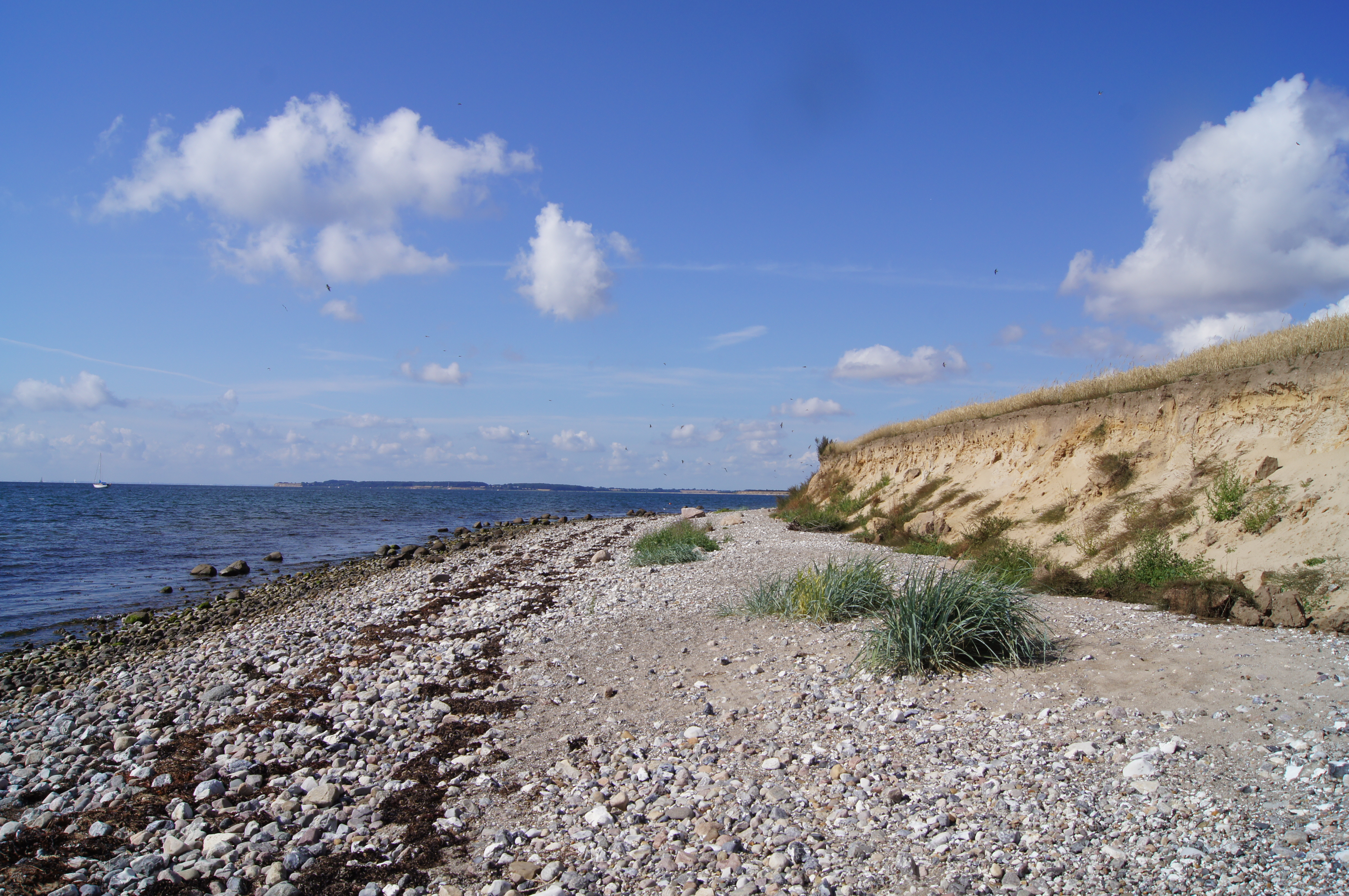
- Årø seashore
- Interactive map of Årø

Geography
- Location: Little Belt
- Coordinates: 55°15′N 9°45′E
- Area: 5.66 km^{2} (2.19 sq mi)
- Highest elevation: 7.6 m (24.9 ft)

Administration
- Denmark
- Municipality: Haderslev Municipality
- Region: Southern Denmark

Demographics
- Population: 151 (2024)

Årø (German: Aarö) is a small island in the Little Belt in Denmark. It is located 16 km east of Haderslev and just offshore from Årøsund.
