= Lene Christensen (footballer) =

Danish footballer (born 2000)

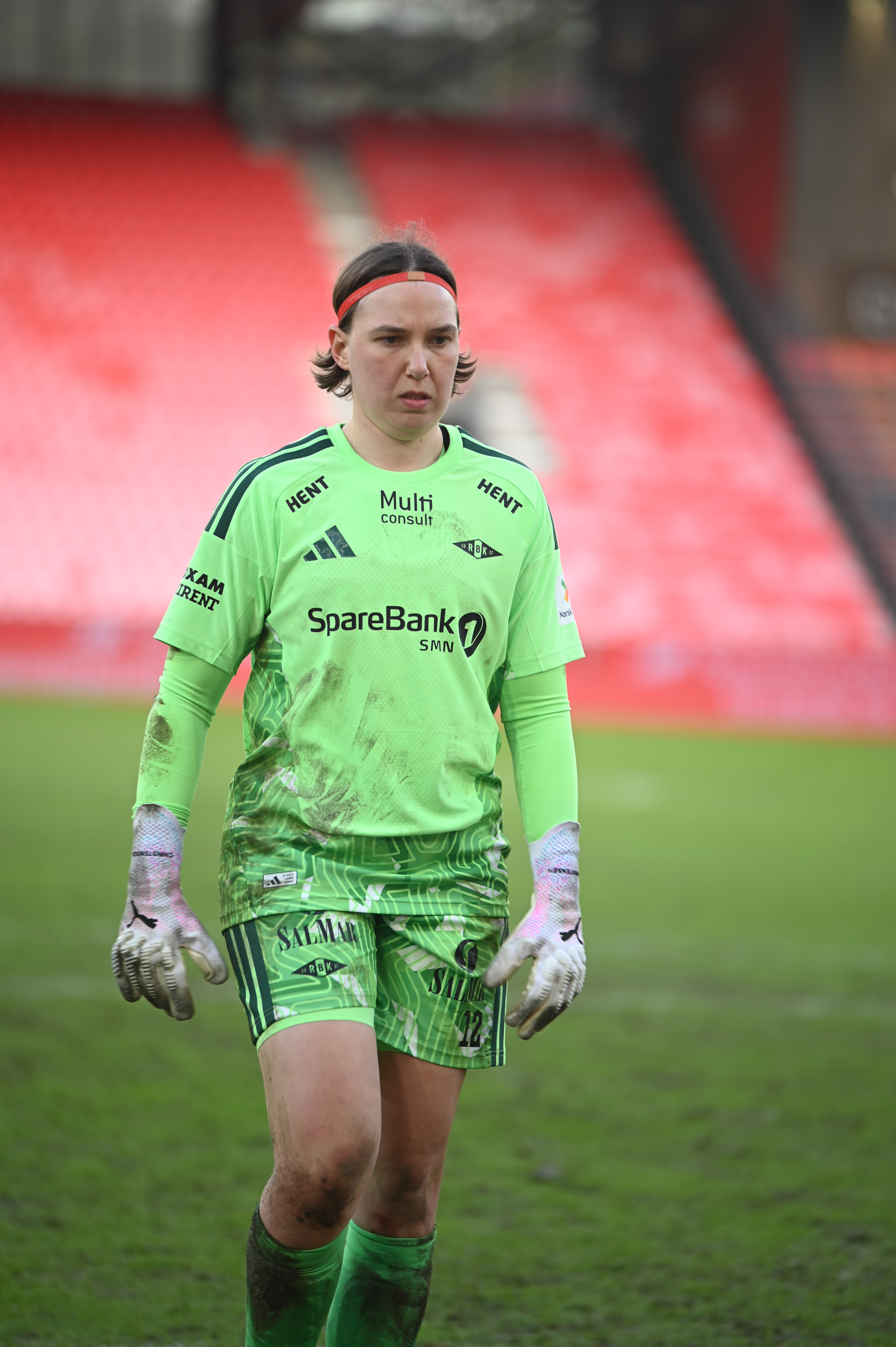

Personal information
- Date of birth: 4 February 2000 (age 26)
- Place of birth: Marstrup, Denmark
- Height: 1.75 m (5 ft 9 in)
- Position: Goalkeeper

Youth career
- –2015: Haderslev FK
- 2015–2018: Kolding IF

Senior career*
Years	Team	Apps	(Gls)
2018–2021	Kolding IF	62	(0)
2022–	Rosenborg	29	(0)
2026	→ Hammarby (loan)	0	(0)

International career^{‡}
2015–2016	Denmark U16	5	(0)
2018–2019	Denmark U19	19	(0)
2019	Denmark U23	1	(0)
2020–	Denmark	31	(0)
- * Club domestic league appearances and goals as of 27 September 2026 ‡ National team caps and goals as of 02:44, 13 August 2026 (UTC)

Lene Christensen (born 4 February 2000) is a Danish footballer who plays as a goalkeeper for Damallsvenskan club Hammarby, on loan from Toppserien club Rosenborg, and the Danish national team.

== Club career ==
Christensen started her senior career with A-Liga club KoldingQ, following two years with the youth teams starting in 2015. She became the first-choice goalkeeper from the 2018–19 season onwards. Christensen was named goalkeeper of the season twice in a row in the Danish A-Liga for the 2019/20 and 2020/21 seasons. In the January 2022 transfer window, after six and a half years with KoldingQ, Christensen signed with Toppserien club Rosenborg BK on a 2-year contract.

Christensen returned to playing in 2026 following a sustained injury and rehabilitation process from 2023 to 2025, during which Christensen renewed her contract for another two years until 2026 with Rosenborg. For the second half of the Damallsvenskan 2026 season, Christensen went on loan with Hammarby, after signing on for an additional year until 2027 with Rosenborg.

== International career ==
She made her debut for the national football team of Denmark on 1 December 2020 in the last UEFA Euro 2022 qualifying match in group B which was against Italy on home ground in Viborg, the match resulted in 0–0 draw. She has also appeared for the Danish national under-16 team and Danish national junior team, several times. In 2019, she made her debut for the Denmark national under-23 team, against Netherlands.

She made her debut for Denmark's senior national team on 1 December 2020 in the European Championship qualifier against Italy, which ended in a draw. Since then, she has become the clear first choice in the national team and was subsequently, on 16 June 2022, selected for national coach Lars Søndergaard's squad for the European Championship 2022 in England.

== Honours ==
=== Club ===
KoldingQ

- Danish Cup
  - Runners-up: 2018

Rosenborg

- Norwegian Cup: 2023
