= Tinkoff (cycling team) =

Russian cycling team

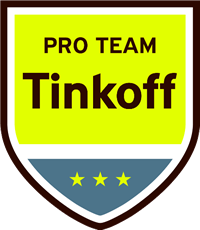

Team information
- UCI code: TNK
- Registered: Denmark (1998–2013); Russia (2014–2016)
- Founded: 1998
- Disbanded: 2016
- Discipline: Road
- Status: UCI WorldTeam
- Bicycles: Specialized
- Components: Shimano
- Website: Team home page

Key personnel
- General manager: Stefano Feltrin
- Team managers: Steven de Jongh (Head Sports Director); Bruno Cenghialta; Tristan Hoffman; Lars Michaelsen; Nicki Sørensen; Pino Toni; Patxi Vila; Sean Yates

Team name history
- 1998–1999 2000 2001–2002 2003–2008 2008 2009–2010 2011 2012 (Jan–Jun) 2012 (Jun–Dec) 2013 2014–2015 2016: home–Jack & Jones; Memory Card–Jack & Jones; CSC–Tiscali; Team CSC; CSC–Saxo Bank; Team Saxo Bank; Saxo Bank–SunGard; Team Saxo Bank; Saxo Bank–Tinkoff Bank; Saxo–Tinkoff; Tinkoff–Saxo; Tinkoff
Tinkoff jersey
Jersey

Tinkoff (UCI team code: TNK) was a Russian-registered professional cycling team from Russia and previously Denmark. It competed in the UCI World Tour. The team was owned by former Tour de France winner Bjarne Riis from 2000 until 2013 and Russian banker Oleg Tinkov, who provided the team's last sponsor, Russian Tinkoff Bank, from 2013 until it closed in 2016.

Founded in 1998 as home-Jack & Jones, the team started in cycling's second division. In 2000 it moved into the top division, now known as the UCI World Tour. Since 2000, under differing sponsor names (Memory Card–Jack & Jones and CSC–Tiscali), the team rode the Tour de France. It has won the overall classification in all three of the Grand Tours. In the 2008 Tour de France, Carlos Sastre won the general classification, Andy Schleck won the young rider classification, and the team won the overall team classification, and Ivan Basso won the 2006 Giro d'Italia, as well as finishing third and second in the 2004 and 2005 Tour de France. The team has also won many major classics, including 6 Monuments.

The team won the UCI ProTour's team classification each year from 2005 through 2007, and the team classification in the 2010 UCI World Ranking.

In March 2015 the team confirmed that Riis had been removed from active duty due to differences between Riis and Tinkov. Media reports had initially indicated that Riis had been suspended when he did not appear at the 2015 Milan–San Remo as planned, and that this was due to a disappointing start to the season for the team. His departure from the team was officially announced on 29 March.

== Philosophy ==
When Bjarne Riis took over in winter 2000, he hired the former Danish Ranger Corps soldier B. S. Christiansen as advisor and they gave CSC a distinct philosophy and training methods. The team works with four values: communication, loyalty, commitment and respect, with the aim of improving teamwork. The team rides for the rider in the best shape on the day, and separates the function of team captain (the rider making decisions) and team leader (the rider trying to win) to avoid pressure on a single rider.

The team staff go on yearly outdoor education trips, physical challenges under pressure. According to B.S. Christiansen, the camps teach people "that they can achieve their goals by cooperating. They have to perform their very best under the worst possible circumstances, where every action has a consequence". Bobby Julich, one of the riders, said that "those days in the bush bonded us much closer and given [sic] us the strategies to work as a team in any racing situation".

== History ==
The company behind the team, initially named Professional Cycling Denmark, was created in autumn 1996 by former amateur cycling world champion Alex Pedersen, Finn Poulsen (representing Bestseller), Torben Kølbæk and Johannes Poulsen (from Herning CK), and Bjarne Riis (then a Team Telekom rider). The team was built on the team license of Danish amateur team Herning CK, with headquarters in Herning, Denmark, with the goal of being picked for the 2000 Tour de France.

=== home–Jack & Jones: 1998–1999 ===
The team was assembled for 1998 with Alex Pedersen and Torben Kølbæk as sports directors. The team started with 11 riders, a mix of first-time professionals with Danish veterans Brian Holm and Jesper Skibby who had competed in the Tour de France several times, Skibby having won stage 5 in 1993. The main sponsors were a Danish real estate agency (home a/s), and a clothes manufacturer (Jack & Jones, a brand owned by Bestseller) and the budget was around €1,000,000 for 1998, including secondary sponsors. The team rode its first season in 2nd Division races, and during the first month both Christian Andersen and Jesper Skibby had minor wins. Holm quit the team in April 1998.

The doping scandal in the 1998 Tour de France didn't affect the team directly, but Riis, who was part of the peloton in the Tour de France, was branded a doping cheat in the Danish media in early 1999. He sold his stock in Professional Cycling Denmark.

The team finished 32nd best of 1998, and with an increased budget of €2,400,000 combined, the number of riders was increased to 14, with riders of a higher standard. In terms of races won, 1999 was the most successful season until 2005: with 26 UCI victories the team was promoted to the 1st Division. In September 1999 Belgian rider Marc Streel was tested with a hematocrit level of 53.4, a value above 50 being an indicator of EPO doping, and he was fired Home stopped sponsoring the team from the end of the season, citing doping.

=== Memory Card–Jack & Jones: 2000 ===
For 2000, Memory Card A/S, a Danish producer of memory cards, stepped in as co-sponsor and Danish cyclist Bo Hamburger was brought in as captain. The 2000 season did not have as many wins as in 1999 but the calibre was higher and the team took part in the 2000 Tour de France.

In April 2000 Nicolai Bo Larsen was tested with a 51 hematocrit level, but wasn't fired, as he had been tested with a 47 level the day before. The morning after his result of 51, he again tested 47%. However, the apparent double standards harmed its image in Denmark and Jack & Jones did not prolong sponsorship, despite Bo Larsen's later being acquitted of doping by a medical report.

In fall 2000, Riis took over Professional Cycling Denmark and the team. After 2000 the contract with Jack & Jones expired, and Riis did not continue working with Memory Card due to their financial difficulties.

=== CSC–Tiscali: 2001–2002 ===
CSC (Computer Sciences Corporation) and the European Internet provider World Online took over as sponsors in a combined sponsorship of €4,500,000. World Online was bought by the Italian telecom giant Tiscali and the team changed on 1 July 2001 to CSC-Tiscali.

In April 2001, Bo Hamburger tested positive with a newly developed method which distinguished natural EPO from synthetic EPO used in doping by determining the percentage of basic EPO. The first test showed 82.3 which was above the maximum of 80 imposed by the UCI, but as his secondary tests showed both 82.4 and 78.6 he was cleared by the Court of Arbitration for Sport (CAS) in 2002. Bo Hamburger was released from his contract with CSC-Tiscali in September 2001.

The team gained international prominence after signing Laurent Jalabert before 2001, following his many years with the Spanish ONCE team of Manolo Saiz. Jalabert said that, "I wanted to retire with a French team, but nobody gave me a good offer, so I went with CSC instead". At the time, CSC was sponsored by the French bike manufacturer Look, which is associated with Jalabert. The team also signed American Tyler Hamilton, formerly of U.S. Postal. The 2001 season was a breakthrough with Jalabert's win of the King of the Mountains competition and a stage on Bastille Day at the Tour de France. The season ended with Jalabert winning the 2001 Clásica de San Sebastián.

In 2002 Hamilton came second in the Giro d'Italia despite a broken scapula. The team also nearly won the team time trial at the 2002 Tour de France, thwarted by a flat tire. Jalabert again won the King of the Mountains and repeated his victory at the Clásica de San Sebastián. He retired at the end of the season.

=== Team CSC: 2003–2008 ===
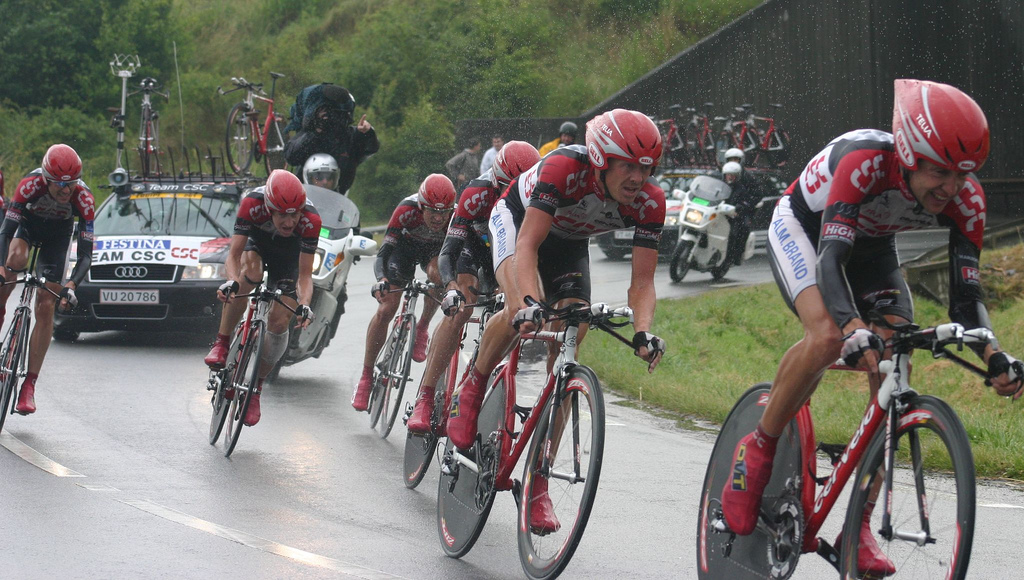
Team CSC, 2004 Tour de France

In 2003, Riis changed Professional Cycling Denmark to Riis Cycling. Tiscali ceased sponsorship, and Riis Cycling was unable to find a new co-sponsor, hence the team changed CSC-Tiscali to Team CSC and continued 2003 on a reduced budget. The headquarters moved from Herning to the headquarters of one of the sponsors, the Danish insurance company Alm. Brand in Lyngby, a Copenhagen suburb.

Hamilton stepped up to be the team leader in 2003, with the goal of winning the Tour de France. He won Liège–Bastogne–Liège and was in form when he broke his collarbone in a pile-up on stage 1 of the Tour. He lost a lot of time. He made it up by winning a stage and finishing fourth, while his teammates Carlos Sastre and Jakob Piil also won stages.

In 2004 Hamilton switched to the Swiss team, Phonak, citing lack of support from Riis. The team brought on Ivan Basso from Fassa Bortolo to join Carlos Sastre in competing for Grand Tour wins. Basso had been a former winner of the maillot blanc in 2002. In the 2004 Tour de France, Team CSC had a very successful Tour, with Basso winning a mountain stage and reaching the podium in Paris with his third place finish. Bjarne Riis and Team CSCs efforts in the 2004 Tour were made into the cycling movie Overcoming.

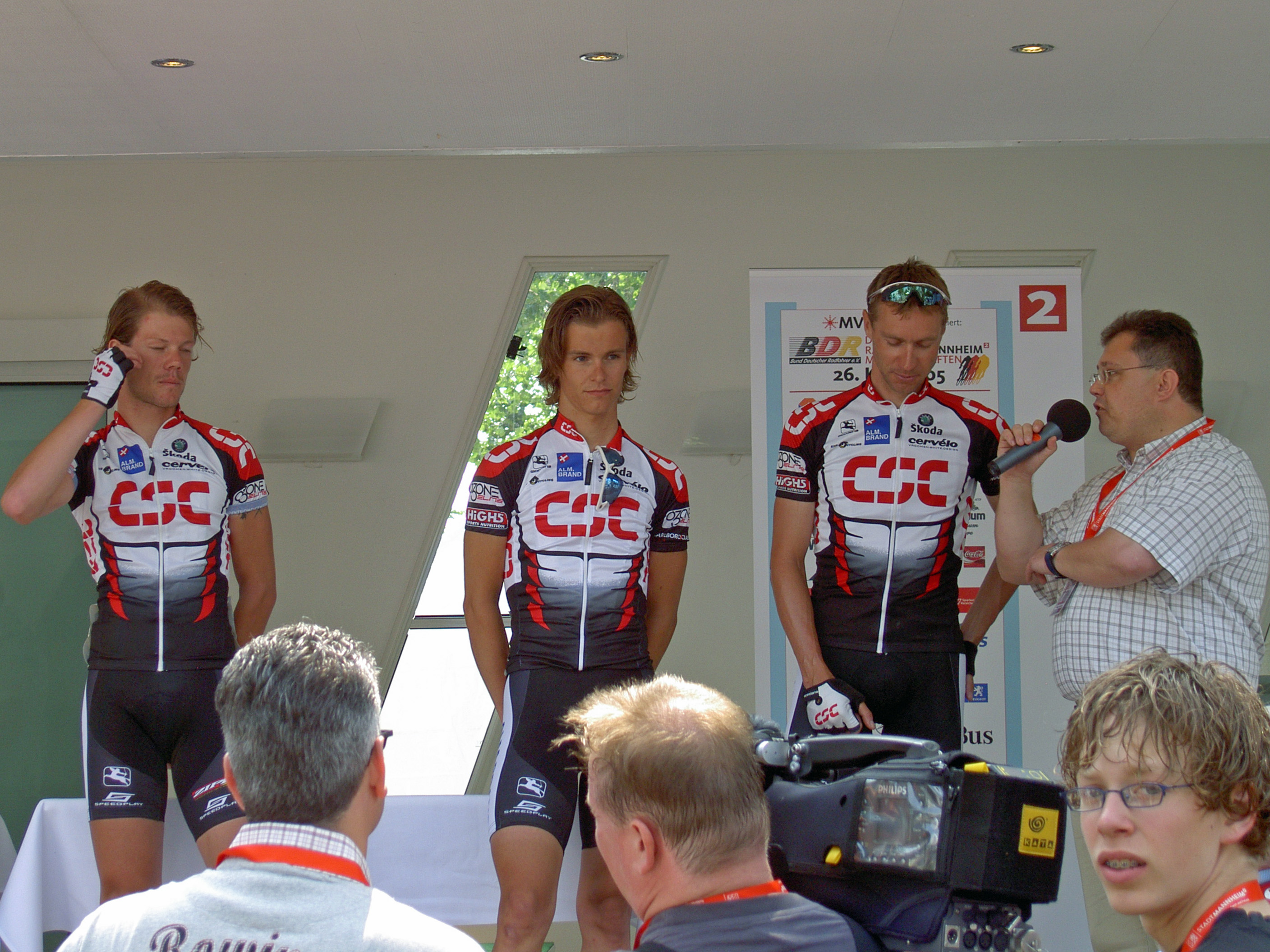
Christian Müller (left), Linus Gerdemann (middle) and Jens Voigt at the 2005 German Time Trial Championship

Following an off-season marred by financial difficulties that resulted in wage cuts for most riders, the 2005 spring season was the strongest yet for CSC, with wins by Julich and Jens Voigt. Julich's victory in Paris–Nice made him the first rider to wear the leader's jersey in the new UCI ProTour. This was followed by three team stage wins in the Giro d'Italia, one by David Zabriskie and two by Basso, though the overall victory escaped from Basso when he was beset by a stomach ailment.

Midway through the 2005 Tour de France, CSC extended sponsorship until 2008 at a higher level, enabling Riis to renew the contract with Basso for an additional three years. Basso got second place in the tour and Zabriskie won in the prologue. Julich won the Eneco Tour and Carlos Sastre came second. Nicki Sørensen won a stage of the Vuelta a España. Team CSC won the 2005 ProTour, with Julich as the #8 ranked individual rider of the year, the highest placed rider in the team.

Until 2009, the team used Cervélo bikes and Shimano components. The arrangement with the small Canadian manufacturer worked well for CSC, as Cervélo's strength is time-trials, at which CSC has specialists.

==== 2006 season ====
In 2006, with sponsorship for several years, the focus was to win all three Grand Tours, with Ivan Basso riding both Giro d'Italia and the Tour de France, and Carlos Sastre the Vuelta a España. They had come second in the 2005 in the Tour and Vuelta, respectively. The team had several time trialists, including Zabriskie, who had won time trials at the Giro and the Tour, Julich, as well as Fabian Cancellara. Others included Jens Voigt and Stuart O'Grady from Australia, the only sprinter name in the team.

The first victory of the 2006 UCI ProTour season was in the prologue of Paris–Nice by Julich. The spring was plagued with injuries hitting a third of the team, most notably O'Grady. Cancellara won the time trial at Tirreno–Adriatico and then Paris–Roubaix. Fränk Schleck won the Amstel Gold Race a week later.

Team CSC surprised by announcing that Sastre would ride the Giro as helper for Basso, that he would ride all three Grand Tours. 2005's winner Paolo Savoldelli was strongest in the first stages, and Jan Ullrich took a surprise win in the time trial ahead of Basso, but Basso dominated with three wins on mountain finishes and in the team time trial. Basso won by 9'18''.

On 30 June 2006, the Tour de France announced that Basso would not ride the 2006 Tour after apparent involvement in the Operación Puerto doping scandal. Sastre took over as captain and was the strongest in the favorite group on the last mountain stages, but a poor last time trial placed him fourth overall. The team scored two stage wins, the most impressive Fränk Schleck's win on Alpe d'Huez. Voigt had already won a flat stage after a long break.

The autumn was dominated by the Basso's involvement in Operación Puerto. His contract was cancelled by mutual consent, and the case against Basso was eventually dropped by the Federazione Ciclistica Italiana for lack of evidence, but without him authorizing a DNA test that could have cleared him conclusively. Basso adamantly denied being involved. (On 7 May 2007 Basso admitted involvement in Operación Puerto). Team CSC have since started an ambitious anti-doping program together with the Danish anti-doping expert Rasmus Damsgaard. Meanwhile, on the road, Voigt dominated the Deutschland Tour, winning overall and three stages, including a mountain finish and a time trial. Sastre came fourth in the Vuelta after starting in the lead when CSC won the initial team time trial. It was Sastre's fifth Grand Tour in a row.

==== 2007 season ====
New rider Juan José Haedo gave the team a good start by winning early minor races. The classics season was a success by having O'Grady win Paris–Roubaix. Voigt managed to defend his victory in Tour of Germany. CSC won the UCI ProTour team competition for the third year in a row.

Sastre had a team dedicated to him for the Vuelta, while the team for the Tour was support riders and riders who could make individual results. This left the Giro without a clear rider for the general classification. Instead a youthful team was chosen, with the hope that Andy Schleck might win the youth competition. He won the youth competition and came second overall .

For the Tour, Cancellara followed up a strong showing in the Tour de Suisse with two stage wins and seven days in the yellow jersey. But doping returned when the race hit the mountains. Alexander Vinokourov tested positive and leader Michael Rasmussen was withdrawn by his team for "internal code violations". Sastre finished fourth.

For the Vuelta, Sastre again lost time in time trials, especially the first, but climbed to second place.

Because of the team's link to drug use (Riis admitted doping, and Basso was suspended until 2008), MAN Trucks dropped co-sponsorship midway through 2007.

=== CSC–Saxo Bank: 2008 ===
CSC announced that they would not renew the contract in spring 2008, meaning Riis Cycling A/S would need a new main sponsor from 2009. Mid-June, Riis Cycling A/S announced that Saxo Bank had entered a three-year contract as name sponsor, with immediate effect, so the team entered the 2008 Tour de France as Team CSC Saxo Bank. Carlos Sastre, having taken a lead of about two minutes on the final climb of L'Alpe D'Huez, won the Tour, and the team took the team classification.

=== Team Saxo Bank: 2009–2010 ===
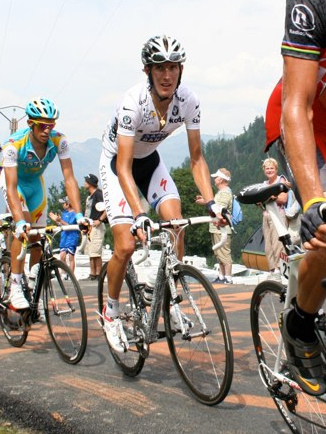
Andy Schleck, riding for Team Saxo Bank during the 2010 Tour de France

It was announced 28 September 2008 that for 2009, IT Factory would be co-sponsor. However, the company went into receivership some two months thereafter. The team also began riding Specialized bicycles for the 2009 season.

=== Saxo Bank–SunGard: 2011 ===
Although Saxo Bank had previously announced that 2010 would be the last year they would sponsor the team along with SunGard as secondary sponsor. The 2011 name for the team was announced in August 2010 as Team Saxo Bank–SunGard, and the signing of 2 time Tour de France champion Alberto Contador on a two-year contract was also revealed. On 29 July 2010, Andy Schleck and his brother Fränk announced their departure from the team effective from the start of the 2011 season.

On 16 November 2011 it was announced that SunGard would no longer be a title sponsor after 2011.

=== Saxo–Tinkoff & Tinkoff–Saxo: 2012 ===
==== 2012 ====
On 25 June 2012 it was announced that the Russian Tinkoff Bank would join the team as co-sponsors for the rest of the 2012 season and through to the end of 2013. Saxo Bank also renewed their sponsorship through 2013, with the team's name thus becoming Team Saxo Bank-Tinkoff Bank.

Alberto Contador returned from his doping suspension and won the General classification of the 2012 Vuelta a España This marked the first overall Grand Tour win since Andy Schleck's retroactive victory of the 2010 Tour de France.

==== 2013 ====
Following the 2013 season Oleg Tinkov purchased the team from manager Bjarne Riis with the team renamed Tinkoff-Saxo.

==== 2014 ====
In March, the team announced the signing of Colombian rider Edward Beltrán on a 2-year contract, Beltran was promoted from Tinkoff-Saxo's affiliate amateur team, Nankang–Fondriest,

==== 2015 ====
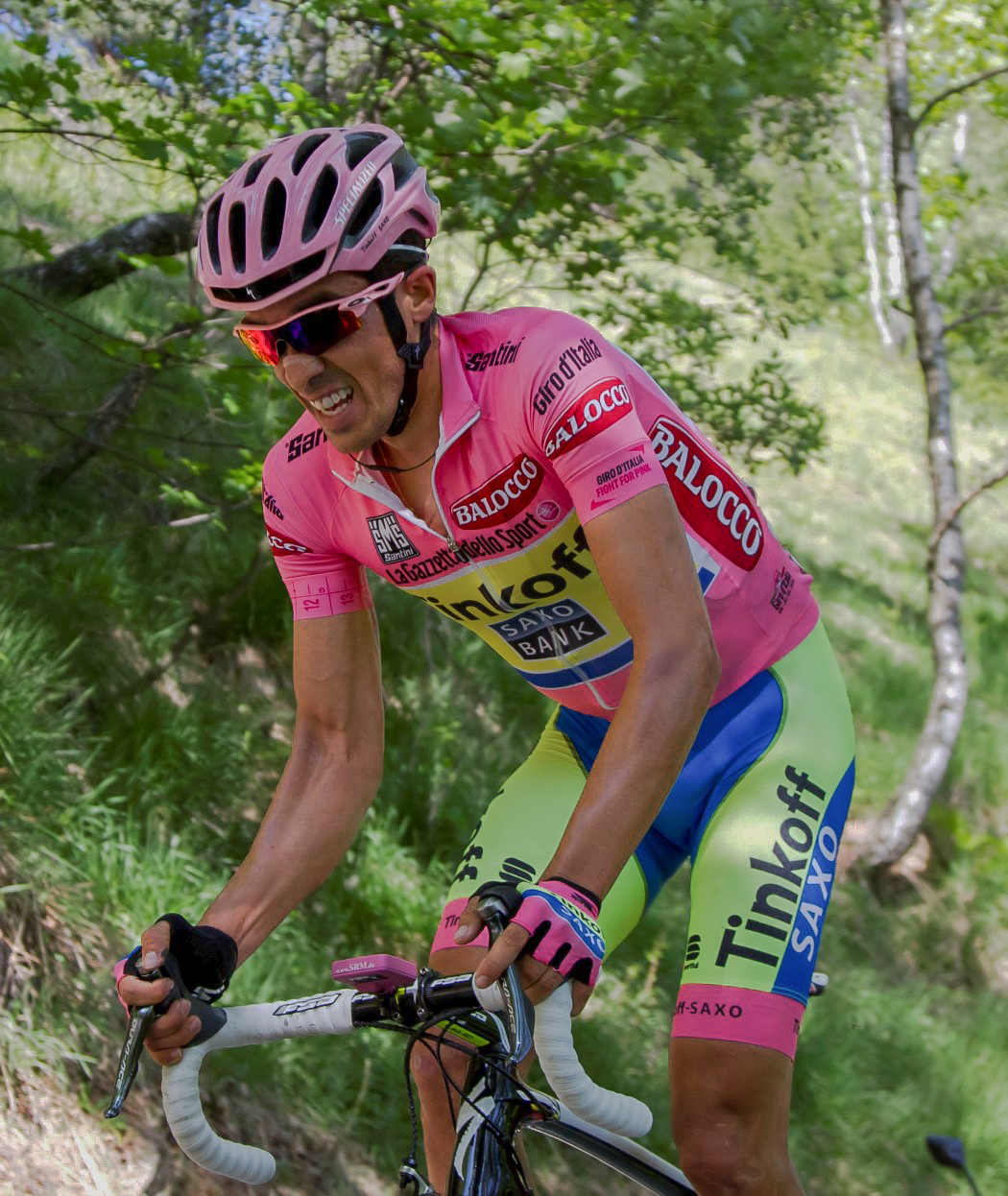
Alberto Contador won the 2015 Giro d'Italia for the team.

For the 2015 season the team announced the major signing of Peter Sagan on a three-year contract, as well as: Pavel Brutt, Ivan Basso. and Robert Kišerlovski.

In March 2015 the team confirmed that Riis had been removed from active duty due to differences between Riis and Tinkov. Media reports had initially indicated that Riis had been suspended when he did not appear at the 2015 Milan–San Remo as planned, and that this was due to a disappointing start to the season for the team. Later that month it was announced that Riis' contract had been terminated with the agreement of both parties. Subsequently the team revealed its new management structure, with Riis' former duties being carried out by new general manager Stefano Feltrin and Steven de Jongh, who was promoted to the role of head sport director.

In a December 2015 interview, Tinkov announced that he would sell the team at the end of the 2016 season, citing on the one hand a business decision to redirect Tinkoff Bank's marketing budget from sports sponsorship to TV advertising from 2017, and on the other a lack of support from other teams from his proposed reforms to the sport's business model.

==== 2016 ====
In February 2016 Tinkov said that although he was "happy to talk to any buyer", he expected that the most likely outcome for the team would be its disbanding at the end of the year. However in July 2016 he said that he was planning to return to the sport after "a few seasons off", once Chris Froome retires from competition, with the aim of winning the Tour de France.

== Final roster (2016) ==
As of 29 March 2016

Rider	Date of birth
Davide Ballerini (Note: Ballerini joined the team on 1 August as a stagiaire, from Hopplà Petroli Firenze.) (ITA)	21 September 1994 (aged 21)
Erik Baška (SVK)	12 January 1994 (aged 22)
Daniele Bennati (ITA)	24 September 1980 (aged 35)
Adam Blythe (GBR)	1 October 1989 (aged 26)
Manuele Boaro (ITA)	12 March 1987 (aged 29)
Maciej Bodnar (POL)	7 March 1985 (aged 31)
Pavel Brutt (RUS)	29 January 1982 (aged 34)
Alberto Contador (ESP)	6 December 1982 (aged 33)
Lorenzo Fortunato (Note: Fortunato joined the team on 1 August as a stagiaire, from Hopplà Petroli Firenze.) (ITA)	9 May 1996 (aged 19)
Oscar Gatto (ITA)	1 January 1985 (aged 31)
Michael Gogl (AUT)	4 November 1993 (aged 22)
Jesper Hansen (DEN)	23 October 1990 (aged 25)
Jesús Hernández (ESP)	28 September 1981 (aged 34)
Robert Kišerlovski (CRO)	9 August 1986 (aged 29)
Michael Kolář (SVK)	21 December 1992 (aged 23)

Rider	Date of birth
Roman Kreuziger (CZE)	6 May 1986 (aged 29)
Rafał Majka (POL)	12 September 1989 (aged 26)
Jay McCarthy (AUS)	8 September 1992 (aged 23)
Andrea Montagnoli (Note: Montagnoli joined the team on 1 August as a stagiaire, from Hopplà Petroli Firenze.) (ITA)	27 July 1995 (aged 20)
Sérgio Paulinho (POR)	26 March 1980 (aged 36)
Evgeni Petrov (RUS)	25 May 1978 (aged 37)
Paweł Poljański (POL)	6 May 1990 (aged 25)
Michael Rogers (Note: Rogers retired from cycling on April 25.) (AUS)	20 December 1979 (aged 36)
Ivan Rovny (RUS)	30 September 1987 (aged 28)
Juraj Sagan (SVK)	23 December 1988 (aged 27)
Peter Sagan (SVK)	26 January 1990 (aged 26)
Matteo Tosatto (ITA)	14 May 1974 (aged 41)
Yuri Trofimov (RUS)	26 January 1984 (aged 32)
Nikolay Trusov (RUS)	2 July 1985 (aged 30)
Michael Valgren (DEN)	7 February 1992 (aged 24)

== National, continental and world champions ==
1999

Danish Time Trial, Michael Sandstød
Danish Road Race, Nicolaj-Bo Larsen
Belgian Time Trial, Marc Streel

2000

Danish Time Trial, Michael Sandstød
Danish Road Race, Bo Hamburger
Latvian Road Race, Arvis Piziks

2001

Danish Time Trial, Michael Blaudzun
Danish Road Race, Jakob Piil

2002

Danish Time Trial, Michael Sandstød
Danish Road Race, Michael Sandstød

2003

Danish Time Trial, Michael Blaudzun
Danish Road Race, Nicki Sørensen

2004

Danish Time Trial, Michael Sandstød
Danish Road Race, Michael Blaudzun

2005

Danish Time Trial, Michael Blaudzun
Luxembourg Time Trial, Andy Schleck
Russian National Time Trial, Vladimir Gusev
Danish Road Race, Lars Bak
Luxembourg Road Race, Fränk Schleck

2006

Austrian Time Trial, Peter Luttenberger
Danish Time Trial, Brian Vandborg
Norwegian Time Trial, Kurt Asle Arvesen
Swiss Time Trial, Fabian Cancellara
USA Time Trial, David Zabriskie

2007

Swiss Time Trial, Fabian Cancellara

2008

Swiss Time Trial, Fabian Cancellara
Danish Time Trial, Lars Bak
Danish Road Race, Nicki Sørensen
Luxembourg Road Race, Fränk Schleck
Norwegian Road Race, Kurt Asle Arvesen

2010

Sweden Time Trial, Gustav Larsson
Denmark Time Trial, Jakob Fuglsang
Luxembourg Time Trial, Andy Schleck
Poland Time Trial, Jarosław Marycz
Denmark Road Race, Nicki Sørensen
Luxembourg Road Race, Fränk Schleck
World Time Trial, Fabian Cancellara
Denmark Track (Madison), Alex Rasmussen
Denmark Track (Madison), Michael Mørkøv

2011

Denmark Road Race, Nicki Sørensen

2013

Denmark Road Race, Michael Mørkøv

2014

Denmark Road Race, Michael Valgren

2015

Denmark Time Trial, Christopher Juul-Jensen
Slovak Time Trial, Peter Sagan
Slovak Road Race, Peter Sagan
Denmark Road Race, Chris Anker Sørensen
World Road Race, Peter Sagan

2016

Poland Time Trial, Maciej Bodnar
England Road Race, Adam Blythe
Poland Road Race, Rafał Majka
Czech Road Race, Roman Kreuziger
Slovak Road Race, Juraj Sagan
European Road Race, Peter Sagan
World Road Race, Peter Sagan

== Staff ==
=== Sports directors ===
Name	Born	Nationality	Previous	Enter
Fabrizio Guidi	1972	Italy	Road bicycle racer	2011
Tristan Hoffman	1970	Netherlands	Rider for Team CSC Saxo Bank	2011
