= Herning CK =

Herning Cykle Klub (or Herning CK), founded in 1937, is an amateur road bicycle racing club, located in Herning, Denmark.

A number of the best Danish professional riders, including 1996 Tour de France winner Bjarne Riis, come from Herning CK, and the professional UCI ProTour team Team CSC was created from the elite team of Herning CK.
