= Home a/s =

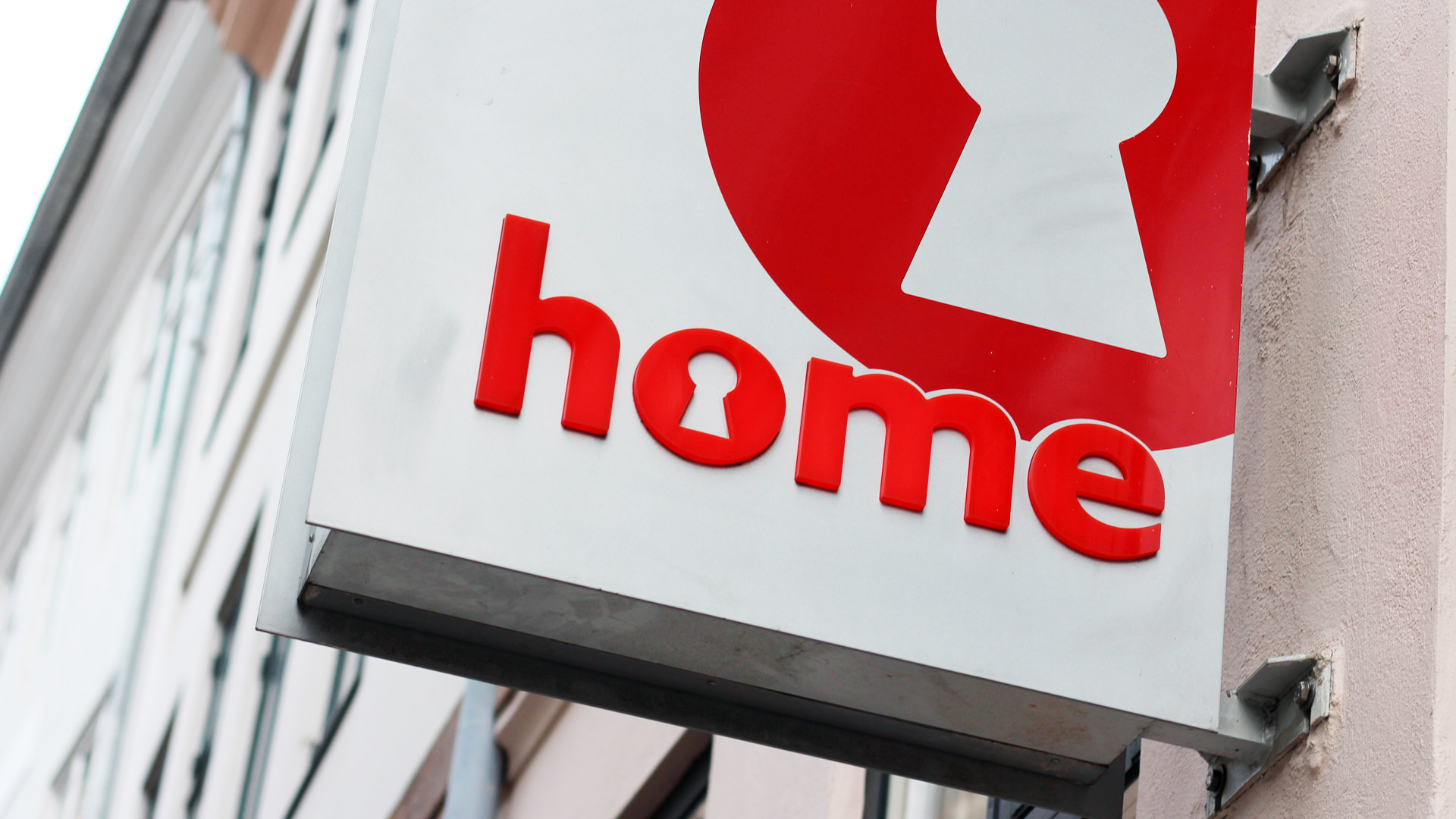
Home a/s' current logo since August 1, 1989. The Home a/s logo can be seen on a signage at a Home a/s estate agency in Copenhagen, Denmark. (The photo is taken by Martin Jordan.)

home a/s is a Danish chain of real estate agencies, wholly owned by Danske Bank, the largest bank in Denmark. The chain was established on August 1, 1989, and as of 2005, it has approximately a quarter of the Danish real estate market.

From 1998 to 1999 the chain was co-sponsoring a professional road bicycle racing team, named Team home - Jack & Jones, together with the clothes brand Jack & Jones.
