= Sommersted =

- Town
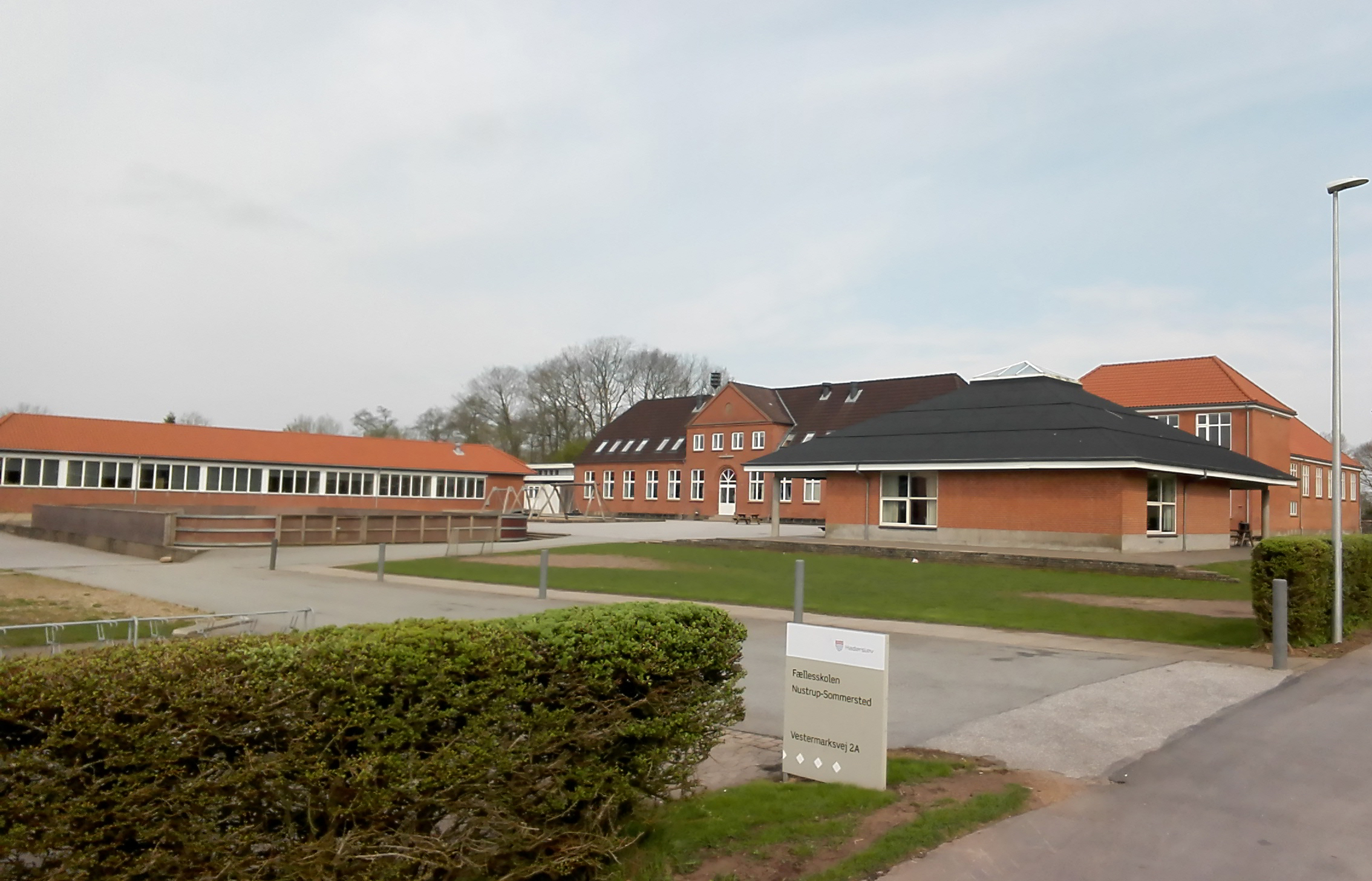
- Sommersted School - the Sommersted department of the Nustrup-Sommersted school community

- Location within Denmark Location within Region of Southern Denmark
- Coordinates: 55°18′47″N 9°17′12″E
- Country: Denmark
- Region: Southern Denmark
- Municipality: Haderslev Municipality

Area
  - Urban: 1 km^{2} (0.39 sq mi)

Population (2026)
  - Urban: 990
  - Urban density: 990/km^{2} (2,600/sq mi)
- Time zone: UTC+1 (CET)
  - Summer (DST): UTC+2 (CEST)
- Postal code: DK-6560 Sommersted

Sommersted (German: Sommerstedt) is a small town, with a population of 990 (1 January 2026), in Haderslev Municipality, Region of Southern Denmark in Denmark. It is located 11 km north of Vojens, 17 km south of Vamdrup, 38 km east of Ribe and 17 km northwest of Haderslev.

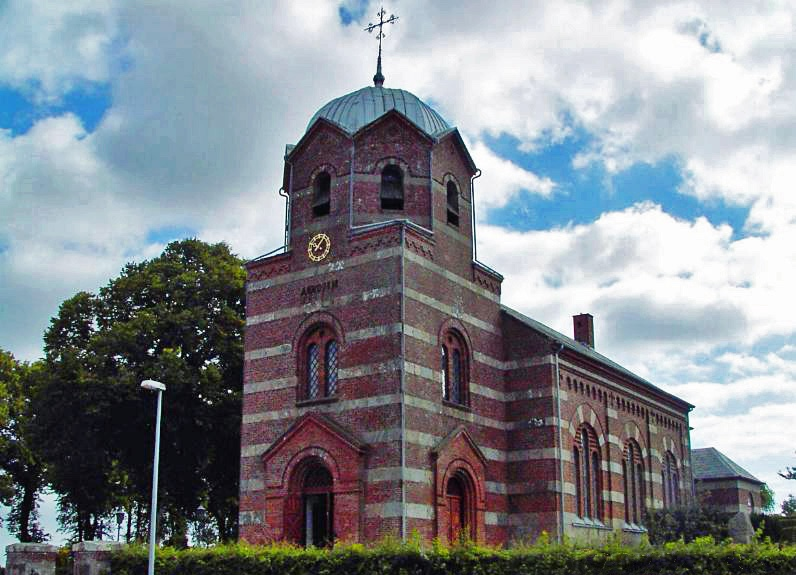
Sommersted Church

Sommersted Church, built in 1857–58 in a very unusual almost neo-Romanesque style, is located to the northeast in the old part of the elongated town.

Sommersted Mose is a small bog located on the northern outskirts of the town. The bog was used for digging peat during the war and is now an excursion spot for the town's citizens.
