= Over Jerstal =

Over Jerstal Ober Jersdal (German)
- Town
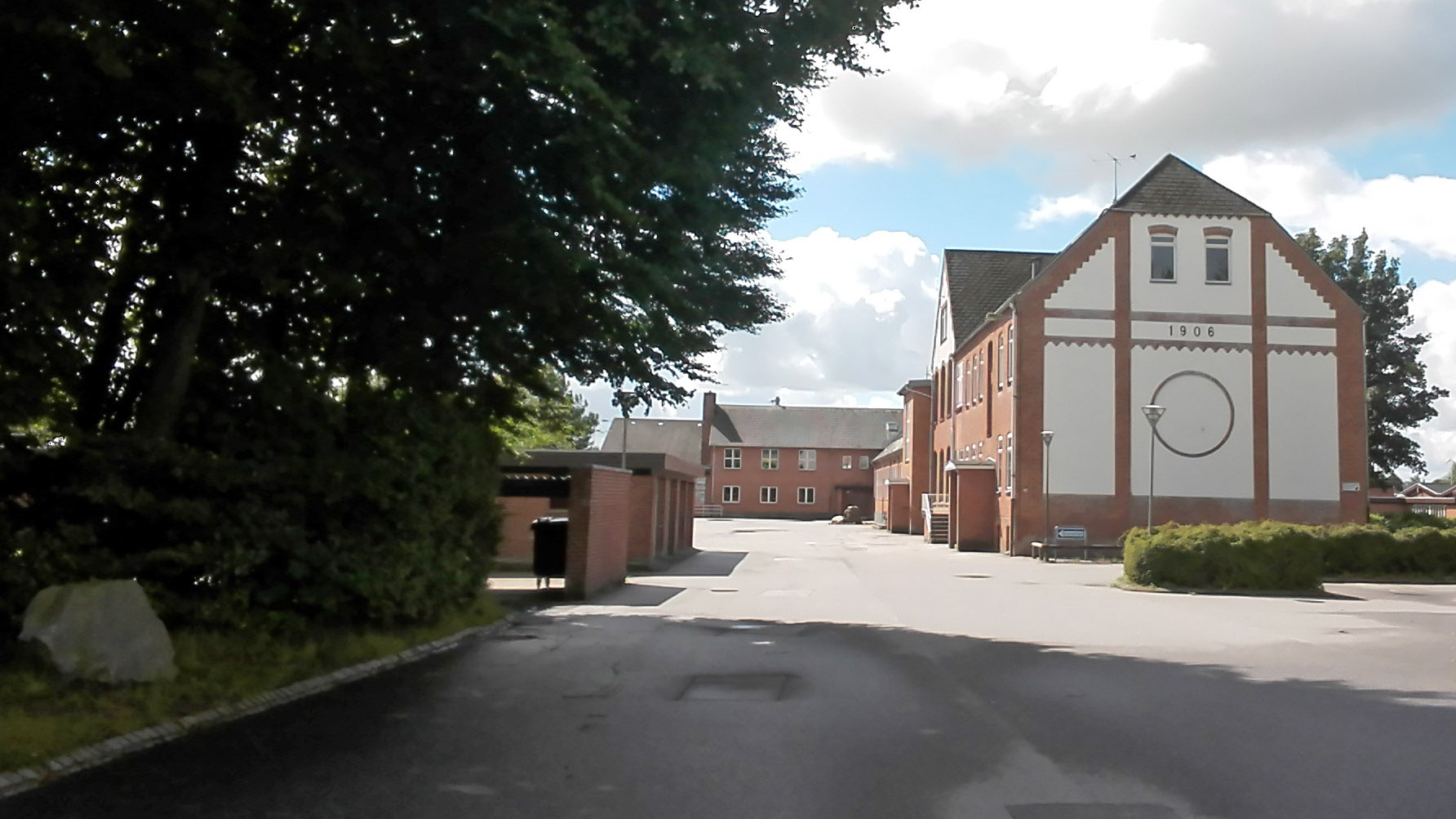
- Over Jerstal School

- Location within Denmark Location within Region of Southern Denmark
- Coordinates: 55°11′52″N 9°18′15″E
- Country: Denmark
- Region: Southern Denmark
- Municipality: Haderslev Municipality

Area
  - Urban: 0.9 km^{2} (0.35 sq mi)

Population (2026)
  - Urban: 1,071
  - Urban density: 1,200/km^{2} (3,100/sq mi)
- Time zone: UTC+1 (CET)
  - Summer (DST): UTC+2 (CEST)
- Postal code: DK-6500 Vojens

Over Jerstal (German: Ober Jersdal) is a small town, with a population of 1,071 (1 January 2026), in Haderslev Municipality, Region of Southern Denmark in Denmark. It is located 22 km northwest of Aabenraa, 7 km south of Vojens and 17 km southwest of Haderslev.

A collection of passage graves from the Neolithic and Bronze Age, approx. 3300 B.C, are located 1 km north of the town.
