= Marstrup =

- Town
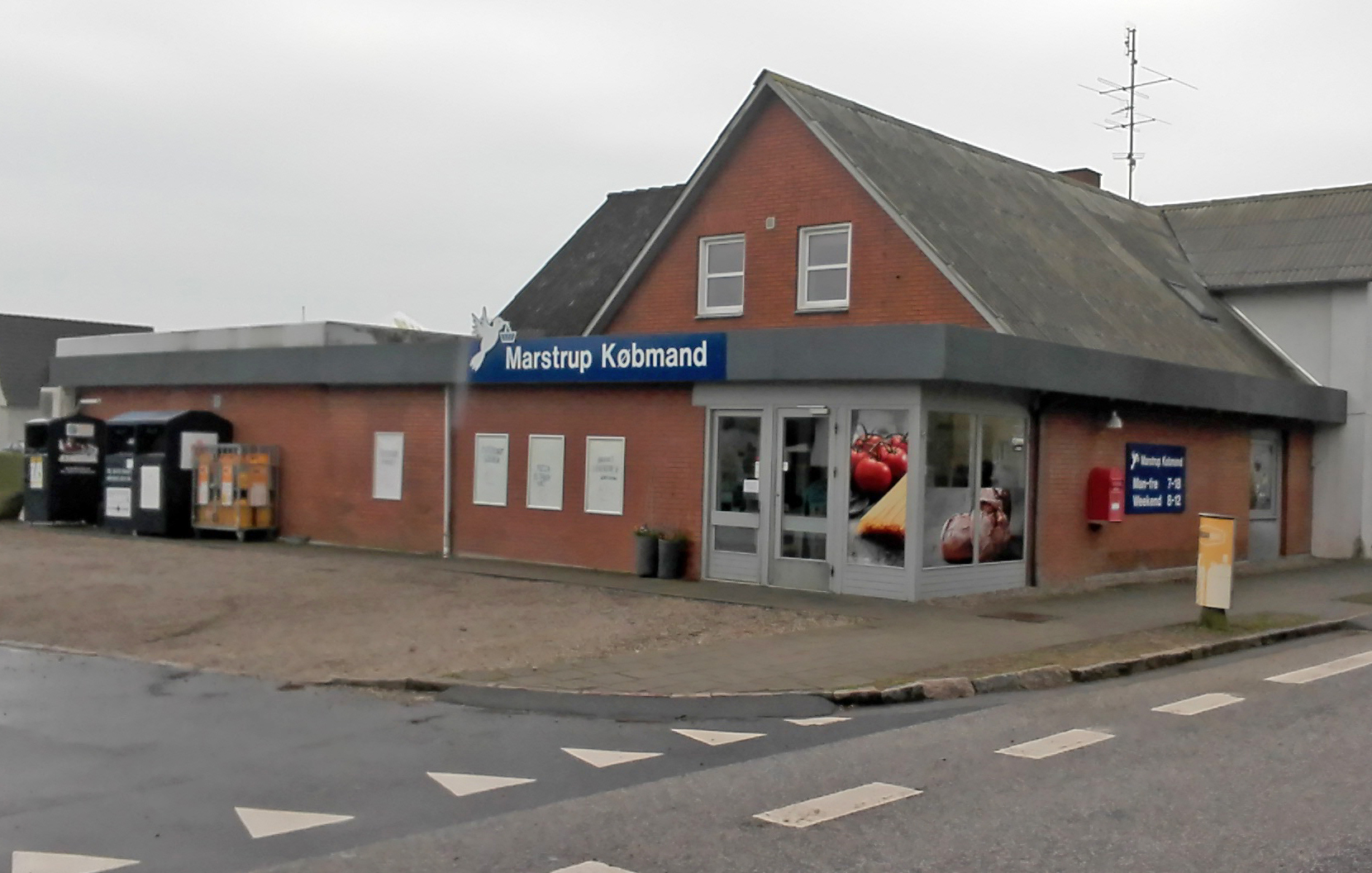
- A grocery store in Marstrup

- Location within Region of Southern Denmark
- Coordinates: 55°12′32″N 9°26′31″E
- Country: Denmark
- Region: Southern Denmark (Syddanmark)
- Municipality: Haderslev

Population (2026)
  - Urban: 778

Marstrup (German: Mastrup) is a town in southeastern Jutland in the Haderslev Municipality, in Region of Southern Denmark. As of 1 January 2026, it has a population of 778.

== Notable residents ==
- Rasmus Byriel Iversen (born 1997), Danish cyclist
- Lene Christensen (born 2000), Danish football goalkeeper for the Danish national team.
