= Hammelev =

- Town
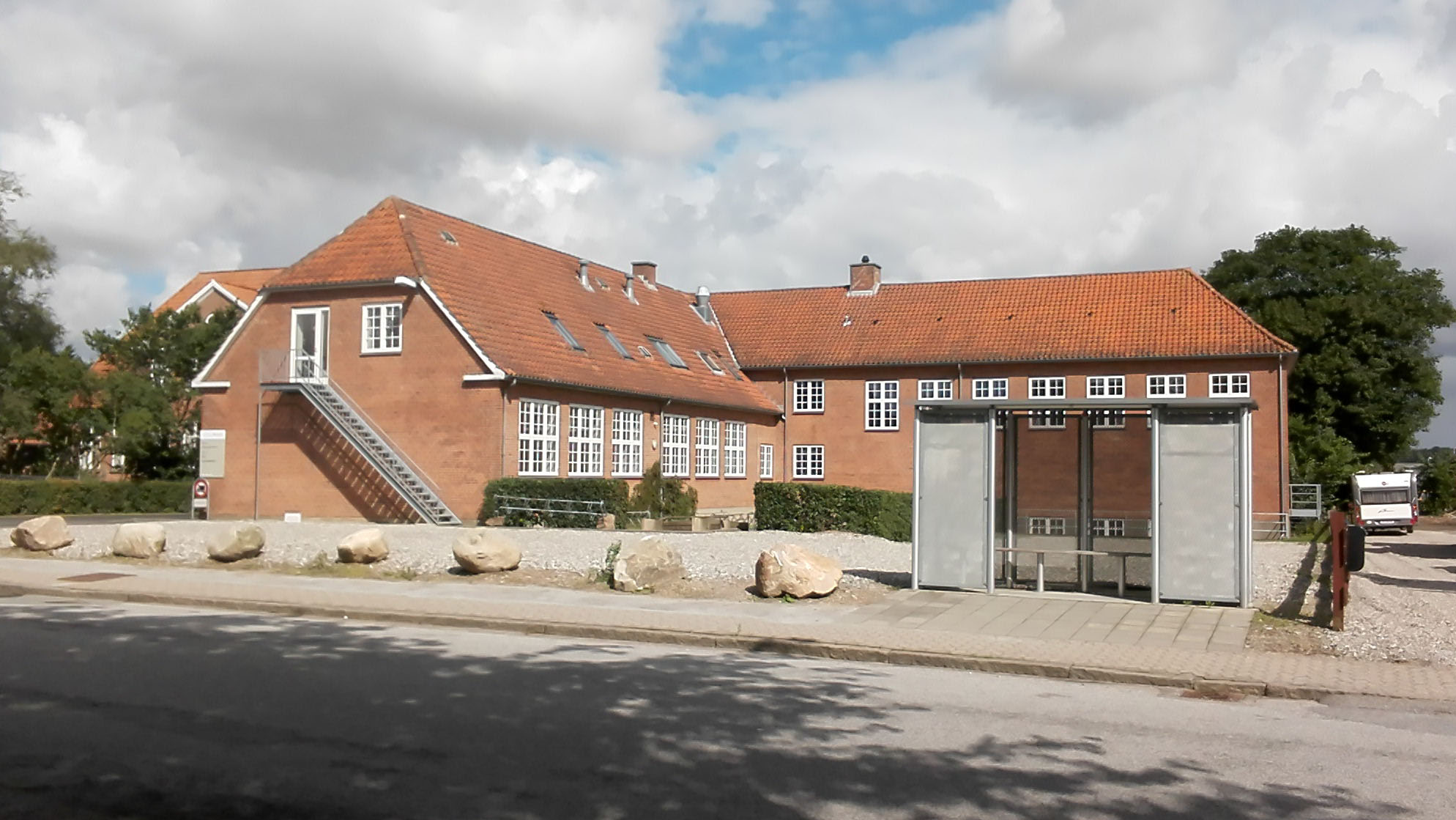
- Hammelev School

- Location within Denmark Location within Region of Southern Denmark
- Coordinates: 55°14′44″N 9°22′44″E
- Country: Denmark
- Region: Southern Denmark
- Municipality: Haderslev Municipality

Area
  - Urban: 1.3 km^{2} (0.50 sq mi)

Population (2026)
  - Urban: 1,092
  - Urban density: 840/km^{2} (2,200/sq mi)
- Time zone: UTC+1 (CET)
  - Summer (DST): UTC+2 (CEST)
- Postal code: DK-6500 Vojens

Hammelev is a small town, with a population of 1,092 (1 January 2026), in Haderslev Municipality, Region of Southern Denmark in Denmark. It is located just west of exit 68 Vojens at the European route E45 motorway, 7 km east of Vojens and 7 km west of Haderslev.

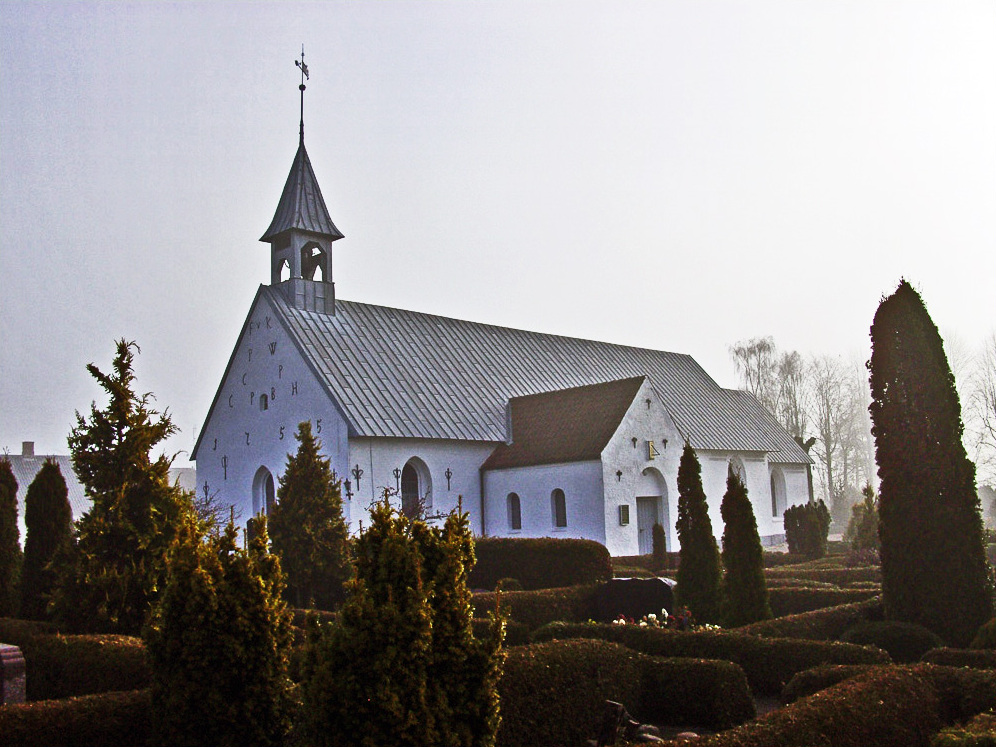
Hammelev Church

Hammelev Church is located in the town.

== Business park ==
Hammelev Business Park (Hammelev Erhvervs Park) is located in the northeasthern part of the town with close proximity and easy access to the motorway.

Danitech and Bema A/S were two of the first companies to be established in the business park.
