= Starup =

- Town
- Location within Region of Southern Denmark Location within Denmark
- Coordinates: 55°14′24″N 9°32′20″E
- Country: Denmark
- Region: Southern Denmark
- Municipality: Haderslev Municipality
- Parish: Sønder Starup Parish

Area
  - Urban: 1.6 km^{2} (0.62 sq mi)

Population (2026)
  - Urban: 2,600
  - Urban density: 1,600/km^{2} (4,200/sq mi)
- Time zone: UTC+1 (CET)
  - Summer (DST): UTC+2 (CEST)
- Postal code: DK-6100 Haderslev

Starup (German: Starup) is a town and satellite community to Haderslev, with a population of 2,600 (1 January 2026), on the southern side of the narrow inlet of Haderslev Fjord. It is located 3 km east of Haderslev in Haderslev Municipality, Region of Southern Denmark in Denmark.

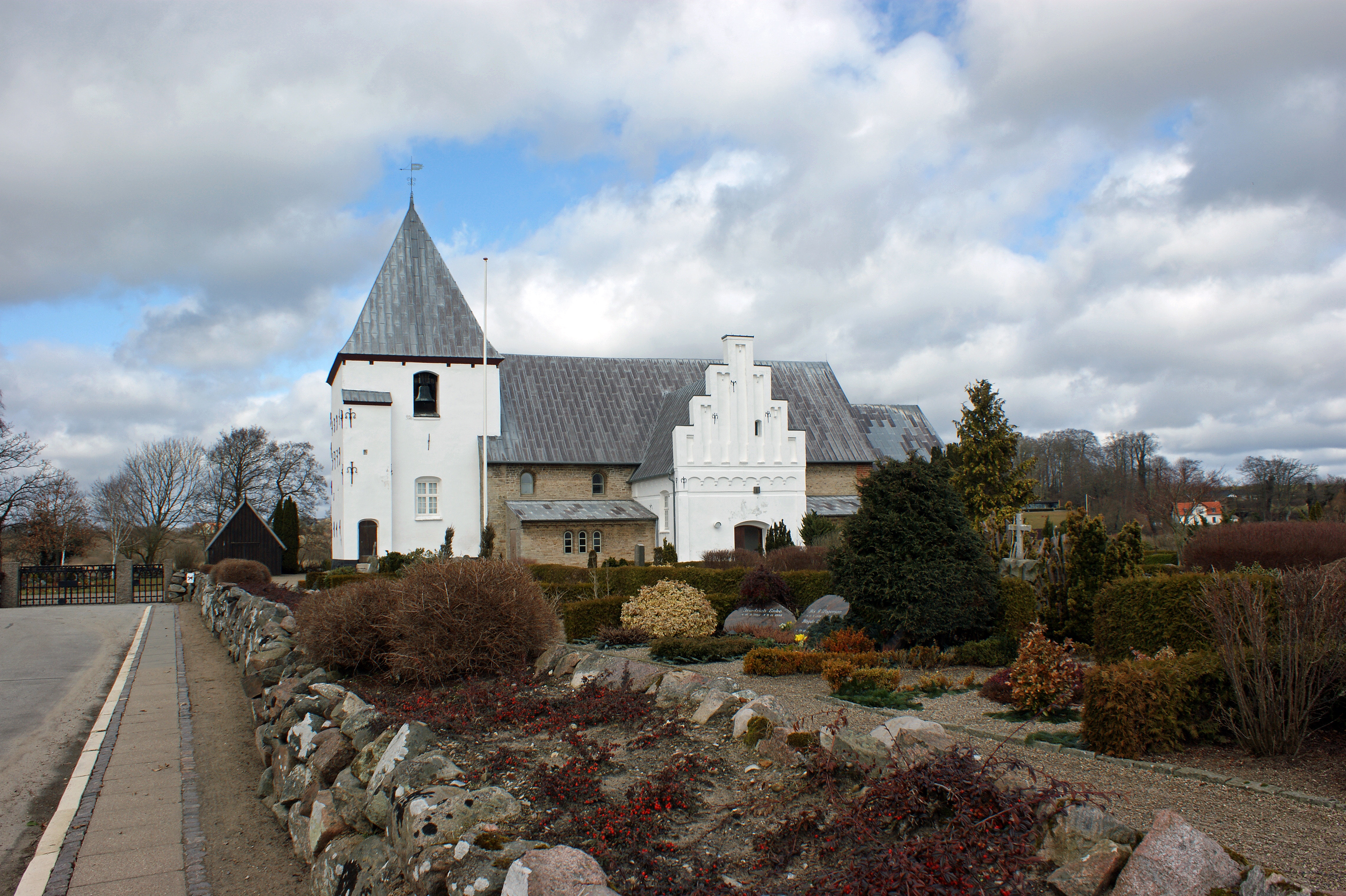
Sønder Starup Church in Starup

Sønder Starup Church is located on the northern outskirts of the town at the shore of Haderslev Fjord.
