= Haderslev Municipality =

Haderslev Municipality Haderslev Kommune (Danish) Kommune Hadersleben (German)
- Municipality
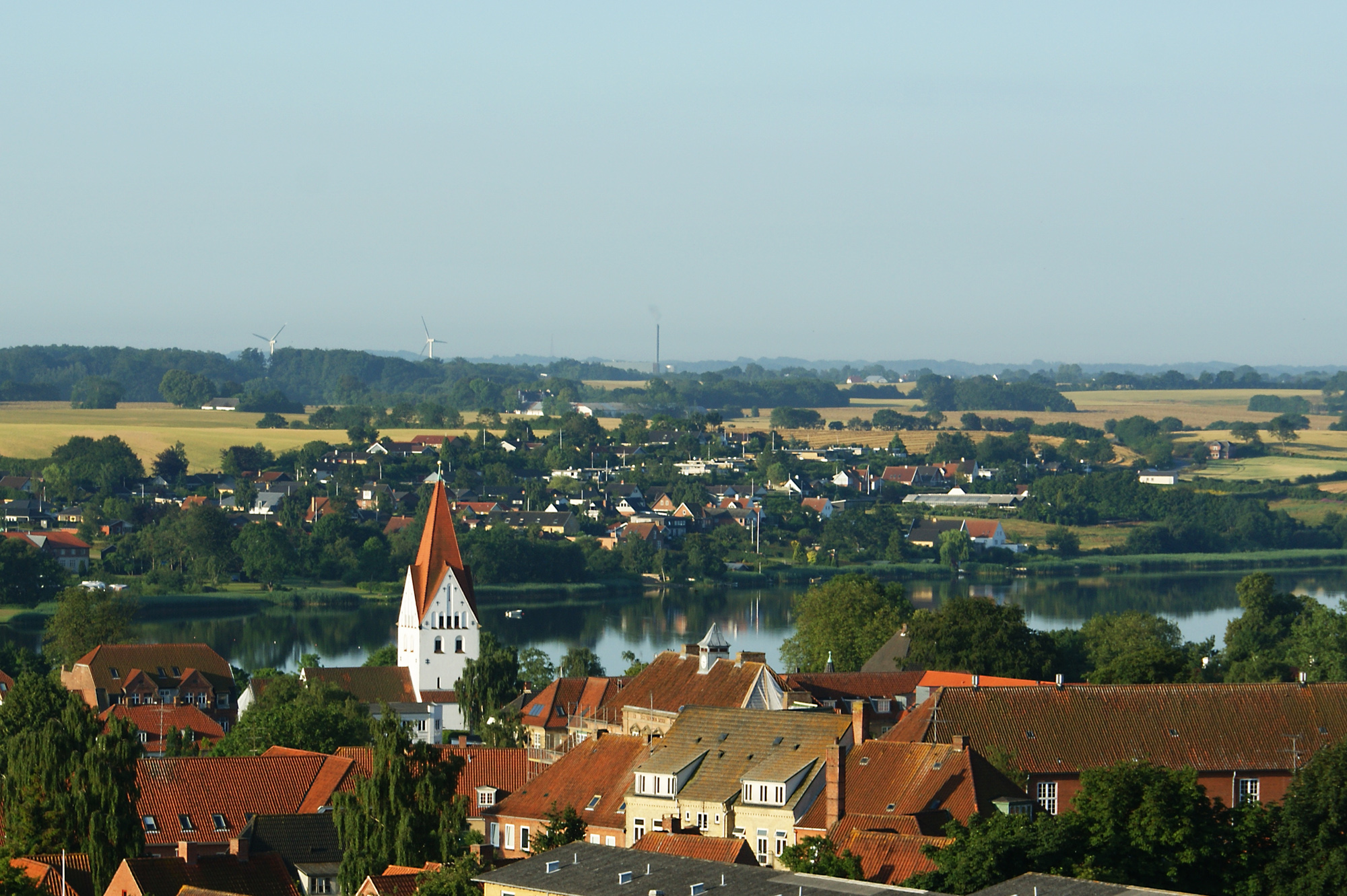

- Coat of arms

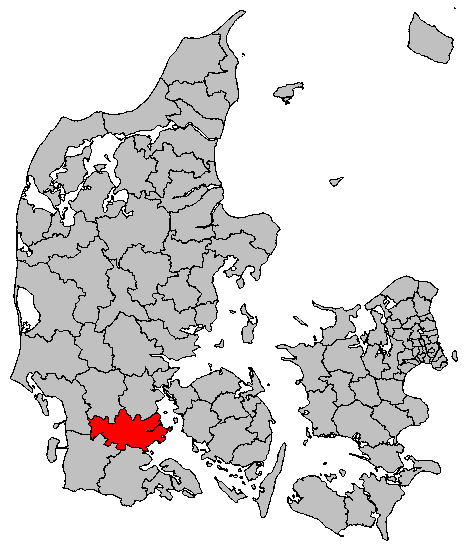
- Location in Denmark
- Coordinates: 55°15′N 9°30′E
- Country: Denmark
- Region: Southern Denmark
- Established: 1 January 2007

Government
  - Mayor: Mads Skau

Area
  - Total: 814 km^{2} (314 sq mi)

Population (1 January 2026)
  - Total: 55,218
  - Density: 67.8/km^{2} (176/sq mi)
- Time zone: UTC+1 (CET)
  - Summer (DST): UTC+2 (CEST)
- Postal code: 6100
- Area code: 7
- Website: www.haderslev.dk

Haderslev Municipality (Danish: Haderslev Kommune, German: Kommune Hadersleben) is a town and municipality on the east coast of the Jutland peninsula in the Region of Southern Denmark. It includes the island of Årø as well as several other smaller islands in the Little Belt. The municipality covers 701.98 km^{2} (271 sq mi) and has a population of 55,218 (2026). Its mayor is Mads Skau, representing the Venstre political party. Following the Kommunalreformen ("The Municipal Reform" of 2007), Haderslev municipality was merged on 1 January that year with the former municipalities of Gram and Vojens, as well as Bjerning, Hjerndrup, and Fjelstrup parishes of Christiansfeld Municipality and Bevtoft parish of Nørre Rangstrup Municipality.

The municipality is part of Triangle Region and of the East Jutland metropolitan area, which had a total population of 1.378 million in 2016.

The waters of Haderslev Fjord cut into the municipality from the Little Belt, dividing the city north-to-south, becoming Haderslev Dam west of the city centre. Årø Strait (Årøsund) separates the bulk of the municipality from the island of Årø, and the two are connected by ferry service between the town of Årøsund on the mainland and the town of Årø on the island.

== Locations ==
Haderslev	21,994
Vojens	7,579
Gram	2,526
Starup	2,486
Over Jerstal	1,103
Sommersted	1,073
Hammelev	1,013
Marstrup	779
Bevtoft	749
Hoptrup	685

=== The city of Haderslev ===
The main town and the site of the municipal council is the city of Haderslev.

== North Schleswig Germans ==
Haderslev Municipality is home to the only officially recognised ethno-linguistic minority of Denmark proper, the North Schleswig Germans. This minority makes up about 6% of the total population of the municipalities of Aabenraa/Apenrade, Haderslev/Hadersleben, Sønderborg/Sonderburg and Tønder/Tondern. In these four municipalities, the German minority enjoys certain linguistic rights in accordance with the European Charter for Regional or Minority Languages.

== Politics ==
Haderslev's municipal council consists of 31 members, elected every four years. The municipal council has 11 political committees.

=== Municipal council ===
Below are the municipal councils elected since the Municipal Reform of 2007.

Election	Party											Total seats	Turnout	Elected mayor
Election	A	B	C	D	F	I	K	O	S	V	Ø	Total seats	Turnout	Elected mayor
2005	13		1		1		1	2		13		31	73.3%	Hans Peter Geil (V)
2009	14		1		2			2	1	11		31	69.6%	Jens Christian Gjesing (A)
2013	9	2	1			1		4	1	11	2	31	74.1%	Hans Peter Geil (V)
2017	10	1	1		1	2		4	1	9	2	31	73.4%	Hans Peter Geil (V)
2021	10	1	5	2	1			1	1	9	1	31	68.3%	Mads Skau (V)
Data from Kmdvalg.dk 2005, 2009, 2013, 2017 and 2021

== Notable people ==
- Ole Olsen (born 1946), three-time speedway world champion
- Günter Weitling (born 1935), Lutheran theologian, historian, and author

== Twin towns – sister cities ==
Haderslev is twinned with:

- Braine, France
- Sandefjord, Norway
- Uusikaupunki, Finland
- Varberg, Sweden
- Wittenberg, Germany
- Dunavarsány, Hungary

== Sources ==
- Municipal statistics: NetBorger Kommunefakta, delivered from KMD aka Kommunedata (Municipal Data)
- Municipal mergers and neighbours: Eniro new municipalities map
