= List of accolades received by The Danish Girl (film) =

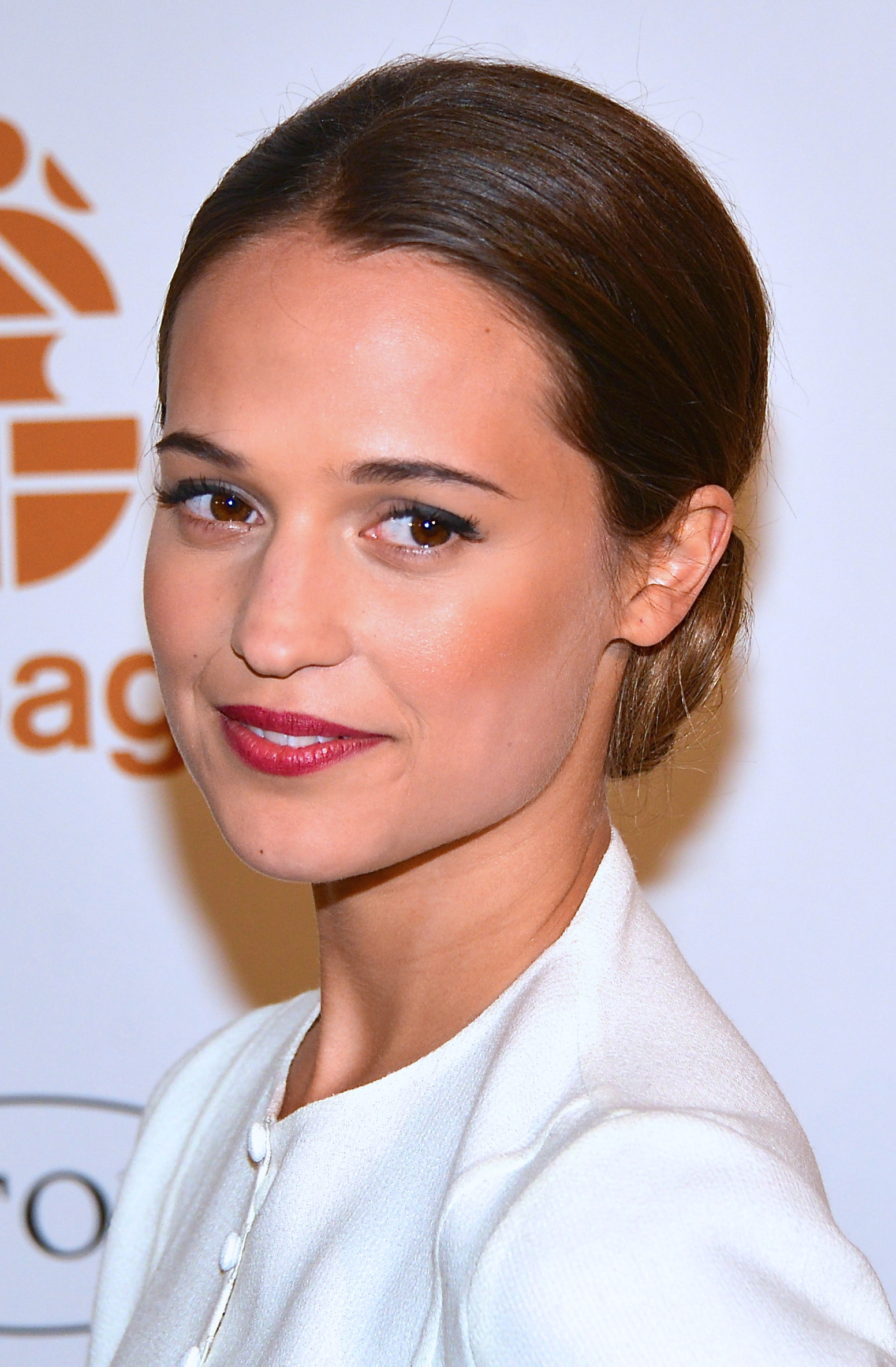
- Alicia Vikander received several awards and nominations for her performance in the film.
Accolades
Award	Won	Nominated
AACTA Awards	0	2
Academy Awards	1	4
Alliance of Women Film Journalists	2	3
Art Directors Guild	0	1
British Academy Film Awards	0	5
British Independent Film Awards	0	1
Casting Society of America	0	1
Chicago Film Critics Association	0	1
Costume Designers Guild	1	1
Critics' Choice Movie Awards	1	5
Dallas–Fort Worth Film Critics Association	0	2
Detroit Film Critics Society	2	2
Dorian Awards	0	3
Empire Awards	1	2
Florida Film Critics Circle	0	2
Golden Globes Awards	0	3
GLAAD Media Award	0	1
Hollywood Film Awards	2	2
Houston Film Critics Society	0	1
New York Film Critics Online	1	1
Online Film Critics Society	0	1
Palm Springs International Film Festival	1	1
San Diego Film Critics Society	1	3
San Francisco Film Critics Circle	0	1
Satellite Awards	1	7
Screen Actors Guild Awards	1	2
St. Louis Gateway Film Critics Association	0	3
Teen Choice Awards	0	1
Vancouver Film Critics Circle	0	2
Venice International Film Festival	1	1
Washington D.C. Area Film Critics Association	0	2
Women Film Critics Circle	2	2
- Total number of awards and nominations
Totals	20	72
- References

The Danish Girl is a 2015 British-American biographical romantic drama film directed by Tom Hooper. It is an adaptation of the 2000 fictional novel of the same name by David Ebershoff, which was loosely based on the life of Danish painter Lili Elbe, one of the earliest recipients of gender reassignment surgery. Eddie Redmayne stars as Elbe, Alicia Vikander plays Danish painter Gerda Wegener, with Matthias Schoenaerts, and Ben Whishaw featuring in supporting roles. The film premiered at the 72nd Venice International Film Festival on 5 September 2015, where it received the Queer Lion. Focus Features initially provided the film a limited release at four theaters on 27 November 2015 before expanding to over 700 theaters in the United States and Canada on 22 January 2016. The Danish Girl grossed a worldwide box office total of over $64 million on a production budget of $15 million. Rotten Tomatoes, a review aggregator surveyed 237 reviews and judged 68 percent to be positive.

The Danish Girl gained awards and nominations in a variety of categories with particular praise for the performances of Vikander and Redmayne. The film received four nominations at the 88th Academy Awards with Vikander winning the Academy Award for Best Supporting Actress. At the 69th British Academy Film Awards, it gained five nominations including Best British Film, Best Actor for Redmayne, and Best Actress for Vikander. Both Redmayne and Vikander were nominated at the 73rd Golden Globe Awards. Vikander also received a Screen Actors Guild Award for her performance.

At the 21st Critics' Choice Awards, the film gained five nominations with Vikander winning for Best Supporting Actress. It received seven nominations at the 20th Satellite Awards including Best Director for Hooper, Best Actor for Redmayne, and Vikander won for Best Supporting Actress. She also received the Empire Award for Best Actress, and the Palm Springs International Film Festival's Rising Star Award.

== Accolades ==
Award	Date of ceremony	Category	Recipient(s)	Result	Ref(s)
AACTA Awards	9 December 2015	Best Actor – International	Eddie Redmayne	Nominated	
AACTA Awards	9 December 2015	Best Supporting Actress – International	Alicia Vikander	Nominated	
Academy Awards	28 February 2016	Best Actor	Eddie Redmayne	Nominated	
Academy Awards	28 February 2016	Best Supporting Actress	Alicia Vikander	Won	
Academy Awards	28 February 2016	Best Costume Design	Paco Delgado	Nominated	
Academy Awards	28 February 2016	Best Production Design	Production Design: Eve Stewart; Set Decoration: Michael Standish	Nominated	
Alliance of Women Film Journalists	13 January 2016	Best Actor	Eddie Redmayne	Nominated	
Alliance of Women Film Journalists	13 January 2016	Best Breakthrough Performance	Alicia Vikander	Won (Note: Also for Ex Machina and Testament of Youth)	
Alliance of Women Film Journalists	13 January 2016	Movie You Wanted To Love, But Just Couldn't	The Danish Girl	Won	
Apolo Awards	13 January 2017	Best Production Design	Eve Stewart and Michael Standish	Nominated	
Apolo Awards	13 January 2017	Best Costuming	Paco Delgado	Won	
Apolo Awards	13 January 2017	Best Hair and Make-Up	Jan Sewell	Won	
Apolo Awards	13 January 2017	Best Original Music	Alexandre Desplat	Nominated	
Apolo Awards	13 January 2017	Best Actress	Alicia Vikander	Nominated	
Art Directors Guild	31 January 2016	Excellence in Production Design for a Period Film	Eve Stewart	Nominated	
BAFTA Awards	14 February 2016	Best British Film	The Danish Girl	Nominated	
BAFTA Awards	14 February 2016	Best Actor	Eddie Redmayne	Nominated	
BAFTA Awards	14 February 2016	Best Actress	Alicia Vikander	Nominated	
BAFTA Awards	14 February 2016	Best Costume Design	Paco Delgado	Nominated	
BAFTA Awards	14 February 2016	Best Makeup and Hair	Jan Sewell	Nominated	
British Independent Film Awards	6 December 2015	Best Actress	Alicia Vikander	Nominated	
Casting Society of America	21 January 2016	Feature Film Studio or Independent Drama	Nina Gold	Nominated	
Chicago Film Critics Association	16 December 2015	Best Actor	Eddie Redmayne	Nominated	
Costume Designers Guild	23 February 2016	Excellence in Period Film	Paco Delgado	Won	
Critics' Choice Movie Awards	17 January 2016	Best Actor	Eddie Redmayne	Nominated	
Critics' Choice Movie Awards	17 January 2016	Best Supporting Actress	Alicia Vikander	Won	
Critics' Choice Movie Awards	17 January 2016	Best Production Design	Eve Stewart, and Michael Standish	Nominated	
Critics' Choice Movie Awards	17 January 2016	Best Costume Design	Paco Delgado	Nominated	
Critics' Choice Movie Awards	17 January 2016	Best Hair and Makeup	The Danish Girl	Nominated	
Dallas–Fort Worth Film Critics Association	14 December 2015	Best Actor	Eddie Redmayne	3rd Place	
Dallas–Fort Worth Film Critics Association	14 December 2015	Best Supporting Actress	Alicia Vikander	4th Place	
Detroit Film Critics Society	14 December 2015	Best Supporting Actress	Alicia Vikander	Won	
Detroit Film Critics Society	14 December 2015	Best Breakthrough	Alicia Vikander	Won (Note: Also for Ex Machina)	
Dorian Awards	19 January 2016	Performance of the Year – Actor	Eddie Redmayne	Nominated	
Dorian Awards	19 January 2016	LGBTQ Film of the Year	The Danish Girl	Nominated	
Dorian Awards	19 January 2016	Visually Striking Film of the Year	The Danish Girl	Nominated	
Empire Awards	20 March 2016	Best Actress	Alicia Vikander	Won	
Empire Awards	20 March 2016	Best Makeup and Hairstyling	The Danish Girl	Nominated	
Florida Film Critics Circle	23 December 2015	Best Actor	Alicia Vikander	Nominated	
Florida Film Critics Circle	23 December 2015	Breakout Award	Alicia Vikander	Runner-up (Note: Also for Ex Machina)	
GLAAD Media Award	2 April 2016	Outstanding Film – Wide Release	The Danish Girl	Nominated	
Golden Globe Awards	10 January 2016	Best Actor in a Motion Picture – Drama	Eddie Redmayne	Nominated	
Golden Globe Awards	10 January 2016	Best Actress in a Motion Picture – Drama	Alicia Vikander	Nominated	
Golden Globe Awards	10 January 2016	Best Original Score	Alexandre Desplat	Nominated	
Hollywood Film Awards	1 November 2015	Hollywood Director Award	Tom Hooper	Won	
Hollywood Film Awards	1 November 2015	Hollywood Breakout Actress Award	Alicia Vikander	Won	
Houston Film Critics Society	9 January 2016	Best Supporting Actress	Alicia Vikander	Nominated	
New York Film Critics Online	6 December 2015	Best Breakthrough Performance	Alicia Vikander	Won (Note: Also for Ex Machina)	
Online Film Critics Society	13 December 2015	Best Supporting Actress	Alicia Vikander	Nominated	
Palm Springs International Film Festival	2 January 2016	Rising Star Award	Alicia Vikander	Won	
San Diego Film Critics Society	14 December 2015	Best Supporting Actress	Alicia Vikander	Nominated	
San Diego Film Critics Society	14 December 2015	Breakthrough Artist	Alicia Vikander	Runner-up	
San Diego Film Critics Society	14 December 2015	Best Body of Work	Alicia Vikander	Won (Note: Also for Ex Machina, The Man from U.N.C.L.E., and Burnt)	
San Francisco Film Critics Circle	13 December 2015	Best Supporting Actress	Alicia Vikander	Nominated	
Satellite Awards	21 February 2016	Best Director	Tom Hooper	Nominated	
Satellite Awards	21 February 2016	Best Actor	Eddie Redmayne	Nominated	
Satellite Awards	21 February 2016	Best Supporting Actress	Alicia Vikander	Won	
Satellite Awards	21 February 2016	Best Adapted Screenplay	Lucinda Coxon	Nominated	
Satellite Awards	21 February 2016	Best Original Score	Alexandre Desplat	Nominated	
Satellite Awards	21 February 2016	Best Art Direction and Production Design	Eve Stewart	Nominated	
Satellite Awards	21 February 2016	Best Costume Design	Paco Delgado	Nominated	
Screen Actors Guild Awards	30 January 2016	Outstanding Performance by a Male Actor in a Leading Role	Eddie Redmayne	Nominated	
Screen Actors Guild Awards	30 January 2016	Outstanding Performance by a Female Actor in a Supporting Role	Alicia Vikander	Won	
St. Louis Gateway Film Critics Association	21 December 2015	Best Actor	Eddie Redmayne	Nominated	
St. Louis Gateway Film Critics Association	21 December 2015	Best Actress	Alicia Vikander	Nominated	
St. Louis Gateway Film Critics Association	21 December 2015	Best Art Direction	The Danish Girl	Runner-up (Note: Tied with Brooklyn and Carol)	
Teen Choice Awards	31 July 2016	Choice Movie Actress: Drama	Alicia Vikander	Nominated	
Vancouver Film Critics Circle	21 December 2015	Best International Actor	Eddie Redmayne	Nominated	
Vancouver Film Critics Circle	21 December 2015	Best International Actress	Alicia Vikander	Nominated	
Venice International Film Festival	11 September 2015	Queer Lion	Tom Hooper	Won	
Washington D.C. Area Film Critics Association	7 December 2015	Best Actor	Eddie Redmayne	Nominated	
Washington D.C. Area Film Critics Association	7 December 2015	Best Supporting Actress	Alicia Vikander	Nominated	
Women Film Critics Circle	17 December 2015	Best Actor	Eddie Redmayne	Won	
Women Film Critics Circle	17 December 2015	The Invisible Woman Award	Alicia Vikander	Won	

== See also ==
- 2015 in film
