= 21st Critics' Choice Awards =

2016 US film awards

- Date: January 17, 2016
- Site: Barker Hangar, Santa Monica, California, United States
- Hosted by: T.J. Miller

Highlights
- Most awards: Film: Mad Max: Fury Road (9); Television: Fargo (4)
- Most nominations: Film: Mad Max: Fury Road (13); Television: Fargo (8)
- Best Picture: Spotlight
- Best Comedy Series: Master of None
- Best Drama Series: Mr. Robot
- Best Movie Made for Television or Limited Series: Fargo
- Best Animation Series: BoJack Horseman
- Website: www.criticschoice.com

Television/radio coverage
- Network: A&E / Lifetime / LMN

The 21st Critics' Choice Awards were presented on January 17, 2016, at the Barker Hangar at the Santa Monica Airport, honoring the finest achievements of filmmaking and television programming in 2015. The ceremony was simulcast on A&E, Lifetime and LMN, and hosted by T.J. Miller. The nominees were announced on December 14, 2015.

This year marked the first time the awards were combined with the Critics' Choice Television Awards into one event onward.

== Winners and nominees ==
=== Film ===
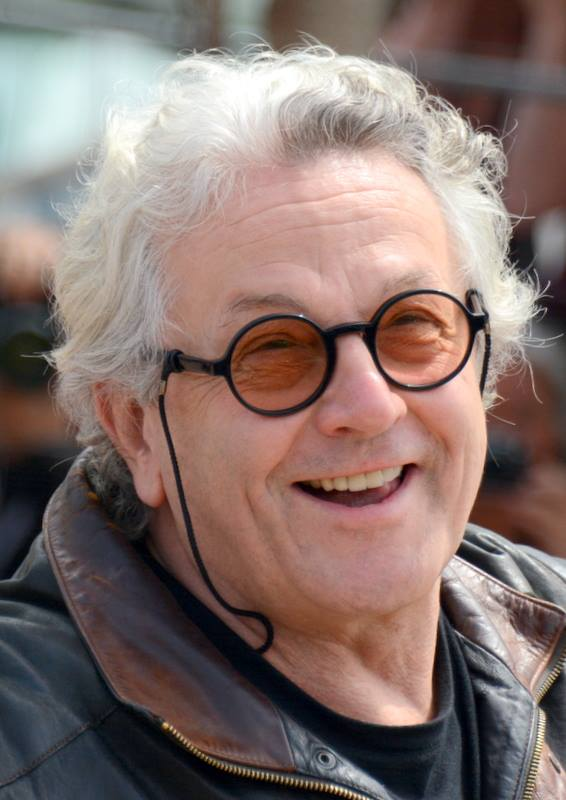
George Miller, Best Director winner

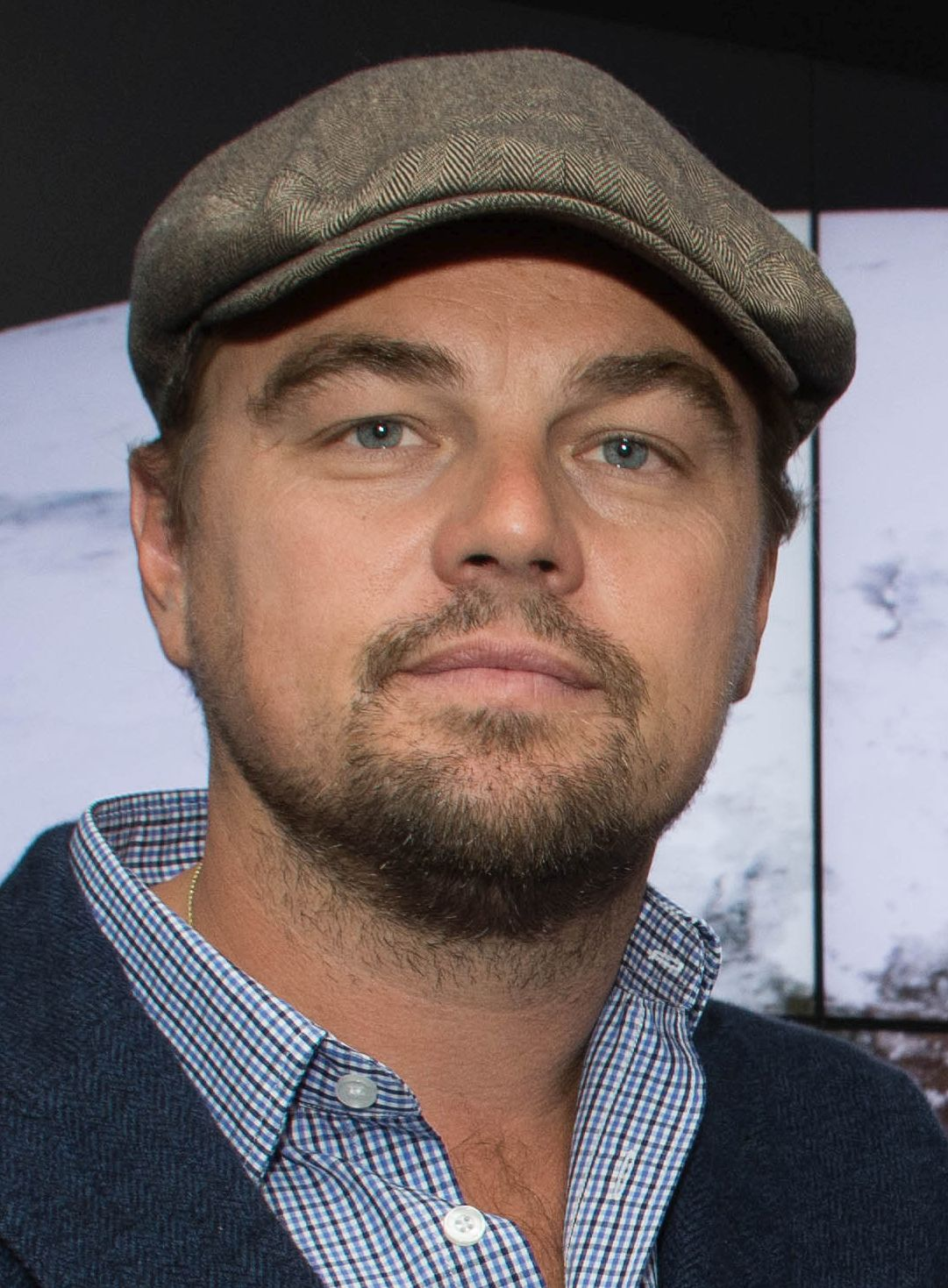
Leonardo DiCaprio, Best Actor winner

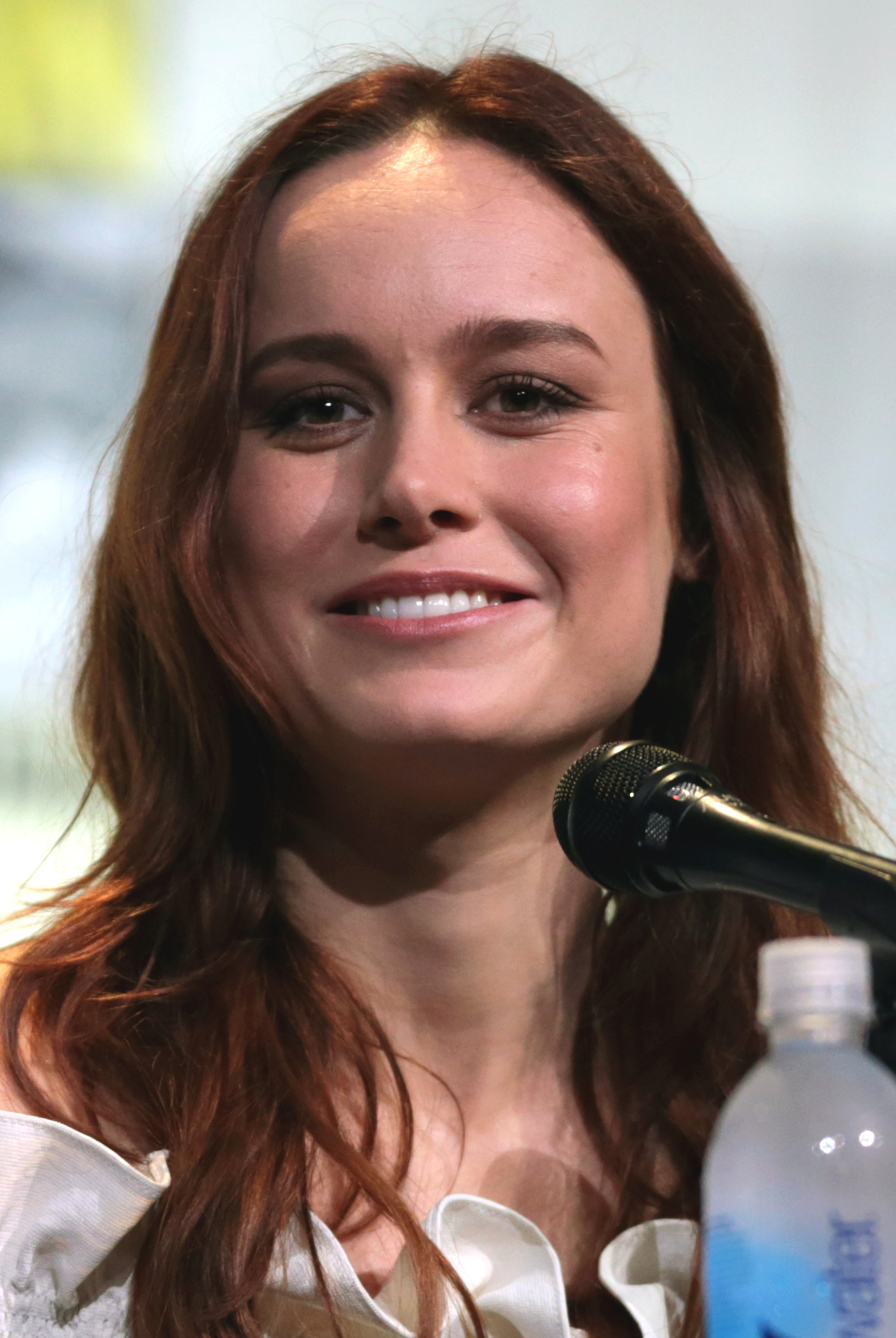
Brie Larson, Best Actress winner

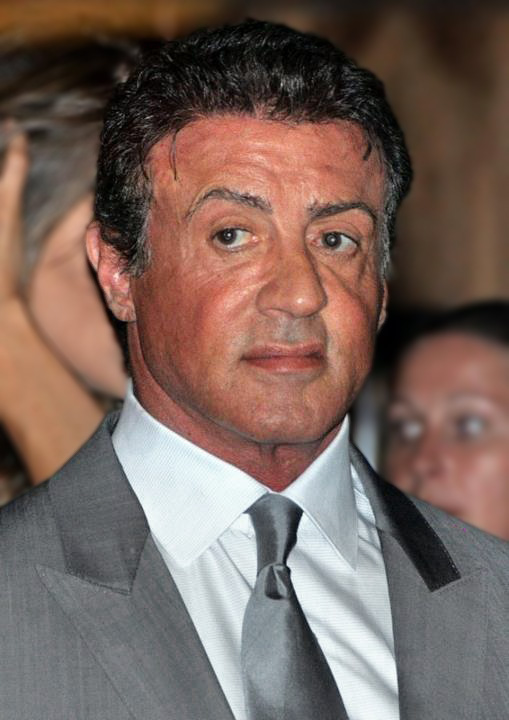
Sylvester Stallone, Best Supporting Actor winner

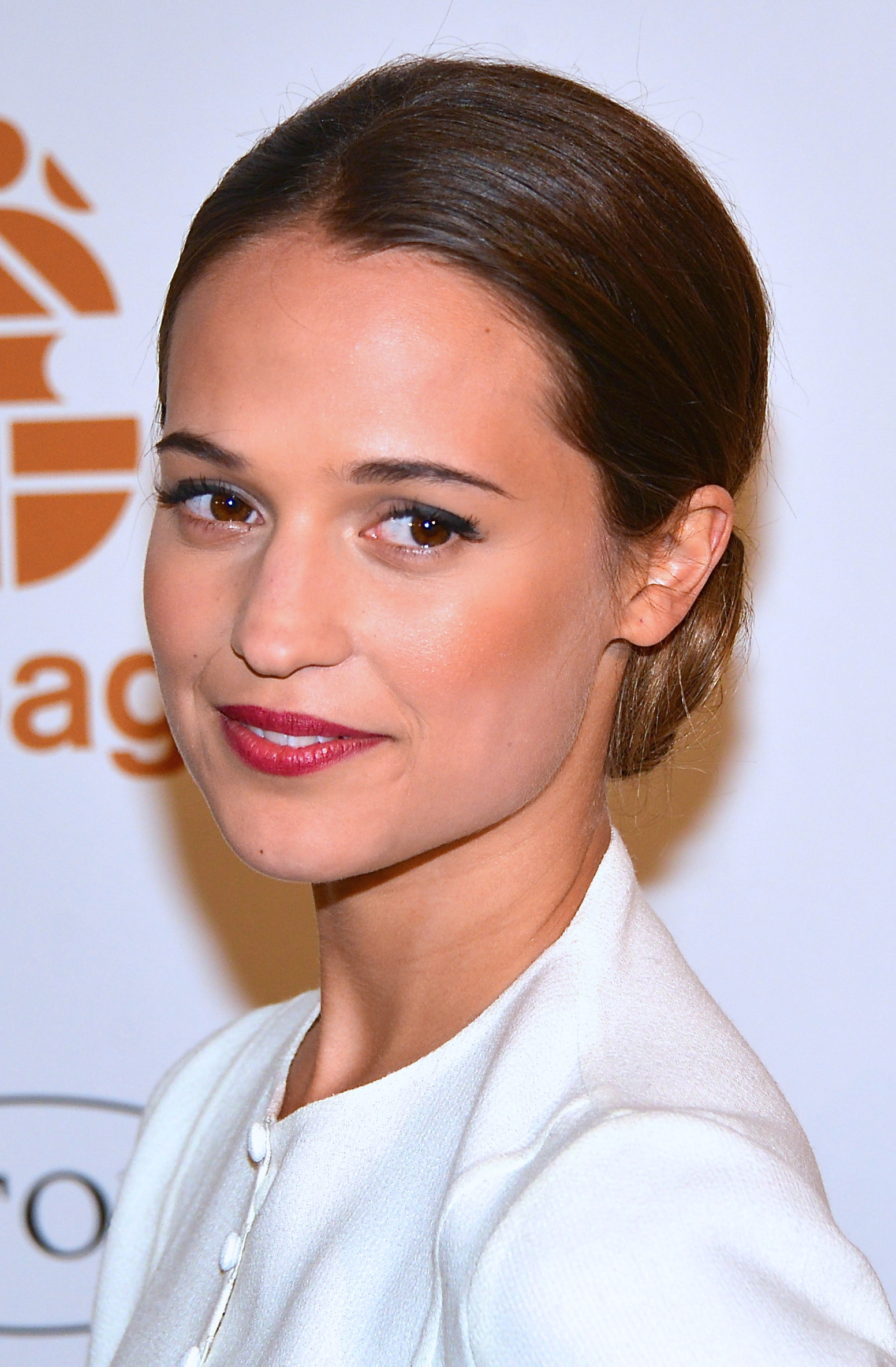
Alicia Vikander, Best Supporting Actress winner

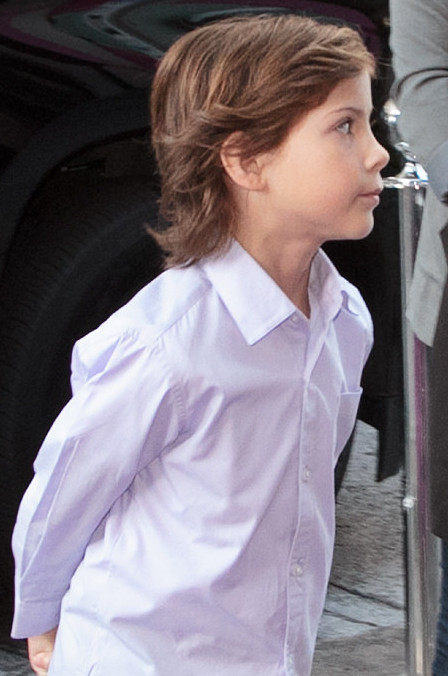
Jacob Tremblay, Best Young Actor/Actress winner

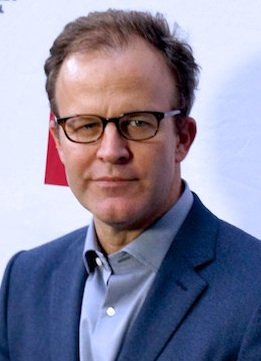
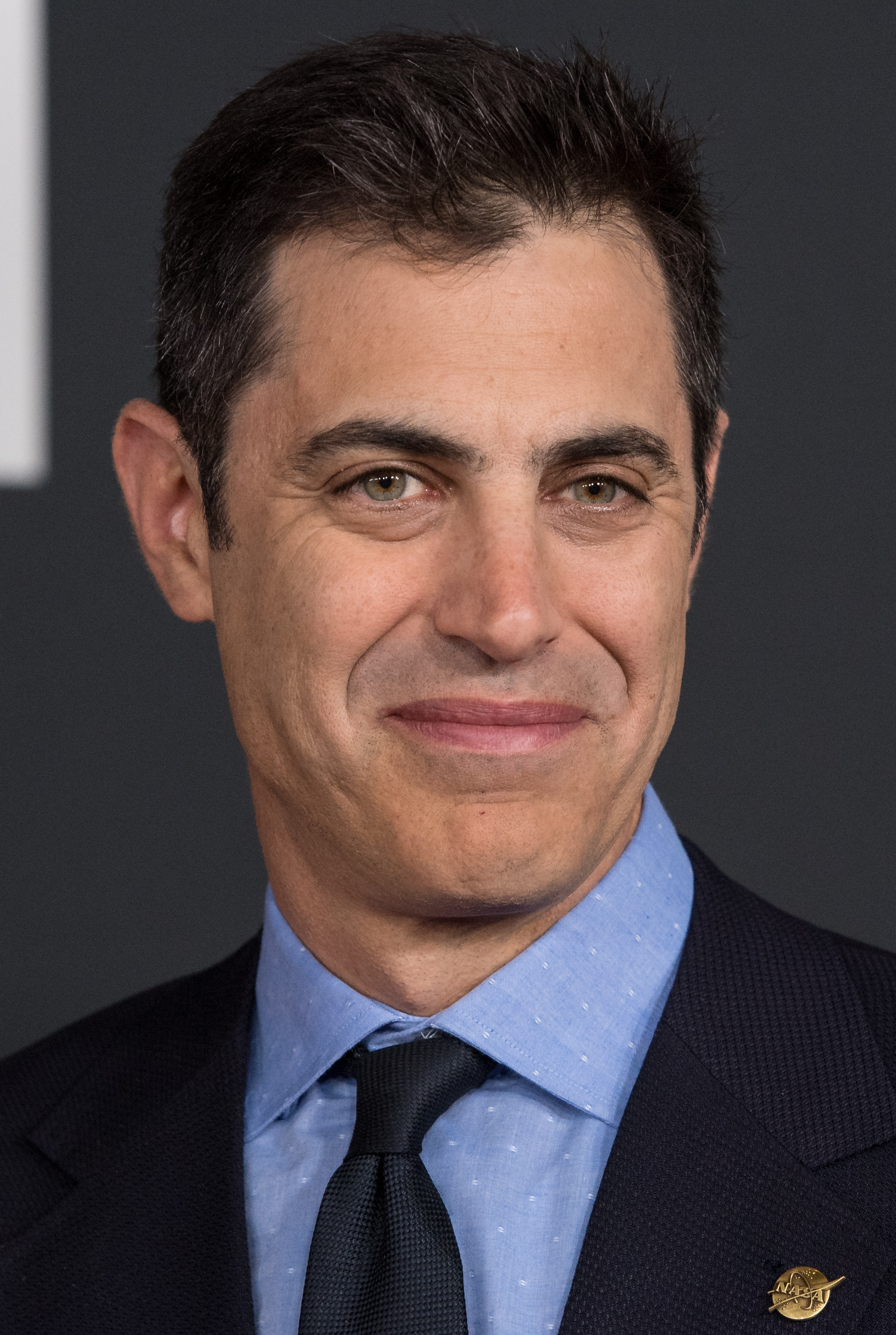
Tom McCarthy and Josh Singer, Best Original Screenplay winners

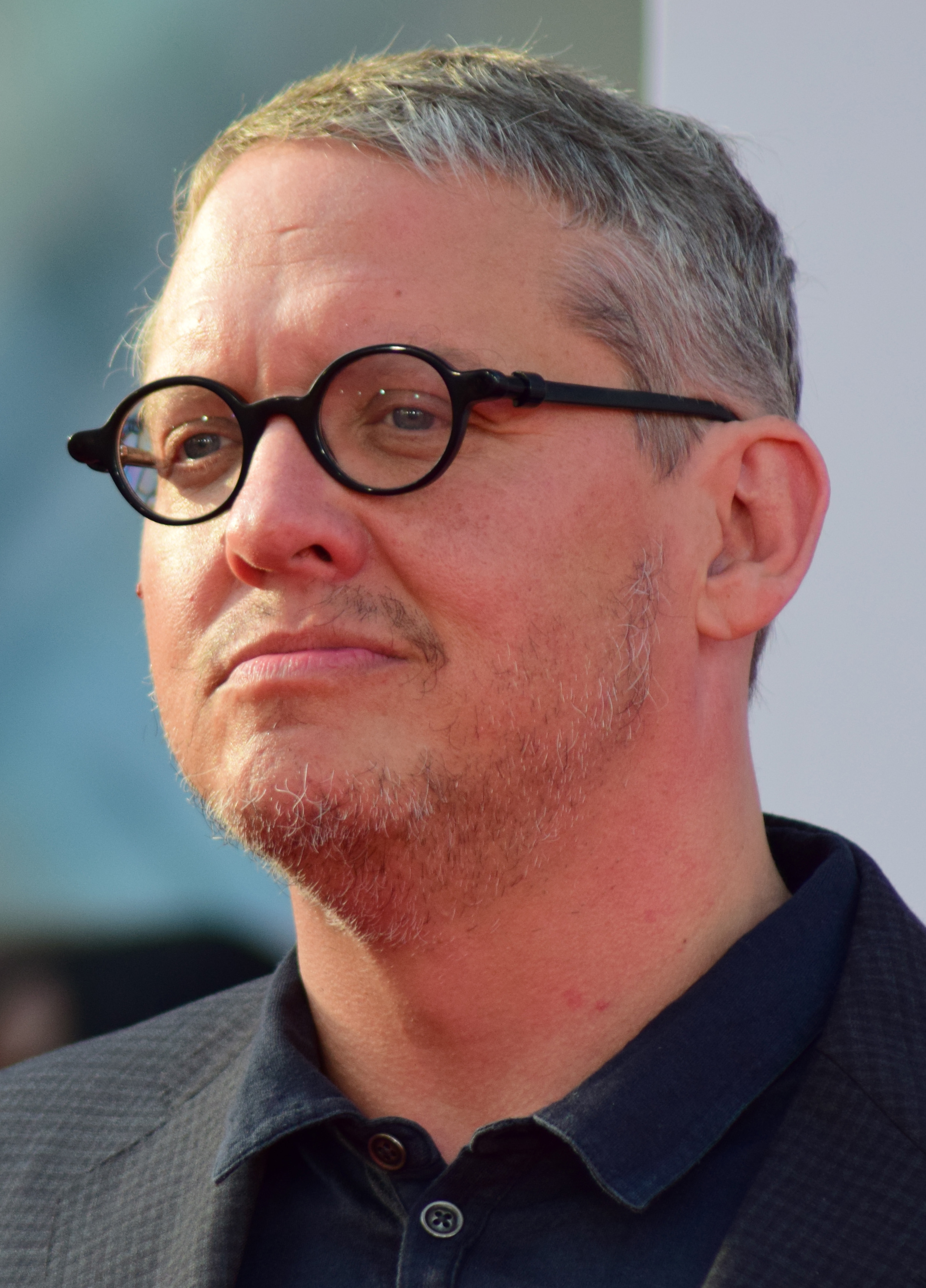
Adam McKay, Best Adapted Screenplay co-winner

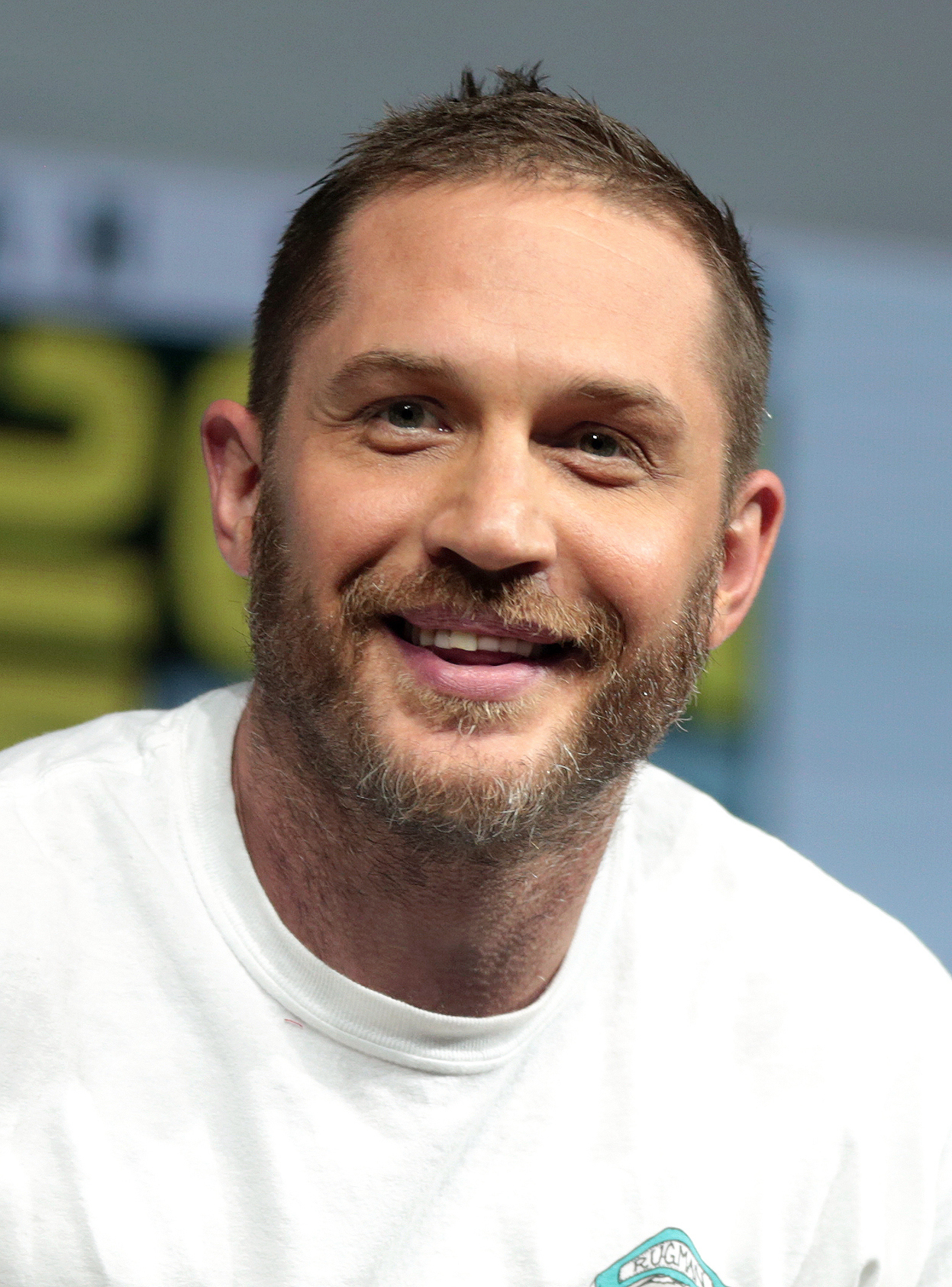
Tom Hardy, Best Actor in an Action Movie winner

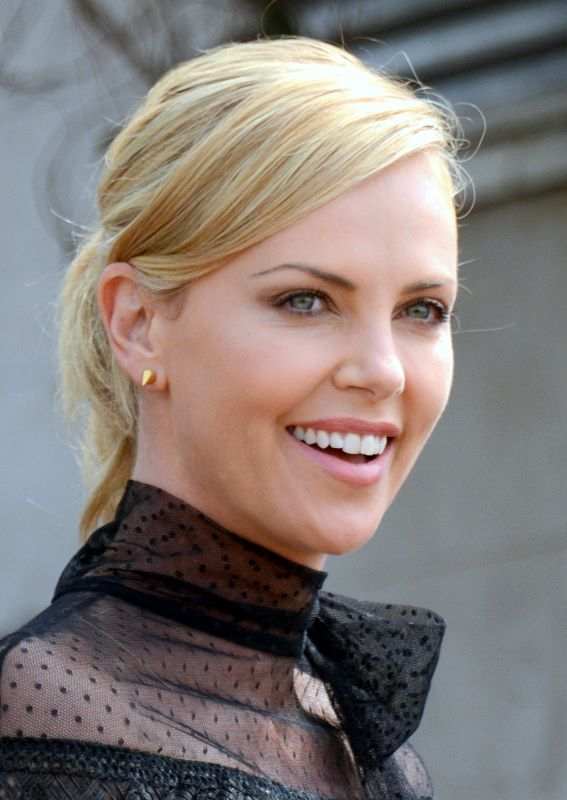
Charlize Theron, Best Actress in an Action Movie winner

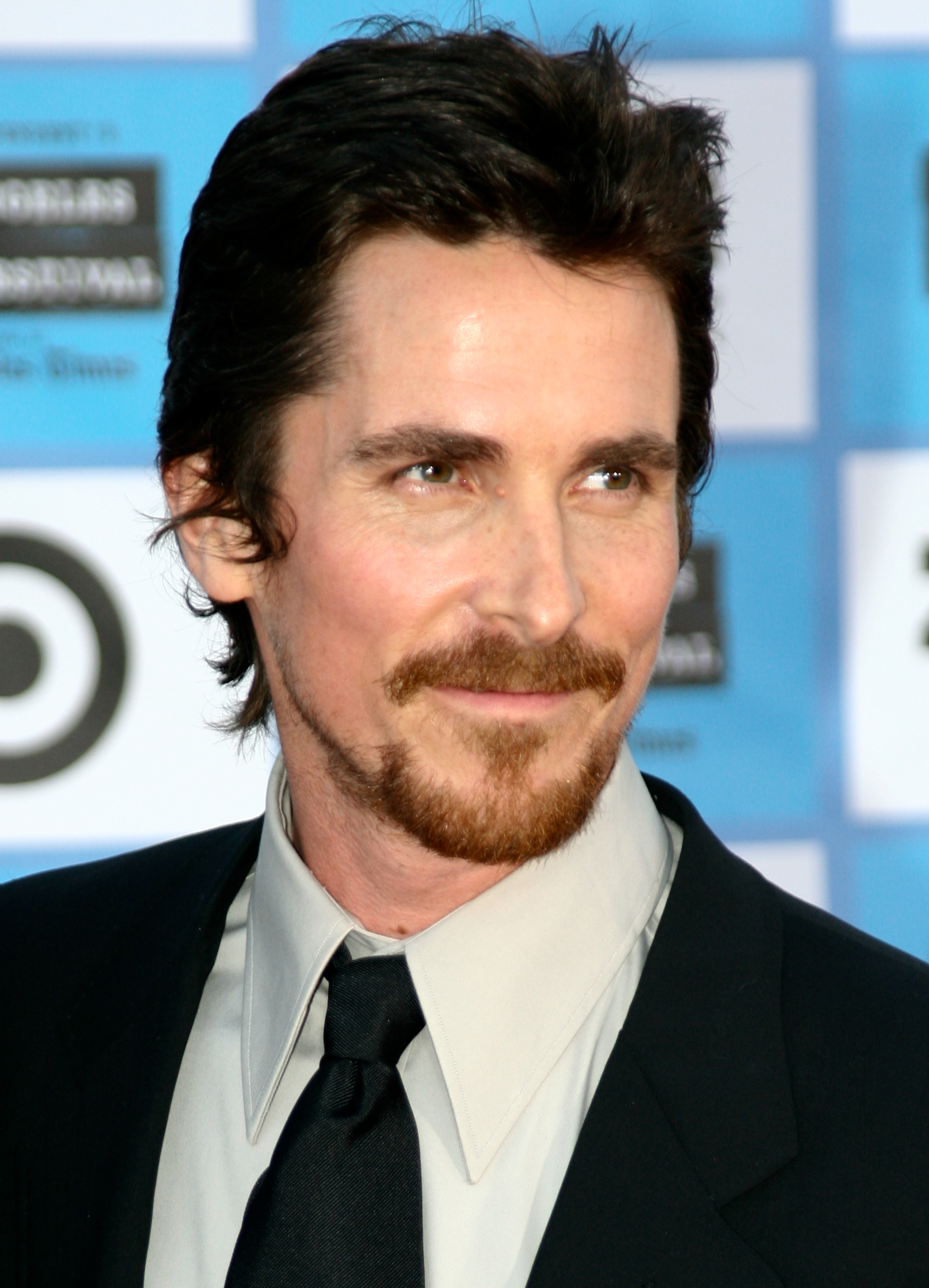
Christian Bale, Best Actor in a Comedy Movie winner

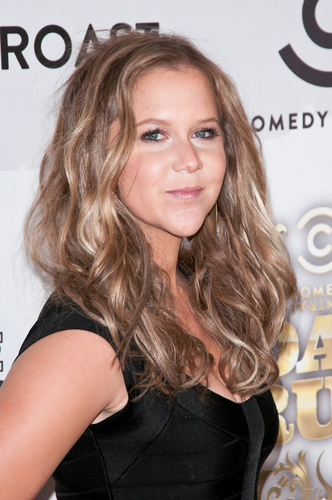
Amy Schumer, Best Actress in a Comedy Movie winner

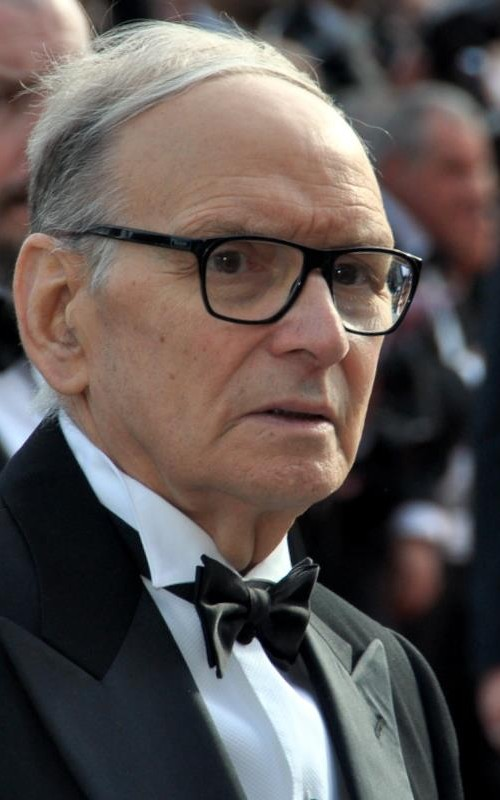
Ennio Morricone, Best Score winner

Best Picture Spotlight: The Big Short; Bridge of Spies; Brooklyn; Carol; Mad Max: Fury Road; The Martian; The Revenant; Room; Sicario; Star Wars: The Force Awakens	Best Director George Miller – Mad Max: Fury Road: Todd Haynes – Carol; Alejandro G. Iñárritu – The Revenant; Tom McCarthy – Spotlight; Ridley Scott – The Martian; Steven Spielberg – Bridge of Spies
Best Actor Leonardo DiCaprio – The Revenant as Hugh Glass: Bryan Cranston – Trumbo as Dalton Trumbo; Matt Damon – The Martian as Mark Watney; Johnny Depp – Black Mass as James "Whitey" Bulger; Michael Fassbender – Steve Jobs as Steve Jobs; Eddie Redmayne – The Danish Girl as Lili Elbe / Einar Wegener	Best Actress Brie Larson – Room as Joy "Ma" Newsome: Cate Blanchett – Carol as Carol Aird; Jennifer Lawrence – Joy as Joy Mangano; Charlotte Rampling – 45 Years as Kate Mercer; Saoirse Ronan – Brooklyn as Eilis Lacey; Charlize Theron – Mad Max: Fury Road as Imperator Furiosa
Best Supporting Actor Sylvester Stallone – Creed as Rocky Balboa: Paul Dano – Love & Mercy as Brian Wilson; Tom Hardy – The Revenant as John Fitzgerald; Mark Ruffalo – Spotlight as Michael Rezendes; Mark Rylance – Bridge of Spies as Rudolf Abel; Michael Shannon – 99 Homes as Rick Carver	Best Supporting Actress Alicia Vikander – The Danish Girl as Gerda Wegener: Jennifer Jason Leigh – The Hateful Eight as Daisy Domergue; Rooney Mara – Carol as Therese Belivet; Rachel McAdams – Spotlight as Sacha Pfeiffer; Helen Mirren – Trumbo as Hedda Hopper; Kate Winslet – Steve Jobs as Joanna Hoffman
Best Young Actor/Actress Jacob Tremblay – Room as Jack Newsome: Abraham Attah – Beasts of No Nation as Agu; RJ Cyler – Me and Earl and the Dying Girl as Earl Jackson; Shameik Moore – Dope as Malcolm Adekanbi; Milo Parker – Mr. Holmes as Roger Munro	Best Acting Ensemble Spotlight: The Big Short; The Hateful Eight; Straight Outta Compton; Trumbo
Best Original Screenplay Tom McCarthy and Josh Singer – Spotlight: Matt Charman, Ethan Coen, and Joel Coen – Bridge of Spies; Pete Docter, Meg LeFauve, and Josh Cooley – Inside Out; Alex Garland – Ex Machina; Quentin Tarantino – The Hateful Eight	Best Adapted Screenplay Adam McKay and Charles Randolph – The Big Short: Emma Donoghue – Room; Drew Goddard – The Martian; Nick Hornby – Brooklyn; Aaron Sorkin – Steve Jobs
Best Animated Feature Inside Out: Anomalisa; The Good Dinosaur; The Peanuts Movie; Shaun the Sheep Movie
Best Documentary Feature Amy: Cartel Land; Going Clear; He Named Me Malala; The Look of Silence; Where to Invade Next	Best Foreign Language Film Son of Saul (Saul fia) • Hungary: The Assassin (Cìkè Niè Yǐnniáng) • China / Hong Kong / Taiwan; Goodnight Mommy (Ich seh, Ich seh) • Austria; Mustang • France / Germany / Turkey; The Second Mother (Que Horas Ela Volta?) • Brazil
Best Action Movie Mad Max: Fury Road: Furious 7; Jurassic World; Mission: Impossible – Rogue Nation; Sicario
Best Actor in an Action Movie Tom Hardy – Mad Max: Fury Road as Max Rockatansky: Daniel Craig – Spectre as James Bond; Tom Cruise – Mission: Impossible – Rogue Nation as Ethan Hunt; Chris Pratt – Jurassic World as Owen Grady; Paul Rudd – Ant-Man as Scott Lang / Ant-Man	Best Actress in an Action Movie Charlize Theron – Mad Max: Fury Road as Imperator Furiosa: Emily Blunt – Sicario as Kate Macer; Rebecca Ferguson – Mission: Impossible – Rogue Nation as Ilsa Faust; Bryce Dallas Howard – Jurassic World as Claire Dearing; Jennifer Lawrence – The Hunger Games: Mockingjay – Part 2 as Katniss Everdeen
Best Comedy Movie The Big Short: Inside Out; Joy; Sisters; Spy; Trainwreck
Best Actor in a Comedy Movie Christian Bale – The Big Short as Michael Burry: Steve Carell – The Big Short as Mark Baum; Robert De Niro – The Intern as Ben Whittaker; Bill Hader – Trainwreck as Dr. Aaron Conners; Jason Statham – Spy as Rick Ford	Best Actress in a Comedy Movie Amy Schumer – Trainwreck as Amy Townsend: Tina Fey – Sisters as Kate Ellis; Jennifer Lawrence – Joy as Joy Mangano; Melissa McCarthy – Spy as Susan Cooper; Lily Tomlin – Grandma as Elle Reid
Best Sci-Fi/Horror Movie Ex Machina: It Follows; Jurassic World; Mad Max: Fury Road; The Martian
Best Art Direction Colin Gibson (Production Designer), Lisa Thompson (Set Decorator) – Mad Max: Fury Road: Judy Becker (Production Designer), Heather Loeffler (Set Decorator) – Carol; Arthur Max (Production Designer), Celia Bobak (Set Decorator) – The Martian; François Séguin (Production Designer), Jenny Oman and Louise Tremblay (Set Decorators) – Brooklyn; Eve Stewart (Production Designer), Michael Standish (Set Decorator) – The Danish Girl; Adam Stockhausen (Production Designer), Rena DeAngelo (Set Decorator) – Bridge of Spies	Best Cinematography Emmanuel Lubezki – The Revenant: Roger Deakins – Sicario; Edward Lachman – Carol; Robert Richardson – The Hateful Eight; John Seale – Mad Max: Fury Road; Dariusz Wolski – The Martian
Best Costume Design Jenny Beavan – Mad Max: Fury Road: Paco Delgado – The Danish Girl; Odile Dicks-Mireaux – Brooklyn; Sandy Powell – Carol; Sandy Powell – Cinderella	Best Editing Margaret Sixel – Mad Max: Fury Road: Hank Corwin – The Big Short; Tom McArdle – Spotlight; Stephen Mirrione – The Revenant; Pietro Scalia – The Martian
Best Score Ennio Morricone – The Hateful Eight: Carter Burwell – Carol; Jóhann Jóhannsson – Sicario; Ryuichi Sakamoto and Alva Noto – The Revenant; Howard Shore – Spotlight	Best Song "See You Again" – Furious 7: "Love Me like You Do" – Fifty Shades of Grey; "One Kind of Love" – Love & Mercy; "Simple Song #3" – Youth; "Til It Happens to You" – The Hunting Ground; "Writing's on the Wall" – Spectre
Best Hair and Makeup Mad Max: Fury Road: Black Mass; Carol; The Danish Girl; The Hateful Eight; The Revenant	Best Visual Effects Mad Max: Fury Road: Ex Machina; Jurassic World; The Martian; The Revenant; The Walk

=== Television ===
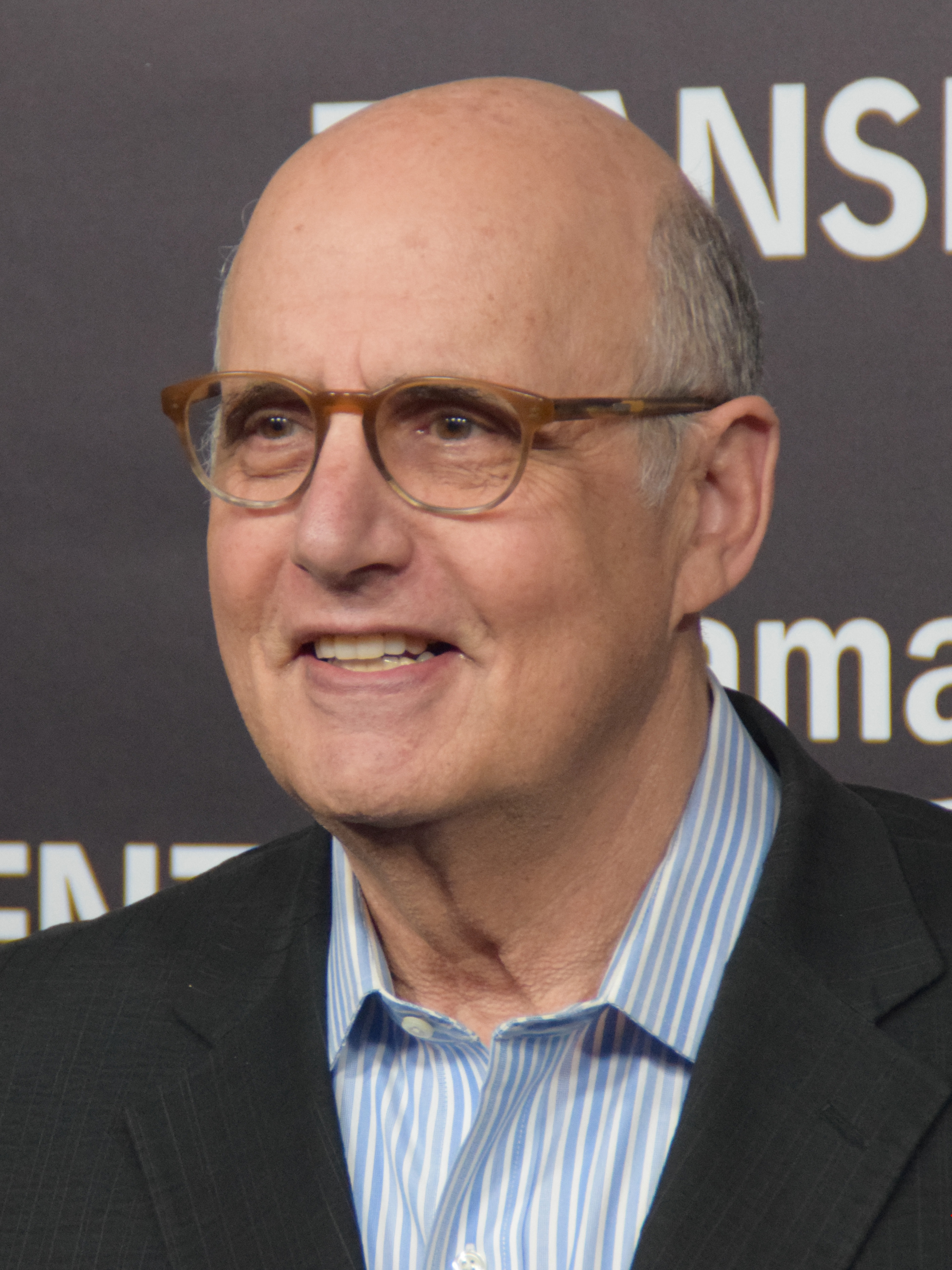
Jeffrey Tambor, Best Actor in a Comedy Series winner

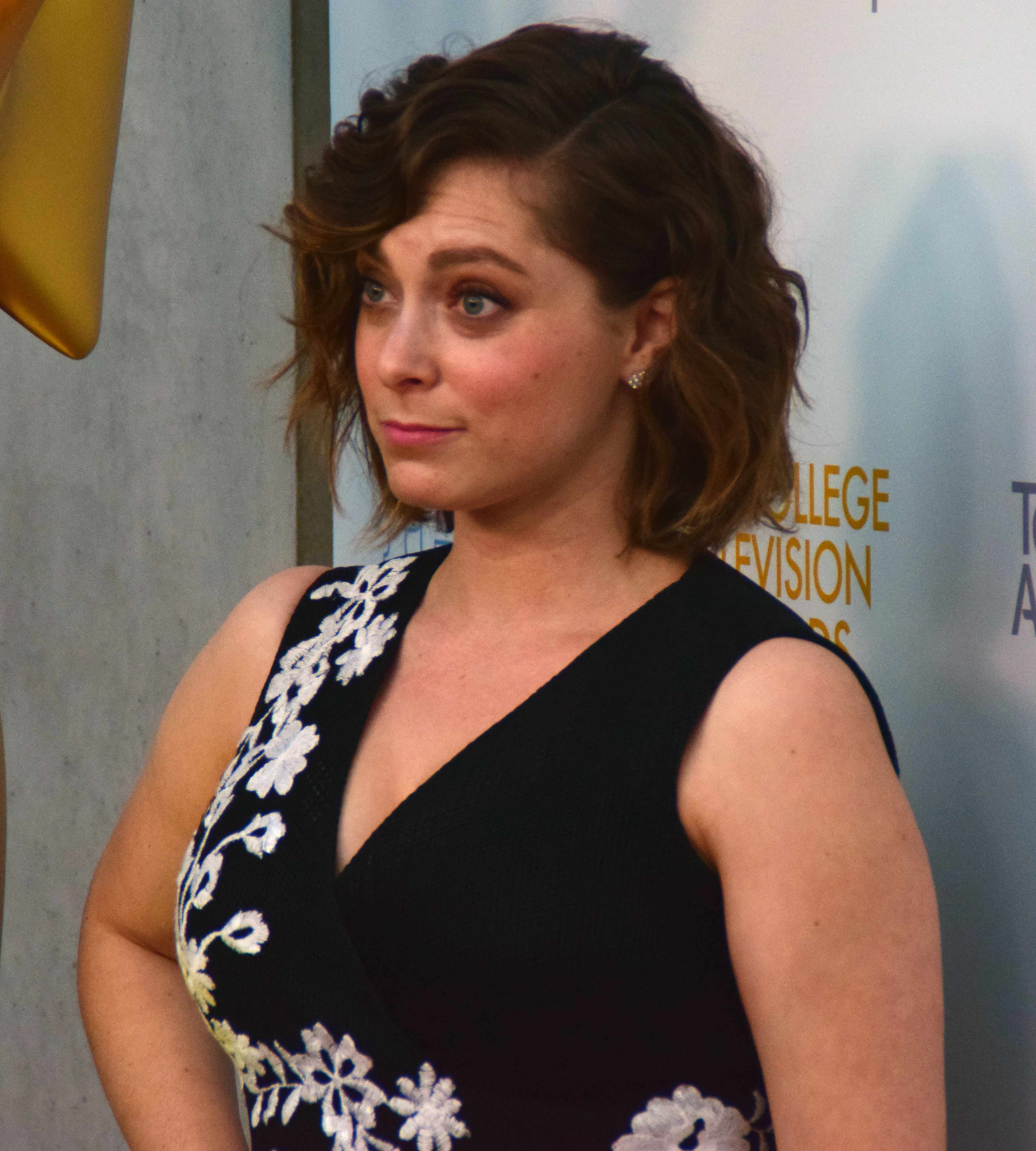
Rachel Bloom, Best Actress in a Comedy Series winner

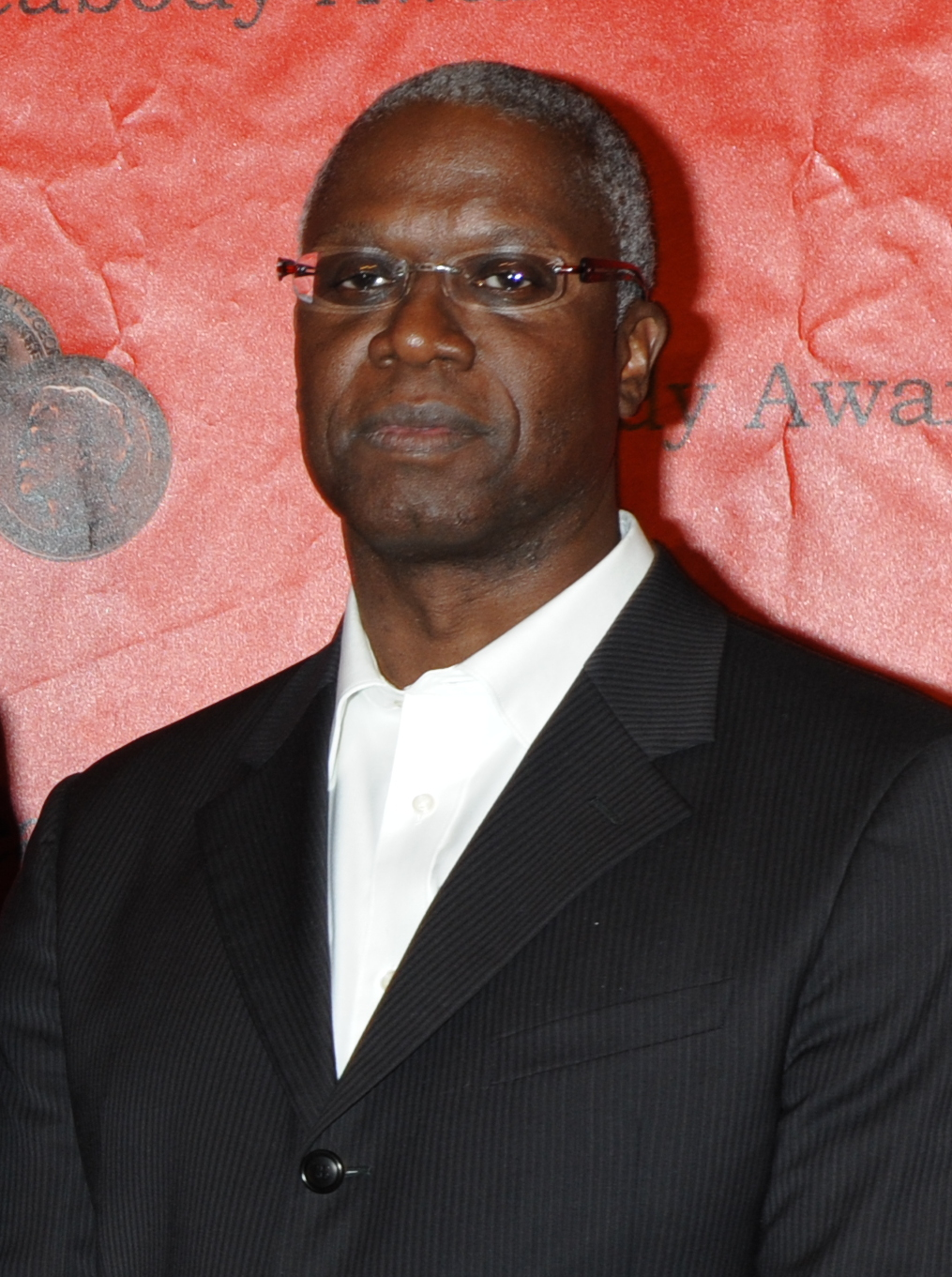
Andre Braugher, Best Supporting Actor in a Comedy Series winner

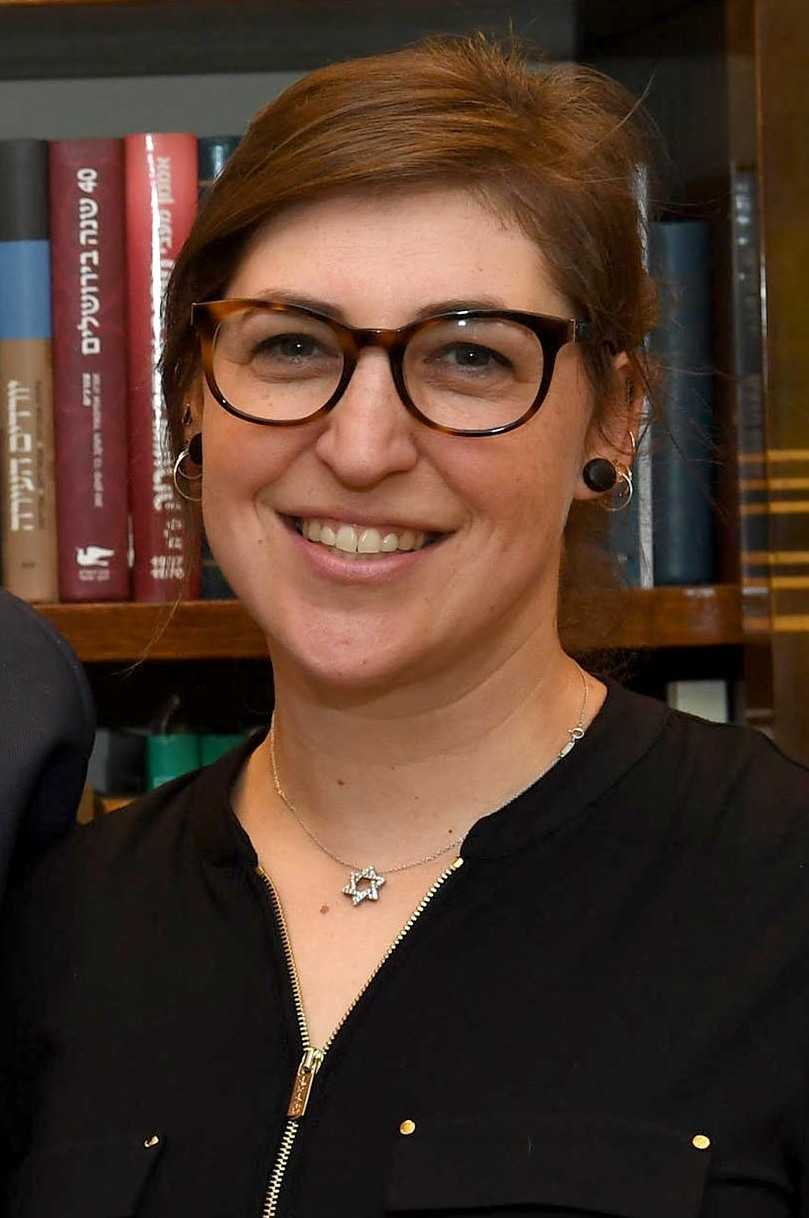
Mayim Bialik, Best Supporting Actress in a Comedy Series winner

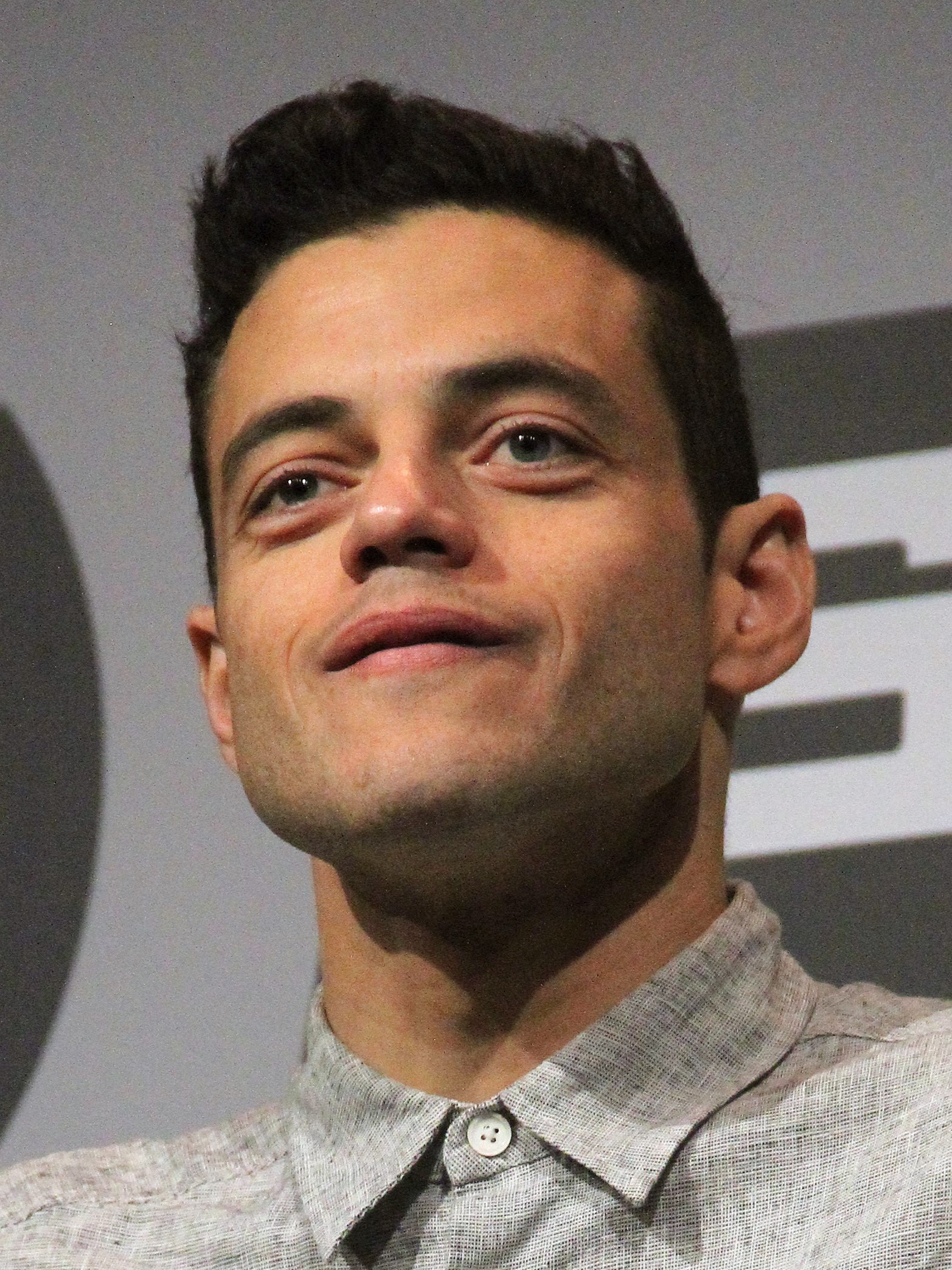
Rami Malek, Best Actor in a Drama Series winner

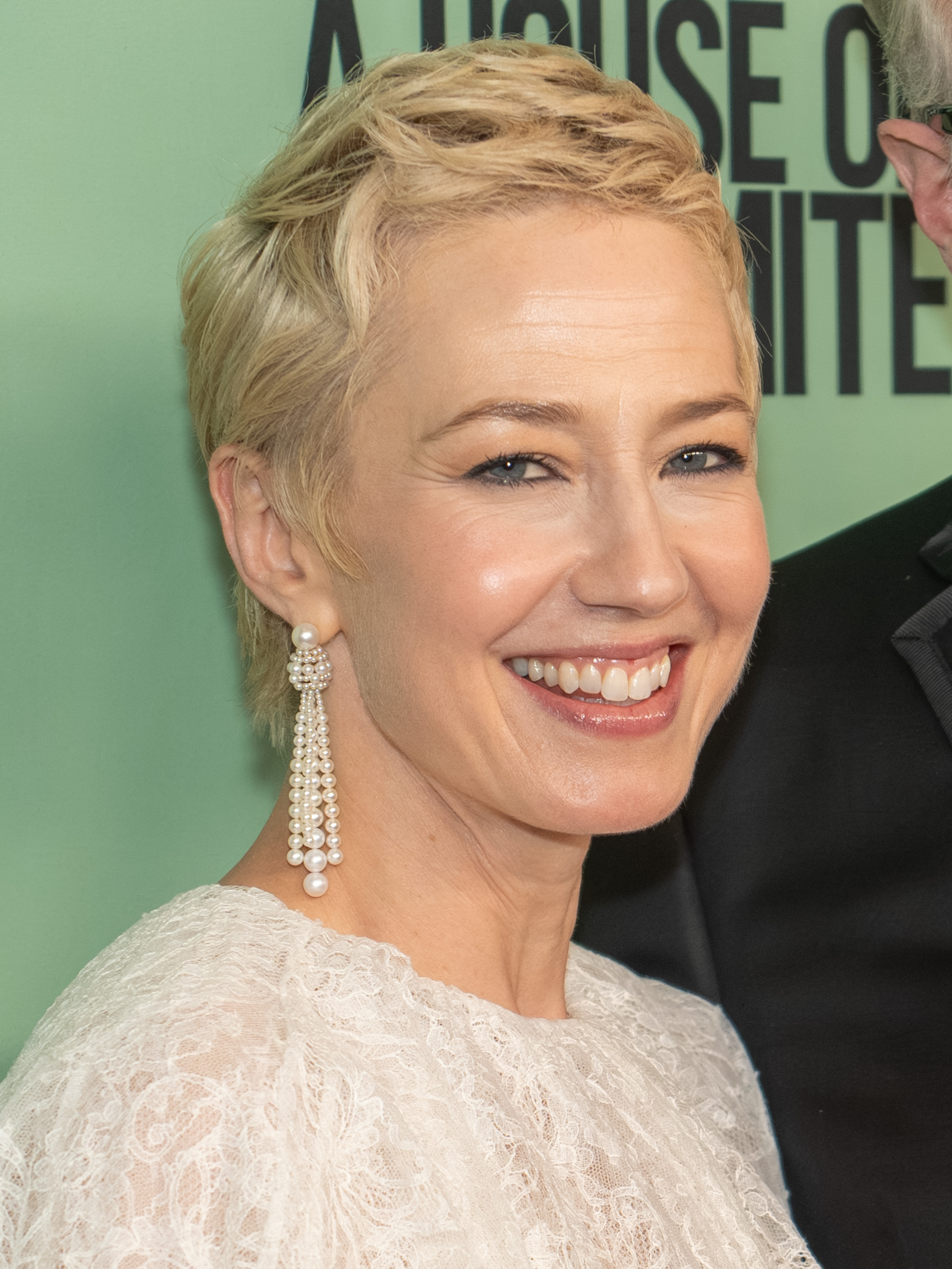
Carrie Coon, Best Actress in a Drama Series winner

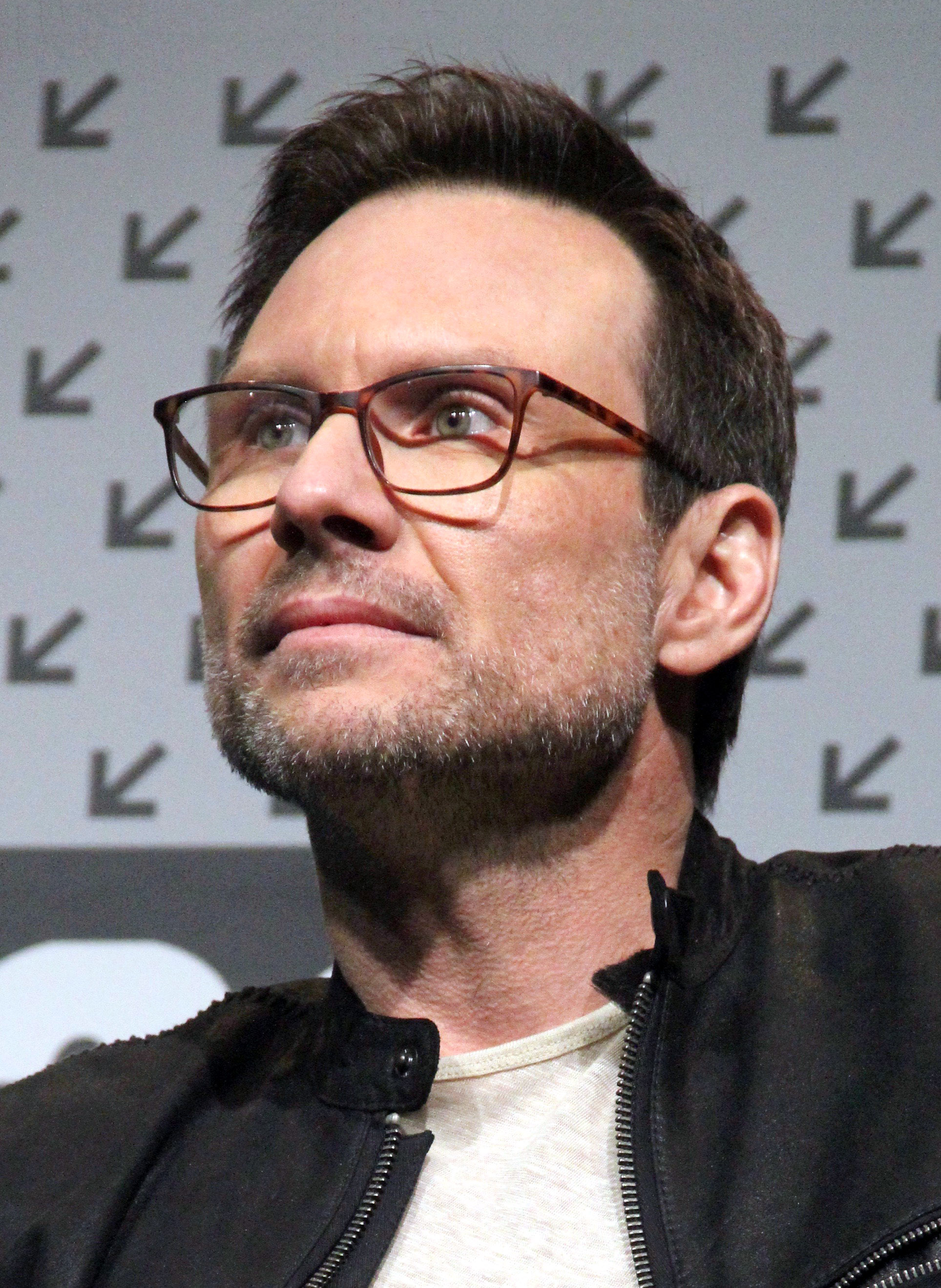
Christian Slater, Best Supporting Actor in a Drama Series winner

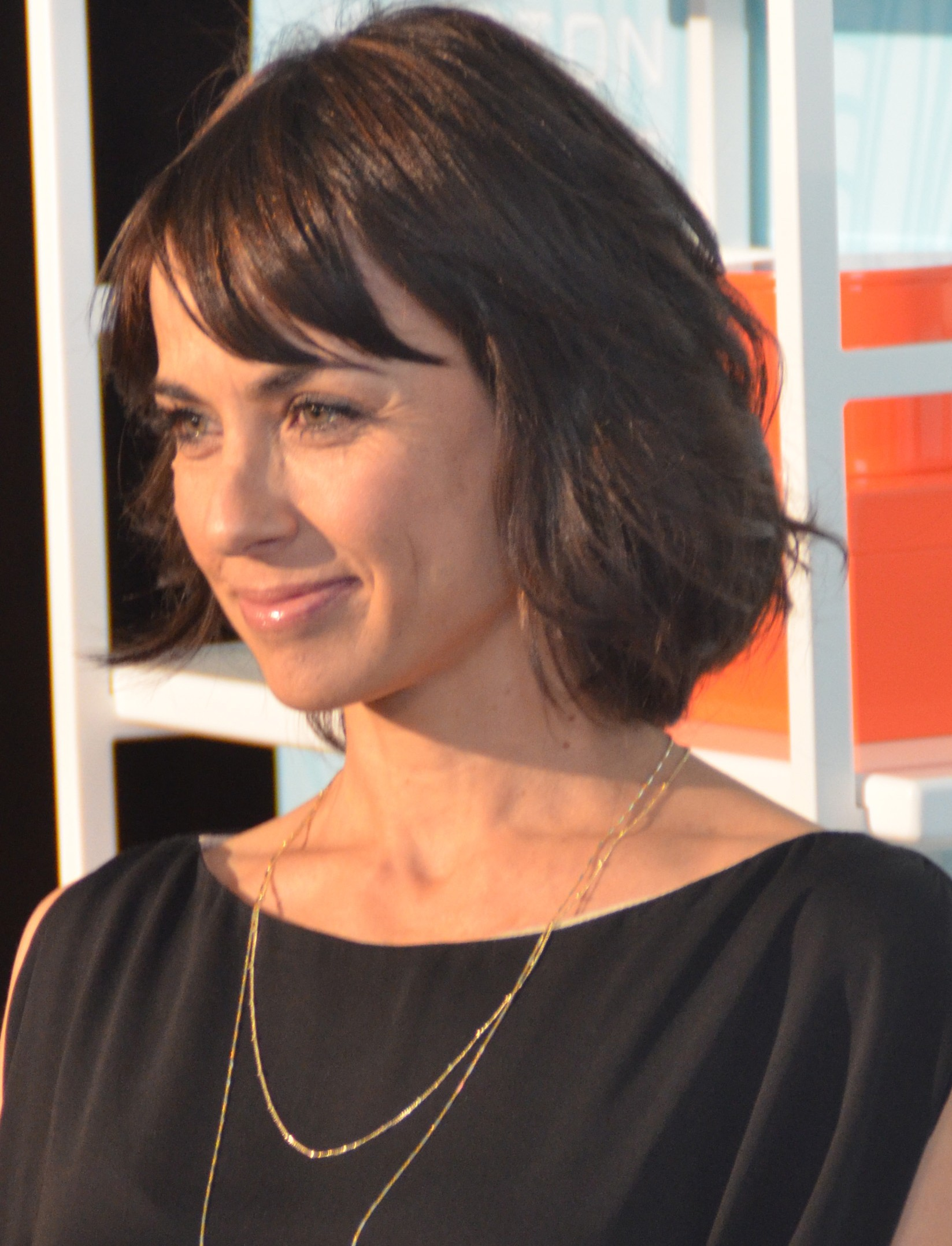
Constance Zimmer, Best Supporting Actress in a Drama Series winner

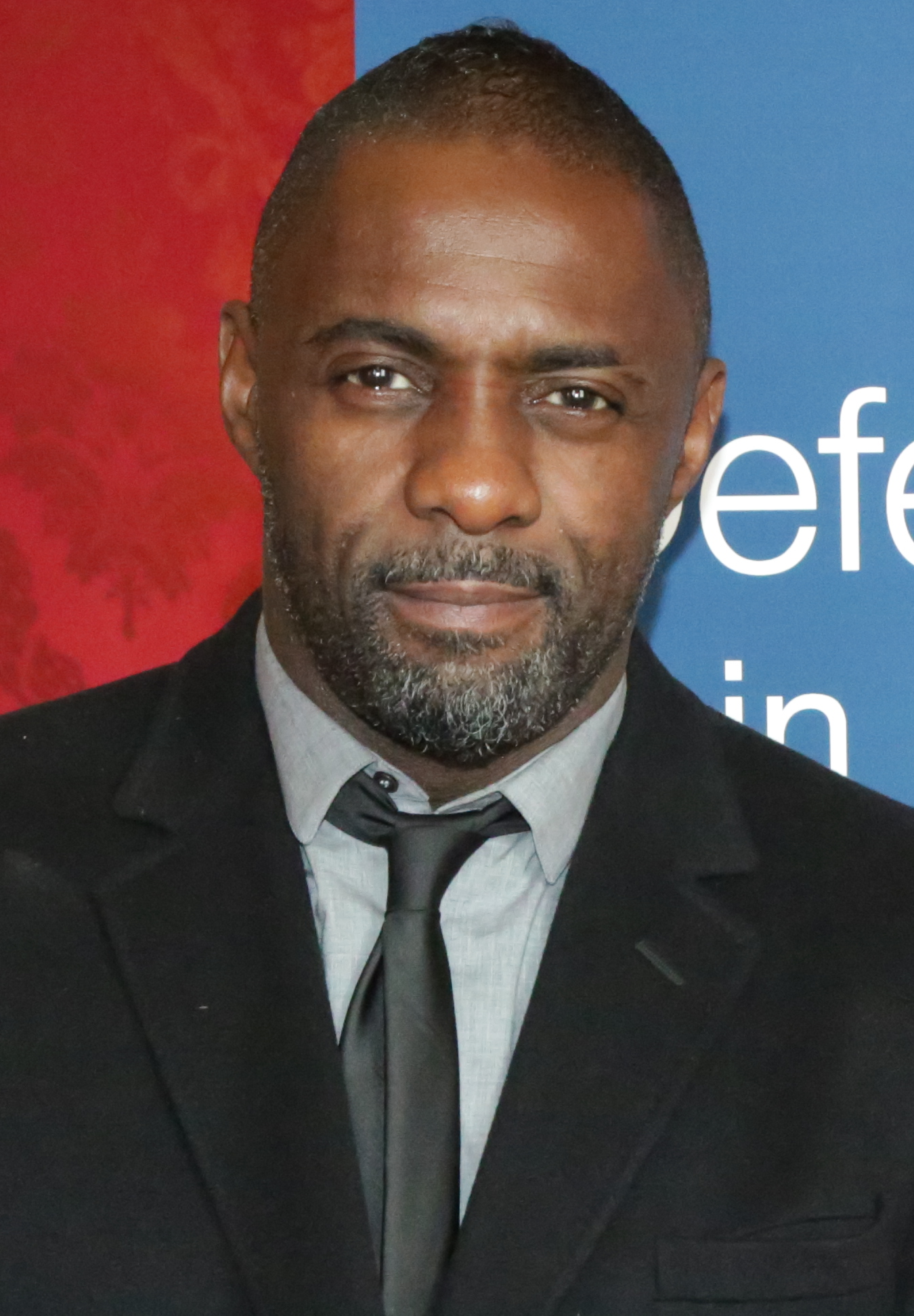
Idris Elba, Best Actor in a Movie Made for Television or Limited Series winner

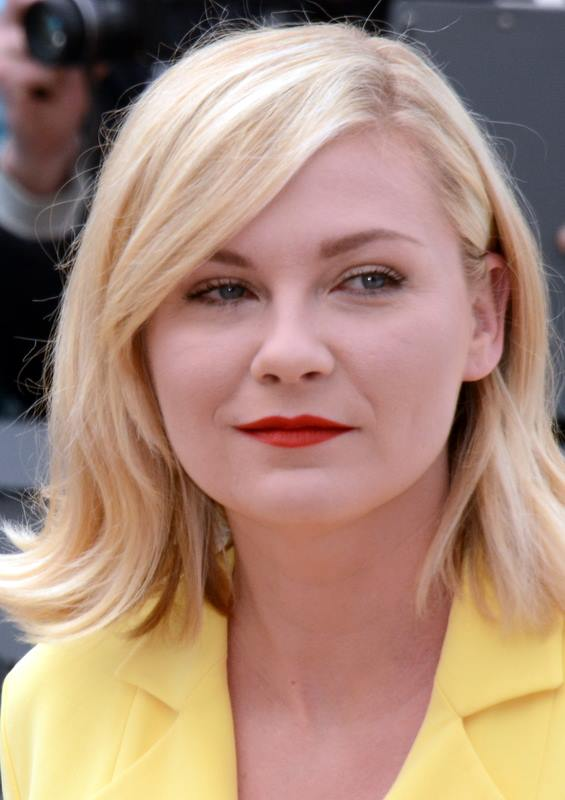
Kirsten Dunst, Best Actress in a Movie Made for Television or Limited Series winner

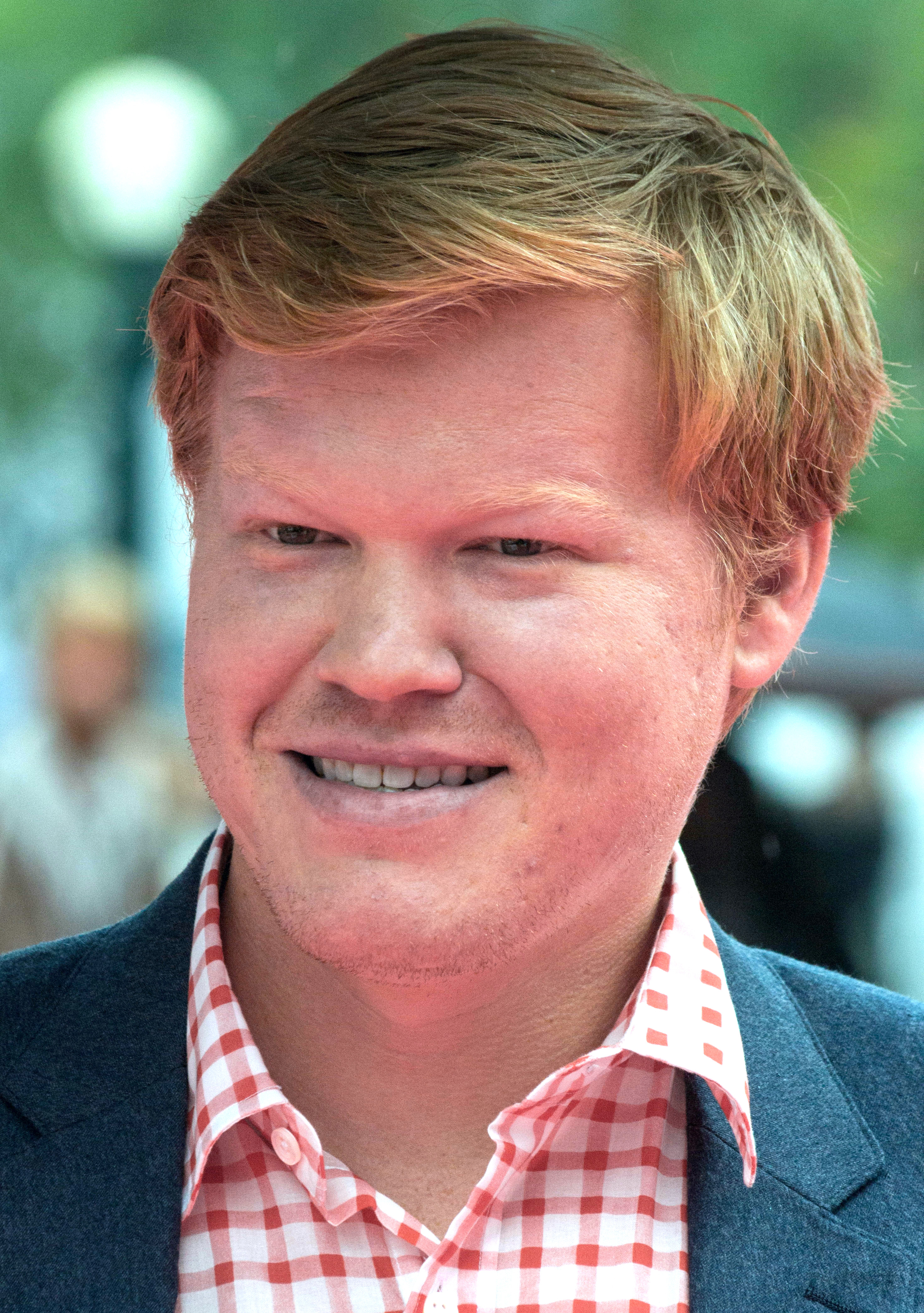
Jesse Plemons, Best Supporting Actor in a Movie Made for Television or Limited Series winner

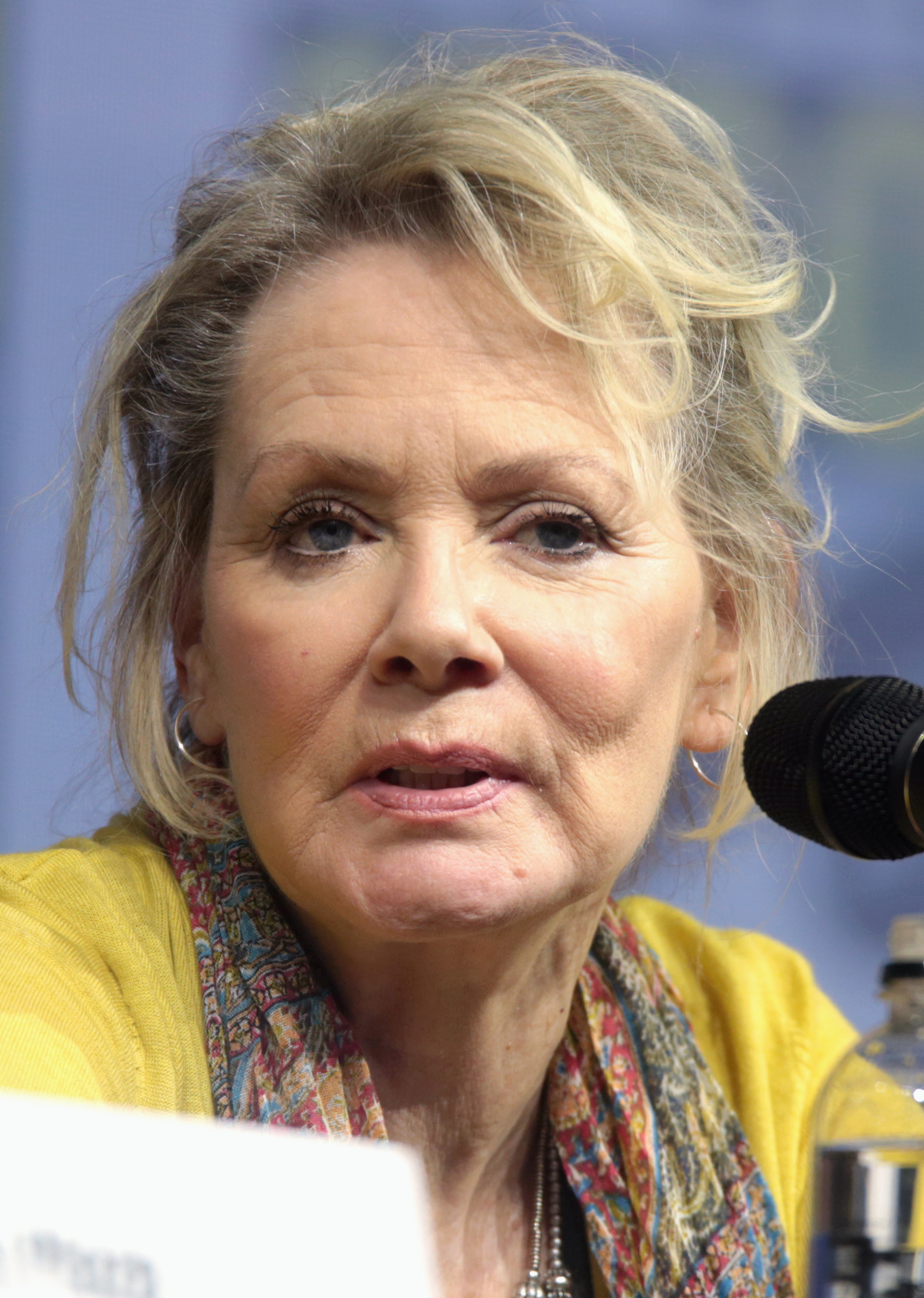
Jean Smart, Best Supporting Actress in a Movie Made for Television or Limited Series winner

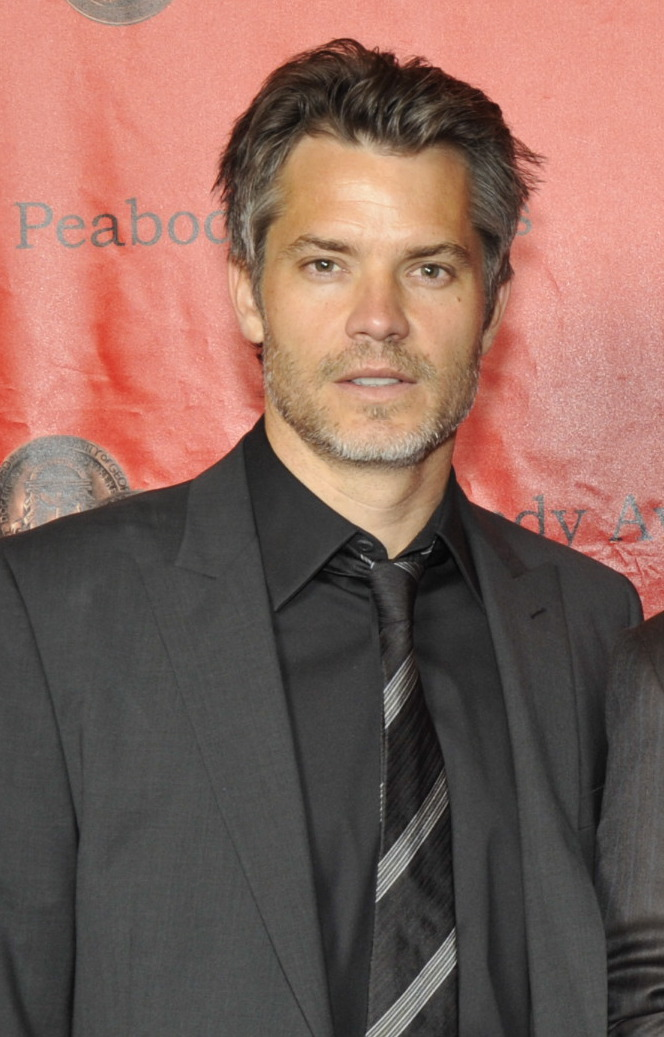
Timothy Olyphant, Best Guest Actor/Actress in a Comedy Series winner

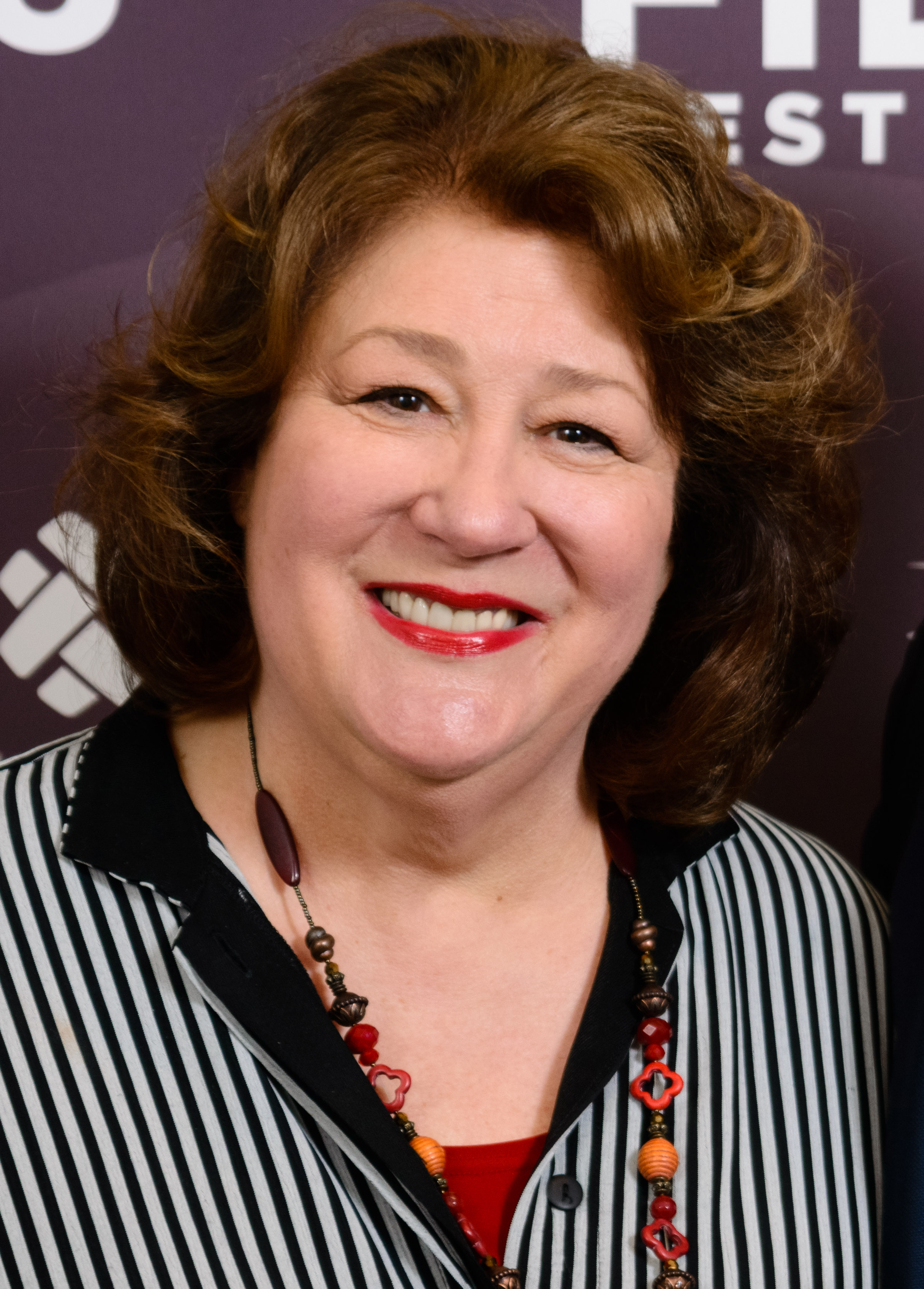
Margo Martindale, Best Guest Actor/Actress in a Drama Series winner

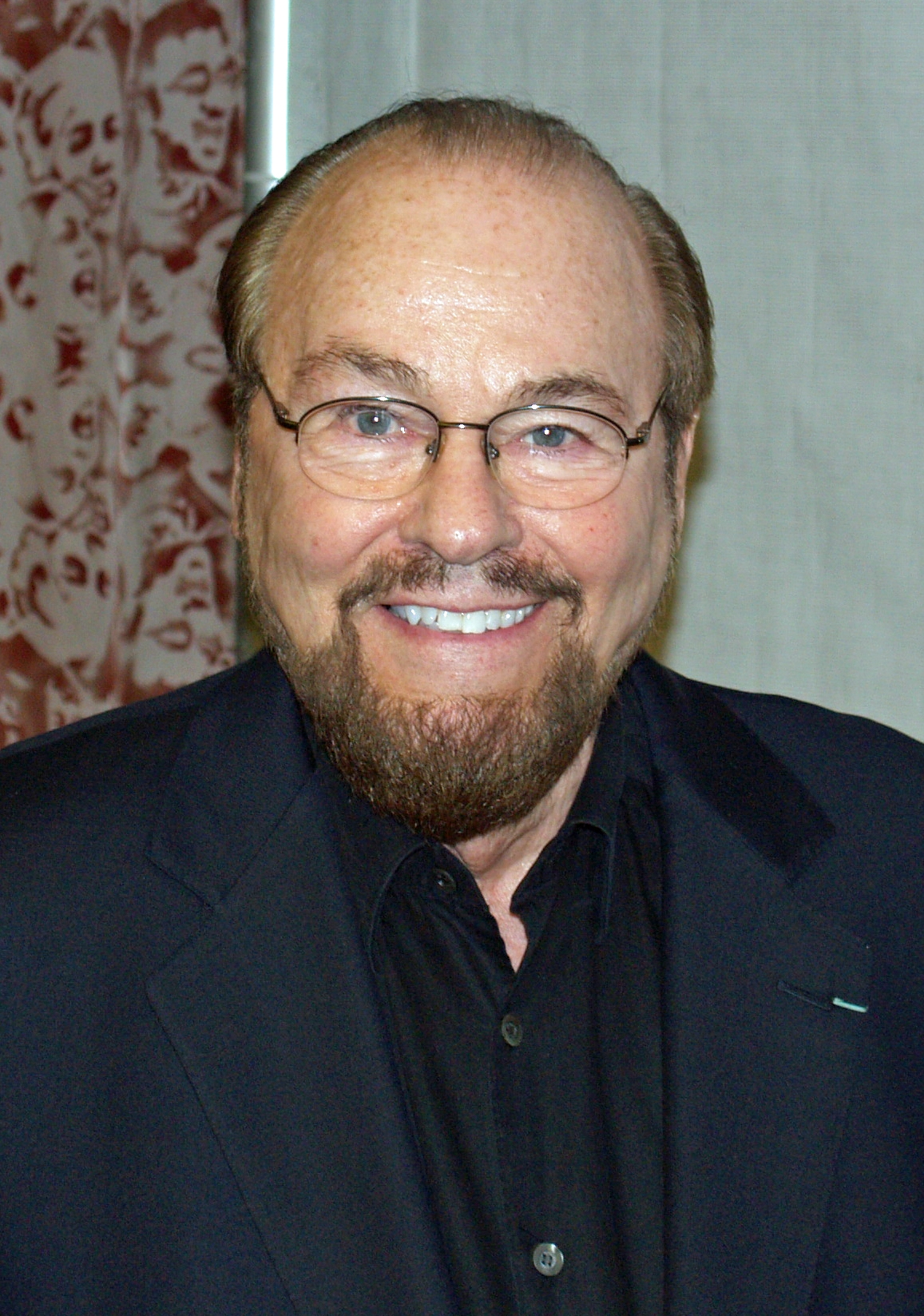
James Lipton, Best Reality Show Host winner

Best Series
Best Comedy Series	Best Drama Series
Master of None (Netflix): Black-ish (ABC); Catastrophe (Amazon); Jane the Virgin (The CW); The Last Man on Earth (Fox); Transparent (Amazon); You're the Worst (FXX)	Mr. Robot (USA): Empire (Fox); The Knick (Cinemax); The Leftovers (HBO); Penny Dreadful (Showtime); Rectify (Sundance); UnREAL (Lifetime)
Best Movie Made for Television or Limited Series	Best Animation Series
Fargo (FX): Childhood's End (Syfy); Luther (BBC America); Saints & Strangers (Nat Geo); Show Me a Hero (HBO); The Wiz Live! (NBC)	BoJack Horseman (Netflix): Bob's Burgers (Fox); The Simpsons (Fox); South Park (Comedy Central); Star Wars Rebels (Disney XD)
Most Bingeworthy Show	Most Exciting New Series (All Honored)
Outlander (Starz): Empire (Fox); Friends (NBC); Game of Thrones (HBO); Orange Is the New Black (Netflix); The Walking Dead (AMC)	Atlanta (FX); Better Things (FX); Designated Survivor (ABC); The Good Place (NBC); One Mississippi (Amazon); Pitch (Fox); This Is Us (NBC); Westworld (HBO)
Best Acting in a Comedy Series
Best Actor	Best Actress
Jeffrey Tambor as Maura Pfefferman – Transparent: Anthony Anderson as Andre "Dre" Johnson, Sr. – Black-ish; Aziz Ansari as Dev Shah – Master of None; Will Forte as Phil Miller – The Last Man on Earth; Randall Park as Louis Huang – Fresh Off the Boat; Fred Savage as Stewart Sanderson – The Grinder	Rachel Bloom as Rebecca Bunch – Crazy Ex-Girlfriend: Aya Cash as Gretchen Cutler – You're the Worst; Wendi McLendon-Covey as Beverly Goldberg – The Goldbergs; Gina Rodriguez as Jane Villanueva – Jane the Virgin; Tracee Ellis Ross as Dr. Rainbow "Bow" Johnson – Black-ish; Constance Wu as Jessica Huang – Fresh Off the Boat
Best Supporting Actor	Best Supporting Actress
Andre Braugher as Captain Raymond Holt – Brooklyn Nine-Nine: Jaime Camil as Rogelio de la Vega – Jane the Virgin; Jay Duplass as Joshua Pfefferman – Transparent; Neil Flynn as Mike Heck – The Middle; Keegan-Michael Key as Mark Rodriguez – Playing House; Mel Rodriguez as Patsy De La Serda – Getting On	Mayim Bialik as Dr. Amy Farrah Fowler – The Big Bang Theory: Kether Donohue as Linsay Jillian – You're the Worst; Allison Janney as Bonnie Plunkett – Mom; Judith Light as Shelly Pfefferman – Transparent; Niecy Nash as Denise Ortley – Getting On; Eden Sher as Sue Heck – The Middle
Best Acting in a Drama Series
Best Actor	Best Actress
Rami Malek as Elliot Alderson – Mr. Robot: Hugh Dancy as Will Graham – Hannibal; Clive Owen as Dr. John W. Thackery – The Knick; Liev Schreiber as Ray Donovan – Ray Donovan; Justin Theroux as Kevin Garvey Jr. – The Leftovers; Aden Young as Daniel Holden – Rectify	Carrie Coon as Nora Durst – The Leftovers: Shiri Appleby as Rachel Goldberg – UnREAL; Viola Davis as Professor Annalise Keating, Esq. – How to Get Away with Murder; Eva Green as Vanessa Ives – Penny Dreadful; Taraji P. Henson as Cookie Lyon – Empire; Krysten Ritter as Jessica Jones – Jessica Jones
Best Supporting Actor	Best Supporting Actress
Christian Slater as Mr. Robot – Mr. Robot: Clayne Crawford as Ted Talbot Jr. – Rectify; Christopher Eccleston as Matt Jamison – The Leftovers; André Holland as Dr. Algernon Edwards – The Knick; Jonathan Jackson as Avery Barkley – Nashville; Rufus Sewell as John Smith – The Man in the High Castle	Constance Zimmer as Quinn King – UnREAL: Ann Dowd as Patti Levin – The Leftovers; Regina King as Erika Murphy – The Leftovers; Helen McCrory as Evelyn Poole – Penny Dreadful; Hayden Panettiere as Juliette Barnes – Nashville; Maura Tierney as Helen Solloway – The Affair
Best Acting in a Movie Made for Television or Limited Series
Best Actor	Best Actress
Idris Elba as John Luther – Luther: Wes Bentley as Det. John Lowe – American Horror Story: Hotel; Martin Clunes as Arthur Conan Doyle – Arthur & George; Oscar Isaac as Nick Wasicsko – Show Me a Hero; Vincent Kartheiser as William Bradford – Saints & Strangers; Patrick Wilson as State Trooper Lou Solverson – Fargo	Kirsten Dunst as Peggy Blumquist – Fargo: Kathy Bates as Iris – American Horror Story: Hotel; Sarah Hay as Claire Robbins – Flesh and Bone; Alyvia Alyn Lind as Dolly Parton – Dolly Parton's Coat of Many Colors; Rachel McAdams as Detective Sergeant Antigone "Ani" Bezzerides – True Detective; Shanice Williams as Dorothy Gale – The Wiz Live!
Best Supporting Actor	Best Supporting Actress
Jesse Plemons as Ed Blumquist – Fargo: David Alan Grier as The Cowardly Lion / Farmhand #2 – The Wiz Live!; Ne-Yo as Tin-Man / Farmhand #1 – The Wiz Live!; Nick Offerman as Karl Weathers – Fargo; Raoul Trujillo as Massasoit – Saints & Strangers; Bokeem Woodbine as Mike Milligan – Fargo	Jean Smart as Floyd Gerhardt – Fargo: Mary J. Blige as Wicked Witch of the West – The Wiz Live!; Laura Haddock as Megan Cantor – Luther; Cristin Milioti as Betsy Solverson – Fargo; Sarah Paulson as Sally McKenna and Billie Dean Howard – American Horror Story: Hotel; Winona Ryder as Vinni Restiano – Show Me a Hero
Best Guest Performing
Best Guest Actor/Actress in a Comedy Series	Best Guest Actor/Actress in a Drama Series
Timothy Olyphant as Himself – The Grinder: Ellen Burstyn as Shirley Stabler – Mom; Anjelica Huston as Vicki – Transparent; Cherry Jones as Leslie Mackinaw – Transparent; Jenifer Lewis as Ruby Johnson – Black-ish; John Slattery as Claude Dumet – Wet Hot American Summer: First Day of Camp	Margo Martindale as Ruth Eastman – The Good Wife: Richard Armitage as Francis Dolarhyde – Hannibal; Justin Kirk as Joseph Bucher – MANH(A)TTAN; Patti LuPone as Joan Clayton – Penny Dreadful; Marisa Tomei as Mimi Whiteman – Empire; BD Wong as Whiterose – Mr. Robot
Reality & Variety
Best Structured Reality Show	Best Unstructured Reality Show
Shark Tank (ABC): Antiques Roadshow (PBS); Inside the Actors Studio (Bravo); MythBusters (Discovery); Project Greenlight (HBO); Undercover Boss (CBS)	Anthony Bourdain: Parts Unknown (CNN): Cops (Spike); Deadliest Catch (Discovery); Intervention (A&E); Naked and Afraid (Discovery); Pawn Stars (History)
Best Reality Show – Competition	Best Reality Show Host
The Voice (NBC): The Amazing Race (CBS); Chopped (Food Network); Face Off (Syfy); MasterChef Junior (Fox); Survivor (CBS)	James Lipton – Inside the Actors Studio: Ted Allen – Chopped; Phil Keoghan – The Amazing Race; Jane Lynch – Hollywood Game Night; Jeff Probst – Survivor; Gordon Ramsay – Hell's Kitchen
Best Talk Show
Last Week Tonight with John Oliver (HBO): The Daily Show with Jon Stewart (Comedy Central); The Graham Norton Show (BBC America); Jimmy Kimmel Live! (ABC); The Late Late Show with James Corden (CBS); The Tonight Show Starring Jimmy Fallon (NBC)

=== Louis XIII Genius Award ===
Industrial Light & Magic

=== Critics' Choice MVP Award ===
Amy Schumer

== Star Wars: The Force Awakens addition ==
The film Star Wars: The Force Awakens screened too late for the vast majority of the Broadcast Film Critics Association to see it in time for consideration for the awards. But after what an email to members called "an unprecedented cry out" from its membership, the BFCA's board of directors called a "special referendum" on adding the film to the ten candidates for Best Picture, which it won. (Note: A similar exception to the rules was made once before for the 6th Critics' Choice Awards in 2001, in which the film Cast Away was voted by referendum to be included among the nominees for Best Picture after it also screened too late for normal consideration.) The BFCA faced immediate criticism, including from its own members, over what many saw as an attempt to increase ratings for the awards ceremony's broadcast on A&E (which is 50% owned by Disney, the company behind Star Wars) on January 17, 2016. Two members—Eric Melin (editor-in-chief of Scene-Stealers.com, a film critic of Lawrence Journal-World, and the president of the Kansas City Film Critics Circle) and Scott Renshaw (editor of Salt Lake City Weekly)—resigned in protest.

Melin, in an open letter, wrote:

"In order for a professional critics body to have integrity, nomination and voting guidelines must be consistent with the way they were laid out at the beginning of the process. Nominating Star Wars: The Force Awakens for Best Picture does not follow those guidelines, and re-ignites a loophole for this kind of thing to happen every year... Unlike the other nominations, this was not decided upon using a weighted ballot of all possibilities, and it smells like a desperate ploy to get better TV ratings. Additionally, your insistence on billing the Critic's Choice Awards as the 'most accurate predictor of the Academy Awards' is antithetical to the purpose of having a 'critic's choice' award at all. The awards should not serve as another TV marketing arm to the studios. Rather, it should represent the views and opinions of film critics, which is a very different group from the Academy of Motion Picture Arts and Sciences. As film criticism continues to be devalued and the lines between journalist, critic, and studio shill continue to be blurred, the only thing we have is our integrity, and this smacks of a marketing ploy. Believe me, I know because my day job is a social media marketer. What I am not is an employee of A&E Networks, and the only thing I have as a lowly paid film critic is the courage of my convictions."

— Eric Melin,

Similarly, in another open letter, Renshaw wrote:

"This decision has been a long time coming, but was made inevitable by the decision to change the voting process to allow Star Wars: Episode VII – The Force Awakens to be included as a nominee after the official nominating deadline. Irrespective of any precedent that may be invoked... it is obvious to me that this decision is based more on its marketing value than making sure that the best films are included. If that were the case, the entire nomination process would have been opened up again to allow The Force Awakens to be considered in all categories. Any suggestion that this decision was made primarily for any reason other than to improve ratings for the awards broadcast feels disingenuous at best. An awards voting body has nothing to stand on but its integrity. I no longer feel my own personal integrity is consistent with ongoing membership in this organization."

— Scott Renshaw,

== Films with multiple nominations and wins ==
The following twenty-six films received multiple nominations:

Film	Nominations
Mad Max: Fury Road	13
Carol	9
The Martian	9
The Revenant	9
Spotlight	8
The Big Short	7
The Hateful Eight	6
Bridge of Spies	5
Brooklyn	5
The Danish Girl	5
Jurassic World	5
Sicario	5
Room	4
Ex Machina	3
Inside Out	3
Joy	3
Mission: Impossible – Rogue Nation	3
Spy	3
Steve Jobs	3
Trainwreck	3
Trumbo	3
Black Mass	2
Furious 7	2
Love & Mercy	2
Sisters	2
Spectre	2

The following five films received multiple awards:

Film	Awards
Mad Max: Fury Road	9
The Big Short	3
Spotlight	3
The Revenant	2
Room	2

== Television programs with multiple nominations and wins ==
The following programs received multiple nominations:

Program	Network	Category	Nominations
Fargo	FX	Limited	8
The Leftovers	HBO	Drama	6
Transparent	Amazon	Comedy	6
The Wiz Live!	NBC	Movie	5
Black-ish	ABC	Comedy	4
Empire	Fox	Drama	4
Mr. Robot	USA	Drama	4
Penny Dreadful	Showtime	Drama	4
American Horror Story: Hotel	FX	Limited	3
Jane the Virgin	The CW	Comedy	3
The Knick	Cinemax	Drama	3
Luther	BBC America	Limited	3
Rectify	Sundance	Drama	3
Saints & Strangers	Nat Geo	Limited	3
Show Me a Hero	HBO	Limited	3
UnREAL	Lifetime	Drama	3
You're the Worst	FXX	Comedy	3
The Amazing Race	CBS	Reality – Competition	2
Chopped	Food Network	Reality – Competition	2
Fresh Off the Boat	ABC	Comedy	2
Getting On	HBO	Comedy	2
The Grinder	Fox	Comedy	2
Hannibal	NBC	Drama	2
Inside the Actors Studio	Bravo	Reality – Structured	2
The Last Man on Earth	Fox	Comedy	2
Master of None	Netflix	Comedy	2
The Middle	ABC	Comedy	2
Mom	CBS	Comedy	2
Nashville	ABC	Drama	2
Survivor	CBS	Reality – Competition	2

The following programs received multiple awards:

Program	Network	Category	Awards
Fargo	FX	Limited	4
Mr. Robot	USA	Drama	3
