= Michael Standish =

- Born: Michael John Standish; London, England
- Occupation: Production designer
- Years active: 1996–present
- Notable work: The Danish Girl

Michael John Standish is a British production designer and set decorator. Best known for his work as set decorator in 2016 The Danish Girl, which earned him his first Academy Award for Best Production Design nomination at 88th Academy Awards along with British production designer Eve Stewart.

== Filmography ==
=== As a production designer ===
- 2012: Zero Dark Thirty (production buyer)
- 2012: John Carter (assistant set decorator)
- 2011: Captain America: The First Avenger (assistant set decorator)
- 2010: The Debt (buyer: London)
- 2010: The Wolfman (assistant set decorator - as Mike Standish)
- 2008: City of Ember (assistant set decorator - as Michael John Standish)
- 2008: The Duchess (production buyer)
- 2005: The Honeymooners (lead person)
- 2004: De-Lovely (production buyer)
- 2002: Nicholas Nickleby (prop buyer)
- 2002: All or Nothing (production buyer - as Mike Standish)
- 2002: About a Boy (production buyer - as Mike Standish)
- 2001: Bridget Jones's Diary (set decorator/buyer: additional photography - as Mike Standish)
- 2000: New Year's Day (production buyer)
- 2000: Sorted (production buyer)
- 2000: Saving Grace (production buyer)
- 1999: Topsy-Turvy (production buyer - as Mike Standish)
- 1998: The Land Girls (assistant buyer)
- 1997: Metroland (buying assistant)

=== As a set decorator ===
- 2016: A Cure for Wellness
- 2015: Victor Frankenstein
- 2015: The Danish Girl
- 2014: Fleming
- 2006: United 93

== Awards ==
- 2015: Academy Award for Best Production Design for The Danish Girl - nominated (Shared with: Eve Stewart)
- 2015: BFCAA Award for Best Art Direction for The Danish Girl - nominated (Shared with: Eve Stewart)

== See also ==
- List of English Academy Award nominees and winners
