= Paco Delgado =

Spanish costume designer

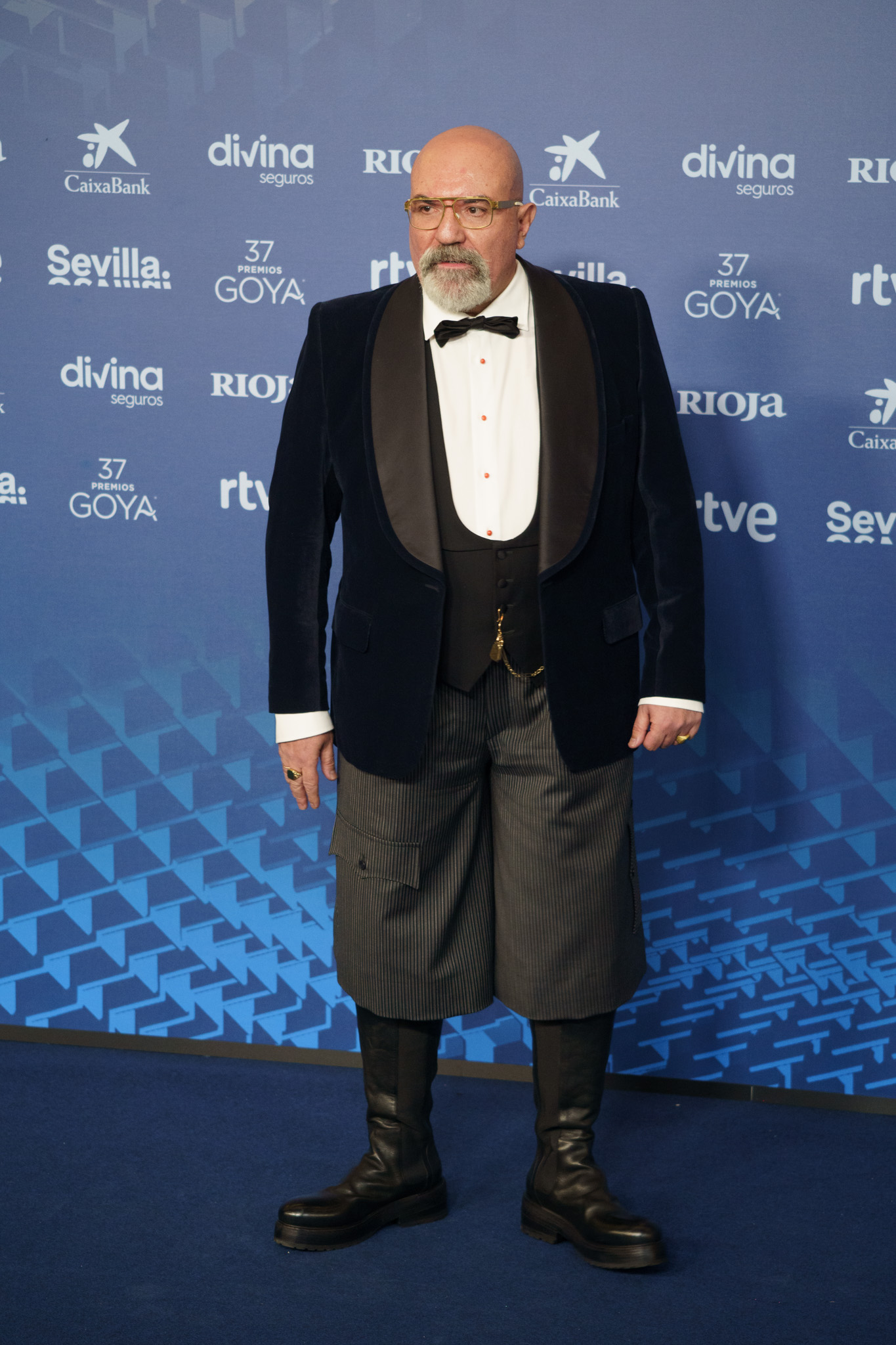
- Born: Francisco Delgado López; 1965 (age 60–61); Arrecife, Spain
- Occupation: Costume designer
- Years active: 1997–present

Francisco "Paco" Delgado López (born 1965) is a Spanish costume designer.

== Life and career ==
Delgado was born in Arrecife, Lanzarote in 1965.

He has won the Goya Award for Best Costume Design twice: for Snow White and for Witching & Bitching, and has received Goya nominations for La comunidad, The Last Circus, The Skin I Live In, and Abracadabra. He earned nominations for the Academy Awards in the category of Best Costume Design twice: at the 85th Academy Awards for the film Les Misérables, and at the 88th Academy Awards for the film The Danish Girl.

== Selected filmography ==
Year	Title	Director
2000	La comunidad	Álex de la Iglesia
2002	800 Bullets	Álex de la Iglesia
2004	Bad Education	Pedro Almodóvar
2004	Crimen Ferpecto (The Ferpect Crime)	Álex de la Iglesia
2005	Queens	Manuel Gómez Pereira
2006	Los aires difíciles	Gerardo Herrero
2007	Guantanamero	Vicente Peñarrocha
2008	The Oxford Murders	Álex de la Iglesia
2008	Sexykiller	Miguel Martí
2010	Una hora más en Canarias	David Serrano
2010	Biutiful	Alejandro González Iñárritu
2010	The Last Circus	Álex de la Iglesia
2011	The Skin I Live In	Pedro Almodóvar
2012	Blancanieves	Pablo Berger
2012	Les Misérables	Tom Hooper
2013	Witching & Bitching	Álex de la Iglesia
2015	The 33	Patricia Riggen
2015	The Danish Girl	Tom Hooper
2016	Grimsby	Louis Leterrier
2017	Split	M. Night Shyamalan
2017	Abracadabra	Pablo Berger
2018	A Wrinkle in Time	Ava DuVernay
2019	Glass	M. Night Shyamalan
2019	Cats	Tom Hooper
2021	Jungle Cruise	Jaume Collet-Serra
2022	Death on the Nile	Kenneth Branagh
2022	The Unbearable Weight of Massive Talent	Tom Gormican
2023	John Wick: Chapter 4	Chad Stahelski
2024	The First Omen	Arkasha Stevenson
2025	G20	Patricia Riggen
