= Pamela L. Caughie =

American academic

Pamela L. Caughie is a professor and graduate program director in the English Department at Loyola University of Chicago. She served as president of Modernist Studies Association from 2009 to 2010. Caughie received her PhD from the University of Virginia in 1987. She is also a highly acclaimed Virginia Woolf scholar, and in 2010 was granted a National Endowment for the Humanities grant of $175,000 to continue her work on an electronic edition of Woolf's To the Lighthouse. Through Loyola University of Chicago's digital humanities center Caughie has worked on a digital archive for Lili Elbe, a well-known figure in transgender history. The website was launched in July 2019.

== Teaching interests ==
Caughie's teaching interests include modern British and American literature, African-American literature and theory, modernism, postmodernism, feminist theory, women's studies and pedagogy.

== Books ==
- Man Into Woman: A Comparative Scholarly Edition, Bloomsbury (February 2020). Co-edited with Sabine Meyer.
- Passing and Pedagogy: The Dynamics of Responsibility, University of Illinois Press (June 29, 1999)
- Virginia Woolf in the Age of Mechanical Reproduction, Routledge (December 1, 1999)

=== Recent publications ===
- "Modernism, Gender and Passing", edited and introduced, in Gender in Modernism: New Geographies; Complex Intersections. General Ed., Bonnie Kime Scott. Urbana: U of Illinois P, 2006.
- "Poststructuralist and Postmodernist Approaches to Virginia Woolf", in The Palgrave Guide to Woolf Studies, Ed. Anna Snaith. New York: Palgrave, 2006.
- "Virginia Woolf, To the Lighthouse", in The Blackwell Companion to Modernist Literature and Culture, Ed. Kevin Dettmar and David Bradshaw. New York: Blackwell Publishing, 2006.
- "Passing as Modernism", in Modernism/modernity 12.3 (September 2005): 385-406.
- "Professional Identity Politics", in Feminist Studies 29 (Winter 2003).
- "Teaching 'Woman': A Cultural Criticism Approach to Teaching D. H. Lawrence", in Approaches to Teaching D. H. Lawrence, Ed. Elizabeth Sargent and Garry Watson. New York: MLA, 2001.
- "Returning to the Lighthouse: A Postmodern Approach", in Approaches to Teaching Woolf's "To the Lighthouse", Ed. Beth Rigel Daugherty and Mary Beth Pringle. New York: MLA, 2001: 47-53.
