= Henry Stenning =

English socialist and translator

Henry James Stenning (1889–1971), known in print as H. J. Stenning and also known as Harry Stenning, was an English socialist and translator.

== Life ==
Born in Westminster, Stenning left school aged thirteen and a half. He joined the Social Democratic Federation in 1906, aged sixteen, and was a peace campaigner during World War I. He later joined the ILP, working at the ILP bakery in Bermondsey after the war. In 1920 he criticised Bolshevism as 'a recrudescence of Blanquism' in an article for Labour Leader, and published a translation of Karl Kautsky's The Dictatorship of the Proletariat. He also worked as a publisher's reader, and from 1925 ran a law stationers' business in the City of London.

== Works ==
=== Translations ===
- The dictatorship of the proletariat by Karl Kautsky. Manchester: National Labour Press, [1918]
- The manifesto of the Moscow International, signed by Lenin, Trotsky, Platten, Zinoviev, and Rakovsky. Manchester: National Labour Press, [1919]
- The march towards socialism by Edgard Milhaud. London: Leonard Parsons, 1920.
- (tr. with T. C. Partington) The life and teaching of Karl Marx by Max Beer. London, Manchester: National Labour Press, 1921.
- Georgia: a social-democratic peasant republic. Impressions and observations by Karl Kautsky. London: International Bookshops, [1921].
- Social struggles in antiquity by Max Beer. London: Leonard Parsons, 1922.
- Socialisation in theory and practice by Heinrich Ströbel. London: P. S. King, 1922.
- The German revolution and after by Heinrich Ströbel. London: Jarrolds, [1923].
- The isles of wisdom by Alexander Moszkowski. London: G. Routledge & Sons, 1924.
- Social struggles in the Middle Ages by Max Beer. London: L. Parsons, 1924.
- Social struggles and socialist forerunners by Max Beer. London: L. Parsons, [1924].
- The art of the theatre by Sarah Bernhardt. Translated from the French. London: Geoffrey Bles, [1924].
- Samuel Pepys: a portrait in miniature by Jean Lucas-Dubreton. London: A. M. Philpot, ltd., [1924?].
- The labour revolution by Karl Kautsky. London: Allen & Unwin, 1925.
- The Anglo-Russian Report : A Criticism of the Report of the British Trades Union Delegation to Russia, from the Point of View of International Socialism by Friedrich Adler. London: P. S. King & Son, ltd, 1925.
- The Austrian Revolution by Otto Bauer. London: L. Parsons, 1925.
- Social Struggles and Thought (1750–1860) by Max Beer. London: L. Parsons, [1925].
- The economic doctrines of Karl Marx by Karl Kautsky. London: A. & C. Black, Ltd, 1925.
- Vienna under socialist rule by Robert Danneberg. London: Labour Party, [1925].
- Selected essays by Karl Marx. London: Leonard Parsons, 1926.
- Thomas More and his Utopia: with a historical introduction by Karl Kautsky. New York: International Publishers, 1927.
- Cromwell & communism: socialism and democracy in the great English revolution by Eduard Bernstein. London: G. Allen & Unwin, 1930.
- In defence of capitalism by Adolf Weber. London: G. Allen & Unwin, 1930.
- The experiment of Bolshevism by Arthur Feiler. London: G. Allen & Unwin, 1930; Arthur Feiler (1930). The Russian Experiment. New York: Harcourt, Brace and Company – via Internet Archive.
- Before Jutland: Admiral von Spee's last voyage; Coronel & the battle of the Falklands by Captain Hans Pochhammer. London: Jarrolds Limited, 1931.
- The call of the North by H. H. Houben. London: E. Mathews & Marrot, 1932..
- Jovial King. Napoleon's youngest brother by Friedrich Max Kircheisen. London: E. Mathews & Marrot, 1932.
- Fighting the French in Morocco by Albert Bartels. London: Alston Rivers, 1932.
- Kings in exile by Otto Ernst. London: Jarrolds, 1933.
- The resurrection of the dead by Karl Barth. London: Hodder & Stoughton, 1933.
- Man into Woman: An Authentic Record of a Change of Sex. The true story of the miraculous transformation of the Danish painter Einar Wegener-Andreas Sparre by Niels Hoyer. London: Jarrolds, 1933.
- Creation's doom by Desiderius Papp. London: Jarrolds, 1934.
- Germany's secret armaments by Helmut Klotz. London: Jarrolds, 1934.
- Life and death: the autobiography of a surgeon by Andrea Majocchi. London: G. Allen & Unwin, 1937.
- Tariff levels and the economic unity of Europe: an examination of tariff policy, export movements and the economic integration of Europe, 1913–1931 by Heinrich Liepman. London: G. Allen & Unwin.
- Maginot of the line by Pierre Belperron. London: Williams and Norgate, 1940.
- Paul Gauguin: letters to his wife and friends, ed. Maurice Malingue. London: Saturn Press, [1948].
- Tragic Empress. The story of Elizabeth of Austria by Maurice Paléologue. London: Saturn Press, [1950].
- London by Jacques Boussard. London; printed in France: Nicholas Kaye, 1951.
- Venus in Furs. Together with the Back Czarina by Leopold von Sacher-Masoch. London: Luxor Press, [1965].
- Practical handicraft: I. Working in metal, leather, clay and other media by Prof. Fritz Walter. London: Mills & Boon, 1967.

=== Other ===
- 'Socialist Unity', Socialist Review, 12, (April 1914), pp. 157–64
- (ed. with intro.) The causes of war by W. R. Inge, Lord Beaverbrook and others. London: Allen & Unwin, 1935.
