= Adolf Weber (economist) =

German economist (1876–1963)

Adolf Weber (29 December 1876 – 5 January 1963) was a German economist.

== Life ==
Adolf Weber was born in Mechernich in the Rhine Province near Bonn. He was professor at the University of Cologne, the University of Breslau, the University of Frankfurt am Main and the Ludwig-Maximilians-Universität München. Weber was a friend of Ludwig von Mises, and broadly associated with the Austrian School. He criticised the economic policy of Reichsbank president Hjalmar Schacht in an article 'Is Schacht right?'

== Works ==
- Depositenbanken und Spekulationsbanken : ein Vergleich deutschen und englischen Bankwesens, 1902.
- Der Kampf zwischen Kapital und Arbeit; Gewerkschaften und Arbeitgeberverbände in Deutschland, 1920
- Allgemeine Volkswirtschaftslehre: eine Einführung, 1928.
- In defence of capitalism, 1930. Translated by H. J. Stenning from the German Ende des Kapitalismus.
- Geld, Banken, Börsen, 1939.
- Deutsches wirtschaftsleben, 1941
- Kurzgefasste Volkswirtschaftspolitik, 1942.
- Die neue Weltwirtschaft, 1947.
- Marktwirtschaft und Sowjetwirtschaft; ein Vergleich, 1949.
- Sowjetwirtschaft und Weltwirtschaft, 1959
