= Fra Mand til Kvinde =

1931 Danish book about Lili Elbe

Fra Mand til Kvinde: Lili Elbes Bekendelser
- Author: Lili Elbe
- Language: Danish
- Genre: Autobiography
- Publisher: Hage & Clausens Forlag
- Publication date: 1931
- Publication place: Denmark

Fra Mand til Kvinde: Lili Elbes Bekendelser (lit. 'From Man to Woman: Lili Elbe's Confessions') is a 1931 autobiography by Danish artist Lili Elbe. Published in Copenhagen by Hage & Clausens Forlag, it was later translated and adapted into German and English editions, including the 1933 book Man into Woman: An Authentic Record of a Change of Sex.

== Publication ==
Fra Mand til Kvinde was published in Copenhagen in 1931, approximately three months after Elbe's death in Dresden in September of that year. It was a collaboration involving Elbe and her wife, Gerda Wegener, their friend Poul Knudsen, journalist Loulou Lassen, German writer and editor Ernst Harthern, physician Kurt Warnekros, and the publishing house Hage & Clausens Forlag.

Although the book was presented as Elbe's own work, its precise authorship is complicated. Its narrative is written in the third person and the German typescript from which the published versions ultimately derive identifies "Niels Hoyer", a pseudonym used by Ernst Harthern, as the author. The Danish edition itself does not name Hoyer on its title page, while the later German edition identifies Elbe as the author and Hoyer as editor.

== Content ==
The narrative recounts Elbe's life. It discusses her gender transition, her marriage to artist Gerda Wegener, her life as an artist, and the gender-affirmative medical procedures she underwent in Germany.

The first edition contains two photographs. One depicts Elbe pre-transition, while another depicts Lili Elbe reading in the garden of the women's clinic in Dresden.

== Later editions ==
A German version, Ein Mensch wechselt sein Geschlecht: Eine Lebensbeichte (lit. 'A Person Changes Sex: A Life Confession'), was published in Dresden by Carl Reissner Verlag in 1932. It was a different editing of the German typescript from the Danish version. The German edition placed "Lili Elbe" above the title and credited "Niels Hoyer" as editor of her papers.

The English translation, Man into Woman: An Authentic Record of a Change of Sex, appeared in British and American editions in 1933. Both English editions were translated from the German version rather than directly from the Danish original and included an introduction by British sexologist Norman Haire.

The differences between the Danish, German and English texts are discussed in Pamela L. Caughie and Sabine Meyer's 2020 work, Man Into Woman: A Comparative Scholarly Edition.
