= Gerda Wegener =

Danish artist (1886–1940)

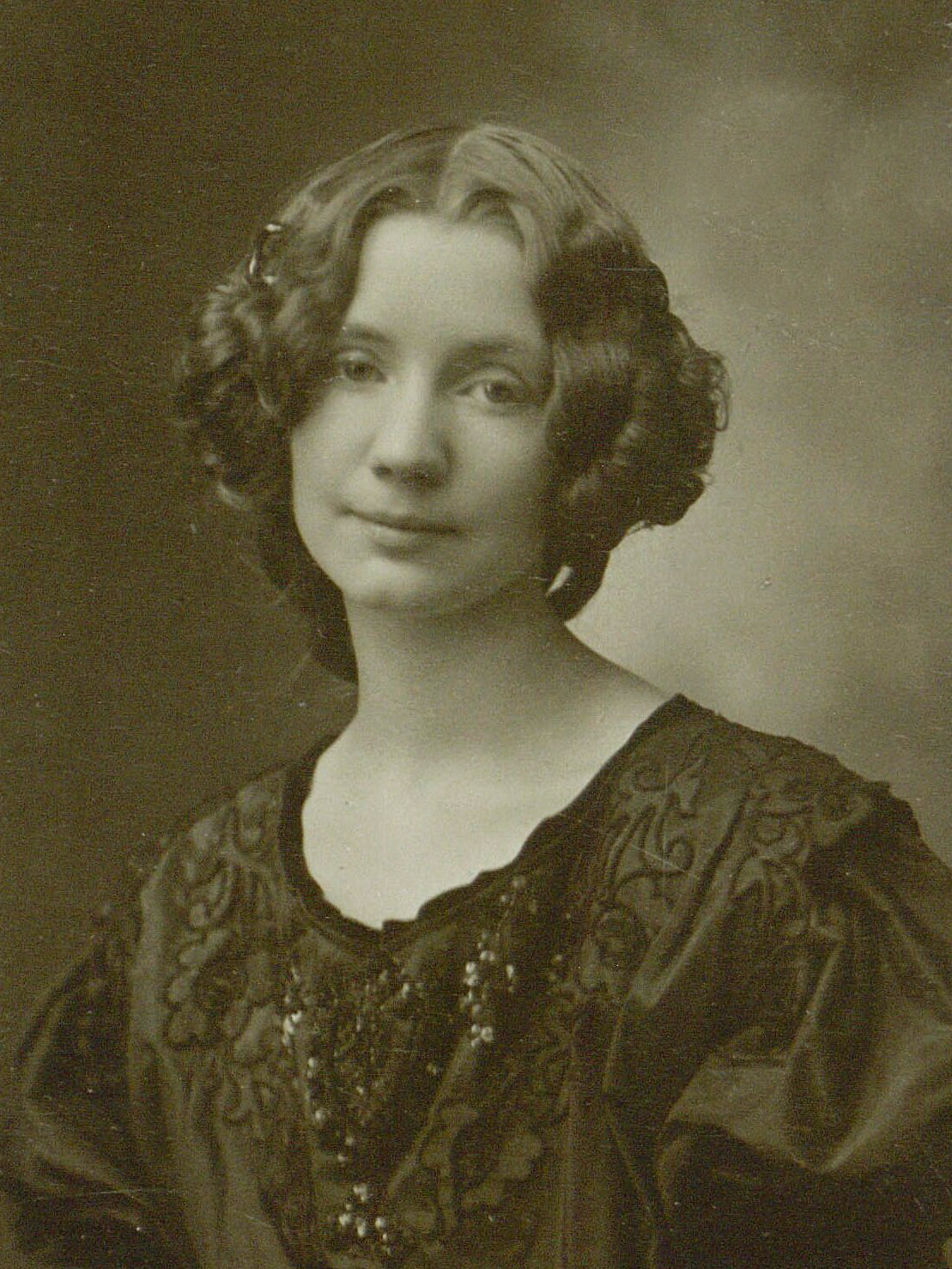
- Wegener in 1904
- Born: Gerda Marie Frederikke Gottlieb; 15 March 1885; Hammelev, Denmark
- Died: 28 July 1940 (aged 55); Frederiksberg, Denmark
- Occupations: Artist, illustrator, painter
- Spouses: Lili Ilse Elvenes (née Wegener) (m. 1904; annul. 1930) Fernando Porta (m. 1931; div. 1936)

Gerda Marie Fredrikke Wegener (née Gottlieb; 15 March 1885 – 28 July 1940) was a Danish illustrator and painter. Wegener is known for her fashion illustrations and later her paintings that pushed the boundaries of her time concerning gender and love. These works were classified as lesbian erotica at times and many were inspired by her partner, transgender painter Lili Elbe. Wegener employed these works in the styles of Art Nouveau and later Art Deco.

Gerda Wegener also drew a few comics.

== Early life ==
Gottlieb was born in Hammelev, Denmark to Justine (née Østerberg) and Emil Gottlieb, a vicar in the Lutheran church. She was raised in a conservative milieu. She had three siblings but was the only child to live to adulthood. Her family moved to Hobro and later she moved to Copenhagen to pursue her education at the Royal Danish Academy of Fine Arts.

== Styles and influences ==
Wegener's work was often of confident and elegant women performing a variety of activities in either a Renaissance inspired style, Art Nouveau or Art Deco style. The images tended to show women posing or participating in artistic endeavors such as theatre, literature, and dance. Later on in France, Wegener created work showing women displaying seductive power or engaging in sexual activities. This risqué art was considered "lesbian erotica" and published in illicit art books.

Along with shifting how women are represented in art, Wegener also challenged gender and sex identity roles in her work. She did this in small ways, such as drawing men with slender bodies and soft lines, or by painting her transgender partner, Lili Elbe.

== Career ==
=== Early career ===
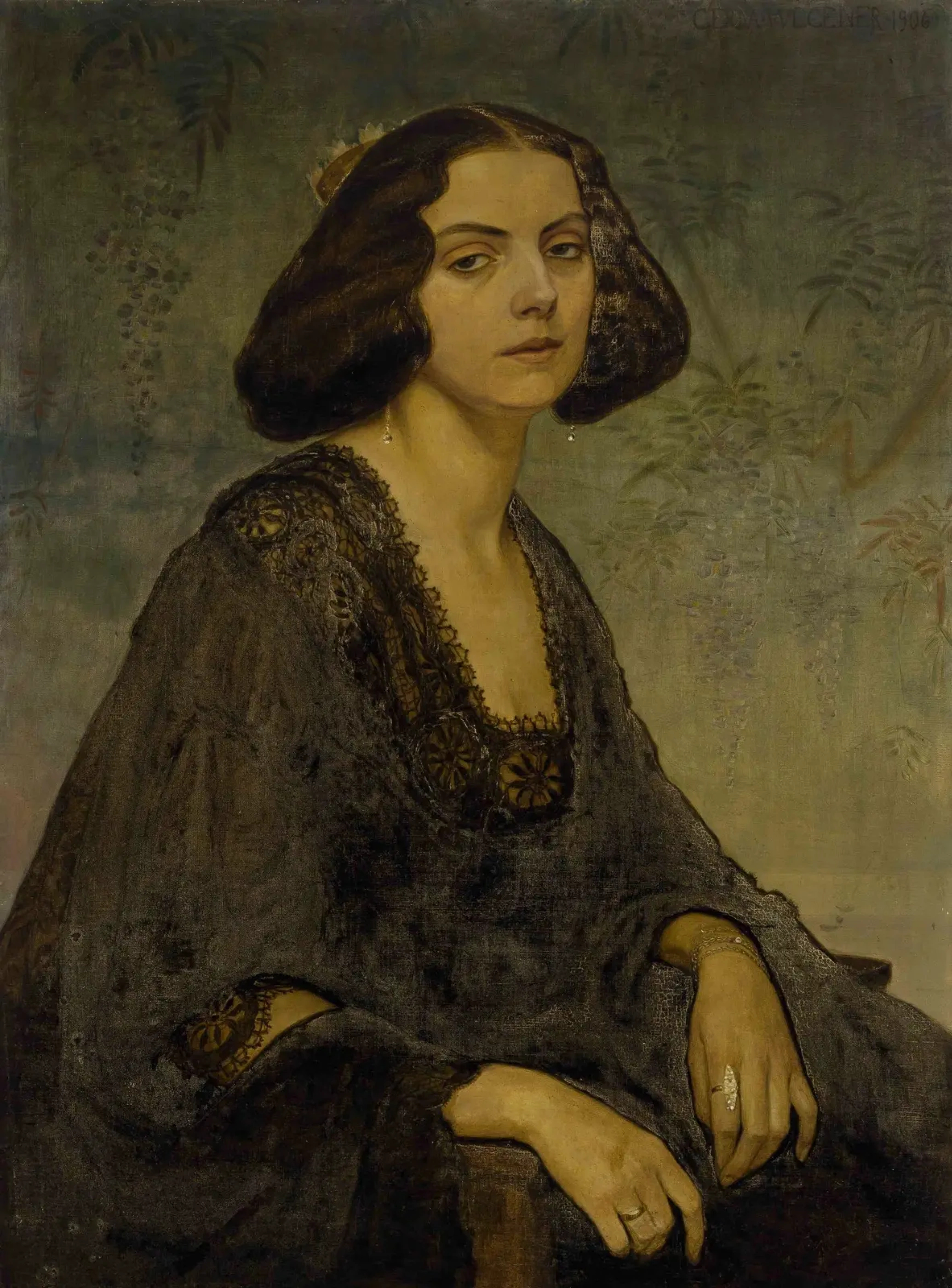
Portrait of Ellen von Kohl (1906)

Gottlieb's work was shown in the Charlottenborg Art Gallery in 1904, but she gained little attention for her artwork. Her career as an artist began to mobilize after graduating from the Academy in 1907 and 1908 when she made appearances in the Politiken newspaper. She then was the center of a controversy called the Peasant Painter Dispute after one of her 1906 works, Portrait of Ellen von Kohl, was rejected from the exhibitions of Den frie Udstilling and Charlottenborg due to the style of the piece. This piece caused concerns of Italian Renaissance plagiarism and split opinions of it showing a weak individual or an elegant beautiful woman. Gottlieb never became involved in the debate. The portrait was displayed by the Winkel and Magnussen's art dealership and received attention that boosted her career as an artist.

=== Copenhagen, Denmark ===
Wegener won two sketching competitions in the Politiken newspaper. One was in 1908 and another in 1909 for best capturing "Copenhagen Women" and then "The figures of the Street." Wegener was known for her illustrations created for advertisements and was also a portrait painter. She did art in Paris, but was less successful in Denmark, where people found her work very different and strange as it often portrayed her husband as a woman.

=== Paris, France ===
In 1912, Wegener and her partner, Lili Elbe, moved to Paris, France. In Paris, Wegener began to push the boundaries in her artwork by creating more provocative paintings of women engaged in sexual activities and seductive positions. She often painted herself with Lili Elbe or Lili alone either portrayed as a man or a woman. Her work gained her attention and she was able to throw parties and experience notorious fame. Along with this, her work in the fashion industry took off as she illustrated for magazines such as La Baïonnette, Fantasio, Vogue, and La Vie Parisienne. Her illustrations were used in a wide range of platforms from beauty advertisements to political anti-German images in the Le Matin and the La Baïonnette during World War II. In 1925, she won two gold medals and a bronze one for her artwork in competition at the 1925 World's Fair in Paris. She was exhibited in the Salon des Humoristes, the Salon des Indépendants, and the Salon d’Automne. She befriended Ulla Poulsen (1905–2001), a Danish ballerina, who became a frequent model for her paintings. She and her spouse were also close friends with artist Rudolph Tegner and his wife Elna.

== Personal life ==
=== Lili Elbe ===
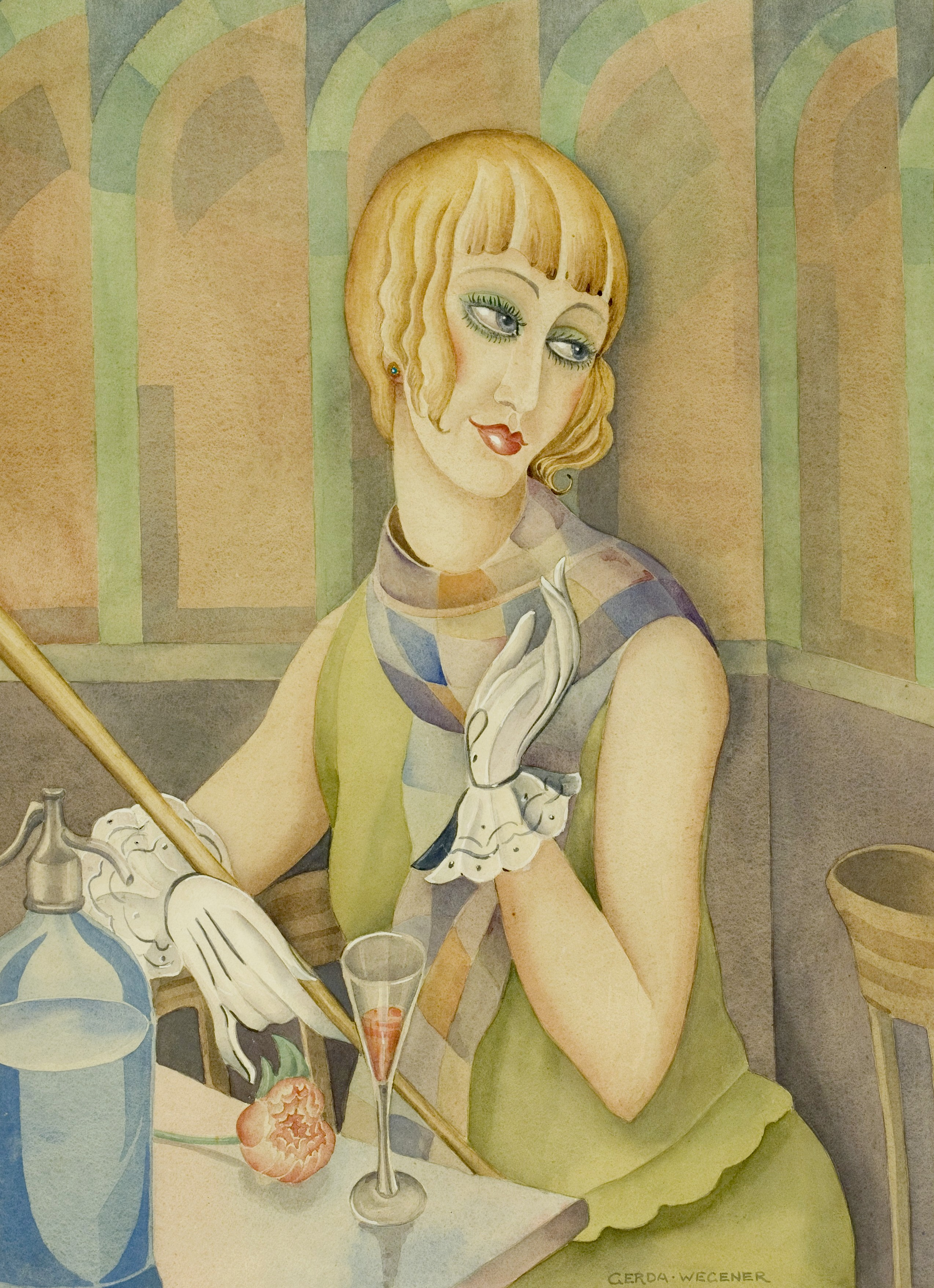
Lili Elbe by Gerda Wegener, c. 1928

She met fellow artist Lili Elbe at art school. They married in 1904, when Gerda was 19 and Lili, then known as Einar Wegener, was 22. They travelled through Italy and France, eventually settling in Paris in 1912. The couple immersed themselves in the Bohemian lifestyle of the time, befriending many artists, dancers and other figures from the artistic world, often attending carnivals and other public festivals.

During this time Elbe began to wear female clothing, and adopted her female name and persona, becoming Gerda Wegener's favourite model, in paintings of beautiful women with haunting almond-shaped eyes dressed in chic fashions. In 1913, the art world was shocked when they learned that the model who had inspired her depictions of petite femmes fatales was in fact her "husband".

As Elbe adopted her female identity, Gerda Wegener commonly introduced her as Einar Wegener's cousin when she was dressed in female attire. In 1930 Elbe underwent one of the first sex reassignment surgeries. As Danish law at the time did not recognize marriage between two women, their marriage was annulled in October 1930 by King Christian X. Elbe died in 1931 from complications of the surgery.

=== Later life and death ===
In 1931, Wegener married Italian officer, aviator, and diplomat Major Fernando Porta and moved with him to Morocco. She divorced him in 1936 and returned to Denmark in 1938 for unknown reasons. Wegener held her last exhibition in 1939, but by this time, her artwork was out of style as the simpler Functionalism had become more popular in the 1930s. She had no children, lived by herself in relative obscurity, and began to drink heavily. She faced financial instability and kept an income by selling hand-painted postcards.

She died on 28 July 1940, in Frederiksberg, Denmark, shortly after Nazi Germany invaded the country. Her small estate was auctioned, and there was only a small obituary printed in the local paper.

== Book and film ==
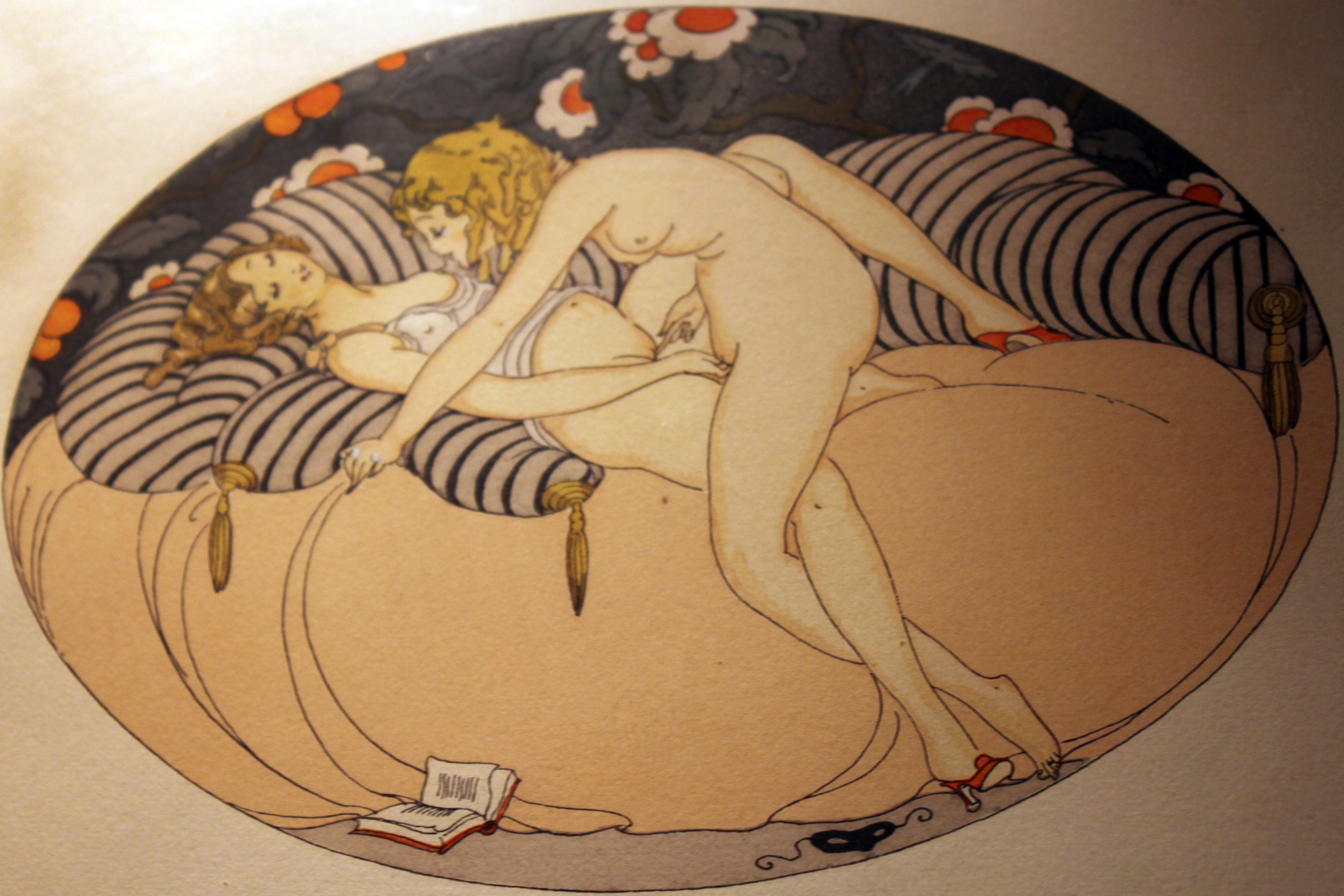
A 1925 Gerda Wegener painting of two women engaged in sexual activity in bed.

Over the years, beginning with the literary success of a book about her and Elbe's life together, and further with the release of a movie based on the book, the story of the couple gained a cult following in Denmark and around the world. Their artwork has been rediscovered, and exhibited and auctioned with success. A special exhibition of Gerda Wegener's work was on display at the Arken Museum of Modern Art until January 2017, followed by a travelling exhibit of her art shown around the world.

The Danish Girl, David Ebershoff's 2000 novel about Gerda and Lili, was an international best-seller and was translated into a dozen languages. Gerda Wegener is portrayed by Swedish actress Alicia Vikander in the 2015 film The Danish Girl, also starring British actor Eddie Redmayne as Lili Elbe. The film received some criticism for obscuring the actual story of a historical trans person and omitting certain facts and for being based on a fictional book that does not tell the true story of the couple. The topic of Gerda Wegener's own sexuality, which she never talked about publicly, is not mentioned in the film or book.

== Select works illustrated by Wegener ==
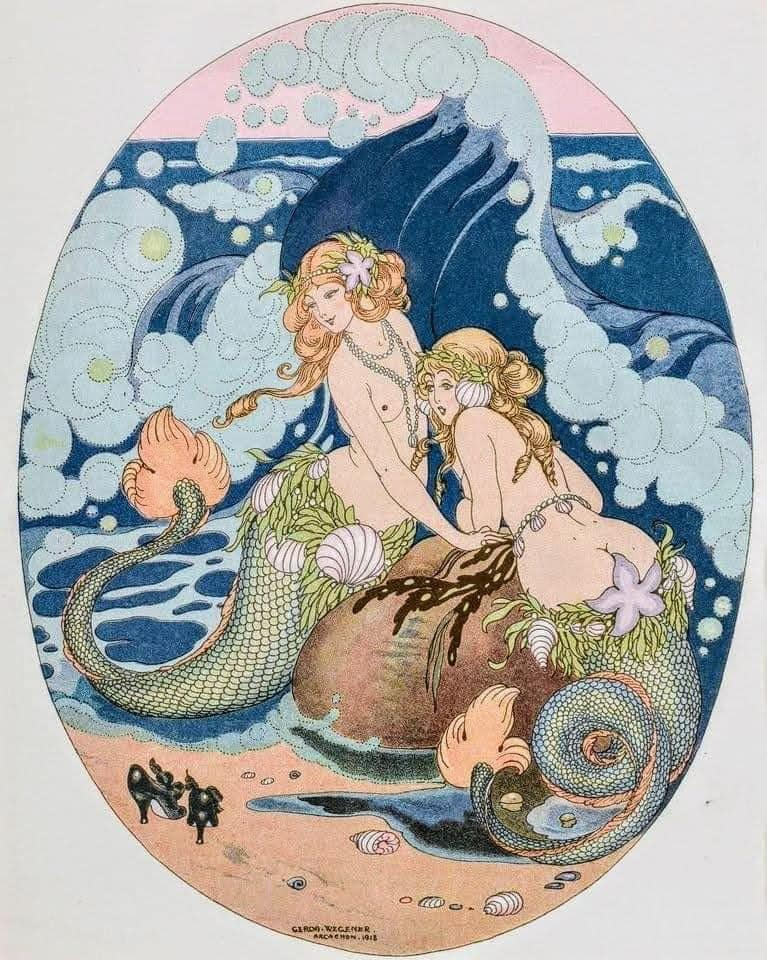
Two Mermaids, 1918

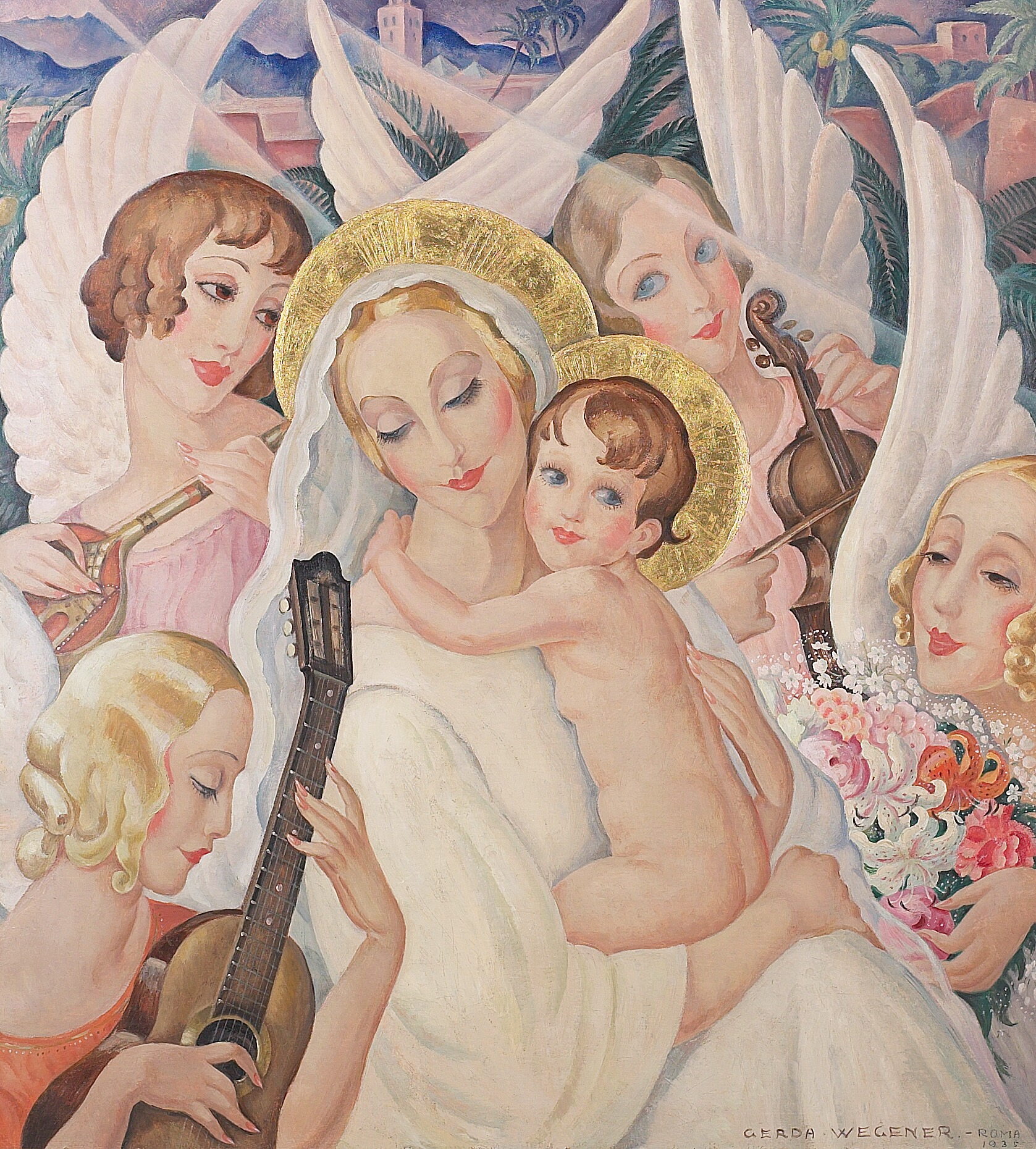
Madonna and Child, surrounded by musical angels, 1935

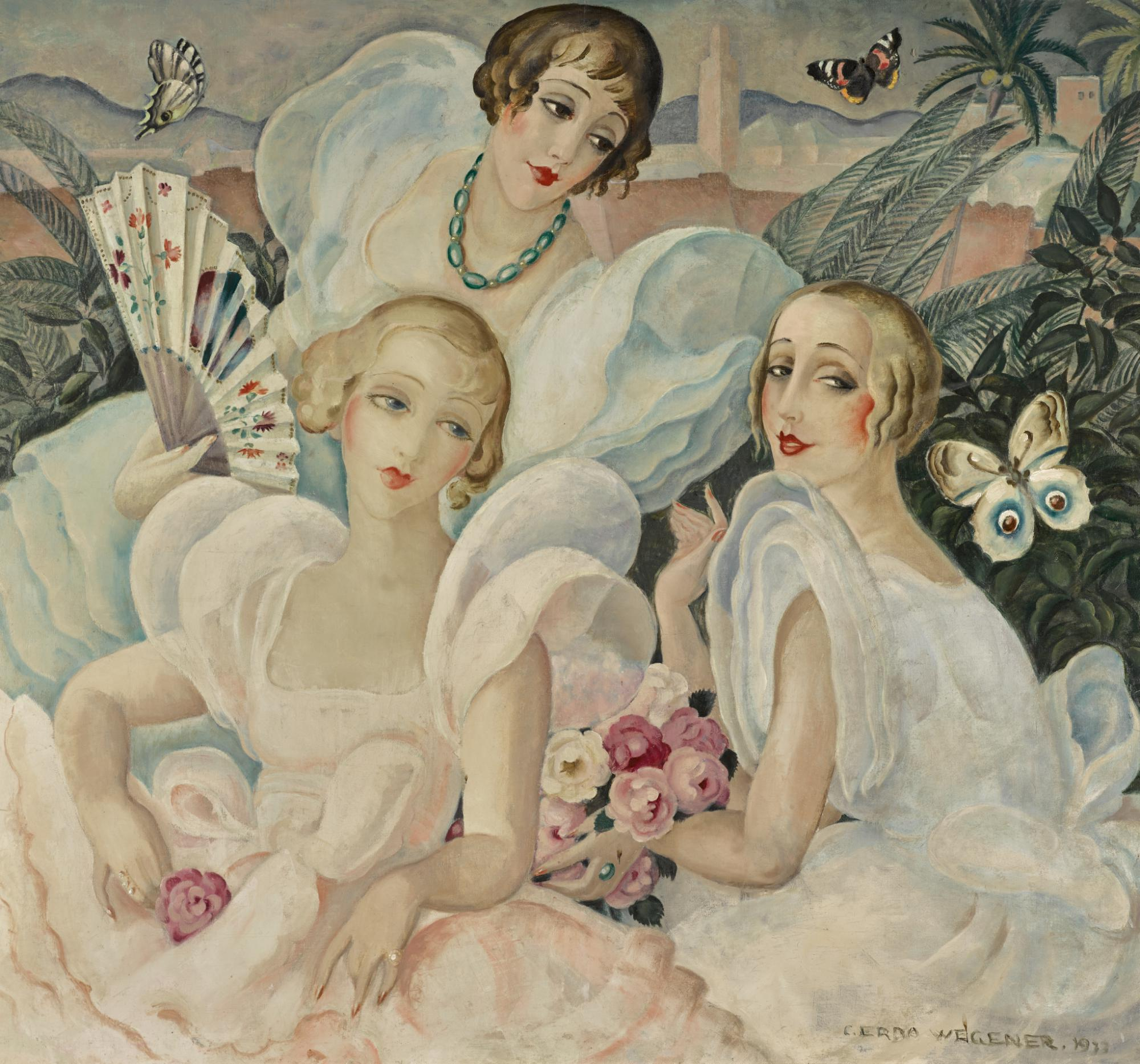
Les femmes fatales

- Den skønne Ubekendte by Andreas Winding (1912)
- L'Anneau ou La Jeune fille imprudente by Louis de Robert (1913)
- Amour Etrusque by J.-H. Rosny aîné (1914)
- Les Aventures amoureuses d'Eustache Leroussin by Daniel Barrias (1914)
- Le Journal de Marinette by une Femme curieuse (1914)
- Le Peplos vert by Maurice de Waleffe (1915)
- Les Colombes poignardées by Maurice Magre (1917)
- La Guerre est morte by Louis Delluc (1917)
- La Petite faunesse by Charles Derennes (1918)
- La Tendre Camarade by Maurice Magre (1918)
- L'Abdication de Ris-Orangis by Léo Larguier (1918)
- Contes de mon Père le Jars by Eric Allatini (1919)
- Le Parfait Suiveur by Maurice Magre (1919)
- Le Livre des vikings by Charles Guyot (1924)
- Douze sonnets lascifs by Louis Perceau (1925) - accompanied by the suite of aquarelles Les Délassements d'Éros
- Une Aventure d'amour à Venise by Giacomo Casanova (1927)
- La Mythologie (1928) - album of twelve plates
- Les Contes by La Fontaine (1928–1929)
- Sur Talons rouges by Eric Allatini (1929)
- l'Œuvre du Divin Arétin (1930–1931) - suite of twelve color engravings
- Fortunio by Théophile Gautier (1934)

== Literature ==
- Elbe, Lili (1933) [1931]. Hoyer, Niels (ed.). Man into Woman: An Authentic Record of a Change of Sex. Translated by Stenning, H.J. Introduction by Norman Haire. London: Jarrold Publishers. Editor Niels Hoyer is a pseudonym for E. Harthern. Originally published in Danish as Fra mand til kvinde.
  - Elbe, Lili (2004). Man into Woman: The First Sex Change, a Portrait of Lili Elbe—The True and Remarkable Transformation of the Painter Einar Wegener. London: Blue Boat Books.
- Gether, Christian; Høholt, Stine; Karberg, Andrea Rygg; Martinussen, Amalie Grubb, eds. (2015). Gerda Wegener. Denmark: Arken Museum of Modern Art. ISBN 978-87-7875-112-6.
