= Loulou Lassen =

Danish journalist (1876–1948)

Louise "Loulou" Lassen (20 September 1876 – 9 May 1947), born Louise Marcussen was a Danish journalist, writer and translator. Being employed as the correspondent of the Dannebrog from 1899 to 1910 and the Politiken later, she has been referred to as the first Danish woman to work as a career journalist and reporter on equal terms with her male colleagues.

== Early life ==
Louise Marcussen was born in to Paul Marcussen and Rose Trier, a francophile, cultured family, with her grandmother being sister of Tivoli's founder Georg Carstensen. She was first home-schooled, and then after taking the general preparatory exam in 1892, she traveled to France to pursue language and literature studies. After her mother's death in 1898, she became a caretaker of her siblings, responsible for their education.

== Career ==
=== Journalism ===
When Lassen was in Paris in 1899, a mining accident in Northern France happened. Lassen called the newspaper Dannebrog and asked, if they wanted a report. The newspaper agreed and hired her based on her reporting of the accident. While Dannebrog was initially a Venstre party organ, and women would only work on fashion and "women's topics", Lassen worked in several areas, gaining contacts with sources and journalistic experience. Following the 1908 Peter Adler Alberti scandal, Dannebrog closed in 1910, and this was when Henrik Cavling, editor in chief of rival Politiken, poached Lassen. She again covered various topics, and during World War I she managed the newspaper's "telegram hall" with war reports and news. Cavling also discovered Lassen's talent in medical journalism and presenting complex medical ideas to laypeople, with her eventually gaining trust of the medical experts. She used the pen name Fru Loulou (lit. 'Mrs. Loulou').

One of the cases Lassen reported for Politiken was gender transition of Lili Ilse Elvenes. In February 1931 Politiken published Lassen's interview with Elvenes, where the name Lili Elbe was used for the first time ever in print. Lassen later reported on Elbe's death and was one of six people responsible for assembling and publishing Elbe's memoir, Fra Mand til Kvinde.

Lassen was also responsible for "lighter" city news about Copenhagen, which were printed in the column Dag til Dag. Lassen was severely ill in her last years of live, but she continued to work in the editorial office until her death.

=== Fiction ===
Lassen published a book Det evigt Kvindelige (lit. 'The Eternal Woman') in 1902, under maiden name Marcussen. She translated several plays and the complete works of Guy de Maupassant, published in 28 volumes between 1903 and 1912. Together with Esther Scheel and Astrid Stoumann, she published the three-volume work Haandbog for Nutidshjem between 1937 and 1938.

== Personal life ==
Louise married fellow journalist Alfred Lassen on 2 January 1904. She also owned the Copenhagen property Klosterstræde 8 since at least the 1900s.
