= Friedrich Max Kircheisen =

German historian (1877–1933)

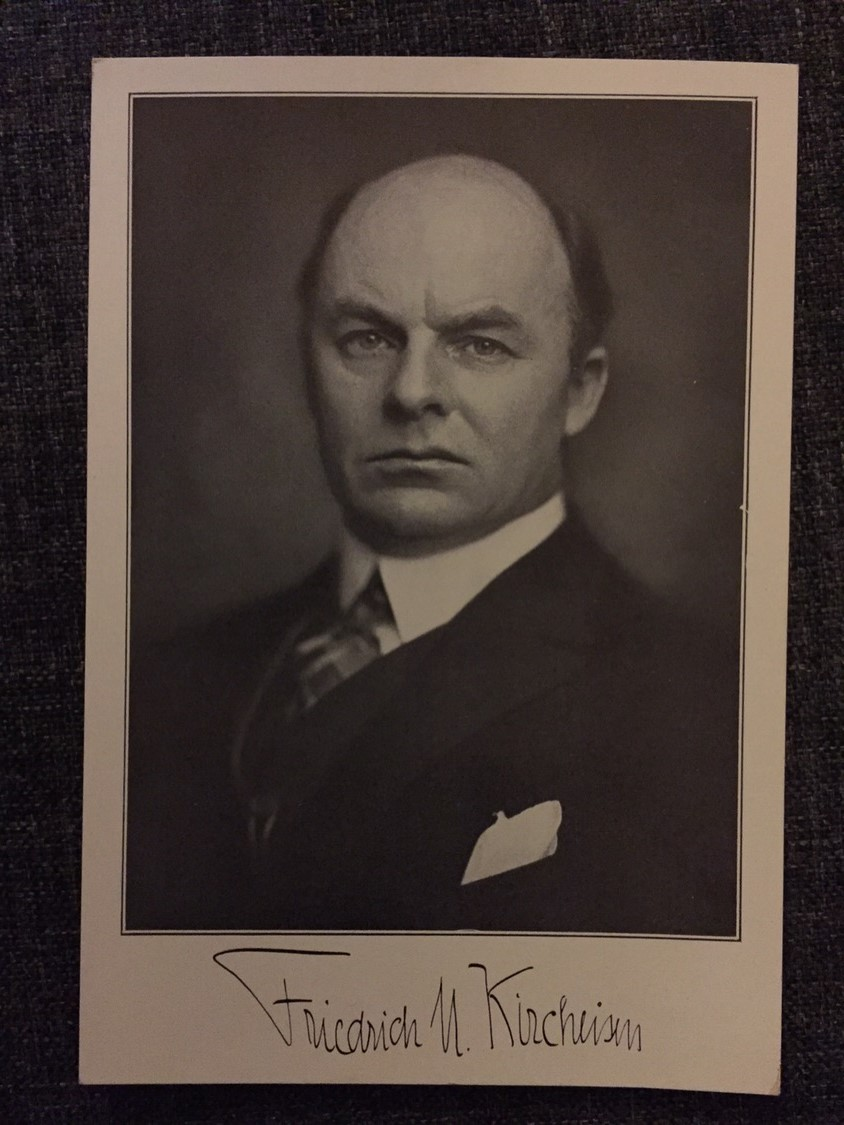
Friedrich Max Kircheisen

Friedrich Max Kircheisen (23 June 1877 – 12 February 1933) was a German historian, born at Chemnitz. He studied history and international law at the Universities of Leipzig and Paris and specialized in the Napoleonic era.

== Works ==
- Bibliography of Napoleon (1902) – A systematic collection critically selected
- Die Schriften von und über Friedrich von Gentz (1906) – The writings of and about Friedrich von Gentz.
- Napoleon: Auswahl aus Seinen Aussprüchen (1907) – Napoleon, selection of his sayings.
- Memoiren aus dem Spanischen Freiheitskampfe (1908) – Memoirs of the Spanish struggle for freedom 1808–1811.
- Auswahl aus J. J. Rousseau Briefen 1908) – Selection of Jean-Jacques Rousseau's letters.
- Hat Napoleon Gelebt? Und andere kuriose Geschichten (1910).
- Gedichte (1913) – Poetry; edition of Max von Schenkendorf.
- Napoleon, Sein Leben und Seine Zeit (1914) – Napoleon, his life and times.
- Die Schlacht an der Marne (1915) – The Battle of the Marne.
- Napoleon im Lande der Pyramiden (1918) – Napoleon in the land of the pyramids.
- Memoires Of Napoleon I (1927) – Compiled from his own writings
- Napoleon (1932) – Translation of Napoleon I: ein Lebensbild
- Jovial King: Napoleon's Youngest Brother (1932) – Jerome Bonaparte, translated by H. J. Stenning
