= Man into Woman =

1933 book about Lili Elbe

- Editor: Niels Hoyer
- Author: Lili Elbe
- Translator: H. J. Stenning
- Language: English
- Subject: Lili Elbe
- Publisher: Jarrolds
- Publication date: 1933
- Pages: 287

Man into Woman: An Authentic Record of a Change of Sex is a 1933 English-language book about the life of Danish artist Lili Elbe, published under the editorial name Niels Hoyer. Hoyer was the pseudonym of Ernst Harthern. The English edition was translated from German by H. J. Stenning and included an introduction by British sexologist Norman Haire. It was published in London by Jarrolds and simultaneously in New York by E. P. Dutton.

== Publication history ==
The narrative was first published in Copenhagen in 1931 under the Danish title Fra Mand til Kvinde: Lili Elbes Bekendelser (From Man to Woman: Lili Elbe's Confessions). The Danish edition was derived from a German typescript prepared after Elbe's death in September 1931. A German edition, Ein Mensch wechselt sein Geschlecht: Eine Lebensbeichte, was published in Dresden in 1932. The German edition identifies Lili Elbe as the author and Niels Hoyer as the editor of her papers.

Two English-language editions appeared in 1933, one in Britain and one in the United States. The British edition was published by Jarrolds in London, while the American edition was published by E. P. Dutton in New York. Both used the title Man into Woman: An Authentic Record of a Change of Sex and were translated from the German edition by H. J. Stenning. Both also included an introduction by Norman Haire.

== Content ==
The book recounts Elbe's life and her gender transition. It describes her relationship with her wife, artist Gerda Wegener, and her experiences in connection with the gender-affirmative surgical procedures she underwent in Germany beginning in 1930.

The narrative is presented as an account of Elbe's experiences, but its production involved several people and multiple stages of editing. The surviving German typescript bears the title Lili Elbe Buch von Niels Hoyer and was completed several months after Elbe's death. The subsequent Danish, German and English editions contain significant textual differences.

== Authorship and editorial history ==
"Niels Hoyer" was a pseudonym of Ernst Harthern, whom the English editions identify as the editor.

== Historical significance ==
Caughie and Meyer describe the original 1931 work as the first popular full-length autobiography concerning a person who underwent gender-affirming surgery. Timothy Armstrong examined its relationship to contemporary anthropology and sexology, while the 2020 Caughie amd Meyer scholarly edition discussed it in the context of modernist literature and transgender studies.

== Scholarly editions ==
In 2020, Pamela L. Caughie and Sabine Meyer edited Man Into Woman: A Comparative Scholarly Edition, published by Bloomsbury Academic. The edition reproduces the complete text of the 1933 American edition and provides notes comparing textual and paratextual differences among four editions published in Danish, German and English between 1931 and 1933.
