= Klosterstræde 8 =

Listed building in Copenhagen

Kosterstræde 8
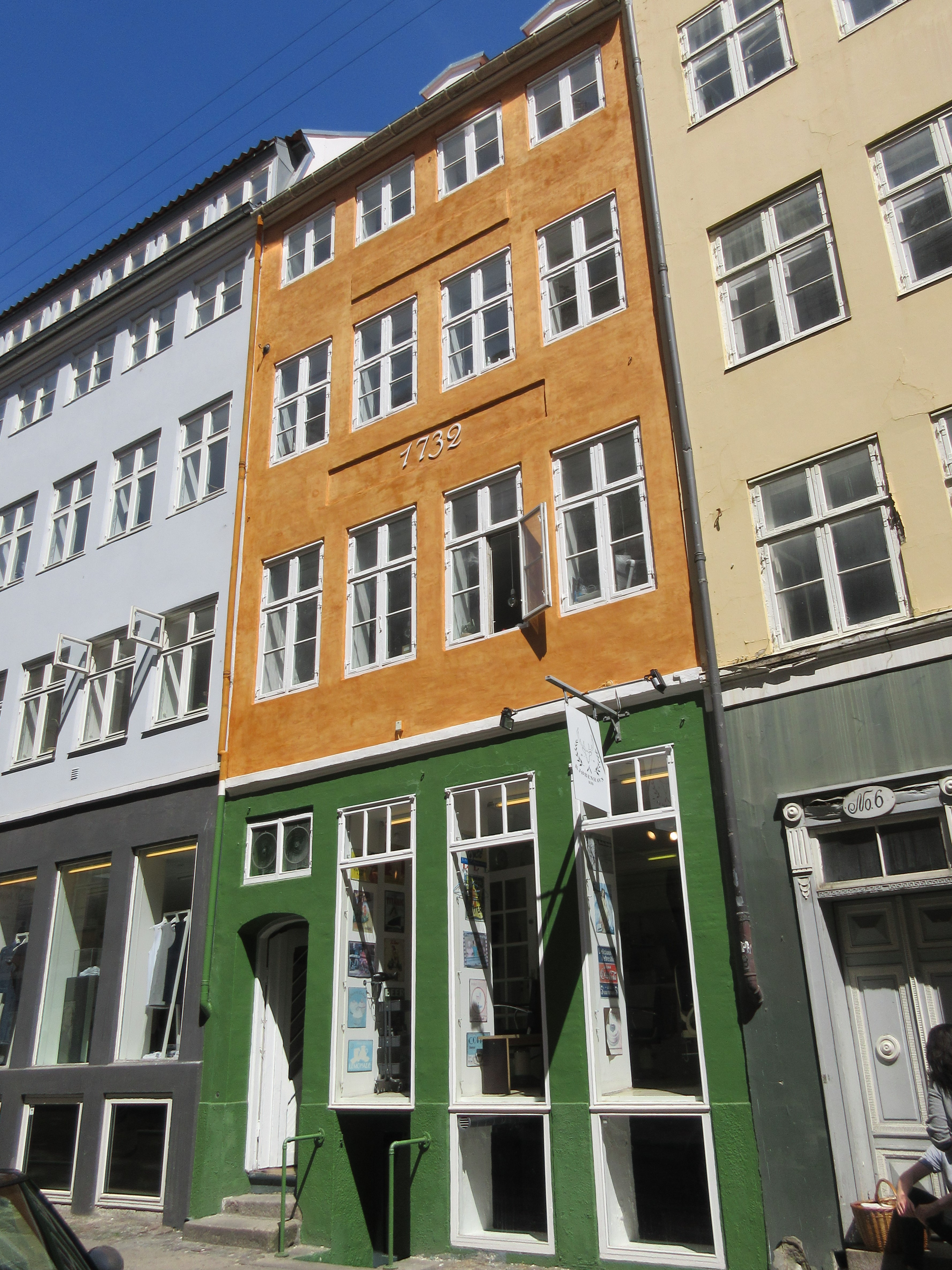
- Interactive map of the Kosterstræde 8 area

General information
- Location: Copenhagen, Denmark
- Coordinates: 55°40′44.29″N 12°34′32.92″E
- Completed: 1732
- Renovated: 1782–1795 (heightened)

Klosterstræde 8 is an 18th-century, three-winged building situated in Klosterstræde, around the corner from the shopping street Strøget, in central Copenhagen, Denmark. Originally constructed with three storeys in 1732, with timber framing, as part of the rebuilding of the city following the Copenhagen Fire of 1728, half a century later it was heightened with one storey and partly reconstructed in brick. The front wing was listed on the Danish registry of protected buildings and places in 1974. The side wing and rear wing are not part of the heritage listing. The journalist, author and translator Loulou Lassen owned the property in the 1900s.

== History ==
=== Early history ===
The property was listed in Copenhagen's first cadastre from 1689 as No. 54 in Frimand's Quarter, owned by shoemaker Hendrich Balch. The property was destroyed in the Copenhagen Fire of 1728, together with most of the other buildings in the area. The fire site was subsequently expanded with a small portion of No. 65 (owned by Baltzer Sung in 1689). The present building on the site was constructed for shoemaker Kristian Krebs. Krebs' profession dominated the street in the 18th century. In spite of its relatively short length, Klosterstræde was thus home to up to 21 shoemakers at a time.

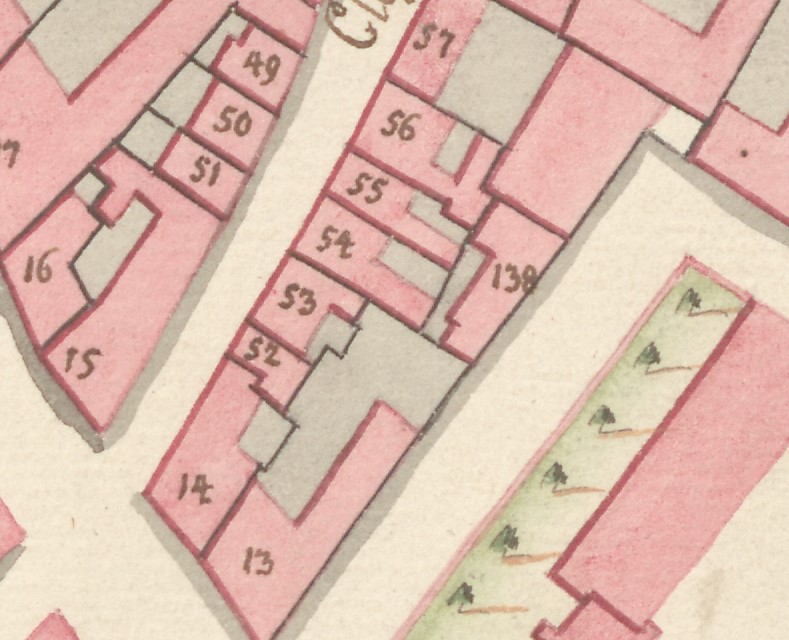
No. 55 seen on a detail from Christian Gedde's map of Frimand's Quarter.

The property was listed in the new cadastre of 1756 as No. 55 in Frimand's Quarter, owned by shoemaker Jacob Thorsen. The property was later passed to his son Peder. He continued his father's shoemaker's workshop in the building. The property was home to 20 residents in four households at the 1898 census. Peder Thorsen resided in the building with his wife Johane Norman, their 20-year-old daughter Christiana, seven shoemakers, one of the shoemaker's wife and three shoemaker's apprentices. Ester Simon, widow of Lazarus Simons (Jewish), resided in the building with three unmarried children (aged 24 to 30). Daniel Linkmeyer, a master tailor, resided in the building with his wife Johanne Christens Datter, their two children (aged one and six), a maid and a lodger (teacher). Jacob Wilhielm, a royal stableman, resided in the building with his wife Karen Clausdatter and their three children (aged three to 11).

=== 1800–1836 ===
The property was home to 26 residents in four households at the 1801 census. Bernhardt Friehling, a master shoemaker and the owner of the property, resided in the building with his wife Sara Friehling, their four children (aged four to 13) and one lodger. Gram )no first name recorded), another master shoemaker, resided in the building with his wife Mette Marie Gram, their two children (aged eight and 12) as well as inspector at Holmen Jacob Petersen Dreyer, his wife Kirstine Dreyer and their three children (aged seven to 14). Senstius (no first name recorded), a senior clerk (fuldmægtig) for one merchant Petersen), resied in the building with his wife Marie Elisabeth Senstius, their one-year-old daughter and one maid. Johan Henrich Krohn, a master button maker, resided in the building with his wife Kirstine Mortensen, a button maker (employee), an apprentice and two lodgers.

The property was listed in the new cadastre of 1806 as No. 84 in Frimand's Quarter. It belonged to Bernt Frøling at that time.

The property was later owned by master tailor David Friderichsen. He was married to Marie Kirstine Frederiksdatter Len (1788–1861).

=== Dahlberg family ===
Marie Kirstine Frederiksdatter Len was after her husband's death on 24 December 1836 married to master shoemaker Peter Nielsen (Thunbo) Dahlberg (1786–1864). He was the owner of No. 81 in the same street (later Klosterstræde 3, now replaced by Philip Smidth's extension of the Neye Building. Kirstine Frederiksdatter Len was his third wife. His first wife had died in labour just four months after the wedding back in 1808. His second wife was Sophie Elisabeth Nørring (née Anker, ?-1836), widow of master tailor Esbiorn Norsing (1758–1808), who had died back in May that same year.

Dahlberg had four children from his second marriage. His former wife had furthermore brought two daughters by her first husband into the marriage. Fahlberg's son Peter Frederik Fahlberg (1809–1881), was a master shoemaker like his father. He resided on the second floor of No. 84 for more than 20 years.

The property was home to 30 residents at the 1840 census. Peter Frederik Dahlberg resided on the second floor with his wife Cathrine Sofie Frederikke (née Jensen, 1818–1886), their two children (aged three and four), four lodgers (three shoemakers and a master painter) and one shoemaker's apprentice. Friderich Filbart, another master shoemaker, ill at that time, resided on the third floor with his wife Ida Filbert født Dølb, their five-year-old son Jacobine Wilhelmine and one lodger. Ane Marie Jensen, a woman married to a coachman (Ole Jensen, for some reason not mentioned as a resident of the building), resided on the same floor with her five-year-old son Sophie Frideriche. Elisabeth Svendsen, an unmarried woman dealing in hides, resided on the ground floor with her sisters Severine and Frederikke Svendsen (aged 13 and 23) and the 60-year-old woman Birgithe Jensen. Lars Just Holmstrøm, a ship carpenter, resided on the first floor with his wife Johanne M.Lund, their two children (twins, aged one) and the 74-year-old widowAmalie E.Holst. Ellen Marie Nielsen, a widow green grocer, resided in the basement with three unmarried children (aged 23 to 36). The two sons were both brick-layers

Peter Frederik Fahlberg was later joined by his half sister Juli Marie (née Nørring, 1802-?). She was married to master plumber Hans Jacob Wandrup. They moved into the ground-floor apartment.

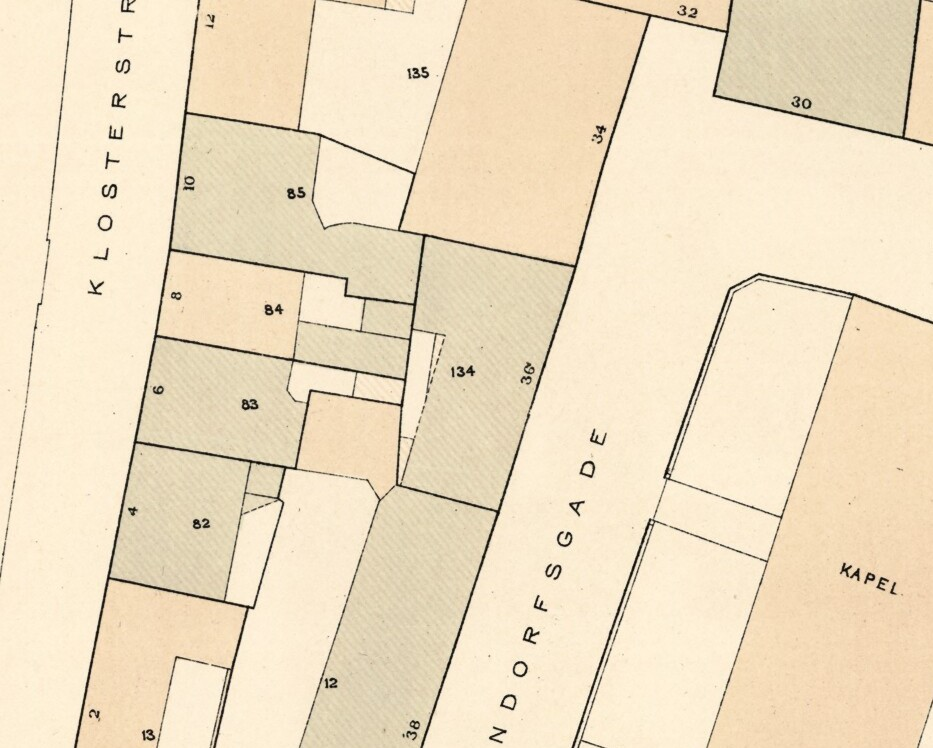
Klosterstræde 8 seen on a detail from one of Berggreen's block plans of Frimand's Quarter, 1886–88.

The property was listed as Klosterstræde 6 when house numbering by street was introduced in 1859 as a supplement to the old cadastral numbers by quarter. Klosterstræde 7 was home to 25 residents at the 1860 census.Peter and Frederikke resided on the second floor with their now five children (aged 13 to 23). Hans Jacob and Julie Wandrup and Juliane resided on the ground floor with their three children (aged 15 to 20). Georg Webster, a metal worker, resided on the first floor with his wife Kirstine Christensen and two lodgers. Carl Frederiksen, another master shoemaker, resided on the third floor with his wife Elise (née Flach) and their two children (aged nine and 13). Karne Svitzer, a cleaning lady (widow), resided in the garret with her son Julius Frederik Lassen. Hans Aagesen, a barkeeper, resided in the basement with his wife Karen Marie Hansen and their and one maid.

=== 20th century ===
The ridged roof is clad in red tiles. The journalist Loulou Lassen owned the building from at least 1908. She worked for the newspapers Dannebrog and Politiken. She also published a novel and worked as a translator.

== Architecture ==
The original house from 1732 was a three-winged, half-timbered complex, surrounding a central light well, constructed with three storeys over a walk-out basement. The just four bays wide facade was crowned by a two-bay gabled wall dormer. The front wing was heightened with one storey some time between 1782 and 1795. The facades towards the street and yard and one of the gables were at the same time reconstructed in brick. The facade is finished with a projecting band above the groind floor and a white-ainted cornice. It features a projecting rectangular band between the two central windows of the first and second floor and a recessed rectangular band between the two central windows of the second and third floor. The facade is plastered and green-painted on the ground floor and the exposed part of the basement and rendered with iron vitriol on the upper floors. The window frames are white-painted.

== Today ==
Klosterstræde 8 is dicided into condominiums and is jointly owned by the owners via E/F Klosterstræde 8. It contains a shop on the ground floor and in the basement, a residential apartment on the first floor and a two-storey apartment on the second and third floor.
