= Lili Elbe =

Danish painter and transgender woman (1882–1931)

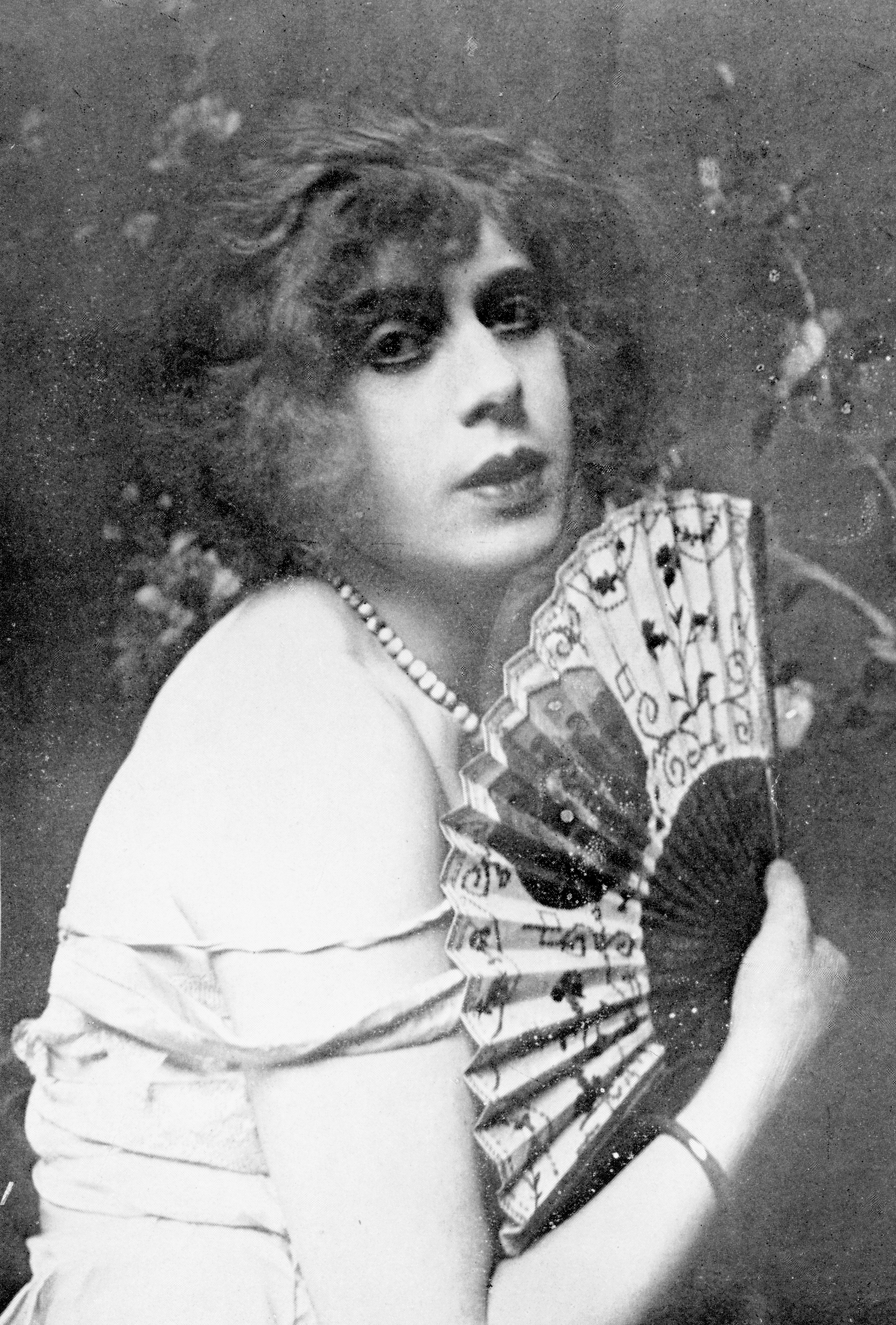
- Elbe in 1926
- Born: 28 December 1882; Vejle, Denmark
- Died: 13 September 1931 (aged 48); Dresden, Germany
- Other name: Lili Ilse Elvenes (legal name)
- Spouse: Gerda Wegener (m. 1904; annul. 1930)

Lili Ilse Elvenes (28 December 1882 – 13 September 1931), better known as Lili Elbe, was a Danish painter, transgender woman, and one of the earliest recipients of sex reassignment surgery.

Elbe was a painter under her male birth name. After medically transitioning in 1930, she changed her legal name to Lili Ilse Elvenes, stopped painting, and later adopted the surname Elbe. She was the first known recipient of a uterus transplant in an attempt to achieve pregnancy, but died due to the subsequent complications.

The UK and US versions of her semi-autobiographical narrative were published posthumously in 1933 under the title Man into Woman: An Authentic Record of a Change of Sex. A film inspired by her life, The Danish Girl, was released in 2015. An opera based on her life, Lili Elbe, composed by Tobias Picker, premiered in 2023.

== Early life ==
It is generally believed that Elbe was born in 1882, in Vejle, Denmark, the child of Ane Marie Thomsen and spice merchant Mogens Wilhelm Wegener, according to the registry at St. Nicolai Church. Her birth year is sometimes cited as 1886 by a book about her in which some facts have been changed to protect the identities of the persons involved. Facts about the life of her wife Gerda Wegener-Gottlieb, suggest that the 1882 date is correct because they married while at college in 1904, when Elbe would have been just eighteen if the 1886 date were correct.

It is speculated that Elbe was intersex, although that has been disputed. Some reports indicate that she already had rudimentary ovaries in her abdomen and may have had Klinefelter syndrome.

== Marriage and modelling ==
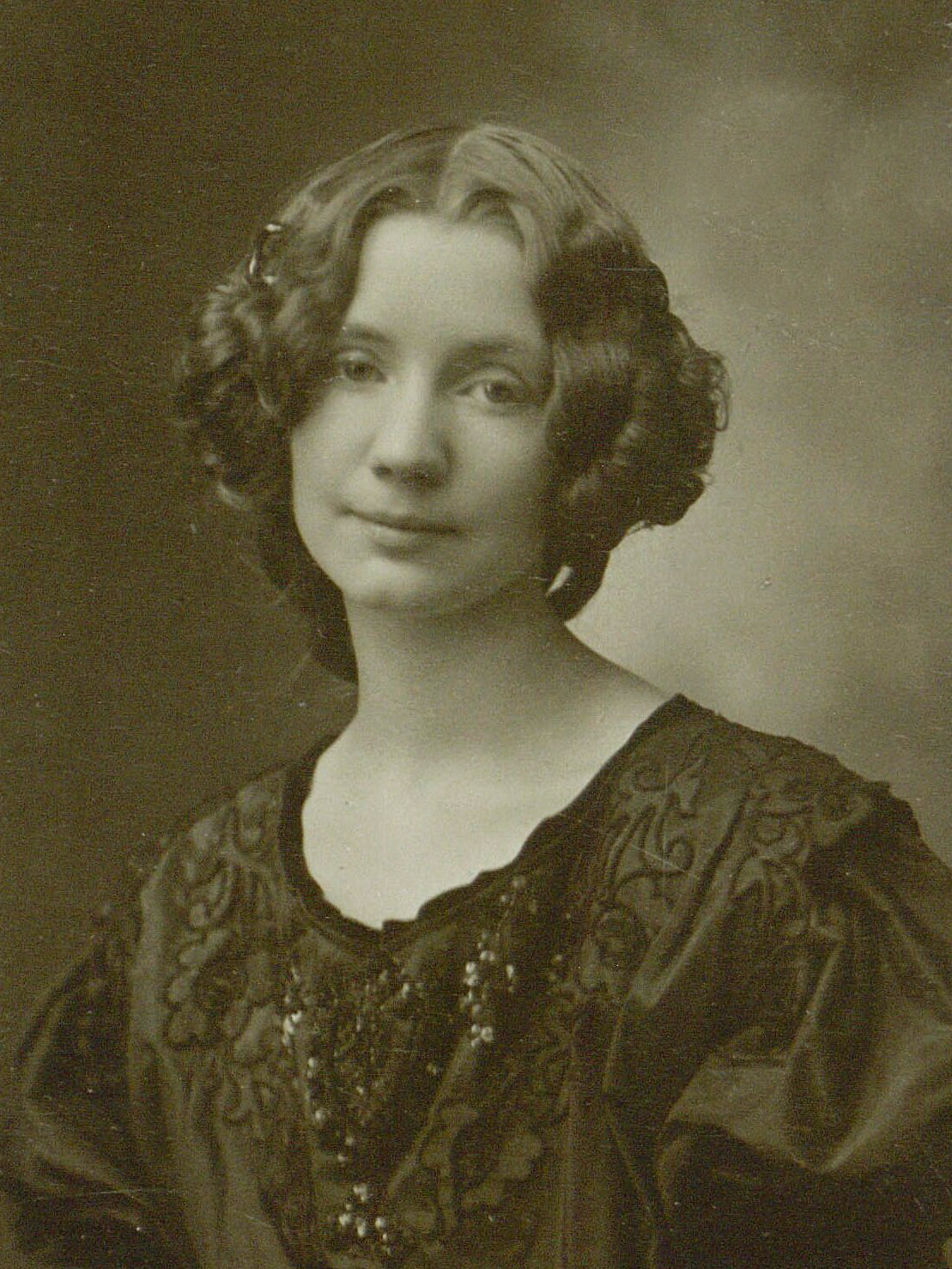
Gerda Gottlieb, 1904

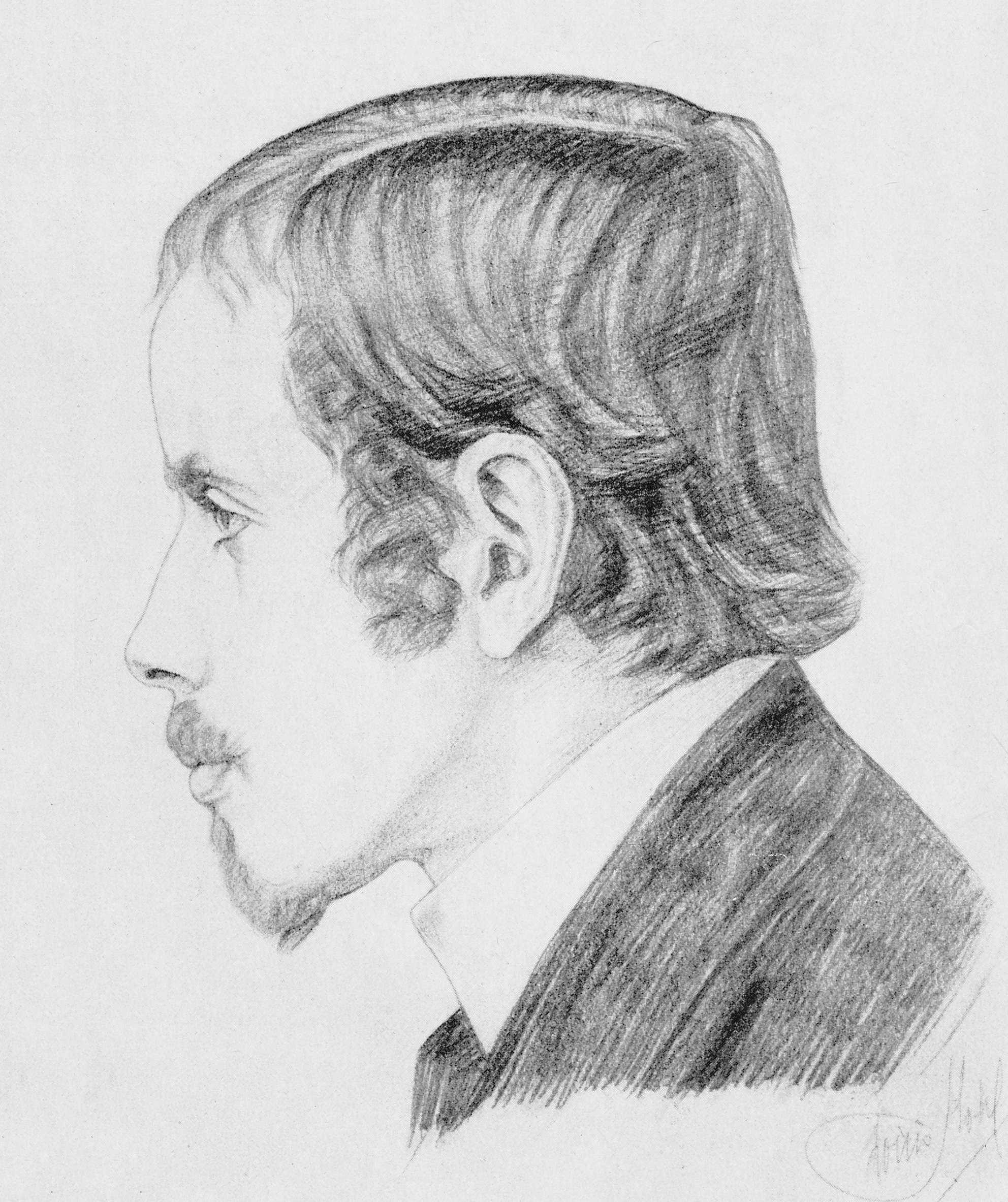
Elbe c. 1920

Elbe met Gerda Gottlieb while they were students at the Royal Danish Academy of Fine Arts in Copenhagen, and they married in 1904 when Gottlieb was nineteen and Elbe twenty-two. Gerda came from a conservative family, as her father was a vicar in the Lutheran church. They worked as illustrators, with Elbe specialising in landscape paintings while Gottlieb illustrated books and fashion magazines.

They travelled throughout Italy and France before settling in Paris in 1912, where Elbe could live more openly as a woman by posing as Gottlieb's sister-in-law. Elbe received the Neuhausens prize in 1907 and exhibited at Kunstnernes Efterårsudstilling (the Artists' Autumn Exhibition) at the Vejle Museum of Art in Denmark, where she remains represented, and in the Saloon and Salon d'Automne in Paris.

Elbe started dressing in women's clothes after she found she enjoyed the stockings and heels she wore to fill in for Gottlieb's model, actress Anna Larssen, who, on one occasion, had been late for a sitting. Larssen suggested the name Lili, and, by the 1920s, Elbe regularly presented with that name as a woman, attending various festivities and entertaining guests in her house. Gottlieb became famous for her paintings of beautiful women with haunting, almond-shaped eyes, dressed in chic apparel. The model for these depictions of petites femmes fatales was Elbe. Elbe stopped painting after her medical transition.

Depictions of Elbe by Gottlieb

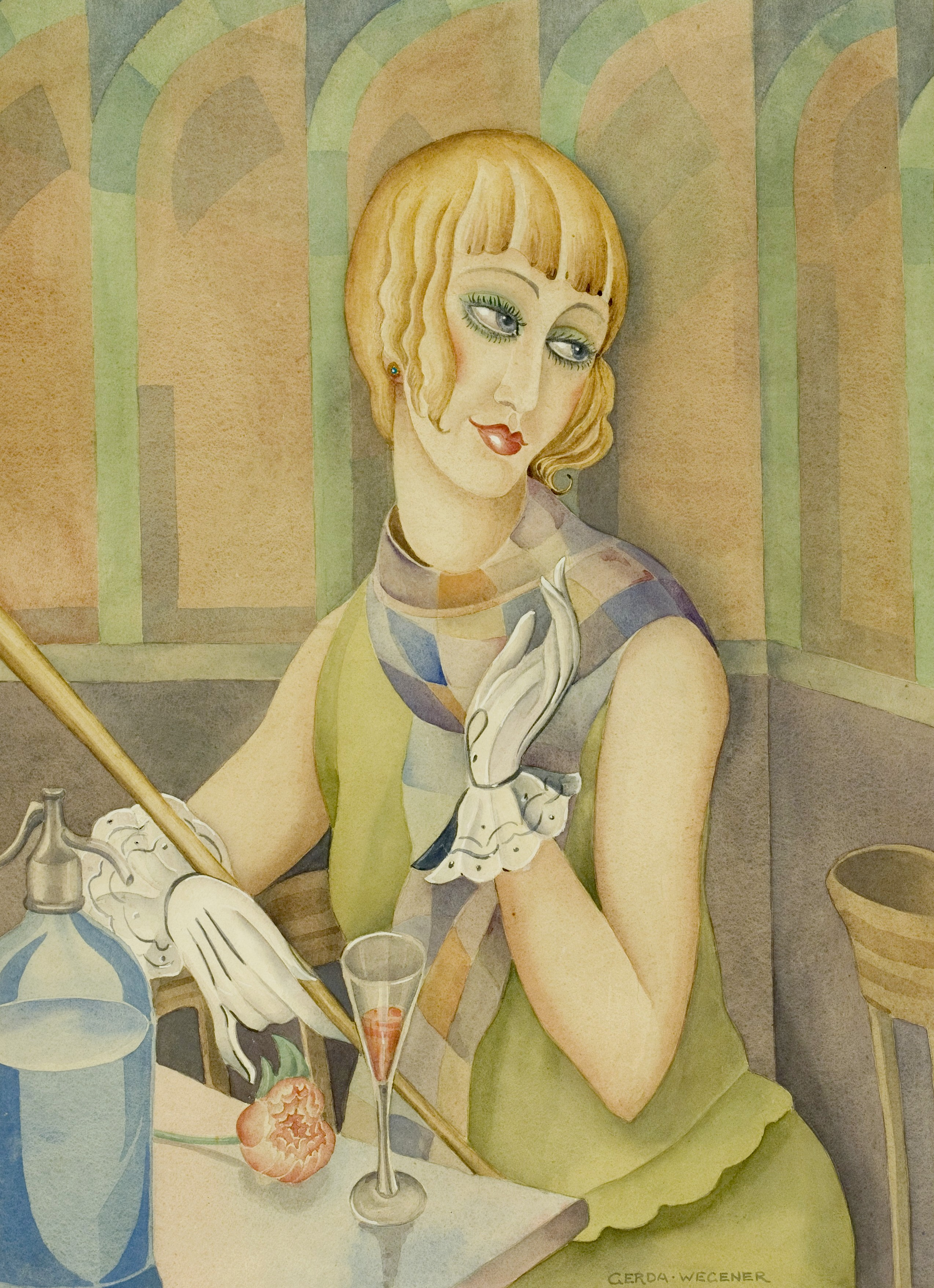
Portrait, c. 1928

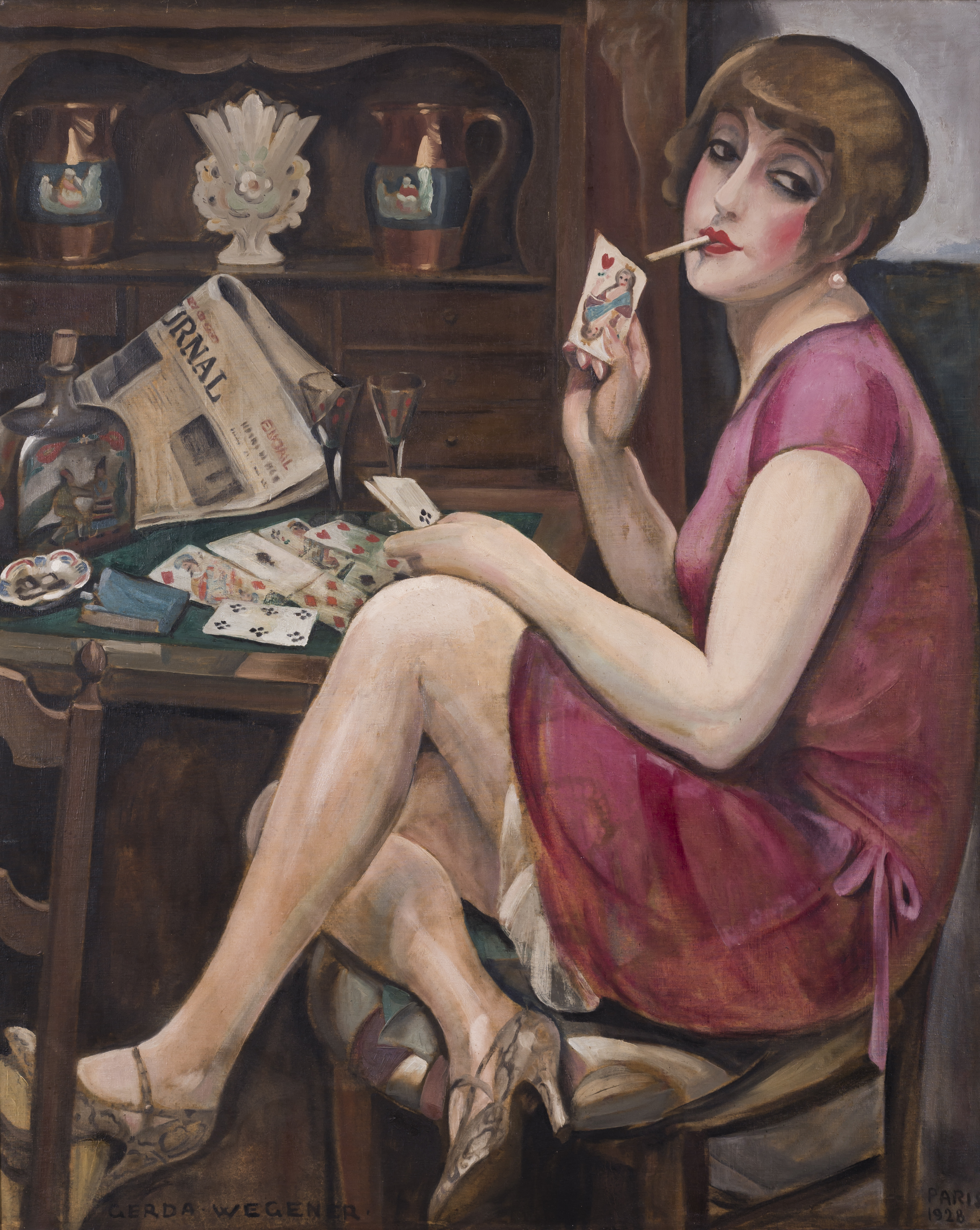
Portrait, n.d.

== Surgeries and dissolution of marriage ==
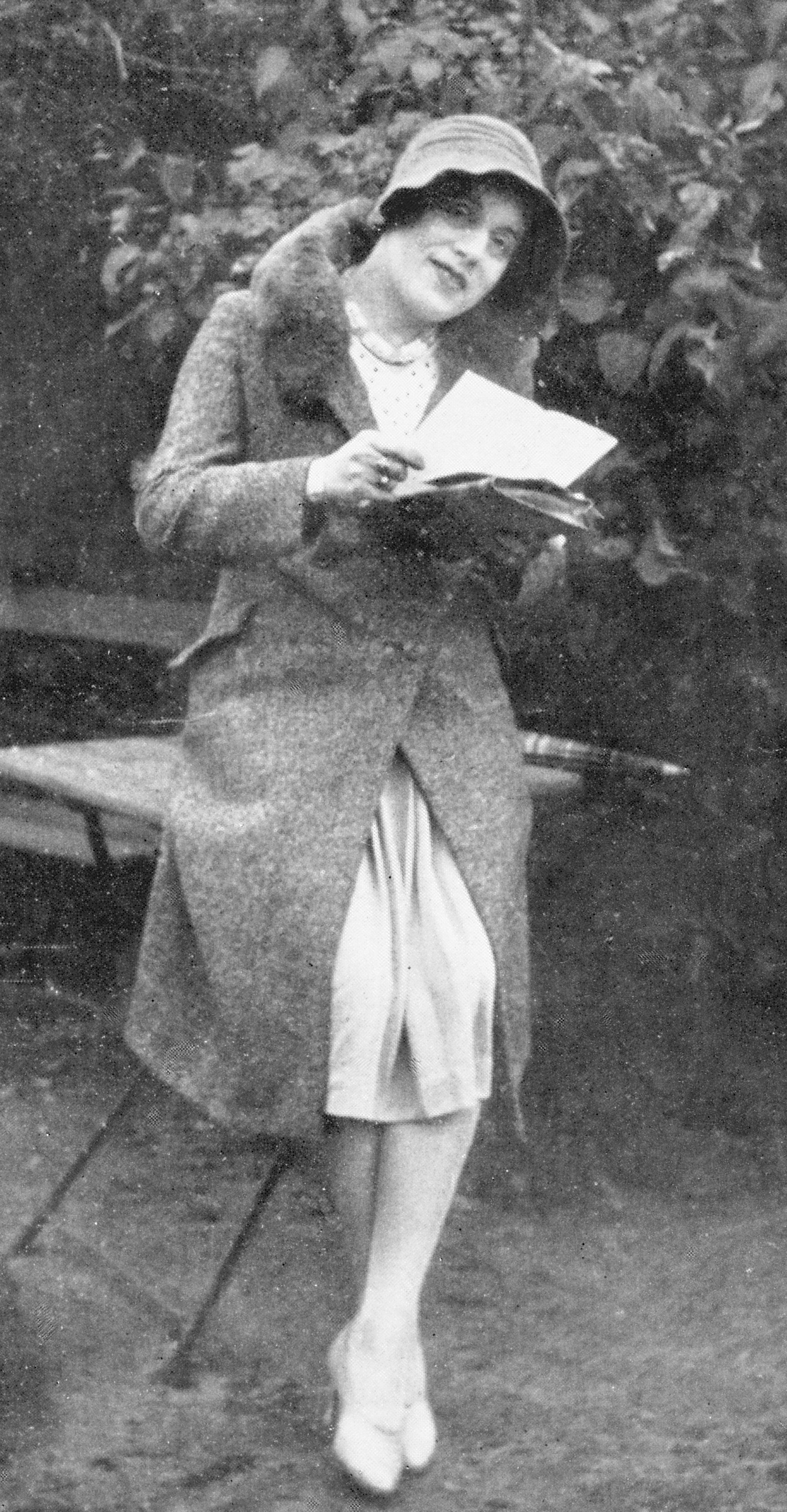
Elbe in 1930

In 1930, Elbe went to Germany for sex reassignment surgery, which was highly experimental at the time. She contemplated suicide before learning of these options. While in Germany, Elbe stayed in the Hirschfeld Institute for Sexual Science. Prior to commencing any surgical procedures, Elbe's psychological health was evaluated by German sexologist Magnus Hirschfeld through a series of tests. A series of four operations were then carried out over a period of two years. The first surgery, performed in Berlin, was the removal of the testicles, carried out by Erwin Gohrbandt. The remainder of her surgeries were carried out by Kurt Warnekros, a doctor at the Dresden Municipal Women's Clinic. All of Lili Elbe's medical documents were ruined as a consequence of the Allied bombing raids that destroyed the clinic and its archives. The second operation was to implant an ovary onto her abdominal musculature and the third to remove the penis and the scrotum. By this time, her case had become a sensation in Danish and German newspapers. A Danish court annulled the couple's marriage in October 1930, and Elbe was able to have her sex and name legally changed, even receiving a passport as Lili Ilse Elvenes. The name "Lili Elbe" was first used in print in a Danish newspaper article written by Copenhagen journalist Louise "Loulou" Lassen for Politiken in February 1931. Elbe returned to Dresden and began a relationship with French art dealer Claude Lejeune, whom she wanted to marry and have children with. Gerda went on to marry an Italian man after separating from Elbe, although the marriage ended in divorce shortly after.

In 1931, Elbe returned for her fourth surgery, to transplant a uterus and construct a vaginal canal. This made her one of the earliest transgender women to undergo a vaginoplasty surgery, a few weeks after Erwin Gohrbandt performed the experimental procedure on Dora Richter.

== Death ==
Following Elbe's fourth surgery, her immune system rejected the transplanted uterus, as immunosuppressive drugs were not yet widely used as they are with modern organ transplants. Organ rejection caused an infection, which led to her death from cardiac arrest on 13 September 1931 in Dresden, Germany, three months after the surgery.

Elbe was buried in Trinity Cemetery in Dresden, Germany, but the grave was leveled in the 1960s. In April 2016, a new tombstone was erected, financed by Focus Features, the production company that produced The Danish Girl.

== Paintings ==
Apart from being one of the earliest recipients of gender-affirming surgery, Elbe was also a painter, but quit once she transitioned. The majority of Elbe's painting focused on landscapes. She had many successful paintings, including Portrait de femme (1923), Parti Fra Capri (1921), View from the Garden of Versailles (1922), Coastal View from France (1918), and Trianon (1920), to name a few.

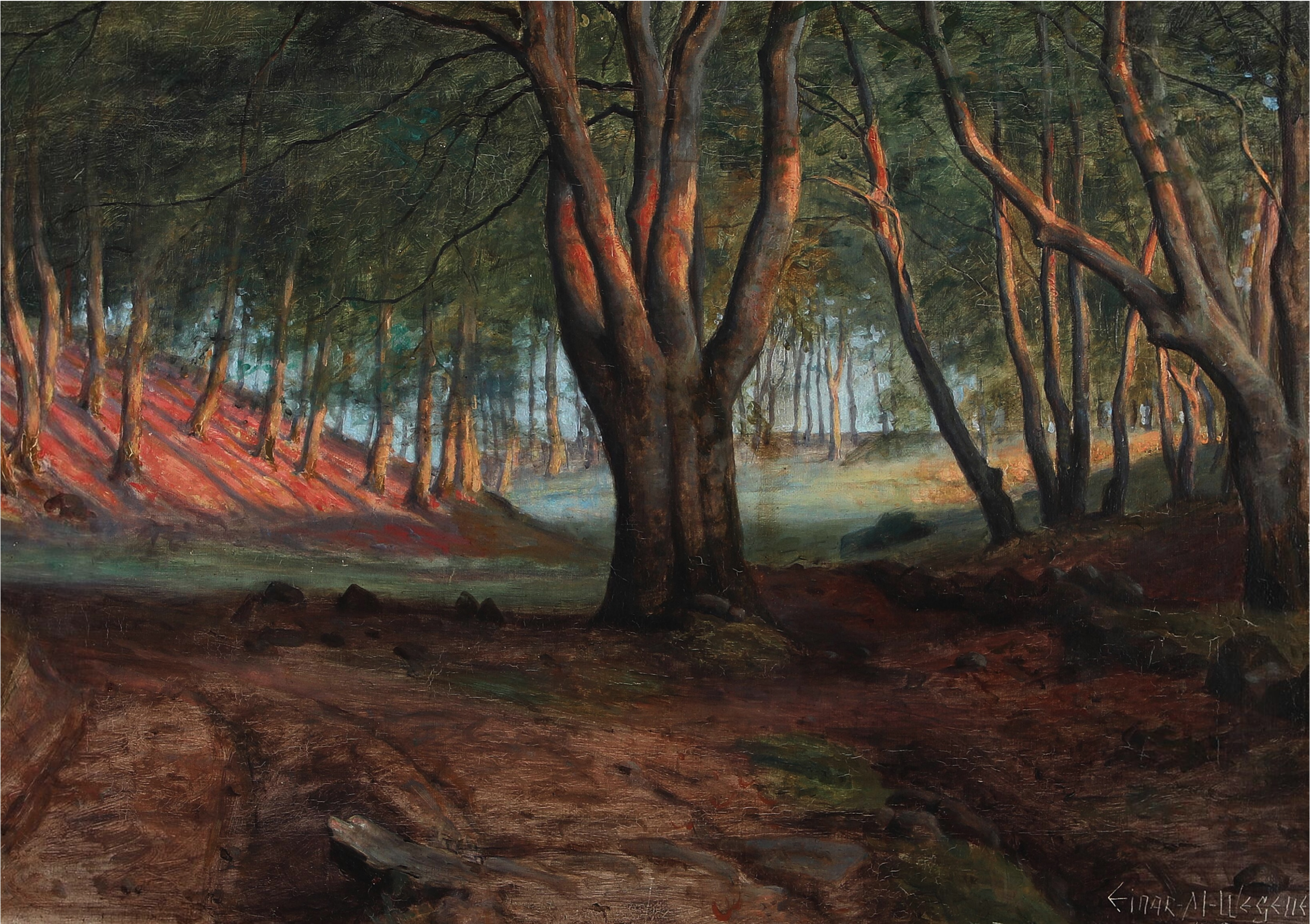
Forest scene (1905)

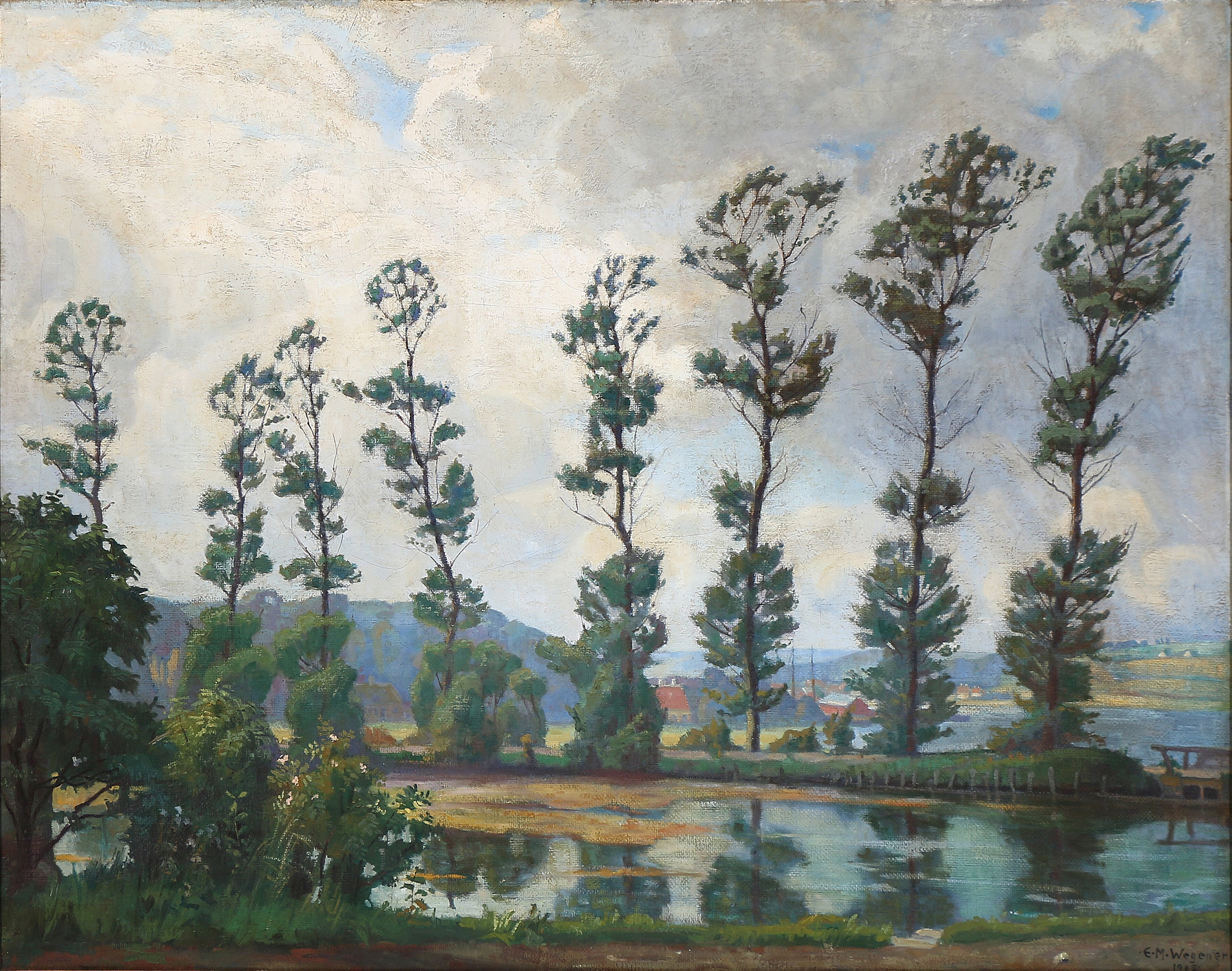
Poplars along Hobro Fjord (1908)

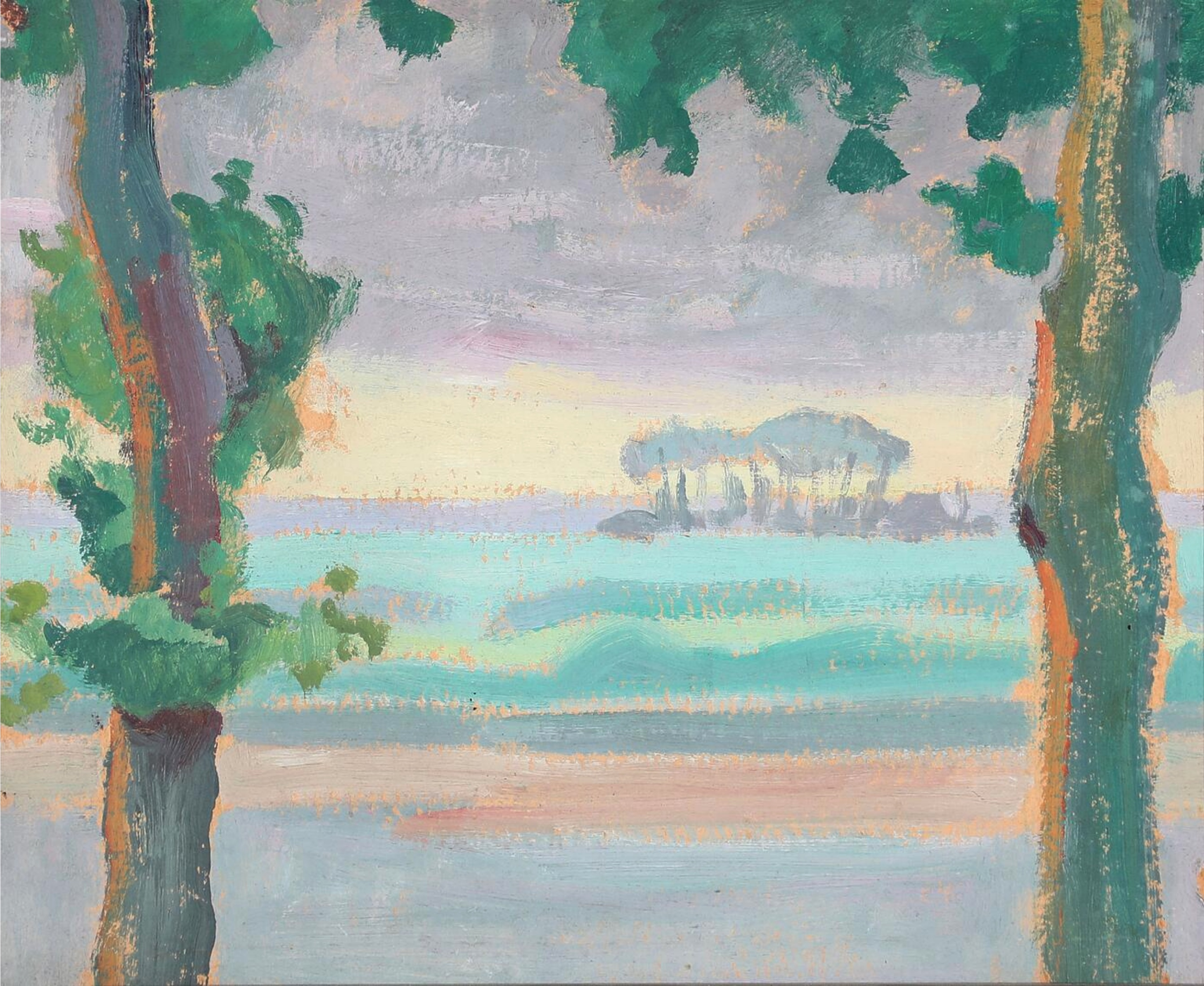
Landscape with trees (1911)

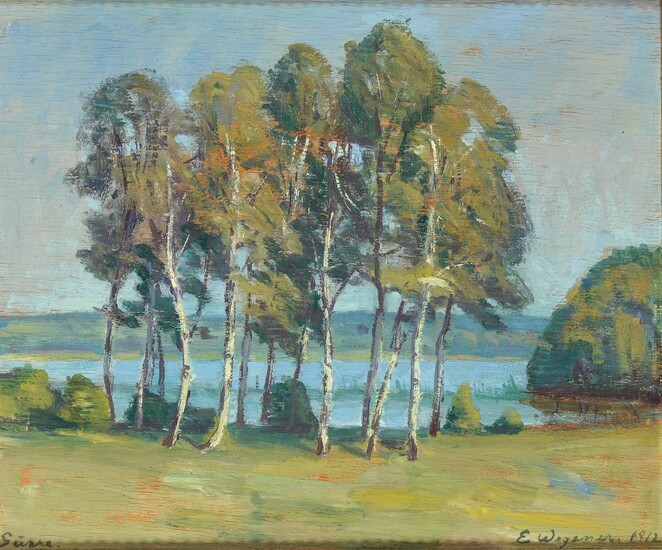
Landskabsparti (1912)

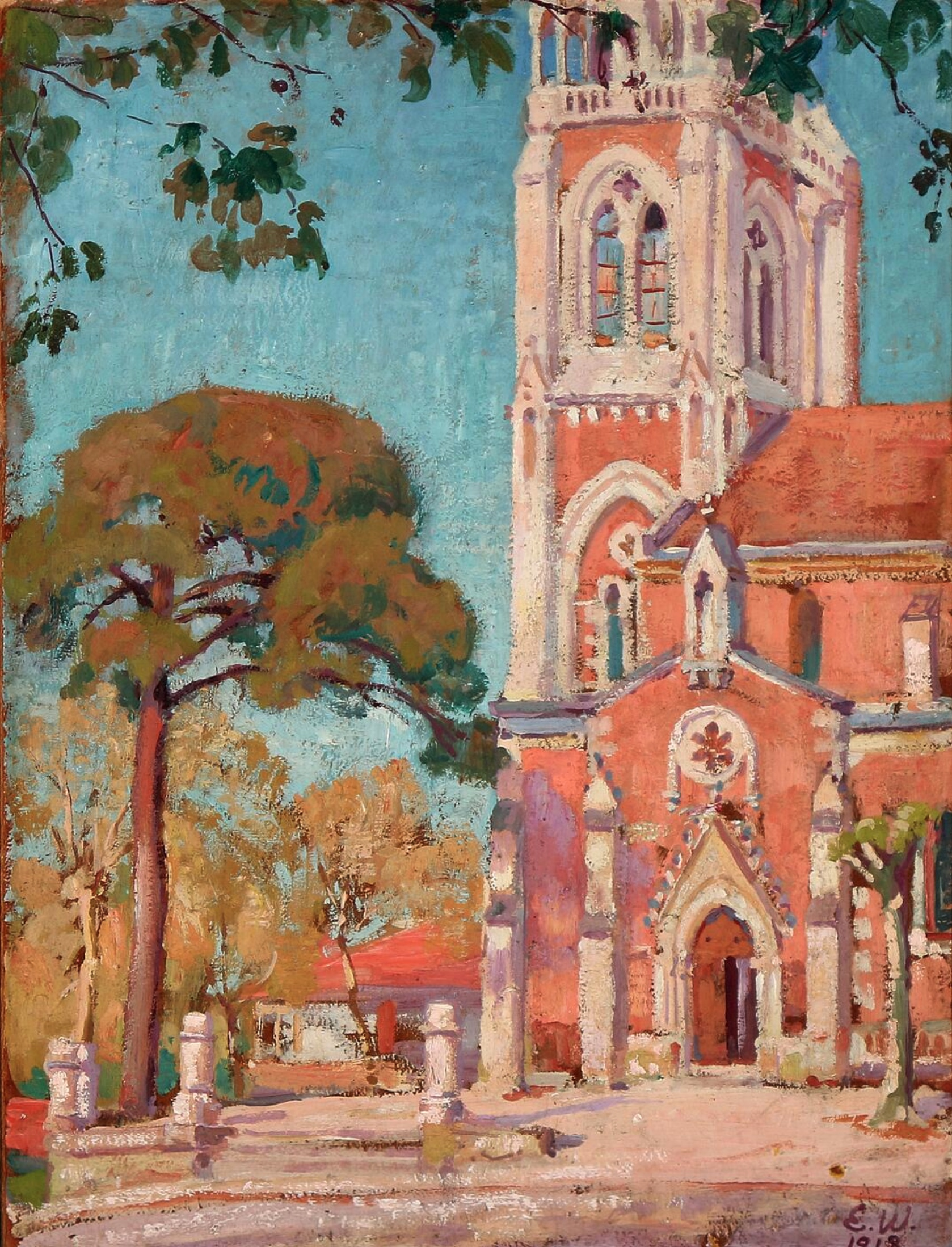
Notre Dame d'Arcachon (1918)

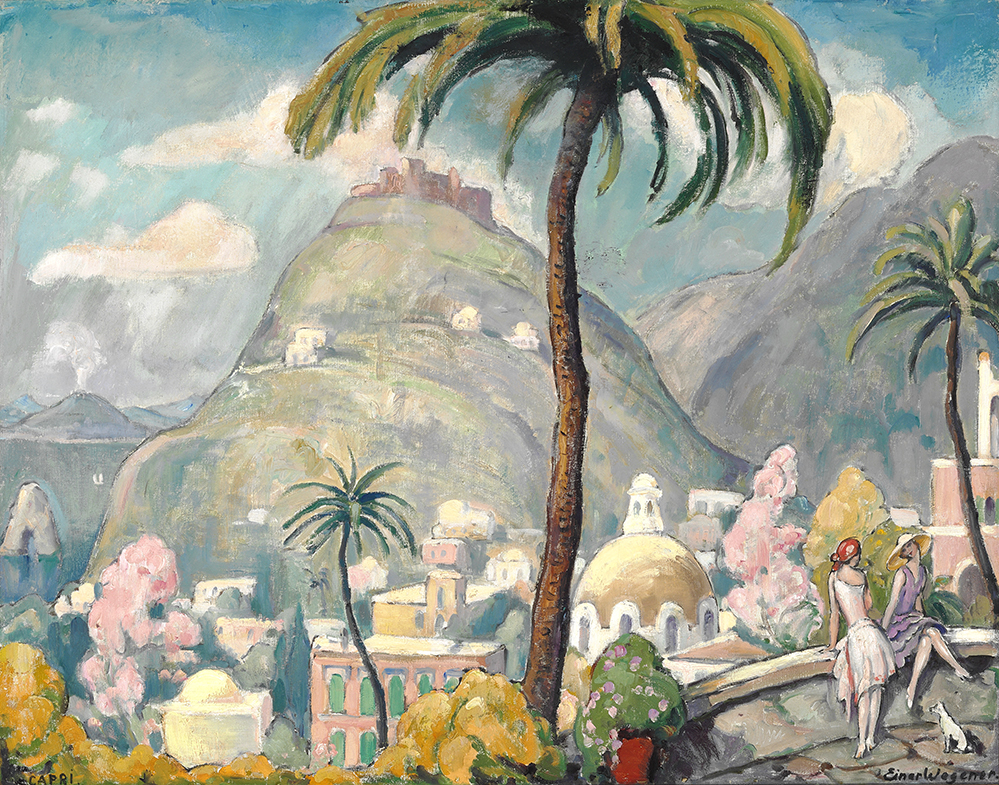
Gerda and Einar at the terrace (1920)

== In popular culture ==
The LGBTQ+ film festival MIX Copenhagen gives out four Lili Awards each year, named after Elbe.

In 2000, David Ebershoff wrote The Danish Girl, a fictionalized account of Elbe's life. It was an international bestseller and translated into many languages. This novel provided one of the earliest fictional accounts of gender affirmation surgery, which shaped LGBTQ+ literature. In 2015, it was made into a film of the same name, produced by Gail Mutrux and Neil LaBute, starring Eddie Redmayne as Elbe. The film was well received at the Venice Film Festival in September 2015, though it has been criticised for casting a cisgender man to play a transgender woman. Both the novel and film omitted several topics, including Gottlieb's sexuality, which is evidenced by the subjects in her erotic drawings, and the disintegration of Gottlieb and Elbe's relationship after their annulment.

Tobias Picker's opera Lili Elbe, featuring Lucia Lucas, premiered at Theater St. Gallen, Switzerland. Based on the life of Lili Elbe and the book Man into Woman: An Authentic Record of a Change of Sex, the opera premiered on 22 October 2023, and received "Best World Premiere" in the 2023 Oper! Awards.

In 2026, it was announced that The Danish Girl would be adapted into a stage musical with music by Alex Parker and book and lyrics by Nora Brigid Monahan. The musical had its first public presentation in a concert format later that same year at the David Rubenstein Atrium at Lincoln Center, starring L Morgan Lee as Lili Elbe.

== Publications ==
In 1931, Lili Elbe was living in Denmark collaborating with her friend, Ernst Harthern, on a memoir of her life. Fra Mand til Kvinde was published by her German friend and editor under the name of Niels Hoyer following Elbe's death. The narrative provided details of her life as a Danish painter and her gender confirmation surgery. The possibility of Lili Elbe being intersex has been proposed due her reported possession of both male and female reproductive organs and the loss of medical records documenting her pre-surgical anatomy due to the Allied bombing raids. However, this theory has been disputed. The narrative was published four times, in three different languages over the course of two years. The UK and US versions, Man into Woman: An Authentic Record of a Change of Sex were both published in 1933.

Man into Woman: An Authentic Record of a Change of Sex brought attention to new medical interventions as the story of Lili Elbe was circulated through American publications. American publications, such as "A Man Becomes a Woman” and “When Science Changed a Man into a Woman”, published in the popular magazine, Sexology, associated the story of Lili Elbe with cases of intersex medical interventions. These narratives promoted a binary view of gender, reinforcing gender stereotypes among Americans.

Lili Elbe and her memoir became well known in European media, publicized by Paul Weber. The story encouraged political action and brought awareness to the challenges faced by gender non-conforming people.

== See also ==
- Transgender history
