= Bernard Nevill =

British academic and designer (1930–2019)

Bernard Nevill FRSA FCSD (24 September 1930 – 30 January 2019) was a British designer and academic, formerly a professor at Saint Martin's School of Art and design director for Liberty of London.

== Career ==
Nevill joined Liberty's in 1961, and "revitalised their traditional prints, introducing Art Deco-style patterns and Islamic themes". He was the company's design consultant, and was succeeded by Susan Collier.

== Personal life ==
Nevill lived at West House, a Grade II* listed house at 35 Glebe Place, Chelsea, London, which he bought in 1976 for about £67,000, until he sold it in 2011 for £20 million. It was built in 1868–1869 by the architect Philip Webb, on behalf of the artist George Price Boyce, who lived there from 1870 until his death in 1897.

Some of his paintings, furniture and furnishings, which appeared in the 1987 film Withnail and I and 1998 film B. Monkey were auctioned by Christie's in 2011, and were expected to realise about £200,000. The sale total was actually £471,400. More property belonging to Nevill, including items that appeared in Withnail and I such as Uncle Monty's sofa, was auctioned by Bellmans Auctioneers in February 2022, with the proceeds going to charity.

Nevill died in London at the age of 88 on 30 January 2019 after a long period of illness.
