= Shap Fells =

UK protected area

- IUCN category IV (habitat/species management area) (Note: In the UK, SSSIs are mostly categorised under IUCN category IV, with the future potential to classify primarily geological SSSIs in category III. A few are in category I.)
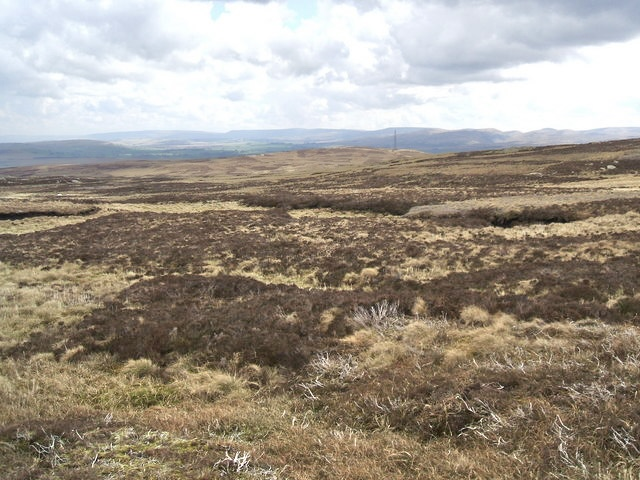
- Shap Fells from south of Sleddale Hall looking east towards the Howgill Fells

- Location within Cumbria
- Nearest town: Shap
- Coordinates: 54.47164°N 2.698957°W
- Area: 2,144 ha (8.28 sq mi)
- Designation: SSSI
- Designated: 1988

Shap Fells is a Site of Special Scientific Interest (SSSI) within the Lake District National Park in Cumbria, England. It is located near the eastern boundary of the park, with one section (formerly named "Shap Pink Quarry") to the west of the A6 road and another section (formerly named "Wasdale Beck Section") to the east of this road.

Shap Fells was designated as a Site of Special Scientific Interest because of the range of acid grassland types, the diversity of upland birds and also because of geological features. Throughout the protected area there are areas of blanket bog. Cumbria Wildlife Trust has been involved in restoring the hydrology of Shap Fells in order to restore the peatland.

Part of the land within the SSSI is owned by United Utilities. The western side of the SSSI is in the civil parish of Shap Rural. The eastern side, east of the A6 road, is in Orton civil parish.
