= Francis Lowe =

Francis Lowe may refer to:

- Sir Francis Lowe, 1st Baronet (1852–1929), British Conservative Party politician
- Sir Gordon Lowe (Francis Gordon Lowe, 1884–1972), English tennis player, son of the above

== See also ==
- Frank Lowe, American saxophonist
- Frank Lowe (advertiser)
