= Binsey, Oxfordshire =

Village in Oxfordshire, England

Coordinates: 51.770°N 1.295°W

Binsey
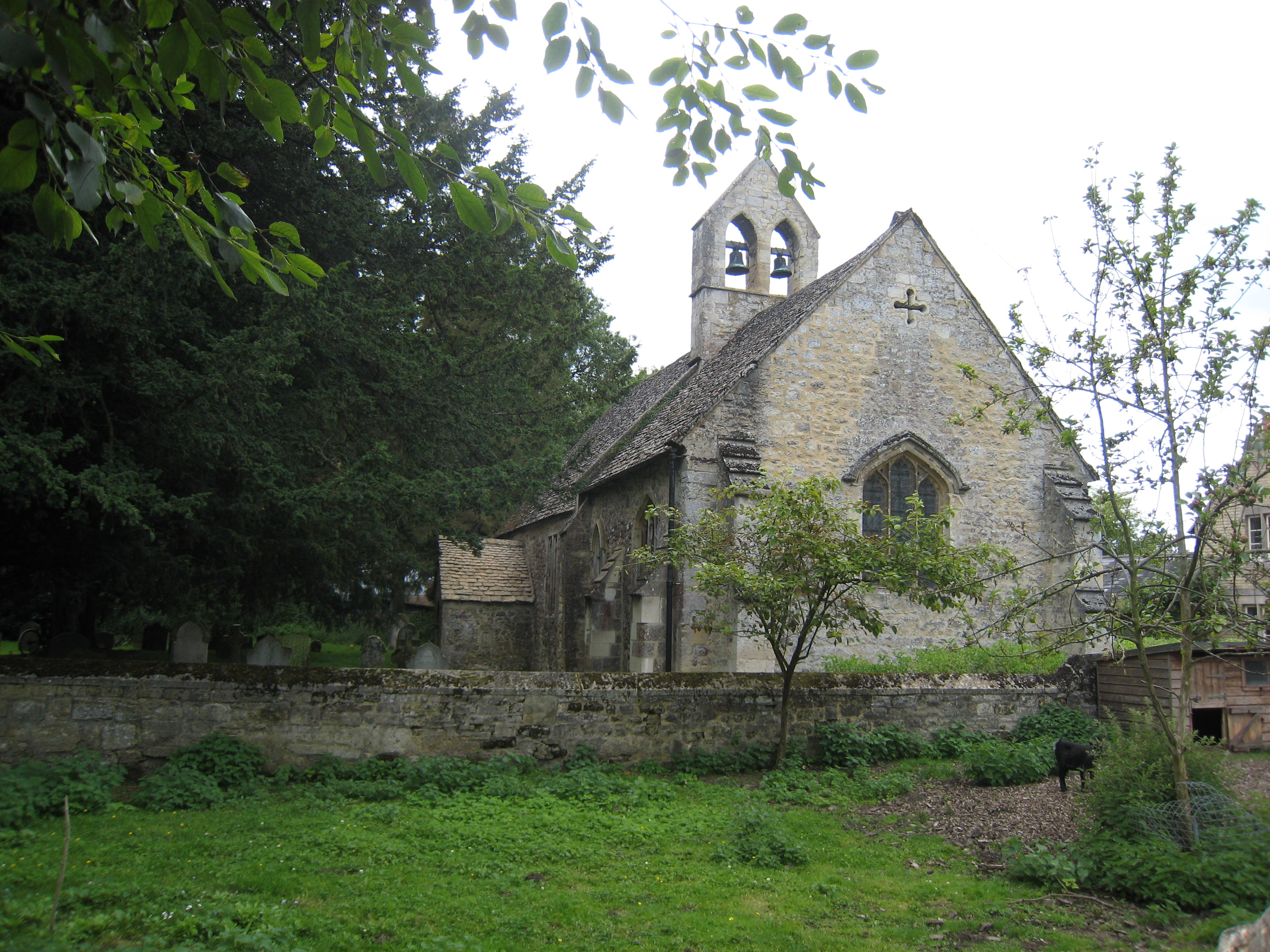
- Parish church of Saint Margaret

- Location within Oxfordshire
- OS grid reference: SP4907
- District: Oxford
- Shire county: Oxfordshire
- Region: South East
- Country: England
- Sovereign state: United Kingdom
- Post town: Oxford
- Postcode district: OX2
- Dialling code: 01865
- Police: Thames Valley
- Fire: Oxfordshire
- Ambulance: South Central
- UK Parliament: Oxford West and Abingdon

Binsey is a small village on the west side of Oxford, in Oxfordshire, England. It lies on the banks of the River Thames about 1.5 miles (2.4 km) northwest of the centre of Oxford, on the opposite side of the river from Port Meadow and about 1 mile (1.6 km) southwest of the ruins of Godstow Abbey.

== History ==
The village and its associated farmland belonged to St Frideswide's Priory during the 14th and 15th centuries, until the priory's dissolution and apparent incorporation into Christ Church, a college of Oxford University, which now owns all of the buildings in Binsey, save one. Plans in 2001 by Christ Church to double the size of the village by demolishing a barn and constructing seven new residences were met with worldwide protests, leading to withdrawal of the proposal.

Binsey was sometimes deemed part of Oxford from the Middle Ages. It was settled as being within the city's boundaries from at least 1800. It remained a separate civil parish until 1926, but as an urban parish it had no parish council of its own, being administered by the city council direct. In 1921 the parish had a population of 63. On 1 April 1926 the parish was abolished and merged with the parish of St Giles and St John, which in turn was abolished in 1933 when all the civil parishes within the city were united into a single parish of Oxford.

=== Church of St Margaret ===
Binsey's most noted feature is the parish church of St Margaret, set at some distance north of the surviving houses. It dates from the 12th century and is a Grade I Listed Building. Its fame lies mostly in that just outside its west end and belltower stands St Margaret's Well, a Grade II Listed Building, which is the model for Lewis Carroll's "Treacle Well" from Alice's Adventures in Wonderland; this is a holy well dedicated to St Frideswide, patron saint of Oxford. According to legend, she fled to Binsey in a bid to escape marriage to a king of Mercia, whose pursuit of her was halted when he was struck blind at the gates of Oxford. Frideswide's prayers brought forth a healing spring, whose waters cured his blindness, and the spring was walled into a shallow well which became a focus for pilgrimage, the mediaeval sense of the word "treacle" meaning "healing unguent". The well became a pilgrimage site in mediaeval times.

The reason for the apparent separation of church and village is revealed best from the air; cropmarks show the floor-plans of houses that lay along the straight road that runs between them, suggesting a much larger village during the mediaeval period, or possibly one that has migrated south.

== Architecture ==
Binsey features a total of nine listed buildings. As well as St Margaret's Church and St Margaret's Well, they are:

- Medley Manor Farmhouse
- Manor Farm Cottage
- Manor Farm House
- The Limes (known locally as Great Leys)
- Barn at Manor Farm
- The Thatched Cottage
- Perch Inn

== In literature ==
An avenue of poplars in Binsey was made famous by Gerard Manley Hopkins in his poem "Binsey Poplars", written when he found the riverside trees felled. The replacements for these trees, which stretch from Binsey to Godstow, lasted until 2004, when the present replantings began.

Theo Faron, the main character in P. D. James's 1992 dystopian novel The Children of Men, visits or refers to various landmarks in Binsey—including St Margaret's, St Frideswide's Priory and The Perch Inn—after having walked to the village from across Port Meadow.

Elizabeth Goudge mentions Binsey, and the holy well, and some of the history, in Chapter 10 "The Holy Well", in her 1938 novel Towers in the Mist (Gerald Duckworth, London, 1938). Her novel is set in 1565 and 1566, culminating in the first visit to Oxford by Queen Elizabeth I of England.

== Gallery ==
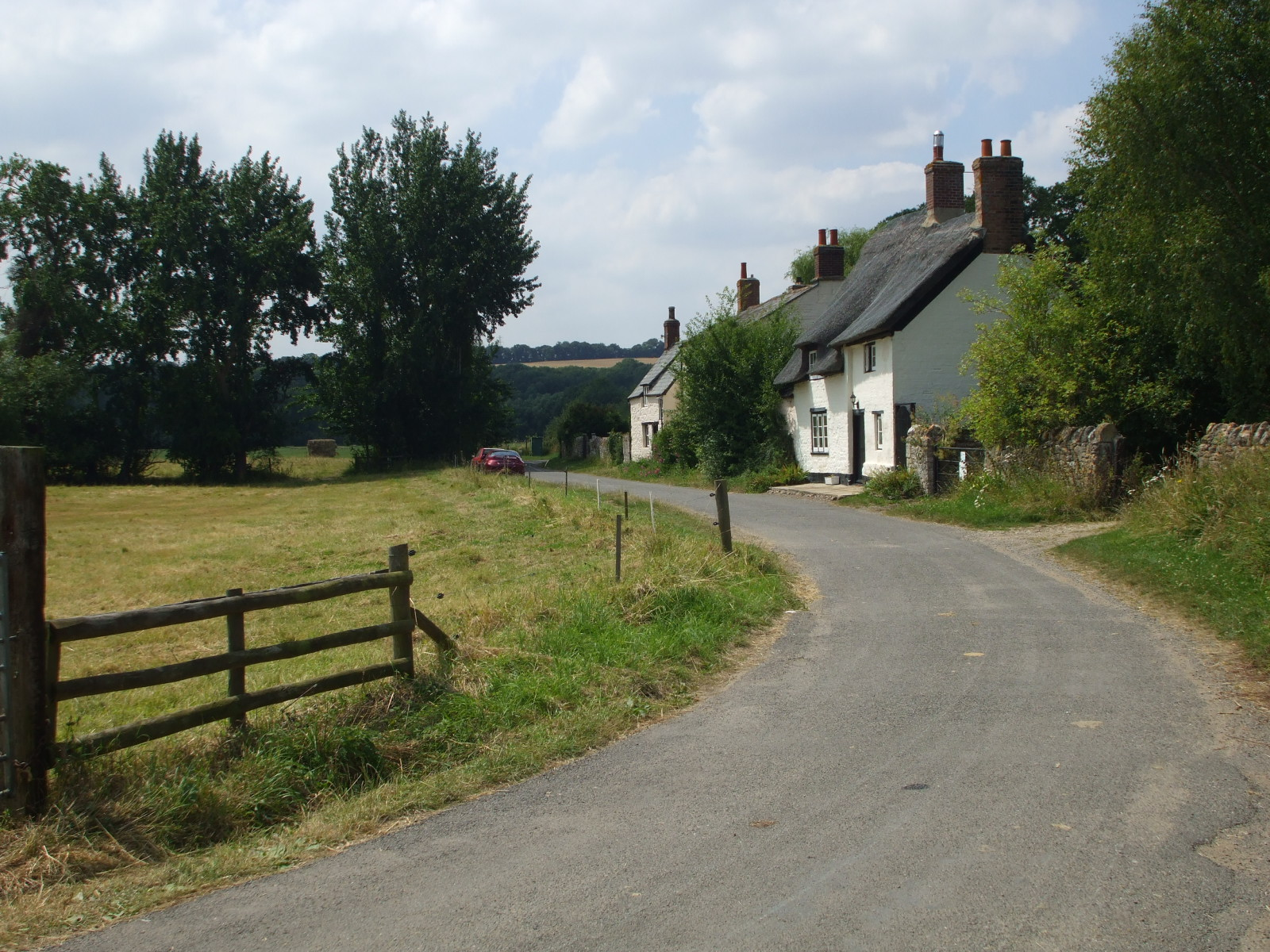
Road through Binsey village.

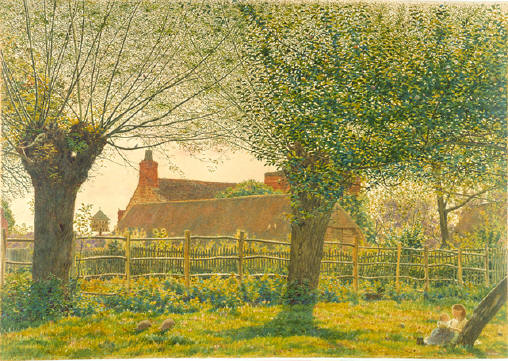
At Binsey, near Oxford (1862), by George Price Boyce.

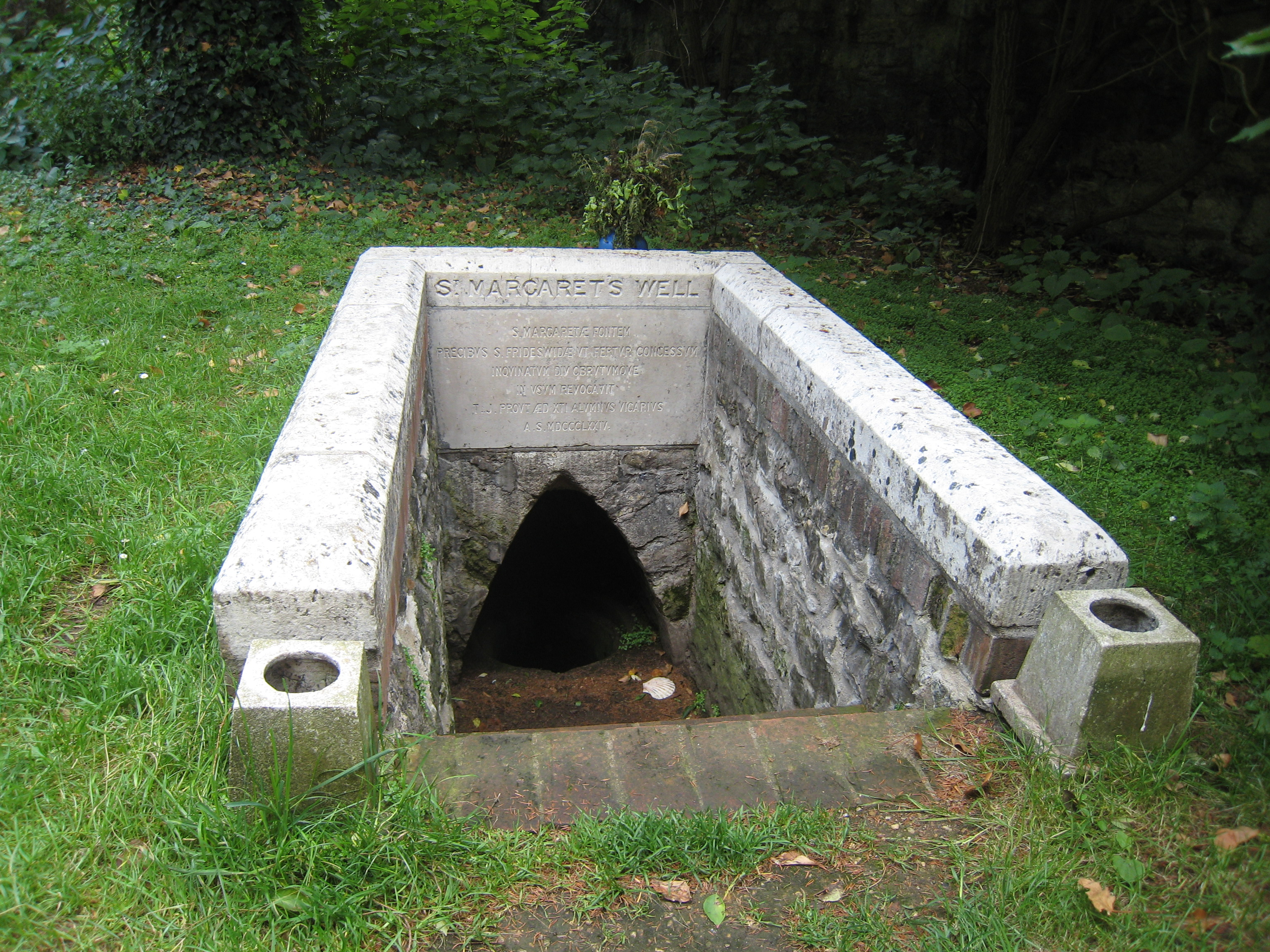
St Margaret's Well, Binsey

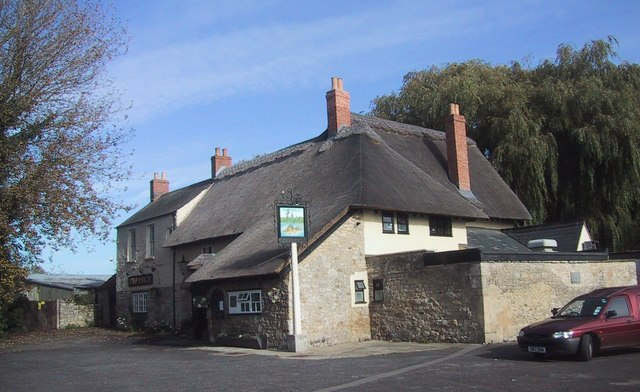
"The Perch" at Binsey

== Sources ==
- Hatts, Leigh (2005). The Thames Path. Cicerone Press. ISBN 978-1-85284-436-3.
- Sherwood, Jennifer; Pevsner, Nikolaus (1974). The Buildings of England: Oxfordshire. Harmondsworth: Penguin Books. pp. 456–457. ISBN 0-14-071045-0.
