= Glebe Place =

Street in Chelsea, London

Coordinates: 51°29′8.46″N 0°10′11.59″W

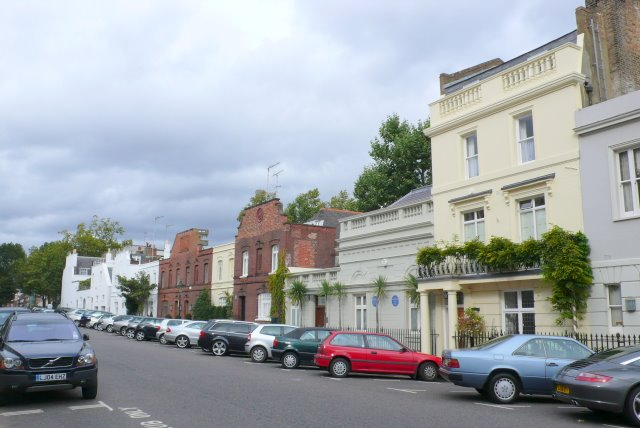
Glebe Place

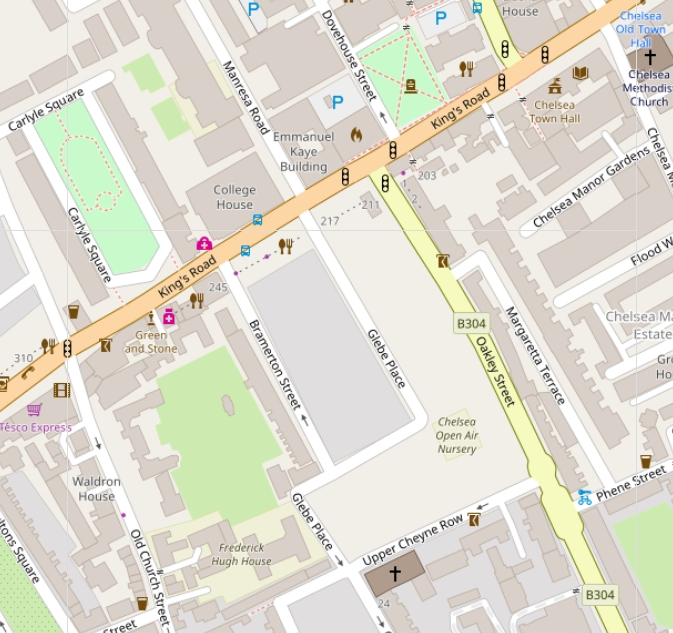
Glebe Place area map

Glebe Place is a street in Chelsea, London. It runs roughly north to south from King's Road to the crossroads with Upper Cheyne Row, where it becomes Cheyne Row, leading down to Cheyne Walk and the River Thames. It also has a junction with Bramerton Street. The street was known as Cook's Ground for some period up to the mid-nineteenth century.

== Notable buildings ==
36, 37 and 38 Glebe Place, an early to mid-19th century terrace are grade II listed houses.

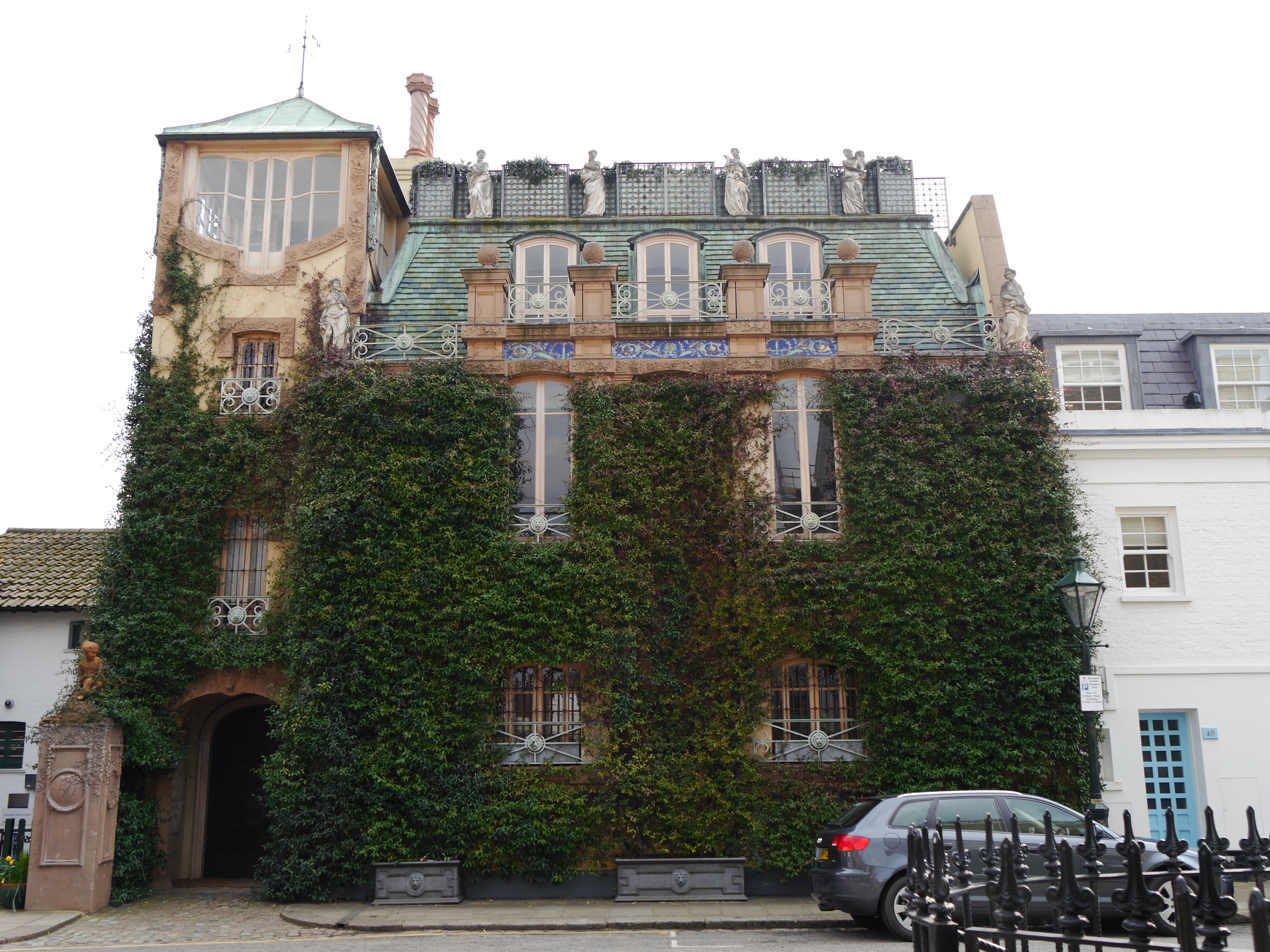
50 Glebe Place

50 Glebe Place looks much older, but was actually built between 1985 and 1987 for the advertiser Frank Lowe and described in The London Compendium as a folly.

Glebe House, with a Georgian facade, but completely rebuilt inside, contains 13 artworks commissioned from the Georgian artist Tamara Kvesitadze.

West House is a Queen Anne revival house at 35 Glebe Place, built in 1868–69 by the architect Philip Webb, on behalf of the artist George Price Boyce.

== Notable residents ==
Several artists have had studios in the street, including Augustus John and Winifred Nicholson. Others have also lived here.

No.1

- Francis Bacon

No.3

- David Jones (artist-poet)
- Tom Burns (publisher)

No.10

- Dora Meeson Also at No.52
- George James Coates. Also at No.52

No.12

- Paul Robeson

No.18

- Vivienne Bennett

No.19

- Vera Brittain with her friend Phyllis Bentley in 1935
- Winifred Holtby
- Elliott Seabrooke
- Sir George Catlin (political scientist)
- Shirley Williams, Baroness Williams

No.25

- Constant Lambert
- George Washington Lambert

No.26

- George Henry (painter)

No.27 Fontana Studios

- Alfred Egerton Cooper
- Leonard Jennings
- Francis Derwent Wood

No.30

- Will Dyson
- Ruby Lindsay
- R O Morris

No.35 West House, Chelsea

- George Price Boyce
- James Guthrie (artist)
- Edward Arthur Walton

No.36

- Antonia White

No.39 Key House

- Maxwell Armfield

No.40, also Key House

- Conrad Dressler. Also kept studios at No.45 Cedar Studios

No.44

- Charles Conder

No.45, Cedar Studios

- John Galsworthy

No.49

- Charles Rennie Mackintosh

No.52

- Dora Meeson and George Coates (from 1906)
- Glyn Philpot
- E. H. Shepard

No. 53 Glebe Studios

- Walter Sickert (before 1894)
- Sir William Rothenstein (1890-1901)

No. 55 Glebe Studios

- George Coates
- Sir Sidney Nolan Australian modernist painter

No.61

- Frederick Henry Townsend

No.64

- William McMillan
- Sir Alfred Munnings

No.66

- Anton Dollo

No.69 Turner Studios

- Frank Lynn Jenkins

No.70

- Mervyn Peake
