= West House, Chelsea =

House in Chelsea, London, England

Coordinates: 51°29′07″N 0°10′16″W

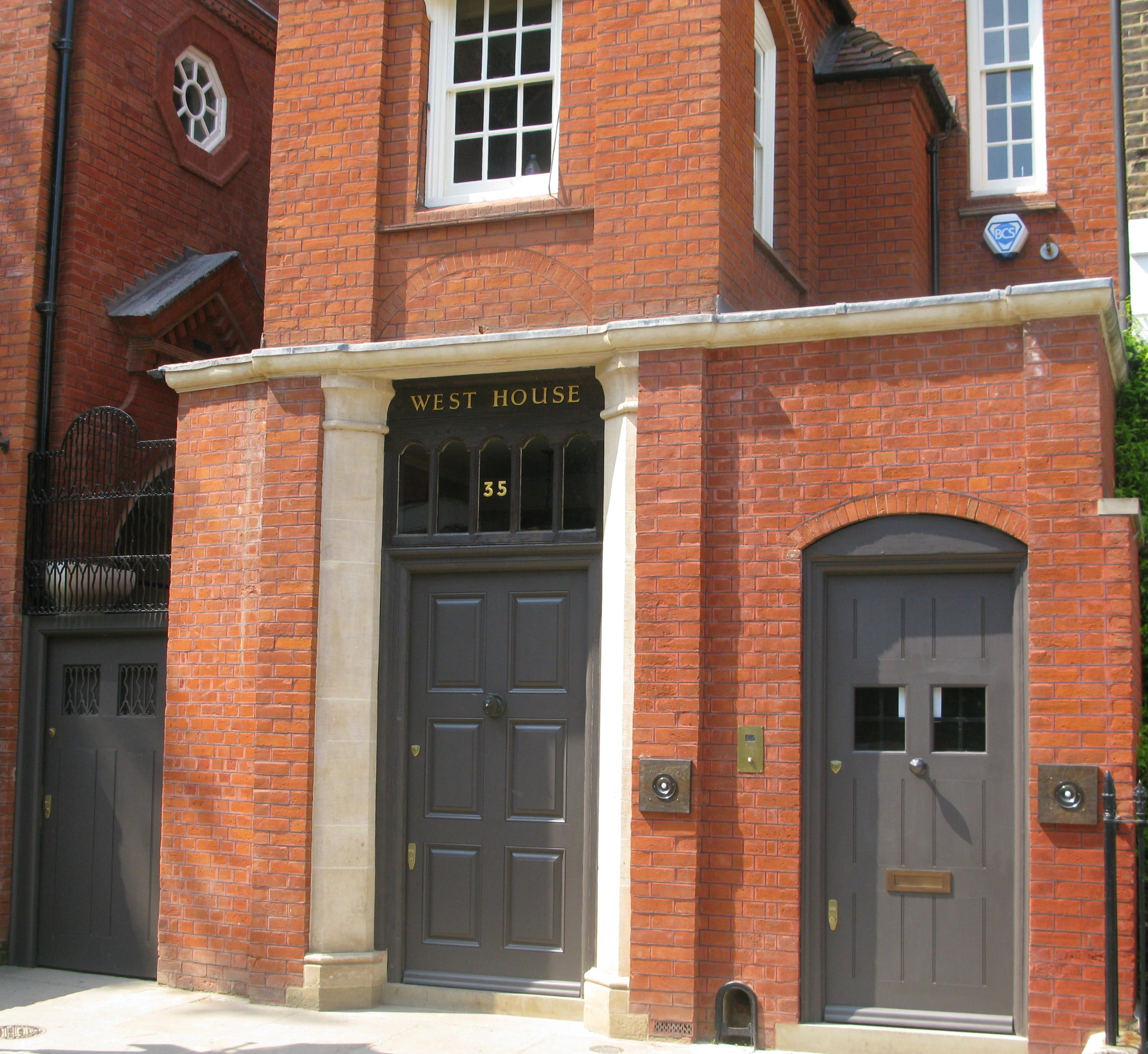
West House

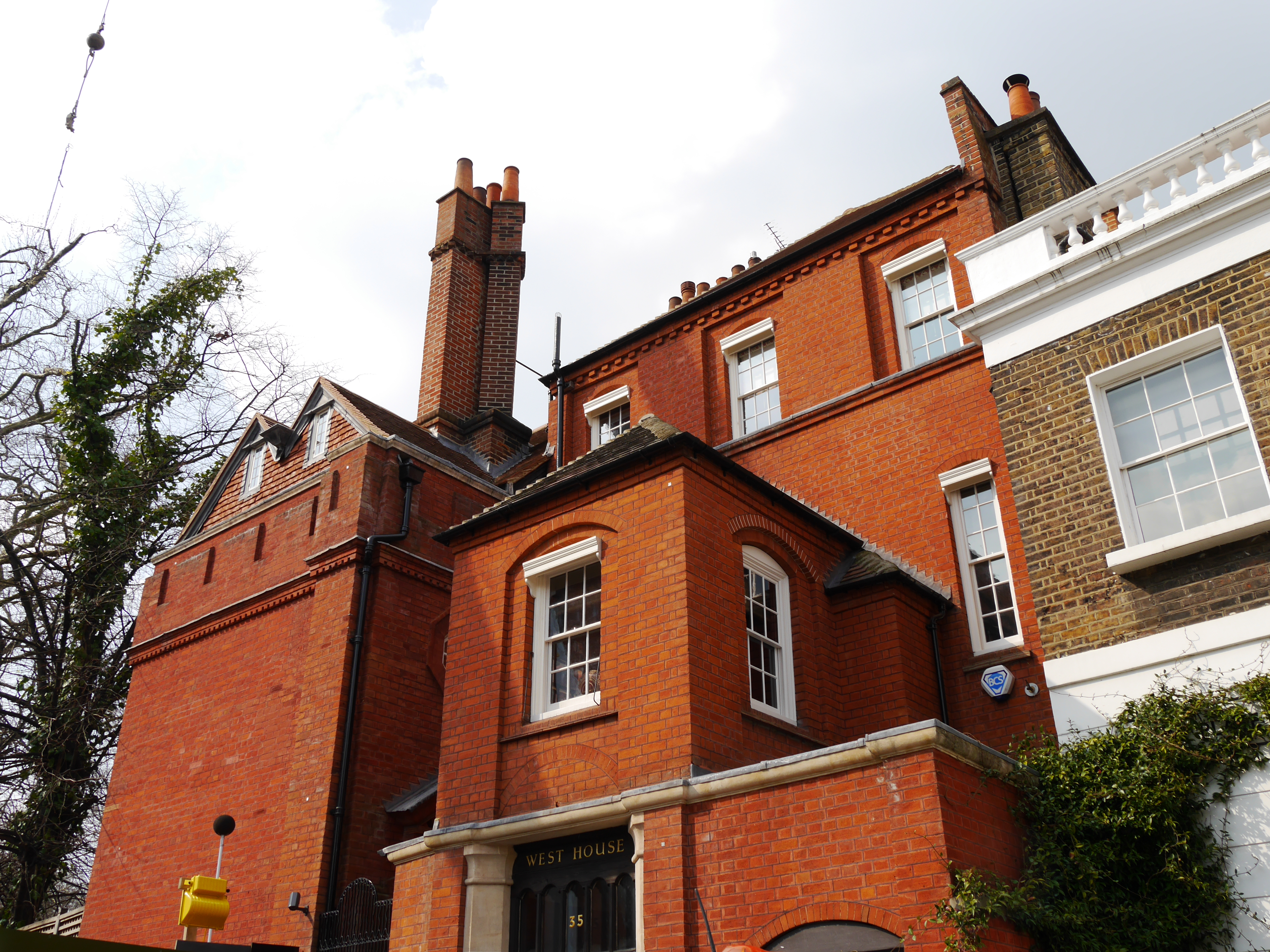
West House

West House is a Grade II* listed Queen Anne revival house at 35 Glebe Place, Chelsea, London. It was built in 1868–69 by the architect Philip Webb, on behalf of the artist George Price Boyce. It was extended in 1876 by Webb, and in 1901 by an unknown architect. Historic England have described West House as "one of the earliest examples of the Queen Anne Revival style". West House possesses one of the few triple-height ceilings in London.

== Residents ==
The house was built for the painter George Price Boyce, who lived there from 1870, and died there in 1897.The reason that there were three doors was because Trades people would enter one and models would enter another with the main door being for the family.

After Boyce's death, Scottish artists James Guthrie (artist) and Edward Arthur Walton occupied West House. Guthrie, one of the Glasgow Boys, who were influenced by Impressionism and who used more realistic and contemporary themes than was usual in Victorian painting, both in his portraiture and landscapes, had his studios there. Walton was a painter of landscapes and portraits.

The designer and academic Bernard Nevill bought the house in 1970 for about £80,000 (£1.1 million as of 2025). Nevil lived there until 2011. Nevill taught at Saint Martin's School of Art, and was Design Director for Liberty of London in the 1960s and 1970s. His paintings, furniture and furnishings, which appeared in the 1987 film Withnail and I were auctioned by Christie's in 2011, and were anticipated to total about £200,000. The sale total was actually £471,400.

West House was bought by the French businessman François Pinault in 2011 for £20 million. In a subsequent planning application, Pinault proposed the "reinstatement of original features such as the main staircase", with the large studio to have new windows added. Additional proposals include the kitchen, bathrooms and bedrooms to be remodelled.

== In popular culture ==
In the 1987 film Withnail and I (portrayed by Richard E. Grant and Paul McGann), the house is Withnail's flamboyantly gay Uncle Monty (Richard Griffiths)' London home.
