= Jane Austen Centre =

Literary museum in Bath, England

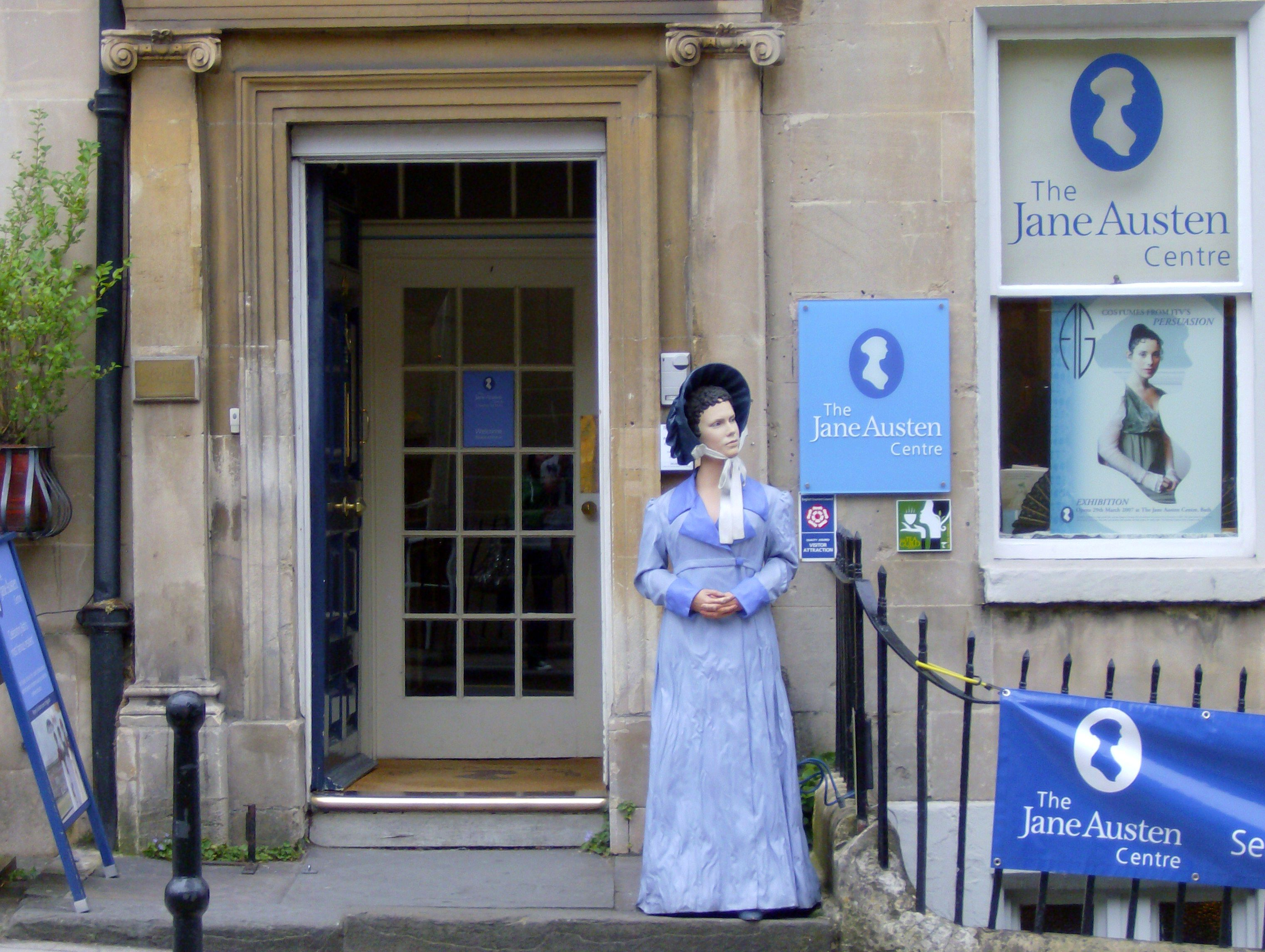

- Location within Somerset

General information
- Location: Bath, England, United Kingdom
- Coordinates: 51.38404°N 2.36316°W

The Jane Austen Centre at 40 Gay Street in Bath, Somerset, England, is a permanent exhibition which tells the story of Jane Austen's Bath experience, and the effect that visiting and living in the city had on her and her writing.

The building is part of a block (31–40 Gay Street) which has been designated by English Heritage as a Grade II listed building.

Since 2001 it has hosted the annual Jane Austen Festival, the largest and longest running Jane Austen Festival in the world. Events include a Summer Ball and a costumed promenade through the centre of Bath.

The centre also has Regency Tea Rooms.

== Waxwork ==
The Waxwork of Jane Austen on display at the centre

The Jane Austen Waxwork is a life size wax model of the author, commissioned by the Jane Austen Centre. It was unveiled at the centre on 9 July 2014 and is currently on public display there. The only verifiable image of her is a small watercolour painted by her sister Cassandra. This, however, has been acknowledged by experts as a 'poor attempt' and was described by her niece as 'hideously unlike' her aunt Jane. At the same time though, there exists many contemporary descriptions of her by friends and it was in this fact that the origin of the sculpture lies.

In 2002, David Baldock, Director of the Jane Austen Centre, commissioned forensic artist Melissa Dring to create a new portrait of Austen, after reading about her work creating a likeness of Vivaldi for a film company, from eye-witness accounts. As David Baldock said: "We were always asked what Jane Austen looked like and in a way the only reference point we had was Jane Austen’s sister, Cassandra’s, very poor watercolour and we didn’t feel it did her justice".

The portrait was unveiled in December 2002. The process was taken a step further in 2011, when the Jane Austen Centre commissioned a three-dimensional, life-size wax figure. Many visitors are often surprised by the size of the wax figure, standing at an impressive 5 ft 8". However, Jane was described in several accounts as being a "tall and slender" woman, and in 21st century measurements, it isn't all that different to today.

Based upon the 2002 portrait, the wax figure's creation was undertaken by the portrait sculptor Mark Richards. During the three-year process it took to create the Jane Austen figure, Richards worked closely with Melissa Dring, along with hair and colour artist Nell Clarke, and designer Andrea Galer. The latter, dressing the completed figure in authentic period costume. The completed figure was unveiled to the world media on Wednesday 9 July 2014, at the Jane Austen Centre; the figure being displayed in a specially created space within the centre.

== See also ==
- Chawton House
- Jane Austen's House Museum
