= At Binsey, near Oxford =

1862 painting by George Price Boyce

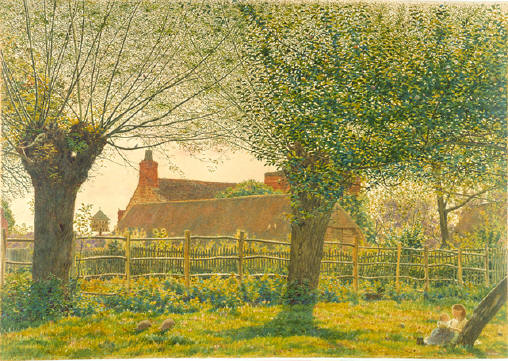
- Artist: George Price Boyce
- Year: 1862
- Location: Bedford; Higgins Art Gallery and Museum

At Binsey, near Oxford is a watercolour by the British Victorian artist George Price Boyce, who was associated with the Pre-Raphaelite art movement.

This 1862 watercolour is a view in the village of Binsey close to the city of Oxford in Oxfordshire, England.

It is in the collection of the Higgins Art Gallery and Museum, Bedford.
