= Andrea Galer =

British costume designer

- Occupation: Costume designer
- Years active: 1973–present
- Awards: BAFTA for Best Costume Design (2005); Primetime Emmy Award for Outstanding Costumes for a Miniseries, Movie, or Special (2006)

Andrea Galer is a British costume designer who works in film and television. She began her first project with the film Don't Look Now (1973), and has spent much of her career since then working in the genre of period film. These include three films related to Jane Austen, and other productions set in the 19th-century including Firelight (1997), Eroica (2003), and The Way We Live Now (2001).

She won the BAFTA for Best Costume Design for her work in the BBC serial Bleak House (2005), and the Primetime Emmy Award for Outstanding Costumes for a Miniseries, Movie, or Special for the BBC serial Jane Eyre (2006).

== Career ==
Galer began her career in the 1970s; she worked in commercial design as well as in costume design, creating outfits for stage, film and television. Designing clothing for the actress Julie Christie led to Galer's first film project, the thriller Don't Look Now (1973), where she collaborated with fellow costume designer Marit Allen. After the project, Galer took a ten-year break from her career to have children, returning in the mid-1980s.

Galer's use of tweed as a fabric in Don't Look Now was repeated in her later projects, including in the British comedy Withnail and I (1987). Withnail and I is now regarded as a cult film, with fans frequently replicating Galer's Harris Tweed coat worn by the titular character (played by Richard E. Grant). She based her design on a riding coat from the 19th-century. The garment's popularity led to its inclusion in a charity auction in 2000 to raise funds for a school in Swaziland that Grant had previously attended, and to replicas being sold on Galer's website.

While working on the period film Firelight (1997) Galer took inspiration from the novel Jane Eyre, explaining that its "script and direction meant that I intentionally tried to create costumes that emphasised the narrative’s resemblance to Jane Eyre". She next designed the costumes in the 1999 film Mansfield Park, an adaptation of the novel by Jane Austen. In the film, Galer dresses the protagonist Fanny Price (played by Frances O'Connor) in practical, dark materials, setting her apart from her frivolous cousins. For research, she studied the time period and then made slight alterations for modern appeal, primarily by making the costumes more flattering with a slimmer silhouette.

In 2001, Galer served as the costume designer for the BBC serial The Way We Live Now, set in England during the late 19th century. Another film project set in the 19th-century was Eroica (2003); her costumes for the film were described by Variety magazine as "both natural and eye-catching". For her work in the BBC serial Bleak House (2005), she won the British Academy Television Craft Award for Best Costume Design and received a nomination for the Primetime Emmy Award for Outstanding Costumes for a Miniseries, Movie, or Special.

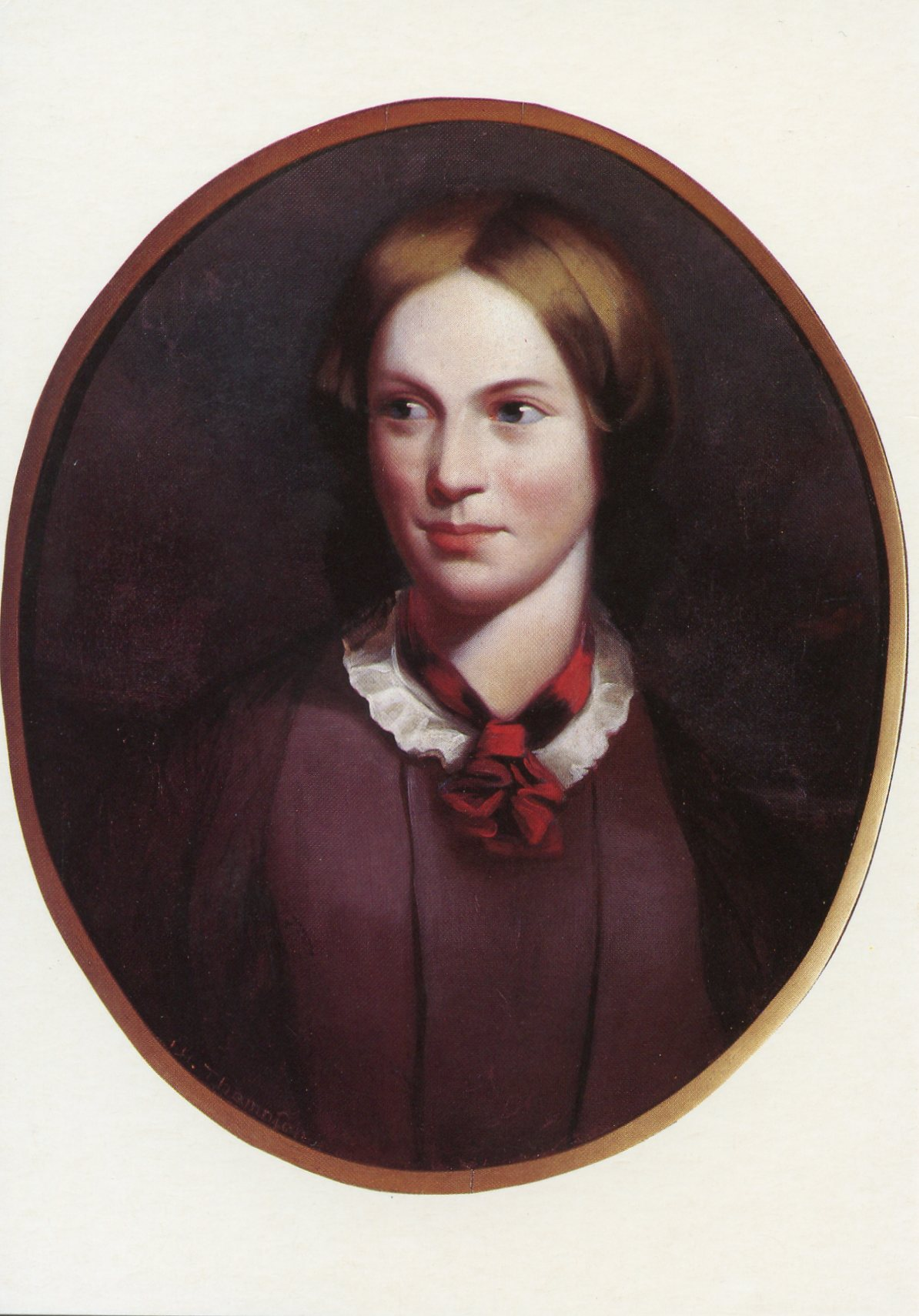
For the BBC miniseries Jane Eyre, Galer took inspiration from J.H. Thompson's portrait of Charlotte Brontë (pictured)

Galer was the costume designer for the 2006 BBC miniseries Jane Eyre, for which she won the Primetime Emmy Award for Outstanding Costumes for a Miniseries, Movie, or Special. In a 2014 retrospective of the production, Galer said she typically performs research for a project by reading books and visiting art galleries and museums. "When you’ve amassed all this material, you put together mood boards and hope that your inspirations will flow across into your costumes," she said. With Jane Eyre, she studied portraits of Charlotte Brontë and was inspired by one of them to dress the titular protagonist (played by Ruth Wilson) in a grey silk dress and a vivid red tie; Galer reflected that she "put the most time and money into this particular costume".

Galer worked on another Austen adaptation, the ITV television film Persuasion, in 2007. Galer chose to dress the protagonist Anne Elliot in simple, understated designs, in contrast with those around her. Her costumes in the film were described by The Hollywood Reporter as being "equally [as] handsome" as its production design.

Galer has also worked as a fashion designer, creating women's suits, evening wear, and fashion collections based on her costume designs. The Guardian describes her style as "based on corsetry and traditional tailoring, [which] her look translates well into film: a model of cross-fertilisation, Galer's contemporary clothing influences her costume, which in turn has an impact on her main collections."

== Personal life ==
In 2005 she visited Sri Lanka to help the women who worked in the country's lace-making industry, which had been devastated by the 2004 tsunami. She founded the Power of Hands Foundation, a charity that supports women in the lace-making profession by offering operational support and advocating for a fair wage. She has used them as a source for fabric in such productions as Jane Eyre and Miss Austen Regrets.

In 2007 Galer publicly criticised television producers for perceived budget cuts in the area of costume design, writing that "people seem to underestimate the contribution of costume to the success of a picture and feel that corners can be cut. Often what is written in the script simply does not tally with what is available in the budget. It means that in future, period productions are really going to struggle". In the early 2010s, she collaborated with the Jane Austen Centre and a forensic artist to design a costume for a wax figure of the famous British author; it went on display to the public in 2014 in Bath, Somerset.

== Select filmography ==
Adapted from:

- Don't Look Now (1973)
- Withnail and I (1987)
- How to Get Ahead in Advertising (1989)
- Love and Death on Long Island (1997)
- Firelight (1997)
- Mansfield Park (1999)
- Cinderella (2000)
- The Way We Live Now (2001)
- Eroica (2003)
- Sherlock Holmes and the Case of the Silk Stocking (2004)
- Bleak House (2005)
- Jane Eyre (2006)
- Persuasion (2007)
- Miss Austen Regrets (2007)
- Agatha Christie's Marple (2008–2009)
- Whitechapel (2012)
- The Lady Vanishes (2013)
- The Politician's Husband (2013)
- Dickensian (2015–2016)
