= Pat Booth =

English novelist, model, photographer and philanthropist

- Pat Booth
- Born: 24 April 1943
- Died: 11 May 2009 (aged 66)
- Occupations: Author; model; photographer

Pat Booth, Lady Lowe (24 April 1943 – 11 May 2009) was an English model, photographer, and author of romantic fiction.

== Biography ==
Raised in the East End of London by a boxer father and an ambitious mother, Booth posed for such photographers as Norman Parkinson, Allen Jones and David Bailey in the 1960s. Famously, she was the model for Allen Jones' "table", a woman on all fours bearing a plate glass tabletop on her back. She later became a photographer herself, taking pictures of such well-known figures as David Bowie and Bianca Jagger, Jean-Claude Duvalier as well as Queen Elizabeth II and the Queen Mother.

Her work has been displayed in the National Portrait Gallery and in The Sunday Times and Cosmopolitan. In the 1980s she turned her hand to writing racy and glitzy romance novels, partly inspired by her own glamorous lifestyle. She was published in both the U.S. and the UK.

She was, however, also a devout Roman Catholic and regular churchgoer. She provided assistance to women who became pregnant, but were unable to support a child.

Booth's first husband, Garth Wood, a doctor, committed suicide in 2001. The marriage produced a son, Orlando Wood; they also had an adopted daughter, Camelia Wood. She remarried, to Sir Frank Lowe, in 2008 in a ceremony attended by good friend Pattie Boyd.

Booth died from lung cancer in a London hospital on 11 May 2009, aged 66.

== Partial bibliography ==
- Lady and the Champ (1980)
- Rags to Riches (1981)
- Master Photographers: The World's Great Photographers on Their Art and Technique (1983)
- Self Portrait (1983)
- Sparklers (1983)
- The Big Apple (1984)
- Palm Beach (1985)
- The Sisters (1987)
- Beverly Hills (1989)
- Malibu (1990)
- Miami (1991)
- All for Love (1993)
- Marry Me (1996)
- American Icon (1998)
- Temptation (1998)
- Nashville (2000)
