= 50 Glebe Place =

House in Chelsea, London

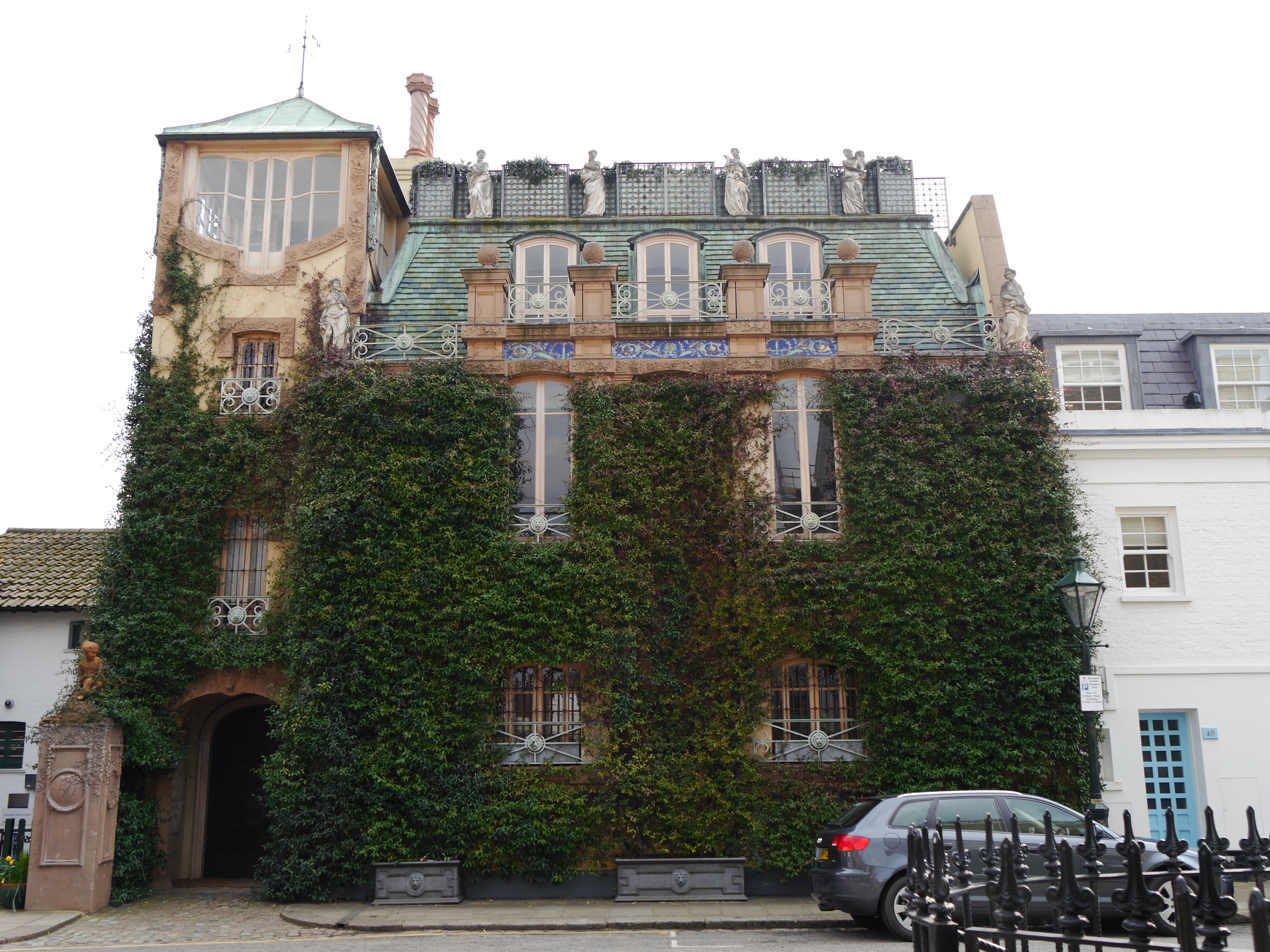
- The house in 2014

- Location within Greater London

General information
- Location: Chelsea, London, England
- Coordinates: 51.4852°N 0.1696°W
- Year built: 1985–1987
- Client: Frank Lowe

50 Glebe Place is a large terraced house on Glebe Place in the Chelsea SW3 district of London, England. It was built between 1985 and 1987 for the advertiser Frank Lowe. Ed Glinert, in The London Compendium, described it as a folly.

== Architecture ==
The London: North West volume of the Pevsner Architectural Guides describes the building as having a "tall eclectic entrance tower". The main structure has three storeys, with the upper floor set within the roof space, and it includes a roof garden. The tower rises to four storeys, with windows on each level and a weather vane above its pitched roof. The building is notable for the six statues on its mansard roof, each one different, with four placed along the ridge and two positioned lower down at the sides. There is also a terracotta figure of a seated girl on a pillar beside the entrance. The roof is tiled in a multi-coloured chevron pattern. Metalwork is used extensively on the window fronts and for drainage, and there is a three-part painted panel at the base of the roof.

== Gallery ==
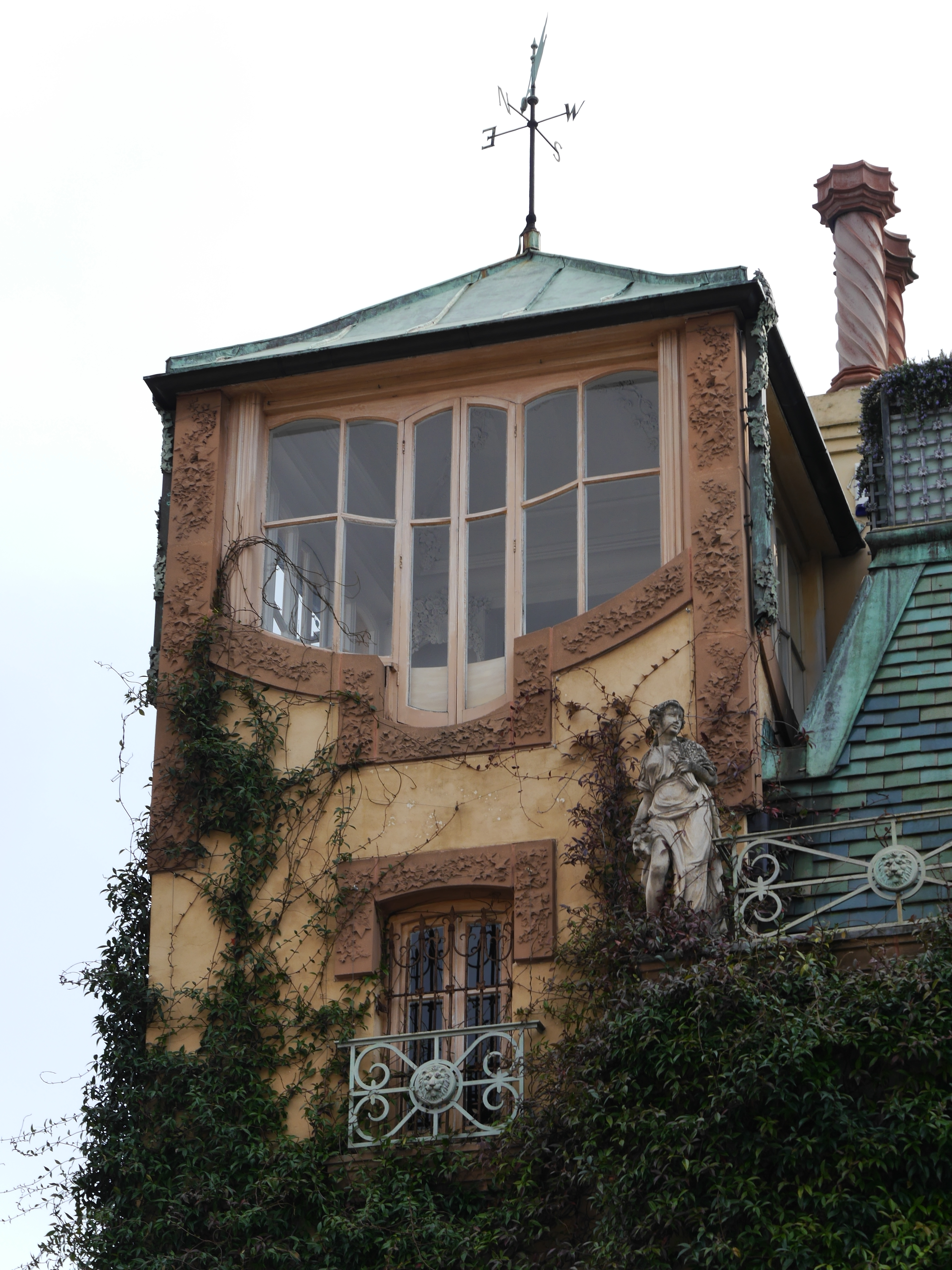
Tower

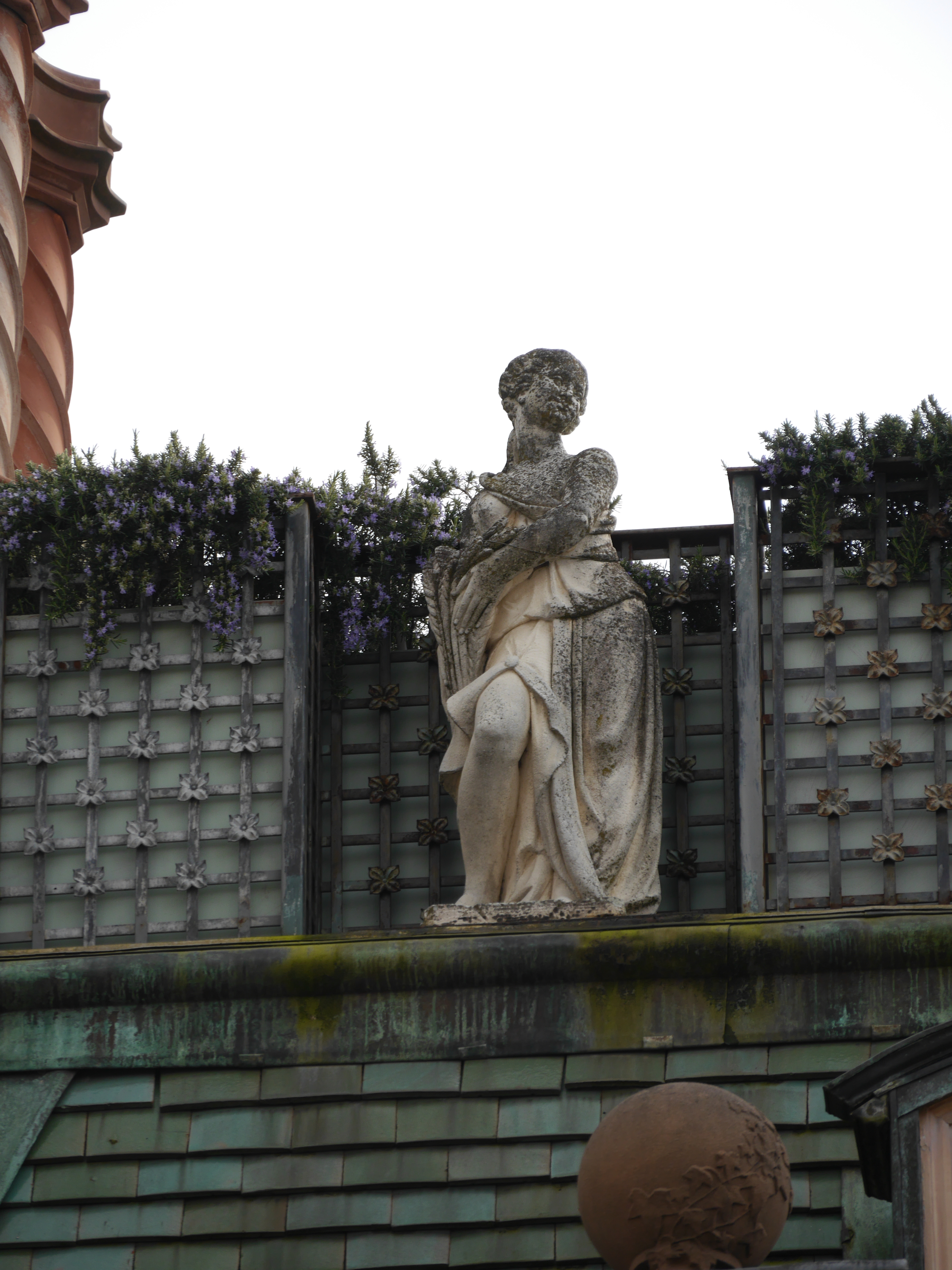
Statue at roof level

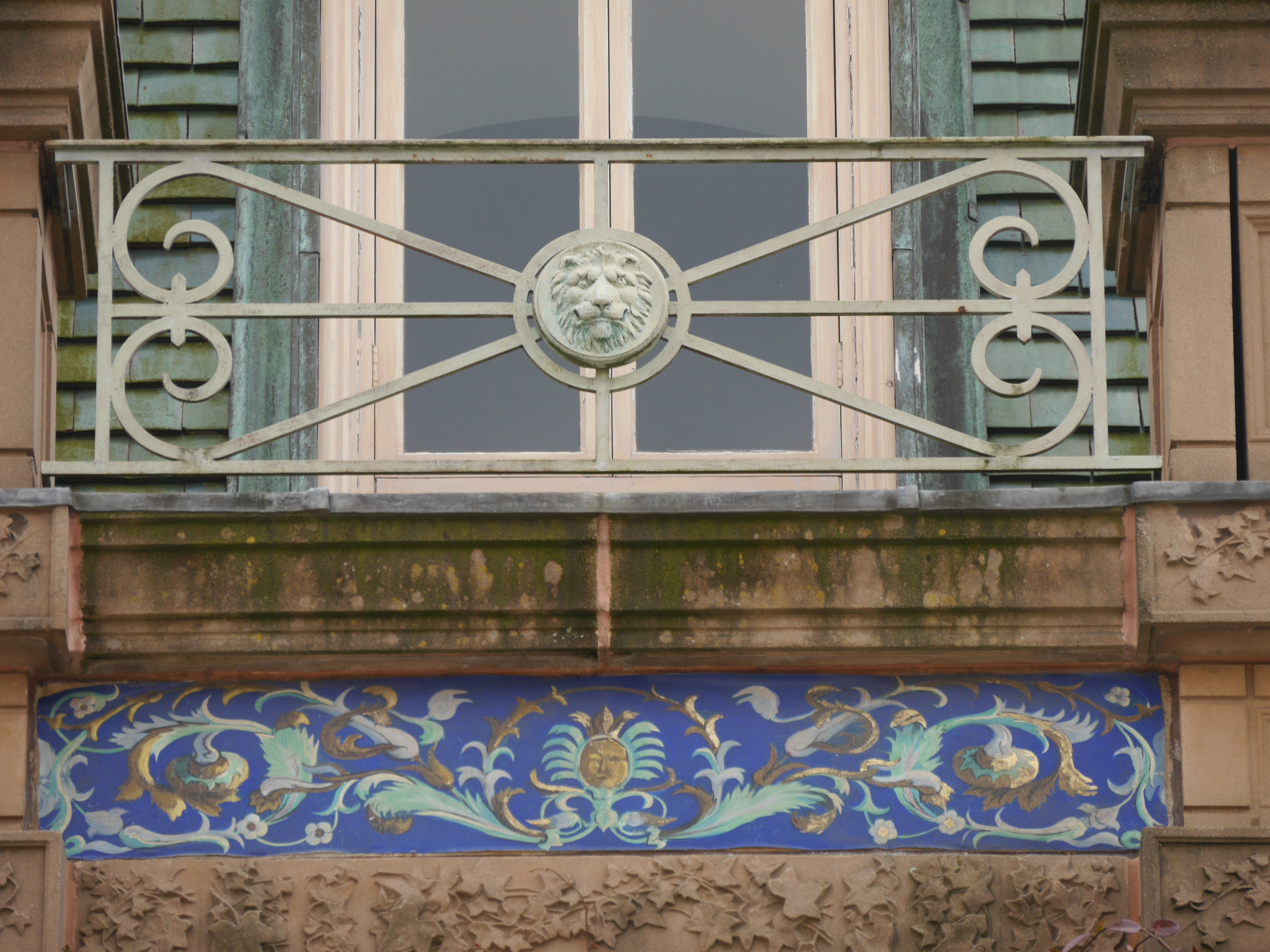
Painted design at roof level

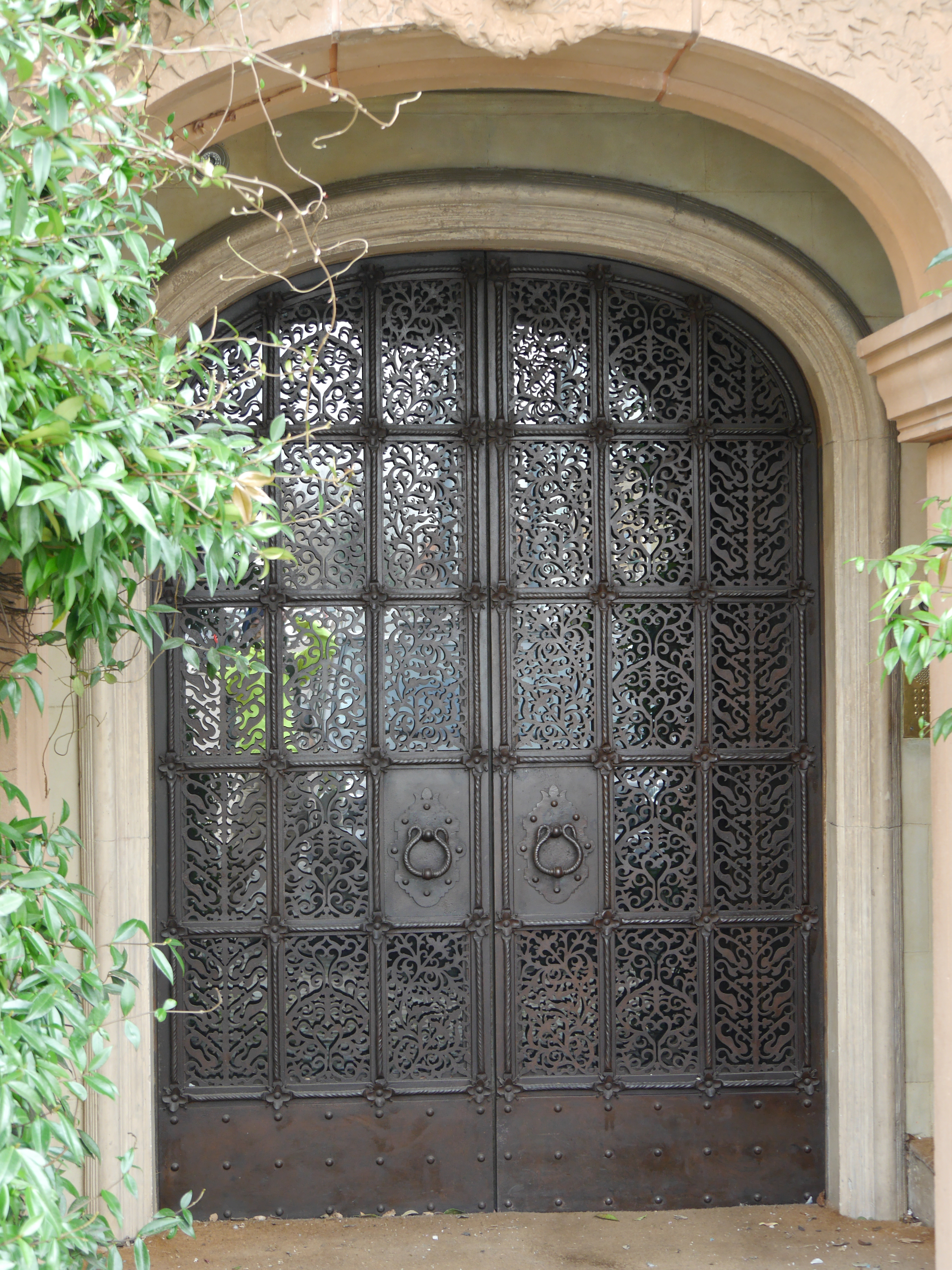
Doorway

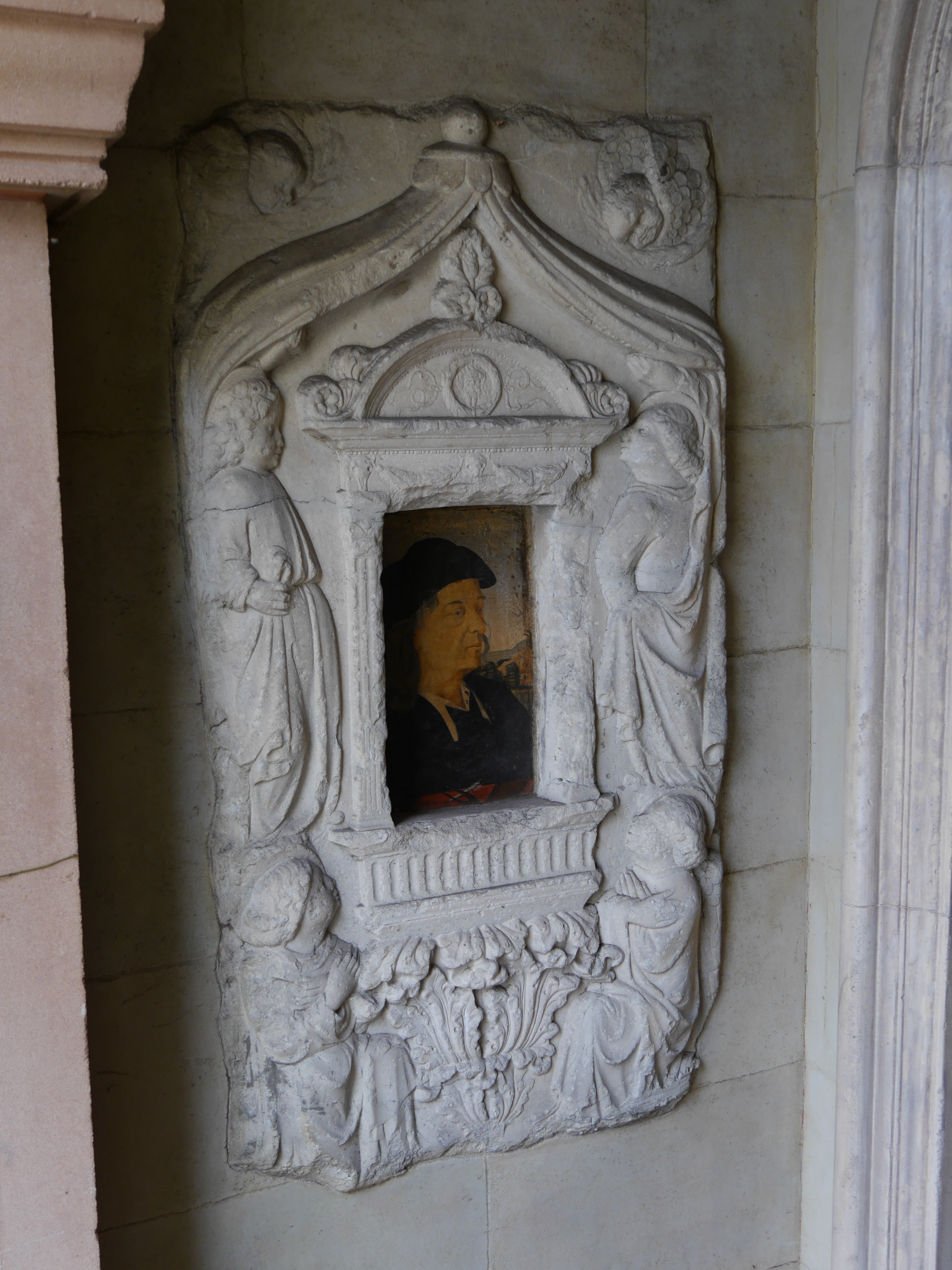
Relief with inset in doorway
