= Withnail and I =

1987 British film by Bruce Robinson

- Original release poster by Ralph Steadman
- Directed by: Bruce Robinson
- Written by: Bruce Robinson
- Produced by: Paul Heller
- Starring: Paul McGann; Richard E. Grant; Richard Griffiths
- Cinematography: Peter Hannan
- Edited by: Alan Strachan
- Music by: David Dundas; Rick Wentworth
- Distributed by: HandMade Films
- Release date: 1 January 1987 (United Kingdom)
- Running time: 107 minutes
- Country: United Kingdom
- Language: English
- Budget: £1.1 million (Note: About $1.6 million at average USD/GBP for 1987. About £3 million at 2020 prices)
- Box office: $2 million

Withnail and I is a 1987 British black comedy film written and directed by Bruce Robinson in his directorial debut. Loosely based on Robinson's life in London in the late 1960s, the plot follows two unemployed actors, Withnail and "I" (Richard E. Grant and Paul McGann, respectively), who share a flat in Camden Town in 1969. They plan a weekend holiday at a Lake District cottage owned by Withnail's wealthy eccentric uncle Monty (Richard Griffiths), though the holiday proves less recuperative than expected.

Withnail and I was Grant's film debut and breakout role. Featuring supporting performances by Griffiths, Ralph Brown and Michael Elphick, the film is notable for its 1960s soundtrack and many quotable lines. It has been described as "one of Britain's biggest cult films".

The character "I" is named "Marwood" in the published screenplay but goes unnamed in the film credits.

== Plot ==
In September 1969, two unemployed young actors, flamboyant alcoholic Withnail and contemplative, neurotic Marwood, live in a squalid flat in Camden Town, London. Their only regular visitor is their drug dealer, Danny. One morning, the pair squabble about housekeeping and then leave for a stroll. In Regent's Park, they discuss the poor state of their acting careers and the desire for a holiday; Marwood proposes a trip to a rural cottage near Penrith owned by Withnail's wealthy uncle Monty. They visit Monty that evening at his luxurious Chelsea house. Monty is a melodramatic aesthete, whom Marwood infers is homosexual. The three briefly drink together as Withnail casually lies to Monty about his acting career. He further deceives Monty by implying that Marwood attended Eton College ("the other place"), whilst a lithograph of Harrow School seen earlier in the flat suggests that both Monty and Withnail were educated there. Withnail persuades his uncle to lend them the cottage key and they leave.

Withnail and Marwood drive to the cottage the next day but find the weather cold and wet, the cottage without provisions and the locals unwelcoming—in particular a poacher, Jake, whom Withnail offends in the pub. Marwood becomes anxious when he later sees Jake prowling around the cottage and suggests they leave for London the next day. Withnail in turn demands that they share a bed in the interest of safety but Marwood refuses. During the night, Withnail fears that the poacher wants to harm them and climbs under the covers with Marwood, who angrily leaves for a different bed. Hearing the sounds of an intruder breaking into the cottage, Withnail again joins Marwood in bed. The intruder turns out to be Monty, with supplies.

The next day, Marwood realises Monty's visit has ulterior motives when he makes suggestive sexual advances upon him; Withnail seems oblivious to this. Monty drives them into town and gives them money to buy Wellington boots but they go to a pub instead, and then to a small cafe where they cause a disturbance. Monty is annoyed that they misused the money, but he forgets the offence as the three drink and play poker. Marwood is terrified by the thought of Monty's further sexual overtures and wants to leave immediately, but Withnail insists on staying the night. Late in the night, Marwood tries to avoid Monty's company but is eventually cornered in the guest bedroom as Monty demands sex, threatening to rape Marwood. Monty also reveals that Withnail, during the visit in London, told him that Marwood was a closet homosexual. After initially denying that, which does not satisfy Monty, Marwood then lies that Withnail is the closeted one and that the two of them are in a committed relationship, which Withnail wishes to keep secret from his family and that this is the first night in six years that they have not slept together. Monty, a romantic, is persuaded by this explanation and leaves after apologising for coming between them. In private, Marwood furiously confronts Withnail.

The next morning, they find Monty has left for London, leaving a note wishing them happiness together. They continue to argue. A telegram arrives from Marwood's agent with a possible offer of work and he insists they return. As Marwood sleeps in the car, a drunken Withnail speeds and drives recklessly until pulled over by police who arrest and charge him for driving under the influence. The pair return to the flat to find Danny and a friend named Presuming Ed squatting. Marwood calls his agent and discovers he is wanted for the lead part in a play but will need to move to Manchester to take it. The four share a huge cannabis joint but the celebration ends when Marwood learns they have received an eviction notice for unpaid rent, while Withnail is too high to care. Marwood—with a new short haircut—packs a bag to leave for the railway station. He turns down Withnail's offer of a goodbye drink, but Withnail insists on walking with him to the station. In Regent's Park, Marwood asks Withnail not to walk with him further; the two express that they will miss each other, and then Marwood leaves. Alone with a bottle of wine in hand, Withnail performs "What a piece of work is a man!" from Hamlet to the wolves in a London Zoo enclosure, and then turns to walk unsteadily home in the rain.

== Cast ==
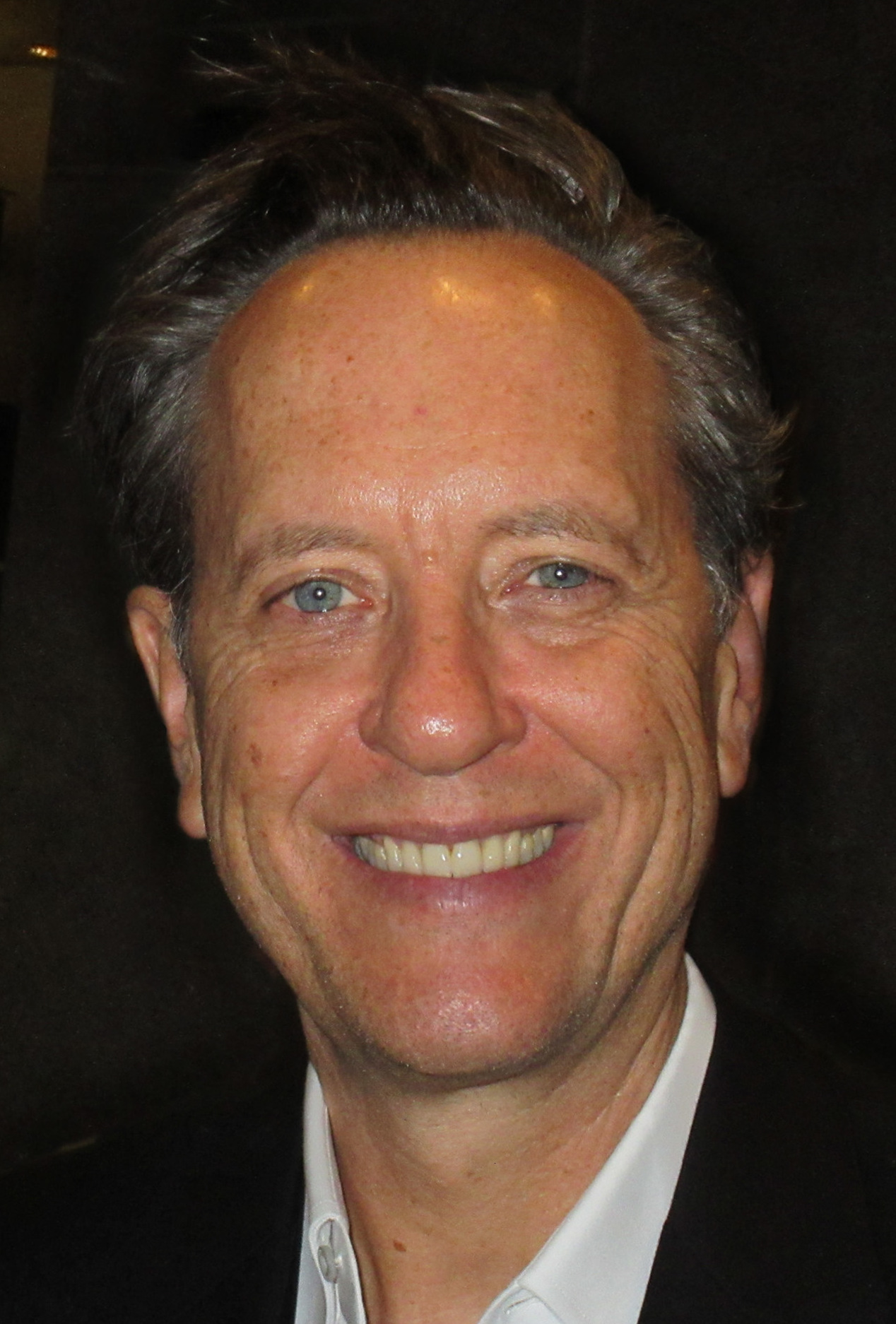
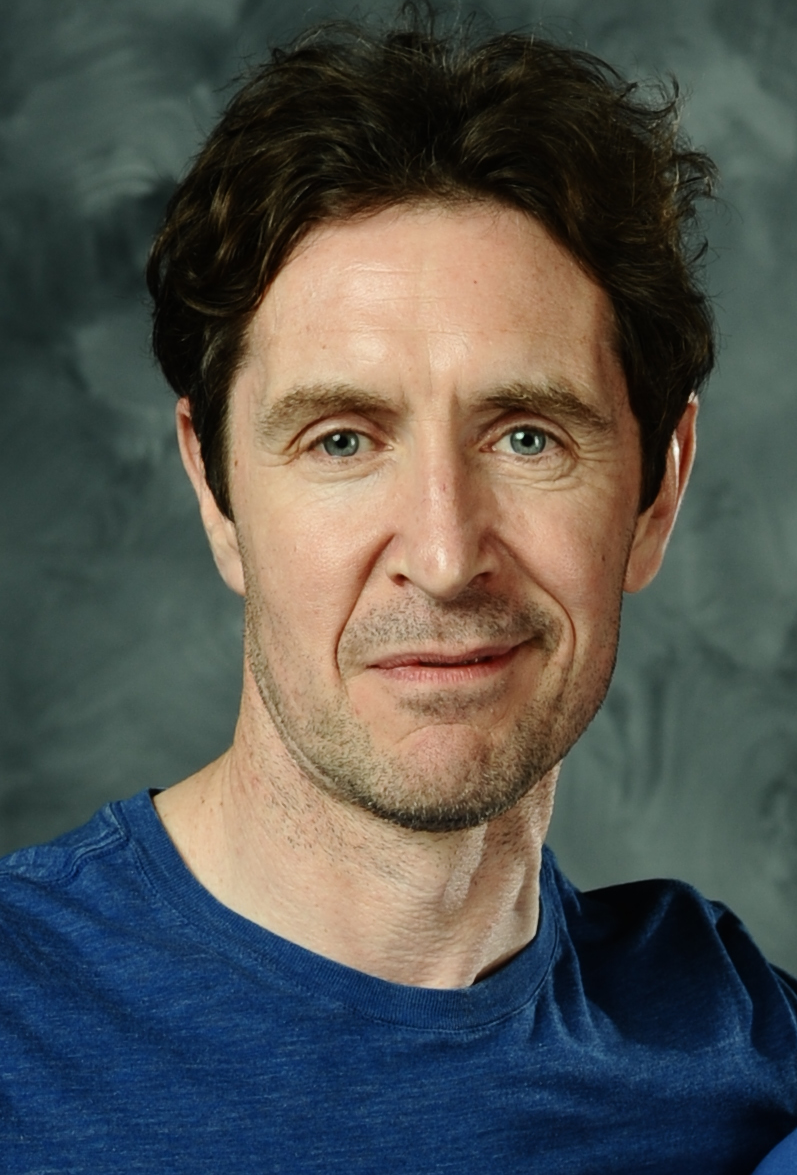
Richard E. Grant and Paul McGann play the title roles of Withnail and "I" respectively.
- Richard E. Grant as Withnail
- Paul McGann as "I" (Marwood)
- Richard Griffiths as Monty (Montague H. Withnail)
- Ralph Brown as Danny
- Michael Elphick as Jake
- Daragh O'Malley as Irishman (aggressive pub visitor)
- Michael Wardle as Isaac Parkin (farmer)
- Una Brandon-Jones as Mrs Parkin
- Noel Johnson as General (bar owner)
- Irene Sutcliffe as Miss Blennerhassit, Tea Shop Waitress
- Llewellyn Rees as Tea Shop Proprietor
- Robert Oates as Policeman 1
- Anthony Wise as Policeman 2
- Eddie Tagoe as Presuming Ed

== Production ==
=== Development ===
==== Writing ====
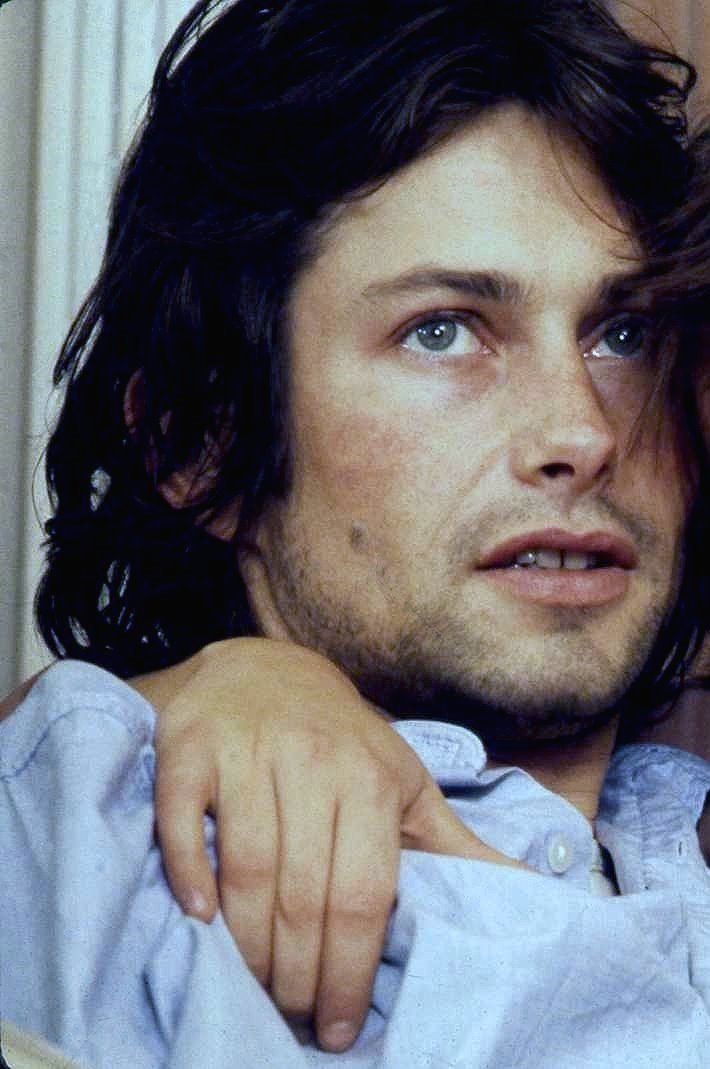
Writer-director Bruce Robinson in 1979

The film is an adaptation of an unpublished novel written by Robinson in 1969–1970 (an early draft of which sold at auction for £8,125 in 2015). Actor friend Don Hawkins (who had starred in the 1970 film Tam Lin with Robinson) passed a copy of the manuscript to his friend Mordecai (Mody) Schreiber in 1980. Schreiber paid Robinson £20,000 to adapt it into a screenplay, which Robinson did in the early 1980s. When meeting Schreiber in Los Angeles, Robinson expressed concern that he might not be able to continue because the writing broke basic screenplay rules and was hard to make work as a film. It used colloquial English to which few Americans would connect ("Give me a tanner and I'll give him a bell"), characters in dismal circumstances, and a plot prodded by uncinematic voice-overs. Schreiber told him that that was precisely what he wanted. On completing the script, producer Paul Heller urged Robinson to direct it and found funding for half the film. The script was then passed to HandMade Films and George Harrison agreed to fund the remainder of the film. Robinson's script is largely autobiographical. "Marwood" is Robinson; "Withnail" is based on Vivian MacKerrell, a friend with whom he shared a Camden house and "Uncle Monty" is loosely based on Franco Zeffirelli, from whom Robinson received unwanted amorous attentions when he was a young actor. He lived in the impoverished conditions seen in the film and wore plastic bags as Wellington boots. For the script, Robinson condensed two or three years of his life into two or three weeks. Robinson stated he named the character of Withnail after a childhood acquaintance named Jonathan Withnall, who was "the coolest guy I had ever met in my life".

Early in the film, Withnail reads a newspaper headline "Boy lands plum role for top Italian director" and suggests that the director is sexually abusing the boy. This is a reference to the sexual harassment that Robinson alleges he suffered at the hands of Zeffirelli when, at age 21, he won the role of Benvolio in Romeo and Juliet. Robinson attributed Uncle Monty's question to Marwood ("Are you a sponge or a stone?") as a direct quotation of Zeffirelli. The headline "Nude au pair's secret life" was an actual headline from News of the World on 16 November 1969.

The end of the novel saw Withnail committing suicide by pouring a bottle of wine into the barrel of Monty's shotgun and then pulling the trigger as he drank from it. Robinson changed the ending, as he believed it was "too dark".

==== Name of "I" ====
"Marwood"? A telegram arrives at Crow Crag (named High Cragg on the envelope).

While the name of McGann's character is never spoken in the film, in the screenplay it is "Marwood". The name "Marwood" is used by Robinson in interviews and in writing as well as by Grant and McGann in the 1999 Channel 4 documentary short Withnail and Us. The name "Marwood" was known to film critic Vincent Canby of the New York Times in a 27 March 1987 review coinciding with the film's New York premiere at the New Directors/New Films series at the Museum of Modern Art. In the end credits and most media relating to the film, McGann's character is referred to solely as "...& I". In the supplemental material packaged with the Special Edition DVD in the UK, McGann's character is referred to as Peter Marwood in the cast credits.

It has been suggested that it is possible that 'Marwood' can be heard near the beginning of the film: As the characters escape from the Irishman in the Mother Black Cap, Withnail shouts "Out of my way <indistinct word>!". Some hear this line as "Out of the way, Marwood!", although the script reads simply "Get out of my way!".

The first name of "I" is not stated anywhere in the film. A myth that it is "Peter" arose as a result of a line of misheard dialogue. In the scene where Monty meets the two actors, Withnail asks him if he would like a drink. In his reply, Monty both accepts his offer and says "...you must tell me all the news, I haven't seen you since you finished your last film". While pouring another drink, and downing his own, Withnail replies that he has been "Rather busy uncle. TV and stuff". Then pointing at Marwood he says "He's just had an audition for rep". Some hear this line as "Peter's had an audition for rep", although the original shooting script and all commercially published versions of the script read "he's".

Towards the end of the film, a telegram arrives at Crow Crag on which the name "Marwood" is partially visible.

=== Pre-production ===
Peter Frampton worked as make-up artist, Sue Love as hair stylist and Andrea Galer as costume designer.

==== Casting ====
Mary Selway worked as casting director.

McGann was Robinson's first choice for "I" but he was fired during rehearsals because Robinson decided McGann's Scouse (Liverpool) accent was wrong for the character. Several other actors read for the role but McGann eventually persuaded Robinson to re-audition him, promising to affect a Home Counties accent and quickly won back the part.

Actors Robinson considered for "Withnail" included Daniel Day-Lewis, Bill Nighy, Kenneth Branagh and Edward Tudor-Pole. Robinson claims that Grant was too fat to play Withnail and told him that "half of you has got to go". Grant has denied this.

Though he plays a raging alcoholic, Grant is a teetotaller with an allergy to alcohol. He had never been drunk prior to making the film. Robinson decided that it would be impossible for Grant to play the character without having ever experienced inebriation and a hangover, so he "forced" the actor on a drinking binge. Grant has stated that he was "violently sick" after each drink and found the experience deeply unpleasant.

=== Filming ===
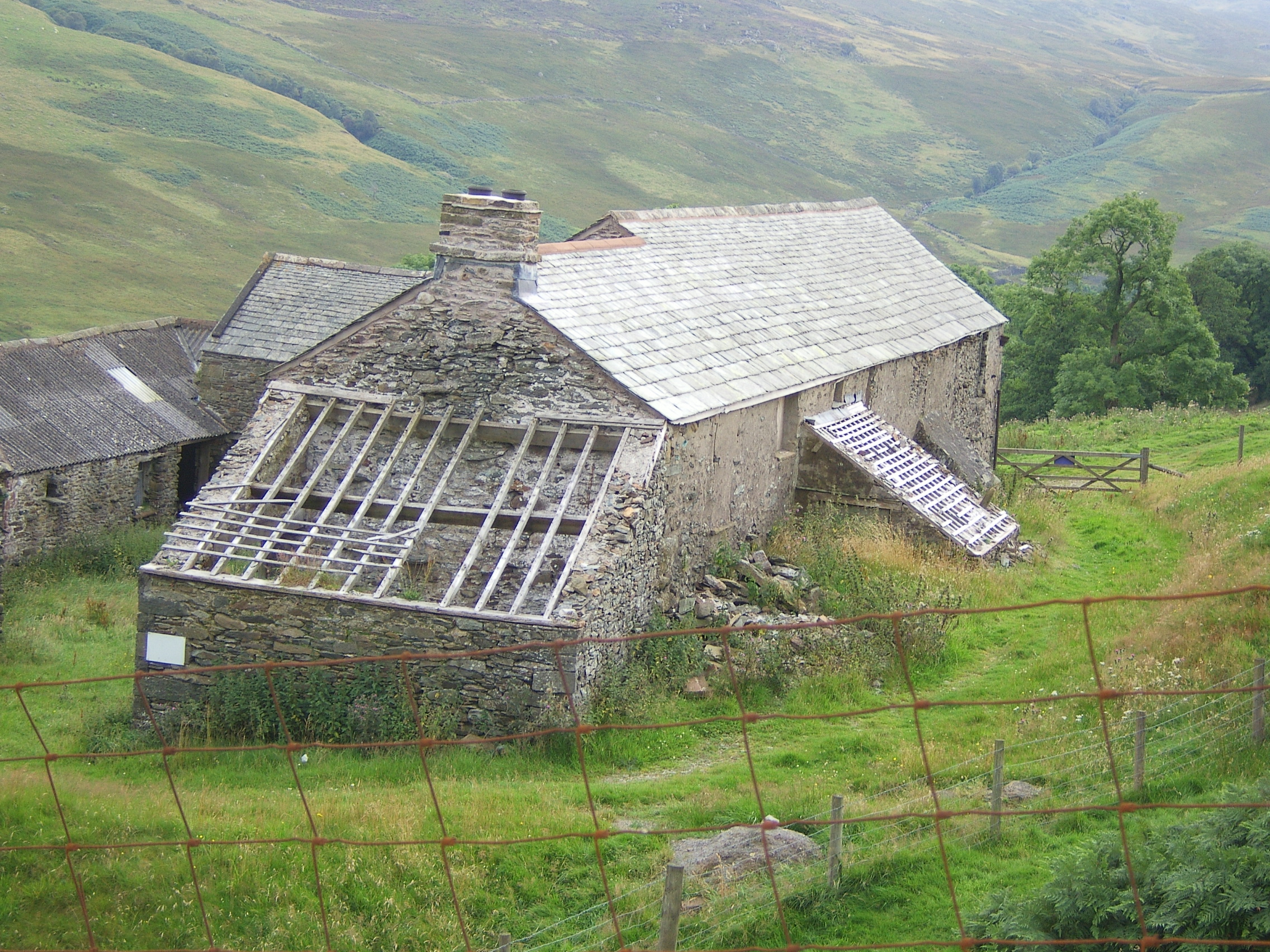
Sleddale Hall, the location used as Monty's cottage. This photo dates from 2007. The hall was restored in 2011–2012.

According to Grant's book, With Nails, filming commenced on 2 August 1986 in the Lake District and shooting took seven weeks. A rough cut was screened to the actors in a Wardour Street screening room on 8 December 1986. Denis O'Brien, who oversaw the filming on behalf of HandMade Films, nearly shut the film down on the first day of production. He thought that the film had no "discernible jokes" and was badly lit. During the filming of the scene in which Withnail drinks a can of lighter fluid, Robinson changed the contents of the can between takes from water to vinegar to get a better reaction from Grant. The film cost £1.1 million to make. Robinson received £80,000 to direct, £30,000 of which he reinvested into the film to shoot additional scenes such as the journeys to and from Penrith, which HandMade Films would not fund. The money was never reimbursed after the film's success. Ringo Starr is credited as a "Special Production Consultant" under his legal name, Richard Starkey MBE.

==== Cumbria ====
The film was shot almost entirely on location. There was no filming in the real Penrith; the locations used were in and around nearby Shap and Bampton, Cumbria. Monty's cottage, Crow Crag, is Sleddale Hall, near the Wet Sleddale Reservoir just outside Shap, although the lake that Crow Crag apparently overlooks is Haweswater Reservoir. The bridge where Withnail and Marwood go fishing with a shotgun is over the River Lowther. The telephone box in which Withnail calls his agent is beside Wideworth Farm Road in Bampton.

Sleddale Hall was offered for sale in January 2009 with a starting price of £145,000. Sebastian Hindley, who owns the Mardale Inn in Bampton, won the auction at a price of £265,000 but he failed to secure financing and the property was resold for an undisclosed sum to Tim Ellis, an architect from Kent, whose original bid failed at the auction.

==== Hertfordshire ====
Exterior and ground floor interior shots of Crow Crag were shot at Sleddale Hall in Cumbria and Stockers Farm in Rickmansworth, Hertfordshire, and the bedroom and stair scenes of Crow Crag were also filmed in Hertfordshire. Stockers Farm was also the location for the Crow and Crown pub.

==== Buckinghamshire ====
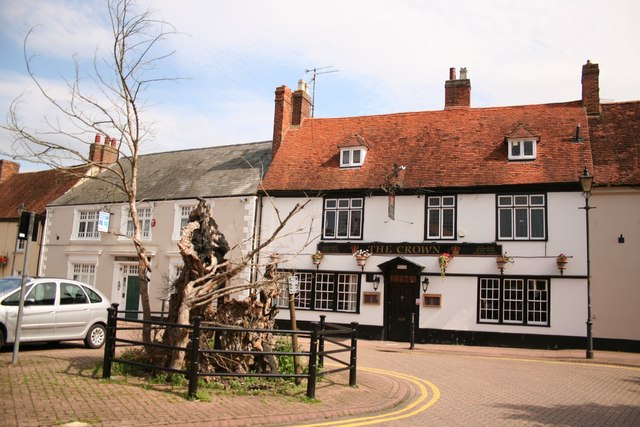
"The King Henry" played by the Crown Inn. The great elm tree outside the pub and shown in the film subsequently died of Dutch Elm Disease and has been replaced.

The King Henry pub and the Penrith Tea Rooms scenes were filmed in the Market Square in Stony Stratford, Milton Keynes, Buckinghamshire, at what is now The Crown Inn Stony Stratford and Cox & Robinson pharmacy, respectively.

==== London ====
Withnail and Marwood's flat was located at 57 Chepstow Place in Bayswater, W2; a well-known photograph of Grant and McGann sitting on the steps of the flat, used in some international posters, was actually taken on the steps of No.55, next door. The shot of them leaving for Penrith as they turn left from the building being demolished was shot on Freston Road, W11. The Mother Black Cap pub was played by the Frog and Firkin pub at 41 Tavistock Crescent, Westbourne Green, Notting Hill. For some time after the film, the pub was renamed the Mother Black Cap, though it was sold and renamed several times before being demolished in 2010–2011. The cafe where Marwood has breakfast at the beginning of the film is located at the corner of 136 Lancaster Road, W11 near the corner with Ladbroke Grove. The scene where the police order Withnail and Marwood to "get in the back of the van" was filmed on the flyover near John Aird Court, Paddington. Uncle Monty's house is actually the West House, Glebe Place, Chelsea, SW3, owned by Bernard Nevill.

==== Shepperton ====
The police station interior was shot at Shepperton Studios.

== Music ==
The film score was composed by David Dundas and Rick Wentworth. The film features a rare appearance of a recording by the Beatles, whose 1968 song "While My Guitar Gently Weeps" plays as the titular duo return to London and find Presuming Ed in the bath. The song, written and sung by George Harrison, was able to be included in the soundtrack due to Harrison's involvement as a producer.

1. "A Whiter Shade of Pale" (live) – King Curtis – 5:25
2. "The Wolf" – David Dundas and Rick Wentworth – 1:33
3. "All Along the Watchtower" (reduced tempo) – The Jimi Hendrix Experience – 4:10
4. "To the Crow" – David Dundas and Rick Wentworth – 2:22
5. "Voodoo Child (Slight Return)" (live) – The Jimi Hendrix Experience – 4:28
6. "While My Guitar Gently Weeps" – The Beatles – 4:44
7. "Marwood Walks" – David Dundas and Rick Wentworth – 2:14
8. "Monty Remembers" – David Dundas and Rick Wentworth – 2:02
9. "La Fite" – David Dundas and Rick Wentworth – 1:10
10. "Hang Out the Stars in Indiana" – Al Bowlly and New Mayfair Dance Orchestra – 1:35
11. "Crow Crag" – David Dundas and Rick Wentworth – 0:56
12. "Cheval Blanc" – David Dundas and Rick Wentworth – 1:15
13. "My Friend" – Charlie Kunz – 1:28
14. "Withnail's Theme" – David Dundas and Rick Wentworth – 2:40

== Reception ==
On review aggregator Rotten Tomatoes, the film has an approval rating of 84% based on 85 reviews, with an average rating of 7.80/10. The website's critical consensus reads, "Richard E. Grant and Paul McGann prove irresistibly hilarious as two misanthropic slackers in Withnail and I, a biting examination of artists living on the fringes of prosperity and good taste."

Film critic Roger Ebert added the film to his Great Movies list, describing Grant's performance as a "tour de force" and Withnail as "one of the iconic figures in modern films".

Robinson won the Best Screenplay award at the 1988 Evening Standard British Film Awards.

== Legacy ==
It is widely regarded as being one of the greatest British films ever made, and its influence has been cited by several filmmakers as directly inspiring their work, among them Shane Black's The Nice Guys, James Ponsoldt's The End of the Tour, Todd Sklar's Awful Nice, Jay and Mark Duplass's Jeff, Who Lives at Home, John Bryant's The Overbrook Brothers, David Gordon Green's Pineapple Express, Alexander Payne's Sideways, and Tom DiCillo's Box of Moonlight.

In 1999, the British Film Institute voted Withnail and I the 29th greatest British film of all time. In 2001, Withnail and I was ranked 38th in Channel 4's 100 Greatest Films poll. In 2008, the film was ranked number 118 in Empire's 500 Greatest Films of All Time list. A 2009 poll by The Guardian among film critics and filmmakers voted it the second best British film of the previous 25 years. In 2011, Time Out London named it the seventh-greatest comedy film of all time. In a 2014 poll, readers of Empire voted Withnail and I the 92nd greatest film.

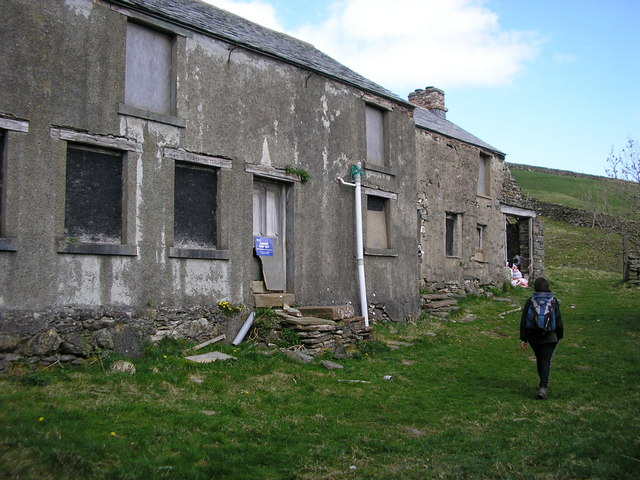
Sleddale Hall, filming site of Monty's cottage, is still a common place of pilgrimage for Withnail and I aficionados.

In 2016, Games Radar voted Withnail and I the 16th greatest comedy film of all time. In a 2017 poll of 150 actors, directors, writers, producers and critics for Time Out magazine, the film was ranked the 15th best British film ever. The line "We want the finest wines available to humanity, we want them here and we want them now", delivered by Richard E. Grant as Withnail, was voted the third favourite film one-liner in a 2003 poll of 1,000 film fans.

There is a drinking game associated with the film. The game consists of keeping up, drink for drink, with each alcoholic substance consumed by Withnail over the course of the film. All told, Withnail is shown drinking roughly 9 1/2 glasses of red wine, one-half imperial pint (280 ml) of cider, one shot of lighter fluid (vinegar or overproof rum are common substitutes), 2 1/2 measures of gin, six glasses of sherry, thirteen drams of Scotch whisky and 1/2 pint of ale.

In 1992, filmmaker David Fincher attempted to create an unofficial reunion of sorts, when he attempted casting all three of the film's main characters in Alien 3. McGann and Brown appeared; however, Grant turned down his role, which eventually went to Charles Dance, who played the character of Clemens in the "spirit of Withnail".

In 1996, the Los Angeles Times reported the film (and the associated drinking game) had achieved cult status prior to its home video re-release in the United States.

In 2007, a digitally remastered version of the film was released by the UK Film Council. It was shown at over 50 cinemas around the UK on 11 September, as part of the final week of the BBC's Summer of British Film season.

In 2010, McGann said that he sometimes meets viewers who believe the film was actually shot in the 1960s, saying "It comes from the mid-1980s, but it sticks out like a Smiths record. Its provenance is from a different era. None of the production values, none of the iconography, none of the style remotely has it down as an 80s picture."

In 2025, British actor and comedian Reece Shearsmith dressed in Withnail’s costume throughout the 20th series of the UK TV show Taskmaster, including contacting original costume designer Andrea Galer to have a replica coat custom made.

== Stage adaptation ==
On 12 October 2023, it was announced that a stage adaptation would premiere at the Birmingham Repertory Theatre from 3 to 25 May 2024, adapted by Robinson and directed by Sean Foley.

== See also ==
- BFI Top 100 British films
- London in film
- List of cult films
- Independent cinema in the United Kingdom
