= Red Brick Road =

British advertising agency

The Red Brick Road Company
- Company type: Private
- Industry: Business Services
- Founded: 2006; 20 years ago
- Headquarters: London, United Kingdom
- Products: Advertising & Marketing
- Website: www.redbrickroad.com

Red Brick Road is a Clerkenwell, London based advertising agency. It is best known for producing advertisements for Tesco during the late 2000s, including the well known slogan "Every little helps".

== History ==
The company was created in 2006 by retired Lowe Worldwide executive Sir Frank Lowe and Paul Weinberger. It was named after the route that Dorothy refused to follow in The Wizard of Oz. Lowe retired in 2009, while remaining a shareholder in the company, which continued to be managed by former colleagues.

In 2011, Red Brick Road merged with its sister company Ruby, whose founders replaced the core team. The company suffered a financial setback in 2012, when they lost the Tesco advertising contract, which resulted in Weinberger's departure from the company. The agency's new management team claims to have a positive outlook about its future.

In 2018, Red Brick Road launched a standalone sister data agency called Emerald.

== Notable campaigns ==
The agency's best known client was the supermarket chain Tesco, and Weinberger created their slogan "Every little helps". Red Brick Road designed the Christmas 2011 campaign, which featured shots of various people preparing for Christmas in 12 different towns.

Red Brick Road has managed several other campaigns, including multinational conglomerate Suzuki and drinks manufacturers Jägermeister, Rémy Martin, Magners, Bulmers and Heineken.

In 2018, one of the UK's leading fruit drink brands, Rubicon, appointed Red Brick Road as strategic, creative and social media agency. Red Brick Road has been involved in the creation of a new brand strategy, in addition to managing Rubicon's social media profiles.

== Awards ==
The company won the 2011 Creative Circle award for "Best TV Commercial (Double Gold)" for their Magners promotion.

== See also ==
- List of advertising agencies
