= Sleddale Hall =

Farmhouse in England

Coordinates: 54°29′43.95″N 2°42′41.88″W

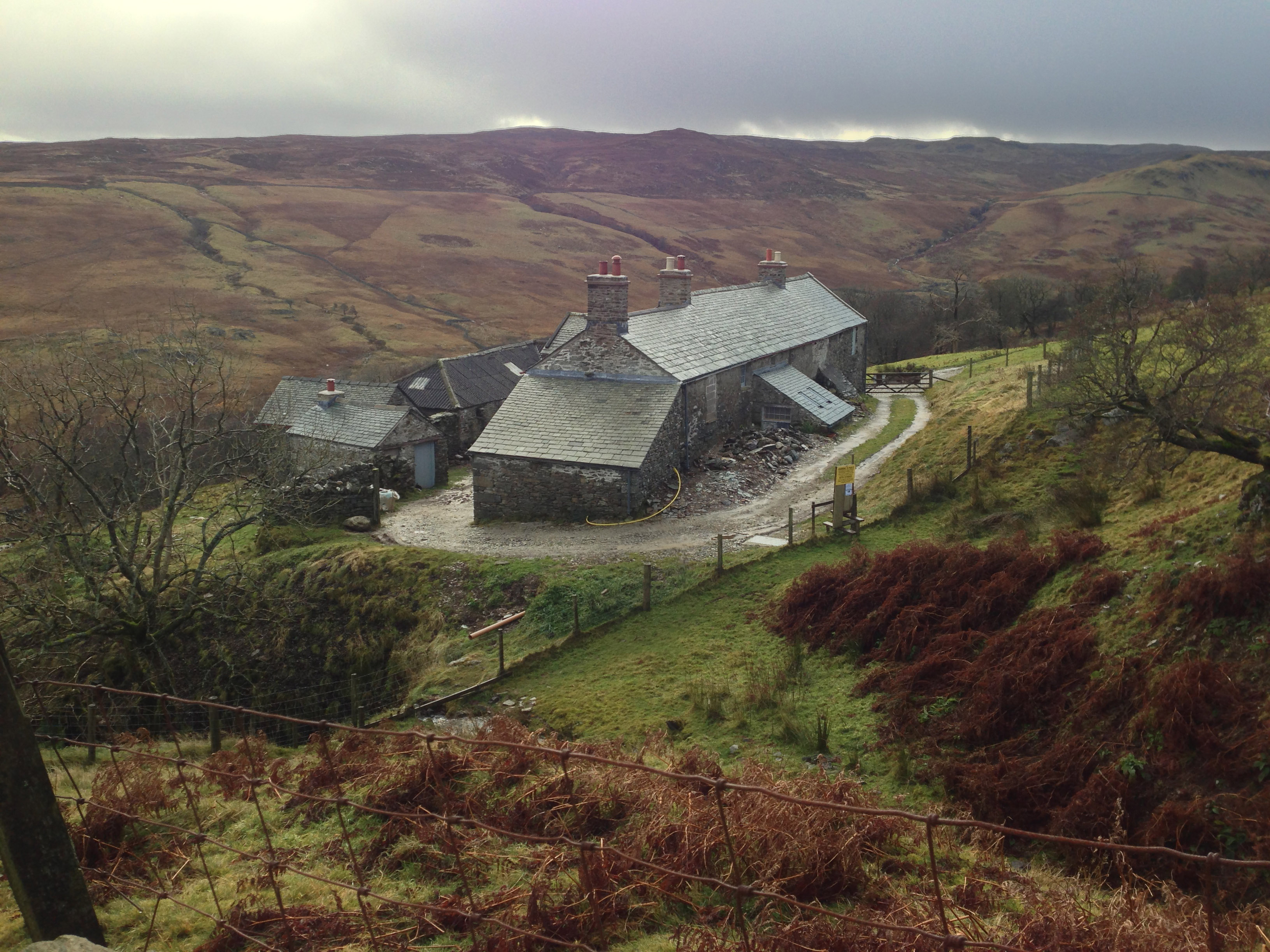
- Sleddale Hall in 2012
- Interactive map of the Sleddale Hall area

General information
- Type: Farmhouse
- Current tenants: Mike Harrison (farmer)
- Landlord: Tim Ellis

Sleddale Hall is a farmhouse on the north side of the Wet Sleddale valley near Shap in Cumbria, England. It featured as "Crow Crag", Uncle Monty's Lake District country cottage in the cult film Withnail and I.

== House and farm ==
Not much is known of the early history of Sleddale Hall. In the medieval period large parts of Wet Sleddale were owned by Shap Abbey, and cultivation terraces belonging to the Abbey's grange in the valley lie immediately to the north-east of Sleddale Hall. It is believed that Sleddale Hall was the home of William Rawes, Yeoman of Sleddale sometime between 1740 and 1758.

An 1802 description of Sleddale Hall and its surrounding farmland reads

"Sleddale Hall is situated a few miles south westwards from Shap in a narrow valley among the mountains. We could find nothing to give us any information as to the quality of land in this farm. There is a considerable extent enclosed on each side of the vale which is at present singularly divided into different fields. This we calculated to be about 250 acres [1.0 km^{2}], consisting partly of woodland, partly of poorish meadow ground, and partly of pasture, all of which, or nearly all, lies in rapid declivities. Besides the above inclosed ground, there may be about 2,300 acres [9.3 km^{2}] of barren mountains, forming altogether a tolerably good sheep farm. The meadow ground is mostly capable of improvement by draining, & that at a reasonable expense. This farm, every thing considered we suppose may be worth a rent of £150. But as observed before, our means of calculating the value were very defective."

Thomas Graham (c.1705–1787), also of Stonehouse, Hayton, lived at Sleddale Hall in the mid-18th century.

In 1829 Sleddale Hall was recorded as: "Sleddale Hall, now a farm-house belonging to C. Wilson, Esq., was long the seat of the ancient family of Sleddale, one of whom was the first Mayor of Kendal, and possessed Gillthwaite-Rigg, and some other estates." The Wet Sleddale Reservoir was built below the Hall some time in the 1960s to provide water for Manchester, flooding a small part of the dale. By the time of the filming of Withnail and I in 1986, Sleddale Hall was derelict.

== Filming of Withnail and I ==
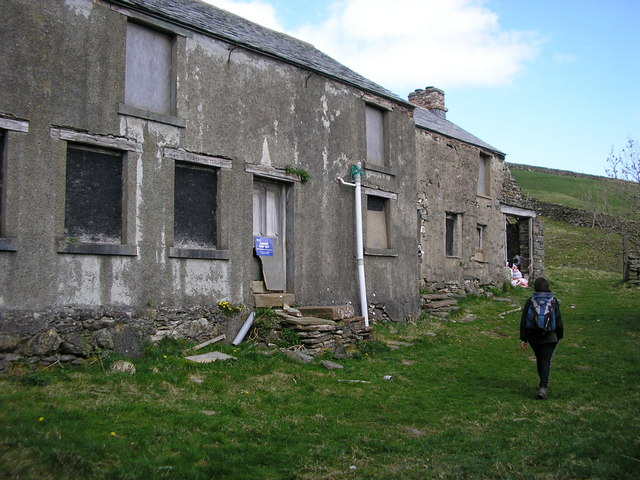
Sleddale Hall place of pilgrimage for Withnail and I fans

Sleddale Hall stood in as "Crow Crag", the Lake District cottage owned by Uncle Monty in the film Withnail and I. The scenes at Sleddale Hall were filmed in August 1986. Actor Richard E. Grant, who played Withnail, recorded his first impressions of the farmhouse in his published diary:

2nd August. Mini-bus together out to the location in Wet Sleddale, supposedly the wettest corner of the United Kingdom, through numerous gates, up a mountainside to an abandoned cottage on the water board estate. Perfect. Looks exactly like the script suggests.

Filming took place both in the downstairs rooms of the house and in the exterior areas, including the small courtyard. The interior shots of the bedrooms and staircase were not filmed at Sleddale Hall, but at Stockers Farm, Rickmansworth, Hertfordshire.

== In recent years ==
Sleddale Hall was owned by United Utilities, formerly North West Water. Following its appearance in Withnail and I, North West Water had planned to renovate the Hall and convert it into a holiday cottage and workshop. However, planning permission was refused on the grounds that it would alter the character of the valley. In 1998 the Hall was placed on the market, but did not sell.

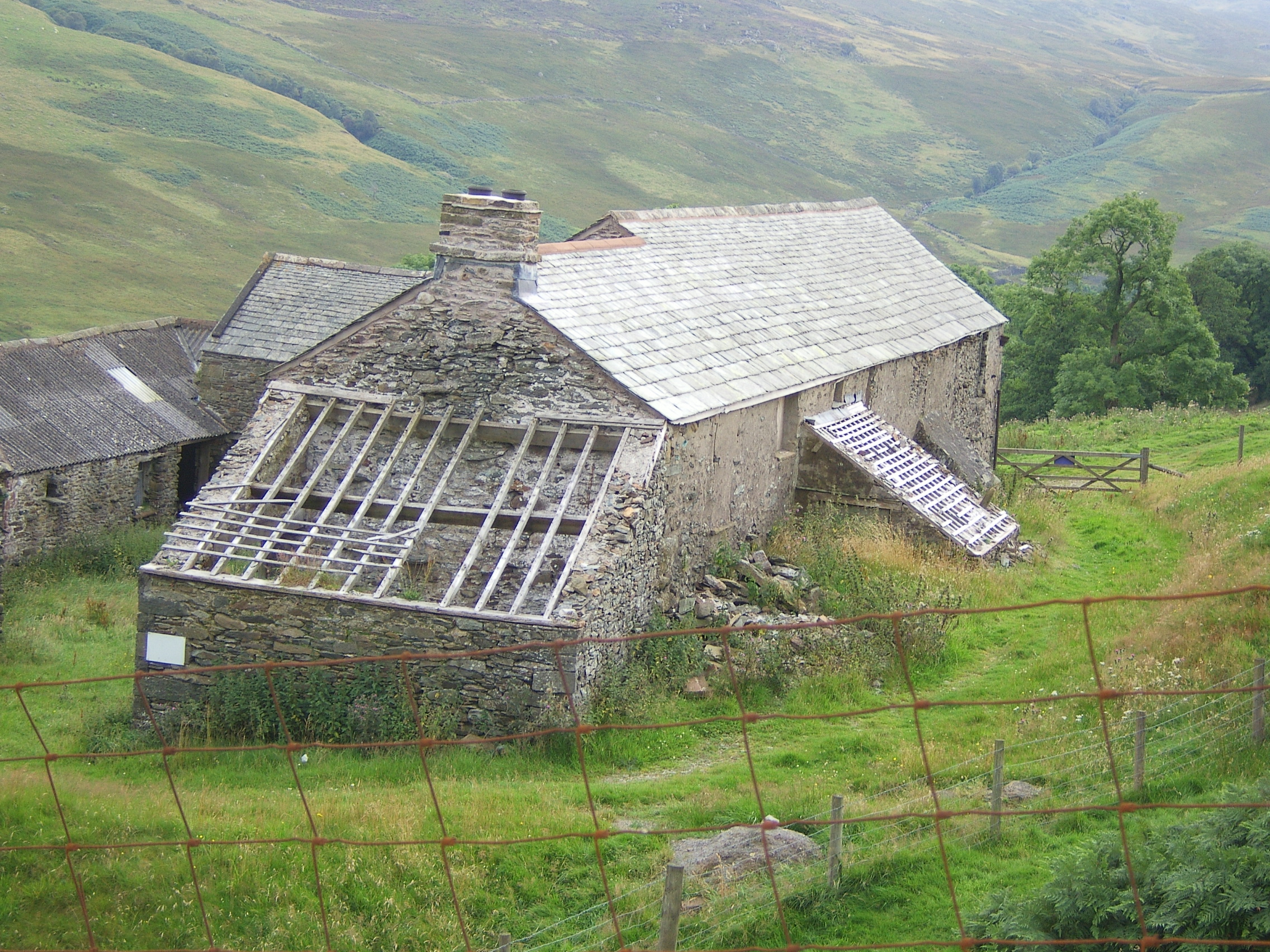
In 2007, before renovation

Sleddale Hall is tenanted by a farmer, Mike Harrison, whose suckler herd which produces Blonde d'Aquitaine crossbred calves won the 2008 British Blonde Society's biannual UK Commercial Herd of the Year Award. A judge said that the award was notable "considering the type of hard farm he is rearing them on": at Sleddale Hall the cows graze 980 to 1,450 ft (300 to 440 m) above sea level, on rough grazing. The house itself was still dilapidated and uninhabited as of September 2008.

In January 2009 it was announced that Sleddale Hall had been put up for auction by United Utilities. The auction took place on 16 February 2009, with a guide price of over £145,000. A trust named 'The Crow Crag Collective' was set up on 22 January to try to buy the house at auction and preserve it for the fans of Withnail and I. The house originally sold at auction on 16 February 2009 for £265,000. The prospective purchaser was Sebastian Hindley, owner of the Mardale Inn in Bampton, a nearby village which also featured in the film. Hindley spoke of his purchase: "It's part of our heritage ... I'm very passionate about this area. I would like to transform it back to how it was in the film. It could be a working museum, with self-catering accommodation and maybe a tea room." The house does not currently have planning permission.

However, in May 2009 the sale of Sleddale Hall fell through and Sebastian Hindley is reported to have said that funding problems meant he had missed his deadline. United Utilities "considered its options", and when finances from the original buyer Hindley did not materialise, he was given more time by United Utilities but could not raise the cash.

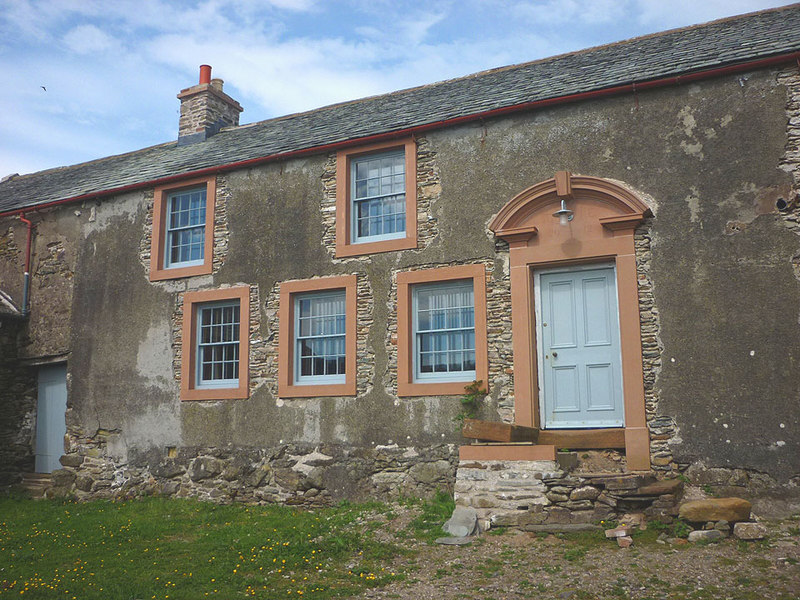
Refurbished windows and door in 2014

United Utilities then sold Sleddale Hall to Tim Ellis, an architect from Canterbury in Kent, whose bid at the auction had originally failed. He plans to convert Sleddale Hall into a private home, retaining a "Withnail atmosphere". Ellis specialises in the restoration of historic buildings and said "I am delighted to have had a second chance to buy this beautiful building. I first saw the film about seven years ago and have been a fan ever since. I would like to restore the building in a way that other fans of the film could approve of."

A Certificate of Lawful Use was granted by the Lake District National Park Authority in March 2011. The Certificate confirms the residential status of Sleddale Hall in Planning Law. Building works to restore Sleddale Hall commenced in August 2011 and were completed in August 2012 The works included a partial reconstruction of the courtyard elevation to include features which were added to the house for the film including a doorcase and window surrounds. For the film, these features were copied from a house in Mosedale and created using plaster of Paris. For the reconstruction, red Lazonby sandstone, from Stoneraise quarry North of Penrith, was used; it being a very close match to the sandstone used in the house.

Sleddale Hall is private property with no public access, but since the film came out has frequently been visited by fans of the film.

== Bibliography ==
- Richard E. Grant, 1996, With Nails: The Film Diaries of Richard E. Grant Picador
