= George Price Boyce =

English painter (1826–1897)

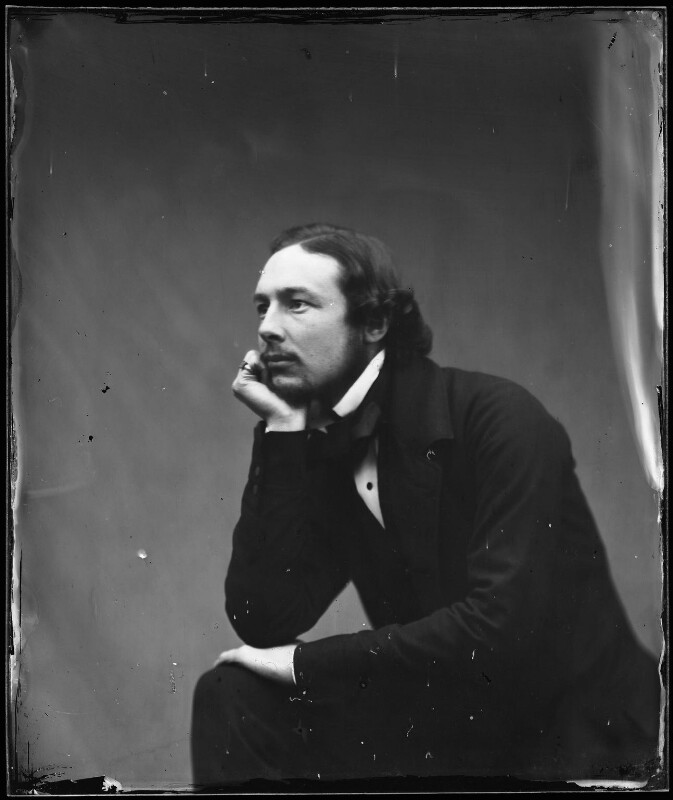
Boyce c. 1850

George Price Boyce RWS (24 September 1826 – 9 February 1897) was a British watercolour painter of landscapes and vernacular architecture in the Pre-Raphaelite style. He was a patron and friend of Dante Gabriel Rossetti.

== Life ==
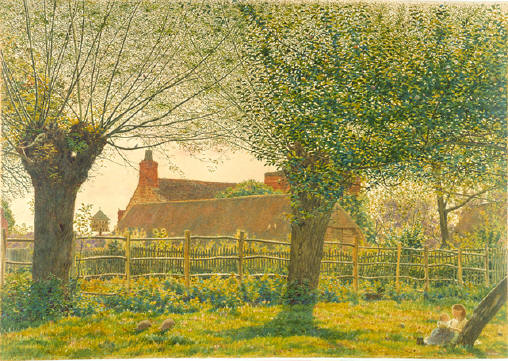
At Binsey, near Oxford (1862)

Boyce was born in Gray's Inn Terrace in London, and was the son of George Boyce, a wine merchant turned pawnbroker. His sister was the painter Joanna Mary Boyce. He went to school in Chipping Ongar in Essex, and then studied in Paris. In October 1843 he was articled to an architect named Little, with whom he remained for four years, until joining the architectural firm of Wyatt and Brandon. Already disillusioned with architecture a meeting with the artist David Cox in August 1849 persuaded him to give up the profession and take up watercolour painting instead.

His early work shows the influence of Cox whom he met again in Bettws-y-Coed in 1851, but he went on to develop his own detailed style under the influence of the Pre-Raphaelite painters, having met Thomas Seddon and Rossetti in about 1849 and William Holman Hunt and John Everett Millais in 1853, in which year he painted in Dinan, Brittany, with Seddon. In 1854 he went to Venice, where he sketched subjects recommended to him by the critic John Ruskin. who corresponded with him during his four months in the city.

Much of his work from the late 1850s concentrated on English landscapes, often incorporating views of vernacular architecture, especially around the Thames Valley villages of Pangbourne, Mapledurham, Whitchurch and Streatley, as well as in Sussex and Surrey. In the 1870s he painted many views of Ludlow, and was increasingly drawn to more remote landscapes in Britain.

In 1861, following the death of his sister, he went to Egypt, where he shared a house in Giza with Frank Dillon and Egron Lundgren until the February of the following year.

Rossetti, who disliked working out of doors borrowed Boyce's sketches to provide the background for his watercolour Writing on the Sand (1858; British Museum, London). Although on a retainer with Rossetti, Alexa Wilding informally modelled for Boyce in the 1860s.

Boyce exhibited both oils and watercolours at the Royal Academy between 1853 and 1861. He was a founding member of the Hogarth Club. and of the Medieval Society, an organisation, formed mostly of architects, dedicated to promoting interest in the art and architecture of the Middle Ages. He was also a leading member of the Society for the Protection of Ancient Buildings. He exhibited frequently at the Royal Watercolour Society and was elected Associate in 1864 and Member in 1878.

From 1871 he lived at West House, Chelsea, designed for him by his friend Philip Webb. The house (home of Uncle Monty in the film Withnail and I) is described by Historic England as "one of the earliest examples of the Queen Anne Revival style".

He retired from painting in 1893 through ill health. and died at West House on 9 February 1897. Boyce's diary has become a major source of information on Rossetti and the Pre-Raphaelite Brotherhood.

Several British museums have examples of his paintings, especially the Victoria & Albert Museum and Ashmolean Museum in Oxford. In America the Yale Center for British Art has the largest collection.

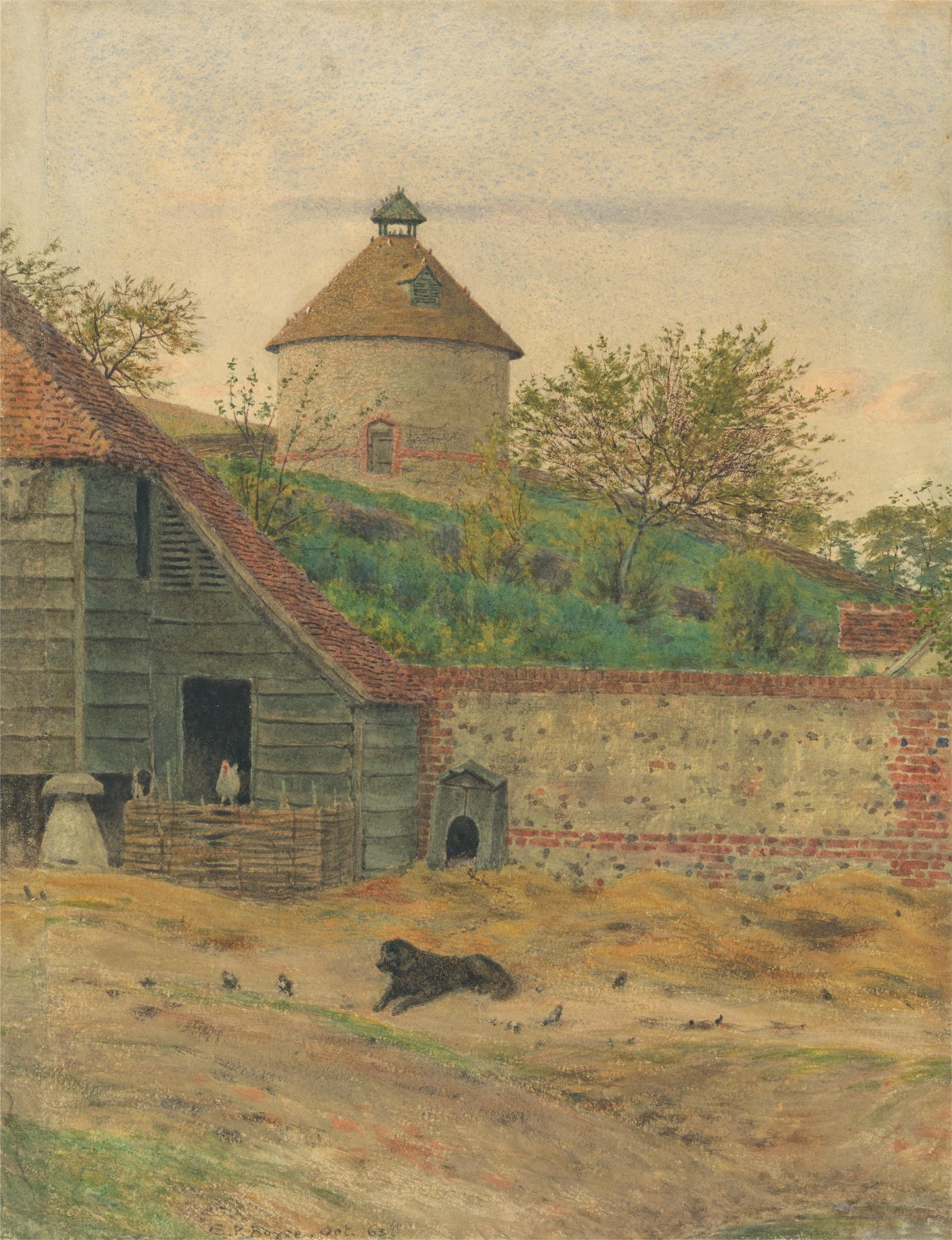
Dovecote at Streatley, 1863, watercolour, 30x22 cm, Yale Center for British Art

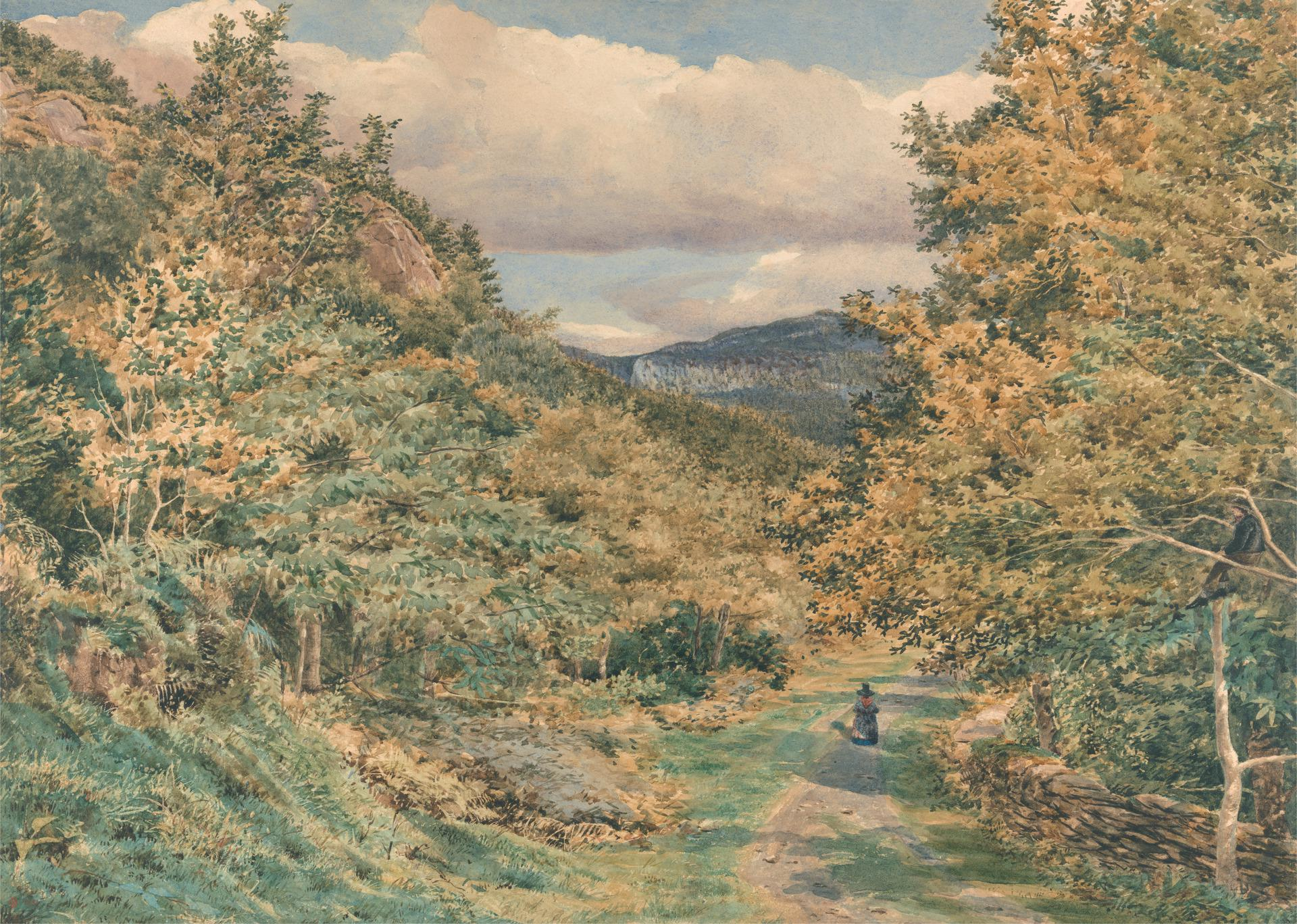
A Road Near Bettws-y-Coed, 1853, 38x53, Yale

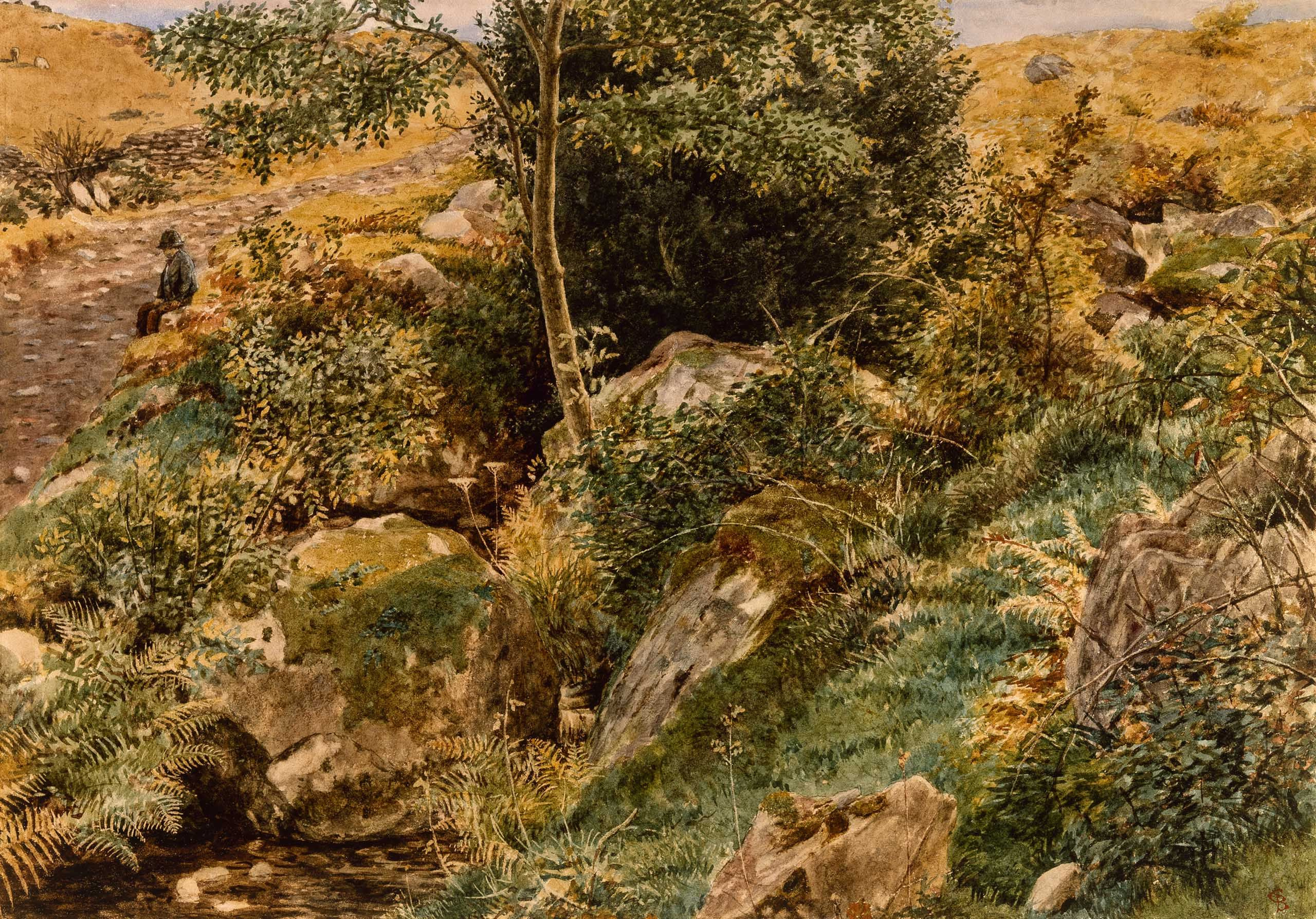
Autumn in the Welsh Hills, c. 1860, 27x39 cm, Denver Art Museum

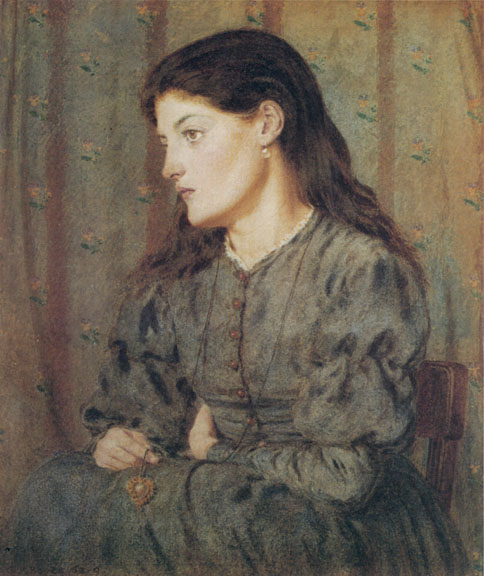
Portrait of Mary Leslie, 1869, watercolour

== Sources ==
- Newall, Christopher; Egerton, Judy (1987). George Price Boyce. Exhibition Catalogue. London: The Tate Gallery. ISBN 978-0-946590-77-3.
- Staley, Alison; Newall, Christopher (2004). Pre-Raphaelite Vision: Truth to Nature. London: Tate Publishing. ISBN 978-1-85437-499-8.
