= Frank Lowe (advertiser) =

British advertising agent (born 1941)

Sir Frank Lowe
- Born: Frank Budge Lowe; 23 August 1941 (age 84); Manchester, England
- Known for: advertising pioneer
- Spouse(s): 4th wife: Dawn Dunlap (Lady Dawn Lowe); 5th wife: Pat Booth, Lady Lowe (2008-09, her death); 6th wife: Martina Lewis, Lady Lowe

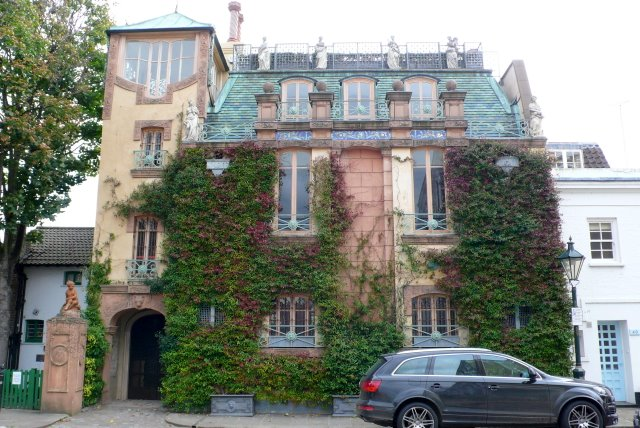
50 Glebe Place, 2008

Sir Frank Budge Lowe (born 12 August 1941) is a British advertising agent who worked for Collett Dickenson Pearce, Lowe & Partners Worldwide, and Red Brick Road. He was knighted for services to charity and advertising.

== Career ==
He first rose to fame running Collett Dickenson Pearce, which he built into one of the best known agencies in the United Kingdom. In 1981, with Geoff Howard-Spink he started Lowe Howard-Spink, which eventually became Lowe & Partners Worldwide. In 1979, Lowe arranged sponsorship of the Queen's Club Championships, which became known as the Stella Artois tournament, an arrangement that lasted almost 30 years. He became founder and president.

Lowe built 50 Glebe Place in Chelsea, between 1985 and 1987, to be his home.

In the 2001 Birthday Honours, Lowe was knighted for services to charity and advertising, allegedly less than a year after donating £2m to the country's first City Academy, Capital City Academy, in North West London.

He quit his eponymous agency in 2003, becoming its chairman emeritus, after falling out with parent Interpublic, which had acquired Lowe Worldwide in 1990.

After fulfilling a two-year non-compete clause, Lowe founded the Red Brick Road integrated agency, taking its name from the route that Dorothy didn't follow in the Wizard of Oz.

He launched by poaching Tesco's £50m advertising account from Lowe Worldwide. Other clients include Gala Coral, Sky One, Heineken and Olympus. In 2010 Lowe announced that he was "stepping back from day-to-day involvement".

== Personal life ==
Lowe was married six times. From one of his first two marriages, his daughter Emma was born. His third wife, Michelle, gave birth to a son, Hamilton. His fourth wife was a US citizen, former actress Dawn Dunlap. They had a son, Sebastian. In 2008, Lowe married for the fifth time to 1960s model Pat Booth. She died of cancer in 2009, aged 66. Lowe's sixth wife was Czech-born PR Martina Lewis.

== Legacy ==
Lowe is the only account manager to have won The President's Award from the Design and Art Direction Association of London.
