= Lev Nussimbaum =

Jewish writer

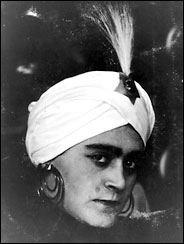
- Born: October 17, 1905; Kiev, Russian Empire
- Died: August 27, 1942 (aged 36); Positano, near Naples, Kingdom of Italy
- Occupations: Writer, journalist
- Writing career
- Pen name: Mohammad Essad Bey, Kurban Said
- Website: essadbey.de

Lev Nussimbaum (October 17, 1905 – August 27, 1942), who wrote under the pen names Essad Bey and Kurban Said, was a writer and journalist, born in Kiev to a Jewish family. He lived there and in Baku during his childhood before fleeing the Bolsheviks in 1920 at the age of 14. In 1922, while living in Germany, he obtained a certificate claiming that he had converted to Islam in the presence of the imam of the Turkish embassy in Berlin. He created a niche for himself in the competitive European literary world by writing about topics that Westerners, in general, knew little about - the Caucasus, the Russian Empire, the Bolshevik Revolution, newly discovered oil, and Islam. He wrote under the name of Essad Bey in German.

Historians and literary critics who knew these subjects well discredited Essad Bey as a reliable source. Today, historians disregard books published under this name and rarely quote him, though the topics Essad Bey chose to write about are still critically relevant. The fact that Essad Bey was so prolific calls into question the authorship of these books and whether Essad Bey was primarily operating as a broker and doctoring manuscripts and marketing them under his pseudonym, which had become famous. In 1934, his agent Werner Schendell warned him to slow down and take a year off between books so that he would not appear to be so prolific. That year no books were published in German – only two novellas in Polish.

== Life ==
Lev Nussimbaum was born in October 1905. He claimed that he was born in a train. Documents in the Kyiv State Archives and the Kyiv Synagogue state that Lev Nussimbaum was born in Kiev. Nussimbaum's birth was originally registered in the Kyiv Synagogue.

His father, Abraam Leybusovich Nussimbaum, was a Jew from Tiflis, in present-day Georgia, born in 1875. He later migrated to Baku and invested in oil. His mother, Berta Basya Davidovna Slutzkin Nussimbaum according to her marriage certificate, was a Jew from Belarus. She committed suicide on February 16, 1911 in Baku when Nussimbaum was five years old. Apparently, she had embraced left-wing politics and was possibly involved in the underground Communist movement. Nussimbaum's father hired Alice Schulte, a woman of German ethnicity, to be his son's governess.

Memorial plaque on the house in Berlin (Fasanenstraße 72) where Lev Nussimbaum lived for two years

In 1918, Lev and his father temporarily fled Baku because of the massacres that were taking place in the streets between different political forces. According to Essad Bey's first book, Blood and Oil in the Orient, which historians do not consider to be very reliable, the two travelled through Turkestan and Persia. Researchers have found no record of this adventurous journey except in Nussimbaum's own writings. Nussimbaum and his father returned to Baku, but when the Bolsheviks took Baku in the spring of 1920, they fled to Georgia. They stayed there until the Bolsheviks took Tiflis and Batumi.

Lev Nussimbaum, as Essad Bey, wrote his first book Oel und Blut im Orient (Blood and Oil in the Orient) in German in 1929. Although he claims that his account was autobiographical, historians in Azerbaijan and Georgia discount this claim, as there are many major factual errors in the historical description. Essad Bey describes his delight when, at the age of 14, he and his father left Azerbaijan. In the final passage of the book, he writes: "At that moment, Europe began for me. The Old East was dead."

They purportedly boarded a ship bound for Istanbul, where thousands of refugees had fled. Nussimbaum eventually settled in Berlin (1921–1933), where he enrolled simultaneously in high school and in Friedrich-Wilhelms-Universität. He did not graduate from either school, but told people that he had received a Cand. Phil. degree.

In 1926, he began writing under the pen name of Essad Bey for the literary journal Die literarische Welt (The Literary World). At least 120 articles were published under this name. By the early 1930s, Essad Bey had become a popular author throughout Western Europe, writing mainly about contemporary historical and political issues.

Politically, Essad Bey was a monarchist. In 1931, he joined the German-Russian League Against Bolshevism, the members of which, Daniel Lazare remarks, "for the most part either were Nazis or soon would be". He joined the Social Monarchist Party, which advocated restoration of Germany's Hohenzollern dynasty. He also had connections to the pre-fascistic Young Russian movement, headed by Alexander Kazembek.

In 1932, Essad Bey married Erika Loewendahl, daughter of shoe magnate Walter Loewendahl. The marriage failed, ending in scandal. Erika ran off in 1935 with Nussimbaum's colleague René Fülöp-Miller. Erika's parents, who were wealthy, succeeded in getting the marriage to Nussimbaum annulled in 1937.

In 1938, when Nazi Germany annexed Austria, Nussimbaum fled to Italy and settled in the seacoast town of Positano. He died there of a rare blood disorder which causes gangrene of the extremities. This was most likely Buerger's disease, which is known to afflict Ashkenazi male Jews, rather than Raynaud's Disease, which is more prevalent in women. It is possible that Essad Bey denied his Jewish ancestry to doctors who were treating him, which led to the misdiagnosis of Raynaud's instead of Buerger's. Little was known in the early 1940s about Buerger's disease, especially that the disease could be reversed if the patient stopped smoking. Essad Bey, who was known to be a heavy smoker, died a painful death at the age of 36.

== Islam ==
Nussimbaum had a romantic view of Islam, seeing it as part of the grand cultural heritage of "the East", to which he felt connected through his Jewish heritage, and a bulwark against the evils of Western modernity and Bolshevism. Writing about his childhood in Azerbaijan, he notes the emotional response he had in looking at the old palaces in Baku:

I saw the broad expanse of the sandy Arabian desert, I saw the horsemen, their snow-white burnooses billowing in the wind, I saw the flocks of prophets praying towards Mecca and I wanted to be one with this wall, one with this desert, one with this incomprehensible, intricate script, one with the entire Islamic Orient, which in our Baku had been so ceremoniously carried to the grave, to the victorious drumbeats of European culture.... Throughout my entire childhood, I dreamed of the Arabic edifices every night... I do know that it was the most powerful, most formative feeling of my life.

Confusion surrounds the details of Essad Bey's conversion to Islam. There are at least three accounts that attempt to explain his alleged conversion:

(1) When Essad Bey was 17 years old, he officially obtained a certificate of conversion as "document of proof" in a declaration to Imam Hafiz Shuku (1871-1924) of the former Ottoman Embassy in Berlin on August 13, 1922.

(2) However, later accounts circulated that Essad Bey did not convert to Islam but simply reclaimed his religious identity since he had been born a Muslim.

(3) Essad Bey converted to Islam along with his family when he was eight years old.

In 1924 in Berlin, Nussimbaum helped found an Islamic student group Islamia, where he met other Muslims: Arabs, Turks, Iranians, Afghans and Indians, as well as converts like himself. They "spoke out about the wretched situation of Muslims in the colonial world." However, some Muslims objected to the way Nussimbaum depicted Islam in his writings, accusing him of Orientalism and of not being a "real" Muslim. In 1930, Mohammed Hoffman, a member of Islamia and himself a convert to Islam, accused Nussimbaum of trying "to pass for a born Muslim" and suggesting that his conversion was merely a ploy. As a result of this and similar accusations, Nussimbaum stopped attending Islamia meetings; however, he never renounced Islam or distanced himself from it. In 1934 the New York Herald Tribune ran a profile of Essad Bey which described him as an irreverent Muslim who "carries no prayer rug; he fails to salute Mecca when he prays... eats pigs and drinks wine; yet when he came to be married in Berlin he refused to abjure his creed."

Armin Wegner, a contemporary of Essad Bey who knew him in his last years in Positano, Italy, observed that Bey "kept up the comedy of being Muslim to the end."

A scathing review of Essad Bey's biography Mohammed expressed doubt that the author "had ever read the Quran, either in the original or in translation." It claimed: "Essad Bey's Mohammed is a potpourri of bad history, distorted facts and naive interpretations. It should never have been written... In fact, I am impelled to go still further and state that there is hardly a page in this 'biography' which is free from error."

== Works ==
Despite Nussimbaum's being an ethnic Jew, his monarchist and anti-Bolshevik politics were such that, before his origins were discovered, the Nazi propaganda ministry included his works on their list of "excellent books for German minds". Among the works credited to him are early biographies of Lenin, Stalin and Czar Nicholas II, Mohammed, the Prophet; and Reza Shah of Iran. All of these biographies were allegedly written between 1932 and 1936. At one point, Nussimbaum was requested to write an official biography of Benito Mussolini. Essad Bey's works, many of which he claimed were biographies, are discredited by historians and literary critics and rarely referenced today except to note how unreliable they are.

=== Ali and Nino ===
Tom Reiss attributes the 1937 novel Ali and Nino: A Love Story, published under the pseudonym Kurban Said, to Lev Nussimbaum. In his biography of Nussimbaum, The Orientalist, Reiss argues that Said was another pseudonym of Nussimbaum's, and that Ali and Nino was written by Nussimbaum.

Reiss also debunks claims made by the heirs of Austrian baroness Elfriede Ehrenfels, who claimed co-authorship. Reiss acknowledges that she registered the book with German authorities in Austria after 1938, but suggests that this was because Nussimbaum could not have received money for publishing the book in Germany due to his Jewish ethnicity.

Other critics, however, maintain that the book is partially plagiarized. They suggest that it was adapted by Nussimbaum from an earlier manuscript. A 2011 issue of Azerbaijan International re-opened the issue of the authorship of Ali and Nino. The primary author featured in this issue, Betty Blair, states that "we are convinced" that the book was written mostly by Azerbaijani author Yusif Vazir Chamanzaminli, though they also offer evidence that Nussimbaum wrote at least some portions of the book.

They argue that the folkloric and legendary passages include exact "cut and paste" passages that Nussimbaum had published multiple times in his earlier works. They also note that Nussimbaum left the Caucasus when he was only 14 years old and that he boasted that he was a Monarchist, although the novel expresses the views of someone who sought the independence of Azerbaijan. Reiss dismissed the claim that Chamanzaminli was the author behind the Said pseudonym, claiming that he looked at one of Chamanzaminli's novellas and found him to be a Muslim communalist nationalist. Blair argues, in contrast, that Ali and Nino is a "nationalist" book in a broader, non-communalist sense, since the novel is essentially about Azerbaijan's independence.

Tamar Injia published a book entitled Ali and Nino – Literary Robbery!, showing that substantial portions of the book were copied from the book The Snake's Skin by Georgian author Grigol Robakidze. Injia analyzed the two books, and found a number of similar or identical passages, and concluded that "Kurban Said" (whose real life identity she does not attempt to determine) deliberately copied passages from Robakidze's earlier novel.

== Bibliography ==
=== Under pen name of Essad Bey ===
- Blood and Oil in the Orient (1930); reissued by Aran Press in English, 1997 (withdrawn from the market by the publisher because of flagrant absurdities in the book); reissued by Maurer in English, 2008, ISBN 978-3-929345-36-0, in German, 2008, ISBN 978-3-929345-30-8)
- Twelve Secrets of the Caucasus (1930; reissued by Maurer in English, 2008, ISBN 978-3-929345-37-7, in German, 2008, 978-3-929345-33-9)
- Stalin: The Career of a Fanatic (1931)
- The Caucasus (1932), only in German, "Der Kaukasus".
- Mohammed (1932), many editions available worldwide, including English (London: Darf, 1985).
- White Russia: People Without a Homeland (1932) (not translated into English).
- OGPU: The Plot Against the World (1932)
- Liquid Gold (1933), (not translated into English)
- Russia at the Crossroads (1933), (not translated into English).
- Love and Petroleum (1934), novella, only in Polish (not translated into English; published originally in a pulp magazine in Poland. Translated into German and published by Maurer, 2008, 978-3-929345-35-3, together with "Manuela").
- Manuela (1934), novella, only in Polish (not translated into English; published originally in a pulp magazine in Poland. Translated into German and published by Maurer, 2008, 978-3-929345-35-3, together with "Love and Petroleum").
- Nicholas II: The Prisoner in Purple (1935; reissued by Maurer in German, 2011, ISBN 978-3-929345-57-5)
- Lenin (1935), Italian only
- Reza Shah (1936)
- Allah is Great: The Decline and Rise of the Islamic World (1936) (with Wolfgang von Weisl) about the ascendancy of Saudi Arabian king Ibn Saud (1936) (not translated into English).
- End of Bolshevism (1936), which appeared only in Italian as "Giustizia Rossa" (Red Justice).

=== Under pen name of Kurban Said ===
As discussed above, there is a dispute over whether or not Lev Nussimbaum is the core author behind works written under the pseudonym Kurban Said. The works written under this name include the following:

- Ali and Nino (1937, reissued by Anchor, 2000, ISBN 0-385-72040-8, as "Ali and Nino: A Love Story").
- Girl from the Golden Horn (1938, reissued by Overlook Press, 2001, ISBN 1-58567-173-8)
- The Man Who Knew Nothing About Love (Unpublished, but advertised in the back pages of Annemarie Selinko's novel I Was an Ugly Girl, Vienna: Kirschner, 1937, the same year that "Ali and Nino" was published.)
