= Yusif Vazir Chamanzaminli =

Azerbaijani writer and politician (1887–1943)

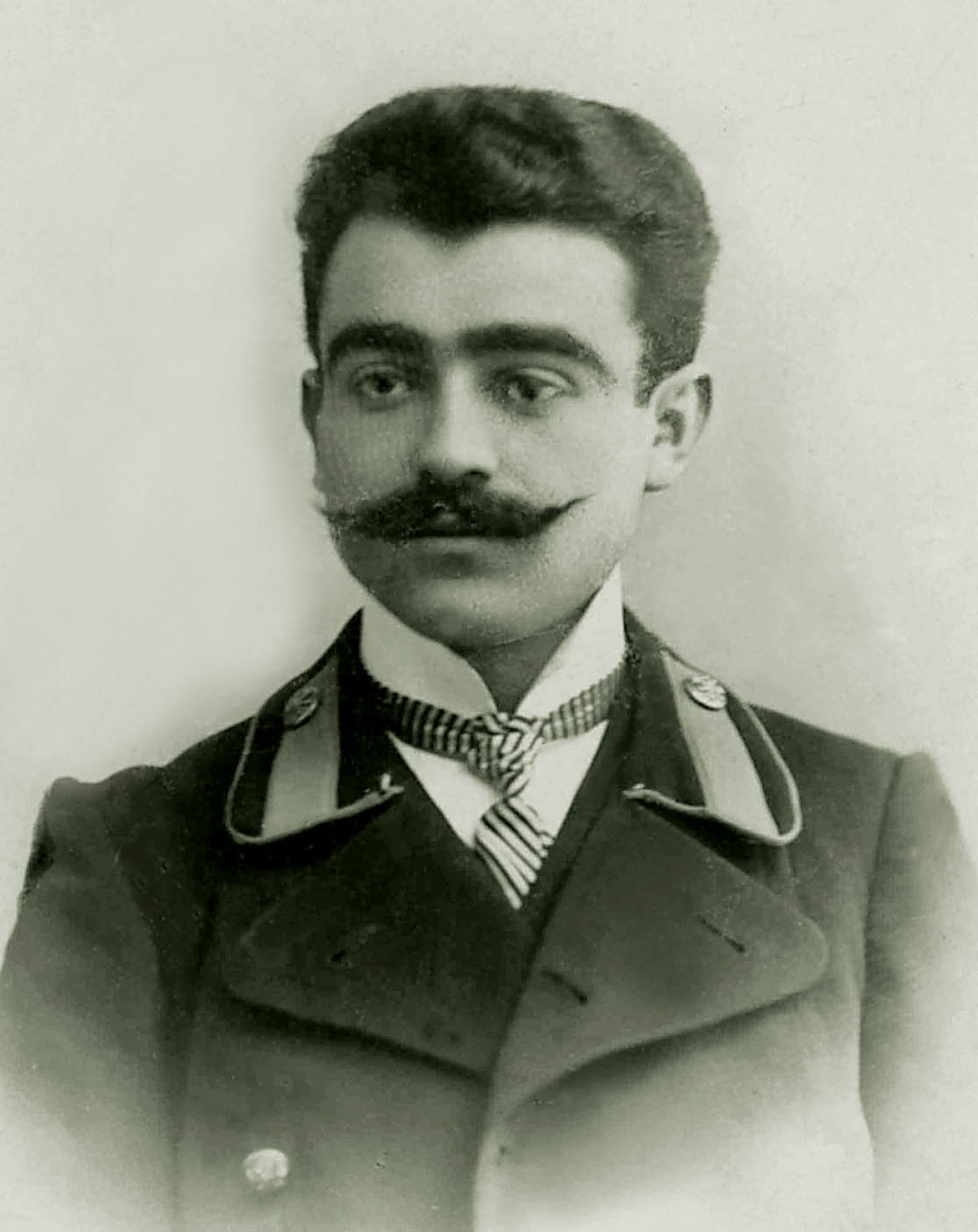
- Yusif Vazir photographed as a law student in 1911
- Born: Yusif Mirbaba oghlu Vazirov; 12 September 1887; Shusha, Russian Empire
- Died: 3 January 1943 (aged 55); Sukhobezvodnoye Gulag camp near Gorky, USSR
- Occupations: Novelist, short story writer, essayist, political activist
- Spouse: Bilgeyis Ajalova
- Children: Orkhan (1928–2010), Fikret (1929–2004),
- Writing career
- Pen name: Chamanzaminli, Kurban Said, Ali Khan Chamanzaminli and about a dozen other minor pen names.
- Language: Azerbaijani, Russian
- Period: Pre-revolutionary and early Soviet
- Genres: novels, short stories, essays, articles
- Notable works: Ali and Nino (1937 as core author to which Essad Bey added some folkloric elements); Maiden Spring (1934); Between Two Fires (published posthumously 1968)

Yusif Vazir Chamanzaminli (Azerbaijani: Yusif Vəzir Çəmənzəminli), also spelled Chemenzeminli, born Yusif Mirbaba oghlu Vazirov (12 September 1887 – 3 January 1943) was an Azerbaijani statesman and writer known for his novels, short stories, essays, and diaries.

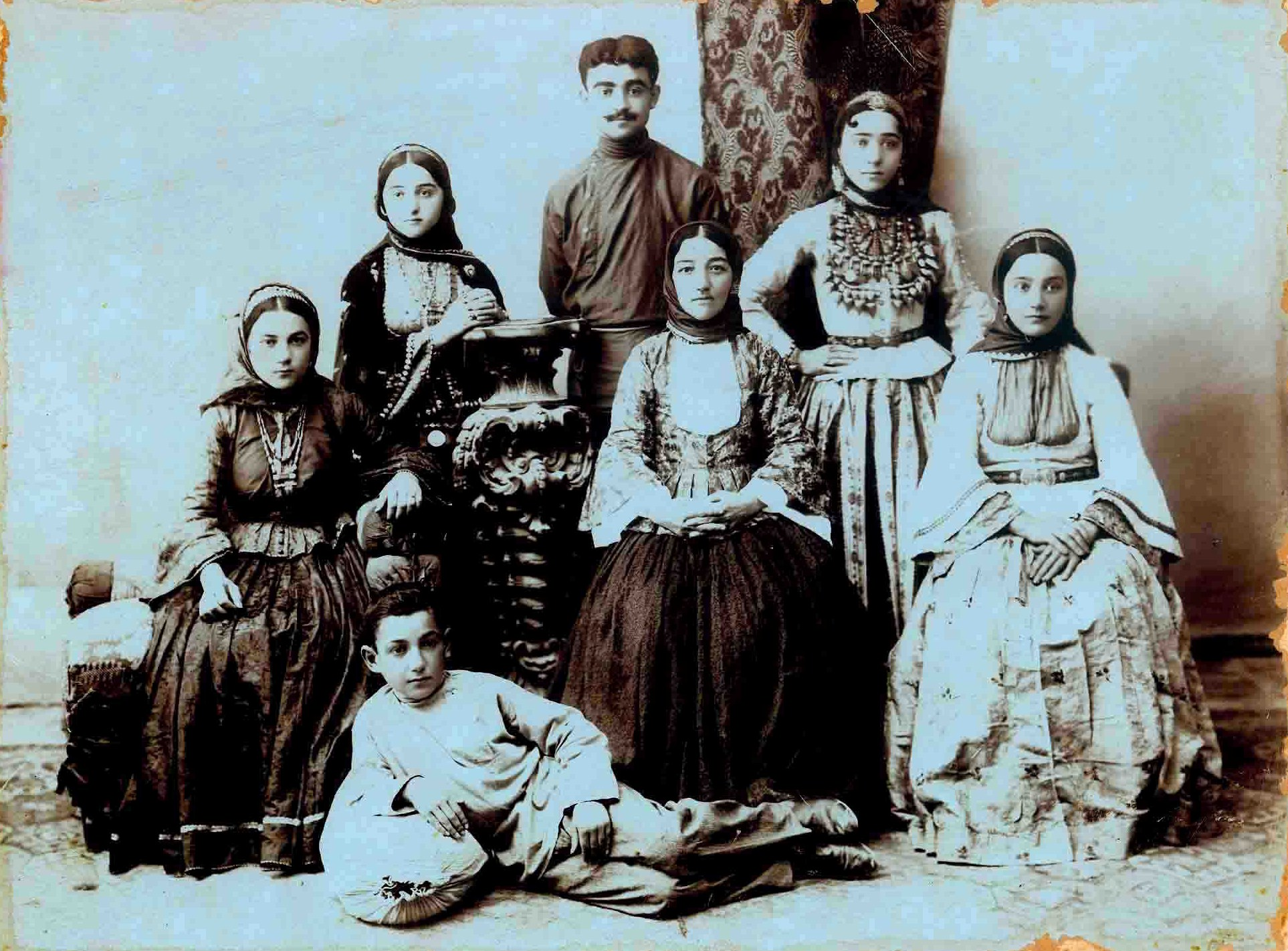
Yusif Vazir Chamanzaminli with his mother, sisters and brother, in his hometown of Shusha, Azerbaijan, around 1905–1906.

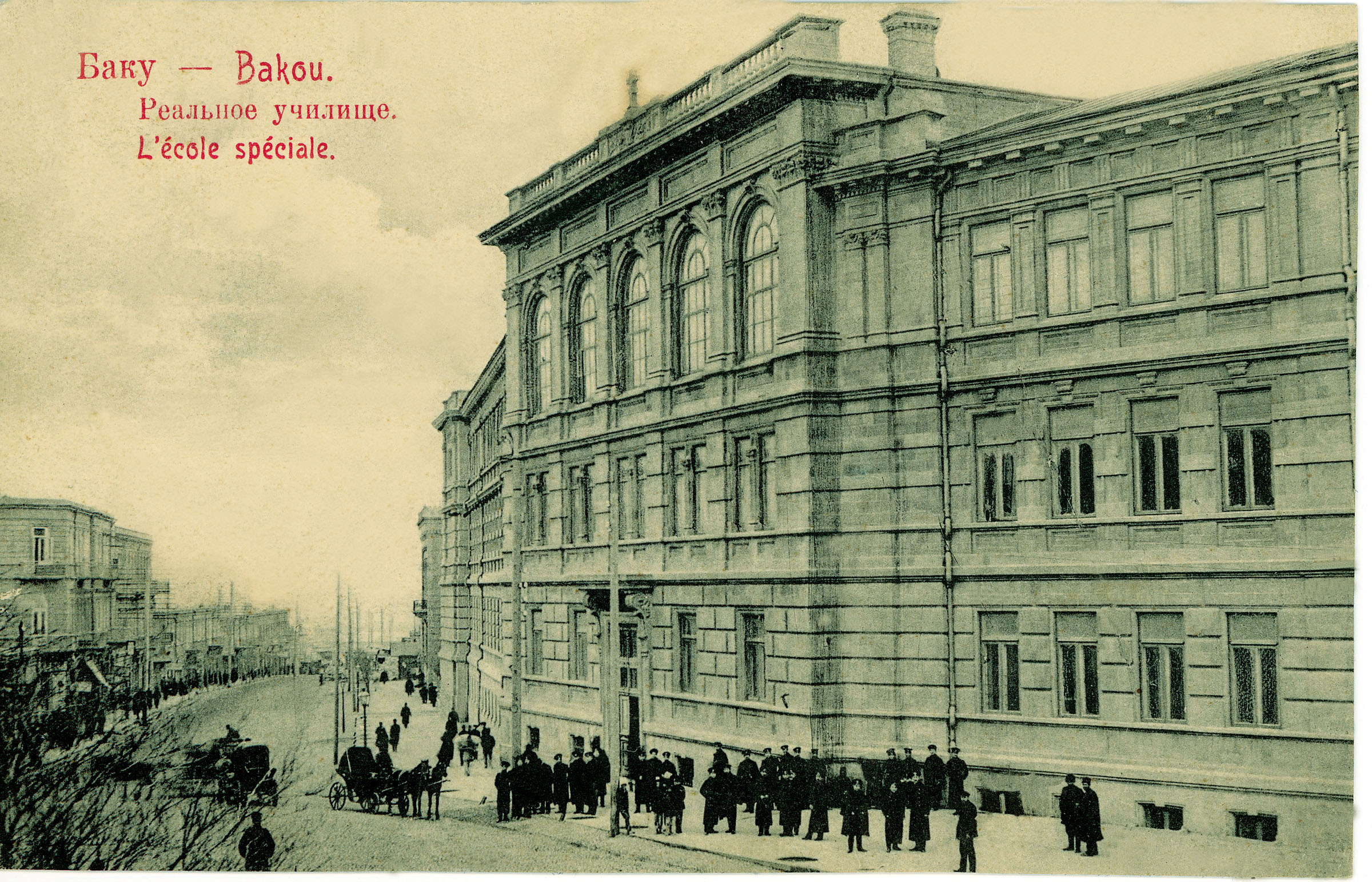
Baku Realni School from which Yusif Vazirov graduated in 1909

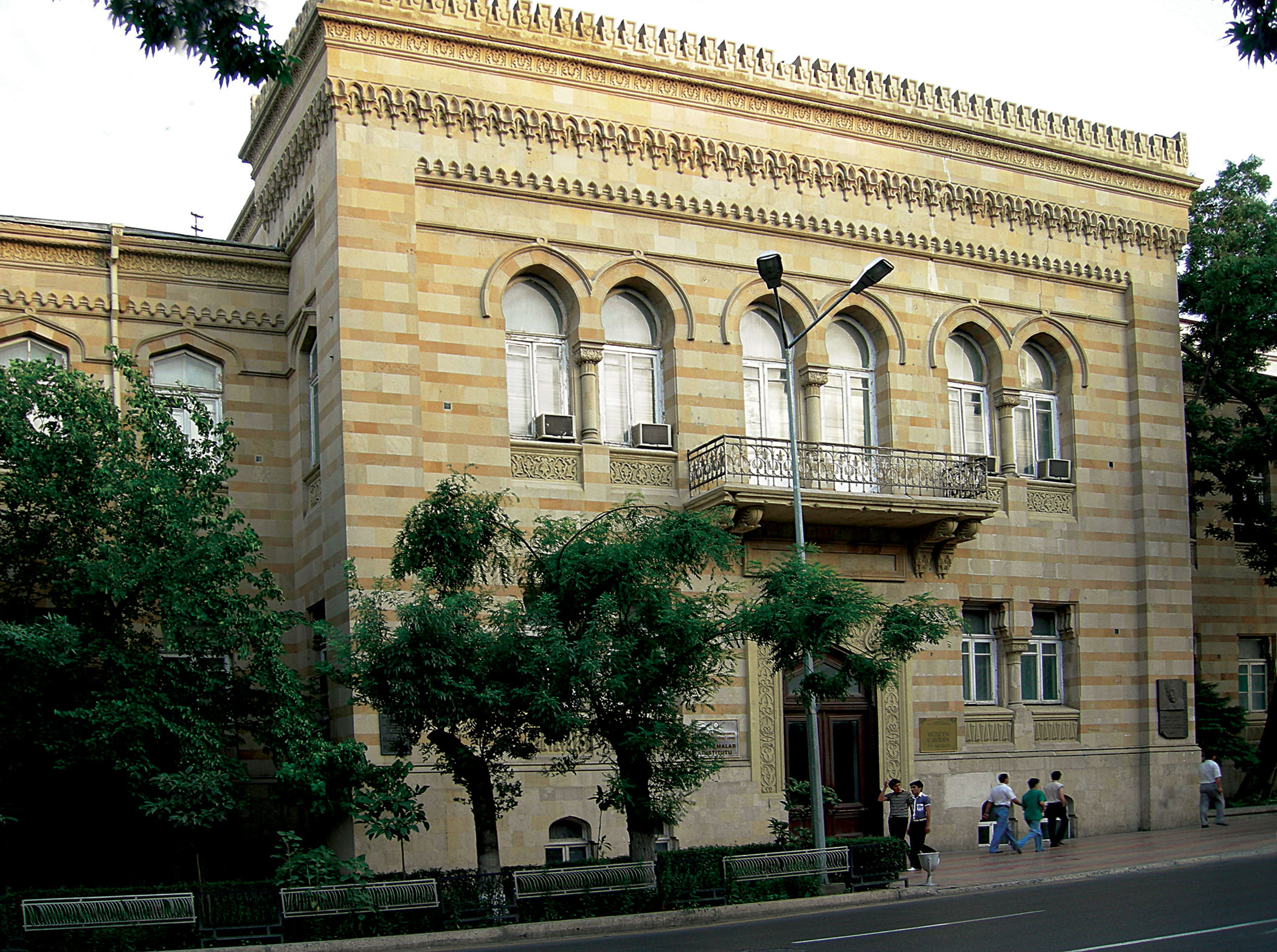
Institute of Manuscripts in Baku where the original documents of Yusif Vazir Chamanzaminli are archived, including diaries, articles, short stories, novels. Chamanzaminli's Fund is one of the largest literary collections, thanks to Kichik Khanim Ajalova (1875–1967), his mother-in-law, who hid his manuscripts during Stalin's Repressions.

== Life and career ==
Chamanzaminli was born the second son of seven children to Mirbaba Mirabdulla oghlu Vazirov (died 1906) and Seyid Aziza Seyid Husein gizi (died 1910) in the town of Shusha, which was then part of the Russian Empire. His father was a mugham teacher and a connoisseur of literature, who spoke Persian and Turkish and had travelled considerably throughout the region.

After graduating from the primary school of Blindman Khalifa in 1895, Chamanzaminli pursued his studies at the Realschule of Shusha. But then, the Armenian-Azerbaijani civil war broke out (1905–1906) and his family fled Shusha. As his father had just died, his mother, younger brother and sisters settled in Ashgabad, Turkmenistan, to be closer to relatives. Vazirov managed to get a meagre stipend with a few other students from Shusha to finish his education (1906–1909) at Realni High School in Baku. He published his first work in the local Azeri-language periodicals Sada and Molla Nasraddin. It was in the summer of 1907 when Yusif Vazirov went to visit his mother in Ashgabad that he met Berta Maiseyeva, a third year student at Ashgabad Gymnasium. She seems to be the prototype for the character of "Nino" in the novel "Ali and Nino," eventually published in 1937 in Vienna. Many of the historical references in the novel can be traced back to the period of time when Vazirov was a high school student in Baku, as revealed in his diaries.

In 1909, Chamanzaminli left for St. Petersburg to enroll in St. Petersburg State University of Architecture and Construction Institute for Civil Engineers but having realized that he would not pass the placement test in mathematics, since he was weak in math and hated it, Chamanzaminli withdrew his application. While in St. Petersburg, he wrote Jannatin gabzi ("A Passage to Heaven").

In 1910 Chamanzaminli was admitted to the St. Vladimir University in Kiev to study law. When World War I broke out, the students and staff of the university were transferred to Saratov (Volga region of Russia), where Chamanzaminli graduated in 1915. For a while he worked at the judiciary chamber of Saratov and later travelled to Galicia (Eastern Europe). There, reflecting on the February Revolution in Russia, he began Studentlar ("Students") and "In the Year 1917".

In late 1917, he returned to Kiev to establish an Azerbaijani cultural association. In 1918 he was appointed to represent the newly established Azerbaijan Democratic Republic in the Ukrainian People's Republic but there was so much political unrest and turmoil in the region, he was not able to establish an office there. He then moved to Simferopol, Crimea, where he worked for a while as a judiciary advisor.

There he published his research work Lithuanian Tatars dedicated to the history and culture of Lipka Tatars. At the same time, he popularized Azeri culture by publishing related articles, especially about literature, in the local newspapers. Then in 1919, he was appointed to open the Azerbaijan Embassy in Constantinople, Turkey. He managed only to set it up only briefly for a few months before the Bolsheviks took control of Baku, leaving him without job, salary, guidance as to what to do—essentially, without a passport and without a country.

Vazirov wrote at least two books that were published while he was in Turkey: (1) "A Survey of Azerbaijani Literature" (1921), and (2) "The History, Geography and Economy of Azerbaijan" (1921). Vazirov then left for France to join his younger brother Mir Abdulla, who was studying at the Institut d'Études Politiques de Paris and from which he graduated in 1925.

In Paris where thousands of émigrés had fled in desperation after the collapse of the Russian Empire, Vazirov was unable to find a job in his field. He tried to get a job driving a taxicab but twice failed the exam. He eventually managed to get a job working in an automobile locomotive factory in the Paris suburb of Clichy, Hauts-de-Seine. He also wrote for a local publication, entitled Les lettres orientales ("Eastern Letters").

== Return to Soviet Baku ==
After Miri's quite unexpected death, Vazirov saw little reason to continue living in Europe. He blamed Miri's death on poverty since they had not had enough money for medical care. Vazirov wrote Stalin: "Miri's death left me with no reason not to return to Azerbaijan. I promised myself to defend the new Azerbaijan by embracing education and culture with all my strength. For me, Motherland is like a long-awaited shore after a turbulent voyage at sea."

Vazirov resolved, despite serious danger, to try to return to his Homeland and work for the strength of the Azerbaijani people. Vazirov applied for permission to return to Azerbaijan SSR from Musabeyov who sought permission from Sergey Kirov for Vazirov's return. Permission was granted in late 1925 and Vazirov returned to Baku in the spring of 1926.

Upon his return, he taught languages at Azerbaijani colleges and translated various works of Russian writers into Azeri. In literary circles, he wrote several novels and became known by his penname Chamanzaminli. He took part in compiling the first Russian-Azeri Dictionary (1934).

== Stalin's Repressions – 1937 ==
In 1937, one of the most notorious years of Stalin's purges, there was an enormous effort on the part of Azerbaijan Writers' Union (as well as other Soviet entities) to "purge the ranks." Vazirov was among the 20 or so writers targeted. He tried to defend himself, claiming that he had been one of the most courageous writers fighting against religious abuse during the pre-Soviet days. At the Third Plenum of the Azerbaijan Writers' Union (March 1937), Chairman Seyfulla Shamilov criticized a list of Azerbaijani writers including Vazirov. On 9 June 1937, at least seven articles appeared in the newspaper Adabiyyat, accusing him of being a counter-revolutionary. He was criticized for introducing counter-revolutionary ideas in his antagonist characters, especially in his novels "Students" and "Maiden Spring."

Realizing the danger he was in, Chamanzaminli burned a large collection of his manuscripts. He was stripped of his membership in Azerbaijan's Writers' Union in 1937, which greatly paralyzed his efforts to gain any employment in his field.

Eager and willing to work and support his wife Bilgeyiz Ajalova and three children (Orkhan, 1928–2010), Fikrat (1929–2004) and Gulara (who was probably born around 1932 and who died shortly after World War II), he wrote a letter to Mir Jafar Baghirov, First Secretary of the Communist Party. A few weeks later, realizing that no answer was forthcoming, in desperation, Chamanzaminli wrote Soviet premier Joseph Stalin, providing a review of his literary career up to that point in his life. No answer came from Stalin and so he made trips to Ashgabad and Moscow in a desperate attempt to find work but none was to be found. Returning late one night to Baku, he went underground, and remained hidden away for months in his apartment – while neighbors thought he was still in Moscow. At that time he wrote one of his most important novels – "Between Two Worlds" (meaning Iran and Russia). The novel was never published during his lifetime.

Finally, he gained a position as a teacher of the Russian language in Urgench, Uzbekistan in 1938.

== Death in the GULAG – Stalin's political prison camps ==
But authorities eventually managed to track Vazirov down in Urgench, Uzbekistan, in 1940, at the Pedagogical Institute where he was helping to establish the Russian Department and they arrested him. He was brought back to Baku for a drawn-out interrogation that lasted six months. Chamanzaminli learned that Bakir Chobanzade, a Crimean Tatar linguist and academician, were among those who had implicated him. Clearly from photos, it can be seen that Vazirov was tortured during his interrogation period and his handwriting deteriorated drastically. None of his family members were allowed to visit him during this time but transcripts of the "interrogations" show that he never admitted to the Soviet government's false accusations, nor did he implicate any fellow Azerbaijanis in an attempt to get his own sentence reduced. Condemned on fabricated charges, Vazirov was sentenced to eight years of labor camps, which he served at Unzhlag at Sukhobezvodnaya railway station, Gorky Oblast, Russia. In January 1943, three years after his arrest, he died of malnutrition, disease (myocardial cardiac arrest, chronic bronchitis, tuberculosis and pellagra).

== Authorship of Ali and Nino ==
Extensive research by Azerbaijan International magazine into the authorship of the novel Ali and Nino, which was published under the pseudonym Kurban Said, points to the following conclusions:

(1) The core author of the novel "Ali and Nino" is Azerbaijani writer and statesman Yusif Vazir Chamanzaminli (1887–1943) as evidenced from the content of his diaries, autobiographical essays, short stories and articles. However, others argue that Lev Nussimbaum, who wrote under the pen name of Essad Bey, was the exclusive author. Some even dismiss the possibility that Chamanzaminli could possibly have authored this novel as it was first published in German, a language they insist he did not know. However, archival documents indicate that Yusif Vazirov did reasonably well in his German class in high school. However, to discredit Chamanzaminli's authorship simply on the grounds that he didn't know German is to ignore the political crisis in the 1920s and 1930s between world wars when hundreds of thousands of foreign refugees flocked to European capitals to escape the economic collapse of four of the world's six empires (Russian, Ottoman, Austro-Hungarian, and German). In their new environment, displaced intellectuals lost their reading public and were often at the mercy of literary brokers to get their works published. When Chamanzaminli left Paris and returned to Baku (which by that time had come under Soviet rule), one of his first short stories (1927)—"Notebook of a Refugee"—described the poverty-stricken conditions that refugee authors experienced, which forced them to accept 25 percent of whatever the European literary agents received.

(2) The fingerprints of Lev Nussimbaum (1905–1942), who wrote under the penname of Essad Bey, can be traced in the folkloric and legendary material in the novel (although much of it is neither culturally or ethnically reliable). Identical descriptions of such material can be traced to his earlier works as he had a tendency to repeat himself in subsequent works. Lev's lack of knowledge of the Azerbaijani language also contributed to his tendency to further distort historical record which is also evident in the novel. Archival documents indicate that Lev failed the one Azerbaijani language class that he took in high school Another disadvantage was that Lev did not know the Arabic script, the official alphabet at that time in Azerbaijan.

(3) Essad Bey took materials about Tbilisi and Persia directly from Georgian writer Grigol Robakidze (1882–1962) ("Das Schlangenhemd," Snake Slough, 1928). Research shows that Essad Bey personally knew Robakidze.

(4) Austrian Baroness Elfriede Ehrenfels (1894–1982) registered the work with German authorities, claiming that the pseudonym Kurban Said belonged to her, though evidence of her involvement in the actual writing of the novel has yet to be proven.

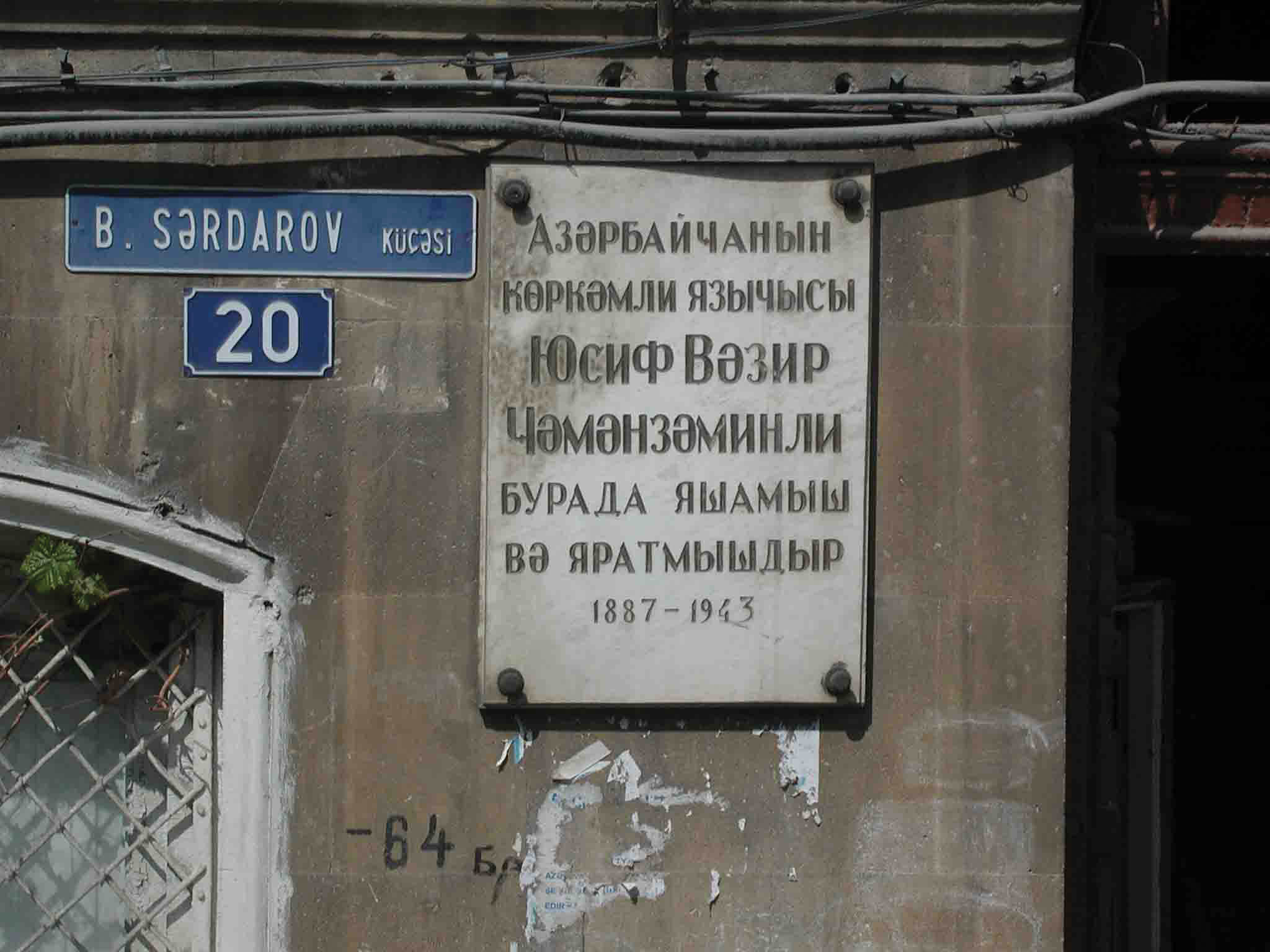
Plaque in Azerbaijani (Cyrillic script), which dates back to the Soviet period reads: "Prominent Azerbaijani writer Y.V. Chamanzaminli (1887–1943) lived and created his works here." The apartment was located at 20 Sardarov Street in Baku, Azerbaijan. This is written in the initial Russian-based Cyrillic, and not the Serbian-based script used in Azerbaijan until the end of communism.

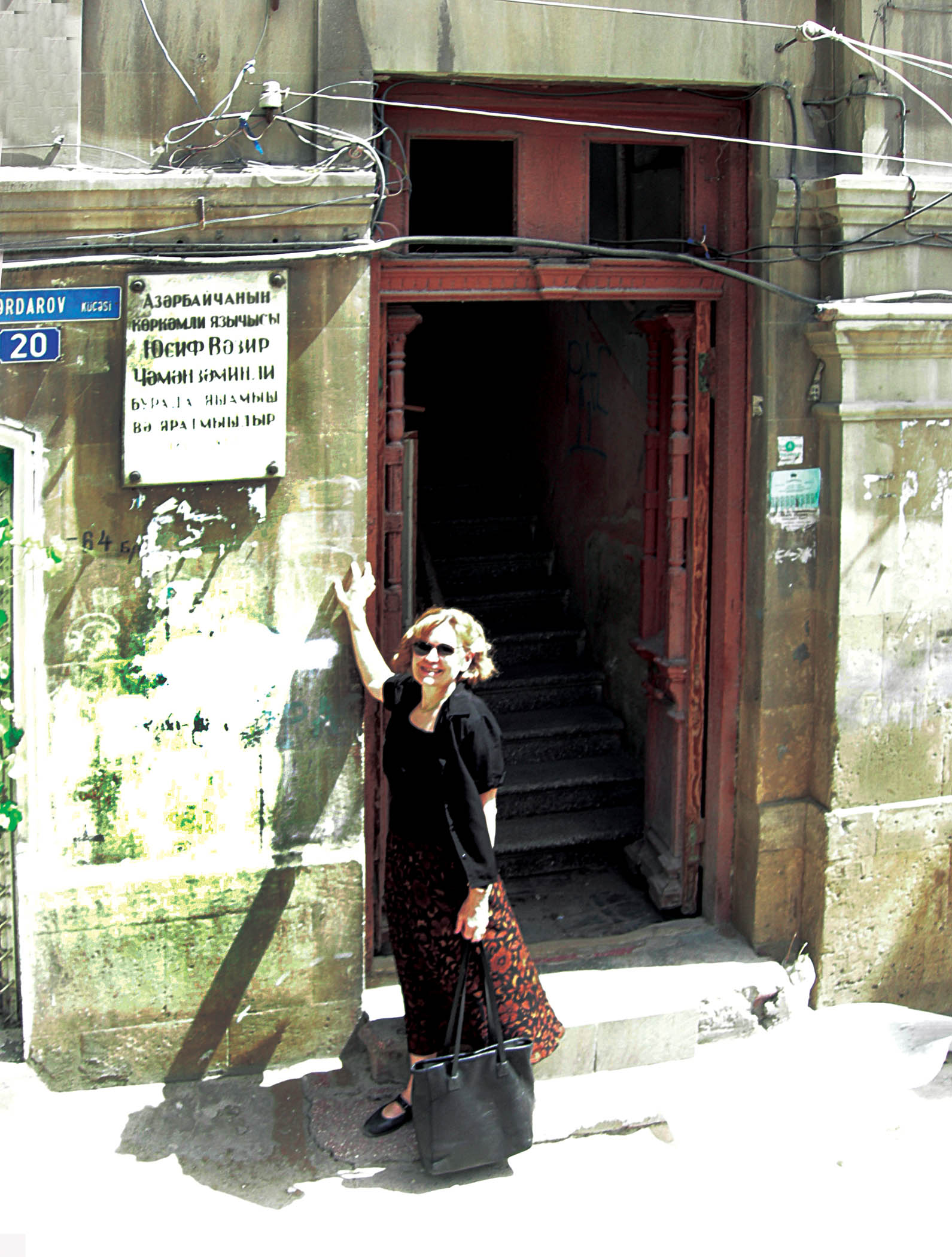
20 Sardarov Street, Baku, Azerbaijan – last residence of Yusif Vazir Chamanzaminli

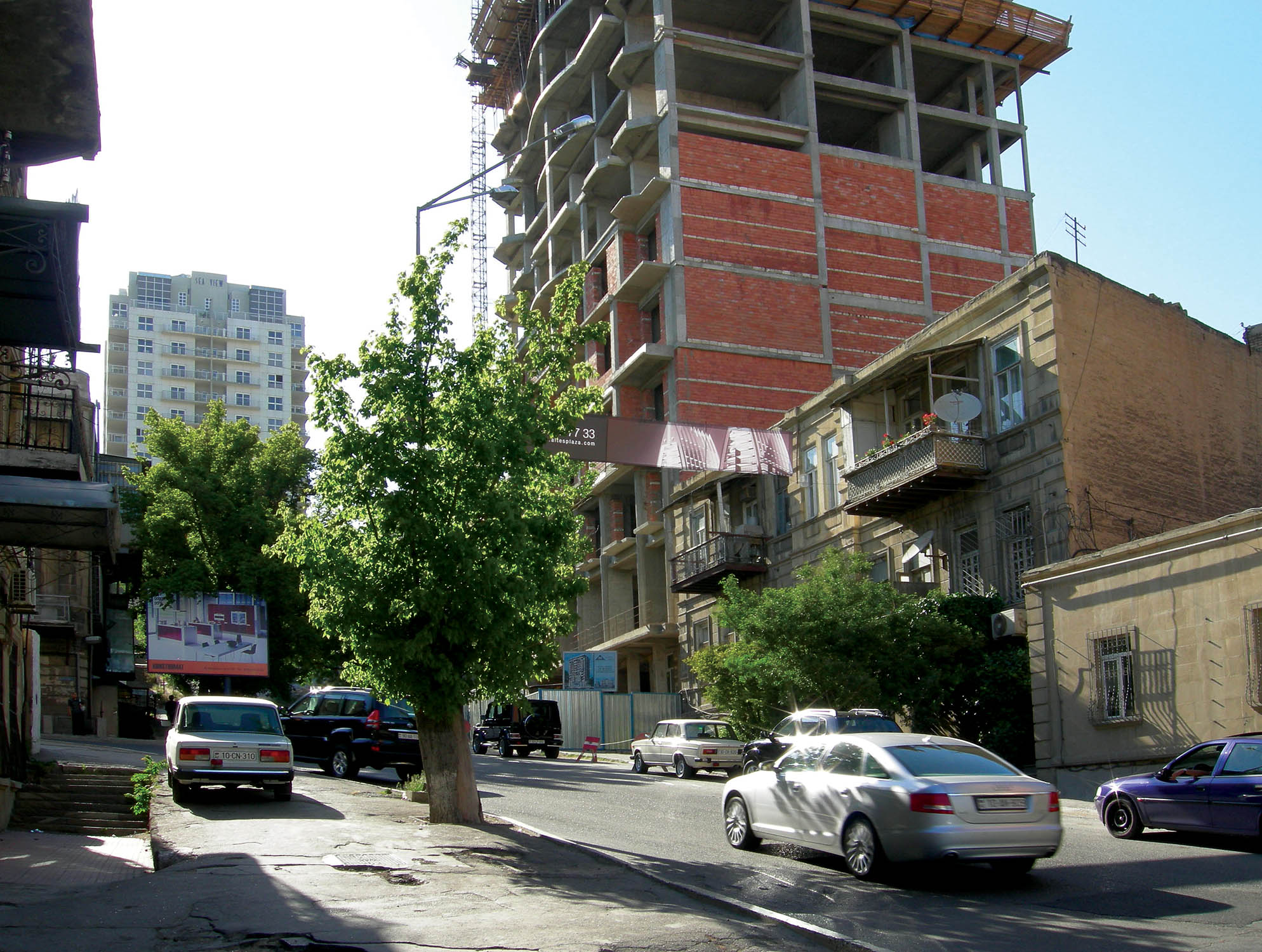
Sardarov Street, Baku. Chamanzaminli's apartment was on the ground floor, right corner (here located on the right side of the street, behind the little tree).

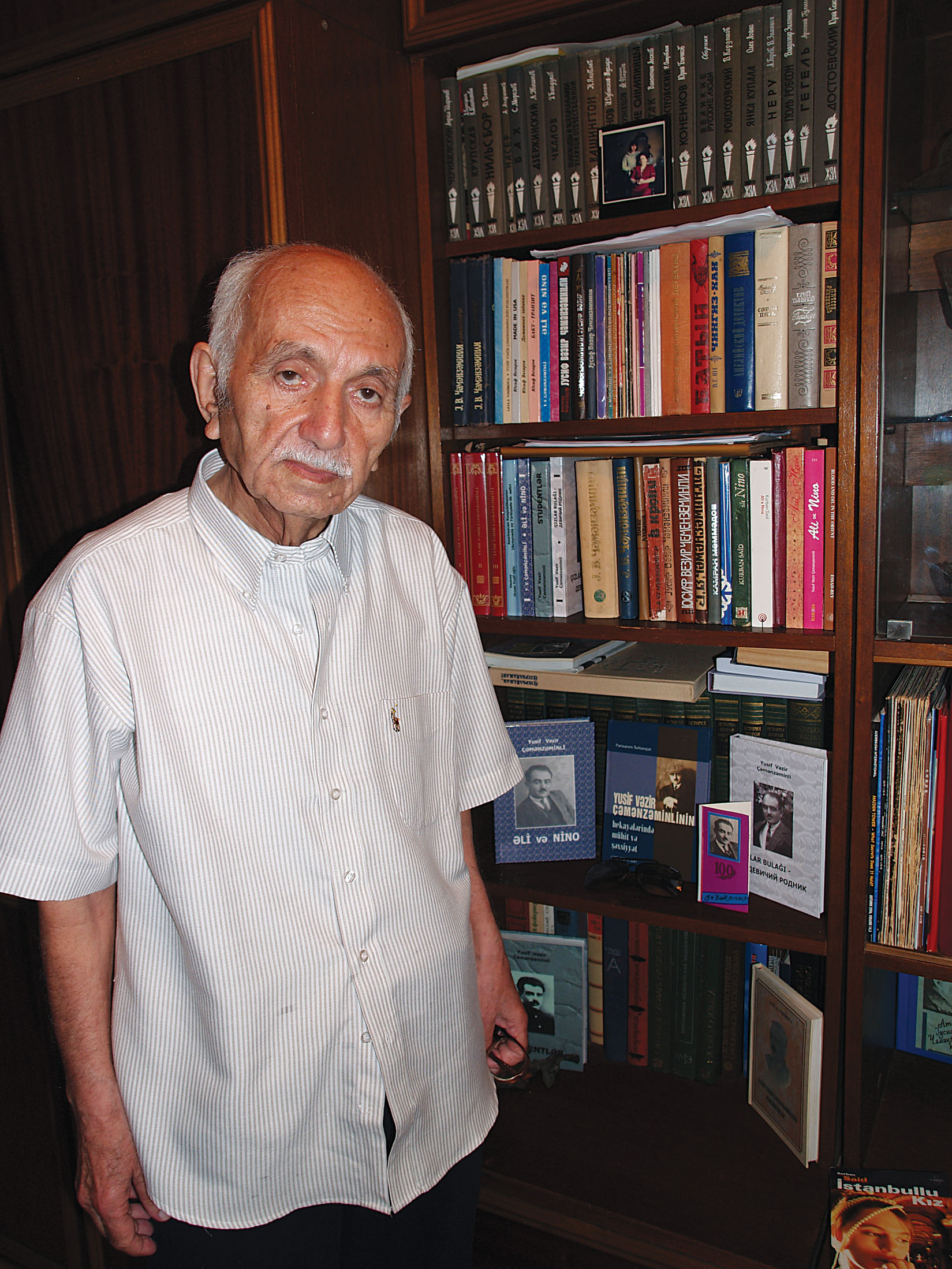
Orkhan Vazirov (1928–2010) with the collection of literary works written by his father Yusif Vazir Chamanzaminli.

== Pen names ==
Chamanzaminli is one of Yusif Vazirov's pennames. He adopted it in remembrance of the kindness of three brothers from a small remote village in Iran called "Chaman Zamin" which means "green or verdant meadow". In desperation, the brothers had come north to Shusha to escape the terrible drought in the Tabriz region of Iran at the end of 19th century. Vazirov's father had provided them with a place to stay. In turn, after he died and Yusif himself fell desperately ill with typhoid in 1906, the brothers came to his rescue. Vazirov made a vow that if he ever became a writer he would adopt the name of their village in gratitude.

Vazirov began using the Chamanzaminli penname in his literary works at least as early as 1911. When Vazirov returned to Soviet Azerbaijan in 1926, he again took up the name—this time as "Yusif Vazir Chamanzaminli".

However, literary works that are kept at the Baku Institute of Manuscripts show that Yusif Vazirov used at least 15 different pseudonyms to protect his identity starting as early as 1904 when he was only 17 years old. Often the names he chose hold symbolic meaning, such as "Badbakht" (Unlucky One), "Hagg Tarafdari" (Protector of Justice), "Musavi" (Equality), "Stradayushiy" (Sufferer), "Sarsam," (Crazy One).

In 1907, Vazirov, 20, wrote a Letter to the Editor of the satirical magazine "Molla Nasraddin" attacking the Muslim clergy in his hometown of Shusha. As a result, he received death threats. In his diaries, Vazirov acknowledges how foolish he was not to have used a pseudonym.

In 1911, Vazirov wrote under the name "Ali Khan Chamanzaminili" for the folktale "Malak Mammad" that he published in literary form for the first time. Curiously, "Ali Khan" is exactly the same name of the protagonist in "Ali and Nino".

== Literary works ==
- Core author of Ali and Nino (Vienna, E.P. Tal, 1937).
- Novel: Maiden Spring, novel (Baku: Azerneshr, 1934)
- Novel: Studentlar (Students), 1934
- Novel: Between Two Fires (known as "In Blood" during the Soviet Years), published posthumously, 1968
- Collected Essays: "If We Want our Independence" (Baku: Ganjlik, 1994)
- Collected Essays: "Who are We?" (Baku: Nurlan, 2004)
- Diaries, Minutes for Myself, Letters, etc.: (Baku, Nurlan, 2004)
- Satires (Hadaran-Padaran) (Baku: Nurlan, 2004)
- Folk tale: "Malikmammad" (Baku, Kaspiy, 1911)
