= The Snake's Skin =

1926 novel by Grigol Robakidze

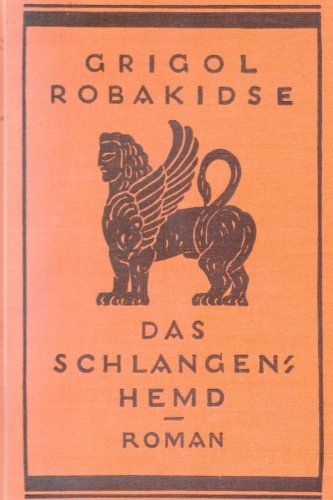
- Author: Grigol Robakidze
- Original title: გველის პერანგი
- Translator: Grigol Robakidze
- Language: Georgian
- Subject: Patriotism
- Genre: Modernist novel Philosophical fiction Magic realism
- Set in: Georgia, Persia, England
- Published: Tbilisi
- Publisher: Diederich Verlag
- Publication date: 1926, 1928 in German
- Publication place: Georgia
- Media type: Print (hardback)
- Pages: 409 pages

The Snake's Skin (Das Schlangenhemd) (also referred as The Snake's Slough) is a novel by prominent Georgian writer Grigol Robakidze. It was written and published in the Georgian and German languages.

== Background and reception ==
According to Grigol Robakidze's nephew, Rostom Lominashvili, "During the First World War, Grigol Robakidze was in Iran. It was there that The Snake's Skin took shape". Grigol Robakidze himself states that the idea for The Snake's Skin was generated in Iran: “The idea of The Snake’s Skin came to me in the summer of 1917 in Hamadan…”. In 1926 the novel The Snake’s Skin was published for the first time in Georgian, the language in which it was originally written. In 1928 Grigol Robakidze translated it himself into German, and left for Germany thereafter for its German publication, which included an introduction by Stefan Zweig a prominent Austrian writer of the time.

Prominent Georgian and German writers, literary critics and linguists appreciate not only literary part of the novel, but also its language phenomenon (Georgian as well as German) and called Grigol Robakidze a genius writer.

In 2005, Georgian author and researcher Tamar Injia claimed to discover that Grigol Robakdize's The Snake's Skin was extensively plagiarized by Kurban Said in his novel Ali and Nino: A Love Story. Injia's research findings were first published in a series of articles in the Georgian newspaper Our Literature (2003) and later printed as books Grigol Robakidze… Kurban Said – Literary Robbery (2005) in Georgian and Ali and Nino – Literary Robbery! (2009) in English.

The findings of professor Injia were supported and shared by the representatives from various literary circles, scholars and researchers from Georgia and the US: Gia Papuashvili – documentary movie producer and philologist; Levan Begadze – German linguist, Georgian literary critic and philologist; Zaza Alexidze – former Director of the Georgian National Center of Manuscripts, and discoverer and decipherer of the Caucasian Albanian written script; Betty Blair – researcher of authorship of Ali and Nino: A Love Story and founding editor of Azerbaijan International Magazine.

== Plot summary ==
The novel The Snake's Skin is about an entire universe, where the space is complete and united. The scene takes place at the entire planet: the West and the East; Russia, Europe and finally Robakidze's motherland – Georgia. Here one may also find an imaginary world of American billionaire living in his villa at Mediterranean Sea along with various prominent artists.

There is only one tense in The Snake’s Skin – present, but it includes past and future as well. The main thing is reality, but myths and legends are part of this reality. The way of thinking is not only particularly human, but at the same time metaphysical and idealistic.

The personages of the novel do not live in the particular time period, or represent persons with concrete nationality. The author describes a generalized citizen of the world that gets transformed into a particular person or in other words, returns to his roots (actual father, motherland), oneself, and the God. This is an adventure of Archibald Mekeshi's soul, taking place throughout the centuries.
