= Almuth =

Almuth is a German feminine given name.

Notable people with the name include:

- Almuth Beck (born 1940), German teacher and politician
- Almuth Berger (born 1943), German pastor
- Almuth Glittermann (1909–2003), Russian translator
- Almuth Lütkenhaus (1930–1996), German sculptor
- Almuth Schult (born 1991), German footballer

== See also ==
- German trawler V 622 Almuth, a Kriegsmarine minesweeper and vorpostenboot, a former fishing trawler; in service 1937–1944
- Almut, a German feminine given name
