= Almut =

Almut is feminine German given name. Notable people with the name include:

- Almut Brömmel (born 1935), German javelin and discus thrower
- Almut Burchard, German-Canadian mathematician
- Almut Hintze (born 1957), German academic, philologist, linguist and scholar
- Almut Iken (1933–2018), German glaciologist
- Almut Kemperdick (born 1963), German volleyball player
- Almut Lehmann (born 1953), German pair skater
- Almut Hege-Schöll (born 1958), German curler and curling coach
- Almut Sturm (born 1941), German tennis player

See also

- Almuth (disambiguation)
