= Jenia Graman =

Jenia (Jean) Graman, nee Almuth Gittermann (12 June 1909, in Odessa, Russian Empire – 28 April 2003, in London) was a dancer and translator, best known for her translation of Kurban Said's novel Ali and Nino which she translated from the original German into English. When her translation came out in 1970, it became the basis for translations of the novel into many other languages around the world.

Graman worked as a dancer in musicals in Nazi Germany. She emigrated to Britain in the 1950s and was naturalised as a British subject on 30 September 1960. She was described then as a commercial artist.

In 1967 she sought permission from the publisher of Ali and Nino to translate the novel.

She died in London on 28 April 2003.
