= Grigol Robakidze =

Georgian writer, publicist, and émigré leader

- გრიგოლ რობაქიძე
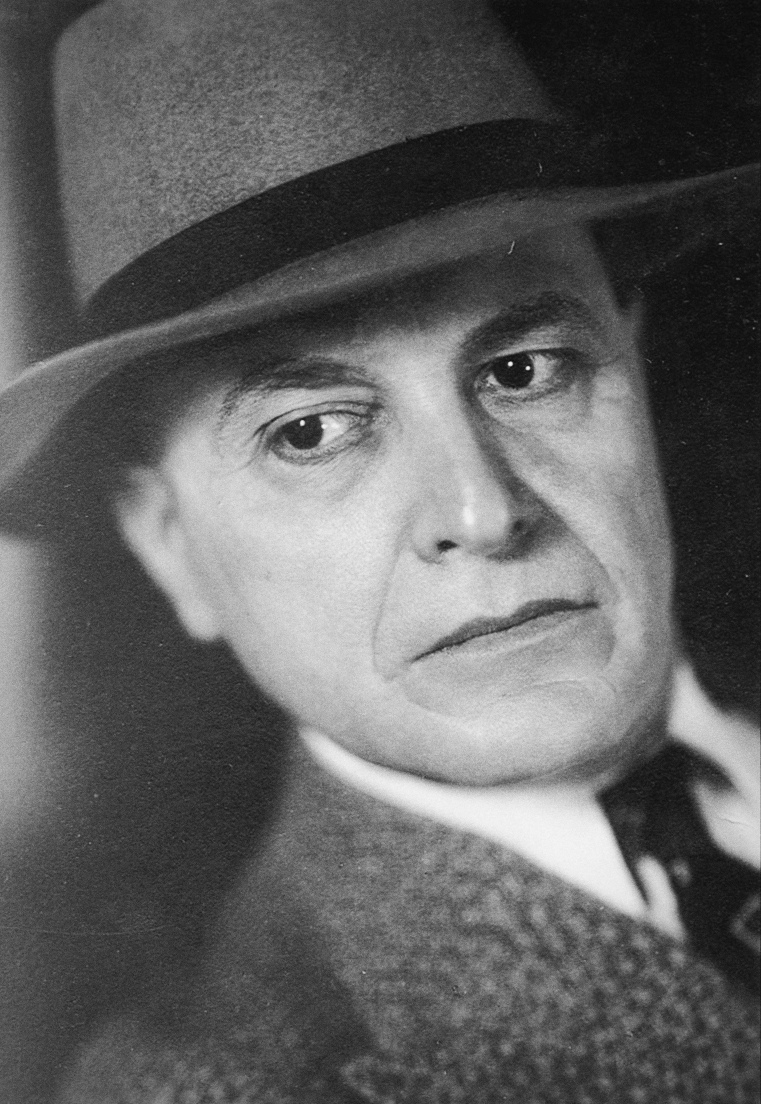
- Born: 28 October 1880; Sviri, Kutaisi Governorate, Russian Empire (now Georgia)
- Died: 19 November 1962 (aged 82); Geneva, Switzerland
- Occupations: Novelist; poet; playwright
- Writing career
- Notable works: Das Schlangenhemd The Snake's Skin (1926, in Georgian, 1928, in German)
- Movements: Modernism, Symbolism, Expressionism

Grigol Robakidze (Georgian: გრიგოლ რობაქიძე; October 28, 1880 – November 19, 1962) was a Georgian writer, publicist, and public figure primarily known for his prose and anti-Soviet émigré activities.

== Biography ==
He was born on October 28, 1880, in the village of Sviri in Imereti (west Georgia). After the graduation from Kutaisi Classical Gymnasium (1900), he took courses at the University of Tartu in Estonia and the University of Leipzig in Germany. Robakidze returned from Germany in 1908, and gradually became a leading person among the young Georgian symbolists. In 1915, he founded and led the Blue Horns, a new group of symbolist poets and writers which would later play an important role, particularly during the next two decades. Heavily influenced by Friedrich Wilhelm Nietzsche, his prose centered "on the search of mythological archetypes and their realisation in the life of a nation, and although its intrigue is always artificial and displays much of pose, he was highly respected both by his compatriots and a number of important European literary figures, such as Stefan Zweig and Nikos Kazantzakis." In 1917, he played a role in founding of the Union of Georgian Writers. He was involved in the national liberation movement of Georgia of 1914–1918. Robakidze got a diplomatic post in 1919, when he took part in the Paris Peace Conference as an executive secretary of the state delegation of the Democratic Republic of Georgia.

After annexation of Georgia by Soviet Russia in 1921, he remained in the country, but was known for his anti-Soviet sentiments. His famous play Lamara was staged by the leading Georgian director Sandro Akhmeteli in 1930, a performance which became a prize-winner at the 1930 Moscow Drama Olympiad.

Robakidze and his wife defected to Germany the same year. Despite Lavrenti Beria's objections, they had secured exit visas, ostensibly to supervise the translation of his works into German, and had decided not to return. This hardened Beria's resolve to deal with the rest of the Blue Horns. Lamara continued to be staged to prove the achievements of Soviet theatrical art, although without the name of the playwright being announced. His defection, along with Vladimir Mayakovsky's suicide, silenced most of his fellow poets for a long while. As an émigré, Robakidze had a rather unhappy life.

During World War II, he participated in the right-wing patriotic émigré organizations such as the Committee of Independence of Georgia (1941), the Union of Georgian Traditionalists (1942) and Tetri Giorgi. After the war, his two books on Benito Mussolini and Adolf Hitler were believed to favour Nazism. Famous representatives of the Georgian political emigration rejected this claim.

He died a broken man in Geneva on November 19, 1962. He was later reburied in the Cemetery of Leuville-sur-Orge, France, a burial ground of the Georgian emigration to Europe.

== Grigol Robakidze's Links to Kurban Said ==
In her book Ali and Nino – Literary Robbery!, Tamar Injia claims that Ali and Nino: A Love Story by Kurban Said (Austria, 1937) is extensively plagiarized from, and owes much of its existence to The Snake's Skin by Grigol Robakidze (Germany, 1928). By comparing passages from both novels (35 comprehensive extracts), the author argues that sections from Ali and Nino: A Love Story are copied from The Snake's Skin. Additionally, by analyzing the literal parallels in both novels, the author shows "side-by-side" similarities in content, namely repeated stories, myths, legends, characters and plot structures. The specific passages in question relate to excursions that Ali and Nino made to Tbilisi and to Iran.

Injia's research findings were first published in a series of articles in the Georgian newspaper Our Literature (2003) and later printed as books Grigol Robakidze… Kurban Said – Literary Robbery (2005) in Georgian and Ali and Nino – Literary Robbery! (2009) in English.

The findings of Injia were supported and shared by the representatives from various literary circles, scholars and researchers from Georgia and the US: Gia Papuashvili – documentary movie producer and philologist; Levan Bregadze – German linguist, Georgian literary critic and philologist; Zaza Alexidze – former Director of the Georgian National Center of Manuscripts, and discoverer and decipherer of the Caucasian Albanian written script; Betty Blair – researcher of authorship of Ali and Nino: A Love Story and founding editor of magazine Azerbaijan International.

== Main works ==
- "Georgian poet Vazha Pshavela".-"Russkaya Mysl", August, 1911 (in Russian)
- "Georgian Modernism".-Russian journal "ARS", Tbilisi, 1918 (in Russian)
- "Portraits", Tbilisi, 1919 (in Russian)
- "Lamara", Tbilisi, 1928 (in Georgian)
- "Das Schlangenhemd". Ed. by Stefan Zweig, Jena, 1928 (in German)
- "Megi - Ein georgisches Mädchen", Tübingen, 1932 (in German)
- "Die gemordete Seele", Jena, 1933 (in German)
- "Vražděná duše", Prague, 1934 (in Czech)
- "Der Ruf der Göttin", Jena, 1934 (in German),
- "Die Hüter des Grals", Jena, 1937 (in German),
- "Adolf Hitler in the Eyes of an Unknown Poet", 1937-38 (in German)
- "Mussolini", 1938-39 (in German)
- "Dämon und Mythos", Jena, 1935 (in German), the article "Stalin als Ahrimanische Macht" is part of this book
- "Kaukasische Novellen", Leipzig, 1932; München, 1979 (In German)
- "La Georgie en son image du monde".- "Bedi Kartlisa"- Le destin de la Georgie", No 16, Paris, 1954 (in French)
- "Vom Weltbild der Georgier".- "Atlantis", October, 1961, Zürich (in German)
- "Hymne an Orpheus" (Poem).- Collection "Grigol Robakidze", Munich, 1984 (in German).

== Scholarship ==
- Avetisian, Violeta. "The Third Shore of Grigol Robakidze and Vladimir Nabokov". Intellectual 16 (2011): 15–23, (in Russian).
- Dichter schreiben über sich selbst, Jena, 1940 (in German)
- Nikos Kazantzakis. Toda Raba, Paris, 1962 (in French)
- "Grigol Robakidze" (Collection), Published by Dr. Karlo Inasaridze, Munich, 1984 (in Georgian, German and French)
- Urushadze, Levan. "Grigol Robakidze as a Political Figure." Periodical Scientific Journal Prometheus 5, no. 17 (2005): 172–175 (in Georgian, Eng. summary).

== See also ==
- List of Eastern Bloc defectors
