= Ali and Nino =

1937 Azerbaijani novel

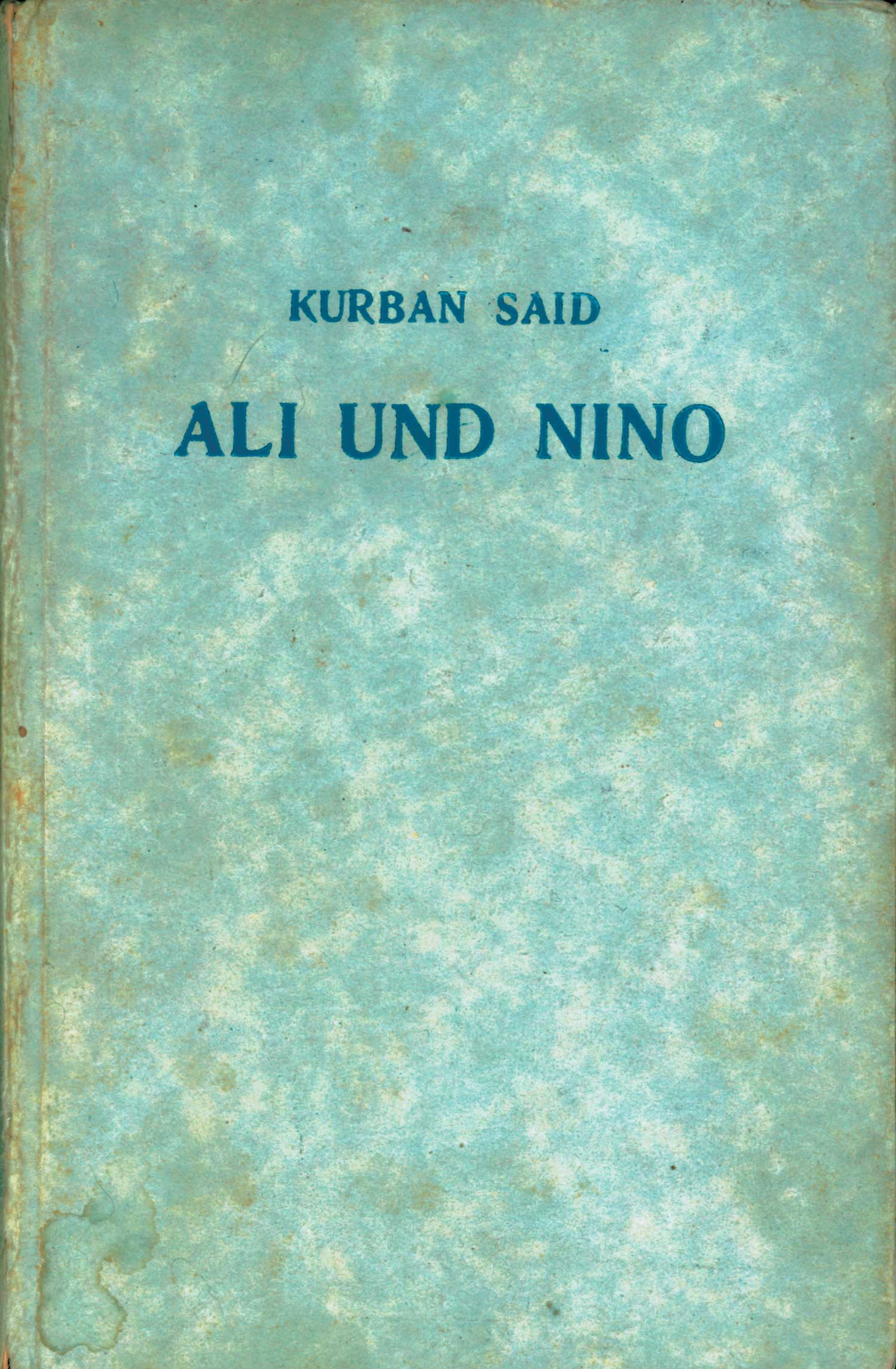
- Ali und Nino, first edition in the German language, published by Verlag E.P.Tal & Co, Vienna, 1937
- Author: Kurban Said (pseudonym)
- Language: German
- Genre: Historical romance
- Published: 1937 (German)
- Publisher: E.P. Tal Verlag (Vienna)
- Publication place: Azerbaijan
- Pages: 288
- ISBN: 9780385720403
- OCLC: 317332307
- Followed by: The Girl from the Golden Horn

Ali and Nino is a novel about a romance between a Muslim Azerbaijani boy and Christian Georgian girl in Baku in the years 1914–1920. It explores the dilemmas created by "European" rule over an "Oriental" society and presents a tableau portrait of Azerbaijan's capital, Baku, during the Azerbaijan Democratic Republic period that preceded the long era of Soviet rule. It was published under the pseudonym Kurban Said. The novel has been published in more than 30 languages, with more than 100 editions or reprints. The book was first published in Vienna in German in 1937, by E.P. Tal Verlag. It is widely regarded as a literary masterpiece and since its rediscovery and global circulation, which began in 1970, it is commonly considered the national novel of Azerbaijan. The English translation, by Jenia Graman, was published in 1970.

There has been a good deal of interest in the authorship of Ali and Nino. The true identity behind the pseudonym "Kurban Said" has been the subject of some dispute. The case for Lev Nussimbaum, aka Essad Bey, as the author originally surfaced in 1944. In Tom Reiss's 2005 international bestseller The Orientalist: Solving the Mystery of a Strange and Dangerous Life, Reiss makes a thorough case that the novel is the work of Nussimbaum, which continues a claim dating to Nussimbaum's correspondence and writings 1938–1942 and the writings of Ahmed Giamil Vacca-Mazzara in the 1940s. A claim for Yusif Vazir Chamanzaminli as author originated in 1971. The argument for Chamanzaminli was presented in a special 2011 issue of Azerbaijan International entitled Ali and Nino: The Business of Literature, in which Betty Blair argued that Nussimbaum merely embellished a manuscript of which she surmises that Chamanzaminli must be the "core author", a position that had already been advanced by Chamanaminli's sons and their supporters for some years. The novel's copyright holder, Leela Ehrenfels, maintains that her aunt the Baroness Elfriede Ehrenfels von Bodmershof authored the book, mainly because the book's publishing contract and subsequent catalog record identify her as Kurban Said, though few support this as proof of her authorship.

== Plot ==
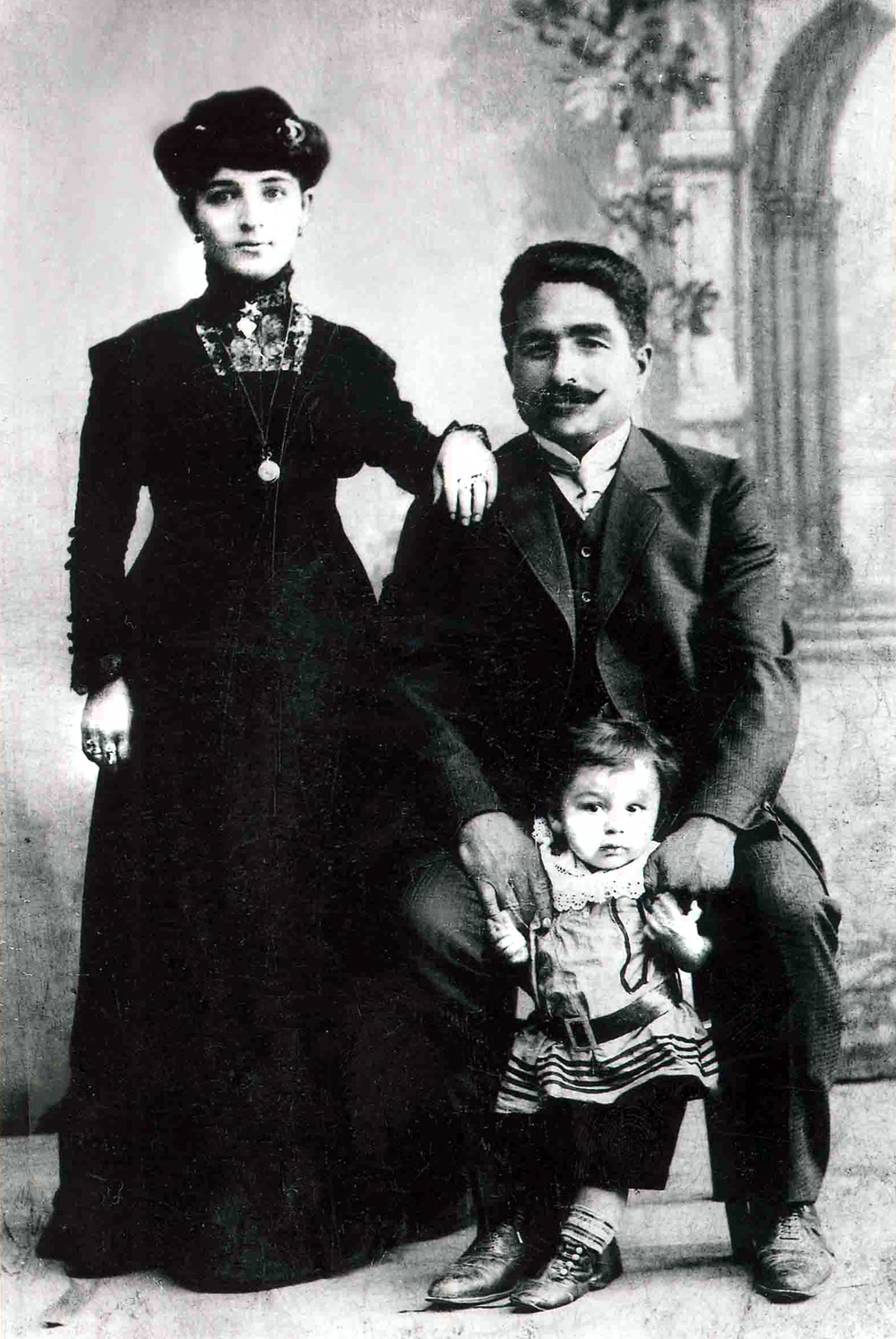
A cross-cultural family in Baku: Alexandra, a Georgian, her Azerbaijani husband Alipasha Aliyev, and their daughter Tamara (early 1900s).

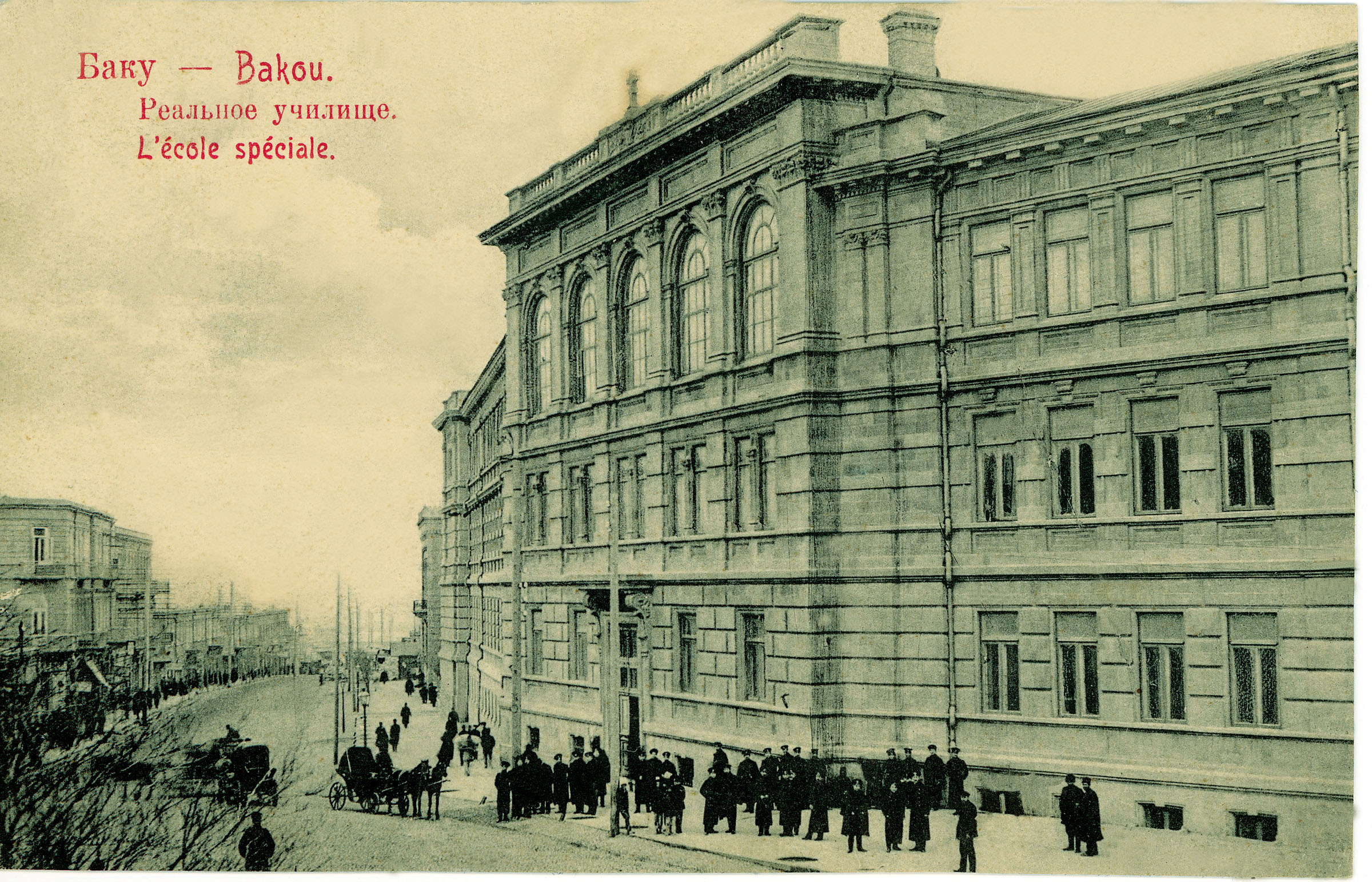
Baku Realni School, the setting of Ali and Nino's first scene, now houses the University of Economics

It is the early 1910s in Baku, Azerbaijan, under Russian control. Ali Khan Shirvanshir and Nino Kipiani are both still at school, but have loved each other for many years. He belongs to a distinguished Azerbaijani Muslim family. Despite his European education, he feels deeply that he is Asian. She belongs to a distinguished Georgian family, and the Russian authorities have permitted her to use the title 'Princess'. She is a Christian, and culturally European.

The novel is related in the first person by Ali. There are detailed descriptions of the locales and their customs.

Russia goes to war (in 1914); some of Ali's Muslim friends eagerly join the Russian army, but he feels it is a Christians' war. Then the Ottoman Empire (Turkey) declares war on Russia; the Ottomans are Muslim, but Sunnites, while the Azerbaijanis are Shiites. There is bafflement, and uncertainty about the future.

Ali's father permits him to marry Nino. Nino's father permits her to marry in a year's time, when she has finished school; his permission is apparently partly thanks to the persuasion of Ali's friend Melek Nacharyan, a (Christian) Armenian. But, totally unexpectedly, Nacharyan kidnaps Nino, persuading her that she will be safe with him whatever happens in the war, and drives away from Baku with her. On the unpaved road, Ali overtakes his car on horseback, and stabs him to death. He is entitled to kill Nino as well, but spares her, and orders his companions not to harm her.

To escape the revenge of Nacharyan's family, Ali hides in a mountain village in Dagestan. After a time, Nino joins him; they still love each other. They are married, and live in blissful poverty. Then the news comes: the Tsar has been deposed, the government of Baku has evaporated, and all the Nacharyan family have left. Ali and Nino return to Baku.

Baku becomes surrounded by an irregular Russian army seeking loot. Ali joins the defenders; Nino refuses to take shelter, and aids behind the front line. But they have to flee, and the Shirvanshir house is stripped by looters. With Ali's father they flee to Persia, which is at peace. Ali and Nino stay in Tehran in great comfort, but she is confined to the harem and is deeply discontented. Ali joins the parade on Muharram and comes home bloodied, to Nino's extreme distress.

In the war, the Turks begin to prevail against Russia. The Azerbaijan Democratic Republic is declared, and the Turks occupy Baku. Ali and Nino return, and she takes charge of renovating and refurnishing the Shirvanshir house. It is a happy period. But the Turks are forced to make peace and withdraw, and their place is taken by a British occupation (and protection) force. The Republic still exists and Ali and Nino, who both speak English, serve as hosts for government events. On her own secret initiative, Nino arranges for them to be posted to the embassy in Paris, but Ali cannot bear to leave Baku, and she yields to him and apologises. She gives birth to a daughter.

The war has ended, and the British troops are going to be withdrawn. The Russians are pressing again. In the hot weather, Ali, Nino, and the baby go to his estate near the Azerbaijani town of Ganja. They cut themselves off from news and events and are very happy. But the news comes: the Russians have taken Baku, and Ganja is coming under attack by a large force. Nino flees to Georgia with their daughter, but Ali refuses to leave. He is killed defending the town. (The Azerbaijan Democratic Republic fell in 1920 and the country became part of the Soviet Union.)

== Art, theater, and film related to Ali and Nino ==
In 1998 Hans de Weers of Amsterdam-based Egmond Film & Television, sought to find American partners for a film adaptation of Ali & Nino, which was to be shot in English and written by Academy Award-winning Azerbaijani screenwriter Rustam Ibragimbekov. De Weers was reported to have "pieced together 30% of the $8 million budget from the Netherlands and Azerbaijan."

In 2004 the Dutch film company Zeppers Film & TV, in a coproduction with NPS, released a 90-minute documentary by Dutch director Jos de Putter entitled Alias Kurban Said. The film examines the disagreements over the novel's authorship. Variety called it a "Magnificent historical whodunit, wherein crumbling photographs, yellowing documents, and forgotten reels of 35 mm film are invested with tremendous evocative power." The film shows documentary evidence that Abraham Nussimbaum was a proprietor of oil wells sold to the Nobel firm in 1913. The film was an official selection of the Tribeca Film Festival, the International Film Festival, Rotterdam, and the 2005 Netherlands Film Festival. Its music won the prize for Best Music at the Netherlands Film Festival.

Ali and Nino was adapted as a play at the Baku Municipal Theater in 2007. The Azerbaijani theater company that staged it in 2007 also performed the play at an international theater festival in Moscow in 2012.

In February 2010 an Azerbaijani news organization reported that Georgian film director Giorgi Toradze was planning to make a "documentary" about the "creation" of Ali and Nino, though the description of the film in the news report suggested that it would be a fictional rendition. According to the report, the project "has been submitted to the Azerbaijani Ministry of Culture and Tourism by film producer Giorgi Sturua."

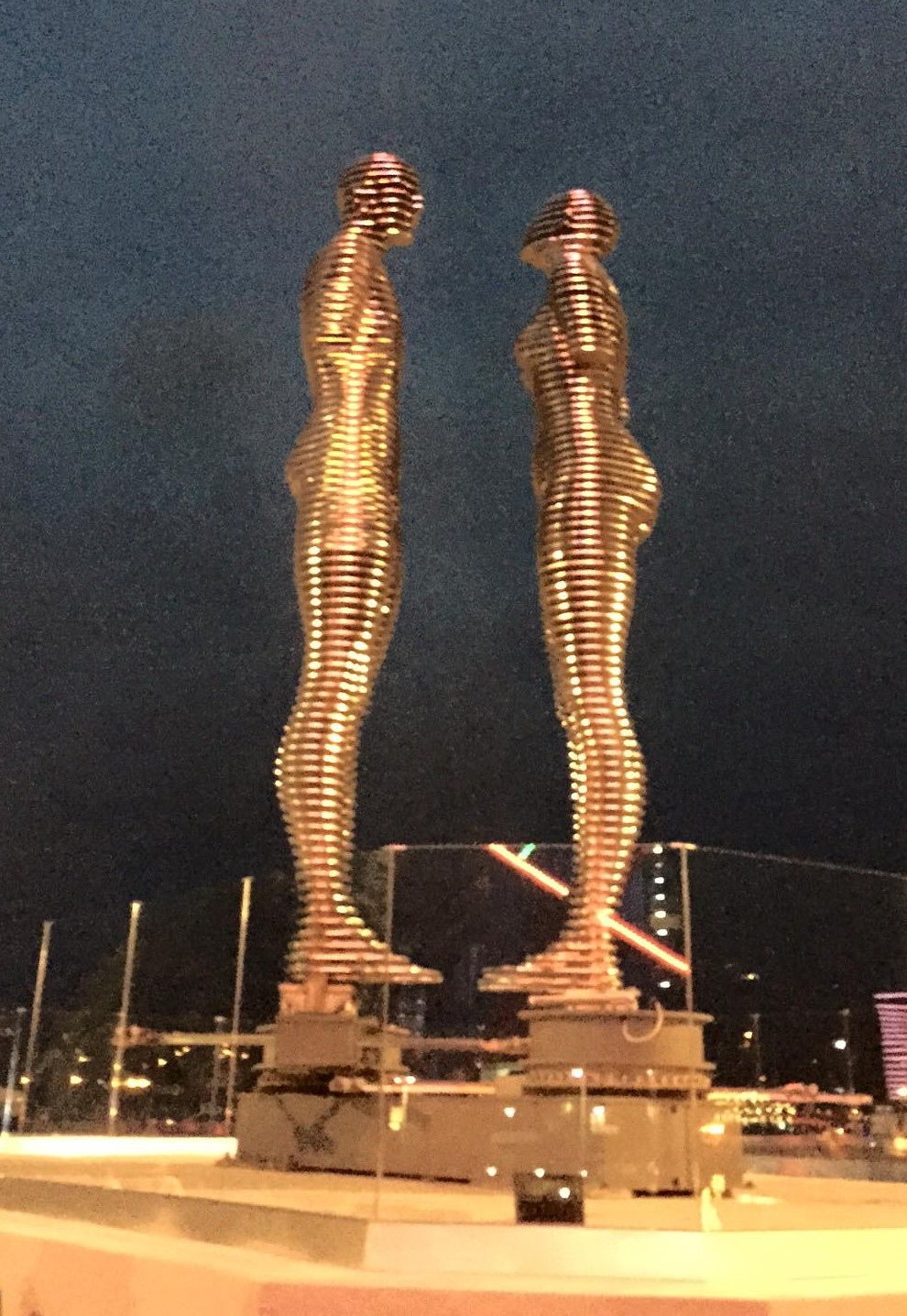
Ali and Nino statue in Batumi, Georgia. The statues move towards and through one another, but never touch.

A moving metal sculpture created by Georgian sculptor Tamara Kvesitadze in 2007, titled "Man and Woman", which is said to have been well received at the Venice Biennale of 2007, was installed in Batumi, Georgia in 2010 and re-titled "Ali and Nino", after the title characters of the Kurban Said novel. The novel was reportedly Kvesitadze's inspiration for the work. See the sculptor's web site in which the sculpture is still titled "Man and Woman"

A "musical re-imagining" of the novel, titled In the Footsteps of Ali and Nino, premiered in Paris at the Richelieu Amphitheater of University of Paris IV, Paris-Sorbonne in April 2012. Its "originator, project leader and pianist" was Azerbaijani pianist Saida Zulfugarova. Her "soundtrack" to the novel used "both Georgian and Azerbaijani traditional music and works by Azer Rzaev, Uzeyir Hajibeyli, Vagif Mustafazadeh, Fritz Kreisler and, of course, Kara Karayev, amongst many others." It was directed by Charlotte Loriot.

As of 2013, the novel is being adapted for a film by British screenwriter and playwright Christopher Hampton. Asif Kapadia has been named as director and production of the film is slated to start in 2014. The film's producer is Leyla Aliyeva, Vice President of the Heydar Aliyev Foundation.

== Authorship debate ==
For decades, there has been a controversy about the identity of Kurban Said, the pseudonym used to hide the identity of the author of this novel.

No one has located or identified any existing manuscript of Ali and Nino. The publisher, Lucy Tal, claims that all papers were deliberately destroyed when the Nazis entered Vienna. The closest anyone has come to such a find is Mireille Ehrenfels-Abeille, who claims in the 2004 film Alias Kurban Said to possess half of the manuscript of The Girl From the Golden Horn, the other novel published under the name Kurban Said. In the film itself, however, she was unable to locate the manuscript in her home and said that in fact she may not have seen it for ten or twenty years.

=== The case for Lev Nussimbaum's authorship ===
The claim that Lev Nussimbaum was the novel's author began circulating in 1944, when an Italian translation of the novel appeared, listing the author as "Mohammed Essad Bey". Tom Reiss notes this as "a first posthumous restoration" of Nussimbaum's authorship. (This Italian edition was brought to press by Dr. Ahmed Giamil Vacca-Mazzara (né Bello Vacca), who claimed himself to be Kurban Said and denied that Essad Bey was a Jew named Lev Nussimbaum.). When the novel was translated into English by Jenia Graman and published by Random House in 1970, John Wain, the author of the introduction, described the figure behind the name Kurban Said, without naming him, as having the biographical attributes of Nussimbaum. Assertions that Nussimbaum was the author were occasionally repeated thereafter.

Azerbaijani translator Charkaz Qurbanov, identified in the list of interviewees at the end of the film, Alias Kurban Said as "Cherkes Burbanly" identifies himself (as transcribed and transliterated in the English subtitles) as "Cherkes Qurbanov has argued, in a discussion shown in the film Alias Kurban Said, that "Kurban Said is the literary pseudonym of Mohammed Essad Bey. Statistics have shown, and so has my research, that the novels written by Essad Bey and Kurban Said are in exactly the same style. There is no difference. In Essad Bey's work you see Azerbeidshan [i.e., Azerbaijan] underneath." Another participant, identified in the list of interviewees at the end of the film Alias Kurban Said as "Zeydulla Achaev". It may be that this person is the man more commonly known as Zeydulla Ağayevdən, who has translated Ali and Nino into Azeri. The discussion said "The text is German, but it is an Azerbeidshan [i.e., Azerbaijani] type of German. Essad Bey's German is what a real German would never use. The sentence structure shows that he is not German."

==== Documentary evidence for Lev Nussimbaum's authorship ====
There are three documents written by people who knew Nussimbaum attesting that he was the author of the book.

One is a letter published in the New York Times in August 1971 from Bertha Pauli, an Austrian literary agent who knew Nussimbaum in Vienna from 1933 to 1938 and had helped him get publishing opportunities through a writers' cooperative called Austrian Correspondence (which Pauli said she "had organized to provide authors whose work was 'undesirable' in the Third Reich with opportunities for publication elsewhere"). Pauli had also negotiated the contract for the second Kurban Said novel, The Girl from the Golden Horn. Describing herself as Nussimbaum's "colleague and friend", Pauli wrote to the New York Times in 1971 that she had "read the novel at the time of its successful, first publication, 1937, in my native Vienna and talked to the author himself about it." She remarked that "The new, excellent English translation brings the German original vividly to my mind; I seem to hear Essad talking again in his particularly witty way."

Another testimonial is by Baron Omar Rolf von Ehrenfels in his foreword to a 1973 Swiss edition of the second Kurban Said novel, The Girl From the Golden Horn. Omar Rolf von Ehrenfels was the husband of Baroness Elfriede Ehrenfels von Bodmershof and coincidentally the father of Leela Ehrenfels, the current copyright holder. The complicated story is told by Leela Ehrenfels in "'Ali and Nino'. Identifying "Kurban Said" with the man he would have known in the 1930s as Nussimbaum/Bey, the baron writes: "As a young man I founded the 'Orient-Bund' for Afro-Asian students in Vienna and through it I became friends with the quietly observing Azerbaijani Kurban Said.... My way brought me shortly after that to India, from where I returned to Europe for the first time in 1954 and immediately went to visit the traditional Muslim grave of my then apparently forgotten friend which stood outside the wall of the cemetery in Positano."

Lucy Tal, the spouse of E. P. Tal, the novel's original 1937 publisher, believed that "Essad Bey" (Nussimbaum) had probably written it but that she was not sure as her husband Peter had dealt with the contracts but had died suddenly of a heart attack and she had fled Vienna with the Anschluss. Furthermore, she did not trust Essad Bey in regard to the contracts: "Essad sometimes was the real Oriental fairytale story teller. What was true or not true did not always bother him much."

==== Tom Reiss's case for Lev Nussimbaum's authorship ====
Tom Reiss has argued—first in a 1999 article in The New Yorker and then at greater length in his 2005 biography of Nussimbaum, The Orientalist—that it is "almost certain that Kurban Said was a cover for him so that he could continue to receive royalties from his work." Reiss cites and quotes documentary evidence not only linking the pseudonym Kurban Said to Nussimbaum and Baroness Elfriede Ehrenfels von Bodmershof, but also showing reasons that the Jewish Nussimbaum would have needed a new pseudonym after he was expelled from the (Nazi) German Writers Union in 1935, that he received income from books published under that name, and that he himself claimed authorship of Ali and Nino.

===== Tom Reiss's documentary evidence for Lev Nussimbaum's authorship =====
From the beginning, in 1937 and 1938 Baroness Ehrenfels held the legal copyright to the works of Kurban Said, a copyright that has now passed by inheritance to her niece Leela Ehrenfels. Leela Ehrenfels's lawyer, Heinz Barazon, has successfully defended the Ehrenfels family's ownership of the copyright to Ali and Nino. Reiss argues, however, that rather than being the actual author behind the name Kurban Said, Baroness Ehrenfels instead acted as an "Aryanizer" for Nussimbaum, meaning she took legal ownership of the pseudonym Kurban Said while passing income to him generated from books published under that name. Heinz Barazon, Reiss reports, pointed out that a publishing contract for Ali and Nino was signed in Vienna on April 20, 1937, well before Nussimbaum, as a Jew, would have lost the right to publish in the wake of the Anschluss, or Nazi German annexation of Austria, which took place in March 1938.

Reiss counters Barazon's point by arguing that Nussimbaum had an economic incentive to publish under a pseudonym owned by his friend the Baroness Ehrenfels because, as opposed to Austria and Switzerland, where Nussimbaum could have published under his pen name Essad Bey, Nazi-controlled Germany was the largest market by far for German-language publications. Reiss paraphrases Professor Murray Hall, an expert on publishing in interwar Austria, who told him "It wasn't profitable to publish a book if you could not sell it in Germany, so Austrian publishers needed to get their books past the Nazi censors to reach the majority of the German-reading public." This theory is supported by Bertha Pauli's 1971 letter to the New York Times, in which she wrote that a reason Nussimbaum may have used the pseudonym for his work in this period was that "as 'Kurban Said' it could still be sold in the German market."

Reiss writes of finding "a trail of letters" in "the files of the Italian Fascist Political Police in Rome" attesting that the Nazi police apparatus had thwarted an effort by Nussimbaum to sell his work in Nazi Germany. He cites a July 8, 1937, internal note from an Italian police service showing that the service believed Nussimbaum/Bey had "tried to smuggle" his works into Germany but that "the trick was, however, discovered." "Though this does not prove," concluded Reiss, "that Essad [Bey, Lev Nussimbaum's adopted name] was concealing his identity behind Kurban Said, it shows that he had cause to."

Reiss further quotes Nussimbaum's correspondence with Baron Omar-Rolf Ehrenfels in 1938 to show that Nussimbaum received royalty payments for Kurban Said publications via Baroness Ehrenfels, whom he referred to as "Mrs. Kurban Said". (Leela Ehrenfels cites a September 14, 1938, letter from "Essad Bey" to Baroness Ehrenfels, written in Positano, Italy, in which he again refers to her as "Mrs. Kurban Said" and congratulates her on something unmentioned – Leela Ehrenfels interprets this as a reference to The Girl From the Golden Horn.)

Reiss also quotes letters in which Nussimbaum unequivocally affirms being the novel's author. In one Nussimbaum states directly that he was using Baroness Ehrenfels as a legal cover in order to circumvent the ban on his work in Nazi Germany: Nussimbaum explains that Ali and Nino could still be published everywhere, since "according to the law on pseudonyms, K.S. is a woman! A young Viennese baroness, who is even a member of the Kulturkammer!", the German Writers' Union from which Nussimbaum had been expelled.

In this same letter Nussimbaum recommended to his addressee that "she buy a copy of Ali and Nino herself, bragging that it was his favorite of his own books." In another letter, Nussimbaum wrote of having had only two writing experience in which "I thought neither of the publishing company, nor of royalties, but just wrote happily away. These were the books Stalin and Ali and Nino," adding that "The heroes of the novel simply come to me demanding, 'Give us shape' — 'we also possess certain characteristics that you've left out and we want to travel, among other things.' " (Betty Blair has interpreted this statement as an "admission" that Nussimbaum had "gained access to the original manuscripts" already written by someone else, Yusif Vavir Chamanzaminli, and had "embellished them.") Reiss also quotes other letters in which Nussimbaum identifies himself as Kurban Said. In his final, unpublished manuscript, Der Mann der Nichts von der Liebe Verstand, Nussimbaum also refers to himself as "Ali."

Thus, while Reiss has not claimed absolute proof that Nussimbaum, rather than Ehrenfels or Chamanzaminli, is the primary author, he does cite documentary evidence showing that Nussimbaum had a need in 1937 to "Aryanize" his publications in order to continue to generate income from them, was receiving income from checks written to the name of Kurban Said, made several documented references identifying himself as Kurban Said, and continued to use the pseudonym on his final, unpublished manuscript Der Mann der Nichts von der Liebe Verstand.

===== Tom Reiss's textual comparisons =====
In addition to the documentary evidence Reiss offers for Lev Nussimbaum's authorship, Reiss also suggests several interpretive parallels between Nussimbaum's known life experiences and his writings under the pseudonym Essad Bey.

In The Orientalist Reiss cites the testimony of Alexandre Brailowski (aka Alex Brailow), a schoolmate of Lev Nussimbaum's at the Russian gymnasium in Charlottenburg, Berlin. It is not clear from Reiss's account whether Brailow had been in touch with Nussimbaum during the 1930s, particularly in 1937 when Ali and Nino was first published in Vienna; in any case Reiss does not report that Brailow claimed receiving from Nussimbaum (or anyone else) any verbal or written acknowledgement of Nussimbaum's authorship. Reiss quotes Brailow, in his unpublished memoirs, as remembering that Nussimbaum had a "talent for telling stories." Reiss further cites Brailow's unpublished introduction to a planned book entitled The Oriental Tales of Essad-Bey (a collection of Nussimbaum's early writings in Brailow's possession), in which Brailow interpreted characters in Ali and Nino as autobiographical references to Nussimbaum's schoolmates from his gymnasium. The Nino character, Brailow believed, was based on Nussimbaum's teenage love interest Zhenia Flatt. Reiss writes that because Zhenia Flatt "transferred her affections... to an older man named Yashenka," Brailow "always believed that Yasha was Lev's model for Nachararyan, the 'evil Armenian' in Ali and Nino, who is Ali's rival for Nino's love." Brailow wrote: "The whole love affair, including the elopement of Nino and the subsequent pursuit and killing of Nachararyan, is as much of a wish-fulfillment as is the autobiography of Ali whose adolescence and youth are a curious mixture of Essad's own and of what he would have liked them to be." Reiss also notes that Brailow also remembered an incident that recalls the moment in Ali and Nino in which Ali murders Nachararyan: "one day he pulled a knife on his tormentor and threatened to cut his throat. Brailow recalled that 'Essad, besides being a nervous type, seemed to indulge in outbursts of murderous rage, perhaps because he felt that this was his obligation as an 'Oriental' for whom revenge would be a sacred duty.' Brailow intervened to prevent his friend's 'Caucasian temper' from leading to murder."

Reiss asserts that "though clearly juvenilia," Nussimbaum's unpublished early stories "had an irony that was instantly recognizable as the raw material of Ali and Nino and so many of the Caucasian books Lev would write."

==== Additional evidence for Lev Nussimbaum's authorship: plagiarism and repetition ====
Tamar Injia's book Ali and Nino – Literary Robbery! demonstrates that portions of Ali and Nino were "stolen" from the 1926 novel The Snake's Skin (Das Schlangenhemd) by Georgian author Grigol Robakidze. (It was published in Georgian in 1926 and in German in 1928. Injia analyzed the two books, found similar and identical passages, and concluded that "Kurban Said" (whom she identifies as Essad Bey) deliberately transferred passages from Robakidze's novel.

=== The case for Yusif Vazir Chamanzaminli's authorship ===
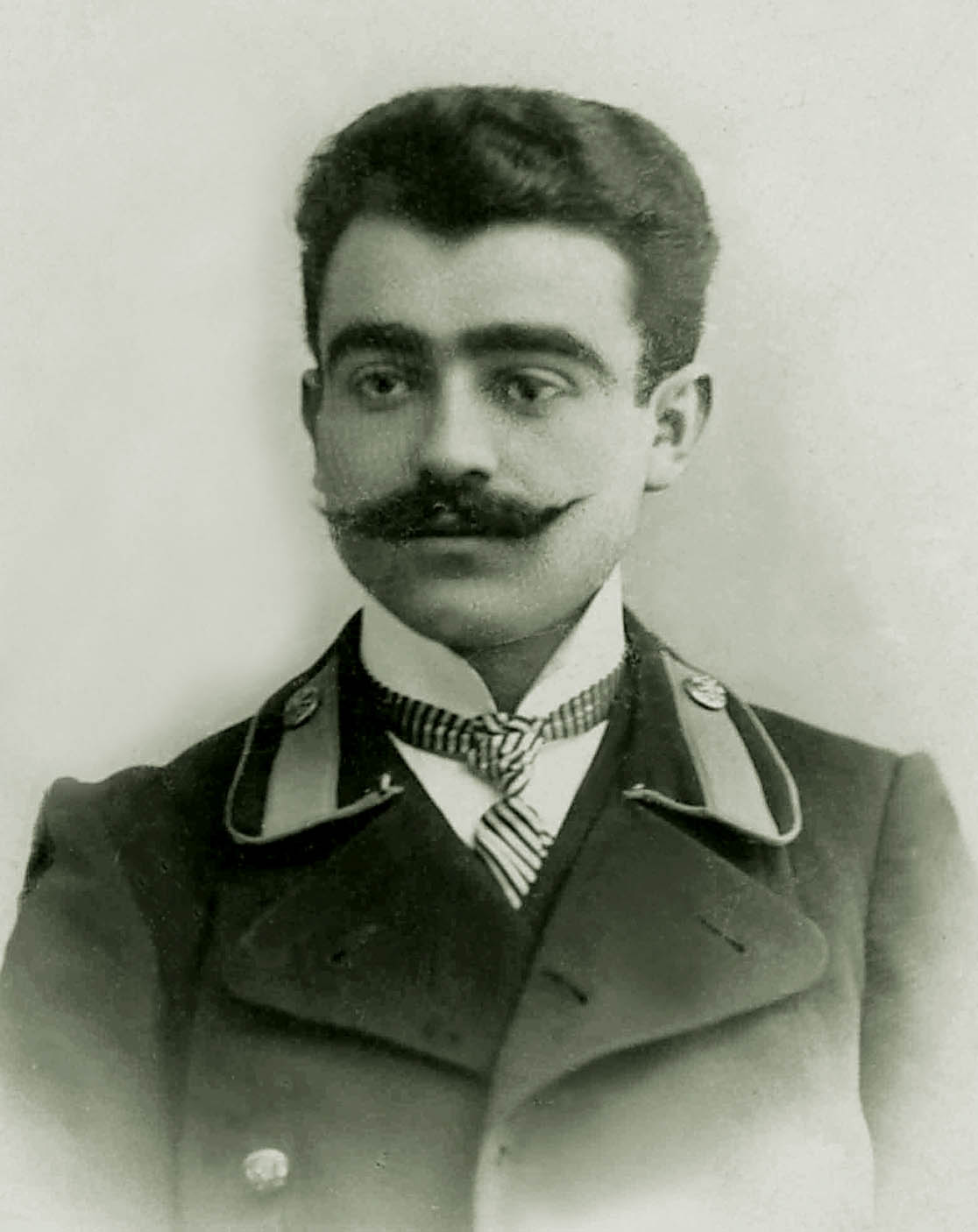
Yusif Vazir Chamanzaminli (Yusif Vəzir Cəmənzəminli in Azeri), Azerbaijani author, whom Betty Blair argues is the "Core Author" of Ali and Nino, using textual comparisons between the diaries, essays, short stories and novels of which he is the undisputed author and the novel Ali and Nino, the authorship of which is in dispute.

The claim that the Azerbaijani novelist Yusif Vazir, known popularly as Yusif Vazir Chamanzaminli, is the true author of Ali and Nino appears to have begun in the preface to the 1971 Turkish edition of the novel, in which the Turkish translator Semih Yazichioghlu, claimed that Lucy Tal, the late widow of the original publisher E.P. Tal, had written a letter stating that in the 1920s "a handsome young man" had "left a pile of manuscripts" that the company published in 1937. (Lucy Tal unequivocally denied having written the statement, calling the assertions "monstrous claims".)

Chamanzaminli's late sons Orkhan and Fikret have continued to make the claim. They began advocating for it at least by the 1990s after the first Azeri translation of Ali and Nino was published in 1990. An earlier Azeri translation had been made in 1972, but a complete rendering in Azeri, by Mirza Khazar, was published for the first time, serially, in three issues of the magazine Azerbaijan in 1990. Following this theory, Chamanzaminli has been listed as the author (rather than the standard "Kurban Said") in a number of editions, particularly in Azerbaijan where the has declared Chamanzaminli to be the author.

In the 2004 film Alias Kurban Said, directed by Jos de Putter, Yusif Vazirov Chamanzaminli's late son Fikrat Vazirov offered an argument for Chamanzaminli's authorship. Chamanzaminli had been in a romantic relationship with a girlfriend named Nina who, he argued, became "Nino" in the novel. "Anyone can say they are Kurban Said, but they can't tell you how they met Nino in Nikolay Street." He attested that his father had met a young woman named "Nino": "She was walking along Nikolay Street and father came from the Institute. They met here in the park, just like in the novel. He was nineteen and she was seventeen."

A short story by Chamanzaminli, published in 1927, autobiographical in appearance, featured a starving writer in Paris in the mid-1920s (when Chamanzaminli was there) who works as a ghostwriter producing articles under the signature of someone else and getting only 25 percent of the earnings for them. Blair offers this as a clue that Chamanzaminli had in reality, not in fiction, produced writings that appeared under others' signatures. Blair implicitly conjectures that the novel must have also passed out of his possession and that he thus lost the capacity to receive credit for its writing. Fikret Vezirov has proffered the claim that Chamanzaminli had to hide his identity behind the name Kurban Said so that he would not be identified with the anti-Bolshevik views contained in Ali and Nino. If Chamanzaminli had a copy of the manuscript, Vezirov said, it must have been among those Vezirov reports Chamanzaminli burning in 1937 when Chamanzaminli fell under the suspicion of the KGB. Vezirov referred to an article from the 1930s, the authors of which, in Vezirov's characterization, resented Nussimbaum's use of the name "Essad Bey" and protested "that he wrote pornography that had nothing to do with history, that he was just inciting nations against each other." Vezirov cited the fact that his father had traveled to Iran, Tbilisi, Kislovodsk, and Daghestan (all visited by the novel's characters) as another self-evident link. "Draw your own conclusions," he declared.

Panah Khalilov (alternative spelling: Penah Xelilov), as shown in the film Alias Kurban Said, is the creator of the Chamanzaminli archive. He referred in the film to a Chamanzaminli story published in 1907 which he believes is a "primary variant", rather than "the complete Ali and Nino." He also referred to "a book, written in German and published in Berlin" whose author had met Nussimbaum, had read Blood and Oil in the Orient, and "had written an essay about it in which he accuses him of insulting his people by saying that the core of the Azerbeidshan people were Jews" – a characterization that Cerkez Qurbanov, who translated Blood and Oil into Azeri, vociferously denied was true about Blood and Oil in the Orient.

Wendell Steavenson, in her 2002 book Stories I Stole: From Georgia reported that "Vazirov the younger called Lev Nussimbaum a fraudster, a 'charlatan', not a Bakuvian, who wrote twelve books 'of an adventurist nature' but had nothing to do with Ali and Nino. 'Ali and Nino', he declared 'is a pure Azerbaijani novel.' His father, he said, had written Ali and Nino and managed to get it published in Vienna through a cousin who lived there. There were too many details that matched: Kurban Said must have been an Azeri. 'He even knew all about a special kind of Shusha cheese, which only a man from Shusha would know about.' Vazirov argued."

==== Assertions that Azerbaijani nationalism motivates the advocacy of Yusif Vazir Chamanzaminli's authorship ====
At least four scholars of Azerbaijani literature and culture have expressed skepticism about Azerbaijan International's arguments for Chamanzaminli's authorship of Ali and Nino. They have offered two kinds of criticism: one is a political rejection of the latent exclusionary nationalism they feel has motivated the campaign for establishing Chamanzaminli as the novel's "core author". The other criticizes Azerbaijan International's interpretation of the book as having derived from Chamanzaminli himself.

The Azerbaijani novelist and literary critic Chingiz Huseynov (or Guseinov), who teaches at Moscow State University, cautioned in 2004 against being "driven by 'ethno-emotions' that may compel us to tie this piece to Azerbaijani literature at any cost." Renowned Azerbaijani poet, mathematician, and founder of Baku's Khazar University Hamlet Isakhanli oglu Isayev has also spoken out against nationalistic motivations in the campaign for Chamanzaminli's authorship. "I think that appealing to the Azerbaijanis' sense of national pride by trying to prove that Chamanzaminli wrote the novel is counterproductive. ... As an Azerbaijani I don't feel any more proud because an ethnic Azeri supposedly wrote the novel." Another commentator is Alison Mandaville, a professor of literature at California State University, Fresno who has translated fiction from Azerbaijani to English and has published extensively on Azerbaijani literature and culture. Alison Mandaville's articles on Azerbaijani literature and culture include "Mullahs to Donkeys: Cartooning in Azerbaijan." For Mandaville, Azerbaijan International's attempt to establish Chamanzaminli's authorship of Ali and Nino reflects a narrow sense of literature as a form of "property" that detracts from the appreciation and promotion of literature itself and reflects a contemporary sense of communalist Azeri nationalism that is divorced from the multicultural nationalism reflected in the novel. "This controversy reads like a view of literature as property – political, national property … as if the most important thing is not the literature itself, but who gets to 'own' it. In my opinion, Azerbaijan would be much better served by supporting and promoting literature itself, rather than getting into 'whose' it is. For anyone that reads today, literature is global. And anyone doing research on origins of literature during the Ali and Nino period knows that nation was a highly fluid thing at that point in history."

==== Betty Blair and Azerbaijan Internationals case for Yusif Vazir Chamanaminli's authorship ====
Research findings by Betty Blair and associated researchers were published in a special 2011 edition of Azerbaijan International magazine entitled Ali and Nino: The Business of Literature. (Some articles are co-credited to other authors in addition to Blair.) Blair points to numerous parallels between events from Chamanzaminli's life and writings and the text of Ali and Nino. She offers only a small handful of circumstantial events in Chamanzaminli's life on the basis of which she constructs a hypothetical scenario in which a manuscript by Chamanzaminli – the existence of which is conjectural – would somehow have been written by him, then would have been acquired by the Viennese publisher, E.P. Tal. Somehow Lev Nussimbaum would have been given this hypothetical manuscript and would have "embellished" it before its publication.

===== Blair's hypotheses on a Chamanzaminli manuscript =====
Betty Blair, in Azerbaijan International, has asserted that "there are too many links between Chamanzaminli and Ali and Nino to explain as being merely circumstantial. Irrefutable evidence points directly to Chamanzaminli as the core writer." However she has not shown any paper trail of documentary sources showing that Chamanzaminli had anything to do with Ali and Nino, nor demonstrated any link between any Chamanzaminli manuscript (either what she hypothetically refers to as "the core manuscript" or any other manuscript known to be authored by Chamanzaminli) and the publication of Ali and Nino. She links Chamanzaminli to Ali and Nino through textual parallels, relying on proposed textual parallels between Chamanzaminli's life and writings and the novel's content as "irrefutable evidence".

Blair attempts to offer outlines of the way in which a transmission from Chamanzamini to Tal and Nussimbaum might have taken place. She proposes two hypothetical scenarios. She bases these scenarios on reported and speculative actions and movements made by Chamanzaminli and some claims made about Lev Nussimbaum, as well as on statements that have been retracted or which Blair notes as unreliable, or which falls under the "fruit of the poisonous tree" doctrine because it was obtained under interrogation.

In her first hypothetical scenario, Blair asserts that Chamanzaminli's presence in Europe in the early- to mid-1920s makes his authorship theoretically possible. Chamanzaminli lived in Paris in the years 1923 to 1926. It is possible, Blair asserts, that he sold or left a manuscript in Europe, which Nussimbaum would have later altered to produce the present text. Chamanzaminli had reason to do so, she argues, because he had a need for income and because of the wisdom of not being in possession of any anti-Bolshevik writings upon his entry into the Soviet Union in 1926. She posits that Chamanzaminli "did stop in Berlin in 1926", citing a statement Chamanzaminli made under interrogation to a Soviet police agency and asserting, based on this source, that "we know for certain" that he visited Berlin. In 1926 however, Nussimbaum "would have just been starting his writing career with Die literarische Welt" and "we have no record that they ever met directly together." Blair provides no evidence that Chamanzaminli and Nussimbaum ever met at all or had any one-to-one connection.

Considering the Berlin connection too remote, Blair proposes a Vienna connection. There is no evidence that Chamanzaminli ever visited Vienna, but Blair's speculates that the writer "would have" traveled by train to Istanbul on his return to Baku in 1926 and "could have" gone to that city on his way, "to visit Tal at his publishing company." Blair implies hypothetically that a manuscript "would have" passed from Chamanzaminli's hands into Tal's possession at that moment. Blair purports that this stop in Vienna is possible because Chamanzaminli "would have" taken the Orient Express (which passed through Vienna) because it was "the most famous train route of its day."

Blair offers a further elaboration of this Vienna scenario based on a statement attributed to the original publisher's wife, Lucy Tal, which Tal vociferously denied ever making. Blair reports that the preface to the 1971 Turkish edition asserts that the author behind Kurban Said is Yusif Vazir Chamanzaminli. The translator, Semih Yazichioghlu, writes in this preface that two Azerbaijanis living in the United States – Mustafa Turkekul (who has said that he studied with Chamanzaminli in the 1930s) and Yusuf Gahraman (a former teacher and radiologist) read the book when the first English translation came out in 1970. The two "recognized" the novel's descriptions of "familiar streets, squares, mansions" of Baku as well as "the names of some of the Oil Baron families mentioned in the book." They then contacted Random House, the publisher, "hoping to learn more about the identity of Kurban Said." They assert in this foreword that Lucy Tal (the wife of E.P. Tal, the novel's original Viennese publisher) had replied: "It was in the 1920s (Mrs. Tal couldn't remember exactly what year it was). A handsome young man came to the publishing house and spoke with my husband [E.P. Tal] at length and then left a pile of manuscripts. I still don't know what they talked about as my husband never told me... My husband went on to publish these manuscripts in 1937." Andreas Tietze translated this preface from Turkish into English on May 31, 1973, for Tal's lawyer F.A.G. Schoenberg on May 31, 1973. Tietze, perhaps the first to give credence to the Chamanzaminli theory, commented that "the evidence, although not conclusive, does have a certain weight, and perhaps Chamanzaminli is really identical with Kurban Said." Yet within days of hearing of the quote attributed to her, Lucy Tal unequivocally denied having written the statement. In a letter to Schoenberg on June 2, 1973, Tal wrote: "Having read that document, I am quite startled. Never did I write such a letter to any Turks or anybody else. Why and what for? And it would have been so entirely unlike me. Such monstrous claims, how can one disprove them???" Tal und Co. published at least 15 books in Vienna in 1937 in addition to Ali und Nino.

Blair's second hypothetical scenario involves a transmission in Istanbul, Turkey rather than Berlin, Germany or Vienna, Austria. Blair cites a claim by Giamil Ahmad Vacca-Mazzara, an associate of Lev Nussimbaum's in his final years in Positano, Italy that "Essad Bey" (Vacca-Mazzara denied that this name was a pseudonym for Lev Nussimbaum) wrote Ali and Nino in Istanbul based on Vacca-Mazzara's own story, and that Vacca-Mazzara was himself "Kurban Said", which he claims was Nussimbaum's nickname for him. Blair notes that Vacca-Mazzara "cannot be relied upon as a credible witness," but nonetheless hopes that "there may be some hints of truth to some parts of his story." Blair asserts that a passage in Chamanzaminli's writing represents "a paper trail" demonstrating that Chamanzamanli "spent considerable time in three libraries in old Istanbul while living there (1920–1923) after his appointment as Azerbaijan's ambassador was terminated with the takeover of Bolshevik government in Baku." Beyond Chamanzamanli's mere presence in Istanbul, moreover, "he even wrote that he had left some of his works in those libraries." Blair's "paper trail" consists of the following statement from Chamanzaminli's writings: "We gave some documents to the Qatanov [Katanov] Library of Suleymaniye in Istanbul. They are related to the last period of Azerbaijan's Independence, a two-year collection of the newspaper Azerbaijan in Russian, The News of Azerbaijan Republic Government, along with magazines and books about our national economy, and documents describing Armenian-Muslim conflict in Caucasia." The quote does not state that the donations in question were authored by Chamanzaminli, nor that they included fiction or any unpublished writings.

Blair offers the two hypothetical scenarios, rather than a documentary paper trail, as a theory of how something conjecturally written by Chamanzaminli would have been published in an altered form as Ali and Nino in 1937. Lacking any evidence of a material connection, Blair offers instead an accumulation of parallels.

===== Parallels Blair draws between Chamanzaminli and Ali and Nino =====
Referring to parallels between passages in Chamanzaminli's writings and evidence from his life events, Blair asserts that Chamanzaminli is the "core author" of the novel Ali and Nino. Blair's "core author" argument is based on a list of 101 correlations found by comparing aspects of Chamanzaminli's and writings as well as evidence about his life experiences and his works including his diaries, articles, short stories and novels.

Blair asserts that in the writings that Nussimbaum published as Essad Bey, he shows himself to have a negative attitude toward Azerbaijan, that when he left he was "thrilled to have closed that chapter of his life." He is "seemingly untouched emotionally" by Azerbaijan's loss of independence. In contrast, Ali and Nino portrays the country's conquest by the USSR in 1920 as an agonizing tragedy. Blair writes:

Compare the two final scenes. The final paragraphs in Essad Bey's work Blood and Oil in the Orient describe him and his father stepping off the steamship and heading to the center of Constantinople [now Istanbul] to the international Grand Hotel. The narrator is impressed with the European-style posters advertising French entertainment: "The biggest Revue in the world at the Petits Chants today." Father and son decide to buy a French newspaper. And at that moment, Essad Bey confesses – almost in triumph: "At that moment Europe began for me. The old East was dead." The end. But the final scene in Ali and Nino takes us to the northern city of Ganja (Azerbaijan) where Ali Khan has taken up arms to fight against the advancing Bolsheviks. Historically, the Bolsheviks would go on to hijack the Azerbaijani government, on April 28, 1920. The situation is not fiction.

However, in a scene reminiscent of that same Blood and Oil in the Orient quotation, in chapter 22 of Ali and Nino, Ali tells his father, "Asia is dead..." To which Ali's father replies, "Asia is not dead. Its borders only have changed, changed forever. Baku is now Europe. And that is not just a coincidence. There were no Asiatics left in Baku any longer." The working title of Ali and Nino, according to the 1937 contract between Baroness Elfriede Ehrenfels von Bodmerschof and the Tal publishing company, was The Dying Orient.

Blair relies on an accumulation of evidence employed to suggest that Lev Nussimbaum, who wrote as Essad Bey, could not have written Ali and Nino by himself. She acknowledges that Nussimbaum left "fingerprints" on the book, but asserts that his contribution is limited to folkloric and legendary material, some of which he copied from his earlier books, which she shows is often neither culturally or ethnically reliable. (Much of this echoes Tom Reiss's account of Nussimbaum's writing.) Blair asserts that Nussimbaum could not have acquired the knowledge of Azerbaijan evident in Ali and Nino during his time in Baku, which ended when he was 14 years old, and during which time he had limited contact with Azerbaijani life. Therefore, in her view, he could not have written significant portions of the novel. She claims that Nussimbaum did not sympathize with the Azerbaijani national cause embodied in the novel and that he wrote his books, she judges, too quickly to have written them by himself. Therefore, she hypothesizes, he must have "gained access to the" (hypothetical) "original manuscripts" and "embellished them." She posits that the novel has a self-contradictory quality that can be explained through the hypothesis that it was based on something Chamanzaminli wrote but that it had been altered by Nussimbaum.

===== Criticisms of Blair's argumentation =====
Azerbaijani journalist Nikki Kazimova has reported that "most of the evidence of Chemenzeminli's authorship is suggestive rather than factual, and plenty of AI's arguments are a 'proof by contradiction.'"

Some scholars of Azerbaijani literature and culture, after being exposed to Blair's arguments, continue to express doubts about the possibility that Chamanzaminli is the novel's author. Hamlet Isakhanli oglu Isayev, who chaired a December 2010 meeting in which Blair presented her findings, remarked that the findings "left many questions unanswered." Others have offered more specific criticisms. Leah Feldman, the 2010 recipient of the Heydar Aliyev award for scholarship on Azerbaijan, presented by the Consulate General of Azerbaijan and a research associate at Princeton University's Princeton Institute for International and Regional Studies, who studies Orientalism and Azerbaijani literature, attended one of Blair's presentations at the Writers' Union in Baku in December 2010. Feldman has characterized Betty Blair's approach as based on a "theory of authorship as autobiography," explaining that "Blair's argument indicates that what she calls the 'core author' of Ali and Nino is not the man who penned the text (Essad Bey/Lev Nussimbaum) but rather the individual whose life and ideas are most readily expressed by the protagonists." Feldman's assessment of the novel leans toward Nussimbaum as author. "To me," she has written, "the novel read as an Orientalist piece." As an "Orientalist" novel, it would represent a primarily European point of view regarding Azerbaijan. Mandaville's assessment of Ali and Nino also favors Nussimbaum's authorship. Referring to the fact that Nussimbaum was of the Azerbaijani Jewish minority while Chamanzaminli was part of the Muslim majority, Mandaville writes that "the most interesting thing about the novel is the intense love/hate super-nostalgic relationship expressed for the region – exactly the kind of thing a person who was a (minority) child in an area they are now exiled from would write."

=== The case for Baron and Baroness Ehrenfels's authorship ===
Austrian Baroness Elfriede Ehrenfels (1894–1982) registered the novel Ali and Nino with German authorities, and her niece Leela Ehrenfels (in association with the Baron Omar Rolf von Ehrenfel's second wife, the Baroness Mireille Ehrenfels-Abeille) has claimed that the pseudonym Kurban Said belonged to her aunt Elfriede, and that she wrote both Kurban Said novels, Ali and Nino and The Girl from the Golden Horn. No one has offered any robust contextual comparison between Ali and Nino and other known writings by Elfriede Ehrenfels, but Leela Ehrenfels has noted several coincidences between her aunt's and father's lives and writings that suggest their, or at least Elfriede's, authorship of the novel. One is that the April 20, 1937, working title of the novel was The Dying Orient, and her father and aunt (the Baron and Baroness Ehrenfels) had previously written an article together entitled "The Dying Istanbul". Another is that the Ehrenfels made a film entitled The Great Longing, which is "about a man who is disappointed with the world. And he is looking for true love or truth." (The unspoken implication may be that this is similar to Ali and Nino.) Third, Baron Omar Rolf von Ehrenfels set up the "Orient Bund" for Muslim students in Berlin "in order to bring Europeans and Muslims closer together." Leela Ehrenfels and Mireille Ehrenfels-Abeille have also said it is possible that Elfriede had an affair with Lev Nussimbaum. Fourth, according to the April 20, 1937, contract with E.P. Tal & Co., Baroness Elfriede was the author behind the pseudonym Kurban Said, and Leela has said, "that makes it obvious to me that she wrote both books. But it is possible that Essad Bey supplied some of the material. And that there are certain parts on which they worked together." Fifth, Leela Ehrenfels cites a September 14, 1938, letter from "Essad Bey" to Baroness Ehrenfels, written in Positano, Italy, in which he again refers to her as "Mrs. Kurban Said" and congratulates her on something unmentioned – Leela Ehrenfels interprets this as a reference to The Girl From the Golden Horn.

In the 2004 film Alias Kurban Said, the Baroness Mireille Ehrenfels-Abeille said that Elfriede Ehrenfels "never" said "a single word" regarding Ali and Nino when she knew her after returning to Austria in 1960 from a long stay in India, explaining that "it was a different world, that had come to an end." In a 1999 interview with Tom Reiss, however, Baroness Ehrenfels-Abeille recounted that, in Reiss's description, "sometime in the early 1970s the baroness remembers getting the first inkling that Elfriede had once been Kurban Said." Baron Omar-Rolf Ehrenfels's sister Imma informed Baroness Mireille Ehrenfels-Abeille that she had, the baroness told Reiss, "received a funny letter, some doctor wanted to know if I'd written a book call[ed] Ali and Nino." Mireille asked Elfriede about it, and Elfriede said, "Naturally, Immi does not need to know everything. Yes, I produced it." The word "produced" is left ambiguous.
