= Blood and Oil in the Orient =

1929 book by Lev Nussimbaum

Blood and Oil in the Orient was the first book written by Essad Bey, penname for Lev Nussimbaum (1905–42). The book was first published in 1929 when Essad Bey was only 24 years old. During the following eight years (1929–36), 16 books were published under his name.

Blood and Oil in the Orient, which Essad Bey claimed was an autobiography, concerns the political history of Azerbaijan in the early 20th century. It includes the escape of Lev and his father from Baku across the Caspian Sea to Turkestan and Iran during 1918 when massacres were taking place in Baku. It concludes with father and son fleeing the Bolshevik takeover of Baku in 1920 via Tiflis and Batumi, Georgia, across the Black Sea to Istanbul. Lev Nussimbaum was only 14 years old when he fled Azerbaijan.

Prominent Azerbaijani and Georgian historians discredit the book from historical, geographical and ethnographical points of view, and thus they insist that, despite Essad Bey's claims, it cannot be relied upon as autobiographical.

Initial reviews from the Caucasian emigres, who had fled the Bolsheviks and settled in Germany, were caustic. For example, G. Yashke wrote: "The only real aim of this book is to make money by creating a work - the product of a spiteful fantasy - that will delight undiscerning readers who seek sensationalism. The book spreads lies and slander about various nations, distorts historical events in a dishonest way, spreads miserable propaganda that assists the enemies of Azerbaijan and the Caucasus, and falsifies the descriptions of events relating to the recent past." The Germans were so livid about Essad Bey's claims about their activities in Baku that they carried out an investigation into his background in 1930.

Critiques in English by those who knew the region well were also devastating. One critic concluded: "One might, however, write a good-sized book to point out the improbabilities and misunderstandings to which the author has given currency.... But the present reviewer would not willingly waste any more ink or paper in rescuing such a story from deserved oblivion."

== Plot synopsis ==
The book opens with a short description about how the author's parents had met at Bayil Prison in the suburbs of Baku. Essad Bey's father was described as a young Azerbaijani oil entrepreneur and his mother, an imprisoned Bolshevik revolutionary. As the story goes, Essad Bey's father just happened to be strolling along in the shade of the prison on a hot sunny afternoon when he chanced upon a woman looking out from between the bars of the prison.

At first sight, he determined to take her home to be his wife. After threatening and bribing the guards, he achieved her release and took her home that very day after dismissing his harem. However the marriage certificate for Lev Nussimbaum's parents has been found in Tbilisi, Georgia. The couple Abram Leybusovich Nusimbaum (citizen of Tiflis) and Basya Davidovna Slutzkin (from Belarus) were married on October 26, 1904, in the Tiflis Synagogue. And thus, began the first of many sensational tales that may make for "good reading" but which absolutely are not true, that Essad Bey would write during his literary career which spanned slightly more than a decade from about 1926 to 1937.
