= Azerbaijan International =

- Editor: Betty Blair
- Categories: Culture
- Frequency: Quarterly
- Total circulation: 7,000
- Founded: 1993
- Country: United States; Azerbaijan
- Language: English, Azeri
- Website: AZER.com
- ISSN: 1075-086X

Azerbaijan International is a magazine that discusses issues related to Azerbaijanis around the world. It was established in 1993 shortly after the dissolution of the Soviet Union when Azerbaijan gained its independence. Since then, it has been published quarterly in English with occasional articles in the Azerbaijani language in Latin and Arabic scripts. The magazine has offices in Los Angeles and Baku.

Each issue includes about 100-colored pages and relates to a specific theme. Past themes have included art, music, literature, folklore, architecture, archeology, health, the environment, international relations, business, trends, and transitions. Its target audience is international readers in the business, diplomatic, and academic communities. The magazine is funded via advertisements from major companies which do business in Azerbaijan.

== Special editions ==
Several editions have been particularly noteworthy in the history of the magazine. These include research about the discovery and decipherment of the Caucasian Albanian (Old Udi alphabet) in Mount Sinai, Egypt, by Dr. Zaza Aleksidze, Folklore of the Sufi Hamid Cemetery, and the relationship of Maiden Tower to the Winter Solstice. Also the 2006 Tangaroa Pacific Voyage: "Testing Thor Heyerdahl's Theories about Kon-Tiki 60 Years Later."

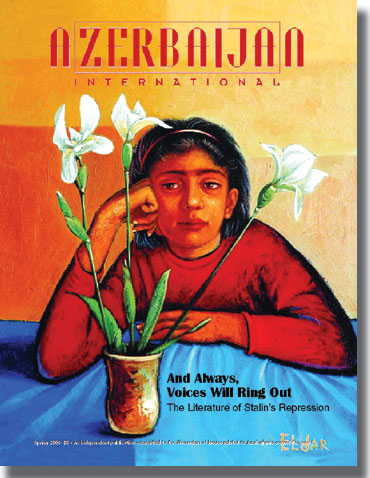
Vol. 14, No. 1 of the magazine focused on "Literature of Stalinist Repressions," 2006

Six issues were dedicated to Azerbaijani literature; specifically, the Spring issues of 1996, 1999, 2004, 2005, and 2011, and 2013. The literature of Stalinist repressions in Azerbaijan had never been published in English before and is even difficult to find in the Azerbaijani language.

The Winter 1994 edition featured artwork by Azerbaijani painter Gayyur Yunus on the back cover.

=== Ali and Nino research ===
The recent triple edition of the 2011 edition of the magazine (Vol. 15:2-4, 364 pages available in English and in Azerbaijani) deals with the mystery surrounding the identity of the author of the novel Ali and Nino: A Love Story which appeared under the pseudonym Kurban Said, first published in 1937 in German by the Austrian publishing house E.P. Tal. The issue is entitled "Who Wrote Azerbaijan's Most Famous Novel: Ali and Nino? The Business of Literature."

According to Betty Blair, editor of AI and author of the articles, research was carried out over a period of six years (2004–2010) examining documents and materials in 10 languages (Azerbaijani, Russian, English German, French, Italian, Turkish, Georgian, Persian and Swedish). The magazine staff also relied on archival materials in the Azerbaijan Republic State History Archives, Institute of Manuscripts (Baku), Georgian Centre for Manuscripts (Tbilisi), Ukrainian National Archives (Kyiv), ZMO (Center for Modern Oriental Studies, Berlin) and the rare library resources of German, Italian and French journals from the 1930s that are available at University of California, Los Angeles (UCLA) and Getty Museum, Los Angeles.

In the articles, Betty Blair concludes that (1) Azerbaijani writer Yusif Vazir Chamanzaminli (1887-1943) is the core author of Ali and Nino as his personal life and works mirror the storyline and issues in the novel. (2) Lev Nussimbaum (Essad Bey) (1905-1942) served primarily as a broker and enhanced passages—especially related to folklore and legendary topics. (3) Essad Bey plagiarized passages from Georgian writer Grigol Robakidze (1881-1962), especially related to travels in Tiflis (Tbilisi) and Iran. (4) Austrian Baroness Elfriede Ehrenfels (1894-1982) registered the pseudonym “Kurban Said” in her own name.
