= Kurban Said =

Pseudonymous author of 'Ali and Nino'

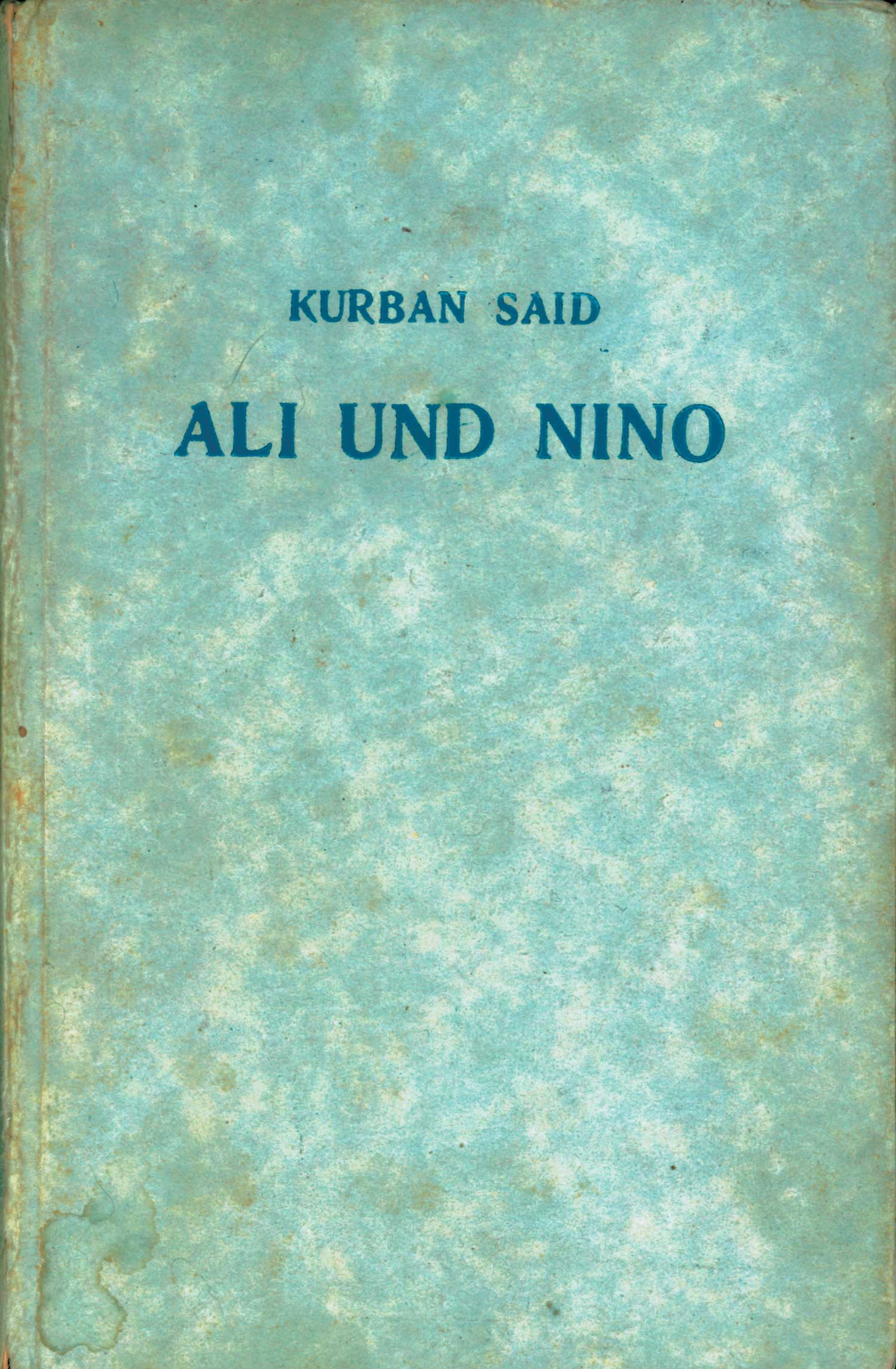
Ali und Nino, first edition in the German language, published by E.P. Tal, Vienna, 1937

Kurban Said (Azerbaijani: Qurban Səid/Гурбан Сәид, IPA: [ɡuɾˈbɑn sæˈit]) is the pseudonym of the author of Ali and Nino, a novel originally published in 1937 in the German language by the Austrian publisher E.P. Tal. The novel has since been published in more than 30 languages. The true identity of the author is in dispute.

== Meaning of the pseudonym "Kurban Said" ==
In Azerbaijan, where the novel "Ali and Nino" is set, "Kurban" is pronounced "Gurban." The root of the word originates in the Semitic languages, and connotes "sacrifice", a traditional religious concept common to Middle Eastern cultures. "Said" means "joyful" or "fortunate". (However, in Turkic languages, such as Azerbaijani, adjectives precede the nouns they modify, so the name would need to be reversed as "Said Kurban" to accurately convey the meaning "joyful sacrifice", or "fortunate sacrifice".) This idea is in contrast to the plot of the novel, which is anything but happy. An underlying melancholy pervades the novel from beginning to end.

Some people, including Orkhan Vazirov (1928–2010), the son of Yusif Vazir Chamanzaminli (possibly the author of Ali and Nino), are convinced that the original pseudonym is more likely to have been "Kurban Seyid" or perhaps "Seyid Kurban." "Seyid" refers to someone who is recognized as a descendant of Mohammed, that is, a person of sacred lineage. Thus "Seyid Kurban" would more accurately convey the meaning "someone of sacred descent who has been sacrificed", which is exactly the theme of the novel Ali and Nino. Ali Khan, the protagonist, sacrifices himself for the dream for himself and his country to be free. He dies while resisting the Bolshevik takeover of his country (1920). Note that in the Azerbaijani language, both "Gurban" and "Seyid" can be used as either first or last names.

== Chamanzaminli's links to the pseudonym "Kurban Said" ==
Yusif Vazir Chamanzaminli was a "seyid" himself, allegedly having been descended from Mohammed on both sides of his family. As for the name "Gurban," Chamanzaminli had written a short story titled "Gurban."

In addition, he had referred to himself as gurban in correspondence with Azerbaijani Soviet authorities in 1925 when he was seeking permission to return home from Europe after having been on a diplomatic assignment abroad representing the Azerbaijan Democratic Republic (ADR) government, which was in opposition to the Bolsheviks. Chamanzaminli realized that historic circumstances made him a likely victim of politics, as most ADR government officials had been killed when the Bolsheviks came to power. Chamanzaminli would have had to have left the manuscript of Ali and Nino in Europe at this time, 1925–1926, as it was critical of the Bolshevik regime. It would have been suicidal to return to Baku with the manuscript in hand, as the Bolsheviks had executed most of the government officials of the former regime and any opposition.

As it was, a decade later, the Azerbaijan Writers Union in 1937 were under orders from Stalin to purge anyone from their ranks who did not embrace the Soviet ideology. Yusif Vazir Chamanzaminli was accused of introducing "counter-revolutionary" ideas through the anti-heroes of his novels, and soon afterwards, he was arrested and sentenced to the GULag, where he died in 1943.

Chamanzaminli used the pseudonym "Ali Khan Chamanzaminli" in some of his earliest works, published in 1911. Ali Khan is also the name of the main character in the novel Ali and Nino.

== Lev Nussimbaum and the pseudonym "Kurban Said" ==
Lev Nussimbaum, who wrote in German under the pen name of Essad Bey, is also linked to the pseudonym "Kurban Said," and by some observers to the novel Ali and Nino.

When Lev Nussimbaum, still in his early 30s, began confronting the possibility of his own death from Buerger's Disease, he set out to write his autobiography, titling it The Man who Knew Nothing about Love (Der Mann, der von der Liebe nichts verstand). He signed it "Kurban Said." Although never published, Der Mann was advertised in 1937 as if it had been published and was available for purchase. This was the same year in which Ali and Nino appeared.

Tom Reiss, author of The Orientalist, concludes that since 'The Man Who Knew Nothing about Love" was the work of Lev Nussimbaum, then he was also the author of Ali and Nino. "Years of collecting every shred of evidence I could of his existence revealed that ... Lev's simplest statements about himself—name, race, nationality—are the ones that can least be trusted." It is possible that Nussimbaum was, in signing "Der Mann" as Kurban Said, appropriating a nom de plume already in use.

Azerbaijan International maintains that Essad Bey had his fingers in the "Ali and Nino" narrative, particularly in descriptive folkloric and legendary passages which often contained erroneous material but that the original manuscript of "Ali and Nino" did not originate with him but with the Azerbaijani writer Yusif Vazir Chamanzaminli (1887–1942). At issue is whether Lev Nussimbaum was within his rights to use the pseudonym, and whether the name actually originated with him.

The problem with the "Der Mann" narrative is that though it started out as a semi-autobiographical account, it quickly lapsed into a tale of vengeance within a fictional framework about a "Dr. X."

Dr. Wilfried Fuhrmann in Germany has transcribed and published all six of the hand-written German "Der Mann" Notebooks. He concludes that Notebooks 3 and 6 are the most damaging to Essad Bey's reputation. "To varying degrees, they are a mixture of malice and slander, as well as pathological hubris and arrogance."

For example, Essad Bey suggests that any woman who commits adultery should be tied up in a sack with a wild cat and thrown into the Bosphorus, or buried up to her head in the desert sands to be devoured at night by wild dogs. At the time, Nussimbaum was going through a scandalous divorce with his own wife Erika Loewendahl. However, the content and spirit of "Ali and Nino" which was published at the same time as Der Mann was advertised as being published (1937) is entirely the opposite, and Ali Khan truly was in love with Nino and did everything within his capability to foster her development and well-being. In truth, the two narratives are so unlike each other that it is impossible to imagine them being written by the same person.

Essad Bey signed his Final Will as "Essad Bey also known as Leo Nussimbaum and Lev Nussenbaum". No mention whatsoever is made of "Kurban Said". Essad Bey signed this Will (July 27, 1941) about a year before he died (August 27, 1942) and four years after Ali and Nino (1937) had been published.

== Vacca's claims to the pseudonym "Kurban Said" ==
Bello Vacca, an Italian born in Tripoli, who often went by the alias Ahmed Giamil Vacca-Mazzara also laid claim to the pseudonym Kurban Said. During the early 1970s, he appeared on the doorstep of Baron Omar Rolf Ehrenfels, husband of Elfriede Ehrenfels, who had registered "Ali and Nino" with German authorities. Vacca introduced himself: "Kurban Said, C'est moi!" ("Kurban Said, It's me!"). The Ehrenfels were astonished.

Vacca also wrote British publisher Hutchinson in 1975 claiming that he, as Kurban Said, had collaborated on several books with Essad Bey and they had had plans to publish them together – "Kurban Said" and "Essad Bey". Vacca named two titles: "Jihad" (Sacred Way) and "Kaloglan: From Samarkand to Tangiers."

Vacca was a friend of Essad Bey as well as his drug dealer and he was expelled from Egypt in 1938 on charges of drug dealing and arms smuggling. Vacca also is the person who arranged and financed the Muslim-style gravestone capped with a stone-carved turban for Essad Bey, who is buried in the sea coast town of Positano, Italy.

In 1944 – two years after Essad Bey's death – it was Vacca who arranged for the translation of "Ali and Nino" into Italian for the first time. However, although he had already identified the title as "Ali and Nino" in the obituary tribute that he had written for Essad Bey in 1942; in the 1944 edition of the novel, Vacca changed the title to "Ali Khan" and identified the author as "M. Essad Bey," instead of "Kurban Said." After all, he himself claimed to be Kurban Said. Vacca introduced further changes in the Ali Khan novel, most prominently, the name of Ali's true love "Nino Kipiani" and whose name had been part of the original title of the novel ("Ali and Nino") became "Erica Kipiani", based upon the name of Lev Nussimbaum's estranged wife, Erika Loewendahl, who had left him in 1937 to marry Rene Fulop-Miller.

Vacca tried to make the case that he himself was related to Essad Bey, four generations back – the implication being that Vacca himself was "sole survivor" and, thus, in line to inherit Essad Bey's wealth.

The motivation became evident in correspondence from Vacca to Omar Rolf Ehrenfels asking his advice in regard to approaching Hutchinson Publishers (London) who he said had not paid Essad Bey for the biography of Reza Shah. Vacca sought to claim the money and told Ehrenfels that he had his papers all in order as proof of the kinship relationship.

== Vacca's explanation of the meaning of name "Kurban Said" ==
Vacca claimed that the creation of the name "Kurban Said" was totally accidental—the result of a misunderstanding—which later became a private joke between him and Essad Bey. According to Vacca, the incident took place in Turkey during the festival of kurban Bayrami, the religious Muslim Festival of Sacrifice (Eid), which is commemorated annually to acknowledge God's mercy in providing Abraham with a ram as a substitute sacrifice for his son Ismayil.

Vacca described the scenario as follows: 1936. A lecture hall in the National Library of Istanbul (Old City). He and Essad Bey had set aside four days to work together on "Ali and Nino." Essad Bey was conversing with someone when Vacca arrived. "I addressed them both with the greeting, "Kurban Said," which Vacca explained, means "Happy Kurban Holiday."

Vacca continued: It turned out that it was a foreigner—a tourist—who had been talking with Essad Bey. He misunderstood the custom and thought I was introducing myself as "Kurban Said." And so the foreigner had smiled and replied: "Nice to meet you, Mr. Kurban Said." "Ever since then, Essad Bey jokingly called me 'Kurban Said,' and when he was looking for a pseudonym for the novel, he asked me if he could use it and I agreed."

=== Objections ===
Others, however, have objected to Vacca's claims. For example, Azerbaijan International shows that from a cultural point of view, Vacca's claims do not stand up to scrutiny. There is no greeting, "Kuban Said" or "Gurban Said," in any of the countries which celebrate this holiday – not in Turkey, Azerbaijan, Iran, or other Turkic-speaking or Islamic countries in Central Asia, or Arabic-speaking countries. And since this holiday Gurban Bayrami was and still is the biggest holiday in Turkey, all libraries would have been closed. Furthermore, other than Vacca's account, there is no proof that Essad Bey had even gone to Istanbul to work on the novel. Nor is there any other witness claiming that Vacca had been involved at all with editing "Ali and Nino."

== Das Mädchen vom Goldenen Horn ==
In 1938, a second novel, Das Mädchen vom Goldenen Horn, was published under the pseudonym Kurban Said.
