= Alliance Palace =

Skyscraper in Batumi, Georgia

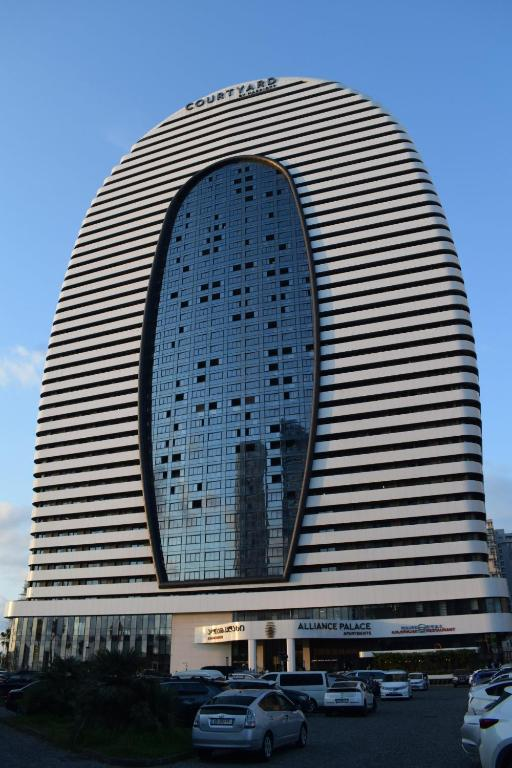

General information
- Type: Hotel
- Location: 5 Sherif Khimshiashvili St., Batumi, Georgia
- Coordinates: 41.64147°N 41.61602°E
- Construction started: 2015
- Completed: 2019
- Cost: $65 million
- Owner: Courtyard by Marriott
- Operator: Aimbridge Hospitality

Height
- Roof: 132 m (433 ft)

Technical details
- Floor count: 41 (+4 underground)

Design and construction
- Architect: Alliance Engineering
- Developer: Alliance Group

Website
- Official website

The Alliance Palace is a skyscraper hotel in the Pivzavod district of Batumi, Georgia. Built between 2015 and 2019, the tower stands at 132 m (433 ft) tall with 41 floors and is the current 9th tallest building in Georgia.

== History ==
The tower was the first investment of the Alliance Group's skyscraper project from the Batumi Beach, with total costs rising to $65 million. The apartment hotel building is managed by the American company Aimbridge Hospitality and owned by the Courtyard by Marriott brand.

The proper construction of the building was completed in the second half of 2021, with the inauguration of part of the complex being postponed for January 2022 as a test mode due to inactive tourist flows. 150 rooms of the Courtyard By Marriott hotel are located between floors one and five, with the rest of the structural division housing premium class apartments.

== See also ==
- List of tallest buildings in Georgia (country)

== Gallery ==
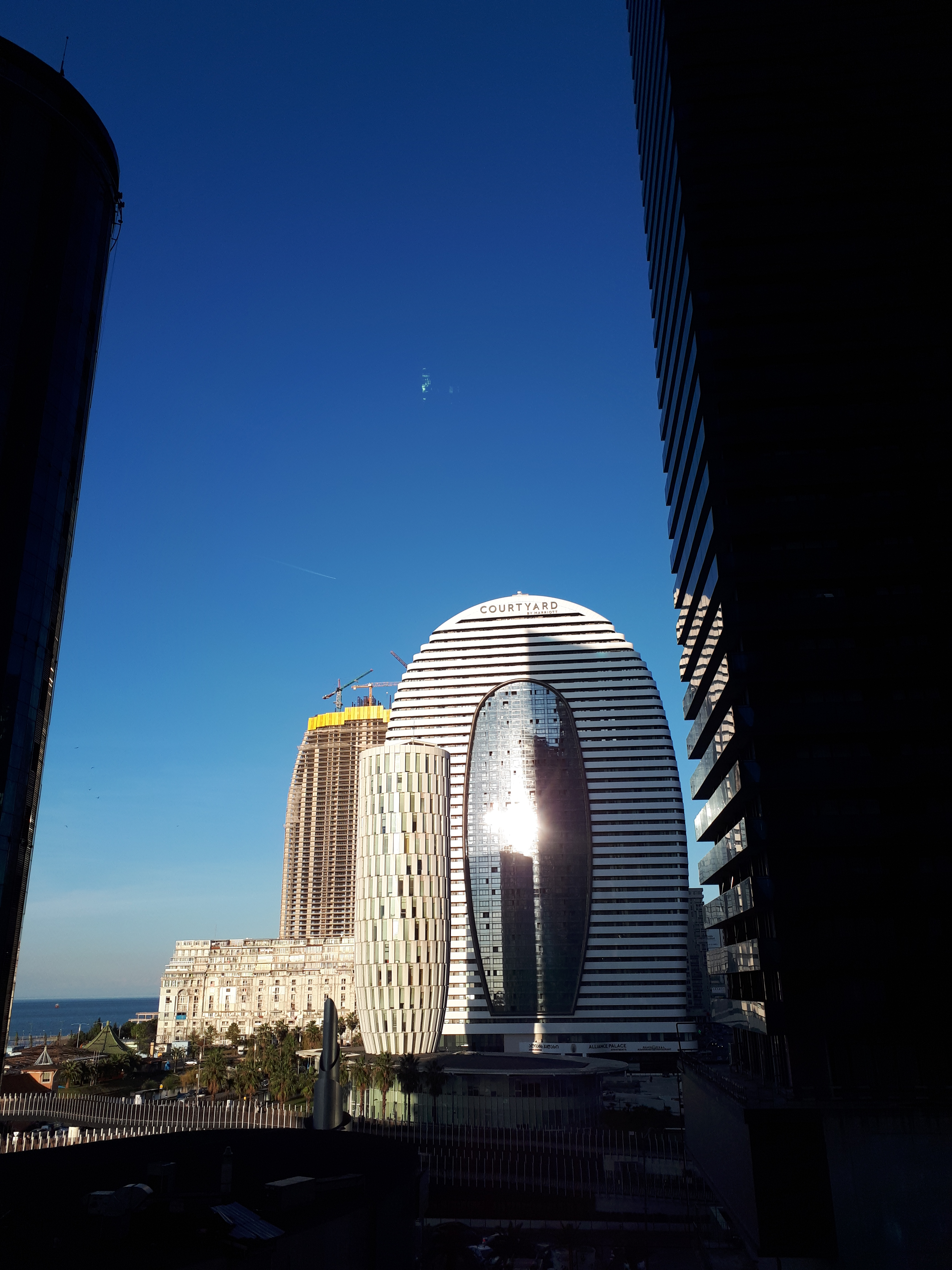
The tower in 2024 with the Alliance Centropolis Tower C in the background
