= Ali and Nino (sculpture) =

Public art installation by Tamara Kvesitadze

Coordinates: 41°39′20″N 41°38′35″E

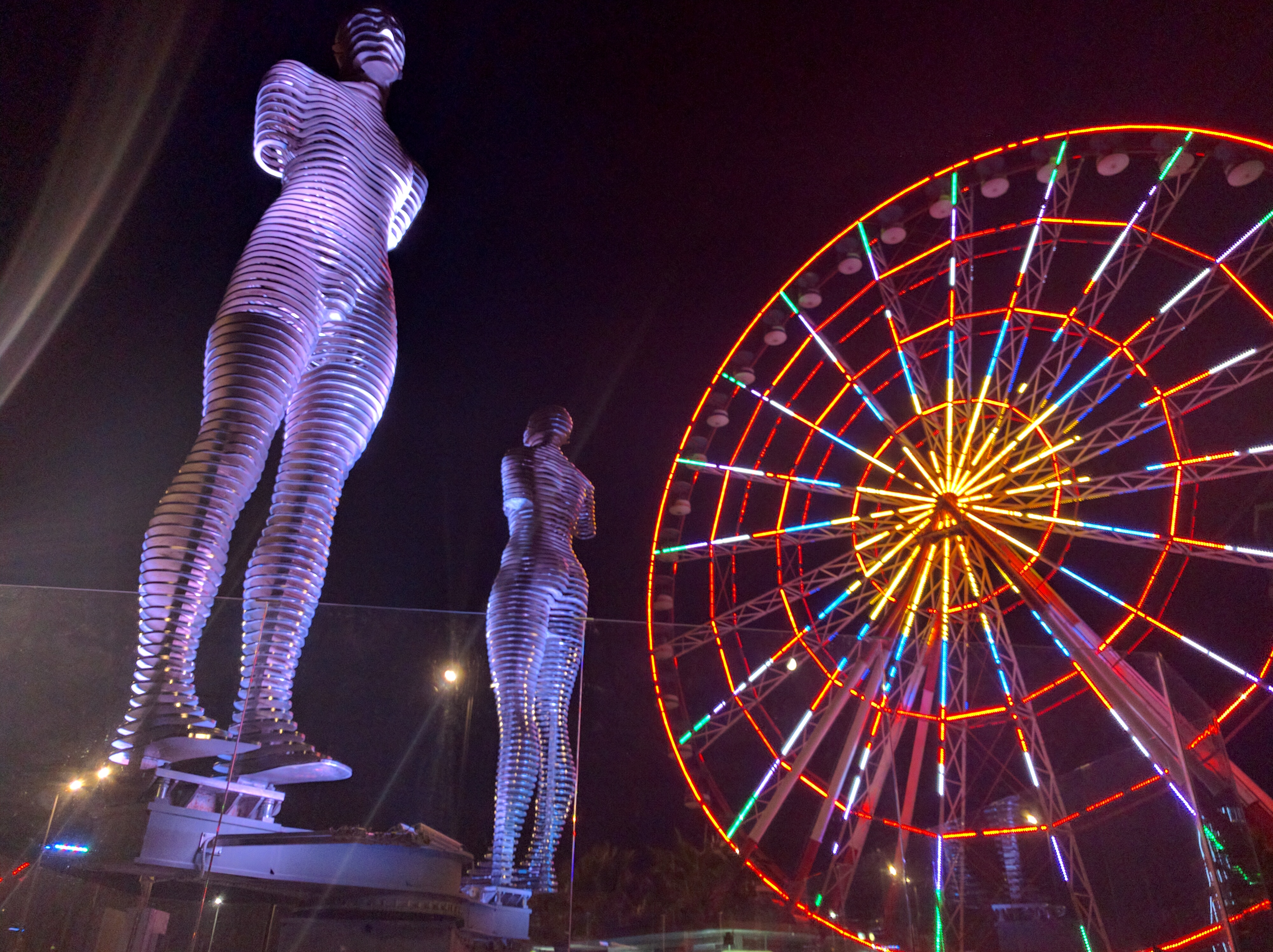
- Artist: Tamara Kvesitadze
- Year: 2010
- Subject: The title characters of Ali and Nino
- Dimensions: 8 m (310 in)
- Location: Batumi, Goergia
- Website: https://visitbatumi.com/en/monuments-951/ali-and-nino-statue

Ali and Nino, previously named Man and Woman, is a kinetic sculpture and public art installation by Tamara Kvesitadze. It was designed in 2007 and then installed at the shore of Batumi, Georgia in 2010. The sculpture represents eternal love and mutual understanding across cultures and religions.

The statue has become an important symbol of Batumi, although the original story does not take place in the city itself.

== Inspiration ==
The statue was inspired by the 1937 novel Ali and Nino, about a muslim Azerbaijani boy and a Christian Georgian girl who fall in love during World War I. Their love story is ultimately doomed.

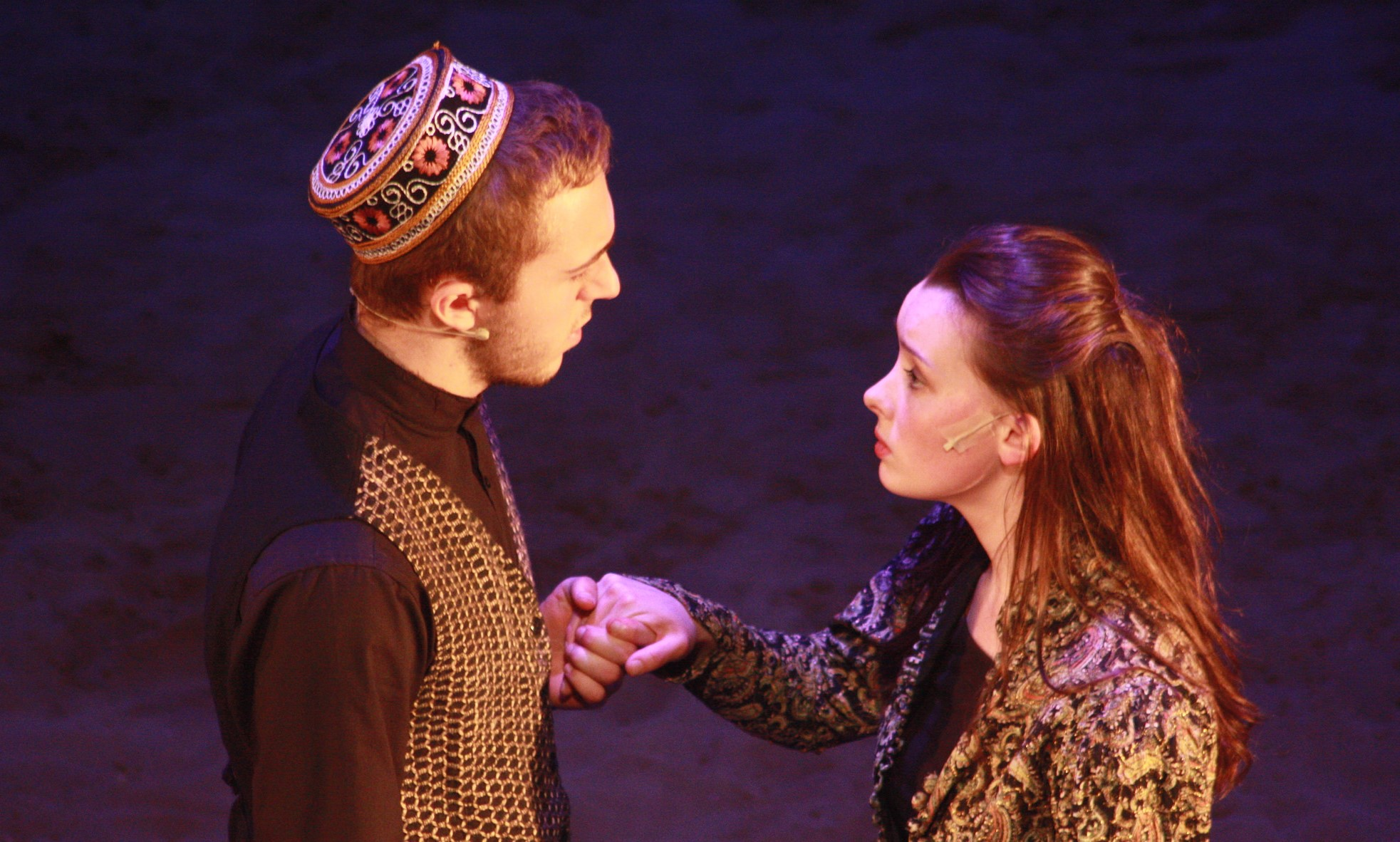
Ali and Nino, as depicted in a theatre production

== Automated performance ==
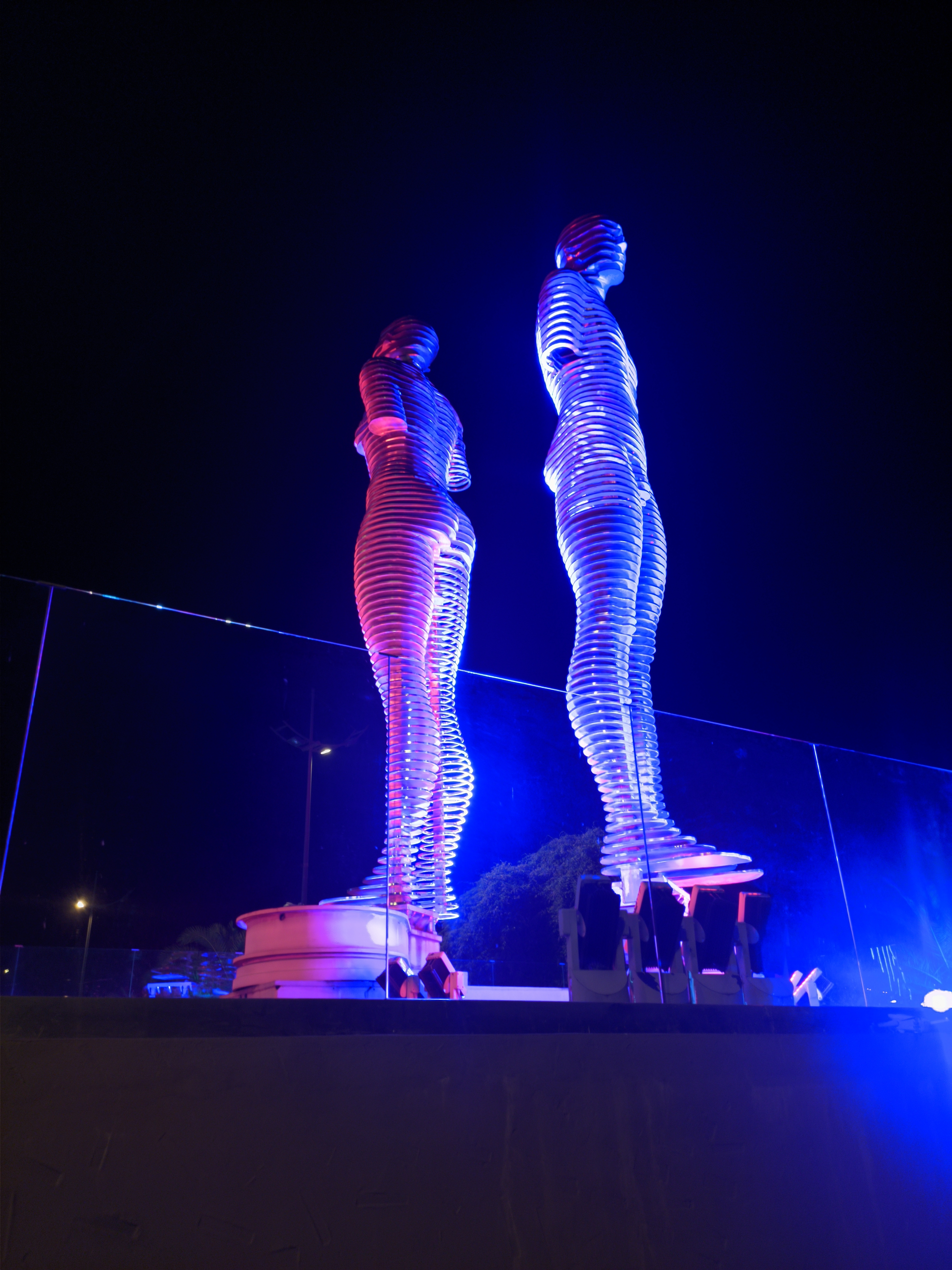
Ali and Nino at night time during the automated performance

Ali and Nino is an example of kinetic art, meaning the sculpture uses simple movements to express its meaning.

Each day at 7 pm, the statues begin to move towards one another and are lit up with neon lights. They eventually pass through each other, and never touch, a reference to Ali and Nino's original doomed fate. The automated performance lasts about 10 minutes.

On the automated performance aspect, sculptor Kvesitadze said:

People mostly associate it with love, so it stirs positive emotions within viewers. Anyone can interpret this monument as he/she prefers, yet the main message that my work conveys is that being together is possible for only a little time. This short period for someone might mean a whole century. This is the simple idea behind the sculpture.

== Location ==
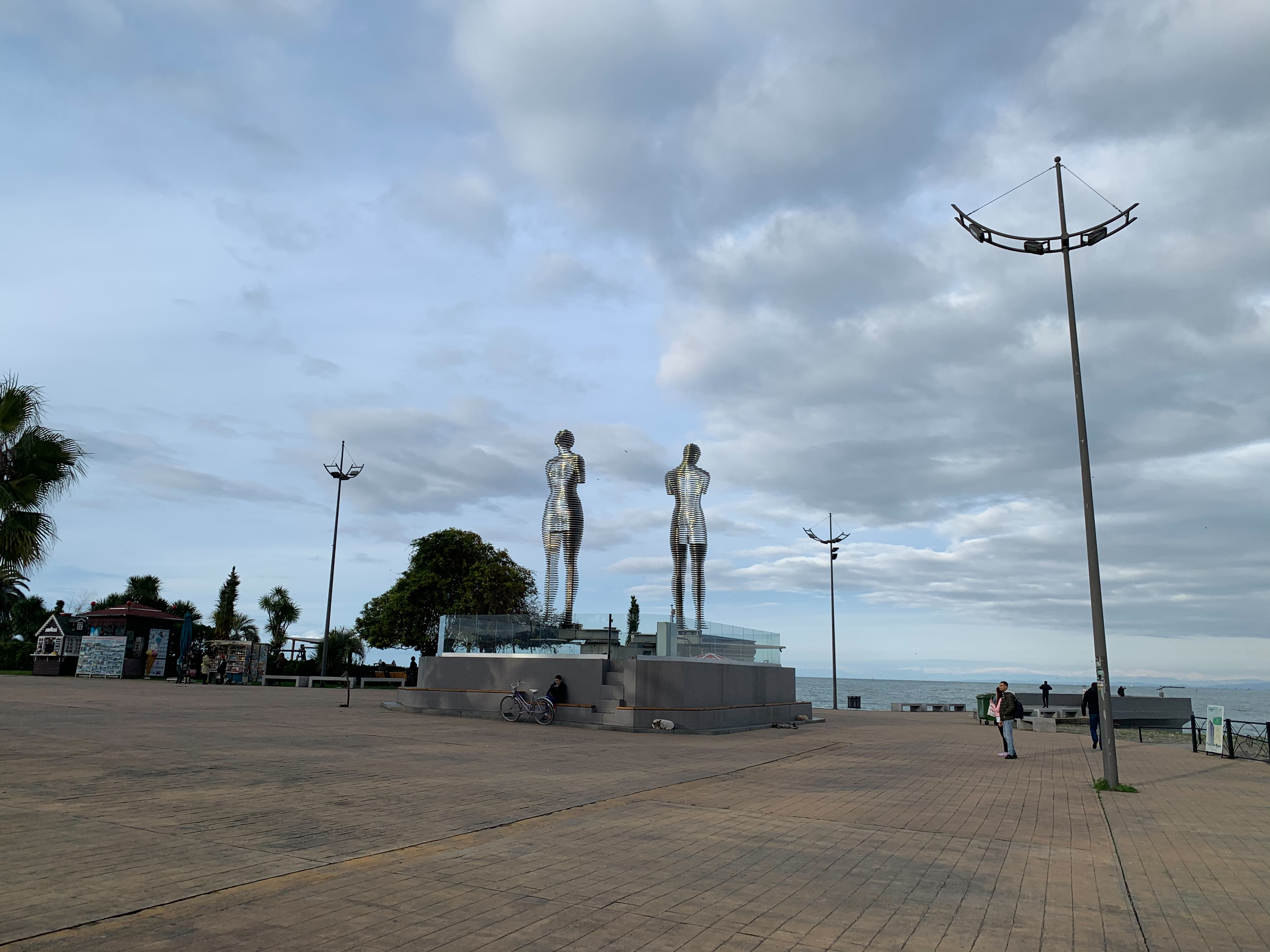
Ali and Nino off the shore of Batumi Harbor

Ali and Nino is currently located in the Batumi Harbor, within its Park of Wonders, off the shore of the Black Sea. It is adjacent to the ferris wheel and Alphabetic Tower.

The statue was originally located closer to the shore, but its base was damaged in a storm in 2015. Director of the boulevard administration Giorgi Zirakashvili said that the sculpture had to be moved in order to preserve the sea front. During the move, the Nino sculpture was dropped and damaged. Repairs took about one week. Its current location is about 50 m more inland from its original resting place. The move cost approximately 185,550 lari.

Kvesitadze was unsure of its new location next to the ferris wheel, fearing the statue may be misunderstood. On the topic, she said:

I am very happy that the placement of the sculpture was completed, and I have no doubt about it. It was nice to know that the work has so many fans. As for the new place, I believe that the location is good. However, I think that it is difficult to understand its placement near the Ferris wheel, as one cannot understand whether it is amusement or something else. But I hope that someday they will change the place either of the Ferris wheel or the sculpture.

== Reception ==
In 2016, Ali and Nino was listed among the world's top 10 most romantic statues.

It is affectionately called the "Statue of Love" by tourists. Actor Ashton Kutcher posted on Facebook about the statue, saying "This is truly moving."

== See also ==
- Ali and Nino (novel)
- BBC podcast interview with Kvesitadze
- Video of automated performance at Kvesitadze's website
