= Batumi Tower =

Skyscraper in Batumi, Georgia

Coordinates: 41.6539°N 41.6361°E

- Interactive map of the Batumi Tower area

General information
- Status: Completed
- Location: Batumi, Georgia, 4-6 Rustaveli Ave, Batumi 6000, Georgia
- Completed: 2012

Height
- Architectural: 656 ft (200 m)
- Observatory: 328 ft (100 m), located at the Batumi Tower Ferris Wheel

Technical details
- Material: All-concrete
- Floor count: 35

Design and construction
- Architect: Metal Yapi Holding

The Batumi Tower, also known as the Batumi Technological University Tower, is a skyscraper in Batumi, Georgia. Standing at 200 m (660 ft), it is currently the second-tallest building in Georgia, after the Alliance Centropolis Tower C, which reached 210 m (690 ft) upon topping out. The skyscraper is primarily constructed of concrete and uniquely features a ferris wheel embedded within its structure. Designed in the modernist style by Metal Yapi, construction was completed in 2012. Upon its completion, it was the tallest building in the Caucasus region until 2015, when it was surpassed by the SOCAR Tower in Baku, Azerbaijan, which stands 209 m (686 ft) tall.

== History ==
Construction of the tower was supported by Mikheil Saakashvili, who presided over the groundbreaking ceremony. The building was completed in 2012 but remained unoccupied for two years. In 2015, it was put up for auction, amid speculation that it would be renovated and converted into a hotel. As of 2024, renovations are still ongoing, although several floors have already been completed.

== Design ==
The ferris wheel on Batumi Tower

The tower features a modernist design and is particularly unique for the ferris wheel embedded in its facade at the 330-foot mark, positioned in one corner of the building. The windows are arranged in vertical, randomly alternating stripes, while a diagonal concrete line separates different sections of the facade, adding visual interest and emphasizing the building's geometric design.

The shape of the tower has been compared to the Transamerica Pyramid, featuring a similarly sloped, pyramid-like design. The structure rises from two adjacent multi-story buildings, which serve as the tower's lobby. The entire complex spans two addresses and includes an above-ground parking lot.

Both adjoining buildings in the complex share a similar design, featuring white concrete and blue glass facades. The smaller of the two includes a futuristic awning that functions as a valet area, while the taller building serves as a secondary office space.

== Controversy ==
The tower has been controversial due to its intended purpose. Several companies and prominent Georgian figures advocated for it to function as an educational facility, but the proposal faced significant criticism. As a result, the tower was repurposed and left largely abandoned, before being sold by the government for hotel development, as of 2024.

== Gallery ==
From the base

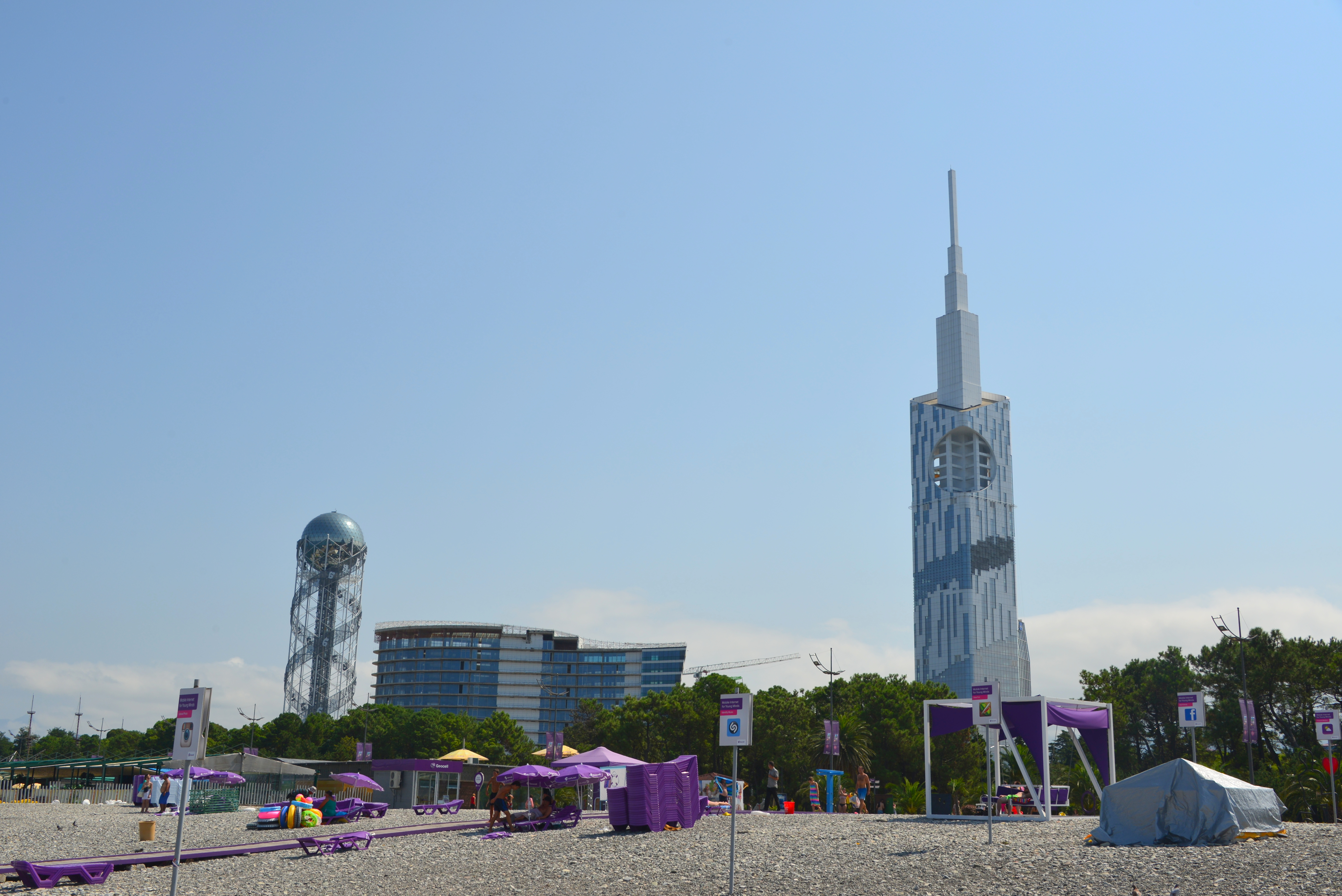

== See also ==
- List of tallest buildings in Georgia
- Modernist Architecture
- Batumi, the city in which the tower is located
- Alphabetic Tower, another unique structure nearby
