= List of tallest buildings in Georgia =

List of tallest buildings in Georgia may refer to:

- List of tallest buildings in Georgia (country)
- List of tallest buildings in Georgia (U.S. state)
