= Cube Tower =

Skyscraper in Batumi, Georgia

Coordinates: 41.6386°N 41.6160°E

- Interactive map of the Cube Tower area

General information
- Status: Under construction
- Type: Residential
- Location: Batumi, Georgia, 9 Zhiuli Shartava Avenue Batumi, Georgia

Height
- Height: 850 ft (260 m)

Technical details
- Material: All-concrete
- Floor count: 42

Design and construction
- Architect: Metropol

Website
- metropol-batumi.ge/projects/cube

Metropol Cube, also known as Cube Tower, is an under-construction skyscraper in Batumi, Georgia. At 850 ft (260 m), it will be the tallest building in Georgia. The building is estimated to be completed in 2027, and will have over 300 residential apartments and a rooftop observation deck/terrace.

== History ==
The Cube Tower is the result of a skyscraper boom in Batumi, and was brought up by the Metropol Architecture Group. The tower went through multiple different designs, eventually being settled on a 42-story, 850 ft (260 m) tall tower shaped like a stack of cubes. The tower was going to originally be 55 stories, but complications within Metropol had the tower's height reduced to 850 feet and 47 stories. The design won the “Mixed-Use Development for Georgia” category during the International Property Awards 2024.

== Design ==
The Cube Tower is designed to be multiple cubes, each slightly offset to the other. The base of the tower will be a restaurant and parking lot, and there will be an estimated 300 apartments inside of the tower. The Cube Tower is only a short distance from other notable buildings in Batumi, such as the Porta Batumi Tower.
