= Westin Bonaventure Hotel =

Hotel in Los Angeles, California (opened 1976)

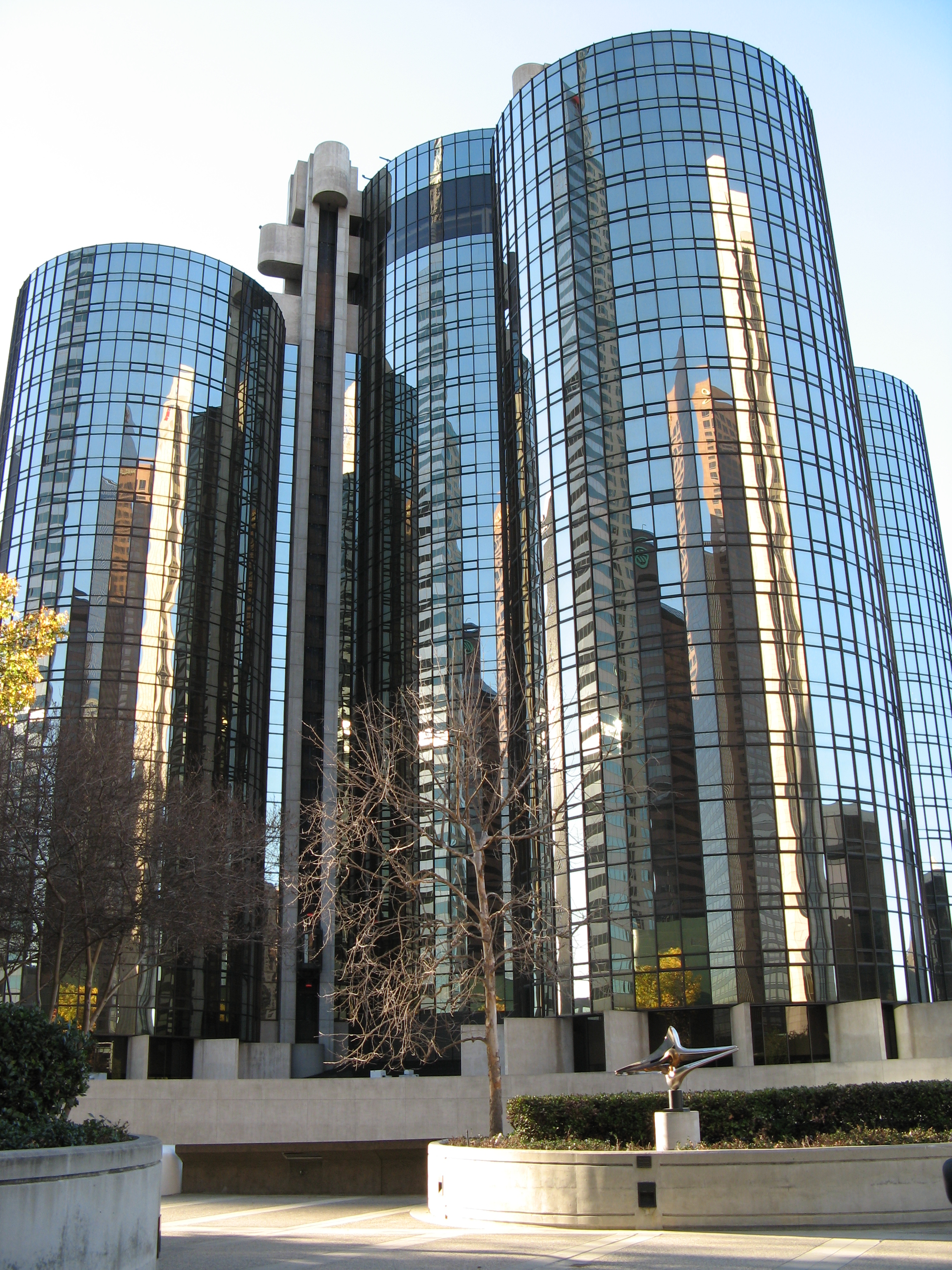
- Westin Bonaventure Hotel, 2006

- Location in Central Los Angeles
- Hotel chain: Westin Hotels

General information
- Location: 404 South Figueroa Street; Los Angeles, California
- Coordinates: 34.052778°N 118.255833°W
- Opening: January 1977
- Operator: Aimbridge Hospitality

Height
- Height: 367 ft (112 m)

Technical details
- Floor count: 33

Design and construction
- Architect: John C. Portman Jr.

Other information
- Number of rooms: 1,358
- Number of suites: 135
- Number of restaurants: Bona Vista Lounge; Hotel Food Court Restaurants; L.A. Prime; Lakeview Bistro; Lobby Court Coffee Bar
- Public transit: Grand Avenue Arts/Bunker Hill

Website
- https://bonaventurehotel.com/

The Westin Bonaventure Hotel and Suites is a 367-foot (112 m), 33-story hotel in Los Angeles, California, constructed between 1974 and 1977. It was designed by architect John C. Portman Jr. The top floor has a revolving restaurant and bar. It was originally owned by investors that included a subsidiary of Japanese conglomerate Mitsubishi Corporation and John Portman & Associates. The building is managed by Aimbridge Hospitality (IHR), and is valued at $200 million.

The hotel and its architect John Portman have been the subject of several documentaries and academic analyses.

== Reactions ==
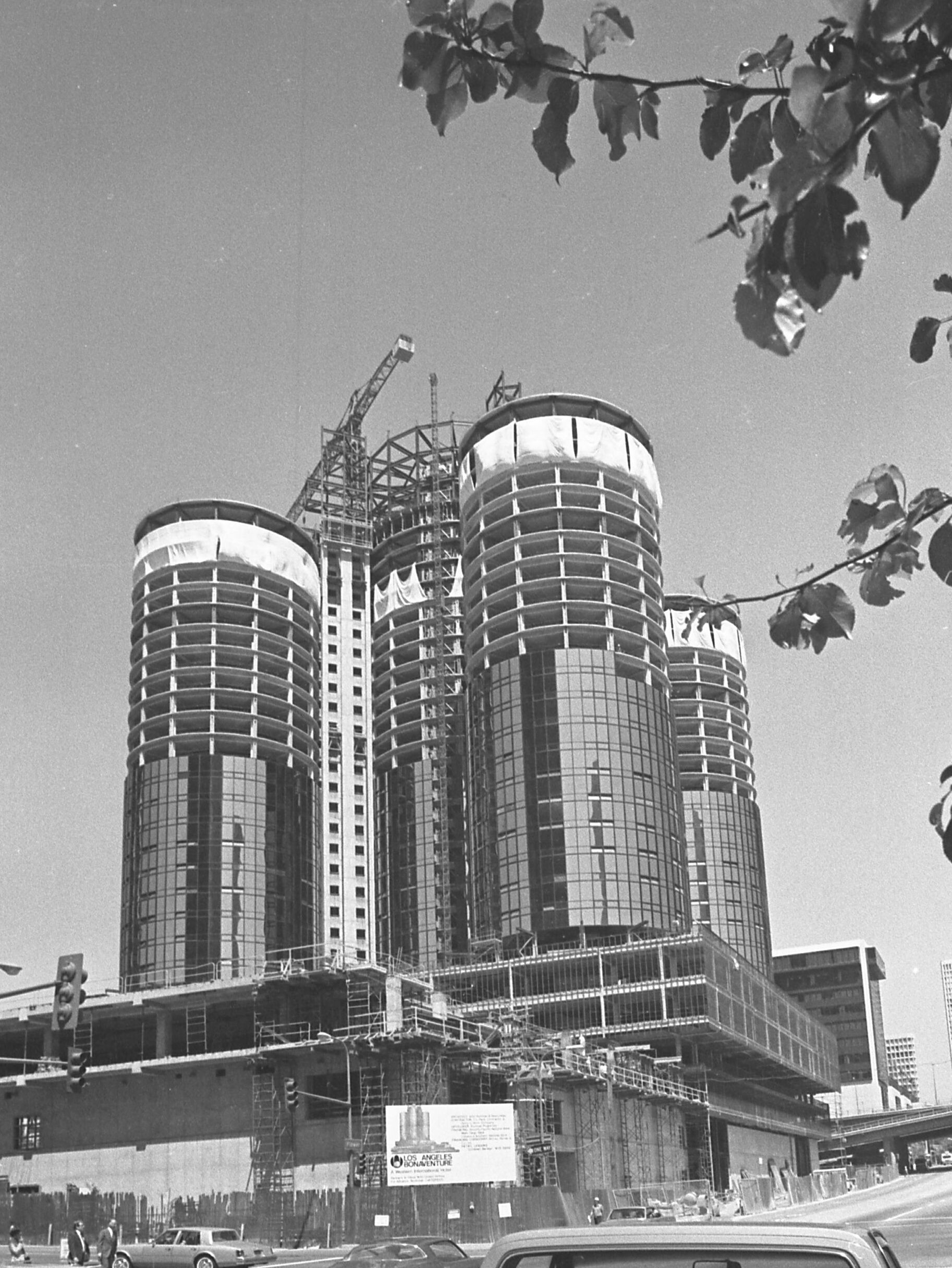
The hotel under construction in 1976

Marxist philosopher Fredric Jameson discusses the hotel in his 1984 essay, "Postmodernism, or, the Cultural Logic of Late Capitalism", and in his 1991 book by the same name. He writes that

the Bonaventura aspires to being a total space, a complete world, a kind of miniature city (and I would want to add that to this new total space corresponds a new collective practice, a new mode in which individuals move and congregate, something like the practice of a new and historically original kind of hyper-crowd).

In his book Postmodern Geographies: The Reassertion of Space in Critical Social Theory (1989), Edward Soja describes the hotel as

a concentrated representation of the restructured spatiality of the late capitalist city: fragmented and fragmenting, homogeneous and homogenizing, divertingly packaged yet curiously incomprehensible, seemingly open in presenting itself to view but constantly pressing to enclose, to compartmentalize, to circumscribe, to incarcerate. Everything imaginable appears to be available in this micro-urb but real places are difficult to find, its spaces confuse an effective cognitive mapping, its pastiche of superficial reflections bewilder co-ordination and encourage submission instead. Entry by land is forbidding to those who carelessly walk but entrance is nevertheless encouraged at many different levels. Once inside, however, it becomes daunting to get out again without bureaucratic assistance. In so many ways, its architecture recapitulates and reflects the sprawling manufactured spaces of Los Angeles.

== Floors and elevators ==
The hotel is a 33-story building, with no floors numbered "7" or "13"; the top floor is therefore numbered "35". The four elevator banks (each containing three cars for a total of 12) are named by colors and symbols: Red Circle (the only one that goes to "35"; the other three only go to "32"), Yellow Diamond, Green Square, and Blue Triangle. The color-coded system of directions was a later addition, as visitors found the space confusing and hard to navigate.

== Location filming ==
Several bronze plaques commemorate elevator scenes from three major films:

- In the Line of Fire, September 1993, "Green Square" elevator
- True Lies, September 1993, "Red Circle" and "Yellow Diamond" elevators
- Forget Paris, November 1994, "Yellow Diamond" elevator

It has been featured in many movies and television series over the years, including The Driver, Interstellar, Strange Days, Buck Rogers in the 25th Century (as part of the city of New Chicago), Wonder Woman, Blue Thunder, It's a Living, Starsky & Hutch, L.A. Law, The A-Team, Breathless, Matlock, This Is Spinal Tap, Playing God, Chronos, Nick of Time, Rain Man, Ruthless People, Logan's Run, My Fellow Americans, Midnight Madness, Moonlighting (TV series), Showtime, Hard to Kill, The Lincoln Lawyer, Chuck, Heaven Can Wait, Xanadu, The New Dragnet, Time After Time, Moby Dick, Zoolander, MaXXXine, Lethal Weapon 2, The Fantastic Journey and was destroyed (via special effects) in Escape from LA, Epicenter, and San Andreas. The front of the hotel was also featured in the British children’s television series Tots Tv ‘American Adventure’ special where Tilly, Tom and Tiny went to explore a different country and were observing tall buildings and went onto the roof of the hotel to observe the view of Los Angeles. While under construction, it appeared in the 1975 film The Wilderness Family (released a year before the hotel opened). In cartoon form, the building can be seen in the first shot of Jem in the episode "The Beginning", and in the anime Steins;Gate. In November 1979, the ABC soap opera General Hospital videotaped some on location scenes there dealing with Luke Spencer, played by Anthony Geary who was hired to assassinate Senator Mitch Williams. In 1999, Power Rangers Lost Galaxy used the building as the administration building of the space colony Terra Venture, with Red Ranger Leo falling from the building after a battle with main villain Trakeena.

In 2002, the hotel was the location for a Fear Factor stunt which involved crossing a bridge of plexiglass discs on cables suspended on the lobby's fifth floor. The television series It's a Living was set in a restaurant atop the Bonaventure. The hotel is also showcased in episodes of CSI and its exterior can be seen in Americathon, Mission: Impossible III, Almighty Thor, Hancock, and at the beginning of the Lionel Richie "Dancing on the Ceiling" music video. The building made appearances in the 2002 Aaliyah music video "More Than a Woman", 1991 Kylie Minogue music video "Step Back in Time", the 1985 Survivor music video "The Search Is Over", the 2004 video game Grand Theft Auto: San Andreas, the 2012 video game Call of Duty: Black Ops II (in the "Aftermath" multiplayer map) and in the 2013 video game Grand Theft Auto V with the name "Arcadius Business Center" (having three towers instead of four towers and featuring glass elevator animations).

The hotel was also used as a setting for R&B singer Usher's music video for the 2002 hit single, "U Don't Have to Call". A pivotal scene in the season four (2005) episode "Another Mister Sloane" of the espionage drama Alias took place in the Bonaventure Hotel as well, while it was also featured in season one (2017), episode five of another espionage drama, Counterpart. In 2021, Rihanna's "Savage x Fenty Show Vol. 3" was filmed entirely on location at the hotel. The hotel also hosted the first task for the final leg of The Amazing Race 33, which aired in 2022.

== Gallery ==
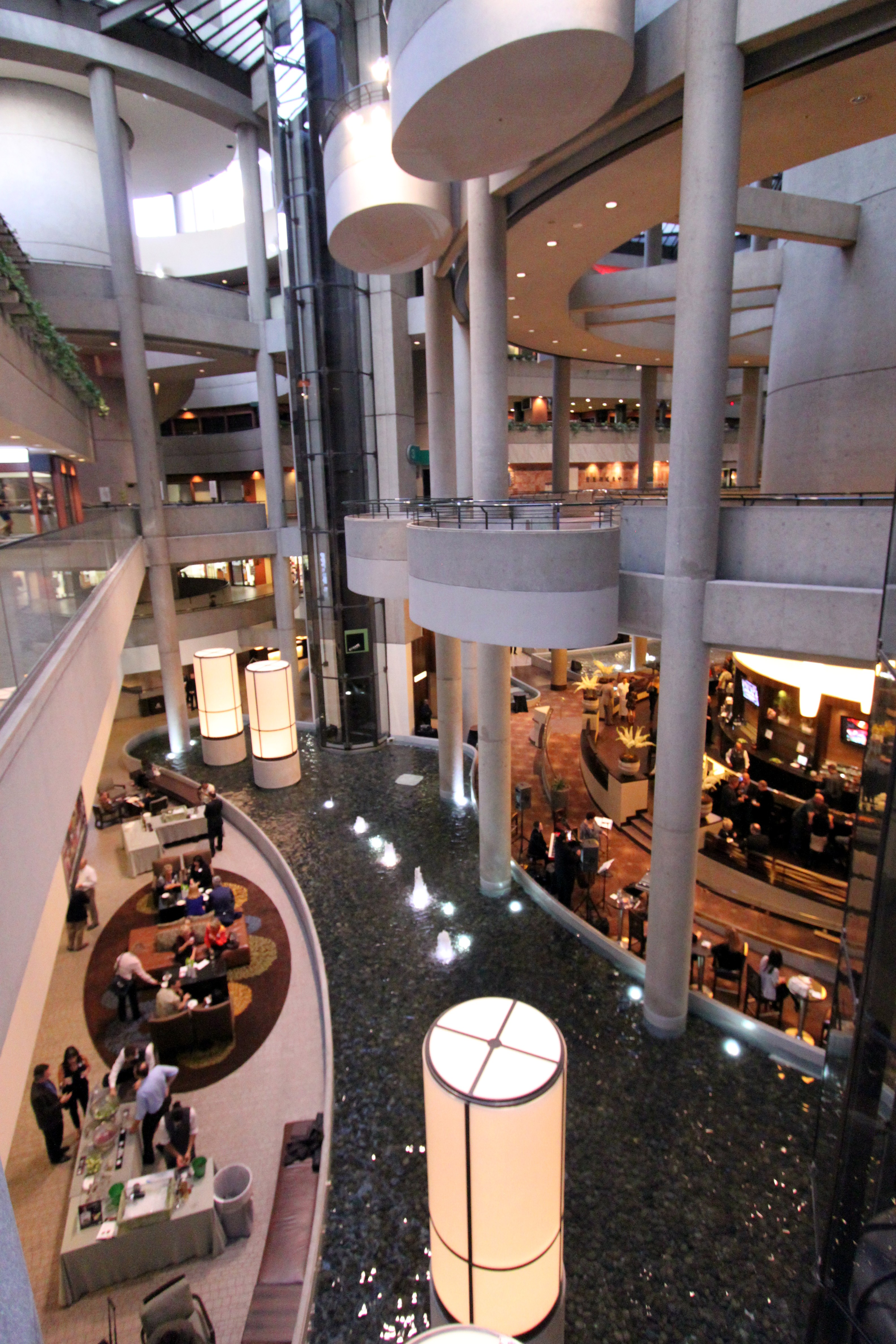
Hotel lobby

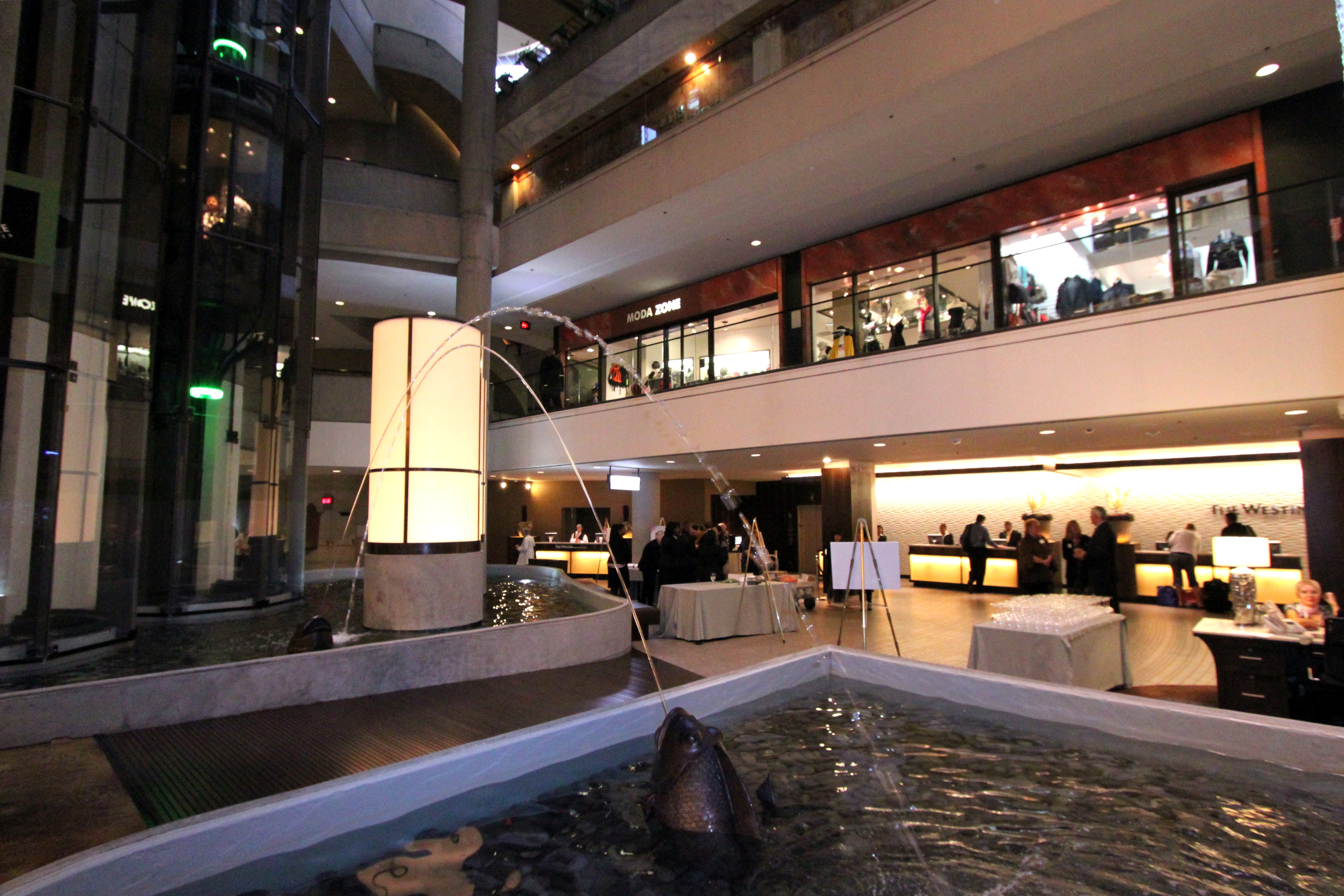
Front desk

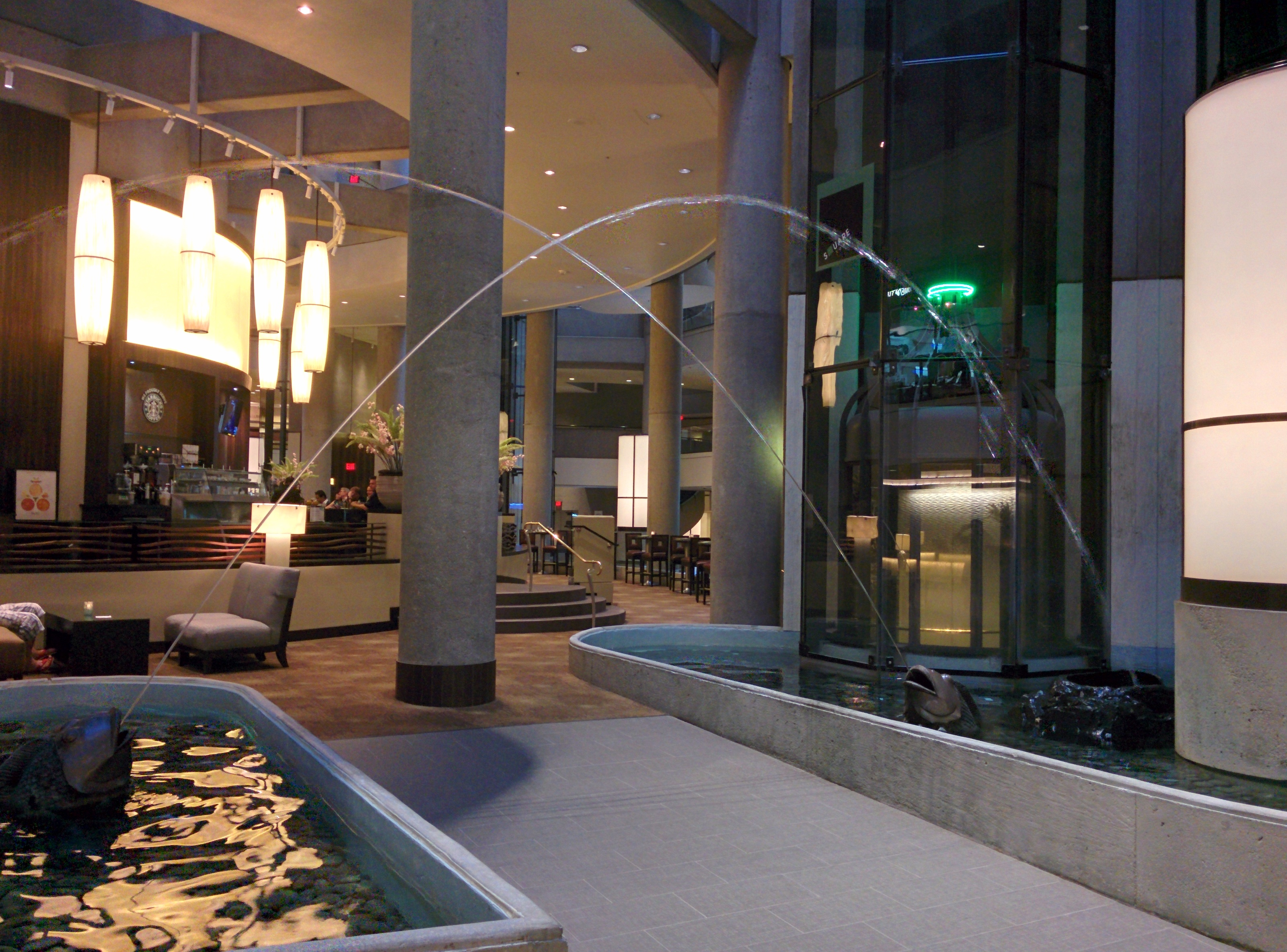
Lobby fountain

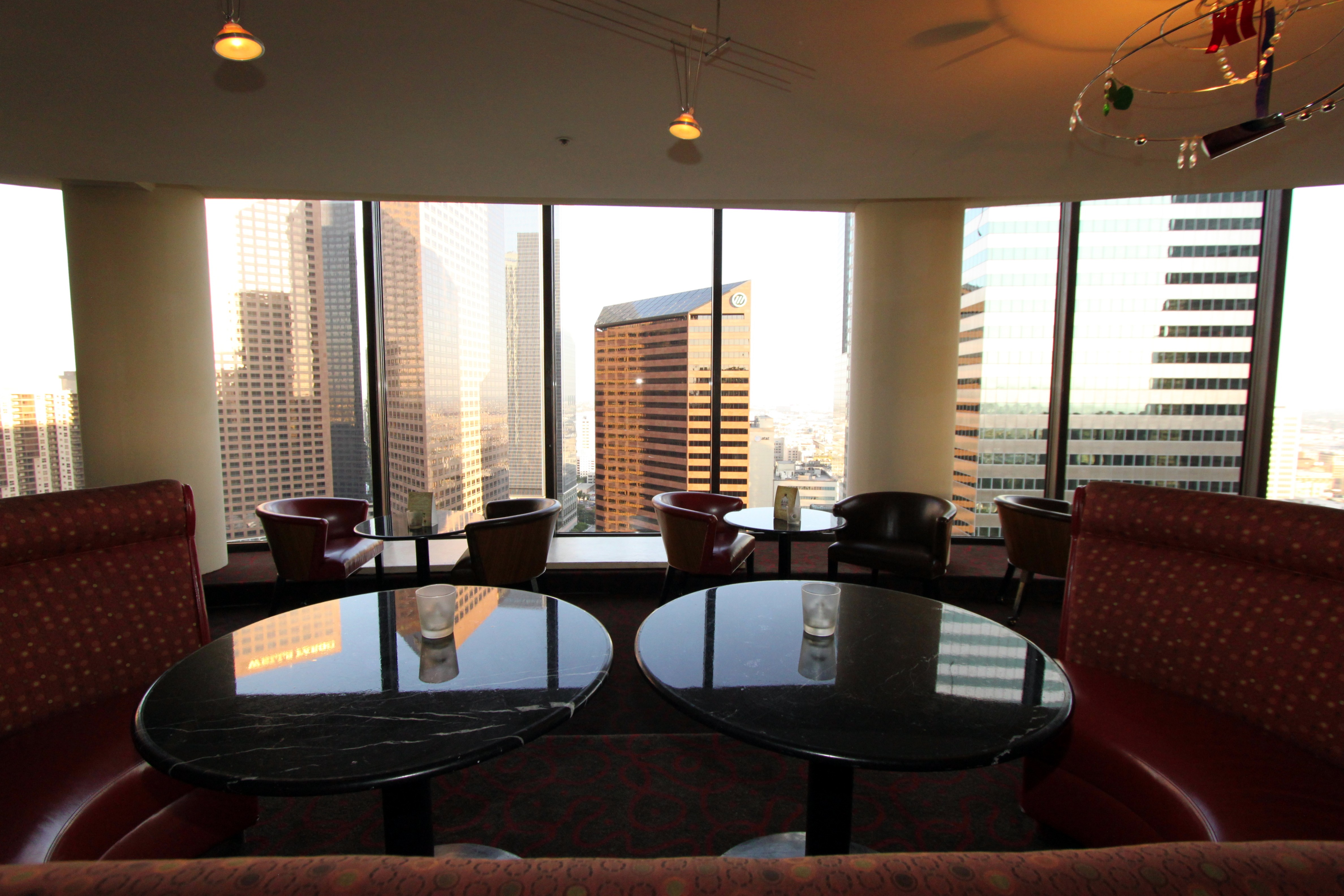
Bona Vista Lounge

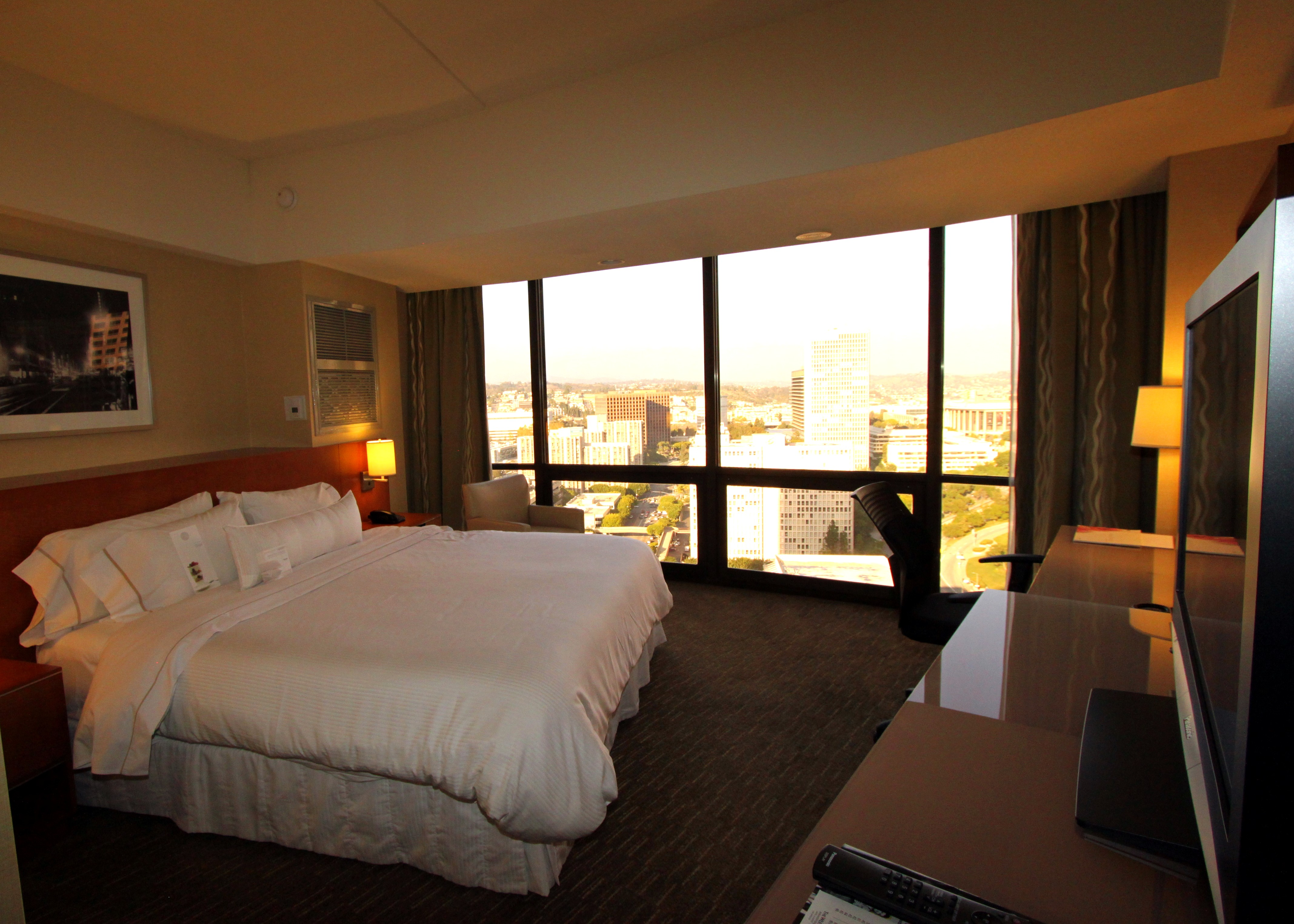
Standard King bedroom

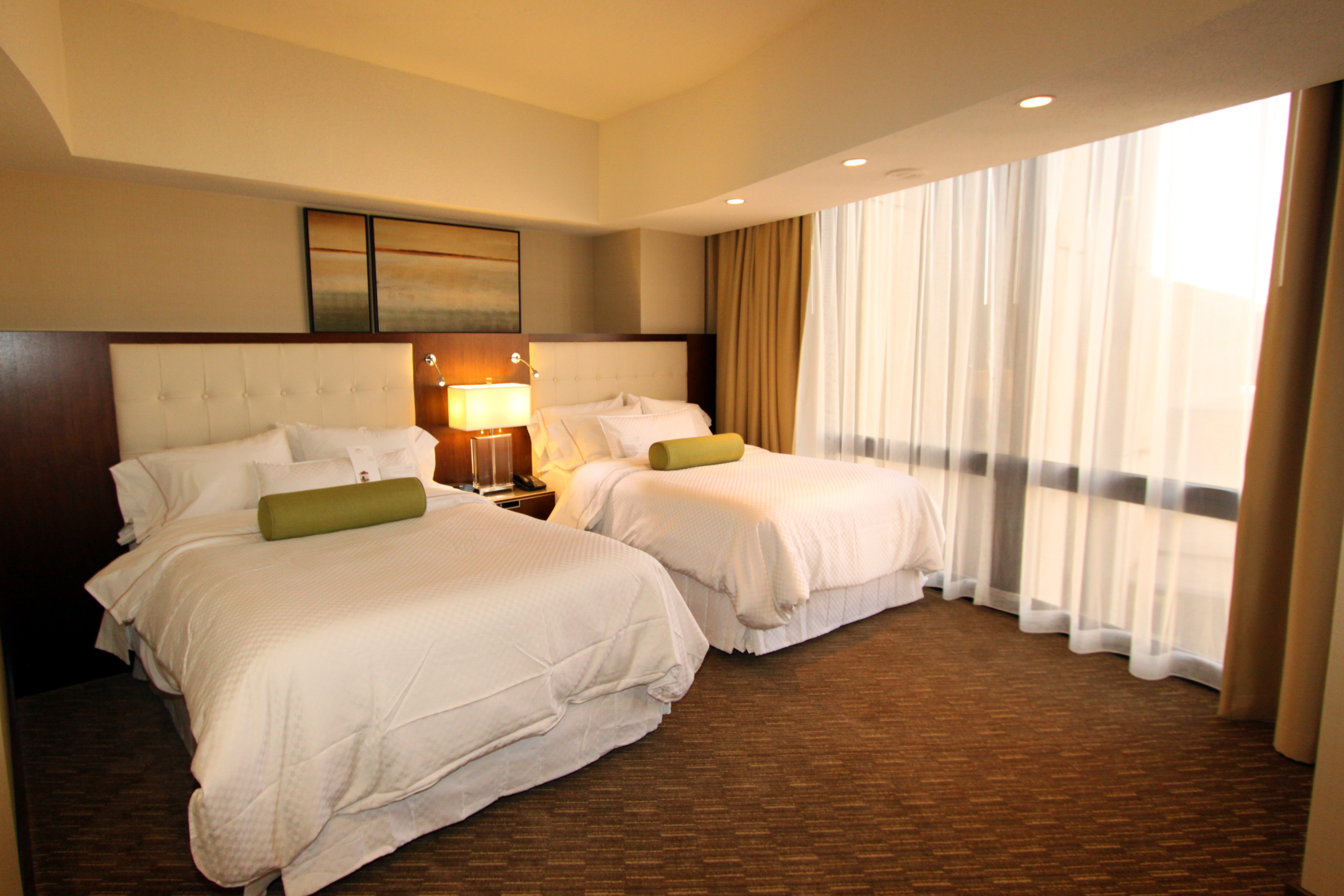
Double room

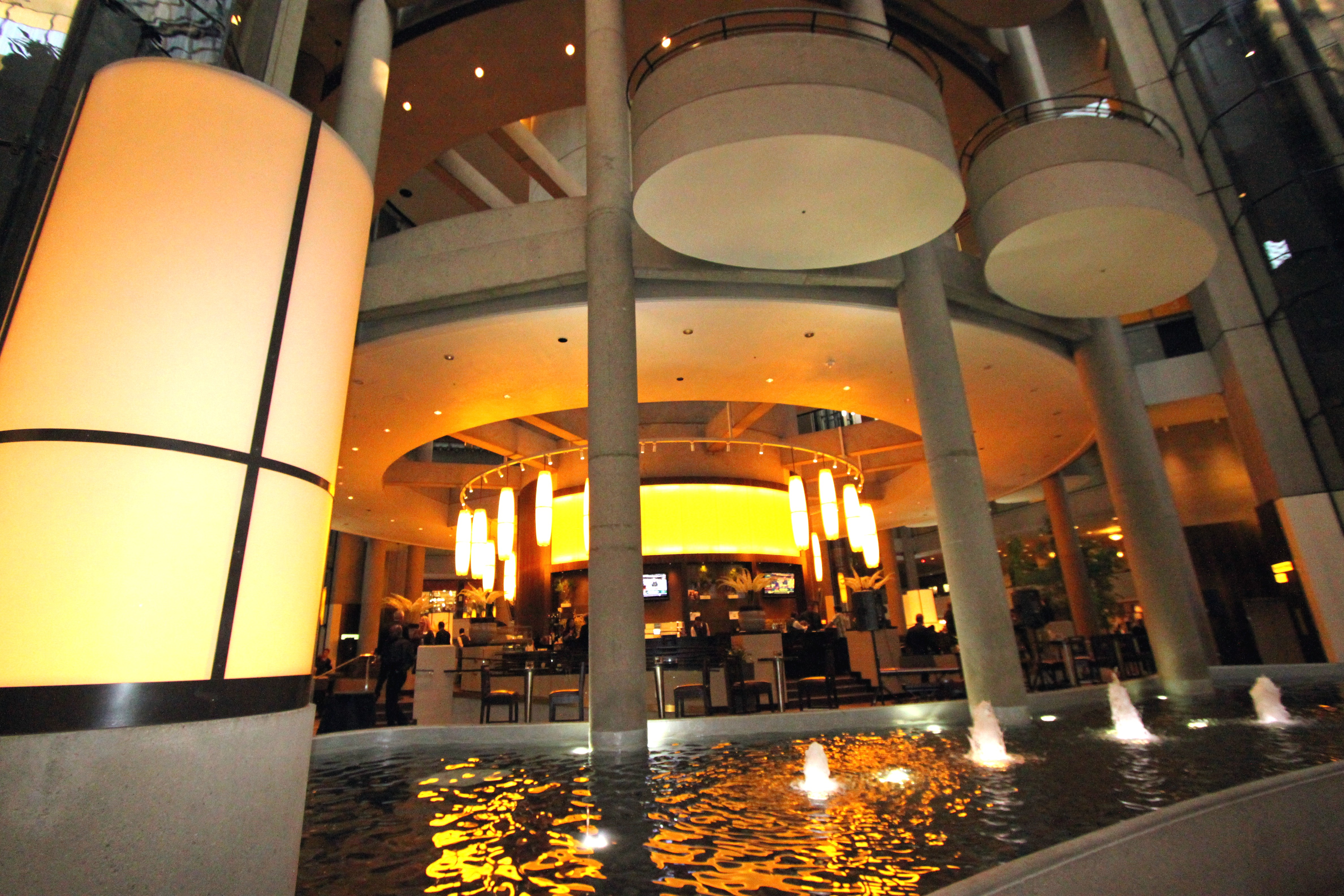
Lobby bar and fountain

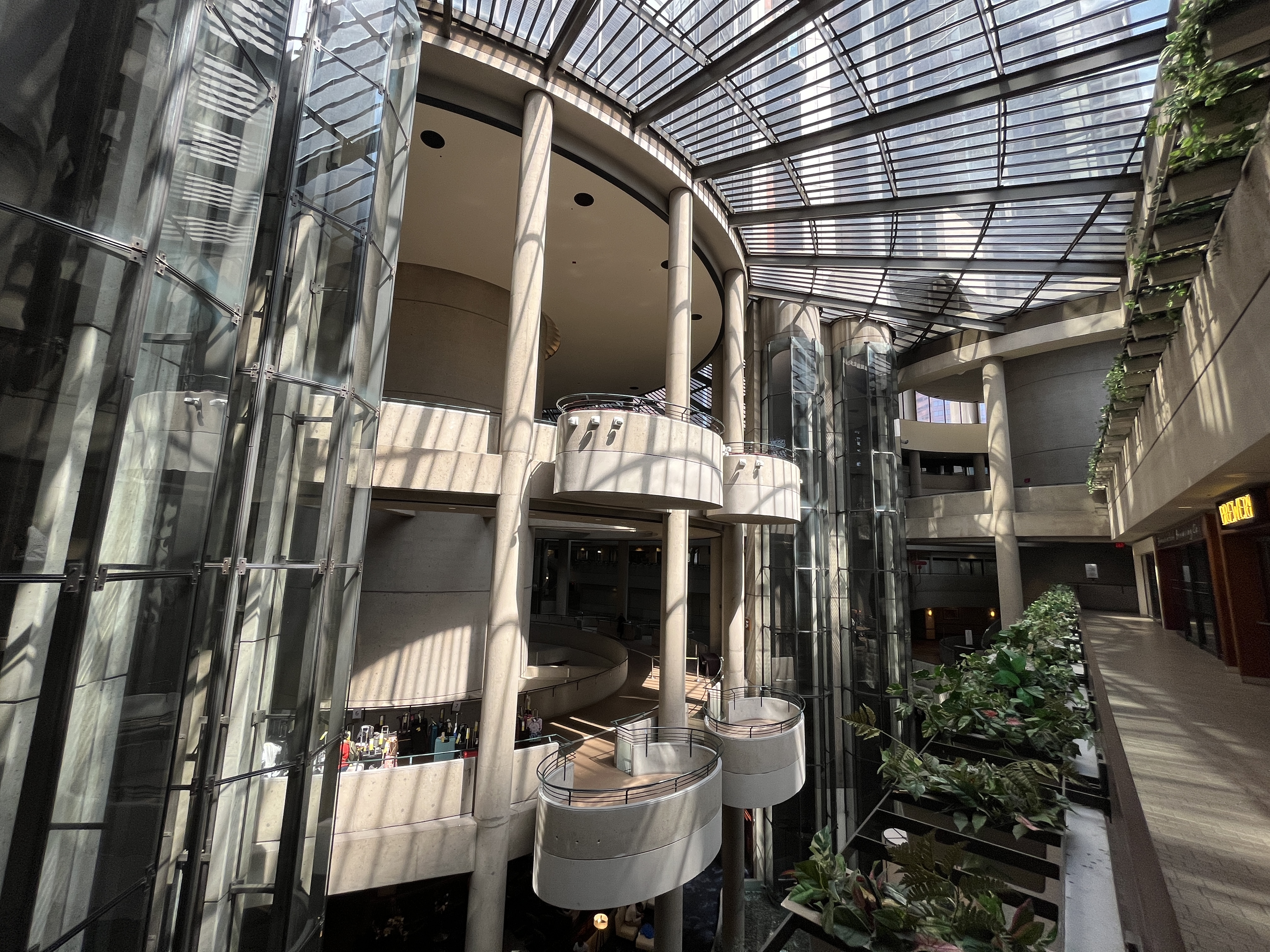
View of atrium

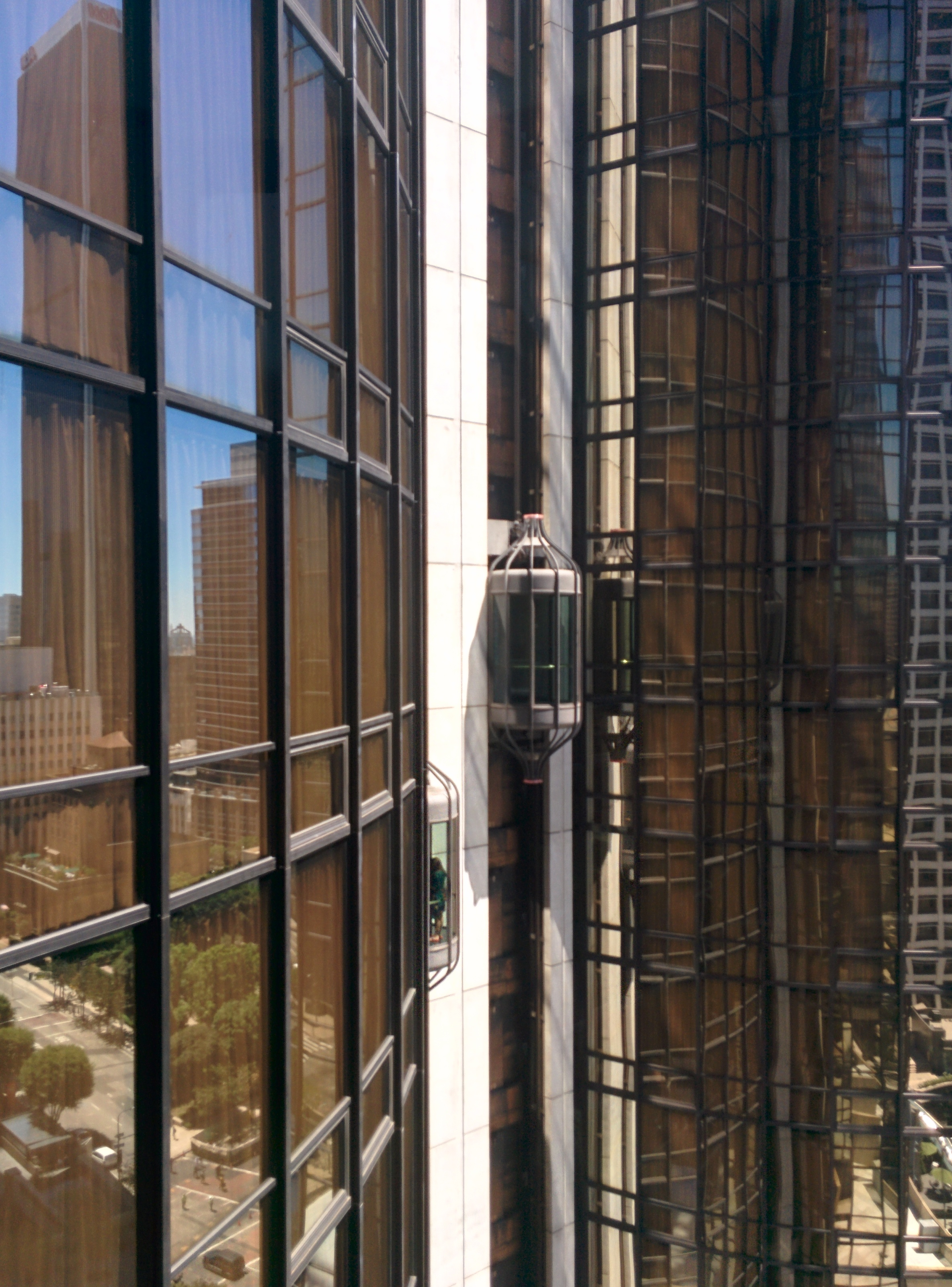
External elevator

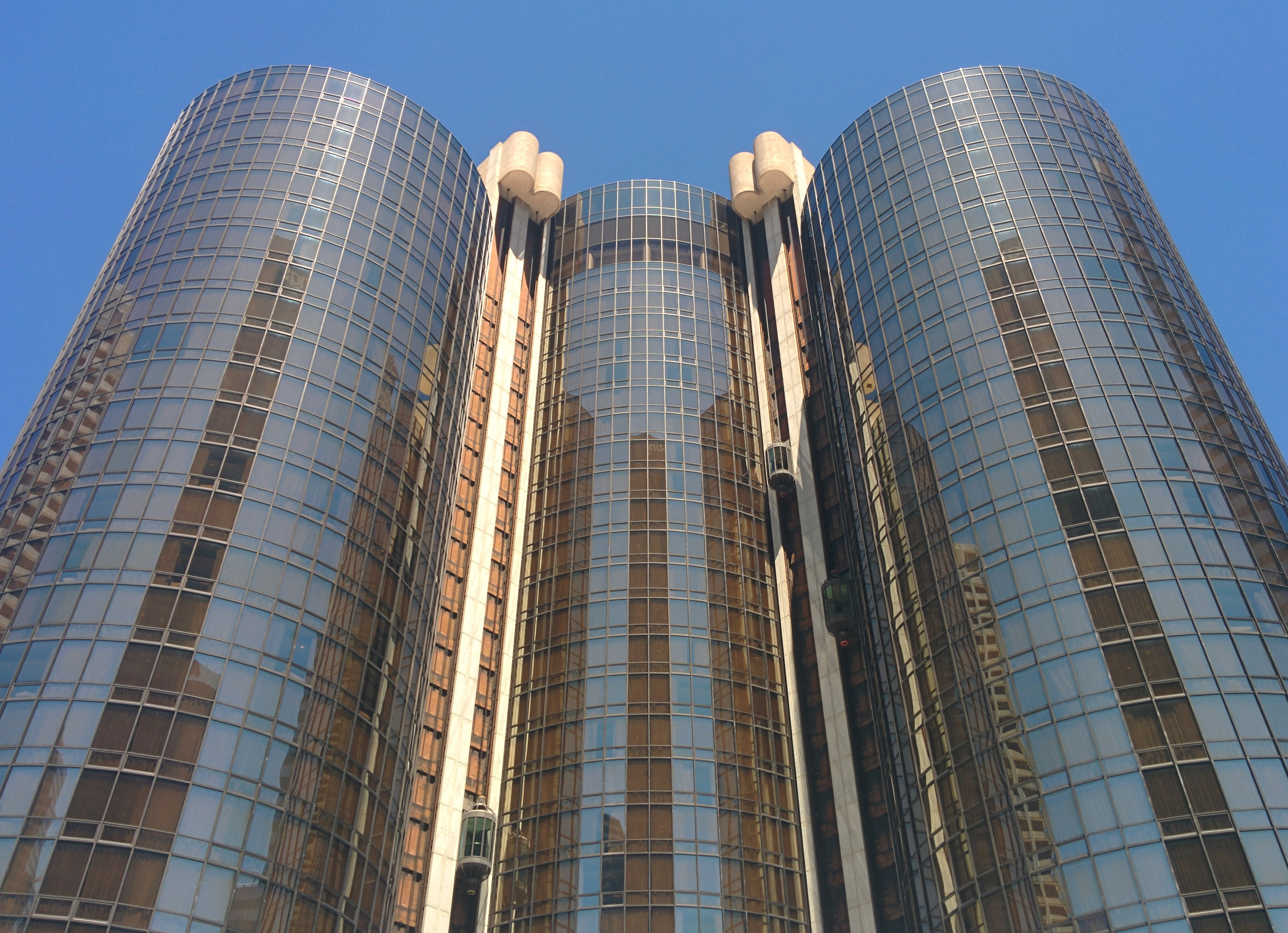
Looking upwards at hotel towers

== See also ==
- Renaissance Center, completed in 1977 in Detroit, Michigan
