= Alliance Privilege =

Skyscraper in Batumi, Georgia

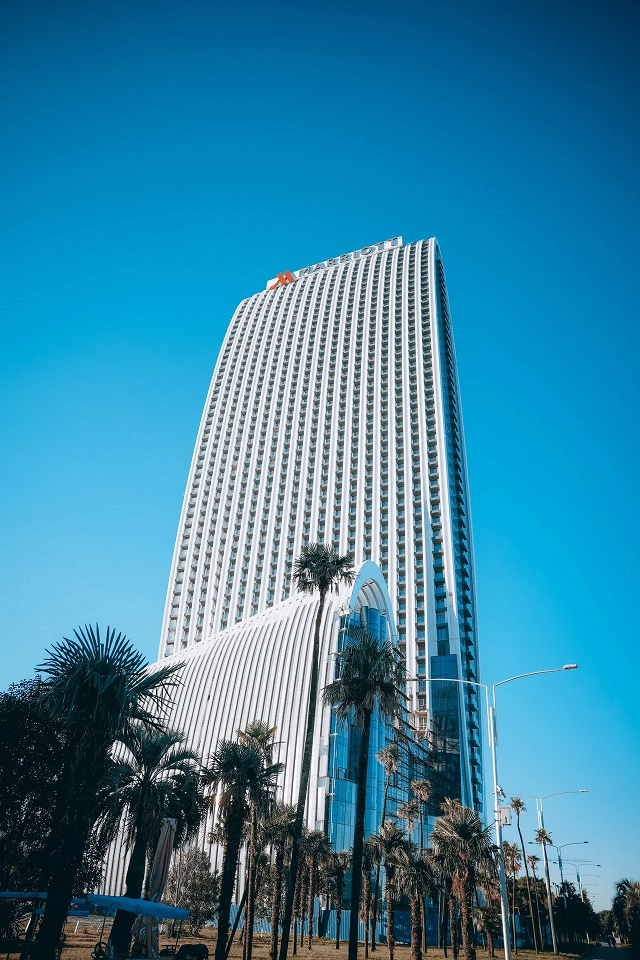

General information
- Type: Hotel
- Location: 42 Rustaveli Avenue Batumi, Georgia
- Coordinates: 41.64856°N 41.62381°E
- Construction started: 2020
- Completed: 2022
- Owner: Alliance Group
- Operator: Marriott International

Height
- Roof: 190 m (623 ft)

Technical details
- Floor count: 54
- Floor area: 24,250 m^{2} (261,000 sq ft)

Design and construction
- Architect: Alliance Engineering

Website
- Official website

The Alliance Privilege is a skyscraper hotel in Batumi, Georgia. Built between 2020 and 2026, yet construction of most facilities is not yet finished (see below), the tower stands at 190 m (623 ft) tall with 55 floors and is the current 3rd tallest building in Georgia.

== History ==
The complex, which consists of one main elliptic curved tower with an organic-volume base, is located on the Batumi Boulevard, on the seaside, and features a neofuturistic architectural style. It will include a five-star Marriott Hotel which might be ready only in 2028, as well as exclusive apartments, but as of the end of 2026, many are not finished yet. Located in the first line of the sea resort of Batumi. Nearby: the main attractions of the city, the Dolphinarium, the park, and the lake Nurigel. A few meters away—Primorsky Boulevard and the beach.

As of the end of 2026, construction of the exclusive project is not yet finished. The 160-room Marriott Hotel might begin operating only in 2028 and will occupy floors 2 thru 12. Starting early 2026, some privately-owned rooms and apartments on floors 14 thru 52 are available for rent through various rental sites under the “Alliance Privilege” trademark. Starting late 2026, the new project will be managed by the US-based AimBridge Hospitality International.

Various services and infrastructure in the complex might only be ready in 2028 or later, such as underground parking, a swimming pool, a spa, a fitness center, a casino, restaurants and cafes, open terraces, a children’s entertainment center, conference halls, a ballroom, a reception, a concierge, security, technical stuff, a cleaning service, and video surveillance.

== See also ==
- List of tallest buildings in Georgia (country)

== Gallery ==
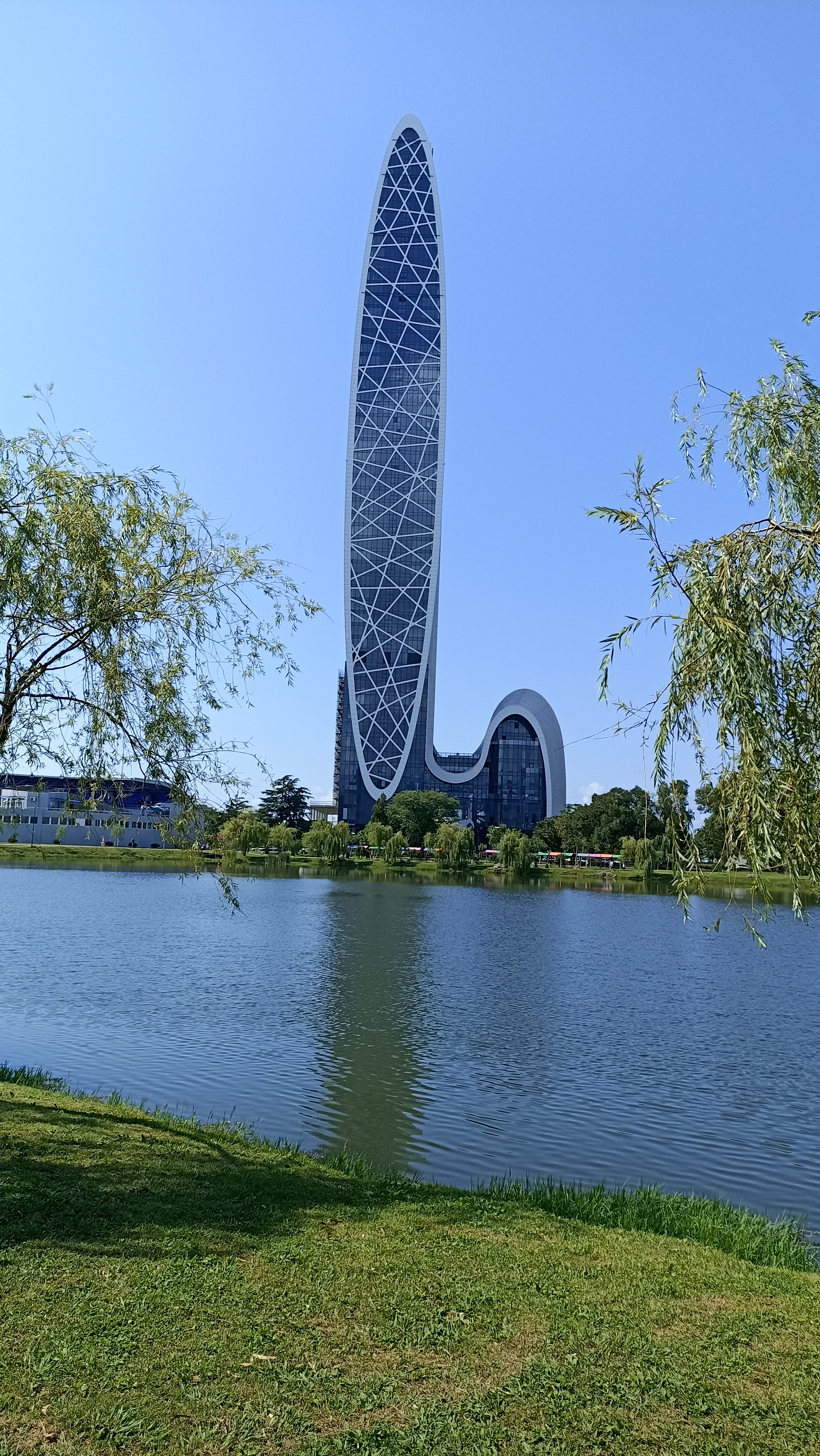
The tower seen from the Batumi Dolphinarium
