= Porta Batumi Tower =

Residential skyscraper in Batumi, Georgia

Coordinates: 41.6544°N 41.6386°E

General information
- Status: Completed
- Type: Residential
- Location: Batumi, Georgia, 4-6 Rustaveli Ave, Batumi 6000, Georgia
- Completed: 2017

Height
- Height: 538 ft (164 m)

Technical details
- Material: All-concrete
- Floor count: 43

Design and construction
- Architect: System Construction Company

Website
- www.portabatumitower.com

The Porta Batumi Tower is a residential skyscraper in Batumi, Georgia. Standing at 164 meters (538 feet), it is the fifth-tallest building in Georgia. The tower was completed in 2017 and comprises 43 floors. Upon its completion, it was the tallest residential building in Georgia until 2024, when it was surpassed by the Azure Tower, which stands 171.7 m (563 ft) tall.

== History ==
Construction of the tower began in 2014, during a period of rapid skyscraper development in Batumi. System Construction Company oversaw the project, which was completed in 2017. Since its opening, the building has served a residential purpose, with 41 of its 43 floors entirely dedicated to apartments and penthouses.

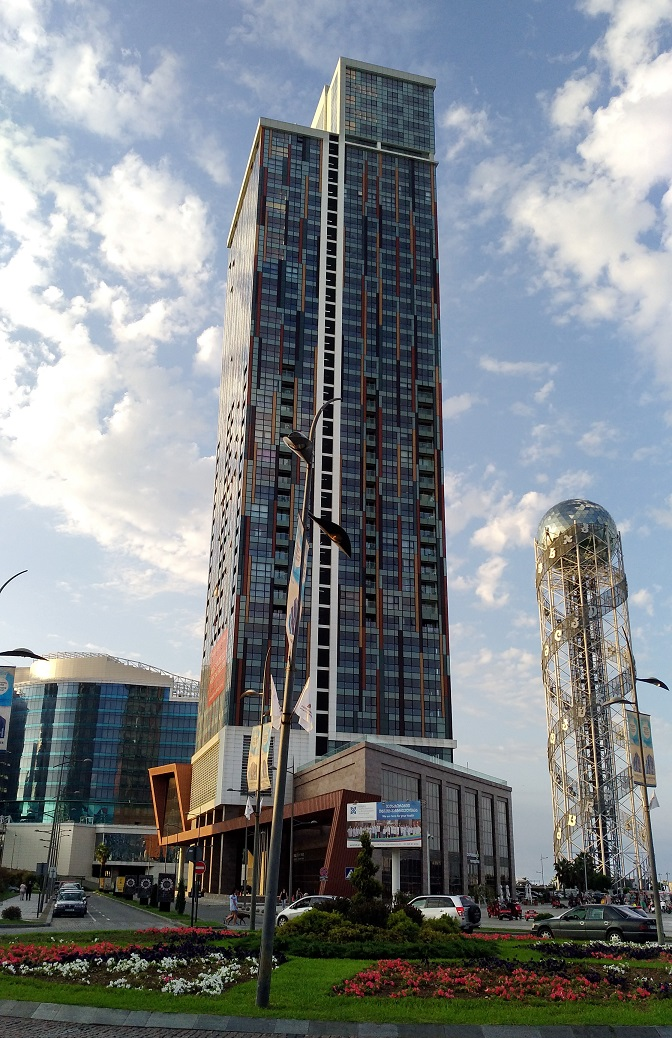
Porta Batumi Tower and Alphabetic Tower, 2024

== Design ==
The tower is designed in the modernist style and consists of two tube structures of unequal height, which are connected to form a single unified structure.
