= Alliance Centropolis Towers =

Skyscraper in Batumi, Georgia

- The towers under construction in July 2026

General information
- Status: Under construction
- Type: Residential, Office, Hotel
- Location: Sherif Khimshiashvili St., Batumi, Georgia
- Coordinates: 41.64469°N 41.61823°E
- Construction started: 2021
- Completed: 2028
- Cost: $420 Million

Height
- Roof: 228 m (748 ft) (Tower B); 210 m (689 ft) (Towers A and C)

Technical details
- Floor count: 62 (Tower B); 56 (Towers A and C)

Design and construction
- Architect: Alliance Engineering
- Developer: Alliance Group

Website
- alliance.ge/en/projects/alliance-centropolis

Alliance Centropolis Towers is a mixed-use skyscraper complex under construction in the Pivzavod district of Batumi, Georgia. Due for completion in 2028, the complex consists of three main towers cojoined at the base, with the tallest (Tower B) set to stand at 228 m (748 ft) tall with 62 floors. Tower C is currently topped out, standing at 210 m (689 ft) tall with 56 floors, which is the tallest building in Georgia.

== History ==
The tower complex is situated on Batumi's Sherif Khimshiashvili seaside boulevard. The development mixed-use residential facilitites such as hotel-type apartments, a Hyatt Centric hotel, a World Trade Center with exhibition spaces, and 24 leisure amenities. The plot area was previously occupied for two decades by an abandonned soviet-era thirteen floor shell which was demolished.

One of the project's main funders is Bank of Georgia. The institution annouced their implication into the project in 2021, scoring a total of 420 million USD invested into the complex which houses a total of 170 suites and 4,500 apartments. Initially, Tower C was announced to have 50 floors, and Towers A and B to have 45. However, in time, project changes showed the final configurations to have changed to 62 levels for Tower B, and 56 each for Towers A and C.

In 2020, Georgian real estate company Alliance Group announced the project of the complex as a mixed-use development in Batumi planned to include hotel, residential, office, retail and exhibition spaces. In January 2021, Hyatt announced the development of a 180-room Hyatt Centric hotel at the site under a management agreement with Alliance Group. Construction was formally launched alongside site groundbreaking in March 2021. The development also included a World Trade Center with business and exhibition facilities.

Due to their geographic position at seaside, the complex features wind and seismic vibration control systems. The wind engineering solutions alongside facade material tests were carried in accordance with IBC2021 standards by Australian company Windtech Consultants. Canadian engineering company Motioneering equipped the complex with the water damper system also known as the Tuned Sloshing Damper (TSD), which uses the inertia of a water-filled tank located at the top levels of the building, thus enhancing the stability during natural motion. At the time of the construction's last steps, this techology was only used in ten projects around the world including Taipei 101, One World Trade Center and Shanghai Tower.

== Construction chronology ==
The construction site in February 2023

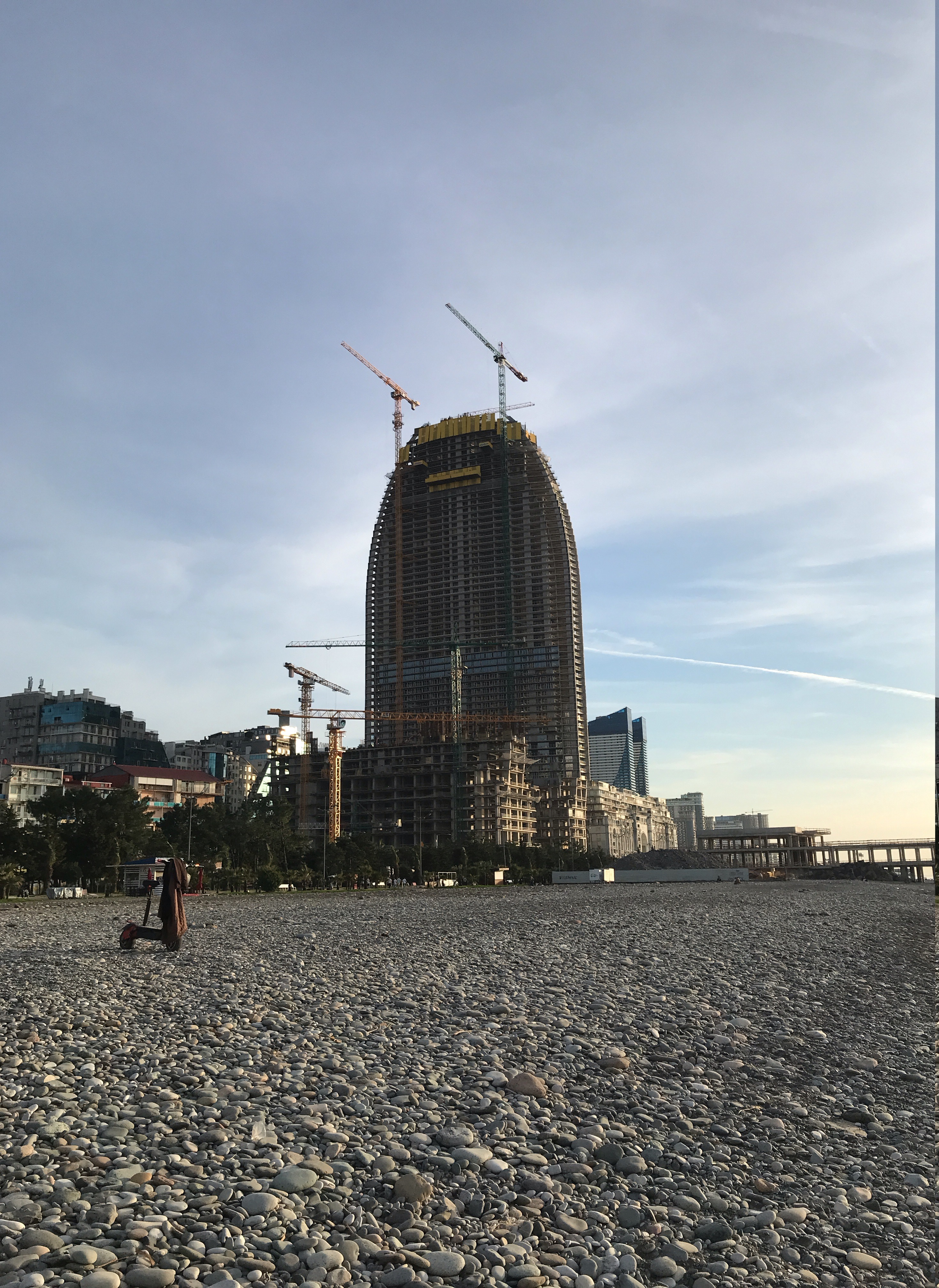
and in March 2025

== See also ==
- List of tallest buildings in Georgia (country)
