= Villaplana =

Villaplana is a surname. Notable people with the surname include:

- Enrique Villaplana (1914–1983), Spanish racewalker
- Rodolfo Villaplana (born 1975), Spanish-Venezuelan artist
