= Rodolfo Villaplana =

Venezuelan painter (born 1975)

Rodolfo Villaplana (RAVE)
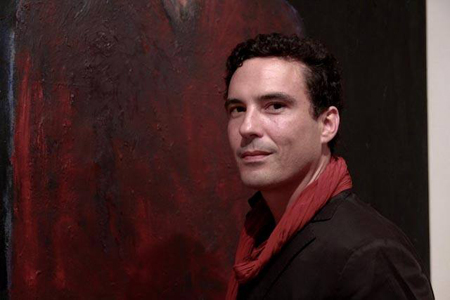
- Rodolfo Villaplana (2015)
- Born: January 5, 1975; Valencia, Venezuela
- Education: Chelsea College of Art and Design
- Known for: painting
- Style: portraits, still life, abstract

Rodolfo Villaplana (RAVE) (born, January 5. 1975, in Valencia, Venezuela) is a Spanish-Venezuelan artist who lived and worked in Paris and London, and now resides and works in Milan, Italy.

== Biography ==
After graduating in 2013 with an MFA from the Chelsea College of Arts, in London, he was endorsed by the Young Masters panel. He exhibited at the London Art Fair and PINTA International Art Fair in London. In 2015 he participatedin the Art Venice Biennale3. Villaplana was chosen to represent the UK in the Iranian Biennale of Art and exhibited together with Tamara Kvesitadze at a group exhibition represented by the Galerie Kornfeld. In 2015 had his first major solo exhibition titled "Duchamp is Dead" at the Museum of Modern Art (MOMA) in Tbilisi.

== Style ==
Villaplana is best known for his portraits often containing motives of nudity, still life of flowers and several large scale paintings, such as his works "Surprise at Pimlico" or "Ratzinger Revisited."

He draws his inspiration from Neo-Expressionism and artist such as Lucian Freud and Francis Bacon. In October 2016, in a London show curated by Thierry Morel, featuring Rodolfo Villaplana and Tamara Kvesitadze, Thierry Morel wrote about Vilaplana's art: "He deploys with his brush a wide-ranging symphony of hues and colours with uncompromising courage verging on brutality in order to portray 'the inner being' that he perceives in his sitter's body and gaze. The rough and earthy texture of his oil paint seeks to defy the limitations imposed by a two-dimensional image -- a mysterious artistic process of construction and de-construction, adjunction, falsification even, that challenges the viewers' senses and leaves them with a mixture of awe and raw emotions."
