= Tamara Kvesitadze =

Georgian artist and sculptor (born 1968)

- Born: 1968 (age 57–58)
- Known for: Sculpture

Tamara Kvesitadze (Georgian: თამარა კვესიტაძე; born 1968) is a Georgian artist and sculptor. She is best known for her sculpture "Man and Woman", later renamed "Ali and Nino", designed in 2007 and installed on the seafront in Batumi, Georgia since 2010. The renaming is connected to Ali and Nino, a 1937 novel about a romance between a Muslim Azerbaijani boy and a Christian Georgian girl in Baku from 1918 to 1920.

Glebe House in Glebe Place, Chelsea, London contains 13 artworks commissioned from Kvesitadze.
