= List of tallest buildings in Georgia (country) =

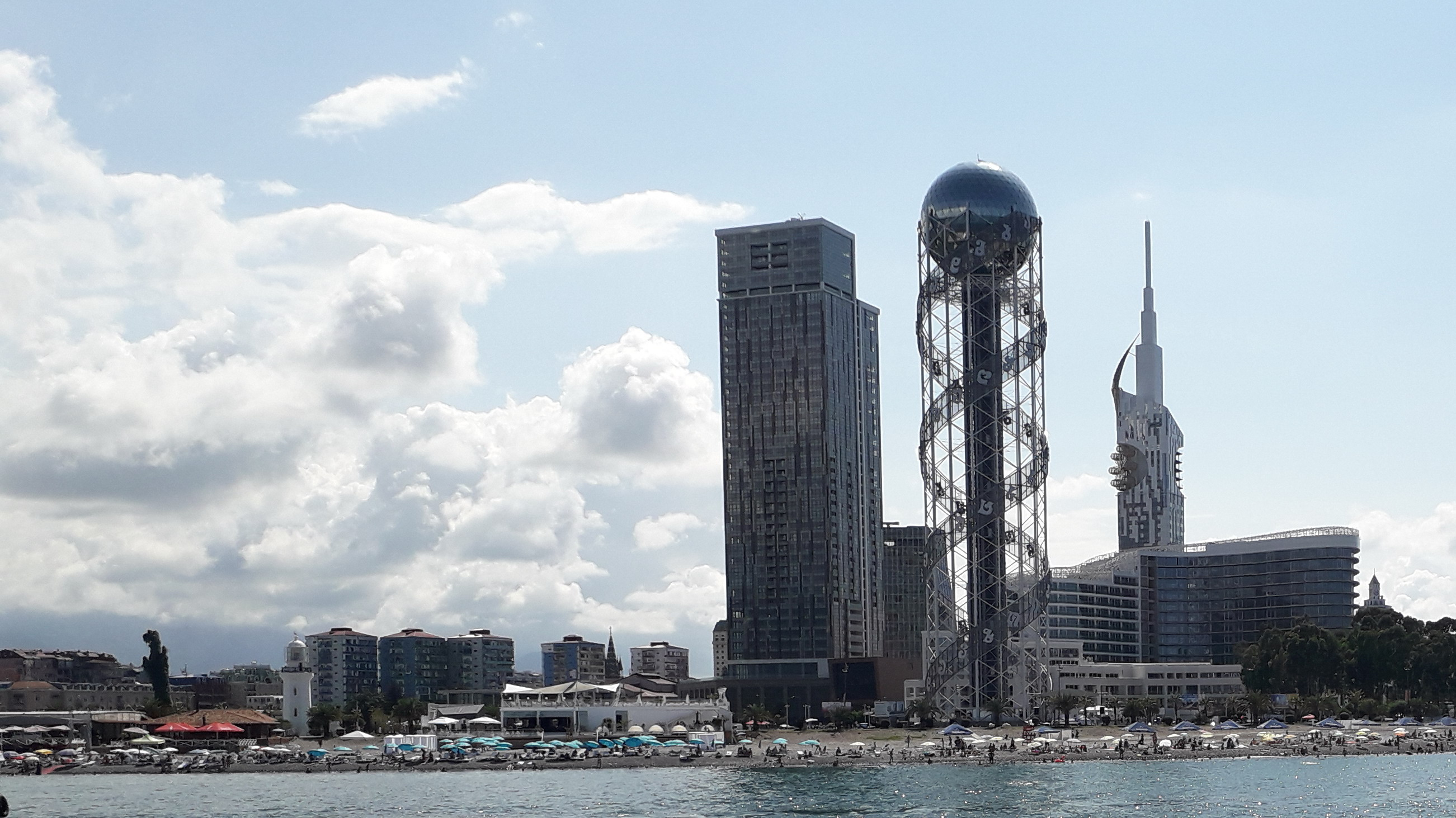
The skyline of Batumi

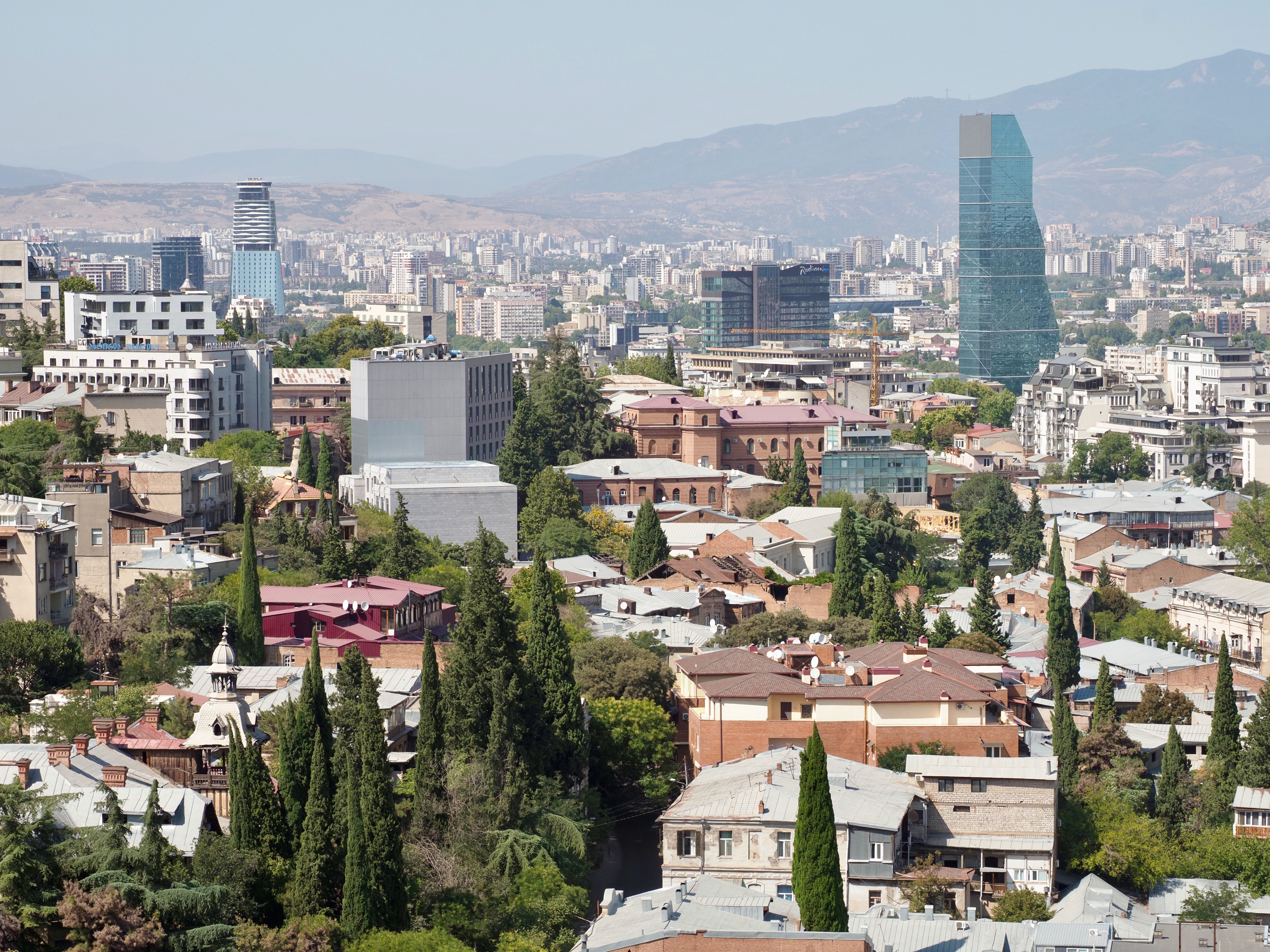
The skyline of Tbilisi

This is a list of the tallest buildings in the country of Georgia. Most of Georgia's tallest buildings are located in the seaside city of Batumi, including Alliance Centropolis Tower C, which stands at 210 meters and is the tallest building in the country to have topped out. The Axis Towers, standing at 147 meters, are the tallest buildings in Tbilisi. The “Year” column indicates the year in which each building was completed.

== Tallest buildings in Georgia ==
Was the tallest building in Georgia upon completion
Indicates buildings that have been topped out but not yet completed

Rank	Name	Image	Height m (ft)	Floors	Year	City	Ref.
1	Alliance Centropolis Tower C		210 m (690 ft)	56	2028	Batumi	
2	Batumi Technological University Tower		200 m (660 ft)	35	2012	Batumi	
3	Alliance Privilege		190 m (620 ft)	54	2022	Batumi	
4	Azure Tower		172 m (564 ft)	47	2024	Batumi	
5	Porta Batumi Tower		164 m (538 ft)	43	2017	Batumi	
6=	Orbi City A		160 m (520 ft)	55	2019	Batumi	
6=	Orbi City C		160 m (520 ft)	55	2019	Batumi	
6=	Orbi City D		160 m (520 ft)	55	2024	Batumi	
7=	Axis Tower 1		147 m (482 ft)	37	2019	Tbilisi	
7=	Axis Tower 2		147 m (482 ft)	37	2019	Tbilisi	
8	Alliance Highline 1		141 m (463 ft)	42	2023	Tbilisi	
9	Alliance Palace		132 m (433 ft)	41	2019	Batumi	
10=	Biltmore Hotel Tbilisi		130 m (430 ft)	32	2016	Tbilisi	
10=	Orbi Sea Central Tower		130 m (430 ft)	34	2015	Batumi	
10=	Alphabetic Tower		130 m (430 ft)	5	2011	Batumi	
11=	Black Sea Tower A		125 m (410 ft)	40	2021	Batumi	
11=	Black Sea Tower B		125 m (410 ft)	40	2021	Batumi	
12	Sheraton Batumi Hotel		118 m (387 ft)	22	2010	Batumi	
13=	Orbi Beach Tower		117 m (384 ft)	39	2019	Batumi	
13=	Alliance Highline 2		117 m (384 ft)	35	2023	Tbilisi	
14=	New Wave Hotel		110 m (360 ft)	33	2018	Batumi	
14=	King David Residences & Business Center		110 m (360 ft)	32	2017	Tbilisi	
15=	Orbi Sea East Tower		109 m (358 ft)	25	2015	Batumi	
15=	Orbi Sea West Tower		109 m (358 ft)	25	2015	Batumi	

== Tallest buildings under construction ==
Rank	Name	Height m (ft)	Floors	Estimated Completion	City	Notes	Ref.
1	Khashuri tower	405 m (1,329 ft)	100	2032	Khashuri		
2	World trade center khashuri	283 m (928 ft)	74	2037	Khashuri		
3	VR Vake Skyview Tower	260 m (850 ft)	70	2029	Tbilisi	Will become the tallest building in Georgia when completed.	
4	Trump tower khashuri	260 m (850 ft)	62	2030	Khashuri		
5	Cube Tower	260 m (850 ft)	42	2027	Batumi		
6	Alliance Centropolis Tower B	228 m (748 ft)	62	2028	Batumi		
7	Alliance Centropolis Tower A	210 m (690 ft)	56	2028	Batumi		
8	Orbi Continental Tower B	180 m (590 ft)	55	TBA	Batumi		
9	Panorama	140 m (460 ft)	40	TBA	Batumi		
10	Orbi Continental Tower A	130 m (430 ft)	38	TBA	Batumi		
11	Swissôtel Cubic Tower	120 m (390 ft)	30	TBA	Batumi	Currently on hold.	

== Tallest buildings approved or proposed ==
Rank	Name	Height m (ft)	Floors	Estimated Completion	City	Status	Ref.
1	Gala Tower	275 m (902 ft)	75	TBA	Batumi	Proposed	
2	West Tower 1	262 m (860 ft)	72	TBA	Batumi	Approved	
3	Ad Astra Tower	250 m (820 ft)	45	TBA	Batumi	Proposed	
4	Ritz Carlton	200 m (660 ft)	50	TBA	Batumi	Approved	
5	Rustaveli 44	180 m (590 ft)	61	TBA	Batumi	Approved	
6	West Tower 2	180 m (590 ft)	50	TBA	Batumi	Approved	
7	Trump Tower	170 m (560 ft)	47	TBA	Batumi	Proposed	
8	Batumi Riviera	130 m (430 ft)	42	TBA	Batumi	Approved	
9	5 Pirosmani	103 m (338 ft)	35	TBA	Batumi	Proposed	
