= Azure Tower =

- ბაბილონის კოშკი
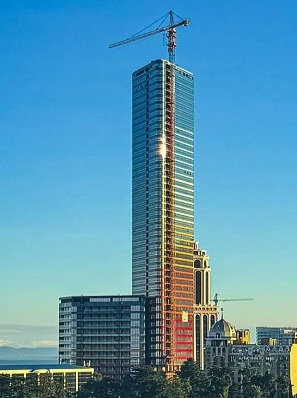
- The tower under construction in April 2024

- Location within Georgia

General information
- Status: Completed
- Type: Residential
- Location: Batumi, Georgia
- Coordinates: 41.6503°N 41.6295°E
- Construction started: April 2013
- Completed: June 2024

Height
- Architectural: 171.7 m (563 ft)

Technical details
- Floor count: 47

Design and construction
- Architect: Tago Architects

Website
- polides.com/project/azure-tower-interior-design/

Azure Tower, also known as Babillon Tower (Georgian: ბაბილონის კოშკი) is a residential skyscraper in Batumi, Georgia. Standing at 171.7 m (563 ft) tall with 47 floors, it is the tallest residential building in Georgia. The tower forms part of Batumi’s recent wave of high-rise development, which has contributed to the city’s growing tourism and real estate sectors.

Construction of the project was overseen by Omer Ilknur and was originally planned to include a four-star hotel, casino, residences, social facilities, retail spaces, offices, cafés, restaurants, and bars.

The project experienced significant delays. Although the tower was initially scheduled for completion in 2015, the original developer, TAM GEO LLC, failed to meet its contractual obligations. In May 2019, the Government of Georgia sold the unfinished multi-story building to MC Construction through an online auction. The auction opened at 24.5 million GEL, approximately 33% lower than the starting price of a previous unsuccessful auction. Construction was later resumed and ultimately completed in June 2024.

== Economic and social impact ==
The Azure Tower project has been described by local media as part of a broader wave of investment in Batumi’s skyline during the 2010s and 2020s. The city has sought to position itself as a Black Sea tourism hub, encouraging large-scale developments such as luxury hotels, casinos, and high-rise residential buildings. Proponents have argued that these projects could boost employment and international tourism in the Adjara region.

Critics, however, have raised concerns about overdevelopment, noting that several high-rise projects in Batumi have been delayed or left incomplete. Additional criticism has focused on the concentration of investment in luxury real estate, while the availability of affordable housing in the city has remained limited.

== Current status and architectural design ==
The Azure Tower is now completed, following a prolonged period of delays and ownership changes. Earlier entries in specialized skyscraper databases, including SKYDB, had listed the project’s status as “interrupted” and described it as a modern-style hotel skyscraper located at 30 Rustaveli Avenue in Batumi. These listings reflected the tower’s stalled condition during the late 2010s and early 2020s, when construction activity was limited and the structural project remained unfinished.

Construction was later resumed under MC Construction, and visual documentation published by Korter confirmed sustained progress prior to completion. The overall development, marketed under the Azure name, consists of two towers, one with 15 floors and the other with 47 floors, forming a mixed-use complex in central Batumi.

Design and project information has varied across sources. The Council on Tall Buildings and Urban Habitat (CTBUH) lists the project under the names "Azure Tower Hotel" and "Azure Tower", and associates part of the complex with hotel use. Final completion of the main tower was achieved in June 2024, after which it became the tallest residential building in Georgia.

== See also ==
- List of tallest buildings in Georgia (country)
