= Alliance Group (Georgia) =

Georgian real estate developer

- Industry: Real estate development, Hotel Real Estate
- Founded: 2005; 21 years ago
- Founder: Giorgi Bitsadze
- Headquarters: Batumi, Georgia
- Key people: Giorgi Bitsadze (Founder); Akaki Songulia (Co-Founder and General Director)
- Website: www.invest.alliance.ge

Alliance Group is a Georgian real estate developer founded in 2005 by Giorgi Bitsadze. Its activities include residential and mixed-use properties, including developments with hotel and commercial components. Several of its developments combine residential apartments with internationally branded hotels.

== History ==
Alliance Group was established in 2005 and initially focused on residential construction in Batumi. In 2015, Alliance Group began working with Marriott International on Alliance Palace, a mixed-use development in Batumi combining privately owned apartments with a Courtyard by Marriott hotel.

In February 2018, Alliance Group and Marriott International signed a franchise agreement for a Marriott hotel in Alliance Privilege, a mixed-use tower planned on Rustaveli Avenue near the Batumi Boulevard.

In 2020, Alliance Group announced Alliance Centropolis, a mixed-use development in Batumi planned to include hotel, residential, office, retail and exhibition space. In January 2021, Hyatt announced the development of a 180-room Hyatt Centric hotel at the site under a management agreement with Alliance Group. Construction was formally launched in March 2021. The development also included a World Trade Center with business and exhibition facilities.

In June 2023, Aimbridge Hospitality EMEA signed an agreement to manage the aparthotel component of Alliance Palace, marking the operator's entry into the Georgian market.

In 2023, Alliance Group announced Alliance Renaissance, a sports and wellness-oriented development in Kobuleti. The plans consisted of three towers linked by a shared podium and a separate multi-storey sports and wellness building.

In February 2024, Alliance Group signed a memorandum with Wyndham Hotels & Resorts and Aimbridge Hospitality EMEA concerning the third tower of Alliance Highline in Tbilisi. Under the agreement, the tower was designated Wyndham Grand Residences Tbilisi, while Aimbridge was appointed to manage the branded residences.

== Operations ==
Alliance Group develops hotel-type and mixed-use properties incorporating hotels, apartments and commercial premises. Its developments are located mainly in Batumi, Tbilisi and Georgian resort areas.

Some developments operate as aparthotels, with individually owned apartments forming part of a property that also includes hotel and rental-management services.

The Italian architecture and interior design firm Studio D73 worked on the interiors of Alliance Palace and Alliance Highline.

Depending on the development, the projects have involved franchise or management agreements with Marriott International, Wyndham Hotels & Resorts, Hyatt, Aimbridge Hospitality and others.

== Projects ==
=== Alliance Palace ===
The 41-storey Alliance Palace in Batumi

Alliance Palace is a functioning 41-storey mixed-use building in Batumi containing a Courtyard by Marriott hotel and privately owned apartments.

In June 2023, Aimbridge Hospitality EMEA assumed management of the building's aparthotel component.

=== Alliance Privilege ===
Alliance Privilege on Rustaveli Avenue, Batumi

Alliance Privilege is a 54-storey mixed-use building on Rustaveli Avenue in Batumi. Under the franchise agreement announced in 2018, the lower part of the tower was allocated to a Marriott hotel and the upper floors to hotel-type apartments.

=== Alliance Highline ===
Alliance Highline is a three-tower mixed-use development in Tbilisi. Its third tower was initially associated with Wyndham Hotels & Resorts and was later designated Wyndham Grand Residences Tbilisi under the 2024 agreement between Alliance Group, Wyndham and Aimbridge Hospitality EMEA.

=== Alliance Centropolis ===
Alliance Centropolis is a three-tower mixed-use development under construction on Batumi's seaside boulevard. The development includes hotel-type apartments, a Hyatt Centric hotel, a World Trade Center with exhibition spaces, and 24 facilities.

=== Alliance Renaissance ===
Alliance Renaissance is a mixed-use development under construction in Kobuleti. Announced in 2023, it consists of three towers connected by a shared podium and a separate sports and wellness building. The development is located on the Black Sea coast. It is planned to include more than 25 sports, wellness and recreational spaces, including a wellness centre, mineral spa facilities, indoor surfing and rock climbing.

== Recognition ==
In 2017, Alliance Palace and Alliance Highline received European Property Awards in the hotel-type high-rise and mixed-use architecture categories. Alliance Palace later received the Mixed-use Project of the Year award at the 2018 Eastern European Real Estate Awards.
