= Aimbridge Hospitality =

American hotel management company

- Industry: Hotel Management
- Founded: 2008; 18 years ago
- Founder: Dave Johnson
- Headquarters: Plano, Texas, United States
- Number of locations: 1,100 (2025)
- Area served: Worldwide
- Key people: Craig S. Smith (Chief Executive Officer)
- Website: aimbridgehospitality.com

Aimbridge Hospitality is an American third-party hotel management company that manages over 1,100 hotels globally.

As of 2021, Aimbridge held 1,218 properties in its portfolio with a combined 171,019 rooms across all 50 states in the United States and 23 other countries.

== History ==
The company was originally founded by Dave Johnson in 2003 with eight hotels.

The company made a number of acquisitions over the years, these included the acquisitions of:

- 2015 Evolution Hospitality
- 2016 Pillar Hotels and Resorts
- 2017 ONE Lodging Management
- 2017 TMI Hospitality
- 2019 merger with Interstate Hotels and Resorts
- 2021 of Prism Hotels & Resort
- 2021 Grupo Hotelero Prisma (MX)
- 2022 Terrapin Hospitality

In 2025, the company entered into a restructuring support agreement with its first and second tier lenders to help it converting more than $1.1 billion in debt to equity. It also refocused on operations after losing 23% of their properties.

== Operations ==
Aimbridge operates through four operating divisions: Aimbridge Full Service, Aimbridge Select Service, Aimbridge EMEA, and Aimbridge LATAM.

Aimbridge Full Service is responsible for managing all full-service branded and independent hotels and resorts in its portfolio. Aimbridge Select Service is responsible for managing select service, economy, and extended stay verticals of its portfolio. Aimbridge EMEA is responsible for their operations within the United Kingdom, Ireland, and Europe. Aimbridge LATAM is responsible for their operations within Latin America.
