= Alphabetic Tower =

Cultural tower in Bitumi, Georgia

- ანბანის კოშკი
- The tower in 2012
- Interactive map of the Alphabetic Tower area

General information
- Location: Batumi, Georgia
- Coordinates: 41.65594°N 41.63944°E
- Construction started: October 2010
- Inaugurated: December 2011
- Cost: $65 million
- Owner: Batumi City Assembly

Height
- Height: 130 m (430 ft)

Dimensions
- Diameter: 31 m (102 ft)

Technical details
- Structural system: All-Steel
- Floor count: 5
- Floor area: 2,200 m^{2} (23,700 sq ft)

Design and construction
- Architecture firm: CMD Ingenieros
- Structural engineer: Alberto Domingo

The Alphabetic Tower (Georgian: ანბანის კოშკი, romanized: anbanis k'oshk'i) is a 130-meter-high structure in Batumi, Georgia. The tower symbolizes the uniqueness of the Georgian alphabet and people. The structure combines the design of DNA, in its familiar double helix pattern. Two helix bands rise up the tower holding 33 letters of the Georgian alphabet, each 4 meters tall and made of aluminium.

In the middle of the building is an exposed elevator shaft leading to the very top of the building, in the crown of the structure, where a colossal silver ball is located.

== Development ==
The Alphabetic Tower was built by the Spanish company CMD Domingo y Lázaro Ingenieros (Alberto Domingo Cabo and Carlos Lázaro). Construction began on 10 October 2010, with the exterior of the structure completed in December 2011. The building cost $65 million to build.

=== Concept ===
The structure of DNA, which conctitutes the concept of the building.

The Georgian alphabet is one of the expressions of the uniqueness of the Georgian people. The inspiration for the tower’s design comes from the structure of DNA, which contains the genetic code. DNA is often compared to the unity of blueprints; other DNA sequences have a structural purpose or are involved in regulating the use of this genetic information. Thus, the tower conveys the uniqueness of the Georgian people with its original Georgian script. Two spiral lines, along with 33 letters of the 4-meter-high aluminum Mkhedruli script, are stretched around the tower. The term "Mkhedruli" is a later one and is first attested in the 14th century. The word "Mkhedruli" is used in the monuments of this period in the opposite meaning of "khutsuri", as a secular script. The beauty of these symbols, projected on a major scale and not previously reflected in the design of any tower, demonstrates the individuality of an open and hospitable country proud of its cultural heritage.

== Structure ==
=== Construction system ===
The tower is composed of eleven modules of cantilever trusses of steel tubes, which make up two bodies: the interior containing the communication core, panoramic elevators, and stairs; and the exterior, which supports the whole structure and defines the skin with the big characters. Each of the 10.8 m cores is bonded by diaphragms in a star pattern. At the top stands a glass sphere made of triangle elements fixed over steel profiles and sealed. The sphere consists of a hollow circular section structure.

This light space hosts several rooms, distributed on different floors within the sphere. The first floor is called the transfer floor. It can be reached by the two main panoramic lifts. From the transfer floor you may reach other lifts which serve the other floors.

The second floor hosts a TV studio, next to the kitchen and the restaurant which is on the third floor, designed like a revolving ring. This ring, which goes around 360 degrees in an hour, offers visitors a panoramic view of the city and the Black Sea while they are enjoying their meal. The fourth floor has been conceived as an observatory deck to enjoy the unique views from the Alphabetic Tower. This floor leads to the fifth one, which is designed to allow visitors to see how the tuned mass damper works. The tuned mass damper is a fifty-ton device mounted in structures to reduce the amplitude of mechanical vibrations.

=== Area and use ===
The tower's functional load is mostly placed in the sphere. After ascending the tower sphere by panoramic elevators built into the internal grid structure (cylinder), we first encounter a visitor exchange point, where visitors transfer from the panoramic elevators to internal elevators in order to distribute the flow of visitors in the sphere. The second floor of the sphere contains two important elements: a kitchen serving the restaurant and a television studio.

The panoramic restaurant is located on the third floor, which coincides with the equatorial level of the sphere. Together with the dining area on the rotating platform, the restaurant can accommodate 100 people and another 25 in the café area. The lighting system creates a calm and warm atmosphere, although it has been mainly adjusted to eliminate reflections on the surface of the sphere at night.

The fourth floor houses the observatory, with an area of 250 m² and a capacity of 200 people. Here, visitors can experience the views of Batumi and the Black Sea coast. It is on the fourth floor that it is possible to see the tower's guard, the pendulum: during strong winds, the movement of this large mass is noticeable.

=== Design and materials ===
The two spiral lines were made of a lightweight, expanded metal material. This is an aluminum sheet covered with thin waves that create a doubling effect, this effect depending on the distance from the tower. It also creates very little wind resistance.

Also made of aluminum, the letters of the alphabet have LED structures built into them, which mimic the outlines of the letters. The letters were equipped with this feature at the factory and attached to two spiral lines on the ground.

The tower has five elevators for visitors, which travel from the ground to the various levels of the sphere. The tower's elevators are divided into two systems: two panoramic elevators travel from the ground to the visitor exchange point, and two internal elevators from the visitor exchange point to the other levels of the sphere. This system was considered the best for managing visitor flows. For cargo and service personnel, there is also a service elevator from the ground level to the restaurant level.

At the restaurant level, the floor rotates on 40 wheels, 20 of which are motorized, and the restaurant completes one circle in exactly 60 minutes. The floors do not have direct contact with the glass sphere; the designers avoided joints and structural obstacles, so that visitors feel like they are in a large bubble inside the sphere. The exception is the kitchen, which is more closed off than other areas to prevent the spread of various smells into the restaurant area. Providing water and electrical services proved to be a challenge for the designers, as the height of the tower prevented the operation of the pumping and cleaning mechanisms. These services are connected to the sphere by two small conduit networks located next to the service elevator.

== Current condition ==
Since the building was constructed, it has virtually remained forsaken. As of 2014, it was known that the elevator was out of order and hundreds of dead birds could be found on the floors, though the building itself was still electrified and looked comparably new. In May 2015, Batumi City Hall decided to lease the 130m-tall Alphabet Tower to an unnamed Spanish company for the next 20 years. Batumi City Hall used to spend 700,000 GEL per year on the tower's maintenance. As of 2017, the restaurant is open for visitors.

== See also ==
- List of tallest buildings in Georgia (country)

== Gallery ==
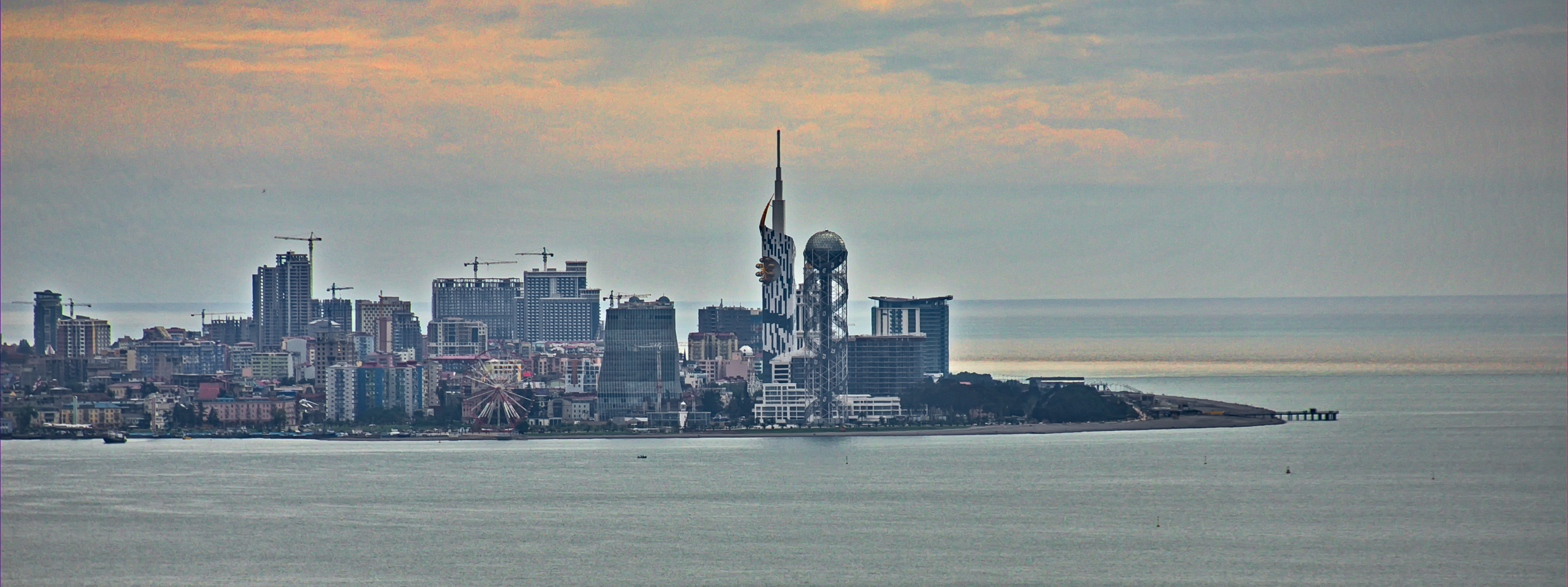

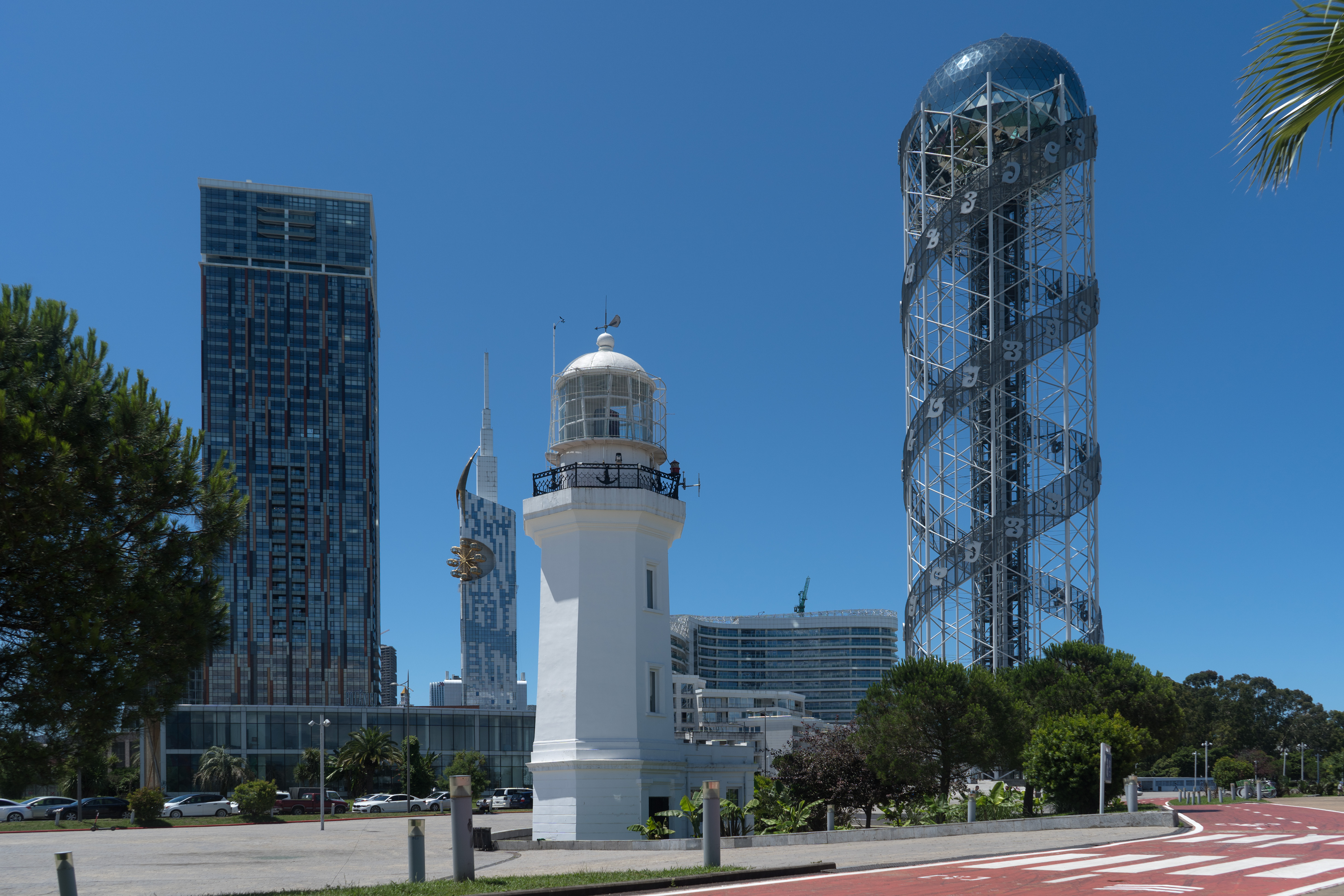

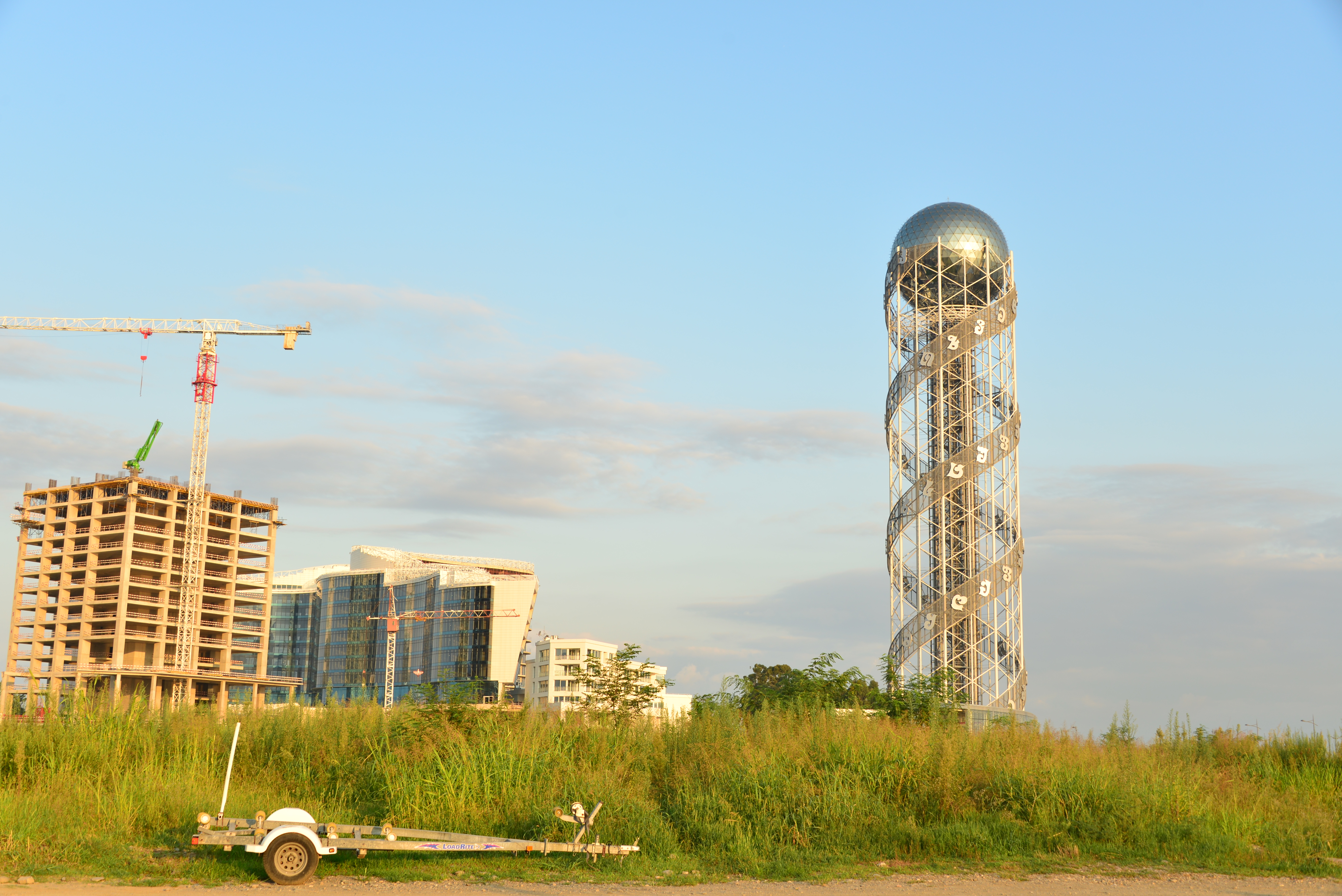
