= British Academy Television Craft Award for Best Costume Design =

Award for technical achievements in TV

BAFTA Television Craft Award
- Country: United Kingdom
- Presented by: British Academy of Film and Television Arts
- First award: 1978
- Currently held by: Maja Meschede for A Thousand Blows (2026)
- Website: http://www.bafta.org/

The BAFTA Television Craft Award for Best Costume Design is one of the categories presented by the British Academy of Film and Television Arts (BAFTA) within the British Academy Television Craft Awards, the craft awards were established in 2000 with their own, separate ceremony as a way to spotlight technical achievements, without being overshadowed by the main production categories. It was first awarded in 1978.

According to the BAFTA website, for a programme to be eligible to this category, it "should contain a significant amount of original design."

== Winners and nominees ==
=== 1970s ===
Year	Title	Recipient(s)
1978	Hard Times	Esther Dean
1978	The Duchess of Duke Street	Betty Aldiss
1978	She Fell Among Thieves	John Bloomfield
1978	Raffles/Sister Dora	Brian Castle
1978	Anna Karenina	Joan Ellacott
1978	Jesus of Nazareth	Marcel Escoffieri, Enrico Sabbatini
1978	Machbeth	Raymond Hughes
1978	Eustace and Hilda	Barbara Lane
1978	Poldark	Penny Lowe
1978	Rock Follies of '77	Caroline Middleton, Jennie Tate
1978	Holding On	Alyson Ritchie
1978	Love for Lydia	May Tapley, Vangie Harrison
1978	Three Weeks	Diana Thurley
1978	The Ambassadors	Juanita Waterson
1979	Edward & Mrs. Simpson	Diana Thurley, Jennie Tate
1979	The One and Only Phyllis Dixey	Martin Baugh
1979	Pennies from Heaven	John Peacock
1979	Lillie	Frances Tempest, Linda Mattock

=== 1980s ===
Year	Title	Recipient(s)
1980	Testament of Youth	Prue Handley
1980	Prince Regent	Raymond Hughes
1980	Tinker Tailor Soldier Spy	Joyce Mortlock
1980	Stanley Baxter on Television	Clive Stuart
1981	Thérèse Raquin	Reg Samuel
1981	Worzel Gummidge	Michael Baldwin
1981	Pride and Prejudice	Joan Ellacott
1981	Cream in My Coffee	Sue Formston
1982	Brideshead Revisited	Jane Robinson
1982	The Borgias	Mike Burdle
1982	Winston Churchill: The Wilderness Years	Evangeline Harrison
1982	Pygmalion	Elizabeth Waller
1983	Nicholas Nickleby	John Napier
1983	The Woman in White	Barbara Kronig
1983	Nancy Astor	Joyce Mortlock
1983	Barchester Chronicles	Juanita Waterson
1984	An Englishman Abroad/The Tale of Beatrix Potter	Amy Roberts
1984	Mansfield Park	Ian Adley
1984	King Lear	Tanya Moiseiwitsch
1984	Reilly, Ace of Spies	Elizabeth Waller
1985	The Jewel in the Crown	Esther Dean, Diane Holmes
1985	The Far Pavilions	Raymond Hughes
1985	Threads	Sally Nieper
1985	Tenko	Andrew Rose
1986	Bleak House	Michael Burdle
1986	Tender is the Night	Barbara Kidd
1986	Silas Marner	Anushia Nieradzik
1986	Mapp and Lucia	Frances Tempest
1987	Bluebell	Verity Lewis, Janet Powell
1987	Lost Empires	Michael Cocks
1987	The Monocled Mutineer	Charlotte Holdich
1987	The Life and Loves of a She-Devil	Joyce Mortlock
1987	The Singing Detective	Hazel Pethig, John Peacock
1987	Hotel Du Lac	Rita Reekie
1988	Fortunes of War	Christine Rawlins
1988	Vanity Fair	Joyce Hawkins
1988	Porterhouse Blue	Lindy Hemming
1988	Tutti Frutti	Delphine Roche-Gordon
1989	The Storyteller	Ann Hollowood
1989	Tumbledown	Michael Burdle
1989	Christabel	Anushia Nieradzik
1989	The Chronicles of Narnia	Judy Pepperdine

=== 1990s ===
Year	Title	Recipient(s)	Broadcaster
1990	Agatha Christie's Poirot' (for "Episodes 2,4,7,8 & 10")	Linda Mattock	ITV
1990	The Chronicles of Narnia	Judy Pepperdine	BBC
1990	Precious Bane	Michael Burdle	BBC
1990	The Ginger Tree	Michael Burdle	BBC One
1990	Agatha Christie's Poirot (for "Episodes 1,3,5,6 & 9")	Sue Thomson	ITV
1991	Portrait of a Marriage	Dinah Collin	BBC Two
1991	Beatrix: The Early Life of Beatrix Potter	David Beaton	BBC
1991	Oranges Are Not the Only Fruit	Les Lansdown	BBC Two
1991	Agatha Christie’s Poirot	Linda Mattock, Sharon Lewis	ITV
1992	The House of Eliott	Joan Wadge	BBC One
1992	Agatha Christie's Poirot (for "Programmes 1,4,5,9 & 10")	Elizabeth Waller	ITV
1992	Agatha Christie's Poirot (for "Programmes 2,3,6,7 & 8")	Robin Fraser-Paye	ITV
1992	Jim Henson's Greek Myths	Ann Hollowood, Polly Smith	Channel 4
1992	Clarissa	Ken Trew	BBC
1993	The Camomile Lawn	Elizabeth Waller	Channel 4
1993	Absolutely Fabulous	Sarah Burns, Philip Lester	BBC Two
1993	Jeeves and Wooster	Dany Everett	ITV
1993	Miss Marple: The Mirror Crack'd from Side to Side	Judy Pepperdine	BBC One
1994	Mr Wroe's Virgins	Susannah Buxton	BBC Two
1994	Doctor Finlay	Leigh Bellis	ITV
1994	The Buddha of Suburbia	Alexandra Byrne	BBC Two
1994	Armistead Maupin’s Tales of the City	Molly Maginnis	Channel 4
1995	Martin Chuzzlewit	Jeremy Turner	BBC Two
1995	The Rector's Wife	Barbara Kidd	Channel 4
1995	Measure for Measure	Lyn Avery	BBC Two
1995	Middlemarch	Anushia Nieradzik	BBC Two
1996	Persuasion	Alexandra Byrne	BBC Two
1996	The Hanging Gale	Howard Burden	BBC One
1996	Pride and Prejudice	Dinah Collin	BBC One
1996	Performance: Henry IV	Joan Wadge	BBC Two
1997	Gulliver's Travels	Shirley Russell	Channel 4
1997	The Fortunes and Misfortunes of Moll Flanders	Trisha Biggar	ITV
1997	The Tenant of Wildfell Hall	Rosalind Ebbutt	BBC One
1997	Our Friends in the North	James Keast	BBC Two
1998	Tom Jones	Rosalind Ebbutt	BBC One
1998	A Dance to the Music of Time	Dany Everett, Barbara Kidd	Channel 4
1998	The Mill on the Floss	Jill Taylor	BBC
1998	The Woman in White	Odile Dicks-Mireaux	BBC One
1999	A Respectable Trade	Frances Tempest	BBC
1999	Hornblower: The Even Chance	John Mollo	ITV
1999	Vanity Fair	Rosalind Ebbutt	BBC One
1999	Our Mutual Friend	Mike O’Neill	BBC Two

=== 2000s ===
Year	Title	Recipient(s)	Broadcaster
2000	Great Expectations	Odile Dicks-Mireaux	BBC Two
2000	Oliver Twist	Rosalind Ebbutt	ITV
2000	The League of Gentlemen	Yves Barre	BBC Two
2000	All the King’s Men	Howard Burden	BBC One
2001	The League of Gentlemen	Yves Barre	BBC Two
2001	Longitude	Shirley Russell	Channel 4
2001	Gormenghast	Odile Dicks-Mireaux	BBC Two
2001	Madame Bovary	Anushia Nieradzik	BBC Two
2002	The Life and Adventures of Nicholas Nickleby	Barbara Kidd	Channel 4
2002	Love in a Cold Climate	Mike O'Neill	BBC One
2002	The Cazalets	Frances Tempest	BBC One
2002	Othello	Les Lansdown	ITV
2003	Shackleton	Shirley Russell	Channel 4
2003	The Gathering Storm	Jenny Beavan	BBC Two
2003	Daniel Deronda	Mike O’Neill	BBC One
2003	Dr Zhivago	Annie Symons	ITV
2004	Charles II: The Power and the Passion	Mike O'Neill	BBC One
2004	Little Britain	Annie Hardinge	BBC Three
2004	The Mayor of Casterbridge	Lyn Avery	BBC
2004	The Canterbury Tales: The Wife of Bath	Sammy Sheldon	BBC One
2005	The Long Firm	James Keast	BBC Two
2005	Little Britain	Annie Hardinge	BBC Three
2005	Strictly Come Dancing	Su Judd	BBC One
2005	Sex Traffic	Anushia Nieradzik	Channel 4
2006	Bleak House	Andrea Galer	BBC One
2006	To the Ends of the Earth	Rosalind Ebbutt	BBC Two
2006	The Queen's Sister	James Keast	Channel 4
2006	Elizabeth I	Mike O'Neill	Channel 4
2007	The Virgin Queen	Amy Roberts	BBC One
2007	A Harlot's Progress	David Blight	Channel 4
2007	Fear of Fanny	Emma Fryer	BBC Four
2007	The Ruby in the Smoke	James Keast	BBC One
2008	Oliver Twist	Amy Roberts	BBC One
2008	Cranford	Jenny Beavan	BBC One
2008	Fanny Hill	Lucinda Wright	BBC Four
2008	Miss Marie Lloyd: Queen of The Music Hall	Lucinda Wright	BBC Four
2009	The Devil's Whore	Michele Clapton	Channel 4
2009	House of Saddam	Alexandra Caulfield	BBC Two
2009	In Love with Barbara	Natalie Humphries	BBC Four
2009	Little Dorrit	Barbara Kidd	BBC One

=== 2010s ===
Year	Title	Recipient(s)	Broadcaster
2010	Red Riding 1974	Natalie Ward	Channel 4
2010	An Englishman in New York	Joey Attawia	ITV
2010	Cranford	Jenny Beavan	BBC One
2010	Desperate Romantics	James Keast	BBC Two
2011	Worried About the Boy	Annie Symons	BBC Two
2011	Any Human Heart	Charlotte Holdich	Channel 4
2011	This Is England '86	Charlotte Walter	Channel 4
2011	Eric and Ernie	Joanna Eatwell	BBC Two
2012	Birdsong	Charlotte Walter	BBC One
2012	Downton Abbey	Susannah Buxton	ITV
2012	The Mystery of Edwin Drood	James Keast	BBC Two
2012	Call the Midwife	Amy Roberts	BBC One
2013	Parade's End	Sheena Napier	BBC Two
2013	Mrs Biggs	Amy Roberts	ITV
2013	Richard II (The Hollow Crown)	Odile Dicks-Mireaux	BBC Two
2013	Ripper Street	Lorna Marie Mugan	BBC One
2014	Downton Abbey	Caroline McCall	ITV
2014	An Adventure in Space and Time	Suzanne Cave	BBC Two
2014	Da Vinci's Demons	Annie Symons	Fox
2014	The Suspicions of Mr Whicher: The Murder in Angel Lane	Lucinda Wright	ITV
2015	The Musketeers	Phoebe de Gaye	BBC One
2015	Cilla	Amy Roberts	ITV
2015	Penny Dreadful	Gabriella Pescucci	Sky Atlantic
2015	Strictly Come Dancing	Vicky Gill	BBC One
2016	The Dresser	Fotini Dimou	BBC Two
2016	Jonathan Strange & Mr Norrell	Barbara Kidd	BBC One
2016	Poldark	Marianne Agertoft	BBC One
2016	Wolf Hall	Joanna Eatwell	BBC Two
2017	The Crown	Michele Clapton	Netflix
2017	The Durrells	Charlotte Holdich	ITV
2017	The Hollow Crown	Nigel Egerton	BBC Two
2017	San Junipero (Black Mirror)	Susie Coulthard	Netflix
2018	Game of Thrones	Michele Clapton	HBO
2018	Peaky Blinders	Alison McCosh	BBC Two
2018	The Crown	Jane Petrie	Netflix
2018	Taboo	Joanna Eatwell	BBC One
2019	A Very English Scandal	Suzanne Cave	BBC One
2019	The City and The City	Marianne Agertoft	BBC Two
2019	The Long Song	Charlotte Holdich	BBC One
2019	Killing Eve	Phoebe de Gaye	BBC One

=== 2020s ===
Year	Title	Recipient(s)	Broadcaster
2020	Chernobyl	Odile Dicks-Mireaux	Sky Atlantic
2020	His Dark Materials	Caroline McCall	BBC One
2020	Beecham House	Joanna Eatwell	ITV
2020	Game of Thrones	Michele Clapton	HBO/Sky Atlantic
2021	Small Axe	Jacqueline Durran	BBC One
2021	Sex Education	Rosa Dias	Netflix
2021	Belgravia	James Keast	Epix/ITV
2021	The Crown	Amy Roberts	Netflix
2022	We Are Lady Parts	PC Williams	Channel 4
2022	The Serpent (for "Episode 1")	Adam Howe	BBC One
2022	The Pursuit of Love	Sinéad Kidao	BBC One
2022	A Very British Scandal	Ian Fulcher	BBC One
2023	The Essex Serpent	Jane Petrie	Apple TV+
2023	The Crown	Amy Roberts	Netflix
2023	Don't Hug Me I'm Scared	Becky Sloan, Joe Pelling	Channel 4
2023	The English	Phoebe de Gaye	BBC Two
2024	The Great	Sharon Long	Lionsgate+
2024	The Crown (for "Ritz")	Amy Roberts	Netflix
2024	Black Mirror: "Demon 79"	Matthew Price	Netflix
2024	Silo	Charlotte Morris	Apple TV+
2025	Eric	Suzanne Cave	Netflix
2025	Mary & George	Annie Symons, Jason Airey	Sky Atlantic
2025	The Tattooist of Auschwitz	Ján Kocman	Sky Atlantic
2025	Black Doves	Ian Fulcher	Netflix
2026	A Thousand Blows	Maja Meschede	Disney+
2026	Andor	Michael Wilkinson	Disney+
2026	Lockerbie: A Search for Truth	Rhona Russell	Sky Atlantic
2026	Trespasses	Emma O'Loughlin	Channel 4

== See also ==
- Primetime Emmy Award for Outstanding Contemporary Costumes
- Primetime Emmy Award for Outstanding Fantasy/Sci-Fi Costumes
- Primetime Emmy Award for Outstanding Period Costumes
