= Essex Book Festival =

Literary festival in Essex, United Kingdom

The Essex Book Festival is a literary festival that has been held across the county of Essex, United Kingdom, annually since March 1999. The festival aims to provide an opportunity for writers and the public to meet. The festival has been the host of numerous authors of international acclaim but is mainly focused on local and British writers and critics. The events of the festival are generally held in libraries, theatres and schools or colleges across Essex. The festival is organised by an independent charity, and is run out of the Centre for Creative Writing at the University of Essex. The festival's patron is Sarah Perry, author of The Essex Serpent.

== History ==
The festival was founded in March 1999 by Essex County Council, and has been held annually since then, with activities throughout the month of March. The festival became an independent charity in 2011, led by a board of trustees. It is based at the Centre for Creative Writing at the University of Essex’s Colchester campus. The festival's patron is Sarah Perry, author of The Essex Serpent.

The festival focuses on local and British writers and critics. The events of the festival are generally held in libraries, theatres and schools or colleges. Venues include the Electric Palace Cinema in Harwich, a restored oyster packing shed on Mersea Island, Chalkwell Hall, and Layer Marney Tower. The festival normally take place in March, but in 2025 the festival is due to be held between June and August, with more than 100 events held at more than 40 venues across Essex.

The 2020 festival was directed by Ros Green with the theme Brave New World.

The book festival also hosts educational and book-related events through the year. In January 2025 the book festival hosted a climate summit in Colchester with young activists and a climate refugee.
