= List of awards and nominations received by The Crown =

The Crown awards and nominations
Awards and nominations
Award	Wins	Nominations
AARP Movies for Grownups Awards	0	2
ACE Awards	0	1
AFI Awards	4	4
ASC Awards	3	4
ADG Awards	0	4
Artios Awards	1	2
ASCAP Film and Television Music Awards	0	1
AMPS Awards	0	3
Astra TV Awards	1	12
Astra Creative Arts TV Awards	1	4
AACTA International Awards	1	5
BAFTA Awards	1	21
BAFTA Craft Awards	4	27
BFDG Awards	1	1
British Screenwriters Awards	0	1
BSC Awards	1	6
BPG Awards	4	10
C21 Awards	1	9
Camerimage Festival Awards	0	1
CCE Awards	1	1
CAS Awards	0	2
CDG Awards	3	5
Critics Choice TV Awards	6	19
Dorian Awards	0	7
Edinburgh TV Awards	0	4
Empire Awards	1	3
EMA Awards	1	1
FMF Festival Awards	0	1
Glamour Awards	1	1
Gold Derby Awards	9	39
Golden Globe Awards	8	23
Golden Tomato Awards	1	1
Golden Trailer Awards	1	5
Guild of Music Supervisors Awards	0	1
HMUAHS Guild Awards	1	4
HCA Awards	3	6
HMM Awards	0	3
HPA Awards	2	3
Humanitas Prize Awards	0	1
IGN Summer Movie Awards	0	4
IOC Awards	7	16
IFT Awards	0	1
LMG Awards	2	4
Golden Reel Awards	1	5
MovieGuide Awards	1	7
MTV Movie & TV Awards	0	1
National Film Awards UK	0	5
National Television Awards UK	0	1
Newport Beach Film Festival Awards	1	1
OFTA Awards	17	47
Prémios Fantastic	1	1
Primetime Emmy Awards	11	38
Primetime Creative Arts Emmy Award	13	49
PGA Awards	1	4
Rose d’Or Awards	1	1
RTS Awards	3	8
Satellite Awards	3	11
SAG Awards	7	17
SDSA Awards	0	1
SCL Awards	0	1
Televisual Bulldog Awards	3	7
TRIC Awards	1	1
TCA Awards	1	6
VES Awards	1	3
World Soundtrack Awards	1	1
WGA Awards	1	7

Totals (Note: Certain award groups do not simply award one winner. They acknowledge several different recipients, have runners-up, and have third place. Since this is a specific recognition and is different from losing an award, runner-up mentions are considered wins in this award tally. For simplification and to avoid errors, each award in this list has been presumed to have had a prior nomination.)
- Wins: 135
- Nominations: 470

The Crown is a historical drama streaming television series created by Peter Morgan for Netflix, and released on 4 November 2016. It portrays the reign of Queen Elizabeth II throughout the decades, changing the cast every two seasons. Queen Elizabeth II is portrayed by Claire Foy (season 1–2), Olivia Colman (season 3–4), and Imelda Staunton (season 5–6), while Prince Philip is portrayed by Matt Smith (season 1–2), Tobias Menzies (season 3–4), and Jonathan Pryce (season 5–6). Princess Margaret is portrayed by Vanessa Kirby (season 1–2), Helena Bonham Carter (season 3–4) and Lesley Manville (season 5–6). Season three introduced adult versions of Charles, Prince of Wales and Diana, Princess of Wales, portrayed by Josh O'Connor and Emma Corrin respectively, and were succeeded by Dominic West, and Elizabeth Debicki in season five and six. Various UK Prime Ministers are also portrayed in the show, most notably Winston Churchill played by John Lithgow, and Margaret Thatcher played by Gillian Anderson.

The Crown has been praised for its acting, directing, writing, cinematography, and production values, and has received many awards and nominations. In 2021, the series won all seven drama categories at the 73rd Primetime Emmy Awards, becoming the first to do so. (Note: As attributed by sources published by TheWrap.) Prior to 2021, the series had been nominated three times for Outstanding Drama Series. It also won Best Drama Television Series twice at the 74th Golden Globe Awards and 78th Golden Globe Awards, and Outstanding Performance by an Ensemble in a Drama Series at the 26th Screen Actors Guild Awards and the 27th Screen Actors Guild Awards.

== AARP Movies for Grownups Awards ==
AARP's annual 'Movies for Grownups' awards program honors the movies, actors, actresses, and directors who made last year's best films.

Year	Category	Nominee	Result	Ref.
2021	Best Series	The Crown	Nominated	
2021	Best Actress	Gillian Anderson	Nominated	
2024	Best Actress	Imelda Staunton	Nominated	
2025	Best Series	The Crown	Nominated	

== Actors and Actresses Union Awards ==
Year	Category	Nominee	Result	Ref.
2023	Best Actor in an International Production	Abdelatif Hwidar	Nominated	

== American Cinema Editors Eddie Awards ==
Year	Category	Nominee	Result	Ref.
2017	Best Edited One Hour Series for Non-Commercial Television	Yan Miles (for "Assassins")	Nominated	

== American Film Institute Awards ==
Year	Category	Nominee	Result	Ref.
2016	Top 10 TV Programs of the Year	The Crown	Won	
2017	Top 10 TV Programs of the Year	The Crown	Won	
2019	Top 10 TV Programs of the Year	The Crown	Won	
2020	Top 10 TV Programs of the Year	The Crown	Won	

== American Society of Cinematographers Awards ==
Year	Category	Nominee	Result	Ref.
2017	Outstanding Achievement in Cinematography in an Episode of a One-Hour Television Series – Non-Commercial	Adriano Goldman (for "Smoke and Mirrors")	Won	
2018	Outstanding Achievement in Cinematography in an Episode of a One-Hour Television Series – Non-Commercial	Adriano Goldman (for "Beryl")	Won	
2021	Outstanding Achievement in Cinematography in an Episode of a One-Hour Television Series – Non-Commercial	Adriano Goldman (for "Fairytale")	Nominated	
2021	Outstanding Achievement in Cinematography in an Episode of a One-Hour Television Series – Non-Commercial	Fabian Wagner (for "Imbroglio")	Won	

== Art Directors Guild Awards ==
The Art Directors Guild present the ADG Excellence in Production Design Awards for American film, television, and other media with outstanding production design.

Year	Category	Nominee	Result	Ref.
2016	One-Hour Period or Fantasy Single-Camera Television Series	Martin Childs	Nominated	
2017	One-Hour Period or Fantasy Single-Camera Television Series	Martin Childs (for "A Company of Men", "Beryl", "Dear Mrs. Kennedy")	Nominated	
2019	One-Hour Period or Fantasy Single-Camera Television Series	Martin Childs (for "Aberfan")	Nominated	
2020	One-Hour Period or Fantasy Single-Camera Television Series	Martin Childs (for "War")	Nominated	
2022	One-Hour Period Single-Camera Television Series	Martin Childs (for "Ipatiev House")	Nominated	
2023	One-Hour Period Single-Camera Television Series	Martin Childs (for "Sleep, Deary Child")	Nominated	

== Artios Awards ==
The Artios is awarded to those Casting Society of America (CSA) members who receive primary screen (or program) credit for casting on the winning project.

Year	Category	Nominee	Result	Ref.
2017	Outstanding Achievement in Casting – Television Pilot and First Season Drama	Nina Gold, Robert Sterne	Nominated	
2018	Outstanding Achievement in Casting – Television Drama Series	Nina Gold, Robert Sterne	Won	
2025	Outstanding Achievement in Casting – Television Drama Series	Robert Sterne; Luci Lenox	Pending	

== ASCAP Film and Television Music Awards ==
The ASCAP Film & TV Awards are given since 1986 and honor (ASCAP) composers, lyricists and publishers of the most performed music from television and top box office movies.

Year	Category	Nominee	Result	Ref.
2021	Television Score of the Year	Martin Phipps, The Crown	Nominated	

== Association of Motion Picture Sound (AMPS) Awards ==
The AMPS Awards are presented annually for excellence in sound and are gaining increasing significance on the world stage.

Year	Category	Nominee	Result	Ref.
2017	Excellence in Sound for a Television Drama	The Crown	Nominated	
2018	Excellence in Sound for a Television Drama	The Crown	Nominated	
2020	Excellence in Sound for a Television Drama	The Crown	Nominated	

== Astra Television Awards ==
Year	Category	Nominee	Result	Ref.
2023	Best Streaming Series, Drama	The Crown	Nominated	
2023	Best Actor in a Streaming Series, Drama	Dominic West	Nominated	
2023	Best Supporting Actor in a Streaming Series, Drama	Jonathan Pryce	Nominated	
2023	Best Supporting Actress in a Streaming Series, Drama	Elizabeth Debicki	Won (Note: Tied with Jeri Ryan for Star Trek: Picard)	
2023	Best Supporting Actress in a Streaming Series, Drama	Lesley Manville	Nominated	
2023	Best Writing in a Streaming Series, Drama	Peter Morgan (for "Gunpowder")	Nominated	
2024	Best Streaming Series, Drama	The Crown	Nominated	
2024	Best Actress in a Streaming Series, Drama	Imelda Staunton	Nominated	
2024	Best Supporting Actor in a Streaming Series, Drama	Jonathan Pryce	Nominated	
2024	Best Supporting Actress in a Streaming Series, Drama	Elizabeth Debicki	Nominated	
2024	Best Guest Actress in a Drama series	Claire Foy	Nominated	
2024	Best Writing in a Streaming Series, Drama	Peter Morgan (for "Sleep, Dearie Sleep")	Nominated	

== Astra Creative Arts Television Awards ==
Year	Category	Nominee	Result	Ref.
2023	Best Guest Actor in a Drama Series	Timothy Dalton	Nominated	
2023	Best Guest Actress in a Drama Series	Vanessa Kirby	Nominated	
2023	Best Casting in a Drama Series	The Crown	Nominated	
2023	Best Period Costumes	The Crown	Won	

== Australian Academy of Cinema and Television Arts (AACTA) International Awards ==
The awards recognise excellence in the film and television industry, both locally and internationally, including the producers, directors, actors, writers, and cinematographers. It is the most prestigious awards ceremony for the Australian film and television industry. They are generally considered to be the Australian counterpart of the Academy Awards for the U.S. and the BAFTA Awards for the U.K.

Year	Category	Nominee	Result	Ref.
2020	Best Drama Series	The Crown	Nominated	
2022	Best Actress in a Series	Elizabeth Debicki	Nominated	
2023	Best Drama Series	The Crown	Nominated	
2023	Best Actress in a Series	Elizabeth Debicki	Nominated	
2024	Best Actress in a Series	Elizabeth Debicki	Won	

== British Academy Television Awards ==
The British Academy Television Awards are presented in an award show hosted by the BAFTA. They have been awarded annually since 1955.

Year	Category	Nominee	Result	Ref.
2017	Best Drama Series	The Crown	Nominated	
2017	Best Actress	Claire Foy	Nominated	
2017	Best Supporting Actor	Jared Harris	Nominated	
2017	Best Supporting Actor	John Lithgow	Nominated	
2017	Best Supporting Actress	Vanessa Kirby	Nominated	
2018	Best Drama Series	The Crown	Nominated	
2018	Best Actress	Claire Foy	Nominated	
2018	Best Supporting Actress	Vanessa Kirby	Won	
2020	Best Drama Series	The Crown	Nominated	
2020	Best Supporting Actor	Josh O'Connor	Nominated	
2020	Best Supporting Actress	Helena Bonham Carter	Nominated	
2021	Best Drama Series	The Crown	Nominated	
2021	Best Actor	Josh O'Connor	Nominated	
2021	Best Supporting Actor	Tobias Menzies	Nominated	
2021	Best Supporting Actress	Helena Bonham Carter	Nominated	
2023	Best Actress	Imelda Staunton	Nominated	
2023	Best Supporting Actor	Salim Daw	Nominated	
2024	Best Actor	Dominic West	Nominated	
2024	Best Supporting Actor	Salim Daw	Nominated	
2024	Best Supporting Actress	Elizabeth Debicki	Nominated	
2024	Best Supporting Actress	Lesley Manville	Nominated	

== British Academy Television Craft Awards ==
The British Academy Television Craft Awards are accolades presented by the British Academy of Film and Television Arts, established in 2000 as a way to spotlight technical achievements.

Year	Category	Nominee	Result	Ref.
2017	Best Costume Design	Michele Clapton	Won	
2017	Best Director: Fiction	Stephen Daldry	Nominated	
2017	Best Writer: Drama	Peter Morgan	Nominated	
2017	Best Photography & Lightning: Fiction	Adriano Goldman	Nominated	
2017	Best Production Design	Martin Childs	Nominated	
2017	Best Special, Visual & Graphic Effects	One of Us and Molinare	Won	
2017	Best Titles and Graphic Identity	Patrick Clair and Raoul Marks	Nominated	
2018	Best Writer: Drama	Peter Morgan	Nominated	
2018	Best Editing: Fiction	Pia Di Ciaula	Nominated	
2018	Best Costume Design	Jane Petrie	Nominated	
2018	Best Production Design	Martin Childs and Alison Harvey	Nominated	
2018	Best Photography & Lighting: Fiction	Adriano Goldman	Won	
2018	Best Special, Visual & Graphic Effects	One of Us, Asa Shoul and Christopher Reynolds	Nominated	
2018	Best Sound: Fiction	Sound Team	Won	
2020	Best Production Design	Martin Childs and Alison Harvey	Nominated	
2020	Best Photography & Lighting: Fiction	Adriano Goldman	Nominated	
2020	Best Special, Visual & Graphic Effects	Ben Turner, Chris Reynolds, and Asa Should	Nominated	
2020	Best Sound: Fiction	Sound Team	Nominated	
2021	Best Costume Design	Amy Roberts	Nominated	
2021	Best Director: Fiction	Benjamin Caron (for "Aberfan")	Nominated	
2021	Best Make-Up & Hair Design	Cate Hall	Nominated	
2021	Best Original Music	Martin Phipps	Nominated	
2021	Best Sound: Fiction	Sound Team	Nominated	
2021	Best Special, Visual & Graphic Effects	Ben Turner, Reece Ewing, Chris Reynolds, Asa Shoul, Framestore, Untold Studios	Nominated	
2023	Best Costume Design	Amy Roberts	Nominated	
2023	Best Sound: Fiction	Sound Team	Nominated	
2023	Best Editing: Fiction	Celia Haining	Nominated	
2024	Best Costume Design	Amy Reberts	Nominated	
2024	Best Make-Up & Hair Design	Cate Hall, Emile Yong-Mills, Fiona Rogers	Nominated	
2024	Best Sound: Fiction	Sound Team	Nominated	
2024	Best Special, Visual & Graphic Effects	Ben Turner, Reece Ewing, Framestore, Rumble Vfx, Asa Shoul, Chris Reynolds	Nominated	

== British Film Designers Guild Awards ==
The BFDG Awards celebrate and congratulate the members of the guild and the wealth of talent within the British Art Department.

Year	Category	Nominee	Result	Ref.
2017	Best Production Design - International TV Drama including Mini Series, TV Movie or Limited Series	Martin Childs, The Crown	Won	

== British Screenwriters Awards ==
The awards continue to celebrate excellence in screenwriting and recognize the talented individuals shaping UK television and film.

Year	Category	Nominee	Result	Ref.
2017	Best British TV Drama Writing	Peter Morgan, The Crown	Nominated	

== British Society of Cinematographers Awards ==
Year	Category	Nominee	Result	Ref.
2017	Television Drama	Stuart Howell, The Crown	Won	
2017	Best Cinematography in a Television Drama	Adriano Goldman, The Crown (for "Smoke and Mirrors")	Nominated	
2018	Best Cinematography in a Television Drama	Adriano Goldman, The Crown (for "Beryl")	Nominated	
2018	Best Cinematography in a Television Drama	Stuart Howell, The Crown (for "Misadventure")	Nominated	
2020	Best Cinematography in a Television Drama	Adriano Goldman, The Crown (for "Fairytale")	Nominated	
2020	Television Drama	Chris Bain, The Crown	Nominated	

== Broadcasting Press Guild Awards ==
These recognise outstanding UK programmes and performances seen or heard in the preceding year. All but three of the 16 Awards are voted for by the membership. The rest are decided by specialist panels.

Year	Category	Nominee	Result	Ref.
2017	Best Online First / Streaming	The Crown	Won	
2017	Best Actor	Matt Smith	Nominated	
2017	Best Actress	Claire Foy	Nominated	
2017	Best Writer	Peter Morgan	Nominated	
2018	Best Digital First Streaming	The Crown	Won	
2018	Best Actress	Claire Foy	Won	
2018	Best Actor	Matt Smith	Nominated	
2018	Best Writer	Peter Morgan	Nominated	
2020	BPG Breakthrough Award	Erin Doherty, The Crown	Nominated	
2021	BPG Breakthrough Award	Emma Corrin, The Crown	Won	

== The C21 International Drama Awards ==
The awards are judged by more than 100 of the world's leading drama commissioners and buyers.

Year	Category	Nominee	Result	Ref.
2017	Best Casting of a Drama Series	The Crown	Won	
2017	Best English Language Drama Series	The Crown	Nominated	
2017	Female Performance in a Drama Series	Claire Foy	Nominated	
2017	Male Performance in a Drama Series	John Lithgow	Nominated	
2018	Casting of a Drama Series	The Crown	Nominated	
2018	Best Female Performance in a Drama Series	Claire Foy	Nominated	
2020	Best Returning Drama Series	The Crown	Nominated	
2020	Best Individual Performance in a Drama Series	Olivia Colman, The Crown	Nominated	
2020	Best Casting of a Drama Series	The Crown	Nominated	
2021	Best Returning Drama Series	The Crown	Won	

== Camerimage Festival Awards ==
Year	Category	Nominee	Result	Ref.
2016	Best Pilot	Adriano Goldman, The Crown (for "Wolferton Splash")	Nominated	

== Canadian Cinema Editors Awards ==
Year	Category	Nominee	Result	Ref.
2019	Best Editing in TV Drama	Pia Di Ciaula, The Crown (for "Paterfamilias"")	Won	

== Cinema Audio Society Awards ==
Year	Category	Nominee	Result	Ref.
2018	Outstanding Achievement in Sound Mixing for Television Series – One Hour	Chris Ashworth, Lee Walpole, Stuart Hilliker, Martin Jensen, Rory de Carteret, and Philip Clements (for "Misadventure")	Nominated	
2021	Outstanding Achievement in Sound Mixing for Television Series – One Hour	Chris Ashworth, Lee Walpole, Stuart Hilliker, Martin Jensen, Gibran Farrah and Catherine Thoma (for "Gold Stick")	Nominated	
2023	Outstanding Achievement in Sound Mixing for Television Series – One Hour	Chris Ashworth, Stuart Hilliker, Lee Walpole, Martin Jensen, Ben Tisdall, Anna Wright (for "Gunpowder")	Nominated	

== Costume Designers Guild Awards ==
Year	Category	Nominee	Result	Ref.
2017	Excellence in Period Television	Michele Clapton	Won	
2018	Excellence in Period Television	Jane Petrie	Won	
2020	Excellence in Period Television	Amy Roberts (for "Cri De Coeur")	Nominated	
2021	Excellence in Period Television	Amy Roberts (for "Terra Nullius")	Nominated	
2023	Excellence in Period Television	Amy Roberts (for "Ipatiev House")	Won	
2024	Excellence in Period Television	Amy Roberts (for "Ritz")	Nominated	

== Critics' Choice Television Awards ==
The Critics' Choice Television Awards are presented annually since 2011 by the Broadcast Television Journalists Association. The awards were launched "to enhance access for broadcast journalists covering the television industry".

Year	Category	Nominee	Result	Ref.
2017	Best Drama Series	The Crown	Nominated	
2017	Best Supporting Actor in a Drama Series	John Lithgow	Won	
2017	Best Guest Performer in a Drama Series	Jared Harris	Nominated	
2018	Best Drama Series	The Crown	Nominated	
2018	Best Actress in a Drama Series	Claire Foy	Nominated	
2020	Best Drama Series	The Crown	Nominated	
2020	Best Actor in a Drama Series	Tobias Menzies	Nominated	
2020	Best Actress in a Drama Series	Olivia Colman	Nominated	
2020	Best Supporting Actress in a Drama Series	Helena Bonham Carter	Nominated	
2021	Best Drama Series	The Crown	Won	
2021	Best Actor in a Drama Series	Josh O'Connor	Won	
2021	Best Actress in a Drama Series	Olivia Colman	Nominated	
2021	Best Actress in a Drama Series	Emma Corrin	Won	
2021	Best Supporting Actor in a Drama Series	Tobias Menzies	Nominated	
2021	Best Supporting Actress in a Drama Series	Gillian Anderson	Won	
2022	Best Drama Series	The Crown	Nominated	
2023	Best Drama Series	The Crown	Nominated	
2023	Best Supporting Actor in a Drama Series	Khalid Abdalla	Nominated	
2023	Best Supporting Actress in a Drama Series	Elizabeth Debicki	Won	

== Dorian Awards ==
The Society of LGBTQ Entertainment Critics (GALECA) honours its picks for the year's finest in film and television, from mainstream to LGBTQ-focused, via their Dorian Awards—named with a nod to the great and gay wit Oscar Wilde.

Year	Category	Nominee	Result	Ref.
2017	TV Drama of the Year	The Crown	Nominated	
2017	TV Performance of the Year – Actress	Claire Foy	Nominated	
2018	TV Drama of the Year	The Crown	Nominated	
2018	TV Performance of the Year – Actress	Claire Foy	Nominated	
2021	Best TV Drama	The Crown	Nominated	
2021	Best Supporting TV Performance	Gillian Anderson	Nominated	
2021	Most Visually Striking Show	The Crown	Nominated	

== Edinburgh International TV Festival Awards ==
Year	Category	Nominee	Result	Ref.
2017	New Programme of the Year	The Crown	Nominated	
2018	Best International Drama Series	The Crown	Nominated	
2020	Best Drama	The Crown	Nominated	
2020	Best TV Actor	Olivia Colman	Nominated	

== Empire Awards ==
Year	Category	Nominee	Result	Ref.
2018	Best TV Series	The Crown	Won	
2018	Best Actress in TV Series	Claire Foy	Nominated	
2018	Best Actor in TV Series	Matt Smith	Nominated	

== Environmental Media Association Awards ==
The EMA Awards honor film and television productions and individuals that increase public awareness of environmental issues and inspire personal action on these issues.

Year	Category	Nominee	Result	Ref.
2017	Television Episodic Drama	The Crown	Won	

== FMF Krakow Film Music Festival Awards ==
Year	Category	Nominee	Result	Ref.
2020	Film Music Composer	Cali Wang, The Crown	Nominated	

== Glamour Awards ==
Year	Category	Nominee	Result	Ref.
2017	Best UK TV Actress	Vanessa Kirby	Won	

== Golden Globe Awards ==
Year	Category	Nominee	Result	Ref.
2017	Best Television Series – Drama	The Crown	Won	
2017	Best Actress – Television Series Drama	Claire Foy	Won	
2017	Best Supporting Actor – Series, Miniseries, or Television Film	John Lithgow	Nominated	
2018	Best Television Series – Drama	The Crown	Nominated	
2018	Best Actress – Television Series Drama	Claire Foy	Nominated	
2020	Best Television Series – Drama	The Crown	Nominated	
2020	Best Actor – Television Series Drama	Tobias Menzies	Nominated	
2020	Best Actress – Television Series Drama	Olivia Colman	Won	
2020	Best Supporting Actress – Series, Miniseries, or Television Film	Helena Bonham Carter	Nominated	
2021	Best Television Series – Drama	The Crown	Won	
2021	Best Actor – Television Series Drama	Josh O'Connor	Won	
2021	Best Actress – Television Series Drama	Olivia Colman	Nominated	
2021	Best Actress – Television Series Drama	Emma Corrin	Won	
2021	Best Supporting Actress – Series, Miniseries, or Television Film	Gillian Anderson	Won	
2021	Best Supporting Actress – Series, Miniseries, or Television Film	Helena Bonham Carter	Nominated	
2023	Best Television Series – Drama	The Crown	Nominated	
2023	Best Actress – Television Series Drama	Imelda Staunton	Nominated	
2023	Best Supporting Actor – Series, Miniseries or Television Film	Jonathan Pryce	Nominated	
2023	Best Best Supporting Actress – Series, Miniseries or Television Film	Elizabeth Debicki	Nominated	
2024	Best Television Series – Drama	The Crown	Nominated	
2024	Best Actress in a Television Series – Drama	Imelda Staunton	Nominated	
2024	Best Actor in a Television Series – Drama	Dominic West	Nominated	
2024	Best Supporting Actress – Series, Miniseries or Television Film	Elizabeth Debicki	Won	

== Golden Trailer Awards ==
Year	Category	Nominee	Result	Ref.
2017	Best TrailerByte for a TV Series/Streaming Series	"Facebook Canvas" (Paradise)	Nominated	
2017	Most Innovative Advertising (for a TV Series/Streaming Series)	"Facebook Canvas" (Paradise)	Nominated	
2018	Most Original (TV Spot / Trailer / Teaser for a series)	"The Crown Trailer" (Intermission Film)	Nominated	
2018	Best Music (TV Spot / Trailer / Teaser for a series)	"For You" (GrandSon)	Nominated	
2021	Best Music for a TV/Streaming Series (Trailer/Teaser/TV Spot)	"Destiny" (JAX)	Won	
2023	Best Drama for a TV/Streaming Series (Trailer/Teaser/TV Spot)	"Breaking Point" (Create Advertising London)	Nominated	

== Guild of Music Supervisors Awards ==
The UK & European Guild of Music Supervisors is dedicated to raising awareness and understanding of the role of a music supervisor within the entertainment and media industries including film, television, gaming, advertising, trailers, interactive media and theatre.

Year	Category	Nominee	Result	Ref.
2022	Best Music Supervision	Sarah Bridge, The Crown	Nominated	

== Hollywood Critics Association Television Awards ==
Year	Category	Nominee	Result	Ref.
2021	Best Streaming Series, Drama	The Crown	Nominated	
2021	Best Actor in a Streaming Series, Drama	Josh O'Connor	Won	
2021	Best Actress in a Streaming Series, Drama	Emma Corrin	Won	
2021	Best Actress in a Streaming Series, Drama	Olivia Colman	Nominated	
2021	Best Supporting Actor in a Streaming Series, Drama	Tobias Menzies	Nominated	
2021	Best Supporting Actress in a Streaming Series, Drama	Gillian Anderson	Won	

== Hollywood Make-Up Artists and Hair Stylists Guild Awards ==
Year	Category	Nominee	Result	Ref.
2017	Best Period and/or Character Make-Up	The Crown	Nominated	
2017	Best Period and/or Character Hair Styling	The Crown	Won	
2020	Best Period and/or Character Make-Up	The Crown	Nominated	
2020	Best Period and/or Character Hair Styling	The Crown	Nominated	
2023	Best Period and/or Character Make-Up in a Television Series, Limited, Miniseries, or Movie for Television	Cate Hall, Emilie Yong-Mills, Debbie Ormrod, Stacey Holman	Won	
2023	Best Period and/or Character Hair Styling in a Television Series, Limited, Miniseries, or Movie for Television	Cate Hall, Emilie Yong- Mills, Francesca Hissey, Oonagh Bagley	Nominated	

== Hollywood Music in Media Awards ==
Year	Category	Nominee	Result	Ref.
2016	Best Main Title – TV Show/Digital Streaming Series	Hans Zimmer	Nominated	
2017	Original Score – TV Show / Limited Series	Rupert Gregson-Williams	Nominated	
2021	Original Score – TV Show / Limited Series	Martin Phipps	Nominated	

== Hollywood Professional Association Awards ==
The HPA Awards are the standard bearer for excellence and innovation in an industry embracing an expanding array of groundbreaking technologies and creativity. Bestowed at a gala celebration each November, the Awards honor creative achievement, outstanding artistry, lifetime achievement, and engineering excellence.

Year	Category	Nominee	Result	Ref.
2017	Outstanding Color Grading - Television	The Crown	Won	
2017	Outstanding Visual Effects - Television	The Crown	Nominated	
2018	Outstanding Color Grading - Television	The Crown	Won	

== Humanitas Prize Awards ==
Since 1974, The Humanitas Prize Awards have honoured professional film and television writers whose work explores the human condition in a nuanced and meaningful way.

Year	Category	Nominee	Result	Ref.
2024	Drama Teleplay	The Crown (for "Ritz"), Meriel Sheibani-Clare, Peter Morgan	Nominated	

== IGN Summer Movie Awards ==
Year	Category	Nominee	Result	Ref.
2019	Best TV Drama Series	The Crown	Nominated	
2019	Overall Best TV Series of the Year	The Crown	Nominated	
2020	Best Dramatic TV Performance	Gillian Anderson, The Crown	Nominated	
2020	Best Dramatic TV Performance	Olivia Colman, The Crown	Nominated	

== International Institute of Film Science and Arts ==
Year	Category	Nominee	Result	Ref.
2025	Best Television Series	The Crown	Nominated	
2025	Best Actress in a Leading Role	Imelda Stauton	Nominated	
2025	Best Actress in a Supporting Role	Elizabeth Debicki	Nominated	
2025	Best Costume Design in Television	Amy Roberts, Sidonie Roberts & Costume Team	Nominated	
2025	Best Cinematography	Adriano Goldman & DP Team	Nominated	

== International Online Cinema Awards ==
Year	Category	Nominee	Result	Ref.
2017	Best Supporting Actor in a Drama Series	John Lithgow, The Crown	Nominated	
2018	Best Actress in a Drama Series	Claire Foy, The Crown	Nominated	
2018	Best Supporting Actress in a Drama Series	Vanessa Kirby, The Crown	Nominated	
2018	Best Guest Actor in a Comedy or Drama Series	Matthew Goode, The Crown	Nominated	
2020	Best Guest Actress in a Drama Series	Jane Lapotaire, The Crown	Won	
2020	Best Supporting Actor in a Drama Series	Josh O'Connor, The Crown	Nominated	
2020	Best Guest Actor in a Drama Series	Charles Dance, The Crown	Nominated	
2021	Best Drama Series	The Crown	Won	
2021	Best Actress in a Drama Series	Emma Corrin, The Crown	Won	
2021	Best Supporting Actress in a Drama Series	Gillian Anderson, The Crown	Won	
2021	Best Actor in a Drama Series	Josh O'Connor, The Crown	Won	
2021	Best Guest Actor in a Drama Series	Charles Dance, The Crown	Won	
2021	Best Ensemble in a Drama Series	The Crown	Won	
2021	Best Directing for a Drama Series	Benjamin Caron, The Crown (for "Fairytale")	Nominated	
2021	Best Directing for a Drama Series	Jessica Hobbs, The Crown (for "War")	Nominated	
2021	Best Writing for a Drama Series	Peter Morgan, The Crown (for "War")	Nominated	

== Irish Film and Television Awards ==
The Irish Film & Television Academy Awards are presented annually by the IFTA to award best in films and television.

Year	Category	Nominee	Result	Ref.
2017	Best Editing	Úna Ní Dhonghaíle	Nominated	

== Location Managers Guild Awards ==
The Location Managers Guild Awards are awarded at an annual show honouring outstanding contributions to location scouting in the film and television industries.

Year	Category	Nominee	Result	Ref.
2017	Outstanding Locations in Period Television	Pat Karam and Robert Bentley	Won	
2018	Outstanding Locations in Period Television	Pat Karam and Robert Bentley	Nominated	
2020	Outstanding Locations in Period Television	Pat Karam, Pedro "Tate" Aråez	Nominated	
2021	Outstanding Locations in Period Television	Pat Karam, Pedro "Tate" Aråez	Won	

== Motion Picture Sound Editor Golden Reel Awards ==
The Motion Picture Sound Editors is honored to host an annual celebration of outstanding achievements in sound editorial via the Golden Reel Awards.

Year	Category	Nominee	Result	Ref.
2017	Outstanding Achievement in Sound Editing – Dialogue and ADR for Episodic Short Form Broadcast Media	Lee Walpole, Kallis Shamaris, Iain Eyre (for "Paterfamilias")	Nominated	
2019	Outstanding Achievement in Sound Editing – Dialogue and ADR for Episodic Long Form Broadcast Media	Lee Walpole, Tom Williams, Steve Little (for "Aberfan")	Nominated	
2020	Outstanding Achievement in Sound Editing – Dialogue and ADR for Episodic Long Form Broadcast Media	Lee Walpole, Jeff Richardson, Steve Little, Tom Williams (for "Fairytale")	Nominated	
2022	Outstanding Achievement in Sound Editing – Broadcast Long Form Dialogue and ADR	Lee Walpole, Iain Eyre, Matt Mewett (for "Gunpowder")	Won	
2023	Outstanding Achievement in Sound Editing – Broadcast Long Form Dialogue and ADR	Lee Walpole, Iain Eyre, Steve Little, Abbie Shaw, Matthew Mewett (for "Ritz")	Nominated	

== MovieGuide Awards ==
Year	Category	Nominee	Result	Ref.
2018	Epiphany Prize to the Most Inspiring TV Program of 2017	The Crown	Nominated	
2018	Faith and Freedom Award for TV	The Crown (for "Vergangenheit")	Nominated	
2018	Christie Peters Grace Award for Most Inspiring Performance for TV	Claire Foy, The Crown (for "Vergangenheit")	Nominated	
2018	Christie Peters Grace Award for Most Inspiring Performance for TV	Paul Sparks, The Crown (for "Vergangenheit")	Won	
2020	Epiphany Prize to the Most Inspiring TV Program	The Crown (for "Moondust")	Nominated	
2020	Faith and Freedom Award for TV	The Crown (for "Moondust")	Nominated	
2020	Grace Award for Most Inspiring Performance for TV	Tobias Menzies, The Crown (for "Moondust")	Nominated	

== MTV Movie & TV Awards ==
The MTV Movie & TV Awards is an annual award show presented by MTV to honor outstanding achievements in films. Founded in 1992, the winners of the awards are decided online by the audience.

Year	Category	Nominee	Result	Ref.
2021	Best Performance in a Show	Emma Corrin	Nominated	

== National Film Awards UK ==
The National Film Awards celebrate the achievements of established and independent filmmakers, actors, actresses, casting directors, production companies, and crew who make up the motion picture industry.

Year	Category	Nominee	Result	Ref.
2020	Best Actress in a TV Series	Olivia Colman	Nominated	
2020	Best Actor in a TV Series	Tobias Menzies	Nominated	
2021	Best Actress in a TV Series	Olivia Colman	Nominated	
2021	Best Actor in a TV Series	Tobias Menzies	Nominated	
2021	Best Screenplay in a TV Series	Peter Morgan	Nominated	

== National Television Awards UK ==
Year	Category	Nominee	Result	Ref.
2021	Returning Drama	The Crown	Nominated	

== Newport Beach Film Festival Awards ==
Year	Category	Nominee	Result	Ref.
2020	Breakthrough Awards	Erin Doherty, The Crown	Won	

== Online Film & Television Association Awards ==
Year	Category	Nominee	Result	Ref.
2017	Best Drama Series	The Crown	Nominated	
2017	Best Actress in a Drama Series	Claire Foy	Nominated	
2017	Best Actor in a Drama Series	Matt Smith	Nominated	
2017	Best Supporting Actor in a Drama Series	John Lithgow	Won	
2017	Best Guest Actor in a Drama Series	Jared Harris	Won	
2017	Best Ensemble in a Drama Series	The Crown	Nominated	
2017	Best Direction in a Drama Series	The Crown	Nominated	
2017	Best Writing in a Drama Series	Peter Morgan	Nominated	
2017	Best Music in a Series	The Crown	Won	
2017	Best Editing in a Series	The Crown	Nominated	
2017	Best Cinematography in a Series	The Crown	Won	
2017	Best Production Design in a Series	The Crown	Won	
2017	Best Costume Design in a Series	The Crown	Won	
2017	Best Make-up/Hairstyling in a Series	The Crown	Won	
2017	Best New Theme Song in a Series	The Crown	Won	
2017	Best New Titles Sequence	The Crown	Nominated	
2018	Best Drama Series	The Crown	Won	
2018	Best Actress in a Drama Series	Claire Foy	Won	
2018	Best Supporting Actor in a Drama Series	Matt Smith	Nominated	
2018	Best Supporting Actress in a Drama Series	Vanessa Kirby	Nominated	
2018	Best Guest Actor in a Drama Series	Matthew Goode	Nominated	
2018	Best Guest Actor in a Drama Series	Michael C. Hall	Nominated	
2018	Best Ensemble in a Drama Series	The Crown	Nominated	
2018	Best Direction in a Drama Series	The Crown	Nominated	
2018	Best Writing in a Drama Series	Peter Morgan	Nominated	
2018	Best Music in a Series	The Crown	Nominated	
2018	Best Cinematography in a Series	The Crown	Nominated	
2018	Best Production Design in a Series	The Crown	Won	
2018	Best Costume Design in a Series	The Crown	Won	
2018	Best Make-up/Hairstyling in a Series	The Crown	Nominated	
2020	Best Drama Series	The Crown	Nominated	
2020	Best Actress in a Drama Series	Olivia Colman	Won	
2020	Best Supporting Actor in a Drama Series	Josh O'Connor	Nominated	
2020	Best Supporting Actress in a Drama Series	Helena Bonham Carter	Won	
2020	Best Guest Actor in a Drama Series	Charles Dance	Nominated	
2020	Best Guest Actress in a Drama Series	Jane Lapotaire	Nominated	
2020	Best Ensemble in a Drama Series	The Crown	Nominated	
2020	Best Direction in a Drama Series	The Crown	Nominated	
2020	Best Writing in a Drama Series	Peter Morgan	Nominated	
2020	Best Music in a Series	The Crown	Nominated	
2020	Best Editing in a Series	The Crown	Nominated	
2020	Best Cinematography in a Series	The Crown	Nominated	
2020	Best Production Design in a Series	The Crown	Won	
2020	Best Costume Design in a Series	The Crown	Won	
2020	Best Make-up/Hairstyling in a Series	The Crown	Won	
2020	Best Sound in a Series	The Crown	Nominated	
2020	Best Visual Effects in a Series	The Crown	Nominated	

== People's Choice Awards ==
Year	Category	Nominee	Result	Ref.
2024	The Bingeworthy Show of the Year	The Crown	Nominated	

== Prémios Fantastic ==
Year	Category	Nominee	Result	Ref.
2021	Best International Series or Mini-Series in Streaming (Melhor Série ou Mini-Série Internacional em Streaming)	The Crown	Won	

== Emmy Awards ==
=== Primetime Emmy Awards ===
Year	Category	Nominee	Result	Ref.
2017	Outstanding Drama Series	Peter Morgan, Stephen Daldry, Andy Harries, Philip Martin, Suzanne Mackie, Matthew Byam-Shaw, Robert Fox, Tanya Seghatchian, and Andrew Eaton	Nominated	
2017	Outstanding Lead Actress in a Drama Series	Claire Foy (for "Assassins")	Nominated	
2017	Outstanding Supporting Actor in a Drama Series	John Lithgow (for "Assassins")	Won	
2017	Outstanding Directing for a Drama Series	Stephen Daldry (for "Hyde Park Corner")	Nominated	
2017	Outstanding Writing for a Drama Series	Peter Morgan (for "Assassins")	Nominated	
2018	Outstanding Drama Series	Peter Morgan, Stephen Daldry, Andy Harries, Philip Martin, Suzanne Mackie, Matthew Byam-Shaw, Robert Fox, Andy Stebbing, and Martin Harrison	Nominated	
2018	Outstanding Lead Actress in a Drama Series	Claire Foy (for "Dear Mrs Kennedy")	Won	
2018	Outstanding Supporting Actor in a Drama Series	Matt Smith (for "Mystery Man")	Nominated	
2018	Outstanding Supporting Actress in a Drama Series	Vanessa Kirby (for "Beryl")	Nominated	
2018	Outstanding Directing for a Drama Series	Stephen Daldry (for "Paterfamilias")	Won	
2018	Outstanding Writing for a Drama Series	Peter Morgan (for "Mystery Man")	Nominated	
2020	Outstanding Drama Series	Peter Morgan, Stephen Daldry, Andy Harries, Suzanne Mackie, Matthew Byam-Shaw, Robert Fox, Andy Stebbing, Martin Harrison, Benjamin Caron, Michael Casey, and Oona O'Beirn	Nominated	
2020	Outstanding Lead Actress in a Drama Series	Olivia Colman (for "Cri de Coeur")	Nominated	
2020	Outstanding Supporting Actress in a Drama Series	Helena Bonham Carter (for "Cri de Coeur")	Nominated	
2020	Outstanding Directing for a Drama Series	Benjamin Caron (for "Aberfan")	Nominated	
2020	Outstanding Directing for a Drama Series	Jessica Hobbs (for "Cri de Coeur")	Nominated	
2020	Outstanding Writing for a Drama Series	Peter Morgan (for "Aberfan")	Nominated	
2021	Outstanding Drama Series	Peter Morgan, Stephen Daldry, Andy Harries, Suzanne Mackie, Matthew Byam-Shaw, Robert Fox, Andy Stebbing, Martin Harrison, Benjamin Caron, Michael Casey, and Oona O'Beirn	Won	
2021	Outstanding Lead Actor in a Drama Series	Josh O'Connor (for "Terra Nullius")	Won	
2021	Outstanding Lead Actress in a Drama Series	Olivia Colman (for "48:1")	Won	
2021	Outstanding Lead Actress in a Drama Series	Emma Corrin (for "Fairytale")	Nominated	
2021	Outstanding Supporting Actor in a Drama Series	Tobias Menzies (for "Gold Stick")	Won	
2021	Outstanding Supporting Actress in a Drama Series	Gillian Anderson (for "Favourites")	Won	
2021	Outstanding Supporting Actress in a Drama Series	Helena Bonham Carter (for "The Hereditary Principle")	Nominated	
2021	Outstanding Supporting Actress in a Drama Series	Emerald Fennell (for "Fairytale")	Nominated	
2021	Outstanding Directing for a Drama Series	Benjamin Caron (for "Fairytale")	Nominated	
2021	Outstanding Directing for a Drama Series	Jessica Hobbs (for "War")	Won	
2021	Outstanding Writing for a Drama Series	Peter Morgan (for "War")	Won	
2023	Outstanding Drama Series	Peter Morgan, Stephen Daldry, Andy Harries, Suzanne Mackie, Matthew Byam-Shaw, Robert Fox, Andy Stebbing, Martin Harrison, Jessica Hobbs, Michael Casey, and Oona O'Beirn	Nominated	
2023	Outstanding Supporting Actress in a Drama Series	Elizabeth Debicki (for "Couple 31")	Nominated	
2024	Outstanding Drama Series	Peter Morgan, Stephen Daldry, Andy Harries, Suzanne Mackie, Matthew Byam-Shaw, Robert Fox, Andy Stebbing, Martin Harrison, Christian Schwochow, Michael Casey, and Oona O'Beirn	Nominated	
2024	Outstanding Lead Actor in a Drama Series	Dominic West (for "Aftermath")	Nominated	
2024	Outstanding Lead Actress in a Drama Series	Imelda Staunton (for "Sleep, Dearie Sleep")	Nominated	
2024	Outstanding Supporting Actor in a Drama Series	Jonathan Pryce (for "Willsmania")	Nominated	
2024	Outstanding Supporting Actress in a Drama Series	Elizabeth Debicki (“Dis-Moi Oui”)	Won	
2024	Outstanding Supporting Actress in a Drama Series	Lesley Manville (for "Ritz")	Nominated	
2024	Outstanding Directing for a Drama Series	Stephen Daldry (for "Sleep, Dearie Sleep")	Nominated	
2024	Outstanding Writing for a Drama Series	Peter Morgan, Meriel Sheibani-Clare (for "Ritz")	Nominated	

=== Primetime Creative Arts Emmy Awards ===
Year	Category	Nominee	Result	Ref.
2017	Outstanding Casting for a Drama Series	Nina Gold and Robert Sterne	Nominated	
2017	Outstanding Cinematography for a Single-Camera Series (One Hour)	Adriano Goldman (for "Smoke and Mirrors")	Nominated	
2017	Outstanding Costumes for a Period / Fantasy Series, Limited Series, or Movie	Michele Clapton, Alex Fordham, Emma O'Loughlin, and Kate O'Farrell (for "Wolferton Splash")	Won	
2017	Outstanding Hairstyling for a Single-Camera Series	Ivana Primorac, Amy Riley (for "Hyde Park Corner")	Nominated	
2017	Outstanding Main Title Design	Patrick Clair, Raoul Marks, Javier Leon Carrillo, and Jeff Han	Nominated	
2017	Outstanding Music Composition for a Series	Rupert Gregson-Williams (for "Hyde Park Corner")	Nominated	
2017	Outstanding Production Design for a Narrative Period Program (One Hour or More)	Martin Childs, Mark Raggett, and Celia Bobak (for "Smoke and Mirrors")	Won	
2017	Outstanding Special Visual Effects in a Supporting Role	Ben Turner, Tom Debenham, Standish Millennas, Kim Phelan, Oliver Cubbage, Lionel Heath, Charlie Bennet, Stephen Smith, and Carmine Agnone (for "Windsor")	Nominated	
2018	Outstanding Guest Actor in a Drama Series	Matthew Goode (for "Matrimonium")	Nominated	
2018	Outstanding Casting for a Drama Series	Nina Gold and Robert Sterne	Won	
2018	Outstanding Cinematography for a Single-Camera Series (One Hour)	Adriano Goldman (for "Beryl")	Won	
2018	Outstanding Hairstyling for a Single-Camera Series	Ivana Primorac (for "Dear Mrs Kennedy")	Nominated	
2018	Outstanding Period Costumes	Jane Petrie, Emily Newby, Basia Kuznar, and Gaby Spanswick (for "Dear Mrs Kennedy")	Won	
2018	Outstanding Production Design for a Narrative Period Program (One Hour or More)	Martin Childs, Mark Raggett, and Alison Harvey (for "Beryl")	Nominated	
2018	Outstanding Special Visual Effects in a Supporting Role	Ben Turner, Standish Millennas, Alison Griffiths, Matthew Bristowe, Iacopo Di Luigi, Garrett Honn, Charlie Bennett, Jenny Gauci, and Carmine Agnone (for "Misadventure")	Nominated	
2020	Outstanding Casting for a Drama Series	Nina Gold and Robert Sterne	Nominated	
2020	Outstanding Cinematography for a Single-Camera Series (One Hour)	Adriano Goldman (for "Aberfan")	Nominated	
2020	Outstanding Period Costumes	Amy Roberts, Sidonie Roberts, and Sarah Moore (for "Cri de Coeur")	Won	
2020	Outstanding Period and/or Character Hairstyling	Cate Hall, Louise Coles, Sarah Nuth, Suzanne David, Emilie Yong, and Catriona Johnstone (for "Cri de Coeur")	Nominated	
2020	Outstanding Music Composition for a Series (Original Dramatic Score)	Martin Phipps (for "Aberfan")	Nominated	
2020	Outstanding Production Design for a Narrative Period Program (One Hour or More)	Martin Childs, Mark Raggett, and Alison Harvey (for "Aberfan")	Won	
2020	Outstanding Sound Editing for a Comedy or Drama Series (One-Hour)	Lee Walpole, Andy Kennedy, Saoirse Christopherson, Juraj Mravec, Tom Williams, Steve Little, Tom Stewart, Anna Wright, and Catherine Thomas (for "Aberfan")	Nominated	
2021	Outstanding Guest Actor in a Drama Series	Charles Dance (for "Gold Stick")	Nominated	
2021	Outstanding Guest Actress in a Drama Series	Claire Foy (for "48:1")	Won	
2021	Outstanding Casting for a Drama Series	Robert Sterne	Won	
2021	Outstanding Cinematography for a Single-Camera Series (One Hour)	Adriano Goldman (for "Fairytale")	Won	
2021	Outstanding Period Costumes	Amy Roberts, Sidonie Roberts and Giles Gale (for "Terra Nullius")	Nominated	
2021	Outstanding Period/Character Hairstyling	Cate Hall, Emilie Yong Mills, Sam Smart, Suzanne David, Debbie Ormrod and Stacey Louise Holman (for "War")	Nominated	
2021	Outstanding Music Composition for a Series (Original Dramatic Score)	Martin Phipps (for "The Balmoral Test")	Nominated	
2021	Outstanding Music Supervision	Sarah Bridge (for "Fairytale")	Nominated	
2021	Outstanding Single-Camera Picture Editing for a Drama Series	Paulo Pandolpho (for "Avalanche")	Nominated	
2021	Outstanding Single-Camera Picture Editing for a Drama Series	Yan Miles (for "Fairytale")	Won	
2021	Outstanding Production Design for a Narrative Period or Fantasy Program (One Hour or More)	Martin Childs, Mark Raggett and Alison Harvey (for "War")	Nominated	
2021	Outstanding Sound Mixing for a Comedy or Drama Series (One-Hour)	Lee Walpole, Stuart Hilliker, Martin Jensen and Chris Ashworth (for "Fairytale")	Nominated	
2021	Outstanding Special Visual Effects in a Single Episode	Ben Turner, Reece Ewing, Andrew Scrase, Standish Millennas, Oliver Bersey, Jonathan Wood, David Fleet, Joe Cork and Garrett Honn (for "Gold Stick")	Nominated	
2023	Outstanding Casting for a Drama Series	Robert Sterne	Nominated	
2023	Outstanding Cinematography for a Single-Camera Series (One Hour)	Adriano Goldman (for "Mou Mou")	Nominated	
2023	Outstanding Period Costumes for a Series	Amy Roberts, Sidonie Roberts, Christof Roche-Gordon (for "Mou Mou")	Nominated	
2023	Outstanding Period/Character Hairstyling	Cate Hall, Emilie Yong Mills (for "Mou Mou")	Nominated	
2024	Outstanding Guest Actress in a Drama Series	Claire Foy (for "Sleep, Dearie Sleep")	Nominated	
2024	Outstanding Casting for a Drama Series	Robert Sterne	Nominated	
2024	Outstanding Cinematography for a Single-Camera Series (One Hour)	Adriano Goldman (for "Sleep, Dearie Sleep")	Nominated	
2024	Outstanding Cinematography for a Single-Camera Series (One Hour)	Sophia Olson (for "Ritz")	Nominated	
2024	Outstanding Contemporary Costumes	Amy Roberts, Sidonie Roberts and Giles Gale (for "Sleep, Dearie Sleep")	Won	
2024	Outstanding Period or Fantasy/Sci-Fi Makeup (Non-Prosthetic)	Cate Hall, Emilie Yong Mills (for "Ritz")	Nominated	
2024	Outstanding Music Composition for a Series (Original Dramatic Score)	Martin Phipps (for "Sleep, Dearie Sleep")	Nominated	
2024	Outstanding Production Design for a Narrative Contemporary Program (One Hour or More)	Martin Childs, Mark Raggett and Alison Harvey (for "Sleep, Dearie Sleep")	Won	
2024	Outstanding Sound Mixing for a Comedy or Drama Series (One-Hour)	Lee Walpole, Stuart Hilliker, Martin Jensen and Chris Ashworth (for "Sleep, Dearie Sleep")	Nominated	
2024	Outstanding Special Visual Effects in a Single Episode	Ben Turner, Reece Ewing, Oliver Bersey, Julia Stannard, Joe Cork, Tim Zaccheo, Aurélien Ronceray, Joseph Dymond and Elena Pagliei (for "Dis-Moi Oui")	Nominated	

== Producers Guild of America Awards ==
The Producers Guild of America have held annual awards to recognize American film, television, and new media since 1990.

Year	Category	Nominee	Result	Ref.
2018	Norman Felton Award for Outstanding Producer of Episodic Television, Drama	The Crown	Nominated	
2020	Norman Felton Award for Outstanding Producer of Episodic Television, Drama	The Crown	Nominated	
2021	Norman Felton Award for Outstanding Producer of Episodic Television, Drama	The Crown	Won	
2024	Norman Felton Award for Outstanding Producer of Episodic Television, Drama	The Crown	Nominated	

== Rose d'Or Awards ==
The Rose d'Or (Golden Rose) is an international awards festival in entertainment broadcasting and programming.

Year	Category	Nominee	Result	Ref.
2018	Drama Series	The Crown	Won	

== Royal Television Society Awards ==
The Royal Television Society Awards are the gold standard of achievement in the television community.

Year	Category	Nominee	Result	Ref.
2018	Special Recognition Award	The Crown	Won	
2018	Drama Series	The Crown	Nominated	

== Royal Television Society Craft & Design Awards ==
The Royal Television Society Craft & Design Awards are presented by the Royal Television Society to recognize technical achievements of British television.

Year	Category	Nominee	Result	Ref.
2017	Effects - Digital	The Digital Effects Team, One of Us	Won	
2017	Effects - Special	Chris Reynolds	Nominated	
2017	Music - Original Score	Rupert Gregson-Williams	Nominated	
2018	Effects	One Of Us, Chris Reynolds	Won	
2018	Production Design - Drama	Martin Childs, Alison Harvey	Nominated	
2020	Sound - Drama	Sound Team	Nominated	

== Satellite Awards ==
The Satellite Awards are a set of annual awards given by the International Press Academy.

Year	Category	Nominee	Result	Ref.
2017	Best Television Series – Drama	The Crown	Won	
2017	Best Supporting Actor – Series, Miniseries, or Television Film	Jared Harris	Nominated	
2019	Best Television Series – Drama	The Crown	Nominated	
2019	Best Actor in a Drama / Genre Series	Tobias Menzies	Won	
2019	Best Actress in a Drama / Genre Series	Olivia Colman	Nominated	
2020	Best Television Series – Drama	The Crown	Nominated	
2020	Best Actor in a Drama / Genre Series	Tobias Menzies	Nominated	
2020	Best Actress in a Drama / Genre Series	Olivia Colman	Won	
2020	Best Supporting Actor – Series, Miniseries, or Television Film	Josh O'Connor	Nominated	
2020	Best Supporting Actress – Series, Miniseries, or Television Film	Gillian Anderson	Nominated	
2020	Best Supporting Actress – Series, Miniseries, or Television Film	Emma Corrin	Nominated	
2024	Best Drama Series	The Crown	Nominated	
2024	Best Actress – Drama or Genre Series	Imelda Staunton	Nominated	
2024	Best Supporting Actor – Series, Miniseries & Limited Series, or Motion Picture Made for Television	Khalid Abdalla	Nominated	
2024	Best Supporting Actress – Series, Miniseries & Limited Series, or Motion Picture Made for Television	Elizabeth Debicki	Nominated	
2025	Best Actress in a Drama or Genre Series	Imelda Staunton	Nominated	

== Screen Actors Guild Awards ==
The Screen Actors Guild Awards are organized by the Screen Actors Guild‐American Federation of Television and Radio Artists. First awarded in 1995, the awards aim to recognize excellent achievements in film and television.

Year	Category	Nominee	Result	Ref.
2016	Outstanding Performance by an Ensemble in a Drama Series	Claire Foy, Clive Francis, Harry Hadden-Paton, Victoria Hamilton, Jared Harris, Daniel Ings, Billy Jenkins, Vanessa Kirby, John Lithgow, Lizzy McInnerny, Ben Miles, Jeremy Northam, Nicholas Rowe, Matt Smith, Pip Torrens, and Harriet Walter	Nominated	
2016	Outstanding Performance by a Male Actor in a Drama Series	John Lithgow	Won	
2016	Outstanding Performance by a Female Actor in a Drama Series	Claire Foy	Won	
2017	Outstanding Performance by a Female Actor in a Drama Series	Claire Foy	Won	
2017	Outstanding Performance by an Ensemble in a Drama Series	Claire Foy, Victoria Hamilton, Vanessa Kirby, Anton Lesser, and Matt Smith	Nominated	
2019	Outstanding Performance by an Ensemble in a Drama Series	Marion Bailey, Helena Bonham Carter, Olivia Colman, Charles Dance, Ben Daniels, Erin Doherty, Charles Edwards, Tobias Menzies, Josh O'Connor, Sam Phillips, David Rintoul, and Jason Watkins	Won	
2019	Outstanding Performance by a Female Actor in a Drama Series	Helena Bonham Carter	Nominated	
2019	Outstanding Performance by a Female Actor in a Drama Series	Olivia Colman	Nominated	
2020	Outstanding Performance by an Ensemble in a Drama Series	Gillian Anderson, Marion Bailey, Helena Bonham Carter, Stephen Boxer, Olivia Colman, Emma Corrin, Erin Doherty, Charles Edwards, Emerald Fennell, Tobias Menzies, Josh O'Connor, and Sam Phillips	Won	
2020	Outstanding Performance by a Female Actor in a Drama Series	Gillian Anderson	Won	
2020	Outstanding Performance by a Female Actor in a Drama Series	Olivia Colman	Nominated	
2020	Outstanding Performance by a Female Actor in a Drama Series	Emma Corrin	Nominated	
2020	Outstanding Performance by a Male Actor in a Drama Series	Josh O'Connor	Nominated	
2022	Outstanding Performance by an Ensemble in a Drama Series	Elizabeth Debicki, Claudia Harrison, Andrew Havill, Lesley Manville, Jonny Lee Miller, Flora Montgomery, James Murray, Jonathan Pryce, Ed Sayer, Imelda Staunton, Marcia Warren, Dominic West, and Olivia Williams	Nominated	
2022	Outstanding Performance by a Female Actor in a Drama Series	Elizabeth Debicki	Nominated	
2023	Outstanding Performance by an Ensemble in a Drama Series	Khalid Abdalla, Sebastiana Blunt, Bertie Carvel, Salim Daw, Elizabeth Debicki, Luther Ford, Claudia Harrison, Lesley Manville, Ed McVey, James Murray, Jonathan Pryce, Imelda Staunton, Marcia Warren, Dominic West, and Olivia Williams	Nominated	
2023	Outstanding Performance by a Female Actor in a Drama Series	Elizabeth Debicki	Won	

== Set Decorators Society of America Awards ==
Year	Category	Nominee	Result	Ref.
2020	Best Achievement in Decor/Design of a One-Hour Period Series	Alison Harvey, Carolyn Boult, Sophie Coombes, and Martin Childs	Won	
2024	Best Achievement in Décor/Design of a One Hour Period Series	Alison Harvey, Carolyn Boult, Sophie Coombes, and Martin Childs	Nominated	

== Society of Composers and Lyricists Awards ==
Year	Category	Nominee	Result	Ref.
2020	Outstanding Original Score for Television Production	Martin Phipps	Nominated	
2023	Outstanding Original Score for Television Production	Martin Phipps	Nominated	

== Televisual Bulldog Awards ==
The awards range across drama, comedy, factual entertainment, entertainment, documentary, sport and more as well as craft categories including cinematography and music.

Year	Category	Nominee	Result	Ref.
2017	Best Drama Series	The Crown	Won	
2018	Best Drama Series	The Crown	Nominated	
2020	Best Drama Series	The Crown	Nominated	
2020	Best VFX Effects	The Crown	Nominated	
2021	Best Drama Series	The Crown	Won	
2021	Best VFX Effects	The Crown	Nominated	
2021	Best Music	Martin Phipps, The Crown	Won	

== Television and Radio Industries Club (TRIC) Awards ==
The TRIC Awards are awards presented by the Television and Radio Industries Club honouring achievement in television and radio.

Year	Category	Nominee	Result	Ref.
2017	Original OTT Streamed	The Crown	Nominated	
2018	Best UK Streamed Programme	The Crown	Nominated	

== Television Critics Association Awards ==
The TCA Awards are awards presented by the Television Critics Association in recognition of excellence in television.

Year	Category	Nominee	Result	Ref.
2017	Outstanding Achievement in Drama	The Crown	Nominated	
2017	Outstanding New Program	The Crown	Nominated	
2017	Individual Achievement in Drama	Claire Foy	Nominated	
2018	Outstanding Achievement in Drama	The Crown	Nominated	
2020	Outstanding Achievement in Drama	The Crown	Nominated	
2021	Outstanding Achievement in Drama	The Crown	Won	

== USC Scripter Awards ==
The USC Scripter Awards are presented annually by the University of Southern California to recognize the best in film adaptation.

Year	Category	Nominee	Result	Ref.
2023	Best Adapted Screenplay – Television	Peter Morgan (for "Couple 31")	Nominated	

== Visual Effects Society Awards ==
The American Visual Effects Society present the Visual Effects Society Awards to films, television shows, video games, and commercials with outstanding visual effects.

Year	Category	Nominee	Result	Ref.
2020	Outstanding Supporting Visual Effects in a Photoreal Episode	Ben Turner, Reece Ewing, David Fleet and Jonathan Wood (for "Aberfan")	Nominated	
2021	Outstanding Supporting Visual Effects in a Photoreal Episode	Ben Turner, Reece Ewing, Andrew Scrase and Jonathan Wood (for "Gold Stick")	Won	
2021	Outstanding Animated Character in an Episode or Real-Time Project	Ahmed Gharraph, Ross Burgess, Gabriela Ruch Salmeron and Joel Best (for "The Balmoral test; Imperial Stag")	Nominated	
2024	Outstanding Supporting Visual Effects in a Photoreal Episode	Ben Turner, Reece Ewing, Oliver Bersey, Joe Cork (for "Dis-Moi Oui")	Nominated	

== World Soundtrack Awards ==
Year	Category	Nominee	Result	Ref.
2017	Best TV Composer of the Year	Rupert Gregson-Williams,The Crown	Won	

== Writers Guild of America Awards ==
The Writers Guild of America Awards are awards for film, television, radio, and video game writing, including both fiction and non-fiction categories given by the Writers Guild of America, East, and Writers Guild of America, West, since 1949.

Year	Category	Nominee	Result	Ref.
2018	Drama Series	Tom Edge, Amy Jenkins, and Peter Morgan	Nominated	
2019	Drama Series	James Graham, David Hancock, and Peter Morgan	Nominated	
2019	Episodic Drama	Peter Morgan (for "Moondust")	Nominated	
2020	Drama Series	Peter Morgan and Jonathan Wilson	Won	
2023	Drama Series	Peter Morgan	Nominated	
2024	Drama Series	Peter Morgan	Nominated	
2024	Episodic Drama	Peter Morgan (for "Sleep, Dearie Sleep")	Nominated	
