= Ellacott =

Ellacott is a surname. Notable people with the surname include:

- Joan Ellacott (1920–2007), English costume designer
- Ken Ellacott (born 1959), Canadian ice hockey player
