= Elizabeth Waller =

Costume designer

Elizabeth Waller (born 1943 in Cheshire, England) is a British costume designer for theatre, television and film. She began her costume career in theatre, before joining the BBC costume team, where her period costume work was acclaimed for its attention to detail. Married to cinematographer Tony Pierce-Roberts since 1974, Waller is an Ambassador for The Bright Foundation, an arts education charity.

== Theatre design ==
Waller won a bursary to study Theatre Art and Design at Wimbledon School of Art, graduating in 1966. In September that year, as part of the Arts Council designer trainee programme, she started working as Assistant Designer at the Phoenix, Leicester, where she designed costume for Widowers Houses and Live Like Pigs.

Waller continued to design costumes for theatre productions while working at the BBC. In the late 1970s she designed 'striking' costumes for The Recruiting Officer at the Crucible in Sheffield, and later, a series of productions for Peter Hall Company in the late 1990s.

== Elizabeth R (1971) ==
By 1970, Waller was working at the BBC, where her early projects included adaptations of The Spoils of Poynton and She Stoops to Conquer. Waller was part of a new generation of BBC designers working for colour television, and were subsequently given the title and credit of 'costume designer', and provided with a distinct budget for creating garments. Before 1968 the job of dressing actors had been performed by the wardrobe supervisors, who mainly used stock costumes.

Waller's breakthrough project was the six-episode BBC series Elizabeth R, starring Glenda Jackson as the Tudor monarch, which aired in 1971. Waller's costumes for the series were painstaking recreations of Elizabeth's gowns as depicted in portraits, and were acclaimed for their authenticity and attention to detail. Elizabeth R, following the success of The Six Wives of Henry VIII the previous year, has been credited with establishing the BBC as "the pre-eminent maker of costume drama". At least six of the costumes in the series were based on specific portraits of Elizabeth I, including the paintings known as the Darnley portrait, the Phoenix portrait, the Armada portrait, and the Ditchley portrait. Waller was assisted in the reconstruction of these gowns by Jean Hunnisett, a masterful pattern cutter and dress historian.

Waller and Hunnsiett led a team of specialist craftspeople, using methods that approximated the appearance of the historic garments. Embroiderer Phyllis Thorold combined hand sewing with gold-thread chain-stitches created on a Cornely machine, to replicate Tudor couching.

Elizabeth Waller's costumes were acclaimed at the time. A selection of dresses from Elizabeth R were displayed at Hampton Court Palace in the summer of 1971; the exhibition was so popular that it was extended by two weeks. As further recognition of the costumes' success, the Phoenix dress was acquired by the London Museum for display and study. The patterns for the costumes were included in Hunnisett's book Period Costume for Stage & Screen, and her colleague Janet Arnold's Patterns of Fashion books.

Waller won the Emmy award for Outstanding Achievement in Costume Design in 1972 for her work, after Elizabeth R was broadcast as part of the Masterpiece Theatre series on PBS in the United States. This was the first time the BBC had ever been nominated for a costume Emmy. Waller was also presented with a Pye Award for excellence in costume for colour television.

The first episode of the series was shown at the BAFTA Heritage Screening event in 2016. And even fifty years after its first broadcast, commentators praised the "exquisite... level of historical accuracy" in Waller's costuming.

== Television ==
Waller continued to work for the BBC, dressing prestige dramas and long-running series; following the success of Elizabeth R, in 1975 Waller was assigned the serial Anna Karenina, for which she hired most of the costumes.

Waller took a turn costuming the popular science fiction series Doctor Who, taking on a four-episode arc in season 14 titled The Robots of Death (1977). Her costuming for the Doctor has been regarded as "sumptuous", with strong silhouette and wealth of detail.

Elizabeth Waller was nominated for three BAFTA Craft awards for costume design, and won once.

== Film projects ==
In For Your Eyes Only, released in 1981, Elizabeth Waller dressed Roger Moore as a fashionable but casual James Bond. His jackets were worn slightly oversized and half-unzipped to accentuate a broad chest and facilitate action.

Waller used London tailors to create realistic high-end clothing for Bond, including shirtmaker Frank Foster and, at the request of Roger Moore, his personal tailor Douglas Hayward. Waller's approach has been described as "much more classic" after the perceived excesses of the 1970s films.

Other film projects included The Company of Wolves (1984), a Red Riding Hood adaptation directed by Neil Jordan, featuring dream sequences of medieval werewolves, that demanded period and contemporary costuming from Waller. She stated that the costume budget was £20,000.

== BAFTA Awards and Nominations ==
Year	Category	Nominated work	Result	Ref.
British Academy Film Awards
1985	Best Costume Design	The Company of Wolves	Nominated	
British Academy Television Craft Awards
1984	Best Costume Design	Reilly, Ace of Spies	Nominated	
1992	Best Costume Design	Agatha Christie's Poirot (Programmes 1, 4, 5, 9, 10)	Nominated	
1993	Best Costume Design	The Camomile Lawn	Won	
