= The Essex Serpent (TV series) =

2022 television series

- Promotional poster
- Genre: Period drama
- Based on: The Essex Serpent by Sarah Perry
- Developed by: Anna Symon
- Directed by: Clio Barnard
- Starring: Claire Danes; Tom Hiddleston; Frank Dillane; Hayley Squires; Clémence Poésy; Jamael Westman; Michael Jibson; Gerard Kearns
- Composers: Dustin O'Halloran; Herdís Stefánsdóttir
- Country of origin: United Kingdom
- Original language: English
- No. of seasons: 1
- No. of episodes: 6

Production
- Executive producers: Clio Barnard; Anna Symon; Jamie Laurenson; Hakan Kousetta; Patrick Walters; Iain Canning; Emile Sherman
- Producer: Andrea Cornwell
- Cinematography: David Raedeker
- Editor: Lucia Zucchetti
- Running time: 47-50 minutes
- Production company: See-Saw Films

Original release
- Network: Apple TV+
- Release: 13 May – 10 June 2022

The Essex Serpent is a British Gothic romance period drama miniseries based on the novel of the same name by Sarah Perry. The series was written by Anna Symon, directed by Clio Barnard, and starred Claire Danes and Tom Hiddleston in the lead roles. It premiered on Apple TV+ on 13 May 2022.

== Premise ==
The Essex Serpent follows London widow Cora Seaborne (Claire Danes) who moves to Essex to investigate reports of a mythical serpent. She forms a surprising bond of science and scepticism with the local parson (Tom Hiddleston). When tragedy strikes, locals accuse her of attracting the creature.

== Cast and characters ==
- Claire Danes as Cora Seaborne
- Tom Hiddleston as Will Ransome
- Frank Dillane as Luke Garrett
- Clémence Poésy as Stella Ransome
- Hayley Squires as Martha
- Jamael Westman as Dr. George Spencer
- Lily-Rose Aslandogdu as Naomi Banks
- Gerard Kearns as Henry Banks
- Michael Jibson as Matthew Evansford
- Caspar Griffiths as Frankie Seaborne
- Dixie Egerickx as Jo Ransome
- Ryan Reffell as John Ransome
- Nitin Ganatra as Sir Charles Ambrose
- Christopher Fairbank as Cracknell
- Deepica Stephen as Sali
- Yaamin Chowdhury as Nev
- Greta Bellamacina as surgeon

== Episodes ==
No.	Title	Directed by	Written by	Original release date
1	"The Blackwater"	Clio Barnard	Anna Symon, Clio Barnard, Juliette Towhidi	13 May 2022
In Essex, a young woman wades into marshy water asking for forgiveness. She tells her young sister Naomi, watching from the shore, that she was tempted by the serpent. Frightened, Naomi runs away to the sound of Gracie's screams. In London, Dr Luke Garrett attends the opulent house of Michael Seaborne, who dismisses lifesaving surgery. Michael's wife Cora is comforted by her companion, Martha. Michael dies, and Cora informs their young son Frankie, who is unsure whether his mother is sad because she isn't crying. After the funeral, Cora sees a newspaper article about sightings of the Serpent and travels to Essex with Martha and Frankie to investigate. On arrival, she helps a man rescue a trapped sheep; he thanks her but tells her to go home as there is no Serpent. When invited to the vicarage for dinner, Cora discovers the man is local vicar Will Ransome — he apologises for his rudeness, but they continue to debate. Cora and Frankie get on particularly well with Will's wife Stella. In church, Cora has flashbacks to her husband's abusive violence and Will's sermon is interrupted so the congregation can search for Gracie in the marshes. Cora discovers Naomi cradling her sister's body.
2	"Matters of the Heart"	Clio Barnard	Anna Symon	13 May 2022
Mourners pay their respects to Gracie's family, but rumours spread that she was taken because of her sins. The villagers put up defences against the Serpent. Cora decides to stay and rents a cottage; Martha returns to London to collect their belongings. She shares the train journey with Luke and his colleague George Spencer as she discusses her socialist views. Luke performs a pioneering heart operation on Nev, a young immigrant. Martha explains that he is too poor to be able to recuperate properly and takes Spencer to visit Nev and sister Sali at home. After seeing the deprived conditions of the slum, Spencer agrees to help Martha try to persuade local MP Sir Charles Ambrose to help. Cora and Frankie meet Mr. Cracknell, who is shunned by the village because he doesn’t attend church. Frankie bonds with Stella, and Cora hints to Will about the abusive nature of her marriage. Cora attempts to explain fossils and evolution to the local schoolchildren, but when the Serpent is mentioned, they become hysterical. Naomi has a seizure. The children verbally turn on her and then begin fainting, one by one. Will's daughter Jo runs home but is unable to speak.
3	"Falling"	Clio Barnard	Jess Brittain	20 May 2022
Naomi's father Henry and other fishermen are attacked at sea by an unseen creature. Cora invites Luke to visit to see if he can provide a rational explanation for what happened at the school. Frankie spends time with Cracknell, learning to milk goats. Cora finds an exciting fossil in the cliffs, but on the way home, she is confronted by villagers who correlate her arrival with that of the Serpent. Will and Stella are worried about Jo's silence, and Cora consults Luke, who suggests hypnosis. At the vicarage, Stella consents to the treatment. Martha recommends waiting for Will, but Cora is indignant at needing a man’s permission. Under hypnosis, Jo talks fearfully about the Serpent. In church, Will comes across the curate in tears, praying. He accuses Will of not taking their fears seriously. The villagers light fires to banish the darkness and protect themselves. Will returns home, is furious when he sees Jo's emotional state, and sends Cora and Luke away. Martha tells Cora she must apologise to Will; Cora disagrees but leaves him a letter. He follows her outside and they argue passionately — Stella watches from the window as they kiss.
4	"Everything Is Blue"	Clio Barnard	Hania Elkington	27 May 2022
Luke throws a birthday party for Cora. As Cora chooses a dress, she carefully covers the scar on her neck inflicted by her husband. Will is reluctant to attend; Stella insists he attend. That same evening, Naomi searches the village for Will to confess her sins. At the party, Luke realises Stella is hiding a serious illness and advises her to see him in London as soon as possible. Will and Cora avoid each other, but Stella makes them dance, making their mutual attraction clear to everyone. The party quickly breaks up. Cora is unsettled and walks alone all night. Luke and Martha carry on drinking, sharing their frustrations about Will and Cora. They have sex, with Martha commenting that they are both thinking of Cora. Frankie wakes up, goes to see Cracknell, and then finds him lying concussed on the ground after falling down steps. Frankie lays down next to him and holds his hand as he dies. Naomi wades into the sea, holding Gracie's cross. In the morning, Luke leaves for London. Cora finds Frankie's muddy clothes and is troubled by his account of the night, especially the matter-of-fact way he tells of Cracknell’s death. Henry searches for Naomi but instead finds Cracknell's body. The frightened villagers are angry and turn on Cora as she attempts to help. Will follows Cora, declaring his love. They too have sex. Afterwards, Will prays tearfully in the empty church as Cora frantically packs and leaves with Martha and Frankie; meanwhile, the curate uses goats blood to paint crosses on the houses.
5	"I Break Things"	Clio Barnard	Elinor Cook	3 June 2022
As the search for Naomi continues, Stella reveals the seriousness of her illness to Will; her condition has worsened to the point where she is coughing up blood. The Ransomes travel to London to take up Luke on his offer of diagnosis at his hospital. Cora has confined herself to her bedchamber back in London. Unable to cope with the events at Aldwater, she finds herself in a heated exchange with Martha. When Luke diagnoses Tuberculosis at the hospital, Stella declines any form of treatment. Will takes the children to the Natural History Museum where he has a chance encounter with Cora that leaves her shaken. Luke agrees to accompany Cora and Martha to meet Charles in the slum if—in exchange—she accompanies him to a BMA party where he is due to receive an award. At the event, Luke declares his love for Cora and proposes to her only to be rejected. Hurt, he divulges the terminal nature of Stella's condition and accuses Cora of holding out until such a time that Will becomes available. In the aftermath, Cora returns home and ransacks the place while Luke finds himself attacked by a footpad at the railway station.
6	"Surfacing"	Clio Barnard	Anna Symon	10 June 2022
With her health fading fast, Stella reveals her wish to be reacquainted with Cora and Frankie. Will writes to Cora expressing the sentiment but indicates it would not be in anyone's interest for her to return to Essex. With his hand wounded, Luke's career as a surgeon appears all but over. When Cora learns of the calamity that has befallen Luke from Spencer, she agrees to visit; however, her offer of friendship is not enough for a forlorn Luke. Cora returns to Aldwater to see Stella, and the two women broach the subject of Will. While Cora goes to face Will in the churchyard, Stella takes Frankie to her boat and persuades him to cast her adrift so that she may finally meet either the serpent or her maker. With the boat sinking, Will swims out and rescues her. Hiding out in Cracknell's cottage, Naomi spots the carcass of a whale washed up in the estuary. Mistaking it for the Serpent, she returns home to declare the scourge is no more. Stella dies peacefully at home. Six months later, Cora and Will are reunited with the knowledge they would have had Stella’s blessing.

== Production ==
=== Development ===
In August 2020, it was reported that Apple gave a straight-to-series order for The Essex Serpent to See-Saw Films.

=== Casting ===
When The Essex Serpent was announced in August 2020, Keira Knightley was set to play the leading role of Cora as well as serving as executive producer, however in October 2020, she chose to leave the project due to "family reasons". In February 2021, Claire Danes signed on to play Cora replacing Knightley. Tom Hiddleston joined the cast the following month. In April, Frank Dillane, Hayley Squires, Clémence Poésy and Jamael Westman were added to the main cast.

=== Filming ===
Filming had been originally expected to commence in late November 2020 before Knightley exited the series. Filming for The Essex Serpent began in February 2021 in a number of Essex locations, including Alresford, Brightlingsea, North Fambridge and Maldon, as well as across London, including Gordon Square in Bloomsbury. Filming for the series concluded on the week of 27 June 2021.

== Reception ==
=== Critical response ===
The review aggregator website Rotten Tomatoes reported a 76% approval rating with an average rating of 7.1/10, based on 45 critic reviews. The website's critics' consensus reads, "Distinguished by biting performances and coiling ambience, The Essex Serpent is a highly accomplished Gothic romance." Metacritic, which uses a weighted average, has a score of 69 out of 100 based on 19 critics, indicating "generally favorable reviews".

=== Accolades ===
The series' costume designer, Jane Petrie, won the BAFTA TV Craft award for Best Costume Design for her work on The Essex Serpent. The miniseries was nominated for two Royal Television Society Craft & Design Awards for outstanding achievement, one for Design — Titles, and one for Production Management.
