= Odile Dicks-Mireaux =

British costume designer

- Occupation: Costume designer
- Years active: 1982–present

Odile Dicks-Mireaux is a British costume designer. Her work include productions for both cinema like the Academy Award-nominated films An Education (2009) and Brooklyn (2015) and television like the BBC One drama The Lost Prince and the HBO miniseries Chernobyl (2019), receiving an Emmy Award for the former and a BAFTA Craft Award for the latter.

== Career ==
Dicks-Mireaux studied theatre design at the Central School of Art and Design in London, United Kingdom. After leaving college she worked in fringe theatre with companies such as Pip Simmons and Belt and Braces.

In 1979, she joined BBC as an assistant, becoming a designer in 1982 working in several television productions from the network including eight episodes from the nineteenth season of the science fiction television series Doctor Who in 1982, the sitcom The Black Adder (1983), the miniseries Oscar (1985) and Melissa (1997) and the two-part series The Woman in White, receiving her first BAFTA nomination for Best Costume Design for the latter in 1998, she was nominated for the award again in 2000 and 2001 for Great Expectations and Gormenghast, respectively, winning for the former.

In 1996, she left BBC and went on to work in different feature films like Stephen Frears's thriller Dirty Pretty Things (2002), Fernando Meirelles's drama thriller The Constant Gardener (2005), Lone Scherfig's coming-of-age drama An Education (2009), for which she was nominated for the BAFTA Award for Best Costume Design and Dustin Hoffman's comedy-drama Quartet (2012).

She has also worked on television series such as BBC One's drama The Lost Prince, for which she won the Primetime Emmy Award for Outstanding Costumes for a Miniseries, Movie, or Special alongside Colin May in 2005, NBC's action drama The Philanthropist and the episode Richard II from BBC Two's The Hollow Crown in 2012 receiving her fourth BAFTA Craft Award nomination.

In 2015, she worked in John Crowley's romantic period drama Brooklyn, receiving several nominations, including for a BAFTA Film Award, a Critics' Choice Award and a Costume Designers Guild Award. In 2019, she worked on the HBO's historical miniseries Chernobyl about the disaster of the same name, for the costumes of the limited series she was nominated for the Primetime Emmy Award for Outstanding Period Costumes alongside Daiva Petrulyte, Holly McLean, Anna Munro and Sylvie Org and won her second BAFTA Television Craft Award.

Dicks-Mireaux also appears in Edgar Wright's upcoming psychological horror film Last Night in Soho and Tom George's upcoming mystery film See How They Run.

== Filmography ==
=== Film ===
Year	Title	Director	Notes
1994	Captives	Angela Pope	
2001	Buffalo Soldiers	Gregor Jordan	
2001	Kiss Kiss (Bang Bang)	Stewart Sugg	
2002	Dirty Pretty Things	Stephen Frears	
2004	If Only	Gil Junger	
2005	The Constant Gardener	Fernando Meirelles	
2006	Like Minds	Gregory J. Read	
2008	Dean Spanley	Toa Fraser	
2008	10,000 BC	Roland Emmerich	
2008	The Bank Job	Roger Donaldson	
2009	An Education	Lone Scherfig	
2010	London Boulevard	Ken Bruen	
2011	One Day	Lone Scherfig	
2012	Bel Ami	Declan Donnellan and Nick Ormerod	
2012	Quartet	Dustin Hoffman	
2014	A Long Way Down	Pascal Chaumeil	
2015	High-Rise	Ben Wheatley	
2015	Brooklyn	John Crowley	
2016	Denial	Mick Jackson	
2017	Goodbye Christopher Robin	Simon Curtis	
2017	Disobedience	Sebastián Lelio	
2017	The Sense of an Ending	Ritesh Batra	
2021	Last Night in Soho	Edgar Wright	
2022	See How They Run	Tom George	
2022	The Wonder	Sebastián Lelio	

=== Television ===
Year	Title	Notes
1982	Doctor Who	Episodes: "The Visitation" (four parts), "Castrovalva" (four parts)
1982–1984	Top of the Pops	Episodes: S19E13 to S19E24
1983	Grange Hill	Episodes: "New Faces", "On Trial", "Publication", "Rally"
1983	The Black Adder	Episodes: "The Foretelling", "Born to Be King", "The Archbishop", "The Queen of Spain's Beard", "Witchsmeller Pursuivant", "The Black Seal"
1984	Sharing Time	Episodes: "For Business Reasons", "High Hopes", "Oceans Apart"
1985	Oscar	Episodes: "De Profundis", "Trials", "Gilded Youth"
1986	The Happy Valley	TV movie
1986–1993	Screen Two	Episodes: "The Silent Twins", "Sweet as You Are", "My Sister-Wife", "The Clothes in the Wardrobe"
1988	Theatre Night	Episode: "The Miser"
1997	Melissa	Five episodes
1997	The Woman in White	
1998	A Certain Justice	
1999	Great Expectations	TV movie
2000	Cor, Blimey!	TV movie
2000	Gormenghast	Three episodes
2003	The Deal	TV movie
2003	The Lost Prince	TV movie
2009	The Philanthropist	Episodes: "Pilot", "Paris", "Kosovo"
2012	The Hollow Crown	Episode: "Richard II"
2019	Chernobyl	Five episodes

== Awards and nominations ==
Year	Award	Category	Work	Result	Ref.
1998	British Academy Television Awards	Best Costume Design	The Woman in White	Nominated	
2000	British Academy Television Craft Awards	Best Costume Design	Great Expectations	Won	
2000	Royal Television Society Craft & Design Awards	Costume Design - Drama	Gormenghast	Nominated	
2001	British Academy Television Craft Awards	Best Costume Design	Gormenghast	Nominated	
2003	Royal Television Society Craft & Design Awards	Costume Design - Drama	The Lost Prince	Won	
2005	Primetime Creative Arts Emmy Awards	Outstanding Costumes for a Miniseries, Movie, or Special	The Lost Prince	Won	
2009	British Academy Film Awards	Best Costume Design	An Education	Nominated	
2009	Qantas Film and Television Awards	Best Costume Design in a Feature Film	Dean Spanley	Won	
2013	British Academy Television Craft Awards	Best Costume Design	Richard II (The Hollow Crown)	Nominated	
2015	British Academy Film Awards	Best Costume Design	Brooklyn	Nominated	
2015	Critics' Choice Awards	Best Costume Design	Brooklyn	Nominated	
2015	Costume Designers Guild Awards	Excellence in Period Film	Brooklyn	Nominated	
2019	Primetime Creative Arts Emmy Awards	Outstanding Period Costumes	Chernobyl	Nominated	
2019	Costume Designers Guild Awards	Excellence in Period Television	Chernobyl	Nominated	
2019	Royal Television Society Craft & Design Awards	Costume Design - Drama	Chernobyl	Won	
2020	British Academy Television Craft Awards	Best Costume Design	Chernobyl	Won	
