= Jürgen Vsych =

American novelist

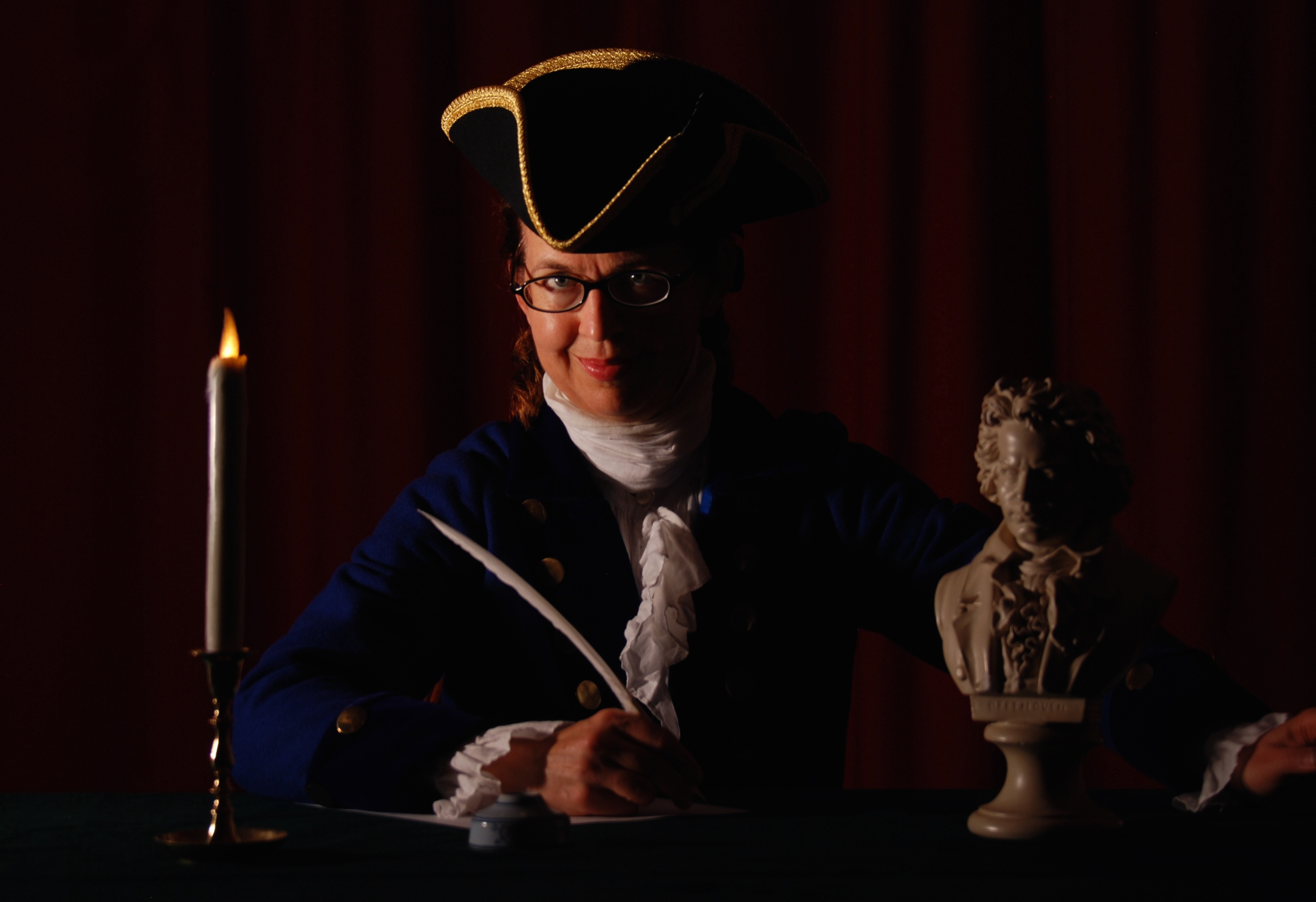
Jürgen Vsych, writer-director of historical action-adventures

Jürgen Vsych (/ˈjʊərɡən ˈvaɪzɪk/) is an American filmmaker and author, known as the writer-director of the films Pay Your Rent, Beethoven, which won the Prince's Trust Award, Son for Sail, Ophelia Learns to Swim, and Tyrannosaurus Tex. Her films have been shown in forty-nine film festivals in thirty countries. Vsych's journal was included in the book World Cinema: Diary of a Day.

Vsych is the author of The Wroughten Director and the historical novel Captain Death.

== Wroughten Movies ==
Wroughten Movies, Vsych's production company, derives from the word "wrought", and is also a wordplay on "rot." The company's motto is, "Not the same old rot."

In her autobiography, The Woman Director, Vsych writes: "When I was learning to read, I tried sounding out the name of a sign I saw on Venice Boulevard, 'WROUGHT IRON.' Mom said it was pronounced 'rot,' and it meant that the iron was very good, very well-crafted. Later that afternoon, I went to nursery school and painted with Matilda Gomez. When Matilda painted a really good picture of a boat, I said, 'That's wroughten.' She said, 'It is NOT!' and stabbed me in the eye with her paintbrush.".

== The Woman Director ==
The Woman Director

The Woman Director: The Adventures of a Really Independent Filmmaker Ages 6–36 by Jürgen Vsych is the first autobiography of an American female film director. It is only the third memoir ever written by a woman director (the other two are by Alice Guy Blache and Leni Riefenstahl), and it is the first written in English. It is based on Vsych's 17,256-paged diary and describes how she graduated from making one-minute Super 8 films financed with baby-sitting money and edited with her father's toenail clippers, to writing, directing & producing the 35mm feature film Ophelia Learns to Swim.

== Partial filmography ==
=== Writer-director-producer ===
- Ophelia Learns to Swim - starring Julia Lee, George Gray and Hilary Shepard
- Ralph Nader Crashes the Two Parties (2004, Nader for President 2004 Campaign Biography)
- Son for Sail starring John Vickery
- Pay Your Rent, Beethoven (1992) - Winner of The Prince's Trust Award.
- "The Music Scholarship" (1989)
- "Tyrannosaurus Tex" (1974)
- "Go To Your Tomb, Young Lady" (1973)
- "The Rocks Go On A Picnic" (1972)

== Bibliography ==
- Captain Death (2021) Historical novel
- The Woman Director (2006) autobiography, ISBN 0-9749879-0-5
- What Was Ralph Nader Thinking? (2008) biography of the consumer advocate and presidential candidate, ISBN 978-0-9749879-2-7
