= John Bloomfield and Ann Beverley =

Costume designers for British film, TV, and theatre

John Bloomfield (born 1942) and Ann Beverley (1939–2022), were a British costume design and illustration partnership, known for their work on The Six Wives of Henry VIII (1970), Robin Hood: Prince of Thieves (1991), and The Mummy franchise. During five decades of marriage and professional collaboration, they designed costumes for theatre, film and television in a variety of genres. They have been described as "central figures in British costume design".

Bloomfield was the more visible member of the partnership on film sets and for awards, though he's stated that "we just worked side by side in the whole of the preparation". Curators at the British Film Institute recognise that Ann's "full contribution is less well known". Costume designer Anna Wycoff has described their partnership as an "exquisite assemblage".

In 2022, Beverley and Bloomfield gifted their collection of original designs to the British Film Institute National Archive. This donation was celebrated in the exhibition Costume Design: The Alchemy of Ann and John Bloomfield (2022–23), held at the BFI Southbank.

== Early life and career ==
John Bloomfield was born in 1942 in Cwmgwrach, Wales. His family moved to Birmingham, where he studied for a Law degree. In 1961, the couple met at the Birmingham Repertory Theatre. Bloomfield had taken a part-time job as an assistant prop maker and scenic painter, and Beverley was working at Birmingham Rep as a costume and set designer. Beverley was brought up in London, and studied theatre design at Wimbledon College of Art and the Bristol Old Vic.

After jointly designing for touring theatre productions, Ann joined Television Wales and the West (TWW) in 1962. A few years later, in 1968, John joined the BBC as costume designer in the Corporation's newly expanded costume department.

The couple continued to work on theatre productions throughout Bloomfield's tenure at the BBC, including designing Gogol's The Government Inspector for the opening of the Sherman Theatre in Cardiff in 1973.

Ann started to officially work freelance for the BBC from 1974, and also taught on the Theatre Design course at Wimbledon School of Art.

== The Six Wives of Henry VIII ==
One of Bloomfield's earliest jobs at the BBC was designing costumes for The Six Wives of Henry VIII (1970), one of the first BBC period dramas to be broadcast in colour. The six-episode series was "hugely successful" and marked the beginning of a series of high-budget period costume productions that would cement the BBC's reputation internationally.

According to the head of the BBC's costume department, Peter Shepherd, Bloomfield had eight months preparation time for the series, in order to visit the V&A and National Portrait Gallery for research, and then start sourcing costumes from costume houses, "only to find we had been pipped at the post by the film Anne of the Thousand Days. There wasn't a thing in any of them and we had no Tudor in stock because we hadn't done any". So the principal costumes were made in the BBC workrooms, using "theatrical methods". Bloomfield drew upon his experience as a prop maker, using household objects such as curtain rings, lock fittings, screws and rice to create extravagant costume jewellery. The entire costume budget was £12,500.

Each episode of the series centred on a different Queen, and each was dressed in a distinctive colour palette. Working with historic dress researchers Janet Arnold and Jean Hunnisett to create the period silhouette, Bloomfield and Beverley sourced and enhanced the fabrics using net curtains, bleach and felt tip markers to create the appliance of Tudor velvet and brocade.

The couple's designs on paper for The Six Wives consolidated an approach they would follow for the rest of their career: they jointly sketched character and costume drawings, passing the design back-and-forth between them, and then they used paper torn from magazines to collage in colours and textures.

=== Reception and exhibition ===
John Bloomfield was awarded a BAFTA for Best Costume for The Six Wives of Henry VIII.

Following the success of the programme on television, the costumes for The Six Wives were displayed at the Victoria & Albert Museum in 1971. The exhibition "broke all attendance records in the history of the museum", according to The Stage newspaper at the time. An average of 2500 visitors came each day to see the costumes, with a total of 200,000 people attending the exhibit.

The Six Wives costume designs were again publicly displayed in the exhibition Six Lives: The Stories of Henry VIII’s Queens, held at London's National Portrait Gallery in 2024. A review of the exhibition in The Times commented, "the pair conjured up sweeping sleeves and cloth-of-gold from collaged paper torn from the weekend newspaper supplements". Sir Kenneth Bloomfield, Head of The BBC Audit Committee and John's cousin, recalled seeing designs for The Six Wives hanging in the offices at BBC Television Centre.

=== Henry VIII and His Six Wives ===
The television show was subsequently developed into the movie Henry VIII and His Six Wives (1972). The film had an entirely different cast apart from Keith Michel as Henry VIII, and all the costumes were re-designed. Working with a much bigger budget, the costumes were less theatrical, and were designed for big screen presentation. Recent critics have applauded the historic accuracy and details: "what was on screen was right out of a portrait".

== BBC costume department ==
Bloomfield and Beverley followed the success of The Six Wives with numerous costume drama series including Casanova (1971), Bel Ami (1971), The Onedin Line (1973) and Poldark (1975). One of the pair's collaged costume designs for Margaret Courtenay in Bel Ami resides in the permanent collection of the V&A Museum.

In 1977, Bloomfield replaced James Acheson as the chief costume designer for Doctor Who, and he went on to design ten episodes of the series. For The Talons of Weng Chiang, the Doctor's costume "picked up on Sherlock Holmes and Jack the Ripper motifs", including deerstalker hat. Principal cast had their costumes made for them, and all additional costumes were hired from Bermans & Nathans costume house, or found in the BBC's wardrobe store.

== Costume design for film ==
In 1978 John Bloomfield left the BBC to concentrate on designing costumes for film.

Throughout the 1980s, Bloomfield and Beverley developed their collaborative approach to working on large scale action and fantasy productions, including Conan the Barbarian (1982), Conan the Destroyer (1984) and Superman IV: The Quest for Peace (1987).

Chistopher Reeve's Superman costume from Superman IV: The Quest for Peace (1987) is in the permanent collection of the Smithsonian National Museum of American History. Another is in the collection of the Victoria and Albert Museum, currently on display at the Young V&A and previously displayed in the 2012 exhibition Hollywood Costume .

The BFI have stated that, "despite increasingly large budgets their process remained intricate, personal and rooted in their early training, nearly always starting with the sketch". In 1993 Bloomfield and Beverley were invited to join the Costume Designers Guild – John as a designer and Ann as an illustrator.

Their work in the 1990s included multiple projects with director Kevin Reynolds, and actor/director Kevin Costner. This extended collaboration started with Robin Hood Prince of Thieves (1991), which was nominated for the BAFTA best costume award that year. Other Reynolds films with costumes by Bloomfield and Beverley included, Rapa Nui (1994) and Waterworld (1995). Costner brought the pair in to design costumes on his directing projects The Postman (1997) and Open Range (2003).

During the production of Rapa Nui, Bloomfield kept a diary for the BFI publication World Cinema: Diary of a Day, which celebrated the centenary of cinema. In June 1993, shooting on Easter Island, he recorded waking up at 5.30am to dress two hundred extras under the cover of two "large Chilean army tents", ready to start shooting at 9.00am.

Bloomfield's journal while costuming the film Space Truckers (1996) recorded the period of negotiation at the outset of a new project, and the way that the partnership worked: "Drive to London for meeting... Ann comes with me – she is likely to work on this film ... so I have her involved from the beginning". A few days later, the couple scouted scrapyards for "personal rescue equipment and webbing, helmets etc" to use in their costumes.

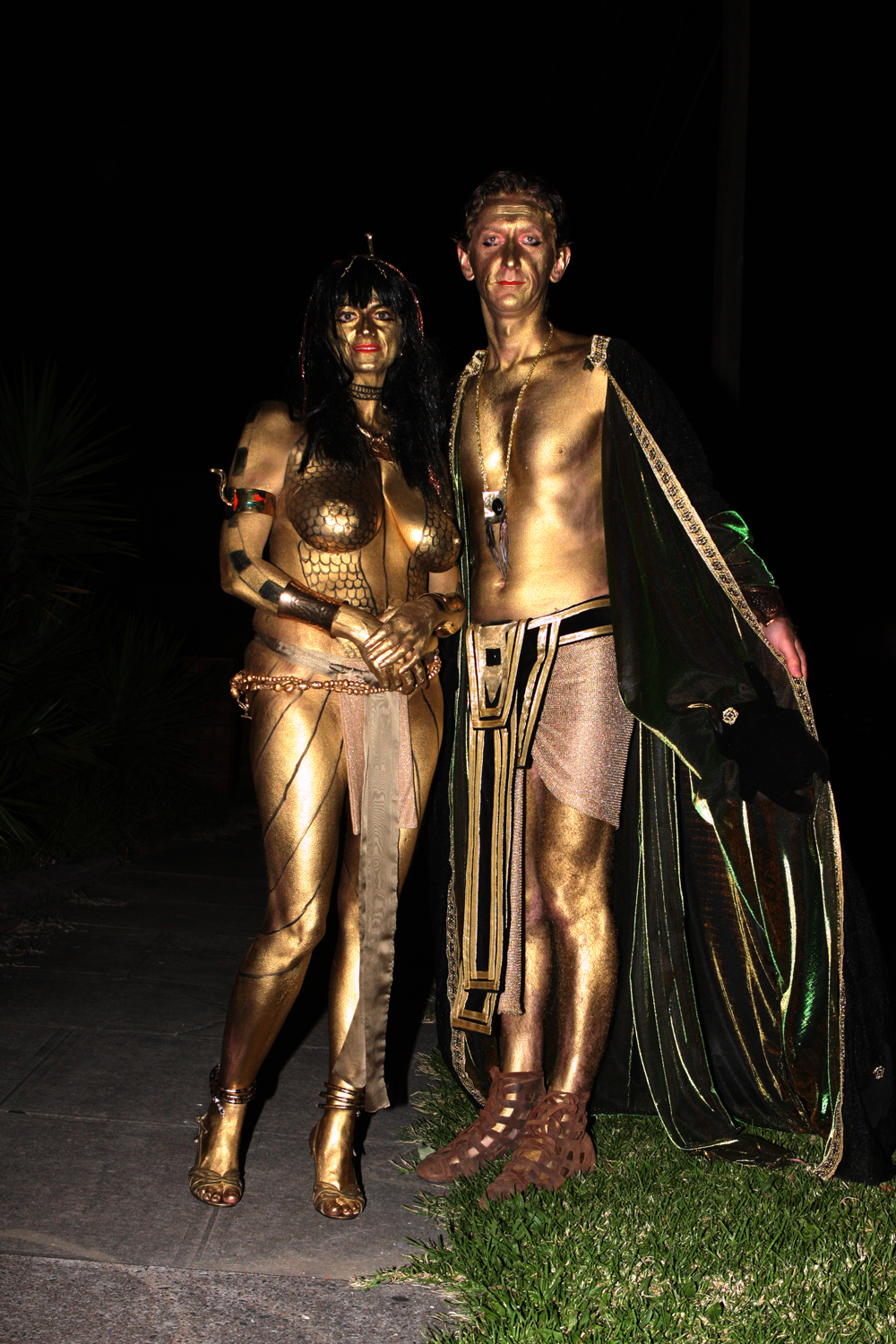
Fans of The Mummy recreate costumes designed by John Bloomfield and Ann Beverley.

=== The Mummy franchise ===
John Bloomfield and Ann Beverley designed costumes for the Universal remake of The Mummy (1999), starring Rachel Weisz and Brendan Fraser as plucky archeologists. Film critics have noted "Bloomfield didn't restrict himself to only using period costumes", but was "much more interested in what the characters would want to wear" – resulting in "very sexy" costumes that combined late-1990s styles with 1920s touches. They also designed the costumes for the following two films in the franchise: The Mummy Returns (2001) and The Scorpion King (2002).

In the 2010s and 20s, The Mummy developed a significant online fandom, often centring on the costumes (and nudity) of the film's main characters. Numerous blogs provide detailed break-downs of the costume plot with links to purchase replicas. Others have created Instructable posts, recreating key looks, such as Evie's "librarian" ensemble. The internet culture website Know Your Meme documents several memes that play with the sexuality of the Mummy's characters.

== Awards and nominations ==
Year	Work	Award	Category	Result	Ref
1971	The Six Wives of Henry VIII	BAFTA Television Awards		Won	
1978	She Fell Among Thieves	BAFTA TV Craft Awards	Best Costume Design	Nominated	
1982	Conan the Barbarian	Saturn Award	Best Costume Design	Nominated	
1992	Robin Hood: Prince of Thieves	ACCA Awards	Best Costume Design	Nominated	
1992	Robin Hood: Prince of Thieves	Saturn Award	Best Costume Design	Nominated	
1992	Robin Hood: Prince of Thieves	BAFTA Film Awards	Best Costume Design	Nominated	
1995	Waterworld	Saturn Award	Best Costume Design	Nominated	
1997	The Hunchback of Notre Dame	Primetime Emmy	Outstanding Costume Design for a Miniseries or Special	Nominated	
1999	The Mummy	Saturn Award	Best Costume Design	Nominated	

== Personal life ==
John Bloomfield and Ann Beverley married in 1964, and they had two children and three grandchildren. For most of their career they lived in South London, later moving out to East Surrey.

Ann was diagnosed with vascular dementia and Alzheimer's disease in 2017, and she died in 2022.
