= Jean Hunnisett =

Costume historian, designer, and maker (1930–2003)

- Born: Jean Gore; 1930; Leigh, Lancashire, England
- Died: 19 May 2003 (aged 72–73); Poole, Dorset

Jean Hunnisett (née Gore; 1930–2003) was a costume historian, designer, and maker. She was the author of a series of books on historical costume.

== Early life and education ==
Jean Gore was born in Leigh, Lancashire, and attended Bedford Methodist and Manchester Road Secondary School. After leaving school at sixteen, she worked in Manchester. She was a keen theatre-goer and designed costumes and props for the Kendall Milne Department Store amateur theatrical group. In the mid-1950s she married orchestra bassoonist Tom Hunnisett.

== Career ==
While studying acting at the Oxford Playhouse School, Hunnisett took a job as Wardrobe Mistress at the theatre, she moved to the Westminster Theatre Company, then in 1955 she started working in wardrobe at the Old Vic in London, and in 1957 started to work for Sadlers' Wells Theatre Ballet.

After several seasons touring with theatre and ballet, Hunnisett started working for the BBC at Lime Grove, and then Television Centre. She started to make historical costumes based upon genuine garments in the collection of the Victoria & Albert Museum, London. In 1961 she started working freelance as Ladies' Cutter for Glyndebourne opera and for Boston Opera in the United States.

Hunnisett was involved in two landmarks of BBC period costuming: the BBC series The Six Wives of Henry VIII, for which Hunnisett made all six wives' costumes, designed by John Bloomfield and Ann Beverley. This was followed in 1970 by Elizabeth R., a biopic miniseries about Queen Elizabeth I spanning 1495–1603 (starring Glenda Jackson and with designs by Elizabeth Waller). Again, Hunnisett used original garments and period tailor's books from the V&A collection to achieve period authenticity. Later costume commentators have described Elizabeth R as "the gold standard against which all historical TV and most historical movies should be judged".

In 1975, Hunnisett opened her own workroom and built a team of makers to supply theatre, film and television productions. Her film credits during this period included The Slipper and the Rose (1976), Joseph Andrews (1977), The Riddle of the Sands (1979) and The Corn is Green (1979). In 1980, she worked with the designer Erté for Glyndebourne's production of Der Rosenkavalier. Writing about the experience a decade later, she recalled the ambitious scale of Erté's designs, and his attention to technical detail.

Writing in 1986, Hunnisett described the knowledge and skills required by a period costume maker: "You need a pictorial reference to widen your understanding of the period; ideas of colour, quality and types of fabric that would be ideal; a good set of measurements; some idea of the shape of the pattern pieces you are going to cut out, and a knowledge of how to make a well constructed garment".

== Period Costume books ==
Hunnisett authored the "Period Costume" series of books that detailed the construction of garments from medieval to modern times. The books include scaled-down patterns and instructions for production. Her aims, she wrote, were to "help... achieve higher standards of cut, construction, and the period-feel".

Over time, Hunnisett's books achieve the status of textbooks for costume makers. Reviewing the fifth book in the series, Laura Ewald wrote, "it is difficult to imagine a period costume resource more useful than this". In 2010, dress historian David Wilcox wrote that Hunnisett's books "are valued for their reliability, much like a Delia Smith cookbook, producing an acceptable version of period dress".

- Period costume for stage and screen: patterns for women's dress 1500-1800. Bell & Hyman, 1986. ISBN 978-0-7135-2660-8
- Period costume for stage and screen : patterns for women's dress 1800-1909. Players Press, 1991. ISBN 978-0-88734-609-5
- Period costume for stage and screen: patterns for women's dress Medieval-1500. Players Press, 1996. ISBN 978-0-88734-653-8
- Period Costume for Stage and Screen: Outer Garments, Book I: Cloaks, Capes, Stoles and Wadded Mantles. Players Press, 2000. ISBN 978-0-88734-665-1
- Period Costume for Stage & Screen: Patterns for Outer Garments, Book II: Dominos, Dolmans, Coats, Pelisses, Spencers, Calashes, Hoods, and Bonnets. Players Press, 2003. ISBN 978-0-88734-670-5

== Costume Society ==
Hunnisett was an early member of the Costume Society for the study and preservation of historic dress. Hunnisett's early projects for the Society included advising the Wellcome Collection on nurses' uniforms.

In 1995, Hunnisett was the second person in the role of Hon. Symposia Co-ordinator.

== Death ==
Hunnisett died on 19 May 2003 at Poole General Hospital.
