= Raymond Hughes (costume designer) =

British costume designer

- Born: 1937; Bangor, Wales
- Died: 16 December 2015 (aged 77–78)
- Occupation: Costume designer

Raymond Wansker Hughes (1937–2015) was a British costume designer for television and film, active from the 1960s to 2000s. As head costume designer for the BBC he designed many series including The Pallisers (1974), for which he won an Emmy award, and Doctor Who (1977). In the 1980s he costumed a number of American TV series and designed costume for film, including Return to Oz (1985).

Raymond Hughes grew up in Llanfairfechan, Wales. He had a talent for drawing, and worked as a draughtsman in the local quarry after leaving school. At the encouragement of his former headmaster, Hughes applied to Liverpool College of Art, and studied theatre design. His first jobs after graduation were at the Everyman Theatre in Liverpool and the Library Theatre in Manchester.

== Career ==
=== BBC productions ===
Raymond Hughes joined the BBC costume department in 1966.

By the 1970s, Hughes was promoted to head costume designer. At the time, the BBC was an integrated studio with an in-house costume store and makers, and designers were assigned to a wide range of television series and specials.

In 1974, Raymond Hughes designed the costumes for The Pallisers, an adaptation of Anthony Trollope's epic novel. Costume designer Deidre Clancy described his work on the series as "sumptuously elegant" and credited Hughes with "taking a completely fresh look at the nineteenth century world without feeling the need to stylise it for a contemporary audience". After the series aired on the BBC, Hughes's costumes were exhibited at Longleat House. Hughes's costumes for The Pallisers also received the Emmy award for best costumes for a drama series in 1977, after it was broadcast on CBS.

In 1977 Hughes designed the costumes for The Invisible Enemy, a four-part Doctor Who serial. Hughes was assigned to the project because it was the most special-effects intensive series of Doctor Who so far, and as a senior designer, Hughes (and fellow veteran production designer Barry Newbury) had the experience and influence to make it work. The director Derrick Goodwin said in a later interview that he was "terribly lucky" to have Hughes on board. One of the enemy creatures was modelled on a prawn, so Hughes designed a fibreglass shell that would be worn over the actor John Scott Martin, kneeling on a wheeled trolley.

In the early 1980s, the BBC produced a series of the complete works of Shakespeare, and Raymond Hughes took on costuming King Lear. The director Jonathan Miller chose to set the play in Renaissance, in continuity with other programmes in the series, and Hughes provided "solidly realistic seventeenth century costumes", which approached uniform simplicity for the men. Wearing a wimple and a stylist crown of thorns, his Cordelia appeared nun-like, whereas her sisters Goneril and Regan have bodices decorated with "naughty images" of Adam and Eve. Many characters are adorned with plain white ruffs, which "put a strong focus on the faces of the actors" and isolated them in close-up.One criticism of Hughes's designs was that the stripped-back costumes appeared "standard-issue", which they may have been, sourced from the BBC's well-stocked wardrobe.

=== Freelance career ===
After sixteen years at the BBC, Hughes left to work freelance in 1984. His first project was Far Pavilions, a three-part miniseries for HBO adapted from a recent novel set in India. The series reportedly required 5000 costumes and involved 1000 extras. Stand-out garments from Hughes's "stunning costuming blazonry" included an elaborate wedding gown of plum red silk embroidered in gold.

For Master of the Game, another mini-series adaptation of a popular novel, Hughes designed costumes spanning generations of family history – similar to his work on The Pallisers, though this time set on America's East Coast. Television critic Gail Williams complimented the "hundreds of dazzling costumes" in the series, though with the reservation that "[Dyan] Cannon's costumes are so gorgeous throughout that they sometimes draw attention to themselves, though, rather than accentuate the character".

In late 1984, Hughes began work designing costumes for Return to Oz (released 1985), a Disney film with "very lavish sets and costumes". According to wardrobe supervisor Eileen Sullivan, Hughes was respected among the costume department for his many "top awards" and was considered "exalted company".

Throughout the 1990s, Hughes continued to work on lavish period television series, including Jekyll and Hyde (1990) starring Michael Caine and Frankenstein (1992) with Randy Quaid. In 1994, Gerry Anderson brought Hughes in to design costumes for the science fiction series Space Precinct 2040, which featured stylised police uniforms and alien creature creations.

== Awards and nominations ==
Award	Year	Category	Work	Result	Ref.
BAFTA TV Craft Awards	1978	Best Costume Design	Machbeth	Nominated	
BAFTA TV Craft Awards	1980	Best Costume Design	Prince Regent	Nominated	
BAFTA TV Craft Awards	1985	Best Costume Design	The Far Pavilions	Nominated	
Emmy Awards	1977	Outstanding Achievement In Costume Design For A Drama Or Comedy Series	The Pallisers	Won	
