= Evangeline Harrison =

British costume designer for film and television

Evangeline Harrison, also known as Vangie Harrison and Evangeline Averre, is a British costume designer with over forty credits in television and film. Her best-known works include Get Carter (1971), Superman III (1983) and the series Bramwell (1995–98). She was nominated for a BAFTA TV Craft award for Best Costume Design for Churchill: The Wilderness Years in 1982.

Born in 1934, Evangeline studied at Ealing Art School, and then the Central School of Art in London. Her early theatre work included a summer season at Stratford-Upon-Avon and a longer period at Glyndebourne opera. She then started to design costumes for commercials. Harrison's first film costume design work was as assistant to Jocelyn Rickards on Blow Up (1966).

== Costume design career ==
Harrison's notable costume design projects include:

- Get Carter (1971), in which Harrison paid homage to film noir through "attentive design and costume work".
- The Picture of Dorian Gray at Greenwich Theatre (1975)
- The Ritz (1976 dir. Richard Lester), an adaptation from stageplay to film.
- Love for Lydia, a TV miniseries shown on ITV in 1977. Reviewer Patrick Campbell said "a great deal of the credit" for the show’s success must go to Harrison and co-designer May Patley "for the authenticity of the period ... the splendid costumes ... the meticulous attention to detail and the loving research".
- Winston Churchill: The Wilderness Years (1981), starring Siân Philips as Churchill's wife Clementine. Harrison used mostly original 1930s dresses for Philip’s 52 costume changes.
- A Christmas Carol (1984) . Harrison's costumes for this Dickens adaptation used many details from the story’s Victorian illustrator, John Leech. The New York Times observed, “Edward Woodward’s Ghost of Christmas Present, in particular, is the very image of the book’s rather bacchanalian figure in flowing royal robes and crown”.
- Lady Chatterley (1993) was a miniseries adaptation of D H Lawrence’s novel, starring Joely Richardson in the title role and directed by Ken Russell.

== Personal life ==
In 1958, she married art director and production designer Philip Harrison. They later divorced. In 2001 she married sound supervisor John Ralph.
