= World Cinema: Diary of a Day =

Collection of journals

- Editor: Peter Cowie
- Subject: Filmmaking
- Publisher: Overlook Books
- Publication date: 1995
- ISBN: 0879515732
- Dewey Decimal: 791.43
- LC Class: PN1994

World Cinema: Diary of a Day is a 1995 collection of journals from filmmakers around the world. It includes entries from filmmakers as famous as Terry Gilliam to accomplished but little-known independents, such as Jurgen Vsych.
