= Sarah Perry =

English author (born 1979)

Sarah Perry FRSL
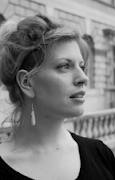
- Born: 28 November 1979 (age 46); Chelmsford, Essex, England
- Education: Royal Holloway, University of London, Chelmsford County High School for Girls
- Occupation: Writer

Chancellor of the University of Essex
- Incumbent
- Assumed office 1 August 2023
- Vice Chancellor: Anthony Forster
- Preceded by: John Bercow (2021)
- Website: www.sarahperry.net

Sarah Grace Perry FRSL (born 28 November 1979) is an English author. She has had four novels published: After Me Comes the Flood (2014), The Essex Serpent (2016), Melmoth (2018) and Enlightenment (2024). Her work has been translated into 22 languages. She was appointed Chancellor of the University of Essex in July 2023, officially starting in this role on 1 August 2023.

== Early life and education ==
Perry was born, the youngest of five sisters, in Chelmsford, Essex, into a family of devout Christians who were members of a Strict Baptist church. Growing up with almost no access to contemporary art, culture, and writing, she filled her time with classical music, classic novels and poetry, and church-related activities. She says this early immersion in old literature and the King James Bible profoundly influenced her writing style. She attended Chelmsford County High School for Girls. She graduated from Anglia Polytechnic University (now Anglia Ruskin University) with a degree in English Literature, then worked briefly in the Civil Service.

Perry has a PhD in creative writing from Royal Holloway University where her supervisor was Sir Andrew Motion. Her doctoral thesis was on the Gothic in the writing of Iris Murdoch, and Perry has subsequently published an article on the Gothic in Aeon magazine.

I wrote about the power of place in my PhD thesis, particularly the importance of buildings in the Gothic (a genre which I find myself inhabiting without ever having meant to). Fiction in the Gothic inheritance makes much of the potent importance of the interior, from the castle where Jonathan Harker finds himself holed up to Thornfield, and from the suburban homes in Hilary Mantel's Beyond Black to the ghastly crypts in The Monk.

== Career ==
Perry won the 2004 Shiva Naipaul Memorial prize for travel writing for 'A little unexpected', an article about her experiences in the Philippines.

In 2013, she was a writer-in-residence at Gladstone's Library.

In June 2018, Perry was elected Fellow of the Royal Society of Literature in its "40 Under 40" initiative. In October 2019 she was awarded the title of Honorary Doctor of Letters by Anglia Ruskin University.

In 2020, she wrote a short 96-page book about the existing stereotype about the hometown Essex, entitled Essex Girls.

Her 2025 book Death of an Ordinary Man was longlisted for the 2026 Women's Prize for Non-Fiction.

== Personal life ==
Perry currently resides in Norwich, Norfolk. She married her husband Robert Perry at the age of 20. She does not have children and has spoken publicly regarding her experience of suffering a miscarriage and the subsequent journey of being unable to conceive.

As of 2025, Perry states she has come to terms with being child-free and enjoys the opportunity it allows her to focus on her writing and other passions.

== Novels ==
=== After Me Comes the Flood ===
Perry's debut novel, After Me Comes the Flood, was released in 2014 by Serpent's Tail, receiving high praise from reviewers including those of The Daily Telegraph and The Guardian. The novel, which is set in Norfolk, tells the story of a man named John Cole who wanders into a strange world while seeking out his brother amidst a drought. John Burnside, writing for The Guardian, called it "extraordinary" and "a remarkable debut".

Holly Williams, reviewing for the Independent, also praised the novel "a gripping, memorable, impressive debut."

=== The Essex Serpent ===
Regarded as Perry's commercial breakthrough, her second book The Essex Serpent was also published by Serpent's Tail, in 2016. Inspired by the myth of a sea serpent on the Essex coast, it tells the story of a Victorian widow, Cora Seaborne, and the friends who surround her after the death of her bullying husband. Cora is intrigued and compelled by the possibility of the serpent's return, but clashes with the local vicar, William Ransome, who is determined to lay superstition to rest in his rural parish.

The novel is again written in a gothic style, and explores themes of goodness, friendship, superstition, and love and once again received positive reviews; John Burnside, quoted on the book's cover, writes: "Had Charles Dickens and Bram Stoker come together to write the great Victorian novel, I wonder if it would have surpassed The Essex Serpent? No way of knowing, but with only her second outing, Sarah Perry establishes herself as one of the finest fiction writers working in Britain today."

The Essex Serpent was nominated in the Novel category for the 2016 Costa Book Awards and was named Waterstones Book of the Year 2016. It also won Fiction Book of the Year at the 2017 British Book Awards. It was placed on the long list for the 2017 Baileys Women's Prize for Fiction. It was adapted for a limited series on Apple TV+ in 2022.

=== Melmoth ===
Her third novel is titled Melmoth, and was inspired by Charles Maturin's gothic novel Melmoth the Wanderer. It was published by Serpent's Tail in October 2018.

Reviews for Melmoth were positive, with Alex Preston (writing for The Observer) praising it: "Melmoth is a good book, one that, for all its uncanny shudders, comes from a place of decency and good faith, a beacon against the darkest times. Perry’s masterly piece of postmodern gothic is one of the great literary achievements of our young century and deserves all the prizes and praise that will be heaped upon it." Melmoth was shortlisted for the 2019 Dylan Thomas Prize.

=== Enlightenment ===
Perry's fourth novel, Enlightenment, was published by Cape in May 2024. The Times Literary Supplement called it an "uplifting perspective on the relationship between faith and facts" and "a delicate piece of misdirection." It was longlisted for the 2024 Booker Prize.

Academic offices
Vacant Title last held by John Bercow	Chancellor of the University of Essex; 2023-	Incumbent
