= Jane Petrie =

Scottish costume designer

Jane Petrie is a Scottish costume designer, best known for her work in independent film and television. She has designed costumes for productions such as Moon (2009), Suffragette (2015), and The Essex Serpent (2022). Her costume designs for The Crown (Season 2, 2018) received Emmy and Costume Designers Guild awards for best period costumes.

== Early life and education ==
Jane Petrie was born and grew up in Newport-on-Tay, Fife, Scotland. She became interested in historical costume design after a visit to the Victoria and Albert Museum at the age of ten, and after a short spell as a youth worker, she studied costume design at Wimbledon School of Art. After graduation, Petrie worked at Sands Films in Rotherhithe as a costume maker before moving into freelance film costume work.

== Career ==
=== Early film work ===
In the late 1990s, Petrie worked in wardrobe departments for various films, a role that involves dressing actors, managing costume logistics, and maintaining continuity during filming. Her credits as wardrobe mistress or supervisor include Oscar and Lucinda (1997), The Land Girls (1998), Elizabeth (1998), Notting Hill (1999) and Star Wars Episode 1: The Phantom Menace (1999).

In the following years, Petrie became an assistant costume designer, which involved supporting designers with pulling costumes, doing historical research, and buying fabric and garments. Petrie's credits as assistant include Captain Corelli’s Mandolin (2001), Buffalo Soldiers (2001), and The Constant Gardener (2005)

Throughout this period, Petrie was also involved in vintage fashion and interior design, running a stall at Portobello Market.

=== Costume design ===
In the independent science fiction film Moon (2009), Petrie created costumes for Sam Rockwell as a lonely space labourer, and incorporated narrative hints, such as the T-shirt printed "Wake me up when it's quitting time". Reviewers noted that Petrie's designs avoided "the fantastical elements of sci-fi ... while still evoking the spirit of genre classics such as 2001: A Space Odyssey (1968), Solaris (1972), Outland (1981) and in particular Silent Running (1972) and Alien (1979)". Petrie employed creative breakdown techniques to age and distress the costumes, and enhance the realism of the spacecraft on screen.

The same year, Petrie collaborated with director Andrea Arnold on the film Fish Tank (2009). Petrie worked with the film's young actors to develop naturalistic wardrobe choices that aligned with the film's social realism.

Petrie turned to television costume design for the series Top Boy (2011), which has been described as "one of the few important documents of life in modern Britain”, and recognised for the realism and grittiness of its portrayal of life in East London – costume was an important part of the show's look and characterisation. Also in 2011, Petrie designed costume for two episodes of the debut season of Black Mirror: The National Anthem and Fifteen Million Merits. Petrie returned to the series in 2016 for the episode Playtest.

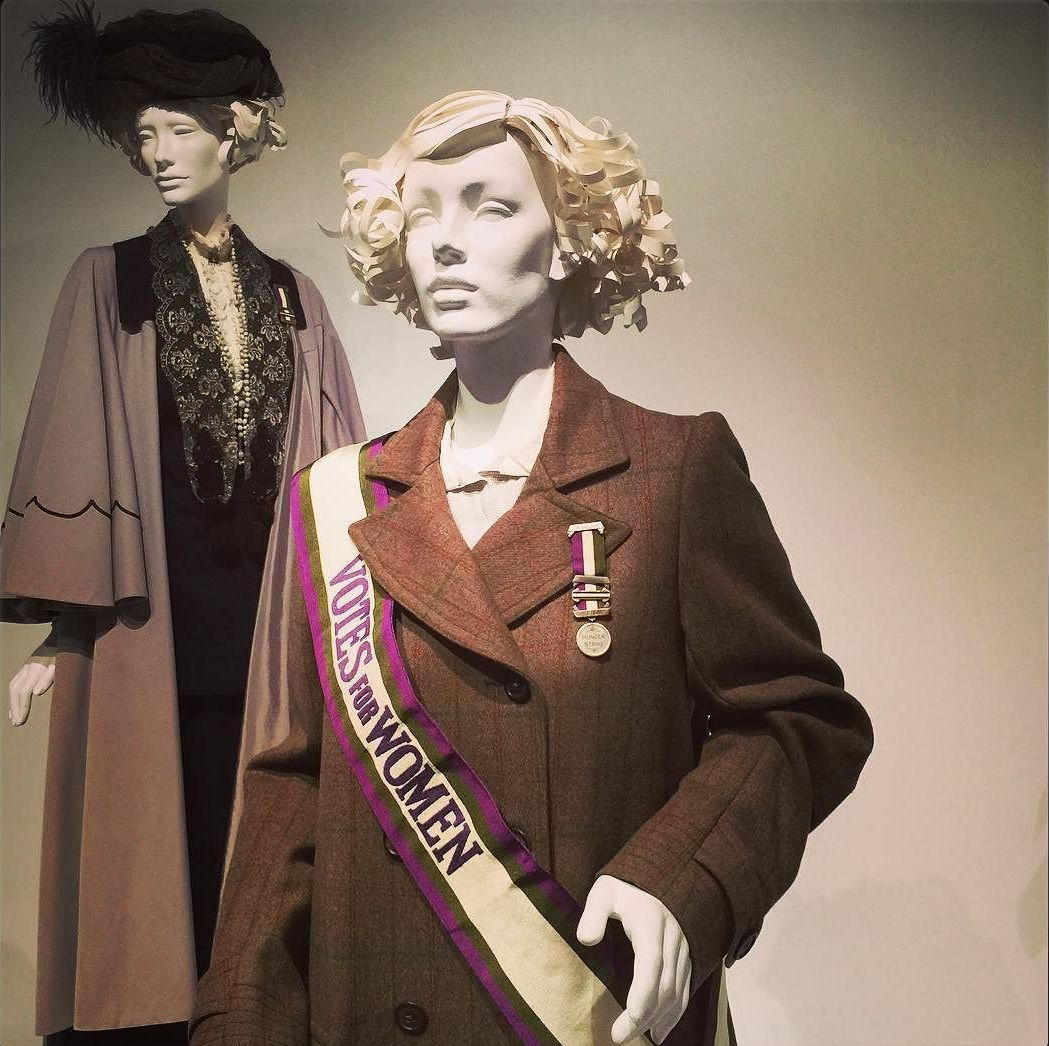
Costumes for the film Suffragette (2015), designed by Jane Petrie.

Jane Petrie's costume designs for the period political drama Suffragette (2015), starring Carey Mulligan, Meryl Streep and Helena Bonham Carter, used original Edwardian clothing. Interviewed about the film, Petrie described her extensive research on early photography to achieve historical accuracy; specific references included Edward Linley Sambourne's photographs and the Spitalfields Nippers photographs of the early 1900s. The director Sarah Gavron stated that the main character “Maud’s clothes had to be patched and threadbare”, so Petrie broke down and distressed costumes to make them appear aged and worn. The film's wardrobe was praised for its authenticity and representation of working-class women of the period.

For The Party (2017), Petrie collaborated with director Sally Potter, who researched Petrie's work extensively before bringing her onboard. This project was unusual as the film was shot in black and white.

In 2017, Petrie took over from Michele Clapton as costume designer on television series The Crown (Season Two). In this series, the Royal Family transitioned from 1950s propriety to more fashionable Sixties-era silhouettes, and reviewers noted "Princess Margaret, in particular, taking on a new wardrobe as part of a breakthrough to a more modern era". The principal costumes were made specially for the show, by a team of three cutters and their sewers, in workrooms at Elstree Studios. In some cases, they recreated historic garments worn by Elizabeth II, including a Norman Hartnell gown worn by the Queen to receive the Kennedys. Petrie's designs were praised for "recreating the essence of 1950s haute couture", and were nominated for Best Costume Design at the 2018 BAFTA TV Craft awards.

In 2018, Petrie costumed the Scottish period drama The Outlaw King, which required 14th century court dress and bloodied armour for battle scenes. Petrie returned to Medieval period costumes for The King (2019), directed by David Michôd.

For the mini-series adaptation The Essex Serpent (2023), which received a BAFTA for Best Costume Design, Petrie incorporated influences from traditional Dutch costume, fishing communities, and American Western wear. Petrie has explained that many of the small hats worn by the character Cora came from her own collection, which she has been building thorughout her career, after noticing that the costume houses were not able to supply them. The production of the series was interrupted by Covid, which led ot key meetings and fittings being done over video-call rather than in person, but did have the benefit of giving Petrie's costume-making team more time for hand-sewn details.

== Awards and recognition ==
Award	Year	Category	Title	Result	Ref
Costume Designers Guild Awards	2018	Excellence in Period Television	The Crown	Win	
Primetime Emmy	2018	Outstanding Period Costumes	The Crown	Win	
BAFTA TV Craft	2018	Best Costume Design	The Crown	Nominated	
BAFTA TV Craft	2023	Best Costume Design	The Essex Serpent	Win	
