= The Essex Serpent =

2016 novel by Sarah Perry

- Cover art of the first edition
- Author: Sarah Perry
- Cover artist: Peter Dyer
- Language: English
- Genre: Gothic, Historical fiction
- Publisher: Serpent's Tail
- Publication date: 27 May 2016
- Publication place: United Kingdom
- Pages: 432
- ISBN: 9781781255445

The Essex Serpent is a 2016 historical novel by British author Sarah Perry. The book is the second novel by Perry and was released on 27 May 2016 in the United Kingdom through Serpent's Tail, an imprint of Profile Books.

Set in the Victorian era, in the year 1893, it tells the tale of Cora Seaborne, a woman relishing her recent freedom from an abusive husband — she moves from London to a small village in Essex and becomes intrigued by the idea that it might be haunted by a mythological sea serpent.

== Plot summary ==
After being widowed when her wealthy, abusive husband dies of throat cancer, Cora Seaborne decides to ignore the trappings of her London society life and take up amateur palaeontology. While on holiday in Colchester with her son, Francis, and her companion, Martha, Cora is intrigued by a ruin caused by an earthquake which was rumoured to have awakened the Essex Serpent, a mythical sea dragon. Cora believes that the beast could be an undiscovered kind of dinosaur that survived extinction. Meeting two married London acquaintances, Charles and Katherine Ambrose, Cora tells them of her theories. The Ambroses tell her of friends of theirs, the Reverend William Ransome and his family, who live in the small village of Aldwinter where a serpent is carved in one of the pews of the church. The Ambroses write an introduction for Cora to the Ransome family and Cora goes to visit them. To their mutual surprise, she and the Reverend find they had already met under unfavourable circumstances: each had mistaken the other for a tramp. Cora becomes fast friends with the Reverend, his wife Stella and their children, and moves to Aldwinter to continue her research into the serpent.

The children and locals become increasingly convinced that the serpent, which they call the Blackwater Beast, is real and waiting to attack them. This irritates Will Ransome. He and Cora repeatedly argue over his faith and refusal to believe in the serpent, and their dispute draws them closer to one another. After a visit to the local school results in the schoolchildren falling into fits, Cora seeks an explanation by inviting her friend, Dr Luke Garnett, from London to examine them. Luke hypnotizes the Ransomes' eldest daughter, Joanna, with Stella's consent. Will walks in on the scene and is enraged, causing a serious rift between himself and Cora. During the rift, both Cora and Will begin to realize they are entangled in an emotional affair, as do Martha and Dr Luke, who has long been in love with Cora himself.

Will confesses his feelings to Cora in a letter shortly before he discovers that Stella, sick with tuberculosis, is near death. Luke also confesses his feelings to Cora via letter. Cora, left wary of men by her abusive former husband, is angered by them both. She ignores Will and writes an angry reply to Luke, only discovering later that her letter reached him the same day that a knife attack maimed him permanently and ended his medical career.

In Aldwinter a mysterious stench covers the town and the villagers believe it is related to the Blackwater Beast. All they discover at the shore is a gigantic dying fish and they rejoice that the serpent was never real.

Ashamed of her behaviour towards Luke, Cora allows Katherine to persuade her to return to Aldwinter to avoid abandoning her friends, the Ransomes. Returning, she and Will are once again strongly attracted to one another and consummate their relationship.

Joanna and her friend meanwhile discover that the Blackwater Beast turns out to be only an old boat previously thought to have been washed away. However, Cora comes to realise that Stella, delirious from her illness, has gone to the "beast" to die. Cora and Will are able to rescue Stella.

The Ransome children are sent to the Ambroses while Stella awaits her death. Will finds himself equally happy with Stella while still in love with Cora. Luke finds a kind of peace living with his friend Spencer, who has also been jilted in love, and Cora moves to London. Living alone, since her companion Martha has fallen in love and her son is in boarding school, Cora is happy in her solitude but continues to write to Will, urging him to reunite with her one day.

== Reception ==
Described by The Guardian as a "word-of-mouth bookselling success", the publication noted in May 2017 that The Essex Serpent had sold over 200,000 hardback copies. Publisher Serpent's Tail had originally set a modest sales target of 5,000 hardback copies for the title. In February 2021, publishing industry title The Bookseller reported that The Essex Serpent had sold 359,747 copies across all editions, according to Nielsen BookScan data.

The Essex Serpent won the British Book Awards for 2016 Book of the Year and Waterstones Book of the Year 2016.

== Adaptation ==
In 2020, a planned television adaptation was announced, to be directed by Clio Barnard with Keira Knightley starring. Knightley later dropped out of the project citing difficulties obtaining childcare due to the ongoing COVID-19 pandemic. On February 10, 2021, it was announced that Claire Danes would replace Knightley in the role of Cora Seaborne. On February 17, 2021, it was announced that Tom Hiddleston would take the lead male role of Will Ransome.

Anna Symon was the lead writer on the adaptation. Barnard and Symon produced with Jamie Laurenson, Hakan Kousetta, Patrick Walters, Iain Canning, Emile Sherman and Andrea Cornwell via See-Saw Films for Apple.
