= Joan Ellacott =

English costume designer

- Born: February 15, 1920; London, England
- Died: January 4, 2007 (aged 86); Aylesbury, Buckinghamshire, England
- Other name: Joan Mulcaster

Joan Muriel Ellacott (15 February 1920 – 4 January 2007) was an English costume designer whose work was featured in British and American films and television series. In a career spanning six decades, Ellacott garnered over 100 major credits. She has been recognised for "the sheer number of really top-notch historical dramas she costumed over the years".

== Life ==
Ellacott was born in London on 15 February 1920, and grew up in the USA.

Ellacott's first professional role came in 1946, when she assisted Elizabeth Haffenden on the Gainsborough Pictures film Jassy. This was an expensive production shot in Technicolor, and gave Ellacott opportunity to work on an innovative, big-budget production. Her fellow assistants at Gainsborough under Haffenden included future costume designers Julie Harris and Phyllis Dalton.

In the 1950s and 1960s, Ellacott specialised in British comedy films. In Mad About Men (1954), Ellacott dressed star Glynis Johns as two characters, a glamorous mermaid and her prim doppelgänger. She went on to design costume for many of the Carry On films of that era, including Carry on Sergeant (1958), Carry on Nurse (1959), Carry on Cruising (1962) and Carry on Cabby (1964), all directed by Gerald Thomas.

Later in the decade, Ellacott left film to design costumes for television's The Forsyte Saga (1967), the "most ambitious serialisation the BBC has undertaken" to that date. The series of 25 episodes required 700 costumes for men, and nearly 1500 for women. Ellacott's work was acclaimed for attention to period detail and high production values. The series was so popular that the on-screen Victorian dress styles influenced contemporary fashion in Britain. She also designed costumes for The First Churchills, a series about the first Duke of Marlborough. For the costumes for Pride and Prejudice (1979, directed by Cyril Coke), Ellacott studied surviving costumes in museums to achieve authentic period cuts and fabrics.

In 1976, Ellacott collaborated with BBC costume designer James Acheson on the Doctor Who episode The Deadly Assassin. Ellacott's final credit was as costume designer for Duel of Hearts (1991), an adaptation of Barbara Cartland's romantic novel.

Ellacott's costume design for Brigette Bardot in Doctor at Sea (1955) was shown in the exhibition Stage and Screen: Designs from the James L Gordon Collection at the Hunterian Gallery, Glasgow.

Ellacott was married to actor Michael Mulcaster.

== Death ==
She died in Aylesbury on 4 January 2007.

== Awards and nominations ==
Joan Ellacott was nominated for the following awards:

- 1977: Primetime Emmy Awards, Outstanding Achievement in Costume Design for a Drama or Comedy Series for Madame Bovary.
- 1978: British Academy Television Awards, Best Costume Design for Anna Karenina.
- 1981: British Academy Television Awards, Best Costume Design for Pride and Prejudice.
