= Psycho (franchise) =

American horror franchise

- Official franchise logo
- Created by: Robert Bloch
- Original work: Psycho (1959)
- Owner: Universal Pictures
- Years: 1959–present

Print publications
- Novels: Psycho (1959); Psycho II (1982); Psycho House (1990); Robert Bloch's Psycho: Sanitarium (2016)

Films and television
- Films: Psycho (1960); Psycho II (1983); Psycho III (1986); Psycho (1998)
- Television series: Bates Motel (2013–2017)
- Television films: Bates Motel (1987); Psycho IV: The Beginning (1990)

Audio
- Soundtracks: Psycho: Original Motion Picture Soundtrack (1960); Psycho II: Music from the Original Motion Picture Soundtrack (1983); Psycho III: Music from the Motion Picture (1986); Psycho: Music from and Inspired by the Motion Picture (1998)

Psycho is an American horror media franchise consisting of six films loosely based on the Psycho novels by Robert Bloch: Psycho, Psycho II, Psycho III, Bates Motel, Psycho IV: The Beginning, the 1998 remake of the original film, and additional merchandise spanning various media. The first film, Psycho, was directed by filmmaker Alfred Hitchcock. Subsequently, another film related to the series was made: an Alfred Hitchcock biopic, and two new novels, by Takekuni Kitayama and Chet Williamson, were released. Also, an independent documentary film called The Psycho Legacy was released on October 19, 2010, mostly focusing on Psycho II, Psycho III and Psycho IV: The Beginning, while covering the impact and legacy of the original film.

The franchise focuses on Norman Bates, a deeply disturbed individual who operates the Bates Motel. He is mentally unstable due to his domineering relationship with his mother, which results in him having a psychotic twisted split personality, and, as a result, he occasionally kills people.

A five-season television series, Bates Motel, aired on A&E between 2013 and 2017. In a modern-day setting, it is a re-imagining of the Norman and Norma Bates characters, and their unusual relationship. It stars Freddie Highmore as a teenaged Norman and Vera Farmiga as his mother Norma.

== Novels ==
=== Psycho (1959) ===
In 1959, the novel Psycho was published. It was marketed as being loosely based on the Wisconsin serial killer and cannibal Ed Gein, after author Robert Bloch, who lived 40 miles away from Gein's farmhouse, learned of the killings shortly before finishing the novel, having independently liked the idea of somebody being able to kill people in a small community and get away with it for years without being caught. Bloch was further surprised years later when news of Gein's living in isolation with a religiously fanatical mother came to his attention, in "how closely the imaginary character I'd created resembled the real Ed Gein both in overt act and apparent motivation". The character of Norman Bates was different in the novel from in the film version. In the novel, Bates is overweight, in his early 40s and drinks heavily. When Joseph Stefano adapted the novel into the screenplay, he made the character of Norman young, attractive and vulnerable.

=== Psycho II (1982) ===
In 1982, Bloch wrote a sequel novel called Psycho II which satirized the slasher genre and mocked the production of the 1983 film version, which was created independently and without Bloch's input. In the novel, Norman Bates escapes the mental institution and goes to Hollywood to stop the production of a film based on his life. Criticisms of the novel stated that Bloch's writing was immature, incoherent and unsuitable for adaptation into a motion picture.

=== Psycho House (1990) ===
In 1990, due to the pressure from his publishing company, Bloch wrote a third novel called Psycho House, but according to horror writer David J. Schow, when writing it Bloch originally called it Psycho 13. In the novel, set ten years after Norman Bates' death, the Bates mansion and motel are both bought as tourist attractions, before a series of mysterious murders begin to take place.

=== Psycho: Sanitarium (2016) ===
A fourth installment, titled Robert Bloch's Psycho: Sanitarium and written by Chet Williamson, was released in 2016. The book is set between the events of the original novel and Psycho II, recounting the events which took place in a state hospital for the criminally insane where Bates is a patient.

== Films ==
Film	U.S. release date	Director(s)	Screenwriter(s)	Producer(s)
Psycho	September 8, 1960	Alfred Hitchcock	Joseph Stefano	Alfred Hitchcock
Psycho II	June 3, 1983	Richard Franklin	Tom Holland	Hilton A. Green & Bernard Schwartz
Psycho III	July 2, 1986	Anthony Perkins	Charles Edward Pogue	Hilton A. Green
Bates Motel	July 5, 1987	Richard Rothstein	Richard Rothstein	George Linder, Ken Topolsky & Henry Kline
Psycho IV: The Beginning	November 10, 1990	Mick Garris	Joseph Stefano	George Zaloom & Les Mayfield
Psycho	December 4, 1998	Gus Van Sant	Joseph Stefano	Gus Van Sant & Brian Grazer

=== Psycho (1960) ===
In need of money to get her boyfriend, Sam Loomis, out of debt (John Gavin), Marion Crane (Janet Leigh) steals $40,000 (approximately $441,601 in 2026 dollars) from her employer and flees Phoenix, Arizona by car. While en route to Sam's California home, she parks along the road to sleep. A highway patrol officer awakens her and, suspicious of her agitation, follows her. When she trades her car for another at a dealership, he notes the new vehicle's details. Marion returns to the road but, rather than drive in a heavy storm, decides to spend the night at the Bates Motel. The proprietor, Norman Bates (Anthony Perkins), tells Marion he rarely has customers because of the motel's disconnection from a new Interstate and mentions he lives with his mother in the house overlooking the motel. He invites Marion to supper. She overhears Norman arguing with his mother about letting Marion in the house, and during the meal, she angers him by suggesting he institutionalize his mother. He admits he would like this, but does not want to abandon her.

Marion resolves to return to Phoenix to return the money. After calculating how she can repay the money she has spent, Marion dumps her notes down the toilet and begins to shower. An anonymous female figure enters the bathroom and stabs her to death. Finding the corpse, Norman is horrified. He places Marion's body, wrapped in the shower curtain, and all her possessions - including the money - in the trunk of her car and sinks it in a nearby swamp.

Shortly afterward, Sam is contacted by both Marion's sister Lila Crane (Vera Miles) and private detective Milton Arbogast (Martin Balsam), who has been hired by Marion's employer to recover the money. Arbogast traces Marion to the motel and questions Norman, who unconvincingly lies that Marion stayed for one night and left the following morning. He refuses to let Arbogast talk to his mother, claiming she is ill. Arbogast calls Lila to update her and tells her he will call again after he questions Norman's mother.

Arbogast enters Norman's house and at the top of the stairs is attacked by a figure who slashes his face with a knife, pushes him down the stairs, then stabs him to death. When Arbogast does not call Lila, she and Sam contact the local police. Deputy Sheriff Al Chambers (John McIntire) is perplexed to learn Arbogast saw a woman in a window since Norman's mother died ten years ago. Norman confronts his mother and urges her to hide in the cellar. She rejects the idea and orders him out of her room, but against her will, Norman carries her to the cellar.

Posing as a married couple, Sam and Lila check into the motel and search Marion's room, where they find a scrap of paper in the toilet with "$40,000" written on it. While Sam distracts Norman, Lila sneaks into the house. Sam suggests to Norman that he killed Marion for the money so he could buy a new hotel. Realizing Lila is not around, Norman knocks Sam unconscious and rushes to the house. Lila sees him and hides in the cellar where she discovers the semi-preserved and mummified body of Norman's mother. Wearing his mother's clothes and a wig and carrying a knife, Norman enters and tries to attack Lila, but she is rescued by Sam.

After Norman's arrest, forensic psychiatrist Dr. Richmond (Simon Oakland) tells Sam and Lila that Norman's dead mother is living in Norman's psyche as an alternate personality. After the death of Norman's father, the pair lived as if they were the only people in the world. When his mother found a lover, Norman went mad with jealousy and murdered them both. Consumed with guilt, Norman "erased the crime" by bringing his mother back to life in his mind. He stole her corpse and preserved the body. When he was "Mother", he acted, talked, and dressed as she would. The psychiatrist concludes that the "Mother" personality now has complete control of Norman's mind.

In the final scene, Norman sits in a cell, thinking in "Mother's" voice. In a voiceover, "Mother" explains that she plans to prove that she is incapable of violence by refusing to swat a fly that has landed on her hand. The final shot shows Marion's car being recovered from the swamp.

=== Psycho II (1983) ===
Norman Bates (Anthony Perkins) is released from a mental institution after 22 years. Lila Crane (Vera Miles), the sister of Bates' victim Marion Crane and widow of the now-deceased Sam Loomis, vehemently protests with a petition that she has been circulating with signatures of 743 people, including the relatives of the six people Norman killed prior to his incarceration, but her plea is dismissed. Norman is taken to his old home, the Bates Motel, with the house behind it on the hill, by Dr. Bill Raymond (Robert Loggia), who assures him everything will be fine. He is introduced to the motel's new manager, Warren Toomey (Dennis Franz). The following day, Norman reports to a pre-arranged job at a nearby diner, run by a kindly old lady named Emma Spool (Claudia Bryar). One of his co-workers there is Mary Samuels (Meg Tilly), a young waitress. Mary claims she has been thrown out of her boyfriend's place and needs a place to stay. Norman offers to let her stay at the motel, then extends the offer to his home when he discovers that Toomey has turned his beloved establishment into a sleazy adult motel.

Norman's adjustment back into society appears to be going along well until "Mother" begins to make her presence known. Norman gets mysterious notes from "Mother" at the house and diner. Phone calls come from someone claiming to be Norman's mother. Toomey picks a fight at the diner after Norman fires him. Later, a figure in a black dress stabs Toomey to death with a kitchen knife as he is packing to leave the motel. Norman begins to doubt his sanity when he begins hearing voices in the house. He enters his mother's bedroom to find it looks exactly as it did 22 years ago. A sound lures him to the attic, where he is locked in. Believing the house to be abandoned, a teenage couple sneaks in through the cellar window. They notice a female figure pacing in the next room. As they try to climb out, the boy is stabbed to death. The girl escapes and alerts the police. Mary eventually finds Norman in the attic. Sheriff Hunt (Hugh Gillin) questions them about the boy's murder. He finds the cellar neat and orderly. Norman is about to admit that something suspicious is going on, but Mary claims that she has cleaned up the basement herself. After the sheriff leaves, Norman asks Mary why she lied. She explains that she had to save him from being arrested. Norman collapses into the chair with his head in his hands and moans, "It's starting again!"

Mary is startled later when she discovers someone looking at her through a peephole in the bathroom wall. She calls out to Norman, who is downstairs and out of reach. The two are horrified to find a bloody cloth that has been stuffed down the toilet. Norman appears confused and believes he may have committed another murder. Mary goes down to check the motel. In the parlor she is surprised by Lila, who reveals herself to be Mary's mother. She has been calling Norman claiming to be his mother, even going so far as to dress up as her and allowing him to see her in the window. Mary has been helping her. She was responsible for restoring Mother's room at the house and locking Norman in the attic. All of this was an attempt to drive Norman insane again and have him recommitted.

Mary's growing feelings for Norman, however, have been preying on her conscience leaving her to reconsider her actions. Meanwhile, Dr. Raymond discovers Mary's identity as Lila's daughter and informs Norman. He also orders the corpse of Norma Bates (which was buried in a proper grave after the events of the original film) to be exhumed, to prove that Norman isn't being haunted by his mother. Mary admits to Norman that she has been part of Lila's ruse, and that while she now refuses to continue, Lila won't stop. Mary goes to Lila's hotel and their argument is overheard by a bartender. Later, Lila drives over to Norman's house, unaware that Dr. Raymond is watching her from the Bates Motel as she sneaks into the cellar. While removing her "Mother" costume from a loose stone in the floor, another figure dressed as "Mother" steps out of the shadows and murders her. Dr. Raymond runs up to the house. Lila's body is not in the cellar.

Meanwhile, Mary discovers that a car has been retrieved from the swamp, with Toomey's body in the trunk. Realizing the police will shortly arrive to arrest Norman, Mary returns to warn him. The phone rings in the house, Norman answers, and starts speaking to his "mother". Mary listens in and discovers that nobody is on the line with Norman. Terrified, Mary runs downstairs into the cellar, and quickly dresses up as Mother to confront Norman. Someone grabs her from behind, and she plunges the butcher knife into… Dr. Raymond, who has sneaked back into the house. A stunned Mary runs downstairs and is confronted by a deranged Norman, who promises to cover up for "Mother". Mary tries to keep him away, repeatedly stabbing him in the hands and chest. He backs Mary into the fruit cellar to hide and slips on a pile of coal, which avalanches away from the wall, revealing Lila's body hidden behind it. Mary is now convinced that Norman had been committing the murders. She raises her knife to stab him and is shot to death by the incoming police. The sheriff inaccurately believes Lila and Mary committed all the murders.

That evening, a woman walks up the steps to the Bates' mansion. Bandaged from his injuries, Norman has set a place for dinner when he hears a knock at the door. It is Miss (not Mrs.) Emma Spool, the kindly woman from the diner. Norman gives her a cup of tea. Miss Spool tells him that she is his real mother, that Mrs. Bates was her sister (Spool being her maiden name), who adopted Norman as an infant while Miss Spool was institutionalized. She further reveals that she was the murderer, having killed anybody who tried to harm her son. As she sips the tea, Norman kills her with a sudden blow to the head with a shovel. Norman is now completely insane again. He carries Miss Spool's body upstairs to Mother's room and we hear Mother's voice warn Norman not to play with "filthy girls". Norman reopens the Bates Motel and stands in front of the house, waiting for new customers as Mother watches from the window upstairs.

=== Psycho III (1986) ===
Maureen Coyle (Diana Scarwid), a mentally unstable young nun, is on top of a bell tower about to commit suicide. When another nun tries to get her to come down, Maureen accidentally pushes her over the railing to her death. Another nun tells Maureen that she will burn in hell. She is forced to leave the convent after this ordeal.

Norman Bates (Anthony Perkins) is still manning the desk at the Bates Motel and living with the preserved corpse of his real mother, Emma Spool (Claudia Bryar), whom Norman killed at the end of Psycho II. Local law enforcement and Norman's ex-boss Ralph Statler (Robert Alan Browne) are concerned since Mrs. Spool has been missing for over a month. Duane Duke (Jeff Fahey), a sleazy musician desperate for money, is offered the job of assistant manager at the Bates Motel. Maureen, now the new long-term tenant, has some issues to resolve in her life. She gave up her vows as a nun only days before, and she isn't sure just how she feels about either spiritual or earthly matters.

Sheriff John Hunt (Hugh Gillin) and Statler have a conversation at the diner, when Tracy Venable (Roberta Maxwell), a pushy journalist from Los Angeles, interrupts them. She is working on an article about serial killers being put back on the streets. Venable is trying to back up her theory that Norman is back to his old ways again. Norman appears and Venable jumps at the chance to talk with him. Unaware of her ulterior motives Norman opens up to her, but is distracted when an exhausted Maureen enters and sits at the lunch counter. He is startled by Maureen's presence, because he feels she strongly resembles Marion Crane. Seeing the initials "M.C." on her suitcase, Norman freaks out and leaves the diner. After a conversation with "Mother", Norman spies on Maureen as she undresses and heads into the bathroom to take a shower. Keeping "her" word, "Mother" enters Maureen's motel room with plans to kill her. Upon pulling back the shower curtain, it is revealed Maureen has attempted suicide by cutting her wrists, a sight which snaps Norman back to his "normal" side. Maureen looks up at "Mother" who is so weakened by what "she" sees, "she" lowers the knife. Due to blood loss, Maureen hallucinates and she mistakes Norman, dressed up as "Mother", for the Virgin Mary holding a silver crucifix.

Meanwhile, Tracy has met with Duane at a bar where they discuss Norman, and it seems Tracy blames Norman for Mrs. Spool's disappearance. When she leaves, Duane picks up another girl at the bar, Red (Juliette Cummins). Norman gets Maureen to the local hospital to save her life. After she is released, he invites her to stay back at the motel and they begin a romantic relationship. The same night, Duane and Red arrive at the motel and hear an argument between "Mother" and Norman, but think it's just a TV turned up too loud. Red and Duane, head to cabin 12 where they make love. Later that night, Red, makes it clear she wants more than just a fling. Calling him a pig, they argue. Duane, infuriated, throws her out of the cabin. Red heads down to the payphone to call a cab, where she realizes she is wearing her blouse backwards. As she takes it off to put it on the right way, "Mother" shatters the phone booth door and stabs a trapped Red to death. The next morning, Duane finds Norman scrubbing down the phone booth.

A group from out of town arrive at the motel where they plan to watch the local football game. Tracy comes to find Norman and ask questions about his past and "Mother". Norman becomes defensive with the reporter and tells her to leave, never to return. Later that night, he and Maureen go to a restaurant, where they dance and talk romantically, while Tracy searches Mrs. Spool's apartment. She discovers the Bates Motel's telephone number written on a magazine cover. Norman and Maureen return to the motel to find most of the other guests engaged in drunken stupor. Norman goes with Maureen to her room and they fall asleep in each other's arms having refused to make love. Some time afterwards, Patsy Boyle (Katt Shea Ruben), the only sober guest, wakes up Maureen to ensure her safety as Norman had left the door open, a bad idea with all the drunken guests around. Patsy, needing to use the bathroom, finds the one in Norman's parlor unoccupied, but "Mother" again emerges and slashes her throat. Norman gasps when he discovers Patsy's body. He buries her in the motel's ice chest outside the office.

The next morning, Sheriff Hunt and Deputy Leo appear at Norman's house to investigate Patsy's disappearance. Norman tries to prevent Hunt from entering his mother's bedroom, when he discovers that "Mother"/Mrs. Spool has disappeared completely. Outside, Tracy tells Maureen about Norman, and she, rather upset, leaves the motel and goes to stay with Father Brian (Gary Bayer), who took care of her at the hospital. Meanwhile, Tracy is convinced Norman is behind the latest disappearances. Norman searches for his mother all over the house and finds a note from her stating that she is in cabin 12. When Norman arrives at the cabin, he learns it was Duane who took "Mother". Duane confronts him then attempts to blackmail Norman into paying him off, or he will turn Norman in to the police. He tells Duane he doesn't have that kind of money, but Duane reminds him that Norman has made a lot of cash from his business, and if Norman doesn't give money for his silence, he will go to the police. He agrees to Duane's blackmail demands, but he then unexpectedly throws an ashtray at Duane's head. They fight and Norman seemingly kills Duane by hitting him several times with his own guitar. Terrified of what he has done, he blames "Mother" for this.

Tracy talks to Statler and Myrna (Lee Garlington) about Mrs. Spool and discovers she was working at the diner before Statler bought it from Harvey Leach. Tracy meets with Leach, a resident at an assisted living facility, and is informed that Mrs. Spool had also once been institutionalized for murder. Meanwhile, Norman drives Duane's car to the swamp with Duane and Patsy's bodies in it. Duane turns out to be alive and attacks Norman, who accidentally drives the car into the swamp. He struggles out of the car while Duane drowns. Tracy reads some old newspapers at her study and discovers about the "Bates kidnapping".

Maureen convinces herself that Norman is her true love. She returns to the motel and takes a shower before visiting Norman at his house. They share a tender moment at the top of the staircase when "Mother" shouts furiously at Norman, which startles him and causes him to lose grip on Maureen's hands. She falls down the stairs into the Cupid statue at the base of the stairs. She goes limp and sinks to the floor revealing the arrow had punctured her skull. Distraught, Norman screams and confronts his mother, saying that he will get her for this.

At that moment, Tracy arrives at the motel and tries to find Maureen. She enters the house only to find her lying dead on the couch of the living room which is filled with lit candles. Then she sees Norman dressed as "Mother", holding a knife, and tries to flee. She tries to reason with Norman by explaining his family history: Emma Spool, who was in fact his aunt, was in love with Norman's father, but he married her sister, Norma, instead. Mrs. Spool, having serious psychological problems, kidnapped Norman when he was a baby after she killed Mr. Bates, believing Norman was the child "she should have had with him". She discovers Mrs. Spool's corpse in the bedroom, and Norman takes off his mother's dress. "Mother" orders him to kill Tracy, and when Norman raises the knife, he instead brutally attacks "Mother", dismembering her preserved remains. The last scene shows Sheriff Hunt taking Norman to his squad car, with Father Brian and Tracy following behind. Hunt informs Norman that they may never let him out of the institution again, while Norman replies, "But I'll be free… I'll finally be free". Norman, sitting silently in the back of the squad car on the way to the institution, enjoys his victory over his mother by caressing a trophy: the severed hand of Mrs. Spool. He smiles sardonically as the screen fades to black and the credits roll.

=== Bates Motel (1987) ===
Bates Motel ignores the existence of Psycho II and III (and would in turn be ignored by Psycho IV), with Norman Bates never being released from the mental institution to allow the events of those films. Alex West (Bud Cort) is a mentally disturbed youth who was admitted to the asylum for killing his abusive stepfather. At the asylum, he roomed with Norman Bates (Kurt Paul) and they eventually became close friends. Years later, Norman dies and Alex learns that he has inherited the Bates Motel. He travels to Norman's California hometown (renamed Fairville for this film; in the original film it was Fairvale) and with a little help from teenage runaway Willie (Lori Petty) and local handyman Henry Watson (Moses Gunn), Alex struggles to re-open the motel for business. Alex gets a loan to renovate the motel, but the project is plagued with rumors about the place being haunted by the ghost of Norman's mother, Mrs. Bates, and the discovery of her remains, as well as those of her late husband, buried on the grounds of the motel. When recovering the remains of Mrs. Bates, the sheriff said that the body "was never found", which seems to conflict with the original Psycho, with Mrs. Bates in the basement where Norman is finally captured by Sam Loomis.

While renovating the motel, Alex sees Mrs. Bates in her bedroom window, and sees the corpse of her late husband from the same window, supporting the idea that the property is haunted. Willie becomes suspicious and eventually they find that the haunting was a prank by the bank manager, Tom Fuller (Gregg Henry), who had approved a loan with predatory terms with Alex and was trying to sabotage the motel by trying to scare him away. Tom is then forced to help Alex and the others by negotiating friendlier payment terms for the loan or face prison for fraud.

Meanwhile, not all ghost stories turn out to be hoaxes as Barbara Peters (Kerrie Keane) books a room in Alex's motel for the night, contemplating suicide for getting older, going through three divorces without children. Barbara meets a teenage girl (Khrystyne Haje), who invites Barbara to dance at an after prom party in the motel with her and her teenage friends, including Tony Scotti (Jason Bateman), though Barbara felt uncomfortable hanging with young kids. It is then revealed that Barbara's real name is Sally, and that the teenage girl took her own life 25 years ago and is now trapped in "the other side", along with Tony, and other teens who also committed suicide. She tells Barbara that she has a life worth living for, before leaving with the rest of the group. Barbara leaves the motel the next day, planning to live her life to the fullest.

Alex looks at the screen telling viewers, "If you ever need a room, come by. I can't say for sure what you'll find, but it is what makes the world go around".

=== Psycho IV: The Beginning (1990) ===
Fran Ambrose (CCH Pounder) is a radio talk show host who is talking on the topic of "matricide" (when children kill their mothers) with guest Dr. Richmond (Warren Frost), who was Norman Bates' former psychologist. The radio receives a call from Norman Bates (Anthony Perkins), who has re-entered society and married his former psychiatrist, Connie (Donna Mitchell). Under the alias of "Ed" (possibly a reference to Ed Gein, the killer after whom the character of Norman was modeled), Norman tells his story, which the audience sees as a series of flashbacks set in the 1940s and 1950s. Some flashbacks are slightly out of order. The chronological story is: in 1950, Norman's mother, Norma Bates (Olivia Hussey) had schizophrenia; she was smothering Norman and would have violent mood swings. Due to Norman's sexual repression at her hands, when she was frolicking with him he had an incestuous erection, causing her to dress him in women's clothing and taunt him by calling him "Norma". She then got engaged to a man named Chet Rudolph (Thomas Schuster), who would beat up Norman. Eventually Norman got fed up with her allowing Chet to be in their lives and poisoned them both, albeit reluctantly. He then developed his infamous dissociative identity disorder and stole her corpse to create the illusion that she was alive—whenever her corpse spoke to him, the "Norma" personality would take over. This caused Norman as "Norma" to kill two women who wanted to have sex with him.

Throughout the spaces in the flashbacks, Dr. Richmond realizes "Ed" is Norman and tries to convince Fran to trace the calls. Richmond's worries are dismissed because they cannot trace the call and they believe they can talk Norman out of the reason he called: he fears he will kill again. He tells Fran that Connie got pregnant against his wishes and that he does not want another "monster". He then tells Fran he does believe his mother is dead, but he will kill Connie "with my own hands, just like the first time". He then takes Connie to his mother's house and attempts to kill her, but after Connie reassures Norman that their child will not be a monster, he drops his knife in shame and Connie forgives him. He then burns the house where all his unhappiness began. As he tries to escape the flames, he hallucinates that he sees his victims, Chet, his mother and eventually himself preserving her corpse. He and Connie leave the scene with Norman stating, "I'm free". As the credits roll, however, the sound of his newborn baby crying can be heard.

=== Psycho (1998) ===
In need of money to get her boyfriend Sam Loomis (Viggo Mortensen) out of debt, Marion Crane (Anne Heche) steals $400,000 from her employer and flees Phoenix, Arizona by car. While en route to Sam's California home, she parks along the road to sleep. A highway patrol officer awakens her and, suspicious of her agitated state, begins to follow her. When she trades her car for another one at a dealership, he notes the new vehicle's details. Marion returns to the road but, rather than drive in a heavy storm, decides to spend the night at the Bates Motel. The proprietor, Norman Bates (Vince Vaughn), tells Marion he rarely has customers because of a new interstate nearby and mentions he lives with his mother in the house overlooking the motel. He invites Marion to have supper with him. She overhears Norman arguing with his mother about letting Marion in the house, and during the meal she angers him by suggesting he institutionalize his mother. He admits he would like to do so, but does not want to abandon her.

Marion resolves to return to Phoenix to return the money. After calculating how she can repay the money she has spent, Marion dumps her notes down the toilet and begins to shower. An anonymous female figure enters the bathroom and stabs her to death. Finding the corpse, Norman is horrified. He cleans the bathroom and places Marion's body, wrapped in the shower curtain, and all her possessions - including the money - in the trunk of her car and sinks it in a nearby swamp.

Shortly afterward, Sam is contacted by both Marion's sister Lila Crane (Julianne Moore) and private detective Milton Arbogast (William H. Macy), who has been hired by Marion's employer to find her and recover the money. Arbogast traces Marion to the motel and questions Norman, who unconvincingly lies that Marion stayed for one night and left the following morning. He refuses to let Arbogast talk to his mother, claiming she is ill. Arbogast calls Lila to update her and tells her he will contact her again within an hour after he questions Norman's mother.

Arbogast enters Norman's house and at the top of the stairs is attacked by a figure who slashes his face three times with a knife, pushes him down the stairs, then stabs him to death. When Arbogast does not call Lila, she and Sam contact the local police. Deputy Sheriff Al Chambers (Philip Baker Hall) is perplexed to learn Arbogast saw a woman in a window, since Norman's mother died ten years ago. Norman confronts his mother and urges her to hide in the cellar. She rejects the idea and orders him out of her room, but against her will Norman carries her to the cellar.

Posing as a married couple, Sam and Lila check into the motel and search Marion's room, where they find a scrap of paper in the toilet with "$400,000" written on it. While Sam distracts Norman, Lila sneaks into the house to search for his mother. Sam suggests to Norman that he killed Marion for the money so he could buy a new motel. Realizing Lila is not around, Norman knocks Sam unconscious with a golf club and rushes to the house. Lila sees him and hides in the cellar where she discovers the semi-preserved and mummified body of Norman's mother. Wearing his mother's clothes and a wig and carrying a knife, Norman enters and tries to attack Lila, but she is rescued by Sam.

After Norman's arrest, forensic psychiatrist Dr. Fred Richmond (Robert Forster) tells Sam and Lila that Norman's dead mother is living in Norman's psyche as an alternate personality. After the death of Norman's father, the pair lived as if they were the only people in the world. When his mother found a lover, Norman went over the edge with jealousy and murdered both of them. Consumed with guilt, he tried to "erase the crime" by bringing his mother back to life in his mind. He stole her corpse and preserved the body. When he is "Mother", he acts, talks, and dresses as she would. Norman imagined his mother would be as jealous of a woman to whom he might be attracted just as he was of his mother's lover, and so "Mother" kills any woman he has feelings for; when Norman regains consciousness, he believes that his mother has committed the crime, and covers up for her. It is implied that Norman is responsible for the unsolved disappearances of two young girls. Richmond concludes that the "Mother" personality has now taken complete control of Norman's mind.

In the final scene, Norman sits in a cell, thinking in "Mother's" voice. In a voiceover, "Mother" explains that she plans to prove to the authorities she is incapable of violence by refusing to swat a fly that has landed on her hand. The final shot shows Marion's car being recovered from the swamp, and then goes to end credits.

== Television ==
Title	Seasons	Episodes	First released	Last released	Showrunner(s)	Network
Bates Motel	5	50	March 18, 2013	April 24, 2017	Carlton Cuse; Kerry Ehrin; Anthony Cipriano	A&E

=== Bates Motel (2013–2017) ===
A TV series by A&E network named Bates Motel is loosely based on the Psycho films and novels. The series is a television reboot set in the 2010s and chronicle Norman Bates' early childhood with his mother and how she drove him to become a killer. Bates Motel takes place in the modern day and stars Freddie Highmore as young Norman Bates and Vera Farmiga as Mrs. Bates. It premiered on March 18, 2013, and produced five seasons for a total of 50 episodes. The series was shot in Vancouver with a replica of the Psycho house from Universal Studios Hollywood and a recreation of the original Bates Motel from the first film. The original interior sets have also been recreated.

== Storyline continuity ==
Psycho story chronology
Original continuity
- Psycho IV: The Beginning (flashback storyline)
- Psycho (1960)
- Psycho II
- Psycho III
- Psycho IV: The Beginning (present storyline)
Alternate continuity
- Psycho (1960)
- Bates Motel
Remake continuity
- Psycho (1998)
Bates Motel continuity
- Bates Motel (2013–2017)

== Cast and crew ==
=== Principal cast ===
List indicators

This section includes characters who will appear or have appeared in more than two films in the series.

- An empty grey cell indicates the character was not in the film, or that the character's official presence has not yet been confirmed.
- ^{A} indicates an appearance through archival footage or audio.
- ^{C} indicates a cameo role.
- ^{G} indicates a guest appearance in the season.
- ^{O} indicates an older version of the character.
- ^{R} indicates a recurring role in the season.
- ^{U} indicates an uncredited appearance.
- ^{V} indicates a voice-only role.
- ^{Y} indicates a younger version of the character.

Characters	Films						Television series				
Characters	Original series				Television spin-off	Remake	Television series				
Characters	Psycho	Psycho II	Psycho III	Psycho IV: The Beginning	Bates Motel	Psycho	Bates Motel				
Characters	Psycho	Psycho II	Psycho III	Psycho IV: The Beginning	Bates Motel	Psycho	Season 1	Season 2	Season 3	Season 4	Season 5
Characters	1960	1983	1986	1990	1987	1998	2013	2014	2015	2016	2017
Norman Bates	Anthony Perkins	Anthony Perkins Osgood Perkins^{Y}	Anthony Perkins	Anthony Perkins Henry Thomas^{Y} Ryan Finnigan^{Y}	Kurt Paul	Vince Vaughn	Freddie Highmore^{M} Beckham Skodje^{Y} Luke Roessler^{Y}	Freddie Highmore^{M}	Freddie Highmore^{M}	Freddie Highmore^{M} Nicholas Holmes^{Y}	Freddie Highmore^{M}
Norma "Mother" Bates	Virginia Gregg^{U}^{V} Jeanette Nolan^{U}^{V} Paul Jasmin^{U}^{V}	Virginia Gregg^{U}^{V}	Virginia Gregg^{U}^{V}	Olivia Hussey Alice Hirson^{V}	Mentioned	Rose Marie^{U}^{V}	Vera Farmiga^{M}	Vera Farmiga^{M} Sarah Grey^{Y}	Vera Farmiga^{M} Madyson Parsons^{Y}	Vera Farmiga^{M}	Vera Farmiga^{M} Mira Eden^{Y}
Marion Crane	Janet Leigh	Janet Leigh^{A}	Janet Leigh^{A}	Mentioned		Anne Heche					Rihanna^{SG}
Lila Loomis (née Crane)	Vera Miles	Vera Miles	Mentioned			Julianne Moore					
Sam Loomis	John Gavin	Mentioned				Viggo Mortensen					Austin Nichols^{R}
Arbogast	Martin Balsam					William H. Macy					
Sheriff Al Chambers	John McIntire					Philip Baker Hall					
George Lowery	Vaughn Taylor					Rance Howard					Raphael Sbarge^{G}
Tom Cassidy	Frank Albertson					Chad Everett					
Mrs. Chambers (Note: Unnamed and referred to as "Mrs. Chambers" in the original 1960 film, but is fully named in the 1998 remake and referred to as Eliza Chambers.)	Lurene Tuttle					Anne Haney					
Caroline	Pat Hitchcock					Rita Wilson					Teryl Rothery^{G}
Charlie (Note: Referred to as "California Charlie" in the original 1960 film.)	John Anderson					James LeGros					
Dr. Richmond (Note: Referred to as "Fred Richmond" in the original 1960 film, "Leo Richmond" in Psycho IV: The Beginning, and as "Simon Richmond" in the 1998 remake.)	Simon Oakland			Warren Frost		Robert Forster					
Highway Patrol Officer (Note: Referred to as "Officer Kaplan" in Bates Motel.)	Mort Mills					James Remar					Carlton Cuse^{G}
Sheriff John Hunt		Hugh Gillin	Hugh Gillin								
Ralph Statler		Robert Alan Browne	Robert Alan Browne								
Myrna		Lee Garlington	Lee Garlington								
Mary Loomis		Meg Tilly									
Dr. Bill Raymond		Robert Loggia									
Warren Toomey		Dennis Franz									
Emma Spool		Claudia Bryar	Claudia Bryar^{A}								
Maureen Coyle			Diana Scarwid								
Duane Duke			Jeff Fahey								
Tracy Venable			Roberta Maxwell								
Father Brian			Gary Bayer								
Red			Juliette Cummins								
Patsy Boyle			Katt Shea								
Fran Ambrose				CCH Pounder							
Chet Rudolph				Thomas Schuster							
Connie Bates				Donna Mitchell							
Mike Calvecchio				John Landis							
Eleen Stevens				Cynthia Garris							
Holly				Sharen Camille							
Alex West					Bud Cort						
Willie					Lori Petty						
Henry Watson					Moses Gunn						
Tom Fuller					Gregg Henry						
Sally					Khrystyne Haje						
Tony Scotti					Jason Bateman						
Barbara Peters					Kerrie Keane						
Dr. Goodman					Robert Picardo						
Dylan Massett							Max Thieriot^{M}	Max Thieriot^{M}	Max Thieriot^{M}	Max Thieriot^{M}	Max Thieriot^{M}
Emma Decody							Olivia Cooke^{M}	Olivia Cooke^{M}	Olivia Cooke^{M}	Olivia Cooke^{M}	Olivia Cooke^{M}
Bradley Martin							Nicola Peltz^{M}	Nicola Peltz^{M}	Nicola Peltz^{G}		
Sheriff Alex Romero							Néstor Carbonell^{R}	Néstor Carbonell^{M}	Néstor Carbonell^{M}	Néstor Carbonell^{M}	Néstor Carbonell^{M}
Caleb Calhoun								Kenny Johnson^{R} Stephen Boersma^{Y}	Kenny Johnson^{M}	Kenny Johnson^{G}	Kenny Johnson^{R}

=== Crew ===
Title	Crew/detail					
Title	Composer(s)	Cinematographer	Editor(s)	Production companies	Distribution companies	Running time
Psycho (1960)	Bernard Herrmann	John L. Russell	George Tomasini	Shamley Productions	Paramount Pictures	109 minutes
Psycho II (1983)	Jerry Goldsmith	Dean Cundey	Andrew London	Oak Industries	Universal Pictures	113 minutes
Psycho III (1986)	Carter Burwell	Bruce Surtees	David Blewitt	Universal Pictures		93 minutes
Bates Motel (1987)	J. Peter Robinson	Bill Butler	Dann Cahn Richard A. Freeman	Universal Television	NBC	95 minutes
Psycho IV: The Beginning (1990)	Graeme Revell	Rodney Charters	Charles Bornstein	MCA Television Entertainment Smart Money Productions	Showtime	105 minutes
Psycho (1998)	Bernard Herrmann Danny Elfman & Steve Bartek (adapting)	Christopher Doyle	Amy E. Duddleston	Imagine Entertainment	Universal Pictures	104 minutes

== Production ==
=== History (1959–1997) ===
Psycho is based on the 1959 novel of the same name by Robert Bloch which in turn is based loosely on the case of convicted Wisconsin murderer Ed Gein. Both Gein and Psycho's protagonist, Norman Bates, were solitary murderers in isolated rural locations. Both had deceased, domineering mothers, and had sealed off one room of their house as a shrine to their mother, and both dressed in women's clothing. There are many differences between Bates and Ed Gein, however. Among others, Gein would not be strictly considered a serial killer, having officially killed "only" two people. Peggy Robertson, Hitchcock's production assistant, read Anthony Boucher's positive review of the Bloch novel and decided to show the book to Hitchcock, even though readers at Hitchcock's home studio Paramount Pictures rejected its premise for a film. Hitchcock acquired rights to the novel for $9,500. He reportedly ordered Robertson to buy up copies to keep the novel's surprises for the film. Hitchcock chose to film Psycho to recover from two aborted projects with Paramount: Flamingo Feather and No Bail for the Judge. Hitchcock also faced genre competitors whose works were critically compared to his own and so wanted to film new material. The director also disliked stars' salary demands and trusted only a few people to choose prospective material, including Robertson.

Paramount executives did not want to produce the film and refused to provide the budget that Hitchcock received from them for previous films with the studio. Hitchcock decided to plan for Psycho to be filmed quickly and inexpensively, similar to an episode of his ongoing television series Alfred Hitchcock Presents, and hired the television series crew as Shamley Productions. He proposed this cost-conscious approach to Paramount but executives again refused to finance the film, telling him their sound stages were occupied or booked even though production was known to be in a slump. Hitchcock countered with the offer to finance the film personally and to film it at Universal-International if Paramount would distribute. He also deferred his director's fee of $250,000 for a 60% ownership of the film negative. This offer was finally accepted. Hitchcock also experienced resistance from producer Herbert Coleman and Shamley Productions executive Joan Harrison, who did not think the film would be a success.

Hitchcock hired writer James Cavanaugh to write a draft of the screenplay. Unsatisfied with Cavanaugh's screenplay, Hitchcock then hired up-and-coming writer Joseph Stefano to adapt the novel. The film began shooting in December 1959 and would go on to last about a month. It was filmed mostly on the backlot of Universal and in various sound stages. During shooting, Hitchcock was forced to uncharacteristically do retakes for some scenes. The final shot in the shower scene, which starts with an extreme close-up on Marion's eye and pulls up and out, proved very difficult for Leigh, since the water splashing in her face made her want to blink, and the cameraman had trouble as well since he had to manually focus while moving the camera. Retakes were also required for the opening scene, since Hitchcock felt that Leigh and Gavin were not passionate enough. Leigh had trouble saying "Not inordinately" for the real estate office scene, requiring additional retakes. Lastly, the scene in which the mother is discovered required complicated coordination of the chair turning around, Miles hitting the light bulb, and a lens flare, which proved to be the sticking point. Hitchcock forced retakes until all three elements were to his satisfaction. The famous shower scene took a week to complete and took up a third of Janet Leigh's shooting time. Psycho was released on June 16, 1960, to mixed critical reception and financial success, making thirty-two million dollars in its theatrical run. The film received four Academy Award nominations.

In 1982, author Robert Bloch published his novel Psycho II, which satirized Hollywood slasher films. Upset by this, Universal Pictures decided to make their own version that differed from Bloch's work. Originally, the film was intended as a made-for-cable production. Anthony Perkins originally turned down the offer to reprise the role of Norman Bates, but when the studio became interested in others (including Christopher Walken), Perkins quickly accepted. The studio also wanted Jamie Lee Curtis (daughter of Psycho star Janet Leigh) to play the role of Mary Loomis. Director Richard Franklin was hired to direct Psycho II because he was a Hitchcock student and even visited him on the set of Topaz, and because a year earlier, Franklin made a film called Roadgames starring Jamie Lee Curtis which was influenced by Hitchcock's 1954 film Rear Window. Franklin hired writer Tom Holland to write the screenplay after Franklin had seen The Beast Within, which Holland had written. Holland stated: "I approached it with more trepidation because I was doing a sequel to Psycho and I had an overwhelming respect for Hitchcock. You didn't want to mess it up, you really had almost a moral obligation to make something that stayed true to the original and yet updated it the same time. It really was the next step, what happens when Norman gets out". The assistant director of the original Psycho, Hilton A. Green, was contacted and asked if he wanted to produce the film. Green, fearing that Hitchcock may not have approved of sequels to his films, called Hitchcock's daughter Patricia Hitchcock and asked what she thought of the film. Patricia gave her blessing to the film, saying that her father would have loved it. Psycho II was filmed at Universal Studios in Universal City, California on Stage 24 from June 30 to August 1982.

The Bates house set was still standing from 1960, but the motel had to be reconstructed. According to Richard Franklin, filming lasted 32 days. The film was made much like the first film; it was mostly shot on the backlot of Universal and on a number of sound stages. Several props and set pieces from the original film were found by set designers John W. Corso and Julie Fletcher. The town of Fairvale (seen when Lila Loomis is tailed by Dr. Raymond) is actually Courthouse Square, which is located on the Universal Studios backlot in California. Both Franklin and Holland wanted the film to be a tribute to Hitchcock and the original film: to accomplish this, they added in various in jokes such as the scene when Mary and Norman first go into Norman's mother's room, before they turn the lights on; one can see Alfred Hitchcock's silhouette on the wall to the far right. Franklin also repeated various shots from the original film such as the shot where Norman walks into the kitchen and sets his jacket down on the chair. Perkins had difficulty working with actress Meg Tilly due to Tilly never seeing the original film and not being aware of the significance of Perkins' comeback role. Midway through production, Perkins suggested that Tilly be replaced even though half of her scenes had been shot. The ending of the film was kept secret during production. The final pages of the shooting script with the ending on it weren't distributed to cast and crew until the last day of filming. The iconic last shot of the film with Norman standing in front of the house was used as a Christmas card for various crew members. When Universal presented concept art for the one-sheet film poster, director Franklin wasn't pleased with it. It was editor Andrew London who came up with the idea of using the Christmas card photo as the film poster and also came up with the tagline: "It's 22 years later and Norman Bates is coming home". When the film opened on June 3, 1983, it earned $8,310,244 in its opening weekend and went on to gross about $34,725,000, making it one of the top hits of the year, just behind Return of the Jedi.

Psycho II was generally received well by the public and critics and was a surprise box office success, but film critics Gene Siskel and Roger Ebert both gave the film thumbs down on At the Movies, specifically for its failure to live up to the original. In Siskel's words: "I think the ghost of the original, obviously hangs over this movie, and it's too bad because it's a nicely made picture". Ebert wrote of the film: "If you've seen Psycho a dozen times and can recite the shots in the shower scene by heart, Psycho II is just not going to do it for you. But if you can accept this 1983 movie on its own terms, as a fresh start, and put your memories of Hitchcock on hold, then Psycho II begins to work. It's too heavy on plot and too willing to cheat about its plot to be really successful, but it does have its moments, and it's better than your average, run-of-the-mill slasher movie". In the British magazine Empire, film critic Kim Newman gave the film three out of five stars, calling Psycho II "a smart, darkly-comic thriller with some imaginative twists. The wittiest dark joke is that the entire world wants Norman to be mad, and 'normality' can only be restored if he's got a mummified mother in the window and is ready to kill again".

With the surprise financial and critical success of Psycho II, Universal began development on a second sequel. Writer Charles Edward Pogue was hired to write the screenplay. In Pogue's first draft of the film, it was Duane who was the killer and had intentionally come to the Bates Motel because he was obsessed with Norman. Maureen was a neurotic psychologist who had come to the motel to replace Dr. Raymond from the previous film. Pogue had intended to cast original victim Janet Leigh in the role. Universal rejected these ideas, arguing that Bates had to be the killer and Leigh was wrong for the film. Maureen's actions, however, remained virtually unchanged; her character was merely changed to a young nun. After the second draft of the screenplay was completed, it was sent to Perkins as an acting job. After Perkins read the script, he wanted to direct the film, saying he would do it for nothing. Universal agreed to this. When the film went into pre-production, Anthony Perkins asked Psycho II director Richard Franklin to co-direct the film with him, but Franklin declined. Filming for Psycho III began in June 1985. Perkins' main inspiration for the style of this film came from the film Blood Simple directed by the Coen brothers. Before production began, he even took the entire cast and crew to a screening of the film. Like the two previous films, it was mostly shot on the backlot of Universal and in a number of sound stages. Despite Psycho III being Perkins' film directorial debut, the cast and crew have said in interviews that he was enjoyable to work with. Lee Garlington, who played the waitress Myrna, commented: "I have never to this date met a director who worked equally well with both the cast and crew. He was excited to be doing it, I adored him". During filming, actor Jeff Fahey suffered an on-set injury. When filming the scene where Norman is hitting Duke with the guitar, Anthony Perkins actually hit Jeff Fahey so hard that it cut his head open and he had to get six stitches. A shot of Fahey's actual injury was used in the final film. Universal originally wanted to release the film in February 1986 but the release was moved to July 2 due to various re-shoots that included the ending. Psycho III was released on July 2, 1986, to a mixed response from critics and financial failure. It earned $3,238,400 in its opening weekend and went on to gross about $14,481,606 at the domestic box office, becoming the lowest-grossing theatrical film of the Psycho franchise.

With the financial failure of Psycho III, Universal decided to continue the Psycho franchise as a television series, Bates Motel, taking inspiration from the Friday the 13th and A Nightmare on Elm Street TV series. In this televised spin-off of Psycho, Norman Bates is portrayed by Kurt Paul, who previously stood in as a stunt double for Anthony Perkins in Psycho II and III. Perkins declined involvement in the project and even heavily boycotted it. The film was made as a pilot for a weekly anthology television series, but the series was never picked up. Thus, Universal decided to air the pilot as a made-for-TV film over the 4th of July weekend. The film received mostly negative reviews and low ratings.

A year after Bates Motel aired, production on Psycho IV: The Beginning began. Perkins wanted to direct the film and even came up with a pitch for the film along with Psycho III screenwriter Charles Edward Pogue. Psycho III, however, was a critical and financial failure, so Universal rejected that idea and Mick Garris was brought in. Joseph Stefano was the screenwriter of the original film and was brought back to write the fourth film. He had disliked the two films between I and IV, feeling that they were too commercial and catered to the conventions of slasher movies. In an interview, Stefano said: "Gearing up for Psycho IV, I decided to ignore the two sequels – like the business in II about Norman's mother".

Actress Olivia Hussey was directly offered the role of Mrs. Bates. It was the intention of writer Joseph Stefano to make her at a young age as attractive as Norman had been in the first film.

When Henry Thomas was cast as young Norman Bates, Perkins wanted to meet with him and discuss the role. In the documentary The Psycho Legacy, Thomas stated: "Looking back on it now, he knew he had to have this conversation with me but I don't think that he was really into it. He just gave me a few broad strokes and told me to play the character real, that was it".

During filming, Perkins had been diagnosed with HIV and had to receive treatment during production. Director Mick Garris has stated in numerous interviews that he had some creative control issues with Perkins. According to Garris: "He would get into long, drawn-out discussions in front of the crew, testing his director, making sure choices were not made "because it looks good", and seeing how deep the understanding of the story and process were. He could be very forceful, just shy of bullying, but also really appreciated helpful direction. I would have to say he was the most difficult and challenging actor I've ever worked with, but he ended up going on and on about how happy he was with the film. That was gratifying".

Psycho IV: The Beginning was filmed at Universal Studios Florida in Orlando, Florida from June 4 to July 13, 1990. The facade of the Bates Motel and the Bates mansion were re-created at the theme park. The production was originally to be filmed before the opening of the park but due to delays and the studio's desire to have a high-profile production on the lot, the film was shot while the park was open. This led to tourists being able to watch the filming of several scenes at the motel and house on the back lot.

The film received mixed reviews when first broadcast on Showtime. Henry Stewart of L Magazine said: "Garris evinces high-grade professionalism, but his comic-book approximations of real emotions—like desire, madness and murderlust—feel empty. Hitchcock this most certainly ain't". Ninja Dixon.com wrote: "This is a good TV movie, way better than it's [sic] reputation, and continues the tradition of great acting in the series". Cult Reviews.com wrote: "The film is shot well, the fire sequence, by Rodney Charters, is particularly stunning. The only real trouble with this film is the bad writing, which, considering that it was the baby of the scriptwriter of the original, Joseph Stefano, is very disappointing indeed". Matt Poirier of Direct to Video Connoisseur.com wrote: "This was a pretty unmemorable movie. It tried to make references to the original, like one where Perkins cuts his thumb, and the blood going into the drain mimics the blood in the famous shower scene. Way too obvious and pretty obnoxious". Despite some negative reviews, the film received high ratings with around 10 million viewers watching the premiere.

In 1998, Universal made a remake of Psycho, with Gus Van Sant as a director. The audio commentary track that accompanies the DVD release of the film, and the "making-of" documentary (Psycho Path) that the DVD includes, provide numerous details about where the film strived to remain faithful to the original, and where it diverged. Some changes are pervasive: as the film opens, it is made clear that it is set in the late 1990s, so minor changes are made throughout the dialogue to reflect the new timeframe. For example, all the references to money are updated (how much Marion Crane steals, how much a car costs, how much a hotel room costs), as are references to terms from the original script like "aspic" that would seem anachronistic in the new setting.

According to Van Sant, in the original the only fully fleshed-out character was Norman Bates; the other major characters were more iconic, purposely written and portrayed to advance the plot. Van Sant relied upon his main cast more to flesh out and make consistent their character's motivations and worked with them to determine to what degree their characters were similar to the originals. William H. Macy chose to stay true to the original, while others, such as Vince Vaughn and Julianne Moore, interpreted the dialogue and scenes from the original film differently. Moore's version of Lila Crane was much more aggressive than the one portrayed by Vera Miles, and there are differences in Marion Crane's evolving attitudes about the money she stole.

The cinematography and cinematic techniques were consistent between the two films in many memorable scenes, including the shower scene, scenes of the mother, scenes of the swamp, and the scene of Arbogast on the staircase, but other scenes changed significantly, particularly the climax, and the Dr. Simon monologue at the end, which was much shorter. Van Sant's comments from the commentary track attributes many of the updates to the need to make the film more accessible to a new audience.

The film earned $37,141,130 at the box office, $21,456,130 of which came from North America. Estimates of the production budget range from $20 million to $60 million; while promoting his 2002 film Gerry, Van Sant said he thought the producers "broke even" financially.

This version of Psycho received mostly negative reviews; it was awarded two Golden Raspberry Awards for Worst Remake or Sequel and Worst Director for Gus Van Sant, while Anne Heche was nominated as Worst Actress. Camille Paglia commented that the only reason to watch it was "to see Anne Heche being assassinated", but that "it should have been a much more important work and event than it was". A number of critics and writers viewed Van Sant's version more as an experiment in shot-for-shot remakes. Many people refer to this film as a duplicate of the 1960 film rather than a remake. Film critic Roger Ebert wrote that the film "demonstrates that a shot-by-shot remake is pointless; genius apparently resides between or beneath the shots, or in chemistry that cannot be timed or counted". Screenwriter Joseph Stefano, who worked on the 1960 version, thought that although she spoke the same lines, Anne Heche portrays Marion Crane as an entirely different character. Even Van Sant admitted that it was an experiment that proved that no one can really copy a film exactly the same way as the original. Janet Maslin gave the film a positive review, calling it an "artful, good-looking remake (a modest term, but it beats plagiarism) that shrewdly revitalizes the aspects of the real Psycho (1960) that it follows most faithfully but seldom diverges seriously or successfully from one of the cinema's most brilliant blueprints"; she noted that the "absence of anything like Anthony Perkins's sensational performance with that vitally birdlike presence and sneaky way with a double-entendre ("A boy's best friend is his mother") is the new film's greatest weakness". Critic Leonard Maltin gave the film a rating of one out of four stars, or "BOMB" compared to the four stars he gave the original. He described it as a "slow, stilted, completely pointless scene-for-scene remake of the Hitchcock classic (with a few awkward new touches to taint its claim as an exact replica)". He ultimately called it "an insult, rather than a tribute to a landmark film".

=== Continuity ===
Bates family tree

Unnamed Parents	Ray Calhoun	Francine Calhoun	John Massett	Alex Romero
Marion Crane; Marie Samuels	Sam Loomis	Lila Loomis (née Crane); Mother	Emma Spool; Mother	John Sam Bates	Norma Louise Bates; Mother	Caleb Calhoun	William "Will" Decody	Audrey Ellis
Mary Loomis	Norman Bates; Mother	Doctor Constance "Connie" Forbes-Bates	Dylan Massett	Emma Decody
Unnamed Child	Robert Newman	Unnamed Child

== Home media ==
2003 DVD box set of the first four main films (UK)

Psycho, Psycho II, Psycho III, Psycho IV: The Beginning, the Psycho remake and Bates Motel have been released on VHS. A DVD box set containing Psycho, Psycho II, Psycho III and Psycho IV: The Beginning was released in November 2003 by Universal Studios Home Entertainment in the UK. In America, Psycho was released on DVD on May 26, 1998, and a 2-Disc Special Edition with digitally remastered picture and new extras was released on October 7, 2008. As for the sequels, Good Times Home Video released Psycho II on DVD in full screen on March 2, 1999, and released Psycho III on September 28, 1999. Universal re-released Psycho II and Psycho III on September 13, 2005. A "Triple Feature" collection containing Psycho II, Psycho III and Psycho IV: The Beginning (for the first time on DVD) was released on August 14, 2007. The Psycho remake was released on DVD on August 29, 2000. On October 13, 2013, Universal released the made-for-TV movie Bates Motel on DVD. In 2010, The Psycho Legacy documentary was released as a 2-disc set with the 87 minute documentary and 3 hours of special features. Hitchcock was released on DVD and Blu-ray on March 12, 2013.

List of releases

Distributor	Title	Format(s)	Release date
MCA DiscoVision	Psycho	LaserDisc	1979
MCA Videocassette	Psycho	VHS	April 15, 1980
MCA DiscoVision	Psycho	LaserDisc	October 1981
MCA Home Video	Psycho II	VHS, LaserDisc	October 1983
MCA Home Video	Psycho	VHS, LaserDisc	November 1984
MCA Home Video	Psycho III	VHS, LaserDisc	February 12, 1987
MCA Home Video	Psycho: Hitchcock: The Collector's Edition	VHS	October 1987
MCA Home Video	Bates Motel	VHS	November 1987 (UK)
MCA Home Video	Psycho	LaserDisc	August 11, 1988
MCA/Universal Home Video	Psycho IV: The Beginning	VHS	August 8, 1991
MCA/Universal Home Video	Psycho IV: The Beginning	LaserDisc	August 15, 1991
MCA/Universal Home Video	Psycho II	LaserDisc	November 11, 1992
GoodTimes Home Video	Psycho II, Psycho III	VHS	July 13, 1994
MCA/Universal Home Video	Psycho: The Alfred Hitchcock Collection	VHS	May 23, 1995
Universal Studios Home Video	Psycho: Widescreen Edition (Digitally Mastered THX)	VHS	September 9, 1997
Universal Studios Home Video	Psycho: Universal Signature Collection	LaserDisc	May 26, 1998
Universal Studios Home Video	Psycho: Collector's Edition	DVD	May 26, 1998
GoodTimes Home Video	Psycho II	DVD	March 2, 1999
Universal Studios Home Video	Psycho (1998)	VHS	June 8, 1999
Universal Studios Home Video	Psycho (1998): Universal Signature Collection	LaserDisc	June 29, 1999
Universal Studios Home Video	Psycho: Collector's Edition (The Alfred Hitchcock Collection)	DVD	August 3, 1999
GoodTimes Home Video	Psycho III	DVD	September 28, 1999
Universal Studios Home Video	Psycho (1998): Collector's Edition	DVD	August 29, 2000
Universal Studios Home Video	Psycho: The Collection I-IV	DVD	November 19, 2003 (UK)
Universal Studios Home Entertainment	Psycho II, Psycho III	DVD	September 13, 2005
Universal Studios Home Entertainment	Psycho II, Psycho III, Psycho IV: The Beginning: Universal Triple Feature	DVD	August 14, 2007
Universal Studios Home Entertainment	Psycho: Universal Legacy Series (Special Edition)	DVD	October 7, 2008
Shout! Factory	The Psycho Legacy	DVD	October 19, 2010
Universal Studios Home Entertainment	Psycho: 50th Anniversary Edition	Blu-ray	October 19, 2010
Universal Studios Home Entertainment	Psycho	DVD	August 28, 2012
20th Century Studios Home Entertainment	Hitchcock	DVD, Blu-ray	March 12, 2013
Shout! Factory	Psycho II, Psycho III: Collector's Edition	DVD, Blu-ray	September 24, 2013
Universal Studios Home Entertainment	Bates Motel: Universal Vault Series	DVD	October 3, 2013
Universal Studios Home Entertainment	Psycho	Blu-ray+Digital	May 6, 2014
Universal Studios Home Entertainment	Psycho II, Psycho III, Psycho IV: The Beginning, Bates Motel: 4-Movie Midnight Marathon Pack	DVD	September 2, 2014
Universal Studios Home Entertainment	Psycho: Limited Edition Steelbook	Blu-ray+Digital	November 4, 2014
Universal Studios Home Entertainment	Psycho: Collectible Pop Art Series	DVD, Blu-ray	July 12, 2016
Shout! Factory	Psycho IV: The Beginning	Blu-ray	August 23, 2016
Shout! Factory	Psycho (1998)	Blu-ray	May 9, 2017
Universal Studios Home Entertainment	Psycho: Complete 4-Movie Collection	DVD	September 12, 2017
Universal Studios Home Entertainment	Psycho: Complete 4-Movie Collection	Blu-ray	November 14, 2017
Universal Studios Home Entertainment	Psycho II, Psycho III, Psycho IV: The Beginning	Blu-ray	August 28, 2018
Universal Studios Home Entertainment	Psycho: 60th Anniversary Edition	Blu-ray	September 8, 2020
Universal Studios Home Entertainment	Psycho: 4K Ultra HD + Blu-ray + Digital 4K	Blu-ray	May 25, 2021

== Reception ==
=== Box office performance ===
Film	U.S. release date	Budget	Box office revenue		
Film	U.S. release date	Budget	United States	International	Worldwide
Psycho	June 16, 1960	$806,947	$32,000,000		$32,000,000
Psycho II	June 3, 1983	$5,000,000	$34,725,000		$34,725,000
Psycho III	July 2, 1986	$8,400,000	$14,481,606		$14,481,606
Bates Motel	July 5, 1987				
Psycho IV: The Beginning	November 10, 1990	$4,000,000			
Psycho	December 4, 1998	$60,000,000	$21,485,655	$15,685,000	$37,170,655
Total		$78,206,947	$102,692,261	$15,685,000	$118,377,261

=== Critical and public response ===
Film	Critical		Public
Film	Rotten Tomatoes	Metacritic	CinemaScore
Psycho (1960)	97% (118 reviews)	97 (18 reviews)	C-
Psycho II	67% (39 reviews)	54 (13 reviews)	—N/a
Psycho III	60% (35 reviews)	58 (13 reviews)	B-
Bates Motel (1987)	—N/a	—N/a	—N/a
Psycho IV: The Beginning	29% (7 reviews)	—N/a	—N/a
Psycho (1998)	40% (77 reviews)	47 (23 reviews)	—N/a

=== Accolades ===
In 1960, Psycho received four Academy Award nominations: Best Director for Alfred Hitchcock, Best Supporting Actress for Janet Leigh, Best Cinematography for John L. Russell and Best Art Direction for Joseph Hurley, Robert Clatworthy and George Milo. All three sequels have been nominated for Saturn Awards: Psycho II for Best Supporting Actress (Meg Tilly); Psycho III for Best Horror Film and Best Actor (Anthony Perkins); and Psycho IV: The Beginning for Best Genre Television Series.

=== Legacy ===
Psycho has become one of the most recognizable films ever made. The shower scene alone has become one of the most iconic cut scenes in cinematic history. In 2000, The Guardian ranked the shower scene at No. 2 on their list of "The top 10 film moments". Psycho is frequently referenced, given homage to or spoofed in television shows such as The Simpsons (Treehouse of Horror XX), South Park, American Dad!, The Mary Tyler Moore Show, Maude, The Golden Girls and more. Films such as Scream 2, Charlie and the Chocolate Factory, Throw Momma from the Train, Scary Movie and more have referenced the film. Many critics and filmmakers have cited Psycho as the film that modernized the horror genre. Horror writer David. J. Schow stated in The Psycho Legacy: "It brought the idea that the killer in a horror film was not a mutant, didn't have dents in his head; he could look like that nice young boy from next door". The film also brought in a new level of acceptable violence and sexuality in movies. Psycho is considered by some to be the first film in the slasher film genre. In 2010, The Guardian newspaper ranked it as "the best horror film of all time". In 2021, Psycho was ranked at No. 5 by Time Out on their list of "The 100 best horror movies". Both Anthony Perkins and Janet Leigh spent the rest of their careers being typecasted by the film. Even Alfred Hitchcock's films began to decline in critical and financial popularity after the release of Psycho. Hitchcock film scholars argue that for the rest of his career, Hitchcock's films were constantly being compared to Psycho. The "Psycho" films still maintain a large fanbase. Various websites dedicated to the franchise such as The Psycho Movies.com have appeared on the internet. Books detailing the making and impact of the film such as Alfred Hitchcock and the Making of Psycho, The Moment of Psycho, Janet Leigh's Psycho: Behind The Scenes of the Classic Thriller have been published over the years. Two retrospective documentaries have been released detailing the making of all four films including The Making of Psycho (1997) and The Psycho Legacy (2010). The film also spawned the show Alfred Hitchcock: The Art of Making Movies at Universal Studios Florida, with part of the show detailing how the shower scene was filmed. In 1992, Psycho was added to the National Film Registry by the Library of Congress.

A musical stage adaptation from Neil Diamond, Psycho: The Musical, was performed from January 25 to February 9, 2019, at PULP Black Box Theatre in Atlanta, Georgia.

== Other media and merchandise ==
Various Psycho related merchandise has been sold ever since the release of the original film. Merchandise includes T-shirts, posters, DVDs, books, stationery, shot glasses, shower curtains, action figures, model house kits, pens and more. Much of the merchandise is related to the fictional Bates Motel where items commonly found in an actual motel have the Bates Motel logo on them. A Bates Motel light up sign was released in 2009. To coincide with the 50th anniversary of the release of the original film, a Psycho house model kit was released in the U.S. Props from all the films are also sold occasionally on eBay. The original one sheet poster for Psycho is worth around $3000 in mint condition. The original one sheets for Psycho II, Psycho III and Psycho IV: The Beginning are worth around $50 each.

=== Graphic novels ===
In 1992, a series of graphic novels based on the original Psycho was published by the Innovation Publishing group.

=== Video game ===
An adventure game based on the original film was released in 1988 for Commodore 64, MS-DOS, Amiga, and Atari ST.

=== The Psycho house and Bates Motel sets ===
The Bates House and Motel were constructed on the backlot at Universal City Studios in 1959 for the production of Psycho. It has been said that the house, designed by art directors Joseph Hurley and Robert Clathworthy, was loosely based on an Edward Hopper painting called "House by the Railroad". The house and motel sets were actually empty shells, also known as facades. When the house was originally built, there was no right side of the house, since the right side is never seen on camera in the original Psycho film. Interiors of the Bates house and motel were constructed on Sound stage 18-A at Universal, just a short walk from the actual exterior locations making production convenient for all involved. After production had wrapped on Psycho, the house was featured in several television productions including The Virginian, Wagon Train and Boris Karloff's Thriller.

In 1964, Universal Studios opened its patented Studio Tram Tour. The right side of the house was then added and the set was unceremoniously dubbed "The Psycho House". The house and even the motel went on to appear in several shows such as Night Gallery, The Hardy Boys/Nancy Drew Mysteries and even in films such as Invitation to a Gunfighter and Modern Problems. The motel was torn down in 1979 and the house was moved to an alternate location on the backlot to accommodate the new tour. In 1982, Richard Franklin and Hilton A. Green began a production of the film Psycho II. The house was then moved to a location that best matched the original hill and only about 40 feet of the motel was actually re-built. The rest of the motel in the film was a matte painting. TV shows during the '80s promoted the Universal Tour and prominently featured the Psycho House including Amazing Stories, Knight Rider and Diff'rent Strokes.

In 1985, the Bates Motel was fully re-built for the filming of Psycho III. For the TV pilot Bates Motel by NBC-TV network, the motel in the film was re-modeled to look very Spanish like. This version of the set remained until 1994 when the new renovations were taken away and the motel was put back to look the way it did in the original Psycho. A 1992 episode of Murder, She Wrote called "Incident in Lot 7" featured the Psycho House and Bates Motel as key locations in the series.

In 1988, plans for Psycho IV: The Beginning were underway at Universal. Plans to shoot the film in Orlando, Florida were set into motion and the film crew constructed a full-scale replica of the Bates Motel and Psycho House at the soon-to-be built Universal Studios Florida. The final dressing and painting was done by the art department crew in 1990, but the house and motel was fully built in 1988 long before the production team was assembled for the project. After production wrapped, the sets were left as attractions at the park until 1999 when it was torn down to make room for another attraction.

In 1998, the Psycho House in California was renovated to preserve the set. All of the rotting wood was replaced and the set had a new paint job. That same year, plans to remake Psycho began. Gus Van Sant originally considered to use the original house and motel sets, but the production team built a new house directly in front of the old one, and the motel was updated to look like it was from the 1960s. The new house was moved next to the original house and remained there for about three years after production. In 2003, due to popular demand, the remake's house was torn down and the motel was restored to the original way once again. To this day, the house and motel are still standing on the backlot of Universal and continue to be major tourist attractions. The tram tour features an actor playing Norman Bates coming out of cabin 1 with a body, putting it in the trunk of a car and then wielding a large knife at the tourists as the tram drives away.

=== 24 Hour Psycho ===
An art installation, 24 Hour Psycho, created by artist Douglas Gordon in 1993, and later installed in the Museum of Modern Art in New York, consists of a silent screening of Psycho, slowed down to two frames per second (from the usual 24), so that it lasts 24 hours rather than 109 minutes. 24 Hour Psycho is featured prominently in Don DeLillo's 2010 novel Point Omega.

=== The Psycho Legacy (2010) ===
In 2010, a direct-to-DVD documentary was released called The Psycho Legacy. It included interviews with cast and crew from all four Psycho films. It also featured interviews with horror filmmakers who are fans of the series. The documentary was written, produced and directed by horror journalist Robert Galluzzo, who made the documentary because of the lack of information on the sequels and also to celebrate the 50th anniversary of the release of the original film. The documentary discussed the impact and legacy of the original Psycho and the production stories of Psycho II, Psycho III and Psycho IV: The Beginning. The failed TV pilot Bates Motel and the Gus Van Sant remake were not discussed in the documentary; originally in the deleted scenes section on the DVD two short segments on the two films were supposed to be on there, but for unknown reasons they were left off of the DVD when it was released. The documentary sold well, received mostly positive reviews and garnered new interest in the series from horror fans.

=== Hitchcock (2012) ===
A film adaptation of Stephen Rebello's non-fiction book Alfred Hitchcock and the Making of Psycho, which follows the complex relationship between Alfred Hitchcock and wife Alma Reville during the filming of Psycho in 1959 was made. The film is directed by Sacha Gervasi and stars Anthony Hopkins as director Alfred Hitchcock, Helen Mirren as his wife Alma Reville, Scarlett Johansson as Janet Leigh, Jessica Biel as Vera Miles, and James D'Arcy as Anthony Perkins. Produced by The Montecito Picture Company and distributed by Fox Searchlight Pictures, the film was released on November 23, 2012, in selected cities with a worldwide release on December 14. The film has received mixed reviews from critics and moderate box office returns, with a worldwide gross of $5,337,378.

=== 78/52 documentary (2017) ===
A documentary examination of the Psycho shower scene was released on October 13, 2017, by director Alexandre O. Philippe running 91 minutes. The cast of participants included Guillermo del Toro, Peter Bogdanovich, Bret Easton Ellis, Jamie Lee Curtis, Karyn Kusama, Eli Roth, Oz Perkins, Leigh Whannell, Walter Murch, Danny Elfman, Elijah Wood, Richard Stanley and Neil Marshall.
