= The Psycho Legacy =

- DVD cover art
- Directed by: Robert Galluzzo
- Written by: Robert Galluzzo
- Produced by: Robert Galluzzo; Anthony Masi
- Starring: Anthony Perkins; Diana Scarwid; Tom Holland; Mick Garris
- Narrated by: Paul Ehlers
- Cinematography: John Torrani
- Edited by: Jon Maus
- Music by: Jermaine Stegall
- Production company: Masimedia
- Distributed by: Shout! Factory
- Release date: October 19, 2010
- Running time: 87 minutes
- Country: United States
- Language: English

The Psycho Legacy is a 2010 American independent direct-to-video documentary film that examines the history of the Psycho film franchise and the continuing legacy of the original Psycho. It also pays a tribute to actor Anthony Perkins for his portrayal of character Norman Bates. It is written and directed by Robert Galluzzo. It includes interviews with the cast and crew who were involved in the productions of Psycho, Psycho II, Psycho III and Psycho IV: The Beginning. It also features interviews with current horror filmmakers who are fans of the Psycho series.

The documentary was in production for three years and was released on DVD on October 19, 2010, in the United States and Canada.

== Cast ==
- Anthony Perkins – Norman Bates, Psycho I–IV (archive footage)
- Janet Leigh – Marion Crane, Psycho (archive footage)
- Vera Miles – Lila Crane, Psycho I–II (archive footage)
- Alfred Hitchcock – director, Psycho (archive footage)
- Hilton A. Green – assistant director, Psycho/Producer, Psycho II–IV
- Tom Holland – writer, Psycho II
- Richard Franklin – director, Psycho II (archive footage)
- Robert Loggia – Dr. Bill Raymond, Psycho II
- Kurt Paul – mother, Psycho II–III/Raymond Linette, Psycho IV
- Diana Scarwid – Maureen Coyle, Psycho III
- Lee Garlington – Myrna, Psycho II–III
- Jeff Fahey – Duane Duke, Psycho III
- Brinke Stevens – body double, Psycho III
- Katt Shea – Patsy, Psycho III
- Donovan Scott – Kyle, Psycho III
- Charles Edward Pogue – writer, Psycho III
- Mick Garris – director, Psycho IV
- Henry Thomas – Young Norman Bates, Psycho IV
- Olivia Hussey – Norma Bates, Psycho IV
- Michael Gingold – editor, Fangoria
- Stuart Gordon – director
- Adam Green – writer/director
- Rolfe Kanefsky – writer/director
- Joe Lynch – director
- David J. Schow – writer

== Development ==
The documentary was originally developed in late 2006. Robert Galluzzo said that he got the idea for the documentary when the Psycho II and Psycho III DVDs were re-released back in 2005. He was disappointed that the DVDs contained no special features and that there was little existent information about the Psycho sequels and decided to make the documentary.

Galluzzo originally went to Universal Studios with the idea of the studio financing the documentary and releasing it in a box set along with Psycho, Psycho II, Psycho III and Psycho IV: The Beginning, but Universal wasn't interested in these ideas. John Murdy, the creative director of Universal's Halloween Horror Nights, did allow Galluzzo to shoot an interview at the Bates Motel and Psycho house sets on the backlot. Pictures and footage from all the films had to be licensed from Universal, which accounted for the majority of the documentary's budget.

== Production ==
Filming began in January 2007. Galluzzo shot interviews with Psycho cast and crew members over the next three years. Galluzzo personally financed the production as he described it as a "labour of love project". Different types of digital video cameras were used to film the interviews over the three-year-long production, thus giving the documentary an aspect ratio of both fullscreen and widescreen. Galluzzo and editor Jon Maus used school equipment to edit the footage together first into a 12-minute promotional video and then the full documentary. Galluzzo stated in an interview with Retro Slashers.com: "The shoot itself was just my dear friend John Torrani, who had a Panasonic DVX-100 camera and myself. He was crazy enough to follow me on this journey and for that, I'm eternally grateful to him! Essentially, I made a ton of phone calls, sent out a ton of emails and did my best to contact as many Psycho alumni as possible to arrange interviews. Most of them are based out of California, so I'd work at my dayjob for 3 months straight, then take 2 weeks off to go shoot some interviews. And then come back and do it all over again. That's the main reason it's taken so long is because I had to go back to work and save up the money to continue shooting. This was always a labor of love, so I did anything I could to make it work and get just a tiny bit further along".

== Promotion ==
In April 2008, at the Fangoria horror convention, a Psycho reunion panel was held to promote the documentary. Many cast members attended, including Hilton A. Green, Mick Garris, Tom Holland, Kurt Paul, Juliette Cummins, Katt Shea, Cynthia Garris, Chris Hendrie and more. It was also promoted at San Diego Comic-Con in 2010

== Release ==
The documentary premiered at the 2010 Screamfest Horror Film Festival on October 16, 2010, followed by a Q&A with Mick Garris, Cynthia Garris and Katt Shea. The documentary was released on DVD in the U.S. by Shout! Factory on October 19. Special features include a rare 41 minute panel discussion with Anthony Perkins, extended interviews, deleted scenes and multiple featurettes. The documentary was released on DVD and Blu-ray in France on October 18, 2011, and on Blu-ray in Germany on February 14, 2012.

== Critical reception ==
Staci Layne Wilson of Horror.com wrote: "Overall, I think this doc is a great way for Shout! Factory and Masi Media LLC to help us all celebrate the 50th birthday of Alfred Hitchcock's beloved Psycho". Mike Gencarelli of Movie Mikes wrote: "If you add the amazing feature film to these special features you have the ultimate collection for all Psycho fans". Jason Allentoff of The Psycho Movies.com wrote: "RobG's look at this film series is incredible. It's a shame Universal hasn't taken notice". Matt Fini of Dread Central.com wrote: "As far as Psycho is now concerned, we've thankfully got this documentary so that we won't forget".

Tyler Foster of DVD Talk.com wrote: "There are things to like, about both the feature and the extras, but I can only recommend a rental – spend your money on the new Blu-ray Disc of Psycho instead". William David Lee of DVD Town.com wrote: "The retrospective may not be as in-depth as some would like, there is enough to sate the appetites of the most die-hard Psycho followers". Horror Talk.com claims "director Galluzzo does his best with a lot of fine material and keeps things moving at a decent clip, but repeat viewings will reveal the limitations that keep this from being the ultimate experience that it should be". Joe Shearer of Film Yap.com wrote: "If you're a fan of the Psycho franchise, I'd wholeheartedly recommend this DVD. If you're a classicist looking for insights on Hitchcock, I'd say you might come away from this disappointed".

Some critics noted the fact that the Robert Bloch novels were barely discussed in the documentary, and that both the failed TV pilot Bates Motel and the 1998 film remake were not mentioned, although segments covering the latter were initially slated for inclusion in the bonus features. Some critics also criticized the low-budget production values of the film, citing issues with the sound and aspect ratio of the documentary.

The documentary received a 7.0 out of 10 rating from IGN.
