= Norma Bates (Psycho) =

- Psycho character
- Olivia Hussey as Norma Bates from a publicity photo for Psycho IV: The Beginning.
- First appearance: Psycho (1959)
- Created by: Robert Bloch
- Portrayed by: Olivia Hussey, (Psycho IV: The Beginning); Vera Farmiga (Bates Motel)
- Voiced by: Virginia Gregg, Jeanette Nolan, Paul Jasmin (Psycho (1960)); Virginia Gregg (Psycho II, Psycho III); Alice Hirson (Psycho IV: The Beginning); John Kassir (Oatmeal Crisp commercial (1990)); Rose Marie (Psycho (1998))

In-universe information
- Full name: Norma Spool Bates (Psycho film sequels); Norma Louise Calhoun Bates (Bates Motel)
- Aliases: Mrs. Bates; Mother
- Gender: Female
- Occupation: Former owner of the Bates Motel
- Family: Ray Calhoun (deceased father; Bates Motel only); Francine Calhoun (deceased mother; Bates Motel only); Emma Spool (deceased sister; film canon only); Caleb Calhoun (deceased brother; Bates Motel only); Kate Massett (granddaughter/grandniece; Bates Motel only)
- Spouses: John/Sam Bates (deceased husband); John Massett (ex-husband; Bates Motel only); Alex Romero (deceased third husband; Bates Motel only)
- Children: Norman Bates (son, deceased in Bates Motel); Dylan Massett (son/nephew; Bates Motel only); Robert Newman (son; Bloch's novels only)
- Relatives: Dr. Constance "Connie" Forbes-Bates (daughter-in-law; film canon only); Emma Decody (daughter-in-law; Bates Motel only)

Norma Bates (née Spool or Calhoun, also known simply as Mrs. Bates) is a fictional character created by American author Robert Bloch in his 1959 thriller novel Psycho. She is the deceased mother and victim of serial killer Norman Bates, who had recreated her in his mind as a murderous alternate personality.

Although an important character to the Psycho story, Norma is deceased from the beginning of the films. She is not depicted as a living character until the prequel Psycho IV: The Beginning (1990), where she is portrayed by Olivia Hussey. Vera Farmiga later portrayed Norma in the television series Bates Motel (2013–2017).

== Character overview ==
Both the 1959 novel, and its 1960 film adaptation explain that after the death of her husband, Norma (whose maiden name is never revealed in the novels) raises her son Norman with cruelty: she forbids him to have a life away from her, and teaches him that sexual intercourse is sinful and that all women (except herself) are whores. The novel also suggests that their relationship may have been incestuous.

For many years, Norma and Norman live together in the (fictional) small town of Fairvale, California "as if there is no one else in the world". When Norman is a teenager, his mother meets Joe Considine (Chet Rudolph in Psycho IV: The Beginning) and plans to marry. Considine convinces Norma to open a motel. Norman grows furiously jealous, believing that Norma has abandoned him for her fiancé, and murders them both with strychnine. He then stages it like murder-suicide, making it look as if Norma had killed Considine and then herself.

Unable to bear the loss of his mother, Norman steals Norma's corpse and mummifies it in the fruit cellar, and speaks to it as if his mother were still alive. He also speaks to himself in her voice and frequently dresses in her clothes; in his own mind, he becomes his mother in order to escape the awareness of her death and the guilt of having murdered her. The "Mother" personality is as possessive and cruel as Norma had been in life; "Mother" dominates and belittles him, forbids him to have friends, and kills any woman whom he feels attracted to. When Norman regains consciousness, he discovers the crime he is convinced his mother has committed, and destroys the evidence.

== Psycho (novel and film) ==
Norma Bates' mummified corpse in Psycho (1960)

One of "Mother"'s victims is Marion Crane (Janet Leigh), who flees to the Bates Motel after stealing money from her employer. When she checks into the motel, Norman (Anthony Perkins) is smitten, and invites her to have dinner with him. This arouses "Mother"'s ire, and she threatens to kill Marion if Norman lets her into the house. He defies her and has dinner in the motel office with Marion, who takes pity on him and gently suggests that he put his mother in a mental institution. He angrily rejects the suggestion, however, and insists that his mother is perfectly sane. After Marion retires to her room, Norman becomes "Mother" and kills Marion in the shower. When Norman regains consciousness, he disposes of Marion's corpse in a nearby swamp, covering up what he believes to be his mother's crime.

Marion's employer hires private investigator Arbogast (Martin Balsam) to find her, and he goes to the motel and questions Norman. Norman mentions that Marion had spoken with his mother, but he refuses to let Arbogast see her. Suspicious, Arbogast goes to the house, where "Mother" kills him as well. Marion's sister Lila (Vera Miles), and boyfriend, Sam Loomis (John Gavin), soon arrive, suspecting Norman of killing Marion for the money. Lila discovers Mrs. Bates' corpse while searching the house; moments later, Norman attacks her as "Mother", only to be subdued by Sam. Norman is then arrested and institutionalized, and the "Mother" persona takes complete, permanent control of his mind.

== Film sequels ==
=== Psycho II ===
In the film Psycho II (unrelated to Bloch's novel of the same name), 22 years later, Norman Bates, now supposedly cured, is released from the institution and returns home. He soon receives notes and phone calls supposedly from Mrs. Bates. Norman takes a job at a local diner and befriends Emma Spool (Claudia Bryar), the cook, and a waitress named Mary Samuels (Meg Tilly). Norman offers Mary a room in his house, and she reluctantly accepts. At about this time, a series of mysterious murders are committed by a woman with a knife to people who come to the motel and the house.

Norman's sanity begins to unravel as he starts to believe that his mother is committing the murders. His psychiatrist, Dr. Bill Raymond (Robert Loggia), shows him Mrs. Bates' corpse and reveals to him that Mary Samuels is actually Mary Loomis, Sam Loomis' daughter, and is plotting with her mother, Lila, to drive him crazy again in order to get him recommitted; they both dress up as Norman's mother and appear through the window of her bedroom. Mary believes that the murderer is hiding in Norman's house, and when Norman explains to Mary that the murderer might be his real mother, she speculates that he might have been adopted.

The murderer eventually kills Lila. When Mary and Norman return to the house, Norman receives a phone call from Dr. Raymond; in his mind, however, the phone call is from his mother. Mary, disturbed, tries to convince Norman to stop answering the phone by dressing up as his mother, complete with a butcher knife. Mary accidentally kills Dr. Raymond, who has come to the house to catch Mary, and Norman tries to hide her from the police. Mary discovers Lila's corpse hidden in a pile of coal, and, convinced Norman is the murderer, tries to kill him. The police intervene just in time however, and shoot her dead.

That night, Mrs. Spool visits Norman and tells him that she is his real mother, and that Norma Bates was actually his aunt; Spool had been put in a mental institution shortly after giving birth to Norman, and her sister, Norma, had adopted him and told him that he was her son. Spool then reveals that she had committed the murders in order to protect Norman. He bludgeons her to death with a shovel, and carries her corpse up to Mrs. Bates' room, where the "Mother" personality takes control of his mind once again.

=== Psycho III ===
One month later, a reporter named Tracy Venable (Roberta Maxwell) latches on to the history of the Bates/Spool families; her research leads her to the story of a love triangle between Norman's father, John, and the Spool sisters, Norma and Emma. Emma killed John in a jealous rage after Norma stole him away from her, and abducted the young Norman, convincing herself he was the child she had with John. Emma was arrested and institutionalized, and Norman was returned to his mother.

By this point in the series, Norman has begun murdering young women again under the control of the “Mother” personality. He finds some hope for redemption when he meets and falls in love with a young woman named Maureen Coyle (Diana Scarwid), but "Mother" eventually wins out and kills her. Tracy finds Norman and tells him the truth about his parentage, and Norman destroys Mrs. Spool's corpse, attempting to break free of "Mother"'s control. He is arrested and sent back to the institution, but proclaims that he is finally free.

=== Psycho IV: The Beginning ===
Psycho IV: The Beginning, the fourth and final film in the series, retcons the revelations of the second and third film, supplying that Norman's father was stung to death by bees, removing all references to Emma Spool and retelling much of Norman's and his mother's past from the original film. It is implied in the film that Mrs. Bates suffered from schizophrenia, which Norman inherits. Norman has been released from the institution and is now married. When Norman finds out that his wife, Connie (Donna Mitchell), is pregnant, he decides to kill her to prevent another of his "cursed" line from entering the world. He relents after his wife professes her love for him, however, and decides to rid himself of the past once and for all by burning down his mother's house. During this act, he sees visions of his mother mocking and tormenting him, but perseveres and destroys the house. At the end of the film, he is finally free of his mother's voice, which demands to be let out.

== Television ==
=== Bates Motel (film) ===
The television spin-off movie and series pilot changes the backstory between Norman Bates' parents (here named Jake and Gloria Bates) prior to the events of Psycho. In this continuity, Mrs. Bates killed her husband because she thought he was cheating on her. She then lost her mind and spent all her time staring out her bedroom window, wearing black funeral clothes while waiting for him to return. Twenty-seven years after the events of the original film, Norman (Kurt Paul) dies of old age in the asylum, leaving his motel and house to his friend and fellow inmate, Alex West (Bud Cort). Alex comes to believe that the motel is haunted by Mrs. Bates' ghost. He eventually discovers that the "haunting" is a ruse perpetrated by bank manager Tom Fuller (Gregg Henry), who is trying to scare Alex into selling him the motel so he can renovate it. The remains of Norman's parents were found buried on the grounds of the motel. When recovering the remains of Mrs. Bates, the sheriff said that the body "was never found", which seems to conflict with the original Psycho, where Mrs. Bates' corpse is present in the basement where Norman is finally captured by Sam Loomis.

=== Bates Motel (TV series) ===
Norma Bates is a main character in the A&E psychological horror drama television series Bates Motel, a contemporary prequel to the 1960 film Psycho, set in the present day. Norma is portrayed in the series by Vera Farmiga. She is extremely possessive and protective of her son Norman and does everything she can to keep him to herself. This, along with several other traumas Norman suffered as a child, results in his developing an alternate personality, "Mother", who kills anyone whom she believes poses a threat to him or gets in the way of their relationship.

On the show, Norma's middle name is Louise. Her parents' names are revealed to be Ray and Francine "Frannie" Calhoun, and she describes her life with them as having been unhappy; her father was an abusive alcoholic while her mother was "sedated all the time." She was born and raised in Akron, Ohio. As an adult, Norma owns and drives around in a light-green Mercedes-Benz W116 as her personal means of transportation throughout the series. The vehicle is later inherited by Norman who takes over ownership of the car in the final season after her death.

In the pilot episode, Norma buys a motel in the coastal town of White Pine Bay, Oregon, and moves there with Norman (Freddie Highmore) following the death of her husband Sam Bates (David Cubitt) in Arizona. The motel's former owner, Keith Summers (W. Earl Brown) breaks into the Bates' house and rapes Norma. Norman intervenes and subdues Summers, but Norma kills him in a fit of rage. She and Norman then dispose of the body. She later reveals that Sam was an abusive alcoholic and that Norman had killed him while in a dissociative state; she bought the motel and moved them away to protect him. A later episode reveals that Sam had raped Norma in a drunken rage after she tried to leave him, and that six-year-old Norman had witnessed the assault; it is implied that this trauma fractured Norman's psyche.

In this continuity, Norma has another son, Dylan Massett (Max Thieriot), who was conceived when she was raped as a teenager by her older brother, Caleb Calhoun (Kenny Johnson). Norma used her pregnancy to escape from her troubled home life; she married her then-boyfriend, John Massett, and passed off her unborn child as his own. She would later divorce John to marry Sam, becoming estranged from Dylan and favoring Norman, her son with Sam, instead.

When Norman's sanity begins to deteriorate, Norma marries the town sheriff, Alex Romero (Nestor Carbonell), so she can use his insurance coverage to pay for Norman to be treated in a mental institution. While the marriage is at first merely a financial arrangement, they eventually fall in love. After Norman is released from the institution and finds out that Norma is married, he grows insanely jealous and tries to kill himself and Norma by flooding the house with carbon monoxide while his mother sleeps. Romero arrives at the house in time to revive Norman, but finds that Norma is already dead. Romero finds out what happened and swears revenge, but is arrested for perjury before he can do anything. Meanwhile, Norman cannot bear losing his mother, so he digs up her corpse and assumes her personality to preserve the illusion of her being alive.

Two years later, Norman is running the motel and living alone in the house with Norma's corpse, which he keeps frozen and preserved in the cellar. Romero, who is in prison for perjury, sends a hitman to kill Norman, but "Mother" takes control and kills the assassin. Caleb learns of Norma's death and comes after Norman, so "Mother" helps Norman take him hostage, but cannot bring herself to kill him. The Bates' neighbor Chick Hogan (Ryan Hurst) accidentally runs Caleb over, and "Mother" helps him and Norman dispose of the body. When Norman falls for Madeline Loomis (Isabelle McNally), a lonely housewife who bears an uncanny resemblance to Norma, and whose husband Sam (Austin Nichols) is cheating on her, "Mother" becomes jealous and acts out by taking over Norman's mind and making him have sex with a man at a gay bar while dressed in Norma's clothes. Norman finally begins to suspect that "Mother" is not real, and she confirms that he created her in his mind to deal with things that he could not, such as his abusive father.

When Sam's mistress Marion Crane (Rihanna) checks into the motel, Norman fears that "Mother" will kill her, and tells her to leave and never come back. Sam soon arrives at the motel looking for Marion, and "Mother" convinces Norman to stab him to death in the shower.

Dylan comes to see Norman after learning of Norma's death, and they get into a fight that ends with Norman assaulting his half-brother at "Mother"'s instigation. Terrified of what he might do, Norman calls 911 and confesses to murdering Sam. After Sheriff Jane Greene (Brooke Smith) finds the bodies of Norman's other victims, "Mother" takes control of Norman's mind and tries to make sure that he escapes punishment.

When Romero—who had earlier escaped from prison—takes Norman captive, "Mother" urges Norman to kill him, but not before he confronts Norman with the reality that he killed his mother. After Norman finally admits to himself that he killed Norma, "Mother" appears to him and tells him she is leaving, as there is no longer anything she can protect him from. Norman later invites Dylan to a "family dinner" with Norma's corpse at the head of the table. When Dylan tells Norman that Norma is dead, Norman attacks him, forcing Dylan to shoot him in self-defense. As he dies, Norman sees a vision of his mother embracing him.

== Characterization ==
Norma Bates is the fictional counterpart to Augusta Gein, murderer Ed Gein's mother; a domineering, fanatical woman who preached to her sons about the innate immorality of the world and her belief that all women (apart from herself) were evil and instruments of the devil.

Norma is not strictly a character in the novel by Bloch, and her presence is indicated only as a voice and a corpse in the first three Psycho films.

For Psycho (1960), Alfred Hitchcock hired six uncredited people to play the mother. Norma Bates was played by Mitzi Koestner, Anna Dore, and Margo Epper as body doubles; and voiced by Virginia Gregg, Jeanette Nolan, and Paul Jasmin (a friend of Anthony Perkins). The voices were thoroughly mixed, except for the last speech, which is all Gregg's.

Norma Bates was introduced as a living character in Psycho IV: The Beginning. Olivia Hussey was directly offered the role.

== Portrayals ==
Virginia Gregg, Jeanette Nolan, and Paul Jasmin voiced the corpse of Norma Bates in Hitchcock's 1960 film adaptation of Bloch's novel. Only Gregg did Norma's voice in Psycho II and Psycho III. Alice Hirson provided the voice of Norma's corpse in Psycho IV: The Beginning. John Kassir voiced Norma's silhouette in a 1990 Oatmeal Crisp cereal commercial featuring Anthony Perkins reprising his role as Norman Bates. Rose Marie voiced Norma's corpse in Gus Van Sant's 1998 version of Psycho. Olivia Hussey portrayed Norma as a living character in Psycho IV. Vera Farmiga portrayed Norma as a living character in the TV series Bates Motel. For her performance, Farmiga was nominated for a Primetime Emmy Award in 2013, and won a Saturn Award in 2014 and a People's Choice Award in 2017.

== Appearances ==
=== Novels ===
- Psycho, (1959)
  - As a corpse.

=== Film ===
- Psycho, (1960)
  - As a corpse, voiced by Virginia Gregg, Jeanette Nolan, and Paul Jasmin.
- Psycho II, (1983)
  - As a corpse, and in a flashback, voiced by Virginia Gregg.
- Psycho III, (1986)
  - As a voice by Virginia Gregg.
- Bates Motel, (1987)
  - As a corpse (named Gloria Bates).
- Psycho IV: The Beginning, (1990)
  - As a main character, portrayed by Olivia Hussey, and as a corpse, voiced by Alice Hirson.
- Psycho, (1998)
  - As a corpse, voiced by Rose Marie.

=== Television ===
- Oatmeal Crisp commercial, (1990)
  - As a silhouette, voiced by John Kassir.
- Bates Motel, (2013–2017)
  - As a main character (named Norma Louise Bates), portrayed by Vera Farmiga, who was nominated for a Primetime Emmy Award and won a Saturn Award and a People's Choice Award for her performance.

=== Comics ===
- Alfred Hitchcock's Psycho, (1992)
  - As a corpse.
