= Emma Spool =

- Psycho character
- First appearance: Psycho II
- Last appearance: Psycho III
- Created by: Tom Holland
- Portrayed by: Claudia Bryar; Kurt Paul (stunt double)

In-universe information
- Full name: Emily Spool
- Alias: Mrs. Spool
- Gender: Female
- Family: Norma Bates (deceased sister); Norman Bates (nephew); John Bates (deceased brother-in-law)

Emma Spool (also known simply as Mrs. Spool) is a fictional character created by screenwriter Tom Holland for the 1983 film Psycho II. Portrayed by Claudia Bryar, Spool serves as the primary antagonist. More attention is given to her character in Psycho III, although she only appears as a corpse.

== In the Psycho sequels ==
=== Psycho II ===
Emma Spool is a waitress at a diner in the (fictional) town Fairvale, California. She urges owner Ralph Statler to hire Norman Bates (Anthony Perkins) as the cook's helper. Bates has been recently released from a mental institution, institutionalized since being identified as a killer in the original 1960 film Psycho. Statler agrees, and Norman meets with Mrs. Spool. At about this time, a series of brutal murders occur that bear a similarity to the ones Norman committed years before.

In the film's final scene, Mrs. Spool visits Norman and reveals to him that she is his real mother. She tells him that she bore him when she was very young and out of wedlock. She was put away by the state, and her sister Norma Bates took Norman in her care, raising him as her son. Mrs. Spool, while telling him this, is unaware she is actually sipping tea which Norman has poisoned. As the poison takes effect, Spool begins to cough. Norman picks up a nearby shovel and hits her on the head, killing her. Norman takes his new "Mother" upstairs and begins talking to himself in Spool's voice, recreating his murderous "Mother" persona.

=== Psycho III ===
A month later, Mrs. Spool's murder remains undiscovered; she is thought missing. By now, Norman has begun his murder spree anew, keeping and communicating with Mrs. Spool's preserved corpse in the same way he had with Mrs. Bates. A reporter, Tracy Venable (Roberta Maxwell), arrives in Fairvale to investigate the murders. She quickly suspects Norman.

Eventually, Duane Duke (Jeff Fahey), an itinerant musician, discovers the truth about Mrs. Spool. He tries to use Norman's secret to extort money from him. Tracy eventually discovers the truth behind Mrs. Spool's disappearance, as well as her true identity and history: Spool was in fact Norman's aunt, and killed Norman's father, John, in a jealous rage after he left her for her sister. Spool then kidnapped the child Norman, having convinced herself that he was her own. She was arrested and institutionalized, and Norman was returned to Mrs. Bates.

Tracy confronts Norman, who is now assuming the "Mother" personality. She confronts Norman with the truth about Spool and his mother. At last knowing the truth, Norman rebels against "Mother" and destroys Spool's corpse.

== Continuity ==
The 1990 sequel/prequel Psycho IV: The Beginning seemingly retcons the character of Emma Spool. In this film, Norman's father is stung to death by bees and not by Emma. The events of the sequels are briefly mentioned by Norman in the present setting as he mentions causing more murders some years earlier.

== Production details ==
- For the murder of Mrs. Spool in Psycho II (being hit with a shovel on the head), a special effects dummy was used that is seen in the interview of Andrew London (editor of Psycho II) on the official website of the Psycho movies. Although the Spool dummy can be seen for a brief second, Claudia Bryar performed Mrs. Spool's death.

Mrs. Spool was also played by Kurt Paul, who was Claudia Bryar's stunt double for the murder scenes in Psycho II. Paul later played Norman Bates in the 1987 television film Bates Motel and the Norman Bates-like coroner "Norman Blates" in the sitcom Sledge Hammer! (1986–88).
