= Psycho IV: The Beginning =

1990 television film by Mick Garris

- Promotional release poster
- Genre: Horror; Slasher; Thriller
- Based on: Characters created by Robert Bloch
- Written by: Joseph Stefano
- Directed by: Mick Garris
- Starring: Anthony Perkins; Olivia Hussey; CCH Pounder; Warren Frost; Donna Mitchell; Henry Thomas
- Music by: Graeme Revell (Note: Original themes composed by Bernard Herrmann.)
- Country of origin: United States
- Original language: English

Production
- Executive producer: Hilton A. Green
- Producers: George Zaloom; Les Mayfield
- Production location: Universal Studios Florida
- Cinematography: Rodney Charters
- Editor: Charles Bornstein
- Running time: 96 minutes
- Production companies: MCA Television Entertainment; Smart Money Productions

Original release
- Network: Showtime
- Release: November 10, 1990

Psycho IV: The Beginning is a 1990 American slasher television film directed by Mick Garris, and starring Anthony Perkins, Henry Thomas, Olivia Hussey, Warren Frost, Donna Mitchell, and CCH Pounder. It serves as both the third sequel and a prequel to Alfred Hitchcock's Psycho (1960), focusing on the early life of Norman Bates and the flashbacks that took place prior to the events of the original film. It is the fourth and final film in the original Psycho franchise, and Perkins's final appearance in the series before his death in 1992.

The film was written by Joseph Stefano, who also wrote the screenplay of the original film. The musical score was composed by Graeme Revell and the title theme and original themes by Bernard Herrmann from the 1960 film was used. Psycho IV: The Beginning premiered on Showtime on November 10, 1990, as part of a Psycho retrospective hosted by Janet Leigh.

== Plot ==
A once-again rehabilitated Norman Bates is now married to a psychiatrist named Connie and is expecting a child. Norman secretly fears that the child will inherit his mental illness. One evening, he hears radio talk show host Fran Ambrose discussing the topic of matricide with her guest Dr. Leo Richmond, Norman's former psychologist. Norman calls into the radio show, using the alias "Ed", to tell his story.

Norman's narrative is seen as a series of flashbacks set in the 1940s and 1950s, some slightly out of order. When Norman is six years old, his father John dies, leaving him in the care of his mother, Norma. Over the years, Norma (who is implied to suffer from schizophrenia and borderline personality disorder) dominates her son, brutally beating him for the smallest infraction, throwing him out in the rain when naked, teaching him that sex is sinful, dressing him up as a girl, and smearing lipstick on his face as punishment for getting an erection during incestuous foreplay (that Norma herself initiated). She forces him to urinate like a female by instructing him to squat over a pitcher. She also takes her frustration out on Norman when business at the motel fails due to the new interstate routing potential customers away from their location.

The two live in contented isolation until, in 1949, she becomes engaged to a brutish man named Chet Rudolph, who openly bullies Norman; much to Norma's delight. Driven over the edge with jealousy and sick of Chet's constant abuse, Norman kills both of them by serving them poisoned iced tea. He disposes of Chet's body before stealing and preserving his mother's corpse. He develops a split personality in which he "becomes" his mother to suppress the guilt of murdering her; whenever this personality takes over, it drives him to dress in his mother's clothes, put on a wig, and talk to himself in her voice. As "Mother", he murders Holly and Gloria, two local women who try to seduce him during their stay at the motel. After these and other killings, Norman awakens, convinced that "Mother" is responsible, and destroys the evidence.

In the present day, Dr. Richmond realizes "Ed" is Norman and tries to convince Ambrose to trace the calls. Richmond's worries are dismissed. Norman fears he will go insane and kill again. He tells Fran that Connie got pregnant against his wishes and that he does not want to create another "monster". He then tells Fran he realizes that his mother is dead, but he plans to kill Connie "with my own hands, just like the first time".

Norman takes his wife to his mother's house with the thought of killing her and her unborn baby. Connie reminds Norman that it was his own choice to go insane and do the things he did, reassuring Norman that their child will not be a monster with their guidance. He realizes the truth about having freedom of choice, and he drops his knife. Finally, Norman impulsively sets fire to the house where all his unhappiness began. As he tries to escape the flames, he hallucinates that he sees his victims, Norma and eventually himself preserving her corpse. Norman barely flees the burning house alive.

Examining the ruins of the house the next day, Norman happily declares himself finally free of his mother. As he and Connie leave, the wooden cellar doors of the house close on a rocking chair that continues to rock, at which point "Mother" screams for Norman to release her before the screen cuts to black and the sound of a baby crying is heard.

== Cast ==
- Anthony Perkins as Norman Bates
  - Henry Thomas as Young Norman Bates
- Olivia Hussey as Norma Bates
  - Alice Hirson as Norma Bates (voice only)
- CCH Pounder as Fran Ambrose
- Warren Frost as Dr. Leo Richmond
- Donna Mitchell as Connie Bates
- Thomas Schuster as Chet Rudolph
- Sharen Camille as Holly
- Bobbi Evors as Gloria
- Doreen Chalmers as Mrs. Lane
- John Landis as Mike Calvecchio
- Kurt Paul as Raymond Linette

== Production ==
There is no question that having two sequels before made it a lot easier. Psycho II would have been far more intimidating. Parts II and III are fun. Tony would kill me if I said this, but III is a little bit campier—his performance was definitely a campy approach. This is very straightforward and serious. It’s more disturbing in a deeper sense. It’s much more somber. It’s the least humorous of the Psycho films—I hope.

— Mick Garris, 1990

Psycho IV: The Beginning was filmed at Universal Studios Florida in Orlando, Florida from June 4 to July 1, 1990. The facade of the Bates Motel and the Bates mansion were re-created at the theme park. The production was originally to be filmed before the opening of the park, but due to delays and the studio's desire to have a high-profile production on the lot, the film was shot while the park was open. This led to tourists being able to watch the filming of several scenes at the motel and house on the back lot. Anthony Perkins wanted Noel Black, who directed him in Pretty Poison, to direct the film, and he even came up with a pitch for the film along with Psycho III's screenwriter, Charles Edward Pogue. Since Psycho III was a critical and financial failure, Universal rejected their idea and Mick Garris was brought in. Joseph Stefano, the screenwriter of the original film, was brought back to write the fourth film. He had disliked the first two Psycho sequels, feeling that they were too commercial and catered to the conventions of slasher films. In an interview, Stefano stated: "Gearing up for Psycho IV, I decided to ignore the two sequels – like the business in II about Norman's mother". (Not all of the events of the second and third movies are ignored, however, as Norman in the present references murders he committed four years earlier).

Actress Olivia Hussey was directly offered the role of Mrs. Norma Bates. It was the intention of writer Joseph Stefano to make her at a young age as attractive as Norman had been in the first film. When Henry Thomas was cast as the young Norman Bates, Perkins wanted to meet with him and discuss the role. Thomas commented in the documentary The Psycho Legacy: "Looking back on it now, he knew he had to have this conversation with me, but I don't think that he was really into it. He just gave me a few broad strokes and told me to play the character real, that was it". During filming, Perkins was diagnosed with HIV and had to receive treatment during production. Director Mick Garris has stated in numerous interviews that he had some creative control issues with Perkins: "He would get into long, drawn-out discussions in front of the crew, testing his director, making sure choices were not made 'because it looks good' and seeing how deep the understanding of the story and process were. He could be very forceful, just shy of bullying, but also really appreciated helpful direction. I would have to say he was the most difficult and challenging actor I've ever worked with, but he ended up going on and on about how happy he was with the film. That was gratifying".

== Release and reception ==
=== Critical reception ===
The film was met with mixed reviews when it was first broadcast on Showtime. Henry Stewart of L Magazine said: "Garris evinces high-grade professionalism, but his comic-book approximations of real emotions—like desire, madness and murderlust—feel empty. Hitchcock this most certainly ain't". Some reviewers received the film with greater optimism. Ninjadixon.com stated: "This is a good TV movie, way better than its reputation, and continues the tradition of great acting in the series". Cultreviews.com said: "The film is shot well, the fire sequence, by Rodney Charters, is particularly stunning. The only real trouble with this film is the bad writing, which, considering that it was the baby of the scriptwriter of the original, Joseph Stefano, is very disappointing indeed". Matt Poirier of Directtovideoconnoisseur.com wrote: "This was a pretty unmemorable movie. It tried to make references to the original, like one where Perkins cuts his thumb, and the blood going into the drain mimics the blood in the famous shower scene. Way too obvious and pretty obnoxious". Despite some negative reviews, the film received high Nielsen ratings with around 10 million viewers watching the premiere. Two years after the film was released, it was nominated for a Saturn Award for Best Genre Television Series at the 18th Saturn Awards.

Although Stefano did not immediately disclose his decision to ignore the two sequels (thus ignoring the character of Norman's aunt Emma Spool), horror fiction writer and critic Robert Price has noted that "Psycho IV seems to be intended as a direct sequel to the original Psycho, with no reference to Psycho II or III. Norman may have been healed and released from his first confinement, not from the confinement that takes place at the end of Psycho III". Horror writer James Futch regards this as a defect, complaining that the film "ignores much of the Psycho mythology".

Psycho IV: The Beginning holds a 33% rating on Rotten Tomatoes based on six reviews.

=== Home media ===
Psycho IV: The Beginning was released on VHS and Laserdisc by MCA/Universal Home Video in 1991. It was later re-issued on VHS by GoodTimes Home Video, under license from Universal Studios Home Video in 1998.

The film was released on DVD in Region 1 as part of a triple feature package with Psycho II and Psycho III on August 14, 2007, by Universal Studios Home Entertainment. Universal has also released some four-title Region 2 packages that include the 1960 original. A single-disc Region 2 version of Psycho IV (titled Psychose: L'origine) was released in France in 2007 by Aventi Distribution.

Shout! Factory, under their Scream Factory logo, released the film on Blu-ray in August 2016.

== See also ==
- Bates Motel, 1987 network television movie and proposed series pilot
- Psycho, a near shot-for-shot remake of the original directed by Gus Van Sant in 1998
- The Psycho Legacy, 2010 documentary about the series
- Bates Motel, 2013 reboot TV series set in the present day and in Oregon instead of California
