= Hilton A. Green =

American film producer

Hilton A. Green (March 3, 1929 – October 2, 2013), also known as Hilton Green, was an American film producer and assistant director.

He was best known for being the assistant director of Alfred Hitchcock's Psycho (1960), Marnie, and many episodes of Alfred Hitchcock Presents.

He is the son of director Alfred E. Green and actress Vivian Reed. Green went on to produce such films as Psycho II, Psycho III, Psycho IV: The Beginning, Home Alone 3, and Sixteen Candles. He began his career as an assistant director after completing college. His early work was mainly with TV shows

== Filmography ==
Year	Film	Credit	Notes
1955	The Desperate Hours	Assistant director	Uncredited
1960	Psycho	Assistant director	
1964	Marnie	Assistant director; unit manager	Uncredited as assistant director
1968	Three Guns for Texas	Production manager	
1969	Backtrack!	Production manager	
1976	Family Plot	Production manager	Uncredited
1983	Psycho II	Producer	
1984	Sixteen Candles	Producer	
1986	Psycho III	Producer	
1990	Psycho IV: The Beginning	Executive producer	TV movie
1992	Encino Man	Executive producer	As Hilton Green
1993	Son in Law	Executive producer	As Hilton Green
1997	Home Alone 3	Producer	As Hilton Green
1997	The Making Of Psycho	Himself	Documentary
1997	Zeus and Roxanne	Executive producer	As Hilton Green
1998	Psycho	Technical advisor	
2000	All About The Birds	Himself	Documentary
2000	The Trouble with Marnie	Himself	Documentary
2001	Plotting Family Plot	Himself	Documentary
2010	The Psycho Legacy	Himself	Documentary
