= George Linder =

Film producer

- Born: Salzburg, Austria

George Linder is a film producer and entrepreneur.

== Early life and education ==
Linder was born in Europe to Austrian parents. His father Bert Linder (1911–1997) was a survivor of both Auschwitz and Bergen-Belsen death camps.

Linder graduated from California State University Northridge with a degree in anthropology.

== Career ==
Linder's first venture after graduation was Euro-Imports, which specialized in distribution of lightweight racing bicycles from overseas and sponsored several teams and events on the nascent American racing circuit. In 1980 Linder segued to building and "selling high-technology, lightweight wheelchairs through his Quadra Medical Corporation." Quadra's models featured "aircraft alloy frames...wheel hubs [that were] frictionized coated [and] adjustable back height."

The development and production of the feature film The Running Man (1987) was Linder's first experience as a film producer. As multiple commentators have recounted, Linder, along with Chris Cosby and Mel Friedman, discovered the novel written by Stephen King under the pseudonym Richard Bachman, and Linder optioned the film rights, and co-wrote the first draft of the screenplay with Cosby and Friedman. Once the project was green-lit by TriStar Pictures and other companies, Linder's work as producer included the above-the-line decisions in particular the casting of fellow Austrian Arnold Schwarzenegger as the lead character Ben Richards. To underscore the parallel between the futuristic world of the film and the actual events of World War II, Linder introduced the actor to his father Bert, the holocaust survivor. In 2019 Linder was interviewed by the New York Post for an article highlighting how 1980s science fiction anticipated many aspects of today's reality, where he pointed out that “the lines have blurred between reality and news and propaganda and entertainment” and the influence of pervasive reality shows, an alumnus of which is now chief executive.

During the same period, Linder partnered with writer/director Richard Rothstein on several projects. Together they developed the idea for the Universal Soldier series of films and the pilot Bates Motel, which Universal aired as a television film. Other projects that Linder has developed include Midnight Graffiti for Peter Guber at Mandalay Entertainment and Club Fed for Bill Mechanic at Pandemonium. In 2002 Linder was Executive Producer of the Austrian feature She, Me & Her (German title: Meine Schwester das Biest). Shortly thereafter Linder became a partner with writer/producer/director Alain Silver in Untitled LLC. Their initial project was Nightcomer (a.k.a. Blood Cure). Untitled was also a production company on Radio Mary (2017).

In 2024 Linder will be executive producer of the remake of The Running Man to be directed by Edgar Wright with Glen Powell in the title role. Principal photography is set to begin in November.
