= Warren Frost =

American actor

- Frost in an episode of Twin Peaks (1990-91)
- Born: June 5, 1925; Newburyport, Massachusetts, U.S.
- Died: February 17, 2017 (aged 91); Middlebury, Vermont, U.S.
- Occupation: Actor
- Years active: 1957–2017
- Spouse: Virginia Calhoun (m. 1949)
- Children: Mark, Lindsay, Scott
- Relatives: Lucas Giolito (grandson)

Warren Frost (June 5, 1925 – February 17, 2017) was an American actor. His work was mainly in theater, but he worked in films and television sporadically from 1958. He is known for television roles on Matlock and Seinfeld, and particularly as Doctor Hayward on Twin Peaks, a series co-created by his son Mark Frost. He has also appeared in TV movies, such as Psycho IV: The Beginning (1990) and The Stand (1994).

== Early life ==
Frost was born in 1925 in Newburyport, Massachusetts, and was raised in the Bronx and Essex Junction, Vermont.

At the age of 17, he enlisted in the United States Navy during World War II, and served aboard the destroyer escort USS Borum (DE-790) in Europe during the Normandy landings. At the age of 21, he enrolled as an English major at Middlebury College in Vermont under the G.I. Bill.

== Career ==
Frost spent much of his career in the Twin Cities, teaching at the University of Minnesota and serving as artistic director of the Chimera Theater in St. Paul. He had a small yet memorable role in the film adaptation of Slaughterhouse Five (1972), which was shot in the Minneapolis area.

Frost's Hollywood work in shows such as Twin Peaks and Matlock was essentially his second career, following his retirement from teaching and stage direction. He was aged 63 when his son Mark, co-creator of Twin Peaks with David Lynch, cast him in the role of Dr. Will Hayward. Frost appeared in thirty episodes of the series, and reprised the role in the feature film Twin Peaks: Fire Walk with Me although his scenes were cut. His appearance in Twin Peaks led to a recurring role in the legal drama Matlock.

In the Seinfeld TV series he played Henry Ross, father of Susan Ross, George Costanza's fiancée. His onscreen wife in Seinfeld was played by his Twin Peaks co-star Grace Zabriskie.

Frost returned to play Doc Hayward in the revived series of Twin Peaks, which began airing in May 2017.

== Personal life ==
Frost married Mary Virginia Calhoun in 1949 and was the father of novelist, television screenwriter, and producer Mark Frost, actress Lindsay Frost, and writer Scott Frost. He was the grandfather of baseball player Lucas Giolito and actor Casey Giolito. He also has a grandson from his oldest son Mark.

Frost died at his home in Middlebury, Vermont, on February 17, 2017, following a long illness at the age of 91.

== Filmography ==
=== Film ===
| Year | Title | Role | Notes |
|---|---|---|---|
| 1958 | War of the Colossal Beast | Operator (Switchboard) | |
| 1959 | The Mating Game | Secretary | Uncredited |
| 1959 | It Started with a Kiss | Lt. McCann | Uncredited |
| 1972 | Slaughterhouse-Five | Driver | Uncredited |
| 1992 | Twin Peaks: Fire Walk with Me | Dr. Will Hayward | |
| 1993 | Sister Act 2: Back in the Habit | Archdiocese Person #1 | |
| 2014 | Twin Peaks: The Missing Pieces | Dr. Will Hayward | |

=== Television ===
| Year | Title | Role | Notes |
|---|---|---|---|
| 1957 | Goodyear Television Playhouse | Gene Marley | Episode: "The Princess Back Home" |
| 1957 | Death Valley Days | John Chapman | Episode: "The Calico Dog" |
| 1957 | The Gray Ghost | Capt. Leonard Wood | Episode: "The Missing Colonel" |
| 1958 | Navy Log | Shugart | Episode: "The Butchers of Kapsan" |
| 1958 | The Silent Service | Capt. Edward H. Mikes | Episode: "The Story of the U.S.S. Aspro" |
| 1958 | Studio One | The Desk Clerk | Episode: "The Desperate Age" |
| 1958 | The Gale Storm Show | Jerry | Episode: "You Gotta Have Charm" |
| 1958 | The Danny Thomas Show | Man In Dream | Episode: "The Reunion" |
| 1958–1959 | Playhouse 90 | Various roles | 3 episodes |
| 1960 | Perry Mason | Infrared Camera Technician | Episode: "The Case of the Nimble Nephew" |
| 1988 | Tattingers | Albert Philcox | Episode: "Death and Taxis" |
| 1988–1989 | As the World Turns | Jarred Carpenter | 5 episodes |
| 1989 | Quantum Leap | US Senator | Episode: "Honeymoon Express" |
| 1989 | Beauty and the Beast | Paul Malloy | Episode: "Though Lovers Be Lost..." |
| 1989–1991 | Twin Peaks | Dr. Will Hayward | 30 episodes |
| 1990 | So Proudly We Hail | Horace Gabler | Television film |
| 1990 | Psycho IV: The Beginning | Dr. Leo Richmond | Television film |
| 1990 | L.A. Law | George Maltin | Episode: "New Kidney on the Block" |
| 1991 | False Arrest | | Television film |
| 1991 | Get a Life | Senator | Episode: "Health Inspector 2000" |
| 1991 | Civil Wars | Judge Lawrence Adelman | Episode: "Have Gun, Will Unravel" |
| 1991–1995 | Matlock | Billy Lewis | 18 episodes |
| 1992 | Intruders | Dr. Holman | 2 episodes |
| 1992 | Murphy Brown | Dave | Episode: "A Year to Remember" |
| 1992 | Life Goes On | Judge Harper | Episode: "Love Letters" |
| 1992–1998 | Seinfeld | Henry Ross | 5 episodes |
| 1994 | The Byrds of Paradise | Rex Palmer | 5 episodes |
| 1994 | The Stand | George Richardson | 2 episodes |
| 1994 | The Larry Sanders Show | Jerry Sanders | Episode: "Would You Do Me a Favor?" |
| 1995 | Grace Under Fire | Man at House | Episode: "No Money Down" |
| 1995 | Murder One | Judge Neil Platner | Episode: "Chapter Six" |
| 1996 | The John Larroquette Show | Professor Nolfi | Episode: "The Master Class" |
| 2017 | Twin Peaks | Doc Will Hayward | Episode: "Part 7" |
