= Oatmeal Crisp =

Breakfast cereal made by General Mills

- A bowl of Oatmeal Crisp
- Product type: Breakfast cereal
- Current owner: General Mills
- Country: Canada
- Introduced: 1988; 38 years ago
- Markets: United States, Canada
- Website: Oatmeal Crisp

Oatmeal Crisp is a breakfast cereal from General Mills primarily sold in Canada. It consists of flattened oatmeal flakes glazed with a sugary coating.

== Varieties ==
Oatmeal Crisp is currently available in 6 flavours:

- Oatmeal Crisp Almond
- Oatmeal Crisp Maple Nut
- Oatmeal Crisp Honey Crunch
- Oatmeal Crisp Triple Berry
- Oatmeal Crisp Protein Apple Crisp
- Oatmeal Crisp Protein Vanilla

=== Discontinued or limited edition ===
- Oatmeal Crisp Apple Crisp (Canada)
- Oatmeal Crisp Coconut (Canada)
- Oatmeal Crisp Crunchy Almond (USA)
- Oatmeal Crisp Hearty Raisin (USA)
- Oatmeal Crisp Raisin (Canada)
- Oatmeal Crisp Maple Brown Sugar (USA)
- Oatmeal Crisp Vanilla Almond (Canada)
