= Dann Cahn =

American film editor (1923–2012)

Coordinates: 34.145°N 118.320°W

- Born: Daniel Richard Cahn; April 9, 1923; Hollywood, California, U.S.
- Died: November 21, 2012 (aged 89); West Los Angeles, Los Angeles, California, U.S.
- Resting place: Forest Lawn Memorial Park
- Other name: Dann Cahn Sr.
- Occupation: Film editor
- Spouse(s): Judy Cahn (née Baker; 1953–2010; her death)
- Children: 2
- Parents: Philip Cahn (1894–1984); Gertrude Barsha (1897– 1964)

Daniel Richard "Dann" Cahn (April 9, 1923 – November 21, 2012) was an American film editor who received the Career Achievement Award from the American Cinema Editors (ACE). Cahn was best known as the head editor of the TV series, I Love Lucy and for his work as the head of post-production of Desilu Playhouse. Cahn would also go on to edit several more movies and TV series such as The Beverly Hillbillies. Cahn worked with Orson Welles, Russ Meyer and others.

== Early life ==
Cahn was born and raised in Hollywood. His parents were Philip and Gertrude (Barsha) Cahn. Some members of the Cahn family were already in the film business at the time Danny Cahn was born. His family (his grandparents and his father, a baby at the time) had migrated from Poland and Russia to Philadelphia, before settling in New York on the lower east side of Manhattan.

The Cahn family would later move to Hollywood, where his uncle Edward L. "Eddy" Cahn had managed to join the film business in 1913. Eddy Cahn worked first as a prop man and then later moved up to become one of the top film editors at Universal Studios.

Dann Cahn's father, Philip Cahn, tried ranching in North Hollywood on a 2-acre (0.81 ha) piece of property that he bought with proceeds he had saved and money earned from his wife Gertrude's dress shop ("Gertrude's" on Hollywood Boulevard). The ranch property was located at the junction of Vineland and Aqua Vista in North Hollywood next to the Los Angeles River. His father purchased 2,500 baby chicks. But one night the electricity gave out and the incubators went cold. The baby chicks didn't make it. Soon after, Philip Cahn would also join his brother in the film business as a film editor. Dann Cahn's father Philip edited Imitation of Life with Claudette Colbert.

With an uncle and father in the film business, young Danny Cahn grew up in Hollywood and would hang around his father's sets prior to World War II. Dann also got the itch to work on movies. Fascinated by the Dead End Kids pictures that were popular at the time and having acted in a few high school plays, young Danny Cahn thought he might like to become an actor. Cahn got his SAG card and worked on bit parts in several B-movies before deciding that most actors were starving and that he wanted a "real paying gig".

During World War II, Dann Cahn was among the hundreds of actors, directors, producers, writers, editors, cameramen, makeup artists and even musicians enlisted in the armed services who found themselves stationed not in the European front or the Pacific theater, but at the old Hal Roach Studios in Culver City. As members of the First Motion Picture Unit, these soldiers contributed to the war effort by making more than 400 training films and documentaries.

Of making films for the military, Cahn said, "I was an editor in the unit and two of us were sent to the Pentagon for a year and we made newsreels. We were all in for 3½ years, and most of us got a world of experience."

Cahn is the middle part of one of the only three-generation families in ACE editing history. His father, Philip Cahn, had a long career at Universal, mainly cutting Abbott and Costello comedies. His son, Danny Cahn Jr., ACE, is also picture editor on features and TV series, and was elected president of the Motion Picture Editor's Guild at the beginning of 2011.

== Career highlights ==
Dann Cahn started out working in a film library and then later moved up as an assistant editor on motion pictures. His first job in television came in 1949, the Lucky Strike Showtime. Most notably, Cahn worked at Desilu on the TV series, I Love Lucy. Cahn also edited The Untouchables, and The Loretta Young Show. Dann Cahn also worked at Glenn Larson Productions as head of post production.

I Love Lucy was the first sitcom to shoot with three cameras and ship in 35 mm instead of kinescopes. Cahn was one of the first editors to master cutting on a film Moviola with four heads (three for picture and one for sound). Cahn's work on I Love Lucy is featured in the Lucille Ball-Desi Arnaz Center in Jamestown, New York, which has an exhibit including his "three-headed monster" editing machine.

At Desilu Studios, Cahn mentored several I Love Lucy team members, editors Gary Freund and Ted Rich both started as his apprentices. His other apprentices included Bud Molin and a fourth, "the one I had to nurse the longest..." Cahn said, "that was Michael Kahn, ACE, and he is now the number one editor in town, doing all of Steven Spielberg's shows."

Cahn would go on to work with several notable feature film directors, including Orson Welles (Fountain of Youth) and the notorious Russ Meyer (Beyond the Valley of the Dolls). Cahn would also direct at least one episode of the classic TV series, Leave It to Beaver and would also produce and/or direct several other films or television shows.

== Personal life ==
In 1953, Cahn married former pro golfer Judy Cahn (1929–2010). They had two children. His son Daniel T. Cahn is also an editor. His daughter Dana died 1973 in a car accident.

Cahn's hobby was collecting exotic birds.

== Death ==
Cahn died of natural causes at his West Los Angeles home on November 21, 2012, at the age of 89. His remains were interred at Forest Lawn Memorial Park.

== Selected filmography ==
- I Love Lucy's 50th Anniversary Special (2001) (TV) (consultant)
- Yes Virginia, There Is a Santa Claus (1991) (TV)
- Jake Spanner, Private Eye (1989) (TV)
- Bates Motel (1987) (TV)
- My Sister Sam (1986) TV series
- Tough Enough (1983)
- Remington Steele (1982) TV series
- The Fall Guy (1981) TV series
- The Octagon (1980)
- Man from Atlantis (1977) TV series
- Shaft TV series (associate producer) (3 episodes, 1974)
- Police Woman (1974–1975) TV series
- The Most Deadly Game (1970) TV series
- Beyond the Valley of the Dolls (1970)
- The Beverly Hillbillies (28 episodes, 1963–1964)
- Leave It to Beaver (1 episode, 1961) Director
- The Lucy–Desi Comedy Hour (1959)
- Frances Langford Presents (1959) TV series (writer)
- Westinghouse Desilu Playhouse (1 episode, 1959) Director
- The Scarface Mob (1959) (TV) (second unit director)
- The Fountain of Youth (1958) (TV) (editorial supervisor)
- The Californians (1957) TV series (editorial supervisor)
- I Love Lucy (editorial supervisor) (106 episodes, 1952–1957)
- Cavalcade of America (2 episodes, 1956–1957)
- Make Room for Daddy (1953) TV series
- I Love Lucy film (1953)
- I Love Lucy (33 episodes, 1951–1952)
- Our Miss Brooks (1952) TV series
- Airborne Lifeboat (1945)
