= Robert Alan Browne =

American film and television actor

- Browne in Psycho II (1983)
- Born: June 2, 1932; New York City, U.S.
- Died: June 12, 2018 (aged 86); Laguna Woods, California, U.S.
- Occupations: Film and television actor
- Years active: 1965–1995
- Spouse(s): Lynne Barbara Smith (div. 1962) Marjorie Stapp (died. 2014)
- Children: 1

Robert Alan Browne (June 2, 1932 – June 12, 2018) was an American film and television actor He was best known for playing the café owner Ralph Statler in the films Psycho II and Psycho III. He also played Detective Stanley Bumford in the short-lived crime drama television series Heart of the City.

Browne guest-starred in television programs, including M*A*S*H, Simon & Simon, Dallas, Moonlighting and Three's a Crowd. Aside from acting, he worked as a hairdresser.

Browne died at his home in Laguna Woods, California on June 12, 2018, at the age of 86.
