= Hugh Gillin =

American film and television actor (1925–2004)

- Born: Hugh Clair Gillin Jr. July 14, 1925; Galesburg, Illinois, U.S.
- Died: May 4, 2004 (aged 78); San Diego, California, U.S.
- Education: Pittsburg High School, The University of Kansas
- Occupation: Actor
- Years active: 1972–1998
- Spouse: Mary Nettels (m. 1947)
- Children: 4

Hugh Clair Gillin Jr. (July 14, 1925 – May 4, 2004) was an American film and television actor. He was best known for playing Sheriff John Hunt in Psycho II and III. Gillin appeared in a total of 75 films and television shows. Gillin last appeared on television in 1998 where he was featured in Pensacola: Wings of Gold in the episode "Not in My Backyard". He was a member of AMPAS, The Academy of Motion Picture Arts and Sciences.

== Life and career ==
Hugh Clair Gillin Jr. was born in Galesburg, Illinois on July 14, 1925. He grew up in Pittsburg, Kansas and attended Pittsburg High School and The University of Kansas. He was a member of the Kansas Jayhawks basketball team in 1947. Gillin received the Purple Heart medal in World War II.

Gillin died in San Diego, California on May 4, 2004, at the age of 78.
