= Bates Motel (film) =

1987 made-for-television film directed by Richard Rothstein

- TV Guide advertisement, 1987
- Genre: Horror
- Based on: Characters by Robert Bloch
- Written by: Richard Rothstein
- Directed by: Richard Rothstein
- Starring: Bud Cort; Lori Petty; Moses Gunn; Gregg Henry; Jason Bateman; Kerrie Keane
- Music by: J. Peter Robinson
- Country of origin: United States
- Original language: English

Production
- Executive producer: Richard Rothstein
- Producers: George Linder; Ken Topolsky; Henry Kline
- Production locations: Burbank, California; Los Angeles
- Cinematography: Bill Butler
- Editors: Dann Cahn; Richard A. Freeman
- Running time: 95 minutes
- Production company: Universal Television

Original release
- Network: NBC
- Release: July 5, 1987

Bates Motel is a 1987 American made-for-television supernatural horror film and a spin-off of the Psycho franchise written and directed by Richard Rothstein, starring Bud Cort, Lori Petty, Moses Gunn, Gregg Henry, Jason Bateman, and Kerrie Keane. Outside of the 1998 remake, this is the only installment not to feature Anthony Perkins as Norman Bates as Kurt Paul portrays the character. The film premiered on July 5, 1987. It is a direct sequel to Psycho, ignoring the other sequels.

The film is about Alex West, a mentally disturbed youth who was admitted to an asylum after killing his abusive stepfather. There he befriends Norman and ends up inheriting the Bates Motel. It was originally produced as a pilot for a proposed TV series set in the Bates Motel, but it was not picked up by the network.

== Plot ==
Bates Motel ignores the existence of Psycho II and Psycho III (and would in turn be ignored by Psycho IV: The Beginning), with Norman Bates never being released from the mental institution to allow the events of those films. Alex West is a mentally disturbed youth who was admitted to the asylum nearly twenty years ago for killing his abusive stepfather. He became close friends with Norman Bates at the asylum.

Years later, Norman dies and Alex learns that he has inherited the Bates Motel. He travels to Norman's California hometown (renamed Fairville for this film; in the original film it was Fairvale) and with a little help from teenage runaway Willie and local handyman Henry Watson, Alex struggles to re-open the motel for business. Alex gets a loan to renovate the motel, but the project is plagued with rumors about the place being haunted by the ghost of Norman's mother, Mrs. Gloria Bates, and the discovery of her remains, as well as those of her late husband Jake, buried on the grounds of the motel. When recovering the remains of Mrs. Bates, the sheriff said that the body "was never found", which seems to conflict with the original Psycho, where Mrs. Bates' corpse is present in the basement where Norman is finally captured by Sam Loomis.

While renovating the motel, Alex sees Mrs. Bates in her bedroom window, and sees the corpse of her late husband Jake from the same window, supporting the idea that the property is haunted. After Alex tells Willie that he owes his first loan payment of $10,000 the day after the motel opens, Willie becomes suspicious and with the help of Henry reveals that the haunting was a prank and the ghost was the bank manager, Tom Fuller. Fuller had approved a loan with predatory terms with Alex and was trying to sabotage the motel by trying to scare him away. Tom is then forced to help Alex and the others by negotiating friendlier payment terms for the loan or face prison for fraud. The motel is soon finished with the renovation.

Meanwhile, not all ghost stories turn out to be hoaxes as Barbara Peters books a room in Alex's motel for the night, planning suicide because she was getting older, and had been through three divorces without children. Barbara meets a teenage girl, Sally, who invites Barbara to dance at an after prom party in the motel with her and her teenage friends, including Tony Scotti, though Barbara felt uncomfortable hanging with young kids. It is then revealed that Barbara's real name is also Sally, and that the teenage girl who took her own life 25 years ago is a ghost along with Tony, and other teens who also committed suicide. She tells “Barbara” that she has a life worth living for, then leaves with the rest of the group. “Barbara” leaves the motel the next day, planning to live her life to the fullest.

Alex looks at the screen telling viewers: "If you ever need a room, come on by. I can't say for sure what you'll find, but that is what makes the world go around".

== Cast ==
- Bud Cort as Alex West
- Lori Petty as Willie
- Moses Gunn as Henry Watson
- Gregg Henry as Tom Fuller
- Khrystyne Haje as Sally
- Jason Bateman as Tony Scotti
- Kerrie Keane as Barbara Peters
- Robert Picardo as Dr. Goodman
- Lee de Broux as Sheriff
- Kurt Paul as Norman Bates
- Martha Frumkin as Dr. Phillip
- Rick Lieberman as Architect
- Timothy Fall as Terry Miller
- Kelly Ames as Beth
- Peter Dobson as Billy Parks
- Paula Irvine as Rebecca
- Greg Finley as the Attorney
- Nat Bernstein as Salesman
- David Wakefield as Macho Chicken
- George 'Buck' Flower as The Vagrant
- Carmen Filpi as Buddy
- Gary Ballard as Pastor
- Andy Albin as Mr. Yokes
- Dolores Albin as Mrs. Fisher
- Robert Axelrod as Sheepskin Salesman
- Craig Richard Nelson as Funeral Director

== Production ==
Bates Motel was created as a pilot episode for an anthology TV series that would focus on Alex and the various people who would check into the titular motel. Bud Cort and Lori Petty were brought on to portray two of the central characters. The script was written by Richard Rothstein, who also served as producer and director.

== Release ==
Bates Motel premiered on NBC in the United States in July 1987. It was later released to home video; Universal released it twice to DVD, once as part of its Vault Series and again (alongside Psycho II, Psycho III and Psycho IV: The Beginning) as part of its "4-Movie Midnight Marathon Pack" , in 2013 and 2014, respectively.

== Reception ==
Bates Motel has received criticism for straying too far from the source material of its predecessors. Chris Coffel of Bloody Disgusting reviewed the film as part of a retrospective on the Psycho films, stating "Bates Motel is definitely not a good movie. Not in the slightest bit, however, I can’t deny that it wasn’t fascinating. I was very much entertained while watching this. I cannot understand how anyone came up with this movie or how anyone signed off on it."

== See also ==
- List of American films of 1987
- List of horror films of 1987
