= Kurt Paul =

American actor and stuntman

- Born: United States
- Occupations: Actor, stuntman

Kurt Paul is an American actor and stuntman.

He is perhaps best known for his work within the Psycho movie franchise, where he performed as a stunt double for Anthony Perkins in Psycho II and III, and played "Mother" in all of the scenes of Psycho III except when Perkins' face was visible at the end.

Paul has had guest roles as "Norman Baines" and "Norman Blates" in the television series Knight Rider and Sledge Hammer!, respectively. In the television movie Bates Motel, Paul played the role of Norman Bates. Paul appeared in Psycho IV: The Beginning, where he had a minor role as Raymond Linette.

== Partial filmography ==
- General Hospital (1978-1983) - Lt.Baines
- Skatetown, U.S.A. (1979)
- Psycho II (1983, stunts)
- The A-Team (1984) (TV) - Intern
- Knight Rider (1984) (TV) - Norman Baines
- Cagney & Lacey (1985) (TV)
- Sledge Hammer! (1986) (TV) - Norman Blates
- Psycho III (1986, stunts)
- Bates Motel (1987) (TV ) - Norman Bates
- The Ghost Writer (1990) - Paul Bearer (scenes deleted)
- Psycho IV: The Beginning (1990) (TV) - Raymond Linette
- Fugitive X: Innocent Target (1996) (TV) - Cab Driver
- Alien Species (1996) - Deputy Harlan Banks
- Warpath (2000)
- A Passion (2001) (TV) - Detective Garvin
- The Bike Squad (2002) - Sheriff
- Supernatural (2005) (TV) - Sheriff Tillam
- The Confessional (2009) - Mr. Jenson (final film role)
