= Alice Hirson =

American actress (1929–2025)

- Born: Alice Corinne Thorsell; March 10, 1929; New York City, U.S.
- Died: February 14, 2025 (aged 95); Los Angeles, California, U.S.
- Occupation: Actress
- Years active: 1951–2021
- Spouses: Roger O. Hirson (divorced); Stephen Elliott (m. 1980; died 2005)
- Children: 2

Alice Corinne Hirson (née Thorsell; March 10, 1929 – February 14, 2025) was an American actress best known for her roles on television. She began her career on stage, before roles on daytime soap operas. She was best known for her roles as Mavis Anderson in the CBS prime time soap opera Dallas and as Lois Morgan, the mother of the title character on the ABC sitcom Ellen.

== Background ==
Hirson was born Alice Corinne Thorsell in New York City on March 10, 1929, and was raised on Long Island. She graduated from the American Academy of Dramatic Arts in 1948.

In 1964, Hirson met actor Stephen Elliott. They were married from 1980 until Elliott's death in 2005. She was previously married to dramatist Roger O. Hirson, with whom she had two sons.

Hirson died at the Motion Picture & Television Country House and Hospital on February 14, 2025, at the age of 95.

== Career ==
Hirson began her career on off-Broadway stage, before roles in 1960s plays Traveller Without Luggage and The Investigation.

=== Television ===
Hirson began her television career appearing on the classic anthology series Hallmark Hall of Fame and Starlight Theatre. From 1969 to 1970, she was a regular cast member on the CBS daytime soap opera The Edge of Night, playing the role of Stephanie Martin. She played the role of Marcia Davis on Another World and its spin-off Somerset from 1970 to 1972. From 1972 to 1976, Hirson starred as Eileen Riley Siegel on ABC's One Life to Live. She also had a recurring role on General Hospital in 1982.

After leaving daytime television, Hirson began playing supporting roles on prime time. In 1977, she appeared in made-for-television movies The Death of Richie, Alexander: The Other Side of Dawn, and Having Babies II, and the following year co-starred opposite Cicely Tyson in A Woman Called Moses. Hirson also guest-starred on Maude, The Waltons, Family, Barnaby Jones, Flamingo Road, Barney Miller, Quincy, M.E., St. Elsewhere, Hotel, and Full House. From 1982 to 1988, Hirson played the recurring role of Mavis Anderson, friend and confidante of Miss Ellie Ewing (Barbara Bel Geddes) in the CBS prime time soap opera, Dallas.

In 1992, Hirson was a regular cast member on the short-lived NBC sitcom Home Fires starring Kate Burton. From 1994 to 1998, she played the role of Lois Morgan, the mother of Ellen DeGeneres' character on the ABC comedy series, Ellen. From 1996 to 2006, she appeared in eight episodes of The WB family drama series, 7th Heaven playing Jenny Jackson, mother of Annie Camden (Catherine Hicks), whose illness and death occurred as the series began in 1996. She also had recurring roles on Murphy Brown and The Secret Life of the American Teenager, and guest-starred on Law & Order, ER, NYPD Blue, Judging Amy, Just Shoot Me!, and Cold Case.

=== Film ===
Hirson made her film debut in the 1971 crime comedy The Gang That Couldn't Shoot Straight. In 1979, she appeared in the horror film Nightwing and played the First Lady of the United States in the comedy-drama Being There. She also appeared in Private Benjamin, Revenge of the Nerds, Mass Appeal, Blind Date, Bride of Boogedy, The Big Picture, The Glass House, and The Lost.

== Filmography ==
=== Film ===
Year	Title	Role	Notes
1971	The Gang That Couldn't Shoot Straight	The Mayor's Wife	
1979	Nightwing	Claire Franklin	
1979	Being There	First Lady	
1980	Private Benjamin	Mrs. Thornbush	
1984	Revenge of the Nerds	Mrs. Lowe	
1984	Mass Appeal	Mrs. Hart	
1987	Blind Date	Muriel Bedford	
1989	The Big Picture	Mrs. Chapman	
1993	Stepmonster	Shirley	
2001	The Glass House	Mrs. Morgan	
2006	The Lost	Mrs. Griffith	

=== Television ===
Year	Title	Role	Notes
1951	Starlight Theatre	Alice	Episode: "Miss Buell"
1952	Hallmark Hall of Fame	Lucy	Episode: "Anne Bradstreet, Puritan Poetess"
1968	N.Y.P.D.	The 2nd Nurse	Episode: "Encounter on a Rooftop"
1970	Another World	Marsha Davis	43 episodes
1972	Particular Men	Louisa Rayner	Television film
1972–1976	One Life to Live	Eileen Riley Siegel	59 episodes
1977	The Death of Richie	Mrs. Blair	Television film
1977	Maude	Ed's Wife	Episode: "Maude's Reunion"
1977	Alexander: The Other Side of Dawn	Judge White	Television film
1977	Having Babies II	Mimi	Television film
1977	The Waltons	Jane Stephens	2 episodes
1977–1983	Quincy, M.E.	Various roles	3 episodes
1978	Loose Change	Rosemary	Miniseries
1978	Family	Ruth Green	Episode: "Fear of Shadows"
1978	Kate Bliss and the Ticker Tape Kid	Beth Dozier	Television film
1978	Barnaby Jones	Emily Warren	Episode: "Nest of Scorpions"
1978	A Woman Called Moses	Miss Rodham	2 episodes
1979	The Ropers	Mrs. Eastham	Episode: "The Doris Letters"
1979	Paris	Mrs. Dalton	Episode: "Friends and Enemies"
1979	ABC Afterschool Special	Grace Harris	Episode: "A Special Guest"
1979	Julie Farr, M.D.	Emily	Episode: "Captive"
1980	If Things Were Different	Karen Evans	Television film
1980	When the Whistle Blows	Dottie Jenkins	4 episodes
1981	Flamingo Road	Mary Troy	Episode: "A Mother's Revenge"
1981	Taxi	Woman Customer	Episode: "On the Job: Part 1"
1981	Barney Miller	Dorothy St. Clair	Episode: "The Vests"
1982	The Rules of Marriage	Eva Hewlitt	Television film
1982	General Hospital	Mrs. Van Gelder	4 episodes
1982	Miss All-American Beauty	Marjorie Butterfield	Television film
1982–1988	Dallas	Mavis Anderson	26 episodes
1983	St. Elsewhere	Anne Overland	Episode: "Release"
1983	Sitcom	Betty Gooseberry	Television film
1985	Hotel	Helen Riley	Episode: "Skeletons"
1985	Slickers	Dear Clinton	Television film
1985	The 13 Ghosts of Scooby-Doo	Voice	13 episodes
1986	Foley Square	Mrs. Dobbs	Episode: "The Star"
1986	Crossings	Eleanor Roosevelt	Episode #1.2
1986	Matlock	Hazel	Episode: "Diary of a Perfect Murder"
1986	If Tomorrow Comes	Mrs. Stanhope	Episode #1.1
1986, 1987	The Magical World of Disney	Various roles	2 episodes
1987	Starman	Ida Schwartzman	Episode: "Barriers"
1987	Full House	Claire Tanner	3 episodes
1987, 1988	Houston Knights	Beverly / John's Wife	2 episodes
1990	Equal Justice	Mrs. Williams	Episode: "The Price of Justice"
1990	Psycho IV: The Beginning	Mother	Television film
1990, 1996	Murphy Brown	Bootsie Sherwood	3 episodes
1991	Dear John	Mrs. Morris	Episode: "Brothers"
1992	Home Fires	Grandma	12 episodes
1993	Law & Order	Jewel	Episode: "Right to Counsel"
1993	Loving	Dr. Lisa Helman	4 episodes
1994–1998	Ellen	Lois Morgan	28 episodes
1996–2006	7th Heaven	Jenny Jackson	8 episodes
1999	ER	Mrs. Anderson	Episode: "Last Rites"
2000	Godzilla: The Series	Peg Chapman (voice)	Episode: "Wedding Bells Blew"
2000–2002	Baby Blues	Mrs. Johnson (voice)	3 episodes
2001	NYPD Blue	Karen Redding	Episode: "In the Wind"
2001	Determination of Death	Edith	Television film
2001	Judging Amy	Alison Loomis	Episode: "Surprised by Gravity"
2003	Just Shoot Me!	Helen Korsh	Episode: "The Last Temptation of Elliot"
2008	Cold Case	Judy McShane	Episode: "Glory Days"
2008–2011	The Secret Life of the American Teenager	Mimsy	6 episodes
2010	Starstruck	Grandma Olson	Television film
2011	Men of a Certain Age	Connie	2 episodes
2019	Will & Grace	Justice Ginsburg	Episode: "Supreme Courtship"
2021	Trash Truck	Mrs. Perry (voice)	Episode: "Pranks"
