= Psycho III =

1986 film by Anthony Perkins

- Theatrical release poster
- Directed by: Anthony Perkins
- Written by: Charles Edward Pogue
- Based on: Characters created by Robert Bloch
- Produced by: Hilton A. Green
- Starring: Anthony Perkins; Diana Scarwid
- Cinematography: Bruce Surtees
- Edited by: David Blewitt
- Music by: Carter Burwell
- Production company: Universal Pictures
- Distributed by: Universal Pictures
- Release date: July 2, 1986
- Running time: 93 minutes
- Country: United States
- Language: English
- Budget: $8.4 million
- Box office: $14.4 million

Psycho III is a 1986 American slasher film, and the third film in the Psycho franchise. It stars Anthony Perkins, who also directs the film, reprising the role of Norman Bates. It co-stars Diana Scarwid, Jeff Fahey, and Roberta Maxwell. The screenplay is written by Charles Edward Pogue. The original electronic music score is composed and performed by Carter Burwell in one of his earliest projects. Psycho III is unrelated to Robert Bloch's third Psycho novel, Psycho House, which was not published until 1990.

The film takes place one month after the events of Psycho II where Norman Bates is still running the Bates Motel with the corpse of Emma Spool still sitting up in the house. Maureen Coyle, a suicidal nun, with whom Norman falls in love, comes to the motel along with a drifter named Duane Duke. Reporter Tracy Venable also tries to solve the mysterious disappearance of Mrs. Spool as someone begins another murder spree.

Released on July 2, 1986, Psycho III grossed $14.4 million at the U.S. box office on a budget of $8.4 million, becoming the lowest-grossing film in the series. Later in 1987, Perkins' performance in this third installment of the Psycho screen anthology would garner him a nomination for a Saturn Award for Best Actor, and the film itself would also be nominated for a Saturn Award for Best Horror Film at the 14th Saturn Awards. It received mixed reviews from critics and was followed by a television prequel, Psycho IV: The Beginning, which was released on Showtime in November 1990.

== Plot ==
In 1983, Norman Bates works at the Bates Motel and lives with the preserved corpse of Emma Spool, a waitress who told him she was his real mother after murdering several people. When Spool remains missing after a month, Norman's ex-boss, Ralph Statler, and local law enforcement grow concerned. Duane Duke, a sleazy musician desperate for money, is offered the job of assistant manager at the motel. Tracy Venable, a journalist from Los Angeles, is working on an article about serial killers being released from custody. Believing that Norman is killing again, Tracy appears at the diner, and attempts to talk with him. Norman opens up to her but is distracted when Maureen Coyle, a young, mentally unstable former nun, enters. Maureen resembles his former victim, Marion Crane, whom Norman killed twenty-two years earlier which resulted in his incarceration. Seeing the initials "M.C." on her suitcase, Norman panics and leaves the diner.

"Mother" enters Maureen's bathroom that night, intending to kill her, only to find that she attempted suicide by cutting her wrists. The shock of this causes Norman to reassert his personality while a delirious Maureen mistakes "Mother" holding a knife for the Virgin Mary holding a crucifix. Norman brings Maureen to a hospital and offers that she stay as long as she needs to. After she is released, they begin a romantic relationship. That night, Duke picks up a girl named Red at a bar, but after Red makes it clear that she wants more than a fling, Duke rejects her. Red tries calling a cab, but "Mother" shatters the phone booth door and stabs Red to death. The following day, tourists arrive at the motel, planning to watch a football game. Tracy searches Spool's apartment, discovering the motel's phone number written on a magazine cover.

Patsy Boyle, the motel's only sober guest, is murdered by "Mother" on the toilet. Norman finds her body and buries her in the motel's ice chest. The next morning, Sheriff John Hunt and Deputy Leo appear to investigate Patsy's disappearance. Tracy tells Maureen about Norman's past, causing Maureen to stay with Father Brian, who took care of her at the hospital. Norman discovers that Spool's corpse is gone, with a note in its place. At Duke's cabin, Duke attempts to blackmail Norman by threatening to turn him in to the police. Norman attacks Duke with an ashtray, finally subduing him with Duke's guitar. Norman drags Duke and Patsy's bodies to his car to dump them into the swamp behind the motel. Duke, still alive, attacks Norman, causing him to lose control of the car and sending them into the swamp. Norman narrowly avoids drowning and swims ashore while Duke drowns.

Tracy talks to Statler about Spool and discovers she was working at the diner before Statler purchased it from Harvey Leach. Tracy meets with Leach, a resident at an assisted living facility, and is informed that Spool was also institutionalized for murder. Maureen convinces herself that Norman is her true love and returns to the motel. They share a tender moment at the top of the staircase when "Mother" shouts furiously at Norman, startling him. He loses his grip on Maureen's hands, causing her to fall down the stairs and be pierced and killed by the arrow on a statue. Tracy enters the house and finds Maureen dead, then sees Norman dressed as "Mother" bearing a knife, but is unable to flee.

Tracy tries reasoning with Norman by explaining his family history. Spool was not Norman's mother; she was actually his mother's sister who was in love with Norman's father John. When he chose her sister over her, Spool snapped and killed him. She then kidnapped the child Norman, but was later institutionalized. Norman, in a rage, destroys Spool's corpse, severing Mother's control over him. Sheriff Hunt arrests Norman. Hunt tells Norman that he will probably be incarcerated for the rest of his life. Norman replies "But I'll be free, I'll finally be free". As Norman is driven off by the police, he caresses Spool's severed hand and smiles menacingly at the camera.

== Cast ==
- Anthony Perkins as Norman Bates
- Diana Scarwid as Maureen Coyle
- Jeff Fahey as Duane Duke
- Roberta Maxwell as Tracy Venable
- Hugh Gillin as Sheriff John Hunt
- Robert Alan Browne as Ralph Statler
- Gary Bayer as Father Brian
- Lee Garlington as Myrna
- Donovan Scott as Kyle
- Karen Hensel as Sister Catherine
- Jack Murdock as Lou
- Katt Shea as Patsy Boyle
- Juliette Cummins as Red
- Steve Guevara as Deputy Leo
- Hugo Stanger as Harvey Leach
- Diane Rodriguez as Nun

== Production ==
=== Filming ===
Principal photography of Psycho III took place between June 28, 1985, and September 10, 1985. Anthony Perkins, who took on the role of director for the first time, said he decided to direct the film due to his enjoyment of the script, which he found "fascinating". He commented: "I liked how wild the script was, and how tight it was at the same time. It's the perfect blend of the reasonable and the unreasonable. I've always been looking for a project to direct with which I have an affinity with the subject and characters. I felt this would be a good script for an unknowing director to take on because the scenes were so well written, they directed themselves."

== Music ==
Psycho III: Music from the Motion Picture

Soundtrack album by Carter Burwell
- Released: July 1986
- Genre: Soundtrack
- Length: 30:39
- Label: MCA Records
- Producer: Carter Burwell

Singles from Psycho III
- 1. "Scream of Love" Released: July 1986

All tracks are written by Carter Burwell, except where noted

Side one
No.	Title	Writer(s)	Length
1.	"Scream of Love (Theme Song From the Motion Picture Psycho III)"	Carter Burwell/David Sanborn/Stephen Bray	3:47
2.	"Maureen in the Desert"		1:56
3.	"Dirty Street"	Burwell/Stanton Miranda/Bray	3:37
4.	"Before and After Shower"		3:36
5.	"Warm as a Cry for Help"		2:20

Side two
No.	Title	Writer(s)	Length
6.	"Sisters/Catherine Mary"	Burwell/Miranda/Bray	4:13
7.	"Mother?"		2:45
8.	"Bad Boys and Body Bags"		3:53
9.	"Revenge of a Thankless Child"		2:47
10.	"Electroshock Waiting Room"		1:45

Carter Burwell was approached by Perkins to compose the score to the film, since Perkins had enjoyed Burwell's work on Blood Simple. Perkins stated that he wanted to take the score in a more contemporary direction than Jerry Goldsmith had for his more traditional score for Psycho II. Burwell flew to Los Angeles and recorded the score largely on a Synclavier electronic music station, augmented by women's and boys' choirs as well as percussion by Steve Forman.

After Universal suggested the film contain some pop songs so that the film could be marketable to the MTV Generation, Burwell composed and performed songs with colleagues Stanton Miranda and Steve Bray. After Universal claimed the songs weren't sufficiently bankable, Burwell attempted to create a song with Oingo Boingo frontman and then burgeoning film composer Danny Elfman, using sampled strings from Bernard Herrmann's score to the original Psycho. This idea was also rejected.

Universal finally agreed to let Burwell take a motif from the score he'd composed and develop it into an instrumental electronic pop song. The song, "Scream of Love"—co-written by jazz saxophonist David Sanborn—was released as a 7" single and a series of dance remixes were commissioned from Arthur Baker and featured on the 12" version. MCA also commissioned a music video for the song featuring Burwell, Perkins and a "Hitchcockian woman". Perkins introduced the video on MTV as a guest VJ on July 2, 1986. The rest of the songs composed by Burwell, Miranda and Bray were used as background music in the film, playing from car stereos and jukeboxes.

Burwell's score was sampled by the hip hop group Insane Poetry on "Welcome to the Grim Side", the intro to their 1992 debut album Grim Reality, as well as on the title track of British musician Aim's 1999 electronica album, Cold Water Music.

== Release ==
=== Home media ===
Psycho III has been released four times on DVD. The initial release came in 1999 when Universal Studios leased the film out to GoodTimes Home Video. The second release came in 2005 from Universal Studios itself. The third release came in 2007 as part of a triple feature package with Psycho II and Psycho IV: The Beginning. Shout Factory released a special edition on DVD and Blu-ray in September 2013.

== Reception ==
=== Box office ===
Psycho III was originally scheduled to be released on February 14, 1986, on Valentine's Day. When the film opened on July 2, 1986, it earned $3.2 million in its opening weekend and went on to gross $14.4 million at the domestic box office, becoming the lowest-grossing theatrical film of the Psycho series.

=== Critical response ===
The film holds a 60% approval rating based on 35 reviews on the review aggregator Rotten Tomatoes, with an average rating of 5.5/10. The site's consensus states: "While it can't come close to the original's elemental horror, Psycho III makes a persuasive -- and blackly funny -- case for itself as a sequel".

Reviews from critics were mixed. Vincent Canby of The New York Times wrote a generally positive review, calling Perkins a "very creditable director" and Charles Edward Pogue's screenplay "efficient", concluding that "Psycho III expresses its appreciation of the Hitchcock legacy without seeming to rip it off". Variety wrote that the film "has its moments—about 20 minutes' worth—but the rest is filler in which the filmmakers gamely but futilely try to breathe new life into a tired body". Michael Wilmington of the Los Angeles Times thought that the film was "better in most respects than II", but "it fails any sequel's acid test. It feeds off the original without deepening it". He added that "if the movie proves anything, it's that everyone should give Hitchcock a rest". Paul Attanasio of The Washington Post called it "a playful, artfully made horror movie" made "really fun" by "Perkins and Pogue's morbid humor, the way they've captured the Hitchcock spirit and made it their own". Tom Milne of The Monthly Film Bulletin wrote that Perkins gave "an excellent performance" but "there isn't very much more to be said about Norman Bates".

Gene Siskel and Roger Ebert were split on the film's effectiveness. On their television show At the Movies, Ebert gave the film a "thumbs up" positive appraisal, saying it was a "much better movie than Part II", and adding, "in his first directing effort, Perkins shows that he knows Norman better than anyone else". Siskel, however, gave the film a "thumbs down" negative rating, reasoning that he was "turned off by some of the violence" and that the film "just sort of lay there".

Audiences polled by CinemaScore gave the film an average grade of "B−" on an A+ to F scale.

== Sequel ==
A sequel titled Psycho IV: The Beginning, was released in 1990.
