= Timothy O. Johnson =

American-Canadian film producer (born 1965)

- Born: March 17, 1975 (age 51)
- Education: Marshall School of Business
- Occupation: Film producer
- Website: johnsonproductiongroup.com

Timothy O. Johnson also known as Tim Johnson (born March 17, 1975) is an American-Canadian film producer and the founder of Johnson Production Group. He was the executive producer of Dr. Quinn, Medicine Woman, an American Western drama television series.

In 2025, upon acquisition of Johnson Production Group into Studio TF1, Johnson became CEO and Managing Partner of the new Studio TF1 America, a Canadian film and television production and distribution firm.

== Education ==
Johnson graduated from the Marshall School of Business at the University of Southern California.

== Career ==
Johnson started his career as a producer working with Barney Rosenzweig. He served as a research intern at Fox Broadcasting Company where he produced independent features and works. Johnson produced Dr. Quinn, Medicine Woman, a CBS hit series starring Jane Seymour. He produced Girl in Room 13, A Snow Capped Christmas and several other TV series and TV movies.

Johnson worked with Pax Television where he served as West Coast Head of Programming and Production. There he developed the series, Doc, starring Billy Ray Cyrus. He also produced The Noel Diary, starring Justin Hartley. Johnson later founded Johnson Production Group, LLC through which he has continued to produce series of movies annually.

In July 2025, Johnson Production Group was merged with Studio TF1 and Reel One Entertainment to create Studio TF1 America. Johnson thereafter became the CEO and Managing Partner of the new organization, which is a Canadian production and distribution company for television and film, owned by TF1.

== Filmography ==
Tim Johnson has been credited with numerous film productions.

=== Selected Productions ===
Year	Production
1993 - 1997	Dr. Quinn, Medicine Woman (TV series)
1997	Cold Case (TV series)
1999	Hope Island (TV series)
2000	The Sullivan Sisters (TV series)
2001	Doc (TV series)
2002	Wildfire 7 (TV movie)
2003	Mermaids (TV movie)
2004	The Days (TV series)
2006	A Daughter's Conviction (TV movie)
2007	Devil's Diary (TV movie)
2008	Lost Behind Bars (TV movie)
2009	Held Hostage (TV movie)
2010	Confined (TV movie)
2011	Holiday Engagement (TV movie)
2012	A Bride for Christmas (TV movie)
2013	Dirty Teacher (TV movie)
2014	Sugar Daddies (TV movie)
2014-2015	Strange Empire (TV series)
2015	Family for Christmas (TV movie)
2016	A Snow Capped Christmas (TV movie)
2017	Woman on the Run (TV movie)
2018	Deadly Runway (TV movie)
2019	A Bride's Revenge (TV movie)
2020	A Welcome Home Christmas (TV movie)
2021	Warming up to you (TV movie)
2022	Girl in Room 13 (2022 film) (TV movie)
2022	The 12 Days of Christmas Eve (TV movie)
2022	Road Trip Romance (TV movie)
2022	The Noel Diary (TV movie)
2022	The Holiday Sitter (TV movie)
2023	Love in the Maldives (TV movie)
2023	Love in Zion National: A National Park Romance (TV movie)
2023	The Dog Lover’s Guide to Dating (TV movie)

== See also ==
- Dr. Quinn, Medicine Woman
- Girl in Room 13 (2022 film)
- A Snow Capped Christmas
