= Anne Heche =

American actress (1969–2022)

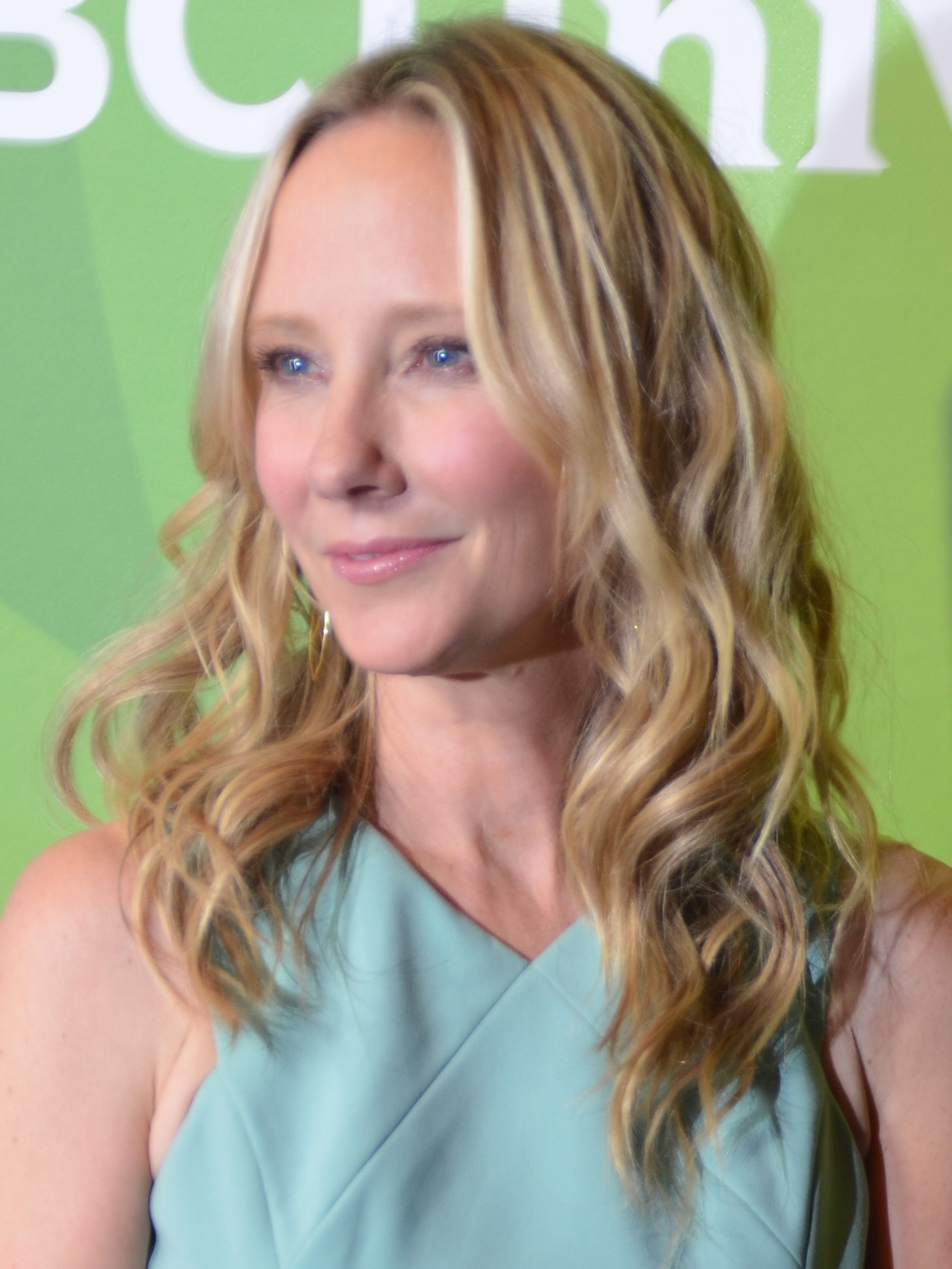
- Heche in 2014
- Born: Anne Celeste Heche; May 25, 1969; Aurora, Ohio, U.S.
- Died: August 11, 2022 (aged 53) (Note: Heche was declared brain dead on August 11, 2022, and thus legally deceased at that time under California law. However, she was kept on life support until August 14 to keep her heart beating until organ donor recipients could be found. As a result, there were conflicting media reports, with some news outlets reporting her death on August 12, while others waited until August 14.); Los Angeles, California, U.S.
- Resting place: Hollywood Forever Cemetery
- Occupation: Actress
- Years active: 1987–2022
- Spouse: Coleman "Coley" Laffoon (m. 2001; div. 2009)
- Partners: Ellen DeGeneres (1997–2000); James Tupper (2007–2018)
- Children: 2
- Mother: Nancy Heche
- Relatives: Susan Bergman (sister); Elliot Bergman (nephew); Natalie Bergman (niece)

Anne Celeste Heche (/heɪtʃ/ HAYTCH; May 25, 1969 – August 11, 2022) was an American actress, known for her roles across a variety of genres in film, television, and theater. She was the recipient of Daytime Emmy, National Board of Review, and GLAAD Media Awards, in addition to nominations for a Tony Award and a Primetime Emmy.

Heche began her professional acting career on the NBC soap opera Another World (1987–1991), earning a Daytime Emmy Award for her portrayal of twins Vicky Hudson and Marley Love. She made her film debut in 1993 with a small role in The Adventures of Huck Finn. Heche's profile rose in 1997 with appearances in Donnie Brasco, Volcano, I Know What You Did Last Summer, and Wag the Dog. In 1998, she had starring roles in the romantic adventure Six Days, Seven Nights, the drama-thriller Return to Paradise and Psycho.

From 1999 to 2001, Heche focused on directing, most notably a segment of the HBO television film If These Walls Could Talk 2 (2000). She was nominated for a Tony Award for her starring role in the 2004 Broadway revival of Twentieth Century, as well as a Primetime Emmy Award that same year for her appearance in the television film Gracie's Choice. Other film appearances included Prozac Nation (2001), John Q. (2002), Birth (2004), Spread (2009), Cedar Rapids (2011), Catfight (2016), and My Friend Dahmer (2017). Heche also starred on a number of television series, such as The WB's Everwood (2004–2005), ABC's Men in Trees (2006–2008), and NBC's The Brave (2017–2018). In 2020, she appeared as a contestant on the 29th season of Dancing with the Stars, finishing in 13th place.

Events in Heche's personal life often upstaged her acting career. She was in a high-profile relationship with comedian Ellen DeGeneres between 1997 and 2000, with the pair being described by The Advocate as "the first gay supercouple". Immediately following her split from DeGeneres, she suffered a highly publicized psychotic break. In 2001, Heche published a memoir titled Call Me Crazy, in which she alleged extensive sexual abuse by her father.

On August 5, 2022, Heche was critically injured in a high-speed car crash. She died from the injuries six days later at a Los Angeles hospital at the age of 53.

== Early life ==
Anne Celeste Heche was born on May 25, 1969, in Aurora, Ohio, the youngest of five children of Donald "Don" Joe Heche and Nancy Heche (née Prickett). During her early childhood, the Heche family lived in various towns around Ohio, including suburbs of Cleveland and Akron. Heche's parents were fundamentalist Christians and the family was raised in a deeply religious environment, a situation that she later likened to being "raised in a cult". At the same time, her father led an unstable lifestyle, often changing professions and prone to frequent get-rich-quick schemes, though also with a real gift for music that led to jobs as a choir director in several churches. Heche noted in her memoir that her family changed denominations several times depending on which church her father found work in.

Because of Don Heche's often unstable lifestyle and financial situation, the family moved numerous times during her childhood. One of his financial schemes led the family to resettle in the Atlantic City, New Jersey, area in 1977, first in Ventnor City and later Ocean City. One of Anne's first jobs was at a boardwalk hamburger stand, where she would sing songs from Annie to attract customers.

The Heche family's precarious financial situation led to the foreclosure of a home her father owned and later their eviction from a rental home. They moved in with a family from their church who offered them a place to live as an act of charity. Anne's mother separated from her father and demanded he leave the household. Her mother and all of the children then took jobs to support the family and be able to live on their own. Anne found work at a dinner theater in Swainton, her first professional acting job, earning $100 a week (about $300 per week in 2022 dollars).

Don Heche moved to New York City, where Anne and her sisters would occasionally visit him, noticing his declining health. He claimed it was cancer, when in fact he had developed late-stage AIDS. Although he lived as a gay man in New York, Don kept his sexuality and the nature of his illness from his family. They did not know about his diagnosis and had not even heard of AIDS until coming across an article on the disease in The New York Times about a month before his death. Don died from AIDS-related complications on March 3, 1983, aged 45. In a 1998 interview, Anne reflected that her father being closeted ultimately "destroyed his happiness and our family. But it did teach me to tell the truth. Nothing else is worth anything."

Three months after her father's death, Anne's 18-year-old brother Nathan was killed in a car crash when he lost control of his vehicle and struck a tree. The remainder of her immediate family subsequently moved to Chicago to be closer to other family members. Anne, her mother and her older sister Abigail, who had left college, were all living together in a one-bedroom apartment, which lacked privacy and which Anne would compare to living in a dorm room.

Heche attended the progressive Francis W. Parker School, where she continued to be active in theater, performing in such plays as Thornton Wilder's The Skin of Our Teeth and Irwin Shaw's Bury the Dead. When she was aged 16, a talent scout spotted her in a school play and invited her to audition for the daytime soap opera As the World Turns. Heche flew to New York with her mother, auditioned, and was offered a part. She was not able to accept the offer, as it would have entailed moving with her family to New York in the middle of her school year and having her mother leave a new job at a brokerage firm. In her memoir, Heche notes that she really wanted to move out on her own and "escape [her] mother's grasp", but this was not an option while she was still a minor.

In 1987, at the end of her senior year, Heche was offered another audition, this time for the soap opera Another World. She was offered a role after two auditions and accepted, in spite of her mother's opposition. She moved to New York City and started work on the series, in her debut television role, just days after her high school graduation. In a later interview she stated, "I did my time with my mom in a one-bedroom, skanky apartment and I was done."

== Career ==
=== 1987–1996: Early television and film roles ===
Heche performed on Another World in the dual role of twins Vicky Hudson and Marley Love. She continued on the series for nearly four years, from 1987 to 1991. She received several awards for her work on Another World, including a Daytime Emmy Award for Outstanding Younger Actress in a Drama Series in 1991.

Heche was unsure about her future as an actress after leaving Another World, having not performed in any other onscreen roles during her time on the soap opera and not having any acting jobs in place at the time she decided to leave. She knew that she did not want to continue in soap operas, something that was considered fairly insignificant in the larger world of professional acting. As a backup plan, she applied to and received an offer of acceptance from Parsons School of Design in New York City. However, right after applying to design school, she was offered a small supporting role in the Hallmark Hall of Fame television film adaptation of the Willa Cather novel O Pioneers!, featuring Jessica Lange. Heche decided to take that offer rather than attend design school and to continue with her career as an actress.

Heche received news of her Daytime Emmy Award for Another World while in Nebraska filming O Pioneers!. "Does this mean I'm an actress?" was her response in a telephone call with her agent following the news. The agent suggested that she relocate from New York City to Los Angeles, which she did days after shooting was completed on the film. O Pioneers! would air in February 1992 and was Heche's first TV movie. Her performance garnered some positive critical notice. After completing O Pioneers!, Heche starred in a guest appearance in an episode of Murphy Brown. Though this episode was shot after O Pioneers!, it aired in November 1991 and hence was her primetime television debut and her first screen appearance outside of Another World. After her Murphy Brown appearance, however, she felt that guest spots on television episodes would be detrimental to her long-term career success and mostly avoided TV guest spots until the 2000s.

Heche also starred in several roles in Los Angeles theater productions in 1991 and 1992, including "Us & Them", a Generation X slice-of-life piece, and Getting Away With Murder, a stage adaptation of the James M. Cain stories Dead Man and The Baby in the Icebox, which were produced as part of the Mark Taper Forum–sponsored "Sundays at the Itchey Foot" series. In early 1993, Heche made her theatrical film debut in the little-seen independent film An Ambush of Ghosts, directed by Everett Lewis. Soon afterward, she appeared in the Disney film The Adventures of Huck Finn with Elijah Wood. Over the next two years, she performed mainly bit parts in feature films such as A Simple Twist of Fate (1994) and larger supporting roles in cable television movies such as Girls in Prison (1994) and Kingfish: A Story of Huey P. Long (1995).

Heche appeared in her first lead role (albeit receiving third billing) in Donald Cammell's straight-to-video erotic thriller Wild Side (1995), alongside Christopher Walken and Joan Chen. The film gained some notoriety for its inclusion of a very strong lesbian sex scene between Heche and Chen. In 1996, Heche had the starring role as a college student contemplating an abortion in a segment of the HBO anthology film If These Walls Could Talk, co-starring Jada Pinkett Smith and Cher. Also that year, she appeared opposite Catherine Keener portraying childhood best friends in the independent film Walking and Talking. The limited-release film garnered favorable reviews from critics and is number 47 on Entertainment Weekly's "Top 50 Cult Films of All-Time" list. Heche gained positive notice from film critic Alison Macor of The Austin Chronicle, who wrote that she "is destined for larger film roles".

=== 1997–1999: Career breakthrough ===
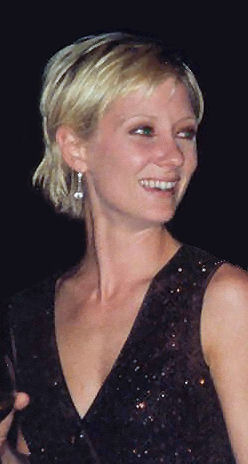
Heche at the Primetime Emmy Awards in 1997

In 1997, Heche starred in what has been described as her breakthrough role in the hit crime drama Donnie Brasco as the wife of the main character, an FBI undercover agent played by Johnny Depp. Critic Janet Maslin of The New York Times wrote that Heche "does well with what could have been [a] thankless role".

By the late 1990s, Heche continued to find recognition and commercial success as she took on supporting roles in three other 1997 high-profile film releases—Volcano, I Know What You Did Last Summer and Wag the Dog. The disaster film Volcano, about the formation of a volcano in Los Angeles, had her star with Tommy Lee Jones and Gaby Hoffmann, playing a seismologist. While critical response towards the film was mixed, it grossed US$122 million at the international box office. Heche portrayed the minor role of a backwoods loner in the slasher thriller sleeper hit I Know What You Did Last Summer, starring Jennifer Love Hewitt, Sarah Michelle Gellar, Ryan Phillippe, and Freddie Prinze Jr. Despite her limited screen time in the film, Heche was considered a "standout" by some reviewers, such as Derek Eller of Variety. She obtained the part of a presidential advisor opposite Robert De Niro and Dustin Hoffman in the political satire Wag the Dog, a role that was originally written for a man. Budgeted at US$15 million, the film made US$64 million. She received the National Board of Review Award for Best Supporting Actress in 1997 for her roles in Donnie Brasco and Wag the Dog.

Heche's first lead role in a major film came in the 1998 romantic adventure Six Days, Seven Nights, where she appeared opposite Harrison Ford, portraying a New York City journalist who ends up with a pilot (Ford) on a deserted island following a crash landing. She had been cast in the film one day before her same-sex relationship with Ellen DeGeneres went public. Although she was cast in a second starring role shortly thereafter as Vince Vaughn's love interest in the drama Return to Paradise (1998), Heche felt that her relationship with DeGeneres destroyed her prospects as a leading woman. According to Heche, "People said, 'You're not getting a job because you're gay'." She commented: "How could that destroy my career? I still can't wrap my head around it." Six Days, Seven Nights received mixed reviews, but grossed US$74.3 million in North America and US$164.8 million worldwide. On her appearance in the dramatic thriller Return to Paradise, a writer for The New York Times remarked, "as Ms. Heche's formidable Beth Eastern does her best to manipulate the other characters on [costar Joaquin Phoenix's character] behalf, Return to Paradise takes on the abstract weightiness of an ethical debate rather than the visceral urgency of a thriller."

Heche starred in Gus Van Sant's Psycho (1998), a remake of the 1960 film directed by Alfred Hitchcock. In the updated version, she took on the role originally played by Janet Leigh as Marion Crane, an embezzler who arrives at an old motel run by serial killer Norman Bates (played by Vince Vaughn in their second collaboration). Psycho earned negative reviews, and despite a US$60 million budget it made US$37.1 million worldwide. In an otherwise negative Times review of the film, Janet Maslin felt that Heche was "refreshingly cast in Marion's role", while noting that her portrayal was "almost as demure as Ms. Leigh's, yet she's also more headstrong and flirty." Heche's 1998 films were the only theatrically released films in which she had a leading role. She also starred opposite Ed Harris in the 1999 film, The Third Miracle, directed by Agnieszka Holland.

=== 1998–2001: Directing projects ===
Heche spent much of the 1998 to 2001 working on film directing projects, often writing her own screenplays. She pulled back from acting roles during this period and had relatively few acting appearances from 1999 to 2001. Her first effort at writing and directing was a 1998 short film titled Stripping for Jesus, which was about an evangelical Christian stripper who writes Bible verses on her body so as to reach clients "in a language that they understand". According to Heche, the film was a metaphor for "my life as I saw it". The film was fully self-financed. Heche starred in the film along with Suzanne Krull and Karen Black.

Heche's next several films were made for cable television and featured then-partner Ellen DeGeneres in varying degrees of participation. The first of these (and the one with the widest release) came in 2000, when Heche directed a segment of If These Walls Could Talk 2 for HBO. An anthology film, it consisted of a series of segments about lesbian life in individual years over several decades. In Heche's segment, "2000", DeGeneres and Sharon Stone starred as a contemporary lesbian couple trying to have a baby together via artificial insemination. DeGeneres was also one of the executive producers of the film. In 2001, Heche directed another anthology film segment, this time part of On the Edge, a Showtime anthology of science fiction stories directed by different actresses. Heche's segment, titled Reaching Normal, was her screenplay adaptation of the short story Command Performance by Walter M. Miller Jr. The segment features Andie MacDowell and Paul Rudd in the story of a housewife who enters into a telepathic extramarital affair; the segment includes a cameo appearance by DeGeneres.

Heche also directed a documentary that was to be released in 2001, Ellen DeGeneres: American Summer, about DeGeneres' 2000 stand-up comedy tour. The project was never completed. DeGeneres, who financed the documentary, states that she "burned" the film after attempting to salvage the project following the couple's split, but that the memories that it brought back were too painful.

=== 2000–2009: Independent films, TV and Broadway ===
Most of Heche's roles in the early 2000s were in independent films and television; she played the role of Dr. Sterling in the film adaptation of Elizabeth Wurtzel's autobiography about depression, Prozac Nation, with Christina Ricci and Jessica Lange. Premiered at the 2001 Toronto International Film Festival, the film received a DVD release in 2005. She appeared as a hospital administrator in the thriller John Q., about a father and husband (Denzel Washington) whose son is diagnosed with an enlarged heart. The production made US$102.2 million at the worldwide box office, despite negative reviews by critics. In 2001, Heche obtained a recurring role in the fourth season of the television series Ally McBeal.

In 2002, Heche made her Broadway debut in a production of the Pulitzer Prize-winning drama Proof, in the role of a young woman who has inherited her father's mathematical genius and mental illness. The New York Times found Heche to be "consequential" in her portrayal and compared her to Mary-Louise Parker and Jennifer Jason Leigh, who had previously played the character: "Though Ms. Heche, whose stage experience is limited and who is making her New York stage debut at 33, plays the part with a more appeasing ear and more conventional timing, her take on the character is equally viable. Her Catherine is a case of arrested development, impatient, aggressively indignant, impulsive". In 2004, Heche received a Primetime Emmy Award nomination for Best Supporting Actress for her performance in the Lifetime movie Gracie's Choice, as well as a Saturn Award nomination for Best Actress for her performance in the CBS television film The Dead Will Tell. In the same year, she performed on Broadway opposite Alec Baldwin in revival of the play Twentieth Century, about a successful and egomaniacal Broadway director (Baldwin), who has transformed a chorus girl (Heche) into a leading lady. For her performance, she was nominated for the 2004 Tony Award for Best Actress in a Play.

Also in 2004, Heche appeared alongside Nicole Kidman and Cameron Bright in the well-received independent drama Birth. She took on the recurring role on The WB drama Everwood during its 2004–05 season, and then a recurring role on Nip/Tuck as an ex-mob wife and Witness Protection Program subject who requires plastic surgery. Heche continued her television work with Hallmark Hall of Fame Christmas film Silver Bells (2005) and in the Lifetime television film Fatal Desire (2006), about an ex-cop, played by Eric Roberts, who meets a woman on an online dating site who attempts to get him to kill her husband.

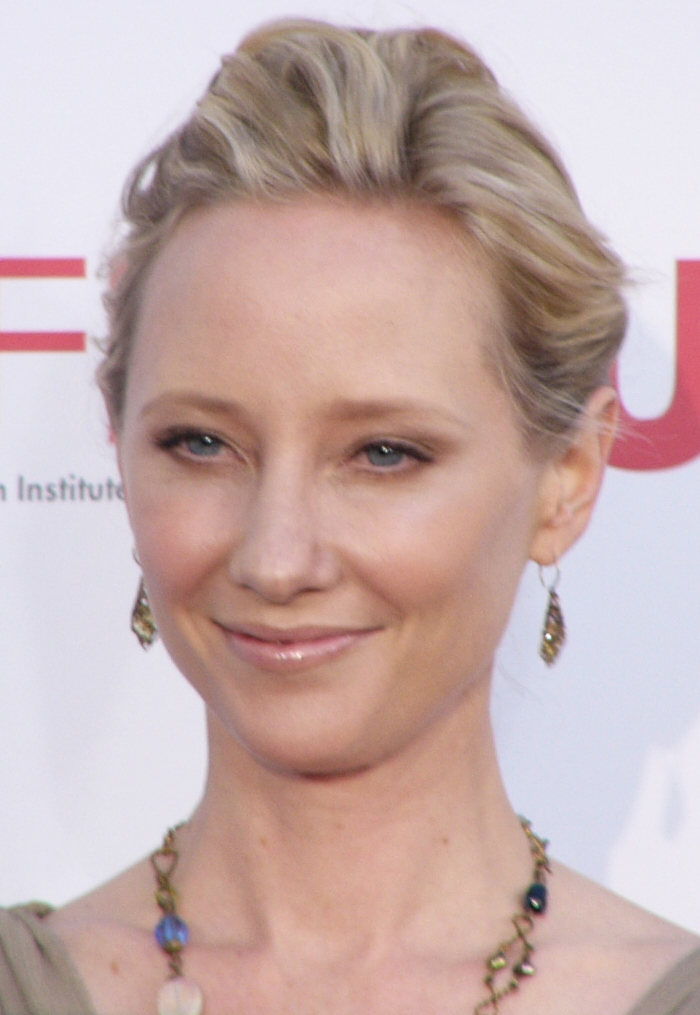
Heche in June 2007

Heche appeared in the small-scale dramedy Sexual Life (2005), chronicling modern romantic life and co-starring Azura Skye and Elizabeth Banks. The film was screened on the film festival circuit and received a television premiere. In 2006 she began work on her own series, Men in Trees, in which she played a New York author who, after finding out her fiancé is cheating on her, moves to a small town in Alaska which happens to be abundant with single men and few women. Men in Trees was canceled in May 2008, after a season shortened by the writer's strike. During the airing of the show, Heche starred in the romantic comedy What Love Is (2007) and in Toxic Skies (2008), a science-fiction thriller based on the chemtrails conspiracy theory.

Heche appeared as the girlfriend of a narcissistic gigolo in the sex comedy Spread (2009), co-starring Ashton Kutcher. The film received a limited release in North American theaters while it made US$12 million at the worldwide box office. Matthew Turney of View London felt that "[t]here's also terrific support" from Heche in what he described as an "enjoyable, sharply written and beautifully shot LA drama". Also in 2009, she was cast in the HBO dramedy series Hung, in a supporting role as the ex-wife of a financially struggling high school coach-turned-male prostitute, portrayed by Thomas Jane. The series received favorable reviews and aired until 2011.

=== 2010–2022: Later acting career ===
Heche's cameo appearance as the CEO of an important company in the well-received comedy The Other Guys (2010), starring Will Ferrell and Mark Wahlberg, was followed by a much larger role in the independent comedy Cedar Rapids (2011), where she portrayed a seductive insurance agent with whom a naive and idealistic man (played by Ed Helms) becomes smitten. The Sundance-premiered production garnered critical praise and was an arthouse success. David Rooney of The Hollywood Reporter remarked in his review for the film, "while Heche shines brightest in more brittle mode, as in HBO's Hung, she strikes a sweet balance between Joan's mischievous and maternal sides".

In the drama Rampart (2011), Heche starred with Woody Harrelson and Cynthia Nixon, as one of the two former wives of a corrupt police officer (Harrelson), who also happen to be sisters. The film had a selected theatrical run following its premiere at the 36th Toronto International Film Festival, and garnered an overall positive response; The San Francisco Chronicle, remarked that Heche and her other female co-stars, "allow Harrelson to shine – he has always had a way of preening for women – and he brings out the best in them". She also starred in Lifetime film Girl Fight (2011), alongside Jodelle Ferland and James Tupper. Heche then had the leading role in the comedy That's What She Said (2012), which premiered at the Sundance Film Festival, followed by the role of the girlfriend of a former pro golfer (Colin Firth) in Arthur Newman (also 2012).

Heche starred with James Tupper, Jennifer Stone, and Rebekah Brandes in the supernatural horror film Nothing Left to Fear (2013), about a family's life in a new town being interrupted by an unstable man of the cloth. The film received a release for video-on-demand and selected theaters. It was panned by critics, and the Los Angeles Times remarked that both Heche and Tupper "should write apology notes to their fans". Also in 2013, Heche headlined the short-lived NBC sitcom Save Me, in which she starred as a Midwestern housewife who believes that she is channeling God. She played the waitress friend of a recovering gambling addict (Jason Statham) in the action thriller Wild Card (2014). Distributed for a VOD and limited release in certain parts of North America only, the film only grossed US$6.7 million internationally on a $30 million budget. Heche also had a recurring guest-role on The Michael J. Fox Show before its cancellation. In 2013, she signed a first look deal with Universal Television.

USA Network's action-adventure drama series, Dig, had Heche portray the head of the FBI field office in Jerusalem whose agents uncover a 2,000-year-old conspiracy while investigating an archaeologist's murder. The six-episode series premiered in late 2014. The following year, Heche guest-starred in the ABC thriller series Quantico playing the role of criminal profiler, Dr. Susan Langdon. On September 27, 2016, she starred in the post-apocalyptic action drama Aftermath, which debuted on Canada's Space network and on United States' Syfy. Heche played Karen Copeland, a United States Air Force pilot who must navigate Armageddon, with her university-professor husband Josh (James Tupper) and their three nearly adult children. Neither Dig nor Aftermath was renewed for a second season.

Heche filmed the supporting part as the lead singer for a Broadway musical in Opening Night (2016) with Topher Grace. The musical comedy was screened at the Los Angeles Film Festival. In another independent film, the comedy Catfight (2016), Heche starred opposite Sandra Oh, portraying one of two bitter rivals who pursue a grudge match that spans a lifetime. Like Heche's previous projects, the film premiered on the film-festival circuit and received a VOD and limited release, to largely favorable reviews from critics. The Los Angeles Times wrote: "Oh and Heche are great here, giving performances entirely lacking in vanity and self-consciousness. They aren't afraid to get ugly, both in their treatment of everyone around them as well as in their post-brawl bruises, which makes them that much funnier."

In 2017, Heche played a supporting role in My Friend Dahmer as Joyce, the mentally ill mother of the teenaged Jeffrey Dahmer (Ross Lynch). She received positive reviews for her performance, with The Hollywood Reporter calling her "nerve-jangling perfection" and Empire calling her "entertainingly off-kilter".

On September 25, 2017, Heche debuted as the series lead playing DIA Deputy Director Patricia Campbell in the military/espionage thriller The Brave, which lasted for one season on NBC. In 2018, she joined the television series Chicago P.D. in a supporting role. In 2019 she received praise for her portrayal as the wife of KKK Klavern leader C.P. Ellis in the acclaimed Best of Enemies, based on a true story about school desegregation in Durham, NC, in 1971.

In late 2020, Heche competed as one of the celebrities in the 29th season of Dancing with the Stars, but was eliminated from the contest after the fourth week. The following year, she co-starred in an ensemble cast in Lindsay Gossling's 13 Minutes about four families struggling with multiple dilemmas in a fictional Oklahoma town just before a devastating tornado hits.

At the time of her death in August 2022, Heche had completed filming several films that were still in post-production and where she would appear posthumously. One of these films was Girl in Room 13 that aired as part of Lifetime's "Ripped from the Headlines" film series. The movie is about human trafficking and was dedicated in memory of Heche. Wildfire: The Legend of the Cherokee Ghost Horse is slated to be the final screen performance for Heche, which is a family-appeal film based on the song "Wildfire" by Michael Martin Murphey. She also appeared with Alec Baldwin in the disaster action film Supercell, released on March 17, 2023.

== Other media ==
In 2001, Heche published a memoir titled Call Me Crazy, which discussed her family and career background, as well as disclosed her history of mental illness and alleged childhood sexual abuse by her father. In 2021, on her Better Together podcast, she said that she was working on a second memoir tentatively titled Call Me Sane. In September 2022, the second memoir, now titled Call Me Anne, was submitted in manuscript form shortly before her death and was announced for a January 2023 publication.

Heche also narrated several audiobooks, notably, a self-narrated audiobook of Call Me Crazy, as well as narrating audiobook versions of Stephen King's The Girl Who Loved Tom Gordon (1999) and Tess Gerritsen's Vanish (2005; co-narrated by Ilyana Kadushin). In 2017, Heche hosted a weekly radio show on SiriusXM with Jason Ellis entitled Love and Heche. In late 2020, Heche and Heather Duffy Boylston launched a podcast titled Better Together.

== Personal life ==
=== Family ===
Heche's mother, Nancy Heche, has been a Christian therapist since 1997, and since 2005 has focused on "overcoming homosexuality", frequently speaking at events sponsored by evangelical Christian and Christian right groups, notably the ex-gay ministry Love Won Out.

Heche had four older siblings, three of whom predeceased her. The eldest, Susan Bergman (1957–2006), died of a brain tumor. Bergman was a university lecturer in literature and a Christian writer, whose 1994 memoir titled Anonymity described their closeted gay father and the effects that his legacy had on the rest of the family. Another sister, Cynthia, died of a heart defect at two months. Heche's only brother, Nathan (1965–1983), died in a car crash at age 18, three months after the death of their father. Heche said his death was a suicide, though her mother and surviving siblings dispute this. Abigail is the fourth sibling, followed by Anne.

Heche was estranged from the surviving members of her family for many years. A rift with her mother began when she first disclosed her relationship with Ellen DeGeneres. The rift deepened when she alleged sexual abuse by her father in Call Me Crazy, creating a rift with her two sisters as well. Heche said she had been estranged from her mother since she confronted her about the sexual abuse. Heche's mother said it was Anne who cut off communication.

In her 2001 memoir, Heche wrote that her mother was in denial about the alleged sexual abuse. For example, when she contracted genital herpes as an infant, her mother insisted that it was a diaper rash and refused to take her to a doctor. Heche also wrote that her father repeatedly raped her from the time she was an infant until she was 12. When she was asked, "But why would a gay man rape a girl?" in a 2001 interview with The Advocate, Heche replied, "I don't think he was just a gay man. I think he was sexually deviant. My belief was that my father was gay and he had to cover that up. I think he was sexually abusive. The more he couldn't be who he was, the more that came out of him in [the] ways that it did."

Heche's mother has denied her daughter's allegations and responded in a discussion of the book on an internet forum: "I am trying to find a place for myself in this writing, a place where I as Anne's mother do not feel violated or scandalized. I find no place among the lies and blasphemies in the pages of this book." Anne's sister Abigail added,

It is my opinion that my sister Anne truly believes, at this moment, what she has asserted about our father's past behavior; however, at the same time, I would like to point out that Anne, in the past, has expressed doubts herself about the accuracy of such memories. Based on my experience and her own expressed doubts, I believe that her memories regarding our father are untrue. And I can state emphatically, regardless of Anne's beliefs, that the assertion that our mother knew about such behavior is absolutely false.

In 2009, Heche told The New York Times:

My mother had a very tragic life. Three of her five children are dead, and her husband is dead. That she is attempting to change gay people into straight people is, in my opinion, a way to keep the pain of the truth out. People wonder why I am so forthcoming with the truths that have happened in my life, and it's because the lies that I have been surrounded with and the denial that I was raised in, for better or worse, bore a child of truth and love. My mother preaches to this day the opposite of that core of my life. It is no mistake that she still stands up against love. And one wonders why I'm not rushing to have her meet my children.

In 2011, Heche told The Daily Telegraph that she had reconciled with her remaining sister Abigail, but doubted she would be able to repair her relationship with her mother.

Elliot Bergman and Natalie Bergman, of the band Wild Belle, are Heche's nephew and niece. In 2017, she said that their album Dreamland was her favorite album and described herself as a "proud aunt".

=== Relationships ===
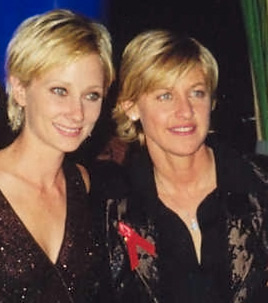
Heche with Ellen DeGeneres in September 1997

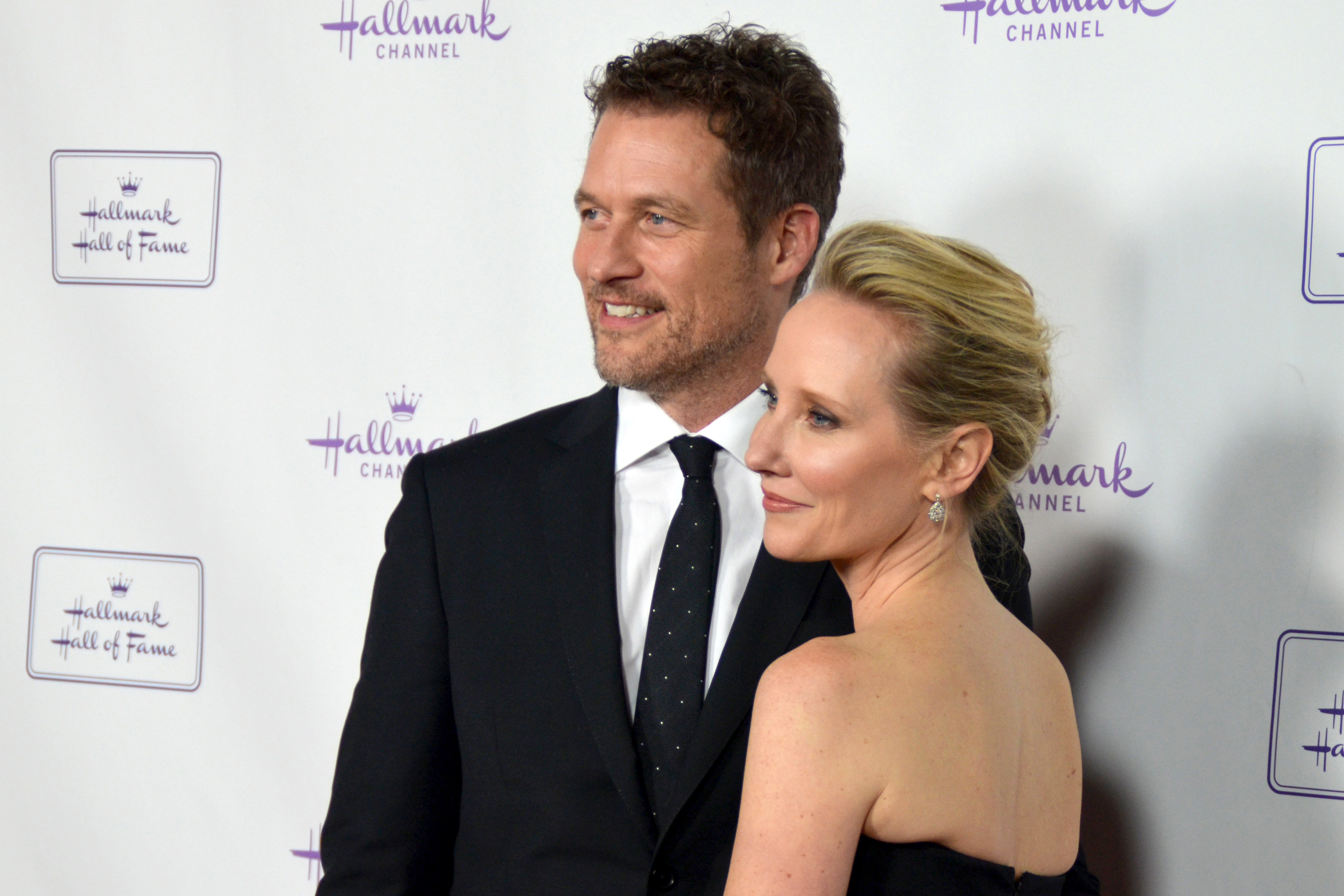
Heche with James Tupper in November 2014

Heche was in a relationship with Lindsey Buckingham of Fleetwood Mac for about one year in the early 1990s and also in a relationship with Steve Martin, whom she had met on the set of A Simple Twist of Fate, for about two years during the mid-1990s.

Heche's relationship with DeGeneres and the events following their breakup became subjects of widespread media interest. They were described as "the world's first gay supercouple". Heche and DeGeneres started dating in 1997, and at one point said they would get a civil union if such became legal in Vermont. They broke up in August 2000. Heche stated that all of her other romantic relationships were with men. In the memoir Call Me Anne, submitted shortly before her death, she wrote that she never identified as a lesbian and did not regard the terms "gay" or "straight" as relevant to her.

Heche claims that there was professional fallout due to her relationship with DeGeneres. She recounts that she was warned not to attend the 1997 premiere of Volcano with DeGeneres, and when the couple did so anyway, they were escorted out before the film had ended. Heche said that she was told that she would be denied the part in Six Days, Seven Nights for going public with her romance with DeGeneres, but landed the role nevertheless. However, Heche did not work in a studio picture for 10 years afterward. In a later podcast, Heche claimed that DeGeneres tried to put her in an institution and that she was effectively blacklisted from DeGeneres' talk show, which negatively affected her career as studios were reluctant to hire her for films they would be unable to publicize on the widely viewed program.

In 2000, Heche left DeGeneres for Coleman "Coley" Laffoon, a cameraman whom she met when she hired him as part of the camera crew for the television documentary Ellen DeGeneres: American Summer, which she was directing. On September 1, 2001, she and Laffoon married. They had a son, Homer Heche Laffoon, in March 2002. Laffoon filed for divorce in February 2007, after five and a half years of marriage. In a separate court filing, he said that Heche "exhibited bizarre and delusional behavior for which she refuses to seek professional help." The divorce was finalized in March 2009.

Heche left Laffoon for Men in Trees co-star James Tupper. During their relationship, Heche described herself and Tupper as being "eternally engaged". She and Tupper had a son, Atlas Heche Tupper, in March 2009. Tupper and Heche separated in January 2018.

Heche and former Hung co-star Thomas Jane announced that they were in a relationship in 2019; they were together into 2020, but had separated by the time of her death.

=== Mental health problems ===
In her memoir Call Me Crazy, Heche discusses her struggles with mental health issues and the long-term effect of her childhood abuse. She wrote that she had blocked out much of her childhood and had first gone into therapy during her time on Another World, undergoing various types of therapy through the mid-1990s. Heche soon began Reichian body psychotherapy, and wrote that the release of body memories through this technique helped her recover memories of her alleged sexual abuse and confront the emotional aftermath of childhood trauma. This process was later continued through guided LSD therapy, which she claimed had led to a full recovery of childhood memories.

Heche underwent another crisis that began about the time she had finished filming Donnie Brasco, in which she said that she began hearing God speaking directly to her. In this state, she said that she was told that she had an inner being called "Celestia" who was an incarnation of God and the Second Coming of Jesus. She believed that it was her mission to enlighten humanity and that she had achieved fame in order to fulfill this role. Heche's initial experience of hearing and being directed by what she claimed was God lasted for twelve days, and her spiritual experiences and alter ego as Celestia continued for another four years. During this time, Heche claimed to have had experiences with glossolalia, automatic writing and drawing, clairvoyance, the ability to psychically heal others and having stigmata appear on her feet.

On August 19, 2000, immediately following her separation from DeGeneres, Heche drove on Interstate 5 from Los Angeles to the San Joaquin Valley. Exiting where she later said she "had been told" to go, she ended up in Cantua Creek, a rural area in western Fresno County, California. Heche left her vehicle at the side of a rural road and, wearing only a bra and shorts, walked 1.5 miles (2.4 km) in extremely hot weather without water, before feeling dehydrated and knocking on the door of a ranch house. The homeowner recognized Heche from Six Days, Seven Nights and was astonished that a celebrity would show up at her "in the middle of nowhere" location. (Note: Key sources give varied details of this incident. The People magazine story includes an interview with a Fresno technical college student who was alone at her family home when she encountered Heche. In Heche's own account in Call Me Crazy, she says that she encountered a rural farm family who spoke little English. The accounts differ in several other key details as well.)

After the homeowner let Heche in and gave her a glass of water, Heche took off her shoes and asked to take a shower, which the homeowner permitted. She assumed Heche was not under the influence of alcohol or drugs, but Heche later revealed to officers that she had taken ecstasy. After taking a shower, Heche entered the living room, asked for a pair of slippers, and suggested they watch a movie. Unsure of what to do after Heche had been at the house for half an hour without contacting anyone, the homeowner contacted the Fresno County Sheriff's Department. Heche later told the deputies that she was "God, and was going to take everyone back to heaven…in a spaceship." She was then taken to Fresno's University Medical Center by ambulance and was admitted to its psychiatric unit, but was released within a few hours. The unit's personnel described the incident as a psychotic break.

Heche stated that she was insane for the first 31 years of her life, and that her insanity was triggered by the sexual abuse that her father subjected her to during her childhood. In a series of nationally televised interviews to promote Call Me Crazy in September 2001, she stated that she created a fantasy world called the "Fourth Dimension" and the alter ego "Celestia" to make herself feel safe. Heche said she recovered from her mental health concerns following the incident in Cantua Creek and had put her alter ego behind her.

=== Allegations against Harvey Weinstein ===
In a January 2018 interview on the podcast Allegedly with Theo Von and Matthew Cole Weiss, Heche alleged that Harvey Weinstein had exposed himself to her and demanded oral sex, and claimed to have been fired from an unspecified Miramax film in retaliation after she refused Weinstein's advances. She said that there were many other incidents of sexual harassment that took place during her career and stated that her survival of childhood sexual abuse had given her the strength to stand up to unwanted advances such as those made by Weinstein. A spokesman for Weinstein said that he had been "friendly" with Heche, but denied all of her allegations.

== Car crash and death ==
On August 5, 2022, Heche caused a sequence of three motor vehicle collisions in the Mar Vista neighborhood of Los Angeles, the final collision being the most serious, with Heche inflicting critical injuries on herself, minor injuries to someone else, and destroying a house.

The first collision occurred when Heche's vehicle struck an apartment garage, resulting in minor property damage. A video released by TMZ shows her vehicle, a Mini Clubman, at the scene of the collision and an unidentified man repeatedly shouting, "Out of the car!" at the driver. Heche then reversed the vehicle and left the scene of the collision. She was identified as the driver in the photo later released by TMZ. (Note: Attributed to multiple references:)

TMZ also reported a second hit-and-run in which Heche struck a Jaguar with her Mini without stopping, though without injury to the other driver. An accompanying video shows Heche speeding down an alleyway and nearly hitting a pedestrian. A doorbell video recorded in the moments before the final crash shows Heche driving along a neighborhood street at a very high speed, followed a few seconds later by the sound of a crash.

In the final crash, Heche struck a house with her vehicle, broke through a wall and embedded the vehicle 30 feet (9.1 m) into the building, trapping Heche inside. The vehicle caught fire, which rapidly spread through the entire building. The resulting house fire took 65 minutes to be fully extinguished and required 59 firefighters. (Note: Attributed to multiple references:) Firefighters were unable to access and fully extricate Heche from the vehicle for 45 minutes after their arrival on the scene, and initially were not aware that a person was trapped in the vehicle. Heche had sustained severe burns and smoke inhalation injuries by the time she was rescued. The house was left structurally compromised and uninhabitable. The tenant of the house was in the rear of the structure at the time of the collision and sustained only minor injuries. Her attorney said that she and her pets "almost lost their lives" and that she had lost all of her personal property in the fire.

Law enforcement officials initially stated that Heche was "deemed to be under the influence and acting erratically" at the time of the crashes. The Los Angeles Police Department said that a preliminary blood analysis showed the presence of both cocaine and narcotics, including fentanyl, in her system; however, the coroner's report concluded that she was not impaired at the time of the crash.

=== Hospitalization ===
As Heche was being removed from the crash scene, she was filmed sitting up on the stretcher and struggling with firefighters while she was being wheeled into the ambulance but lost consciousness soon afterward. Heche was taken to Ronald Reagan UCLA Medical Center for emergency care, and then to Grossman Burn Center at West Hills Hospital for specialized burn center care. On August 8, a representative for Heche said that she was in a coma in critical condition, requiring medical ventilation for pulmonary injury sustained in the crash. The representative also said that prior reports that Heche was in "stable condition" were "inaccurate".

On August 11, the representative said that Heche was not expected to survive an anoxic brain injury she had sustained, but that she was being kept on life support to determine if her organs were viable for donation, in accordance with her expressed wish to be an organ donor. Heche was declared brain dead a few hours later, but remained on life support to assess organ donor viability and locate recipients. (Note: Attributed to multiple references:) Heche was considered legally dead at that time under California law.

Police had investigated the crash as a felony DUI collision but said there would be no more investigative efforts after Heche was declared brain dead.

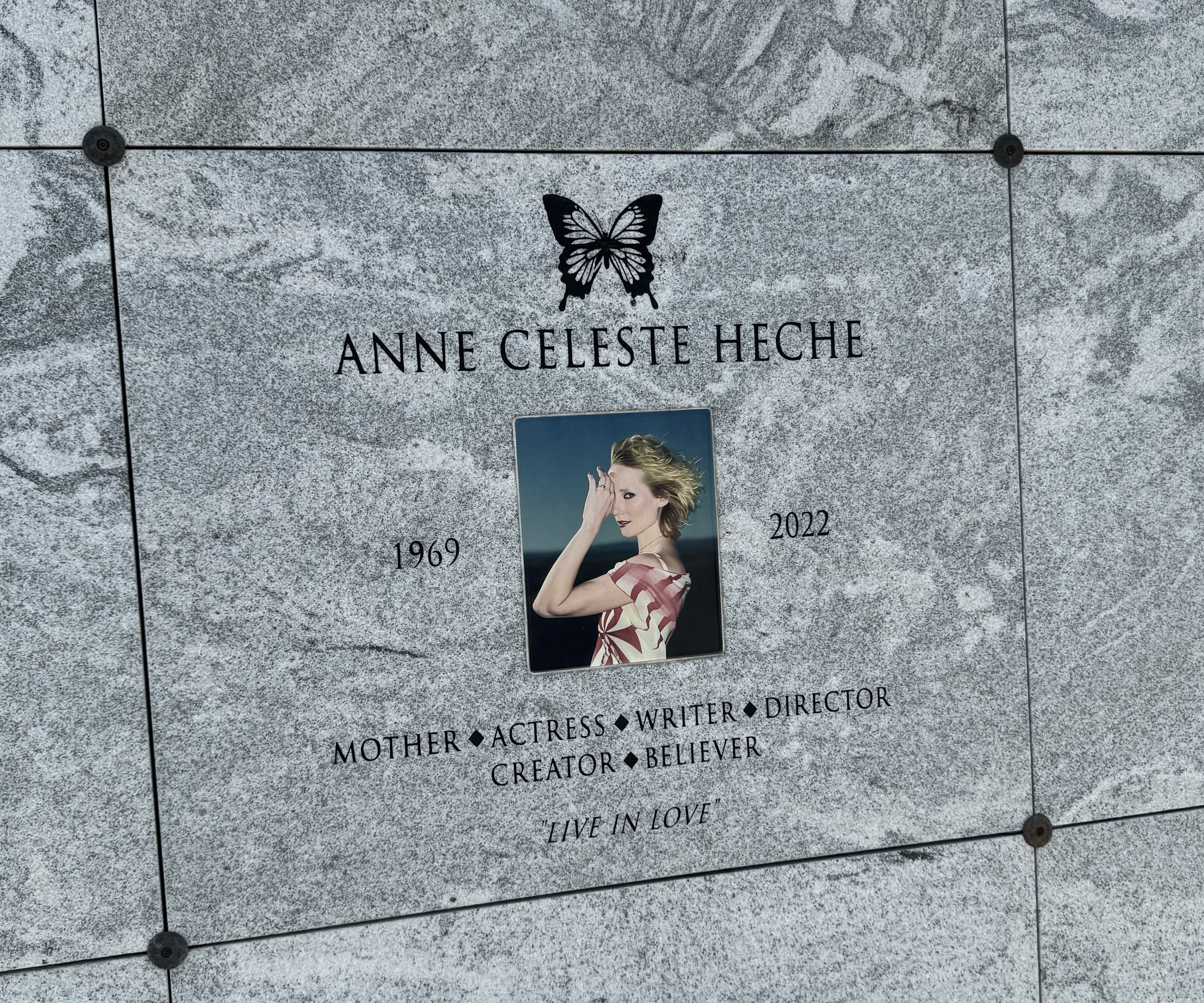
Crypt of Anne Heche at Hollywood Forever Cemetery

On August 14, it was announced that organ recipients had been found and that her body would undergo the organ donation procedure that day. To honor her organ donation, hospital staff held an honor walk for Heche. That evening, her publicist announced that she had been "peacefully taken off life support." The office of the Los Angeles County Medical Examiner-Coroner recorded the cause of death as "inhalation and thermal injuries", with "sternal fracture due to blunt trauma" listed as an "other significant condition", and ruled her death an accident. (Note: Attributed to multiple references:)

On December 6, 2022, the Los Angeles County Department of Medical Examiner-Coroner announced the results of Heche's autopsy, stating that she was not impaired by illicit substances at the time of the incident and that no active drugs were found in her system. An inactive metabolite of cocaine was found through a blood test taken when Heche arrived at the hospital, which the coroner's office said indicates the drug was used in the past, but not at the time of the crash. Cannabinoids were detected in Heche's urine but not in the blood test, which was consistent with prior use, but not during the time of the incident. Fentanyl was also detected in Heche's system, but it was determined that it was from treatment she received at the hospital.

Heche's cremated remains were interred in a mausoleum at Hollywood Forever Cemetery on May 14, 2023.

=== Estate ===
On August 31, 2022, Heche's older son Homer Heche Laffoon filed a petition in the Los Angeles County probate court claiming that Heche had died intestate, asking that he be named her estate's administrator. Laffoon's lawyer also stated that they wished to have a third party appointed guardian ad litem for Heche's younger son (and Laffoon's half-brother), Atlas Heche Tupper.

On September 15, Heche's former boyfriend, James Tupper, filed a petition raising objections to Laffoon's. He argued that an email sent by Heche in 2011 describing her wishes in the event of her death should be treated as her will. Tupper's petition challenged Laffoon's qualifications to administer the estate, claiming that at 20 years of age he lacked the maturity required of an administrator, and that Laffoon's lack of personal assets and income would render him unable to post the required bond. Tupper concluded that he wished to act as executor and hire a professional fiduciary to manage the estate.

Lynne Mishele, the tenant of the house into which Heche crashed, filed lawsuits against Heche's estate seeking damages of $2 million.

In November 2022, the court appointed Homer Heche Laffoon as general administrator of his mother's estate. In early 2024, Laffoon stated that the estate could not pay its debt of over $6 million, including the $2 million in damages sought by Mishele.

== Filmography ==
=== Film ===
Year	Title	Role	Director(s)	Notes	Ref.
1993	An Ambush of Ghosts	Denise	Everett Lewis		
1993	The Adventures of Huck Finn	Mary Jane Wilks	Stephen Sommers		
1994	I'll Do Anything	Claire	James L. Brooks		
1994	A Simple Twist of Fate	Tanny's Playmate	Gillies MacKinnon		
1994	Milk Money	Betty	Richard Benjamin		
1995	Wild Side	Alex Lee	Donald Cammell		
1996	The Juror	Juliet	Brian Gibson		
1996	Pie in the Sky	Amy	Bryan Gordon		
1996	Walking and Talking	Laura	Nicole Holofcener		
1997	Donnie Brasco	Maggie Pistone	Mike Newell		
1997	Volcano	Dr. Amy Barnes	Mick Jackson		
1997	I Know What You Did Last Summer	Melissa "Missy" Egan	Jim Gillespie		
1997	Wag the Dog	Winifred Ames	Barry Levinson		
1998	Six Days, Seven Nights	Robin Monroe	Ivan Reitman		
1998	Return to Paradise	Beth McBride	Joseph Ruben		
1998	Psycho	Marion Crane	Gus Van Sant		
1999	The Third Miracle	Roxane	Agnieszka Holland		
2000	Auggie Rose	Lucy Brown	Matthew Tabak	Also known as Beyond Suspicion	
2001	Prozac Nation	Dr. Sterling	Erik Skjoldbjærg		
2002	John Q.	Rebecca Payne	Nick Cassavetes		
2004	Birth	Clara	Jonathan Glazer		
2005	Sexual Life	Gwen	Ken Kwapis		
2007	Suffering Man's Charity	Helen Jacobsen	Alan Cumming	Also known as Ghost Writer	
2007	What Love Is	Laura	Mars Callahan		
2007	Superman: Doomsday	Lois Lane	Bruce Timm, Lauren Montgomery & Brandon Vietti	Voice role	
2008	Toxic Skies	Dr. Tess Martin	Andrew C. Erin	Also known as Containment	
2009	Spread	Samantha	David Mackenzie		
2010	The Other Guys	Pamela Boardman	Adam McKay	Uncredited	
2011	Cedar Rapids	Joan Ostrowski-Fox	Miguel Arteta		
2011	Rampart	Catherine	Oren Moverman		
2012	That's What She Said	Dee Dee	Carrie Preston		
2012	Black November	Barbra	Jeta Amata		
2012	Arthur Newman	Mina Crawley	Dante Ariola		
2013	Nothing Left to Fear	Wendy	Anthony Leonardi III		
2014	Wild Card	Roxy	Simon West		
2016	Opening Night	Brooke	Isaac Rentz		
2016	Catfight	Ashley	Onur Tukel		
2017	My Friend Dahmer	Joyce Dahmer	Marc Meyers		
2017	Armed Response	Riley	John Stockwell		
2017	The Last Word	Elizabeth	Mark Pellington		
2019	The Best of Enemies	Mary Ellis	Robin Bissell		
2020	The Vanished	Wendy Michaelson	Peter Facinelli		
2021	13 Minutes	Tammy	Lindsay Gossling		
2022	What Remains	Maureen Silverton	Nathan Scoggins	Posthumous release	
2023	Frankie Meets Jack	Katrina	Andrew Lawrence	Posthumous release	
2023	Supercell	Quinn Brody	Herbert James Winterstern	Posthumous release	
2023	You're Killing Me	Astrid Schroder	Beth Hanna & Jerren Lauder	Posthumous release	
2024	Wildfire: The Legend of the Cherokee Ghost Horse	Diana Jones	Eric Parkinson	Posthumous release	
TBA	Chasing Nightmares	Claire	Chris McGowan	Post-production; posthumous release; final film role	

=== Television ===
Year	Title	Role(s)	Notes	Ref.
1987–1991	Another World	Vicky Hudson / Marley Love	Regular role	
1991	Murphy Brown	Nica	1 episode	
1992	O Pioneers!	Marie	Television film	
1993	The Young Indiana Jones Chronicles	Kate	Episode: "Young Indiana Jones and the Scandal of 1920"	
1994	Against the Wall	Sharon	Television film	
1994	Girls in Prison	Jennifer	Television film	
1995	Kingfish: A Story of Huey P. Long	Aileen Dumont	Television film	
1996	If These Walls Could Talk	Christine Cullen	Television film; segment: "1996"	
1997	Subway Stories	Pregnant Girl	Television film; segment: "Manhattan Miracle"	
1998	Ellen	Karen	1 episode	
1999	One Kill	Capt. Mary Jane O'Malley	Television film	
2001	Ally McBeal	Melanie West	Recurring role, 7 episodes	
2004	Gracie's Choice	Rowena Lawson	Television film	
2004–2005	Everwood	Amanda Hayes	Main role (season 3)	
2005	Nip/Tuck	Nicole Morretti	3 episodes	
2005	Silver Bells	Catherine O'Mara	Television film	
2005–2006	Higglytown Heroes	Gloria the Waitress	Voice role; 3 episodes	
2006	Fatal Desire	Tanya Sullivan	Television film	
2007	Masters of Science Fiction	Martha Van Vogel	1 episode	
2006–2008	Men in Trees	Marin Frist	Main role	
2009–2011	Hung	Jessica Haxon	Main role	
2011	Girl Fight	Melissa	Television film	
2011	Silent Witness	Kate Robb	Television film	
2013	Save Me	Beth Harper	Main role	
2013–2014	The Michael J. Fox Show	Susan Rodriguez-Jones	4 episodes	
2013, 2015	Adventure Time	Cherry Cream Soda	Voice role; 2 episodes	
2014	One Christmas Eve	Nell Blakemore	Television film	
2014	The Legend of Korra	Suyin Beifong	Recurring voice role (seasons 3–4)	
2015	Dig	Lynn Monahan	Miniseries	
2015	Quantico	Dr. Susan Langdon	2 episodes	
2016	Aftermath	Karen Copeland	Main role	
2016	Looks Like Christmas	Carol Montgomery	Television film	
2017–2018	The Brave	DIA Dep. Director Patricia Campbell	Main role	
2018–2019	Chicago P.D.	Dep. Superintendent Katherine Brennan	Recurring role (season 6); guest role (season 7)	
2020	Dancing with the Stars	Herself	Contestant (season 29)	
2021–2023	All Rise	Corrine Cuthbert	Recurring role (season 2), 5 episodes	
2022	Girl in Room 13	Janie	Television film, posthumous release	
2023	The Idol	Jocelyn's mother	Television series, scenes deleted	

=== Directing ===
Year	Title	Notes	Ref.
1998	Stripping for Jesus	Short film	
2000	If These Walls Could Talk 2	Segment: "2000"	
2001	On the Edge	Segment: Reaching Normal	
2001	Ellen DeGeneres: American Summer Documentary	Never released	

== Awards and nominations ==
Year	Recipient	Award	Category	Result	Ref.
1989	Another World	Daytime Emmy Awards	Outstanding Younger Actress in a Drama Series	Nominated	
1989	Another World	Soap Opera Digest Awards	Outstanding Female Newcomer – Daytime	Won	
1991	Another World	Daytime Emmy Awards	Outstanding Younger Actress in a Drama Series	Won	
1992	Another World	Soap Opera Digest Awards	Outstanding Lead Actress in a Daytime Drama	Won	
1997	Wag the Dog	Satellite Awards	Best Supporting Actress – Motion Picture	Nominated	
1997	Wag the Dog and Donnie Brasco	National Board of Review Awards	Best Supporting Actress	Won	
1998	Psycho	Golden Raspberry Awards	Worst Actress	Nominated	
1999	Psycho	Saturn Awards	Best Supporting Actress	Nominated	
1999	Psycho	Fangoria Chainsaw Awards	Best Actress	Nominated	
1999	Six Days, Seven Nights	Blockbuster Entertainment Awards	Favorite Actress – Comedy/Romance	Nominated	
2000	Herself	GLAAD Media Awards	Stephen F. Kolzak Award	Won	
2000	Herself	Women in Film Lucy Awards	Lucy Award	Won	
2004	Gracie's Choice	Primetime Emmy Awards	Outstanding Supporting Actress in a Miniseries or a Movie	Nominated	
2004	The Dead Will Tell	Saturn Awards	Best Actress on Television	Nominated	
2004	Twentieth Century	Tony Awards	Best Performance by a Leading Actress in a Play	Nominated	
2019	Herself	Sarasota Film Festival	Career Tribute Award	Won	

== Biographical sources ==
=== Autobiographies ===
- Heche, Anne (2001). Call Me Crazy: A Memoir. New York: Simon & Schuster. ISBN 978-0-7432-1689-0. OCLC 47243952.(Call Me Crazy at the Internet Archive)
  - (audiobook edition, 2001) New York: Simon & Schuster Audio. ISBN 0743518594 (CD), ISBN 0743518586 (cassette)
- Heche, Anne (2023). Call Me Anne. New York: Viva Editions. ISBN 978-1-62778-331-6. (print), ISBN 9781627785440 (ebook). (upcoming)

=== Other sources ===
- Bergman, Susan (1994). Anonymity. New York: Farrar, Straus and Giroux. ISBN 978-0-374-25407-0. (Anonymity at the Internet Archive)
- Heche, Nancy (2006). The Truth Comes Out (2014 ebook ed.). Grand Rapids, MI: Revell. ISBN 978-1-4412-2522-1.
- Stockwell, Anne (November 6, 2001). "The agony and the ecstasy of Anne Heche". The Advocate. pp. 32–41. (Text transcript.)
