= My Home Is Not in This World =

Studio album by Natalie Bergman
- Released: July 18, 2025
- Length: 42:40
- Label: Third Man
- Producer: Elliot Bergman

Natalie Bergman chronology
Keep Those Teardrops from Falling (2021)	My Home Is Not in This World (2025)

Singles from My Home Is Not in This World
- 1. "Gunslinger" Released: April 23, 2025; 2. "Dance" Released: May 21, 2025

My Home Is Not in This World is the second studio album by American singer-songwriter Natalie Bergman. It was released on July 18, 2025, via Third Man.

== Background ==
The album, incorporating elements of gospel, folk, soul, indie pop, and country, consists of twelve songs with a total runtime of approximately forty-three minutes. "Gunslinger" was released as a single on April 23, 2025, alongside a music video directed by Andreas Ekelund, starring Ian Svenonius. It was followed by the second single "Dance" on May 21, 2025.

== Reception ==
Professional ratings
Review scores
Source	Rating
AllMusic	4/5 stars
Paste	7.0/10
Spectrum Culture	75%

The album received a 7.0 rating from Paste, whose reviewer Tiernan Cannon described it as "self-consciously planted in a sepia-tinged yesteryear, a beautiful, slow-moving work designed to offer both the artist and her listeners a moment to unplug from the blue-lit coolness of the digital contemporary and to luxuriate in the analog warmth of an idealized past."

Spectrum Culture's J Simpson assigned it a rating of 75%, noting it as "a home run – one of the prettiest, most passionate, heartfelt, intimate and relaxing albums of the year." In a four-star review for AllMusic, Thom Jurek referred to the album as "a true gem," opining that "the analog-to-tape technique adds the necessary warmth and dimension to stand apart from facile digital sounds."

== Track listing ==
My Home Is Not in This World track listing
No.	Title	Writer(s)	Length
1.	"Lonely Road"	Natalie Bergman	4:28
2.	"Gunslinger"	N. Bergman; Elliot Bergman; Nick Movshon; Homer Steinweiss	3:27
3.	"Dance"	N. Bergman	2:44
4.	"Stop, Please Don't Go"	N. Bergman; E. Bergman	3:38
5.	"You Can Have Me"	N. Bergman; Doc McKinney	3:57
6.	"My Home Is Not in This World"	N. Bergman; E. Bergman	3:13
7.	"Looking for You"	N. Bergman	3:26
8.	"Didn't Get to Say Goodbye"	N. Bergman; E. Bergman	3:39
9.	"Changes"	N. Bergman	4:17
10.	"I'll Be Your Number One"	N. Bergman	2:58
11.	"Song for Arthur"	N. Bergman	4:01
12.	"California"	N. Bergman	2:52
Total length:			42:40

== Personnel ==
Credits adapted from Tidal.

- Natalie Bergman – lead vocals (all tracks), acoustic guitar (track 1), electric guitar (2), piano (3, 5, 11, 12), drums (4), recorder (6), synthesizer (10)
- Elliot Bergman – production (all tracks), organ (2), synthesizer (3, 6), flute (4, 5, 8, 11), background vocals (6), piano (9)
- Ben Lumsdaine – electric guitar (1, 2, 8, 10), bass guitar (3–5, 6, 12), drums (7)
- Homer Steinweiss – drums (1, 2, 7–9)
- Nick Movshon – bass guitar (1, 2, 8, 9)
- Neal Francis – piano (1), organ (7, 10)
- Odessa Jorgensen – violin (1, 7, 9)
- Matt Ulery – bass guitar (2)
- Aurelien Pederzoli – violin (2)
- Chisuan Yang – violin (2)
- Dominic Johnson – violin (2)
- Danke – background vocals (3)
- Erik Hall – bass guitar (4), acoustic guitar (9), electric guitar (10, 11)
- Doc McKinney – bass guitar (5)
- Kelen Harrison – bass guitar (7)
- Zac Sokolow – electric guitar (7)
