= Sharee Miller =

American convicted murderer

- Born: Sharee Paulette Kitley Miller; October 13, 1971 (age 55); Flint, Michigan, U.S.
- Spouse: Bruce Miller (murdered)
- Children: 2 sons, 1 daughter, 2 grandchildren
- Status: Incarcerated In Women's Huron Valley Correctional Facility, Pittsfield Charter Township
- Criminal charges: Second degree murder and conspiracy to commit murder
- Penalty: Life in prison

Sharee Paulette Kitley Miller (born October 13, 1971) is an American woman convicted of plotting the murder of her husband, Bruce Miller, over the internet with her online lover Jerry Cassaday, who later died by suicide.

== Murder, trial and incarceration ==
Bruce Miller was found dead at his junkyard in Mt. Morris, Michigan on November 8, 1999, killed by a 20 gauge shotgun.

After Sharee was arrested in February 2000, she was held without bail until her trial. On December 12, 2000, the trial began and her case made national headlines. According to the prosecution, Sharee wanted Bruce dead for his money, and a divorce would not have given her enough. After two days of deliberation, on December 22, the jury found Sharee Miller guilty on all charges. On January 29, 2001, Genesee County Circuit Court Judge Judith Fullerton sentenced Miller to life in prison for the conspiracy to commit murder charge and 54 to 81 years for second-degree murder. She served part of her term at the Robert Scott Correctional Facility in Plymouth, Michigan and, as of 2019, was serving a life sentence at the Women's Huron Valley Correctional Facility in Ypsilanti, Michigan. Her mother had custody of one of her three children.

== Recent events ==
In 2007, while in prison, Miller was diagnosed with posttraumatic stress disorder and other mental illnesses. She also claimed that she wanted to give back to the people she had selfishly taken from.

In August 2008, a federal court judge overturned her conviction and ordered that she receive a new trial. The judge found that the suicide note from Cassaday (her boyfriend and the one who committed the homicide) should never have been admitted into court and seen by the jurors because Cassaday was dead and could not be cross examined.

On July 16, 2009, a federal court judge ordered Sharee Miller's immediate release from prison on bond pending the new trial which was ordered in August 2008. In response, on July 17, 2009, Genesee County Prosecutor David Leyton ordered that Miller immediately be re-arrested from prison where she was taken to the Genesee County Jail and held without bond to await new charges. Sharee Miller was arraigned on July 22, 2009, again on charges of second-degree murder and conspiracy to commit premeditated first-degree murder. The new trial was scheduled to begin on October 20, 2009. Miller's attorneys appealed this action. The retrial was put on hold pending the federal appeal.

On July 29, 2009, Sharee Miller was released from the Genesee County Jail on a $100,000 recognizance bond until her new trial began.

In December 2009, Sharee Miller was found using the popular social networking site Facebook. Miller's lawyer, David Nickola, said that there was no reason for his client to be barred from using a computer, but Sharee's Facebook page was temporarily deactivated when it attracted publicity. "I don't think there's anything inappropriate about it," Nickola said. He states that Sharee used Facebook to keep in touch with her family members, and her son who is overseas in the military. "She's an innocent person out in society, and she's doing positive things," Nickola said. "Having a Facebook page to communicate with her son who is serving in the military overseas is nothing inappropriate whatsoever." While having a Facebook page is not a violation of Miller's bond, Genesee County Prosecutor David Leyton said this is a perfect example of why people need to be careful when they're online. "People have to be careful when they're communicating with others who they don't know on the Internet," Leyton said.

On June 21, 2010, a panel of the U.S. Court of Appeals upheld the August 2008 federal ruling that the Cassaday suicide note was not admissible.

On November 14, 2011, the US Supreme Court vacated the Court of Appeals decision and remanded the case back to the Sixth Circuit Court of Appeals to reconsider the case based on recent U.S. Supreme Court case law. On February 16, 2012, the Sixth Circuit remanded the case to the District Court.

On August 2, 2012, the District Court entered its opinion and ordered reinstatement of Miller's convictions and revoked her bond. The court held the suicide note possessed sufficient guarantees of trustworthiness to satisfy the defendant's constitutional right of confrontation. It also found that the Michigan Court of Appeals' factual determination, that the statements were spontaneous, voluntary, made to Cassaday's parents, and less likely to be fabricated because he was about to kill himself, were reasonable findings.

On February 11, 2014, the United States Court of Appeals for the Sixth Circuit affirmed the federal district court's reinstatement of Miller's convictions and sentences.

In 2016, Sharee Miller, in a four-page typed letter sent to Judge Fullerton, admitted to her role in her husband's death.

On August 28, 2017, Judge Judith A. Fullerton of the Genesee County Circuit Court issued an opinion denying Miller's motion for relief from judgment.

== In popular culture ==
External videos
- Dateline NBC - "Instant Message Murder" original air date: March 2010
- Snapped Oxygen - "Sharee Miller" original air date: March 2005
- Forensic Files - "Web of Seduction" original air date: 8 March 2006
- Murder, Mystery & Makeup - "Murder on the Web: Catfish Gone Wrong!" original air date: 5 June 2023

The trial made national headlines; Miller's life was profiled on A&E American Justice, Investigation Discovery's Deadly Women and on the Oxygen Channel's true crime series Snapped. The case was the subject of a book, Fatal Error, by Kansas City Star reporter Mark Morris and Paul Janczewski.

A television movie produced by Lifetime Television titled Fatal Desire, starring Eric Roberts and Anne Heche, was based on the case. There also was an episode on Forensic Files about this case ("Web of Seduction", season 8, episode 24). The case was covered in a 2017 episode of Murderous Affairs titled "Dead Silence." Miller also admitted her crimes on the television show 20/20 in February 2022.

On April 7, 2025, the case was covered by John B. Allen on his YouTube podcast channel "MrBallen Podcast", branded as one of the Internet’s first killers.

== See also ==
- List of homicides in Michigan
