= Natalie Bergman =

American singer-songwriter (born 1989)

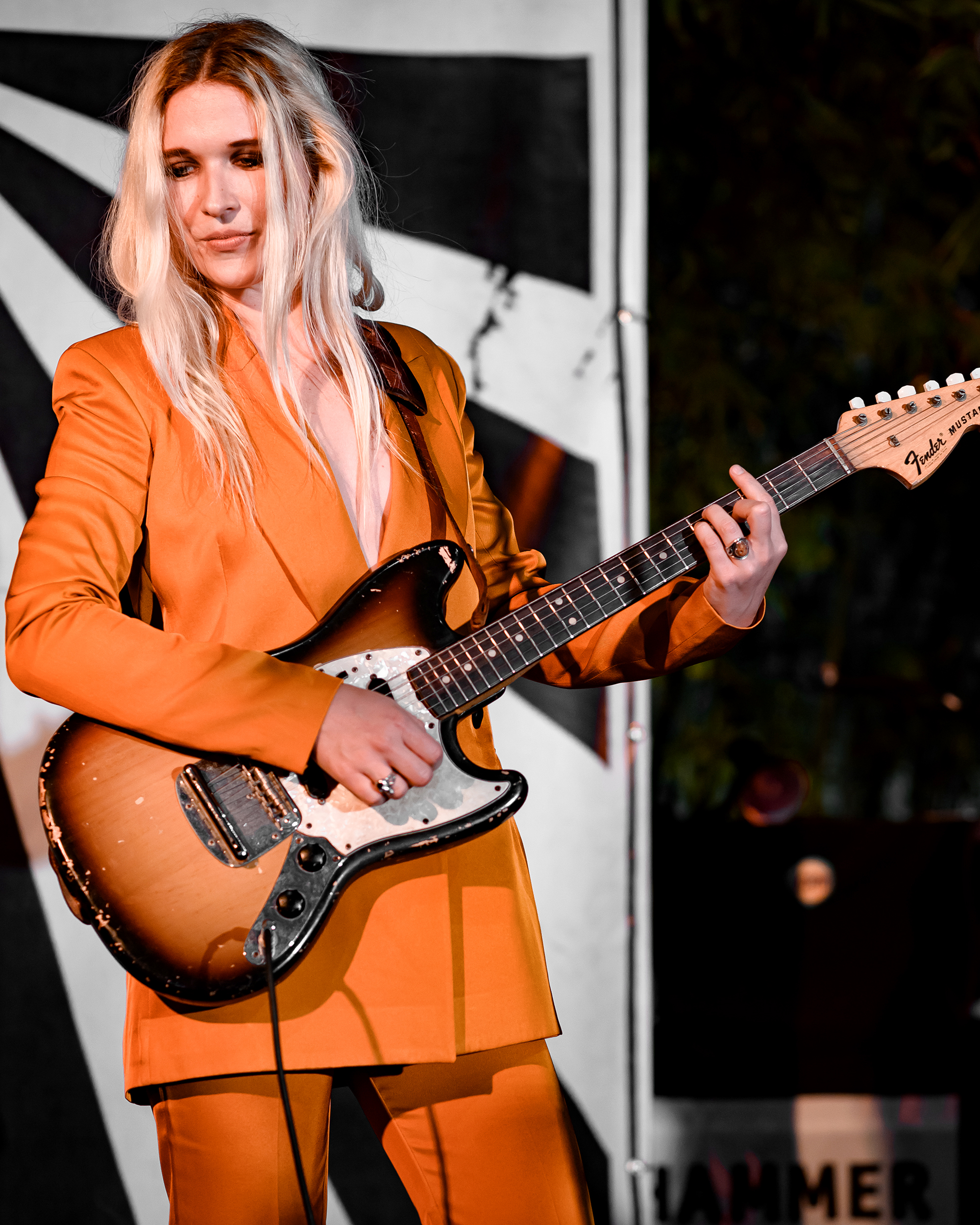
- Bergman performing with Wild Belle in 2019

Background information
- Born: 1988 or 1989 (age 37–38)
- Origin: Barrington, Illinois, U.S.
- Genres: Soul, gospel, folk pop
- Occupation: Singer-songwriter
- Instruments: Vocals, drums, piano, guitar
- Years active: 2011–present
- Labels: Third Man, Columbia

Natalie Bergman (born 1989) is an American singer-songwriter. She is one half of the duo Wild Belle, along with her brother Elliot Bergman. Her debut solo album, Mercy, was released on Third Man Records on May 7, 2021. Her second solo album, My Home Is Not in This World, was released on Third Man Records on July 18, 2025. She is based in Los Angeles.

== Early life ==
Bergman was raised in Barrington, Illinois, a suburb of Chicago, to Judson and Susan Bergman. She is the niece of the late actress Anne Heche. She attended Francis W. Parker School in Chicago, and studied at Berklee College of Music in Boston. Bergman is a devout Christian.

== Career ==
After moving to New York, Bergman started out as a member of her brother Elliot's band Nomo, adding vocals to the 2011 Nomo and Shawn Lee single "Upside Down". She was fired from Nomo, but then she and Elliot formed the psychedelic pop duo Wild Belle. Wild Belle has released three albums: Isles (2013), Dreamland (2016), and Everybody One of a Kind (2019).

In 2019, Bergman's father and stepmother were killed in a car accident. Bergman then spent a week in a silent retreat at The Monastery of Christ in the Desert in Chama Valley in New Mexico. The resulting gospel-folk album, Mercy, is a reflection on the tragedy, and on Bergman's own spirituality. Her debut solo album, it was recorded in Los Angeles at her brother Elliot's home studio. In July 2021, she released two tracks with Beck: a cover of Lion's 1975 soul single "You've Got a Woman" and Beck's remix of "Paint the Rain" from Mercy.

On September 30, 2021, she released the EP Live at Electric Lady on Spotify, part of a series of live performances at Electric Lady Studios. It features seven songs from her album Mercy and a cover of Jimi Hendrix's "Angel". On November 5, 2021, she released the four-song EP Keep Those Teardrops From Falling. On July 29, 2022, she released the single "The Little Bird" as part of For the Birds: The Birdsong Project, Volume III.

On April 23, 2025, Bergman released the single "Gunslinger" in advance of her second solo album, My Home Is Not in This World, which was released on Third Man Records on July 18, 2025.

On October 22, 2026, Bergman released the single "White Oak" along with "White Oak - Kosta G Remix" and announcement her upcoming EP I Killed A North American Songbird, scheduled for release on Third Man Records on November 6, 2026.

== Discography ==
=== Albums ===
Title	Release details	Peak chart positions
Title	Release details	FRA Rock
Mercy	Released: May 7, 2021; Label: Third Man Records; Formats: LP, CD, digital download, streaming	—
My Home Is Not in This World	Released: July 18, 2025; Label: Third Man Records; Formats: LP, CD, digital download, streaming	79
"—" denotes a recording that did not chart or was not released in that territory.

=== EPs ===
Title	Release details
Live at Electric Lady	Released: September 30, 2021; Label: Third Man Records; Formats: Streaming
Keep Those Teardrops From Falling	Released: November 5, 2021; Label: Third Man Records; Formats: Streaming
I Killed A North American Songbird	Release: November 6, 2026; Label: Third Man Records; Formats: Streaming, CD

=== Singles ===
- "Talk to the Lord" (2021)
- "Shine Your Light on Me" (2021)
- "Home at Last" (2021)
- "Paint the Rain (Pachyman Remix)" (2021)
- "Paint the Rain (Beck Remix)" (2021)
- "You've Got a Woman" feat. Beck (2021)
- "The Little Bird" (2022)
- "Gunslinger" (2025)
- "Dance" (2025)
- "Lonely Road" (2025)
- "White Oak" (2026)
