= Nancy Heche =

American activist (born 1937)

Nancy Prickett Heche
- Born: Nancy Abigail Baker Prickett; March 10, 1937 (age 89)
- Education: BS, Education, 1959, Indiana University; MA, Pastoral Counseling, 1996, Loyola University Chicago; DMin, Counseling, 2003, Garrett–Evangelical Theological Seminary
- Occupations: Pastoral counselor, author, activist
- Years active: 2005-present
- Spouse: Donald Heche (died 1983)
- Children: 5, including Susan Bergman and Anne Heche

Nancy Abigail Baker Heche (/heɪtʃ/; née Prickett, born March 10, 1937) is an American activist, author, and counselor. In 2006, she published a memoir entitled The Truth Comes Out. Heche is the mother of the actress Anne Heche and writer and literary scholar Susan Bergman.

== Early life and family ==
Heche is the daughter of Marietta Susan (Tukey) and Richard Carleton Prickett. As a child, she attended a Methodist church and was raised in Indiana.

== Career and advocacy ==
Since 1997, Heche has been a Christian pastoral counselor.

Beginning in 2005, Heche has been an activist on behalf of Love Won Out, a group with ties to Focus on the Family. According to Heche, homosexuality is a sin, and people can change their sexual orientation through faith in Jesus Christ. She has spoken in many areas of the country, often at churches and other organized events, about "leaving homosexuality". Heche has been a speaker for Parents and Friends of Ex-Gays and Gays (PFOX). On September 8, 2006, Heche was the "Back of the Book guest" on the Fox News show The O'Reilly Factor. She appeared twice on the Christian Broadcasting Network's Engaging your World in December 2006.

In 2006, Heche published a memoir entitled The Truth Comes Out.

Heche adheres to the Bible's "mandate that Christians must love, gays and lesbians included". She has said, "We are supposed to be known by our love. So to categorize it or think it's going to be different for someone who is living homosexually is a misconception. We just show love." Heche has been criticized by other Christian activists, both those who believe that a person's sexuality is determined by God and those who believe that homosexuality is a sin.

In 2010, Heche and Joe Dallas published a book entitled The Complete Christian Guide to Understanding Homosexuality: A Biblical and Compassionate Response to Same-Sex Attraction.

== Personal life ==
Heche met the man she would marry, Donald Joe Heche, in high school. Her husband co-founded a schismatic fundamentalist Baptist church. They lived with their children on an isolated compound in the Amish country near Burton, Ohio from the early 1960s until 1971. In 1983, Donald Heche died of AIDS. Upon learning of the diagnosis, Heche became aware that her husband had been a closeted gay man. Three months following the death of her husband, Heche's 18-year-old son Nathan was killed in a car crash.

=== Relationship with Anne Heche ===
In 1997, Nancy's daughter, Anne Heche, publicly announced her relationship with comedian Ellen DeGeneres. Nancy Heche later commented that Anne "became sort of the poster child for coming out and bringing the whole homosexual issue into the public eye and even glamorizing and humorizing it, laughing about it, making it just another kind of love relationship". Heche said her daughter's sexuality was "like a betrayal of an unspoken vow: We will never have anything to do with homosexuals." After reading the Old Testament book of Isaiah, Heche became convinced that sexual orientation change was possible for her daughter, and likened what she believed would be their eventual reconciliation to the parable of the Prodigal Son.

Nancy Heche became estranged from Anne Heche after the latter confronted her about her father's alleged sexual abuse. In her 2001 memoir Call Me Crazy, Anne Heche wrote that when she contracted genital herpes as an infant, her mother insisted that it was a diaper rash and refused to take her to the doctor. Heche vehemently denied her daughter's allegations.

Anne Heche died in August 2022 following an automobile accident.

== Published works ==
- Heche, Nancy (2006). The Truth Comes Out. Revell. ISBN 9781441225221.
- Dallas, Joe; Heche, Nancy (July 1, 2010). The Complete Christian Guide to Understanding Homosexuality: A Biblical and Compassionate Response to Same-Sex Attraction. Harvest House Publishers. ISBN 978-0-7369-2507-5.

== Bibliography ==
Heche, Nancy (2006). The Truth Comes Out (2014 ebook ed.). Revell. ISBN 9781441225221.
