= Susan Bergman =

American writer and literary scholar (1957–2006)

- Born: Susan Claire Heche; May 5, 1957; Bloomington, Indiana, U.S.
- Died: January 1, 2006 (aged 48); Barrington, Illinois, U.S.
- Education: BA, Art, Wheaton College (Illinois), 1979; PhD, Literature, Northwestern University, 1992 (specialization: 20th Century poetry)
- Occupation: Writer
- Spouse: Judson Bergman (m. 1979)
- Children: Elliot Bergman; Natalie Bergman
- Relatives: Nancy Heche (mother); Anne Heche (sister)
- Writing career
- Genres: Memoir, poetry, nonfiction, essay
- Subjects: autobiography, religion
- Notable work: Anonymity (1994)
- Website: SusanBergman.com (archived)

Susan Bergman (née Heche; May 5, 1957 – January 1, 2006) was an American writer and literary scholar.

== Early life ==
Bergman was born as Susan Claire Heche on May 5, 1957, in Bloomington, Indiana. She was one of five children of Donald "Don" Joe Heche and Nancy Heche (née Prickett).

Bergman was the sister of actress Anne Heche, who also wrote a memoir about their father and family background in 2001.

== Writing ==
Bergman wrote her memoir Anonymity in 1994, which recounts the discovery, in 1983, of the closeted homosexuality and double life of her father, Don, a Christian choir director while he was dying of HIV/AIDS. Anonymity had its beginnings as Bergman's doctoral dissertation at Northwestern University.

In 1996, Bergman was editor of an anthology titled Martyrs: Contemporary Writers on Modern Lives of Faith, in which contemporary authors reflected on the lives of 20th Century religious and political martyrs. Bergman contributed the introductory chapter, a reflection on the nature of martyrdom and what it teaches about faith.

Bergman was also a lecturer at, and taught literature at Northwestern University, New York University, and the University of Notre Dame.

== Personal life ==
Heche married musician Judson Bergman in 1979 and they had several children, including musicians Elliot Bergman and Natalie Bergman of band Wild Belle.

Like most of her family, Bergman was a life-long evangelical Christian, and religious themes were a frequent subject of her writing. In 1996, Christianity Today named her in their profile of "Up and Comers: Fifty evangelical leaders 40 and under". However, she stated that she did not consider herself part of the Christian right. Quoting the words of a friend of hers, Bergman stated: "I dare to believe that when Jesus invites all who labor and are heavy-laden, he's not screening for HIV, or voting behavior, or asking whether or not someone has had a divorce, or an abortion."

Three months after her father's death from AIDS-related complications on March 3, 1983, aged 45, Bergmans's 18-year-old brother Nathan was killed in a car crash when his vehicle missed a curve and struck a tree. The remainder of her immediate family subsequently moved to Chicago to be closer to other family members.

== Death ==
Bergman died on January 1, 2006, in Barrington, Illinois, at the age of 48, after a three-year battle against a brain tumor.

== Bibliography ==
=== Books ===
- Bergman, Susan (1994). Anonymity. Farrar, Straus and Giroux. ISBN 0374254079.
- Buried Life. (unpublished)

=== Anthologies ===
- Bergman, Susan (1996). Martyrs: Contemporary Writers on Modern Lives of Faith. HarperSanFrancisco. ISBN 0060611200. (editor)

== Sources ==
- Heche, Anne (2001). Call Me Crazy: A Memoir. New York: Simon & Schuster. ISBN 978-0-7432-1689-0. OCLC 47243952.(Call Me Crazy at the Internet Archive)
  - (audiobook edition, 2001) New York: Simon & Schuster Audio. ISBN 0743518594 (CD), ISBN 0743518586 (cassette)
- Heche, Nancy (2006). The Truth Comes Out (2014 ebook ed.). Grand Rapids, MI: Revell. ISBN 978-1-4412-2522-1.
