= Fatal Desire =

- Swedish DVD cover
- Also known as: Deceptively Yours; Fatal Error
- Genre: Thriller
- Written by: Paul Janczewski; Mark Morris
- Directed by: Ralph Hemecker
- Starring: Anne Heche; Eric Roberts; Kathleen York; Melyssa Ade
- Composer: Joel Goldsmith
- Country of origin: United States
- Original language: English

Production
- Running time: 113 minutes
- Production company: Goldenring Productions

Original release
- Network: Lifetime
- Release: April 3, 2006

Fatal Desire is a made-for-TV film produced by Lifetime Television. It premiered April 3, 2006, on the network and starred Eric Roberts as Joe, an ex-policeman turned casino pit boss in Atlantic City, and Anne Heche as Tanya Sullivan, a bored housewife with very manipulative ways.

The film was based on, or "inspired by," the true crime book Fatal Error by journalists Mark Morris and Paul Janczewski. The book in turn was based on the real life case against Sharee Miller. The film featured two original songs by New Orleans–based singer/songwriter Kristin Diable and marked the cable television premiere of her work. As of 2024 the film is available on streaming services with the onscreen title Fatal Error.

== Tagline ==
A dark, sexually charged true crime thriller about a perfect match that becomes a perfect nightmare.

== Plot ==
Joe is a newly divorced, single dad in his forties living in Atlantic City, New Jersey. Though he makes a decent living working as a casino pit boss, and loves the time he is getting to spend with his son, he still longs to start a new relationship. So Joe decides to explore the world of online dating, and while in a chatroom meets a Pittsburgh woman in her twenties who calls herself "sexykitten."

After a few months of exchanging messages, they meet in person. After she arrives at his casino to surprise him, Joe learns that her real name is Tanya Sullivan and he is instantly attracted to her. She also reveals that she is married and has a young daughter. However, both Joe and Tanya don't care.

Through several months the relationship grows from hot, passionate sex, into what Joe believes is love. During those months, they continue meeting and Tanya sends Joe pornographic videos of herself. The relationship seems to be going great, until one day Tanya drops a bombshell. She's pregnant with what she believes is Joe's baby. After she tells Joe of her pregnancy, Joe tries to convince Tanya to leave her husband to come and live with him. But Tanya refuses the offer, saying her husband is very dangerous and would never let that happen. Meanwhile, Joe starts to receive threatening emails supposedly sent by Tanya's husband mocking him and saying he knows all about the affair.

Joe asks Tanya to take pictures of the physical abuse that her husband allegedly causes. It's not long before another bombshell is dropped. Tanya tells him that because of her infidelity, her husband and his buddies have beaten her and raped her by the pool behind the house, in the process making her lose the baby, or so Joe thinks.

At this point Joe can't take it anymore. With the blessing of Tanya, who provides directions, he plots and sets out to kill Tanya's husband at his auto repair shop where he succeeds in shooting him to death late one night. During the weeks following the murder, the relationship between Joe and Tanya disintegrates. She refuses to answer his emails and in fact deletes the file on her computer that contains his messages.

So Joe decides to investigate. He travels to Pittsburgh again. There he figures out that everything that Tanya has been telling him is a lie. Tanya was never pregnant (Joe failed to notice an ultrasound tape given to him by Tanya during the supposed pregnancy was actually 10 years old and had been recorded while Tanya was pregnant with her daughter). Her husband never abused her. There is no pool behind the house where she was allegedly raped. Meanwhile, she has refurnished the house with new furniture from her husband's life insurance policy. And worst of all, Tanya has a new boyfriend. Joe is devastated. He returns to Atlantic City where he falls into a deep depression. He starts to drink again, which results in Joe's son leaving to go live with his mom. Joe finally decides to take his own life.

In his suicide note, Joe instructs his friend Paula to make sure a case under his bed gets to the police in Pittsburgh. Armed with the evidence Joe has left for them, the police arrest Tanya, and is eventually convicted of first-degree conspiracy to commit murder.

== Cast ==
- Anne Heche as Tanya Sullivan
- Eric Roberts as Joe Donnely
- Kathleen York as Paula
- James Edward Campbell as Teddy Donnely
- Mark A. Owen as Mark Sullivan
- Jessica Parsons as Molly Sullivan
