= On the Edge (2001 TV film) =

- Genre: Science fiction
- Written by: Keith Laumer; Walter M. Miller Jr. Bruce Holland Rogers
- Screenplay by: Anne Heche; John W. Herrera; Mary Stuart Masterson; Crispin Whittell
- Directed by: Anne Heche; Mary Stuart Masterson; Helen Mirren; Jana Sue Memel
- Starring: Scott Lowell; Jolene Blalock; John Goodman; Sydney Tamiia Poitier; Anthony LaPaglia; Karen Sillas; Andie MacDowell; Paul Rudd
- Music by: Jason Frederick (Happy Birthday); Guy Dagul (Reaching Normal); Jim Goodwin; David Renik
- Country of origin: United States
- Original language: English

Production
- Producer: Jana Sue Memel
- Running time: 95 minutes
- Production companies: Chanticleer Films; Paramount Television; Paramount Pictures

Original release
- Network: Showtime
- Release: June 28, 2001

On the Edge is a 2001 television film, broadcast on Showtime. It is an anthology film, with each segment directed by an actress with few or no prior directing credits and adapted from an existing science fiction short story. The film was part of the larger Showtime Directed By series.

The film consists of a frame segment, directed by Jana Sue Memel, and three story segments. The first, "Happy Birthday", was directed by Helen Mirren and was based on The Placement Test by Keith Laumer. The second segment, "The Other Side", was directed by Mary Stuart Masterson and based on Lifeboat on a Burning Sea by Bruce Holland Rogers. The third segment, "Reaching Normal", was directed by Anne Heche and based on Command Performance by Walter M. Miller Jr.

== Cast ==
=== Frame segment ===
- Scott Lowell as Charlie
- Jolene Blalock as Charlie's Wife
- Stephen Tobolowsky as Tom
- Kathleen Wilhoite as Lucy

=== Happy Birthday ===
- John Goodman as The Dean
- Sydney Tamiia Poitier as Hannah
- Beverly D'Angelo as Bag Lady
- Christopher Lloyd as Attorney Bum
- David Hyde Pierce as Barney
- Caroline Rhea as Monica
- Jenica Bergere as Sally
- Ken Hudson Campbell as Security Guard
- Roman Danylo as Donald
- Kimiko Gelman as May Lee Ha
- Jean Kasem as Nurse
- Taylor Negron as Policeman
- Travis Wester as Chute Boy
- Dondre Whitfield as Man in Elevator
- Marissa Jaret Winokur as Dean's Secretary
- Helen Mirren as Distinguished Woman

=== The Other Side ===
- Anthony LaPaglia as Dr. Maas/Biobot
- Karen Sillas as Dr. Anna Richardson
- Bruce Davison as Jackson Bierly

=== Reaching Normal ===
- Andie MacDowell as Lisa
- Paul Rudd as Kenneth
- Joey Lauren Adams as Sarah
- Alan Rosenberg as Frank
- Joel Gray as Mensley
- Ellen DeGeneres as Operator

== Reception ==
The film generally received negative or mixed reviews. A review in Variety describes it as "Three short films, all debut directing efforts by well-known actresses... Not surprisingly, the collection is uneven and the work a bit rough, particularly so when the actors also write their own scripts, as in the case of Mary Stuart Masterson and Anne Heche." According to the website Fantafilm, the film is an "Interesting, even if not entirely successful, trilogy of the fantastic in which the actresses Masterson, Mirren, and Heche try their hand at directing by proposing a vision of the future with disconcerting and satirical tones."

== Promotion ==
The tagline is: "Tales that will take you to the edge... if you dare..."
