= I Dream of Murder =

- Written by: Cynthia Whitcomb
- Directed by: Neill Fearnley
- Starring: Jolene Blalock; Martin Cummins; Carrie Colak
- Countries of origin: Canada; United States
- Original language: English

Production
- Running time: 95 minutes
- Budget: $1,600,000 (estimated)

Original release
- Release: 11 June 2006

I Dream of Murder is a television film directed by Neill Fearnley and starring Jolene Blalock and Martin Cummins.

== Cast ==
- Jolene Blalock as Joanna
- Martin Cummins as Clay
- Carrie Colak as Leslie
- Jeff McGrail
- Judith Buchan as Dorothea
- Tom Carey as Lawyer
- Neill Fearnley as Captain (as Neil Fearnley)
- Khari Jones as Police Officer
- Elizabeth Lavender as Young Joanna
- Greg Lawson as Detective Thorn
- Giovanni Mocibob as Jesse
- Kevin Rothery as Alan
- Joe Norman Shaw as Marshall
