= Slow Burn (2005 film) =

2005 film

- Theatrical poster
- Directed by: Wayne Beach
- Written by: Wayne Beach; Anthony Walton
- Produced by: Stephen Break
- Starring: Ray Liotta; LL Cool J; Mekhi Phifer; Bruce McGill; Chiwetel Ejiofor; Guy Torry; Taye Diggs; Jolene Blalock
- Cinematography: Wally Pfister
- Edited by: Kristina Boden
- Music by: Jeff Rona
- Distributed by: DEJ Productions; GreeneStreet Films International; Lionsgate
- Release dates: September 13, 2005 (TIFF); April 13, 2007
- Running time: 93 minutes
- Country: United States
- Language: English
- Budget: $15.5 million
- Box office: $1.8 million

Slow Burn is a 2005 American drama thriller film directed by Wayne Beach and starring Ray Liotta, Jolene Blalock and LL Cool J. It is notable for the extended period between production and eventual release. A crime drama, the film was produced in 2003, was finally given a showing at the 2005 Toronto International Film Festival, and finally got a proper theatrical release in 2007.

== Plot ==
Nora Timmer, a biracial (African and European descent) woman, is being questioned by Ford Cole, the District Attorney. Nora, who is the Assistant District Attorney, claims she was being raped by Isaac Duparde when she shot him in the head. Journalist Ty Trippin interviews Ford; Ford surprises Ty by anticipating his first two questions.

Nora explains to Ford that she had first met Isaac a week earlier at a music store, where he came on to her, asking to give her a ride on the rainy night. Nora politely rebuffed his advances, but was forced to accept his offer when she found herself stranded in the rain with no cab to respond to her calls. Issac locked the door to his car when Nora tried to exit upon reaching her home, only to give her a music cassette as a compliment. Nora tells Ford that Issac waited for her in her house one night, grabbed her from behind, and raped her.

Luther Pinks, claiming to be an associate of Isaac, shows up to meet Ford and relates his version of the story, stating that Isaac's death was not self-defence, but murder. He states that Nora had seduced Isaac into falling in love and ultimately becoming obsessed with her. He tells Ford about an 'African violet' tattoo on Nora's backside to support his claims. Ford tends to believe him, as he himself had seen it when he and Nora had sex.

Isaac's home is set ablaze and Ford receives an odd voicemail from the deceased suggesting a conspiracy involving Nora. Later, Luther tells Ford of a deal Nora supposedly offered Isaac for his cousin who was recently booked on drug charges; if his aunt were to agree to sell her home to an interested party, his cousin would walk. Luther also reveals Nora's dirty little secret—that she isn't biracial but is using being a minority to benefit her career and to satisfy some strange obsession with being black.

== Cast ==
- Ray Liotta as Ford Cole
- Jolene Blalock as Nora Timmer
- LL Cool J as Luther Pinks
- Mekhi Phifer as Isaac Duperde
- Taye Diggs as Jeffrey Sykes
- Bruce McGill as Godfrey
- Chiwetel Ejiofor as Ty Trippin / Danny
- Guy Torry as Chet Price

== Release ==
It was released in American theaters on April 13, 2007, but performed poorly. It had an opening weekend of $778,123 in ticket sales and closed in just 2 weeks with a domestic total of $1,237,615 and $559,641 from foreign markets for a worldwide total of $1,797,256. It ranks among the top ten widely released films for having the biggest second weekend drop at the box office, dropping 84.7% from $676,048 to $91,748.

The DVD was released in North America on July 24, 2007, and sold 44,720 units in the opening weekend, translating to revenue of $893,953. This does not include Blu-ray/DVD sales rentals and sales tracking does not extend beyond the first week.

The film has themes of inter-racial dating, "passing" or pretending to be a member of another race, stereotypes included, and using a rape defense to the accusation of murder.

== Reception ==
On the review aggregator website Rotten Tomatoes, 9% of 34 critics' reviews are positive, with an average rating of 3.6/10. The website's consensus reads: "With wooden acting and hammy, overheated dialogue, Slow Burn isn't so much a noir as it is a mediocre parody of one." Metacritic, which uses a weighted average, assigned the film a score of 34 out of 100, based on 14 critics, indicating "generally unfavorable" reviews.

== Novel ==
The screenplay is based on a short story by Wayne Beach and Anthony Walton. Wayne Beach converted the story to screenplay and directed the film.
