= Jolene Blalock =

American actress and model

- Blalock in 2026
- Born: Jolene K. Blalock; March 5, 1975 (age 51); San Diego, California, U.S.
- Other names: Jolene Rapino, Jolene
- Occupations: Actress; model
- Years active: 1998–2017; 2024–present
- Spouse: Michael Rapino (m. 2003)
- Children: 3

Jolene K. Blalock (/ˈbleɪlɒk/ BLAY-lok; born March 5, 1975), later credited mononymously as Jolene, is an American actress and model. She is best known for playing the Vulcan first officer and science officer T'Pol on the science-fiction series Star Trek: Enterprise. Her other work includes guest-star appearances on television series and in films.

== Early life ==
Blalock was born and raised in San Diego, California, with three siblings. She spent her childhood surfing and developing artistic skills.

== Career ==
=== Early work ===
Blalock left home at age 17 to model in Europe and Asia. She has appeared on the cover of many men's lifestyle magazines, was twice featured in Maxim's "Girls of Maxim" gallery, and was named the 10th sexiest woman in the world in 2003 by FHM. She posed for a clothed fashion layout in Playboy in April 2002, and was later interviewed by the magazine for its "20Q" section in February 2005.

She appeared in the music video for Phil Collins 1997 song Wear My Hat, as the first of many fans vying for his attention.

She made her television debut on the sitcom Veronica's Closet, before guest appearances on Love Boat: The Next Wave, CSI: Crime Scene Investigation, and JAG. She appeared as Medea in a television movie adaptation of Jason and the Argonauts (2000). She also appeared in the TV movie On the Edge (2001) and the miniseries The Diamond Hunters (2001) before being cast on Star Trek: Enterprise. She appeared in the music video "Denise" (1999) by Fountains of Wayne.

=== Star Trek: Enterprise (2001–2005) ===
Landing one of the leading roles on Star Trek: Enterprise was Blalock's biggest break. About her time on the show, she recalled:

We're really fortunate. More than 100 people are working together on this every day and we haven't had one argument. It's incredible. I've had bad days in my personal life, but it's always a joy to go to work. There's also a sense of immortality that the show gives you, that you're working on something that will never die, that your contribution will last forever. That's a very special feeling.

In Enterprise, Blalock played Subcommander T'Pol, a science attaché at the Vulcan embassy on Earth who was initially assigned by Vulcan Ambassador Soval (a recurring role played by Gary Graham) as an observer on the ship's first mission, in the pilot episode "Broken Bow". At the end of that episode, she is asked to remain on Enterprise as its science officer by Captain Jonathan Archer (played by Scott Bakula). As the series progressed, she assumed the position of first officer, and at the start of the third season Xindi story arc, she resigns her Vulcan position to remain on Enterprise when the Vulcan High Command orders her back to Vulcan. Early in the fourth season, she formalizes her position in Starfleet and is granted a field commission of commander, retaining her role as the ship's first officer, where she remained for the rest of the series.

Blalock has not participated in conventions or given interviews regarding her role on Star Trek: Enterprise except for FedCon XIV in May 2005, but did agree to join a 2013 cast reunion for an interview during the Blu-ray conversion and production. She also appeared as a parody version of herself attending a Star Trek convention in a 2009 episode of the sitcom 10 Items or Less titled "Star Trok."

Attending her first Trek event in almost a decade, Blalock walked the red carpet for 2021's Star Trek Day on September 8, 2021.

=== 2003–2017 ===
Blalock appeared in the film Slow Burn, which was shot in 2003 between seasons two and three of Enterprise, unveiled at the Toronto International Film Festival in September 2005, and saw limited theatrical release in 2007.

Blalock guest-starred in two episodes of Stargate SG-1 as Ishta, leader of a group of rebel female warriors.

Blalock was scheduled to appear on an episode of Lost during the 2005–2006 season. Though she filmed some scenes, they were never used in an episode nor featured as "deleted scenes" in the DVD set's bonus material. Set photos from the shooting of a scene surfaced in 2008.

In Starship Troopers 3: Marauder, which was released direct-to-video on August 5, 2008, Blalock played Captain Lola Beck who led a mixed group of survivors on a journey across an alien infested wasteland.

Blalock played Lexa, the wife of a hospitalized porn star, in the 2009 episode "Teamwork" on the series House.

In the second season of Legend of the Seeker, appearing in the January 2009 episodes "Dark" and "Perdition", Blalock played Sister Nicci, a Sister of the Dark.

Blalock had a supporting role as Stacy in the action thriller Sinners and Saints (2010).

Until 2024, Blalock's most recent roles were in the direct-to-video Killing Frisco (2014) and then the TV movie A Man for Every Month (2017).

=== 2024–present ===
Blalock returned to acting to voice an alternate universe version of her Star Trek: Enterprise character in the Star Trek: Lower Decks fifth season episode "Fissure Quest". She was credited mononymously as Jolene in the episode. In 2025, it was announced that she had been cast in Rebel Wilson's film Girl Group where she again was credited as Jolene. She also co-produced and appears in the 2025 Green Day-inspired coming-of-age film Nimrods and co-produced and appears in the 2026 comedy film Rolling Loud: The Movie.

== Personal life ==
Blalock is married to Michael Rapino, CEO of Live Nation. Rapino lived in England and Blalock lived in the U.S. while working on Star Trek: Enterprise. She proposed to him and they married in Negril, Jamaica, on April 22, 2003. They have three sons.

Rapino and Blalock founded the Rapino Foundation, which helps populations in the developing world. Blalock is a supporter of Humane World for Animals, the Equal Justice Initiative, and the Leonardo DiCaprio Foundation. She is also an avid supporter of the Make-A-Wish Foundation.

Blalock is a dog fancier and has appeared on the cover of the UK's K9 Magazine.

== Filmography ==
=== Film ===
Key
†	Denotes films that have not yet been released

Year	Title	Role	Notes
2000	Queen for a Day	Hot Babe in Yellow	Short
2005	Slow Burn	Nora Timmer	
2007	Shadow Puppets	Kate Adams	
2008	Starship Troopers 3: Marauder	Capt. Lola Beck	Video
2010	Sinners and Saints	Stacy	
2011	One Kine Day	CC	
2012	Troubled Teen	Mama	Short
2014	Sex Tape	Catalina	
2014	Killing Frisco	Jolene	
2025	Nimrods	Deb	Also co-producer
2026	Rolling Loud: The Movie	Melanie	Also co-producer
TBA	Girl Group †	TBA	Post-production

=== Television ===
Year	Title	Role	Notes
1998	Veronica's Closet	Woman #3	Episode: "Veronica's Breast Efforts"
1999	Love Boat: The Next Wave	Woman	Episode: "Prom Queen"
2000	G vs E	Libby	Episode: "Cougar Pines"
2000	D.C.	Kristi	Episode: "Truth", "Justice"
2000	Jason and the Argonauts	Medea	TV miniseries
2000	CSI: Crime Scene Investigation	Laura Garris	Episode: "Crate 'n' Burial"
2001	JAG	Cpl. Lisa Antoon	Episode: "Touch and Go"
2001	On the Edge	Charlie's Wife	TV film
2001	The Diamond Hunters	Ruby Grange	TV miniseries
2001–2005	Star Trek: Enterprise	T'Pol	Main role
2003	MTV Icon	Herself	Episode: "Metallica"
2003–2004	Stargate SG-1	Ishta	Episodes: "Birthright", "Sacrifices"
2006	I Dream of Murder	Joanna	TV film
2008	CSI: Miami	Feratelli Porter	Episode: "Bombshell"
2009	House	Lexa	Episode: "Teamwork"
2009	10 Items or Less	Herself	Episode: "Star Trok"
2010	Legend of the Seeker	Sister Nicci	Episodes: "Dark", "Perdition"
2017	A Man for Every Month	Brenda	TV film
2024	Star Trek: Lower Decks	Alternate T'Pol	Episode: "Fissure Quest"; credited mononymously as Jolene
