= The Noel Diary =

2022 film by Charles Shyer

- Official release poster
- Directed by: Charles Shyer
- Screenplay by: Charles Shyer; Rebecca Connor; David Golden
- Based on: The Noel Diary by Richard Paul Evans
- Produced by: Timothy O. Johnson; Stephanie Slack; Margret H. Huddleston
- Starring: Justin Hartley; Barrett Doss; Essence Atkins; Bonnie Bedelia; James Remar
- Cinematography: Ashley Rowe
- Edited by: David Moritz; R.C. Fill
- Music by: Dara Taylor
- Production companies: Johnson Production Group; Off Camera Entertainment
- Distributed by: Netflix
- Release date: November 24, 2022
- Running time: 100 minutes
- Country: United States
- Language: English

The Noel Diary is a 2022 American Christmas romantic comedy drama film directed by Charles Shyer, his last directorial effort before his death in 2024. It is based on the book of the same name written by Richard Paul Evans.

Successful romance novelist Jake Turner, estranged from both of his parents since his youth, returns home to settle his recently deceased mother's estate. There, a diary he finds unlocks secrets to his own and the beautiful Rachel Campbell's pasts.

It was released on November 24, 2022, by Netflix.

== Plot ==
Best-selling author Jake Turner is contacted by his mother Lois' lawyer to inform him of her death. He has inherited everything, including her house in Connecticut. Returning home for the first time since he was 17, 20 years ago, Jake returns to clear out the hoarder's house and settle his estranged mother's estate.

Jake reacquaints himself with the next-door neighbor Ellie, who brings him lunch the next day. He finds out his father Scott, who had abandoned him and Lois shortly after his older seven-year-old brother had died in an accident, had been at his mother's funeral hoping to see him. Ellie asks Jake to help her with a dating app. He quickly writes her profile to get her up and running.

Just as Jake discovers a diary Rachel Campbell, a woman who has been peering at the house ever since he arrived, comes by and introduces herself. She coincidentally has shown up at the same time in search of information about her birth mother Noel, who once was Jake's nanny.

As Jake suggests Rachel talk to Ellie and she has gone out, he proposes they have dinner. As he is a writer, she insists they go Dutch, not realizing how successful he is. Over dinner Rachel tells Jake about her need for certainty and stability, including her tax attorney fiancé Alan. She hopes finding her birth mom will fill a void she has always felt being adopted.

Back at the house, Jake and Rachel connect over a song, she sings the words to a tune he plays on the piano. They then spend the evening clearing out the room. Waking to the sound of Ellie's morning return, they go over in search of answers. Not remembering Rachel's mother well, Ellie suggests they talk to Scott, who lives off the grid in the mountains in Vermont.

Jake initially refuses to go, but Rachel offers to help him find the right words. Taking his Land Rover on their journey, she would rather navigate analog. Rachel shares more, mentioning she has not told Alan about the possible UN job or about looking for her mother with Jake. She finds a diary in Jake's bag, written by a 17-year-old Noel Ellis, who she is sure must be her mom.

On the road, due to an impending storm, they have to stay over in an inn. Rachel, as she is curious, buys Jake's first book. She stays up all night reading it. The next day they almost kiss, but she reminds him of her engagement.

Arriving at Scott's, Rachel encourages Jake to stay until he is beyond the anger. Not only do father and son connect, but Scott is able to tell her about her mom, even show her her wedding invitation and where she probably lives now. Rachel and Jake finally sleep together. However, she gets spooked and leaves him a goodbye note in which she says she can now leave him and Noel behind, satisfied to know she has been loved.

Jake hunts Rachel down at her parents, declaring his love, but she says it is not reciprocated. He finds Noel Hayden, who lets him know she is open to meeting Rachel. Jake returns to his mom's, locating the letters he had never read from his dad. As he is leaving he finds Rachel outside, smiling.

== Cast ==
- Justin Hartley as Jake Turner
- Barrett Doss as Rachel Campbell
- Essence Atkins as Noel Ellis
- Bonnie Bedelia as Ellie Foster
- James Remar as Scott Turner
- Baylen Bielitz as Benjamin Turner
- Aaron Costa Ganis as Matt Segreto
- Jeff Corbett as Ian Page
- Andrea Sooch as Svetlana
- Lucia Spina as book store owner

== Reception ==
On the review aggregator website Rotten Tomatoes, 69% of 16 critics' reviews are positive, with an average rating of 5.4/10. Metacritic, which uses a weighted average, assigned the film a score of 63 out of 100, based on 4 critics, indicating "generally favorable" reviews.

== See also ==
- List of Christmas films
