= Joe Dallas =

Prominent figure in the ex-gay movement (born 1954)

Joe Dallas (born 1954) is a prominent figure in the Christian ex-gay movement and an advocate of conversion therapy.

== Career ==
Dallas is founder of Genesis Counseling in Tustin, California, which specializes in conversion therapy. He is the keynote speaker at one of the monthly weekend retreats on sexual purity titled "Every Man's Battle" (sponsored by New Life Ministries). Dallas focuses on healing "Sexual Addiction, Responding to Pro-gay Theology, Ministering to Parents of Lesbians/Gays, Developing Ministerial Responses to Homosexuals, Apologetics Approaches to the ‘Gay Debate’" He has also written three books and discussed them in the media.

Genesis Counseling claims that homosexuality can be altered and that they are "Reclaiming Godly Sexuality through the Saving Work of Jesus Christ, The Sanctifying Work of the Holy Spirit and the Body Ministry of the Christian Church." Dallas frequently denounces gay rights movements as part of the "homosexual agenda", stating "I’m not sure we can defeat the pro-gay lobby or prevent their goals from being achieved. But win or lose, I don’t want to stand before God and say I did nothing when I had the opportunity to fight."

Dallas served for three years as Chair of the Exodus International Board of Directors and is a member of the American Association of Christian Counselors.

=== Books ===
- Desires in Conflict: Hope for Men Who Struggle with Sexual Identity (2003) ISBN 978-0-7369-1211-2
- When Homosexuality Hits Home: What to Do When a Loved One Says They're Gay (2004) ISBN 978-0-7369-1201-3
- The Gay Gospel?: How Pro-Gay Advocates Misread the Bible (2007) ISBN 978-0-7369-1834-3
- The Complete Christian Guide to Understanding Homosexuality: A Biblical and Compassionate Response to Same-Sex Attraction, co-authored with Nancy Heche.
