= Isles (Wild Belle album) =

Studio album by Wild Belle
- Released: 12 March 2013
- Genres: Reggae; pop; electronica
- Length: 39:57
- Label: Columbia
- Producers: Elliott Bergman; Bill Skibbe

Wild Belle chronology
Isles (2013)	Dreamland (2016)

Singles from Isles
- 1. "Keep You" Released: February 21, 2012; 2. "It's Too Late" Released: September 17, 2012; 3. "Another Girl" Released: September 14, 2013

Professional ratings
Review scores
Source	Rating
Consequence of Sound	3.5/5 stars
NME	1.5/5 stars
DIY	3/5 stars
American Songwriter	3.5/5 stars
The A.V. Club	B−

Isles is the debut studio album by the American brother/sister duo Wild Belle. It was released on March 12, 2013, by Columbia Records. The album encompasses many genres, and its title refers to the band's goal of making each song its own "isle" with a distinct musical style.

== Style and instrumentation ==
The album has a relaxed feeling, with rhythmic yet varied beats and a unique blend of reggae, pop, and electronica. Lead vocalist Natalie Bergman sings in a laid-back, breezy voice. She is accompanied primarily by keyboard, drums, and electric guitar. Fellow band member Elliot Bergman sings lead vocals on "When It's Over."

== Critical reception ==
Upon release, Isles received favorable reviews from music critics. At Metacritic, which assigns a normalized rating out of 100 to reviews by mainstream critics, Isles received an average score of 63, based on 16 reviews. Greg Kot of The Chicago Tribune called the album "deceptively breezy", while praising Natalie Bergman's vocals and questioning Elliot's. Consequence of Sound's Adam Kivel gave the album a C+, saying that the album was not made to meet any expectations, while also praising Natalie's vocals and comparing the album's material to the works of Beach House, Amy Winehouse, and Diana Ross.

Hazel Sheffield of NME, however, was less positive by rating it 3/10. She described the album as "exotic" while also highlighting songs such as "Twisted", in which she contrasted Natalie's vocals to "a greyscale Lily Allen". MusicOMH was also negative with its review of Isles, rating it only two and a half stars while describing the album's material as "mundane" and "turgid".

== Track listing ==
All tracks are written by Elliot Bergman and Natalie Bergman except where noted.

No.	Title	Length
1.	"Keep You"	3:30
2.	"It's Too Late" (E. Bergman, N. Bergman, J.Mittoo)	3:13
3.	"Shine"	4:41
4.	"Twisted"	3:05
5.	"Backslider"	3:23
6.	"Happy Home"	3:45
7.	"Another Girl"	3:52
8.	"Love Like This"	3:58
9.	"When It's Over"	3:33
10.	"June"	4:03
11.	"Take Me Away"	2:54
Total length:		39:57

== Personnel ==
Credits for Isles adapted from AllMusic.

- Elliot Bergman – Producer
- Bill Skibbe – Engineer, Mixer, Producer
- Jackie Mittoo – Composer
- Greg Calbi – Mastering
- Jessica Ruffine – Engineer, Mixing

== Charts ==
Chart (2013)	Peak position
US Billboard 200	113
US Top Alternative Albums (Billboard)	20
US Heatseekers Albums (Billboard)	1
US Top Rock Albums (Billboard)	31
