= Justin Hartley =

American actor (born 1977)

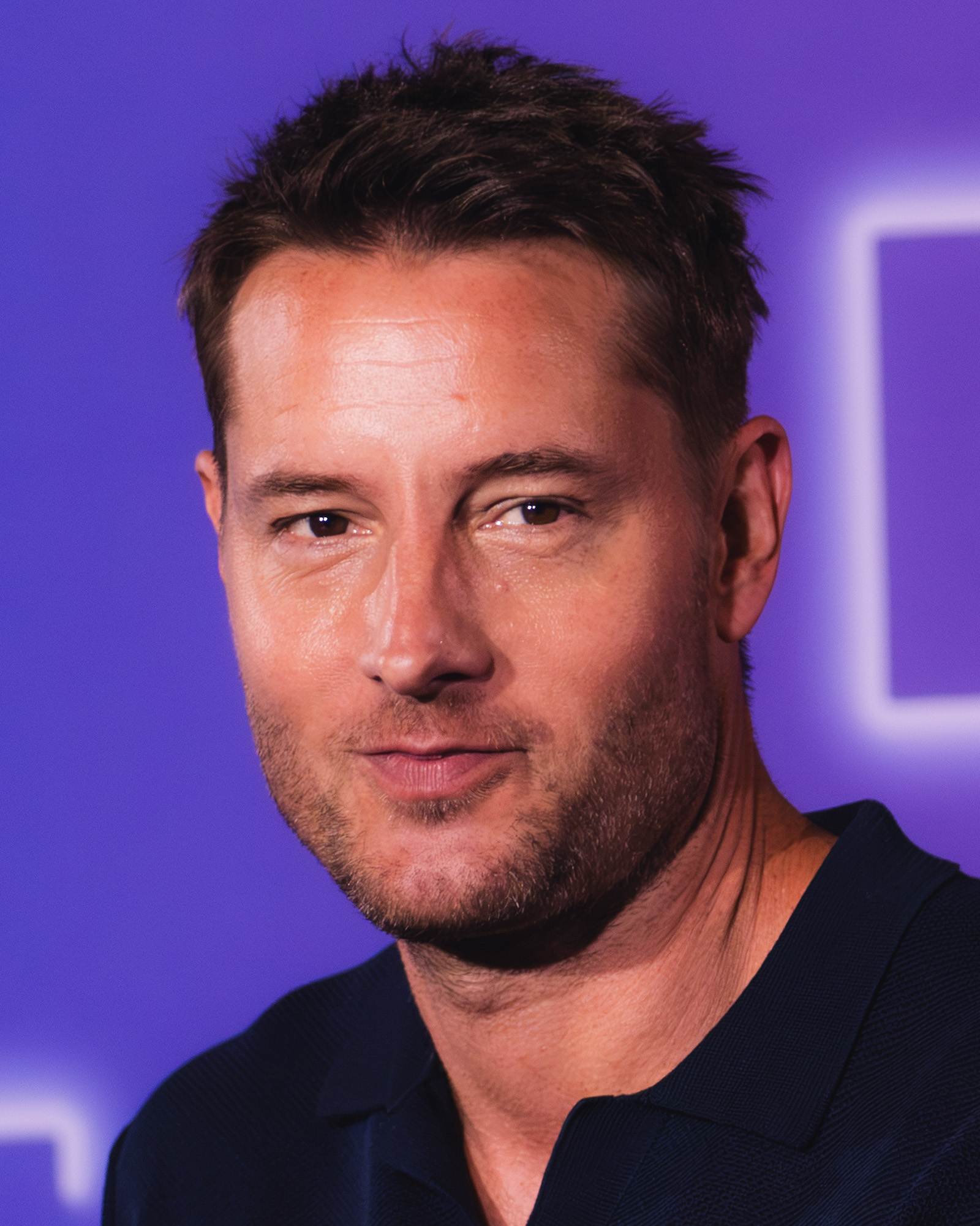
- Hartley in 2026
- Born: Justin Scott Hartley; January 29, 1977 (age 49); Knoxville, Illinois, U.S.
- Occupations: Actor; producer; director
- Years active: 2002–present
- Spouses: Lindsay Korman (m. 2004; div. 2012) Chrishell Stause (m. 2017; div. 2021) Sofia Pernas (m. 2021)
- Children: 1

Justin Scott Hartley (born January 29, 1977) is an American actor, television producer, and director. He has played Fox Crane on the NBC daytime soap opera Passions (2002–2006), Oliver Queen on the WB/CW television series Smallville (2006–2011), and Adam Newman on the CBS daytime soap opera The Young and the Restless (2014–2016) which earned him a Daytime Emmy nomination. He also had recurring roles in the third season of the television drama series Revenge (2013–2014) and in the final three seasons of the drama series Mistresses (2014–2016).

Hartley gained wider attention for starring as Kevin Pearson in the NBC drama series This Is Us, from 2016 to 2022, for which he was thrice nominated for the Critics' Choice Television Award for Best Supporting Actor in a Drama Series. He has since starred in the films A Bad Moms Christmas (2017) and The Noel Diary (2022). In 2024, he began starring in the CBS action drama series Tracker.

== Early life ==
Hartley was born on January 29, 1977, in Knoxville, Illinois, near Galesburg, where his family was living at the time of his birth. He was raised in the Chicago suburb of Orland Park, with his brother Nathan, and sisters Megan and Gabriela. After graduating from Carl Sandburg High School, he attended Southern Illinois University Carbondale and University of Illinois at Chicago where he majored in history and theater.

== Career ==
Justin Hartley portrayed Fox Crane on the NBC daytime soap opera Passions from 2002 to 2006. In 2006, he played the starring role as Aquaman in a television pilot for The CW titled Aquaman (or Mercy Reef), but it was not picked up as a series. Hartley did a seven-episode run as billionaire Oliver Queen on the CW series Smallville later that year. In 2008, he returned to Smallville as a regular cast member, following the departures of Kristin Kreuk, Michael Rosenbaum, Laura Vandervoort, and John Glover. Hartley also co-wrote the 2010 episode "Sacrifice" and directed the 2011 episode "Dominion". In 2008, he starred as Tom in the film Red Canyon, filmed in the badlands of Utah.

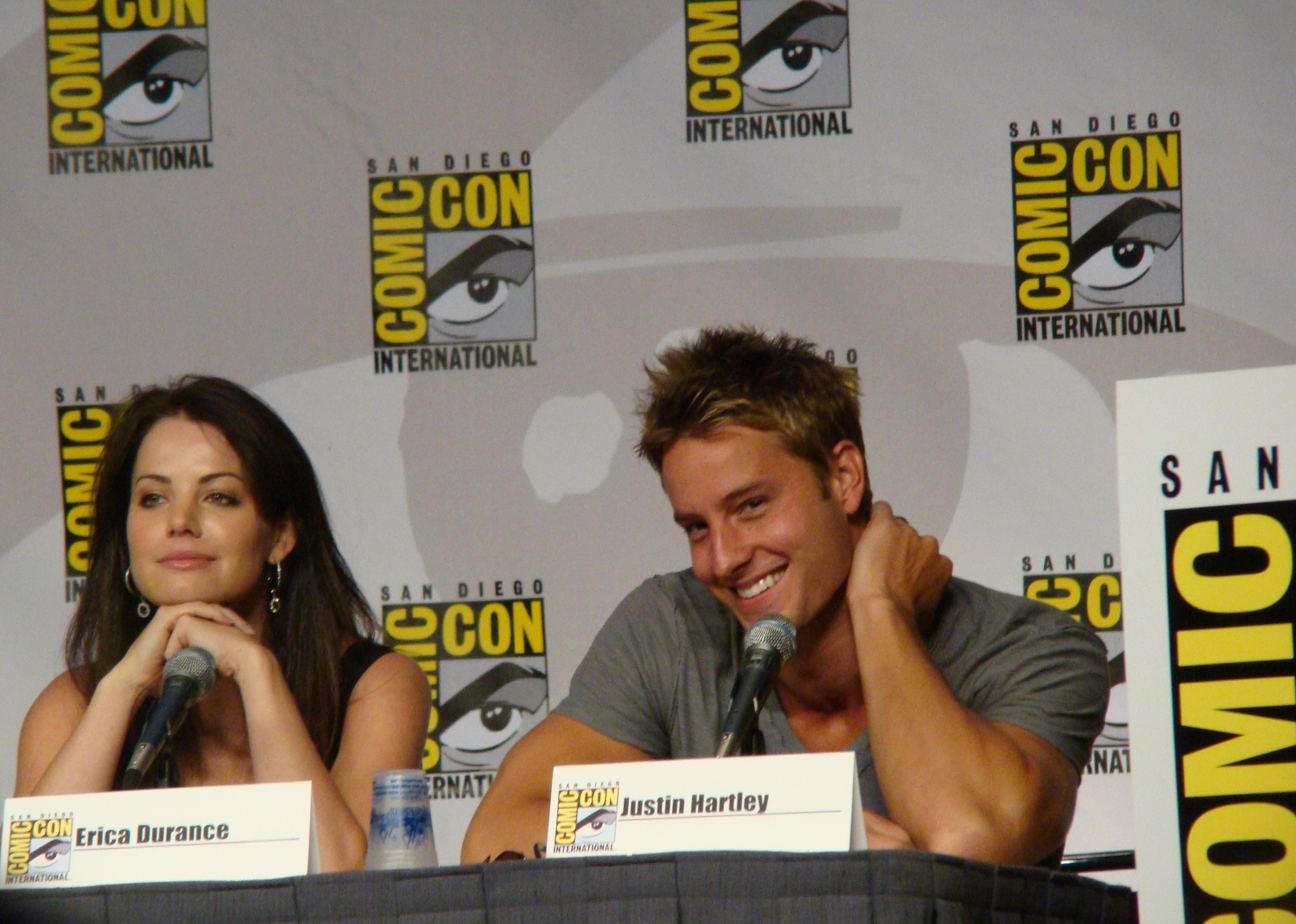
Erica Durance and Justin Hartley at 2010 San Diego Comic-Con

After Smallville, Hartley starred opposite Mamie Gummer in The CW comedy-drama Emily Owens, M.D., but the show was cancelled after one season. He also guest-starred on Chuck, Castle, and Hart of Dixie, and from 2013 to 2014, he had a recurring role as Victoria Grayson's (Madeleine Stowe) illegitimate son, Patrick Osbourne, on the ABC primetime soap opera Revenge. In February 2014, Hartley landed the lead role of Tim opposite Anna Camp in the ABC comedy pilot Damaged Goods, but the show was never picked up to series. In March 2014, he was cast in a recurring role in the second season of the ABC drama series Mistresses as plastic surgeon Scott Trosman, a love interest for Josslyn Carver (Jes Macallan). In November 2014, Hartley took over the role of Adam Newman on the CBS daytime soap opera The Young and the Restless, and played the role until September 2016.

In 2015, it was announced that Hartley was cast in a series regular role on the NBC drama series This Is Us, which debuted in September 2016. He and the cast won Outstanding Performance by an Ensemble in a Drama Series at the 24th Screen Actors Guild Awards. In 2017, he had a co-starring role in the comedy film A Bad Moms Christmas. In 2020, starred in the film The Hunt killed off near the beginning. In August 2020, Hartley signed on to star and executive produce a film adaptation of The Noel Diary, based on the novel of the same name. As of 2024 he stars in the series Tracker, of which he also is an executive producer.

== Personal life ==
In 2003 Hartley began dating his Passions co-star Lindsay Korman. After six months, the two became engaged on November 13, 2003. They married on May 1, 2004, in a small ceremony. On July 3, 2004, Korman gave birth to their daughter, Isabella Justice. On May 6, 2012, it was announced that Korman had filed for divorce in the Los Angeles County Superior Court, citing irreconcilable differences. They remain on amicable terms and share joint custody of their daughter.

In January 2014, actress Chrishell Stause's representation confirmed that Hartley and Stause were dating. In July 2016, they announced their engagement. They were married on October 28, 2017. Hartley and Stause resided in Valley Glen, Los Angeles. In November 2019, Hartley filed for divorce, citing irreconcilable differences. Stause filed for dissolution of the marriage in December 2019. The divorce was finalized on February 22, 2021.

Hartley married The Young and the Restless co-star Sofia Pernas in March 2021.

== Filmography ==
=== Film ===
Year	Title	Role	Notes
2005	Race You to the Bottom	Joe	
2008	Red Canyon	Tom	
2009	Spring Breakdown	Todd	
2009	A Way with Murder	Ted Rawlings	
2010	Scorpio Men on Prozac	Bill King	
2015	The Challenger	James "Mr. Undefeatable" Burchard	
2017	A Bad Moms Christmas	Ty Swindle	
2018	Another Time	Eric Laziter	Also executive producer
2019	Little	Garry Marshall	
2019	Jexi	Brody	
2020	The Hunt	Trucker	Uncredited
2021	The Exchange	Gary Rothbauer	
2021	Injustice	Kal-El / Clark Kent / Superman	Voice role
2022	Senior Year	Blaine Balbo	
2022	The Noel Diary	Jake Turner	
2022	A Lot of Nothing	Brian	
2025	Bride Hard	Chris	

=== Television ===
Year	Title	Role	Notes
2002–2006	Passions	Nicholas Foxworth "Fox" Crane	Series regular
2006	Aquaman	Arthur "A.C." Curry	Unsold television pilot
2006–2011	Smallville	Oliver Queen / Green Arrow	Recurring role (seasons 6–7); main role (seasons 8–10); 72 episodes Also director ("Dominion"); writer ("Sacrifice")
2007	CSI: NY	Elliott Bevins	Episode: "Heart of Glass"
2007	Cold Case	Mike Delaney	Episode: "Justice"
2008	Gemini Division	Nick Korda	Web series, 12 episodes
2009	Megafault	Dan Lane	Television film
2011	Chuck	Wesley Sneijder	Episode: "Chuck Versus the Bearded Bandit"
2012	Castle	Reggie Starr	Episode: "An Embarrassment of Bitches"
2012	Hart of Dixie	Jesse Kinsella	Episode: "Bachelorettes & Bullets"
2012–2013	Emily Owens, M.D.	Will Collins	Main role
2013	Melissa & Joey	Noah Butler	Episode: "Fast Times"
2013–2014	Revenge	Patrick Osbourne	Recurring role (season 3), 13 episodes
2014–2016	Mistresses	Scott Trosman	Recurring role (seasons 2–4)
2014–2016	The Young and the Restless	Adam Newman	Series regular
2016–2022	This Is Us	Kevin Pearson	Main role, occasional director
2019	Jane the Virgin	Himself	Episode: "Chapter Eighty-Nine"
2020	Robot Chicken	Ice Road Trucker, Glen's Classmate, Jeffrey's Brother	Voice role; episode: "Sundancer Craig in: 30% of the Way to Crying"
2022	Family Guy	Jamie, Jamie's Twin Brother	Voice role; episode: "Girlfriend, Eh?"
2022	Quantum Leap	Jake	Episode: "A Decent Proposal"
2024–present	Tracker	Colter Shaw	Main role; also executive producer

== Awards and nominations ==
Year	Award	Category	Work	Result	Ref.
2005	Soap Opera Digest Awards	Outstanding Younger Lead Actor	Passions	Nominated	
2005	Soap Opera Digest Awards	Favorite Triangle (shared with Lindsay Hartley and Brook Kerr)	Passions	Nominated	
2009	Streamy Awards	Best Male Actor in a Dramatic Web Series	Gemini Division	Nominated	
2016	Daytime Emmy Award	Outstanding Lead Actor in a Drama Series	The Young and the Restless	Nominated	
2018	Screen Actors Guild Awards	Outstanding Performance by an Ensemble in a Drama Series	This Is Us	Won	
2018	Critics' Choice Television Awards	Best Supporting Actor in a Drama Series	This Is Us	Nominated	
2019	Critics' Choice Television Awards	Best Supporting Actor in a Drama Series	This Is Us	Nominated	
2019	Screen Actors Guild Awards	Outstanding Performance by an Ensemble in a Drama Series	This Is Us	Won	
2019	Teen Choice Awards	Choice Drama TV Actor	This Is Us	Nominated	
2020	Critics' Choice Television Awards	Best Supporting Actor in a Drama Series	This Is Us	Nominated	
