= Girl in Room 13 (2022 film) =

- Genre: Social problem film Crime drama
- Written by: Maria Nation
- Directed by: Elisabeth Röhm
- Starring: Anne Heche; Larissa Dias; Max Montesi; Matt Hamilton
- Music by: Mario Vaira
- Countries of origin: United States, Canada
- Original language: English

Production
- Executive producers: Stacy Mandelberg; Timothy O. Johnson; Yvonne Chotzen
- Producer: Navid Soofi
- Cinematography: Andy Hodgson
- Editor: Devin Taylor
- Running time: 88 minutes
- Production companies: Johnson Production Group; Motel Productions Inc.

Original release
- Network: Lifetime Television
- Release: September 17, 2022

Girl in Room 13 is a television movie that premiered on Lifetime on September 17, 2022. Part of Lifetime's Ripped from the Headlines series of movies, it is about human trafficking and opioid addiction. The film stars Anne Heche, who completed production prior to her death. Heche appears in the film posthumously at the time of broadcast. The film is dedicated to her memory. It was directed by Elisabeth Rohm, who starred in several Lifetime movies and portrayed ADA Serena Southerlyn for three and a half seasons on Law & Order.

The film has played a role in conspiracy theories that arose after Heche's accidental death, falsely claiming that the film was about Jeffrey Epstein's sex trafficking ring and that Heche's car accident was actually an assassination by figures involved in the trafficking ring who wanted to silence Heche.

== Plot ==
While recovering from a swimming injury, Grace (Larissa Dias) becomes addicted to opioids, and begins obtaining them illegally. She is ready to end her addiction with the help of her mother, Janie (Anne Heche), but is kidnapped by her drug dealer ex-boyfriend Richie (Max Montesi), who holds her prisoner in a motel room (numbered Room 13) to break her down and sell her into human trafficking. The story centers on Janie's search for her missing daughter and her fights with the police to get them to take the case seriously.

== Cast ==
Cast with named characters, in credits order:

- Anne Heche as Janie
- Larissa Dias as Grace
- Max Montesi as Richie
- Matt Hamilton as Burt
- Saskia Wedding as Red
- Brian Cyburt as Rex
- Erika Bruci as Toni
- Rhona Rees as L'Ryane
- Taya Seaton as Ivy
- Jason Deline as Officer Munson
- William Matzhold as Cray
- Brahm Taylor as Derek
- Madonna Gonzalez as Beth
- Sarah Peguero as Rosa
- Harmony Yen as Li

== See also ==
- Gracie's Choice
- Girl Fight
- Polaris Project
