= Wild Belle =

American band

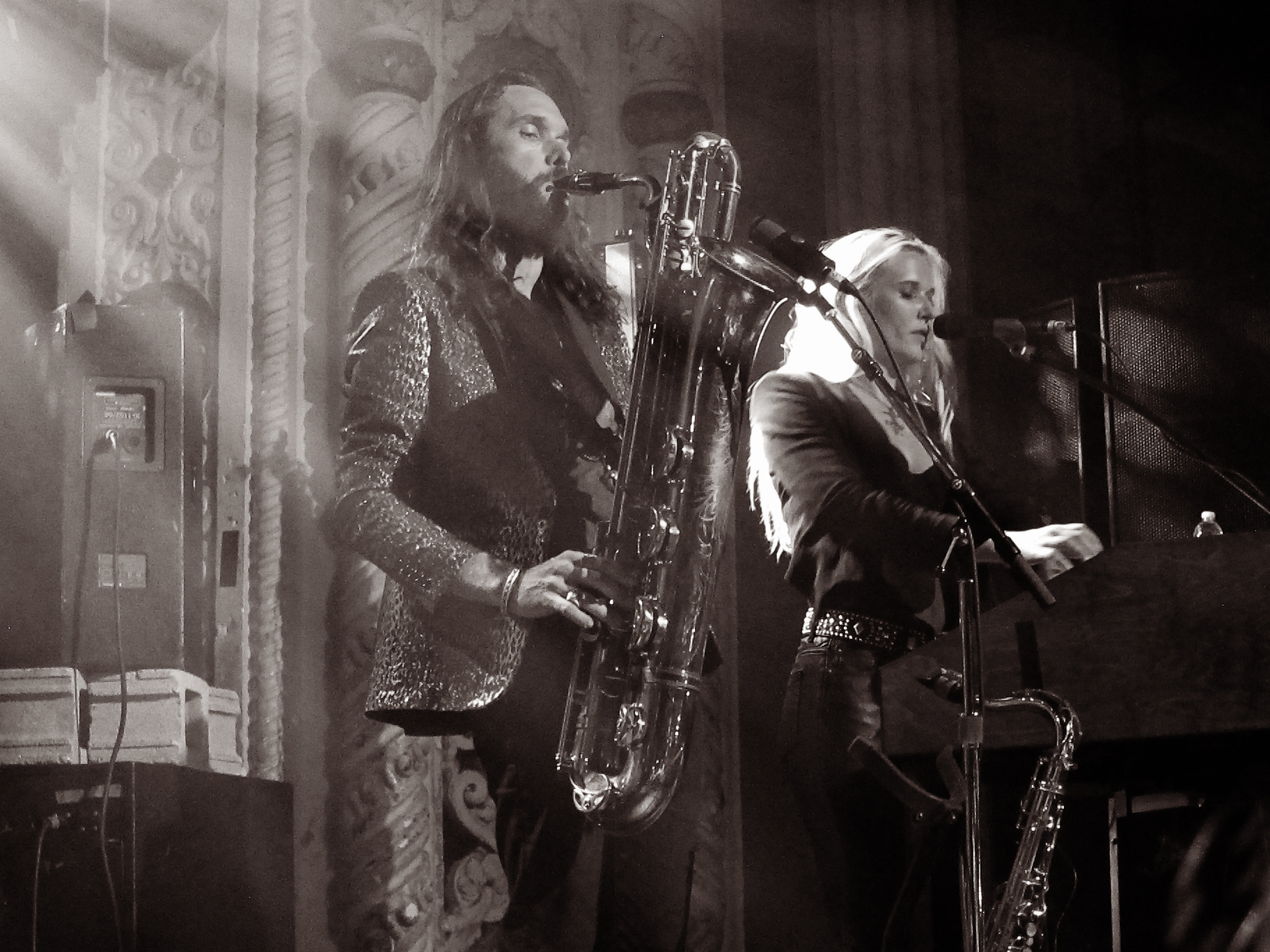
- Wild Belle performing in 2016

Background information
- Origin: Chicago, Illinois, U.S.
- Genres: Psychedelic pop; ska; reggae; funk; rock; jazz
- Years active: 2011–present
- Label: Columbia
- Members: Elliot Bergman; Natalie Bergman
- Website: www.wildbelle.com

Wild Belle is an American band composed of siblings Elliot Bergman and Natalie Bergman. They appeared on Conan on November 26, 2012. Their debut album, Isles, was released by Columbia Records on March 12, 2013. They have released three songs from the album: "Keep You" in February, "Backslider", and "It's Too Late". Their song "Shine" was featured on the soundtrack of the 2013 movie The Way, Way Back and in Grey's Anatomy season 9, episode 13. Their song "Keep You" was played in the movie Pitch Perfect and in The Vampire Diaries season 4, episode 3. In 2015 Wild Belle worked with Diplo and DJEMBA DJEMBA to write "Be Together", which is the first track off Major Lazer's third album Peace Is the Mission. The song is about a potential, but unlikely relationship. The film clip for "Be Together" depicts a widow and her partner's funeral, with flash backs to the day he dies in a motorcycle accident.

== Background ==
Elliot and Natalie Bergman are two of four children born to investment banker Judson Bergman and writer and literary scholar Susan Bergman (née Heche). They were raised in a musical household, "full of jazz and James Brown". Elliot, the older sibling, is a multi-instrumentalist who studied at the University of Michigan where he started an Afrobeat band called Nomo. His sister Natalie, eight years younger, started performing with Nomo when she was sixteen, playing tambourine and singing backing vocals.

The two siblings initially started writing songs together almost by chance. During Summer 2010, Elliot Bergman had been building and recording electric kalimbas in Brooklyn, when label-mate Shawn Lee asked him to send over a kalimba track for his new album. Lee, a producer and multi-instrumentalist based in London, added drums, steel drums and bass, and sent the new recording back to Bergman. When Bergman's sister, Natalie, heard the instrumental destined for Shawn's album, she decided to add a vocal part. She reportedly stayed up all night writing the tune, and recorded the vocals in GarageBand. The resulting song, "Upside Down", was released by Nomo as one of their few tracks to feature vocals. Elliott and Natalie then decided to form their own musical project, and chose the name Wild Belle, with "Belle" referring to Natalie.

== Career ==
=== 2013: Isles ===
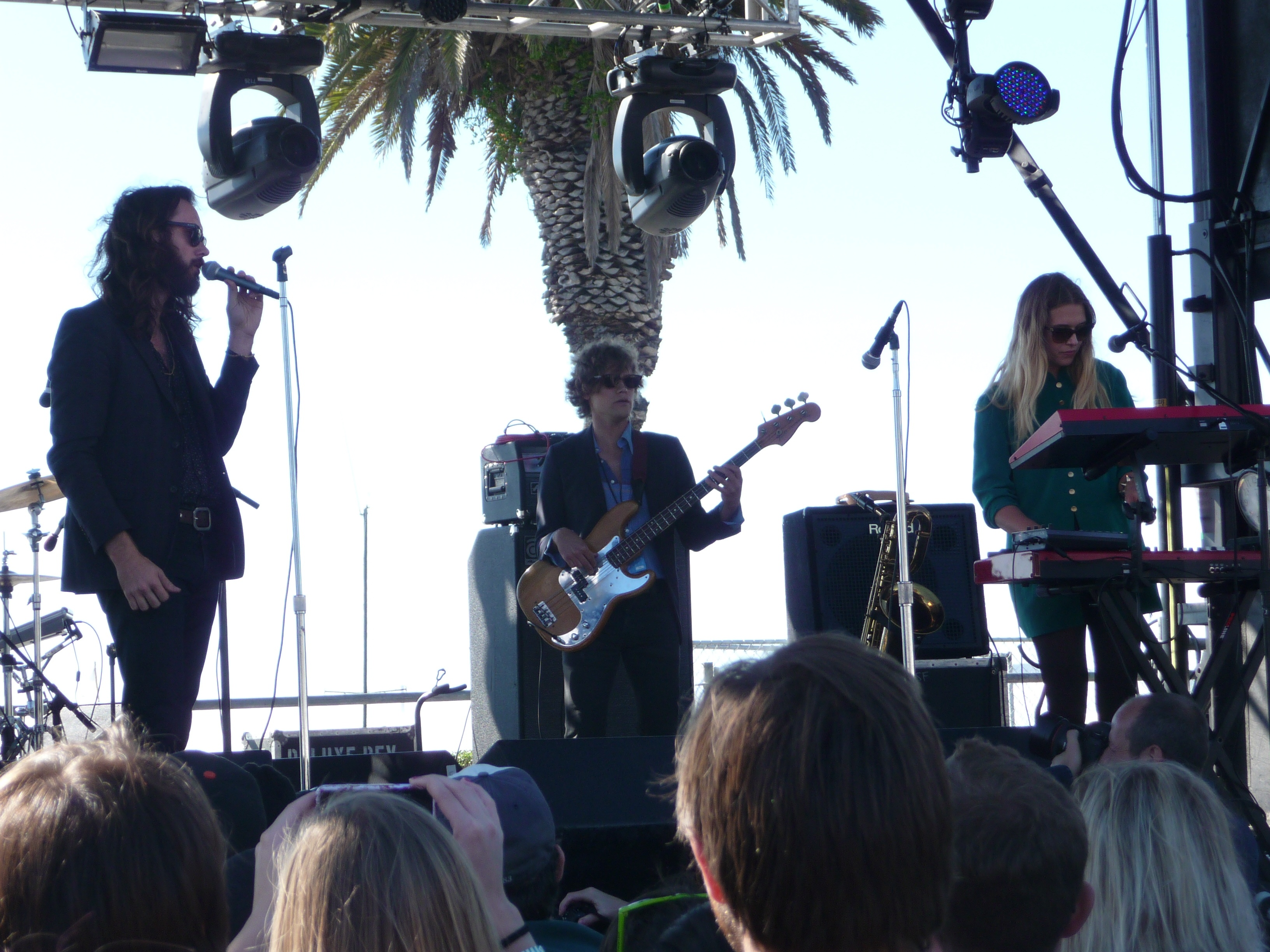
Wild Belle in 2012

Their debut album, entitled Isles, was released on March 12, 2013. It received its title due to every track "resembling its own island", drawing in influences from reggae, soul, and jazz music.

=== 2015–2018: Dreamland ===
On August 2, 2015 during an interview with radio station WXRT, they announced that their second studio album would be titled Dreamland. The album was released on April 15, 2016. The lead single from Dreamland, "Giving Up on You" was released on September 16, 2015.

=== 2019–present: Everybody One of a Kind ===
On January 23, the group premiered on KCRW's Morning Becomes Eclectic and shared the video of the lead single "Mockingbird" off their upcoming album.

The second single "Have You Both" was released on February 14.

The duo released their third single "Rocksteady" on March 8 as they announced that their third album Everybody One Of A Kind will be released on March 22.

In 2021, Natalie Bergman began releasing music as a solo artist. It is uncertain if Wild Belle will continue as a group as no announcements have been made in several years.

== Discography ==
=== Albums ===
| Title | Release details |
|---|---|
| Isles | Released: March 12, 2013; Label: Columbia; Formats: LP, CD, digital download, streaming |
| Dreamland | Released: April 15, 2016; Label: Columbia; Formats: LP, CD, digital download, streaming |
| Everybody One of a Kind | Released: March 22, 2019; Label: Love Tone; Formats: LP, CD, digital download, streaming |

=== EPs ===
- It's Too Late EP (2012)
- Wild Belle (2013)
- Isles (Remix EP) (2013)

=== Singles ===
- "Keep You" (2010)
- "It's Too Late" (2012)
- "Another Girl" (2013)
- "Giving Up On You" (2015)
- "Giving Up On You - Ticklah Remix" (2015)
- "Throw Down Your Guns" (2016)
- "Throw Down Your Guns - Dub" (2016)
- "Our Love Will Survive" (2016)
- "Untamed Heart / Morphine Dreamer" (non-album single; 2017)
- "Hurricane / Paralyzed" (non-album single; 2017)
- "Mockingbird" (2019)
- "Have You Both" (2019)
- "Rocksteady" (2019)
