= Dreamland (Wild Belle album) =

Studio album by Wild Belle
- Released: April 15, 2016
- Length: 38:49
- Label: Columbia
- Producers: Elliot Bergman; Pat Carney; Doc McKinney; Tim Pagnotta; Dave Sitek; Boaz van de Beatz

Wild Belle chronology
Isles (2013)	Dreamland (2016)	Everybody One of a Kind (2019)

Singles from Dreamland
- 1. "Giving Up on You" Released: December 16, 2015; 2. "Throw Down Your Guns" Released: January 8, 2016; 3. "Our Love Will Survive" Released: March 26, 2016

Dreamland is the second studio album by the American brother/sister duo Wild Belle. It was released on April 15, 2016, by Columbia Records. The album is set of moody, groove-oriented songs with a deeper emotional impact and more influenced in their laid-back tropical vibe, supposedly due to the lead singer Natalie Bergman ending a toxic relationship during the record process.

== Reception ==
Professional ratings
Review scores
Source	Rating
AllMusic	3.5/5 stars
Now	3/5 Ns
Renowned for Sound	4/5 stars

The album received 4 out of 5 stars by Renowned for Sound. Atwood Magazine rated the album 7.1 on a 10-point scale. Matt Collar of AllMusic gave the album a rating of 3.5 out of 5 stars. Now rated the album 3 out of 5 stars.

== Track listing ==
No.	Title	Writer(s)	Length
1.	"Mississippi River"	Elliot Bergman, Natalie Bergman	3:02
2.	"Losing You"	E. Bergman, N. Bergman, Doc McKinney	3:03
3.	"Dreamland"	E. Bergman, N. Bergman, D. McKinney	3:39
4.	"Coyotes"	E. Bergman, N. Bergman	3:27
5.	"Cannonball"	E. Bergman, N. Bergman	3:41
6.	"Giving Up on You"	E. Bergman, N. Bergman, Dave Sitek	3:26
7.	"It Was You (Baby Come Back to Me)"	E. Bergman, N. Bergman, D. McKinney	4:13
8.	"Throw Down Your Guns"	E. Bergman, N. Bergman, Tim Pagnotta	3:54
9.	"The One That Got Away"	E. Bergman, N. Bergman	3:33
10.	"Our Love Will Survive"	E. Bergman, N. Bergman, Boaz van de Beatz	2:52
11.	"Rock and Roll Angel"	E. Bergman, N. Bergman, D. McKinney	3:59
Total length:			38:49
