= The Early Fears =

1994 collection of fantasy and horror short stories by Robert Bloch

- Dust-jacket from the first edition.
- Author: Robert Bloch
- Cover artist: Jon Arfstrom
- Language: English
- Genre: Fantasy, horror
- Publisher: Fedogan & Bremer
- Publication date: 1994
- Publication place: United States
- Media type: Print (hardback)
- Pages: ix, 515
- ISBN: 1-878252-12-7
- OCLC: 31163309

The Early Fears is a collection of fantasy and horror short stories by American writer Robert Bloch. It was released in 1994 by Fedogan & Bremer in an edition of 2,400 copies, of which 100 were signed by the author. The collection reprints the stories from Bloch's two earlier collections published by Arkham House, The Opener of the Way and Pleasant Dreams: Nightmares with three additional stories. The stories originally appeared in the magazines Unknown, Weird Tales, Amazing Stories, Strange Stories, Fantasy and Science Fiction, Beyond Fantasy Fiction, Fantastic, Imagination and Swank. The collection includes Bloch's 1959 Hugo Award winning story, "That Hell-Bound Train."

== Contents ==
- "The View from 1993"
- "The Cloak"
- "Beetles"
- "The Fiddler’s Fee"
- "The Mannikin"
- "The Strange Flight of Richard Clayton"
- "Yours Truly, Jack the Ripper"
- "The Seal of the Satyr"
- "The Dark Demon"
- "The Faceless God"
- "House of the Hatchet"
- "The Opener of the Way"
- "Return to the Sabbath"
- "The Mandarin’s Canaries"
- "Waxworks"
- "The Feast in the Abbey"
- "Slave of the Flames"
- "The Shambler from the Stars"
- "Mother of Serpents"
- "The Secret of Sebek"
- "The Eyes of the Mummy"
- "One Way to Mars"
- "Sweets to the Sweet"
- "The Dream Makers"
- "The Sorcerer’s Apprentice"
- "I Kiss Your Shadow"
- "Mr. Steinway"
- "The Proper Spirit"
- "Catnip"
- "The Cheaters"
- "Hungarian Rhapsody"
- "The Light-House" (with Edgar Allan Poe)
- "The Hungry House"
- "Sleeping Beauty"
- "Sweet Sixteen"
- "That Hell-Bound Train"
- "Enoch"
- "The Bedposts of Life"
- "The Grab Bag" (with Henry Kuttner)
- "The Creative Urge"
