= Psychological horror =

Narrative subgenre

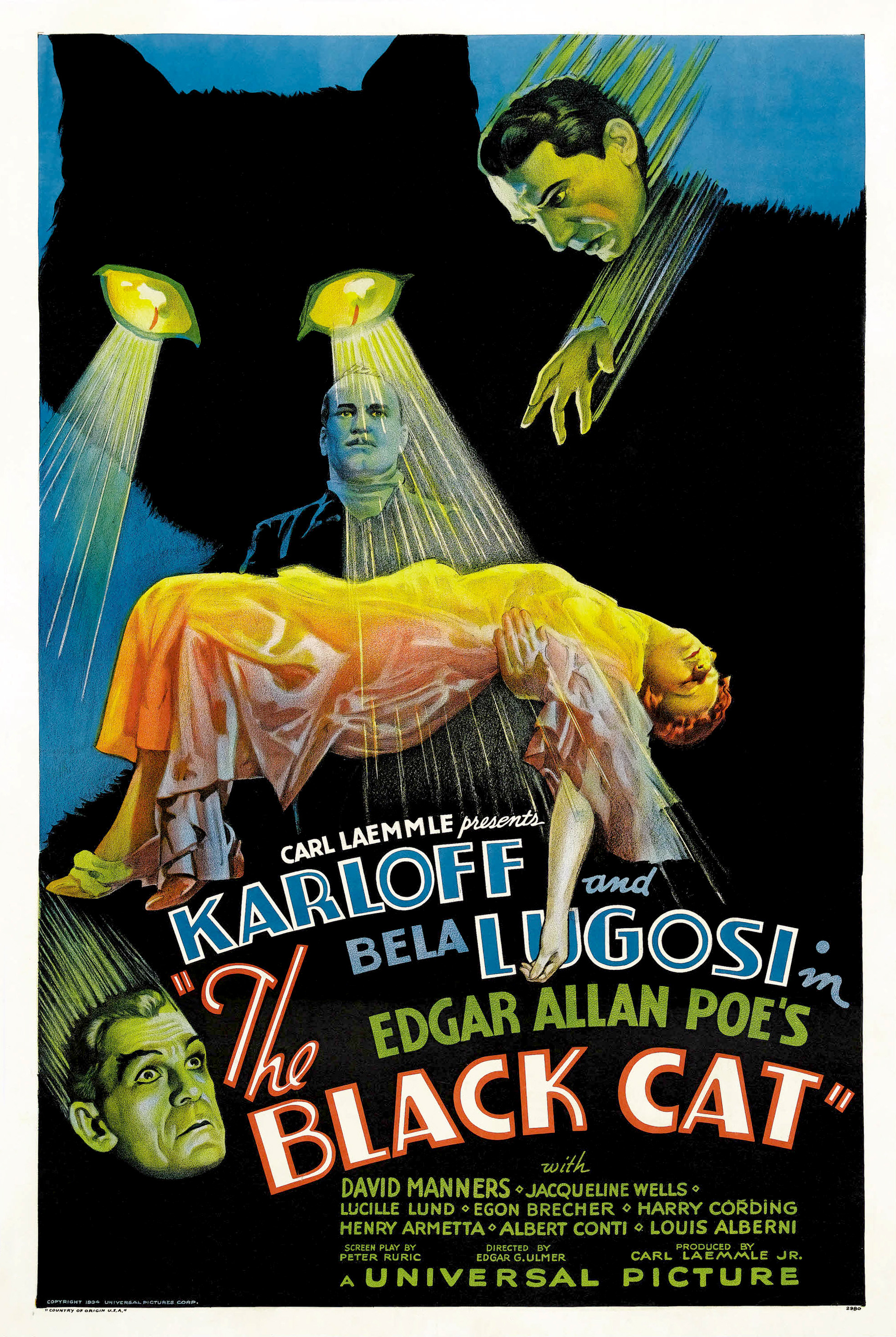
Poster for the American psychological horror film The Black Cat (1934)

Psychological horror is a subgenre of horror and psychological fiction with a particular focus on mental, emotional, and psychological states to frighten, disturb, or unsettle its audience. The subgenre frequently overlaps with the related subgenre of psychological thriller, and often uses mystery elements and characters with unstable, unreliable, or disturbed psychological states to enhance the suspense, horror, drama, tension, and paranoia of the setting and plot and to provide an overall creepy, unpleasant, unsettling, or distressing atmosphere.

== Characteristics ==
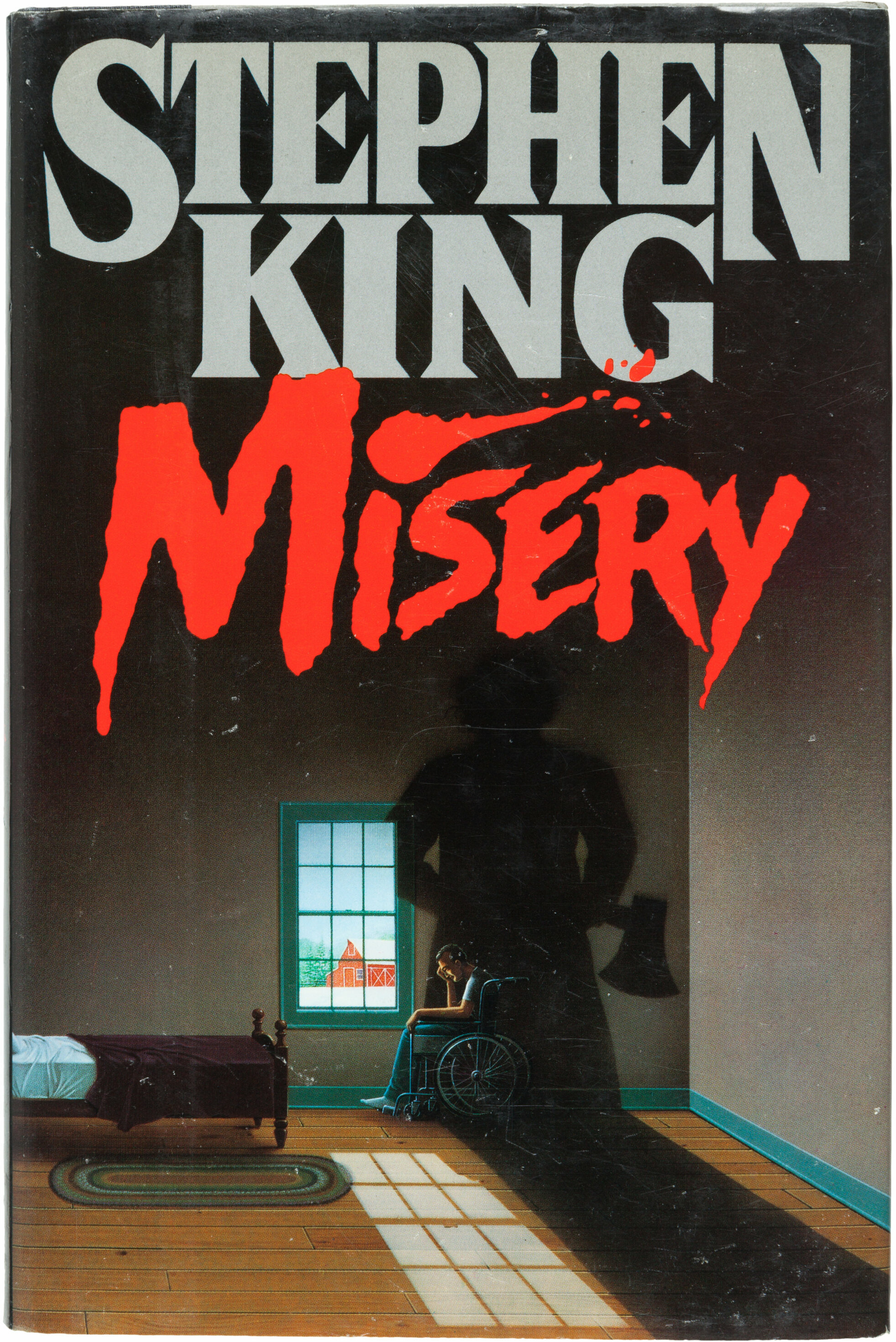
A book cover of Misery, the 1987 psychological horror novel by Stephen King

Traditionally, psychological horror was defined by its portrayal of characters experiencing psychological instability or extreme emotional distress, where the eerie atmosphere was a direct reflection of the character's internal state. Today, however, the genre is no longer confined to a character’s psyche; for instance, Ju-On: The Grudge is frequently cited as a hallmark of psychological horror within the J-horror tradition.

Psychological horror usually aims to create discomfort or dread by exposing common or universal psychological and emotional vulnerabilities/fears and revealing the darker parts of the human psyche that most people may repress or deny. This idea is referred to in analytical psychology as the archetypal shadow characteristics: suspicion, distrust, self-doubt, and paranoia of others, themselves, and the world.

The genre sometimes seeks to challenge or confuse the audience's grasp of the narrative or plot by focusing on characters who are themselves unsure of or doubting their own perceptions of reality or questioning their own sanity. Characters' perceptions of their surroundings or situations may indeed be distorted or subject to delusions, outside manipulation or gaslighting by other characters; emotional disturbances or trauma; and even hallucinations or mental disorders. Additionally, restricting the characters' and audience's view of potential danger through strategic lighting and visual obstructions—like in Bird Box—can heighten suspense and engage the imagination, leaving much of the threat unseen.

In many cases, and in a similar way as the overlapping genre of psychological thriller, psychological horror may deploy an unreliable narrator or imply that aspects of the story are being perceived inaccurately by a protagonist, thus confusing or unsettling the audience and setting up an ominous or disturbing overarching tone. In other cases, the narrator or protagonist may be reliable or ostensibly mentally stable but is placed in a situation involving another character or characters who are psychologically, mentally, or emotionally disturbed. Thus, elements of psychological horror focus on mental conflicts. These become important as the characters face perverse situations, sometimes involving the supernatural, immorality, murder, and conspiracies. While other horror media emphasize fantastical situations such as attacks by monsters, psychological horror tends to keep the monsters hidden and to involve situations more grounded on artistic realism.

Plot twists are a frequently used device. Characters commonly face internal battles with subconscious desires such as romantic lust and the desire for petty revenge. In contrast, splatter fiction and monster movies often focuses on a bizarre, alien evil to which the average viewer cannot easily relate. However, at times, the psychological horror and splatter subgenres overlap, such as in the French horror film High Tension.

In the modern era, however, psychological horror is no longer synonymous with the absence of monsters. The source of terror can be either endogenous (internal) or exogenous (external), as seen in the Cthulhu Mythos, the SCP Foundation, and various supernatural works. Influenced by global cultural exchange and a surge in creative experimentation, the contemporary definition has shifted toward the psychological impact on the audience or player. It generally excludes subgenres that prioritize physical threats or bodily harm from tangible monsters, such as traditional creature features or slashers. Consequently, the level of dread one experiences is often deeply subjective and shaped by their own cultural background.

== Psychological fascination of psychological horror ==
Fascination with horror films lies in the unreasonable, irrational, and impossible. Jung and Nietzsche's theories exemplify humans need to escape the real world and live in a sublime space where anything is possible. Horror allows the watcher to escape mundane conventional life and express the inner workings of their irrational thoughts. H.P. Lovecraft's explanation for the fascination with horror stems from a lack of understanding of humanity's place in the universe and instincts that may remain outside of conscious awareness. Horror serves as a reminder of these themes. Psychological horror further encourages confrontation with personal fears. Unseen aspects of human nature and basic impulses may drive interest in stimuli that evoke such reactions.

Psychological horror not only elicits fear, anxiety, and disgust but it also has the capacity to foster empathy in audiences. The genre allows audiences to navigate the complexities of human experiences that prompt viewers to connect with characters confronting conflict. Modern research reveals the relationship between empathy and fear or the lack thereof with interest in horror. Research shows that the effects of psychological horror affects females more than males. A current hypothesis for this difference between the genders is that it relates to social expectations and the gender roles we are exposed to during childhood. As a result of the lack of cross-cultural research on the psychological effects of horror, one hypothesis is that individual cultures develop their own unique sense of horror, based in their cultural experiences.

Discourse on more of the positive effects of psychological horror also point to it being a vessel for catharsis. Similar to how a sad song might help a listener through a difficult time by helping them purge their emotions to uncover psychological relief, horror can provide a similar route to cathartic experiences. According to Geraci et al., "Strange things—the monstrous or weird —fascinate us because they evoke quasi-religious dread and desire, but we also pursue that which disturbs us because we desire to control it. Through deliberate exposure to the things we fear, we acclimate ourselves to them." Humans have a tendency to exhibit a cognitive bias called the negativity bias, indicating humans are more likely to identify and dwell on negative aspects of our environments than positive ones, even if they both occur in the same magnitude. Evolutionarily, this helps explain why people may be quicker to interpret certain stimuli or changes in the environment as threatening rather than beneficial. This negativity bias also helps account for morbid curiosity and why people consume and enjoy horror media. Freud also points to his observations that children seem to repeatedly engage in the same unpleasurable experience in order to overcome it. It is only after these adverse experiences that psychological comfort arises.

== Tools of psychological horror ==
=== Lighting and shadows ===
Hitchcock's Rear Window used light and deliberate shadows to incite suspense in the viewer. Suspense is a fundamental part of Hitchcockian horror. The use of shadows through light to cover up information results in a subtle escalation of suspense and horror of what can not be seen. Hitchcock's Rear Window places the main character as the primary information source for the viewer; their confusion is pervasive. The viewer lacks an omniscient understanding of events, resulting in a suspenseful and slow, then explosive, revelation. Shadows hide events or truths yet to be revealed, sometimes foreshadow events, and notify the viewer to hidden truths, resulting in suspense and the self reflection of known truths by the viewer. Light is used as a metaphor for what is known and can be seen, in the light, and what is unknown, in the shadows. Half illumination can be used to express a duality of emotions and uncertainty. The use of a burning cigarette, or a faint light in a sea of darkness, is enough to inform the viewer that something or someone is there, but reveals nothing else, manipulating the viewers fears of what could be.

=== Sound and music ===
Studies by Thayer and Ellison in the 1980s studied the effects of different types of music layered on top of stressful visual stimuli using dermal electromagnetism to capture information about physiological stimulation while watching and listening. They found that when stressful music and composition was laid over top stressful images, the psychological response was greater than when watching the same visual stimuli with non-stressful sound. Music with a positive tone resulted in viewers perceiving simultaneous visual stimuli as positive, and when negative tones are used viewers perceive visual stimuli as negative or more threatening.

They made three hypotheses and were able to prove two with their research:

1. The use of equally stressful sounds and music over stressful imagery increased the psychological response in viewers in comparison to the same imagery without sound.
2. Where sound and music are placed in relation to a stressful visual stimuli affects the psychological response in viewers. This could not be totally proven, as when sound and music are incongruent with visual stimuli the electromagnetic response was heightened without alleviation in moments of non stress.
3. Sound and music placement can manipulate the viewer into believing a stressful moment is about to happen or has ended, when music is used in opposition to human expectation it can increase stress in the viewer when the expectation the music created doesn't happen visually.

When following a character in a movie or show, the music exemplifies the emotion of the character, allowing the viewer to feel what the character feels, creating a synergy between character and viewer. The addition of music breathes more depth into emotional responses that visual stimuli can not accomplish on its own. Music can subconsciously influence the viewer, further intertwining them emotionally with what they are watching, forcing them to feel more deeply the emotion they are feeling from watching.

While sound design is deliberately crafted in the horror genre to evoke an emotional response, the absence of sound can be equally effective. Soundtracks are utilized to build tension or accent a startling event, like a jump scare. However, in the film A Quiet Place, much of what builds suspense is the sparse, muted sound design. Films with minimalist, limited soundtracks leave audiences unable to predict coming scenes and often lead to more pronounced emotional responses when a sound is added.

== Novels ==
The novels The Golem by Gustav Meyrink, The Silence of the Lambs by Thomas Harris, Robert Bloch novels such as Psycho and American Gothic, Stephen King novels such as Carrie, Misery, The Girl Who Loved Tom Gordon, The Shining, William Golding's Lord of the Flies and Koji Suzuki's novel Ring are some examples of psychological horror. Shirley Jackson's We Have Always Lived in the Castle is often viewed as one of the best examples of psychological horror in fiction.

== Films ==
Bill Gibron of PopMatters declared a mixed definition of the psychological horror film, ranging from definitions of 'anything that created a sense of disquiet or apprehension', to a film where an audience's mind makes up what was not directly displayed visually. Gibron concluded it as a "clouded gray area between all out splatter and a trip through a cinematic dark ride."

Academics and historians have stated different origin periods to the psychological horror film. Historian David J. Skal described The Black Cat (1934) as "being called the first psychological horror movie in America." Academic Susan Hayward described them as a post-World War II phenomenon and giving examples of psychological horror films as Psycho (1960) and Peeping Tom (1960). Hayward continued that the psychological horror films and slasher films are both interchangeable terms with "horror-thrillers".

Hayward said the genre resembled the slasher film with both being "vicious normalizing of misogyny". She wrote that in both film genres, the male had a dependence on the female for a sense of identity derived from his difference from her, and often killed them with items like knives or chainsaws.

== Video games ==
Psychological horror video games are a subgenre of horror video games. While such games may be based on any style of gameplay, they are generally more exploratory and "seek to instigate a sense of doubt about what might really be happening" in the player. Phantasmagoria (1995), D (1995), Corpse Party (1996) and Silent Hill (1999) are considered some of the first psychological horror games. Sometimes, psychological horror games will simulate crashes, file corruptions, and various other errors, such as the 2017 visual novel Doki Doki Literature Club!.

Aligning with Freud's observations of children's repeated engagement with unpleasurable experiences, researchers have found that many people derive similar emotions and experiences when engaging in horror video games. Scary, disturbing, and unsettling characters in horror media tend to be heightened and exaggerated personifications of real anxieties and fears. It is human nature to be attracted to things that elicit fear and to seek to overcome those fears as it allows individuals to gain "temporary victory over ourselves." Horror video games elicit a consistent level of anxiety in players and allow them to act on it. To deal with the threat of horror in the game, players are driven to strengthen and protect their characters, and their success translates to both achievement and a cathartic experience having overcome their fears and anxieties. Research also indicates that some players noted diminished fear in their real lives after playing horror video games.

== See also ==
- Art horror
- Body horror
- Conte cruel
- Gothic fiction
- Hitchcockian
- Horror and terror
- Horror-of-personality
- Lovecraftian horror
- Paranoid fiction
- Psycho-biddy
- Social thriller

== Bibliography ==
- Gibron, Bill (July 31, 2013). "What Exactly is a "Psychological" Horror Film?". PopMatters. Archived from the original on August 17, 2018.
- Hayward, Susan (2001) [2000]. Cinema Studies: The Key Concepts (2nd ed.). Routledge. ISBN 0-415-22739-9.
- Reid, Robin Anne (2009). Women in Science Fiction and Fantasy: Overviews. ABC-CLIO. ISBN 978-0313335914.
- Skal, David J. (2001). The Monster Show: A Cultural History of Horror. Farrar, Straus and Giroux. ISBN 0571199968.
