= Pleasant Dreams: Nightmares =

1960 collection of fantasy and horror short stories by Robert Bloch

- Jacket illustration by Gary Gore.
- Author: Robert Bloch
- Cover artist: Gary Gore
- Language: English
- Genre: Fantasy, horror
- Publisher: Arkham House
- Publication date: 1960
- Publication place: United States
- Media type: Print (hardback)
- Pages: 233

Pleasant Dreams: Nightmares is a collection of fantasy and horror short stories by American writer Robert Bloch. It was released in 1960 and was the author's second book published by Arkham House. It was released in an edition of 2,060 copies.

The stories originally appeared in several magazines between 1946 and 1958. The collection includes Bloch's 1959 Hugo Award winning story, "That Hell-Bound Train".

== Contents ==
Pleasant Dreams: Nightmares contains the following tales:

1. "Sweets to the Sweet"
2. "The Dream-Makers"
3. "The Sorcerer's Apprentice"
4. "I Kiss Your Shadow"
5. "Mr. Steinway"
6. "The Proper Spirit"
7. "Catnip"
8. "The Cheaters"
9. "Hungarian Rhapsody"
10. "The Lighthouse" (with Edgar Allan Poe)
11. "The Hungry House"
12. "The Sleeping Beauty"
13. "Sweet Sixteen"
14. "That Hell-Bound Train"
15. "Enoch"

== Sources ==
- Jaffery, Sheldon (1989). The Arkham House Companion. Mercer Island, WA: Starmont House, Inc. p. 54. ISBN 1-55742-005-X.
- Chalker, Jack L.; Mark Owings (1998). The Science-Fantasy Publishers: A Bibliographic History, 1923-1998. Westminster, MD and Baltimore: Mirage Press, Ltd. p. 37.
- Joshi, S.T. (1999). Sixty Years of Arkham House: A History and Bibliography. Sauk City, WI: Arkham House. pp. 68–69. ISBN 0-87054-176-5.
- Nielsen, Leon (2004). Arkham House Books: A Collector's Guide. Jefferson, NC and London: McFarland & Company, Inc. p. 80. ISBN 0-7864-1785-4.
