= Night of the Ripper =

1984 novel by Robert Bloch

- First edition
- Author: Robert Bloch
- Language: English
- Genre: Crime
- Publisher: Doubleday
- Publication date: 1984
- Publication place: United States
- Media type: Print (hardcover)
- Pages: 227 (first edition hardcover)
- ISBN: 978-0-385-19422-8
- Preceded by: Psycho II
- Followed by: Lori

Night of the Ripper is a 1984 novel written by American writer Robert Bloch.

== Plot ==
The story is set during the reign of Queen Victoria and follows the investigation of Inspector Abberline in attempting to apprehend Jack the Ripper and includes some characters based on real-life Victorians such as Sir Arthur Conan Doyle in the storyline.
