= The Shambler from the Stars =

Horror story written by Robert Bloch

"The Shambler from the Stars" is a horror short story by American writer Robert Bloch, first published in the September 1935 issue of Weird Tales.

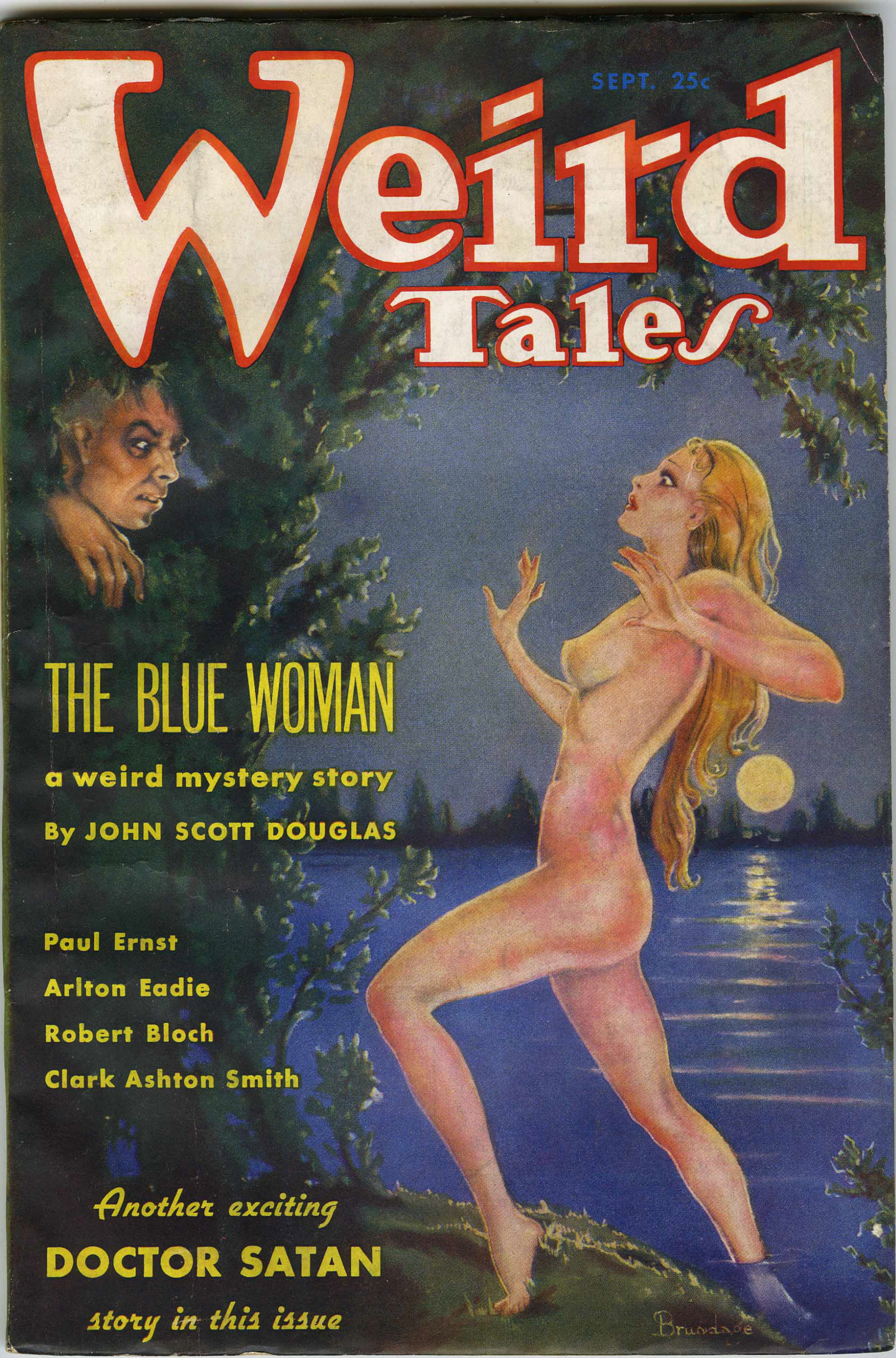
September 1935 issue of Weird Tales; cover art by Margaret Brundage

It was later included as part of his first published book, The Opener of the Way (1945), and his 1994 collection The Early Fears. A Cthulhu Mythos tale, it introduced the forbidden tome De Vermis Mysteriis (Mysteries of the Worm). Later on in 1936, Lovecraft wrote the short story "The Haunter of the Dark" as a sequel and dedicated it to Bloch. Eventually, in 1950, Bloch wrote his own sequel "The Shadow from the Steeple".

== Plot summary ==
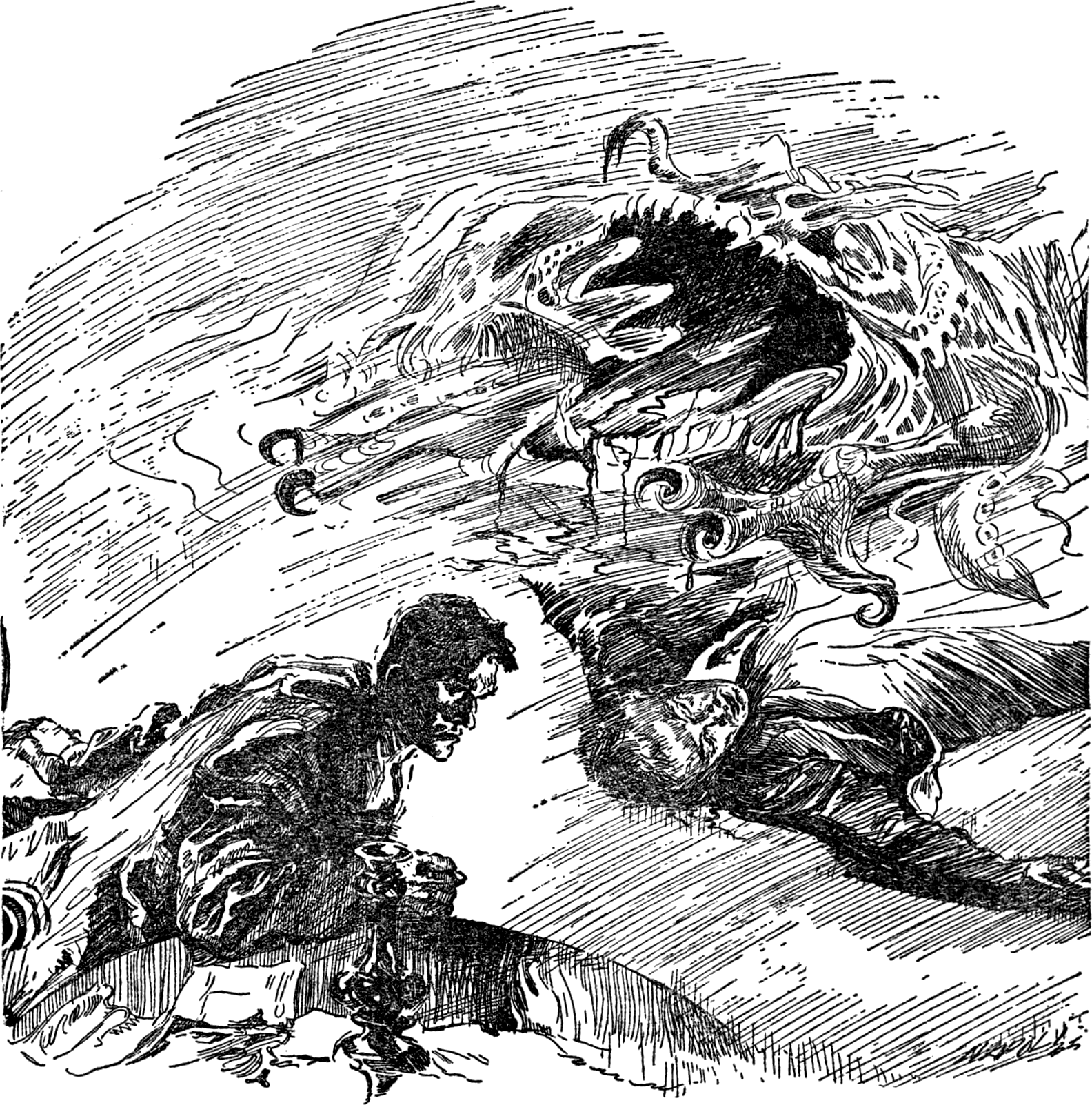
Illustration by Vincent Napoli to the first edition. The text says: "It was not a sight for sane eyes to see."

The story focuses on a nameless narrator who, in addition to being a college student, hopes to make a living as a pulp writer of weird fiction. His earliest efforts at the craft are woefully inadequate and rejected by magazine editors. As a result, he begins to yearn after the forbidden knowledge known only to those who are true practitioners of the occult, and begins sending letters of correspondence to various thinkers and dreamers from all over the country. One man in particular, a "mystic dreamer" from New England, tells him of the existence of certain nameless and forbidden tomes such as the Necronomicon and Book of Eibon. Soon afterwards, the narrator mails letters to various libraries, universities, and occult practitioners, hoping to secure the desired volumes. However, he is only met with both hostility and threats of violence. Undeterred, he then personally begins searching various bookstores around his hometown.

At first, he again meets with disappointment, but his perseverance eventually pays off and, in an old shop on South Dearborn Street, he succeeds in obtaining an occult volume known as De Vermis Mysteriis, which he knows was written by a Belgian sorcerer named Ludvig Prinn, who was burned at the stake during the witchcraft trials. Finding it to be written entirely in Latin, and not being able to speak the language, he once again contacts the New England mystic, who agrees to aid him in translation. The narrator travels to his home in Providence, Rhode Island, where the mystic is initially hesitant to even open the volume, but eventually does so upon the narrator's insistence. While perusing the book, the mystic inadvertently stumbles across a spell or invocation on a chapter dealing with familiars which he believes to be a summoning towards one of the invisible "star-sent servants" spoken of in the frightful stories surrounding Prinn.

Foolishly, the narrator makes no attempt to stop the mystic from reading the inscription out loud, and immediately afterwards, the room turns dreadfully cold, and an unearthly wind rushes in through the window, followed by a hideous laughter, which heralds the arrival of an invisible vampiric monstrosity: a star vampire. Suddenly, the monster lifts the mystic into the air, and begins feeding off of his blood until he is nothing more than a wrinkled, flabby corpse. As the creature continues to feed, it slowly becomes more and more visible until its monstrous form is fully revealed. Upon witnessing the fully visible "shambler from the stars," the narrator goes mad. After the creature retreats back into the nameless cosmic gulfs whence it had come, the book mysteriously vanishes and the narrator wanders out into the streets, shortly after setting his own friend's house on fire. While the narrator struggles to move on from his ordeal, he still subconsciously fears that the shambler from the stars will one day return for him.

== Adaptations ==
- In 1972, Marvel Comics published an adaptation of the story as part of its Journey Into Mystery anthology series, written by Ron Goulart and with art from Jim Starlin and Tom Palmer.
