= De Vermis Mysteriis =

Fictional grimoire created by Robert Bloch

De Vermis Mysteriis, or Mysteries of the Worm, is a fictional grimoire created by Robert Bloch and incorporated by H. P. Lovecraft into the lore of the Cthulhu Mythos.

== Creation ==
Ludvig Prinn's Mysteries of the Worm first appeared in Bloch's short story "The Secret in the Tomb" (Weird Tales May 1935). Lovecraft coined the Latin title, De Vermis Mysteriis.

This analogue to Lovecraft's Necronomicon also features strongly in Bloch's story "The Shambler from the Stars" (1935), in which a character reads a passage from the book and accidentally summons an extradimensional horror.

Bloch, then a teenager, corresponded with Lovecraft about the story prior to its publication, in part to get permission to kill off a character based on the older writer. While giving his enthusiastic blessing, Lovecraft also provided Bloch with a bit of Latin to use as an invocation from the book: "Tibi, magnum Innominandum, signa stellarum nigrarum et bufoniformis Sadoquae sigillum"—which can be translated as "To you, the great Not-to-Be-Named, signs of the black stars, and the seal of the toad-shaped Sadoquae (Tsathoggua)".

== Ludvig Prinn ==
In "The Shambler from the Stars", De Vermis Mysteriis is described as the work of Ludvig Prinn, an "alchemist, necromancer, [and] reputed mage" who "boasted of having attained a miraculous age" before being burned at the stake in Brussels during the height of the witch trials (in the late 15th or early 16th centuries).

Prinn, Bloch writes, maintained that he was captured during the Ninth Crusade in 1271, and attributed his occult knowledge to studying under the "wizards and wonder-workers of Syria" during his captivity. Bloch also associates Prinn with Egypt, writing that "there are legends among the Libyan dervishes concerning the old seer's deeds in Alexandria."

At the time of his execution for sorcery, Bloch has Prinn living "in the ruins of a pre-Roman tomb that stood in the forest near Brussels...amidst a swarm of familiars and fearsomely invoked conjurations." In this forest, there were "old pagan altars that stood crumbling in certain of the darker glens"; these altars were found to have "fresh bloodstains" when Prinn was arrested.

== Contents ==
In its first appearance, Bloch describes the book as containing "spells and enchantments", particularly those that can summon strange entities. One such spell, included in a "chapter dealing with familiars," summons the titular "shambler from the stars"—referred to in the Call of Cthulhu roleplaying game as a star vampire. The story also notes that that book contains references to "such gods of divination as Father Yig, dark Han, and serpent-bearded Byatis"—this last the first mention of a Cthulhoid entity later developed by Ramsey Campbell.

In a subsequent series of Cthulhu Mythos stories connected with Ancient Egypt, Bloch expanded on the contents of De Vermis Mysteriis. "The Faceless God" (1936) notes that Prinn "awesomely implies his knowledge" of Nyarlathotep, "the oldest god of all Egypt". In "The Brood of Bubastis", "The Secret of Sebek", and "Fane of the Black Pharaoh" (all published in 1937), Bloch refers to a chapter of Prinn's book called "Saracenic Rituals", which is said to have "revealed the lore of the efreet and the djinn, the secrets of the Assassin sects, the myths of Arabian ghoul-tales, the hidden practices of dervish cults" and "the legends of Inner Egypt". These stories use Prinn's chapter as a device to provide backstory on the cults of Bubastis and Sebek, and on the Pharaoh Nephren-Ka's worship of Nyarlathotep.

In later, non-Mythos horror stories, Bloch still occasionally made reference to his invented tome. Bloch's "The Sorcerer's Jewel" (1939) briefly mentions "Prinn's chapter on divination" as a potential source for information on "The Star of Sechmet", a mysterious crystal. The book plays a larger role in "Black Bargain" (1942), in which it is described as

something...that told you how you could compound aconite and belladonna and draw circles of phosphorescent fire on the floor when the stars were right. Something that spoke of melting tallow candles and blending them with corpse-fat, whispered of the uses to which animal sacrifices might be put. It spoke of meetings that could be arranged with various parties most people don't...even believe in...[with] cold deliberate directions for traffic with ancient evil....

"Philtre Tip" (1961), quite literally a shaggy dog story, cites "Ludvig Prinn's Grimoire, in the English edition", as the source for the recipe for a love potion. Bloch quotes Prinn for the first time since "The Shambler from the Stars": "The meerest droppe, if placed in a posset of wine or sack, will transforme ye beloved into a veritable bitche in heate."

== H. P. Lovecraft ==
Lovecraft, who enjoyed sprinkling references to his friends' fictional creations in his own Cthulhu Mythos efforts, repeatedly mentioned De Vermis Mysteriis in his stories. It appears in "The Haunter of the Dark" (written as a sequel to Bloch's "The Shambler from the Stars") as a "hellish" book found with other forbidden texts in the Starry Wisdom Church in Providence, Rhode Island. In "The Diary of Alonzo Typer", ghostwritten by Lovecraft for William Lumley, it is likewise part of an occult library in the van der Heyl house near Attica, New York. And in Lovecraft's "The Shadow Out of Time", the possessed protagonist Wingate Peaslee reads (and makes marginal notes in) a copy of the book possessed by the Miskatonic University library.

In a 1936 letter to fellow Mythos writer Henry Kuttner, Lovecraft mentioned De Vermis Mysteriis as one of the books that "repeat the most hellish secrets learnt by early man".

== See also ==
- Cthulhu Mythos arcane literature
- "Jerusalem's Lot", a short story by Stephen King that features the book
- Chapelwaite, a television series based on King's short story
- Revival, a 2014 novel by Stephen King that mentions the book
- Hellboy (2004 film), which references the book in its opening title card
