= Strange Eons =

1978 novel by Robert Bloch

- Title page for Strange Eons (1978)
- Author: Robert Bloch
- Language: English
- Genre: Weird fiction
- Publisher: Whispers Press
- Publication date: 1978
- Publication place: United States

Strange Eons is a 1978 novel by American writer Robert Bloch. The book is "dedicated to HPL who dedicated himself to other outsiders and gave to them a silver key". The title is a reference to a couplet from H. P. Lovecraft's short story "The Nameless City": "That is not dead which can eternal lie, And with strange eons, even death may die."

Strange Eons features a painting mentioned in "Pickman's Model" and the Starry Wisdom sect from "The Haunter of the Dark".

David J. Schow noted that "since its debut, Strange Eons has suffered a disporportionate amount of abuse, mostly at the hands of embittered stylists".

== Publication history ==
- Strange Eons (hardcover, Whispers Press, 1978)
- Strange Eons (paperback, Pinnacle Books, 1979)
- Strange Eons (paperback, Valancourt Books, 2025, ISBN 9781960241559)
