= The Opener of the Way =

1945 collection of fantasy and horror short stories by Robert Bloch

- Dust-jacket illustration by Ronald Clyne for The Opener of the Way
- Author: Robert Bloch
- Cover artist: Ronald Clyne
- Language: English
- Genre: fantasy, horror
- Publisher: Arkham House
- Publication date: 1945
- Publication place: United States
- Media type: Print (hardback)
- Pages: xi, 309 pp

The Opener of the Way is a collection of fantasy and horror short stories by American writer Robert Bloch. It was released in 1945 and was the author's first book. It was published by Arkham House in an edition of 2,065 copies. Most of the stories had appeared in the magazine Weird Tales in the 1930s and 1940s, and some of the stories are part of the Cthulhu Mythos.

A British hardcover was issued by Neville Spearman in 1974, with Panther Books issuing a two-volume paperback reprint in 1976. An Italian translation, with the stories reordered, appeared in 1991. The collection was never reprinted in the United States, but its contents (aside from Bloch's introduction) were included in the 1994 omnibus The Early Fears. Valancourt Books has scheduled an American reprinting of The Opener of the Way for late 2024, with a new introduction by Ramsey Campbell.

== Contents ==
The Opener of the Way contains the following tales:

1. "By Way of Introduction"
2. "The Cloak"
3. "Beetles"
4. "The Fiddler's Fee"
5. "The Mannikin"
6. "The Strange Flight of Richard Clayton"
7. "Yours Truly, Jack the Ripper"
8. "The Seal of the Satyr"
9. "The Dark Demon"
10. "The Faceless God"
11. "The House of the Hatchet"
12. "The Opener of the Way"
13. "Return to the Sabbath"
14. "The Mandarin's Canaries"
15. "Waxworks"
16. "The Feast in the Abbey"
17. "Slave of the Flames"
18. "The Shambler from the Stars"
19. "Mother of Serpents"
20. "The Secret of Sebek"
21. "The Eyes of the Mummy"
22. "One Way to Mars"

== Critical reception ==
Stephen King listed The Opener of the Way as one of Arkham House's "most important works". Stephen Jones and Kim Newman included the collection in Horror: Another 100 Best Books, with Joel Lang noting that it demonstrated Bloch's "meteoric development from faux-Gothic pastiche to sour, elliptical portraits of urban damnation". Don D'Ammassa stated that "Although some of the stories are crude by [Bloch's] later standards, there is a raw power to many of them that has ensured their continued popularity".

== Trivia ==
The creators of the game Half-Life 2 reference Bloch's work: the central villain, Dr. Wallace Breen refers to the player's character, Gordon Freeman in a televised speech saying "And yet, unsophisticated minds continue to imbue him with romantic power, giving him such dangerous poetic labels as 'the one free man, the opener of the way.'"

The Dungeons & Dragons role-playing game features (in the third Monster Manual) a creature called Allabar, Opener of the Way.
