= J. Vernon Shea =

American poet

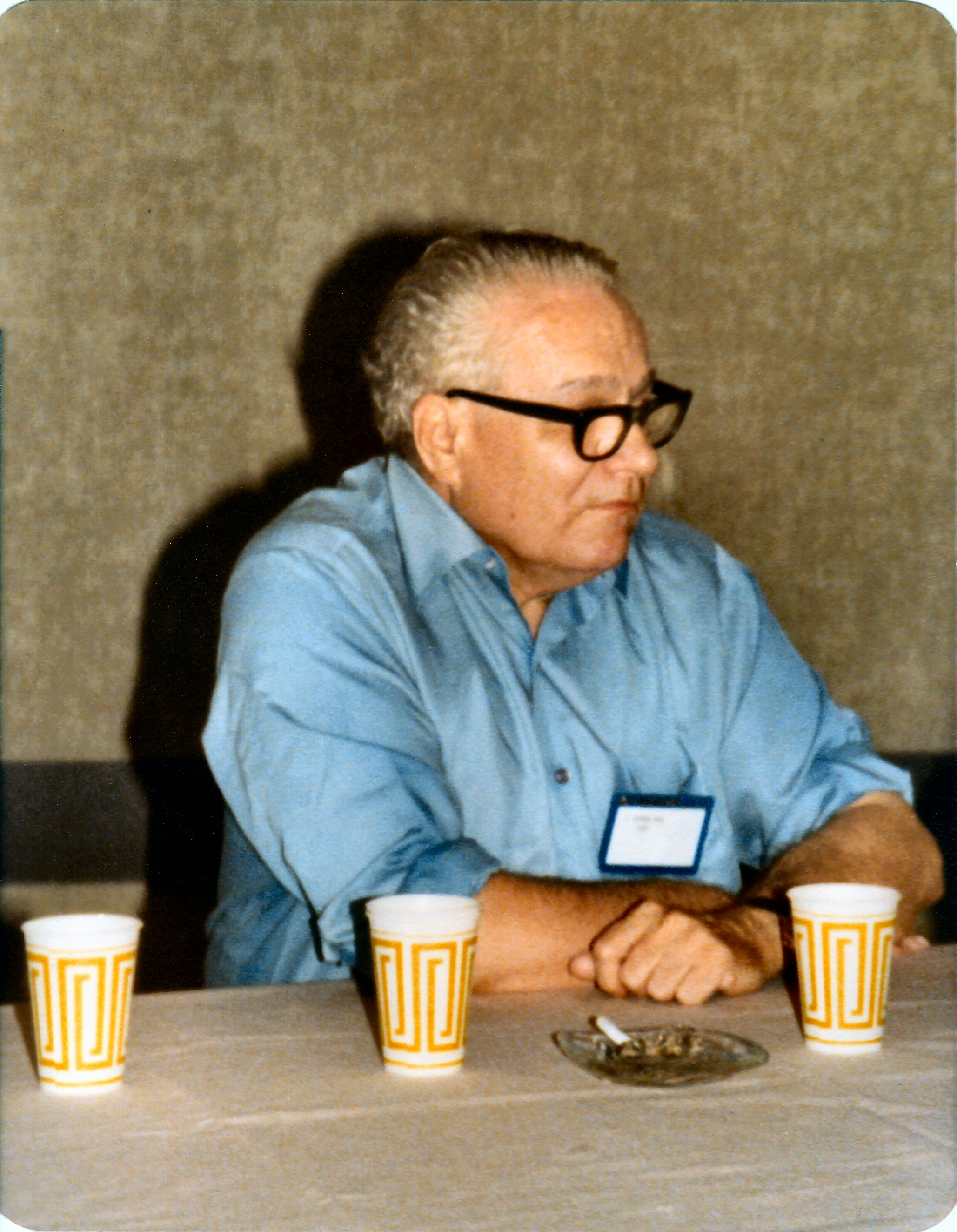
- J. Vernon Shea participating in the HPL Panel in 1978
- Born: 1912; Dayton, Kentucky
- Died: 1981 (aged 68–69); Cleveland
- Writing career
- Years active: 1925–1981
- Genres: horror; fantasy; poetry

Joseph Vernon Shea (1912–1981) was an American writer of horror, fantasy, poetry, and essays; and a correspondent of H. P. Lovecraft, Clark Ashton Smith, and August Derleth.

== Life ==
Shea was born in Dayton, Kentucky, the son of a professional magician. According to an obituary published in a 1981 issue of Crispin Burnham's Eldritch Tales, Shea's father had been a friend of such famous stage magicians as Howard Thurston, Hermann the Great, Houdini and Blackstone.

He began writing fiction and poetry around the age of 13. His letters to Weird Tales magazine also appeared in print from around that time. At the age of 19, in 1931, Shea sent some of his early efforts to H.P. Lovecraft for criticism. Shea at that time resided in Pittsburgh, Pennsylvania and apparently entered the University of Pittsburgh, but had to drop out after a year because of financial considerations. The correspondence lasted from 1931-37. Lovecraft's side of the correspondence has now been published in full in S. T. Joshi and David E. Schulz, eds. H. P. Lovecraft: Letters to J. Vernon Shea, Carl F. Strauch, and Lee McBride White. New York: Hippocampus Press, 2016, pages 15–295.

Shea later served overseas in the Army Medical Corps and was initially a private. After serving in the military, he worked as a metallurgist in Cleveland, Ohio. In the 1960s he donated what he believed to be all his letters from Lovecraft to the John Hay Library, but ten more letters were later found amongst his effects.

He was a long-time member of the "Esoteric Order of Dagon" Amateur Press Association at the time of his sudden accidental death. In the last five years of his life, from 1977, Shea contributed 20 issues of his own quarterly zine Outre to the Esoteric Order of Dagon a.p.a., contributing, in all, 1248 pages. This totals more pages than anyone else had ever contributed to the a.p.a., and Shea did not join the a.p.a. until its Mailing #13. Some of this material was gathered in a small-press booklet, In Search of Lovecraft (West Warwick, Rhode Island: Necronomicon Press, 1991).

Shea died unexpectedly in early 1981 at the Cleveland apartment where he lived alone.

== Works ==
=== Stories ===
- . (Written before Lovecraft's death in 1937; Lovecraft read and annotated the manuscript.)
- "The Old Lady's Room". August Derleth, ed., Over the Edge. Arkham House, 1964.
- "Five-Year Contract". Magazine of Horror, September 1964.
- "The Flaw". Magazine of Horror, Spring 1967.
- "The Haunter of the Graveyard". August Derleth, ed., Tales of the Cthulhu Mythos. Arkham House, 1969.
- "Icarus Climbs Toward the Sun". The Dark Brotherhood Journal, Number 2, 1972.
- "Dead Giveaway". Outré, May 1976. Reprinted in Robert M. Price, ed., The New Lovecraft Circle. Fedogan & Bremer, 1996. ISBN 1-878252-16-X.
- '"The Snouted Thing". June 1977. Reprinted in In Search of Lovecraft, 1991. Posthumous collaboration with Lovecraft.

=== Poems ===
- "When Artists Die"
- "Look to the Skies"
- "The Dream-World of H.P. Lovecraft"
- "We tire of tyrants..."
- "A Walk in Providence"
- "H.P.L.'s Gravestone"
- "So Little Time Beneath the Stars"
- "Impermanence"
- "Better Days?"
- "What Good Is a Book?"
- "Roses Blooming in November"
- "Here at Swan Point"
- "Tomorrow"

(All above reprinted in In Search of Lovecraft, 1991.)

=== Essays ===
- "H. P. Lovecraft: The House and the Shadows." The Magazine of Fantasy and Science Fiction, May 1966. (Memoir of Lovecraft.)
- "H.P.L. and Films". 1972. Reprinted in In Search of Lovecraft, 1991.
- "The Lovecraftian Saga". 1976. Reprinted in In Search of Lovecraft, 1991.
- "H. P. Lovecraft and Samuel Johnson: A Comparison". 1978. Reprinted in In Search of Lovecraft, 1991.
- "The Timeless Lovecraft". 1979. Reprinted in In Search of Lovecraft, 1991.
- "'The Outsider'". 1979. Reprinted in In Search of Lovecraft, 1991.
- "On the Literary Influences Which Shaped Lovecraft's Works". S. T. Joshi, ed., H. P. Lovecraft: Four Decades of Criticism. Ohio State University Press, 1980. ISBN 0-8214-0577-2, ISBN 978-0-8214-0577-2.
- "An Introduction to the Cthulhu Mythos". Fantasy Empire Presents H. P. Lovecraft. Tampa, Florida: New Media Publishing, 1984.

=== Books ===
- Strange Desires. Lion Books, 1954. (Edited short-story anthology.)
- Strange Barriers. Lion Books, 1955. Reprinted: Pyramid Books, 1961. (Edited short-story anthology.)
- Otherwise Nice People. This digest-sized collection of five stories was announced in 1976 by small press publisher Stellar Z Publications; however, it was never issued.
- H.P. Lovecraft: The House and the Shadows. West Warwick, Rhode Island: Necronomicon Press, 1982. ASIN B0006YAHLC. (1966 essay in chapbook.)
- In Search Of Lovecraft. West Warwick, Rhode Island: Necronomicon Press, 1991. ISBN 0-940884-39-9, ISBN 978-0-940884-39-7. (Collection of essays, fiction, and poetry, many drawn from Outre magazine) Introduction by Robert Bloch, Afterword by Donald Wandrei.

=== Periodicals ===
- Outré. (Science fiction fanzine.)
