= American Gothic (novel) =

1974 novel by Robert Bloch

- First edition
- Author: Robert Bloch
- Language: English
- Genre: Psychological horror
- Publisher: Simon & Schuster
- Publication date: 1974
- Publication place: United States
- Media type: Print
- Followed by: TBA

American Gothic is a 1974 psychological horror novel by American writer Robert Bloch, a fictionalized portrayal of real life serial killer H. H. Holmes, who is renamed "G. Gordon Gregg" for the story.

== Synopsis ==
Inspired by the case of real-life serial killer H. H. Holmes, the story follows maniacal surgeon G. Gordon Gregg, who preys on young beautiful women and, luring them into his labyrinthine castle, kills them, thus orchestrating the perfect series of crimes. However, an ambitious Chicago journalist named Crystal becomes suspicious of Gregg, a feeling made much more complicated by her attraction to him and vice versa. Crystal must also balance her own career with that of her fiancé, an insurance agent named Jim Frazer, and her boss Charlie Hogan, who is tolerant and kind and believes Crystal's story.

Posing as the niece of one of Gregg's victims, Crystal finds employment with Gregg as his secretary, slowly discovering damning clues as to Gregg's true nature. Hogan infiltrates the castle and finds Gregg's laboratory and the horrors within. There, Gregg ambushes him, knocking him unconscious. Meanwhile, Crystal finds a secret entrance to the cellar. Gregg attacks Crystal, but she and Hogan hold him off. Hogan douses Gregg with acid; reeling, Gregg fatally impales himself on a scalpel. After Hogan and Crystal escape, they express feelings for one another, and as the castle burns down, the 1893 World's Fair is brought to its spectacular end.

Bloch also wrote a 40,000-word essay based on his research for the novel, "Dr. Holmes' Murder Castle" (first published in Reader's Digest Tales of the Uncanny, 1977; since reprinted in Crimes and Punishments: The Lost Bloch, Vol. 3, 2002).

== Reception ==
The Los Angeles Times praised American Gothic, calling it a "chip off the old Bloch".
