= Robert Bloch =

American fiction writer (1917–1994)

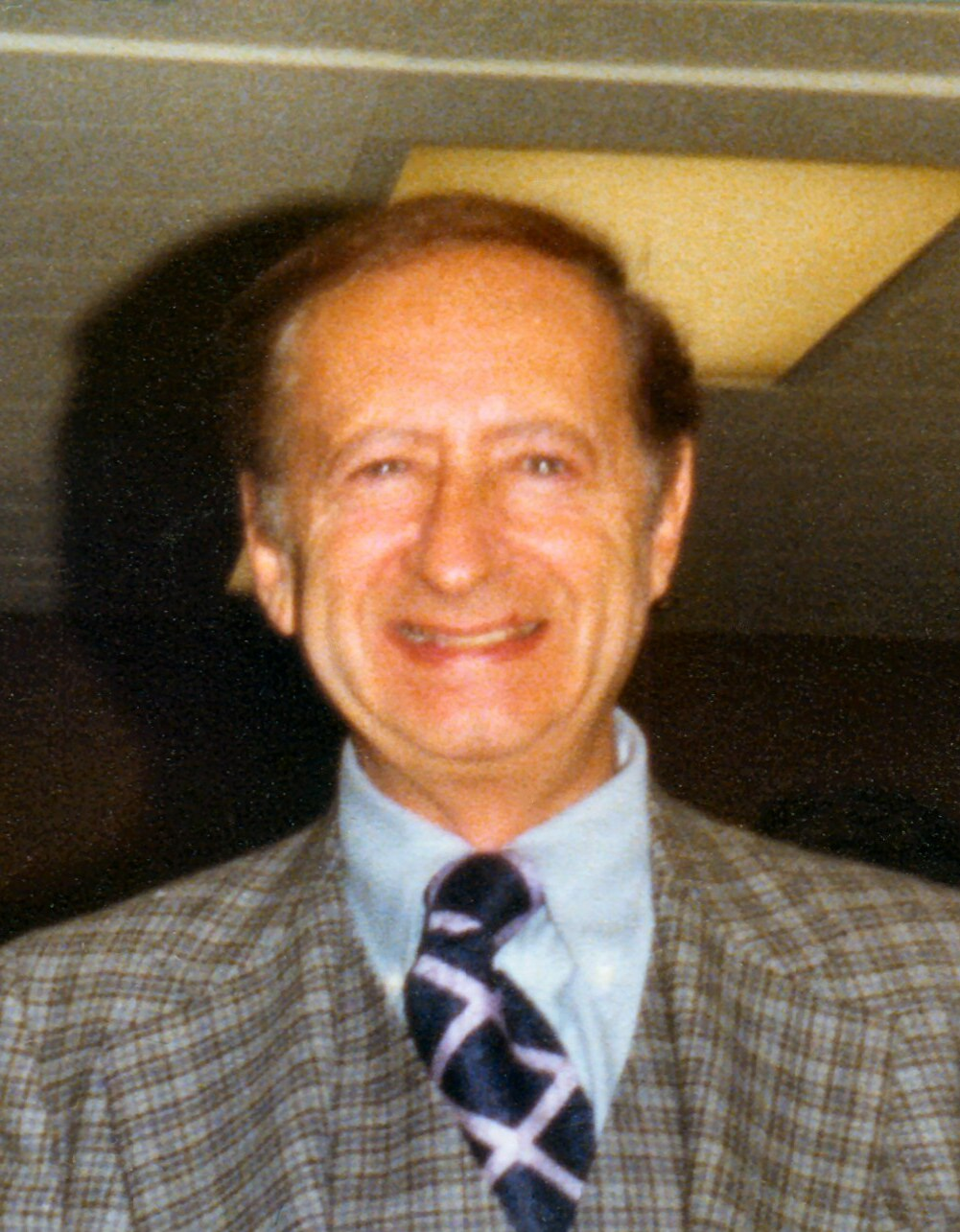
- Bloch in 1976
- Born: Robert Albert Bloch; April 5, 1917; Chicago, Illinois, U.S.
- Died: September 23, 1994 (aged 77); Los Angeles, California, U.S.
- Occupations: Novelist, short-story writer
- Spouses: Marion Ruth Holcombe (m. 1940; div. 1963) Eleanor Zalisko Alexander (m. 1964)
- Children: 1
- Writing career
- Pen name: Tarleton Fiske, Will Folke, Nathan Hindin, E. K. Jarvis, Floyd Scriltch, Wilson Kane, John Sheldon, Collier Young
- Period: 1934–1994
- Genres: Crime, Fantasy, Horror, Science fiction
- Notable works: Psycho, Psycho II, Psycho House, American Gothic, Firebug
- Website: robertbloch.net

Robert Albert Bloch (/blɒk/; April 5, 1917 – September 23, 1994) was an American fiction writer, primarily of crime, psychological horror, and fantasy, much of which has been dramatized for radio, cinema and television. He also wrote a relatively small amount of science fiction. His writing career lasted 60 years, including more than 30 years in television and film. He began his professional writing career immediately after graduation from high school, aged 17. He is best known as the writer of the novel Psycho (1959), the basis for the 1960 film Psycho directed by Alfred Hitchcock. Bloch wrote hundreds of short stories and over 30 novels. He was a protégé of H. P. Lovecraft, who was the first to seriously encourage his talent. However, while he started emulating Lovecraft and his brand of cosmic horror, he later specialized in crime and horror stories, often emphasizing psychological aspects of the characters within.

Bloch was a contributor to pulp magazines such as Weird Tales in his early career, and was also a prolific screenwriter and a major contributor to science fiction fanzines and fandom in general.

He won the Hugo Award (for his story "That Hell-Bound Train"), the Bram Stoker Award, and the World Fantasy Award. He served a term as president of the Mystery Writers of America (1970) and was a member of that organization and of Science Fiction Writers of America, the Writers Guild of America, the Academy of Motion Picture Arts and Sciences and the Count Dracula Society. In 2008, The Library of America selected Bloch's essay "The Shambles of Ed Gein" (1962) for inclusion in its two-century retrospective of American true crime.

His favorites among his own novels were The Kidnapper, The Star Stalker, Psycho, Night-World, and Strange Eons. His work has been extensively adapted into films, television productions, comics, and audiobooks.

== Early life and education ==
Bloch was born in Chicago, the son of Raphael "Ray" Bloch (1884–1952), a bank cashier, and his wife Stella Loeb (1880–1944), a social worker, both of German Jewish descent. Bloch's family moved to Maywood, a Chicago suburb, when he was five; he lived there until he was ten. He attended the Methodist Church there, despite his parents' Jewish heritage, and studied at Emerson Grammar School. In 1925, at eight years of age, living in Maywood, he attended (alone at night) a screening of Lon Chaney, Sr.'s film The Phantom of the Opera (1925). The scene of Chaney removing his mask terrified the young Bloch ("it scared the living hell out of me and I ran all the way home to enjoy the first of about two years of recurrent nightmares"). It also sparked his interest in horror. Bloch was a precocious child and found himself in fourth grade when he was eight. He also obtained a pass into the adult section of the public library, where he read voraciously. Bloch considered himself a budding artist and worked in pencil sketching and watercolours, but myopia in adolescence seemed to effectively bar art as a career. He had passions for German-made lead toy soldiers and for silent cinema.

In 1929, Bloch's father Ray Bloch lost his bank job, and the family moved to Milwaukee, where Stella worked at the Milwaukee Jewish Settlement settlement house. Robert attended Washington, then Lincoln High School, where he met lifelong friend Harold Gauer. Gauer was editor of The Quill, Lincoln's literary magazine, and accepted Bloch's first published short story, a horror story titled "The Thing" (the "thing" of the title was Death). Both Bloch and Gauer graduated from Lincoln in 1934 during the height of the Great Depression. Bloch was involved in the drama department at Lincoln and wrote and performed in school vaudeville skits.

== Career ==
=== Weird Tales magazine and the influence of H. P. Lovecraft ===
During the 1930s, Bloch was an avid reader of the pulp magazine Weird Tales, which he had discovered at the age of ten in 1927. In the Chicago Northwestern Railroad depot with his parents and aunt Lil, his aunt offered to buy him any magazine he wanted and he picked Weird Tales (Aug 1927 issue) off the newsstand over her shocked protest. He began his readings of the magazine with the first instalment of Otis Adelbert Kline's "The Bride of Osiris" which dealt with a secret Egyptian city called Karneter located beneath Bloch's birth city of Chicago. The Depression came in the early 1930s. He later recalled, in accepting the Lifetime Achievement Award at the First World Fantasy Convention (1975), how "times were very hard. Weird Tales cost twenty-five cents in a day when most pulp magazines cost a dime. I remember that meant a lot to me." He went on to relate how he would get up very early on the last day of the month, with twenty-five cents saved from his monthly allowance of one dollar, and would run all the way to a combination tobacco/magazine store and buy the new Weird Tales issue, sometimes smuggling it home under his coat if the cover was particularly risqué. His parents were not impressed with Hugh Doak Rankin's sexy covers for the magazine, and when the Bloch family moved to Milwaukee in 1928 young Bloch gradually abandoned his interest. But by the time he had entered high school, he returned to reading Weird Tales during convalescence from flu.

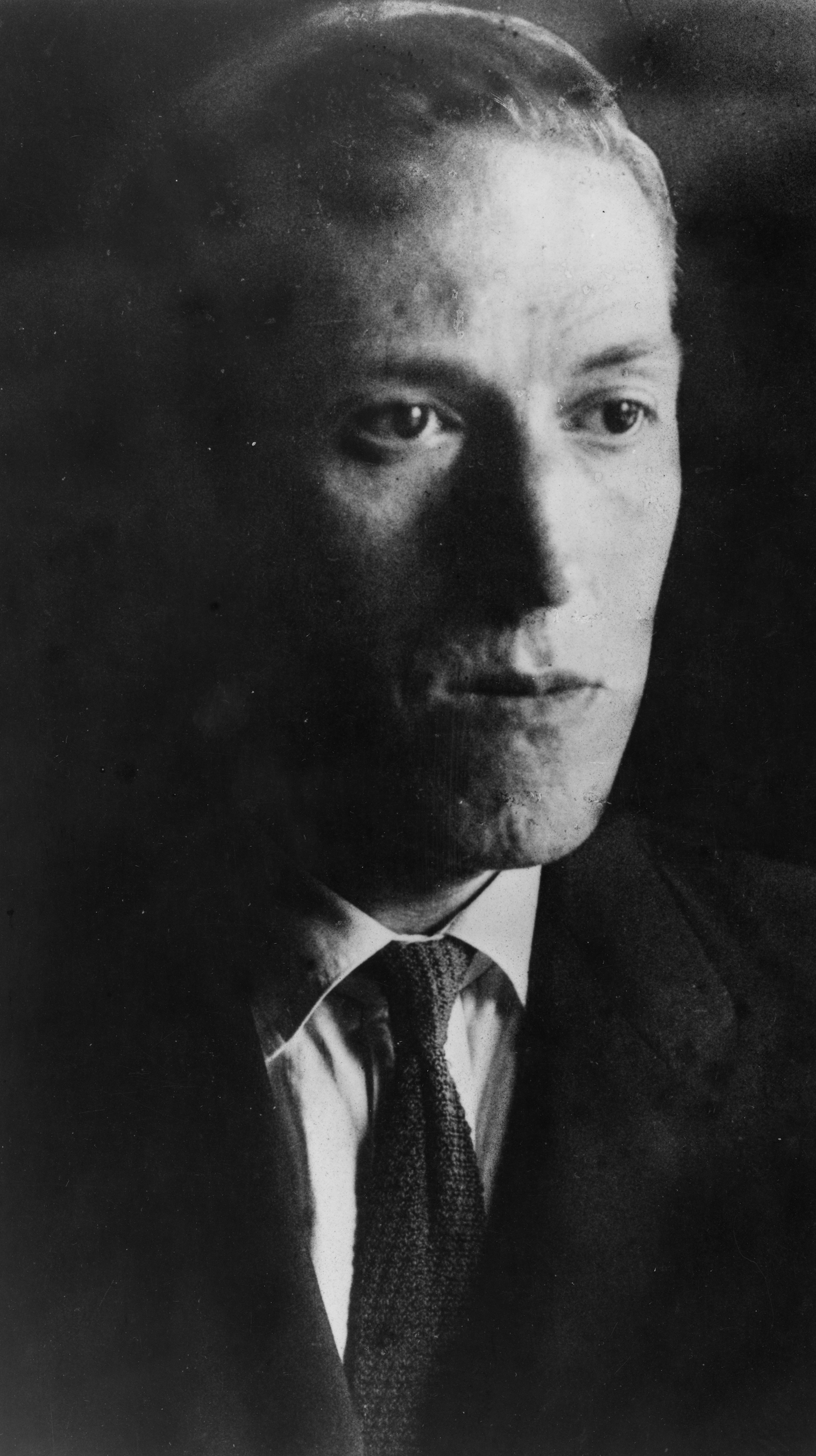
H. P. Lovecraft in June 1934

H. P. Lovecraft, a frequent contributor to Weird Tales, became one of his favorite writers. The first of Lovecraft's stories he had read was "Pickman's Model", in Weird Tales for October 1927. Bloch wrote: "In school I was forced to squirm my way through the works of Oliver Wendell Holmes, James Lowell and Henry Wadsworth Longfellow. In 'Pickman's Model', the ghouls ate all three. Now that, I decided, was poetic justice." As a teenager, Bloch wrote a fan letter to Lovecraft (1933), asking where he could find copies of earlier stories of Lovecraft's that Bloch had missed. Lovecraft lent them to him. Lovecraft also gave Bloch advice on his early fiction-writing efforts, asking whether Bloch had written any weird work and, if so, whether he might see samples of it. Bloch took up Lovecraft's offer in late April 1933, sending him two short items, "The Gallows" and another work whose title is unknown.

Lovecraft also suggested Bloch write to other members of the Lovecraft Circle, including August Derleth, R. H. Barlow, Clark Ashton Smith, Donald Wandrei, Frank Belknap Long, Henry S. Whitehead, E. Hoffmann Price, Bernard Austin Dwyer and J. Vernon Shea. Bloch's first completed tales were "Lilies", "The Laughter of a Young Ghoul" and "The Black Lotus". Bloch submitted these to Weird Tales; editor Farnsworth Wright summarily rejected them all. However Bloch successfully placed "Lilies" in the semi-professional magazine Marvel Tales (Winter 1934) and "Black Lotus" in Unusual Stories (1935). Bloch later commented, "I figured I'd better do something different or I'd end up as a florist."

Bloch graduated from high school in June 1934. He then wrote a story which promptly (six weeks later) sold to Weird Tales. Bloch's first publication in Weird Tales was a letter criticising the Conan stories of Robert E. Howard. His first professional sales, at the age of 17 (July 1934), to Weird Tales, were the short stories "The Feast in the Abbey" and "The Secret in the Tomb". "Feast ..." appeared first, in the January 1935 issue, which actually went on sale November 1, 1934; "The Secret in the Tomb" appeared in the May 1935 Weird Tales.

Bloch's correspondence with Derleth led to a visit to Derleth's home in Sauk City, Wisconsin (the headquarters of Arkham House). Bloch was impressed by Derleth who "fulfilled my expectations as a writer by wearing this purple velvet smoking jacket. That impressed me even more because Derleth didn't even smoke." Following this, and continued correspondence with Lovecraft, Bloch went to Chicago and met Farnsworth Wright, the then editor of Weird Tales. He also met the first Weird Tales writer outside of Derleth he had encountered - Otto Binder.

Bloch's early stories were strongly influenced by Lovecraft. Indeed, a number of his stories were set in, and extended, the world of Lovecraft's Cthulhu Mythos. These include "The Dark Demon", in which the character Gordon is a figuration of Lovecraft, and which features Nyarlathotep; "The Faceless God" (features Nyarlathotep); "The Grinning Ghoul" (written after the manner of Lovecraft) and "The Unspeakable Betrothal" (vaguely attached to the Cthulhu Mythos). It was Bloch who invented, for example, the oft-cited Mythos texts De Vermis Mysteriis and Cultes des Goules. Many other stories influenced by Lovecraft were later collected in Bloch's volume Mysteries of the Worm (now in its third, expanded edition). In 1935, Bloch wrote the tale "Satan's Servants", on which Lovecraft lent much advice, but none of the prose was by Lovecraft; this tale did not appear in print until 1949, in Something About Cats and Other Pieces.

The young Bloch appears, thinly disguised, as the character Robert Blake in Lovecraft's story "The Haunter of the Dark" (1936), which is dedicated to Bloch. Bloch was the only individual to whom Lovecraft ever dedicated a story. In this story, Lovecraft kills off Robert Blake, the Bloch-based character, repaying a "courtesy" Bloch earlier paid Lovecraft with his 1935 tale "The Shambler from the Stars", in which the Lovecraft-inspired figure dies; the story goes so far as to use Bloch's then-current address (620 East Knapp Street) in Milwaukee. (Bloch even had a signed certificate from Lovecraft [and some of his creations] giving Bloch permission to kill Lovecraft off in a story.) Bloch later recalled "believe me, beyond all doubt, I don't know anyone else I'd rather be killed by." Bloch later wrote a third tale, "The Shadow From the Steeple", picking up where "The Haunter of the Dark" finished (Weird Tales Sept 1950).

Lovecraft's death in 1937 deeply affected Bloch, who was then aged only 20. He recalled "Part of me died with him, I guess, not only because he was not a god, he was mortal, that is true, but because he had so little recognition in his own lifetime. There were no novels or collections published, no great realization, even here in Providence, of what was lost." Elsewhere he wrote, "the news of his fate came to me as a shattering blow; all the more so because the world at large ignored his passing. Only my parents and a few correspondents seemed to sense my shock, and my feeling that a part of me had died with him."

After Lovecraft's death in 1937, Bloch continued writing for Weird Tales, where he became one of its most popular authors. He also began contributing to other pulps, such as the science fiction magazine Amazing Stories. Bloch broadened the scope of his fiction. His horror themes included voodoo ("Mother of Serpents"), the conte cruel ("The Mandarin's Canaries"), demonic possession ("Fiddler's Fee"), and black magic ("Return to the Sabbat"). Bloch visited Henry Kuttner in California in 1937. Bloch's first science fiction story, "Secret of the Observatory", was published in Amazing Stories (August 1938).

=== Milwaukee Fictioneers and the Depression ===
In 1935 Bloch joined a writers' group, The Milwaukee Fictioneers, members of which included Stanley Weinbaum, Ralph Milne Farley and Raymond A. Palmer. Another member of the group was Gustav Marx, who offered Bloch a job writing copy in his advertising firm, also allowing Bloch to write stories in his spare time in the office. Bloch was close friends with C. L. Moore and her husband Henry Kuttner, who visited him in Milwaukee.

During the years of the Depression, Bloch appeared regularly in dramatic productions, writing and performing in his own sketches. Around 1936 he sold some gags to radio comedians Stoopnagle and Budd, and to Roy Atwell. Also in 1936, his tale "The Grinning Ghoul" was published in Weird Tales (June); "The Opener of the Way" appeared in Weird Tales (Oct); "Mother of Serpents" appeared in the December issue. The December issue also contained Lovecraft's tale "The Haunter of the Dark" in which he killed off young author "Robert Blake".

In 1937, following Lovecraft's death, "The Mannikin" appeared in Weird Tales for April. Weird Tales published "Return to the Sabbath" in July 1938. Bloch's first science fiction story, "The Secret of the Observatory" appeared in Amazing Stories (Aug 1938). In a profile accompanying this tale, Bloch described himself as "tall, dark, unhandsome" with "all the charm and personality of a swamp adder". He noted that "I hate everything", but reserved particular dislike for "bean soup, red nail polish, house-cleaning, and optimists".

=== Campaign manager for Carl Zeidler ===
In 1939, Bloch was contacted by James Doolittle, who was managing the campaign for Mayor of Milwaukee of a little-known assistant city attorney named Carl Zeidler. He was asked to work on Zeidler's speechwriting, advertising, and photo ops, in collaboration with his long-time friend Harold Gauer. They created elaborate campaign shows; in Bloch's 1993 autobiography, Once Around the Bloch, he gives an inside account of the campaign, and the innovations he and Gauer came up with – for instance, the original releasing-balloons-from-the-ceiling schtick. He comments bitterly on how, after Zeidler's victory, they were ignored and not even paid their promised salaries. He ends the story with a wryly philosophical point:

If Carl Zeidler had not asked Jim Doolittle to manage his campaign, Doolittle would never have contacted me about it. And the only reason Doolittle knew me to begin with was because he read my yarn ("The Cloak") in Unknown. Rattling this chain of circumstances, one may stretch it a bit further. If I had not written a little vampire story called "The Cloak", Carl Zeidler might never have become mayor of Milwaukee.

Also in 1939, two of Bloch's tales were published: "The Strange Flight of Richard Clayton" (Amazing Stories, August) and "The Cloak" (Unknown, March). Many of the stories Bloch published in Strange Stories in 1939 as by 'Tarleton Fiske' were fantasy/horror hybrids of the contes cruels type.

=== 1940s and 1950s ===
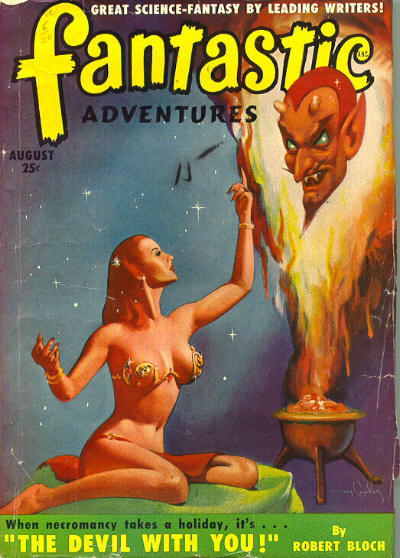
Bloch's The Devil with You! was the cover story in the July 1950 issue of Fantastic Adventures.

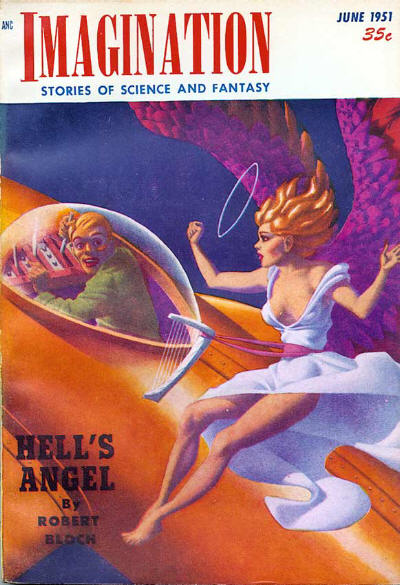
Bloch's novella Hell's Angel was the cover story in the June 1951 issue of Imagination, illustrated by Hannes Bok.

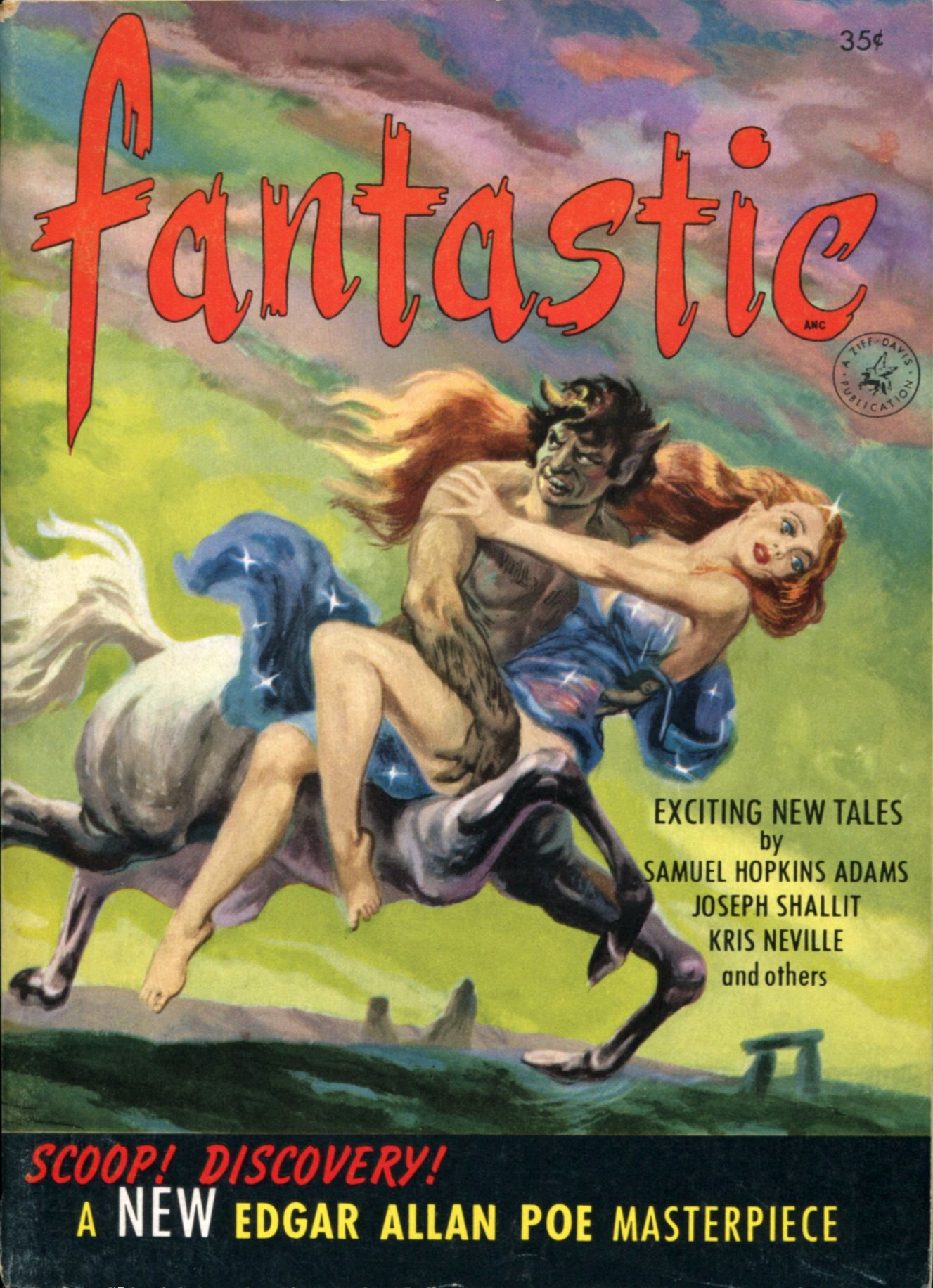
Bloch's completion of the Edgar Allan Poe fragment "The Light-House" was touted by Fantastic as "A New Edgar Allan Poe Masterpiece".

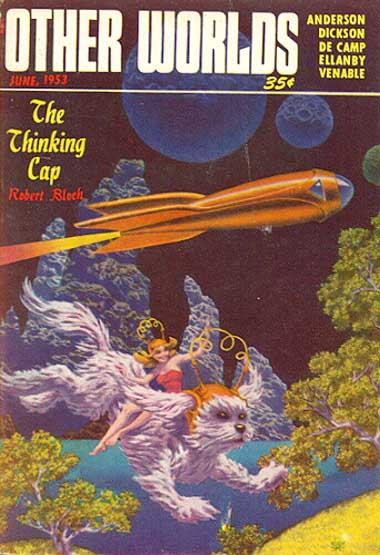
Bloch's novelette "The Thinking Cap" was the cover story in the June 1953 issue of Other Worlds, illustrated by Hannes Bok

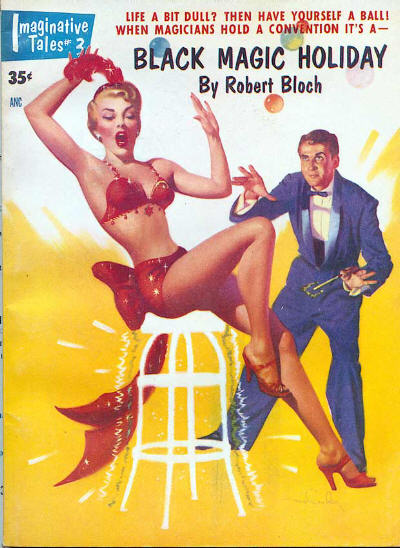
Bloch's 1950 novella The Devil with You! was retitled Black Magic Holiday when it was reprinted in Imaginative Tales in 1955.

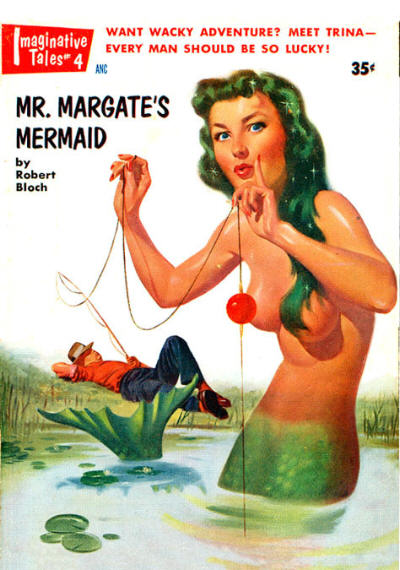
However, Bloch's 1942 novella Mr. Margate's Mermaid retained its original title when it was reprinted later in 1955.

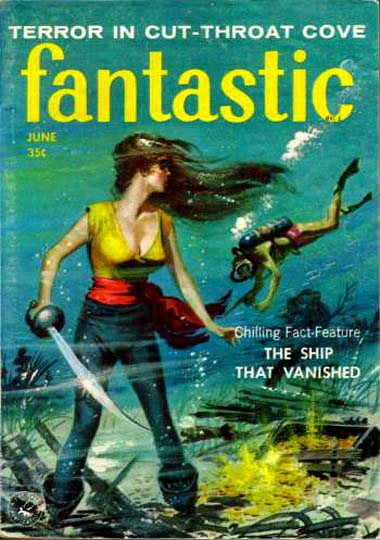
Bloch's novelette "Terror in Cut-Throat Cove" was the cover story for the June 1958 issue of Fantastic.

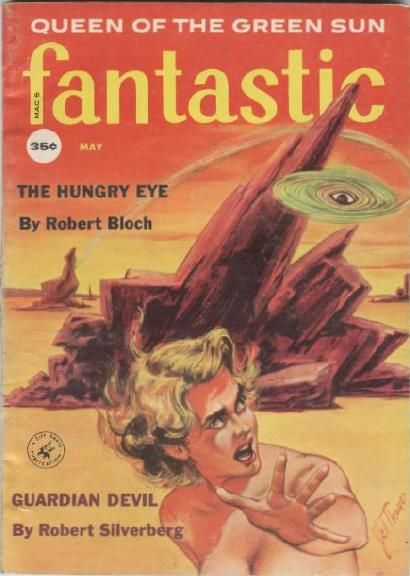
Bloch's novelette "The Hungry Eye" was cover-featured on the May 1959 issue of Fantastic.

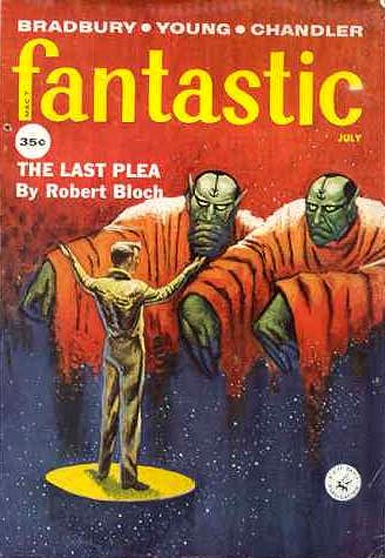
Bloch's "The Last Plea" was the cover story for the July 1959 issue of Fantastic.

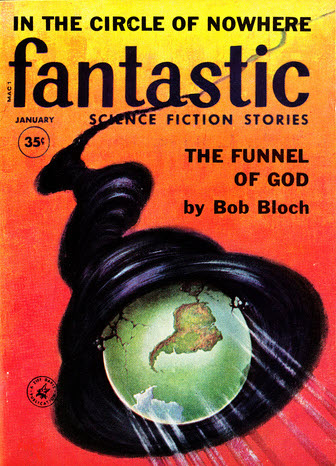
Bloch's novelette "The Funnel of God" took the cover of the January 1960 issue of Fantastic.

In October 1941, the tale "A Good Knight's Work" in Unknown Worlds first appeared. Shortly thereafter, Bloch created the Damon Runyon-esque humorous series character Lefty Feep in the story "Time Wounds All Heels" Fantastic Adventures (April 1942). This magazine, along with Weird Tales, published most of the over 100 stories Bloch wrote in the first decade of his career. Around the same time, he began work as an advertising copywriter at the Gustav Marx Advertising Agency, a position he held until 1953. Marx allowed Bloch to write stories in the office in quiet times. Bloch published a total of 23 Lefty Feep stories in Fantastic Adventures, the last one published in 1950, but the bulk appeared during World War II. Feep's character name had actually been coined by Bloch's friend/collaborator Harold Gauer for their unpublished novel In the Land of Sky-Blue Ointments, Bloch also worked for a time in local vaudeville and tried to break into writing for nationally known performers.

Bloch gradually evolved away from Lovecraftian imitations towards a unique style of his own. One of the first distinctly "Blochian" stories was "Yours Truly, Jack the Ripper" (Weird Tales, July 1943). The story was Bloch's take on the Jack the Ripper legend, and was filled out with more genuine factual details of the case than many other fictional treatments. It cast the Ripper as an eternal being who must make human sacrifices to extend his immortality. It was adapted for both radio (in Stay Tuned for Terror) and television (as an episode of Thriller in 1961 adapted by Barré Lyndon). Bloch followed up this story with a number of others in a similar vein dealing with half-historic, half-legendary figures such as the Man in the Iron Mask ("Iron Mask", 1944), the Marquis de Sade ("The Skull of the Marquis de Sade", 1945) and Lizzie Borden ("Lizzie Borden Took an Axe ...", 1946).

In 1944, Laird Cregar performed Bloch's tale "Yours Truly, Jack the Ripper" over a coast-to-coast radio network.

Towards the end of World War Two, in 1945, Bloch was asked to write 39 15-minute episodes of his own radio horror show called Stay Tuned for Terror. Many of the programs were adaptations of his own pulp stories. (All episodes were broadcast, but recordings were thought to be lost. However, in 2020, two episodes, "The Bogeyman Will Get You" and "Lizzie Borden Took an Axe" were re-discovered amongst the archives of an old-time radio enthusiast. These episodes have now been posted on YouTube and Internet Archive).. The same year he published "The Skull of the Marquis de Sade" (Weird Tales, September issue). August Derleth's Arkham House, Lovecraft's publisher, published Bloch's first collection of short stories, The Opener of the Way, in an edition of 2,000 copies, with jacket art by Ronald Clyne. At the same time, his best-known early tale, "Yours Truly, Jack the Ripper", received considerable attention through dramatization on radio and reprinting in anthologies. This story, as noted below, involving a Ripper who has found literal immortality through his crimes, has been widely imitated (or plagiarized); Bloch himself would return to the theme (see below). Stories published in 1946 include "Enoch" (September issue of Weird Tales) and Lizzie Borden Took an Axe (Weird Tales, November).

Bloch's first novel was published in hardcover – the thriller The Scarf (The Dial Press 1947; the Fawcett Gold medal paperback of 1966 features a revised text). It tells the story of a writer, Daniel Morley, who uses real women as models for his characters. But as soon as he is done writing the story, he is compelled to murder them, and always the same way: with the maroon scarf he has had since childhood. The story begins in Minneapolis and follows him and his trail of dead bodies to Chicago, New York City, and finally Hollywood, where his hit novel is going to be turned into a movie, and where his self-control may have reached its limit.

In 1948, Bloch was the Guest of Honor at Torcon I, World Science Fiction Convention, Toronto, Canada. In 1952 he published "Lucy Comes to Stay" (Weird Tales, January issue). Bloch popularised the "Auction Bloch" at science fiction conventions during the 1950s, a practice in which fans bid on professionals, buying an hour of their time. Bloch would auction off an hour of some well-known writer's time at a convention to raise money for a worthy cause. (The time gave the winner an hour of personal interaction with the writer at the convention.)

Bloch published three novels in 1954 – Spiderweb, The Kidnapper and The Will to Kill as he endeavored to support his family. That same year he was a weekly guest panelist on the TV quiz show It's a Draw. Shooting Star (1958), a mainstream novel, was published in a double volume with a collection of Bloch's stories titled Terror in the Night. This Crowded Earth (1958) was science fiction.

With the demise of Weird Tales, Bloch continued to have his fiction published in Amazing, Fantastic, The Magazine of Fantasy and Science Fiction, and Fantastic Universe; he was a particularly frequent contributor to Imagination and Imaginative Tales. His output of thrillers increased and he began to appear regularly in The Saint, Ellery Queen and similar mystery magazines, and to such suspense and horror-fiction magazine projects as Shock.

=== Jack the Ripper ===
Bloch continued to revisit the Jack the Ripper theme. His contribution to Harlan Ellison's 1967 science fiction anthology Dangerous Visions was a story, "A Toy for Juliette", which evoked both Jack the Ripper and the Marquis de Sade in a time-travel story. The same anthology had Ellison's sequel to it titled "The Prowler in the City at the Edge of the World". His earlier idea of the Ripper as an immortal being resurfaced in Bloch's contribution to the original Star Trek series episode "Wolf in the Fold". His 1984 novel Night of the Ripper is set during the reign of Queen Victoria and follows the investigation of Inspector Frederick Abberline in attempting to apprehend the Ripper, and includes some famous Victorians such as Sir Arthur Conan Doyle within the storyline.

=== Psycho ===
Bloch won the Hugo Award for Best Short Story for "That Hellbound Train" in 1959, the same year that his sixth novel, Psycho, was published. Bloch had written an earlier short story involving dissociative identity disorder, "The Real Bad Friend", which appeared in the February 1957 Mike Shayne Mystery Magazine, that foreshadowed the 1959 novel Psycho. However, Psycho also has thematic links to the story "Lucy Comes to Stay". Also in 1959, Bloch delivered a lecture titled "Imagination and Modern Social Criticism" at the University of Chicago; this was reprinted in the critical volume The Science Fiction Novel (Advent Publishers). His story "The Hungry Eye" appeared in Fantastic (May). This was also the year in which, despite having graduated from painting watercolours to oils, he gave up painting completely.

Norman Bates, the main character in Psycho, was very loosely based on two people. First was the real-life killer Ed Gein, about whom Bloch later wrote a fictionalized account, "The Shambles of Ed Gein". (The story can be found in Crimes and Punishments: The Lost Bloch, Volume 3). Second, it has been indicated by several people, including Noel Carter (wife of Lin Carter) and Chris Steinbrunner, as well as allegedly by Bloch himself, that Norman Bates was partly based on Calvin Beck, publisher of Castle of Frankenstein. Bloch's basing of the character of Norman Bates on Ed Gein is discussed in the documentary Ed Gein: The Ghoul of Plainfield, which can be found on Disc 2 of the DVD release of the remake of The Texas Chainsaw Massacre (2003). However, Bloch also commented that it was the situation itself – a mass murderer living undetected and unsuspected in a typical small town in middle America – rather than Gein himself who sparked Bloch's storyline. He writes: "Thus the real-life murderer was not the role model for my character Norman Bates. Ed Gein didn't own or operate a motel. Ed Gein didn't kill anyone in the shower. Ed Gein wasn't into taxidermy. Ed Gein didn't stuff his mother, keep her body in the house, dress in a drag outfit, or adopt an alternative personality. These were the functions and characteristics of Norman Bates, and Norman Bates didn't exist until I made him up. Out of my own imagination, I add, which is probably the reason so few offer to take showers with me."

Though Bloch had little involvement with the film version of his novel, which was directed by Alfred Hitchcock from an adapted screenplay by Joseph Stefano, he was to become most famous as its author. Bloch was awarded a special Mystery Writers of America scroll for the novel in 1961.

The novel is one of the first examples at full length of Bloch's use of modern urban horror relying on the horrors of interior psychology rather than the supernatural. "By the mid-1940s, I had pretty well mined the vein of ordinary supernatural themes until it had become varicose," Bloch explained to Douglas E. Winter in an interview. "I realized, as a result of what went on during World War II and of reading the more widely disseminated work in psychology, that the real horror is not in the shadows, but in that twisted little world inside our own skulls." While Bloch was not the first horror writer to utilise a psychological approach (it originates in the work of Edgar Allan Poe), Bloch's psychological approach in modern times was comparatively unique.

Bloch's agent, Harry Altshuler, received a "blind bid" for the novel – the buyer's name was not mentioned – of $7,500 for screen rights to the book. The bid eventually went to $9,500, which Bloch accepted. Bloch had never sold a book to Hollywood before. His contract with Simon & Schuster included no bonus for a film sale. The publisher took 15 percent according to contract, while the agent took his 10%; Bloch wound up with about $6,750 before taxes. Despite the enormous profits generated by Hitchcock's film, Bloch received no further direct compensation.

Only Hitchcock's film was based on Bloch's novel. The later films in the Psycho series bear no relation to either of Bloch's sequel novels. Indeed, Bloch's proposed script for the film Psycho II was rejected by the studio (as were many other submissions), and it was this that he subsequently adapted for his own sequel novel.

The film Hitchcock (2012) tells the story of Alfred Hitchcock's making of the film version of Psycho. Although it mentions Bloch and his novel, Bloch himself is not a character in the movie.

=== The early 1960s: Screenwriting and fiction ===
Following his move to Hollywood, around 1960, Bloch had multiple assignments from various television companies. However, he was not allowed to write for five months when the Writers Guild had a strike. After the strike was over, he became a frequent scriptwriter for television and film projects in the mystery, suspense, and horror genre. His first assignments were for the Macdonald Carey vehicle, Lock-Up, (penning five episodes) as well as one for Whispering Smith. Further TV work included an episode of Bus Stop ("I Kiss Your Shadow"), 10 episodes of Thriller (1960–62, several based on his own stories), and 10 episodes of Alfred Hitchcock Presents (1960–62). His short story collection Pleasant Dreams - Nightmares was published by Arkham House in 1960.

Bloch wrote the screenplay for The Cabinet of Caligari (1962), which is only very loosely related to the 1920 German silent film, and proved to be an unhappy experience. The same year, Bloch penned the story and teleplay "The Sorcerer's Apprentice" for Alfred Hitchcock Presents. The episode was shelved when the NBC Television Network and sponsor Revlon called its ending "too gruesome" (by 1960s standards) for airing. Bloch was pleased later when the episode was included in the program's syndication package to affiliate stations, where not one complaint was registered. Today, due to public domain status, the episode is readily available in home media formats from numerous distributors and is even available on free video on demand.

His TV work did not slow Bloch's fictional output. In the early 1960s he published several novels, including The Dead Beat (1960), and Firebug (1961), for which Harlan Ellison, then an editor at Regency Books, contributed the first 1,200 words. In 1962 numerous works appeared in book form. Bloch's novel The Couch (1962) (the basis for the screenplay of his first movie, filmed the same year) was published. That year several Bloch short story collections – Atoms and Evil, More Nightmares and Yours Truly, Jack the Ripper – were published, as well as another novel, Terror (whose working titles included Amok and Kill for Kali). Editor Earl Kemp assembled a selection of Bloch's prolific output for fan magazines as The Eight Stage of Fandom: Selections from 25 years of Fan Writing (Advent Publishers). In this era, Stephen King later wrote, "What Bloch did with such novels as The Deadbeat, The Scarf, Firebug, Psycho, and The Couch was to re-discover the suspense novel and reinvent the antihero as first discovered by James Cain."

During 1963, Bloch saw into print two further collections of short stories, Bogey men and Horror-7. In 1964 Bloch married Eleanor Alexander and wrote original screenplays for two films produced and directed by William Castle, Strait-Jacket (1964) and The Night Walker (also 1964), along with The Skull (1965). The latter film was based on his short story "The Skull of the Marquis de Sade".

=== The 1960s and 1970s: Film & TV writing ===
Bloch's further TV writing in this period included The Alfred Hitchcock Hour (7 episodes, 1962–1965), I Spy (1 episode, 1966), Run for Your Life (1 episode, 1966), and The Girl from U.N.C.L.E. (1 episode, 1967). He penned three scripts for the original Star Trek series which were screened in 1966 and 1967: "What Are Little Girls Made Of?", "Wolf in the Fold" (another Jack the Ripper variant), and "Catspaw".

In 1968, Bloch returned to London to do two episodes for the English Hammer Films series Journey to the Unknown for Twentieth Century Fox. One of the episodes, "The Indian Spirit Guide", was included in the American TV movie Journey to Midnight (1968). The other episode was "Girl of My Dreams", co-scripted with Michael J. Bird and based on the eponymous story by Richard Matheson.

Following the movie The Skull (1965), which was based on a Bloch story but scripted by Milton Subotsky, he wrote the screenplays for five feature films produced by Amicus Productions – The Psychopath (1966), The Deadly Bees (co-written with Anthony Marriott, 1967), Torture Garden (also 1967), The House That Dripped Blood (1971) and Asylum (1972). The last two films featured stories written by Bloch that were printed first in collections he published in the 1940s and early 1950s.

During the 1970s, Bloch wrote two TV movies for director Curtis Harrington – The Cat Creature (1973) (an ABC Movie of the Week) and The Dead Don't Die. The Cat Creature was an unhappy production experience for Bloch. Producer Doug Cramer wanted to do an update of Cat People (1942), the Val Lewton-produced film. Bloch commented: "Instead, I suggested a blending of the elements of several well-remembered films, and came up with a story line which dealt with the Egyptian cat-goddess (Bast), reincarnation and the first bypass operation ever performed on an artichoke heart." A detailed account of the troubled production of the film is described in Bloch's autobiography.

Bloch meanwhile (interspersed between his screenplays for Amicus Productions and other projects), penned single episodes for Night Gallery (1971), Ghost Story (1972), The Manhunter (1974), and Gemini Man (1976).

=== The later 1960s and 1970s: Fiction ===
In 1965, two further collections of short stories appeared - The Skull of the Marquis de Sade and Tales in a Jugular Vein. 1966 saw Bloch win the Ann Radcliffe Award for Television and publisher yet another collection of shorts - Chamber of Horrors. Bloch returned to the site of his childhood home at 620 East Knapp St, Milwaukee (the address used by Lovecraft for the character Robert Blake in "The Haunter of the Dark") only to find the neighborhood razed and the entire neighborhood leveled and replaced by expressway approaches.

In 1967, another Bloch collection, The Living Demons was issued. He also published another classic story of Jack the Ripper, "A Toy for Juliette" in Harlan Ellison's Dangerous Visions anthology. In 1968 he published a duo of long sf novellas as Ladies' Day and This Crowded Earth. His novel The Star Stalker was published, and Dragons and Nightmares (the first collection of Lefty Feep stories) appeared in hardcover (Mirage Press).

The collection Bloch and Bradbury (a collaboration with Ray Bradbury) and the hardcover novel The Todd Dossier, originally as by Collier Young, were published in 1969. Bloch won a second Ann Radcliffe Award, this time for Literature, in 1969. That same year, Bloch was invited to the Second International Film Festival in Rio de Janeiro, March 23–31, along with other science fiction writers from the United States, Britain and Europe.

In 1971, Bloch served as president of the Mystery Writers of America, meanwhile publishing the novel Sneak Preview, the collection Fear Today, Gone Tomorrow, and the short novel It's All in Your Mind. In 1972 he published another novel, Night-World. In 1973 Bloch was the Guest of Honor at Torcon II, World Science Fiction Convention, Toronto. 1974 saw the publication of his novel American Gothic, inspired by the true life story of serial killer H. H. Holmes.

In 1975, Bloch won the Lifetime Achievement Award at the First World Fantasy Convention held in Providence, Rhode Island. The award was a bust of H. P. Lovecraft. The occasion of this convention was the first time Bloch actually visited the city of Providence. An audio recording was made of Robert Bloch during that 1975 convention, accessible online.

In 1976, two records of Bloch recordings of his stories were released by Alternate World recordings – "Gravely, Robert Bloch!" and "Blood! The Life and Times of Jack the Ripper! (with Harlan Ellison). In 1977, Lester del Rey edited The Best of Robert Bloch for Del Rey books. Two further short story collections appeared – Cold Chills and The King of Terrors.

Bloch continued to published short story collections throughout this period. His Selected Stories (reprinted in paperback with the incorrect title The Complete Stories) appeared in three volumes just prior to his death, although many previously uncollected tales have appeared in volumes published since 1997 (see below). Bloch also contributed the story "Heir Apparent", set in Andre Norton's Witch World, to Tales of the Witch World (Vol. 1), NY: Tor, 1987.

1979 saw the publication of Bloch's novel There is a Serpent in Eden (also reissued as The Cunning), and two more short story collections, Out of the Mouths of graves and Such Stuff as Screams Are Made Of.

His numerous novels of the 1970s demonstrate Bloch's thematic range, from science fiction – Sneak Preview (1971) – through horror novels such as the loving Lovecraftian tribute Strange Eons (Whispers Press, 1978) and the non-supernatural mystery There is a Serpent in Eden (1979).

=== The 1980s ===
Bloch's screenplay-writing career continued active through the 1980s, with teleplays for Tales of the Unexpected (one episode, 1980), Darkroom (two episodes,1981), Alfred Hitchcock Presents (1 episode, 1986), Tales from the Darkside (three episodes, 1984–87: "Beetles", "A Case of the Stubborns" and "Everybody Needs a Little Love") and Monsters (three episodes, 1988–1989: "The Legacy", "Mannikins of Horror", and "Reaper"). No further screen work appeared in the last five years before his death, although an adaptation of his "collaboration" with Edgar Allan Poe, "The Lighthouse", was filmed as an episode of The Hunger in 1998.

The First World Fantasy Convention: Three Authors Remember (Necronomicon Press, 1980) features reminiscences of that important event by Bloch, T.E.D. Klein and Fritz Leiber. In 1981, Zebra Books issued the first edition of the Cthulhu Mythos-themed collection Mysteries of the Worm. This item was reprinted some years later in an expanded edition by Chaosium.

Bloch's sequel to the original Psycho, Psycho II, was published in 1982 and in 1983 he novelized Twilight Zone: The Movie. His novel Night of the Ripper (1984), was another return to one of Bloch's favourite themes, the Jack the Ripper murders of 1888.

In 1986, Scream Press published the hardcover omnibus Unholy Trinity, collecting three by now scarce Bloch novels, The Scarf, The Dead Beat, and The Couch. A second retrospective selection of Bloch's nonfiction was published by NESFA Press as Out of My Head.

In 1987, Bloch celebrated his 70th birthday. Underwood-Miller issued the three-volume hardcover set The Selected Stories of Robert Bloch (individual volumes titled Final Reckonings, Bitter Ends and Last Rites). When Citadel Press reissued this in paperback they incorrectly named it The Collected Stories of Robert Bloch. The same year a collection, Midnight Pleasures appeared from Doubleday, and Lost in Time and Space with Lefty Feep (Creatures at Large Press) collected a number of the stories on the Lefty Feep series. The latter was the first of a projected series of three volumes, but the further volumes were never published. In 1988, Tor Books reissued Bloch's scarce second novel, The Kidnapper.

In 1989, several works were published: the collection Fear and Trembling, the thriller novel Lori (later adapted as a standalone graphic novel) and another omnibus of long out-of-print early novels, Screams (containing The Will to Kill, Firebug, and The Star Stalker). Randall D. Larson issued The Robert Bloch Companion: Collected Interviews 1969-1986 (Starmont House), together with Robert Bloch (Starmont Reader's Guide No 37), an exhaustive study of Bloch's work, and The Complete Robert Bloch: An Illustrated, Comprehensive Bibliography (Fandom Unlimited Enterprises). Larson's three books were bound in hardcover and distributed by Borgo Press.

=== The 1990s: Last works ===
Bloch's novel, The Jekyll Legacy (1990), was a collaboration with Andre Norton and a sequel to Robert Louis Stevenson's Dr. Jekyll and Mr. Hyde. The same year he returned to the Norman Bates "mythos" with Psycho House (Tor), the third Psycho novel. As with the second novel in the sequence, it bears no relation to the film titled Psycho III. It would prove to be his last published novel.

In February 1991, he was given the Honor of Master of Ceremonies at the first World Horror Convention held in Nashville, Tennessee. Weird Tales issued a special Robert Bloch issue in Spring, including his screenplay for the televised version of his tale "Beetles"". A standalone chapbook of the story "Yours Truly, Jack the Ripper" was issued in both hardcover and paperback by Pulphouse, and Bloch co-edited with Martin H. Greenberg the original anthology Psycho-Paths (Tor). In 1991 Bloch contributed an Introduction to In Search of Lovecraft by J. Vernon Shea.

In 1992, Bloch celebrated his 75th birthday with a bash at a Los Angeles mystery/horror bookstore which was attended by many sf/horror notables. In 1993, he published his "unauthorized autobiography", Once Around the Bloch (Tor) and edited the original anthology Monsters in Our Midst.

In early 1994, Fedogan and Bremer published a collection of 39 of his stories, The Early Fears. Bloch began editing a new original anthology, Robert Bloch's Psychos but was unable to complete work on it prior to his death; Martin H. Greenberg finished the work posthumously and the book appeared several years later (1997).

== Personal life ==
On October 2, 1940, Bloch married Marion Ruth Holcombe; it was reportedly a marriage of convenience designed to keep Bloch out of the army. During their marriage, she suffered (initially undiagnosed) from tuberculosis of the bone, which affected her ability to walk.

After working for 11 years for the Gustav Marx Advertising Agency in Milwaukee, Bloch left in 1953 and moved to Weyauwega, Marion's home town, so she could be close to friends and family. Although she was eventually cured of tuberculosis, she and Bloch divorced in 1963. Bloch's daughter Sally (born 1943) elected to stay with him.

On January 18, 1964, Bloch met recently widowed Eleanor ("Elly") Alexander (née Zalisko), who had lost her first husband, writer/producer John Alexander, to a heart attack three months earlier, and married her in a civil ceremony on the following October 16. Elly was a fashion model and cosmetician. They honeymooned in Tahiti, and in 1965 visited London, then British Columbia. They remained happily married until Bloch's death. Elly remained in the Los Angeles area for several years after selling their Laurel Canyon Home to fans of Bloch, eventually choosing to go home to Canada to be closer to her own family. She died March 7, 2007, at the Betel Home in Selkirk, Manitoba, Canada. Her ashes have been placed next to Bloch's in a similar book-shaped urn at Pierce Brothers in Westwood, California.

Bloch died on September 23, 1994, from cancer aged 77. He survived by seven months the death of another member of the original "Lovecraft Circle", Frank Belknap Long, who had died in January 1994.

Bloch was cremated and his ashes interred in the Room of Prayer columbarium at Westwood Village Memorial Park Cemetery in Los Angeles.

=== The Robert Bloch Award ===
The Robert Bloch Award was first presented at NecronomiCon: The Cthulhu Mythos Convention, the 'First Edition' (August 1993), run by the Lovecraft Society of New England. The Society decided that, on the occasion of the convention, it would be appropriate to honor a person who had contributed significantly to the field of Lovecraftian weird fiction "in their own right." Thus the convention committee bestowed its first award to Robert Bloch himself.

After Bloch's passing in 1994, the award was officially designated the Robert Bloch Award, and was presented at subsequent conventions until the NecronomiCon 'Fifth Edition' of 2001. The awardees included not only fiction writers, but also scholars who, by investigating weird fiction, helped enrich readers' knowledge and imaginations. NecronomiCon was revived in 2013 as Necronomicon Providence, under the auspices of the Lovecraft Arts and Sciences Council. The recipient of the Robert Bloch Award in 2013 was editor and scholar S.T. Joshi. The award is in the shape of the Shining Trapezohedron as described in H. P. Lovecraft's tale dedicated to Bloch, "The Haunter of the Dark".

== Comic adaptations ==
A number of Bloch's works have been adapted in graphic form for comics. These include:

- "Alfred Hitchcock's Psycho" adapted by Innovation Publishing as a three-part miniseries. Script and art by Felipe Echevarria. 1992.
- "The Past Master" in Christopher Lee's Treasury of Terror. NY: Pyramid, 1967.
- "Yours Truly, Jack the Ripper" in Journey into Mystery v2 2 (Marvel Comics, Dec 1972). Script by Ron Goulart, art by Gil Kane and Ralph Reese. Reprinted in Masters of Terror 1 (Marvel large size b&w, July 1975).
- "The Shambler from the Stars" in Journey Into Mystery v2 3 (Marvel Comics, Feb 1973). Script by Ron Goulart, art by Jim Starlin and Tom Palmer. Reprinted in Masters of Terror 1 (Marvel large size b&w, Jul 1975).
- "The Shadow from the Steeple" in Journey into Mystery v2 5 (Marvel Comics, Jun 1973)
- "The Man Who Cried Wolf" (as "The Man Who Cried Werewolf!") in Monsters Unleashed 1 (Marvel Comics, large size b&w, Jul 1973). Script by Gerry Conway, art by Pablo Marcos.
- "The Beasts of Barsac" (as "The Living Dead") in Vampire Tales 5 (Marvel Comics, large size b&w, Jun 1974).
- "The Fear Planet" (as "And the Blood Ran Green") in Starstream 4 (Whitman, 1976). Script by Arnold Drake, art by Nevio Zaccara.
- Hell on Earth. Standalone graphic adaptation by Keith Giffen and Robert Loren Fleming, based on Bloch's story from Weird Tales (1942). DC Comics, 1985.
- "A Toy for Juliette" in Deepest Dimensions 1 (1993).
- Lori Standalone graphic adaptation by Ben Templesmith. (IDW, 2009).
- "Final Performance" in Doomed 1 (IDW, 2010). Adapted by Kristian Donaldson and Chris Ryall. Also included in Completely Doomed graphic anthology (IDW, 2011).
- "Warm Farewell" in Doomed 2 (IDW, 2010)
- "Fat Chance" in Doomed 3 (IDW, 2010).(Also includes a remembrance of Bloch by Jack Ketchum.)
- "Ego Trip" in Doomed 4 (IDW, 2010).
- "Yours Truly, Jack the Ripper". 3-issue mini-series (IDW, 2010) and also collected as trade paperback (IDW, 2011). Scripted by Joe R. Lansdale.
- "That Hellbound Train". 3-issue mini-series (IDW, 2011). Scripted by Joe R. Lansdale

The comic Aardwolf (No 2, Feb 1995) is a special tribute issue to Bloch. It contains brief tributes to Bloch from Harlan Ellison, Ray Bradbury, Richard Matheson, Julius Schwartz and Peter Straub incorporated within a piece called "Robert Bloch: A Retrospective" compiled by Clifford Lawrence. The first part of the text of Bloch's story "The Past Master" is also reprinted in this issue.

Bloch also contributed a script as part of the DC one-shot benefit comic Heroes Against Hunger.

The character Inspector Bloch in the Italian comic Dylan Dog is partly inspired by Robert Bloch.

== Audio productions ==
A number of Bloch's works have been adapted for audio productions. Various recordings of Bloch speaking at fantasy and sf conventions are also extant. Many of these are available for download from Will Hart's CthulhuWho site:

=== Readings ===
- "Almost Human" (1997). Friends, Robots, Countrymen. Ed. Isaac Asimov and Martin H. Greenberg. Dercum Audio. ISBN 1-55656-256-X.
- Blood! The Life and Times of Jack the Ripper. Alternate World recordings, 1977. LP (2 record set). Bloch himself reads "Yours Truly Jack the Ripper" and "A Toy for Juliette". Harlan Ellison reads his "The Prowler in the City at the Edge of the World".
- "The Funny Farm" (Jan 1977). Read by Michael Hanson (abridged). Mindwebs. Download
- Gravely, Robert Bloch. Alternate World Recordings, 1976. LP. Bloch himself reads "That Hellbound Train" and "Enoch".
- "The Hell-Bound Train" (1979). Read by Michael Hanson (abridged). Mindwebs. Download
- The Living Dead (Aug 1996). Read by Michael Page. Stellar Audio, Vol. 5: Horror edition (Brilliance Audio). 1 cassette. Running time 90 mins. ISBN 1-56740-970-9. Packaged with You'll Catch Your Death by P.N. Elrod, read by J. Charles.
- "The Movie People" (1997). Unabridged. Hollywood Fantasies – Ten Surreal Visions of Tinsel Town. Dove Audio/Audio Literature. 4 cassettes. Running time 6 hours. ISBN 0-7871-0946-0.
- "The Plot Is the Thing" (1976). Read by Michael Hanson (abridged). Mindwebs. Download
- Psycho (1986). Read by Kevin McCarthy. Listen for Pleasure. ISBN 0-88646-165-0 (2 cassettes, abridged, running time 2 hours). Reissued Feb 1999 ISBN 0-88646-492-7.
- Psycho (1997). Read by William Hootkins. Magmasters Sound Studios/ABC Audio. (2 cassettes, running time 3 hours). ISBN 1-84007-002-1.
- Psycho (Jun 2000). Read by William Hope. BBC Radio Collection. ? cassettes. Abridged. ISBN 0-563-47710-5.
- Psycho (Sep 2009). Read by Paul Michael Garcia. Blackstone Audio, Feb 2009. ISBN 978-1-4332-5705-6 (4 cassette set), 9781433257094 (1 mp3-cd), 9781433257063 (5 cd set). Unabridged. Running times 5.6 hours. Playaway preloaded digital audio ed. with earbuds. ISBN 1-4332-5713-0.
- Psycho (in German) (2011). Read by Matthias Brandt. Der Audio Verlag. (5-CD set). ISBN 978-3-89813-975-5
- Psycho II: The Nightmare Continues (Aug 1992). Sunset Productions. ISBN 1-56431-019-1.
- Psycho House (Psycho III) (Jun 1992). Read by Mike Steele. Sunset Productions/Audio gems. 2 cassettes. Abridged? ISBN 1-56431-037-X.
- Thrillogy (1993). Read by Roger Zelazny. Sunset Productions.(1 cassette, running time 90 mins). ISBN 1-56431-045-0. Includes the three Bloch stories "That Hellbound Train", "Yours Truly, Jack the Ripper", and "The Movie People.
- "Yours Truly, Jack the Ripper" (1994). Read by Arte Johnson and Robert Forster. The Greatest Mysteries of All Time. Newstar Media. 1 cassette. Running time ? ISBN 0-7871-2092-8. Packaged with "Hight Darktown" by James Ellroy.
- "Yours Truly, Jack the Ripper" (1998). Read by Robert Forster. The Greatest Horror Stories of the 20th Century. Edited by Martin Greenberg. Dove Audio. 4 cassettes. Running time 6 hours. ISBN 0-7871-1723-4
- This Crowded Earth (Mar 1999). Read by Gregg Margarite. Librivox. (3-CD set, running time 3 hours, 30 mins). Download

=== Dramatizations ===
- "Almost Human" (May 1950). Adapted by George Lefferts. Dimension X, NBC Radio. Script performed again on X Minus One (1955). Download.
- "The Boogeyman Will Get You" (1945). Adapted by Robert Bloch. Stay Tuned for Terror, NBC Radio. Download
- "Breakdown" (Jun 1945). Adapted by Joel Hammel. Mollé Mystery Theatre, NBC Radio.
- "A Good Knight's Work" (2001). Adapted by George Zarr. Seeing Ear Theater, SciFi.com.
- "Lizzie Borden Took an Axe" (1945). Adapted by Robert Bloch. Stay Tuned for Terror, NBC Radio. Download
- "Return to the Sabbath" (2024). Adapted by Pete Lutz. The Cellar, Narada Radio Company. Download
- "Shambler from the Stars" (2019). Adapted by Jonathan Pezza. Curious Matter Anthology Podcast. Download
- "Water's Edge" (titled "The Fifty-Six G's"; 1970). Adapted by Michael McCabe. Beyond Midnight, Springbok Radio.
- "Yours Truly, Jack the Ripper" (1945). Adapted by Joel Hammel. Mollé Mystery Theatre, NBC Radio.

== Bibliography ==
=== Novels ===
- In the Land of Sky-Blue Ointments (with Harold Gauer) (c. 1938) (unpublished, though characters and episodes from this book appear in later Bloch short stories, such as "The Travelling Salesman" and "The Strange Island of Dr Nork". The character Lefty Feep also appears for the first time in this work. Bloch owned the complete manuscript of the novel, which he described as "never intended or submitted for publication." Bloch's estate has blocked posthumous publication). Plot summary at:
- Nobody Else Laughed (with Harold Gauer) (1939) (unpublished)
- The Scarf NY: The Dial Press, 1947. Retitled reprint, NY: Avon, 1948 as The Scarf of Passion. Revised text, Fawcett Gold Medal, 1966. Printings after the Avon 1948 edition revert title to the original, i.e. The Scarf. See also Unholy Trinity, 1986.
- Spiderweb (NY: Ace Pocketbooks, 1954; one half of Ace Double, backed with David Alexander's The Corpse in My Bed). An early version of this novel was published as "Once a Sucker" in Blue book (Aug 1952).
- The Kidnaper (Lion Pocketbooks, 1954). Later editions spell the title as The Kidnapper.
- The Will to Kill (NY: Ace Pocketbooks,1954)
- Shooting Star (NY: Ace Pocketbooks, 1958) (first half of Ace Double, backed with Bloch's ss collection Terror in the Night) No ISBN – identified only as Ace Double D-265
- This Crowded Earth (1958) (original magazine appearance; published as book in double format with Ladies Day 1968)
- Psycho (NY: Simon & Schuster, 1959; UK: Robert Hale, April 1960). Adapted into the 1960 film, Psycho, directed by Alfred Hitchcock; later remade in 1998 by Gus Van Sant
- The Dead Beat (NY: Simon & Schuster, 1960; London: Robert Hale, 1961). No ISBN. An "Inner Sanctum" Mystery. Library of Congress Card No 60-6100. The most extensively translated of Bloch's novels save Psycho and Psycho II - Larson's bibliography lists 13 translations in various languages to 1986. See also Unholy Trinity (1986).
- Firebug (NY: Regency Books, 1961). RB 101.
- The Couch (NY: Gold Medal, 1962; London: Frederick Muller Gold medal, 1962). See also Unholy Trinity (1986). Novelisation by Bloch of his screenplay for the previously filmed movie.
- Terror (Belmont Books, 1962) [ISBN unspecified]; Belmont L92-537 (Working title: Amok; 2 German editions appeared under this title).
- Ladies Day / This Crowded Earth (1968) A Belmont Double. Belmont B60-080 OCLC 1649428. Two science fiction novelets.
- The Star Stalker (NY: Pyramid Books, 1968). Pyramid T-1869. Note: Bloch's title was Colossal. The publisher changed it without consultation with the author.
- The Todd Dossier (1969, Delacorte US; Macmillan UK – no ISBN.)(as by Collier Young). Note: The byline on this book is not a Bloch pseudonym; Collier Young was a film producer who had secured a book deal with Bloch for his planned film called THE TODD DOSSIER. Bloch wrote the novel based on a story by Joan Didion and John Gregory Dunne. The film was never made; Bloch, who had contracted for a paperback release, was shocked to learn that the producer had placed his own name on the book as author when it was published in hardcover editions.
- Sneak Preview (Paperback Library, 1971) OCLC 2487497
- It's All in Your Mind (Curtis Books, 1971). Reprinted from its Imaginative Tales 1955 magazine appearance, where it was titled "The Big Binge". "The Big Binge" can also be found in The Lost Bloch, Volume One (see below).
- Night World (Simon & Schuster, 1972; UK: Robert Hale, 1974.) ISBN 0-7091-3805-9
- American Gothic (Simon & Schuster, 1974)ISBN 0-671-21691-0. Note: This novel was inspired by the true life story of serial killer H. H. Holmes. Bloch also wrote a 40,000-word essay based on his research for the novel, "Dr Holmes' Murder Castle" (first published in Reader's Digest Tales of the Uncanny, 1977; since reprinted in Crimes and Punishments: The Lost Bloch, Vol 3, 2002).
- Strange Eons (Whispers Press, 1978) (a Cthulhu Mythos novel). ISBN 0-918372-30-5 (trade ed); 0-918372-29-1 (signed/boxed ed.) Third runner-up in the Best Novel category, Balrog Award, 1980.
- There Is a Serpent in Eden (1979). Reissued as The Cunning (Zebra Books, 1979). ISBN 0-89083-825-9
- Psycho II (Whispers Press, 1982). 0-91832-09-7 (trade ed); 0-918372-08-9 (signed/boxed ed, 750 copies). (Unrelated to the film of the same name)
- Twilight Zone: The Movie. (NY: Warner Books, 1983; London: Corgi, 1983). Novelisation of the Warner Bros movie, based on stories by John Landis, George Clayton Johnson, Richard Matheson, Josh Rogan, and Jerome Bixby. ISBN 0-446-30840-4
- Night of the Ripper (Doubleday,1984).ISBN 0-385-19422-6. Novel about Jack the Ripper.
- Unholy Trinity (collects The Scarf, The Couch and The Dead Beat(Scream/Press, 1986). ISBN 0-910489-09-2 (Trade edition and 350 copy boxed ed signed by author and artist bear the same ISBN)
- Lori (Tor, 1989) ISBN 0-312-93176-X.
- Screams: Three Novels of Suspense (collects The Will to Kill, Firebug and The Star Stalker)(Underwood-Miller, 1989) ISBN 0-88733-079-7 (trade edition); 0-88733-080-0 (signed edition, 300 numbered copies).
- Psycho House (Tor, 1990) ISBN 0-312-93217-0.(Unrelated to the films Psycho II, Psycho III or Psycho IV: The Beginning)
- The Jekyll Legacy (Tor, 1991) ISBN 0-312-85037-9.
- Yours Truly, Jack the Ripper (1991) (Pulphouse; a 100-copy hardbound signed edition of Bloch's famous short story) ISBN 1-56146-906-8
- The Thing (1993) (Pretentious Press; a limited edition of 85 copies, only 9 bound in cloth, of the author's first appearance in print – a parody of H. P. Lovecraft which originally appeared in the April 1932 issue of The Quill, his Lincoln High School literary magazine)
- Psycho – The 35th Anniversary Edition (Gauntlet Press, 1994). ISBN 0-9629659-9-5. Limited edition of 500 copies. The last work to be signed by Bloch before his death; includes a new intro by Richard Matheson and a new Afterword by Ray Bradbury

=== Short-story collections ===
- A Portfolio of Some Rare and Exquisite Poetry by the Bard of Bards (1937 or 1938), written under the pseudonym Sarcophagus W. Dribble. One page folded to make 4. Poetry. This item has been stated to be Bloch's first true book; however it actually seems to have appeared in the fanzine Novacious No 2 (March 1939) edited by Forrest J. Ackerman and Myrtle R. Douglas ('Morojo'); distributed by the Fantasy Amateur Press Association. A copy of this fanzine is held by the Special Collections at Kuhn Library, University of Maryland Baltimore.

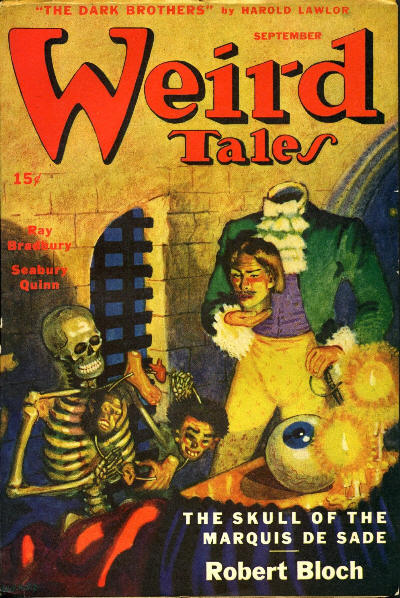
The title story of The Skull of the Marquis de Sade was originally published as the cover feature in the September 1945 Weird Tales

- The Opener of the Way (Arkham House, 1945; UK Neville Spearman, 1974). Reissued by Panther Books, UK in two paperback volumes, 1976 - volume 1 as The Opener of the Way and volume 2 as The House of the Hatchet.
- Sea Kissed (London: Utopian, 1945). Chapbook of four stories. The title story, co-penned with Henry Kuttner, was originally titled "The Black Kiss" (1935).
- Terror in the Night (NY: Ace Books, 1958). (Published in a double volume with Bloch's novel Shooting Star.) No ISBN – D-265 on spine.
- Pleasant Dreams: Nightmares (Arkham House,1960; UK: Whiting, 1967)). See also Nightmares and More Nightmares (1961), Yours Truly, Jack the Ripper (1962), Horror-7 (1963), Pleasant Dreams (1979) and The Early Fears (1994).
- Blood Runs Cold (1961). NY: Simon & Schuster, 1961. UK: Robert Hale, 1963. No ISBN. Note: British editions omit four stories from the US editions.
- Nightmares (NY: Belmont Books, 1961). 9 stories from Pleasant Dreams: Nightmares. Contains new introduction by Bloch.
- More Nightmares (Belmont Books, 1961). No ISBN – Belmont #L92-530. 10 stories from The Opener of the Way and Pleasant Dreams: Nightmares
- Yours Truly, Jack the Ripper (NY: Belmont Books, 1962) No ISBN – L 92–527 on spine. 9 stories drawn from The Opener of the Way and Pleasant Dreams: Nightmares. UK reissues by Tandem (1965) and Sphere (1971) appeared as The House of the Hatchet and Other Tales of Horror. These UK variant title reissues are not to be confused with the later Panther UK collection House of the Hatchet, (1976; 11 stories), whose contents are almost entirely different.
- Atoms and Evil (Gold Medal Books, 1962)
- Horror 7 (Belmont Books, 1963). No ISBN. Belmont #90–275. Australian edition: Horwitz, 1963. Seven tales selected from The Opener of the Way and Pleasant Dreams: Nightmares
- Bogey Men (Pyramid Books, March 1963) [ISBN unspecified]; Pyramid F-839. Includes as afterword, a reprint of the essay "Psycho-Logical Bloch" by Sam Moskowitz.
- The Skull of the Marquis de Sade and Other Stories (NY: Pyramid, 1965, pb; UK: Robert Hale, 1975, hc).
- Tales in a Jugular Vein (Pyramid Books, 1965) No ISBN – R-1130 on spine.
- Chamber of Horrors (Award Books, 1966) [ISBN unspecified]; Award Books A187X.
- The Living Demons (NY: Belmont Books, Sept 1967). No ISBN – Belmont B50-787.
- Dragons and Nightmares: Four Short Novels (Mirage, 1968). No ISBN. Voyager series V-102. 1000 numbered copies. Note: All included stories were revised from their original magazine publications for their appearance here.
- Bloch and Bradbury (NY: Tower Books, 1969). Edited by Kurt Singer. Contains six stories by Bloch & five by Ray Bradbury. Retitled reprint, UK: Sphere, 1970, as Fever Dream and Other Fantasies. ISBN 9780722117149; Retitled reprint, large magazine format, possibly unauthorised, Chicago: Peacock Press,1969 as Whispers from Beyond. No ISBN.
- Fear Today, Gone Tomorrow (Award Books/Tandem Books, 1971). No ISBN Award/Tandem 426 & A811S on spine; AQ 1469 on front cover.
- House of the Hatchet (Panther Books, UK, 1976). Collection of 11 stories; the second half of the two-volume paperback reissue of The Opener of the Way. Not to be confused with UK re-titles under this name by Tandem and Sphere of the US 1962 Belmont collection (9 stories) whose contents are almost entirely different.
- The King of Terrors: Tales of Madness and Death (The Mysterious Press, 1977). ISBN 0-89296-029-9 (trade ed); 0-89296-030-2 (limited ed).
- The Best of Robert Bloch (Del Rey/Ballantine, 1977). ISBN 0-345-25757-X. Introduction by Lester Del Rey.
- Cold Chills (Doubleday, 1977). ISBN 0-385-12421-X.
- Out of the Mouths of Graves (Mysterious Press, 1978) ISBN 0-89296-043-4 (trade ed); 0-89296-044-2 (limited ed).
- The Laughter of a Ghoul/What Every Young Ghoul Should Know (Necronomicon Press, 1978).
- Pleasant Dreams (HBJ/Jove pbk, 1979). A variant edition/title of 1960's Pleasant Dreams - Nightmares which omits four stories from the Arkham House collection and adds three others.
- Such Stuff as Screams Are Made Of (Ballantine Books, 1979) ISBN 0-345-27996-4.
- Mysteries of the Worm (Zebra Books, 1981). ISBN 0-89083-815-1. Introduction "Demon-Dreaded Lore" by Lin Carter. Afterword by Robert Bloch.
- Midnight Pleasures (Doubleday, 1987) ISBN 0-385-19439-0.
- Lost in Space and Time with Lefty Feep (Creatures at Large Press, 1987). ISBN 0-940064-03-0 (trade ed); 0-940064-01-4 (boxed/deluxe ed, 250 copies signed). Cover art by Kenn Davis Note: This book was designated "Volume One" but in fact no further volumes of the series were published, leaving a number of the Lefty Feep stories uncollected.
- Selected Stories of Robert Bloch (Underwood-Miller, 1987, 3 vols).

Note: The following three entries represent paperback reprints of the Underwood Miller Selected Stories set. Complete Stories is a misnomer as these three volumes do not contain anywhere near the complete oeuvre of Bloch's short fiction.

- The Complete Stories of Robert Bloch: Volume 1: Final Reckonings (1987).
- The Complete Stories of Robert Bloch: Volume 2: Bitter Ends (1987).
- The Complete Stories of Robert Bloch: Volume 3: Last Rites (1987).
- Fear and Trembling (1989).
- Mysteries of the Worm (rev. 1993) from Chaosium books. Adds three additional stories not included in the first edition.
- The Early Fears (1994). Fedogan & Bremer. ISBN 1-878252-12-7 (trade ed); 1-878252-13-5 (limited ed). Combines the contents of The Opener of the Way (1945) and Pleasant Dreams: Nightmares (1960) with three new stories and intro by the author.
- Flowers from the Moon and Other Lunacies (Arkham House, 1998) ISBN 0-87054-172-2. Introduction by Robert M. Price. Collects rarities from the Bloch canon, previously published in Weird Tales, Strange Stories and Rogue magazines; of its 20 stories, 15 are not readily obtainable outside the original pulps where they appeared.
- The Lost Bloch: Volume 1: The Devil With You! (Subterranean Press, 1999) ISBN 1-892284-19-7. (Limited ed of 724 numbered copies signed by editor/introducer David J. Schow and Foreword writer Stefan Dziemaniowicz). Includes interview with Bloch, "An Hour with Robert Bloch" conducted by David J. Schow. One of the stories included is "The Big Binge" (originally in Imaginative Tales in 1955 and reprinted as the short novel It's All in Your Mind in 1971, see above). The Lost Bloch supplements Flowers from the Moon in reprinting rare and unreprinted Bloch stories; however at early 2011 around 50 Bloch stories remain uncollected
- The Lost Bloch: Volume 2: Hell on Earth (2000). ISBN 1-892284-63-4. (Limited ed of 1250 numbered copies signed by editor/introducer David J. Schow and Foreword writer Douglas E. Winter). Includes afterword by Schow and interview "Slightly More than Another Hour with Robert Bloch" by J. Michael Straczynski.
- The Lost Bloch: Volume 3: Crimes and Punishments (Subterranean Press, 2002) ISBN 1-931081-16-6. (Limited ed 750 numbered copies signed by editor/introducer David J. Schow). Includes introductory piece by Gahan Wilson, interview "Three Hours and Then Some with Robert Bloch" by Douglas E. Winter and "My Husband, Robert Bloch" by Eleanor Bloch.
- The Reader's Bloch: Volume 1: The Fear Planet and Other Unusual Destinations (Subterranean Press, 2005; limited ed, signed by editor, 750 numbered and 26 lettered copies). Edited by Stefan R. Dziemanowicz, who provides an introduction, "Future Imperfect". Collects more Bloch rarities; most of its 20 stories are science fiction, and are otherwise unobtainable outside their original magazine appearances.
- The Reader's Bloch: Volume 2: Skeleton in the Closet and Other Stories (Subterranean Press, 2008; 750 numbered copies signed by the editor). Edited by Stefan R. Dziemanowicz. No intro. An unthemed collection of Bloch rarities, most of whose 16 stories are otherwise unobtainable outside their original magazine appearances.
- Mysteries of the Worm (Chaosium, rev. 2009) ISBN 1-56882-176-X. Preface "De Vermis Mysteriis" by Robert M. Price. Includes original Introduction by Lin Carter and After Word by Robert Bloch. Adds four additional stories not included in the first two editions.

=== Anthologies and collections edited by Bloch ===
- The Best of Fredric Brown (Nelson Doubleday, 1976). No ISBN. Book Club ed. 3180 on rear jacket flap.
- Psycho-Paths. (Tor, 1991). ISBN 0-312-85048-4.
- Monsters in Our Midst (Tor, 1993). ISBN 0-312-85049-2.
- Robert Bloch's Psychos (1997). ISBN 1-56865-637-8. This anthology was being edited by Robert Bloch until his death in 1994. Martin H. Greenberg completed the editorial work posthumously.

=== Short stories ===
- "The Thing" (parodying the style of H. P. Lovecraft), the author's first. Initially published in The Quill, his Lincoln High School literary magazine, in April, 1932; published in book form by The Pretentious Press in 1993.
- "Broomstick Ride", Super Science Fiction, December 1957
- "Crime Machine", Galaxy, October 1961
- "Sales of a Deathman", Galaxy, February 1968
- "From Hell", Gotham by Gaslight, February 1989

=== Non-fiction ===
- The Eighth Stage of Fandom (1962). Advent – no ISBN. Wildside Press reprint, 1992, with new intro by Wilson Tucker and new afterword by Harlan Ellison, ISBN 1-880448-16-5
- Out of My Head (1986) (essays). NESFA Press. ISBN 0-915368-30-7 (trade ed); 0-915368-87-0 (slipcased ed). Edition limited to 800 numbered copies, the first 200 being slipcased.
- Once Around the Bloch: An Unauthorized Autobiography (Tor Books, 1993).
- Robert Bloch: Appreciations of the Master (Tor, 1995). This volume is a tribute to Bloch collecting essays by many writers who knew or worked with him, together with reprints of several Bloch stories.

== Awards ==
Year	Award	Category	Work	Result	Ref.
1959	Hugo Award	Short Story	That Hell-Bound Train	Won	
1959	E. Everett Evans "Big Heart" Memorial Award	for Fantasy and Science Fiction Work		Won	
1973	Science Fiction and Fantasy Writers Association	Toastmaster Award		Won	
1974	LASFS Forry Award	Life Achievement Award (named in honor of Forrest J Ackerman)		Won	
1975	World Fantasy Award	Life Achievement Award		Won	
1975	Inkpot Award	For prose writing		Won	
1978	World Fantasy Award	Collection	Cold Chills	Nominated	
1978	Hugo Award	Best Dramatic Presentation	Blood!: The Life and Future Times of Jack the Ripper (Alternate World Recordings	Nominated	
1979	Balrog Awards	Novel	Strange Eons	Nominated	
1981	Balrog Awards	Collection/Anthology	Mysteries of the Worm	Nominated	
1983	British Fantasy Award	August Derleth Award	Psycho II	Nominated	
1983	Special Committee Award, LAcon II	50 years as an SF Professional		Won	>
1985	First Fandom Hall of Fame award (presented at the Hugo Awards)	For contributions to the field of science fiction.		Won	
1987	Bram Stoker Award	Fiction Collection	Midnight Pleasures	Nominated	
1989	Locus Award	Collection	Final Reckonings	Nominated	
1990	Bram Stoker Award	Lifetime Achievement		Won	
1991	World Horror Convention Grand Master Award	For contributing greatly to the field of horror literature.		Won	
1993	Bram Stoker Award	Non-Fiction	Once Around the Bloch: An Unauthorized Autobiography	Won	
1994	Bram Stoker Award	Fiction Collection	The Early Fears	Won	
1994	Bram Stoker Award	Long Fiction	The Scent of Vinegar	Won	
1994	Hugo Award	Best Related Work	Once Around the Bloch: An Unauthorized Autobiography	Nominated	
1995	Locus Award	Collection	The Early Fears	Nominated	
1995	World Fantasy Award	Collection	The Early Fears	Nominated	
1998	Bram Stoker Award	Anthology	Robert Bloch's Psychos	Nominated	
2019	Hugo Award	Retro Hugos: Short Story	Yours Truly - Jack the Ripper	Nominated	
2019	Rondo Hatton Classic Horror Awards	Monster Kid Hall of Fame: Author		Won	

Other awards:

- 1960: Ann Radcliffe Award for Literature (Count Dracula Society) The Count Dracula Society was founded by Dr Donald A. Reed, who also founded the Academy of Science Fiction, Fantasy and Horror Films.
- 1960: Edgar Allan Poe Award (Special Scroll) (for Psycho) Mystery Writers of America
- 1960: Screenwriter's Annual Award nominated by Screenwriter's Guild (for Psycho)
- 1965: Third Trieste Film Festival Award (for The Skull)
- 1966: Ann Radcliffe Award for Television (Count Dracula Society)
- 1973: First prize, La 2de Convention Du Cinema Fantastique De Paris (for Asylum)
- 1974: Award for Service to the Field of Science Fantasy Los Angeles Science Fiction Society
- 1978: Fritz Leiber Fantasy Award
- 1979: Reims Festival Award
- 1984: Hugo Special Award for 50 years as a science fiction professional

See also 42nd World Science Fiction Convention

- 1984: Lifetime Career Award, Atlanta Fantasy Fair
- 1985: Twilight Zone Dimension Award
- Special award at the first NecronomiCon. (After his death, this award was renamed in his honor).

Guest of Honorships: [For further details on these conventions see

- 1948 - Torcon 1
- 1971 - DCON 1971
- 1973 - Torcon 2
- 1975 - BYOB-Con 5 and First World Fantasy Convention
- 1977 - Clayton Con
- 1978 - Loscon 5, Luncaon 21, Rivercon IV, Fantasy Faire VIII, Coscon 5,
- 1979 - Unicon 5
- 1980 - Archon 4
- 1981 - Cinecon (Australia)
- 1982 - TusCon 9 and Archon 6.
- 1983 - World Fantasy Convention 1983
- 1985 - Tropicon 4, VCON 13, Necronomicon '85, X-Con 9
- 1986 - Boskone 23, TusCon 13
- 1987 - DeepSouthCon 25
- 1989 - MileHiCon 21 and OKon 12
- 1990 - 16th World Fantasy Convention
- 1992 - Rhinocon 2 and Arcana 22
- 1993 - NecronomiCon, 1st edition
- 2003 - Torcon 3 (Ghost of Honor)

== Films ==
The following is a list of films based on Bloch's work. For some of these he wrote the original screenplay; for others, he supplied the story or a novel (as in the case of Psycho) on which the screenplay was based.

Year	Title	Notes
1960	Psycho	Director: Alfred Hitchcock. Based on Bloch's original novel but scripted by Joseph Stefano.
1962	The Couch	Director: Owen Crump. Screenplay by Bloch, based on a story by Blake Edwards and director Owen Crump. Bloch later novelized his own screenplay. Starring Grant Williams and Shirley Knight.
1962	The Cabinet of Caligari	Director: Roger Kay. The story of how director Roger Kay tried to rob Bloch of the writing credit for the film and of how Bloch won out is told in Bloch's autobiography. Starring Glynis Johns and Dan O'Herlihy.
1964	Strait-Jacket	Director: William Castle. Original screenplay by Bloch. The first of his two screenplays for director William Castle. Starring Joan Crawford and Diane Baker.
1964	The Night Walker	Director: William Castle. Original screenplay by Bloch. The second of two screenplays for director William Castle. The screenplay was later novelized by Sidney Stuart (a pseudonym of Michael Avallone), with an introduction by Bloch. (The Night Walker, Award Books, Dec 1964. [ISBN unspecified]; Award KA124F). Starring Robert Taylor and Barbara Stanwyck.
1965	The Skull	Director: Freddie Francis. The first of Bloch's six films made for Amicus Productions. Based on Bloch's story The Skull of the Marquis de Sade but scripted by Milton Subotsky.
1966	The Psychopath	Director: Freddie Francis. 2nd of Bloch's Amicus films. Original screenplay by Bloch. Starring Patrick Wymark.
1967	The Deadly Bees	Director: Freddie Francis. 3rd of Bloch's Amicus films. Screenplay by Bloch based on Gerald Heard's A Taste of Honey. Starring Suzanna Leigh.
1967	Torture Garden	Director: Freddie Francis. 4th of Bloch's Amicus films. Screenplay by Bloch based on four of his stories, including The Man Who Collected Poe (about Edgar Allan Poe). Starring Jack Palance and Burgess Meredith.
1971	The House That Dripped Blood	Director: Peter Duffell. 5th of Bloch's Amicus films. Screenplay by Bloch based on four of his stories (except that Russ Jones adapted Waxworks, uncredited). Starring Christopher Lee and Peter Cushing.
1971	Journey to Midnight	[TV movie] Director: Roy Ward Baker. This was one of four "fix-up" films which twinned episodes from the 1968–69 British TV anthology series Journey to the Unknown, produced by Hammer for screening as TV movies in the USA. These "fix-up" TV movies had new segment introduction footage provided by actors Patrick McGoohan, Sebastian Cabot and Joan Crawford serving as hosts; Cabot provided the intro segment for Journey to Midnight. Bloch's contribution was "The Indian Spirit Guide" alongside a non-Bloch episode, "Poor Butterfly".
1972	Asylum	Director: Roy Ward Baker. 6th and final of Bloch's Amicus films. Screenplay by Bloch based on four of his stories. The screenplay was novelized by William Johnston (Asylum, Bantam Books, Dec 1972. [ISBN unspecified]; Bantam 9195). Note: Bloch's story "Lucy Comes to Stay", one of the four stories incorporated in the film can be found reprinted in Peter Haining (ed) Ghost Movies: Classics of the Supernatural, Severn House, 1995 as "Asylum". Starring Peter Cushing and Britt Ekland.
1973	The Cat Creature	[TV movie] Director: Curtis Harrington. Original teleplay by Bloch, based upon a story by himself, Douglas S. Cramer and Wilfred Lloyd Baumes. The first of his two teleplays for director Harrington. Starring Meredith Baxter, David Hedison, Gale Sondergaard, John Carradine, Keye Luke, Kent Smith, John Abbott, Stuart Whitman and "Peter Lorre Jr." (actually Eugene Weingand, an unrelated imposter once taken to court by Lorre for illegal use of his name).
1975	The Dead Don't Die	[TV movie] Director: Curtis Harrington. Teleplay by Bloch based on his story which first appeared in Fantastic Adventures in July 1951. The second of his two teleplays for director Harrington. Starring Ray Milland, George Hamilton and Joan Blondell.
1978	The Return of Captain Nemo	[TV miniseries] Director: Alex March. Also released theatrically as The Amazing Captain Nemo. Bloch penned one episode,"Atlantis Dead Ahead", in collaboration with Larry Alexander. Starring José Ferrer and Burgess Meredith.
1998	Psycho	Director: Gus Van Sant. A remake of the Hitchcock film based on Bloch's original novel.

=== Unproduced screenplays ===
Bloch wrote a number of screenplays that remain unproduced. These include Merry-Go-Round for MGM (loosely based on Ray Bradbury's story "Black Ferris"); Night-World (from Bloch's novel, for MGM; this was aborted when its producer lost confidence, and his job when MGM went under new management); "The Twenty-First Witch"; Day of the Comet (from the H. G. Wells story) and "Berg!" (both for George Pal); and a television adaptation of "Out of the Aeons". See also The Todd Dossier. Other unproduced scripts include a science fiction movie commissioned by AIP for 1972 release, Barracuda 2000 A.D. (about a cycle gang surviving atomic holocaust in 2000); James Whiton (co-writer of The Abominable Dr. Phibes) also worked on Bloch's script but AIP abandoned the film when the bottom fell out of the cycle-picture vogue. There was also Linda, based on a John D. MacDonald novella; Bloch's script was not used but the movie was eventually done in another form on TV as a 1973 ABC Saturday Suspense Movie starring Stella Stevens, with Ed Nelson playing Paul and John McIntire.

Some scenes from Bloch's incomplete screenplay for the unproduced movie Earthman's Burden, to have been based on the Hoka stories of Gordon R. Dickson and Poul Anderson, appear in Richard Matheson and Ricia Mainhardt, eds., Robert Bloch: Appreciations of the Master. New York: Tor Books, 1995, pp. 157–63.

== In media ==
Bloch appeared in the documentary The Fantasy Film Worlds of George Pal (1985) produced and directed by Arnold Leibovit.

Ethan Sandler portrayed Bloch in the television series Monster: The Ed Gein Story.

== Robert Bloch Collection, University of Wyoming ==
Many of Bloch's published works, manuscripts (including those of the novels The Star Stalker, This Crowded Earth, and Night World), correspondence, books, recordings, tapes and other memorabilia are housed in the Special Collections division of the library at the University of Wyoming. The collection includes several unpublished short stories, such as "Dream Date", "The Last Clown", "A Pretty Girl is Like a Malady", "Twilight of a God", "It Only Hurts When I Laugh", "How to Pull the Wings Off a Barfly", "The Craven Image", "Afternoon in the Park", "Title Bout", and 'What Freud Can't Tell You".

In addition, there is an unpublished one-act play entitled The Birth of a Notion – A Tragedy of Hollywood. Thousands of other items from fanzines and professional periodicals to film stills, lobby cards, one-sheets and posters and press-books connected with Bloch's films, together with transcripts of several of his speeches, are also housed in the collection.

== General and cited references ==
- Bloch, Robert (1993). Once Around the Bloch: An Unauthorized Autobiography. Tor Books. ISBN 978-0-312-85373-0.
