= That Hell-Bound Train =

- Short story by Robert Bloch
- Country: United States
- Language: English
- Genre: Dark fantasy short story

Publication
- Published in: The Magazine of Fantasy & Science Fiction
- Publication type: Periodical
- Publisher: Mercury Publications
- Media type: Print (Magazine Softcover)
- Publication date: September 1958
- Pages: 12
- Award: Hugo Award for Best Short Story (1959)

"That Hell-Bound Train" is a dark fantasy short story by American writer Robert Bloch. It was originally published in The Magazine of Fantasy & Science Fiction in September 1958.

== Plot summary ==
Martin is a young hobo with a fondness for trains. One night, as he is considering whether to abandon crime, a large unmarked black train pulls up beside him. The train conductor offers Martin anything he wants, in return for which he will "ride that Hell-Bound Train" when he dies. Martin requests the power to stop time, which he plans to use at the happiest time of his life. The conductor accedes to this request; however, over the years that follow, Martin discovers that he cannot choose which moment is his happiest. In the end, he dies, never having stopped time, and indeed boards the train. However, he likes the sinful look of the passengers and chooses to stop time then and there. The train never reaches the depot and Martin, now the brakeman, finally finds happiness.

== Reception ==
"That Hell-Bound Train" won the Hugo Award for Best Short Story in 1959. Comic Book Resources has described it as "a classic deal-with-the-devil tale with a nice twist at the end".

The story was shaped by William Tenn, who at the time had an editorial position at Fantasy and Science Fiction salvaging stories that had been selected by Anthony Boucher (prior to Boucher's retirement) as "not quite good enough to be published, but still too good to have been rejected". In 2001, Tenn explained that the original version of "That Hell-Bound Train" had been "an absolutely fine piece of work that just didn't have a usable ending"; consequently, he devised a new ending "and persuaded [Bloch] to write it".

== In other media ==
A comic book version of the story began publication on May 15, 2011. The adaptation was written by Joe R. Lansdale and John Lansdale, with art by Dave Wachter. Running for three issues, it was published by IDW Comics.

The song "Hellbound Train (Downbound Train)" by Chuck Berry is about a similar train.

Hungarian rock band P. Mobil made a song called "Hellbound Train" (Pokolba tartó vonat) in 1977, that inspired by the short story.

A dramatized radio version was broadcast on Mindwebs, narrated by Michael Hanson.

An opera adaptation of the story is currently in production by composer Lisa DeSpain and librettist David Simpatico.

== See also ==
- Faust
