= Lila Crane =

Fictional character created by Robert Bloch in the novel Psycho

- Psycho character
- Vera Miles as Lila Crane in Psycho (1960)
- First appearance: Psycho (1959)
- Last appearance: Psycho II (1982)
- Created by: Robert Bloch
- Portrayed by: Vera Miles (Psycho (1960), Psycho II (1983)); Julianne Moore (Psycho (1998))

In-universe information
- Gender: Female
- Family: Marion Crane (deceased sister); Mary Loomis (deceased daughter; film canon only)
- Spouse: Sam Loomis (deceased husband)

Lila Loomis (née Crane) is a fictional character created by American author Robert Bloch in his 1959 thriller novel Psycho; she is the sister of Norman Bates's victim Marion Crane. She is revealed as the real protagonist of the novel in the final chapters, after several false protagonists, including her sister, who gets murdered. Lila is portrayed by Vera Miles in the 1960 film version (directed by Alfred Hitchcock) and by Julianne Moore in the 1998 version. Additionally, Lila appears in Bloch's 1982 sequel novel Psycho II, and the unrelated 1983 sequel film of the same name, in which she serves as an antagonist.

== Fictional biography ==
Lila Crane is the younger sister of Marion Crane (Janet Leigh). After Marion steals $40,000 from her boss, George Lowery (Vaughn Taylor), Marion plans to run off from Phoenix, Arizona, to the (fictional) small town of Fairvale, California, where her boyfriend Sam Loomis (John Gavin) lives so she could marry him. Lila travels to Fairvale to meet Sam, hoping that Marion would be there with him and the money. She planned to convince Marion to return the money to her employer, so that he won't press charges. Upon arriving in Fairvale, she learns from Sam that he has not seen Marion for days; she has disappeared. Shortly after her arrival, a private investigator hired by Marion's employer, Milton Arbogast (Martin Balsam), also comes into contact with her and Sam.

Arbogast searches local hotels, eventually coming to the Bates Motel. After calling to update Lila and Sam about tracing Marion to the motel, he disappears as well. This prompts Sam and Lila to pose as a married couple in order to get a room at the motel to investigate without arousing the suspicion of the owner, Norman Bates (Anthony Perkins). Lila makes her way to Norman's house while Sam distracts him. When Norman realizes what Lila is up to, he knocks Sam unconscious and runs after her. When she enters the fruit cellar, she makes a ghastly discovery: the corpse of Norman's mother, whom Norman claimed was alive. A moment later, Norman enters dressed in his mother's clothes and a wig, wielding a kitchen knife. He attacks her, but Sam tackles him to the ground and disarms him. A psychiatrist later tells her that Norman — who murders people while under the control of an alternate personality taking the form of his mother, whom he murdered years earlier — killed her sister and Arbogast.

In Psycho II, Norman is released from the mental institution he was placed in at the end of the first film after 22 years. Lila (now Lila Loomis, having married Sam) petitions to keep Norman locked up; however, the petition is unsuccessful and Norman is released.

Norman gets a job at a local diner, where he meets a coworker, a young woman named Mary (Meg Tilly). Later, it is revealed that Mary is Lila's daughter, and that they are trying, by dressing up as Norman's mother and leaving notes and calls claiming to be her, to drive him insane and get him recommitted. While this is unfolding, Norman's motel manager and a teenage boy making out with a girl in Norman's fruit cellar are murdered by someone who looks like Norman in his "Mother" guise.

Later, Mary, who has grown to care about Norman, tells Lila that she is backing out of their plan. Lila angrily rebukes her daughter, and sneaks to Norman's fruit cellar to put on her "Mother" costume. In the process of doing so, she is murdered by the figure who appears to be "Mother". Mary is later killed in a standoff with police, who exonerate Norman. It is revealed later that Emma Spool (Claudia Bryar), Norman's maternal aunt, killed Lila and the others. Spool says that she is Norman's real mother, and that she killed people who had "wronged him". The following sequel reveals that she is in fact Norman's aunt, who has deluded herself into believing he is her child.

== Novels ==
The character of Lila Crane is basically the same, as is the plot events, in Robert Bloch's novel Psycho. However, the plots of Psycho II the book and Psycho II the movie are nothing alike. In the Psycho II novel, there are no mentioned plans of releasing Norman from the institution. Instead, he escapes and travels to Fairvale, intent on murdering Sam and Lila Loomis. The book's climax reveals that Norman was killed in a car accident before he could get to them, however, and that Sam and Lila were actually murdered by Norman's psychiatrist, Dr. Adam Claiborne, who assumed Norman's identity.

== Comic books ==
Lila appears in the 1992 three-issue comic book adaptation of the 1960 film Psycho, released by Innovation Publishing.

== Portrayals ==
Lila Crane/Loomis was portrayed by Vera Miles in the 1960 film Psycho and its 1983 sequel, Psycho II.

Julianne Moore portrayed the character in the 1998 remake.

== Appearances ==
=== Novels ===
- Psycho (1959)
- Psycho II (1982)
- Psycho House (1990, mentioned only)

=== Films ===
- Psycho (1960)
- Psycho II (1983)
- Psycho III (1986, mentioned only)
- Psycho (1998)

=== Comics ===
- Alfred Hitchcock's Psycho (1992)
