= Psycho II =

Psycho II can refer to:

- Psycho II (film), a 1983 film that follows the 1960 film Psycho
- Psycho II (novel), a 1982 novel that follows the 1959 novel Psycho
