= Law Lady =

Law Lady may refer to:

- A female Law Lord
  - Brenda Hale, Baroness Hale of Richmond, the only such female Law Lord
- "The Law Lady", 1955 episode of The Lone Ranger TV series

== See also ==
- The Law and the Lady (disambiguation)
- Lawman (disambiguation)
- Lady (disambiguation)
