= Norman Bates =

Fictional character from Psycho and Bates Motel

- Psycho character
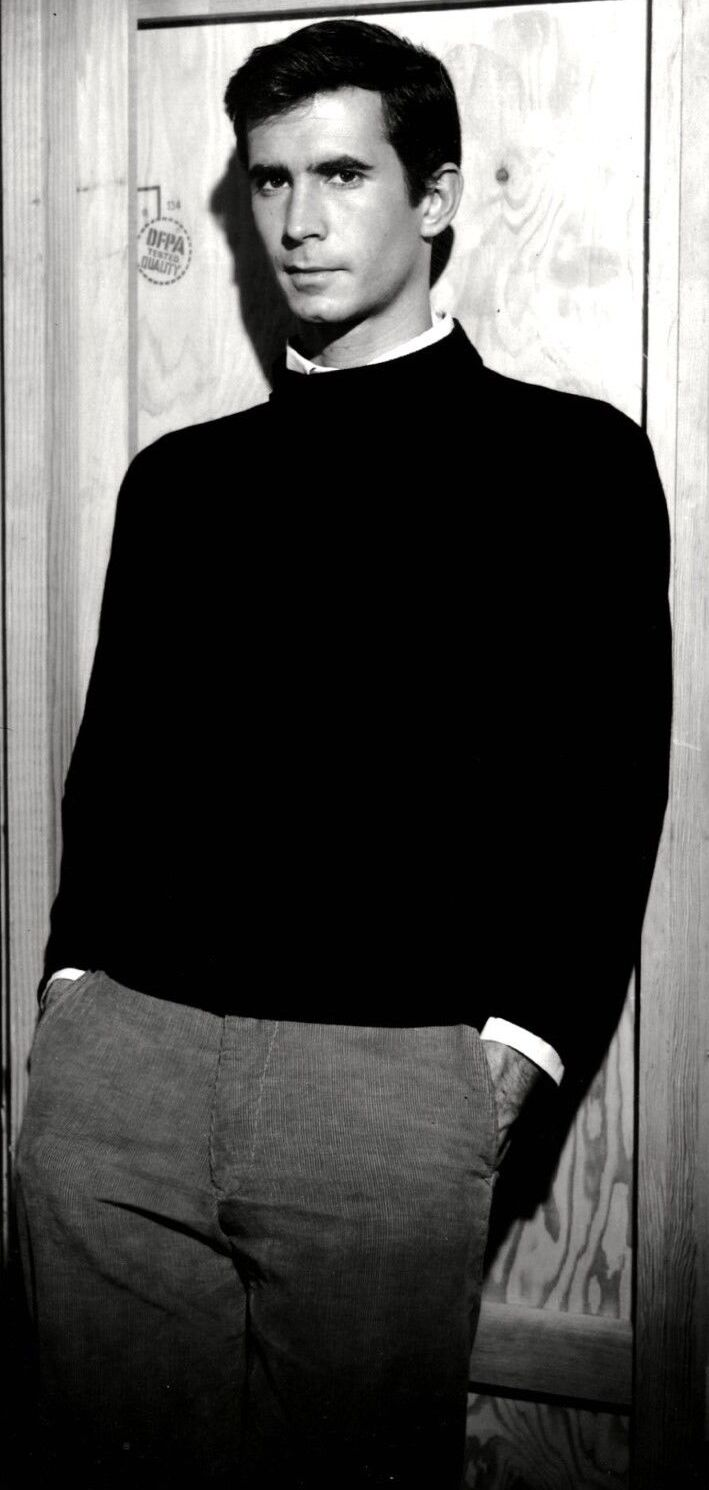
- Anthony Perkins as Norman Bates in a publicity photo for Psycho (1960)
- First appearance: Psycho (1959 novel)
- Last appearance: Psycho: Sanitarium (novel)
- Created by: Robert Bloch
- Portrayed by: Anthony Perkins (Psycho, II, III, IV); Kurt Paul (Bates Motel film); Vince Vaughn (1998 film); Freddie Highmore (TV series); Others: Oz Perkins (II, child); Ryan Finnigan (IV, child); Henry Thomas (IV, teenager); Beckham Skodje, Luke Roessler, Nicholas Holmes (TV series, child)

In-universe information
- Aliases: Mother; Robert Newman
- Gender: Male
- Occupation: Former owner of the Bates Motel
- Family: Norma Bates (mother; deceased); John/Sam Bates (Note: John Bates in the films Psycho II and Psycho III; Sam Bates in the Bates Motel TV series.) (father; deceased); Emma Spool (aunt deceased, films); Unborn child (films)
- Spouses: Dr. Constance "Connie" Forbes-Bates (wife, films)

Norman Bates is a fictional character created by American author Robert Bloch as the main antagonist in his 1959 horror novel Psycho, and later the protagonist of the Psycho franchise. He has an alter ego, Mother, who takes the form of his abusive mother, and later victim, Norma, who in his daily life runs the Bates Motel. He was portrayed by Anthony Perkins in the 1960 film adaptation directed by Alfred Hitchcock and in three sequels. He was also portrayed by Vince Vaughn in the 1998 remake, and by Freddie Highmore in the television series Bates Motel (2013–2017).

Unlike the franchise produced by Universal Studios, Norman is not the principal antagonist in Bloch's subsequent novels and is succeeded by copycat killers who assume Norman's identity after his death in Psycho II (1982), although he does return in the licensed continuation novel Psycho: Sanitarium (2016) by Chet Williamson.

There is a wide-ranging assumption that the character was directly inspired by the Wisconsin murderer Ed Gein. With Psycho being optioned for film adaptation as a direct result of media attention on Gein, Bloch later revealed he was inspired more by the circumstances surrounding Gein's case—the idea that "the man next door may be a monster unsuspected even in the gossip-ridden microcosm of small-town life." Years later, when the full details of Gein's crimes were revealed, he was struck by "how closely the imaginary character I'd created resembled the real Ed Gein both in overt act and apparent motivation."

== Character overview ==
Both the 1959 novel and its 1960 film adaptation explain that Norman suffered severe emotional abuse as a child at the hands of his mother, Norma, who preached to him that sexual intercourse was sinful and that all women (except herself) were whores. The novel also suggests that their relationship may have been incestuous.

After Norman's father died, Norman and his mother lived alone together "as if there was no one else in the world" until Norman was a teenager, when his mother met Joe Considine (Chet Rudolph in Psycho IV: The Beginning) and planned to marry. Considine eventually convinced Norma to open a motel. Driven over the edge with jealousy, Norman murdered both of them with strychnine. After committing the murders, Norman forged his mother's suicide note to make it look like she had killed Considine and then herself. After a brief hospitalization for shock, he developed a split personality, assuming his mother's personality to repress his awareness of her death and thus escape the guilt of murdering her. He inherited his mother's house—where he kept her corpse in the fruit cellar—and the motel in the fictional small town of Fairvale, California.

Norman's "Mother" personality is as cruel and possessive as the real Norma had been in life, frequently berating him and forbidding him to have a life outside of her. As "Mother", he dresses in Norma's clothes and talks to himself in her voice, and he also speaks to her corpse as if it is alive. "Mother" also kills women whom Norman feels attracted to, and anyone else who threatens the illusion of her existence. Norman passes out when "Mother" takes control; after "Mother" commits a murder, Norman awakens and destroys the evidence, convinced that "she" alone is responsible for the crime. Bloch sums up Norman's multiple personalities in his stylistic form of puns: "Norman", a child needing his mother; "Norma", a controlling, mean-spirited parent figure; and "Normal", a functional adult who goes through the motions of day-to-day life.

== Psycho (novel and film) ==
In Bloch's 1959 novel and the 1960 Hitchcock film, Marion Crane (Janet Leigh, Mary Crane in the novel), a young woman on the run after stealing money from her employer, checks into the motel one night. Norman is smitten with her, and shyly asks her to have dinner with him in the house. "Mother" flies into a rage and threatens to kill Marion if Norman lets her in the house. The latter defies her and eats dinner with Marion anyway, but lashes out at her when she suggests that he institutionalize his mother. When Marion goes to her room to shower, Norman spies on her through a peephole he drilled in the wall. "Mother" takes control and stabs Marion to death (he beheads her in the novel). When Norman awakes to discover what he believes his mother has done, he sinks Marion's car—with her corpse and the money in the trunk—into a nearby swamp. As "Mother", he also murders Milton Arbogast (Martin Balsam), a private detective hired by Marion's employer, days later.

Norman is finally caught when Marion's sister Lila (Vera Miles) and boyfriend, Sam Loomis (John Gavin), arrive at the motel looking for her. When Norman figures out what they want, he knocks Sam out and goes running after Lila, who has reached the house and found Mrs. Bates' corpse. He attacks her as "Mother", but Sam, after coming to, overpowers him, and Norman is finally arrested for murdering Marion and two other missing women. Norman is declared insane and sent to an institution, where "Mother" takes complete, and permanent, control of his mind: he becomes his mother.

== Novel sequels ==
=== Psycho II ===
In Bloch's 1982 sequel to his first novel, Psycho II, Norman escapes from the psychiatric hospital by killing one of two visiting nuns and donning her habit. He steals their van and kills then rapes the corpse of the second nun. Norman plans to find and kill both Sam Loomis and his wife Lila (Lila Crane sister of Mary or Marion Crane) who he believes are responsible for his incarceration but first he needs to fake his death. He notices a hitchhiker and decides to kill him and fake his own death. Unbeknown to Norman the hitchhiker is planning to attack this nun and steal her van. Norman tries to attack his passenger but is overpowered. This in turn causes a fiery accident where the hitchhiker escapes, but Norman dies. Meanwhile, Dr. Adam Claiborne, who discovered Norman's corpse, assumes his personality and goes on a killing spree.

=== Psycho House ===
In Bloch's 1991 sequel to his second novel, Psycho House, Norman appears only as a novelty animatronic on display in the Bates Motel, which has been converted into a tourist attraction.

=== Psycho: Sanitarium ===
In the 2016 authorized novel Psycho: Sanitarium by Chet Williamson which takes place between Robert Bloch's novels Psycho and Psycho II, it follows Norman Bates in the institute following the events of the original Psycho novel. He is under the care of Dr. Felix Reed, and there is an apparent revelation that Norman has a twin brother named Robert Newman who was separated from birth. It is revealed that Robert Newman was another split persona of Norman, manifested through manipulations by Felix Reed to try and have the mental health system overhauled. Norman ends up killing Felix Reed and subsequently falls into a catatonic state due to the trauma.

== Film sequels ==
=== Psycho II ===
In 1983's Psycho II, the first sequel to the original film, Norman is released from the institution twenty-two years after his arrest, seemingly cured. Sam Loomis has died at this point. Norman meets Mary Samuels (Meg Tilly)—later revealed to be Mary Loomis, Lila and Sam Loomis's daughter and Marion Crane's niece—and falls in love with her. However, a series of mysterious murders occurs, as well as strange appearances and messages from his mother, and Norman slowly loses his grip on sanity. The mysterious appearances and messages turn out to be a plot by Lila to drive him insane again in order to get him recommitted. The actual murders turn out to be the work of Norman's coworker, Emma Spool (Claudia Bryar). Before Norman discovers this, however, Mary Loomis is shot dead by the police during a confrontation with Norman, and Mrs. Spool murders Lila. When Spool tells Norman that she is his real mother, he kills her and embalms her corpse while assuming the "Mother" personality once again.

=== Psycho III ===
In 1986's Psycho III, set a month later, Norman continues to struggle, unsuccessfully, against "Mother's" dominion. He also finds another love interest named Maureen Coyle (Diana Scarwid), who eventually dies at "Mother's" hand. In the film, Mrs. Spool's corpse is first discovered by sleazy musician Duane Duke (Jeff Fahey), whom Norman kills when Duke tries to use the discovery to blackmail Norman. Tracy Venable (Roberta Maxwell), a reporter interested in Norman's case, finds out that Spool was in fact Norman's aunt—Norma Bates' sister—who was in love with Norman's father and killed him when he chose Norma over her. She then kidnapped the child Norman, believing him to be her own, but she was arrested and institutionalized, leaving Norman to be raised by Norma. "Mother" orders Norman to kill Tracy, but in the end he destroys Spool's corpse, attempting to break free of her control. He is then arrested and put back in the institution.

=== Psycho IV: The Beginning ===
Psycho IV: The Beginning (1990), the final film in the series, retcons the revelations of the second film and third film, supplying that Norman's father was stung to death by bees and removing all references to Emma Spool. In this film, Norman has been released from an institution, and is married to one of the hospital's psychologists, a woman named Connie (Donna Mitchell). When his wife becomes pregnant, he lures her to his mother's house and tries to kill her, wanting to prevent another of his "cursed" line from being born into the world; the film implies that Mrs. Bates (Olivia Hussey) suffered from schizophrenia and borderline personality disorder and passed the illnesses on to her son. However, he relents at the last minute, when Connie professes her love for him. He then burns the house down in an attempt to free himself of his past. During the attempt, he is tormented by hallucinations of "Mother" and several of his victims, becoming injured in a fall. He almost dies in the flames before willing himself to get out, apparently defeating his illness at long last; he is finally free of his mother's voice, which demands to be let out. This was Anthony Perkins' final performance as Norman Bates; Henry Thomas portrayed Norman as a teenager.

== Television ==
=== Bates Motel (film) ===
In the 1987 television spin-off movie and series pilot Bates Motel, Norman is never released from the institution after his first incarceration. He befriends Alex West (Bud Cort), a fellow inmate who had murdered his stepfather, and wills ownership of the titular motel to him before dying of old age.

=== Bates Motel (TV series) ===
The television series Bates Motel, a 2013 reboot to the 1960 film Psycho, set in the present day, depicts the young Norman Bates' life with his mother, Norma (Vera Farmiga). In this continuity, Norman has hallucinations and blackouts, and begins manifesting his "Mother" personality while Norma is alive. He kills his abusive father, Sam (David Cubitt), while in a dissociative state, and Norma moves them from Arizona, where he was born and raised, to White Pine Bay, Oregon, to protect him. The series also introduces his maternal half-brother, Dylan Massett (Max Thieriot) and gives him a love interest in Emma Decody (Olivia Cooke), a classmate with cystic fibrosis.

As "Mother", Norman murders Blaire Watson (Keegan Connor Tracy), one of his teachers who seduces him; Bradley Martin (Nicola Peltz), a girl he has feelings for; and Audrey Ellis Decody (Karina Logue), Emma's estranged mother. Fearing for his sanity, Norma briefly has him committed to a mental institution. While there, Norman recovers a memory of witnessing his father rape Norma in a drunken rage after she tried to leave him; it is implied that this trauma fractured his psyche.

When Norman's sanity begins to deteriorate, Norma marries the town sheriff, Alex Romero (Nestor Carbonell), so she can use his insurance coverage to pay for Norman's treatment. While the marriage is at first merely a financial arrangement, they eventually fall in love. After Norman is released from the institution and finds out that Norma is married, he grows insanely jealous and tries to kill both Norma and himself by flooding the house with carbon monoxide while his mother sleeps. Romero arrives at the house in time to revive Norman, but finds that Norma is already dead. Romero figures out what happened and swears revenge, but is arrested for perjury before he can do anything. Meanwhile, Norman cannot bear losing his mother, so he digs up her corpse and assumes her personality to preserve the illusion of her being alive.

Two years later, Norman is running the motel and living alone in the house with Norma's corpse, which he keeps frozen and preserved in the cellar. He and his "Mother" personality live together as if there is no one else in the world, and she takes care of his problems - such as killing and disposing of a hitman sent by Romero and helping him get rid of his uncle, Norma's brother Caleb (Kenny Johnson), after he discovers the truth. Norman falls for Madeline Loomis (Isabelle McNally), a lonely woman who bears an uncanny resemblance to Norma, and whose husband Sam (Austin Nichols) is cheating on her. "Mother" becomes jealous and starts behaving erratically, at one point taking possession of Norman's mind and making him have sex with a man at a gay bar while dressed in Norma's clothes. Norman finally begins to suspect that "Mother" is not real, and she confirms that he created her in his mind to deal with things that he could not, such as his abusive father. When Sam's mistress Marion Crane (Rihanna) checks into the motel, Norman has dinner with her and tells her that Sam is married. Marion comes back to the motel after confirming Sam's infidelity, and seeks comfort from Norman. He fears that "Mother" will kill her, however, and tells her to leave and never come back. When Sam comes to the motel to look for Marion, Norman stabs him to death in the shower.

Dylan comes to see Norman after learning of Norma's death, and they get into a fight that ends with Norman assaulting his half-brother at "Mother's" instigation. Terrified of what he might do, Norman calls 911 and confesses to murdering Sam. While he is in jail, Sheriff Jane Greene (Brooke Smith) finds the bodies of Norman's other victims, and charges him with their murders, as well. While Norman is awaiting trial, Romero—who had earlier escaped from prison—breaks into his cell and takes him hostage. They drive to the woods where Norman hid Norma's corpse after the police began searching his house. There, Norman gets the better of Romero and shoots him dead, but not before his former stepfather tells him he will never escape from murdering his own mother. When Norman finally admits to himself that he killed Norma, "Mother" appears to him and tells him she is leaving, as there is no longer anything she can protect him from. Now completely alone, Norman loses all contact with reality. He calls Dylan and invites him over for a "family dinner", complete with Norma's corpse seated at the head of the table. When Dylan tells him that Norma is dead, Norman flies into a rage and attacks him with a knife, forcing Dylan to shoot him in self-defense. As he dies, Norman sees a vision of his mother embracing him.

== Characterization ==
The character Norman Bates in Psycho was loosely based on two people. First was the real-life murderer Ed Gein, about whom Bloch later wrote a fictionalized account, "The Shambles of Ed Gein", in 1962. (The story can be found in Crimes and Punishments: The Lost Bloch, Volume 3). Second, it has been indicated by several people, including Noel Carter (wife of Lin Carter) and Chris Steinbrunner, as well as allegedly by Bloch himself, that Norman Bates was partly based on Calvin Beck, publisher of Castle of Frankenstein.

The characterization of Norman Bates in the novel and the movie differ in some key areas. In the novel, Norman is fortysomething, short, overweight, balding and homely. In the movie, he is in his late twenties, tall, slender, handsome and with a full set of hair. Reportedly, when working on the film, Hitchcock decided that he wanted audiences to be able to sympathize with Norman and genuinely like the character, so he made him more of a "boy next door". In the novel, Norman becomes "Mother" after getting drunk and passing out; in the movie, he remains sober before switching personalities. In the novel, Norman is well-read in occult and esoteric authors such as P.D. Ouspensky and Aleister Crowley. He is aware that "Mother" disapproves of these authors as being against religion.

== Portrayals ==
Norman Bates was portrayed by Anthony Perkins in Hitchcock's seminal 1960 film adaptation of Bloch's novel and its three sequels. Perkins hosted an episode of Saturday Night Live in 1976 in which he performed numerous sketches portraying Norman, including the instructional video "The Norman Bates School of Motel Management". He also portrayed Norman, albeit more lightheartedly, in a 1990 commercial for Oatmeal Crisp cereal. Vince Vaughn portrayed Norman in Gus Van Sant's 1998 version of Psycho, while Kurt Paul, Perkins' "Mother" stunt double in Psycho II and Psycho III, took on the role in the made-for-TV film spin-off Bates Motel. Perkins' son Oz portrayed a younger version of Norman in Psycho II. Henry Thomas played a younger version of the character in Psycho IV: The Beginning. Freddie Highmore portrayed Norman in the TV series Bates Motel, with Vera Farmiga portraying both Norman's mother Norma and his murderous split personality "Mother". For his performance, Highmore was nominated twice for a Critic's Choice Award, a Saturn Award, and won a People's Choice Award in 2017.

== Comic books ==
Norman appears in the 1992 three-issue comic book adaptation of the 1960 film Psycho released by Innovation Publishing. While the miniseries is a faithful colorized adaptation of the Hitchcock film, its version of Norman does not resemble Anthony Perkins. Artist Felipe Echevarria said that halfway through the project, the publishers realized that the actor had not granted the right to replicate his likeness; Echevarria had to redraw Norman's face in all panels, which resulted in publishing delays.

== Appearances ==
=== Novels ===
- Psycho (1959), by Robert Bloch
- Psycho II (1982), by Robert Bloch
- Psycho House (1990, as an animatronic), by Robert Bloch
- Suspects (1985), by David Thomson
- Danganronpa Kirigiri 2 (2013, as an animatronic, painting), by Takekuni Kitayama
- Psycho: Sanitarium (2016), by Chet Williamson

=== Films ===
- Psycho (1960)
- Psycho II (1983)
- Psycho III (1986)
- Bates Motel (1987)
- Psycho IV: The Beginning (1990)
- Psycho (1998)

=== Television ===
- Bates Motel (2013–2017)

=== Comics ===
- Alfred Hitchcock's Psycho (1992)

=== Music ===
- Norman Bates, by John L. Walters, a single and album track by Landscape (band) (1981)
- Bates Motel, a single by The Hitmen (1981)
- A Shower with Norman Bates, a single and album track by French band Etienne et Moi for their album Norman Bates (2006)
- The Shower Scene, an album track by Ice Nine Kills for their album The Silver Scream 2: Welcome to Horrorwood (2021)

== Reception ==
Norman Bates is ranked as the second-greatest villain on the American Film Institute's list of the top 100 film heroes and villains, behind Hannibal Lecter and ahead of Darth Vader. His line "A boy's best friend is his mother" also ranks as number 56 on the institute's list of the 100 greatest movie quotes. In 2008, Norman Bates was selected by Empire as one of The 100 Greatest Movie Characters. In 2009, Total Film issued its "The 150 Greatest Performances of All Time" list, ranking Perkins' performance in Psycho at 27th place. Bates also ranked number 4 on Premiere magazine's list of The 100 Greatest Movie Characters of All Time.
