= 25th Saturn Awards =

US film and television award ceremony

- Date: June 9, 1999
- Site: California, U.S.

Highlights
- Most awards: Vampires (3)
- Most nominations: Armageddon (7)

The 25th Saturn Awards, honoring the best in science fiction, fantasy and horror film and television in 1998, were held on June 9, 1999.

Below is a complete list of nominees and winners. Winners are highlighted in bold.

== Winners and nominees ==
=== Film ===
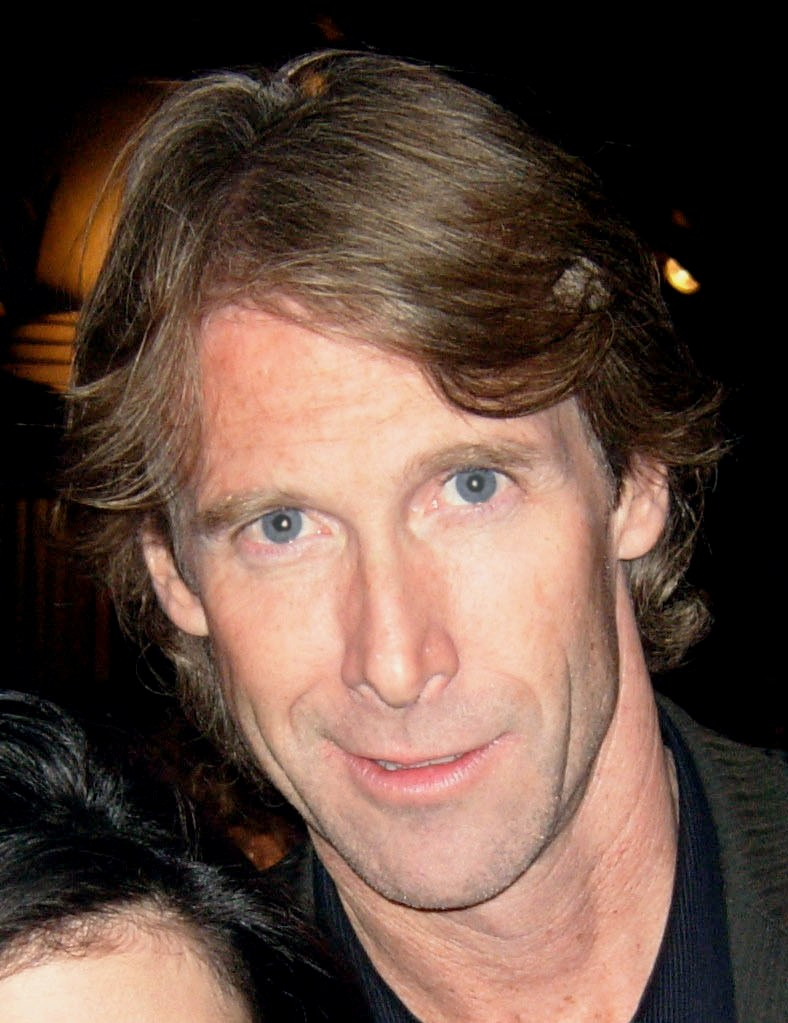
Michael Bay, Best Director winner

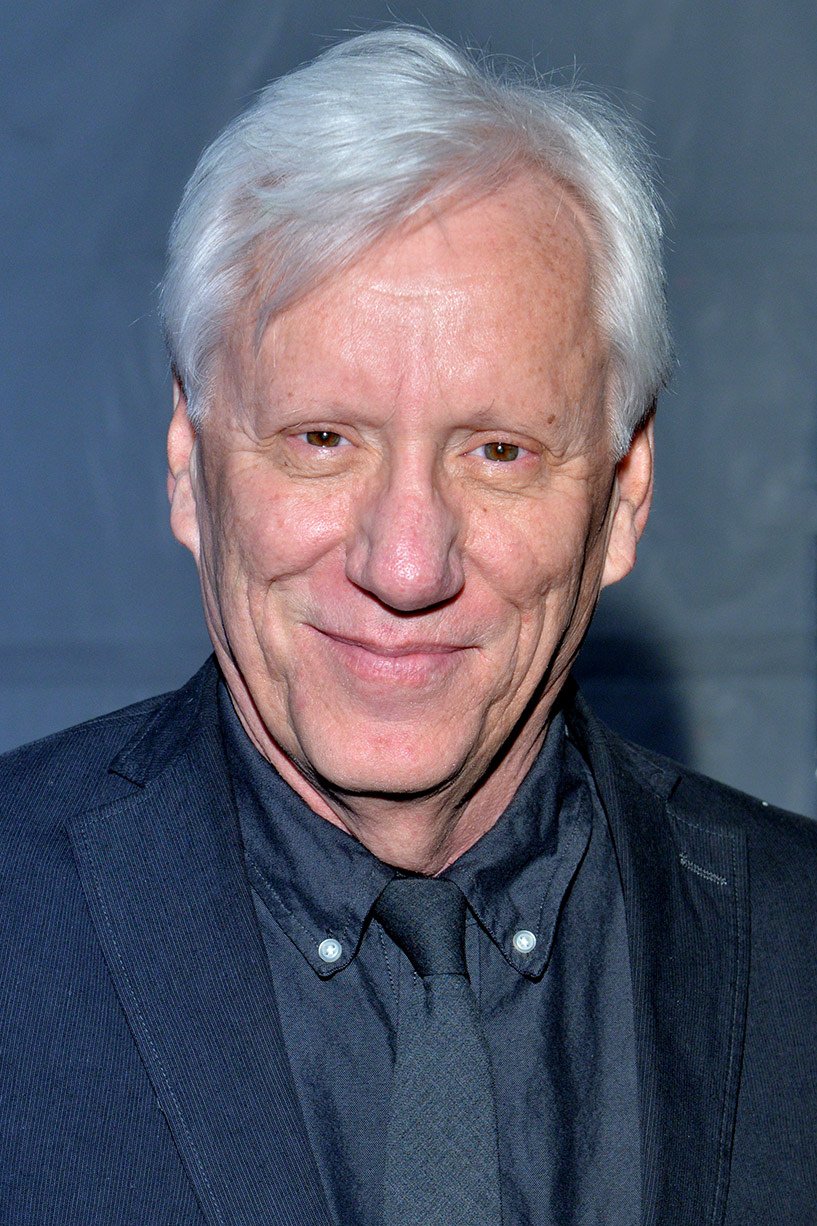
James Woods, Best Actor winner

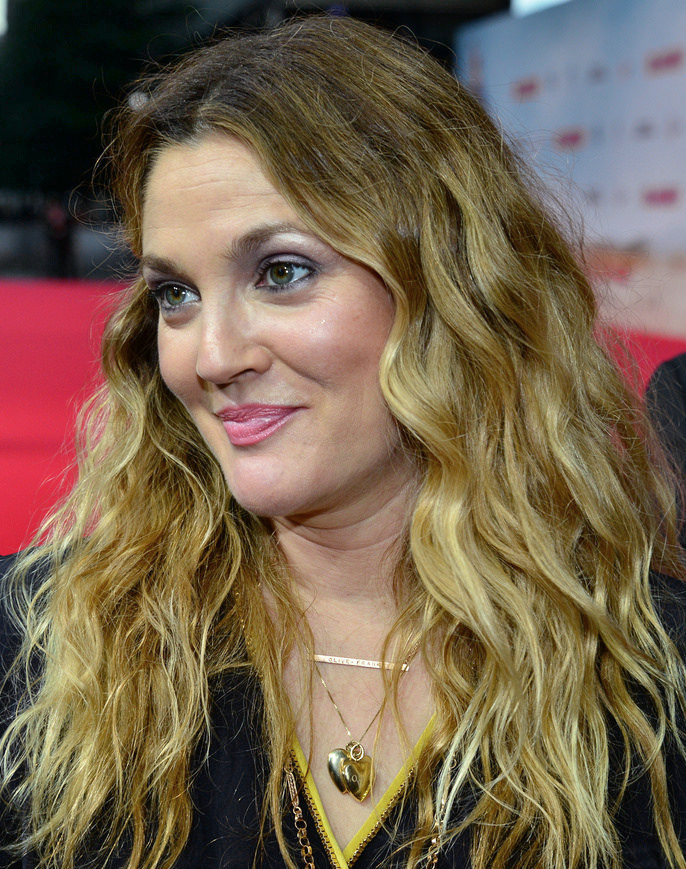
Drew Barrymore, Best Actress winner

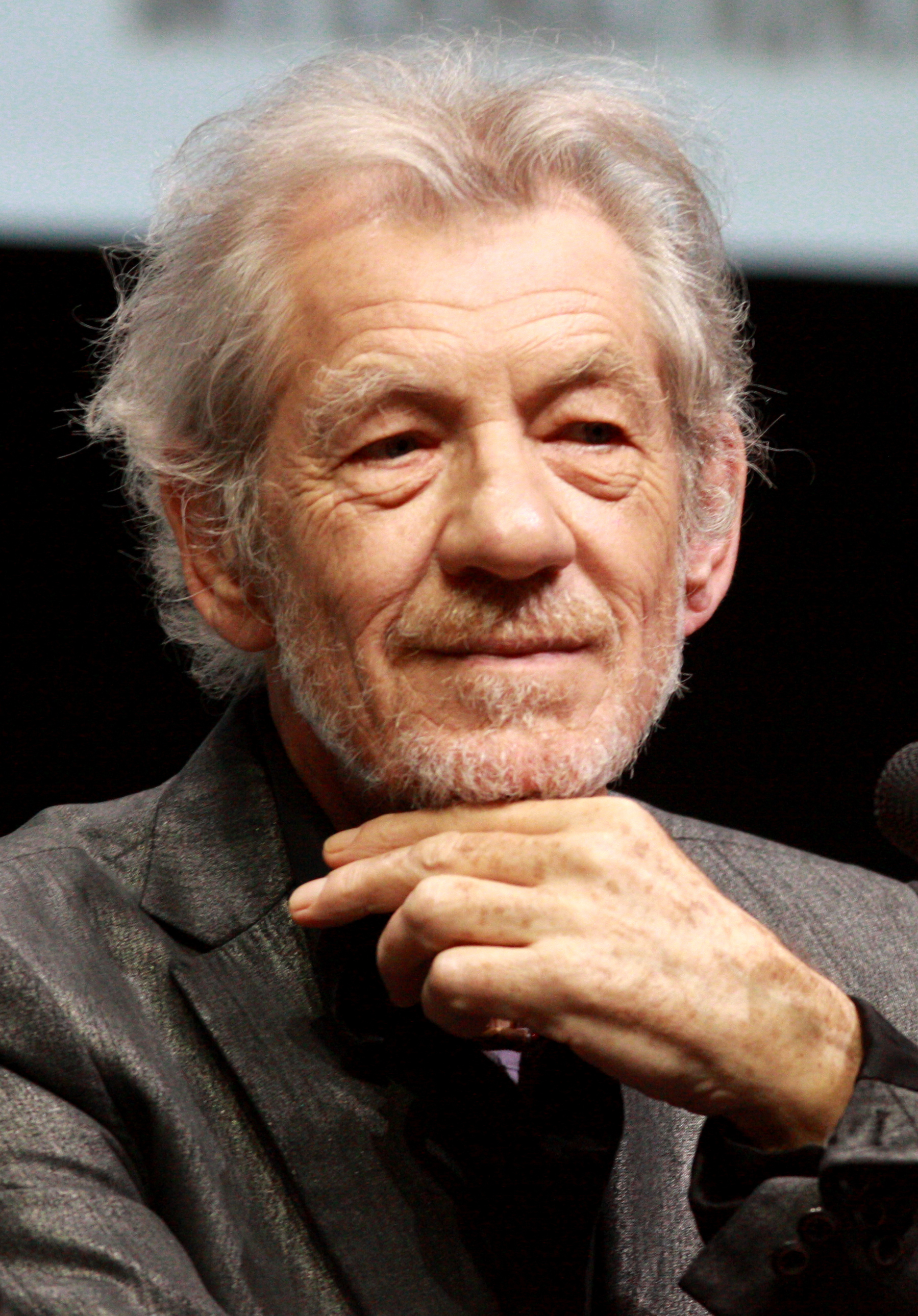
Ian McKellen, Best Supporting Actor winner

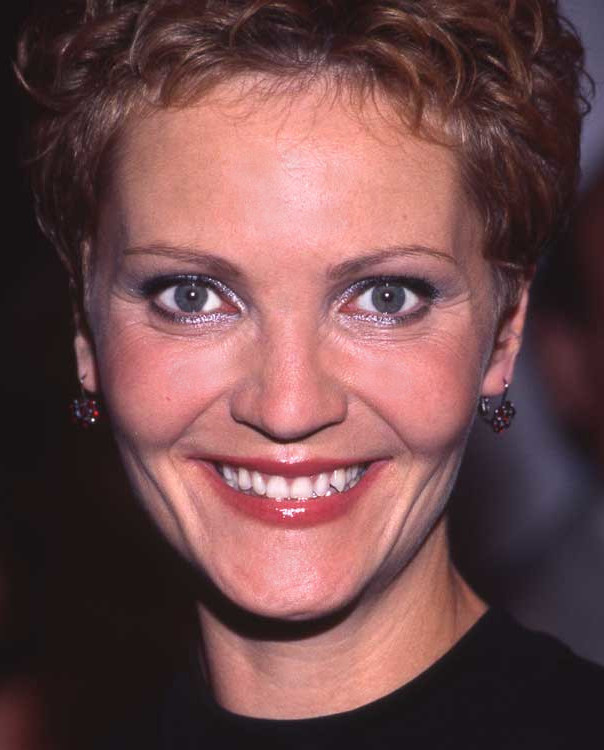
Joan Allen, Best Supporting Actress winner

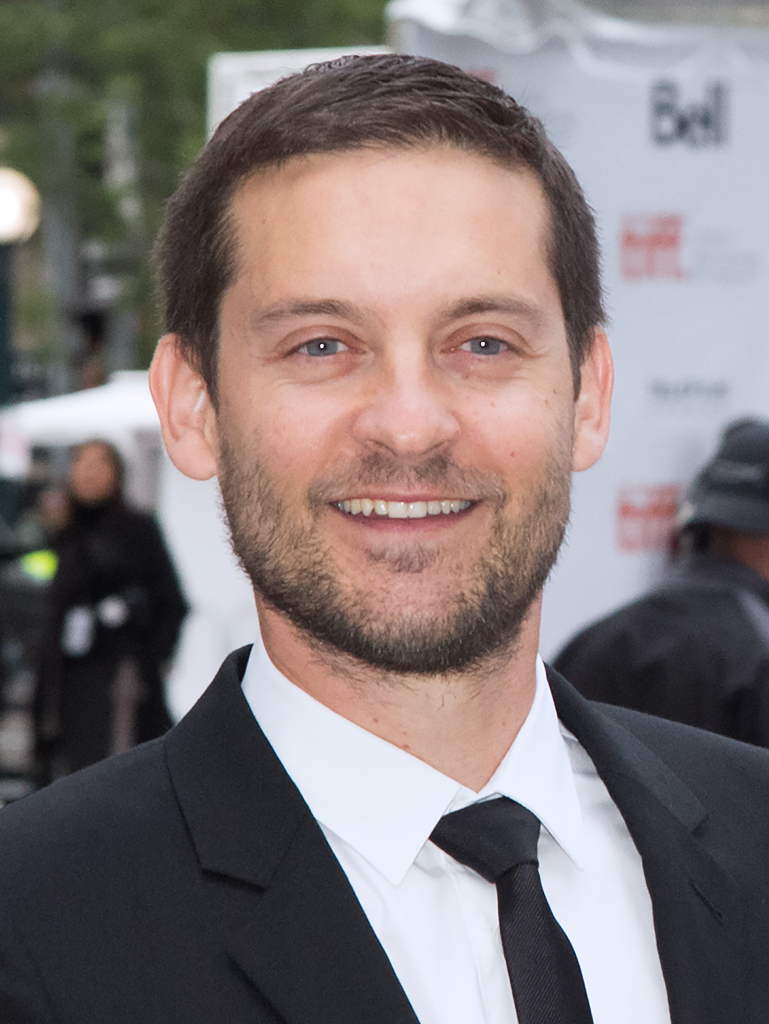
Tobey Maguire, Best Performance by a Younger Actor/Actress winner

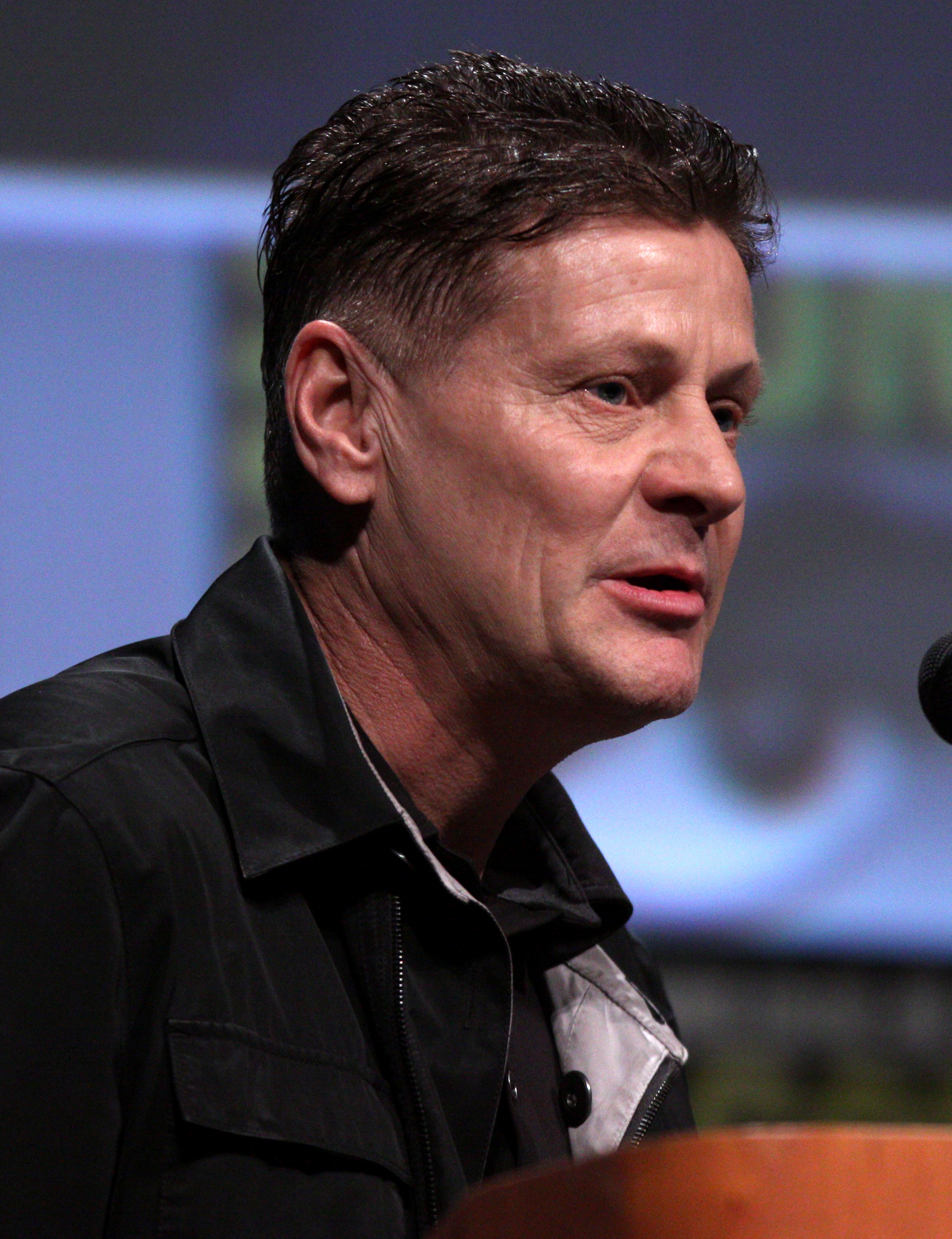
Andrew Niccol, Best Writing winner

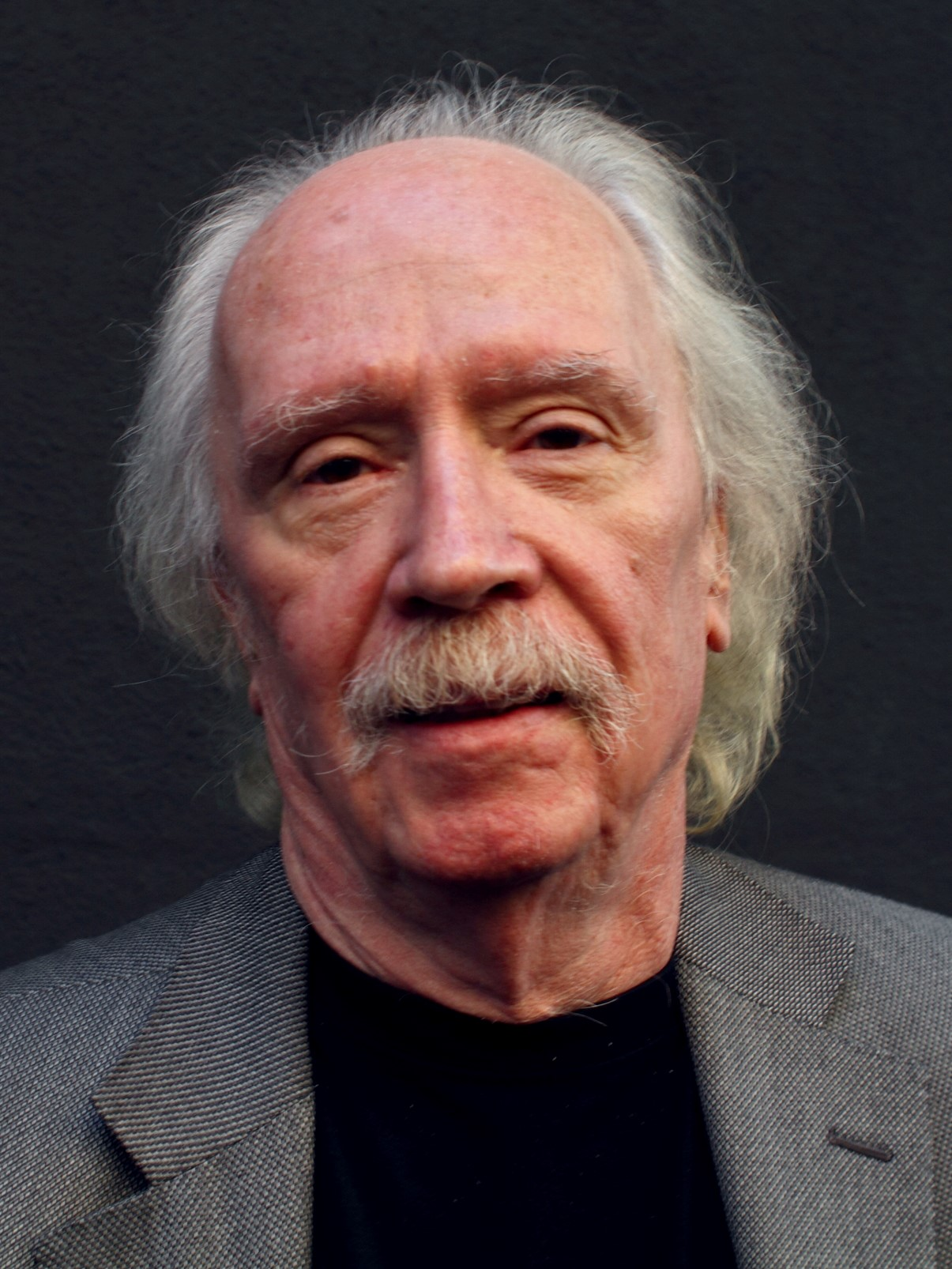
John Carpenter, Best Music winner

Best Actor	Best Actress
**James Woods – Vampires as John "Jack" Crow**; Jim Carrey – The Truman Show as Truman Burbank; David Duchovny – The X-Files as Special Agent Fox Mulder; Anthony Hopkins – Meet Joe Black as Bill Parrish; Edward Norton – American History X as Derek Vinyard; Bruce Willis – Armageddon as Harry S. Stamper	**Drew Barrymore – Ever After as Danielle de Barbarac**; Gillian Anderson – The X-Files as Special Agent Dana Scully; Jamie Lee Curtis – Halloween H20: 20 Years Later as Laurie Strode; Meg Ryan – City of Angels as Dr. Maggie Rice; Jennifer Tilly – Bride of Chucky as Tiffany Valentine; Catherine Zeta-Jones – The Mask of Zorro as Elena Montero
Best Supporting Actor	Best Supporting Actress
**Ian McKellen – Apt Pupil as Kurt Dussander / Arthur Denker**; Ben Affleck – Armageddon as A.J. Frost; Dennis Franz – City of Angels as Nathaniel Messinger; Ed Harris – The Truman Show as Christof; Gary Oldman – Lost in Space as Dr. Smith / Spider Smith; Billy Bob Thornton – A Simple Plan as Jacob Mitchell	**Joan Allen – Pleasantville as Betty Parker**; Claire Forlani – Meet Joe Black as Susan Parrish; Anne Heche – Psycho as Marion Crane; Anjelica Huston – Ever After as Baroness Rodmilla de Ghent; Sheryl Lee – Vampires as Katrina; Charlize Theron – Mighty Joe Young as Jill Young
Best Performance by a Younger Actor/Actress	Best Director
**Tobey Maguire – Pleasantville as David**; Josh Hartnett – The Faculty as Zeke Tyler; Katie Holmes – Disturbing Behavior as Rachel Wagner; Jack Johnson – Lost in Space as Will Robinson; Brad Renfro – Apt Pupil as Tod Bowden; Alicia Witt – Urban Legend as Natalie SImon	**Michael Bay – Armageddon**; Rob Bowman – The X-Files; Roland Emmerich – Godzilla; Alex Proyas – Dark City; Bryan Singer – Apt Pupil; Peter Weir – The Truman Show
Best Writing	Best Costumes
**Andrew Niccol – The Truman Show**; Brandon Boyce – Apt Pupil; Don Mancini – Bride of Chucky; Alex Proyas – Dark City; Gary Ross – Pleasantville; Joseph Stefano – Psycho	**Ever After – Jenny Beavan**; Armageddon – Michael Kaplan and Magali Guidasci; Dark City – Liz Keogh; Lost in Space – Vin Burnham, Robert Bell, and Gilly Hebden; The Mask of Zorro – Graciela Mazón; Pleasantville – Judianna Makovsky
Best Make-up	Best Music
**Vampires – Robert Kurtzman, Greg Nicotero, and Howard Berger**; Blade – Greg Cannom and Michael Germain; Dark City – Bob McCarron, Lesley Vanderwalt, and Lynn Wheeler; Lost in Space – Peter Robb-King; Star Trek: Insurrection – Michael Westmore; The X-Files – Alec Gillis, Tom Woodruff Jr., Michael Mills, and Greg Nelson	**John Carpenter – Vampires**; George S. Clinton – Wild Things; George Fenton – Ever After; Thomas Newman – Meet Joe Black; Trevor Rabin – Armageddon; Hans Zimmer – The Prince of Egypt
Best Special Effects	Best Science Fiction Film
**Godzilla – Volker Engel, Patrick Tatopoulos, Karen E. Goulekas, and Clay Pinney**; Armageddon – Patrick McClung, Richard R. Hoover, and John Frazier; Dark City – Andrew Mason, Mara Bryan, Peter Doyle, and Tom Davies; Lost in Space – Angus Bickerton; Mighty Joe Young – Rick Baker, Hoyt Yeatman, Allen Hall, and Jim Mitchell; Saving Private Ryan – Roger Guyett, Stefen Fangmeier, and Neil Corbould	**Armageddon (TIE)**; **Dark City (TIE)**; Deep Impact; Lost in Space; Star Trek: Insurrection; The X-Files
Best Action/Adventure/Thriller Film	Best Fantasy Film
**Saving Private Ryan**; The Mask of Zorro; The Negotiator; The Prince of Egypt; Ronin; A Simple Plan	**The Truman Show**; Babe: Pig in the City; A Bug's Life; City of Angels; Godzilla; Pleasantville
Best Horror Film	Best Home Video Release
**Apt Pupil**; Blade; Bride of Chucky; The Faculty; Halloween H20: 20 Years Later; Vampires	**From Dusk Till Dawn 2: Texas Blood Money**; Cube; Gattaca; Legionnaire; The Night Flier; The Ugly

=== Television ===
==== Programs ====
Best Genre Network Series	Best Genre Cable/Syndicated Series
**The X-Files (Fox)**; Buffy the Vampire Slayer (The WB); Charmed (The WB); Seven Days (UPN); The Simpsons (Fox); Star Trek: Voyager (UPN)	**Babylon 5 (TNT)**; The Outer Limits (Showtime); Psi Factor: Chronicles of the Paranormal (Syndicated); Sliders (Sci Fi); Star Trek: Deep Space Nine (Syndicated); Stargate SG-1 (Showtime)

==== Acting ====
Best Genre TV Actor	Best Genre TV Actress
**Richard Dean Anderson – Stargate SG-1 (Showtime) as Jack O'Neill**; Bruce Boxleitner – Babylon 5 (TNT) as John Sheridan; Nicholas Brendon – Buffy the Vampire Slayer (The WB) as Xander Harris; David Duchovny – The X-Files (Fox) as Fox Mulder; Lance Henriksen – Millennium (Fox) as Frank Black; Jonathan LaPaglia – Seven Days (UPN) as Frank Parker	**Sarah Michelle Gellar – Buffy the Vampire Slayer (The WB) as Buffy Summers**; Gillian Anderson – The X-Files (Fox) as Dana Scully; Claudia Christian – Babylon 5 (TNT) as Susan Ivanova; Shannen Doherty – Charmed (The WB) as Prue Halliwell; Kate Mulgrew – Star Trek: Voyager (UPN) as Kathryn Janeway; Jeri Ryan – Star Trek: Voyager (UPN) as Seven of Nine

=== Special awards ===
George Pal Memorial Award

- Ray Bradbury

Life Career Award

- James Coburn
- Nathan Juran

President's Award

- William Friedkin

Service Award

- David Shepard
