= Marion Crane =

Fictional character from the 1959 novel Psycho; portrayed by Janet Leigh in the 1960 film

- Psycho character
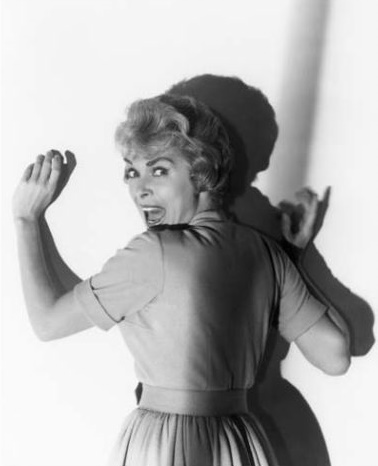
- Janet Leigh as Marion Crane in a promotional still for Psycho (1960)
- First appearance: Psycho (1959)
- Created by: Robert Bloch
- Portrayed by: Janet Leigh; Anne Heche; Rihanna

In-universe information
- Gender: Female
- Family: Lila Crane (sister); Mary Loomis (deceased niece; film canon only)
- Significant other: Sam Loomis (deceased boyfriend/brother-in-law)

Marion Crane (originally known as Mary Crane, also by the alias Marie Samuels) is a fictional character of Robert Bloch's 1959 thriller novel Psycho and portrayed by Janet Leigh in Alfred Hitchcock's 1960 film adaptation. She was later played by Anne Heche in the 1998 remake and Rihanna in the television series Bates Motel (2017).

Marion was conceived by Bloch as a false protagonist, and is the sister of Psycho's true protagonist Lila Crane. Leigh's portrayal of the character is the best known, establishing the actress as one of the first scream queens and the character as culturally significant; Leigh also won a Golden Globe and was nominated for an Academy Award. Heche's portrayal was ambivalently received by critics.

== Biography ==
=== Novel and 1960 film ===
In the film Marion lives in Phoenix, Arizona as a secretary and is unhappy in her relationship with Sam Loomis (John Gavin), a divorcée who is in too much debt to marry her. Marion rejects his idea to take the afternoon off and rushes back to her storefront real estate office. Her boss of ten years, George Lowery (Vaughn Taylor), arrives shortly afterward with Tom Cassidy (Frank Albertson), a wealthy customer who is buying the Harris Street Property, one of Lowery's houses on the market for $40,000 as a wedding present for his daughter, making cash payment in full, which causes mild alarm to Lowery. However, instead of depositing Cassidy's money in the bank, Marion, wanting to pay Sam's debts in order to marry him, impulsively goes on the run with the money. She drives to the (fictional) small town of Fairvale, California, where Sam lives, and pays California Charlie (John Anderson), a used car salesman, to trade her car for a new one after a highway patrol officer (Mort Mills) checks her license plate. She turns off the main road without realizing it, and arrives at the Bates Motel. She checks in with the proprietor, Norman Bates (Anthony Perkins), who shyly invites her to have dinner with him. After wrapping the remaining money inside a newspaper, Marion overhears a heated argument between Norman and his mother about letting Marion into the house.

During dinner, Marion has a conversation with Norman, who says that he is trapped by his obligation to his mentally ill mother. She realizes that she, too, is stuck in a "private trap", and can only escape it by taking responsibility for stealing the money. She gently suggests to Norman that he put his mother in a mental hospital, which he heatedly refuses to do. She bids him goodnight, and returns to her room. There, she undresses while Norman watches through a peephole hidden in the wall of his office. Resolving to make amends to her employer, Marion makes a few calculations based on how much the escapade has cost her. She then takes a shower. Suddenly, a mysterious figure enters the bathroom — its shadow visible through the shower curtain — and stabs Marion to death. (In the novel Psycho, she is beheaded by the knife.) Believing his mother has committed the murder, Norman puts the naked corpse and shower curtain—and, unknowingly, the money—in the trunk of Marion's car and sinks it in a nearby swamp.

The climax of the novel and film reveals that Norman murdered Marion while under the control of an alternate personality—one taking the form of his mother, whom he had murdered ten years before. The psychiatrist who examines Norman explains that, when Norman felt attracted to Marion, the "Mother" personality became jealous and killed her. In the final scene, Norman—now completely controlled by the "Mother" personality—is institutionalized for killing Marion.

In the novel, she is named Mary Crane, originates from Dallas, Texas, and dies after Norman decapitates her; in the film, "Mother" stabs her repeatedly. Her name was changed to Marion in the film because of a real life Mary Crane residing in Phoenix, Arizona at the time the film was made.

=== Later appearances and references ===
Psycho's first sequel, 1983's Psycho II, starts off with a flashback to the shower scene. Marion's sister, Lila Crane (Vera Miles), now Lila Loomis, is on a crusade to keep Norman locked up. The film introduces Mary Loomis (Meg Tilly), Lila's daughter with Sam and Marion's niece. Both are killed in the film; Lila is stabbed by a woman who looks like him in his "Mother" guise (later revealed to be Emma Spool, portrayed by Claudia Bryar), and Mary is shot by police when she attempts to kill Norman.

In the second sequel, 1986's Psycho III, the shower scene appears again in a flashback, this time when Norman sees Maureen Coyle (Diana Scarwid) who reminds him of Marion. "Mother" tries to kill Maureen in exactly the same room and bathroom of the Bates Motel where Marion died, only to find that Maureen slit her wrists in a bathtub filled with water in an attempted suicide. Later, after being rescued by Norman, "Mother" kills Maureen by pushing her down the same stairs of the Bates house where private investigator Milton Arbogast died.

Marion makes no appearance in the final sequel, 1990's Psycho IV: The Beginning. She is merely referred to a few times as "the girl [Norman] killed in the shower".

=== Comic book ===
Marion appears in the 1992 three-issue comic book adaptation of the 1960 film Psycho, released by Innovation Publishing.

=== Bates Motel series ===
In the TV series Bates Motel, a contemporary prequel to the 1960 film Psycho, Marion is a notary public living in Seattle, Washington. She is in a long-distance relationship with Sam Loomis, who, unbeknownst to her, is married. She meets him at the Bates Motel for a tryst, and the proprietor, Norman Bates, spies on them through a peephole as they make love. Sam tells Marion he is in too much debt to marry her. Marion rushes to her real estate office and asks her boss George Lowery for a promotion and a pay raise, but he refuses. She drives to Sam's hometown of White Pine Bay, Oregon and tells him to meet her at the motel. She meets Norman, who tells her that Sam is using her, and gives her his address. When she arrives at Sam's house, she sees him arguing with his wife and realizes Norman is right, and that Sam has played her for a fool; enraged, she takes a lug wrench to his car and smashes it. She returns to the motel and seeks comfort from Norman, who fears that his "Mother" personality will take control and kill her. To save her, he urges her to leave and never come back. She drives away with the money to begin a new life, while Norman kills Sam, who came to the motel to find her; in a nod to the original film, Norman stabs Sam to death in the shower.

== Reception ==
Marion was played by Janet Leigh in the 1960 film Psycho and by Anne Heche in the 1998 remake. Leigh was nominated for an Academy Award for Best Supporting Actress and won the Golden Globe Award for Best Supporting Actress. Heche was nominated for a Golden Raspberry Award for Worst Actress.

Rihanna portrayed Marion in the fifth and final season of the TV series Bates Motel, a contemporary prequel to the 1960 film Psycho. This version of the character is a contemporary take on the role.

== Appearances ==
=== Novels ===
- Psycho (1959, as "Mary Crane")
- Psycho II (1982, mentioned only)

=== Films ===
- Psycho (1960)
- Psycho II (1983, flashback only)
- Psycho III (1986, flashback only)
- Psycho IV: The Beginning (1990, mentioned only)
- Psycho (1998)

=== Television ===
- Bates Motel (2017, three episodes)

=== Comics ===
- Alfred Hitchcock's Psycho (1992)
