= Psycho (novel) =

1959 novel by Robert Bloch

- First edition cover
- Author: Robert Bloch
- Cover artist: Tony Palladino
- Language: English
- Genre: Horror; Thriller
- Publisher: Simon & Schuster
- Publication date: April 10, 1959
- Publication place: United States
- Media type: Print (hardback & paperback)
- Pages: 185 (first edition)
- Followed by: Psycho II

Psycho is a 1959 horror novel by American writer Robert Bloch, originally published by Simon & Schuster under its Inner Sanctum Mystery imprint.

The novel tells the story of Norman Bates, a caretaker at an isolated motel who struggles under his domineering mother and becomes embroiled in a series of murders. The novel is considered Bloch's most enduring work and one of the most influential horror novels of the 20th century.

The story was adapted into Alfred Hitchcock's 1960 film of the same name, and adapted into the television series Bates Motel (2013–2017). Bloch later wrote two sequels, which are unrelated to any of the film sequels.

== Plot ==
Norman Bates, a middle-aged bachelor, is dominated by his mother, an old woman who forbids him to have a life outside of her. They run a small motel in the town of Fairvale, but business has suffered since the state relocated the highway.

Meanwhile, Mary Crane, a young single woman, is on the run after stealing $40,000 from a client of the Texas real estate company where she works. She stole the money so her boyfriend, Sam Loomis, could pay off his debts and they could get married. Mary arrives at the Bates Motel after accidentally turning off the main highway. After checking in, she accepts Bates's invitation to have dinner with him at his house, an invitation that sends Mrs. Bates into a jealous rage.

During dinner, Mary suggests that Bates put his mother in a mental institution, but he denies that there is anything wrong with her. Mary says goodnight and returns to her room, resolving to return the money so she will not end up like Bates. However, a figure resembling an old woman later beheads Mary in the shower with a butcher knife.

Bates, who had passed out drunk after dinner, returns to the motel and finds Mary's corpse. Convinced that his mother killed her, Norman considers letting her go to prison, but changes his mind after having a nightmare in which she sinks in quicksand, only to turn into him as she goes under. His mother comes to comfort him, and he decides to dispose of Mary's body, belongings, and car in the swamp.

Meanwhile, Mary's sister, Lila, tells Sam of her sister's disappearance. They are soon joined by Milton Arbogast, a private investigator hired by Mary's boss to retrieve the money. Arbogast eventually meets Bates, who says that Mary left after one night; when he asks to talk with his mother, Bates refuses. This arouses Arbogast's suspicion, and he calls Lila to say that he is going to try to talk to Mrs. Bates. When he enters the house, Mary's killer ambushes him in the foyer, and murders him with a razor.

Sam and Lila go to Fairvale to look for Arbogast, and meet with the town sheriff, who reveals that Mrs. Bates has been dead for years, having committed suicide by poisoning her lover and herself. The young Norman had a nervous breakdown after finding them and was sent for a time to a mental institution. Sam and Lila go to the motel to investigate. Sam distracts Bates while Lila is meant to get the sheriff, but she proceeds up to the house to investigate on her own. She finds books on occultism, abnormal psychology, metaphysics, and Marquis de Sade in his bedroom. During a conversation with Sam, Bates says that his mother had only pretended to be dead and had communicated with him while he was in the institution. Bates then says that Lila tricked him and went up to the house, and that his mother was waiting for her. Bates knocks Sam unconscious with a liquor bottle that he has been drinking from. At the house, Lila discovers Mrs. Bates' mummified corpse on the floor in the fruit cellar. As she screams, a figure rushes into the room with a knife—Norman Bates, dressed in his mother's clothes. Meanwhile, Sam, who had regained consciousness, enters the room, and subdues Norman before he can harm Lila.

Later, with Bates arrested, the county highway crew starts dredging the swamp to uncover the automobiles, revealing the bodies of Mary and Arbogast; a media frenzy imagines additional victims to be uncovered if the swamp is further drained. It is revealed that Bates and his mother lived together in a state of total codependence ever since his father deserted them when he was still a young child. Along the way, introverted, awkward, and filled with rage, Norman became a secret cross-dresser, impersonating his mother. A bookworm, he became fascinated with the occult, spiritualism, and Satanism. When his mother took a lover named Joe Considine, Bates went over the edge with jealousy and poisoned them both with strychnine, forging a suicide note in his mother's handwriting. To suppress the guilt of matricide, he developed an alternate personality—his mother, who is as cruel and possessive as the real Mrs. Bates had been. He retrieved her corpse from the cemetery and preserved it, and whenever the illusion was threatened, he would get drunk, dress in her clothes, and speak to himself in her voice. The "Mother" personality killed Mary because "she" was jealous of Norman's feeling of affection for another woman.

Bates is declared psychotic and put in a mental institution for life. Days later, the "Mother" personality completely takes over Bates's mind. "She" blames Norman for the murders, and is resolved to stay quiet and still to show Norman's doctors at the institution that she "wouldn't even harm a fly."

== Allusions ==
In November 1957, two years before Psycho was first published, Ed Gein was arrested in his hometown of Plainfield, Wisconsin for the murders of two women. When police searched his home, they found furniture, silverware, and even clothing made of human skin and body parts. Psychiatrists examining him theorized that he was trying to make a "woman suit" to wear so he could pretend to be his dead mother, whom neighbors described as a puritan who dominated her son.

At the time of Gein's arrest, Bloch was living 35 miles (56 km) away from Plainfield in Weyauwega. Though Bloch was not aware of the Gein case at that time, he began writing with "the notion that the man next door may be a monster unsuspected even in the gossip-ridden microcosm of small-town life". The novel, one of several Bloch wrote about insane killers, was almost completed when Gein and his activities were revealed, so Bloch inserted a line alluding to Gein into one of the final chapters. Bloch was surprised years later when news of Gein's living in isolation with a religiously fanatical mother came to his attention. Bloch "discovered how closely the imaginary character I'd created resembled the real Ed Gein both in overt act and apparent motivation".

== Sequels ==
Bloch wrote two sequels, Psycho II (1982) and Psycho House (1990); neither was related to the film sequels.

In the novel Psycho II, Bates escapes the asylum disguised as a nun and makes his way to Hollywood. Universal Pictures allegedly did not want to film it because of its social commentary on splatter films.

In the novel Psycho House, murders begin again when the Bates Motel is reopened as a tourist attraction.

A fourth installment, titled Robert Bloch's Psycho: Sanitarium written by Chet Williamson, was released in 2016. The book is set between the events of the original novel and Psycho II, recounting the events which took place in a state hospital for the criminally insane where Bates is a patient.

== Adaptations ==
=== Film ===
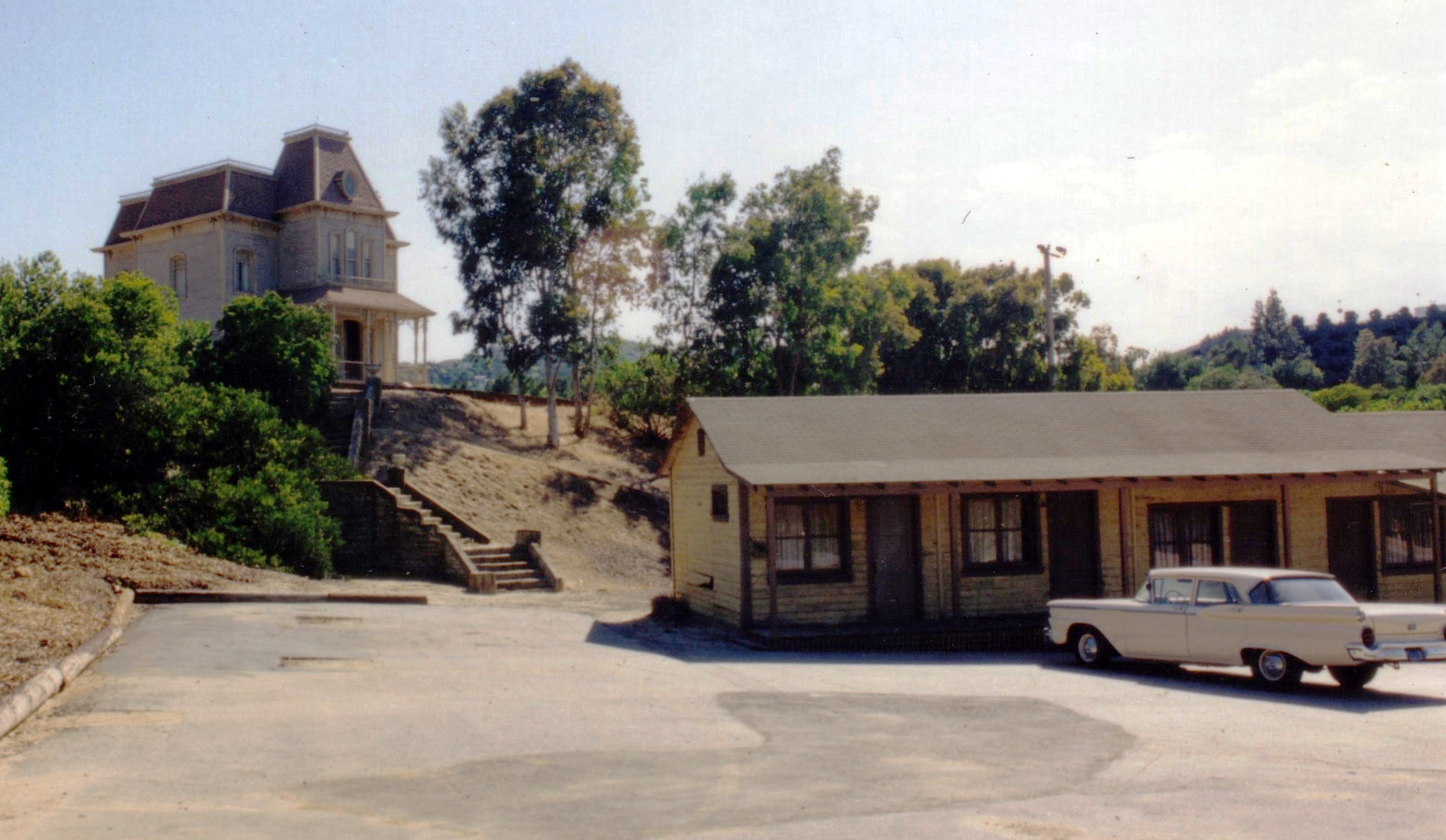
Bates Motel set at Universal Studios, Hollywood, California

Bloch's novel was adapted in 1960 into the feature film by director Alfred Hitchcock. It was written by Joseph Stefano and starred Anthony Perkins as Bates and Janet Leigh in an Academy Award-nominated performance as Marion Crane (changed from "Mary" for the film, as there was a Mary Crane in Phoenix at that time). Hitchcock helped devise a promotional and marketing scheme for his film that insisted that critics would not get advance screenings, and that no one would be admitted into the theater after the film had begun. The promotional scheme also exhorted audiences not to reveal the twist ending.

Twenty-three years after the release of Hitchcock's film and three years after the director's death came the first of three sequels, all featuring Perkins. After Psycho III, there was also a made-for-television movie named Bates Motel, intended as a backdoor pilot for a television series that wasn't picked up, in which Bates briefly appears played by another actor. It is not in continuity with the final sequel Psycho IV: The Beginning.

Gus Van Sant directed a 1998 remake of the original film in which virtually every camera angle and line of dialogue was duplicated from the original. It starred Vince Vaughn as Bates and Anne Heche as Marion Crane. It was reviled by critics and performed poorly at the box office.

=== Television series ===
A "contemporary prequel" television series, Bates Motel, was developed by Carlton Cuse, Kerry Ehrin and Anthony Cipriano. Starring Vera Farmiga as Norma Bates and Freddie Highmore as Norman Bates, the series ran from 2013 to 2018.
