= Psycho (1998 film) =

Film by Gus Van Sant

- Theatrical release poster
- Directed by: Gus Van Sant
- Screenplay by: Joseph Stefano
- Based on: Psycho; 1959 novel by Robert Bloch
- Produced by: Gus Van Sant; Brian Grazer
- Starring: Vince Vaughn; Julianne Moore; Viggo Mortensen; William H. Macy; Anne Heche
- Cinematography: Christopher Doyle
- Edited by: Amy E. Duddleston
- Music by: Bernard Herrmann (Note: The film features Herrmann's original score as rearranged by Danny Elfman and Steve Bartek.)
- Production company: Imagine Entertainment
- Distributed by: Universal Pictures
- Release date: December 4, 1998
- Running time: 104 minutes
- Country: United States
- Language: English
- Budget: $25 million
- Box office: $37.2 million

Psycho is a 1998 American horror film co-produced and directed by Gus Van Sant, and starring Vince Vaughn, Julianne Moore, Viggo Mortensen, William H. Macy, and Anne Heche. It is a modern remake of Alfred Hitchcock's 1960 film of the same name, in which Marion Crane, an embezzler, arrives at an old motel run by a mysterious man named Norman Bates; both films are adapted from Robert Bloch's 1959 novel.

Though filmed in color and set in 1998, the film is closer to a shot-for-shot retelling than most remakes, often copying Hitchcock's camera movements and editing, including the original script by Joseph Stefano (and uncredited writer Alma Reville) mostly being carried over. Bernard Herrmann's musical score is reused as well, though with a new arrangement by Danny Elfman and Steve Bartek, recorded in stereo. Some changes are introduced to account for advances in technology since the original film and to make the content more explicit. The film's murder sequences are also intercut with surreal images. Van Sant later stated that the film was an experiment to demonstrate that "You can't copy a film... you can appropriate, but it's not going to be the same thing".

Released by Universal Pictures on December 4, 1998, Psycho received polarizing reviews from critics, as well as being panned by audiences, who criticized the similarities to the original film. The film won the Golden Raspberry Awards for Worst Remake and Worst Director, and was nominated for Worst Actress (Heche) at the 19th Golden Raspberry Awards, but conversely earned two Saturn Award nominations for Best Supporting Actress (Heche) and Best Writing (Stefano) at the 25th Saturn Awards.

== Plot ==
During a Friday afternoon tryst in a Phoenix hotel, real-estate secretary Marion Crane and her boyfriend Sam Loomis discuss their inability to get married because of his debts. Returning to work, she decides to steal a cash payment of $400,000 entrusted to her for deposit at the bank and drive to Sam's home in Fairvale, California. En route, she hurriedly trades her car, arousing suspicion.

Running into bad weather, Marion stops for the night at the Bates Motel and uses an alias. Proprietor Norman Bates invites her to dine with him. After he returns to his house atop a hill overlooking the hotel, Marion overhears him arguing with his mother Norma about her presence. Norman returns and apologizes for his mother's outbursts. He discusses his taxidermy hobby, his mother's "illness" and how people have their own "private trap" that they wish to escape from. Marion, remorseful of her crime, decides to return the stolen money, unaware that the aroused Norman is watching her through a hole in the wall. As she showers, a shadowy figure brutally stabs her to death. Horrified upon finding Marion's corpse, Norman places her body and the hidden cash in her car, and sinks the car in a swamp nearby.

Marion's sister Lila arrives a week later and tells Sam about the theft. Private investigator Milton Arbogast says that he has been hired to retrieve the money. He questions Norman and finds him suspicious; when he asks to speak to Norman's mother, Norman refuses. Arbogast enters the Bates home, where a figure resembling an elderly woman fatally stabs him.

Hearing no word from Arbogast, Sam and Lila grow curious about the Bates Motel, Arbogast's last stop. Al Chambers, the local sheriff, tells them that Norman's mother died in a murder-suicide ten years earlier. Convinced that something happened to Arbogast, Lila and Sam check into the Bates Motel posing as a married couple, and infiltrate Marion's room, finding a missing shower curtain and a paper indicating that Marion subtracted an amount from her cash payment. Sam distracts Norman in the office, while Lila sneaks into his house. Norman becomes agitated and knocks Sam unconscious. Lila hides in the fruit cellar, where she discovers the mother's mummified body. She screams, and Norman, wearing his mother's clothes and a wig, tries to stab her. Sam subdues him, rescuing Lila.

At the police station, psychiatrist Dr. Simon Richmond explains that Norman jealously murdered Norma and her lover by poisoning them with strychnine ten years earlier. He mummified her corpse and began treating it as if she were still alive, going so far as to recreate her in his mind as an alternate personality, as jealous and possessive as she was while alive. When Norman is attracted to a woman, "Mother" takes over: he had murdered two other women before Marion, and Arbogast was killed to hide "his mother's" crime. "Mother" has now completely taken over Norman's personality. Sitting in a jail cell, Norman hears his mother saying that the murders were all his doing, as Marion's car is retrieved from the swamp.

== Cast ==
- Vince Vaughn as Norman Bates
- Anne Heche as Marion Crane
- Julianne Moore as Lila Crane
- Viggo Mortensen as Sam Loomis
- William H. Macy as Detective Milton Arbogast
- Robert Forster as Dr. Simon Richmond
- Philip Baker Hall as Sheriff Al Chambers
- Anne Haney as Eliza Chambers
- Rance Howard as George Lowery
- Chad Everett as Tom Cassidy
- Rita Wilson as Caroline
- James Remar as Highway Patrolman
- James LeGros as Charlie
- Mike "Flea" Balzary as Bob Summerfield
- Rose Marie as Norma Bates (voice, uncredited)

== Production ==
=== Development ===
Director Gus Van Sant was a longtime admirer of Alfred Hitchcock's Psycho (1960), and, while a film student, shot a parody commercial for a fictional "Psycho Shampoo" brand, which featured a recreation of the 1960 film's shower murder sequence. After the release of Van Sant's financially successful Good Will Hunting (1997), Universal Pictures agreed to option his proposed remake of the film. Van Sant's pitch was to remake the film shot-for-shot, which Casey Silver, then-head of production at Universal Pictures, felt was "a very strange idea. The idea of remaking a classic like Psycho just seemed like a dangerous business to get into". When asked why he wanted to remake the film in this manner, Van Sant responded: "Why not? It's a marketing scheme. Why does a studio ever remake a film? Because they have this little thing they've forgotten about that they could put in the marketplace and make money from".

=== Casting ===
Marion Crane was initially going be played by Nicole Kidman, but she was forced to leave the role due to scheduling problems. Drew Barrymore was also considered for the role before Anne Heche was ultimately cast. Julianne Moore, who was cast as Lila Crane, intentionally chose to portray the character as a more aggressive personality in contrast to Vera Miles's interpretation. William H. Macy chose to stay true to the portrayal of his character Milton Arbogast in the 1960 film, while Vince Vaughn, who played Norman Bates, and Moore interpreted the dialogue and scenes from the original film differently.

=== Filming ===
Shot from the "shower scene" in the original film (top) and the remake (bottom).

Filming of Psycho took place largely on the Universal Studios Hollywood backlot in Los Angeles, with additional exterior filming taking place in Phoenix, including at the Hotel Westward Ho from July 6, 1998, to August 26, 1998.

Van Sant began with the vision of remaking the film entirely shot-for-shot, stating that he and his crew started out being fanatical about doing it exactly the same, but early into the filming process, realized that doing so was unfeasible: "There were a couple of scenes we just couldn't get it right. We just couldn't see how Hitchcock did the blocking, where people were supposed to be standing in relation to the camera. So all we could do was loosely base them on the original".

Because the film was shot in color, fake blood was used during the film's famous shower murder scene, instead of chocolate syrup as had been done in the original film. Rick Baker designed the Mrs. Norma Bates dummy. The new film heightened the violence to the levels of depictions of violence in films made circa 1998 by portraying two knife wounds in her back and blood on the wall in the shower scene. It also shows the buttocks of the Marion character when she dies, an aspect cut from the original film.

The costume designer, Beatrix Aruna Pasztor, originally thought that the film was going to be a period piece, so she acquired period clothing for the cast, which was used in the film.

=== Divergences from the 1960 film ===
Though almost entirely a shot-for-shot remake of the original, the film does feature slight differences in terms of visuals, minor plot details, as well as the actors' portrayals of the characters. Van Sant updated several elements in the screenplay, including setting the film in contemporary 1998, and adjusting the references to money that would be anachronistic in a modern-day setting. Due to inflation, the amount of money stolen as stipulated in the original film was adjusted from $40,000 (equivalent to $181,000 in 1998) to $400,000.

Where the 1960 film features little visual bloodletting in its murder sequences, Van Sant's film features more explicit violence, particularly during Marion Crane's murder sequence in the shower: in Van Sant's film, blood is shown streaming down the shower wall tiles, as well as visible stab wounds to Crane's back as she collapses in the bathtub.

During the scene where Norman Bates spies on Marion through a peephole as she undresses, it is made explicit that Bates is masturbating through the use of sound effects as well as Vaughn's performance, which suggests Bates's voyeuristic encounter ends in him having an orgasm; in the 1960 film, the sequence consists merely of Bates observing, with no suggestion that he is masturbating.

Van Sant also employed several surreal subliminal images that were edited into the film's murder sequences, likened by horror writer Charles Derry as "surreal memory fragments" that "flash" before the characters' eyes as they die.

== Soundtrack ==
The film's soundtrack, Psycho: Music from and Inspired by the Motion Picture, included Danny Elfman's re-recordings of some of Bernard Herrmann's score for the original film, along with a collection of songs in genres from country to drum and bass, connected mainly by titles containing "psycho" or other death or insanity-related words. Many of the songs were recorded specifically for the soundtrack, and included a sampling of Herrmann's score composed by Elfman. The soundtrack also includes the track "Living Dead Girl" by Rob Zombie, which can be heard during the film when Marion trades in her old car for a new one.

== Release ==
=== Box office ===
Psycho was released theatrically in the United States on December 4, 1998, in 2,477 theaters, ranking at number two at the domestic box office below A Bug's Life with a weekend gross of $10,031,850. It went on to earn a total of $37,141,130 in the worldwide box office, $21,456,130 domestically. The film's production budget was an estimated $25 million; while promoting his 2002 film Gerry, Van Sant said he thought the producers "broke even" financially.

=== Critical reception ===
If there was ever a film crying out not to be made, this is that film. No need to have this remake.

— Roger Ebert, criticizing the film

On the review aggregator website Rotten Tomatoes, 40% of 77 critics' reviews are positive, with an average rating of 5.3/10. The website's consensus reads: "Van Sant's pointless remake neither improves nor illuminates Hitchcock's original." Metacritic, which uses a weighted average, assigned the film a score of 47 out of 100, based on 23 critics, indicating "mixed or average" reviews. Audiences polled by CinemaScore gave the film an average grade of "C−" on an A+ to F scale.

Literary critic Camille Paglia commented that the only reason to watch it was "to see Anne Heche being assassinated" and that "it should have been a much more important work and event than it was". At the 1998 Stinkers Bad Movie Awards, the film was cited as one of 37 dishonourable mentions for Worst Picture. Universal Pictures received the Founders Award "for even thinking the moviegoing public would line up and pay to see a shot-for-shot remake of Psycho".

Film critic Roger Ebert, who gave the film one-and-a-half stars, noted that the addition of a masturbation scene was "appropriate, because this new Psycho evokes the real thing in an attempt to re-create remembered passion". He thought Vaughn was miscast, unable to capture the "secret pool of madness" in the character of Norman Bates, and Heche was guilty of overacting. Ebert wrote that the film "is an invaluable experiment in the theory of cinema, because it demonstrates that a shot-by-shot remake is pointless; genius apparently resides between or beneath the shots, or in chemistry that cannot be timed or counted". Janet Maslin remarks that it is an "artful, good-looking remake (a modest term, but it beats plagiarism) that shrewdly revitalizes the aspects of the real Psycho (1960) that it follows most faithfully but seldom diverges seriously or successfully from one of the cinema's most brilliant blueprints"; she noted that the "absence of anything like Anthony Perkins's sensational performance with that vitally birdlike presence and sneaky way with a double-entendre ('A boy's best friend is his mother') is the new film's greatest weakness".

Eugene Novikov for Film Blather admired the film, saying that he enjoyed the remake more than the original film. Jonathan Romney of The Guardian also championed the film, writing: "Somehow, Van Sant has managed to spin a big-budget studio project into a piece of conceptual art, a provocative inquiry into the nature of cinematic originality. It's not the full-on 'queer Psycho' that Van Sant fans predicted, but it is an extraordinary drag act".

Leonard Maltin's Movie Guide classified the film as a "bomb", compared to the four-out-of-four stars he gave the original. He describes it as a "slow, stilted, completely pointless scene-for-scene remake of the Hitchcock classic (with a few awkward new touches to taint its claim as an exact replica)". He ultimately calls it "an insult, rather than a tribute, to a landmark film...What promised to be 'Drugstore Cowboy's answer to Hitchcock' is more like Hitchcock's answer to Even Cowgirls Get the Blues."

=== Accolades ===
At the 19th Golden Raspberry Awards, the film was awarded two Golden Raspberry Awards (or "Razzies"), for Worst Remake or Sequel (Note: Tied with Godzilla and The Avengers. It is the only three-way tie in the show's history.) and Worst Director for Gus Van Sant, while Anne Heche was nominated for Worst Actress, where she lost the trophy to the Spice Girls for Spice World. Contrastingly, at the 25th Saturn Awards the film was nominated for the Saturn Awards of Best Supporting Actress for Heche and Best Writing for Joseph Stefano.

=== Home media ===
Universal Pictures Home Entertainment released Psycho on VHS and in a collector's edition DVD on June 8, 1999. In June 2017, Scream Factory released the film on Blu-ray for the first time, which featured a new critical audio commentary, as well as the bonus materials included on Universal's 1999 DVD release.

== Legacy ==
A number of critics and writers viewed Van Sant's version as an experiment in shot-for-shot remakes.

Screenwriter Joseph Stefano, who wrote the original script that was carried over to the remake, thought that although she spoke the same lines, Heche portrays Crane as an entirely different character.

Van Sant later called the film an experiment in appropriation - "If I hold a camera, it's different than if Irving Penn holds it. Even if it's in the same place, it will magically take on his character." One favorable take on the film came from an LA Weekly retrospective article published in 2013, in which writer Vern stated that the film was misunderstood as a commercially motivated film when it was in fact an "experiment" and this was the reason for the poor reception. Vern concluded that "experiments don't always have to work to be worth doing".

The film received a favorable blessing from Hitchcock's daughter Pat Hitchcock, who stated that her father would have been flattered by the remake of his original work.

=== Psychos ===
On February 24, 2014, a mashup of Alfred Hitchcock and Van Sant's versions of Psycho appeared on Steven Soderbergh's Extension 765 website. Retitled Psychos and featuring no explanatory text, the recut appears to be a fan edit of the two films by Soderbergh. The opening credits intermingle names from both the 1960 and 1998 versions, and all color has been removed from Van Sant's scenes with the exception of the infamous shower scene.

== Sources ==
- Derry, Charles (2009). Dark Dreams 2.0: A Psychological History of the Modern Horror Film from the 1950s to the 21st Century (Revised ed.). Jefferson, North Carolina: McFarland. ISBN 978-0-786-45695-6.
- Maltin, Leonard (2009). Leonard Maltin's 2010 Movie Guide. New York City, New York: Penguin. ISBN 978-1-101-10876-5.
- Stanley, John (2000). Creature Features: The Science Fiction, Fantasy, and Horror Movie Guide. New York City, New York: Berkeley Boulevard Books. ISBN 978-0-425-17517-0.
