= Psycho House =

1990 novel by Robert Bloch

- First hardcover edition.
- Author: Robert Bloch
- Language: English
- Genre: Psychological Thriller, mystery, suspense
- Publisher: Tor Books
- Publication date: 1990
- Publication place: United States
- Media type: Print (hardback & paperback)
- ISBN: 0-312-93217-0
- OCLC: 20391667
- Dewey Decimal: 813/.54 20
- LC Class: PS3503.L718 P75 1990
- Preceded by: Psycho II
- Followed by: Robert Bloch's Psycho: Sanitarium

Psycho House (sometimes referred to as Psycho House: Psycho III) is a 1990 horror novel by American writer Robert Bloch. It is a sequel to the 1959 novel Psycho and the 1982 novel Psycho II.

The novel is not related to the 1986 film Psycho III or the 1990 film Psycho IV: The Beginning.

== Plot summary ==
Ten years after Norman Bates' death, a local entrepreneur has rebuilt the Bates Motel in Fairvale as a tourist attraction. Amy Haines travels to the infamous "Psycho House" to write a book about Bates when mysterious murders begin to occur. Haines faces resistance from the community when she enlists the help of a group to investigate the murders.
