= Psycho II (film) =

1983 film by Richard Franklin

- Theatrical release poster
- Directed by: Richard Franklin
- Written by: Tom Holland
- Based on: Characters created by Robert Bloch
- Produced by: Hilton A. Green; Bernard Schwartz
- Starring: Anthony Perkins; Vera Miles; Meg Tilly; Robert Loggia
- Cinematography: Dean Cundey
- Edited by: Andrew London
- Music by: Jerry Goldsmith
- Production companies: Universal Pictures; Oak Industries
- Distributed by: Universal Pictures
- Release date: June 3, 1983
- Running time: 113 minutes
- Country: United States
- Language: English
- Budget: $5 million
- Box office: $34.7 million

Psycho II is a 1983 American psychological slasher film directed by Richard Franklin, written by Tom Holland, and starring Anthony Perkins, Vera Miles, Robert Loggia, and Meg Tilly. It is the first sequel to Alfred Hitchcock's 1960 film Psycho and the second film in the Psycho franchise. Set 22 years after the first film, it follows Norman Bates after he is released from the mental institution and returns to the house and Bates Motel to continue a normal life. However, his troubled past continues to haunt him as someone begins to murder the people around him. The film is unrelated to the 1982 novel Psycho II by Robert Bloch, which he wrote as a sequel to his original 1959 novel Psycho.

In preparing the film, Universal hired Holland to write an entirely different screenplay, while Australian director Franklin, a student of Hitchcock's, was hired to direct. The film marked Franklin's American feature film debut.

Psycho II was released on June 3, 1983, and grossed $34.7 million at the box office on a budget of $5 million. It received generally positive reviews from film critics. The film was followed by Psycho III (1986).

== Plot ==
Norman Bates is released from a mental institution, despite the protests of Marion Crane's sister Lila Loomis. (Note: This story takes place twenty-two years after the events of the first film.) Against the advice of Dr. Bill Raymond, he moves to his old home behind the Bates Motel and starts working in a diner. A waitress there, Mary Samuels, gets thrown out of her boyfriend Scott's place, and Norman offers for her to stay at his home. He later discovers that the motel's new manager, Warren Toomey, is dealing drugs and fires him.

Norman's assimilation into society appears to go well until he begins receiving phone calls and notes from "Mother." A drunk Toomey picks a fight with Norman, who suspects him of leaving the messages. A figure in a black dress later kills Toomey.

After hearing voices in the house, Norman enters his mother's bedroom to find it exactly as it was twenty-two years before. A sound lures him to the attic, where he is locked in. A female figure later appears in front of Josh and Kim, two teenagers who sneak into the basement; Josh is killed, while Kim escapes. In the attic, Mary finds Norman, who shows her his mother's bedroom, only to find it back to its state of disuse. Norman fears he may have killed Josh, since Mary said the attic door was unlocked when she found him.

That evening, Mary meets with Lila, her mother. The two have been making the phone calls and notes. Mary altered the bedroom and locked Norman in the attic so she could change it back. All of this was an attempt to drive him insane again and have him recommitted. However, Mary's growing friendship with Norman has convinced her he is no longer capable of killing. She suspects someone else is in the house, pointing out that Norman was locked in the attic at the time of Josh's death.

Dr. Raymond discovers that Mary is Lila's daughter and suspects the two women must be harassing Norman. Norman does not buy it, saying the one behind everything must be his "real mother", despite there being no record of him being adopted.

While Lila is retrieving her "Mother" costume from the cellar, a shadowy figure murders her. Meanwhile, the police find Toomey's body. Mary runs to the house to try to convince Norman to flee. He answers the phone and starts speaking to "Mother". Mary listens in; nobody is on the line with him. While Norman debates with "Mother" about her command to kill Mary, she dresses as Mother in a bid to get Norman to "hang up". Dr. Raymond grabs her, thinking he has caught her in the act of trying to drive Norman insane, and Mary accidentally kills him with a knife.

When Norman sees "Mother" standing over Dr. Raymond's corpse, his sanity snaps, and he advances upon Mary. Backing into the fruit cellar, she stumbles upon Lila's body. Assuming Norman is responsible, Mary raises her knife to kill him but is shot dead by the incoming police. In light of an overheard argument between Mary and Lila, Mary's attempt to kill Norman, and her dressing as his mother, the police incorrectly determine that Mary committed all the murders.

Later, Miss Emma Spool, another waitress, visits Norman and reveals that she is his biological mother. Mrs. Bates was her sister (Spool being her maiden name) and adopted Norman as an infant while Emma was institutionalized. Emma was the real murderer, having killed anybody who tried to harm her son. In response, Norman kills her and carries the body to Mother's room. He begins talking to himself in her voice, as the "Mother" personality again takes control of his mind.

== Cast ==
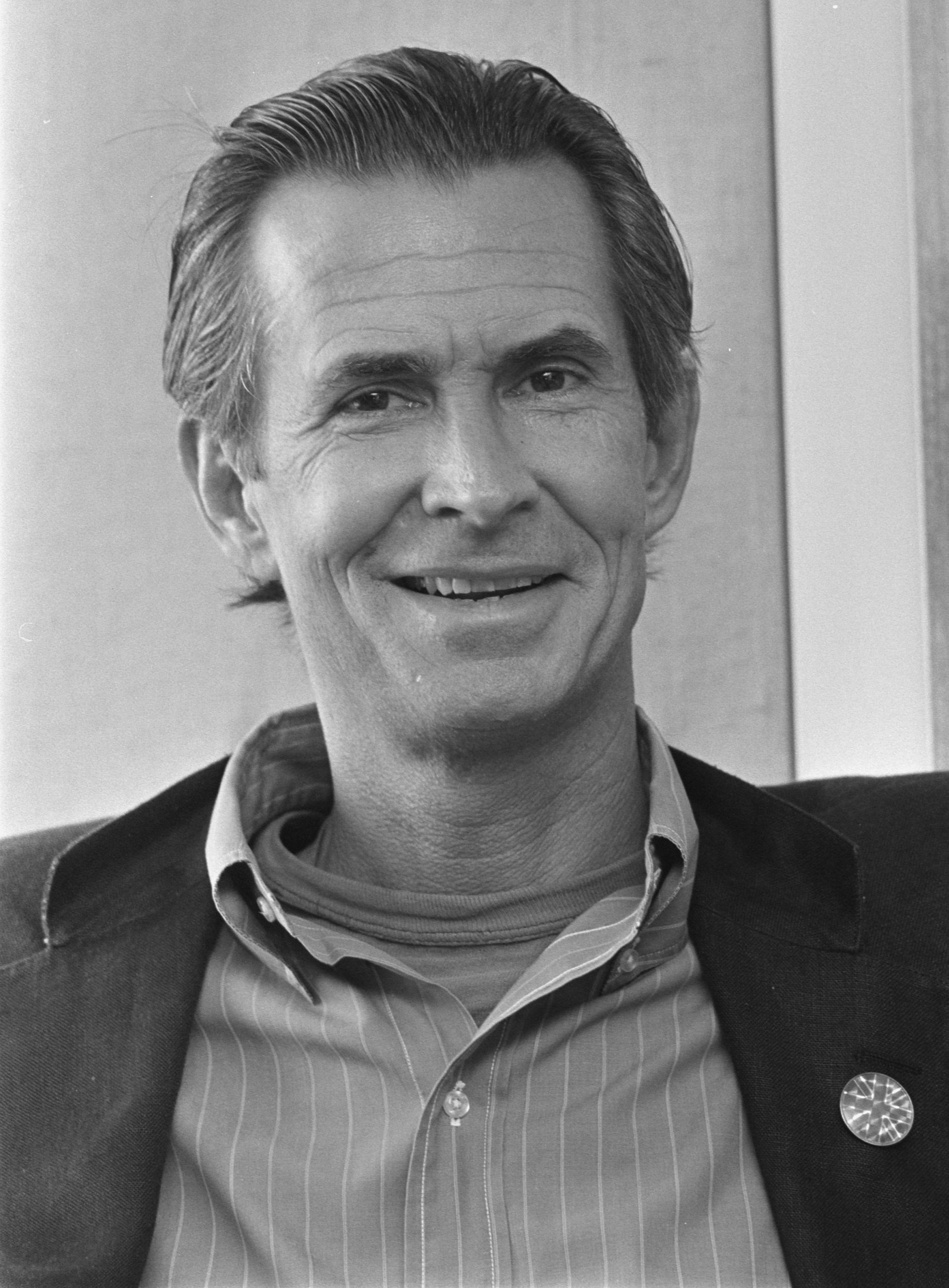
Anthony Perkins in 1983

- Anthony Perkins as Norman Bates
  - Oz Perkins as Young Norman Bates
- Vera Miles as Lila Crane Loomis
- Meg Tilly as Mary Samuels Loomis
- Robert Loggia as Dr. Bill Raymond
- Dennis Franz as Warren Toomey
- Hugh Gillin as Sheriff John Hunt
- Robert Alan Browne as Ralph Statler
- Claudia Bryar as Emma Spool
- Lee Garlington as Myrna
- Jill Caroll as Kim
- Ben Hartigan as Judge
- Tim Maier as Josh

== Production ==
=== Screenplay ===
In 1981, Australian director Richard Franklin was on a couple of panels with Robert Bloch at the SF film convention Cinecon (Sheraton Hotel, Melbourne) at which Bloch was Guest of Honour. In 1982, Bloch published his novel Psycho II, which satirized Hollywood slasher films. Concerned by this, Universal decided to make their own version that differed from Bloch's work. Richard Franklin, who was Alfred Hitchcock's student and even visited him on the set of Topaz, was hired to direct Psycho II on the basis of his earlier Hitchcock-inspired thrillers Patrick and Roadgames. Universal hired writer Tom Holland to write the screenplay.

Hilton A. Green, assistant director of the original Psycho, was contacted and asked if he wanted to produce the film. Green, fearing that Hitchcock might not have approved of sequels to his films, contacted Hitchcock's daughter Patricia Hitchcock and sent her the script for the film. Patricia Hitchcock gave her blessing, saying that her father would have loved it.

Originally, the film was intended as a made-for-cable production. Anthony Perkins initially turned down the offer to reprise the role of Norman Bates, but after he read the script, he agreed to do the film. Perkins said: "When I received Tom Holland's script, I liked it very much. It was really Norman's story..." Before landing Perkins, the studio was exploring recasting the role of Norman and Christopher Walken was among those considered. Vera Miles also returned as Marion Crane (Janet Leigh)'s sister Lila Crane Loomis, but John Gavin was unavailable to reprise his role as Sam Loomis after being appointed U.S. Ambassador to Mexico by President Ronald Reagan. Originally Jamie Lee Curtis, the real-life daughter of Janet Leigh, who played Marion Crane in the original film, was sought to portray Lila and Sam's daughter Mary before Meg Tilly was cast.

=== Filming ===
Principal photography of Psycho II took place at Universal Studios in Universal City, California on Soundstage 24 from June 30–August 13, 1982. The Bates house set was still standing from 1960, but the motel had to be reconstructed. Similarly to the original film, it was mostly shot on the Universal backlot and in a number of sound stages. Several props and set pieces from the original film were found by set designers John W. Corso and Julie Fletcher, including two Tiffany lamps, the stuffed owl and raven, the brass hands seen in Mrs. Norma Bates's bedroom, the bedroom fireplace, the Victorian bed and armoire, and the 40-foot-long threadbare runner for the staircase. The exterior of the house featured in the original film was relocated to a different section of the Universal Studios lot for the production. The town of Fairvale, seen when Lila Loomis is tailed by Dr. Bill Raymond (Robert Loggia) is actually Courthouse Square, which is probably best known for its appearance in Back to the Future (1985), located on the Universal Studios backlot.

Both Franklin and Holland wanted the film to be a tribute to Alfred Hitchcock and the original film. To accomplish this, they added various in-jokes such as the scene when Mary and Norman first go into Norman's mother's room, before they turn the lights on, Alfred Hitchcock's silhouette is visible on the wall to the far right. Franklin also repeated various shots from the original film such as the shot where Norman walks into the kitchen and sets his jacket down on the chair. As with the first film, the final pages of the shooting script were not given to the cast and crew until the last day of filming.

The final shot of Norman standing in front of the house was used as a Christmas card for various crew members. When Universal presented concept art for the one sheet film poster, director Franklin was not pleased with it. It was editor Andrew London who came up with the idea of using the Christmas card photo as the film poster and also came up with the tagline: It's 22 years later and Norman Bates is coming home.

Reflecting on the shoot, Franklin recalled Perkins as being "very generous" on-set, and praised Miles as a "powerhouse" and "one of the most forceful" actors he had worked with. Reportedly, Perkins and Tilly did not get along well during filming.

== Music ==
Composer John Williams was considered to do the score for the film, but it was decided to go with composer Jerry Goldsmith. Goldsmith was a long-time friend of original film composer Bernard Herrmann. On some film assignments Goldsmith would discover that the director had used some of Herrmann's music from other films as temporary soundtracks. Goldsmith would often joke when he discovered this ("Not Benny again!"); when he conducted a rerecording of "The Murder" for the opening of Psycho II he suggested that Herrmann "must be rolling over in his grave".

Goldsmith had written a theme for Norman Bates that was rejected but used for the second segment of Twilight Zone: The Movie.

MCA Records released a 30-minute album on LP and cassette; in 2014 Intrada issued the complete score.

Psycho II

Studio album
- Released: 1983
- Genre: Film score
- Length: 30:24 (original release); 74:10 (2014 reissue)
- Label: MCA/Universal

Alternative cover

MCA track listing (1983; MCA-6119)
| No. | Title | Writer(s) | Length |
|---|---|---|---|
| 1. | "The Murder" | Bernard Herrmann | 0:51 |
| 2. | "Main Title" | | 1:37 |
| 3. | "Don't Take Me" | | 4:48 |
| 4. | "Mother's Room" | | 4:01 |
| 5. | "It's Not Your Mother" | | 5:11 |
| 6. | "New Furniture" | | 2:04 |
| 7. | "The Cellar" | | 4:02 |
| 8. | "Blood Bath" | | 3:37 |
| 9. | "End Title" | | 4:13 |

Intrada track listing (2014)
| No. | Title | Writer(s) | Length |
|---|---|---|---|
| 1. | "The Murder" | Bernard Herrmann | 0:59 |
| 2. | "Main Title" | | 1:39 |
| 3. | "The House" | | 1:51 |
| 4. | "Mother's Hand" | | 1:54 |
| 5. | "Old Weapons" | | 0:41 |
| 6. | "Cheese Sandwich" | | 0:31 |
| 7. | "Mother's Room" (previously titled "New Furniture") | | 2:05 |
| 8. | "Out to Lunch" | | 2:00 |
| 9. | "No Note" | | 1:05 |
| 10. | "The Peep Hole" | | 1:47 |
| 11. | "Toomey's Death" | | 1:11 |
| 12. | "Peep Hole #2" | | 0:55 |
| 13. | "Mother's Room #2" (previously titled "Mother's Room") | | 4:28 |
| 14. | "Basement Killing" | | 1:18 |
| 15. | "New Furniture" | | 0:44 |
| 16. | "It's Starting Again" | | 0:40 |
| 17. | "A Night Cap" | | 1:08 |
| 18. | "Blood Bath" | | 4:01 |
| 19. | "Don't Take Me" | | 5:39 |
| 20. | "She's Not Dead" | | 1:16 |
| 21. | "Hello Mother" | | 2:52 |
| 22. | "The Cellar" | | 4:48 |
| 23. | "It's Not Your Mother" | | 5:11 |
| 24. | "Expected Guest" | | 2:44 |
| 25. | "End Title" (revised) | | 4:18 |
| 26. | "Sonata #14 (Moonlight), Op. 27, No. 2 – 1st Mvt" | Ludwig van Beethoven | 1:51 |
| 27. | "Sonata #8 (Pathetique), Op. 13 – 2nd Mvt" | Beethoven | 1:04 |
| 28. | "Peep Hole #2" (original) | | 0:56 |
| 29. | "Mother's Room #2" (alternate no. 1) | | 4:28 |
| 30. | "Mother's Room #2" (alternate no. 2) | | 4:28 |
| 31. | "End Title" (original) | | 4:18 |
| Total length: | | | 74:10 |

== Release ==
In an interview with Josh Korngut at Dread Central, screenwriter Tom Holland confirmed that Universal initially intended to release the film directly to cable, but decided upon a full theatrical release after the production secured the return of actor Anthony Perkins. When the film opened on June 3, 1983, it earned $8,310,244 in its opening weekend at No. 2 (behind Return of the Jedi) and went on to gross over $34 million.

=== Home media ===
Psycho II has been released five times on DVD. The initial release came in 1999 when Universal Pictures leased the film out to GoodTimes Home Video in a 1.33:1 open matte transfer. The second release came in 2005 from Universal itself. The third release came in 2007 as part of a triple feature package with Psycho III and Psycho IV: The Beginning. Shout Factory, under their Scream Factory logo, released Psycho II on DVD & Blu-Ray on September 24, 2013, under their "Collector's Edition" line-up.

RiffTrax released a VOD commentary on the film in May 2013. Universal released Psycho II, Psycho III, Psycho IV: The Beginning and the 1987 TV-movie Bates Motel on DVD as part of its "4-Movie Midnight Marathon Pack" in September 2014.

== Reception ==
=== Box office ===
Psycho II debuted at number two at the U.S. box office during its opening weekend, earning $8,310,244 playing at 1,448 theaters. The film went on to gross a total of $34,725,614.

=== Critical response ===
==== Contemporary ====
Variety deemed the film "an impressive, 23-years-after followup to Alfred Hitchcock's 1960 suspense classic". Vincent Canby of The New York Times wrote that the film "has all of the characteristics of a conventional sequel to Hitchcock's 1960 classic but, as you watch it, you may feel as if you're seeing a couple of precocious film students play with artifacts found in the Hitchcock mausoleum". Gary Arnold, writing for The Washington Post, was less laudatory, referring to the film as "a travesty masquerading as a sequel...if Franklin had any respect for the source material, he might feel a little protective and avoid outrages as conceptually, as well as literally, nasty as the treatment of Vera Miles' character. Psycho II transforms her once sympathetic, heroic supporting role into a hateful bit part and then kills her off with a revoltingly obscene flourish. Has movie storytelling broken down this grotesquely in 23 years?"

Roger Ebert wrote that, while the film sustained the suspenseful atmosphere of the original and is better than the average slasher film, the film was too heavy on the plot and was too willing to cheat about its plot to be successful. Roger & Gene Siskel agreed the film was well-made but also gave it thumbs-down reviews on their TV show, ultimately also agreeing that it was not really a necessary film. A review published in the Detroit Free Press praised the film as "jumpy fun" and "another cult film in the making".

Christopher John reviewed Psycho II in Ares Magazine #15 and commented that "the real importance of Psycho II rests in its originality. Refusing to be just a blood-letting free-for-all, the picture goes to great lengths to create an entirely new story".

C.J. Henderson reviewed Psycho II for Fantasy Gamer magazine and stated that "There is, in the final analysis, nothing to complain about in this film, It is faithful to the original. Franklin has done his utmost to recreate a Hitchcockian mood in his directions, as has Goldsmith in recapturing Bernard Herrmann's famous, frightening soundtrack, Perkins' performance is flawless, generating sympathy for the character. He is so believably Norman Bates again that the film takes on the quality of a documentary, rather than a mere suspense picture. By the film's end, he convinces us that it is the world which is insane, not Norman, and that Norman would have been better off had he stayed locked away from it. The filmmakers have cast a shadow over the society we live in. Psycho II is far more than most people expected it to be."

==== Retrospective ====
Film scholar John Kenneth Muir praised the film's depiction of Bates in "human, realistic terms", deeming it "admirably frank and sincere" and "a great film on its own merits". In Empire, film critic Kim Newman gave the film three out of five stars, calling Psycho II "a smart, darkly-comic thriller with some imaginative twists. The wittiest dark joke is that the entire world wants Norman to be mad, and 'normality' can only be restored if he's got a mummified mother in the window and is ready to kill again".

On Rotten Tomatoes, a review aggregator, it holds an approval rating of 67% and an average rating of 5.70/10 based on 39 reviews. The site's critics consensus states: "Although it can't hold a cleaver to the classic original, Psycho II succeeds well enough on its own merits to satisfy horror fans." Metacritic, which uses a weighted average, assigned the film a score of 54 out of 100, based on 13 critics, indicating "mixed or average" reviews.

When asked his thoughts in 2015, writer Tom Holland replied: "We should have called it something other than Psycho, because it had no more than a passing resemblance to the original. What we did to Norman Bates and Lila Loomis was criminal". He added: "Outside of that, it was wonderful".

Filmmaker Quentin Tarantino has said this was Perkins' best performance of his career. Tarantino also said he prefers the sequel to the original film.

== Sources ==
- McCarty, John (1990). The Modern Horror Film. Citadel Press. ISBN 0806511648.
- Muir, John Kenneth (2012). Horror Films of the 1980s. Vol. 1. Jefferson, N.C.: McFarland. ISBN 978-0-786-47298-7.
- O'Regan, Tom (1996). Australian National Cinema. Psychology Press. ISBN 978-0-415-05731-8.
