= Psycho II (novel) =

1982 novel by Robert Bloch

- First edition hardcover
- Author: Robert Bloch
- Language: English
- Genre: Thriller, horror
- Publisher: Whispers Press
- Publication date: 1982
- Publication place: United States
- Media type: Print (hardback & paperback)
- ISBN: 0-918372-08-9
- OCLC: 8926424
- Preceded by: Psycho
- Followed by: Psycho House

Psycho II is a 1982 horror novel by American writer Robert Bloch. It is a sequel to his 1959 novel Psycho. The novel was completed before the screenplay was written for the unrelated 1983 film Psycho II. According to Bloch, Universal Studios loathed the novel, which was intended to critique Hollywood Slasher films. A different story was created for the film and Bloch was not invited to any screenings. Bloch declined Universal's suggestion that he abandon his novel and released it, achieving good sales.

== Plot summary ==
In a mental asylum, psychiatrist Dr. Adam Claiborne has spent the last two decades working with patient Norman Bates (Note: He was committed there at the end of the novel Psycho.) and has hopes of one day becoming famous by curing him. His plans come crashing down after Norman strangles a visiting nun with her rosary beads, steals her outfit and walks out. Norman gets in the van with another visiting nun, kills her with a tire iron and rapes her dead body. While driving away, Norman spots a hitchhiker and picks him up with plans to kill him and use his body to fake his death.

Later that night, the police find the van on fire with the charred remains of the nun and an unidentified man presumed to be Norman. Since this happened at the same time as a massive car pileup, they are exhausting their resources trying to identify the victims to notify their next of kin and cannot get around to positively identifying Norman's remains.

Across town, Sam and Lila Loomis are murdered by an assailant with a knife. Claiborne is convinced that Norman faked his death and proceeded to kill them, but the police are skeptical. While surveying the crime scene, they see a news article about a movie being made based on Norman's life. Claiborne thinks that Norman is going to Hollywood to kill everybody involved in production, and heads out there to stop him.

To keep an eye on everything, Claiborne gets a job as a technical consultant on the film. He is introduced to the cast and crew, including director Santo Vizzini, who is the spitting image of what Norman looked like before escaping the asylum. Claiborne keeps thinking that something bad is going to happen, but nobody believes him until the movie's producer is killed with a meat cleaver.

At the scene of the crime, Claiborne and screenwriter Roy Ames find out about Vizzini's past: his mother was raped and murdered when he was a child. Meanwhile, Vizzini calls the actress playing Marion Crane to the studio where the shower scene is going to be shot, under the guise of rehearsing the scene, but he is really planning on raping and murdering her. It turns out that his childhood trauma has affected his sexual morality.

Claiborne gets a bad feeling about Vizzini and heads over to the studio to stop him. Moments after he leaves, the phone rings and Ames answers it only to be in touch with the officer investigating Norman's disappearance. They have conclusively identified the charred remains in the van as Norman's. It turns out that while Norman planned on killing the hitchhiker to fake his death, the hitchhiker actually overpowered Norman and killed him in self-defense. He had a criminal record and was worried about returning to jail, so he burned the van to hide the evidence and went into hiding. However, the hitchhiker really thought he was killing a nun instead of a disguised Norman. The thought of killing a nun weighed on his conscience and he eventually turned himself in. Ames concludes that if Norman is dead, Vizzini must be the killer and requests officers to go to the studio.

Meanwhile, Vizzini tries to rape the actress. However, she kicks him hard enough to send him into the prop shower behind the curtain. Vizzini screams and emerges with a stab wound before dropping dead. The assailant then takes the knife and approaches the actress. However, before he can stab her, the police show up and shoot him. As he falls, he is revealed to be none other than Claiborne. He survives the shooting and ends up committed to the very asylum that Norman spent twenty years in.

Claiborne's colleague deduces that he put so much time and energy into Norman that when he died, Claiborne realized he would never get the fame he wished for and the trauma of this reality gave him Norman's split personality. This personality killed Sam and Lila, Vizzini and the producer. Now, his colleague is hoping that he will one day be cured, but he is not very optimistic.

== Reception ==
Dave Pringle reviewed Psycho II for Imagine magazine, and stated that "Psycho 2 is in the same genre as Red Dragon (psychological/murder/horror), but it is much cruder and much less believable".

== Reviews ==
- Review by Debbie Notkin (1982) in Locus, #261 October 1982
- Review by David Sherman (1982) in Fangoria, November 1982
- Review by Gene DeWeese (1982) in Science Fiction Review, Winter 1982
- Review by Michael E. Stamm (1982) in Science Fiction & Fantasy Book Review, #10, December 1982
- Review by Bob Collins (1982) in Fantasy Newsletter, #54 December 1982
- Review by Chris Henderson (1982) in Dragon Magazine, December 1982
- Review by Robert M. Price (1983) in Crypt of Cthulhu, #15 Lammas 1983
- Review by Joe Sanders (1983) in Starship, Winter 1983-84
- Review by John Gregory Betancourt (1988) in Weird Tales, Summer 1988
