= The Law and the Lady =

The Law and the Lady may refer to:

- The Law and the Lady (novel), an 1875 detective story by Wilkie Collins
- The Law and the Lady (1924 film), an American silent drama film
- The Law and the Lady (1951 film), an American comedy film
