= Claudia Bryar =

American actress (1918–2011)

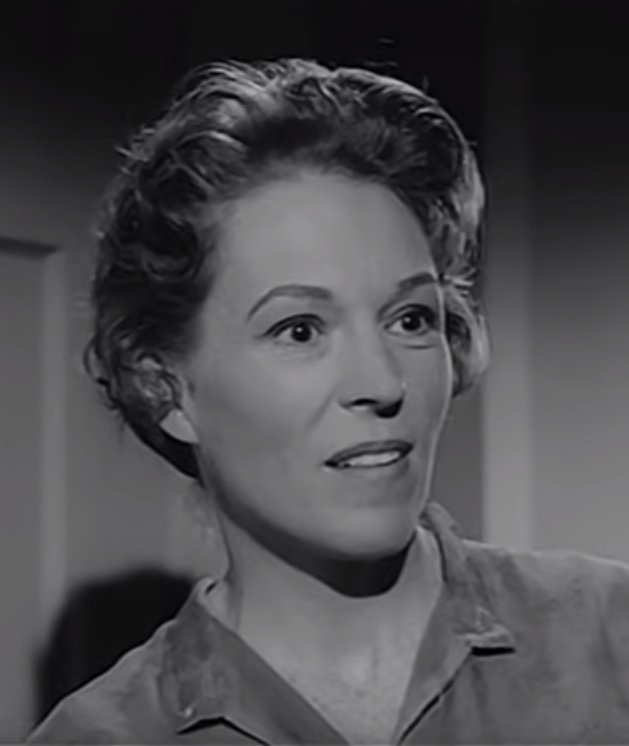
- Bryar in the TV series The Veil, episode Girl on the Road, 1958
- Born: Hortense Rizley; May 18, 1918; Guymon, Oklahoma, U.S.
- Died: June 16, 2011 (aged 93); Los Angeles, California, U.S.
- Occupation: Actress
- Years active: 1955–1986
- Spouse(s): Paul Bryar (m. 19??; his death 1985)
- Children: 3
- Father: Ross Rizley

Claudia Bryar (née Hortense Rizley; May 18, 1918 – June 16, 2011) was an American actress. She portrayed Emma Spool in the film Psycho II (1983). Claudia Bryar died on June 16th, 2011 in Los Angeles, California of natural causes. Claudia Bryar was 93 years old.

== Early years ==
Bryar was the daughter of Mr. and Mrs. Ross Rizley. Her mother was born Ruby Elaine Seal, and her father was a congressman and federal judge. She was one of seven children. She participated in a radio broadcast in 1935 when her expression class presented a play on WKY in Oklahoma City. She attended Central High School in Oklahoma City while Amzie Strickland was a student there. As a freshman at Oklahoma City University she had the female lead in the play Death Takes a Holiday in May 1937.

== Career ==
Active from the 1950s to the 1980s, she gained early acting experience with the Pasadena Playhouse, where she performed "in numerous productions". She also acted at the Las Palmas Theater and the Players Ring.

She appeared in such television series as Wanted Dead or Alive, Gunsmoke, Bonanza, The Guns of Will Sonnett, The Real McCoys, The Bob Newhart Show, The Twilight Zone, Leave It to Beaver, Dennis the Menace, The Andy Griffith Show, and Gomer Pyle, U.S.M.C. Her last television role was in an episode of Hill Street Blues.

She appeared in such films as I Was a Teenage Frankenstein (1957), Bad Company (1972), Pat Garrett and Billy the Kid (1973), and as Mrs. Emma Spool in Psycho II (1983) and Psycho III (1986). She appeared in such made-for-TV movies as The Family Nobody Wanted (1975) and Alexander: The Other Side of Dawn (1977).

== Personal life ==
Bryar married actor Paul Bryar (born Gabriel Paul Barrere) on February 3, 1940, in Guymon. They remained wed until his death in 1985. The couple had three children, including Paul Barrere, guitarist and singer with the rock band Little Feat. On June 16, 2011, Bryar died in Los Angeles at the age of 93.

== Filmography ==
=== Film ===
Year	Title	Role	Notes
1956	The Houston Story	Clara Phelan	Uncredited
1956	Giant	Older Beauty Operator	Uncredited
1956	The Wrong Man	Small Role	Uncredited
1957	I Was a Teenage Frankenstein	Arlene's Mother	
1957	The Monolith Monsters	Mrs. Simpson	Uncredited
1958	The True Story of Lynn Stuart	Nora Efron	Uncredited
1960	Elmer Gantry	Religious woman collecting money in opening scene	Uncredited
1966	A Big Hand for the Little Lady	Mrs. Price	Uncredited
1967	The Ride to Hangman's Tree	Mrs. Harmon	
1968	The Shakiest Gun in the West	Mrs. Remington	Uncredited
1969	Angel in My Pocket	Mrs. Axel Gresham	
1969	Chicago, Chicago	Mother	aka Gaily, Gaily
1971	Lawman	Woman Who Yells 'Murderer!'	Uncredited
1971	Shoot Out	Storekeeper's Wife	Uncredited
1972	Bad Company	Mrs. Clum	
1973	Ace Eli and Rodger of the Skies	Ann	
1973	Pat Garrett & Billy the Kid	Mrs. Horrell	
1983	Psycho II	Mrs. Emma Spool	
1986	Psycho III	Mrs. Emma Spool	Flashback, uncredited

=== Television ===
Year	Title	Role	Notes
1955	TV Reader's Digest	Actress	Season 2 Episode 1: "Child Pioneer"
1955–1957	Jane Wyman Presents The Fireside Theatre	Actress / Martha	2 episodes
1956	Father Knows Best	Miss Woodruff Teacher (uncredited) / Miss Woodruff	2 episodes
1956	Medic	Deborah Beaumont	Season 2 Episode 18: "Who Search for Truth"
1956	The Millionaire	Frances Davis	Season 2 Episode 31: "The Ed Murdock Story"
1956	The Life of Riley	Marge	Season 4 Episode 35: "From Rags to Riches"
1956	Celebrity Playhouse	Mrs. Weston	Season 1 Episode 37: "Faith"
1956	Chevron Hall of Stars	Actress	Episode: "Flowers for Charlie McDaniels"
1956	State Trooper	Jane Andrews Blackmore	Season 1 Episode 10: "One Way to Tahoe"
1956–1958	Dragnet	Actress / Edith Tamber	2 episodes
1957	Schlitz Playhouse of Stars	Actress	Season 6 Episode 19: "One Left Over"
1957	Telephone Time	Mrs. Quist	Season 2 Episode 31: "Stranded"
1957	Tales of Wells Fargo	Mrs. Turner	Season 1 Episode 7: "The Lynching"
1957	Code 3	Millie Cushman	Season 1 Episode 16: "An Ounce of Prevention"
1957	The Sheriff of Cochise	Anna / Vera Bennett	2 episodes
1957	The Web	Actress	Season 1 Episode 10: "The Man Below"
1957	Perry Mason	Ruth Marvel	Season 1 Episode 3: "The Case of the Nervous Accomplice"
1957	Official Detective	Mrs. Foster	Season 1 Episode 18: "The Deserted House"
1957	The Real McCoys	Mrs. Daniels	Season 1 Episode 5: "A Question of Discipline"
1957–1959	The Life and Legend of Wyatt Earp	Mrs. Brown (uncredited) / Madge Horton	2 episodes
1958	Buckskin	Sara Taliaferro	Season 1 Episode 8: "Tree of Death"
1958	Goodyear Theatre	Delia	Season 2 Episode 1: "The Chain and the River"
1958	Cimarron City	Mrs. Randall	Season 1 Episode 1: "I, the People"
1958	Westinghouse Desilu Playhouse	Actress	Season 1 Episode 1: "Song of Bernadette"
1958	Maverick	Mrs. Pyne	Season 2 Episode 8: "The Jail at Junction Flats"
1958	The Veil	Mrs. Kirby	Season 1 Episode 2: "Girl on the Road"
1958–1959	Playhouse 90	Mrs. Longley / Mrs. Jackson	2 episodes
1958–1962	Leave It to Beaver	Mrs. Dennison / Librarian / Mrs. Harris / Mrs. Bates	4 episodes
1958–1963	Wagon Train	Mrs. Mayhew / Mrs. Taylor / Mrs. Moore / Ada Hale / Mary Carter / Mrs. Baxter	6 episodes
1959	The DuPont Show with June Allyson	Mrs. Crawford / Dr. West	2 episodes
1960	The Betty Hutton Show	Miss Jones	Season 1 Episode 27: "The School Bully"
1960	77 Sunset Strip	Grace Connors	Season 2 Episode 31: "Fraternity of Fear"
1960	Wanted: Dead or Alive	Emily Kendrick	Season 3 Episode 2: "The Cure"
1960	Sugarfoot	Ada Smallwood	Season 4 Episode 2: "A Noose for Nora"
1960	Death Valley Days	Mary Taggert / Ellie	2 episodes
1960–1972	Bonanza	Mary Logan / Mrs. Weems / Mrs. Scott / Martha	4 episodes
1961	The Tom Ewell Show	Birdie	Season 1 Episode 13: "Try It On for Size"
1961	Hot Off the Wire	Mrs. Cleaver	Season 1 Episode 15: "Piano Prodigy"
1961	Dennis the Menace	Miss Morrison	Season 2 Episode 17: "Pythias Was a Piker"
1961	Lawman	Clara Weston	Season 3 Episode 34: "The Trial"
1961	Target: The Corruptors	Actress	Season 1 Episode 3: "The Platinum Highway"
1961	Bus Stop	Miss Toland	Season 1 Episode 6: "The Glass Jungle"
1961	The Fisher Family	Mrs. Hearn	Episode: "The Richest Man in the World"
1961–1965	The Andy Griffith Show	Jennie Boone / Ruth	2 episodes
1961–1966	Dr. Kildare	Mary Adams / Nurse Maggie Simpson / Elsie / Nurse (uncredited) / Nurse	5 episodes
1962	The Untouchables	Mrs. Phelps	Season 3 Episode 13: "The Gang War"
1962	Stoney Burke	Mrs. Miller	Season 1 Episode 2: "Fight Night"
1963	The Twilight Zone	Frau Nielsen	Season 4 Episode 5: "Mute"
1963	Ben Casey	Laura Vetley	Season 2 Episode 19: "A Short Biographical Sketch of James Tuttle Peabody, M.D."
1963	The Virginian	Miss Jensen	Season 1 Episode 21: "The Small Parade"
1963	Mr. Novak	Mrs. Harrison	Season 1 Episode 7: "Hello, Miss Phipps"
1963–1967	The Fugitive	Mrs. Sturgis / Housekeeper / Mrs. Blake	3 episodes
1965	No Time for Sergeants	Actress	Season 1 Episode 24: "It Shouldn't Happen to a Sergeant"
1965	Run for Your Life	Loomis' Secretary	Season 1 Episode 9: "This Town for Sale"
1965–1968	Gomer Pyle, U.S.M.C.	Lottie Caldwell / Maude Purcell	2 episodes
1966	Laredo	Mrs. Cook	Season 1 Episode 25: "A Very Small Assignment"
1966–1971	The F.B.I.	Mrs. Patterson / Mrs. Lee / Sara, Bookstore Employee / Clerk / Mrs. Ryerson	5 episodes
1967	Occasional Wife	Mrs. Cartwright	Season 1 Episode 21: "The New Secretary"
1967	The Invaders	Townswoman	Season 2 Episode 4: "Valley of the Shadow"
1967	The Guns of Will Sonnett	Mrs. Stevens	Season 1 Episode 8: "Meeting at Devil's Fork"
1967–1968	The Big Valley	Lady / Florence Bacon	2 episodes
1969	The Immortal	Nurse	Season 1 Episode 0: "Pilot"
1969	The Courtship of Eddie's Father	Mrs. Thaler	Season 1 Episode 9: "Gentleman Friend"
1969	The Ballad of Andy Crocker	Emily Crocker	TV Movie
1969–1970	The Mod Squad	Mrs. Jackson / Mother Superior	2 episodes
1970	That Girl	Mona	Season 4 Episode 17: "That Metermaid"
1970	Nancy	Mrs. Wilson	Season 1 Episode 2: "Guess Who's Coming to the White House?"
1970	Dan August	Woman in Church	Season 1 Episode 5: "In the Eyes of God"
1970	Bracken's World	Housekeeper	Season 2 Episode 6: "The Mary Tree"
1970	The Bold Ones: The Lawyers	Clara Stockton	Season 2 Episode 4: "The People Against Doctor Chapman"
1970–1973	Mannix	Landlady (uncredited) / Old Lady	2 episodes
1970–1974	Ironside	Laura / Mrs. Larkin	2 episodes
1971	Alias Smith and Jones	Minerva Lambert	Season 1 Episode 5: "The Girl in Boxcar #3"
1971	Sarge	Old Woman	Season 1 Episode 11: "A Company of Victims"
1971–1973	Gunsmoke	Mauda Weaver / Nell Bronson	2 episodes
1972	Welcome Home, Johnny Bristol	Mrs. Thysen	TV Movie
1972	Jigsaw	Motel Manager	TV Movie
1972	The Daughters of Joshua Cabe	Warden Tippet	TV Movie
1972	The Bold Ones: The New Doctors	Switchboard Operator	Season 4 Episode 1: "Five Days in the Death of Sgt. Brown: Part II"
1972–1973	The Rookies	Vera / Mrs. Mayson	2 episodes
1973	Letters from Three Lovers	Apartment Manager (segment: "Dear Vincent")	TV Movie
1973	A Summer Without Boys	Mrs. Battle	TV Movie
1973	Love Story	Mrs. Lewin	Season 1 Episode 8: "When the Girls Came Out to Play"
1973–1975	The Waltons	Nurse Stewart / Nurse Howard	2 episodes
1973–1979	Barnaby Jones	Mary Wheelock / Emily Kates / Sister Agnes Elizabeth / Ellen Coogan / Mrs. Pomeroy	5 episodes
1974	Manhunter	Mrs. Barrett	TV Movie
1974	The Manhunter	Mary Barrett	2 episodes
1974	The F.B.I. Story: The FBI Versus Alvin Karpis, Public Enemy Number One	Landlady	TV Movie
1974	Marcus Welby, M.D.	Mrs. Grande / Nurse Grande	2 episodes
1975	The Family Nobody Wanted	Eunice Franklin	TV Movie
1975	Petrocelli	Mrs. Brancussi	Season 1 Episode 22: "A Night of Terror"
1975	Matt Helm	Grandmother	Season 1 Episode 6: "Squeeze Play"
1975	The Blue Knight	Mrs. Bridger	Season 1 Episode 1: "Two to Make Deadly"
1976	The Bob Newhart Show	Mrs. Firman	Season 4 Episode 21: "Guaranteed Not to Shrink"
1976	The Streets of San Francisco	Ann Corby / Mrs. Thompson	2 episodes
1976	Most Wanted	Mary Callaghan	Season 1 Episode 8: "The Ten-Percenter"
1977	Green Eyes	Mrs. Cousins	TV Movie
1977	Tales of the Unexpected	Woman in Diner	Season 1 Episode 4: "The Nomads"
1977	Alexander: The Other Side of Dawn	Ms. Mathias	TV Movie
1978	Suddenly, Love		TV Movie
1979	Quincy M.E.	Mrs. Hokans	Season 4 Episode 16: "Aftermath"
1979	CHiPs	Matronly Lady	Season 3 Episode 1: "Roller Disco: Part 1"
1979	240-Robert	Lady #1	Season 1 Episode 8: "Time Bomb"
1981	Dallas	Dolores, Cleaning Lady	2 episodes
1982	McClain's Law	Dora Norton	Season 1 Episode 13: "Takeover"
1983	Who Will Love My Children?	Director of Home	TV Movie
1983	Dynasty	Doris	Season 3 Episode 19: "Fathers and Sons"
1986	The Twilight Zone	Townsperson #1 (segment: "Welcome to Winfield")	Season 1 Episode 17: "Welcome to Winfield/Quarantine"
1986	Hill Street Blues	Mrs. Prince	Season 6 Episode 22: "Come and Get It"
