= Lawman =

Lawman is a term used in reference to an American law enforcement officer, usually a sheriff or a marshal.

Lawman may also refer to the Scandinavian legal office discussed under lawspeaker.

== Television and film titles ==
- Lawman (TV series), a hit American western series produced in 1958–62 by Warner Bros. and starring John Russell as Marshal Dan Troop on the ABC network
- Lawman (film), American western directed in 1971 by Michael Winner and starring Burt Lancaster as Marshal Jared Maddox
- Justified (TV series), (originally named Lawman) an American crime drama created by Graham Yost broadcast on FX
- Steven Seagal: Lawman, a program on A&E starring Steven Seagal

== Other uses ==
- Lawman (late 12th century – early 13th century), English poet; first known writer on subject of Arthurian legends; usually referenced as Layamon
- LAWMAN, Danish cartoon figure structured as satire of American superheroes; created in 2002 by Erwin Neutzsky-Wulff and drawn by Jørgen Bitsch
- Lawman (horse) (born 2004), French thoroughbred racer; winner of 2007 Prix du Jockey Club
- Law Man, stage name of Hong Kong singer Roman Tam
- Ian Lawman, British television personality
