= Monster: The Jeffrey Dahmer Story =

Dahmer – Monster: The Jeffrey Dahmer Story
- Promotional release poster
- Showrunners: Ryan Murphy; Ian Brennan
- Starring: Evan Peters; Richard Jenkins; Molly Ringwald; Niecy Nash; Michael Learned
- No. of episodes: 10

Release
- Original network: Netflix
- Original release: September 21, 2022

Season chronology
- Next → The Lyle and Erik Menendez Story

Dahmer – Monster: The Jeffrey Dahmer Story (Note: The series was originally announced under the title Monster: The Jeffrey Dahmer Story, with Dahmer (stylized in all caps) later added as the main title; on Netflix, Dahmer is treated as the main series title with its single "season" using the original name. Monster subsequently became the overall title for the anthology series.) is the first season of the American biographical crime drama anthology television series Monster, created by Ryan Murphy and Ian Brennan for Netflix, which was released on September 21, 2022. Murphy and Brennan both serve as showrunners. Dahmer is about the life of serial killer Jeffrey Dahmer (Evan Peters). Other main characters include Dahmer's father, Lionel (Richard Jenkins), his stepmother Shari (Molly Ringwald), suspicious neighbor Glenda (Niecy Nash), and grandmother Catherine (Michael Learned).

Dahmer received mixed reviews, as well as an overwhelmingly negative response from families of Dahmer's real-life victims. However, it was ultimately a commercial success, reaching the number-one spot on Netflix in the first week of its release. The season became Netflix's second most-watched English-language series of all time within 28 days, and the third Netflix series to pass 1 billion hours viewed in 60 days. The series reached number one on the Nielsen Top 10 streaming chart in the first week of its release, and placed No. 7 on Nielsen's all-time list for single-week viewership in its second week.

The season received four nominations at the 80th Golden Globe Awards, including for the Best Limited or Anthology Series or Television Film, with Peters winning for Best Actor – Miniseries or Television Film. It received 13 nominations at the 75th Primetime Emmy Awards, including Outstanding Limited or Anthology Series and Outstanding Lead Actor in a Limited or Anthology Series or Movie for Peters. Ultimately, Nash won for Outstanding Supporting Actress in a Limited or Anthology Series or Movie.

The second season of the anthology, Monsters: The Lyle and Erik Menendez Story (2024), is based on the parricide case of the Menendez brothers and was released on September 19, 2024.

== Synopsis ==
The season focuses on the life of Jeffrey Dahmer, and how he became one of the most notorious serial killers in America. His murders were executed in Bath Township, Ohio, West Allis, Wisconsin, and Milwaukee, Wisconsin, between 1978 and 1991. The season dramatizes instances where Dahmer was nearly apprehended until his ultimate conviction and death. It also explores how police racial bias and apathy contributed to enabling his crimes.

== Cast and characters ==
=== Main ===
- Evan Peters as Jeffrey Dahmer, the titular serial killer
  - Nick A. Fisher as young Jeffrey
- Richard Jenkins as Lionel Dahmer, Jeffrey's father
  - Josh Braaten as young Lionel
- Molly Ringwald as Shari Dahmer, Lionel's second wife and Jeffrey's stepmother
- Niecy Nash as Glenda Cleveland, Jeffrey's neighbor
- Michael Learned as Catherine Dahmer, Jeffrey's paternal grandmother

=== Recurring ===
- Penelope Ann Miller as Joyce Dahmer (née Flint), Jeffrey's abusive and mentally unstable mother and Lionel's first wife
  - Savannah Brown as young Joyce
- Dia Nash as Sandra Smith, Glenda's daughter
- Nigel Gibbs as Rev. Jesse Jackson
- Michael Beach as Det. Dennis Murphy, one of the lead detectives on the Dahmer case
- Colby French as Det. Patrick Kennedy, one of the lead detectives on the Dahmer case
- Matthew Alan as Off. Joseph Gabrish, one of the police officers responding to the Konerak Sinthasomphone incident
- Scott Michael Morgan as Off. John Balcerzak, one of the police officers responding to the Konerak Sinthasomphone incident
- David Barrera as Chief Arreola, the Milwaukee chief of police
- Shaun J. Brown as Tracy Edwards, one of Jeffrey's intended victims
- Dyllón Burnside as Ronald Flowers, one of Jeffrey's intended victims
- Cameron Cowperthwaite as Steven Hicks, the hitchhiker who is Jeffrey's first victim
- Vince Hill-Bedford as Steven Tuomi, Jeffrey's second victim
- Rodney Burford as Tony Hughes, the deaf aspiring model who is Jeffrey's twelfth victim
- Kieran Tamondong as Konerak Sinthasomphone, the Laotian boy who is Jeffrey's thirteenth victim
- Karen Malina White as Shirley Hughes, the mother of Tony Hughes
- Khetphet Phagnasay as Southone Sinthasomphone, the father of Konerak Sinthasomphone
- Phet Mahathongdy as Somdy Sinthasomphone, the mother of Konerak Sinthasomphone
- Brayden Maniago as Somsack Sinthasomphone, the older brother of Konerak Sinthasomphone and one of Jeffrey's intended victims
- Scott Paophavihanh as Anouke Sinthasomphone, the older brother of Konerak Sinthasomphone
- Brandon Black as Dean Vaughn, one of Jeffrey's intended victims
- Ken Lerner as Joe Zilber
- DaShawn Barnes as Rita Isbell, sister of Errol Linsey who is Jeffrey's eleventh victim
- Furly Mac as Christopher Scarver, an inmate who murdered Jeffrey and Jesse Anderson
- Jeff Harms as Jesse Anderson, an inmate who was murdered alongside Jeffrey
- Dominic Burgess as John Wayne Gacy, a serial killer and sex offender
- Shane Kerwin as Ed Gein, a serial killer and body snatcher

== Production ==
Evan Peters initially struggled with whether to accept the role of Jeffrey Dahmer, as he had been trying to avoid playing another dark character, but after reading the scripts, however, he found the material compelling and accepted the role. Peters had four months to prepare, during which he studied books, interviews, psychological profiles, confessions, newspaper reports and documentaries about Dahmer.

Peters watched hours of footage of Dahmer and created a 45-minute compilation of recordings of him speaking, which he listened to daily to study his diction. He also studied Dahmer's posture and movements and wore led weights around his hands during rehearsals to reproduce the limited movement of Dahmer's arms when walking.

Peters also contributed to creative decisions during filming, working with the production team on elements including props, wardrobe and makeup. Early makeup tests included heavier makeup and blue contact lenses, but Peters favored a more restrained appearance, believing that an exact physical resemblance to Dahmer was less important than the story being told.

== Soundtrack ==
The score for the season was composed and performed by Nick Cave and Warren Ellis. The soundtrack album was released the same day as the series.

== Episodes ==
No. overall	No. in season	Title	Directed by	Written by	Original release date
1	1	"Bad Meat"	Carl Franklin	Ryan Murphy & Ian Brennan	September 21, 2022
In 1991, Glenda Cleveland, a woman who lives in the Milwaukee apartment next to Jeffrey Dahmer's, has concerns about the noises and smells coming through their shared vent. Dahmer courts his next potential victim, Tracy Edwards, in a bar and takes him home, but Tracy manages to escape and flag down police. Upon visiting Dahmer's apartment, they discover evidence of his previous victims and arrest him. The police summon Dahmer's father Lionel in for questioning, also revealing their further discoveries of Jeffrey's murders. Meanwhile, the other residents of Dahmer's apartment building are evacuated due to safety concerns of the chemicals he used to dismember his victims.
2	2	"Please Don't Go"	Clement Virgo	Ryan Murphy & Ian Brennan	September 21, 2022
Dahmer's life as a pre-teen and adolescent, living with Joyce, a drug-addicted mother and Lionel, an oft-absentee father, is explored. The youngster starts to exhibit great interest in dissecting dead animals, with encouragement from his father. In 1991, an adult Dahmer buys alcohol for 14-year old Konerak Sinthasomphone and brings him to his apartment under the guise of paying the teen for lewd photographs. Dahmer drugs the teen, then experiments by using a power drill to drill into the boy's skull. While Dahmer goes out to buy more alcohol, a woozy Konerak awakes and tries to escape but only makes it to the stairwell where Glenda and her daughter find him. Glenda is concerned about the boy's age, and calls police, but the police take Dahmer's word that the boy is an adult who is Dahmer's boyfriend and simply drank too much. The police escort Konerak back inside, and Dahmer kills him after they leave. A real 1991 recording between Glenda and one of the Milwaukee police officers (discussing Konerak) is played over the ending credits.
3	3	"Doin' a Dahmer"	Clement Virgo	Ryan Murphy & Ian Brennan	September 21, 2022
As a high school senior in 1977–78, Dahmer continues to show interest in animal dissection while also becoming fully aware of his sexual preference for men. After his father and mother divorce, Lionel moves in with his new girlfriend Shari and soon after Joyce moves away with Jeffrey's younger brother David. Jeffrey is left alone in the house to fend for himself. He begins drinking heavily, lifting weights, and fantasizing about having a male companion in the house. He later picks up a hitchhiker named Steven Hicks and invites him to drink beer and work out. When Steven rejects Dahmer's sexual advances, Dahmer hits him with a dumbbell and then strangles him to death. Two police officers stop him when they see his car swerving but let him off with a warning despite seeing several garbage bags in the car's back seat. Dahmer destroys Hicks' bones and scatters the ashes on the family property.
4	4	"The Good Boy Box"	Jennifer Lynch	Ryan Murphy & Ian Brennan	September 21, 2022
Lionel and Shari return to the Dahmer residence after three months, surprised to hear Joyce moved out, and discover Jeff's drinking. Jeff attempts to talk to his father about his homicidal thoughts, but is interrupted by Lionel planning to send him to Ohio State University. At OSU, Dahmer is expelled for attendance issues, causing his father to enlist him in the Army in another attempt to get his son's life on track. In 1981, Dahmer is honorably discharged due to alcohol abuse. Lionel sends him to live with his grandmother, Catherine. At her suggestion, Dahmer goes to the Wisconsin State Fair, where he gets drunk and is arrested for indecent exposure. He takes a job as a phlebotomist, where he steals blood bags and drinks from them. Dahmer later begins going to a gay bathhouse but is soon banned for spiking drinks. In 1987, Dahmer accidentally drugs himself in a hotel room with Steven Tuomi, then wakes up the next morning to discover he had murdered him. He takes the body back to Catherine's house to dismember it in the basement. He seals the man's head in a bag and places it in a lock box Catherine gave him.
5	5	"Blood on Their Hands"	Jennifer Lynch	Ian Brennan	September 21, 2022
In 1987, Dahmer takes a job at a chocolate factory. He begins to seek out victims with the conscious intention of killing, beginning a cycle of bringing men to Catherine's house, drugging them, strangling them to death, and dismembering them in the cellar. The smells coming from the cellar prompt a confrontation with Catherine and Lionel. When Dahmer tells them that it is caused by his taxidermy hobby, Lionel excoriates him for not cleaning up after it adequately, leading Dahmer to reassure them that he will cease that activity. Dahmer invites Ronald Flowers Jr., a man struggling with his car, to Catherine's house in an attempt to drug and kill him. After Flowers falls unconscious in her living room, Catherine finds him and forces Jeffrey to put him on a bus. After Flowers reports this to the police, they question Dahmer and Catherine but find no evidence to arrest him. Dahmer is later arrested after another victim, Somsack Sinthasomphone, Konerak's older brother, escapes from him. Dahmer is found guilty of sexual assault and sent to prison. Lionel writes a letter to the judge, asking him to put Jeffrey in a treatment program for alcohol abuse, but the letter is ignored and he is released from custody a year later.
6	6	"Silenced"	Paris Barclay	David McMillan & Janet Mock	September 21, 2022
In 1991, Tony Hughes makes a life for himself despite his deafness. He lands a job in Madison, but returns to spend time with his family in Milwaukee on weekends. One weekend evening, he dances at a bar and catches Dahmer's eye. Dahmer thinks about spiking Tony's drink at the bar, but reconsiders. Tony and Dahmer say they like each other, and they meet again the following weekend. Dahmer invites Tony into his apartment, where he again considers drugging him but resists. The two sleep together, and the following morning Tony says he has to leave for work. Dahmer gets a hammer, but lets Tony go. However, when Tony returns for his keys, Dahmer kills him with the hammer. Tony's mother, Shirley contacts police when her son has not checked in and missed work. They seemingly do nothing, so she posts "Missing Person" signs all over Milwaukee. As she does, she notices many other such signs near the gay bars. After killing Tony, Dahmer prepares a piece of meat, likely human flesh, cooks it and eats it.
7	7	"Cassandra"	Jennifer Lynch	Ian Brennan & Janet Mock & David McMillan	September 21, 2022
After Dahmer is arrested and news of his victims becomes public, there is widespread outrage with police among the victims' families, and particularly with Glenda. She is most upset over the murder of Konerak (whom she tried to help before police returned him to Dahmer's apartment) and has been severely traumatized by listening to the noises (screams and power tools) coming from Dahmer's apartment. Dahmer's building is considered hazardous due to the chemicals he used to dissolve body parts. The tenants are evacuated, forcing Glenda to get a motel room. Jesse Jackson takes an interest in the case due to the large number of black and brown victims, and he meets with Glenda, who tells him of the horrors she witnessed, including a time when an angry Dahmer served her a sandwich made with possible human remains. Disgusted, Jackson vows to hold the Milwaukee Police accountable for their oversights.
8	8	"Lionel"	Gregg Araki	Ian Brennan & David McMillan	September 21, 2022
Lionel is horrified by Dahmer and what he has done. With his wife, he deals with his demons, alternately blaming himself and Joyce. Jesse continues working on behalf of the victims' families. The two officers who were suspended over Konerak's case are reinstated. Joyce attempts to persuade some of the victims' family to persuade the judge that Jeffrey should be sent to psycriatic hospital but fails. Dahmer goes to trial after his insanity plea is denied. After he is sentenced to 15 life terms and victim statements are heard, Dahmer is given a chance to speak. He says he knows he is mentally ill and apologizes to the families. Joyce attempts suicide but is stopped by David. Lionel finds writing a book about being Jeffrey's father to be therapeutic.
9	9	"The Bogeyman"	Jennifer Lynch	Ian Brennan & David McMillan & Reilly Smith	September 21, 2022
Family members of Dahmer's victims deal with grief, fear, sleeplessness and nightmares. After convincing Shirley to sue Lionel over the profits of his book, lawyer Joe Zilber brings a $14 million lawsuit against the City of Milwaukee on behalf of the victims' families. Lionel learns that any profits from his book will be paid to victims' families. In prison, Dahmer begins receiving "fan mail", with several people sending him money in exchange for autographed items. He obliges and sends them back. Joe, angered that people plan to profit by selling items removed from Dahmer's home, offers the dealers double their asking price. He then gives every victim's family a share of what he paid, saying all the items will be destroyed.
10	10	"God of Forgiveness, God of Vengeance"	Paris Barclay	Ian Brennan & David McMillan & Reilly Smith & Todd Kubrak	September 21, 2022
After attending a church service in prison, Dahmer asks to be baptized, near the same time as John Wayne Gacy's execution. The $14 million lawsuit is settled out of court for less than $900,000. An inmate named Christopher Scarver kills Dahmer and another inmate, Jesse Anderson, with a metal bar, saying that God told him to commit the murder. Per Dahmer's wishes, his body is cremated, and no funeral is held, but his brain is kept for scientific research. Lionel insists that the brain also be destroyed, while Joyce wants it to be studied. Lionel explains that he and the victims' families just want closure, which would be made more difficult by retaining the brain. A judge sides with Lionel, and the brain is cremated. As Milwaukee residents watch, the Oxford Apartments are destroyed. Glenda meets with a city official to advocate for the site of the apartments to be turned into a memorial for the victims, but is warned that it will be a lengthy process. The photos and names of Dahmer's victims are displayed in the closing titles, which also state that no memorial has yet been built.

== Reception ==
=== Audience viewership ===
The season rose to the number one spot on Netflix in the first week of its release. In the second week of its release, Netflix announced that Dahmer was its ninth most popular English-language TV show of all time, with 56 million households having viewed all 10 episodes. The season remained number-one for weeks and became Netflix's second most-viewed English Netflix season of all time, and the fourth highest across any language with 701.37 million hours viewed in 21 days. The season amassed more than 865 million hours viewed in the first 28 days of its release. In 60 days it became the third Netflix season to pass 1 billion views.

Dahmer debuted at number-one on the Nielsen Top 10 streaming chart by garnering more than 3.6 billion minutes of viewing for the week of September 19–25, placing it 10th on the all-time list for single-week viewership. The following week, it jumped to No. 7 on the all-time list with 4.4 billion minutes viewed. The season topped Nielsen's streaming chart for the third consecutive week with 2.3 billion viewing minutes.

Jermey Dick of MovieWeb stated that on "October 3rd through the 9th the views of the Dahmer season made up to 205 million hours streamed" into watching the show for that period, overall making it up to "701 million hours watched globally".

=== Critical response ===
The review aggregator website Rotten Tomatoes reported a 57% approval rating with an average rating of 6.3/10, based on 30 critic reviews. The website's critics consensus says: "While Monster is seemingly self-aware of the peril in glorifying Jeffrey Dahmer, creator Ryan Murphy's salacious style nevertheless tilts this horror story into the realm of queasy exploitation." Metacritic, which uses a weighted average, assigned a score of 46 out of 100 based on 9 critics, indicating "mixed or average" reviews.

Kayla Cobb at Decider said the show "isn't just well directed, written, and acted. It's rewriting what a crime drama can look like if we stop glorifying murderers and start focusing more on systematic failures." Caroline Framke of Variety argues that the show "simply can't rise to its own ambition of explaining both the man and the societal inequities his crimes exploited without becoming exploitative in and of itself." Malik Peay of the Los Angeles Times stated that those critical of the show felt that the season was emblematic of the "entertainment industry's commercialization of tragedy". Dan Fienberg of The Hollywood Reporter praises episode 6 ("Silenced") as "easily the best episode of the series, an uncomfortably sweet and sad hour of TV that probably should have been the template for the entire show [and]...in placing a Black, deaf, gay character at the center of the narrative, the series is giving voice to somebody whose voice has too frequently been excluded from gawking serial killer portraits."

=== Accolades ===
Accolades received by Dahmer – Monster: The Jeffrey Dahmer Story
Award	Date of ceremony	Category	Recipient(s)	Result	Ref.
Hollywood Music in Media Awards	November 16, 2022	Best Music Supervision – Television	Amanda Krieg Thomas	Nominated	
People's Choice Awards	December 6, 2022	The Bingeworthy Show of 2022	Dahmer – Monster: The Jeffrey Dahmer Story	Won	
Golden Globe Awards	January 10, 2023	Best Limited or Anthology Series or Television Film	Dahmer – Monster: The Jeffrey Dahmer Story	Nominated	
Golden Globe Awards	January 10, 2023	Best Actor – Limited Series, Anthology Series or Television Motion Picture	Evan Peters	Won	
Golden Globe Awards	January 10, 2023	Best Supporting Actress – Television Limited Series/Motion Picture	Niecy Nash	Nominated	
Golden Globe Awards	January 10, 2023	Best Supporting Actor – Television Limited Series/Motion Picture	Richard Jenkins	Nominated	
Critics' Choice Television Awards	January 15, 2023	Best Supporting Actress in a Limited Series or Movie Made for Television	Niecy Nash	Won	
Producers Guild of America Awards	February 25, 2023	Outstanding Producer of Limited or Anthology Series Television	Ryan Murphy, Ian Brennan, Alexis Martin Woodall, Eric Kovtun, Evan Peters, Janet Mock, Scott Robertson, Sara Stelwagen, Tanase Popa, David McMillan, Todd Nenninger, Lou Eyrich, Todd Kubrak, Reilly Smith, Regis Kimble, Richard Jenkins, and Mathew Hart	Nominated	
NAACP Image Awards	February 25, 2023	Outstanding Actress in a Television Movie, Mini-Series or Dramatic Special	Niecy Nash	Won	
Screen Actors Guild Awards	February 26, 2023	Outstanding Performance by a Male Actor in a Miniseries or Television Movie	Evan Peters	Nominated	
Screen Actors Guild Awards	February 26, 2023	Outstanding Performance by a Female Actor in a Miniseries or Television Movie	Niecy Nash	Nominated	
Satellite Awards	March 3, 2023	Best Miniseries or Limited Series	Dahmer – Monster: The Jeffrey Dahmer Story	Nominated	
Satellite Awards	March 3, 2023	Best Actor in a Miniseries, Limited Series, or Motion Picture Made for Television	Evan Peters	Won	
Satellite Awards	March 3, 2023	Best Actor in a Supporting Role in a Series, Miniseries, Limited Series, or Motion Picture Made for Television	Richard Jenkins	Nominated	
Cinema Audio Society Awards	March 4, 2023	Outstanding Achievement in Sound Mixing for Television Movie or Limited Series	Amanda Beggs, Laura Wiest, Joe Barnett, Jamie Hardt, Judah Getz and Jacob McNaughton (for episode "Lionel")	Nominated	
Critics' Choice Super Awards	March 16, 2023	Best Horror Series	Dahmer – Monster: The Jeffrey Dahmer Story	Nominated	
Critics' Choice Super Awards	March 16, 2023	Best Actor in a Horror Series, Limited Series or Made-for-TV Movie	Evan Peters	Won	
Critics' Choice Super Awards	March 16, 2023	Best Actress in a Horror Series, Limited Series or Made-for-TV Movie	Niecy Nash	Nominated	
British Academy Television Awards	May 14, 2023	Best International Programme	Ryan Murphy, Ian Brennan, Alexis Martin Woodall, David McMillan, Reilly Smith, Carl Franklin	Won	
Primetime Creative Arts Emmy Awards	January 6–7, 2024	Outstanding Casting for a Limited or Anthology Series or Movie	Robert J. Ulrich, Eric Dawson, Carol Kritzer	Nominated	
Primetime Creative Arts Emmy Awards	January 6–7, 2024	Outstanding Period and/or Character Hairstyling	Shay Sanford-Fong, Maggie Hayes Jackson, Michael S. Ward, Havanna Pratt (for "Lionel")	Nominated	
Primetime Creative Arts Emmy Awards	January 6–7, 2024	Outstanding Period and/or Character Makeup (Non-Prosthetic)	Gigi Williams, Michelle Audrina Kim (for "Bad Meat")	Nominated	
Primetime Creative Arts Emmy Awards	January 6–7, 2024	Outstanding Period Costumes for a Limited or Anthology Series or Movie	Rudy Mance, Monica Chamberlain, Desmond Smith, Suzy Freeman (for "Please Don't Go")	Nominated	
Primetime Creative Arts Emmy Awards	January 6–7, 2024	Outstanding Picture Editing for a Limited or Anthology Series or Movie	Stephanie Filo (for "The Good Boy Box")	Nominated	
Primetime Creative Arts Emmy Awards	January 6–7, 2024	Outstanding Sound Editing for a Limited or Anthology Series, Movie or Special	Gary Megregian, Borja Sau, Bruce Tanis, David Klotz, Sam Munoz, Noel Vought (for "God Of Forgiveness, God Of Vengeance")	Nominated	
Primetime Creative Arts Emmy Awards	January 6–7, 2024	Outstanding Sound Mixing for a Limited or Anthology Series or Movie	Laura Wiest, Jamie Hardt, Joe Barnett, Amanda Beggs (for "Lionel")	Nominated	
Astra TV Awards	January 8, 2024	Best Streaming Limited or Anthology Series	Dahmer – Monster: The Jeffrey Dahmer Story	Nominated	
Astra TV Awards	January 8, 2024	Best Actor in a Streaming Limited or Anthology Series or Movie	Evan Peters	Won	
Astra TV Awards	January 8, 2024	Best Supporting Actor in a Streaming Limited or Anthology Series or Movie	Kieran Tamondong	Nominated	
Astra TV Awards	January 8, 2024	Best Supporting Actor in a Streaming Limited or Anthology Series or Movie	Richard Jenkins	Nominated	
Astra TV Awards	January 8, 2024	Best Supporting Actress in a Streaming Limited or Anthology Series or Movie	Niecy Nash	Won	
Astra TV Awards	January 8, 2024	Best Directing in a Streaming Limited or Anthology Series or Movie	Paris Barclay (for "God of Forgiveness, God of Vengeance")	Nominated	
Astra Creative Arts TV Awards	January 8, 2024	Best Casting in a Limited Series or TV Movie	Dahmer – Monster: The Jeffrey Dahmer Story	Nominated	
Primetime Emmy Awards	January 15, 2024	Outstanding Limited or Anthology Series	Ryan Murphy, Ian Brennan, Alexis Martin Woodall, Eric Kovtun, Evan Peters, Janet Mock, Scott Robertson, Sara Stelwagen, Tanase Popa, David McMillan, Todd Nenninger, Lou Eyrich, Todd Kubrak, Reilly Smith, Regis Kimble, Richard Jenkins, and Mathew Hart	Nominated	
Primetime Emmy Awards	January 15, 2024	Outstanding Lead Actor in a Limited or Anthology Series or Movie	Evan Peters	Nominated	
Primetime Emmy Awards	January 15, 2024	Outstanding Supporting Actor in a Limited or Anthology Series or Movie	Richard Jenkins	Nominated	
Primetime Emmy Awards	January 15, 2024	Outstanding Supporting Actress in a Limited or Anthology Series or Movie	Niecy Nash	Won	
Primetime Emmy Awards	January 15, 2024	Outstanding Directing for a Limited or Anthology Series or Movie	Carl Franklin (for "Bad Meat")	Nominated	
Primetime Emmy Awards	January 15, 2024	Outstanding Directing for a Limited or Anthology Series or Movie	Paris Barclay (for "Silenced")	Nominated	

=== Controversies ===
On September 23, 2022, Netflix removed the season's "LGBTQ" tag after backlash on social media.

The season also received backlash from the families of Dahmer's victims, accusing Netflix of profiting off their traumatic experiences and "retraumatizing [the families] all over again". Eric Perry, a relative of victim Errol Lindsey, stated "I want people to understand this is not just a story or historical fact, these are real people's lives. [Lindsey] was someone's son, someone's brother, someone's friend that was ripped from [our] lives".

Production assistant Kim Alsup alleged mistreatment while on set. She stated she was one of two Black crew members below the line on Dahmer, adding that "I was always being called someone else's name, the only other Black girl who looked nothing like me, and I learned the names for 300 background extras". Alsup also alleged an "exhausting" and "unsupportive environment", stating there were no therapists on set. A spokesperson for Netflix countered this allegation, stating that everyone on set had access to free health and wellness sources, including access to a therapist.

Shirley Hughes, the mother of Tony Hughes, whose story is told in the sixth episode, spoke out against the season's depiction of events. Hughes told The Guardian "It didn't happen like that", and expressed frustration over use of real names in the show.

== Future ==
Having initially ordered the program in 2020 as a limited series, Netflix announced on November 7, 2022, that it had renewed Monster as an anthology series, with two further editions based on the lives of "other monstrous figures" to be announced.

On May 1, 2023, Netflix announced the second season of the series titled Monsters: The Lyle and Erik Menendez Story (2024), which is based on the murder case of the Menendez brothers. On June 29, 2023, Deadline Hollywood reported that Nicholas Alexander Chavez and Cooper Koch were cast as Lyle and Erik Menendez respectively. Monsters: The Lyle and Erik Menendez Story was released on September 19, 2024.
