= Roy Ratcliff =

American Christian minister and author (born 1948)

Personal life
- Born: Roy G. Ratcliff; 1947 (age 78–79) Matador, Texas, U.S.
- Spouse: Susan
- Children: 2

Religious life
- Religion: Christianity

Roy G. Ratcliff (born 1947) is an American Christian minister and author. He is best known for ministering to serial killer Jeffrey Dahmer at the Columbia Correctional Institution in Portage, Wisconsin.

== Personal life ==
Ratcliff grew up primarily in California. After graduating from high school in Wichita, Kansas, he graduated from Oklahoma Christian University in 1970. He and his wife Susan have two grown children. He currently resides in Cottage Grove, Wisconsin.

== Ministering to Jeffrey Dahmer ==
Ratcliff first visited Dahmer in prison in April 1994 and baptized him as a Christian on May 10 in a whirlpool originally meant to treat injured prisoners. After this, Ratcliff visited Dahmer weekly, providing him with spiritual counseling and leading him in Bible study sessions. Six months later, Dahmer was murdered on the 28th of November 1994 by a fellow prisoner Christopher Scarver.

Ratcliff conducted his funeral service on December 2, 1994, and eulogized him:

Jeff confessed to me his great remorse for his crimes. He wished he could do something for the families of his victims to make it right, but there was nothing he could do. He turned to God because there was no one else to turn to, but he showed great courage in daring to ask the question, ‘Is heaven for me too?’ I think many people are resentful of him for asking that question. But he dared to ask, and he dared to believe the answer.

Ratcliff later wrote a book about his experiences titled Dark Journey, Deep Grace: Jeffrey Dahmer's Story of Faith (2006).

Since ministering to Dahmer, Ratcliff has discipled prisoners in several Wisconsin prisons.

== Bibliography ==
- Ratcliff, Roy; Adams, Lindy (2006). Dark Journey, Deep Grace: Jeffrey Dahmer's Story of Faith, Abilene, Texas: Leafwood Publishers. ISBN 978-0-97677-902-5.
