= Spectre Studios =

Toy company

Spectre Studios is a Colorado toy company headed by David Johnson.

Johnson gained controversy in 2002 for making a line of serial killer action figures that were featured on the Nation Enquirer, including an action figure of Jeffrey Dahmer.

The "Serial Killer" line included Jeffrey Dahmer, Ted Bundy, Ed Gein, Pogo the Clown, Lizzie Borden, and Charles Manson, and O. J. Simpson.

The company also made a line of winged women with the characters Gabrielle, Dorcha, Salleene, and Frist.

David Johnson retired Spectre Studios in 2010 but has since come out of retirement with a new rebooted line of serial killers and website.
