= Balcerzak =

Balcerzak (Polish pronunciation: [balˈtsɛʐak]) is a surname of Polish-language origin. Notable people with the surname include:

- John Balcerzak, American police officer
- Patrycja Balcerzak (born 1994), Polish footballer
- Piotr Balcerzak (born 1975), Polish sprinter
