= Fred Berlin =

American psychiatrist and sexologist

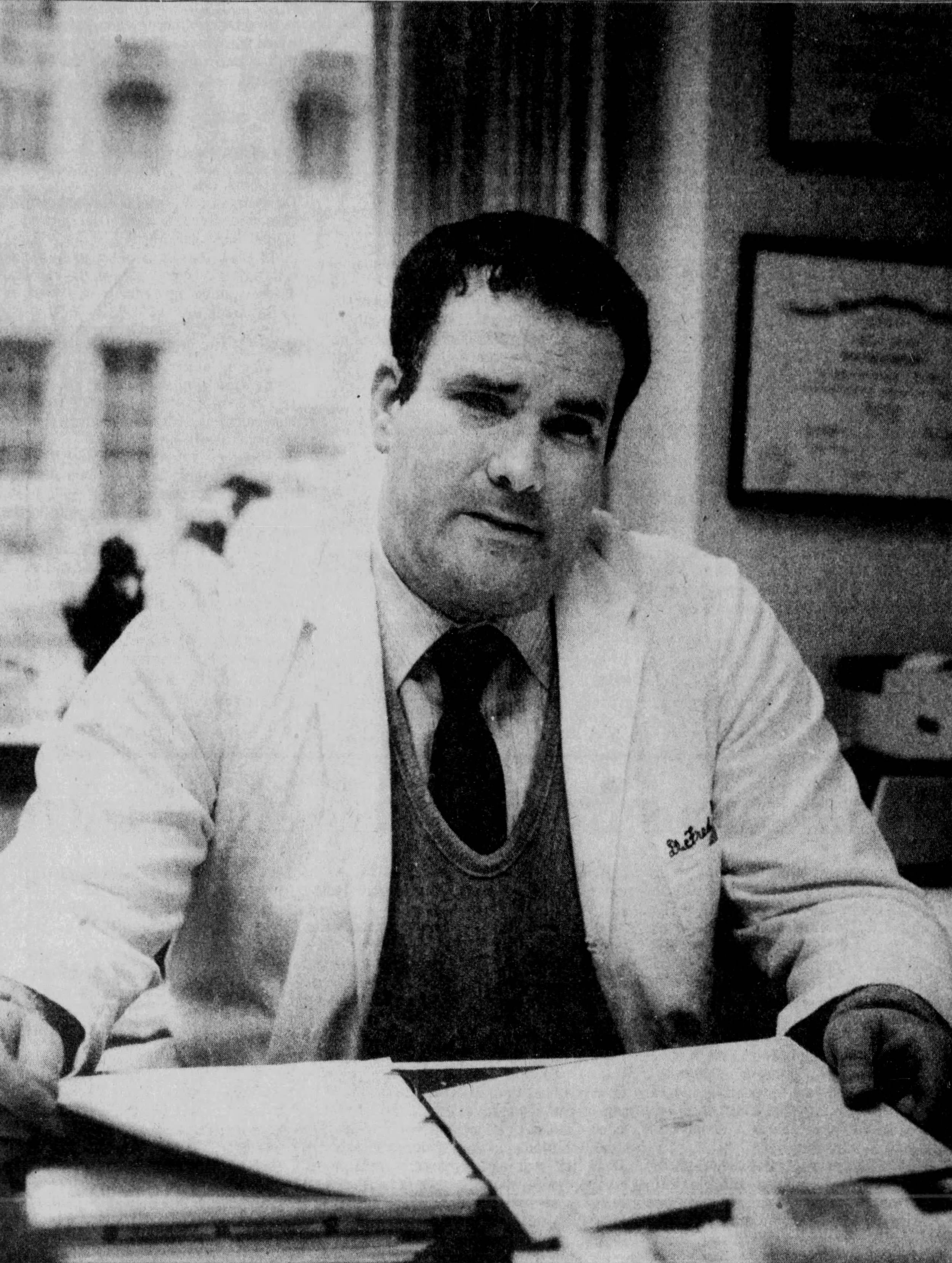
- Berlin in 1984
- Born: Frederick Saul Berlin
- Education: University of Pittsburgh; Fordham University; Dalhousie University (PhD, MD)
- Occupations: Psychiatrist, sexologist
- Scientific career
- Fields: Psychiatry, sexology

Frederick "Fred" Saul Berlin is an American psychiatrist and sexologist specializing in sex offenses.

== Life and career ==
Berlin studied psychology, earning a bachelor's degree from the University of Pittsburgh in 1964, a master's degree from Fordham University in 1966, and a Ph.D. from Dalhousie University in 1972. He earned a Doctor of Medicine degree from Dalhousie in 1974. Following a clerkship at Victoria General Hospital in Halifax, Nova Scotia, he was an intern at McGill University School of Medicine, Jewish General Hospital, and Children's Hospital in Montreal. He completed a psychiatric residency at Johns Hopkins Hospital in Baltimore and served as an exchange resident at Maudsley Hospital in London, England. After serving as chief resident at Johns Hopkins, he was appointed to its Department of Psychiatry and Behavioral Sciences as assistant professor in 1978 and promoted to associate professor in 1986. He has been an attending physician there since 1978 and served as founder and director of its Sexual Disorders Clinic from 1980 to 1992. In 1992 he founded the National Institute for the Study, Prevention and Treatment of Sexual Trauma and serves as its director.

Berlin served on the Subcommittee on the Paraphilias, American Psychiatric Association committee on the third revision of the Diagnostic and Statistical Manual of Mental Disorders (DSM-III-R) from 1984 to 1989. He received a Presidential Citation from the City of Baltimore in 1996 and was named a distinguished fellow of the American Psychiatric Association in 2003. In 2009 he was invited to testify before the Senate Subcommittee on National Security and Foreign Affairs on the subject of sexually disordered sexual offenders including those with pedophilia.

Memberships include the American Association for the Advancement of Science, the American Medical Association, the American Professional Society on the Abuse of Children, the American Psychiatric Association, and the Association for the Treatment of Sexual Abusers.

He has appeared as an expert witness in trials including the murder trial of Mark Dean Schwab and Jeffrey Dahmer. He has discussed the merits of chemical castration for sex offenders.

== Selected publications ==
- Berlin FS (1972). The use of waking and hypnotic suggestions to change behavior. Dissertation.
- Berlin FS, Meinecke CF (1981). Treatment of sex offenders with antiandrogenic medication: conceptualization, review of treatment modalities, and preliminary findings. Am J Psychiatry 1981; 138:601-607.
- Berlin FS (1989). Special considerations in the psychiatric evaluation of sexual offenders against minors. In Rosner R, Schwartz HI (eds.). Juvenile psychiatry and the law. Plenum Press, ISBN 978-0-306-42958-3
- Berlin FS, Hunt WP, Malin HM, Dyer A, Lehne GK, Dean S (1991). A Five-Year Plus Follow-up Survey of Criminal Recidivism Within a Treated Cohort of 406 Pedophiles, 111 Exhibitionists and 109 Sexual Aggressives: Issues and Outcome. American Journal of Forensic Psychiatry, 12, 3, pp. 5–28, 1991.
- Berlin FS, Malin HM, Dean S (1989). Effects of statutes requiring psychiatrists to report suspected sexual abuse of children. Am J Psychiatry 1991; 148:449-453.
- Berlin FS (1996). Sexual deviation [review]. The Journal of Nervous and Mental Disease, 186, No. 4, pp 255–256, 4/98. Review of Rosen I (ed). Sexual Deviation, Third Edition, Oxford University Press, ISBN 978-0-19-262516-8
- Fagan PJ, Wise TN, Schmidt CW, Berlin FS (2002). Special Communication of Pedophilia. Journal of the American Medical Association, 288, 19, pp. 2458–2465, November, 2002.
- Saleh F, Berlin FS (2003). Sex Hormones, Neurotransmitters and Psychopharmalogical Treatments in Men with Paraphilic Disorders. Journal of Child Sex Abuse, Vol. 12, No. 3/4. pp. 233–253, 2003. Also published simultaneously in Identifying and Treating Sex Offenders: Current approaches, Research, and Techniques, (ed. Robert Geffner, et al.). The Haworth Maltreatment & Trauma Press, New York, pp. 233–253, 2003.
- Schwartz MF, Berlin FS (2008). Sexually Compulsive Behavior, An Issue of Psychiatric Clinics: Volumes 31–34. Saunders, ISBN 978-1-4160-6389-6
