= Jesse Anderson =

American murderer (1957–1994)

- Born: Jesse Michael Anderson; May 3, 1957; Alton, Illinois, U.S.
- Died: November 30, 1994 (aged 37); UW Health University Hospital, Madison, Wisconsin, U.S.
- Cause of death: Homicide (severe head trauma)
- Occupation: Landscaping contractor
- Spouses: Debra Ann Eickert (m. 1981; div. 1985); Barbara E. Lynch (m. 1985; died 1992)
- Children: 3
- Conviction: First degree intentional homicide
- Penalty: Life imprisonment (minimum of 60 years)

Details
- Victims: Barbara Anderson, 33
- Date: April 21, 1992
- Location: Milwaukee, Wisconsin
- Weapon: Knife
- Date apprehended: April 29, 1992

Jesse Michael Anderson (May 3, 1957 – November 30, 1994) was an American criminal. Anderson was convicted of the murder of his wife, Barbara Anderson, and in attempting to escape blame for the murder, he wounded himself and claimed to police that the couple had been attacked by two black men.

While incarcerated at Columbia Correctional Institution in Wisconsin, Anderson was murdered in 1994 by fellow inmate and convicted murderer Christopher Scarver. Jeffrey Dahmer, a convicted serial killer and cannibal, was fatally attacked by Scarver after a confrontation when the three were on a work detail together.

== Early life ==
Anderson was raised in Alton, Illinois. When he was a teenager, his father died of a heart attack and his mother remarried. He attended Alton High School and graduated in 1975.

In 1980, Anderson married Debra Ann Eickert. They divorced in 1984. That year, Anderson also graduated with a degree in Business Administration from Elmhurst College. On March 30, 1985, he married Barbara E. Lynch in Chicago, Illinois.

The Andersons later lived in Cedarburg, Wisconsin, with their three young children. Anderson was treasurer of the Lions Club and did volunteer work at the Divine Word Catholic Church.

== Murder of Barbara Anderson ==
On April 21, 1992, the Anderson couple went to a movie and dinner at a TGI Fridays outside the Northridge Mall in northwest Milwaukee.

After dinner, Anderson stabbed Barbara five times in the face and head, and then stabbed himself four times in the chest. Most of his wounds were superficial. Barbara went into a coma and died from her wounds two days later.

Anderson claimed that two black men had attacked him and his wife. He gave police a Los Angeles Clippers basketball cap he said he had knocked off the head of one of the assailants. When details of the crime were made public, a university student told police Anderson had purchased the hat from him a few days earlier. Police investigation found that, according to employees at a military surplus store, the red-handled fishing knife that was used to kill Barbara was sold to Anderson a few weeks earlier. Police stated that the store was the only one in Milwaukee that sold that type of knife.

On April 29, Anderson was charged with murder. On August 13, he was convicted in a jury trial. He was sentenced to life in prison, with the possibility of parole after 60 years.

== Death ==
On the morning of November 28, 1994 while imprisoned at Columbia Correctional Institution, Anderson and serial killer Jeffrey Dahmer were left unattended while cleaning a restroom at the prison gymnasium with fellow inmate Christopher Scarver. After a confrontation with Dahmer and Anderson on the cleaning detail, Scarver retrieved a steel bar from the weight room, followed Dahmer to the locker room, and fatally struck him on the head. He tracked down Anderson and bludgeoned him as well. Dahmer was declared dead about one hour after the attack. Anderson died two days later after doctors at the University of Wisconsin Hospital in Madison removed him from life support.

Scarver said later that he was "disgusted" by a newspaper report detailing Dahmer's crimes against black people. Scarver had pleaded an insanity defense at his own 1992 trial. When asked by a psychiatrist whether Scarver thought his sentence was just, he replied, "Nothing white people do to blacks is just". In a 2015 blog post, Scarver disputed some of these statements.
