= Jeffrey Dahmer =

American serial killer (1960–1994)

- 1991 mugshot of Dahmer
- Born: Jeffrey Lionel Dahmer; May 21, 1960; Milwaukee, Wisconsin, U.S.
- Died: November 28, 1994 (aged 34); Portage, Wisconsin, U.S.
- Other names: The Milwaukee Cannibal; The Milwaukee Monster
- Convictions: First-degree murder (16 counts) (Note: Fifteen counts of first-degree intentional homicide in Wisconsin and one count of aggravated murder in Ohio. He was not convicted for the murder of Steven Tuomi, as he had no memory of actually committing the murder, for which no physical evidence of the crime existed.); Disorderly conduct (2 counts); Second-degree sexual assault and enticing a child for immoral purposes (Note: These convictions were served concurrently in relation to Dahmer's September 1988 arrest for drugging and sexually fondling a 13-year-old boy.)
- Penalty: Life imprisonment without the possibility of parole (×16; total of 941 years imprisonment)

Details
- Victims: 17
- Span of crimes: 1978–1991
- Country: United States
- States: Ohio; Wisconsin
- Date apprehended: July 22, 1991

Jeffrey Lionel Dahmer (/ˈdɑː.mər/; May 21, 1960 – November 28, 1994), also known as the Milwaukee Cannibal or the Milwaukee Monster, was an American serial killer and sex offender who killed and dismembered seventeen men and boys between 1978 and 1991.

Dahmer committed his first murder in Ohio in 1978; he did not resume killing until 1987. The modus operandi for many of his later crimes involved him luring a victim to his Wisconsin apartment where they would be drugged, sexually assaulted, and murdered. Many of his later murders involved necrophilia, cannibalism, and the permanent preservation of body parts—typically all or part of the skeleton.

Dahmer was arrested in 1991 after an intended victim escaped from his apartment. Although diagnosed with borderline personality disorder (BPD), schizotypal personality disorder (StPD), and a psychotic disorder, he was declared legally sane at his trial. He was convicted of 16 counts of murder (15 in Wisconsin and one in Ohio) and sentenced to 16 terms of life imprisonment without parole in 1992.

On November 28, 1994, Dahmer was beaten to death by Christopher Scarver, a fellow inmate at the Columbia Correctional Institution in Portage, Wisconsin.

== Early life ==
=== Childhood ===
Jeffrey Lionel Dahmer was born on May 21, 1960, in Milwaukee, Wisconsin, the first of two sons to Lionel Herbert Dahmer, a Marquette University chemistry graduate school student and later a research chemist, and Joyce Annette Dahmer (née Flint), a teletype machine instructor. Lionel was of German and Welsh ancestry, and Joyce was of Norwegian and Irish ancestry.

Some sources report Dahmer was deprived of attention as an infant. Other sources, however, suggest that Dahmer was generally doted upon as an infant and toddler by both parents, although his mother was known to be tense, greedy for both attention and pity, and argumentative with her husband and their neighbors.

As Dahmer entered first grade, Lionel's studies kept him away from home much of the time. When he was home, his wife—a hypochondriac who suffered from depression—demanded constant attention and spent an increasing amount of time in bed. On one occasion, she attempted suicide using Equanil. Neither parent devoted much time to their son, who later recollected that, from an early age, he felt "unsure of the solidity of the family", recalling extreme tension and numerous arguments between his parents during his early years.

Dahmer had been an "energetic and happy child" but became notably subdued after undergoing double hernia surgery shortly before his fourth birthday. At elementary school, Dahmer was regarded as quiet and timid. One teacher recollected she detected early signs of abandonment due to his father's absence and mother's illnesses, the symptoms of which increased when she became pregnant with her second child. In elementary school, Dahmer had a small number of friends.

In October 1966, the family moved to Doylestown, Ohio. When Joyce gave birth in December, Dahmer was allowed to choose the name of his new baby brother; he chose the name David. The same year, Lionel earned his PhD in chemistry from Iowa State University and started work as an analytical chemist in nearby Akron.

From an early age, Dahmer manifested an interest in dead animals. His fascination with dead animals may have begun when, at the age of four, he saw his father removing animal bones from beneath the family home. According to Lionel, Dahmer was "oddly thrilled" by the sound the bones made, and became preoccupied with animal bones, which he initially called his "fiddlesticks". He occasionally searched beneath and around the family home for additional bones, and explored the bodies of live animals to discover where their bones were located.

In May 1968, the family moved to Bath Township, Summit County, Ohio. (Note: Several media accounts published following Dahmer's arrest reference claims purportedly made by Dahmer's father to a parole officer in April 1990 that his older son had been molested by a neighbor at age eight. Lionel would later deny having made such claims, and Dahmer would deny having been subjected to any form of sexual abuse.) This address was their third in two years, and the Dahmers' sixth address since marriage. (Note: The family had relocated to a rented property in Barberton, Ohio, prior to moving to Bath Township.) The home stood in one and a half acres of woodland, with a small hut a short walk from the house where Dahmer began collecting large insects and the skeletons of small animals, such as chipmunks and squirrels. Some of these remains were preserved in jars of formaldehyde and stored within the hut.

Two years later, during a chicken dinner, Dahmer asked Lionel what would happen if the chicken bones were placed in bleach. Lionel, pleased by what he believed to be his son's scientific curiosity, demonstrated how to safely bleach and preserve animal bones. Dahmer incorporated these preserving techniques into his bone collecting. He also began collecting dead animals—including roadkill—which he would dissect and bury beside the hut, with the skulls occasionally placed atop makeshift crosses.

According to one friend, Dahmer explained that he was curious as to how animals "fit together". In one instance in 1975, Dahmer decapitated the carcass of a dog before nailing the body to a tree and impaling the skull upon a stick in the woodland behind his house. As a "prank", he later invited a friend to view the display, claiming he had discovered the remains by chance. The same year Lionel taught his son how to preserve animal bones, Joyce began increasing her daily consumption of Equanil, laxatives and sleeping pills, further increasing her emotional distance from her husband and children.

=== Adolescence and high school ===
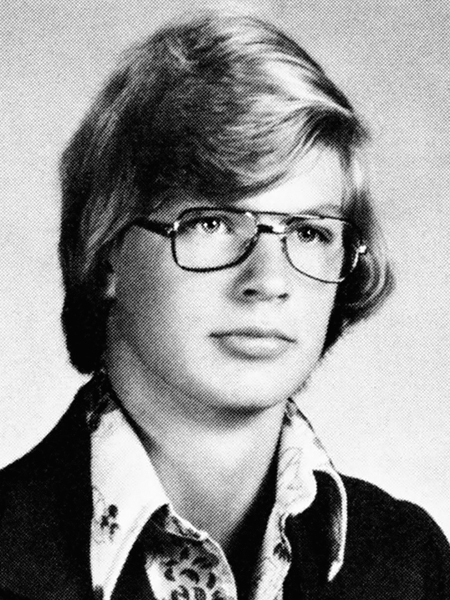
Dahmer, pictured in the 1978 Revere High School yearbook, Reverie

From his freshman year at Revere High School, Dahmer was seen as an outcast. (Note: In a 2002 paper published in the Journal of Forensic Sciences, it has been suggested that Dahmer may have had Asperger syndrome.) By age 14, he had begun drinking beer and hard alcohol in the daylight hours, frequently concealing his liquor inside the jacket he wore to school. When a classmate asked why he was drinking whisky in a morning history class, Dahmer shrugged and said the alcohol was "my medicine". Although largely uncommunicative, in his freshman year Dahmer was seen by staff as polite and highly intelligent, but earned only average grades. He was a competitive tennis player and played briefly in the high school band.

When he reached puberty, Dahmer discovered he was gay; he did not tell his parents. In his early teens, he had a brief relationship with another teenage boy, although they never engaged in any form of sexual intercourse. By Dahmer's admission, he began fantasizing about dominating and controlling a completely submissive male partner in his early to mid-teens, and his masturbatory fantasies gradually evolved to his focusing on chests and torsos. These fantasies gradually became intertwined with dissection.

When he was about 16, Dahmer conceived a fantasy of rendering unconscious a particular male jogger he found attractive, and then making sexual use of his body. On one occasion, Dahmer concealed himself in bushes with a baseball bat to lie in wait for this man. However, the jogger did not pass by on that particular day. Dahmer later admitted this was his first attempt to attack and render an individual submissive to him.

Dahmer was known to his high school peers as a class clown who often staged pranks, which became known as "Doing a Dahmer"; these included bleating and simulating epileptic seizures or cerebral palsy at school and local stores. Occasionally, Dahmer would perform these antics for money to purchase alcohol. On one occasion in 1977, during a school trip to Washington, D.C., Dahmer bet his classmates he could obtain a personal tour of the White House. Although his classmates were skeptical, Dahmer did call the White House and successfully persuaded dignitaries to allow his class an impromptu tour, including the office of Vice President Walter Mondale.

By 1977, Dahmer's grades had declined. His parents hired a private tutor, with limited success. The same year, in an attempt to save their marriage, his parents attended counseling sessions. They continued to quarrel frequently. When Lionel discovered Joyce had engaged in a brief affair in September 1977, they decided to divorce, telling their sons they wished to do so amicably. The process of their divorce soon became increasingly bitter and acrimonious, and Lionel moved out of the house in early 1978, temporarily residing in a motel on North Cleveland Massillon Road.

In May 1978, Dahmer graduated from high school. A few weeks before his graduation, one of his teachers observed Dahmer sitting close to the school parking lot, drinking several cans of beer. When the teacher threatened to report the matter, Dahmer informed him he was experiencing "a lot of problems" at home and that the school's guidance counselor was aware of them. That spring, Joyce—contrary to a court order and without informing Lionel—moved out of the family home with David to live with relatives in Chippewa Falls, Wisconsin. Dahmer had just turned 18 and remained in the family home. Dahmer's parents' divorce was finalized on July 24, 1978. Joyce was awarded sole custody of their younger son and alimony payments.

== Late teens and early 20s: first murder ==
=== Murder of Steven Hicks ===
Dahmer committed his first murder in 1978, three weeks after his graduation. On June 18, Dahmer picked up a hitchhiker named Steven Mark Hicks, who was 18 years old. Hicks, who had been hitchhiking to a rock concert at Chippewa Lake Park, agreed to accompany Dahmer to his house upon the promise of "a few beers" with Dahmer, who had the house to himself.

According to Dahmer, the sight of the bare-chested Hicks standing at the roadside stirred his sexual feelings, although when Hicks began talking about girls, he knew any sexual passes he made would be rebuffed. After several hours of talking, drinking, and listening to music, Hicks "wanted to leave and I didn't want him to leave". Dahmer bludgeoned Hicks with a 10-pound (4.5 kg) dumbbell. He later stated he struck Hicks twice from behind with the dumbbell as Hicks sat upon a chair. When Hicks fell unconscious, Dahmer strangled him to death with the bar of the dumbbell, then stripped the clothes from Hicks's body before exploring his chest with his hands, then masturbating as he stood above the corpse. Hours later, Dahmer dragged the body to the basement. (Note: A September 1992 FBI report on Dahmer indicates he also confessed to engaging in sex with Hicks's body prior to dismembering the corpse.)

The following day, Dahmer dissected Hicks's body in the basement. He later buried the remains in a shallow grave in his backyard. Several weeks later, he unearthed the remains and pared the flesh from the bones. He dissolved the flesh in acid before flushing the solution down the toilet; he crushed the bones with a sledgehammer and scattered them in the woodland behind the family home. He threw Hicks's necklace and the knife used to dismember him from the West Bath Road Bridge into the Cuyahoga River.

=== College and Army service ===
Six weeks after the murder of Hicks, Dahmer's father and his fiancée returned to his home, where they discovered Dahmer living alone. That August, Dahmer enrolled at Ohio State University (OSU), hoping to major in business. Dahmer's sole term at OSU was completely unproductive, largely because of his persistent alcohol abuse. He received failing grades in Introduction to Anthropology, Classical Civilizations, and Administrative Science. The only course Dahmer was successful at was Riflery, in which he received a B− grade. His overall GPA was 0.45/4.0. On one occasion, Lionel paid a surprise visit to his son, only to find his dormitory room strewn with empty liquor bottles. Despite his father having paid in advance for the second term, Dahmer dropped out of OSU after just three months.

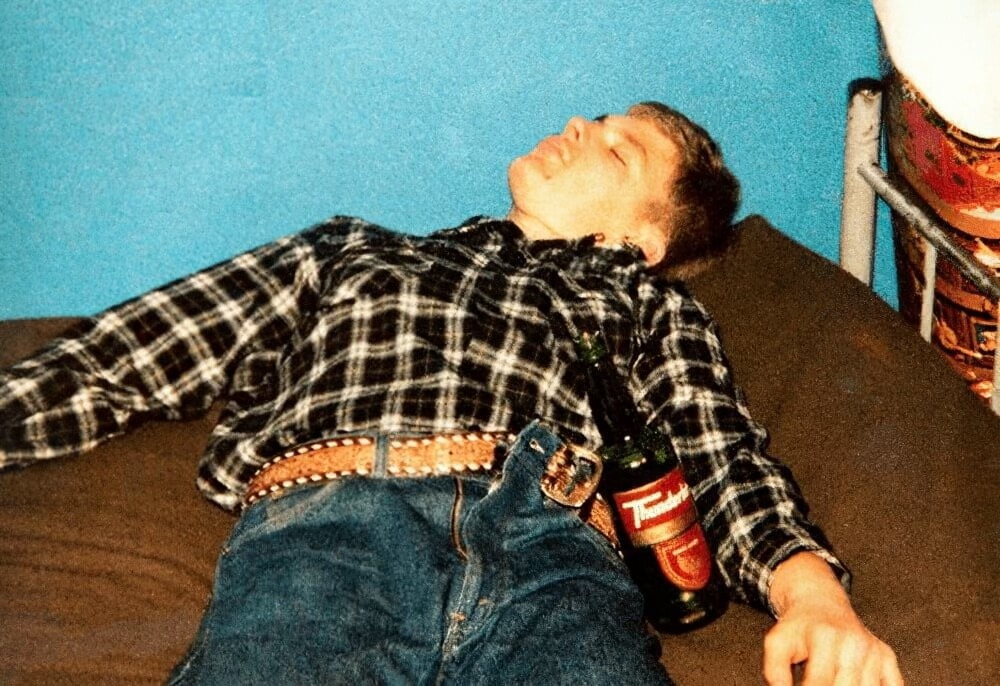
Dahmer, pictured in West Germany in 1979. His off-duty drinking caused him to be deemed unsuitable for military service in 1981.

In January 1979, on his father's urging, Dahmer enlisted in the United States Army. He underwent basic training at Fort McClellan in Anniston, Alabama, before training as a medical specialist at Fort Sam Houston in San Antonio, Texas. He was occasionally reprimanded for intoxication while stationed at Fort Sam Houston. On one occasion, an instance of insubordination resulted in his entire platoon being punished, earning Dahmer a severe beating from his fellow recruits.

On July 13, 1979, Dahmer was deployed to Baumholder, West Germany, where he served as a combat medic in the 2nd Battalion of the 68th Armor Regiment, 8th Infantry Division. According to published reports, in Dahmer's first year of service, he was an "average or slightly above average" soldier. (Note: Two soldiers have since claimed to have been raped by Dahmer while in the Army. In 2010, one stated that Dahmer had repeatedly raped him over a 17-month period while they were both stationed at Baumholder, while another soldier believes Dahmer drugged and raped him inside an armored personnel carrier in 1979. However, in numerous interviews following his 1991 arrest, Dahmer stated to both police and psychiatrists he did not sexually assault or engage in willing homosexual relations while stationed in West Germany.)

Owing to Dahmer's alcohol abuse, his performance deteriorated, and, in March 1981, he was deemed unsuitable for military service and was later discharged from the Army. He received an honorable discharge, as his superiors did not believe that any problems Dahmer exhibited in the Army would be applicable to civilian life.

On March 24, 1981, Dahmer was sent to Fort Jackson in South Carolina for debriefing and provided with a plane ticket to travel anywhere in the country. Dahmer later told police he felt he could not return home to face his father, so he opted to travel to Miami Beach, Florida, both because he was "tired of the cold" and in an attempt to live by his own means. In Florida, Dahmer found a job at a delicatessen and rented a room in a nearby motel. He spent most of his salary on alcohol and was soon evicted from the motel for non-payment. Dahmer initially spent his evenings on the beach as he continued to work at the sandwich shop until phoning his father and asking to return to Ohio in September of the same year.

=== Return to Ohio and relocation to West Allis, Wisconsin ===
After his return to Ohio, Dahmer initially lived with his father and stepmother and insisted on being delegated numerous chores to occupy his time while he looked for work. He continued to drink heavily, and two weeks after his return, he was arrested for drunk and disorderly conduct. He was fined $60 and given a suspended 10-day jail sentence. Dahmer's father tried unsuccessfully to wean his son off alcohol. In December 1981, he and his second wife sent him to live with his paternal grandmother, Catherine Dahmer, in West Allis, Wisconsin. As she was the only family member to whom Dahmer displayed any positivity or affection, they hoped that both her influence and the change of location might persuade him to quit drinking, find a job, and live responsibly.

Initially, Dahmer's living arrangements with his grandmother were harmonious: he accompanied her to church, willingly undertook chores, actively sought work, and abided by most of her house rules (although he continued to drink and smoke). In early 1982, he found employment as a phlebotomist at the Milwaukee Blood Plasma Center. He held this job for a total of ten months before being laid off. Dahmer remained unemployed for over two years, during which he lived on whatever money his grandmother gave him.

Shortly before losing his job, Dahmer was arrested for indecent exposure. On August 8, 1982, at Wisconsin State Fair Park, he was observed exposing himself "on the south side of the Coliseum in which 25 people were present including women and children". For this incident, he was convicted and fined $50 plus court costs.

In January 1985, Dahmer was hired as a mixer at the Milwaukee Ambrosia Chocolate Factory, where he worked from 11 p.m to 7 a.m. six nights per week, with Saturday evenings off. Shortly after he started this job, an incident occurred in which Dahmer was propositioned by another man while reading in the West Allis Public Library. The stranger threw Dahmer a note offering to perform fellatio upon him. Although Dahmer did not respond to this proposition, the incident stirred the fantasies of control and dominance he had developed as a teenager, and he began to familiarize himself with Milwaukee's gay bars, gay bathhouses, and bookstores. He also stole a male mannequin from a store, which he briefly used for sexual stimulation, until his grandmother discovered the item stowed in a closet and demanded that he discard it.

By late 1985, Dahmer had begun to regularly frequent the bathhouses, which he later described as being "relaxing places", but during his sexual encounters, he became frustrated at his partners' moving during the act. Following his arrest, he stated: "I trained myself to view people as objects of pleasure instead of [as] people". For this reason, beginning in June 1986, he administered sleeping pills to his partners, giving them liquor laced with sedatives. He then waited for his partner to fall asleep before performing various sexual acts. To maintain an adequate supply of this medication, Dahmer informed doctors he worked nights and required the tablets to adjust to that schedule. After approximately 12 such instances, the bathhouses' administration revoked Dahmer's membership, and he began to use hotel rooms to continue this practice.

Shortly after his bathhouse memberships were revoked, Dahmer read a report in a newspaper regarding the upcoming funeral of an 18-year-old male. He conceived the idea of stealing the freshly interred corpse and taking it home. According to Dahmer, he attempted to dig up the coffin from the ground but found the soil too hard and abandoned the plan.

On September 8, 1986, Dahmer was arrested upon a charge of lewd and lascivious behavior for masturbating in the presence of two 12-year-old boys as he stood close to the Kinnickinnic River. He initially claimed he had merely been urinating, unaware that there were witnesses, but soon admitted the offense. (Note: Dahmer also confessed to having committed the same offense on "four or five" previous occasions.) The charge was changed to disorderly conduct and, on March 10, 1987, Dahmer was sentenced to one year of probation, with additional instructions to undergo counseling.

== Late 20s and early 30s: subsequent murders ==
=== Ambassador Hotel ===
On November 20, 1987, Dahmer, at the time still residing with his grandmother, encountered a 25-year-old man from Ontonagon, Michigan, named Steven Tuomi at a bar and persuaded him to return to the Ambassador Hotel in Milwaukee, where Dahmer had rented a room for the evening. According to Dahmer, he had no intention of killing Tuomi, but intended to simply drug him and lie beside him as he explored his body. The following morning, Dahmer awoke to find Tuomi lying beneath him on the bed, his chest "crushed in" and "black and blue" with bruises. Blood was seeping from the corner of his mouth, and Dahmer's fists and one forearm were extensively bruised. Dahmer later said he had no memory of having killed Tuomi, and that he "could not believe this had happened".

Dahmer purchased a large suitcase, in which he transported Tuomi's body to his grandmother's residence. One week later, he severed the head, arms, and legs, then filleted the bones from the body before cutting the flesh into pieces small enough to handle. Dahmer placed the flesh inside plastic garbage bags. He wrapped the bones inside a sheet and pounded them into splinters with a sledgehammer. The dismemberment process took Dahmer approximately two hours. He disposed of all of Tuomi's remains, excluding the head, in the trash.

For two weeks following Tuomi's killing, Dahmer retained Tuomi's head wrapped in a blanket. After two weeks, Dahmer boiled the head in a mixture of Soilax (an alkali-based industrial detergent) and bleach in an effort to retain the skull, which he then used as stimulus for masturbation. Eventually, the skull became too brittle by this bleaching process, so Dahmer pulverized and disposed of it.

=== Intermediate murders ===
According to Dahmer, Tuomi's murder was a pivotal incident after which he did not try to control his compulsions. He began to actively seek victims, most of whom he encountered in or around gay bars, and would typically lure them to his grandmother's home. He would drug his victim with triazolam or temazepam before or shortly after engaging in sexual activity with them. Once his victim was unconscious, he strangled them to death.

Two months after the Tuomi killing, Dahmer encountered a 14-year-old Native American prostitute, James Doxtator. Dahmer lured him to his grandmother's residence with an offer of $50 to pose for nude pictures. They engaged in sexual activity before Dahmer drugged Doxtator and strangled him on the floor of the cellar. Dahmer left the body in the cellar for one week before dismembering it in much the same manner as he had with Tuomi. He placed all of Doxtator's remains (excluding the skull) in the trash. The skull was boiled and cleansed in bleach before Dahmer found that it, too, had been rendered brittle by the process. He pulverized the skull two weeks later.

On March 24, 1988, Dahmer met a 22-year-old bisexual man, Richard Guerrero, outside a gay bar called the Phoenix. Dahmer lured Guerrero to his grandmother's residence, offering him $50 to spend the night with him. He drugged Guerrero with sleeping pills, strangled him with a leather strap, and performed oral sex on the corpse. Dahmer dismembered Guerrero's body within 24 hours, again disposing of the remains in the trash and retaining the skull before pulverizing it several months later.

On April 2, Dahmer encountered 25-year-old Ronald Douglas Flowers Jr. at a pay phone outside a gay bar. Flowers was lured to Dahmer's grandmother's house on the pretense of Dahmer obtaining cables to recharge the battery of Flowers' stranded vehicle; however, after giving Flowers a drugged coffee, both he and Flowers heard Dahmer's grandmother call, "Is that you, Jeff?" Although Dahmer replied in a manner that led his grandmother to believe he was alone, she observed that he was not alone. After Flowers became unconscious, Dahmer decided not to kill him; hours later, while Flowers was still largely incoherent, Dahmer walked him to a bus stop, where he left him. Flowers later woke in the County General Hospital with visible bruise marks upon his neck, and later discovered his underwear was inside-out and a single blond hair in his pubic region.

In September 1988, Dahmer's grandmother asked him to move out, largely because of his drinking, his habit of bringing young men to her house late at night, and the foul smells emanating from the basement and the garage. Dahmer found a one-bedroom apartment at 808 North 24th Street and moved into the residence on September 25. Two days later, he was arrested for drugging and sexually fondling a 13-year-old boy whom he had lured to his home on the pretext of posing nude for photographs.

Dahmer's father hired attorney Gerald Boyle to defend his son. At Boyle's request, Dahmer underwent a series of psychological evaluations prior to his court hearings. The evaluations found that Dahmer harbored deep feelings of alienation. A second evaluation two months later revealed Dahmer to be an impulsive individual, suspicious of others, and dismayed by his lack of accomplishments in life. His probation officer also referenced a 1987 diagnosis of Dahmer suffering from a schizoid personality disorder for presentation to the court.

On January 30, 1989, Dahmer pleaded guilty to the charges of second-degree sexual assault and of enticing a child for immoral purposes. Sentencing was suspended until May. On March 20, Dahmer commenced a ten-day Easter absence from work, during which he moved back into his grandmother's home.

Two months after his conviction and two months prior to his sentencing, Dahmer murdered his fifth victim, a 24-year-old mixed-race aspiring model, Anthony Sears, whom he met at a gay bar on March 25, 1989. According to Dahmer, on this particular occasion he was not looking to commit a crime; however, shortly before closing time that evening, Sears "just started talking to me". Dahmer lured Sears to his grandmother's home, where the pair engaged in oral sex before Dahmer drugged and strangled Sears.

The following morning, Dahmer placed the corpse in his grandmother's bathtub, where he decapitated the body before attempting to flay the corpse. He stripped the flesh from the body and pulverized the bones, which he disposed of in the trash. According to Dahmer, he found Sears "exceptionally attractive", and Sears was the first victim from whom he permanently retained any body parts: he preserved Sears' head and genitalia in acetone and stored them in a wooden box, which he later placed in his work locker. (Note: On one occasion, Dahmer's father observed this box at Dahmer's grandmother's house. When he asked Dahmer to open the box, Dahmer became defensive and angry, claiming the box contained pornographic magazines and stating: "Can't I have just one square foot of privacy?" He then promised to open the box the following day, indicating to his father the box contained pornography. His father acceded to his request.) When he moved to a new address the following year, he took the remains there.

On May 23, 1989, Dahmer was sentenced to five years' probation and one year in the House of Correction, with work release permitted so he could keep his job. He was also required to register as a sex offender. Two months before his scheduled release, Dahmer was paroled from this regimen. His five years' probation imposed in 1989 began at this point. Dahmer temporarily moved back to his grandmother's home in West Allis.

=== Oxford Apartments ===
==== 1990 murders ====
On May 14, 1990, Dahmer moved out of his grandmother's house and into 924 North 25th Street, Apartment 213, taking Sears' mummified head and genitals with him. (Note: Shortly after moving into 924 North 25th Street, Dahmer purchased granite spray-paint from an art store. Having removed all flesh from Sears' head, he used this substance to spray-paint the skull and Sears' genitals. Dahmer also retained Sears' scalp.) Although located in a high-crime area, Dahmer's new apartment was close to his workplace, was furnished, and at $300 per month inclusive of all bills excluding electricity, was economical. Within one week of his moving to this address, Dahmer killed his sixth victim, Raymond Smith. Smith was a 32-year-old prostitute whom Dahmer lured to his apartment with the promise of $50 for sex. Inside the apartment, he gave Smith a drink laced with seven sleeping pills, then manually strangled him.

The following day, Dahmer purchased a Polaroid camera, with which he took several pictures of Smith's body in suggestive positions before dismembering him in the bathroom. He boiled the legs, arms, and pelvis in a steel kettle with Soilax, which allowed him to rinse the bones in his sink. Dahmer dissolved the remainder of Smith's skeleton—excluding the skull—in a container filled with acid. He later spray-painted Smith's skull, which he placed alongside the skull of Sears upon a black towel inside a filing cabinet.

Approximately one week after the murder of Smith, on or about May 27, Dahmer lured another young man to his apartment. On this occasion, Dahmer accidentally consumed the drink laden with sedatives intended for his victim. When he awoke the following day, he discovered the man had stolen several items of clothing, $300 in cash and a watch. Dahmer never reported this incident to the police, although on May 29, he divulged to his probation officer that he had been robbed.

In June 1990, Dahmer lured a 27-year-old acquaintance, Edward Smith, to his apartment, where he drugged and strangled him. On this occasion, rather than immediately acidifying the skeleton or repeating previous processes of bleaching, which had rendered previous victims' skulls brittle, Dahmer placed Smith's skeleton in his freezer for several months in the hope it would not retain moisture. Freezing the skeleton did not remove moisture, and the skeleton of this victim was acidified several months later. Dahmer accidentally destroyed the skull when he placed it in the oven to dry—a process that caused the skull to explode. Dahmer later informed police he had felt "rotten" about Smith's murder, as he had been unable to retain any parts of his body.

It was my way of remembering their appearance, their physical beauty. I also wanted to keep ... if I couldn't keep them there with me whole, I at least could keep their skeletons.

— Jeffrey Dahmer, recollecting his motivations for both photographing his victims, and retaining sections of their skeletal structure. February 1993.

Less than three months after the murder of Edward Smith, Dahmer encountered a 22-year-old Chicago native named Ernest Miller outside a bookstore on the corner of North 27th Street. Miller agreed to accompany Dahmer to his apartment for $50 and further agreed to allow him to listen to his heart and stomach. When Dahmer attempted to perform oral sex upon Miller, he was informed, "That'll cost you extra", whereupon Dahmer gave Miller a drink laced with sleeping pills.

On this occasion, Dahmer had only two sleeping pills to give his victim. Therefore, he killed Miller by slashing his carotid artery with the same knife he used to dissect his victims' bodies. Miller bled to death within minutes. Dahmer then posed the nude body for various suggestive Polaroid photographs before placing it in his bathtub for dismemberment. Dahmer repeatedly kissed and talked to the severed head while he dismembered the remainder of the body.

Dahmer wrapped Miller's heart, liver, biceps, and portions of flesh from the legs in plastic bags and placed them in the freezer for later consumption. He boiled the remaining flesh and organs into a "jelly-like substance" using Soilax, which enabled him to rinse the flesh off the skeleton, which he intended to retain. To preserve the skeleton, Dahmer placed the bones in a light bleach solution for 24 hours before allowing them to dry upon a cloth for one week. The severed head was initially placed in the refrigerator before being stripped of flesh, then painted and coated with enamel.

Three weeks after the murder of Miller, on September 24, Dahmer encountered a 22-year-old father of two named David Thomas at the Grand Avenue Mall. He persuaded him to return to his apartment for a few drinks, with additional money on offer if he would pose for photographs. In his statement to police after his arrest, Dahmer said that, after giving Thomas a drink laden with sedatives, he did not feel attracted to him, but was afraid to allow him to awaken, fearing that he would be angry over having been drugged. Therefore, he strangled him and dismembered the body—intentionally retaining no body parts whatsoever. He photographed the dismemberment process and retained these photographs, which later aided in Thomas's identification.

Following the murder of Thomas, Dahmer did not kill anyone for almost five months, although on a minimum of five occasions between October 1990 and February 1991, he unsuccessfully attempted to lure men to his apartment. He regularly complained of feelings of both anxiety and depression to his probation officer throughout 1990, with frequent references to his sexuality, his solitary lifestyle, financial difficulties, and—shortly before Thanksgiving—his apprehension regarding meeting and facing his father and younger brother. On several occasions, Dahmer also referred to harboring suicidal thoughts.

==== 1991 murders ====
In February 1991, Dahmer observed a 17-year-old named Curtis Straughter standing at a bus stop near Marquette University. According to Dahmer, he lured Straughter into his apartment with an offer of money for posing for nude photos, with the added incentive of sexual intercourse. Dahmer drugged Straughter, cuffed his hands behind his back, then strangled him to death with a leather strap. He then dismembered Straughter, retaining his skull, hands, and genitals and photographing each stage of the dismemberment process.

Less than two months later, on April 7, Dahmer encountered a 19-year-old named Errol Lindsey walking to get a key cut. Dahmer lured Lindsey to his apartment where he drugged him, then drilled a hole in his skull through which he injected hydrochloric acid with a baster. According to Dahmer, Lindsey awoke after this experiment (which Dahmer had conceived in the hope of inducing a permanent, unresistant, submissive state), saying: "I have a headache. What time is it?" In response to this, Dahmer again drugged Lindsey, then strangled him. He decapitated Lindsey and retained his skull. He then flayed Lindsey's body, placing the skin in a solution of cold water and salt for several weeks in the hope of permanently retaining it. Reluctantly, he disposed of Lindsey's skin when he noted it had become too frayed and brittle.

By 1991, fellow residents of the Oxford Apartments had repeatedly complained to the building's manager, Sopa Princewill, of the foul smells emanating from Apartment 213, in addition to the sounds of falling objects and the occasional sound of a chainsaw. Princewill contacted Dahmer in response to these complaints on several occasions, although he initially excused the odors emanating from his apartment as being caused by his freezer breaking, causing the contents to become "spoiled". On later occasions, he informed Princewill that the reason for the resurgence of the odor was that several of his tropical fish had recently died, and that he would take care of the matter.

On May 24, 1991, Dahmer encountered 31-year-old aspiring model Tony Hughes at a nightclub. He was lured to Dahmer's apartment with an offer of money to pose for photographs. (Note: According to a friend of Hughes named Michael Ross, Hughes had known Dahmer "for a long time" prior to his murder. Ross further expounded: "Tony and Jeff had had [sexual] relations. Tony told me so.") Hughes was drugged into unconsciousness before Dahmer injected hydrochloric acid into his skull in an effort to disable his will and render him submissive, although on this occasion, the drilling and injection proved fatal.

Konerak Sinthasomphone

On the afternoon of May 26, 1991, Dahmer encountered a 14-year-old Lao teenager, Konerak Sinthasomphone, on Wisconsin Avenue. Unknown to Dahmer, Sinthasomphone was the younger brother of the boy he had molested in 1988. Dahmer offered Sinthasomphone money to accompany him to his apartment to pose for Polaroid pictures. According to Dahmer, Sinthasomphone was initially reluctant to the proposal, before changing his mind and accompanying him to his apartment, where he posed for two pictures in his underwear before Dahmer drugged him into unconsciousness and performed oral sex on him. Before Sinthasomphone fell unconscious, Dahmer led the boy into his bedroom, where the body of Tony Hughes, whom Dahmer had killed three days earlier, lay naked on the floor. According to Dahmer, he "believed [that Sinthasomphone] saw this body" yet did not react to seeing the bloated corpse—likely because of the effects of the sleeping pills he had ingested.

On this occasion, Dahmer drilled a single narrow hole into the crown of Sinthasomphone's skull, through which he injected hydrochloric acid into the frontal lobe. Dahmer then drank several beers while lying alongside Sinthasomphone before briefly falling asleep, then leaving his apartment to drink at a bar and purchase more alcohol.

In the early morning hours of May 27, Dahmer returned toward his apartment to discover Sinthasomphone sitting naked on the corner of 25th and State, talking in Lao, with three distressed young women standing near him. Dahmer approached the women and told them that Sinthasomphone (whom he referred to by the alias John Hmong) was his friend, and attempted to lead him to his apartment by the arm. The three women dissuaded Dahmer, explaining they had phoned 9-1-1.

Upon the arrival of two Milwaukee police officers, John Balcerzak and Joseph Gabrish, Dahmer's demeanor relaxed: he told the officers that Sinthasomphone was his 19-year-old boyfriend, that he had drunk too much following a quarrel, and that he frequently behaved in this manner when intoxicated. Dahmer added his lover had consumed Jack Daniel's whiskey that evening.

The three women were exasperated, and when one of the trio attempted to indicate to one of the officers—both of whom had observed no injuries beyond a scrape to Sinthasomphone's knee and believed him to be intoxicated—that Sinthasomphone had blood upon his testicles, was bleeding from his rectum and that he had seemingly struggled against Dahmer's attempts to walk him to his apartment prior to their arrival, (Note: The witnesses' observations regarding blood upon Sinthasomphone's testicles and rectum were not corroborated by either the Milwaukee police officers or members of the Milwaukee Fire Department who also arrived at the scene.) the officer harshly informed her to "butt out", "shut the hell up" and to not interfere.

Shortly after the arrival of the Milwaukee police officers, three members of the Milwaukee Fire Department arrived at the scene. These individuals also examined Sinthasomphone for injuries and provided a yellow blanket for the police officers to cover Sinthasomphone. One of the three believed Sinthasomphone needed treatment, but the police officers directed the fire department personnel to leave. Shortly thereafter, officer Richard Porubcan arrived at the scene. (Note: The family of Sinthasomphone would later sue the City of Milwaukee and the three police officers, alleging violations of the Equal Protection Clause of the Fourteenth Amendment. These charges were summarily dismissed.) He and Gabrish—followed by Balcerzak—escorted Dahmer and Sinthasomphone to Dahmer's apartment as Dahmer repeatedly commented on the general crime in the neighborhood and of his appreciation of the police.

Inside his apartment and in an effort to verify his claim that he and Sinthasomphone were lovers, Dahmer showed the officers the two semi-nude Polaroid pictures he had taken of Sinthasomphone the previous evening. Though Balcerzak said he smelled nothing unusual, Gabrish later stated he noted a strange scent reminiscent of excrement inside the apartment. This odor emanated from the decomposing body of Hughes. Dahmer stated that to investigate this odor, one officer simply "peeked his head around the bedroom, but really didn't take a good look". (Note: Had Balcerzak and Gabrish conducted a background check pertaining to this incident, the check would have revealed Dahmer was on probation for the September 1988 sexual assault of a thirteen-year-old boy—incidentally Sinthasomphone's older brother.) The officers then left, with a departing remark that Dahmer "take good care" of Sinthasomphone. This incident was listed by the officers as a "domestic dispute". (Note: Having left Sinthasomphone in the company of Dahmer, the patrol unit which had responded to the women's 911 call then radioed their dispatch unit. Above evident laughter from one or more of his colleagues, one officer informed his dispatch unit: "Intoxicated, Asian, naked male was returned to his sober boyfriend ... My partner [is] going to get deloused at the station.")

Upon the departure of the three officers from his apartment, Dahmer again injected hydrochloric acid into Sinthasomphone's brain. This second injection proved fatal. The following day, May 28, Dahmer took a day's leave from work to devote himself to the dismemberment of the bodies of Sinthasomphone and Hughes. He retained both victims' skulls.

On June 30, Dahmer traveled to Chicago, where he encountered a 20-year-old named Matt Turner at a bus station. Turner accepted Dahmer's offer to travel to Milwaukee for a professional photo shoot. At the apartment, Dahmer drugged, strangled and dismembered Turner and placed his head and internal organs in separate plastic bags in the freezer. Turner was not reported missing.

Five days later, on July 5, Dahmer lured 23-year-old Jeremiah Weinberger from a Chicago bar to his apartment on the promise of spending the weekend with him. He drugged Weinberger and twice injected boiling water through his skull, sending him into a coma from which he died two days later. (Note: Dahmer chose to inject boiling water as opposed to hydrochloric acid into Weinberger's skull as three previous attempts to render victims unresistant and submissive via acid injections had been unsuccessful.)

On July 15, Dahmer encountered 24-year-old Oliver Lacy at the corner of 27th and Kilbourn. Lacy agreed to Dahmer's ruse of posing nude for photographs and accompanied him to his apartment, where the pair engaged in tentative sexual activity before Dahmer drugged Lacy. On this occasion, Dahmer intended to prolong the time he spent with Lacy while alive. After unsuccessfully attempting to render Lacy unconscious with chloroform, he phoned his workplace to request a day's absence; this was granted, although the next day, he was suspended.

After strangling Lacy, Dahmer had sex with the corpse before dismembering him. He placed Lacy's head and heart in the refrigerator and his skeleton in the freezer. Four days later, on July 19, Dahmer received word that he was dismissed. Upon receipt of this news, Dahmer lured 25-year-old Joseph Bradehoft to his apartment. Bradehoft was strangled and left lying on Dahmer's bed covered with a sheet for two days. On July 21, Dahmer removed the sheet to find the head covered in maggots. He decapitated the body, cleaned the head and placed it in the refrigerator. He later acidified Bradehoft's torso, along with those of two other victims killed within the previous month.

== Arrest ==
=== Capture ===
On the afternoon of July 22, 1991, Dahmer engaged in conversation with three men at the Grand Avenue Mall; he offered each $100 to accompany him to his apartment to pose for nude photographs, drink beer and simply keep him company. Only one of the three, 32-year-old Tracy Edwards, agreed to accompany him to his apartment. Upon entering Dahmer's apartment, Edwards noted a foul odor and several boxes of hydrochloric acid on the floor, which Dahmer claimed to use for cleaning bricks. After some minor conversation, Edwards responded to Dahmer's request to turn his head and view his tropical fish, whereupon Dahmer placed a handcuff upon his wrist. When Edwards asked, "What's happening?" Dahmer unsuccessfully attempted to cuff his wrists together, then told Edwards to accompany him to the bedroom to pose for nude pictures. While inside the bedroom, Edwards noted nude male posters on the wall and that a videotape of The Exorcist III was playing. He also noted a blue 57-gallon drum in the corner, from which a strong odor emanated.

Dahmer then brandished a knife and informed Edwards he intended to take nude pictures of him. In an attempt to appease Dahmer, Edwards unbuttoned his shirt, saying he would allow him to do so if he would remove the handcuffs and put the knife away. In response to this promise, Dahmer simply turned his attention towards the TV. Edwards observed Dahmer rocking back and forth and chanting before turning his attention back to him. He placed his head on Edwards's chest, listened to his heartbeat and, with the knife pressed against his intended victim, informed Edwards he intended to eat his heart.

In an effort to prevent Dahmer from attacking him, Edwards repeated that he was Dahmer's friend and that he was not going to run away. Edwards had decided he was going to either jump from a window or run through the unlocked front door upon the next available opportunity. When Edwards next stated he needed to use the bathroom, he asked if they could sit with a beer in the living room, where there was air conditioning. Dahmer consented, and the pair walked to the living room when Edwards exited the bathroom. Inside the living room, Edwards waited until he observed Dahmer have a momentary lapse of concentration before requesting to use the bathroom again. When Edwards rose from the couch, he noted Dahmer was not holding the handcuffs, whereupon Edwards punched him in the face, knocking Dahmer off balance, and ran out the front door.

At 11:30 p.m. on July 22, Edwards flagged down two Milwaukee police officers, Robert Rauth and Rolf Mueller, at the corner of North 25th Street. The officers noted Edwards had a handcuff attached to his wrist, whereupon he explained to the officers that a "freak" had placed the handcuffs upon him and asked if the police could remove them. When the officers' handcuff keys failed to fit the brand of handcuffs, Edwards agreed to accompany the officers to the apartment where, Edwards stated, he had spent the previous five hours before escaping.

When the officers and Edwards arrived at Apartment 213, Dahmer invited the trio inside and acknowledged he had placed the handcuffs upon Edwards, although he offered no explanation as to why he had done so. At this point, Edwards divulged to the officers that Dahmer had also brandished a large knife upon him and that this had happened in the bedroom. Dahmer made no comment to this revelation, indicating to one of the officers, Mueller, that the key to the handcuffs was in his bedside dresser. As Mueller entered the bedroom, Dahmer attempted to pass Mueller to retrieve the key himself, whereupon the second officer present, Rauth, informed him to "back off".

In the bedroom, Mueller noted there was a large knife beneath the bed. He saw an open drawer that, upon closer inspection, contained scores of Polaroid pictures—many of which were of human bodies in various stages of dismemberment. Mueller noted the decor indicated they had been taken in the same apartment in which they were standing. Mueller walked into the living room to show them to his partner, uttering the words, "These are for real."

When Dahmer saw that Mueller was holding several of his Polaroids, he fought with the officers in an effort to resist arrest. The officers quickly overpowered him, cuffed his hands behind his back, and called a second squad car for backup. At this point, Mueller opened the refrigerator to reveal the freshly severed head of a black male on the bottom shelf. As Dahmer lay pinned on the floor beneath Rauth, he turned his head towards the officers and muttered the words: "For what I did I should be dead."

A more detailed search of the apartment, conducted by the Milwaukee police's Criminal Investigation Bureau, revealed a total of four severed heads in Dahmer's kitchen. A total of seven skulls—some painted, some bleached—were found in Dahmer's bedroom and inside a closet. Investigators discovered collected blood drippings upon a tray at the bottom of Dahmer's refrigerator, plus two human hearts and a portion of arm muscle, each wrapped inside plastic bags upon the shelves. In Dahmer's freezer, investigators discovered an entire torso, plus a bag of human organs and flesh stuck to the ice at the bottom.

Private contractors from the Fire Department's Hazardous Materials Unit remove the 57-gallon drum from Dahmer's apartment, July 23, 1991.

Elsewhere in Apartment 213, investigators discovered two entire skeletons, a pair of severed hands, two severed and preserved penises, a mummified scalp and, in the 57-gallon drum, three further dismembered torsos dissolving in the acid solution. A total of 74 Polaroid pictures detailing the dismemberment of Dahmer's victims were found. In reference to the recovery of body parts and artifacts at 924 North 25th Street, the chief medical examiner later stated: "It was more like dismantling someone's museum than an actual crime scene."

=== Confession ===
Beginning in the early hours of July 23, 1991, Dahmer was questioned by Detective Patrick Kennedy as to the murders he had committed and the evidence found at his apartment. Over the following two weeks, Kennedy and, later, Detective Dennis Murphy conducted numerous interviews with Dahmer which, when combined, totaled over 60 hours, with the detectives ultimately compiling a 178-page confession. Dahmer waived his right to have a lawyer present throughout his interrogations, adding he wished to confess all as he had "created this horror and it only makes sense I do everything to put an end to it". He readily admitted to having murdered sixteen young men in Wisconsin since 1987, with one further victim—Steven Hicks—killed in Ohio in 1978.

Most of Dahmer's victims had been rendered unconscious prior to their murder, although some had died as a result of having acid or boiling water injected into their brain. As he had no memory of the killing of his second victim, Steven Tuomi, he was unsure whether he was unconscious when beaten to death, although he did concede it was possible that his viewing the exposed chest of Tuomi while in a drunken stupor may have led him to unsuccessfully attempt to tear Tuomi's heart from his chest. Almost all the murders Dahmer committed after moving into the Oxford Apartments had involved a ritual of posing the victims' bodies in suggestive positions—typically with the chest thrust outwards—prior to dismemberment.

Dahmer readily admitted to engaging in acts of necrophilia with several of his victims' bodies, including performing sexual acts with their viscera as he dismembered their bodies in his bathtub. Having noted that much of the blood pooled inside his victims' chest after death, Dahmer first removed their internal organs, then suspended the torso so the blood drained into his bathtub, before dicing any organs he did not wish to retain and paring the flesh from the body. The bones he wished to dispose of were pulverized or acidified, with Soilax and bleach solutions used to aid in the preservation of the skeletons and skulls he wished to keep. Dahmer confessed to having consumed the hearts, liver, biceps, and portions of thigh of three victims he had killed at the Oxford Apartments (Raymond Smith, Ernest Miller and Oliver Lacy), and to have retained the flesh and organs of other victims for intended consumption. Typically, Dahmer would tenderize the body parts he intended to consume prior to preparing meals flavored with various condiments. (Note: Dahmer purchased this meat tenderizer after attempting to consume the thigh muscle of one victim and discovering the flesh was "so tough he could hardly chew it".)

Referencing his reasons for consuming his victims, Dahmer stated he had initially consumed portions of his victims due to "curiosity" before adding: "I suppose, in an odd way, it made me feel they were even more a permanent part of me."

Describing the increase in his rate of killing in the two months prior to his arrest, Dahmer stated he had been "completely swept along" with his compulsion to kill, adding: "It was an incessant and never-ending desire to be with someone at whatever cost. Someone good looking, really nice looking. It just filled my thoughts all day long." When asked as to why he had preserved a total of seven skulls and the entire skeletons of two victims, Dahmer stated he had been in the process of constructing a private altar of victims' skulls which he had intended to display on the black table located in his living room and upon which he had photographed the bodies of many of his victims.

An illustration provided by Dahmer depicting the private altar he had been planning to create at the time of his July 1991 arrest

This display of skulls was to be adorned at each side with the complete skeletons of Miller and Lacy. The four severed heads found in his kitchen were to have all flesh removed and used in this altar, as was the skull of at least one future victim. Incense sticks were to be placed at each end of the black table, above which Dahmer intended to place a large blue lamp with extending blue globe lights. The entire construction was to be placed upon a black and white carpet before a window covered with a black, opaque shower curtain, in front of which Dahmer intended to sit in a black leather chair as he composed his thoughts and drew an intended sense of peace and tranquility.

When asked in a November 18, 1991 interview to whom the altar was dedicated, Dahmer replied: "Myself ... It was a place where I could feel at home." He further described his intended altar as a "place for meditation", from where he believed he could draw a sense of power, adding: "If this [his arrest] had happened six months later, that's what they would have found."

=== Indictment ===
On July 25, 1991, Dahmer was charged with four counts of first-degree murder. By August 22, he had been charged with a further eleven murders committed in Wisconsin. On September 14, investigators in Ohio, having uncovered hundreds of bone fragments in woodland behind the address in which Dahmer had confessed to killing his first victim, formally identified two molars and a vertebra with X-ray records of Hicks. Three days later, Dahmer was charged by authorities in Ohio with Hicks's murder.

Dahmer was not charged with the attempted murder of Edwards, nor with the murder of Tuomi. He was not charged with Tuomi's murder because the district attorney only brought charges where murder could be proven beyond a reasonable doubt and Dahmer had no memory of actually committing this particular murder, for which no physical evidence of the crime existed. At a scheduled preliminary hearing on January 13, 1992, Dahmer pleaded guilty but insane to 15 counts of murder.

== Trial ==
Dahmer's trial began on January 30, 1992. He was tried in Milwaukee for the 15 counts of first-degree murder before Judge Laurence Gram. By pleading guilty on January 13 to the charges brought against him, Dahmer had waived his rights to a trial to establish guilt, as defined in Wisconsin law. Attorneys at Dahmer's trial debated whether he suffered from either a mental or a personality disorder. The prosecution claimed that any disorders did not deprive Dahmer of the ability to appreciate the criminality of his conduct or to deprive him of the ability to resist his impulses. The defense argued that Dahmer suffered from a mental disease and was driven by obsessions and impulses he was unable to control.

Defense experts argued that Dahmer was insane due to his necrophilic drive—his compulsion to have sexual encounters with corpses. Defense expert Fred Berlin testified that Dahmer was unable to conform his conduct at the time that he committed the crimes due to his paraphilia or, more specifically, necrophilia. Judith Becker, a professor of psychiatry and psychology, was the second expert witness for the defense. Becker diagnosed Dahmer as a necrophiliac, although she added Dahmer had informed her, he preferred comatose sexual partners to deceased ones "75 percent" of the time. The final defense expert to testify, forensic psychiatrist Carl Wahlstrom, diagnosed Dahmer with necrophilia, borderline personality disorder, schizotypal personality disorder, alcohol dependence, and a psychotic disorder.

On February 8, a psychiatrist, Dr. Fred Fosdal, testified on behalf of the prosecution. Fosdal testified to his belief that Dahmer was without mental disease or defect at the time he committed the murders. He described Dahmer as a calculating and cunning individual, able to differentiate between right and wrong, with the ability to control his actions, and whose lust overpowered his morals. Although Fosdal did state his belief that Dahmer was a paraphiliac, his conclusion was that Dahmer was not a sadist.

The second and final witness to appear for the prosecution, forensic psychiatrist Park Dietz, began his testimony on February 12. Dietz testified that he did not believe Dahmer had any form of mental disease or defect at the time that he committed the crimes, stating that "Dahmer went to great lengths to be alone with his victim and to have no witnesses." He explained that there was ample evidence that Dahmer prepared in advance for each murder, and therefore, his crimes were not impulsive. Although Dietz did concede any acquisition of a paraphilia was not a matter of personal choice, he stated his belief that Dahmer's habit of becoming intoxicated prior to committing each of the murders was significant; "If he had an impulse to kill or a compulsion to kill", Dietz testified, "he wouldn't have to drink alcohol to overcome it. He only has to drink alcohol to overcome it because he is inhibited against killing."

Dietz noted that Dahmer strongly identified with the villains of The Exorcist III and Return of the Jedi, particularly the level of power held by these characters. Expounding on the significance of these movies on Dahmer's psyche and many of the murders committed at the Oxford Apartments, Dietz explained that Dahmer occasionally viewed scenes from these films before searching for a victim. Dietz diagnosed Dahmer with substance use disorder, paraphilia, and schizotypal personality disorder.

Forensic psychiatrist George Palermo and clinical psychologist Samuel Friedman testified about Dahmer's pathology independently of either prosecution or defense. Palermo stated that Dahmer was motivated to commit murder by a "pent-up aggression within himself. He killed those men because he wanted to kill the source of his homosexual attraction to them. In killing them, he killed what he hated in himself." Palermo concluded that Dahmer had a severe mixed personality disorder, with antisocial, obsessive–compulsive, sadistic, fetishistic, borderline and necrophilic features, but otherwise legally sane.

Friedman testified that it was a longing for companionship that caused Dahmer to kill and testified that Dahmer was not psychotic. He described Dahmer as "amiable, pleasant to be with, courteous, with a sense of humor, conventionally handsome, and charming in manner. He was, and still is, a bright young man." He diagnosed Dahmer with a personality disorder not otherwise specified featuring borderline, obsessive–compulsive, and sadistic traits.

=== Closing arguments ===
The trial lasted two weeks. On February 14, both attorneys delivered their closing arguments to the jury. Each attorney was allowed to speak for two hours. Defense attorney Gerald Boyle argued first. Repeatedly referring to the testimony of the mental health professionals—almost all of whom had agreed Dahmer was afflicted with a mental disease—Boyle argued that Dahmer's compulsive killings had been a result of "a sickness he discovered, not chose". Boyle portrayed Dahmer as a desperately lonely and profoundly sick individual "so out of control he could not conform his conduct anymore".

Following the defense counsel's 75-minute closing argument, Michael McCann delivered his closing argument for the prosecution, describing Dahmer as a sane man, in full control of his actions, who simply strove to avoid detection. McCann described Dahmer as a calculating individual who killed to control his victims and retained their bodies "merely to afford" himself a prolonged period of sexual pleasure. McCann argued that by pleading guilty but insane to the charges, Dahmer was seeking to escape responsibility for his crimes.

=== Conviction ===
On February 15, the court reconvened to hear the verdict: Dahmer was ruled to be sane and not suffering from a mental disorder at the time of each of the 15 murders for which he was tried, although in each count, two of the twelve jurors signified their dissent. Formal sentencing was postponed until February 17. On this date, Dahmer's attorney announced his client wished to address the court. Dahmer then approached a lectern and read from a statement prepared by himself and his defense as he faced the judge.

In this statement, Dahmer emphasized that he had never desired freedom following his arrest, and that he "frankly" wished for his own death. He further stressed that none of his murders had been motivated by hatred, that he understood that nothing he either said or did could "undo the terrible harm" he had caused to the families of his victims and the city of Milwaukee, and that he and his doctors believed his criminal behavior had been motivated by mental disorders. Dahmer added that this medical knowledge had given him "some peace", and that although he understood that society would never forgive him, he hoped God would. Dahmer closed his statement with: "I know my time in prison will be terrible, but I deserve whatever I get because of what I have done. Thank you, your honor, and I am prepared for your sentence, which I know will be the maximum. I ask for no consideration." He then returned to his seat to await formal sentencing.

Dahmer was then sentenced to life imprisonment plus ten years upon the first two counts. The remaining thirteen counts carried a mandatory sentence of life imprisonment plus seventy years. The death penalty was not an option for Judge Gram to consider at the penalty phase, as Wisconsin had abolished capital punishment in 1853.

Upon hearing of Dahmer's sentencing, his father Lionel and stepmother Shari requested to be allowed a ten-minute private meeting with their son before he was transferred to the Columbia Correctional Institution in Portage, to begin his sentence. This request was granted, and the trio exchanged hugs and well-wishes before Dahmer was escorted away.

Three months after his conviction in Milwaukee, Dahmer was extradited to Ohio to the Lorain Correctional Institution in Grafton, Ohio to be tried for the murder of his first victim, Steven Hicks. In a court hearing lasting just 45 minutes, Dahmer again pleaded guilty to the charges and was sentenced to a 16th term of life imprisonment on May 1, 1992. (Note: The State of Ohio had reinstated the death penalty in 1974; this law had been declared unconstitutional by the time of Hicks's 1978 murder. As such, Dahmer was not liable to face the death penalty for this offense. Ohio would formally reinstate the death penalty in 1981.)

== Imprisonment ==
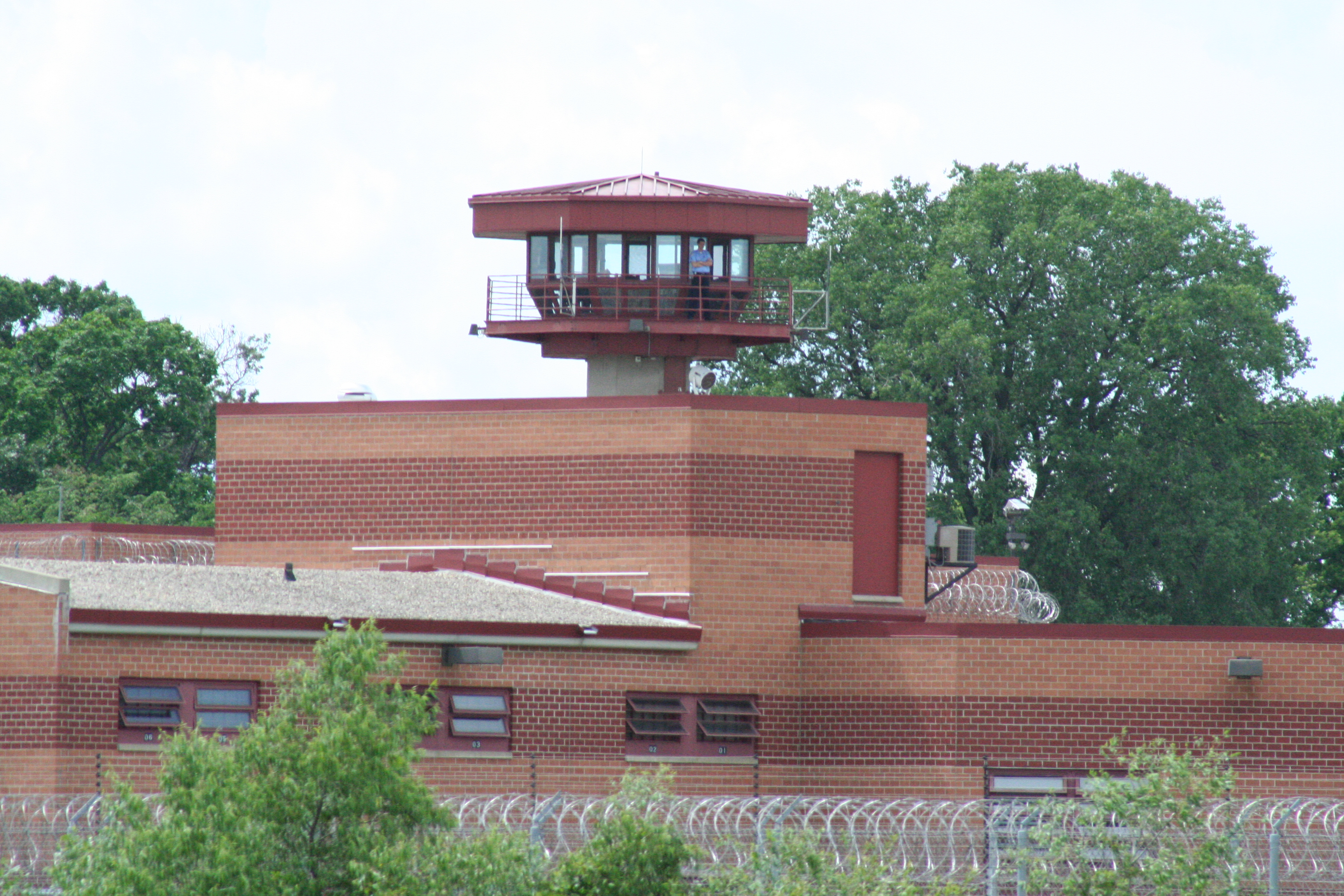
The Columbia Correctional Institution. Dahmer was imprisoned at this facility until his death in 1994.

Upon sentencing, Dahmer was transferred to the Columbia Correctional Institution. For the first year of his incarceration, Dahmer was placed in solitary confinement due to concerns for his physical safety should he come into contact with fellow inmates. He received ample correspondence from individuals across the world, with several individuals donating money which he spent on items such as cassette recordings, stationery, cigarettes, and magazines. Upon Dahmer's request, after one year in solitary confinement, he was transferred to a less secure unit, where he was assigned a two-hour daily work detail cleaning the toilet block. This work detail later expanded to include cleaning the prison gymnasium.

Shortly after completing his lengthy confessions in 1991, Dahmer had requested to Detective Murphy that he be given a copy of the Bible. This request was granted and Dahmer gradually devoted himself to Christianity and became a born-again Christian. On his father's urging, he also read creationist books from the Institute for Creation Research. In May 1994, Dahmer was baptized by Roy Ratcliff, a minister in the Church of Christ and a graduate of Oklahoma Christian University whom he had met on April 20. This service was conducted in the prison whirlpool.

Following Dahmer's baptism, Ratcliff visited him every week. The two regularly discussed the prospect of death, and Ratcliff later divulged that, in the months prior to his murder, Dahmer had questioned whether he was sinning against God by continuing to live. Referring to his crimes in a 1994 interview with Stone Phillips on Dateline NBC, Dahmer had stated: "If a person doesn't think that there is a God to be accountable to, then what's the point of trying to modify your behavior to keep it within acceptable ranges? That's how I thought anyway."

On July 3, 1994, a fellow inmate, Osvaldo Durruthy, attempted to slash Dahmer's throat with a razor embedded in a toothbrush as Dahmer sat in the prison chapel after the weekly church service was concluded. Dahmer received superficial wounds and was not seriously hurt in this incident. According to Dahmer's family, he had long been ready to die, and accepted any punishment which he might endure in prison. In addition to his father and stepmother maintaining regular contact, Dahmer's mother, Joyce, also maintained regular contact with her son. Prior to his arrest, the two had not seen each other since Christmas 1983. Joyce related that in her weekly phone calls, whenever she expressed concerns for her son's physical well-being, Dahmer responded with comments to the effect of: "It doesn't matter, Mom. I don't care if something happens to me."

== Death ==
On the morning of November 28, 1994, Dahmer left his cell to conduct his assigned work detail. Accompanying him were two fellow inmates, Jesse Anderson and Christopher Scarver. The trio were left unsupervised in the showers of the prison gym for approximately 20 minutes. At approximately 8:10 a.m. Dahmer was discovered on the floor of the bathrooms of the gym with extreme head wounds; he had been severely bludgeoned about the head and face with a 20-inch (51-centimeter) metal bar. His head had also been repeatedly struck against the wall in the assault. Although Dahmer was still alive and was rushed to a nearby hospital, he was pronounced dead one hour later. Anderson had been beaten with the same instrument; he died from his wounds two days later.

Scarver, who was serving a life sentence for a murder committed in 1990, informed authorities he had first attacked Dahmer with the metal bar as Dahmer was cleaning a staff locker room, before attacking Anderson as Anderson cleaned an inmate locker room. According to Scarver, Dahmer did not yell or make any noise as he was attacked. Immediately after attacking both men, Scarver, who was thought to be schizophrenic, returned to his cell and informed a prison guard: "God told me to do it. Jesse Anderson and Jeffrey Dahmer are dead." Scarver was adamant he had not planned the attacks in advance, although he later divulged to investigators he had concealed the 20-inch iron bar used to kill both men in his clothing shortly before the killings. (Note: Prior to murdering Dahmer and Anderson, Scarver had repeatedly expressed extreme racism towards white people. As the majority of Dahmer's victims were black and Anderson had attempted to frame two black men for his wife's murder, a possibility exists the attacks on both men were racially motivated.) According to Scarver, Dahmer's final words were: "I don't care if I live or die. Go ahead and kill me."

Upon learning of his death, Dahmer's mother Joyce responded angrily to the media: "Now is everybody happy? Now that he's bludgeoned to death, is that good enough for everyone?" The response of the families of Dahmer's victims was mixed: some celebrated the news, while others were saddened. Catherine Lacy, the mother of victim Oliver Lacy, remarked: "The hurt is worse now, because he's not suffering like we are." The district attorney who prosecuted Dahmer cautioned against turning Scarver into a folk hero, emphasizing that Dahmer's death was still murder. On May 15, 1995, Scarver was sentenced to two additional terms of life imprisonment for the murders of Dahmer and Anderson.

Dahmer had stated in his will that he wished for no services to be conducted and that he wished to be cremated. In September 1995, Dahmer's body was cremated, and his ashes divided between his parents. Owing to a disagreement between his parents as to whether Dahmer's brain should be retained for medical research, this organ was initially retained, but later cremated in December 1995.

=== Aftermath ===
On August 5, 1991, as the nature and scale of Dahmer's crimes initially came to light, a candlelight vigil to celebrate and heal the Milwaukee community was attended by more than 400 people. Present at the vigil were community leaders, gay rights activists, and family members of several of Dahmer's victims. Organizers stated the purpose of the vigil was to enable Milwaukeeans to "share their feelings of pain and anger over what happened".

Dahmer's murders were committed at a time of heightened racial tension in Milwaukee. A professor of community studies at the University of Wisconsin–Milwaukee, Walter Farrell, later stated race relations in the city had been "in a state of disrepair for nearly a decade" at the time of Dahmer's arrest. (Note: A 1989 study conducted at the University of Chicago had listed Milwaukee as one of five "hypersegregated" cities in the United States.) In an August 1991 interview given to the Christian Science Monitor, Farrell stated that news of the murders, as well as the conduct of Milwaukee police officers John Balcerzak and Joseph Gabrish with regards to victim Konerak Sinthasomphone, exacerbated and highlighted racial tensions within the city.

Milwaukee's gay scene was generally underground and transient in nature at the time of Dahmer's murders, with many sexually active gay men using aliases. Many in the city's gay community were nervous of the intentions of others after the extent of Dahmer's murders became known, although the fear and distrust generated by Dahmer's crimes was short-lived. As the 1990s progressed, the usage of aliases became less common among members of Milwaukee's gay community.

The Oxford Apartments at 924 North 25th Street, where Dahmer had killed twelve of his victims, were demolished in November 1992. The site is now a vacant lot. Alternate plans to convert the site into either a memorial garden, a playground, or to reconstruct new housing have failed to materialize.

Dahmer's estate was awarded to the families of eleven of his victims who had sued for damages. In 1996, Thomas Jacobson, a lawyer representing eight of the families, announced a planned auction of Dahmer's estate. Although victims' relatives stated the motivation was not greed, the announcement sparked controversy. A civic group, Milwaukee Civic Pride, was quickly established in an effort to raise the funds to purchase and destroy many of Dahmer's possessions. (Note: Several of Dahmer's possessions unrelated to his crimes such as items of furniture were retrieved by his father shortly after Dahmer's sentencing.) The group pledged $407,225, including a $100,000 gift by Milwaukee real estate developer Joseph Zilber, for purchase of Dahmer's estate; five of the eight families represented by Jacobson agreed to the terms, and Dahmer's possessions were subsequently destroyed and buried in an undisclosed Illinois landfill.

In 1995, the father of victim Jeremiah Weinberger filed a lawsuit against Dahmer's parole officer Donna Chester, alleging that Chester had failed to visit Dahmer's apartment as required while Dahmer was on probation, that she had failed to note Dahmer's deteriorating mental state and thus the likelihood of his re-engaging in criminal behavior, and had made no attempts to seek counseling for him. As such, Weinberger contended his son's death was due to the negligence of Chester and the Wisconsin Department of Health and Social Services. This lawsuit was dismissed in September 1995.

In 1994, Lionel published a book, A Father's Story, and donated a portion of the proceeds from his book to the victims' families. Most of the families showed support for Lionel and Shari, although three families subsequently sued Lionel: two for using their names in the book without obtaining prior consent, and a third family—that of Steven Hicks—filing a wrongful death suit against Lionel, Shari, and former wife Joyce, citing parental negligence as the cause for the claim.

Lionel Dahmer lived with his second wife, Shari, until her death in January 2023. He died of natural causes on December 5, 2023. Both refused to change their surname and professed their love of Dahmer in spite of his crimes.

Joyce Flint died of cancer on November 27, 2000. Prior to her death, she had attempted suicide on at least one occasion. Dahmer's younger brother, David, changed his surname and lives in anonymity.

== Victims ==
Jeffrey Dahmer killed seventeen young men between 1978 and 1991. Twelve were killed in his North 25th Street apartment. Three victims were murdered and dismembered at his grandmother's West Allis residence. His first and second victims were murdered at his parents' home in Ohio and at the Ambassador Hotel in Milwaukee, respectively. A total of fourteen of Dahmer's victims were from various ethnic minority backgrounds, with nine victims being black. Dahmer was adamant that the race of his victims was incidental to him and that it was the body form of a potential victim that attracted his attention. (Note: Despite Dahmer's insistence the race of his victims was incidental to him, some theorize the majority of his murders may have held a racial motive. Alternatively, his victim selection may have simply been a result of his living in an ethnically mixed area, and the demographics of the districts of Milwaukee and Chicago where he typically selected his victims.) These contentions have been supported via an independent forensic specialists' study of Dahmer's victim selection, the anthropological analysis of which revealed his victims shared a "morphological similarity" and suggesting Dahmer was "psychologically attracted to a certain anthropometric body type".

Most of Dahmer's victims were killed by strangulation after being drugged with sedatives. His first victim was killed by a combination of bludgeoning and strangulation and his second victim was battered to death, with one further victim killed in 1990, Ernest Miller, dying of a combination of shock and blood loss due to his carotid artery being cut. Four of Dahmer's victims killed in 1991 had holes bored into their skulls through which Dahmer injected hydrochloric acid or, later, boiling water, into their frontal lobes in an attempt to induce a permanent, submissive, unresistant state. These injuries proved fatal, although on each occasion, death was not Dahmer's intention.

=== 1978 ===
- June 18: Steven Mark Hicks, 18. Last seen hitchhiking to a rock concert in Chippewa Lake Park in Bath, Ohio. By Dahmer's admission, Hicks caught his attention because he was bare-chested. Dahmer bludgeoned him with a dumbbell and strangled him to death with this instrument before he dismembered the corpse. He then pulverized Hicks's bones with a hammer and scattered them in woodland behind the Dahmer family home.

=== 1987 ===
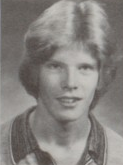
Steven Walter Tuomi

- November 20: Steven Walter Tuomi, 25. Killed in a rented room at the Ambassador Hotel in Milwaukee. Dahmer claimed to have no memory of murdering Tuomi, yet stated he must have battered him to death in a drunken stupor. His body was dismembered in the basement of Dahmer's grandmother's house and the remains discarded in the trash. No remains were ever found.

=== 1988 ===
- January 16: James Edward Doxtator, 14. Dahmer encountered Doxtator at a bus stop outside a gay bar in Wisconsin and lured him to West Allis on the pretext of paying him $50 to pose for nude pictures. Dahmer strangled Doxtator and kept his body in the basement for a week before dismembering him and discarding the remains in the trash.
- March 24: Richard Guerrero, 22. Drugged and strangled in Dahmer's bedroom at West Allis. Dahmer dismembered Guerrero's corpse in the basement, dissolved the flesh in acid and disposed of the bones in the trash. He bleached and retained the skull for several months before disposing of it. No remains were ever found.

=== 1989 ===
- March 25: Anthony Lee Sears, 24. Sears was the last victim whom Dahmer drugged and strangled at his grandmother's residence; he was also the first victim from whom Dahmer permanently retained any body parts. His preserved skull and genitals were found in a filing cabinet at 924 North 25th Street following Dahmer's arrest in 1991.

=== 1990 ===
- May 20: Raymond Lamont Smith (also known as Ricky Beeks), 32. The first victim to be killed at Dahmer's North 25th Street apartment. Smith was a male sex worker whom Dahmer encountered at a tavern. Dahmer gave Smith a drink laced with sleeping pills, then strangled him on his kitchen floor. His skull was spray-painted and retained.
- June 14: Edward Warren Smith, 27. A known acquaintance of Dahmer who was last seen in his company at a party. Dahmer acidified Smith's skeleton; his skull was destroyed unintentionally when placed in the oven in an effort to remove moisture. No remains were ever found.
- September 2: Ernest Marquez Miller, 22. Miller was a dance student whom Dahmer encountered outside a bookstore. According to Dahmer, he was especially attracted to Miller's physique. He was killed by having his carotid artery severed before being dismembered in the bathtub, with Dahmer storing his entire skeleton in the bottom drawer of a filing cabinet and his heart, liver, biceps, and portions of his thighs in the freezer for later consumption.
- September 24: David Courtney Thomas, 22. Encountered Dahmer near the Grand Avenue Mall; he was lured to Dahmer's apartment on the promise of money for posing nude. Once a laced drink had rendered Thomas unconscious, Dahmer decided he "wasn't my type". Nonetheless, Dahmer strangled Thomas, taking Polaroid photos of the dismemberment process. No remains were ever found.

=== 1991 ===
- February 18: Curtis Durrell Straughter, 17. Approached by Dahmer as he waited at a bus stop near Marquette University. Dahmer lured Straughter to his apartment, where he drugged, handcuffed and strangled him before dismembering his body in the bathtub. He retained Straughter's skull, hands, and genitals.
- April 7: Errol Lindsey, 19. The first victim upon whom Dahmer practiced what he later described to investigators as his "drilling technique", a procedure in which he drilled holes into the victim's skull, through which he injected hydrochloric acid into the brain. According to Dahmer, Lindsey awoke after this practice, after which he was again rendered unconscious with a drink laced with sedatives, then strangled to death. Dahmer flayed Lindsey's body and retained the skin for several weeks. His skull was found following Dahmer's arrest.

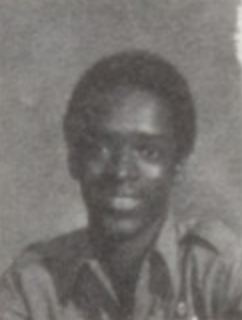
Tony Anthony Hughes

- May 24: Tony Anthony Hughes, 31. Hughes was lured by Dahmer to his apartment upon the promise of posing nude for photographs. As Hughes was deaf, he and Dahmer communicated using handwritten notes. (Note: Hughes was also able to communicate via lip reading.) The injection of hydrochloric acid into Hughes's skull proved fatal. His body was left on Dahmer's bedroom floor for three days before being dismembered, with Dahmer photographing the dismemberment process. His skull was retained and identified from dental records.
- May 27: Konerak Sinthasomphone, 14. The younger brother of the boy Dahmer had molested in 1988. Dahmer drugged Sinthasomphone and injected hydrochloric acid into his brain before leaving him unattended as he left the apartment to purchase beer. When he returned, he discovered Sinthasomphone naked and disoriented in the street, with three distressed young women attempting to assist him. When police arrived, Dahmer persuaded them he and Sinthasomphone were lovers and that Sinthasomphone was simply intoxicated. When police left Sinthasomphone with Dahmer in his apartment, Dahmer again injected hydrochloric acid into Sinthasomphone's brain, and this proved fatal. He kept Sinthasomphone's head in the freezer and dismembered his body.
- June 30: Matt Cleveland Turner, 20. On June 30, Dahmer attended the Chicago Pride Parade. At a bus stop, he encountered a 20-year-old named Matt Turner and persuaded him to accompany him to Milwaukee to pose for a photo shoot. Turner was drugged, strangled, and then dismembered in the bathtub. His head and internal organs were put in the freezer and his torso subsequently placed in the 57-gallon drum Dahmer purchased on July 12.
- July 5: Jeremiah Benjamin Weinberger, 23. Dahmer met him at a gay bar in Chicago and persuaded him to accompany him to Milwaukee for the weekend. Dahmer drilled through Weinberger's skull and injected boiling water into the cavity. He later recalled Weinberger's death to be exceptional, as he was the only victim who died with his eyes open. He kept Weinberger's decapitated body in the bathtub for a week before dismembered; his torso was placed in the 57-gallon drum.
- July 15: Oliver Joseph Lacy, 24. A bodybuilding enthusiast whom Dahmer enticed to his apartment with the promise of money for posing for photographs. Lacy was drugged and strangled with a leather strap before being decapitated, with his head and heart being placed in the refrigerator. His skeleton was retained to adorn one side of the private shrine of skulls and skeletons Dahmer was in the process of creating when arrested one week later.
- July 19: Joseph Arthur Bradehoft, 25. Dahmer's last victim. Bradehoft was a father of three children from Minnesota who was looking for work in Milwaukee at the time of his murder. Dahmer left Bradehoft's body on his bed for two days before decapitating his corpse. His severed head was placed in the refrigerator and his torso within the 57-gallon drum.

== In media ==
=== Film ===
- The Secret Life: Jeffrey Dahmer was released in 1993. Directed by David Bowen, this biographical crime drama stars Carl Crew as Dahmer.
- The biographical film Dahmer was released in 2002. It stars Jeremy Renner in the title role and co-stars Bruce Davison as Dahmer's father, Lionel.
- The drama film Raising Jeffrey Dahmer was released in 2006. Revolving around the reactions of Dahmer's parents following his arrest in 1991, Raising Jeffrey Dahmer stars Rusty Sneary as Dahmer and co-stars Scott Cordes as Lionel.
- In 2012, an independent documentary, The Jeffrey Dahmer Files, premiered at the South by Southwest festival. It features interviews with Dahmer's former neighbor, Pamela Bass, as well as Detective Patrick Kennedy, and the city medical examiner Jeffrey Jentzen.
- The Marc Meyers–directed film, My Friend Dahmer, premiered at the Tribeca Film Festival on April 25, 2017. Based on the graphic novel by John Backderf, the film stars Ross Lynch as Dahmer and chronicles his high school years and the events leading up to his first murder.

=== Books ===
- Backderf, Derf (2012). My Friend Dahmer. New York City: Abrams Books. ISBN 978-1-419-70216-7.
- Berry-Dee, Christopher (2022). Inside the Mind of Jeffrey Dahmer: The Cannibal Killer. London: Ad Lib Publishers Limited. ISBN 978-1-913-54331-0.
- Dahmer, Lionel (1994). A Father's Story. New York: William Morrow and Company. ISBN 978-0-688-12156-3.
- Dvorchak, Robert J.; Holewa, Lisa (1992). Milwaukee Massacre: Jeffrey Dahmer and the Milwaukee Murders. London: Hale Publishing. ISBN 978-0-7090-5003-2.
- Ewing, Charles Patrick; McCann, Joseph T. (2006). Minds on Trial: Great Cases in Law and Psychology. Oxford, England: Oxford University Press. ISBN 978-0-19-518176-0.
- Haycock, Dean A. (2014). Murderous Minds: Exploring the Criminal Psychopathic Brain: Neurological Imaging and the Manifestation of Evil. Winnipeg: Pegasus Publications. ISBN 978-1-60598-498-8.
- Ratcliff, Roy; Adams, Lindy (2006). Dark Journey, Deep Grace: Jeffrey Dahmer's Story of Faith. Abilene, Texas: Leafwood Publishers. ISBN 978-0-9767790-2-5.
- Rosewood, Jack (2017). Jeffrey Dahmer: A Terrifying True Story of Rape, Murder and Cannibalism. Wyoming: LAK Publishing. ISBN 978-1-6484505-5-6.

=== Television ===
- The Trial of Jeffrey Dahmer was released in 1992. Directed by Elkan Allan, this documentary largely focuses upon testimony delivered at Dahmer's first trial. The documentary concludes with Dahmer's addressing Judge Laurence Gram following his conviction.
- Dahmer: Mystery of a Serial Killer. Directed by Michael Husain and released in November 1993, this 50-minute A&E Networks documentary contains archive footage of Dahmer's trial in addition to interviews with individuals such as forensic psychiatrist Park Dietz.
- Inside Edition conducted an interview with Dahmer in January 1993. Conducted by reporter Nancy Glass, this 30-minute interview was broadcast in February 1993.
- ABC News commissioned a one-hour episode focusing upon Dahmer's crimes as part of their television news magazine series Day One. This episode features interviews with forensic psychiatrist Park Dietz and psychiatrist Fred Berlin and was first broadcast in April 1993.
- Channel 4 commissioned a documentary focusing on the murders committed by Jeffrey Dahmer. Titled To Kill and Kill Again, this 50-minute documentary was first broadcast on December 12, 1993.
- Dateline NBC broadcast an interview with Dahmer. Conducted by Stone Phillips and first broadcast on March 8, 1994, this 90-minute episode—titled Confessions of a Serial Killer—features interviews with Dahmer and his father conducted at Columbia Correctional Institution. Dahmer's mother is also interviewed for this program.
- The BBC broadcast a documentary focusing on the life and crimes of Jeffrey Dahmer. Titled Everyman: Profile of a Serial Killer and directed by Nikki Stockley, this 50-minute documentary was first broadcast in November 1994.
- A&E Networks commissioned a second documentary focusing upon the murders committed by Jeffrey Dahmer. Titled Jeffrey Dahmer: The Monster Within, this 50-minute episode was first broadcast in June 1996 and contains interviews with Detective Patrick Kennedy and Prosecutor Michael McCann.
- The British true crime series Born to Kill? broadcast an episode focusing upon Jeffrey Dahmer. This 45-minute episode features interviews with FBI criminal profiler Robert Ressler and Detective Patrick Kennedy and was first broadcast in October 2005.
- The Investigation Discovery channel broadcast a documentary focusing upon Dahmer within its documentary series, Most Evil. This documentary features excerpts of Dahmer's 1994 Dateline NBC interview with Stone Phillips and was first broadcast in August 2006.
- HLN broadcast an episode focusing upon Dahmer's crimes as part of its investigative series, How it Really Happened. This episode, titled The Strange Case of Jeffrey Dahmer, originally aired on March 31, 2017.
- The digital cable and satellite television channel Oxygen broadcast the two-part documentary Dahmer on Dahmer: A Serial Killer Speaks in November 2017. Produced and directed by Matthew Watts, the program features interviews with, among others, Dahmer's father, stepmother, former classmates, psychiatrists who testified at his trial, and a homicide detective involved in the investigation.

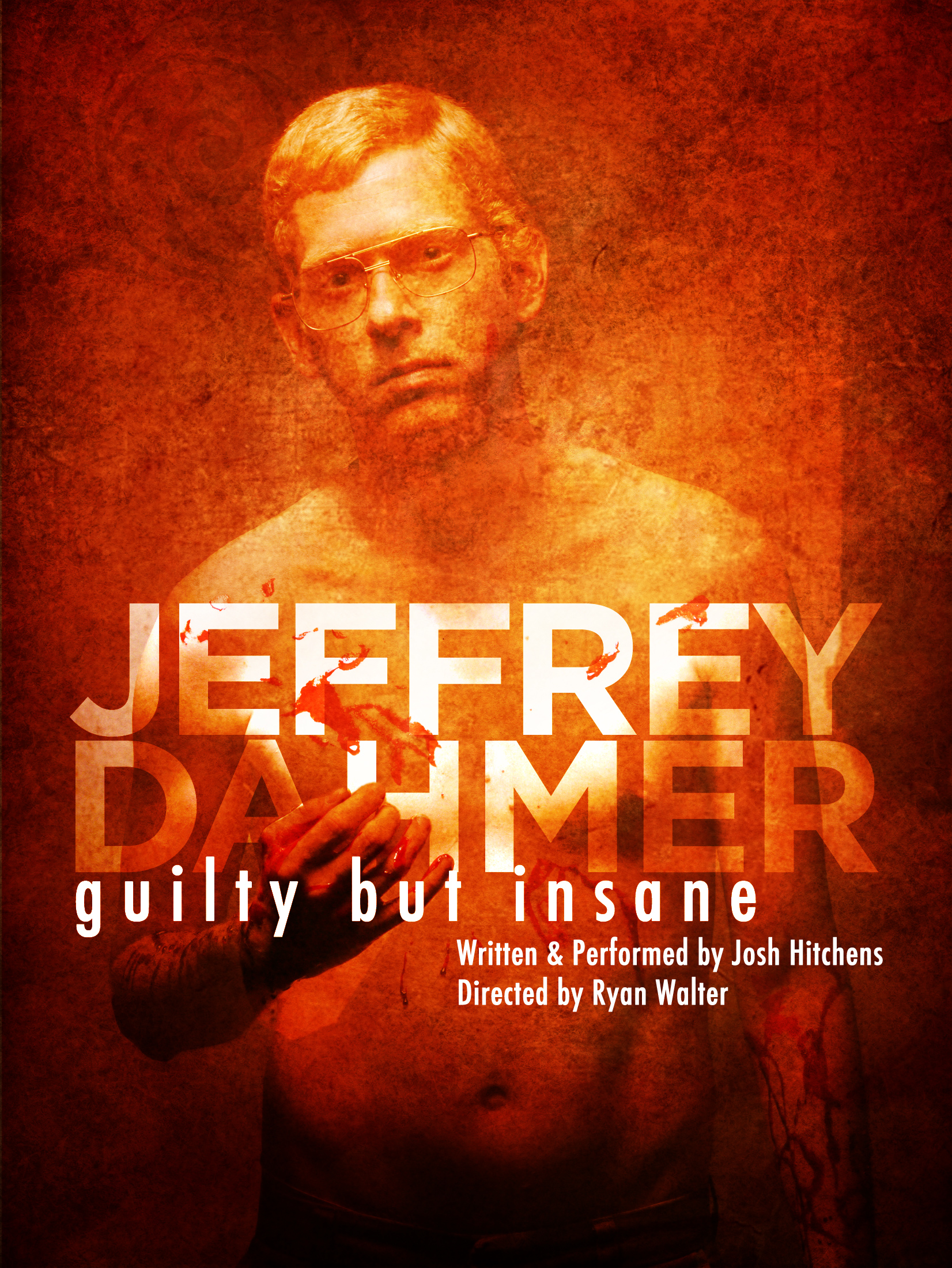
Poster for the theatrical play Jeffrey Dahmer: Guilty but Insane

- The Netflix dark tourism documentary series Dark Tourist broadcast an episode which analyzed Dahmer's crimes. This 40-minute documentary was first broadcast on July 20, 2018.
- Jeffrey Dahmer: Mind of a Monster was commissioned by the Investigation Discovery channel. This documentary was first broadcast in May 2020 and includes interviews with Dahmer's father, former neighbors and eyewitnesses in addition to investigators and forensic psychiatrists.
- Dahmer – Monster: The Jeffrey Dahmer Story. A 10-part biographical crime drama series that was commissioned by Netflix and released on September 21, 2022. Evan Peters portrayed Dahmer.
- Conversations with a Killer: The Jeffrey Dahmer Tapes. Commissioned by Netflix and directed by Joe Berlinger, this series includes previously unreleased recordings of conversations between Dahmer and his attorneys. The first of this three-part series was broadcast on October 7, 2022.
- My Son Jeffrey: The Dahmer Family Tapes. A four-part documentary which includes previously unreleased recordings of conversations between Dahmer and his father following his conviction. Directed by Benedict Adams, this documentary was first broadcast in September 2023.

=== Theater ===
- The Law of Remains (1992) by experimental writer and director Reza Abdoh uses the techniques of Artaud's Theatre of Cruelty to depict Dahmer's life and crimes.
- Jeffrey Dahmer: Guilty but Insane (2013). Written and performed by Joshua Hitchens and directed by Ryan Walter.

== See also ==
- Incidents of necrophilia
- List of homicides in Wisconsin
- List of incidents of cannibalism
- List of serial killers by number of victims
- List of serial killers in the United States

== Bibliography ==
- Aggrawal, Anil (2016). Necrophilia: Forensic and Medico-legal Aspects. Boca Raton, Florida: CRC Press. ISBN 978-1-4200-8913-4.
- Asante, Molefi (2003). Erasing Racism: The Survival of the American Nation. New York: Prometheus Books. ISBN 978-1-615-92527-8.
- Campbell, Duncan (ed.). "Murder in Mind – Jeffrey Dahmer the Milwaukee serial killer". Murder in Mind (5). London, England: Marshall Cavendish. ISSN 1364-5803.
- Dahmer, Lionel (1994). A Father's Story. New York City: William Morrow. ISBN 978-0-688-12156-3.
- Davis, Don (1991). The Jeffrey Dahmer Story: An American Nightmare. New York City: Macmillan. ISBN 978-0-312-92840-7.
- Dvorchak, Robert J.; Holewa, Lisa (1992). Milwaukee Massacre: Jeffrey Dahmer and the Milwaukee Murders. New York City: Dell Publishing. ISBN 978-0-7090-5003-2. Archived from the original on April 12, 2023.
- Ellens, J. Harold (2011). Explaining Evil, Volume 1. Santa Barbara, California: Bloomsbury Publishing. ISBN 978-0-313-38715-9. Archived from the original on February 5, 2016.
- Ewing, Charles Patrick; McCann, Joseph T. (2006). Minds on Trial: Great Cases in Law and Psychology. Oxford, England: Oxford University Press. ISBN 978-0-19-518176-0.
- Fido, Martin (1995). Twentieth-Century Murder. London: Bracken. ISBN 978-1-858-91390-2.
- Freyd, Jennifer; Birrell, Pamela (2013). Blind to Betrayal: Why We Fool Ourselves We Aren't Being Fooled. Nashville, Tennessee: Turner Publishing Company. ISBN 978-0-470-60440-3.
- Fulero, Solomon M.; Wrightsman, Lawrence Samuel (2008). Forensic Psychology. Boston, Massachusetts: Cengage Learning. ISBN 978-0-495-50649-2.
- Gadd, David; Jefferson, Tony (2007). Psychosocial Criminology: An Introduction. London: Sage Publishing. ISBN 978-1-446-23482-2.
- Giannangelo, Stephen J. (2012). Real-Life Monsters: A Psychological Examination of the Serial Murderer. Santa Barbara, California: ABC-CLIO. ISBN 978-0-313-39784-4.
- Haycock, Dean A. (2014). Murderous Minds: Exploring the Criminal Psychopathic Brain: Neurological Imaging and the Manifestation of Evil. New York City: Pegasus Books. ISBN 978-1-60598-498-8.
- Kerekes, David (2005). Creeping Flesh: The Horror Fantasy Film Book. London: Headpress Books. ISBN 978-1-900-48645-3.
- Klotsche, Charles (1995). The Silent Victims: The Aftermath of Failed Children on Their Mothers' Lives. New York: Pan American Press. ISBN 978-0-967-38902-8.
- MacDonald, Alzena (2013). Murders and Acquisitions: Representations of the Serial Killer in Popular Culture. New York: Bloomsbury Books. ISBN 978-1-441-17702-5.
- Masters, Brian (1993). The Shrine of Jeffrey Dahmer. London, England: Hodder & Stoughton. ISBN 978-0-340-59194-9.
- Norris, Joel (1992). Jeffrey Dahmer. London, England: Constable & Robinson. ISBN 978-0-09-472060-2. Archived from the original on April 12, 2023.
- Petherick, Wayne; Turvey, Brent E.; Ferguson, Claire E. (2009). Forensic Criminology. Amsterdam: Elsevier. ISBN 978-0-123-75071-6.
- Purcell, Catherine; Arrigo, Bruce (2006). The Psychology of Lust Murder: Paraphilia, Sexual Killing and Sexual Homicide. Amsterdam: Elsevier. ISBN 978-0-123-70510-5.
- Ratcliff, Roy; Adams, Lindy (2006). Dark Journey, Deep Grace: Jeffrey Dahmer's Story of Faith. Abilene, Texas: Leafwood Publishing. ISBN 978-0-9767790-2-5.
- Ressler, Robert; Shachtman, Tom (1997). I Have Lived in the Monster: A Report from the Abyss. New York City: St. Martin's Press. ISBN 978-0-312-15552-0.
- Reznek, Lawrie (1997). Evil or Ill? Justifying the Insanity Defence. London: Routledge. ISBN 978-0-415-16700-0.
- Roy, Jody M. (2002). Love to Hate: America's Obsession with Hatred and Violence. New York City: Columbia University Press. ISBN 978-0-231-12569-7.
- Sanders, John (1995). "Dahmer: How He was Killed". Killers. No. 6. London, England: Nexus Media. ISSN 1358-8516.
- Schwartz, Anne E. (1992). The Man Who Could Not Kill Enough. New York City: Citadel. ISBN 978-1-55972-117-2.
- Schildcrout, Jordan (2014). Murder Most Queer: The Homicidal Homosexual in the American Theater. Ann Arbor, Michigan: University of Michigan Press. ISBN 978-0-472-05232-5.
- Toushin, Steven (2006). The Destruction of the Moral Fabric of America. London: Wells Street Publishing. ISBN 978-1-884-76004-4.
- Wilson, Colin; Wilson, Damon (2006). The World's Most Evil Murderers. Bath, England: Parragon Books Ltd. ISBN 978-1-405-48828-0.
- Wynn, Douglas (1996). On Trial for Murder: Over 200 of the Most Dramatic Trials of the 20th Century. London: Pan Books. ISBN 0-330-33947-8.
