= Columbia Correctional Institution (Wisconsin) =

Maximum-security prison in Portage, Wisconsin, United States

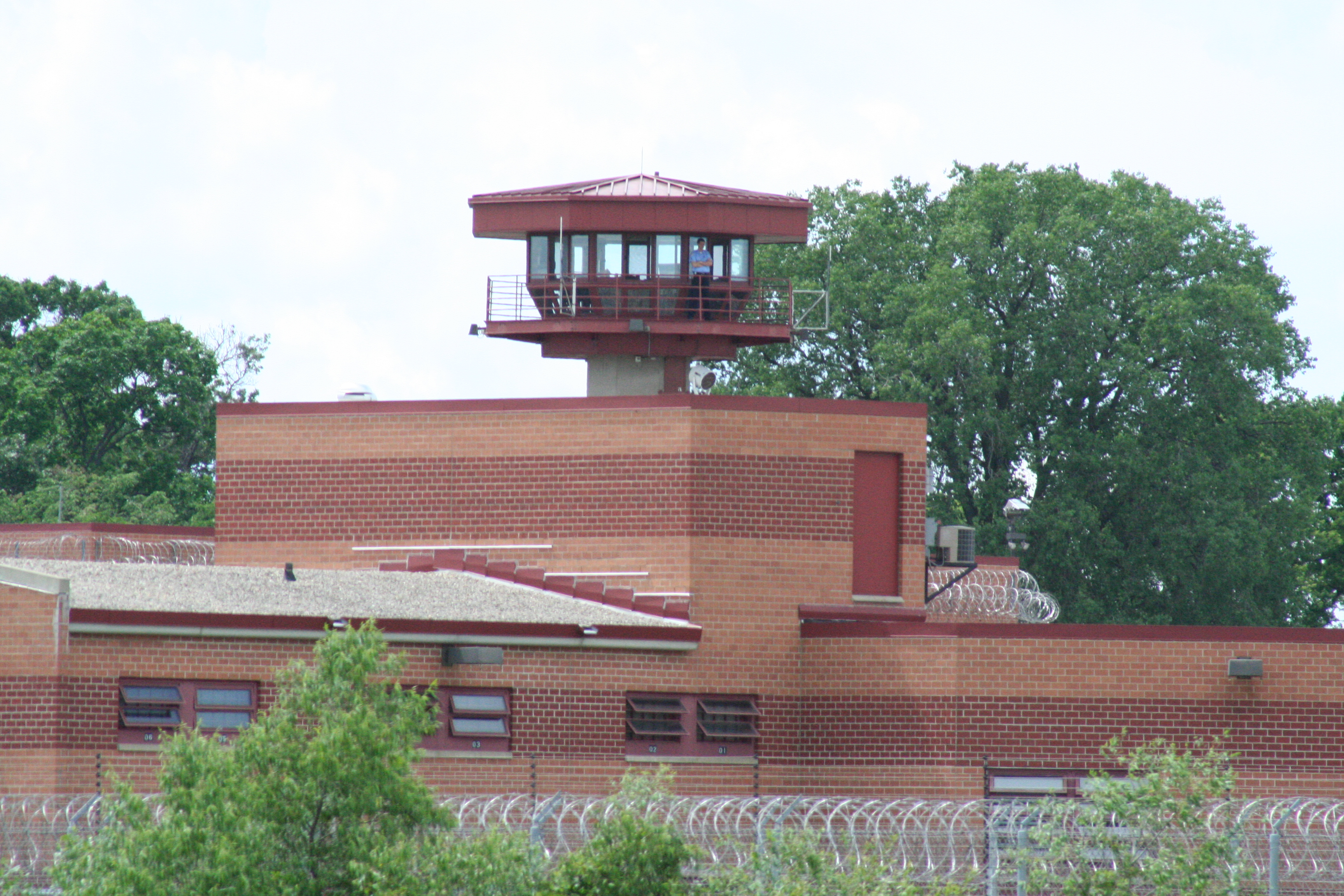
- Interactive map of Columbia Correctional Institution
- Location: Portage, Wisconsin, U.S.; 43°33′56″N 89°29′31″W
- Status: Operational
- Security class: Maximum
- Capacity: 541 males (operating)
- Population: 832 males (FY 2012)
- Opened: May 1986
- Managed by: Wisconsin Department of Corrections; Division of Adult Institutions
- Director: Larry Fuchs

The Columbia Correctional Institution (CCI) is an adult male maximum-security correctional facility operated by the Wisconsin Department of Corrections Division of Adult Institutions in Portage, Wisconsin. The operating capacity is 541. The average daily population for the fiscal year 2018 was 830. Larry Fuchs, the warden, has been in that position since April 2020.

== History ==
The facility was constructed on 110 acres (45 ha) at a cost of $38.6 million. It has an area of 27 acres (11 ha) inside the perimeter fence. Columbia Correctional Institution opened in May 1986, with an original capacity of 450 inmates housed in single bed cells. In 1997, a 150-bed barracks was constructed for minimum security inmates and over time many of the single bed cells have been converted to double bed cells.

In 1988, a sculpture entitled Chromatic Fragments—Vortex to the Sky by artist and University of Illinois Professor of Art Christiane Martens was installed in the parking area of the prison. The 20-foot (6.1 m) tall painted steel sculpture cost $50,000.

In 2007, a female staff member was accused of having sex with inmates at the prison. She pleaded no contest to a lesser charge. In 2008, a female corrections officer was charged with multiple counts of second degree sexual assault. The use of force was not alleged in either situation, but Wisconsin law does not allow prisoners to consent to sex with prison staff. Punishment can be up to 40 years in prison, and a large fine.

In 2020, two inmates escaped from the maximum security portion of the prison. James Newman and Thomas Deering both used clothing and yoga mats to scale the two 45-foot (14 m) high security fences. While one of the security fences was supposed to be an electric "Stun Fence", it was not operational at the time. In addition all but one of the five watch towers meant to watch the fence were unmanned at the time of the escape. Both inmates managed to make it over both fences and make it all the way to Illinois before being captured.

== Buildings and grounds ==
Columbia Correctional Institution's location in Wisconsin

CCI has 12 total housing units, 6 general population, 2 SMU (Special Management Unit [psych]), 2 segregation (plus one housing unit is half for SMU seg and reception and orientation houses min/med security seg if not put to DS2 or DS1), 1 × 150 bed barracks, 1 × 13 cell R&O (Reception & Orientation). The facility is stated to have ten living areas with 50 cells each and a 150-bed barracks.

== High-profile inmates ==
Some notorious individuals who have been incarcerated at CCI include:

- Filemon Amaro, Waukesha County courtroom shootout in 1978 that killed two sheriff's deputies.

=== Murdered ===
- Jesse Anderson (1957–1994), murderer; beaten to death
- Jeffrey Dahmer (1960–1994), serial killer; beaten to death

=== Current ===
- Joseph Hunter, contract killer

=== Former ===
- Brendan Dassey (born 1989) is an American convicted murderer.
- James Oswald, Convicted of a crime spree in the mid-1990s that included kidnapping, bank robberies, wounding two officers and killing Waukesha police captain James Lutz
- Christopher Scarver (born 1969), convicted murderer who while in prison killed Jeffrey Dahmer and Jesse Anderson

== See also ==
- List of Wisconsin state prisons
