= Christopher Scarver =

American murderer (born 1969)

- Mugshot in 1992
- Born: Christopher J. Scarver; July 6, 1969 (age 57); Milwaukee, Wisconsin, U.S.
- Known for: Murdering Jeffrey Dahmer and Jesse Anderson
- Children: 1
- Status: Incarcerated at Centennial Correctional Facility, Colorado
- Motive: Robbery (murder of Lohman); Vigilantism (murders of Dahmer and Anderson)
- Conviction: First degree intentional homicide (3 counts)
- Penalty: Life imprisonment without the possibility of parole

Details
- Date: June 1, 1990 (Steve Lohman); November 28, 1994 (Jeffrey Dahmer and Jesse Anderson)
- Country: United States
- State: Wisconsin
- Killed: 3

Christopher J. Scarver Sr. (born July 6, 1969) is an American convicted murderer who is known for the 1994 murders of his fellow inmates Jeffrey Dahmer and Jesse Anderson, both convicted murderers, at the Columbia Correctional Institution in Wisconsin. He remains incarcerated in Colorado.

== Early life ==
Scarver is the second of five children and was born and raised in Milwaukee, Wisconsin. He attended James Madison High School before dropping out in the eleventh grade. Shortly after, Scarver was hired as a trainee carpenter in a Wisconsin Conservation Corps job program. He said that his supervisor, Edward Patts, promised that upon completion of this one-year program he would be hired full-time. After Patts was dismissed, Scarver did not gain a full-time job there and lost his traineeship in January 1990.

Afterwards, Scarver began drinking and smoking heavily, consuming three 40 oz. bottles of malt liquor and four marijuana cigarettes each day. Scarver later told his psychiatrist that he believed the corps had rejected him due to racial discrimination. When he was forced to move out of his mother's home after his girlfriend became pregnant, Scarver began planning vengeance against the carpenter site.

Scarver stated at his first murder trial that he began hearing the voices of a family while drunk, calling him "the chosen one" and "the son of God". Scarver came to believe he was Jesus Christ, further reasoning that they were both carpenters, had a mother named Mary and a similar first name, signing documents with the signature "Christ". He was later diagnosed with schizophrenia and described as having messianic delusions.

== Murder of Steve Lohman ==
On June 1, 1990, Scarver went to the Wisconsin Conservation Corps training office and found site manager John Feyen and 27-year-old Steve Lohman, a visiting carpenter crew chief from Superior, present. Forcing Lohman down at gunpoint with a .25 caliber semiautomatic pistol, Scarver demanded money from Feyen. Upon receiving only US$15 from him (equivalent to $37 in 2025), the enraged Scarver shot Lohman once in the head, killing him. According to authorities, Scarver said: "Now do you think I'm kidding? I need more money." Feyen wrote Scarver a check for US$3,000 (equivalent to $7,393 in 2025), with Scarver firing into Lohman's head again, stating "This is still not enough". As Feyen was in the process of retrieving his paycheck roll, Scarver shot Lohman's body a third time. When Feyen handed over his car keys, wallet, credit cards, and the paychecks, Scarver asked if Feyen believed in God. Feyen answered yes and expected to be killed as well, but upon noticing that Scarver had not immediately shot him, Feyen knocked the gun out of Scarver's hand and ran away. It is sometimes reported that Scarver shot Lohman's body a fourth time before fleeing the scene. Police arrested Scarver a few hours later at his girlfriend's apartment, still in possession of the gun and the stolen items, with Scarver stating that he had planned to turn himself in.

On June 5, 1990, Scarver was charged with first-degree intentional homicide while armed, attempted first-degree homicide while armed and armed robbery. He pled not guilty by reason of mental disease or defect, after which psychiatrists disagreed whether he was fit to stand trial. A police officer who arrested Scarver testified that he had planned on turning himself in since he understood that what he was doing was morally wrong. Prosecutors also argued that Scarver's repeated post-mortem shooting of Lohman's body was a deliberate scare tactic to intimidate Feyen into giving him more money. During psychiatric evaluations at a state-run mental facility in July 1991, Scarver voiced his belief that he was being targeted by a government conspiracy for his skin color, which he blamed for the loss of his traineeship and his murder trial, acting hostile with white orderlies while referring to black staff members as "traitors". A psychiatrist described Scarver's delusions of persecution as a means of denying responsibility for his crimes.

On April 13, 1992, the Milwaukee County Circuit Court convicted Scarver of the murder of Steve Lohman at a jury trial and sentenced to life in prison, with an additional 20-year sentence for the attempted murder of John Feyen. He was incarcerated at the Columbia Correctional Institution in Portage, Wisconsin. Scarver was originally not eligible for parole until April 13, 2037, which was later pushed back to 2042.

== Murders of Jeffrey Dahmer and Jesse Anderson ==
Two years later, on the morning of November 28, 1994, Scarver was assigned to a work detail in the gymnasium with two other inmates: Jesse Anderson, convicted for murdering his wife; and Jeffrey Dahmer, a serial killer. When corrections officers left the three unsupervised, a confrontation ensued. Scarver went out and retrieved a metal bar from the weight room, which he used to bludgeon Dahmer. He then attacked Anderson with a wooden stick at the showers. He returned to his cell and informed a corrections officer "God told me to do it. Jesse Anderson and Jeffrey Dahmer are dead."

Both men were mortally wounded by the beatings. Dahmer was declared dead an hour after arriving at the hospital. Anderson died two days later after doctors removed him from life support.

Scarver was assessed for mental illness and found competent to stand trial on murder charges for the two killings. He changed his "not guilty" plea to "no contest" in exchange for being transferred to a federal penitentiary, was convicted of each murder, and received two more life sentences. When asked if he believed his sentence was just, Scarver was quoted as having said "Nothing white people do to blacks is just."

=== Aftermath ===
In 1995, Scarver was transferred into the custody of the Federal Bureau of Prisons under the register number #08157-045. At the time, prison officials in Wisconsin believed they did not have a facility secure enough to house Scarver. Scarver underwent psychiatric evaluation again at the MCFP Springfield and was later transferred to ADX Florence, the federal supermax in Florence, Colorado, where he remained until 2000.

In 2000, Scarver was transferred to the Wisconsin Secure Program Facility when it opened. In 2001, federal district court judge Barbara Crabb ordered that Scarver and about three dozen other seriously mentally ill inmates be relocated from the Wisconsin facility. Scarver was eventually relocated to the Centennial Correctional Facility in Colorado.

In 2005, Scarver brought a federal civil rights suit against officials of the Wisconsin Secure Program Facility arguing that he had been subjected to cruel and unusual punishment, contrary to his constitutional rights. A district court judge dismissed the suit against several of the defendants and ruled that the actions of the remaining officials could not be considered unlawful. Scarver unsuccessfully appealed the decision in 2006. Scarver would later say that he had been held for 16 years in solitary confinement as a result of the murders of Dahmer and Anderson.

In 2012, an agent representing Scarver announced that he was willing to write a tell-all book about the murder of Dahmer.

== See also ==
- List of homicides in Wisconsin
