= John Balcerzak =

Former police officer (born 1957)

- Born: 1957 (age 68–69)
- Occupation: Police officer
- Years active: 1980–1991, 1994–2017
- Known for: Konerak Sinthasomphone incident

President of Milwaukee Police Association
- In office c. 2006 – December 31, 2009
- Preceded by: Bradley DeBraska

John A. Balcerzak (born 1957) is an American former police officer from Milwaukee, Wisconsin.

Balcerzak and Joseph T. Gabrish gained national attention in 1993, when they were suspended with pay and later fired for having handed over an injured 14-year-old boy to serial killer Jeffrey Dahmer despite bystanders' protests, as well as for the homophobic remarks made by the officers during the incident.

The officers appealed their termination and were subsequently reinstated with back pay of $55,000 each by Judge Robert J. Parins. Balcerzak served as president of the Milwaukee Police Association (the police union for Milwaukee officers) from 2005 to 2009. Balcerzak retired from the Milwaukee Police Department in 2017.

== Jeffrey Dahmer incident ==
Three women, Sandra Smith, Tina Spivey and Nicole Childress, discovered the victim, 14-year-old Konerak Sinthasomphone, after he had managed to escape from Jeffrey Dahmer's apartment, naked, bruised, bleeding from his anus and heavily under the influence of drugs. Childress called 9-1-1 and Balcerzak, Joseph T. Gabrish, and Richard Porubcan responded, along with a fire department ambulance. Ambulance personnel thought Sinthasomphone needed treatment but were sent away by the officers. Though the Laotian immigrant had been in the country for ten years and spoke English fluently, in his drugged and brain-injured state, he was unable to communicate his situation to authorities or to the three women. Dahmer convinced the police that the boy was his 19-year-old lover against the protests of the three women.

Smith recognized the boy from the neighborhood and the three women reiterated their concerns but were told to "shut the hell up" by the officers, who were convinced the incident was a domestic dispute. The three officers returned Sinthasomphone to Dahmer's apartment. Balcerzak said he smelled nothing unusual but Gabrish said he did detect a foul odor, likely emanating from the body of Anthony "Tony" Hughes, who had been murdered by Dahmer three days earlier. The officers listed the incident as a "domestic squabble between homosexuals" and did not otherwise act. Approximately ten minutes after the police left, Glenda Cleveland, Childress's aunt and Smith's mother, called police and was connected with Balcerzak, who dismissed her concern and declined to take the names of her niece and daughter as witnesses. Within an hour, Dahmer murdered Sinthasomphone by strangling him, performed oral sex upon his corpse, and dismembered him. For the murders of Sinthasomphone and 15 others from 1978 to 1991, Dahmer would be sentenced to 16 consecutive terms of life imprisonment without parole in 1992.

In the aftermath of Dahmer's arrest, an audiotape of Balcerzak and Gabrish making homophobic statements to their dispatcher and cracking jokes about having reunited the "lovers" caused heavy criticism. They were fired while Porubcan was put on job probation for one year. By failing to check Dahmer's identification, the officers did not learn that he was a sex offender with a 1988 child molestation conviction where the victim was Sinthasomphone's older brother, who was 13 at the time. Milwaukee later paid the boy's family a sum of $850,000 to settle a lawsuit over police handling of the situation.

Both officers appealed their termination. Judge Robert J. Parins controversially ruled in favor of the officers and they were reinstated in June 1994.

== Service as union official ==
In May 2005, Balcerzak was elected president of the Milwaukee Police Association, defeating Sebastian Raclaw by a vote of 521 to 453. As president, he was criticized for failing to protect officers from mandatory overtime and not supporting African-American officer Alfonzo Glover, who was charged with homicide on May 30, 2006, and later died by suicide on the same day. By June 2006, the union vice president had resigned because of disagreements with Balcerzak's "leadership style". A petition to remove Balcerzak was filed and a recall election was held in August 2006. The results were 213 for a recall and 397 to retain him. At an October 9, 2009, trustee election, Balcerzak was not re-elected as a trustee and vacated his position as president on December 31, 2009.

== Cited works ==
- Masters, Brian (1993). The Shrine of Jeffrey Dahmer. London: Hodder & Stoughton. ISBN 978-0-340-59194-9.
