= Marc Meyers =

American film director

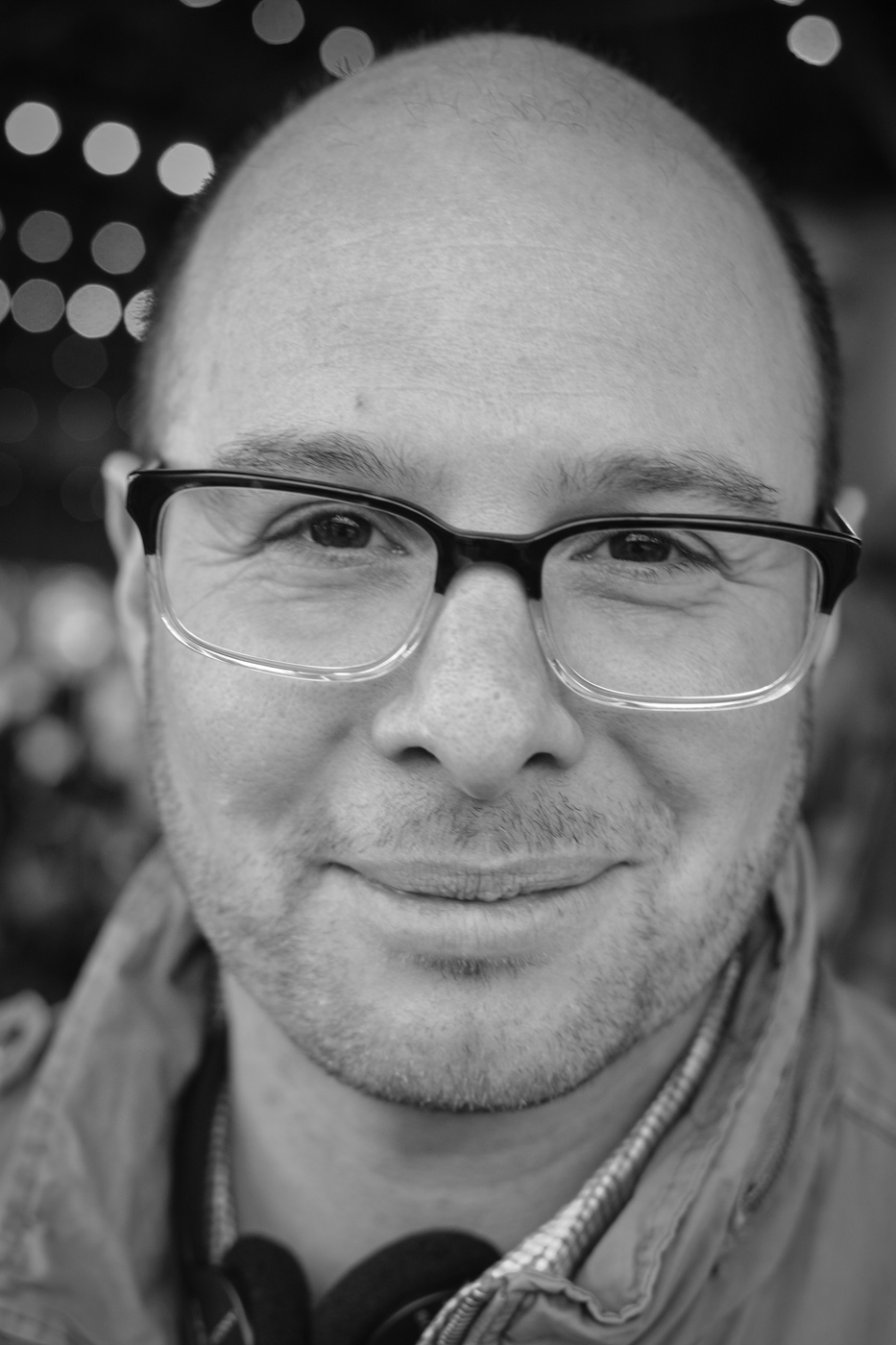

Marc Meyers is an American feature film director and screenwriter. He is best known for his fourth feature film My Friend Dahmer and the previous How He Fell in Love.

== Early life and education ==
Meyers is a 1994 graduate of Franklin & Marshall College, where he majored in English and studied abroad at Oxford University.

== Career ==
His first feature film was Approaching Union Square. Based on his stage monologues, this debut is a collage of eleven tales capturing thirty-something New Yorkers struggling to find love and connection in the big city. Among the elegantly drawn characters whose lives briefly intersect on a New York City bus are a tourist, an immigrant, a sex addict, and a woman who is newly awakened to her own psychic powers and senses imminent tragedy. The film had its International Premiere at the Montreal World Film Festival. Variety wrote, "thought-provoking... touches with skilled insight. Based on his stage work 'Love & Sex: Tales From the Trenches', reps a fine calling card for a clear, even voice in urban angst." It aired on Sundance Channel.

Meyers then went on to write and direct the New York Times Critics Pick Harvest, starring Robert Loggia, Barbara Barrie, Jack Carpenter, Victoria Clark, Arye Gross, and Peter Friedman. The film portrays three generations of the Italian-American Monopoli family who come together one summer around the eventual passing of their patriarch, a WWII veteran. Gathered at the family home and around their beautiful shoreline town in Madison, Connecticut, years of resentment and betrayal within the family surface, and the grandson, a college-aged student, does his part to hold them all together, growing up in the process. Winner of the Best Narrative Feature Award at various American film festivals, it had a limited theatrical release in 2011. Then it aired on Showtime.

Meyers's third feature How He Fell in Love premiered at the LA Film Fest in 2015. The film revolves around Travis, a young struggling musician, who crosses paths with Ellen at a wedding. She's an older married yoga teacher who is trying to adopt a child with her husband. Travis and Ellen begin an affair that slowly deepens into something more intimate and profound. As their encounters continue, Ellen is confronted with her failing marriage while Travis must face the consequences of his actions. The film stars Matt McGorry, Amy Hargreaves, Britne Oldford, and Mark Blum. It was theatrically released by Orion Pictures and Monument Releasing in the summer of 2016.

Meyers's fourth film, My Friend Dahmer, is based on the 2012 graphic novel of the same name by cartoonist John "Derf" Backderf, who had been friends with Jeffrey Dahmer in high school in the 1970s, soon before Dahmer began his killing spree. Dahmer is played by Ross Lynch, while Derf is played by Alex Wolff. The film premiered at the 2017 Tribeca Film Festival, and was theatrically released in the fall of 2017 in North America by FilmRise, followed by Altitude Films in UK, and other territories.
