= Andy McCollum =

American football player (born 1970)

No. 55, 67, 64
- Positions: Center, guard

Personal information
- Born: June 2, 1970 (age 56); Akron, Ohio, U.S.
- Listed height: 6 ft 4 in (1.93 m)
- Listed weight: 300 lb (136 kg)

Career information
- High school: Revere (Richfield, Ohio)
- College: Toledo
- NFL draft: 1993: undrafted

Career history
- Milwaukee Mustangs (1994); Cleveland Browns (1994)*; New Orleans Saints (1994–1998); → Barcelona Dragons (1995); St. Louis Rams (1999–2007); Detroit Lions (2008)
- * Offseason or practice squad member only

Awards and highlights
- Super Bowl champion (XXXIV); Second-team All-World League (1995); 2× First-team All-MAC (1991, 1992)

Career NFL statistics
- Games played: 199
- Games started: 159
- Fumble recoveries: 4
- Stats at Pro Football Reference

Andrew Jon McCollum (born June 2, 1970) is an American former professional football player who was a center for 15 seasons in the National Football League for three teams. He played college football at Toledo Rockets. He was signed by the Milwaukee Mustangs as a street free agent in 1994.

McCollum also played for the New Orleans Saints, St. Louis Rams, and Detroit Lions. He earned a Super Bowl ring with the Rams in Super Bowl XXXIV.

== Early life ==
McCollum attended Revere High School in Richfield, Ohio.

== New Orleans Saints ==
McCollum was a center and guard for the New Orleans Saints from 1994 to 1999.

== St. Louis Rams ==
In his first year with the Rams (1999), McCollum was a reserve offensive lineman of the winning team of Super Bowl XXXIV. McCollum took over from Mike Gruttadauria as the starting center for the St. Louis Rams in his second year with that team (2000), the first under first-time NFL head coach Mike Martz, their offensive coordinator of the previous year. Thanks to a strong offensive line of McCollum, guards Tom Nütten and Adam Timmerman, and tackles Orlando Pace and Ryan Tucker, the Rams won a wildcard playoff berth with a 10–6 won-lost record and 540 points scored (33.8 points per game, 1st in the NFL), but lost a wild card game of the 2000–01 NFL playoffs to the New Orleans Saints, despite Kurt Warner's 365 yards in the air, the offensive line allowing 2 sacks for 15 yards. The following year, the Rams' record was a powerful 14–2 and 503 points scored (31.4 points per game, 1st in the NFL), winning the west division title again. In the 2001–02 NFL playoffs with the same offensive line except for Rod Jones (offensive lineman) replacing Tucker at right tackle, St. Louis won the divisional round game against the Green Bay Packers and the NFC championship game against the Philadelphia Eagles with over 200 net passing yards in each game. However, the Rams lost Super Bowl XXXVI to the New England Patriots, despite 337 net passing yards. In 2002, Warner was injured for most of the year, replaced by Marc Bulger, less effective as the Rams missed the playoffs with a record of 7–9.

With Bulger as the new quarterback, and Warner in reserve, St. Louis came back strong in 2003 with a 12–4 record, 1st in the NFC West, and 447 points scored (27.9 points/game), 2nd in the NFL. However, in the 2003–04 NFL playoffs, the Rams lost to the Carolina Panthers in the divisional round, despite 316 net passing yards. In that game, as well as throughout the year, McCollum played left guard in place of the injured Nütten, with Dave Wohlabaugh at center. In 2004, with Bulger as the regular starter and McCollum back at center, the team was only 8–8, but still qualified for a wild card game in the 2004–05 NFL playoffs, beating the Seattle Seahawks with the same basic offensive line (McCollum at center, Nütten and Timmerman at guards, Pace and a new offensive right tackle, Blaine Saipaia. However, the Rams lost 47–17 in the divisional round to the Atlanta Falcons, as they could not control Michael Vick's running and passing. The Rams did not make the playoffs in McCollum's last three years with the team, up to 2007, when their record was a dismal 3–13.

McCollum started all 16 games for six years from 2000 to 2005, but played and started in one game in 2006 and started in 10 games in 2007. In 2006, he was replaced as the starting center by Richie Incognito. However, Incognito was injured through most of 2007, starting in four games, so McCollum returned briefly as the starter. In 2008, Incognito became the starting right guard, and Brett Romberg, among others, became the center.

== Detroit Lions ==
McCollum ended his career in 2008, starting in four games, playing in 12, for a Detroit Lions team that finished with a 0–16 record.
