= Pete Nance =

American basketball player (born 2000)

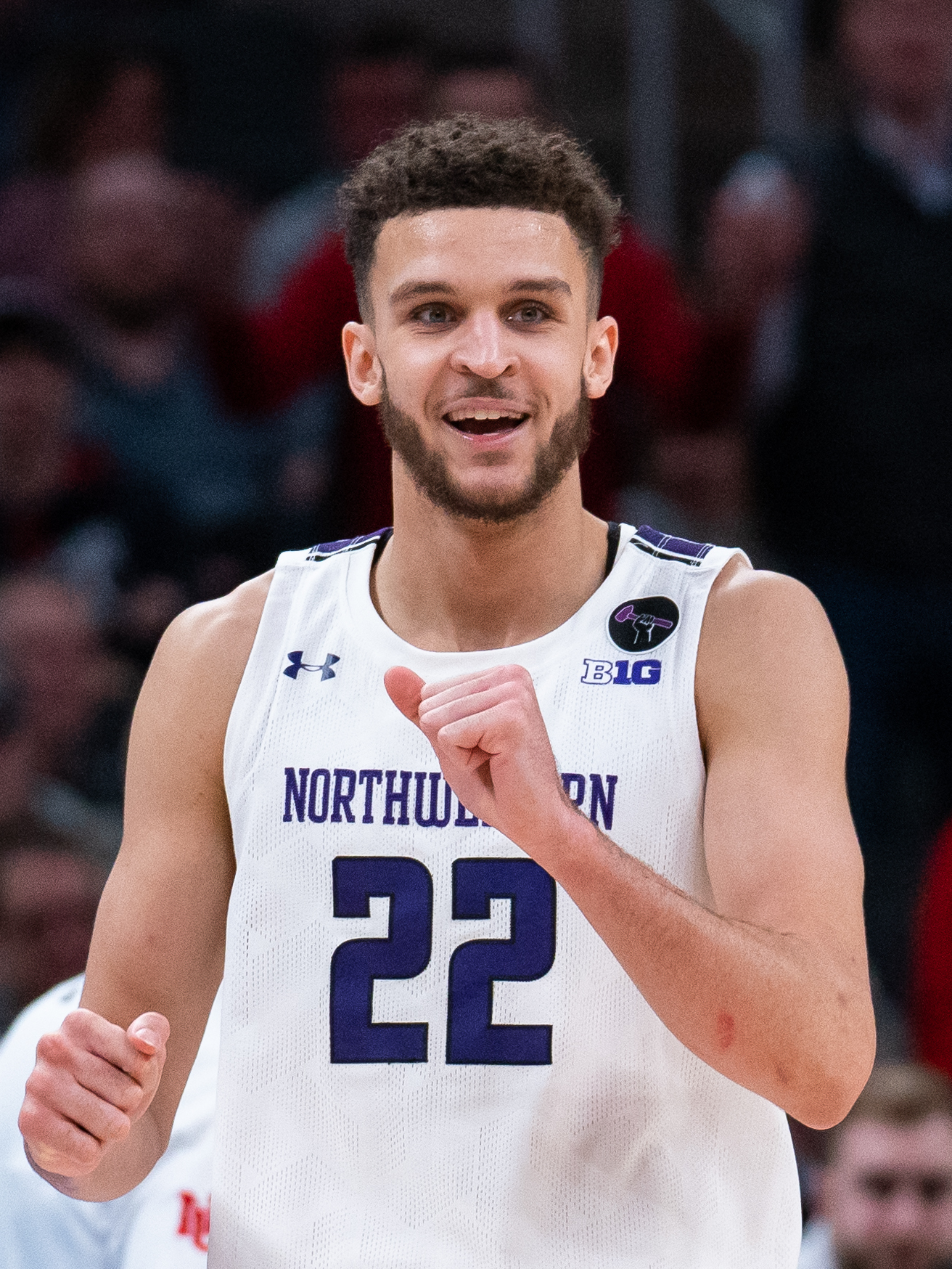
- Nance with Northwestern in 2022

No. 35 – Milwaukee Bucks
- Position: Power forward
- League: NBA

Personal information
- Born: February 19, 2000 (age 26) Akron, Ohio, U.S.
- Listed height: 6 ft 9 in (2.06 m)
- Listed weight: 225 lb (102 kg)

Career information
- High school: Revere (Richfield, Ohio)
- College: Northwestern (2018–2022); North Carolina (2022–2023)
- NBA draft: 2023: undrafted
- Playing career: 2023–present

Career history
- 2023–2025: Cleveland Charge
- 2024: Cleveland Cavaliers
- 2024: →Cleveland Charge
- 2024–2025: Philadelphia 76ers
- 2024–2025: →Delaware Blue Coats
- 2025: Cleveland Charge
- 2025: Philadelphia 76ers
- 2025: →Delaware Blue Coats
- 2025–present: Milwaukee Bucks
- 2025–present: →Wisconsin Herd
- Stats at NBA.com
- Stats at Basketball Reference

Peter Lucas Nance (born February 19, 2000), is an American professional basketball player for the Milwaukee Bucks of the National Basketball Association (NBA), on a two-way contract with the Wisconsin Herd of the NBA G League. He played college basketball for the Northwestern Wildcats and North Carolina Tar Heels. He has played in the NBA for the Cleveland Cavaliers and Philadelphia 76ers.

== High school career ==
Nance played at Revere High School. In his senior season, Nance was 6 feet 10 inches (2.08 m) tall and weighed 205 pounds (93 kg). That year, Nance led Revere to its first district championship, and he was named the Ohio Division II Player of the Year. On June 29, 2017, Nance committed to playing for Northwestern Wildcats men's basketball team starting in the 2018–19 season. In doing so, Nance declined offers from the University of Michigan and the Ohio State University. Nance was a four-star recruit and the highest-ranked recruit in program history. Scout.com ranked him as the 83rd-best overall player and the 19th-best power forward in the country. Meanwhile, 247Sports ranked him 64th overall.

== College career ==
=== Northwestern ===
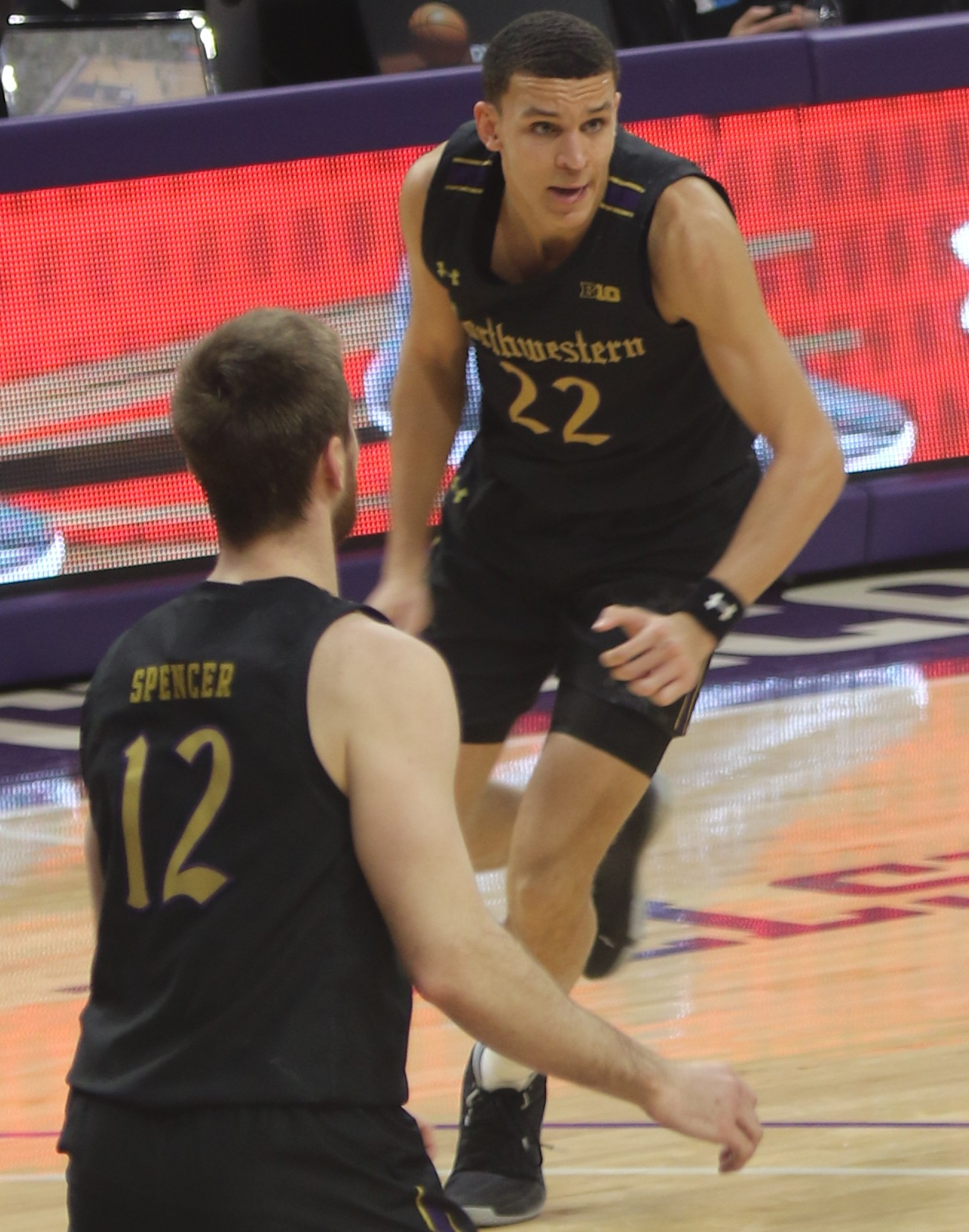
Nance for Northwestern on February 12, 2020

Nance debuted in an exhibition game against the McKendree Bearcats, during which he notched 12 points, eight rebounds, three blocks and four steals in 19 minutes off the bench. In his first regular-season college basketball game, Nance scored three points and provided one assist in a win against the New Orleans Privateers. Nance earned his first collegiate start in an 80–60 loss to the Michigan Wolverines. He averaged 8.5 points and 6.0 rebounds per game as a sophomore. As a junior, Nance averaged 11.1 points, 6.8 rebounds and 1.8 assists per game. He missed a game against Michigan State on January 15, 2022, due to an ankle injury.

Nance averaged 14.6 points and 6.5 rebounds per game as a senior. After testing the waters in the 2022 NBA draft, Nance ultimately returned to college and transferred to North Carolina.

=== North Carolina ===
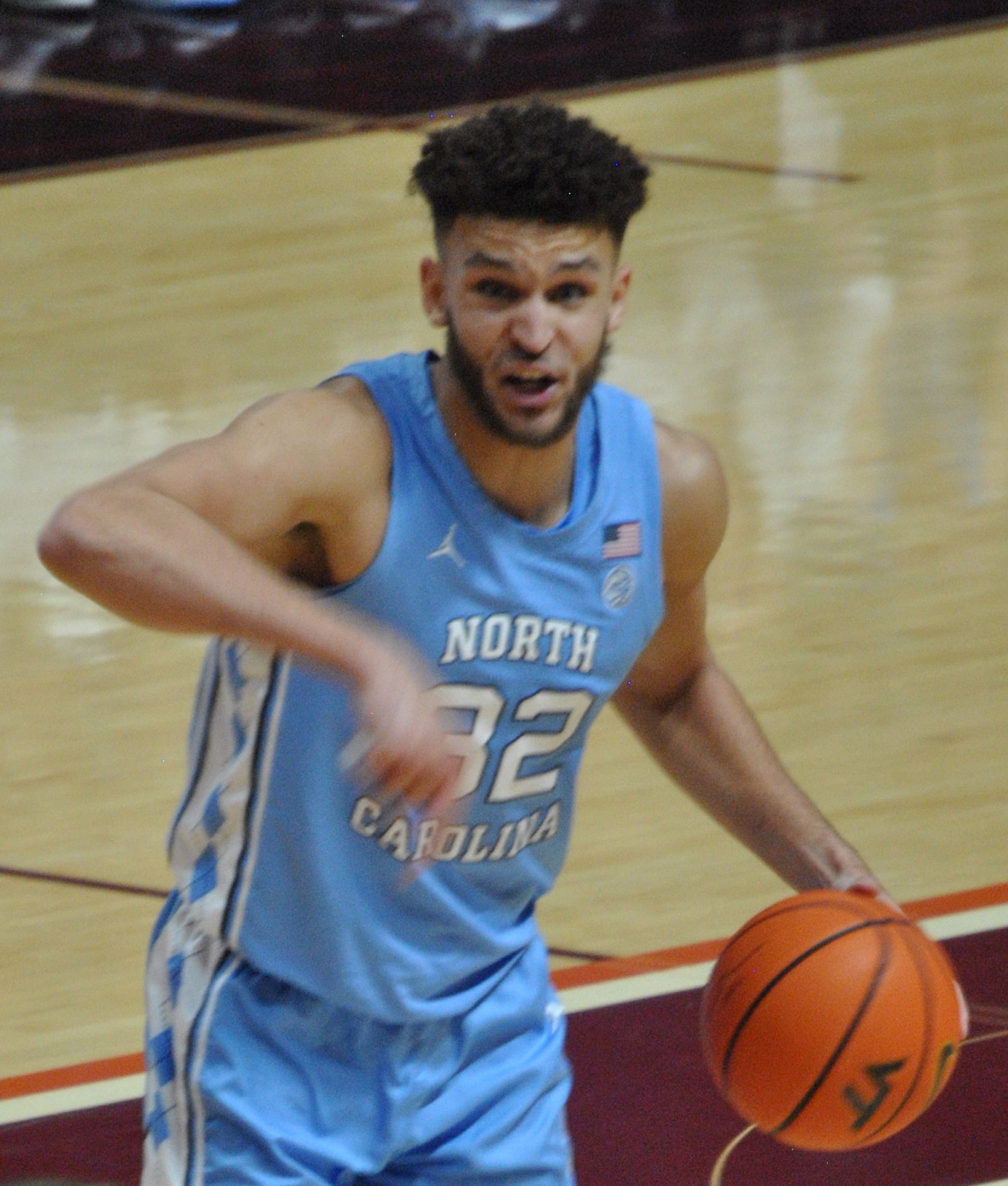
Nance with North Carolina in 2022

Nance transferred to North Carolina to play in his fifth collegiate season, joining a team that had been national runners-up the season prior. He was able to join the Tar Heels due to an NCAA rule granting all student-athletes an extra year of eligibility because of the COVID-19 pandemic shutting down sports at the end of the 2019–20 season. Immediately becoming a starter and a key part of the rotation, Nance and the Tar Heels struggled through an up-and-down season. Hampered by a nagging back injury that kept him out of a few games, Nance started all 30 games in which he played as a Tar Heel. He averaged 10 points and 6 rebounds per game, and shot 42% from the floor in his lone season in Chapel Hill.

== Professional career ==
=== Cleveland Charge (2023–2024) ===
After going undrafted in the 2023 NBA draft, Nance joined the Cleveland Cavaliers for the 2023 NBA Summer League and on September 13, 2023, he signed with the Cavaliers. However, he was waived on October 21 and one week later, signed with the Cleveland Charge of the NBA G League.

On January 18, 2024, Nance signed a 10-day contract with the Cleveland Cavaliers, making him the third member of the Nance family to play for the Cavaliers (after his father Larry and brother Larry Jr.). On January 30, he returned to the Cleveland Charge and on February 19, he signed a two-way contract with the Cavaliers.

=== Cleveland Cavaliers (2024) ===
On September 24, 2024, Nance signed a standard contract with the Cavaliers, but was waived on October 19. Seven days later, he re-joined the Charge.

=== Philadelphia 76ers (2024–2025) ===
On December 3, 2024, Nance signed a two-way contract with the Philadelphia 76ers. However, he was waived on January 7, 2025

=== Return to the Cleveland Charge (2025) ===
On January 10, 2025, Nance returned to the Cleveland Charge.

=== Return to Philadelphia (2025) ===
On January 14, he signed another two-way contract with Philadelphia.

On February 6, 2025, Nance was waived, as part of the Jared Butler trade.

=== Milwaukee Bucks (2025–present) ===
On February 28, 2025, Nance signed a two-way contract with the Milwaukee Bucks. He made six appearances (including one start) during the remainder of the year, averaging 3.8 points, 1.8 rebounds, and 1.2 assists.

On March 23, 2026, the Bucks converted Nance's two-way contract into a multiyear standard contract. Nance made 47 total appearances (including six starts) for Milwaukee in the 2025–26 NBA season, recording averages of 5.4 points, 2.7 rebounds, and 1.0 assists.

On July 3, 2026, the Bucks waived Nance before his salary for the 2026–27 season became fully guaranteed. On July 9, he re–signed with Milwaukee on a two–year contract.

On October 17, 2026, the Bucks waived Nance again, but re-signed him on a two-way contract two days later on October 19, 2026.

== Career statistics ==
Legend
GP	Games played	GS	Games started	MPG	Minutes per game
FG%	Field goal percentage	3P%	3-point field goal percentage	FT%	Free throw percentage
RPG	Rebounds per game	APG	Assists per game	SPG	Steals per game
BPG	Blocks per game	PPG	Points per game	**Bold**	Career high

=== NBA ===
Year	Team	GP	GS	MPG	FG%	3P%	FT%	RPG	APG	SPG	BPG	PPG
2023–24	Cleveland	8	0	3.4	.167	**1.000**	.000	.4	.0	.1	.0	.4
2024–25	Philadelphia	7	0	9.8	.333	.333	**.500**	1.4	.4	.1	.0	2.1
2024–25	Milwaukee	6	1	11.7	**.529**	.417	–	1.8	**1.2**	.2	**.3**	3.8
2025–26	Milwaukee	**47**	**6**	**15.7**	.515	.420	.364	**2.7**	1.0	**.3**	**.3**	**5.4**
Career		68	7	13.3	.496	.417	.333	2.2	.9	.3	.2	4.3

=== College ===
Year	Team	GP	GS	MPG	FG%	3P%	FT%	RPG	APG	SPG	BPG	PPG
2018–19	Northwestern	23	1	13.9	.347	.263	.417	1.7	.8	.3	.3	2.9
2019–20	Northwestern	**30**	20	26.2	.400	.297	.686	6.0	1.6	.3	1.0	8.5
2020–21	Northwestern	24	23	27.7	.495	.364	.784	**6.8**	1.8	**.6**	.7	11.1
2021–22	Northwestern	30	**30**	27.2	**.497**	**.452**	.768	6.5	**2.7**	.3	**1.1**	**14.6**
2022–23	North Carolina	30	30	**30.2**	.422	.320	**.816**	6.0	1.7	.3	**1.1**	10.0
Career		137	104	25.3	.449	.347	.759	5.5	1.7	.4	.9	9.7

== Personal life ==
Nance is the son of Larry Nance and the younger brother of Larry Nance Jr., both of whom have played in the National Basketball Association. He also has an older sister named Casey.
