= Revere Local School District =

School district in Ohio, United States

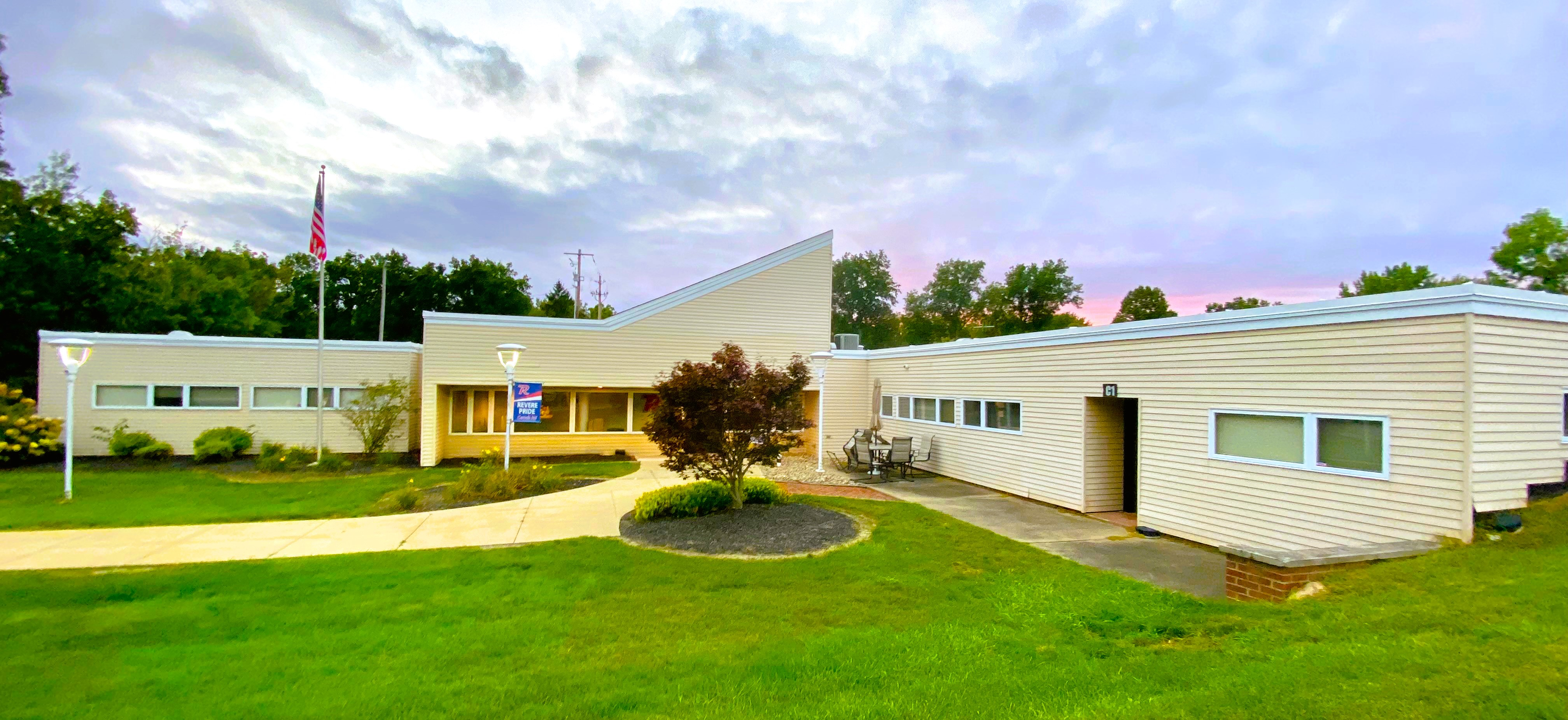
- Revere Local School District building

Address
- 3496 Everett Road Richfield, Ohio, 44286; United States

District information
- Type: Public
- Grades: PK–12
- Schools: 4
- NCES District ID: 3905005

Students and staff
- Students: 2,898 (2024–2025)
- Teachers: 156.00 (on an FTE basis) (2024–2025)
- Staff: 321.15 (on an FTE basis) (2024–2025)
- Student–teacher ratio: 18.58 (2024–2025)

Other information
- Website: www.revereschools.org

The Revere Local School District is a school district located in northeastern Ohio, between the cities of Akron and Cleveland, that was formed in the early 1950s after the communities of Bath and Richfield voted to combine their two smaller school systems. The District is broken up into four schools, Revere High School, Revere Middle School, Bath Elementary School, and Richfield Elementary School.

The household income in the area is significantly higher than both the state average and national average.

The Revere Local School District is in the process of building two new school buildings. One for the high school and another for the elementary grades 4–5. As well as renovations for the other facilities. The school is also ranked 21 in the state.

== Awards and achievements ==
The district has achieved an "Excellent" rating on the Ohio Department of Education's Local Report Card since this rating system was implemented in 2000.

== History ==
Early in 1949, discussions began between Bath and Richfield school districts regarding the consolidation of their two school districts. On October 11, 1949 there was an official vote to consolidate the two communities (Richfield 272 to 187 and Bath 258 to 79). On November 14, 1949, Summit County Board of Education officially recognized the new system and named it the “Bath Richfield Local School District.” In 1966, the Bath-Richfield School District school board voted to rename the district after the name of the high school and on July 1, 1967 it became “Revere Local School District.”

On February 28, 1950, voters approved a bond to build a new high school (Bath 387–109 and Richfield 184–259). It was defeated in Richfield, but in Bath residents had cast votes that carried the point for both communities. Following bond approval, the Bath-Richfield School Board supervised the purchase of 28 acres for the site of the new school at the intersection of Revere and Everett Roads. On October 5, 1950, the school board selected “Revere High School” as the name for the new school. The name was first suggested by long time teacher and coach Gordon E. Knapp based on the road the new school was being built on. On November 13, 1950, the students voted Red, White, and Blue as the district's colors and “Minutemen” was selected as the mascot based on the inspiration of the new high school name. The first year of consolidated high schools was in 1951. The school began construction in August 1951 (ground breaking was June 17, 1951). While the school was being built, high school students spent half a day at Bath School and half a day at Richfield School (9th and 10th graders at Richfield in the morning and Bath in the afternoon). On May 29, 1952 the first graduating class of Revere held their commencement in the Richfield School auditorium. On January 20, 1953, all high school students moved into the new school. The official dedication of the school occurred on March 21, 1954.

In that first year with students attending both schools, Carl Coffeen served as superintendent (he was County Superintendent) and Roy M. Pugh (former Bath School Principal) served as Revere's principal. The following year, 1952–53, Pugh served as the Superintendent with Harold C. Schweisberger (former principal at Richfield School) serving as Revere's principal. In 1953–54 Schweisberger took over as Superintendent (1953–1964) George H. Bayliss became Revere's principal (1954–1971). After the completion of the high school, 9–12 graders attended Revere High School while Bath and Richfield schools had K–8 grades—the community students lived in is the school they attended.

In 1957, Hillcrest School was added to be a 6–8 building and Bath and Richfield schools became K–5 buildings. In 1960 Eastview Junior High School (Revere Middle School) was added to be a 6- 8 building. Bath, Richfield, and Hillcrest schools all became K–5 buildings. In 1961 Eastview Junior High added freshmen and Revere High School became a 10–12 building while Bath, Richfield, and Hillcrest schools became K-6 buildings. In July 1970 a portion of the Revere District was transferred to the Highland Local School District. In 1975, freshmen returned to the high school and Eastview Junior High became a 7–8 building while Bath, Richfield, and Hillcrest schools remained K-6 buildings. In 1980, Hillcrest School became a primary building (K–2), and Richfield and Bath schools became elementary buildings (3–6) each serving the residents of their communities. In 1990, the district consolidated the kids from both communities and split the grades—Richfield School (3-4) and Bath School (5–6). In the early 1990s, the district was overcrowded with numerous classroom trailers at each building. It is at this time that initial conversations begin to occur about a Revere-Woodridge merger—consolidating with Woodridge High School which was also in need of increased facilities. The community quickly spoke out against the plan and a bond passed in November 1992 which did not include new schools but rather additions/improvements to the existing schools. In 1994 after completion of the additions due to the bond issue, third graders were sent to Hillcrest School making it a K–3 building. Sixth graders were sent to Revere Middle School (Eastview) making it a 6–8 building. Richfield was closed (except Summit Country Preschool was housed in the newer annex until 2009) and the property sold in 2012. On November 8, 2016 voters approved Issue 45 which provided funding to build a new high school, elementary school, and renovating-improving Hillcrest and the middle school.

== Richfield Elementary School ==
=== History ===
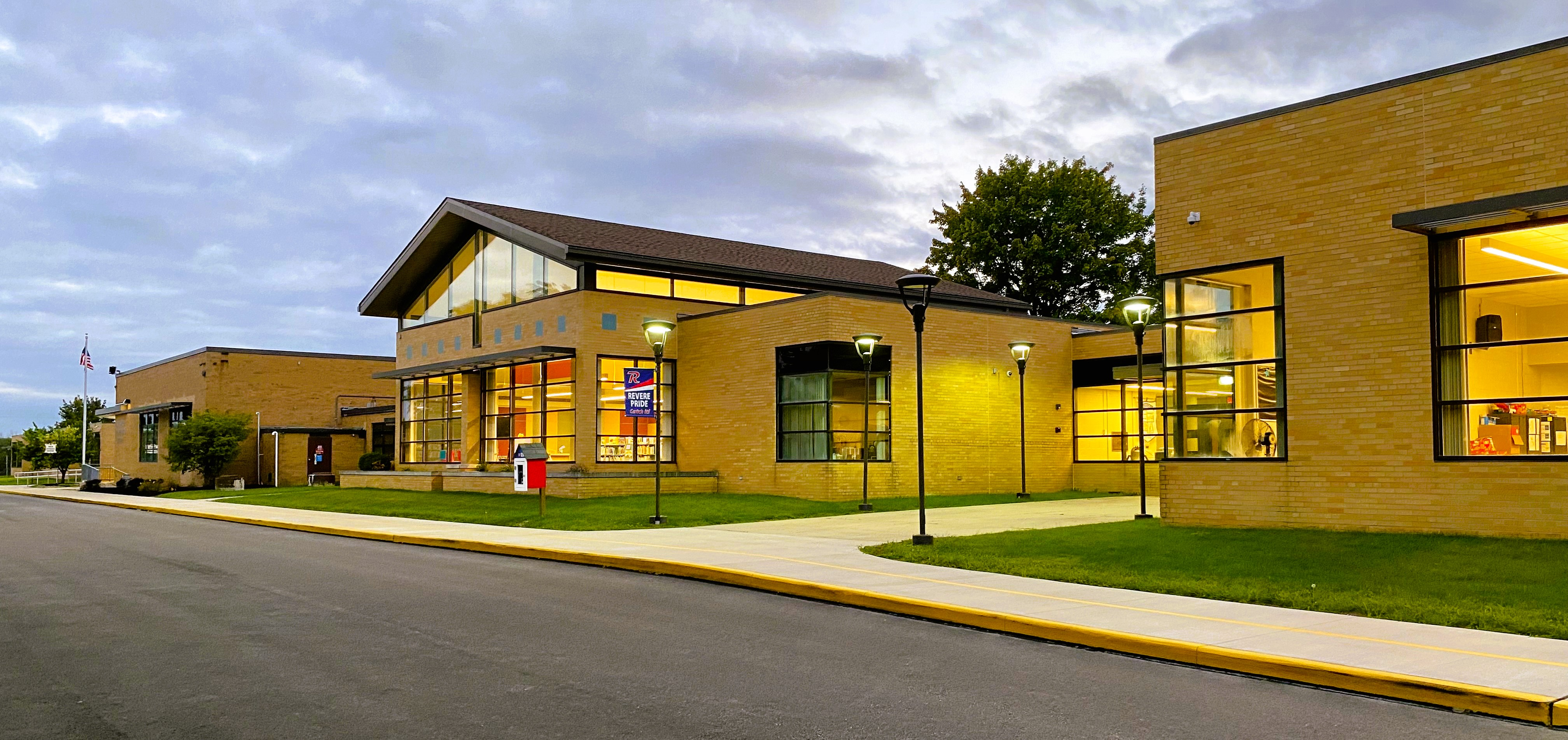
Richfield Elementary with the additions of the library in the middle and cafeteria on the right

In 1949, discussions began between Bath and Richfield school districts regarding the consolidation of their two districts. There was an agreement reached and land was purchased to build a new consolidated high school. While construction was taking place on the new high school, students split their days between Richfield and Bath schools (9th and 10th graders at Richfield in the morning and Bath in the afternoon). After completion of the high school, Richfield School became a K-8 building serving the residents of Richfield and improvements were made to Richfield to accommodate. Mr. Harold Schweisberger continued to serve as principal for the first year before becoming the principle for Revere High School the following year with Esther Burkett taking offer Richfield as the principal. With the addition of Hillcrest School in 1957 (6–8) to the district, Richfield School became a K-5 building. In 1960 when Eastview Junior High School (Revere Middle School) was added, Richfield School remained a K-5 building (residents of the two communities were split between Richfield, Bath, and Hillcrest schools). In 1961 when Eastview Junior High added freshmen, Richfield, Bath, and Hillcrest schools added 6th grade. In 1980, Hillcrest School became a primary building (K–2) and Richfield and Bath schools became elementary buildings (3–6) for the residents of their communities. In 1990, the district consolidated the kids from both communities and split the grades—Richfield School (3–4) and Bath School (5–6). In 1994, Richfield School closed. The decision was made based on the condition of the original Richfield building as well as the lesser demand of room with additions being added to other buildings—6th graders went to Revere Middle School, 3rd graders went to Hillcrest School, and 4th & 5th graders went to Bath School. The newer annex (1967) housed Summit Country Preschool for a number of years until 2009. The building was then used by the district for storage until the building and the 10.2 acres it sits on was sold in June 2012.

In 1916, the old school house between the centers was torn down to make way for the brick building, doubling its size—the building was dedicated in August 1917. In 1934, an addition was built to accommodate 1st grade classrooms and a woodshop classroom. In 1937 a bond was passed to add an addition onto the northern part of the existing school. The bond paid for 60% of construction while the New Deal program WPA, paid for the other 40%. The addition included a bus garage, auditorium/gymnasium, and addition classrooms. It was completed in 1939–1949. The class of 1940 was first to graduate in the new gymnasium, previous graduation ceremonies were held in Richfield Town Hall. After completion of the high school in 1954, Richfield School became a K-8 building serving the residents of Richfield and improvements were made to Richfield to accommodate: “the seventh grade room has a new floor, the former shop room floor has been refinished and converted into kindergarten rooms. The home economics room got a new floor, while on the third floor the partition between the library and former typing room has been removed.” In 1964 the Harold Schweisberger Library was constructed and dedicated. Mr. Schweisberger was a longtime principal at Richfield, served as principal at the new Revere High School for a year, and then became Revere's Superintendent for a number of years. On November 8, 1966 a bond passed on its second try (2,250–1,526) which allowed for Richfield to build an annex west of the school. It was finished in 1968 and featured new classrooms. Those students had their classrooms and then walked to the main building for lunch, music, art, and physical education. In 1994, the school district closed Richfield Schools. The newer addition was used for Summit County Preschool until officially closing in 2009. The building was then used by the district for storage until the building and the 10.2 acres it sits on was sold in June 2012.

In 1955 a bond was passed (1,123 to 660) to build the “$625,000 new elementary school on the northwest corner of Revere and Everett Roads.” The new 12-room school was being built to house Revere's sixth, seventh, and eight grade students from the bath and Richfield schools. The building also featured a “large utility room, combining the features of auditorium/stage, gym, and cafeteria.” In January 1957 it was given the name “Hillcrest” by the board of education. The construction of the building was completed in spring of 1957 and it opened its doors in the fall of 1957 with 342 students (grades 6–8) under the leadership of Mrs. Esther Burkett who was previously the principal of Richfield School (Mrs. Caroline Clark took her position as principal at Richfield School). The official dedication took place on April 27, 1958. In November 1957, Red and Gold were selected as Hillcrest's school colors and three years later the Tiger was adopted as Hillcrest's school mascot. In the fall of 1960, with the opening of Eastview Junior High (Revere Middle School), Hillcrest became a K–5 grade school with 395 students (Bath and Richfield schools also housed K-5th grades). In 1961 when Eastview Junior High added freshmen, Hillcrest School (along with Bath and Richfield schools) added 6th grade becoming a K–6th grade building. In 1963, Hillcrest School received an addition that extended the second hallway to the same length as the first hallway. In 1980, Hillcrest School became a primary building (K–2), and Bath and Richfield schools became elementary buildings (3–6) for the residents of their communities. In 1993, major additions were planned for Hillcrest School and the groundbreaking ceremony occurred on June 10, 1993. Completed in 1994, there were two major additions put on. To the south a new hallway with classrooms was added. To the north a new hallway with library, cafeteria, kitchen, and gymnasium was added with a new classroom hallway coming off of it (running perpendicular to the existing two hallways—north/south) with classrooms. The old “utility room” (gym, stage, cafeteria) was turned into classrooms, teacher's lounge, and classrooms. 6th graders went to Revere Middle School, 3rd graders went to Hillcrest, and 4th & 5th graders went to Bath Elementary. Hillcrest School is a one-floor, 88,922 square football building located on 50.22 acres.

Hillcrest Playground Improvement In 1998, a group that included the Hillcrest PTA, donors, teachers, and students improved and expanded the Hillcrest playground.

=== Richfield Elementary landmarks, memorials, and traditions ===
==== Coffee Mug Collage Picture ====
The collage was made in 1963 with broken coffee mugs. The project was led by art teacher Bill Fox.

==== Stanley Tree ====
The tree was planted in memory of Jim Stanley in 1994. Mr. Stanley was an electrician with the Local 06 IBEW (Electrician Union) and was doing work on the Hillcrest addition when he suffered a fatal heart attack. A tree was planted on the Red Playground in his memory.

==== Hillcrest Nature Center ====
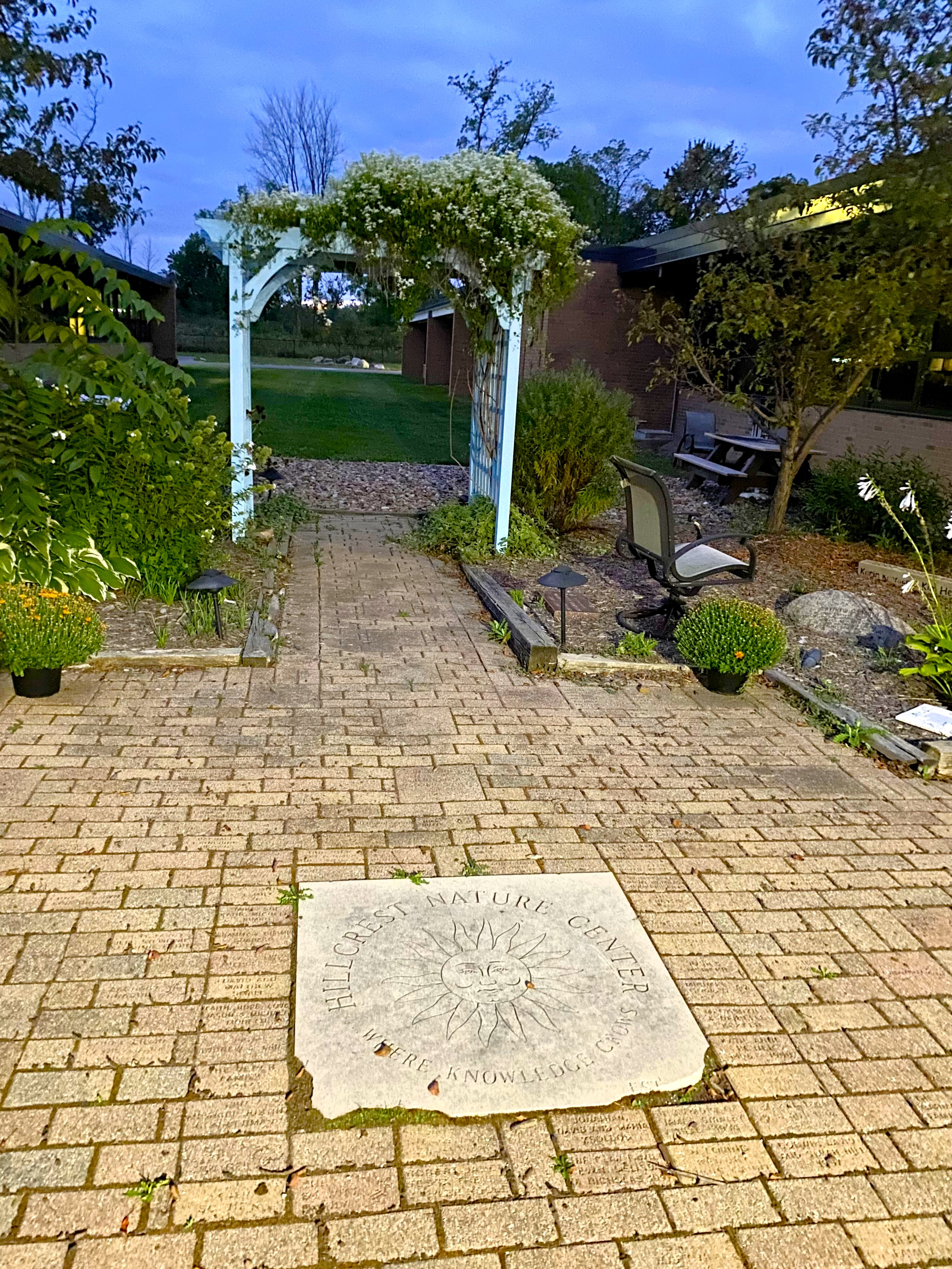
Hillcrest Nature Center

The Hillcrest Nature Center was established in 1997 as a combination memorial and educational garden. Bath resident and Hillcrest parent Susan Lines led, along with principal Fred Tomei, the effort to establish the garden. Donating services was Brown & Graves Lumber, R.B. Stout, Akron Tractor & Equipment, Jeff Knopp, Akron Plastics Industry, Goodyear, Richfield Safety Forces, North Hill Marble & Granite, along with countless other volunteers. Matthew G. Smith Bench and Rock: Was placed in 1997 as a memorial to Matthew G. Smith, a kindergartener died of neuroblastoma on December 21, 1996. Thornton Plaque: Was placed in 2013 as a memorial to Michelle “Shelly” Thornton, a student who died of neuroblastoma on February 20, 2013. She was a “spirited, funny, and curious” beautiful little girl. 9-11 Bench: Was placed in 2001 to honor the victims of the 9-11 attacks. It was donated by the Richfield Safety Forces.

==== Wolfe Tree ====
The tree was planted in memory of Norma Wolfe (1943–2003) in 2003. Norma worked as an aid at Hillcrest as well as raised her kids in Revere Schools.

== Bath Elementary School ==
=== History ===
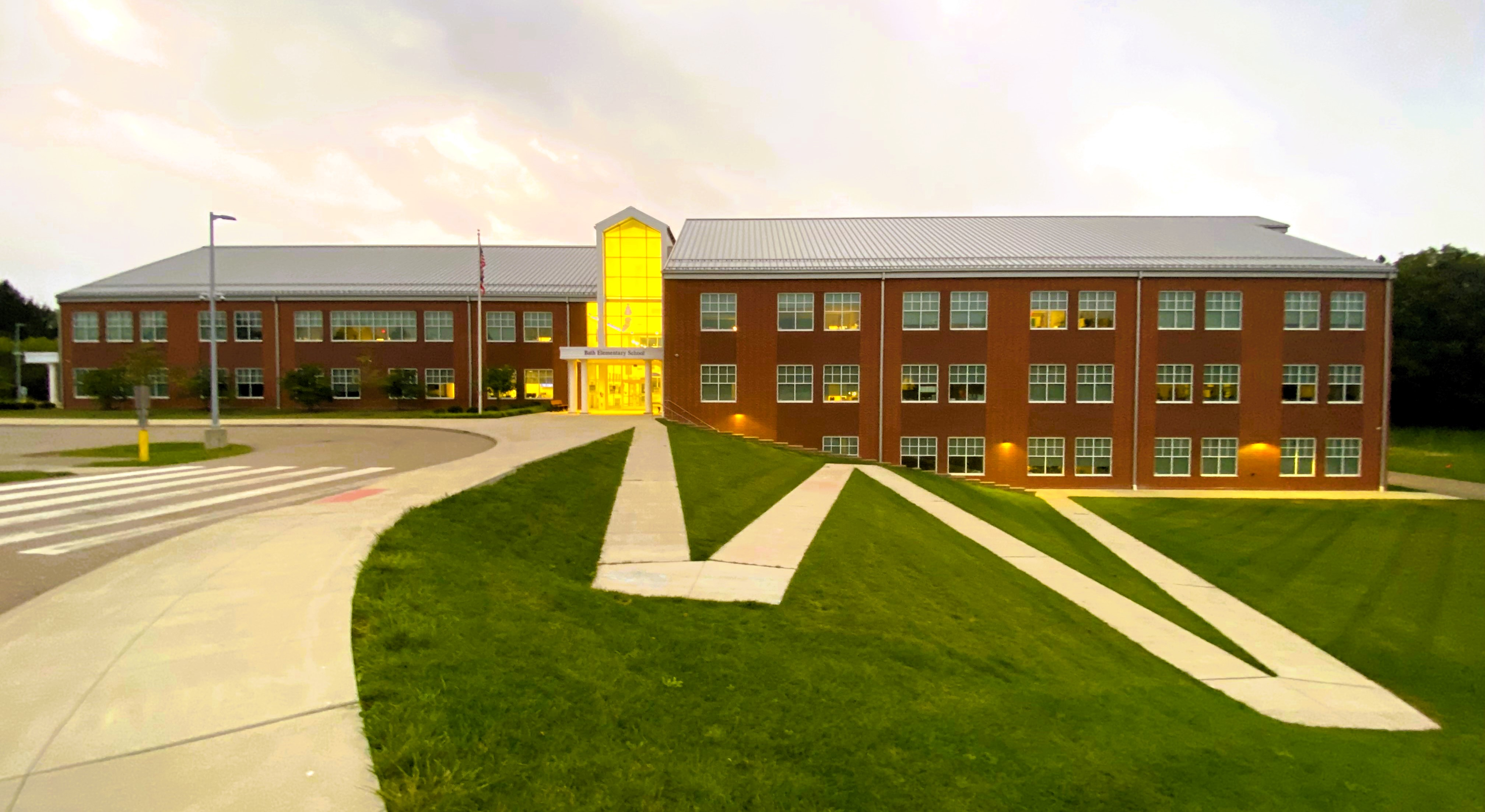
Bath Elementary School

In 1949, discussions began between Bath and Richfield school districts regarding the consolidation of their two school districts started. There was an agreement reached and land was purchased to build a new consolidated high school. While construction was taking place on the new high school, students split their days between Bath and Richfield schools (11th and 12th graders at Bath in the morning and Richfield in the afternoon). After completion of the high school, Bath School became a K–8 building serving the residents of Bath. With the addition of Hillcrest School in 1957 (6–8) to the district, Bath became a K–5 building. In 1960 when Eastview Junior High School (Revere Middle School) was added, Bath school remained a K–5 building (residents of the two communities were split between Bath, Richfield, and Hillcrest schools). In 1961 when Eastview Junior High added freshmen—Bath, Richfield, and Hillcrest schools added 6th grade. In 1980, Hillcrest School became a primary building (K–2), and Bath and Richfield schools became elementary buildings (3-6) for the residents of their communities. In 1990, the district consolidated the kids from both communities and split the grades—Bath School (5–6) and Richfield School (3–4). In 1994, 6th graders went to Revere Middle School, 3rd graders went to Hillcrest School, and 4th & 5th graders went to Bath School. Eventually, Bath adopted the Eagle as their mascot.

In 1923, all of the one-room schools closed and the centrally located Bath School opened its doors. Bath School was a K–12 building located on the corner of Cleveland-Massillon and Bath Roads and cost $112,000 to build and equip the new school. In 1929, an additional 5 acres of property was purchased along the purchasing of a two-room portable building from Copley. The portable building was added to the south of the school to accommodate for more students. In 1952, a bond was passed to expand Bath School and in 1953 the new annex was completed. It was built directly west of the Bath building and was built for the lower grades: “Bath kindergarten and the first and second grade will occupy the new four-classroom, steel building.” On November 8, 1966 a bond passed on its second try (2,250–1,526) which allowed for Bath School to build an addition. In 1968 the addition was finished, the original entrance was turned into a boys’ bathroom. The old boys’ bathroom/locker room was converted into a classroom (currently the band room). The girls’ locker room remains a girls’ restroom. Bath School currently stands as a four floor, 63,362 square foot building located on 12.3 acres.

On November 8, 2016, voters approved Issue 45 which provided funding to build a new high school, elementary school, and renovating-improving Hillcrest and the middle school.

=== Bath School landmarks, memorials, and traditions ===
==== Haser Tree ====
The spruce tree was planted in the spring of 1931 in memory of William “Bill” Haser who died in an explosion at Bath on December 1, 1930 known as the Bath Blast. The tree had to be removed in 2014 due to the new sewer system going in. Note: The tree was planted with the two Sourek spruce trees and were known as the Haser-Sourek Trees.

==== Sourek Trees ====
The spruce tree was planted in the spring of 1931 in memory of Betty Sourek, 17, and brother Joey Sourek, 6, who lost their lives in a home fire. Sourek road bears the family name. The tree had to be removed in 2014 due to the new sewer system going in. Note: The trees were planted with the Haser spruce tree and were known as the Haser-Sourek Trees.

==== Class of 1931 Bird Bath ====
The Bird Bath was a gift from the Bath High School Class of 1931.

==== Bath School Annual Kickball Classic (2000–present) ====
The kickball tournament was the idea of teacher John Faust and, with the support of principal Fred Tomei and physical education teacher Don King, it became a reality in 2000. The is a round robin format where the 4th grade champion plays the 5th grade champion for the right to play the staff in front of the entire school. Only one 4th grade team has defeated a 5th grade team, and only one student team has beaten the staff). For several years, the winner played the winner at Monroe Elementary (Tallmadge) in a school versus school championship unfortunately that series ended due to scheduling conflicts. Today, it back to 4th vs. 5th grade tournament with the winner facing the staff. It is now run by physical education teacher Gina Pappano over a two-day period in the spring.

==== Eagle Etching ====
A design created and donated by sculptor Don Drumm and abrasive blasting donated by Newsome & Work Metallizing Co (N&W). Don Blankenship an employee of N&W completed the sandblasting under the management of Gregory Newsome one of the owners of the company. It was completed on June 5, 2001.

==== Kelly Tree ====
The Kelly Tree was planted in memory of Travis Kelly in 2002, who died on April 28, 2002.

==== Schuelein Tree ====
The tree was planted in 2002 in memory of George Schuelein, a longtime custodian at Bath.

Jones Tree and Bench The bench was placed and the tree planted in 2006 in memory of Alexandra Sasha Jones (1994–2006) who was taken too soon in a car accident.

== Revere Middle School ==
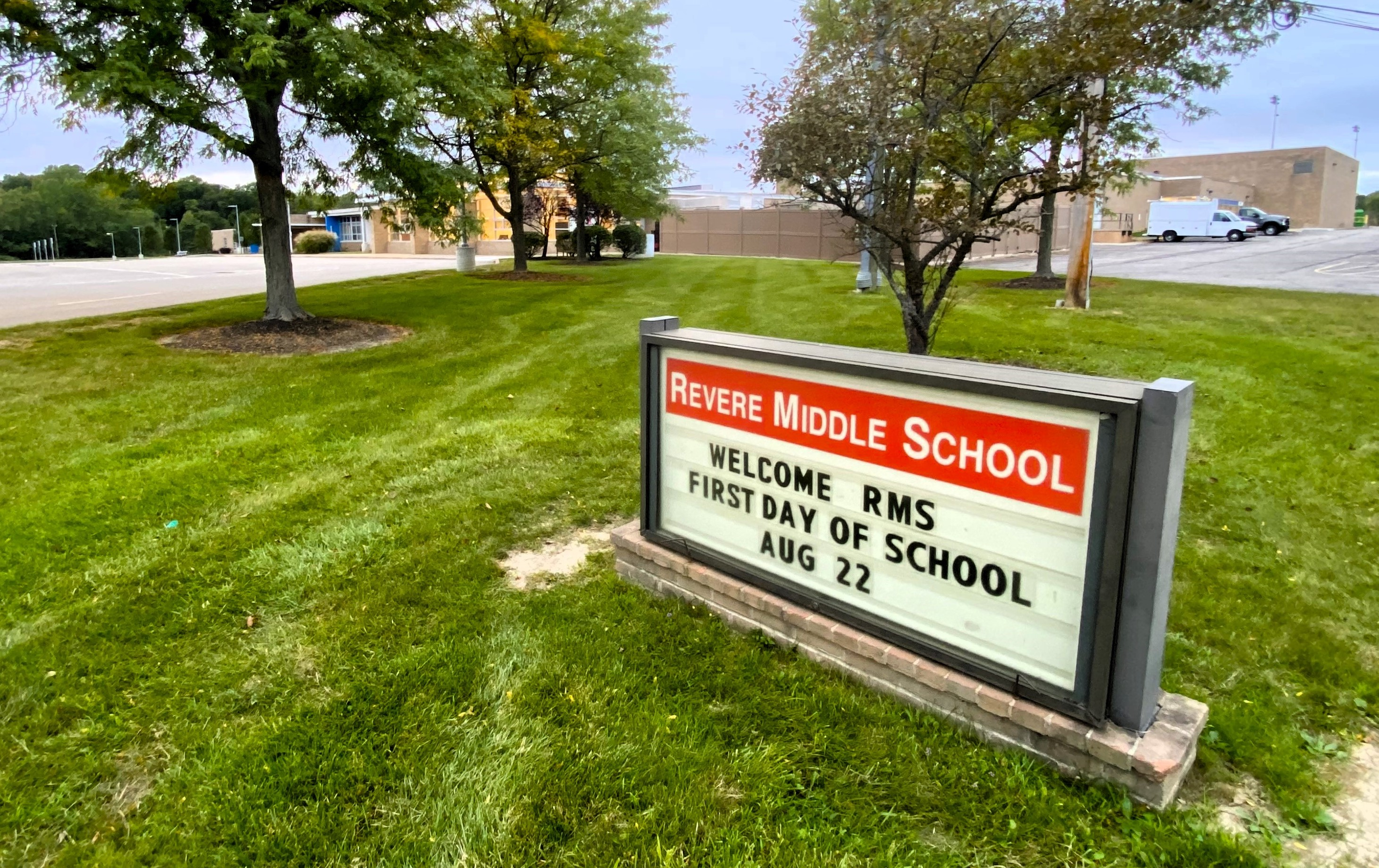

In November 1958, voters passed (57% in favor) a bond to build the $750,000 junior high school on the corner of Spring Valley Road and Revere road. It was built to house the sixth, seventh, and eighth graders with the plan to move 9th grade there when the high school's “population approaches 550 from its present 435.” In November 1959, voters passed a second bond issue to account for construction overruns, to add a wooden gym floor, and to build a $50,000 bus garage. Eastview Junior High opened in the fall of 1960 with “six hundred pupils in grades six, seven, and eight accommodate in 20 modern classrooms” with Esther Burkett serving as the principal. The official dedication occurred on Sunday, April 16, 1961. Eastview became a true Junior High in the fall of 1961 when freshmen were added and the six graders were relocated to the elementary buildings (Hillcrest, Bath, and Richfield). Eight Additional classrooms were completed to account for the change. Freshmen were still afforded the opportunity to participate in high school activities (sports, Lantern, National Forensic League, etc.). In 1975, freshmen returned to the high school and Eastview was a 7–8 building. In 1992 a bond passed to add major renovations to Revere Middle School. The groundbreaking occurred on November 15, 1993. A new wing was added to the west end of the school, which included a new library, science rooms, and 6th-grade classroom hallway. It also included a new gymnasium with locker rooms. Construction was completed in 1994. In 1994 with the building additions and the closing of Richfield School, 6th graders were added to Revere Middle School making it a grade 6–8 building. In ???? Eastview adopted the Patriot as their mascot.

=== Revere Middle School Landmarks, Memorials, and Traditions ===
==== Alex Fowler Plaque ====
The plaque was placed in memory of Alex Fowler (1989–2001) who died in an equestrian accident on June 9, 2001.

==== Lukity Bench ====
The bench was placed in memory of Mike Lukity (1988–2003).

==== Ellsworth Trophy Case ====
The trophy case was placed in memory of Jared Ellsworth (1991–2003). In addition, his parents Kathy and Scott Ellsworth ran a basketball tournament in his memory for 12 years, that tournament continues today as Revere Celebration Tournament.

==== Bennett Plaque ====
The plaque was placed in memory of James Bennett (1997–2012). James was a young man who endured a number of medical hardships and was lost too soon “but will never be forgotten.”

== Notable alumni ==
Notable alumni include:

- Jeffrey Dahmer, serial killer and sex offender

== Richfield School Bell ==
The bell was cast in 1888 by the Buckeye Bell Foundry, Van Payne & Taft, Cincinnati. The bell was originally used in the first school (built in 1887) and then later used to call students at the “new” Richfield School built in 1914 and then again at the new Richfield Centralized school built in 1917. In 1967 when Richfield had an annex built, a display was built in the front of the school which displayed the bell. In 1994, when the building was closed—the bell was moved and is now housed at Hillcrest Elementary School.

== District Enrollment Figures (K-12) ==
1965	1970	1974-75	1980	1985	1990	1995	2000	2005	2010	2015	2019	2020	2023
2,957	3,449	3,404	2,967	2,554	2,516	2,741	2,846	2,829	2,860	2,593	2,696	2,713	2,830
