= My Friend Dahmer (film) =

2017 film

- Theatrical release poster
- Directed by: Marc Meyers
- Screenplay by: Marc Meyers
- Based on: My Friend Dahmer by John "Derf" Backderf
- Produced by: Jody Girgenti; Marc Meyers; Adam Goldworm; Michael Merlob; Milan Chakraborty
- Starring: Ross Lynch; Anne Heche; Alex Wolff; Dallas Roberts; Tommy Nelson; Vincent Kartheiser
- Cinematography: Daniel Katz
- Edited by: Jamie Kirkpatrick
- Music by: Andrew Hollander
- Production companies: Ibid Filmworks; Aperture Entertainment; Attic Light Films
- Distributed by: FilmRise
- Release dates: April 21, 2017 (Tribeca Film Festival); November 3, 2017 (United States)
- Running time: 107 minutes
- Country: United States
- Language: English
- Budget: $1.5 million
- Box office: $1.4 million

My Friend Dahmer is a 2017 American biographical crime drama film written and directed by Marc Meyers about American serial killer Jeffrey Dahmer. The film is based on the 2012 graphic novel of the same name by cartoonist John "Derf" Backderf, who had been friends with Dahmer in high school in the 1970s, until the time Dahmer began his killing spree in 1978. The film stars Ross Lynch as Dahmer, Alex Wolff as Derf, Dallas Roberts as Lionel, Jeffrey's father, and Anne Heche as Joyce, Jeffrey's mother. The film premiered at the 2017 Tribeca Film Festival and was released in the United States on November 3, 2017, by Hulu. The film received generally positive reviews from critics, who praised its historical accuracy and Lynch's performance, but was a box office bomb, grossing $1.4 million worldwide against a $1.5 million budget.

== Plot ==
In 1974, Jeffrey Dahmer is a high school freshman living in the unincorporated Cleveland suburb of Bath, Ohio, with his parents, Lionel and Joyce, and his younger brother Dave. Jeffrey develops an obsession with a male jogger he sees every day from his school bus. As a hobby, he collects dead animals that he dissolves to the bone using chemicals from his father, who is a chemist. This hobby is initiated by his obsessive interest in how animals are "fitted together".

In 1978, Lionel trashes Jeffrey's collection of bones and orders him to make friends at school. During school, Jeffrey imitates the speech and gestures of his mother's interior designer (who has cerebral palsy), catching the attention of aspiring artist John "Derf" Backderf and his friends. Jeffrey inspires Derf to draw him in various situations; drawings that would later be incorporated into Derf's graphic novel My Friend Dahmer. Derf and his friends form the "Dahmer Fan Club," using Jeffrey for a variety of pranks (known as “Doing a Dahmer”) such as sneaking him in every yearbook photo, and conning their way to a private meeting with Vice President Walter Mondale during a school field trip to Washington, D.C.

Joyce starts relapsing into chronic mental illness, leading to increasingly bitter fights between her and Lionel. To cope, Jeffrey turns to drinking heavily, and begins killing animals. The jogger with whom he is obsessed turns out to be Dr. Matthews, the physician of one of Derf's friends. Jeffrey fakes a cold so that he can get an appointment with him, and he can examine Jeffrey naked. Dr. Matthews becomes uncomfortable when he notices that Jeffrey has an erection. At home, Jeffrey masturbates to the incident and fantasizes about having sex with Dr. Matthews' corpse. He starts stalking Dr. Matthews with a baseball bat, but never goes through with attacking him.

Jeffrey's father moves out. Jeffrey makes attempts to stay connected to his friends but ultimately drifts away from them. At graduation, Lionel hands Jeffrey the keys to the family Volkswagen Beetle which he would later use to commit his first murder. Unbeknownst to Lionel, Joyce leaves Ohio to live with relatives in Wisconsin, taking Dave with her and leaving Jeffrey completely alone.

That evening, Derf spots Jeffrey walking home with blood on his fingernails. Derf offers him a ride, finding him living alone with no plans for the future. Derf tells him that he is leaving for college and offers him his drawings of Jeffrey, which Jeffrey declines. Jeffrey invites Derf inside for a beer, but he turns him down. As Derf walks back to his car, Jeffrey pretends to strike him with a baseball bat but puts it down. As Derf drives home, he notices the bat. Jeffrey never has contact with his high school friends again.

Two weeks later, Jeffrey picks up hitchhiker Steven Hicks. The closing credits note that Hicks was never seen again and Jeffrey Dahmer admitted to killing 17 men when he was finally arrested in 1991.

== Cast ==
- Ross Lynch as Jeffrey Dahmer, Lionel and Joyce's son, who has obsessive fantasies of rape, cannibalism, and necrophilia.
- Alex Wolff as John "Derf" Backderf, Dahmer's closest friend and an aspiring graphic artist
- Vincent Kartheiser as Dr. Matthews
- Anne Heche as Joyce Dahmer, Lionel's wife and Jeffrey's mother
- Dallas Roberts as Lionel Dahmer, Joyce's husband and Jeffrey's father
- Tommy Nelson as Neil Davis, one of Dahmer and Backderf's friends
- Harrison Holzer as Mike, one of Dahmer and Backderf's friends
- Tom Luce as Walter Mondale, Vice President of the United States whom Dahmer and Backderf meet during a school field trip to Washington D.C.
- Cameron McKendry as Moose, the bully at Jeffrey's high school
- Miles Robbins as Lloyd Figg
- Liam Koeth as Dave Dahmer, Jeffrey's brother
- Lily Kozub as Bridget, the girl Jeffrey took to the high school prom
- Dave Sorboro as Steven Hicks, a hitchhiker and Dahmer’s first murder victim.

== Production ==
The script appeared on 2014's Black List.

Ross Lynch was cast as the teenage Dahmer in 2016. Lynch had previously been employed as a teen actor by the Disney Channel, most notably starring in the show Austin & Ally. John Backderf, the author of the graphic novel, was enthusiastic about this casting against type, stating that Lynch's performance would make viewers "uncomfortable because it's so familiar". Later in the month Alex Wolff, Vincent Kartheiser and Anne Heche joined the cast, with Heche playing Dahmer's mother.

Filming took place in Bath, Ohio, and Middleburg Heights, Ohio, from August 23, 2016 to September 2016. Scenes depicting Dahmer's home life were filmed in Dahmer's actual childhood home in Ohio. Actors in the movie said that it was very strange to be in the home where the serial killer lived. They also mentioned that the house is where Dahmer's pathology began.

In comparison to the comic, Derf is added into scenes in the movie that he was not actually present at, including the fishing scene, the DC trip, and the prom. It was also Derf, not Neil, who felt bad about the mall incident. Most prominently, it was Neil who gave Dahmer the final ride home, not Derf, and it was likely right after Hicks’ murder, not before.

== Release ==
My Friend Dahmer premiered at the 2017 Tribeca Film Festival on April 21, 2017. On May 15, 2017, FilmRise acquired distribution rights to the film, planning to release it in the fall. The film was released in limited theaters on November 3, 2017, with a wider release the following month.

== Reception ==
=== Critical response ===
On the review aggregator website Rotten Tomatoes, the film has an 86% rating based on 105 reviews, with an average rating of 7/10. The website's critical consensus reads, "My Friend Dahmer opens a window into the making of a serial killer whose conclusions are as empathetic as they are deeply troubling". Metacritic, another review aggregator, assigned the film a weighted average score of 68 out of 100, based on 26 critics, indicating "generally-favorable reviews".

=== Box office ===
My Friend Dahmer was a failure at the box office, grossing $1.4 million on a budget of around $1.5 million.

== See also ==
- The Secret Life: Jeffrey Dahmer – A 1993 biographical crime drama film (starring Carl Crew).
- Dahmer – A 2002 biographical true crime horror film (starring Jeremy Renner).
- The Jeffrey Dahmer Files – A 2012 independent documentary film.
- Dahmer – Monster: The Jeffrey Dahmer Story- A 10-part biographical crime drama series that was commissioned by Netflix and released on September 21, 2022. Evan Peters portrayed Dahmer.
