= My Friend Dahmer =

Graphic novel and memoir by Derf Backderf

- The cover of My Friend Dahmer. Artwork by Derf.
- Creator: Derf Backderf
- Date: 2012
- Page count: 224 pages
- Publisher: Abrams ComicArts
- ISBN: 978-1419702174

Chronology
- Preceded by: Punk Rock & Trailer Parks
- Followed by: Trashed

My Friend Dahmer is a 2012 graphic novel and memoir by artist John "Derf" Backderf about his teenage friendship with Jeffrey Dahmer, who later became a serial killer. The book evolved from a 24-page, self-published version by Backderf in 2002.

== Background ==
Backderf and Dahmer both attended Revere High School in Bath Township, Ohio, from 1974 to 1978. They were familiar with each other, but never close friends and Backderf later stated Dahmer didn't seem to have any close friends at all. There was an informal group at the school called the "Dahmer Fan Club", which tolerated Dahmer as a sort of mascot because they found his bizarre antics and pranks amusing. However, as their senior year progressed in 1978, Backderf deliberately distanced himself from Dahmer, due to Dahmer's behavior becoming more disturbing rather than humorous in conjunction with escalating alcohol abuse.

After Dahmer's crimes were publicized in 1991, Backderf was working as a professional cartoonist. He met with two others who had known Dahmer in high school to discuss Dahmer and their recollections. With the new information regarding Dahmer's fate, many of his odd behaviors in adolescence seemed to make sense. Backderf recorded some of the stories shared in his sketchbook, which would serve as the beginning of My Friend Dahmer. He started focusing on writing the stories in 1994 following Dahmer's death.

Because Backderf worked at Akron Beacon Journal, he also had access to much information about Dahmer's crimes before they became public knowledge, which, combined with his personal history with Dahmer, put him in a perfect situation to shed light on him.

When Backderf initially began creating the comics, he thought of them as a series of mini-comics or as an anthology told from his own perspective. Later, he returned to their high school for a more in-depth, journalistic approach wherein he collected information via interviews and examination of FBI files.

In 1997, My Friend Dahmer was first released in the comic anthology Zero Zero #18 (Fantagraphics, July 1997). Backderf, wanting to write a full-length work, began writing publication proposals using a single chapter; publishers often shied away from the subject matter, fearing the gore associated with Dahmer. Therefore, in 2002, he self-published the work as a 24-page comic.

After twenty years of background research, Backderf drafted the full manuscript in two weeks, and publishers became interested in the story. The final, full-length book was published by Abrams Books in 2012.

== Plot ==
The novel depicts the author's teenage friendship with Jeffrey Dahmer, who later became an infamous serial killer, during his time at Eastview Junior High and Revere High School. The story follows Dahmer from age 12 up to, but not including, his first murder, two weeks after high school graduation.

Derf, while not excusing or forgiving Dahmer's crimes, presents an empathetic portrait of Dahmer as a lonely young man tormented by inner demons, ridiculed by bullies at school, and neglected by the adults in his life. The graphic novel recalls Dahmer's isolation, his binge drinking, his bizarre behavior to get attention, and his disturbing fascination with roadkill. Derf and his friends encouraged Dahmer to act out, including faking epileptic seizures in school and the mall and pretending to have cerebral palsy.

== Adaptations ==
The original self-published comic book was adapted and staged as a one-act play by the NYU Theater Department.

In 2017, the novel was adapted into a film directed by Marc Meyers and starring Ross Lynch as Jeffrey Dahmer. On the review aggregator website Rotten Tomatoes, the film has an 86% rating based on 88 reviews, with an average rating of 7/10. The website's critical consensus reads, "My Friend Dahmer opens a window into the making of a serial killer whose conclusions are as empathetic as they are deeply troubling." Metacritic, another review aggregator, assigned the film a weighted average score of 68 out of 100, based on 25 critics, indicating "generally favorable reviews".

== Reception ==
=== Reviews ===
My Friend Dahmer was generally well received by critics, including starred reviews from Kirkus Reviews, Publishers Weekly. Kirkus called the book "[a]n exemplary demonstration of the transformative possibilities of graphic narrative." Publishers Weekly called the writing "impeccably honest" and the story "quietly horrifying".

Multiple reviewers also highlighted the book's art style. Booklist noted, "The blunt, ungainly drawings, with their robotically stiff figures, effectively convey the drab suburban milieu." Time's Lev Grossman pointed out that "[t]he psychedelic wavy highlights Backderf draws on glass are like Proust's madeleine to anybody who was alive in the 1970’s, and the way Backderf draws people owes a lot to Mad magazine's Don Martin, ... [whose] characters all have those long, angular heads and exaggeratedly articulated joints."

Library Journal called the book "a thoughtfully terrifying look at unmonitored tendencies and careless interactions combining to forge a serial murderer" and said it "is a real butt-kicker for educators and youth counselors as well as peers of other potential Dahmers."

=== Awards and honors ===
In 2012, Publishers Weekly named My Friend Dahmer in their list of the year's top five comics; Lev Grossman, book critic for Time, named it one of his top five nonfiction books of the year; and The A.V. Club named it the year's best nonfiction book.

Awards for My Friend Dahmer
| Year | Award | Result | Ref. |
|---|---|---|---|
| 2012 | Ignatz Award for Outstanding Graphic Novel | Nominee | |
| 2012 | Reuben Award | Nominee | |
| 2013 | American Library Association's (ALA) Great Graphic Novels for Teens | Top 10 | |
| 2013 | Alex Awards | Winner | |
| 2013 | ALA's Quick Picks for Reluctant Young Adult Readers | Top 10 | |
| 2015 | ALA's Popular Paperbacks for Young Adults | Top 10 | |
| 2013 | Harvey Awards for Best Graphic Album - Original | Nominee | |
| 2014 | Angoulême International Comics Festival's Revelation Award | Winner | |

=== Controversy ===
In 2021, My Friend Dahmer was one of 22 books removed from libraries in Texas's Leander Independent School District "as part of an initiative to prohibit "inappropriate" books in their learning institutions." The book was later returned to shelves with the requirement that readers receive counseling regarding its contents.

When asked to speculate on why My Friend Dahmer was removed from Texas school libraries, Backderf reiterated how the book does not include violence, sex, or profanity. He conjectured: "People are objecting to what [Dahmer] became, ... not what I depict in my book." Backderf also disagreed with the requirement students should receive counseling after reading the book.
