= Derf Backderf =

American cartoonist

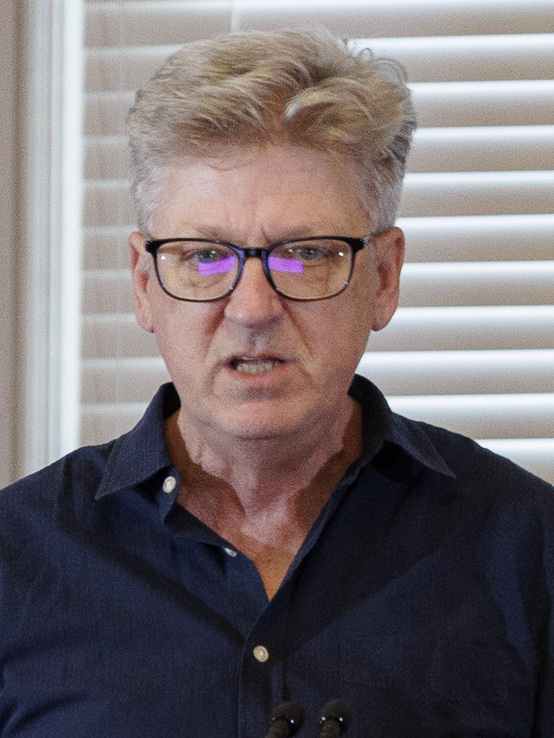
- Backderf in 2023
- Born: John Backderf; October 31, 1959 (age 67) Richfield, Ohio, US
- Area: Cartoonist
- Pseudonym: Derf
- Notable works: My Friend Dahmer; The City
- Awards: Robert F. Kennedy Journalism Award, 2006; Inkpot Award, 2016, Eisner Award, 2016 & 2021

John Backderf (born October 31, 1959), also known as Derf or Derf Backderf, is an American cartoonist. He is most famous for his graphic novels, especially My Friend Dahmer, the international bestseller which won an Angoulême Prize, and earlier for his comic strip The City, which appeared in a number of alternative newspapers from 1990 to 2014. In 2006 Derf won the Robert F. Kennedy Journalism Award for cartooning. Backderf has been based in Cleveland, Ohio, for much of his career.

== Early life ==
Backderf grew up in Richfield, Ohio, the son of a chemist. He attended Eastview Junior High and Revere High School, where one of his classmates was future serial killer Jeffrey Dahmer.

Backderf graduated from high school in 1978 and attended the Art Institute of Pittsburgh for six months before dropping out. The following year, he worked as a garbageman back in his hometown. Backderf then attended, and graduated from, Ohio State University with a Bachelors in Art of journalism. Backderf was immersed in the punk movement during the late 1970s and early 1980s.

He began as a political cartoonist, for the Ohio State Lantern, then professionally at The Evening Times, the evening counterpart of The Palm Beach Post, in West Palm Beach, Florida. He worked as a staff cartoonist at the Cleveland Plain Dealer in the late 80s. In the mid-1990s Backderf worked in the newsroom of the Akron Beacon Journal.

== Work ==
=== The City ===
Backderf's comic strip The City appeared in 174 publications, mostly free weekly newspapers, starting with the now-defunct Cleveland Edition in 1990, including: The Village Voice, The Chicago Reader, Cleveland Scene, Miami New Times, Houston Press, Pittsburgh City Paper, The Providence Phoenix, and Washington City Paper. In 2014, Derf announced that he was discontinuing The City to focus on graphic novels.

Strips from The City were collected in The City: The World's Most Grueling Comic Strip (SLG Publishing, 2003) and a four-volume series of comic books, True Stories (Alternative Comics, 2015, 2016, 2018).

=== Graphic novels ===
==== Punk Rock & Trailer Parks ====
Backderf wrote Punk Rock & Trailer Parks (SLG Publishing, 2010), a 152-page graphic novel set in 1980, during the punk rock heyday in Akron, Ohio, a music scene that produced such acts as Devo, Chrissie Hynde, and The Cramps. Punk Rock & Trailer Parks is a fictional story that follows one remarkable young man named Otto who, through talent, wits and sheer chutzpah becomes a star in the Rubber City punk scene and has memorable meetings with underground luminaries of the day, including Wendy O. Williams, Stiv Bators, Lester Bangs, and The Clash. Punk Rock & Trailer Parks was featured in the 2010 edition of Best American Comics (Houghton Mifflin).

==== My Friend Dahmer ====
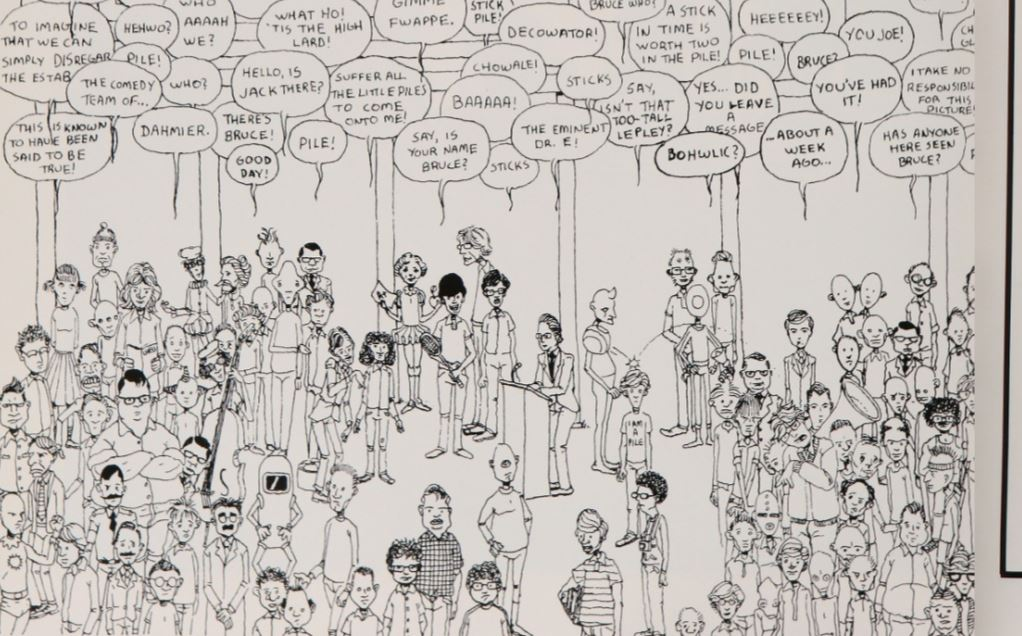
A Backderf illustration taken from the 1978 Revere High School yearbook. Dahmer is depicted in the lower right of the illustration mimicking an individual with cerebral palsy.

My Friend Dahmer (Abrams Comic Arts, 2012) is the culmination of a comic book project first started in 1994, shortly after Jeffrey Dahmer was murdered in prison. The book is the true story of how a young Backderf befriended his high-school classmate Dahmer, a troubled teenager prone to odd behavior, because he and his friends were amused by Dahmer's antics; the book also depicts some of Dahmer's increasingly morbid behavior that Backderf was unaware of at the time, culminating in Backderf and his friends falling away from Dahmer when he becomes more disturbing than funny.

Backderf's first Dahmer story appeared in Zero Zero #18 (Fantagraphics, July 1997). Backderf then pitched the project as a 100-page graphic novel, but failed to find a publisher. He then self-published a scaled-back 24-page My Friend Dahmer comic book in 2002. The original self-published comic book was nominated for an Eisner Award and was adapted and staged as a one-act play by the NYU Theater Dept. The final 224-page incarnation was nominated for Ignatz, Harvey, and Reuben Awards, received an Angoulême Award and was named by Time magazine as one of the top five non-fiction books of 2012. Lev Grossman, book critic for Time, named My Friend Dahmer as one of the "top five non-fiction books of the year". The book has been translated into 14 languages. A film adaptation of My Friend Dahmer, starring Ross Lynch as Dahmer, Alex Wolff as Backderf, Anne Heche, Dallas Roberts and Vincent Kartheiser, premiered at the 2017 Tribeca Film Festival and received a general theatrical release in the fall of 2017. The film received generally positive reviews.

==== Trashed ====
Trashed (Abrams Comic Arts, 2015), an Eisner Award-winning fictional story based on Derf's experiences as a 21-year-old garbageman, was published as a 240-page graphic novel. The project first appeared as a 50-page magazine-size comic book (SLG Publishing, 2002) . It was Derf's first attempt at long-form storytelling and was nominated for the Eisner Award for Best Writer-artist. Derf revisited the project as a webcomic in 2010 and 2012 on his website.

==== Kent State: Four Dead in Ohio ====
Kent State: Four Dead in Ohio (Abrams Comic Arts, 2020; ISBN 9781683358619) addresses the 1970 Kent State shootings. The 288-page book, which is heavily researched and includes copious footnotes at the end, is a dramatic recreation of those four bloody days in 1970 that resulted in four students being shot and killed by Ohio National Guard troops. It profiles each of the four students who were killed, telling their stories through the days leading up to May 4, using personal details gathered through interviews with friends and oral histories from the May 4th special collection and archive amongst other sources. The book was first published on September 8, 2020, right before the 50th anniversary of Kent State shooting. It has won a number of accolades, including an Alex Award from the Young Adult Library Services Association (YALSA) division of the American Library Association, the 2021 Eisner Award for best reality-based work, and the 2021 Ringo Award in the same category.

== Art style ==
Derf cites Spain Rodriguez, Mad magazine and Lynda Barry as important influences on his art style. He also credits Expressionism as the inspiration for his usage of heavy ink, but feels the major influence on his work is the imagery of punk.

Backderf has contributed to many well-known national publications, including Playboy, The Wall Street Journal and The Progressive. His illustrations have also appeared on posters, T-shirts, and CD covers.

=== Exhibitions ===
Backderf's work has been displayed in many galleries and museums both in the United States and abroad. In 1995, he had a large solo show at Altered Image Gallery in Cleveland, and in 1999 the Akron Art Museum put on a retrospective of his work, titled "Apocalyptic Giggles: The Industrial Cartoon Humor of Derf". The Billy Ireland Cartoon Library & Museum at the Ohio State University established a Derf Collection of original art and papers in 2011. In 2021, the Society of Illustrators in New York City held a major exhibition of original art from Kent State: Four Dead in Ohio.

== Awards ==
Backderf has won over 50 awards for his newspaper work, including a Bronze Medal from the Society of Newspaper Design. He was a member of the newsroom team for the Akron Beacon Journal that was awarded the Pulitzer Prize in 1995. In 2006 Derf won the Robert F. Kennedy Journalism Award for cartooning. He received the Prix Révélation at the 2014 Angoulême International Comics Festival in France. In 2016, he won an Eisner Award for lettering for Trashed. In 2021, he won both an Eisner Award and a Ringo Award for Best Non-fiction Book for Kent State: Four Dead in Ohio.
