= How He Fell in Love =

- Theatrical release poster
- Directed by: Marc Meyers
- Written by: Marc Meyers
- Produced by: Jody Girgenti; Marc Meyers
- Starring: Matt McGorry; Amy Hargreaves; Britne Oldford; Mark Blum
- Cinematography: Ruben O'Malley
- Edited by: Jamie Kirkpatrick
- Music by: Gambles; Jay Lifton
- Production company: Ibid Filmworks
- Distributed by: Orion Pictures; Monument Releasing
- Release dates: June 11, 2015 (LA Film Fest); July 15, 2016 (United States)
- Running time: 107 minutes
- Country: United States
- Language: English
- Box office: $17,575

How He Fell in Love is a 2015 American romantic drama film written and directed by Marc Meyers and starring Matt McGorry, Amy Hargreaves, Britne Oldford, and Mark Blum. It premiered at the LA Film Fest on June 11, 2015, and was released theatrically by Orion Pictures and Monument Releasing on July 15, 2016.

== Synopsis ==
The film revolves around Travis (McGorry), a young struggling musician, who crosses paths with Ellen (Hargreaves) at a wedding. She's an older married yoga teacher who is trying to adopt a child with her husband. Travis and Ellen begin an affair that slowly deepens into something more intimate and profound. As their encounters continue, Ellen is confronted with her failing marriage while Travis must face the consequences of his actions.

== Cast ==
- Matt McGorry as Travis
- Amy Hargreaves as Ellen
- Mark Blum as Henry
- Britne Oldford as Monica
- Bobby Moreno as Jason
- Seth Barrish as Steve
- Denny Bess as Ian
- Turna Mete as Karen

== Production ==
Myers revisited a previous draft of the script after completing his previous film, Harvest (2010), as he felt that after several years of marriage, it was time to return to the story and explore a type of intimacy that he never put on screen before.

== Reception ==
The film received mixed reviews from critics, currently holding a 38% "Rotten" rating on Rotten Tomatoes. Nick Schager of Variety was positive about the film, saying that it was "Mature and moving in its navigation of convoluted, conflicting desires." Bob Strauss of the Los Angeles Daily News wrote that "It's the type of mature drama that's rarely seen in American movies -- even the indie ones." Steve Greene of Indiewire also wrote positively of the film, praising Amy Hargreaves' performance and saying that "With a sharp focus...Meyers foregoes easy judgment or condemnation to give a full view of a love with consequences."
