= Karen Leach =

American biochemist

Karen L. Leach is an American biochemist.

== Early life and education ==
Born in Akron, Ohio to Glenn and Margaret Leach, she was the third of four daughters. Leach graduated as valedictorian from Revere High School in Richfield Ohio in 1973 and attended Ohio Wesleyan University, graduating magna cum laude with a BA in biochemistry, in 1977. In the laboratory of William B. Pratt at the University of Michigan, Leach did graduate research focused on the regulation of glucocorticoid hormone action and received her Ph.D. from the department of pharmacology in 1981.

== Scientific contributions ==
Leach continued her scientific research as a National Research Service Award Postdoctoral Fellow at the National Institutes of Health (NIH) where she studied the cancer-related phorbol estrogen receptor in the laboratory of Peter Blumberg. Publications from the laboratory of Yasutomi Nishizuka on a newly discovered enzyme named protein kinase C (PKC) that was stimulated by phorbol ester led Leach to the realization that the phorbol estrogen receptor she was studying was in fact PKC. These fundamental discoveries in a burgeoning new field fueled Leach's passion for kinases and in the broader field of signal transduction.

Leach moved on to research in the pharmaceutical industry (at The Upjohn Company, which became the Pharmacia Corp and eventually at Pfizer, Inc.) where her expertise with kinases and signal transduction launched her career, enabling her to lead discovery teams in the fields of oncology, Alzheimer Disease, and calcium signaling, leading to her application of these scientific insights to understanding of drug safety issues, particularly for the novel class of oxazolidinone antibiotics such as linezolid. The approval of Zyvox to the antibiotic armentarium in 2000 was hailed as a much needed breakthrough in addressing the antibiotic resistance crisis. However safety concerns during prolonged usage in some patients highlighted a need for understanding the molecular basis of the toxicity in humans in order to design safer next- generation antibiotics. Given the mechanism of action for oxazolidinones as protein translation disruptors in bacterial pathogens and the bacterial ancestry of mitochondria, Leach began pursuing research into the hypothesis that the toxicity to human cells was linked to inhibition of mitochondrial protein synthesis. Her lab generated significant amounts of data implicating the role of mitochondrial protein synthesis inhibition in mammalian cellular toxicity. Their conclusive experiment was the direct demonstration of the absence of oxazolidinone toxicity in rho 0 cells, which contain mitochondria, but lack mitochondrial DNA and thus are unable to synthesize proteins. By showing mitochondrial protein synthesis was the link to Zyvox cytotoxicity in human cells, this research led to important advances in antibiotic safety and utilization of in vitro assays to predict in vivo toxicity.

Leach went on to conduct cross-disciplinary efforts within Pfizer using chemistry-cell biology approaches to predict safety issues in vitro, long before the drug leads were tested in animals. Her kinase expertise helped connect scientists across a wide array of therapeutic discovery efforts within Pfizer where she led a coordinated kinase safety effort across this large multinational corporation. Tapping into her kinase expertise in drug discovery efforts, she became a scientific liaison to the Division of Signal Transduction Therapy at the University of Dundee School of Life Sciences. Her research at Pfizer continued to focus on in vitro predictions of compound safety, for kinase inhibitors as well as other drug discovery candidates and therapeutic agents.

== Representative publications ==
- Zhang X, Scialis RJ, Feng B, Leach K. Detection of statin cytotoxicity is increased in cells expressing the OATP1B1 transporter. Toxicol Sci. 2013;134(1):73‐82. \
- Leach, K.L., Swaney, S.M., Colca, J.R., McDonald, W.G., Blinn, J.R., Shinabarger, D., Xiong, L., Mankin, A. S. The site of action of oxazolidinone antibiotics in living bacteria and in human mitochondria. Molecular Cell 26: 393-402, 2007.
- Nagiec, Eva E.; Wu, Luping; Swaney, Steve M.; Chosay, John G.; Ross, Daniel E.; Brieland, Joan K.; Leach, Karen L. Oxazolidinones inhibit cellular proliferation via inhibition of mitochondrial protein synthesis. Antimicrobial Agents and Chemotherapy 49, 3896-3902, 2005.
- Clare, P.M, Poorman, R.A., Kelly, L.C., Watenpaugh, K.D., Leach, K.L. Cdk2 and cdk5 act by a random, uncompetitive kinetic mechanism. J. Biol. Chem. 276:48292-48299, 2001.
- Scott, J.E., Ruff, V.A., Leach, K.L. Dynamic equilibrium between calcineurin and kinase activities regulates the phosphorylation state and localization of the nuclear factor of activated T-cells. Biochem. J. 324: 597-603, 1997
- Leach, K.L., Ruff, V.A., Jarpe, M.B., Adams, L.D., Fabbro, D., and Raben, D.M. Alpha-Thrombin stimulates nuclear diglyceride levels and differential nuclear localization of protein kinase C isozymes in IIC9 cells. J. Biological Chemistry 267:21816-21822, 1992.
- Leach, K.L., Powers, E.A., Ruff, V.A., Jaken, S. and Kaufmann, S. Type 3 protein kinase C localization to the nuclear envelope of phorbol ester-treated NIH 3T3 cells. J. Cell. Biol., 109:685-695, 1989.
- Leach, K.L. and Blumberg, P.M. Modulation of protein kinase C activity and [3H] phorbol 12,13-dibutyrate binding by various tumor promoters. Cancer Res., 45:1958-1963, 1985.
- Leach, K.L., James, M.L. and Blumberg, P.M. Characterization of a specific phorbol ester apo-receptor in mouse brain cytosol. Proc. Natl. Acad. Sci. USA, 80:4208-4212,1983.
- Leach, K.L., Grippo, J.F., Housley, P.R., Dahmer, M.K., Salive, M.E. and Pratt, W.B. Characteristics of an endogenous glucocorticoid receptor stabilizing factor. J. Biol. Chem., 257:381-388, 1982
