= Revere High School (Ohio) =

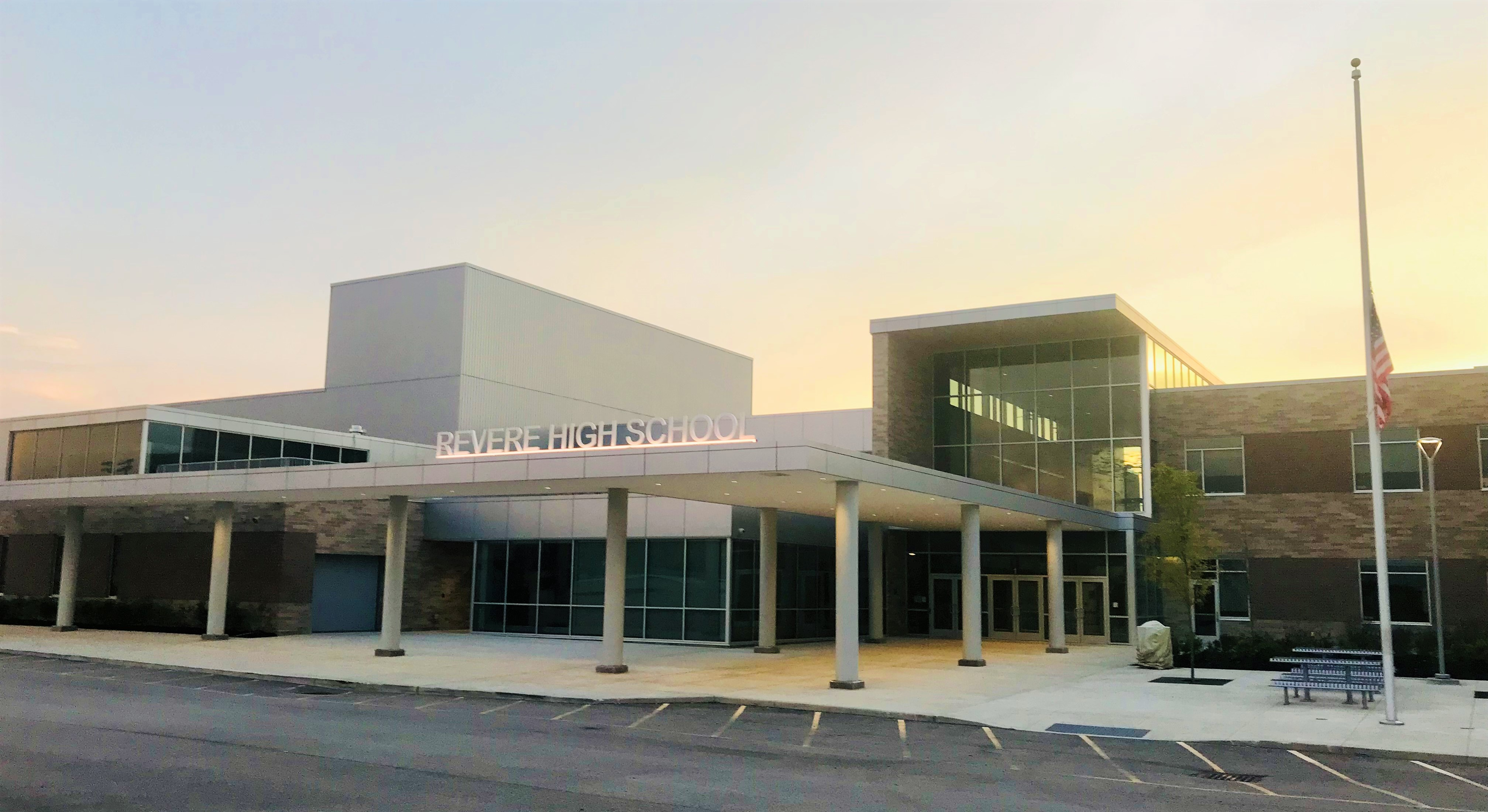

Location
- 3420 Everett Road; Richfield, Ohio 44286; United States; 41°12′04″N 81°37′04″W

Information
- School district: Revere Local School District
- Principal: Doug Faris
- Staff: 48.00 (FTE)
- Grades: 9–12
- Enrollment: 922 (2023–2024)
- Student to teacher ratio: 19.21
- Colors: scarlet, white, and royal blue
- Fight song: Battle Cry II
- Athletics conference: Suburban League; American Division
- Team name: Minutemen
- Newspaper: The Lantern
- Yearbook: The Reverie
- Website: rhs.revereschools.org

Revere High School (RHS) is a public high school located in Bath Township, adjacent to the village of Richfield, Ohio, United States. It is the only high school in the Revere Local School District and serves students in Bath Township, Richfield Village, and Richfield Township, along with small portions of Copley, Akron, and Boston Township.

In 2010, 2011, and 2015, the U.S. News & World Report named Revere High School a Silver school and ranked it in the top 1,000 schools in the United States. RHS offers 16 Advanced Placement courses from the College Board and in 2017, the school introduced several college credit plus courses where students earn college credit through the University of Akron.

== History and previous building (1953-2020) ==
In the early part of 1950, the Bath-Richfield School Board supervised the purchase of 28 acres for the site of the new school at the intersection of Revere and Everett Roads. On 5 October 1950, the school board selected Revere High School as the name for the new school. This was also the high school where serial killer, Jeffrey Dahmer, attended.

The name, which was eventually selected as the name of the school district, was first suggested by teacher and coach, Gordon E. Knapp, based on the road the new school was being built on. On 13 November 1950, the students voted Red, White, and Blue as the district's colors and “Minutemen” was selected as the mascot based on the inspiration of the new name of the school.

The groundbreaking ceremony happened on 17 June 1951 and construction was initiated in August 1951. While the school was being built, high school students spent their days between Bath School and Richfield School.

In February 1952, the alma mater, Revere Revere, was chosen. The music was composed by Professor David T. Plank, and the words were written by his mother, Eulalia Plank. Publication of the Revere Lantern replaced the Bath School newspaper and the Richfield Echo. The yearbook, Revere Review, replaced the Bath Hi-Spy and the Richfield yearbook. It changed its name from the Revere Review to the Reverie in 1972.

From 1950 to 1952, there was a complete union of all school activities, functions, and faculty. While the school was being built, Carl Coffeen served as the superintendent and Roy M. Pugh, the former principal at Bath School, served as the principal. Upon moving into the consolidated building, Pugh served as superintendent and Harold Schweiserberger (the former Richfield School principal) served as principal of the high school. In 1955, Schweiserberger took over as superintendent and George Bayliss became the principal.

On 29 May 1952, the first graduating class of Revere held their commencement in the Richfield School auditorium. On 20 January 1953, all high school students moved into the new school. The official dedication of the school occurred on 21 March 1954 and the Revere PTA was formed on 31 March 1953, with L. Wyatt serving as the first president. The Revere Alumni Association (RAA) was formed in July 1953 by Mike McCoy, Wanda Bartholomew, and Craig Richmond. Starting in the fall of 1961, Revere High School became a 10-12 school after the freshmen began attending Eastview Junior High. RHS was later reformatted into a traditional high school for grades 9-12.

=== Facilities in previous building ===
Over the next several decades, the school underwent various building additions and modifications. There were a total of seven additions completed to the school in the years 1954, 1957, 1964, 1968, 1972, 1982, and 1995. The school had a gymnasium, auditorium, library, laboratory, and cafeteria. In 2016, voters approved a bond issue that would allow for the construction of a new Revere High School on the same property. At the time of the school's demolition in May 2020, the school had served the community for approximately 67 years. By the time of its demolition, the previous building had an area of 169,853 square feet and was located on 27.89 acres of land.

Gordon E. Knapp Memorial Addition

The RHS student council dedicated the new auditorium, main gym area, and multipurpose room to Gordon E. Knapp in 1981. Knapp was a teacher, coach, and principal who taught in the district from 1941 to 1980. The day before Knapp officially retired, he was involved in a fatal car crash on his way home. The Revere home for winter sports was originally the Richfield Gymnasium (the new high school did not originally have a gymnasium). The addition was completed in 1982.

Weight room

The weight room was initially known as the “Multi-Purpose Room” and hosted numerous activities. In 2000, the first weight room took shape with the wrestling program and a significant donation by Jerry Kusar. In 2007-2008, the informal weight room was made into a formal training area.

Gymnasium

The home for winter sports was the Richfield Gymnasium at Richfield School. In 1953, a gymnasium was added at the 1-year old RHS. In 1972, a new gymnasium was added while the old gym was converted to a library. In 1982, locker rooms and a multipurpose room were added. As part of the 1995 addition, a new library was constructed in the new wing and the old gymnasium was converted from a library back into a gymnasium, which was used for activities and a practice facility for the school's wrestling team.

1995 Addition

In 1992, a bond issue was passed to add a new two-story addition including a dedicated science wing with first-floor science classrooms that had laboratory spaces and a greenhouse, a new second-floor library, a photography room, and media/video production room. In addition to this entirely new wing, other areas in the building were renovated extensively, including the 1954 and 1968 additions that housed the main office and guidance offices; and the existing library was converted back into an auxiliary gymnasium as it had been prior to 1972. A small addition in the form of a hallway was constructed between the main gym and the auxiliary gym of the school in order to link the two gymnasiums to provide better accessibility.

The addition was designed by the architectural firm Lesko Associates of Cleveland. A groundbreaking ceremony for this addition was held on November 15, 1993. In addition to the high school addition and alterations, the bond issue also covered extensive renovations at both Revere Middle School and Hillcrest Elementary School. This addition to the high school was retained in the new building constructed in 2019; however, it was renovated to match the construction and flow with the rest of the new building.

== Current building (2020–present) ==
By 2015, the state of the existing high school building was deteriorating and it was determined that the costs associated with renovating the high school exceeded costs for new construction. On November 9, 2016, voters approved Bond Issue 45, which funded construction of a new Revere High School, new Bath Elementary School, with renovations to Hillcrest School (which was renamed Richfield Elementary in 2018) and Revere Middle School, construction of a new bus garage, and installation of new athletic fields and facilities.

Groundbreaking for the new high school was held in a ceremony with students, staff, administrators, and representatives from BHSM/Perkins + Will and the ICON Construction firm on September 21, 2018. The new building retained the library and science wing addition from 1995 which had been added onto the previous building. The Class of 2020 was the last graduating class to graduate from the existing high school (which at the time was closed due to the COVID-19 pandemic). Building demolition began in May 2020 and was completed in July 2020.

The new building was completed on September 8, 2020, and students began attending the new building at the start of the 2020-2021 school year. The current building is located on the same property, slightly adjacent to where the previous building stood. The new building features learning environments beyond the classroom space such as open, collaborative learning spaces (both open and small-group rooms) in each of the two academic wings of the school that can be utilized for projects or individual learning, a new conference and maker space area in the library, and an outdoor patio space with tables outside the cafeteria for outdoor student dining; in addition to a new gymnasium, weight room, cafeteria, STEM classroom, and auditorium. The Class of 2021 was the first graduating class to graduate from the new high school.

== Athletics ==
Prior to there being a Revere, there was Bath Buccaneers and the Richfield Rockets. The two different districts had a number of sports and actually competed against each other in the Summit County League. In 1950, in anticipation of the consolidation of the two schools, the two districts decided to combine football called Bath-Richfield football team that first year and Revere thereafter.

However, in basketball, the Richfield student body voted to delay the combining of the basketball teams until 1951 and in 1952, the permanent sports department was established with Kermit Smulbach serving as the athletic director and the team known as the Revere Minutemen. The school sponsored football, cheer leading, men's basketball, men's track, and baseball. Football, track, and baseball competition were held at Bath Field while basketball was held at Richfield gymnasium.

Girls at Revere, with the exception of cheer leading, did not have organized sports sponsored by the athletic department. But Bath and Richfield girls combined to become Revere's Y-Teens. Y-Teens (formerly Girl Reserves) is a club that is affiliated with the Youth Women's Christian Association (YMCA). There was 29 local high schools that had Y-Teen clubs. Revere girls first competed in swimming and basketball in 1952 and other sports were added through the years. In 1972-1973, girls' sports were added to suburban league competition.

Revere High School competes in the Suburban League American Division. They have been members since 1958 and are the second-longest active members of the league.

The football team plays its sixth game of the year against their rival Copley High School, and the winner gets possession of the Victory Bell Trophy.

Boys' soccer won the 2013 OHSAA state title in Division II and has runner-up finishes in 1995, 2010, 2011, 2016, and 2018.

== Notable alumni ==
- John "Derf" Backderf (born 1959), cartoonist. He is most famous for his graphic novel My Friend Dahmer.
- Jeffrey Dahmer (1960–1994), serial killer and cannibal.
- Kaitlyn Black (born 1983), actress, played Annabeth Nass in The CW comedy-drama series Hart of Dixie.
- Jerry Hollendorfer (born 1946), Thoroughbred horse racing owner/trainer.
- Vic Joseph (born 1985), professional wrestling commentator.
- Karen Leach, biochemist.
- Andy McCollum (born 1970), professional football player in the National Football League (NFL).
- Pete Nance (born 2000), professional basketball player in the NBA and NBA G League for the Milwaukee Bucks.
- Larry Nance Jr. (born 1993), professional basketball player in the NBA for the Indiana Pacers
- Karl Smesko (born 1970), head basketball coach for the Atlanta Dream of the WNBA.
- Ben Christman (2003-2025), former college football offensive lineman for The Ohio State University, University of Kentucky, and University of Nevada-Las Vegas.
