= Orlando Pace =

American football player (born 1975)

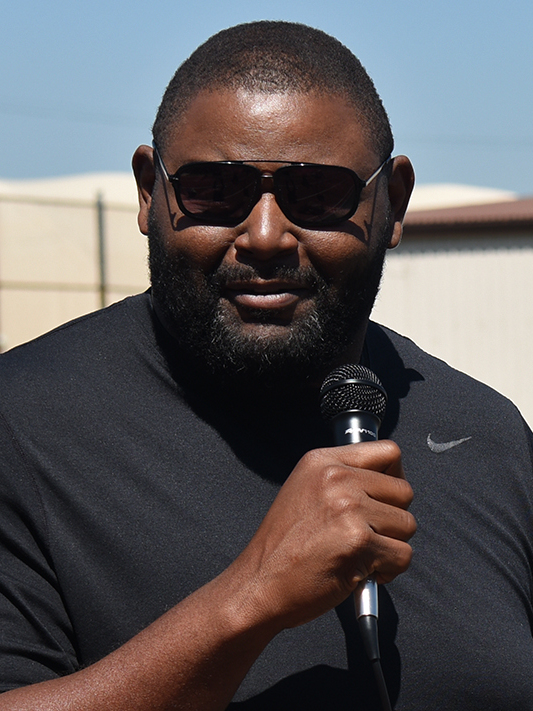
- Pace in 2018

No. 76
- Position: Offensive tackle

Personal information
- Born: November 4, 1975 (age 51); Sandusky, Ohio, U.S.
- Listed height: 6 ft 7 in (2.01 m)
- Listed weight: 325 lb (147 kg)

Career information
- High school: Sandusky
- College: Ohio State (1994–1996)
- NFL draft: 1997: 1st round, 1st overall pick

Career history
- St. Louis Rams (1997–2008); Chicago Bears (2009)

Awards and highlights
- Super Bowl champion (XXXIV); Pro Football Hall of Fame (2016); 3× First-team All-Pro (1999, 2001, 2003); 2× Second-team All-Pro (2000, 2004); 7× Pro Bowl (1999–2005); NFL 2000s All-Decade Team; Outland Trophy (1996); 2× Lombardi Award (1995, 1996); UPI Lineman of the Year (1996); Jim Parker Trophy (1996); 2× Unanimous All-American (1995, 1996); Big Ten Most Valuable Player (1996); Big Ten Offensive Player of the Year (1996); 2× Big Ten Offensive Lineman of the Year (1995, 1996); Big Ten Freshman of the Year (1994); 2× First-team All-Big Ten (1995, 1996); First-team AP All-Time All-American (2025)

Career NFL statistics
- Games played: 169
- Games started: 165
- Fumble recoveries: 7
- Stats at Pro Football Reference
- Pro Football Hall of Fame
- College Football Hall of Fame

Orlando Lamar Pace (born November 4, 1975) is an American former professional football offensive tackle who played in the National Football League (NFL) for 13 seasons, primarily with the St. Louis Rams. He played college football for the Ohio State Buckeyes, winning the Lombardi Award in 1995 after blocking for Eddie George during his Heisman campaign. The following season, Pace won the Outland Trophy, his second Lombardi Award, the Jim Parker Trophy, and UPI Lineman of the Year. Pace was selected first overall in the 1997 NFL draft by the Rams, where he spent all but one season of his professional career. This included being a member of the Greatest Show on Turf. In his final season, he was a member of the Chicago Bears.

With the Rams, Pace was recognized as the cornerstone of an offensive line that blocked for an offense with the most gross yardage, second-highest completion percentage, and fifth-most touchdown passes during his 12 years with the team. Under Pace's protection, the Rams passing offense compiled more than 3,000 yards per season in each of the years he played, seven different quarterbacks eclipsed 3,000 yards in a season, and seven players rushed for 1,000 yards. Pace also protected the league's Most Valuable Player (MVP) recipient for three consecutive seasons, blocking for 1999 and 2001 MVP Kurt Warner and 2000 MVP Marshall Faulk.

Retiring as a seven-time Pro Bowl and three-time first-team All-Pro selection, Pace was a core contributor of the Rams Greatest Show on Turf offense that won the franchise's first Super Bowl title in Super Bowl XXXIV. He was inducted to the College Football Hall of Fame in 2013 and the Pro Football Hall of Fame in 2016.

== Early life ==
Pace was born in Sandusky, Ohio. He was a two-sport athlete for the Sandusky Blue Streaks at Sandusky High School. He had a successful football career. He was named to the Parade magazine high school All-America team as an offensive lineman and the USA Today All-America team as a defensive lineman.

== College career ==
Pace attended Ohio State University, where he majored in business and played for the Buckeyes football teams from 1994 to 1996. He was only the second true freshman ever to start on opening day for the Buckeyes football team. He was a two-time unanimous All-American, and won the Outland Trophy in 1996 for the best college football interior lineman. He won the Lombardi Award for the best college lineman or linebacker in 1995 and 1996, becoming the only two-time winner of that award. He is one of only thirteen players to have won both the Outland Trophy and the Lombardi Award. He and Dave Rimington are the only three-time winners in the Outland/Lombardi category. He was a finalist for the 1996 Heisman Trophy, finishing fourth in the voting, the highest finish for a lineman (offense or defense) since University of Washington DT Steve Emtman in 1991, who also finished fourth. Pace also lined up at defensive tackle during some goal line situations during his junior year at Ohio State.

Pace was so dominant that the term pancake block—referring to when an offensive lineman knocks a defender on his back—gained popularity at Ohio State due to his play. He was nicknamed "The Pancake Man." Several other college teams have been using the term since the 1980s, most notably Nebraska. In fact, the Ohio State Athletic Department distributed Orlando Pace pancake magnets as a promotion for his Heisman Trophy run. Pace did not allow a sack in his last two years at Ohio State. Pace finished fourth in the Heisman trophy race in 1996, which was practically unheard of for an offensive lineman, and demonstrated his dominance at the college level.

In 1999, Pace was selected as a starting offensive tackle by Sports Illustrated in their "NCAA Football All-Century Team". The other starting offensive tackle on that list was Bill Fralic. Pace was one of five Ohio State Buckeyes on Sport Illustrated's All-Century Team 85-man roster; the others being Jim Parker, Archie Griffin, Chris Spielman, and Jack Tatum. In 2013, he was inducted into the College Football Hall of Fame.

== Professional career ==
Pre-draft measurables
| Height | Weight | Arm length | Hand span |
|---|---|---|---|
| 6 ft 6 7/8 in (2.00 m) | 334 lb (151 kg) | 36 1/4 in (0.92 m) | 10 3/4 in (0.27 m) |
All values from NFL Combine

=== St. Louis Rams ===
The Rams traded with the New York Jets for the first overall pick the day before the 1997 NFL draft. Pace was the first offensive lineman since Ron Yary in 1968 to be drafted first overall. After a three-week holdout, on August 15, 1997, Pace signed a seven-year $29.4 million contract that included a $6.3 million signing bonus. Pace played 13 games during the 1997 season, his rookie year. He made his first start against the Oakland Raiders on September 28, 1997, and started every game for the rest of the season.

In 1998, Pace started 16 games at the left tackle position and was named Pro Bowl alternate.

In the 1999 season, Pace played in 896 of 994 offensive plays and was selected to his first Pro Bowl. It was the first time that a Rams' offensive tackle was named to the Pro Bowl since Jackie Slater in 1990. Pace was also a First-team All-Pro for the Super Bowl winning Rams.

In the 2000 season, Pace earned second consecutive Pro Bowl invitation, starting all 16 regular season games and 1 playoff game. Pace was anchor of offensive line that helped offense produce most passing yards in NFL history, playing in 1,006 of possible 1,013 offensive plays (99.3 percent), second highest total on offensive line. Pace was one of three Rams' offensive linemen (C Andy McCollum, RT Ryan Tucker) who were not penalized for holding.

In 2001, Pace started every game for the fourth consecutive season. He played in 100 percent of offensive plays, joining Adam Timmerman as the only Ram to play in every offensive play. He started all three playoff contests, the St. Louis Rams claimed the NFC West title and advanced to Super Bowl XXXVI falling to the New England Patriots, 20–17. He earned a third consecutive Pro Bowl invitation.

In 2002, despite missing six games due to injury (three to calf injury in games 4–6 and three to hamstring games in 13–16), Pace earned his fourth consecutive Pro Bowl invitation.

Pace had a lengthy holdout by reporting to camp on August 26, 2003, and signing a one-year deal as the Rams franchise player. The deal was worth $5.7 million. In 2003, Pace started all 16 regular season games and one playoff game, he helped the Rams' offense to rank second in the NFL with an average of 27.9 points a game. He earned a fifth consecutive Pro Bowl invitation as the Rams claimed their third NFC West title in five years.

On September 5, 2004, Pace ended another holdout and signed the Rams' $7.02 million offer. It marked the second straight year Pace missed most or all of the preseason before signing his one-year tender. By designating Pace as a franchise player, the Rams were obligated to pay him the average salary of the five highest-paid offensive linemen in the NFL. Pace went on to start all 16 regular season games at left tackle and both playoff games. He was one of three linemen to start every game (C Andy McCollum, G Adam Timmerman) and blocked for an offense that ranked eighth in the NFL (third in the NFC) in first downs (321). Pace helped Rams convert 13-of-16 fourth down attempts, second highest fourth-down conversion percentage in the NFL (68.4%). He earned his sixth consecutive Pro Bowl invitation.

Pace was a free agent in 2005 and explored the possibility of signing with another team. The Rams placed the franchise tag on Pace again. In March, he visited the Houston Texans. The problem for Pace and the Texans was that if they work out an agreement, the Texans would have had to agree with the Rams on a compensation package, which would be two first-round draft choices which the Rams would be entitled to under the franchise-player rules. However, the day before the deadline, Pace accepted a seven-year, $52.9 million deal. The deal included $18 million in first-year salary and bonus.

In 2005, Pace earned seventh consecutive Pro Bowl invitation, tying him for fourth in Rams history, behind Hall of Famer DT Merlin Olsen (14), Hall of Famer G Tom Mack (11), and LB Les Richter (8). That season, Pace started all 16 games at left tackle, joining C Andy McCollum and G Adam Timmerman as only Rams linemen to start every game.

In 2006, Pace started the 8 games he appeared in until he left in the second quarter against the Seattle Seahawks on November 12, 2006, after he tore his triceps, ending his 2006 season. He was placed on Injured Reserve on November 14.

Pace was injured during the Rams' 2007 season opener against the Carolina Panthers on September 9, 2007. Officials confirmed that Pace would be out for the entire 2007 season, severely jeopardizing the Rams' offense for the remainder of the season.

In 2008, Pace played in and started 14 games, missing only two with an injury, compared to the 15 he missed in 2007 and the eight he missed in 2006. However, the Rams struggled on the field and their head coach Scott Linehan was fired mid-season and the team fared little better under interim head coach Jim Haslett and the team finished 2–14.

Dogged by injuries in recent seasons, Pace was released by the Rams on March 10, 2009, to save $6 million under the salary cap.

=== Chicago Bears ===
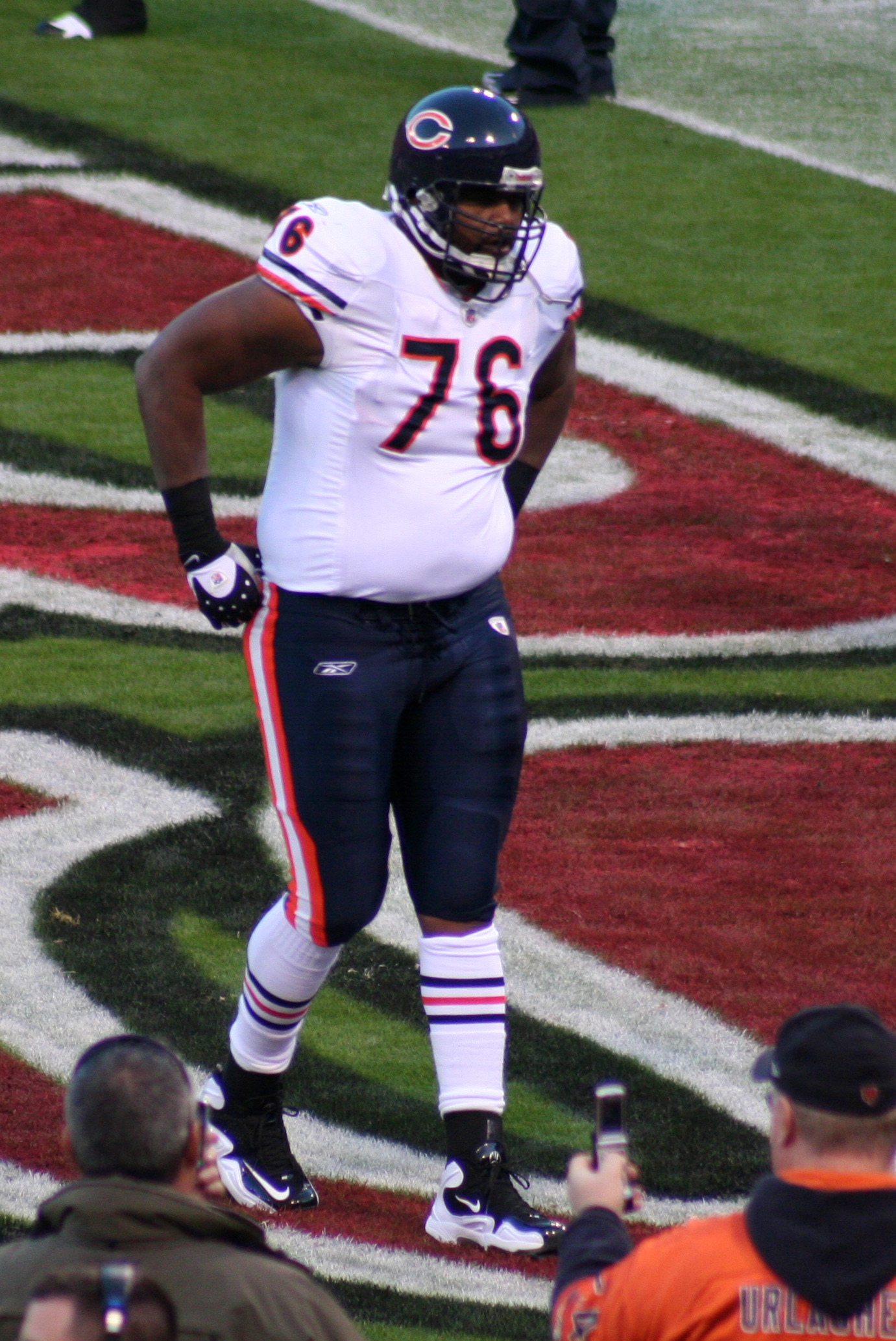
Pace with the Bears in 2009

Pace signed a three-year $15 million deal (with $6.1 million guaranteed) with the Chicago Bears on April 2, 2009. Pace started the first 11 games at left tackle in his lone season with the Bears in 2009 before sustaining a groin injury on November 29 in a loss to the Minnesota Vikings. He later finished the year as a reserve behind 2008 first-round draft pick Chris Williams. He was released on March 1, 2010.

== Personal life ==
Pace owned "Big O's Ltd" in his home town of Sandusky, Ohio. It was a family-friendly sports bar located on W. Perkins Avenue. Pace made appearances at his restaurant, occasionally signing autographs for his hometown fans. Big O's Ltd has since been closed.

Pace was inducted into the Rose Bowl Hall of Fame on December 30, 2013, at the Pasadena Convention Center.

Pace was a finalist in the 2015 Hall of Fame induction class and in his second year of eligibility he made the final 15. On February 6, 2016, he was elected to the Pro Football Hall of Fame.

Pace resides in St. Louis, Missouri. He and his family purchased a house in Henderson, NV in 2025. His son, Landon, currently plays tight end for Wyoming.

He was portrayed by Brandon Murphy in the 2021 film American Underdog: The Kurt Warner Story.
