= Matt McGorry =

American actor (born 1986)

- Born: Matthew David McGorry; April 12, 1986 (age 40); New York City, U.S.
- Education: Emerson College
- Occupations: Actor; activist
- Years active: 2006–present
- Height: 178 cm (5 ft 10 in)

Matthew David McGorry (born April 12, 1986) is an American actor. He is best known for playing John Bennett in the Netflix comedy-drama series Orange Is the New Black and Asher Millstone in the ABC legal thriller series How to Get Away with Murder.

== Early life and education ==
McGorry was born and raised in Manhattan, New York, and began performing at age nine. He attended Fiorello H. LaGuardia High School in New York, and then graduated from Emerson College in Boston, Massachusetts in 2008.

== Career ==
=== Fitness ===
McGorry began his career as a personal trainer, fitness writer for Men's Journal, and competitive bodybuilder.

=== Acting ===
On television, McGorry made his debut in 2011 on the ABC daytime soap opera One Life to Live. He later appeared in guest-starring roles on Person of Interest, Gossip Girl, and Royal Pains before breaking out in a recurring role from 2013 to 2015 on the Netflix dramedy series Orange Is the New Black as corrections officer John Bennett in 2013.

In 2014, McGorry was cast as series regular Asher Millstone on Shonda Rhimes' drama series How to Get Away with Murder, a role he played for 90 episodes up until 2020. In the same year, he was cast in the indie drama How He Fell in Love.

In 2022, McGorry starred as Mark Higgins for 8 episodes in Archive 81.

== Personal life ==
McGorry is heterosexual and polyamorous, but stated in a 2018 Man Talk roundtable that he had experimented with men when he was younger, adding, "like a lot of straight boys I experimented with other boys. But that is so common and no one talks about it [...] I don't think it was sexual, and I am straight, never found myself attracted to boys [...] I had so much shame about that, for years after, thinking 'I'm going to be famous one day, maybe, and someone's going to find and it's going to become this thing and it's going to destroy me."

McGorry is a police and prison abolitionist and a feminist and is interested in various social issues.

In 2024, McGorry revealed that he was diagnosed with long COVID.

== Filmography ==
=== Film ===
Year	Title	Role	Notes
2006	Thursday	Grey Malcolm	
2006	Gizor & Gorm	Gorm	Short film
2008	Killian	Duncan	Short film
2010	Public Access	Vlado	Short film
2010	Afghan Hound	Tom	
2015	Ratter	Michael	
2015	How He Fell in Love	Travis	
2015	Loserville	Coach Casey Harris	
2015	Say My Name	Dancer & Actor	Music video (by Peking Duk)
2018	Step Sisters	Dane	
2020	Uncorked	Harvard	
2020	Death of a Telemarketer	Andy	Also executive producer
2021	Good on Paper	Brett	

=== Television ===
Year	Title	Role	Notes
2011	One Life to Live	Spider Man	3 episodes
2011	Person of Interest	EMT No. 1	Episode: "Foe"
2012	Gossip Girl	Personal Shopper	Episode: "Crazy, Cupid, Love"
2012	Royal Pains	EMT	Episode: "You Give Love a Bad Name"
2013	Elementary	Officer Sam Klecko	Episode: "Details"
2013–15	Orange Is the New Black	John Bennett	28 episodes Screen Actors Guild Award for Outstanding Performance by an Ensemble in a Comedy Series
2014–20	How to Get Away with Murder	Asher Millstone	Main cast; season 1-6, 86 episodes
2015	Public Morals	Mr. Ford	Episode: "A Fine Line"
2017	Lip Sync Battle	Himself	Episode: "Matt McGorry vs. Bellamy Young"
2022	Archive 81	Mark Higgins	8 episodes
2022	Big Shot	Coach Blake	Episode: "Moving On"
