= Mark Blum =

American actor (1950–2020)

- Born: Mark Blum; May 14, 1950; Newark, New Jersey, U.S.
- Died: March 25, 2020 (aged 69); New York City, U.S.
- Education: University of Pennsylvania
- Occupation: Actor
- Years active: 1976–2020
- Known for: Desperately Seeking Susan; Crocodile Dundee; Mozart in the Jungle
- Spouse: Janet Zarish (m. 2005)

Mark Blum (May 14, 1950 – March 25, 2020) was an American actor who worked in theater, film, and television. He found success with a supporting role in the 1985 film Desperately Seeking Susan, which he followed up the next year with another supporting role in Crocodile Dundee. On the stage, Blum won an Obie Award for his role in the play Gus and Al during its 1988–1989 season.

Near the end of his career, Blum had a regularly recurring role on the Amazon Prime series Mozart in the Jungle from 2014 to 2018. He also made guest appearances on dozens of shows throughout his career.

== Early life ==
Blum was born in Newark, New Jersey, to Lorraine (née Fink) and Morton Blum, who worked in the insurance industry. His family was Jewish. He grew up in Maplewood, New Jersey, and graduated from Columbia High School in 1968 and was inducted into the school's hall of fame in 2012. He then went on to graduate from the University of Pennsylvania.

== Career ==
Blum started acting on stage in the 1970s. In the 1980s, he acted in the movies Lovesick (1983), Desperately Seeking Susan (1985), Just Between Friends (1986), Crocodile Dundee (1986), Blind Date (1987), and The Presidio (1988). He later appeared in Coin Heist (2017).

On television, he co-starred in Sweet Surrender in 1987. He also appeared on the following programs: Capital News in 1990, Frasier in 1997, and NYPD Blue in 1999. From 2014 to 2018, he appeared in Mozart in the Jungle.

Blum won an Obie Award for his performance as Al in the Playwrights Horizons production of Albert Innaurato's play, Gus and Al, during the 1988–1989 season. On Broadway, he appeared in Neil Simon's Lost in Yonkers, Gore Vidal's The Best Man, and Richard Greenberg's The Assembled Parties. In 2013, he appeared as Max in the Primary Stages production of The Model Apartment. Blum was on the faculty of HB Studio in New York City.

In 2018, Blum was cast in a recurring role as Ivan Mooney in the former Lifetime thriller series You. He regularly acted at Playwrights Horizons, an off-Broadway theater in New York City. Blum frequently appeared on Broadway, including in the revival of Twelve Angry Men. His recent Broadway credits included The Assembled Parties, Gore Vidal's The Best Man—twice—and Neil Simon's Lost in Yonkers.

Blum was active in the Screen Actors Guild, having served on the New York and national boards.

== Personal life and death ==
Blum was married to actress Janet Zarish, who appeared on television as Natalie Bannon on As the World Turns and as Lee Halpern on One Life to Live.

Blum died from complications associated with COVID-19 at New York–Presbyterian Hospital on March 25, 2020, aged 69, during the COVID-19 pandemic in New York City. Upon his passing, Madonna (who had starred with Blum in 'Desperately Seeking Susan') posted several photos of her with Blum from the film, and issued a statement on March 28, 2020 stating: " "I want to acknowledge the passing of a remarkable human, fellow actor and friend Mark Blum, who succumbed to Coronavirus. This is really tragic and my heart goes out to him, his family and his loved ones. I remember him as funny warm, loving, and professional when we made 'Desperately Seeking Susan' in 1985!! Another reminder that this virus is no joke, nothing to be casual about or pretend won't affect us in some way. We need to stay grateful -be hopeful- help each other-and follow the quarantine rules!" The season 3 premieres of You and Succession were dedicated to Blum's memory, as well as the second episode of the fifth season of Billions.

== Filmography ==
=== Film ===
Year	Title	Role	Notes	Ref.
1983	Lovesick	Intern Murphy	Romantic comedy film written and directed by Marshall Brickman	
1985	Desperately Seeking Susan	Gary Glass		
1986	Just Between Friends	George Margolin		
1986	Crocodile Dundee	Richard Mason		
1987	Blind Date	Denny Gordon		
1988	The Presidio	Arthur Peale		
1989	Worth Winning	Ned Broudy		
1993	Emma and Elvis	Ben Winchek		
1995	Miami Rhapsody	Peter		
1995	The Low Life	Matthew Greenbert		
1995	Denise Calls Up	Dr. Brennan, Obstetrician		
1996	Sudden Manhattan	Louis		
1997	Stag	Ben Marks		
1998	You Can Thank Me Later	Edward Cooperberg		
1999	Getting to Know You	Darrell		
2000	Down to You	The Interviewer		
2003	Shattered Glass	Lewis Estridge		
2007	The Warrior Class	Hal Richardson		
2010	Step Up 3D	NYU Professor		
2011	The Green	Stuart		
2011	I Don't Know How She Does It	Lew Reddy		
2013	Blumenthal	Saul		
2015	How He Fell in Love	Henry		
2016	No Pay, Nudity	Leon		
2017	Coin Heist	Mr. Smerconish		
2019	Love Is Blind	Dr. Klienart		
2019	Human Capital	Rex		
2020	Sister of the Groom	Nat	Posthumous release	

=== Television ===
Year	Title	Role	Notes
1984	St. Elsewhere	Dr. Vogel	Episode: "Two Balls and a Strike"
1987	Sweet Surrender	Ken Holden	6 episodes
1987	Miami Vice	Sid Shenker	Episode: "Contempt of Court"
1990	Capital News	Edison King	13 episodes
1991	Roseanne	Mike Summers	Episode: "Aliens"
1992	Condition Critical	Dr. Howard Zuckerman	TV movie
1993	NYPD Blue	Dr. Roland Sachs	Episode: "From Hare to Eternity"
1993–1998	Law & Order	Brooklyn A.D.A. Frank Lazar	2 episodes
1995	Indictment: The McMartin Trial	Wayne Satz	TV movie
1995	New York Undercover	Dr. Vincent	Episode: "The Highest Bidder"
1995	C.P.W.	Ben	5 episodes
1995	Law & Order	Michael Aronson	Episode: "Seed"
1996	Wings	Larry Mohr	Episode: "What About Larry"
1996–1999	NYPD Blue	FBI Agent Mike Francis	2 episodes
1997	Ink	Greg Armstrong	Episode: "Face Off"
1997	Frasier	John	Episode: "The 1000th Show"
1999	The Sopranos	Randall Curtin	Episode: "Meadowlands"
1999	The West Wing	Rep. Katzenmoyer	Episode: "Five Votes Down"
2000	Family Law	Russell Hollenbeck	Episode: "Stealing Home"
2001	Deadline	Rabbi Jonathan Ahrenthal	Episode: "The First Commandment"
2001	Ed	Arnold Bancroft	Episode: "Goodbye Sadie"
2002	The Practice	State's Atty. Michael Scannel	Episode: "Evil/Doers"
2003	Law & Order: Criminal Intent	Dr. Philip Oliver	Episode: "Con-Text"
2004	CSI: Miami	Jim Rennert	Episode: "Deadline"
2004	Judging Amy	Richard Kinrich	Episode: "Slade's Chophouse"
2006	Law & Order: Criminal Intent	Professor Larry Lewis	Episode: "Proud Flesh"
2008	New Amsterdam	Dr. MacVittie	Episode: "Soldier's Heart"
2008	Fringe	Dr. Claus Penrose	Episode: "The Same Old Story"
2009	Law & Order	Expert Doctor	Episode: "Dignity"
2009	Mercy	Dr. Austin	Episode: "I'm Not That Kind of Girl"
2010	The Good Wife	Julius Kreutzer	Episode: "Unplugged"
2011	Jesse Stone: Innocents Lost	Dr. Parkinson	TV movie
2011	Law & Order: Special Victims Unit	David Arnoff	Episode: "Personal Fouls"
2012	Pan Am	Captain Jackson	Episode: "1964"
2014–2018	Mozart in the Jungle	Union Bob	30 episodes
2016	The Blacklist	Noah Shuster	Episode: "Lady Ambrosia (No. 77)"
2017	Difficult People	Rabbi Schecter	Episode: "Fuzz Buddies"
2018	You	Mr. Mooney	4 episodes
2018	Elementary	Ira Langstrom	Episode: "Bits and Pieces"
2018–2019	Succession	Bill Lockhart	2 episodes
2019	The Good Fight	Julius Kreutzer	Episode: "The One Where the Sun Comes Out"
2020	Almost Family	Dr. Lewis	Episode: "Generational AF"
2020	Tommy	Jacob Fulton	2 episodes, posthumous release
2020	Billions	Dr. Mark Rutenberg	1 episode, posthumous release

=== Video games ===
Year	Title	Role
2000	Smuggler's Run	Gordon Temple
2010	Alan Wake	Maurice Horton, Dr. Emil Hartman, Dr. Barclay Colvin
