= Richfield, Ohio =

- Village
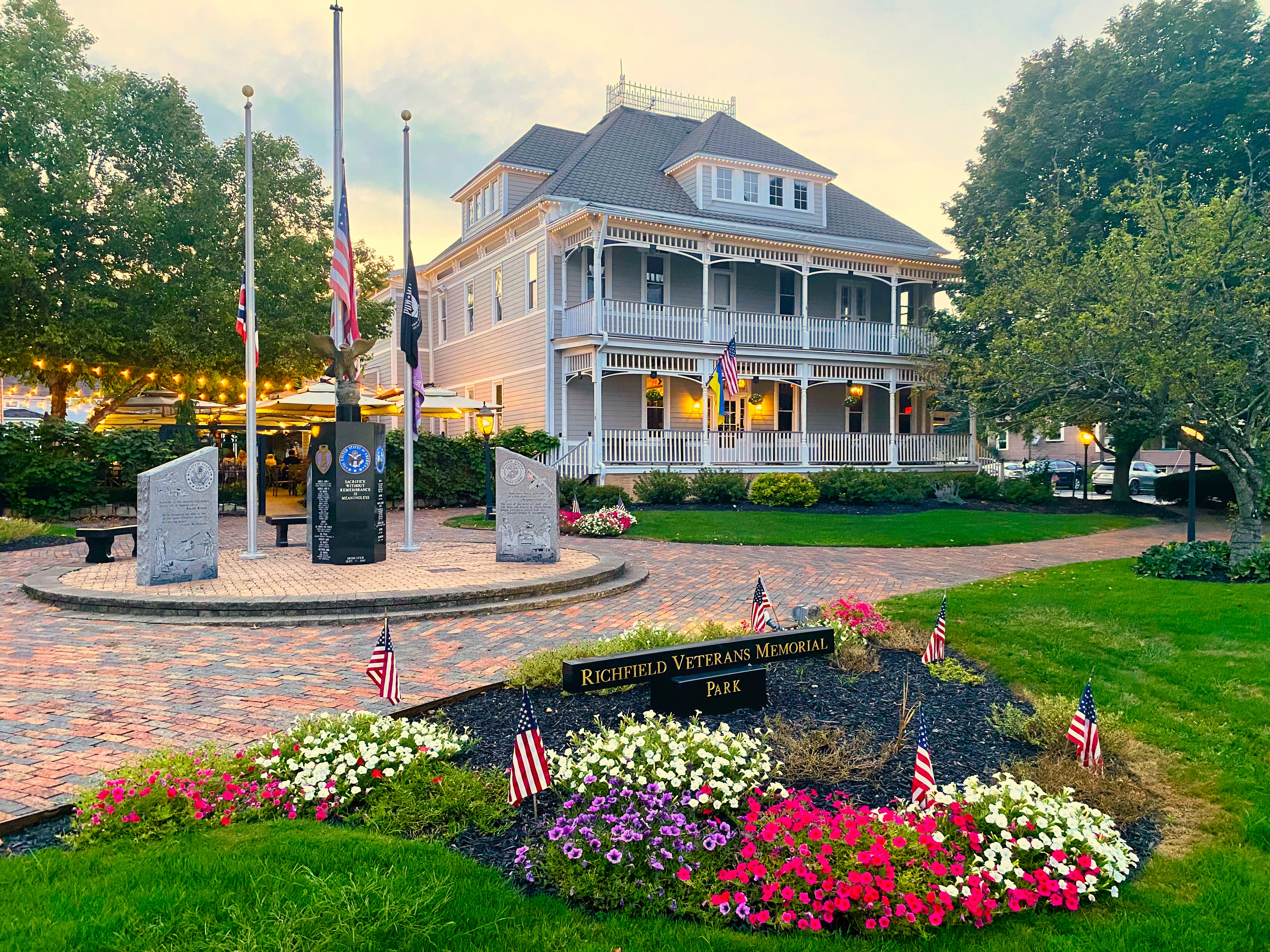
- Veterans Memorial Park with Taverne of Richfield behind it.

- Location in Summit County and the state of Ohio.
- Coordinates: 41°14′30″N 81°37′46″W
- Country: United States
- State: Ohio
- County: Summit
- Incorporated: 1967

Area
  - Total: 9.25 sq mi (23.97 km^{2})
  - Land: 9.25 sq mi (23.96 km^{2})
  - Water: 0.0039 sq mi (0.01 km^{2})
- Elevation: 1,188 ft (362 m)

Population (2020)
  - Total: 3,729
  - Density: 403.1/sq mi (155.64/km^{2})
- Time zone: UTC-5 (Eastern (EST))
  - Summer (DST): UTC-4 (EDT)
- ZIP code: 44286
- Area code: 330
- FIPS code: 39-66530
- GNIS feature ID: 2399063
- Website: https://www.richfieldvillageohio.org

Richfield is a village in Summit County, Ohio, United States. The population was 3,729 at the 2020 census. It is located midway between Akron and Cleveland and is part of the Akron metropolitan area.

== History ==
Richfield was founded in 1809 and incorporated in 1967. The village was named for the richness of their soil.

In 1970, Mayor Kenneth Swan signed an ordinance declaring Richfield Village the first "world city" in the United States.

Richfield was the home of the Cleveland Cavaliers of the NBA from 1974 until 1994 and the Cleveland Barons of the NHL from 1976 to 1978. Both teams played at the Richfield Coliseum.

== Geography ==
According to the United States Census Bureau, the village has a total area of 9.32 square miles (24.14 km^{2}), all land.

== Demographics ==
Historical population
Census	Pop.	Note	%±
1970	3,228		—
1980	3,437		6.5%
1990	3,117		−9.3%
2000	3,286		5.4%
2010	3,648		11.0%
2020	3,729		2.2%
U.S. Decennial Census

=== 2020 census ===
As of the 2020 census, Richfield had a population of 3,729. The median age was 50.2 years. 17.9% of residents were under the age of 18 and 23.3% were 65 years of age or older. For every 100 females, there were 101.3 males, and for every 100 females age 18 and over, there were 100.7 males age 18 and over.

57.5% of residents lived in urban areas, while 42.5% lived in rural areas.

There were 1,469 households in Richfield, of which 25.6% had children under the age of 18 living in them. Of all households, 62.0% were married-couple households, 15.8% were households with a male householder and no spouse or partner present, and 17.0% were households with a female householder and no spouse or partner present. About 21.2% of all households were made up of individuals, and 10.9% had someone living alone who was 65 years of age or older.

There were 1,534 housing units, of which 4.2% were vacant. The homeowner vacancy rate was 0.2% and the rental vacancy rate was 6.5%.

Richfield racial composition
Race	Number	Percentage
White (NH)	3,352	89.9%
Black or African American (NH)	48	1.29%
Native American (NH)	1	0.03%
Asian (NH)	84	2.25%
Pacific Islander (NH)	0	0%
Other/mixed	191	5.12%
Hispanic or Latino	53	1.42%

=== 2010 census ===
At the 2010 census there were 3,648 people, 1,384 households, and 1,049 families living in the village. The population density was 391.4 inhabitants per square mile (151.1/km^{2}). There were 1,471 housing units at an average density of 157.8 units per square mile (60.9 units/km^{2}). The racial makeup of the village was 96.8% White, 0.7% African American, 0.1% Native American, 1.4% Asian, and 1.0% from two or more races. Hispanic or Latino of any race were 0.6%.

Of the 1,384 households 32.6% had children under the age of 18 living with them, 63.2% were married couples living together, 7.9% had a female householder with no husband present, 4.6% had a male householder with no wife present, and 24.2% were non-families. 20.7% of households were one person and 8.3% were one person aged 65 or older. The average household size was 2.57 and the average family size was 2.99.

The median age in the village was 46.4 years. 23.4% of residents were under the age of 18; 5.5% were between the ages of 18 and 24; 18.6% were from 25 to 44; 34.7% were from 45 to 64; and 17.8% were 65 or older. The gender makeup of the village was 50.4% male and 49.6% female.

=== 2000 census ===
At the 2000 census there were 3,286 people, 1,227 households, and 952 families living in the village. The population density was 387.1 inhabitants per square mile (149.5/km^{2}). There were 1,272 housing units at an average density of 149.8 units per square mile (57.8 units/km^{2}). The racial makeup of the village was 97.35% White, 0.49% African American, 0.30% Native American, 1.31% Asian, 0.03% Pacific Islander, 0.06% from other races, and 0.46% from two or more races. Hispanic or Latino of any race were 0.24%.

Of the 1,227 households 31.9% had children under the age of 18 living with them, 67.2% were married couples living together, 7.2% had a female householder with no husband present, and 22.4% were non-families. 19.1% of households were one person and 8.1% were one person aged 65 or older. The average household size was 2.61 and the average family size was 2.99.

The age distribution was 23.6% under the age of 18, 5.1% from 18 to 24, 26.0% from 25 to 44, 28.2% from 45 to 64, and 17.1% 65 or older. The median age was 43 years. For every 100 females there were 98.2 males. For every 100 females age 18 and over, there were 95.3 males.

The median household income was $82,955 and the median family income was $91,955. Males had a median income of $51,052 versus $30,431 for females. The per capita income for the village was $32,888. About 3.3% of families and 3.5% of the population were below the poverty line, including 1.6% of those under age 18 and 6.7% of those age 65 or over.

== Education ==
Revere High School serves the area. The Lantern is its student newspaper. Richfield has a public library, a branch of the Akron-Summit County Public Library.

== Notable people ==
- William Cullen Wilcox (1850–1928) An American missionary to South Africa.

== Sister cities ==
Richfield is the sister city of Wolfach, Germany.
