= List of horror films of 1987 =

This is a list of horror films released in 1987.

Title	Director(s)	Cast	Country	Notes	Ref.
Aenigma	Lucio Fulci	Jared Martin, Lara Naszinsky	Italy		
Angel Heart	Alan Parker	Mickey Rourke, Robert De Niro, Lisa Bonet	United States		
Anguish	Bigas Luna	Zelda Rubinstein, Michael Lerner, Talia Paul	Spain		
Backwoods	Dean Crow	Brad Armacost, Dick Kreusser	United States		
Bad Taste	Peter Jackson	Terry Potter, Peter Vere-Jones, Michael Gooch	New Zealand		
Bates Motel	Richard Rothstein	Bud Cort, Lori Petty	United States	Television spin-off of Psycho franchise and direct sequel to first film	
Bay Coven	Carl Schenkel	Pamela Sue Martin, Tim Matheson, Barbara Billingsley	United States	Alternative title(s): Bay Cove; Eye of the Demon; Strangers in Town; The Devils of Bay Cove	
Beaks: The Movie	René Cardona Jr.	Christopher Atkins, Michelle Johnson, Sonia Infante	Mexico		
The Believers	John Schlesinger	Martin Sheen, Helen Shaver, Robert Loggia	United States		
Berserker	Jef Richard	Joseph Alan Johnson, Greg Dawson, Valerie Sheldon	United States		
Billy the Kid and the Green Baize Vampire	Alan Clarke	Louise Gold, Alun Armstrong, Eve Ferret	United States		
Blood Diner	Jackie Kong	Rick Burks, Carl Crew, LaNette La France	United States		
Blood Frenzy	Hal Freeman	Wendy MacDonald, Tony Montero, Claire Cassano	United States		
Blood Harvest	Bill Rebane	Tiny Tim, Itonia Salchek, Albert Jaggard	United States		
Blood Hook	Jim Mallon	Mark Jacobs, Lisa Todd, Patrick Danz	United States		
Blood Lake	Tim Boggs	Tiny Frazier, Angela Darter	United States		
Blood Rage	John Grissmer	Louise Lasser, Mark Soper, Marianne Kanter	United States	Alternative title(s): Nightmare at Shadow Woods	
Blood Sisters	Roberta Findlay	Amy Brentano, Shannon McMahon, John Fasano	United States		
Bloody New Year	Norman J. Warren	Suzy Aitchison, Nikki Brooks, Steve Wilsher	United Kingdom		
Bloody Wednesday	Mark G. Gilhuis	Jeff O'Haco, Pamela Baker, Dale E. Turner	United States	Alternative title(s): The Great American Massacre	
Blue Monkey	William Fruet	Steve Railsback, Gwynyth Walsh, Susan Anspach	Canada; United States		
Cannibal Hookers	Donald Farmer	Drew Godderis, Sky Nicholas, Katina Garner	United States		
The Carrier	Nathan J. White	Gregory Fortescue, Stevie Lee	United States		
Cassandra	Colin Eggleston	Tessa Humphries, Briony Behets, Natalie McCurry	Australia		
A Chinese Ghost Story	Ching Siu Tung	Leslie Cheung, Wong Tsu Hsien, Wu Ma	Hong Kong		
Creepozoids	David DeCoteau	Linnea Quigley, Ashlyn Gere, Joi Wilson	United States		
Creepshow 2	Michael Gornik	Lois Chiles, George Kennedy, Dorothy Lamour	United States		
The Curse	David Keith	Wil Wheaton, Claude Akins, Malcolm Danare	United States		
Dark Age	Arch Nicholson	Janet Kingsbury, John Jarratt, Nikki Coghill	Australia		
Dead of Winter	Arthur Penn	Mary Steenburgen, Roddy McDowall	United States		
Demon of Paradise	Cirio H. Santiago	David Anderson, Joe Mari Avellana, Leslie Scarborough	Philippines; United States		
Deranged	Chuck Vincent	Jane Hamilton, Paul Siederman, Jennifer Delora	United States		
Digital Devil Story: Megami Tensei	Mizuho Nishikubo		Japan	Anime film	
Dolls	Stuart Gordon	Ian Patrick Williams, Carolyn Purdy-Gordon, Hilary Mason	United States		
Doom Asylum	Richard Friedman	Patty Mullen, Ruth Collins, Kristin Davis	United States		
Epidemic	Lars von Trier	Allan De Waal, Ole Ernst, Michael Gelting	Denmark		
Epitaph	Joseph Merhi	Paula Jamison, Liz Kane	United States		
Evil Cat	Dennis Yu	Mark Cheng	Hong Kong		
Evil Dead II	Sam Raimi	Bruce Campbell, Scott Spiegel, Ted Raimi	United States		
Evil Spawn	Fred Olen Ray, Kenneth J. Hall, Ted Newsom	Bobbi Bresee, Suzanne Ager, Michael Deak	United States		
Evil Town	Edward Collins, Larry Spiegel	James Keach, Michele Marsh, Doria Cook	United States		
The Falling	Deran Sarafian	Dennis Christopher, Martin Hewitt, Lynn-Holly Johnson	United States; Spain	Alternative title(s): Alien Predator; Mutant 2	
Forever Evil	Roger Evans	Tracey Huffman, Howard Jacobsen, Kent Johnson	United States		
From a Whisper to a Scream	Jeff Burr	Vincent Price, Clu Gulager, Nicos Argentiogorgis	United States	Alternative title(s): The Offspring	
The Gate	Tibor Takács	Stephen Dorff, Christa Denton	Canada; United States		
Ghost Riders	Alan Stewart	Mike Ammons, Beverly Cleveland, James Desmarais	United States		
Ghoulies II	Albert Band	Damon Martin, Royal Dano, Phil Fondacaro	United States	Second film of Ghoulies film series	
Graveyard Disturbance	Lamberto Bava	Gregory Lech Thaddeus, Lea Martino, Beatrice Ring	Italy	Television film	
Grotesque	Joe Tornatore	Linda Blair	United States		
Happy New Year	John G. Avildsen	Peter Falk, Charles Durning, Tom Courtenay, Wendy Hughes	United States		
Hell High	Douglas Grossman	Christopher Stryker, Maureen Mooney, Christopher Cousins	United States		
Hello Mary Lou: Prom Night II	Bruce Pittman	Michael Ironside, Wendy Lyon, Justin Louis	Canada		
Hellraiser	Clive Barker	Andrew Robinson, Clare Higgins, Ashley Laurence	United Kingdom		
The Hidden	Jack Sholder	Kyle MacLachlan, Michael Nouri, Richard Brooks, Claudia Christian, Chris Mulkey, William Boyett, David Schwimmer, Clarence Felder, Clu Gulager, Ed O'Ross, Steve Eastin, Katherine Cannon, Larry Cedar, James Luisi, Danny Trejo, Lin Shaye	United States		
House II: The Second Story	Ethan Wiley	Arye Gross, Jonathan Stark, Royal Dano	United States		
Howling III	Philippe Mora	Barry Otto, William Yang, Imogen Annesley	Australia	Alternative title(s): Howling III: The Marsupials; The Marsupials: Howling III	
It's Alive III: Island of the Alive	Larry Cohen	Laurene Landon, Michael Moriarty, Karen Black	United States		
Jack's Back	Rowdy Herrington	James Spader, Cynthia Gibb, Robert Picardo	United States		
Jaws: The Revenge	Joseph Sargent	Lorraine Gary, Lance Guest, Michael Caine	United States	Final film of Jaws franchise	
Killing Birds	Joe D'Amato, Claudio Lattanzi	James Villemaire, Lara Wendel, Robert Vaughn	Italy		
Killing Spree	Tim Ritter	Rachel Rutz, Asbestos Felt, Courtney Lercara	United States		
The Kindred	Stephen Carpenter	Talia Balsam, Rod Steiger, Amanda Pays	United States		
The Lost Boys	Joel Schumacher	Corey Haim, Jason Patric, Kiefer Sutherland, Dianne Wiest, Corey Feldman, Jamison Newlander, Jami Gertz, Ed Herrmann, Barnard Hughes, Brooke McCarter, Billy Wirth, Alexander Winter, Kelly Jo Minter, Tim Cappello	United States		
Lucifer	John Eyres	Emma Sutton, Frank Rozelaar-Green, Jared Morgan	United Kingdom	Alternative title(s): Goodnight, God Bless	
Mindkiller	Michael Krueger	Wade Kelley, Dawn Jacobs, Daniel Selby	United States		
Mirror of Death	Deryn Warren	John Reno, Julie Merrill, Aarin Teich	United States		
The Monster Squad	Fred Dekker	Andre Gower, Robby Kiger, Stephen Macht	United States		
Monster in the Closet	Bob Dahlin	Donald Grant, Denise Du Barry, Claude Akins	United States		
Moon in Scorpio	Gary Graver	Britt Ekland, John Phillip Law, William Smith	United States		
Munchies	Tina Hirsch	Harvey Korman, Charles Stratton, Alix Elias	United States	First film of Munchies film series	
My Best Friend Is a Vampire	Jimmy Huston	LeeAnne Locken, Cheryl Pollak, Fannie Flagg	United States		
Near Dark	Kathryn Bigelow	Adrian Pasdar, Bill Paxton, Jenette Goldstein	United States		
Necropolis	Bruce Hickey	LeeAnne Baker, Michael Conte, Jacquie Fitz	United States		
Nekromantik	Jörg Buttgereit	Daktari Lorenz, Beatrice Manowski	West Germany		
The Newlydeads	Joseph Merhil	Rebecca Barrington, Michelle Mania, Scott Kaske	United States		
Night Screams	Allen Plone	Megan Wyss, Randy Lundsford, Janette Caldwell	United States		
Night Vision	Michael Krueger	Tony Carpenter, Stacy Carson, Daniel Selby	United States		
Nightflyers	Robert Collector	Catherine Mary Stewart, Michael Praed, Helene Udy	United States		
A Nightmare on Elm Street 3: Dream Warriors	Chuck Russell	Heather Langenkamp, Patricia Arquette, Laurence Fishburne	United States	Third film of A Nightmare on Elm Street franchise	
Nightmare Sisters	David DeCoteau	Linnea Quigley, Brinke Stevens, Michelle Bauer	United States		
Open House	Jag Mundhra	Joseph Bottoms, Adrienne Barbeau	United States		
Opera	Dario Argento	Christina Marsillach, Urbano Barberini	Italy		
The Outing	Tom Daley	Deborah Winters, James Huston, Andra St. Ivanyi	United States	Alternative title(s): The Lamp	
Predator	John McTiernan	Arnold Schwarzenegger, Carl Weathers	United States		
Prince of Darkness	John Carpenter	Donald Pleasence, Victor Wong, Jameson Parker	United States		
Prison	Renny Harlin	Viggo Mortensen, Chelsea Field, Lane Smith	United States		
Psychos in Love	Gorman Bechard	Carmine Capobianco, Debi Thibeault	United States		
Rat Man	Anthony Ascot	Nelson de la Rosa, Werner Pochath, David Warbeck	Italy		
Redneck Zombies	Pericles Lewnes		United States		
Reflections	Goran Marković	Anica Dobra, Mustafa Nadarevic, Milorad Mandic	Yugoslavia; United Kingdom		
Rest in Pieces	José Ramón Larraz	Scott Thompson Baker, Lorin Jean Vail	Spain; United States		
Retribution	Guy Magar	Dennis Lipscomb, Leslie Wing	United States		
Return to Horror High	Bill Froehlich	Vince Edwards, Scott Jacoby, Lori Lethin	United States		
A Return to Salem's Lot	Larry Cohen	Michael Moriarty, Andrew Duggan, Samuel Fuller	United States		
Rock 'n' Roll Nightmare	John Fasano	Jon Mikl Thor, Jillian Peri, Frank Dietz	Canada		
Rosa Mistica	Emmanuel Borlaza	Snooky Serna, Gabby Concepcion, Aga Muhlach	Philippines		
Scared Stiff	Richard Friedman	David Ramsey	United States		
Shallow Grave	Richard Styles	Tony March, Carol Cadby, Tom Law	United States		
Silent Night, Deadly Night Part 2	Lee Harry	Eric Freeman, James Newman	United States	Second film of Silent Night, Deadly Night film series	
Slaughterhouse	Rick Roessler	Sherry Bendorf, Don Barrat	United States		
Slumber Party Massacre 2	Deborah Brock	Crystal Bernard, Jennifer Rhodes	United States		
Specters	Marcello Avallone	John Pepper, Trine Michelsen, Donald Pleasence	Italy		
Stage Fright	Michele Soavi	David Brandon, Barbara Cupisti, Domenico Fiore	Italy	Alternative title(s): Aquarius; Bloody Bird; Deliria; Sound Stage Massacre	
The Stay Awake	John Bernard	Shirley Jane Harris, Tanya Gordon, Jayne Hutton	South Africa		
The Stepfather	Joseph Ruben	Terry O'Quinn, Jill Schoelen, Shelley Hack	United States		
The Stepford Children	Alan J. Levi	Barbara Eden, Don Murray, Tammy Lauren	United States	Television film	
The Stranger	Adolfo Aristarain	Bonnie Bedelia, Peter Riegert	United States		
Street Trash	J. Michael Muro	Mike Lackey, Vic Noto	United States		
Tagos Ng Dugo	Maryo J. de los Reyes	Vilma Santos, Michael De Mesa, Miguel Rodriguez	Philippines		
Terror Night	Nick Marino, Andre De Toth	Alan Hale, Jr., Aldo Ray, Michelle Bauer	United States	Alternative title(s): Bloody Movie	
Twisted Nightmare	Paul Hunt	Rhonda Gray, Cleve Hall	United States		
Vicious Lips	Albert Pyun	Angela O'Neill, Tanya Papanicolas, Eric Bartsch	United States		
The Video Dead	Robert Scott	Roxanna Augesen, Rocky Duvall	United States		
Wicked City	Yoshiaki Kawajiri	Yūsaku Yara, Toshiko Fujita, Ichirō Nagai	Japan	Anime film	
Zombie Death House	Nick Marino, John Saxon	Dennis Cole, Anthony Franciosa, Joe Zimmerman	United States		
Zombie High	Ron Link	Virginia Madsen, Sherilyn Fenn	United States		

== Sources ==
- Albright, Brian (2012). Regional Horror Films, 1958-1990: A State-by-State Guide with Interviews. Jefferson, North Carolina: McFarland. ISBN 978-1-476-60042-0.
- Borseti, Francesco (2016). It Came from the 80s! Interviews with 124 Cult Filmmakers. Jefferson, North Carolina: McFarland. ISBN 978-1-476-66604-4.
- Curti, Roberto (2019). Italian Gothic Horror Films, 1980-1989. Jefferson, North Carolina: McFarland. ISBN 978-1476672434.
- Dendle, Peter (2010). The Zombie Movie Encyclopedia. Jefferson, North Carolina: McFarland. ISBN 978-0-7864-9288-6.
- Hallenbeck, Bruce G. (2009). Comedy-Horror Films: A Chronological History, 1914-2008. Jefferson, North Carolina: McFarland. ISBN 978-0-786-45520-1.
- Hardy, Phil, ed. (1995). The Overlook Film Encyclopedia. Vol. 3. Overlook Press. ISBN 0-87951-624-0.
- Muir, John Kenneth (2010). Horror Films of the 1980s. Jefferson, North Carolina: McFarland. ISBN 978-0-786-45501-0.
- Shelley, Peter (2012). Australian Horror Films, 1973-2010. Jefferson, North Carolina: McFarland. ISBN 978-0-786-46167-7.
- Stanley, John (1989). Revenge of the Creature Features Movie Guide: An A to Z Encyclopedia to the Cinema of the Fantastic, Or, Is There a Mad Doctor in the House. Pacifica, California: Creatures at Large Press. ISBN 978-0-940-06404-1.
- Stine, Scott Aaron (2003). The Gorehound's Guide to Splatter Films of the 1980s. Jefferson, North Carolina: McFarland. ISBN 978-1-476-61132-7.
- Weldon, Michael (1996). The Psychotronic Video Guide To Film. New York City, New York: Macmillan. ISBN 978-0-312-13149-4.
- Young, R. G. (2000). The Encyclopedia of Fantastic Film: Ali Baba to Zombies. Hal Leonard Corporation. ISBN 1-55783-269-2.
