= California Institute of Abnormalarts =

Nightclub and museum in California, US

- CIA
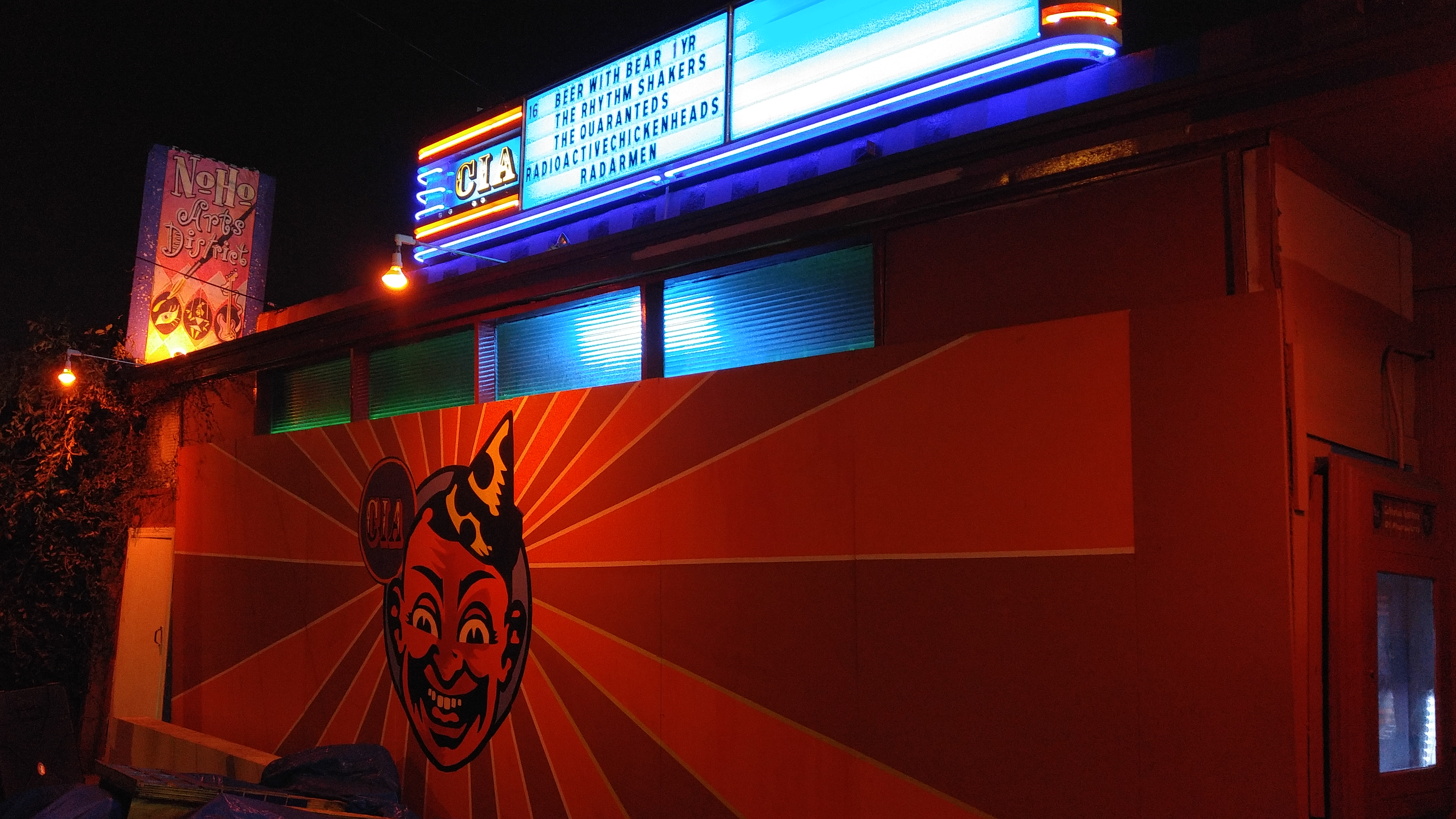
- Interactive map of California Institute of Abnormalarts
- Location: 11334 Burbank Boulevard, North Hollywood, California 91601
- Coordinates: 34.17198°N 118.37742°W
- Owner: Carl Crew and Robert Ferguson
- Type: Nightclub, museum

Construction
- Opened: 2001
- Closed: 2022

The California Institute of Abnormalarts - also written as the California Institute of Abnormal Arts and abbreviated as CIA - was a nightclub and sideshow museum located in North Hollywood, California. Owned and operated by actor-screenwriter Carl Crew and Robert Ferguson, the venue primarily hosted underground musical groups, performance art, movie screenings and sideshow acts including burlesque and freak shows. The club closed in July 2022.

== Overview ==
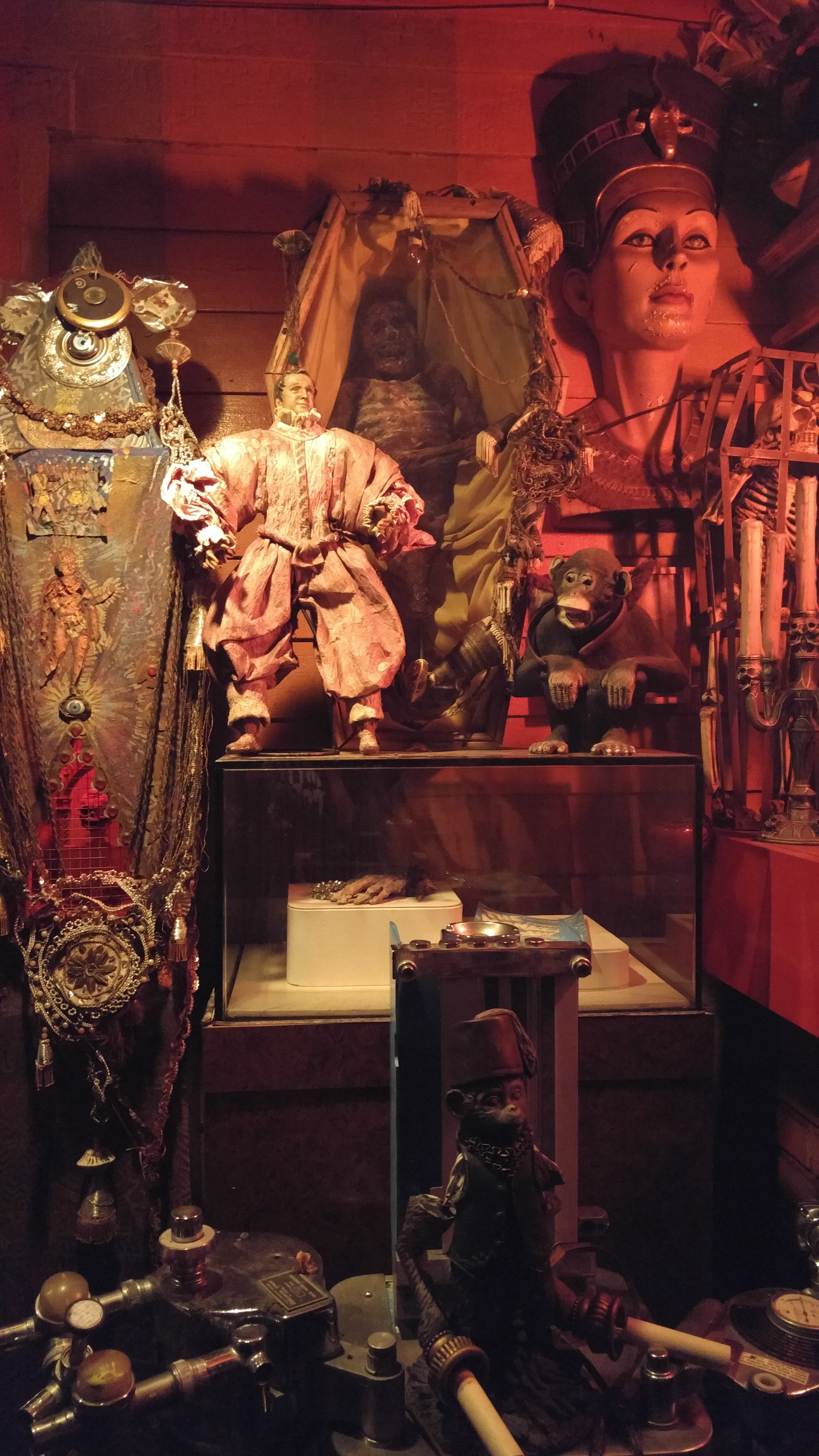
Some of the sideshow displays at the CIA, here featuring a Fiji mermaid and a monkey's paw.

Owners Carl Crew and Robert Ferguson befriended each other while they were both working as apprentice embalmers in a Los Angeles mortuary in the 1980s. In 1994, the two opened the CIA as a clandestine location for underground bands and performance art, obtaining a dilapidated building in the North Hollywood district which once served as a recording studio during the 1970s. In the late 1990s, the CIA was raided by police and ultimately shut down for serving liquor without a license; the venue remained out of operation for three years until Crew and Ferguson re-opened it in 2001 with its current sideshow-themed aesthetic.

The CIA featured an extensive collection of sideshow memorabilia that Crew and Ferguson, both avid fans and historians of the American sideshow, had collected over the years. The venue, painted with bright, garish circus colors, displayed cryptotaxidermy, pickled punks and vintage banners for sideshow attractions and over the years has featured such oddities and hoaxes as a Fiji mermaid, the skull of "the world's smallest Freemason", the severed head of Sasquatch, the severed arm of Claude de Lorraine and a fairy skeleton. The CIA's most notable attraction, however, may have been the preserved corpse of Achile Chatouilleu, an American circus performer who died in 1912 and requested his body be put on display in the clown makeup and attire he had worn throughout his life. Although Crew leased the body for six months in 2002, he claims that the owners "forgot" to retrieve it and the corpse remained at the CIA in a hermetically sealed glass coffin, the body itself embalmed with arsenic. Chatouilleu's corpse was such a prominent fixture of the CIA that the LA Weekly newspaper ranked the venue in its "Best of LA 2006" list as "Best Place to Find a Dead Clown".

As a music and performance venue, the CIA showcased intentionally offbeat and bizarre musical groups, as well as freak shows, performance art, puppet shows, burlesque acts, stand-up comedy, movie screenings and other sorts of unusual performances. Every month, the CIA hosted Club Microwave, which showcased chiptune and electronic music and DJs and has featured such artists as 8 Bit Weapon, ComputeHer and Trash80, among others. The CIA also regularly hosted an event called Shades and Shadows, a live reading series focusing exclusively on dark fantasy, horror and science fiction literature. Among the authors who have appeared with Shades and Shadows include Martin Pousson, Ben Loory, Lisa Morton and Steven-Elliot Altman.

The CIA has been featured on the dating shows Blind Date and EX-treme Dating, and in 2013, Crew and regular CIA performer Count Smokula showcased the venue on an episode of the Discovery Channel series Oddities. In 2014 and 2015, the CIA appeared on Halloween-themed episodes of the local interest shows 1st Look (KNBC) and Eye on LA (KABC-TV), respectively, both of which featured interviews with Crew and footage of the comedy punk band The Radioactive Chicken Heads performing on the venue's stage.

In July 2022, the club's owners announced that they were closing the venue partly due to financial struggles related to the COVID-19 pandemic. Crew explained that "People have no idea what it's like to own a club. People think you're rich, but most of those years were a struggle. We tried everything to stay open". The club sold many of its decorations, although an anonymous buyer purchased many of the more outlandish items before the sale, including the corpse of Chatouilleu.

== Notable performers at CIA ==
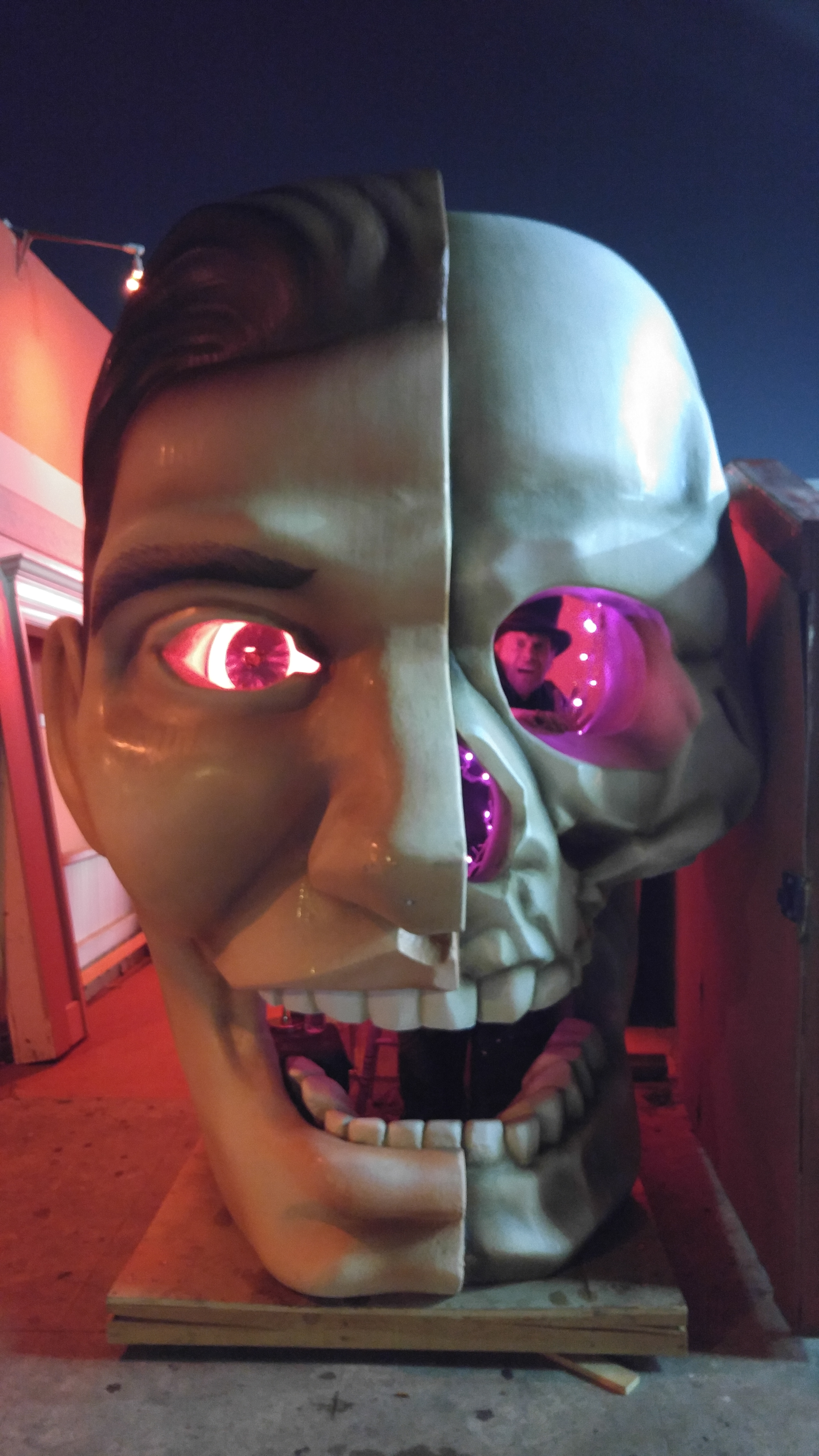
The CIA box office, with owner Carl Crew pictured within its eye socket.

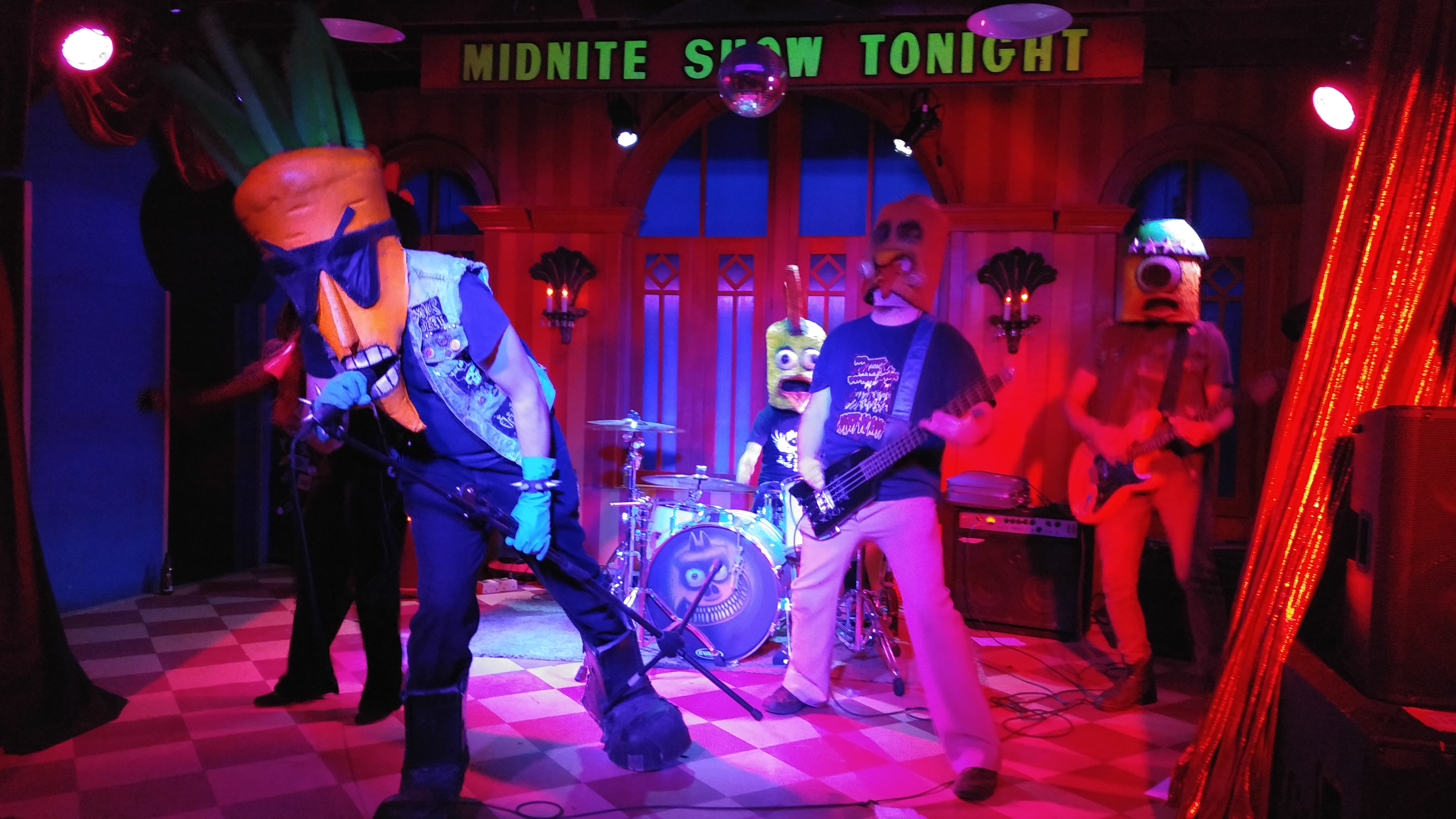
The CIA's performance stage, here occupied by The Radioactive Chicken Heads.

The following is an incomplete list of some of the more notable bands, musicians, performers and artists who have appeared at the CIA:

- 8 Bit Weapon
- Art of Bleeding
- Bastard Noise/Amps for Christ
- ComputeHer
- Count Smokula
- Dame Darcy
- Dead Kansas

Independent zombie web-series filmed at C.I.A in 2012. Actors Irwin Keyes and Ben Woolf were in the scene.

- DEATH CAT
- The Dickies
- Doctor Steel
- Duncan Trussell
- The Enigma
- Gatto di Morte
- George McArthur|George the Giant
- Ghastly Ones
- Glen Meadmore
- Green Jellÿ
- Haunted Garage

Horror punk band hosted their first reunion show in five years at the CIA in October 2013. Singer Dukey Flyswatter wrote the screenplay for 1987's Blood Diner, starring CIA co-owner Carl Crew.

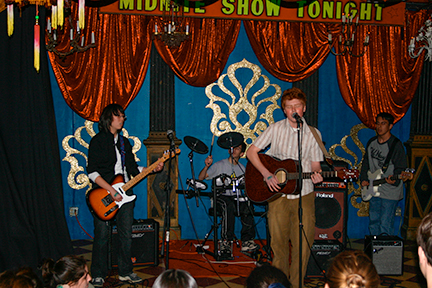
Rock band Zen Marlin on stage at the CIA in January, 2004.

- Integra Pink (formerly The Boulevards-Riverside, Ca)
- Jack Dagger
- Josh Robert Thompson
- Katja Glieson
- Lake Dads
- Matt Scott of the Bob Baker Marionette Theater
- The Megas
- NK Riot
- The Protomen
- The Radioactive Chicken Heads Comedy punk band who have been regular performers at CIA since 2002. The band's 2012 music video "Headless Mike" was partially shot at the CIA.
- Russ Tolman
- Remember Paul Martin
- Shaye Saint John
- Slymenstra Hymen and the Girly Freak Show
- Stolen Babies
- Trash80
- The Boulevards-Riverside, Ca- Now known as Integra Pink
- Zamora the Torture King
- Zen Marlin
