= Chris J. Miller =

American actor

Chris J. Miller is an American director, writer, composer and actor.

== History ==
Born in Russleville, Kentucky in 1983, Chris J. Miller started his career as a child actor appearing in a string of popular commercials, including; Doctor Dreadful, Mighty Max (toyline), McDonald's, Hot Wheels, Nickelodeon toys and Eggo Waffles. Miller then started acting in various television series, such as SeaQuest DSV, Maybe This Time and Evening Shade. His first theatrical acting role was in Star Trek Generations as Rene Picard, the nephew of Jean-Luc Picard. He also did motion capture acting for the 1995 film Casper.

Miller was given a super 8 film camera by his parents when he was nine and started experimenting with claymation. With the advent of video in his teenage years, Miller started making hundreds of experimental shorts.

With a growing interest in makeup and special effects, Miller began working with Emmy Award winning makeup artist Dean C. Jones at American Makeup and FX on such films as Roman and Night of the Living Dead 3D. Miller also contributed special makeup effects for the TV shows Over There and Dexter.

In 2006, Miller started Razorwire Pictures, a film production company specializing in horror films and animation. Miller has since written, directed and provided the musical scores for numerous features and short films. Miller started doing extensive stop-motion animation work for the 2008 children's variety show Polyphony, which was an official selection at the Coachella Valley Music and Arts Festival. His other animated shorts can be found on the Bizarre Cartoons and Avant-garde animation DVD compilations.

In 2009, Miller released The Mondo Splatter Collection, a DVD containing his first three feature films, Marblehead, October Nightmare and Carrion.

In 2009, Miller directed the horror-musical Ironhorse, starring Eric Lutes, adult film star Brittany O'Neil, and Carl Crew (Blood Diner). Horror website Cinemaglob praised the film, comparing it to Eraserhead and Forbidden Zone due to its grainy black and white visuals, and surrealistic elements. Most of the music from the soundtrack was released on CD by Miller under the pseudonym Krzysztof Muller.

In 2010, Miller received two Pixie awards from the American Pixel Academy for his work in stop motion animation.

In 2011, he received two Empixx awards in the animation category for his short films The Lightbulb Factory and Crawfish. Also in 2011, Miller directed various interview specials and promos for Hart D. Fisher's American Horrors channel on FilmOn.

Miller also did some editing work and designed the stop motion title sequence for the feature film Toolbox Murders 2 AKA Coffin Baby. That same year he also co-wrote the screenplays to the Christian dramas, Lukewarm, which stars John Schneider, Bill Cobbs and Jenna von Oÿ, and Online which were distributed by Image Entertainment. Both movies received positive reviews from the Dove Foundation.

In 2012, Miller completed The Second Self, starring Kyle Morris (2012: Ice Age) completing a short film trilogy based on his dreams that began with Crawfish and Tioga. The three shorts appear together on the DVD compilation The Second Self ...and Other Stories.

Critics have compared Chris J. Miller's films to the early works of such directors as David Lynch, Terry Gilliam, David Cronenberg, Jan Švankmajer, Ed Wood and John Waters.

In 2013 Miller completed the post-apocalyptic feature 2035: Forbidden Dimensions which was an official selection at the New Orleans Horror film festival. In 2014, ITN Entertainment picked up 2035: Forbidden Dimensions for worldwide distribution and a special screening was held at San Diego Comic-Con. Critical reviews from horror websites Dread Central and Horror News praised the film's 80's VHS style homages, practical makeup effects and psychedelic overtones.

Miller also worked on various projects for independent movie company The Asylum as an art director for the films The Coed and the Zombie Stoner and the Christmas special Santa Claws. He also did special makeup effects for Sharknado 3.

In 2016 Miller finished Mortuary Massacre, an exploitation horror anthology which was picked up for worldwide distribution by Wild Eye Releasing. Mortuary Massacre was an official selection at Fester: The Mindfuck Film Festival and premiered at the California Institute of Abnormalarts. In 2017 Miller started directing a political docudrama/road movie called Utopia Means Nowhere which is set to be released simultaneously with the publication of his artbook Chemobrain: The Art of Chris J. Miller during the November election of 2020.

Since 2019 Miller has been directing Music Videos for a variety of bands, while working on numerous projects with Ren and Stimpy creator John Kricfalusi.

=== Personal life ===
According to his official Facebook page, Miller was very sick while working on Mortuary Massacre, and in July 2016 while finalizing the edits, he was diagnosed with stage 3 Hodgkin's Lymphoma. After sending out the final cut of the film to his distributors, he immediately underwent chemotherapy. In April 2017 his cancer was in full remission. Miller is an avid collector of cult film memorabilia and provided rare deleted scenes and other bonus features for the 2016 Blu-ray release of Claudio Fragasso's Monster Dog. Miller married animator and mortician Erin "Lydia" Blaisdell on Halloween night in 2006, at a funeral home in Culver City, California. They separated in 2016 and became divorced in 2017.

Miller has been in a domestic partnership with model/artist Julie Sjolund since February 2020.

=== Selected filmography ===
| Year | Feature Films | Credit |
|---|---|---|
| 1994 | Star Trek Generations | Actor |
| 2006 | Marblehead | Director, writer, composer, animator, editor (director's cut) |
| 2007 | Carrion | Director, writer, composer, editor |
| 2008 | Polyphony | Director, writer, composer, animator, editor |
| 2008 | October Nightmare | Director, writer, composer, animator, editor |
| 2010 | Ironhorse | Director, writer, composer, animator, editor |
| 2011 | Voyeur Killer | Producer |
| 2012 | Lukewarm | Writer |
| 2013 | Online | Writer, co-producer |
| 2013 | Toolbox Murders 2 (aka Coffin Baby) | Editor, stop-motion animator, co-producer (international version) |
| 2013 | 2035: Forbidden Dimensions | Director, writer, composer, editor |
| 2015 | Sharknado 3 | Special make-up effects |
| 2016 | Mortuary Massacre | Director, writer, composer, editor |
| 2017 | Utopia Means Nowhere | Director, writer, composer, editor (In production) |

| Year | Short Films | Available |
|---|---|---|
| 1998 | Why Not? | Bizarre Cartoons |
| 2006 | Human Expermientz | Bizarre Cartoons |
| 2007 | Chicago Dracula | Bizarre Cartoons |
| 2009 | Sushi | Bizarre Cartoons |
| 2009 | Sushi 2 | Bizarre Cartoons |
| 2010 | The Lightbulb Factory | Avant-Garde Animation |
| 2010 | Crawfish | The Second Self ...and Other Stories |
| 2011 | Eskimo | Avant-Garde Animation |
| 2011 | Pork 'n' Beans | Avant-Garde Animation |
| 2011 | Sushi 3 | Avant-Garde Animation |
| 2011 | Workday | Avant-Garde Animation |
| 2011 | Tioga | The Second Self ...and Other Stories |
| 2012 | The Second Self | The Second Self ...and Other Stories |
