= The Being =

- Theatrical release poster
- Directed by: Jackie Kong
- Written by: Jackie Kong
- Produced by: Bill Osco
- Starring: Martin Landau; José Ferrer; Dorothy Malone; Ruth Buzzi; Marianne Gordon; Bill Osco
- Cinematography: Hanania Baer; Robert Ebinger
- Edited by: David H. Newhouse
- Music by: Don Preston
- Production company: Cybelle Productions
- Distributed by: Best Film & Video Corp. New World Pictures; Aquarius Films; Crest Films
- Release date: May 8, 1981 (Tucson, Arizona)
- Running time: 82 minutes
- Country: United States
- Language: English
- Budget: $4.5 million

The Being is a 1981 American horror film written and directed by Jackie Kong in her directorial debut, starring Martin Landau, José Ferrer, Dorothy Malone, comedian Ruth Buzzi, Marianne Gordon, and exploitation film producer Bill Osco, who is billed as "Rexx Coltrane" in the opening credits and "Johnny Commander" in the closing credits. It focuses on a detective who is trying to solve a string of grisly murders and disappearances in a small Idaho town.

Kong, a recent college graduate, was given a $4.5 million budget from her then-husband Bill Osco to write and direct a film. Principal photography began in 1980 in Idaho under the title Easter Sunday.

The Being had its world premiere in Tucson, Arizona, on May 8, 1981, under the alternate title Beauty and the Beast. It was later distributed under the title The Being in November 1983 through the distributor Best Film and Video Corporation.

== Plot ==
In the town of Pottsville, Idaho, citizens begin disappearing. Young Michael Smith, son of Marge Smith (Dorothy Malone), is the first to vanish. A young man is decapitated while fleeing from an unseen assailant, and three patrons at a drive-in theater are brutally murdered. At each scene, green slime is found. Wanting to get to the bottom of the disappearances but afraid that the publicity might damage the town's potato business, Mayor Gordon Lane (José Ferrer) hires chemical safety engineer Garcon Jones (Martin Landau) to investigate. Also investigating the disappearances is Detective Mortimer Lutz (Bill Osco), who suspects that something terrible has befallen the town.

Meanwhile, more people disappear, and a puddle of green slime is found at each site. With this new string of disappearances, Lutz suspects that Jones knows more than he will admit. His suspicions grow when he is attacked by something monstrous at home, and he barely manages to escape. Lutz confronts Jones about the incident but is told there is nothing wrong in the area.

The following night, while Lutz takes his waitress girlfriend Laurie (Marianne Gordon) home, they are attacked by a hideous creature. After holing themselves inside a diner, they lock it inside a freezer. The couple then contact Mayor Lane; however, when he arrives, they discover that the creature has vanished, leaving behind a puddle of green slime. In light of this recent attack, Lutz confronts Jones again, who then admits that a highly radioactive creature is responsible. It is revealed that the town is home to one of 2,000 nuclear dump sites in the U.S., and the creature (which is implied to be Michael Smith) is the resulting mutation due to repeated exposure to the site's radioactive materials. The mutant, while intelligent, is completely psychotic but sensitive to light and is inactive during the day.

Arming themselves with shotguns, Jones and Lutz eventually track the creature down to an abandoned warehouse, where the hungry mutant stalks them. Jones is soon attacked and disemboweled by the creature, leaving Lutz alone to fend off the creature. Donning a gas mask, Lutz attempts to kill the creature with poison gas, but it seems unfazed by the poisonous fumes and tosses Lutz around like a ragdoll. As the creature advances, Lutz manages to toss a beaker of acid into the creature's face, momentarily stunning it. Taking advantage of the creature's distraction, Lutz grabs a nearby axe and hacks the creature to death, ending the reign of terror.

A new mutation is seen bursting from the ground.

== Cast ==
- Martin Landau as Garson Jones
- Marianne Gordon as Laurie
- Bill Osco as Detective Mortimer Lutz
- José Ferrer as Mayor Gordon Lane
- Dorothy Malone as Marge Smith
- Ruth Buzzi as Virginia Lane

Cast notes:

- Marianne Gordon was married to singer Kenny Rogers at the time, and is billed as "Marianne Gordon Rogers"
- Robin Stille is featured in the drive-in movie.

== Production ==
Kong, a recent college graduate, was given a $4.5 million budget from then-husband Bill Osco to write and direct a film, despite the fact that she had no professional film-making experience. She stated that she impressed Osco with storyboards and shot breakdowns. Kong wooed Martin Landau by pretending to be an actor interested in his theater workshop, and using the opportunity to give him her script. Impressed with her straightforwardness, he accepted the role. It would mark producer and occasional actor Osco's departure from his previous sexually explicit films such as the 1974 sexploitation film Flesh Gordon.

=== Filming ===
Principal photography was originally intended to occur in eastern Oregon, but instead began in 1980 in Boise, Idaho. The film was shot under the working title Easter Sunday. Some additional post-production filming took place in Utah and Los Angeles.

== Release ==
=== Theatrical release ===
During the film's production it was intended that the film would be released on Easter in 1981. The film had a premiere in Tucson, Arizona on May 8, 1981, under the alternate title Beauty and the Beast. Stars Martin Landau, Dorothy Malone, and Ruth Buzzi made local appearances to promote the film. A premiere party was held at the Arizona Inn in Tucson.

The film was later released as The Being on November 18, 1983, under its new title.

=== Home media ===
The Being was released on DVD on September 13, 2005, by Shriek Studio in widescreen format with no special features. Shriek Studio released it again on July 31, 2007, as a part its Mutant Monsters Triple Feature which combined it with The Dark and Creatures from the Abyss. It was last released by Code Red as a double feature alongside Cop Killers.

== Reception ==
=== Box office ===
The Being was a commercial failure, performing poorly at the box office.

=== Critical response ===
Jacqi Tully of the Arizona Daily Star noted the film's vintage aesthetic, describing it as having a "'50s feel with an '80s message," but criticized the screenplay for setting forth "a potentially interesting premise only to let the real chills of the story to heat up to a tedious atmosphere."

Scott Weinberg from DVD Talk was among the film's detractors calling the film "Grungy, muddy-looking" he also called it a "blatant Alien ripoff". J. Read from Monstersatplay.com called it "cheap, rushed, and an incongruous mess" stating it as a perfect example of all the bad movies that came out in the 1980s. Allmovie called the film "abysmal", with "clumsy, ham-fisted" direction,"lack of focus", "goofy" effects, and a "leaden, noncharismatic" performance from lead actor and producer Bill Osco. Nevertheless, the reviewer calls it "worthy of note for cinematic trash-fiends", because of its cast, flashes of humor and "oddball qualities".

Robert Firsching from The New York Times panned the film, calling it, "abysmal". Leonard Maltin awarded the film 1 1/2 stars out of 4 stating that humor was the film's only saving grace, stating that "it wasn't enough to overcome its Z-grade script and production". Jack Sommersby from eFilmCritic.com gave the film a negative review, writing, "it's not the worst of its type but not quite good enough to warrant a recommendation". Brett Gallman from Oh, the Horror! wrote, "The Being manages an odd, offbeat quality despite its familiarity. It's a film that features an amorphous killer alien but also takes the time to consider Pottsville's other plights, such as the impending arrival of a massage parlor that has the moral majority in a tizzy. Osco's voiceover narration and interior monologues abruptly stop midway through the film, and even the Easter setting is entirely incidental".

== Legacy ==
In spite of the film's critical and commercial failure, The Being would gain a small cult following over the years since its release. Kong would go on to direct Night Patrol (1984) and the 1987 cult horror film Blood Diner.

== Bibliography ==
- Bowker (December 31, 1985). Variety's Film Reviews: 1983-1984. Bowker. ISBN 978-0-8352-2798-8.
- Maltin, Leonard (September 2, 2014). Leonard Maltin's 2015 Movie Guide. Penguin Publishing Group. ISBN 978-0-698-18361-2.
- Muir, John Kenneth (July 28, 2010). Horror Films of the 1980s. McFarland. ISBN 978-0-7864-5501-0.
- Stine, Scott Aaron (July 8, 2003). The Gorehound's Guide to Splatter Films of the 1980s. McFarland. ISBN 978-0-7864-1532-8.
- Weldon, Michael (1996). The Psychotronic Video Guide To Film. St. Martin's Press. ISBN 978-0-312-13149-4.
