= Jackie Kong =

American film director

- Born: June 14, 1957 (age 69); Hanford, California, U.S.
- Education: California State University Northridge
- Occupations: Film director; screenwriter; producer

Jackie Kong is an American screenwriter, film producer, and film director known for the cult horror film Blood Diner.

== Biography ==
Kong was born in Hanford, California, and grew up in Benedict Canyon above Beverly Hills. Kong has four sisters and one brother. She and her mother moved to Hollywood when Jackie was 16 so her mother, Anita Loo, could pursue a career as an actress. Her mother was a cinephile, and Kong was exposed at a young age to the world of film. In an interview on the podcast Shock Waves, Kong recalled receiving her first 16 mm film camera from her mother's good friend Marlon Brando for her 18th birthday. Marlon did however try to talk her out of the world of cinema because of the stigma and pressures of the Hollywood scene. Despite the reluctant support from Brando and her parents, Kong went on to become a director. Kong attended Beverly Hills High School, where she started making short films, and later graduated from California State University, Northridge.

Kong used to produce, writ and direct films that are often inventive, shocking, and funny. Throughout the 1980s, Kong made four low-budget films and began doing so in her early 20s. She made her first film at the age of 23. Her first film debut was with the killer toxic mutant monster horror feature The Being, starring José Ferrer, Ruth Buzzi, Dorothy Malone, and Martin Landau. Kong next made the film Night Patrol, starring Linda Blair, Murray "The Unknown Comic" Langston, and Pat Paulsen. Both The Being and Night Patrol were produced by Kong's husband at the time, Bill Osco. Her last film was the extremely gory Blood Diner, which was a tribute to the notorious Herschell Gordon Lewis horror film, Blood Feast.

Jackie Kong briefly resurfaced in 2001 when directing and producing episodes of the short-lived TV series Karaoke Nights. Her films such as Blood Diner have developed a "cult" following which contribute greatly to her maintaining relevance in film.

She was only able to complete two films of her three-picture deal due to Vestron (the video company) going out of business. More recently, she has worked as a speaker and guest of many film festivals and became the Executive Director of a non-profit organization called Asian American Media Development.

Jackie Kong began her foray in Horror Comics 2022, adding Comic Book Creator to her list of accomplishments. Kong delivered Issue #1 of Spend The Night to Kickstarter Backers who funded the first book in October 2021.

== Filmography ==
- The Being (1983)
- Night Patrol (1984)
- The Underachievers (1987)
- Blood Diner (1987)
- Karaoke Nights (2001) (TV series)
- In Search of Darkness: Part II (2020) (Documentary)
- "Creature Features" (2020 and 2021)
