= Stolen Youth =

Stolen Youth may refer to:

- Stolen Youth, a collaborative mixtape by American rapper Vince Staples and rapper/producer Mac Miller
- Stolen Youth: Inside the Cult at Sarah Lawrence, a 2023 American true crime documentary miniseries
- A Friend's Betrayal, a 1996 television drama film also released as Stolen Youth
