= Coffin Baby =

- Release Poster
- Directed by: Dean C. Jones
- Written by: Josh Edwards; Dean Jones
- Produced by: Starr Jones; Kristy Horiuchi; Robert Diaz Leroy
- Starring: Bruce Dern; Brian Krause; Clifton Powell; Chauntal Lewis
- Cinematography: David Bridges
- Edited by: Ryan Correll; Sherwood Jones; Chris J. Miller
- Music by: Michael Huey; Terry Huud
- Production companies: Atlantic & Pacific Pictures
- Distributed by: PFG Entertainment; New KSM
- Release date: July 9, 2013 (DVD release)
- Running time: 84 minutes
- Country: United States
- Language: English

Coffin Baby (also known as Toolbox Murders 2, TBK: The Toolbox Murders 2, and Coffin Baby - The Toolbox Killer Is Back) is a 2013 American slasher film written and directed by Dean C. Jones and starring Bruce Dern, Brian Krause, Clifton Powell, and Ethan Phillips. Initially, the film entered production intended as a sequel to 2004's Toolbox Murders, itself a remake of the 1978 horror cult classic. While a majority of the footage used in Coffin Baby was intended to be used in the planned sequel, behind-the-scenes trouble forced the production to retool the project. Actor Christopher Doyle reprises his role as Coffin Baby from the 2004 film. Distribution of Coffin Baby has been stopped by agreement between Dean Jones and the producers of Toolbox Murders 2.

== Plot ==
In Hollywood, Samantha Forester (Chauntal Lewis) is kidnapped by "Coffin Baby" (Christopher Doyle), branded, locked in a cage, and forced to witness dozens upon dozens of other Los Angeles citizens being murdered in various brutal ways. When she is reported as missing, But, later, by unknown reason, he cut off her left hand. After 10 days in captivity, Coffin Baby falls in love with Samantha and gives her an orchid. Becoming crazed by her confinement, she herself eats cooked human flesh from another blonde victim.

== Cast ==
- Bruce Dern as Vance Henrickson
- Brian Krause as Detective Chad Cole
- Clifton Powell as Detective S. Jackson
- Chauntal Lewis as Samantha Forester
- Christopher Doyle as Coffin Baby
- Ethan Phillips as Coroner B. Jones
- Ron Chaney as Detective L. Wehage
- Isabelle Freitheim as Sabrina Forester
- Allison Kyler as Amy Weinstein
- Whitney Anderson as Winter Jones
- Dean C. Jones as H. Bogart
- Mychal Thompson as Rodney W. Smith
- Douglas Tait as Coffin Baby Double

== Production ==
The film is the directorial debut of Dean Jones, a makeup artist perhaps best known as an eight-time nominee for the Emmy for Outstanding Makeup for his work on Star Trek: Deep Space Nine. In October 2012, filmmakers and brothers Dean Jones and Starr Jones shot Coffin Baby in Alamance County, North Carolina, on locations in their hometown of Graham, North Carolina. Area emergency workers and residents served as extras.

== Release ==
The film was initially released in April 2013 by Atlantic & Film Pictures before releasing on DVD on July 9, 2013.

It was screened on September 30 and October 1, 2016 during the second annual Wreak Havoc Horror Film Festival in Greensboro, North Carolina.

== Reception ==
Nav Qateel of Influx Magazine felt that the film had potential to be an interesting horror film but failed due to an obviously troubled production. Paul Cardullo of Gruesome Magazine credited Dean Jones, along with effects supervisor William Jones and makeup artist Cary Ayers, for the film's good-looking gore and practical effects, but derided the movie for having no sensible plot or effective characters.
