= Pat Paulsen's Half a Comedy Hour =

- Genre: Comedy
- Directed by: Mark Goode
- Starring: Pat Paulsen; Billy Sands
- Country of origin: United States
- Original language: English
- No. of seasons: 1
- No. of episodes: 13

Production
- Executive producers: Ken Kragen; Neil Rosen
- Producers: Bill Carruthers; Mark Goode
- Editors: Richard F. Wilson; Emil Zvarich
- Running time: 30 min
- Production companies: Carruthers Company; Picky Video; ABC

Original release
- Network: ABC
- Release: January 22 – April 16, 1970

Pat Paulsen's Half a Comedy Hour is an American half-hour television variety show that ran on ABC-TV on Thursday nights at 7:30 p.m. from January 22, 1970, to April 16, 1970.

The star was Pat Paulsen, who ran for the office of President of the United States in 1968. Paulsen had been a regular on The Smothers Brothers Comedy Hour. Jean Byron was a semi-regular. Writers included Steve Martin.

Paulsen often spoofed Then Came Bronson and played a science teacher. Guest stars included Hubert Humphrey, Angie Dickinson, Tiny Tim, Miss Vickie, Mike Connors, Dan Blocker, Henry Fonda, Tommy Smothers, Don Rickles, Don Adams, Carl Betz, the animated Daffy Duck and Foghorn Leghorn and Joey Heatherton. On the April 9, 1970, episode, Paulsen sang the song "Did I Ever Really Live?", which was from his Mercury record album, Live at the Ice House.

The show was cancelled after 13 episodes.

MPI released the entire series on DVD in 2009.

The series is available on Amazon Prime Video and Tubi.
