= The Secret Life: Jeffrey Dahmer =

1993 film by David R. Bowen

Jeffrey Dahmer: The Secret Life
- Directed by: David R. Bowen
- Screenplay by: Carl Crew
- Starring: Carl Crew; Donna Stewart Bowen; Jeanne Bascom
- Cinematography: Ronald Vidor
- Music by: David R. Bowen
- Production company: Moonlith Films
- Release date: 1993
- Running time: 99 minutes
- Country: United States
- Language: English

The Secret Life: Jeffrey Dahmer is a 1993 American low budget biographical crime drama film directed by David R. Bowen. It stars Carl Crew as Jeffrey Dahmer, an American serial killer, necrophile, and cannibal.

The film is a firsthand account of Dahmer's lifestyle as a serial killer. When he was finally caught, it was revealed that his apartment was a chamber of horrors, where, according to the film, he tortured his young victims to death. Then he sliced up the bodies and stored the parts in his freezer, among other places. The Secret Life: Jeffrey Dahmer was produced one year before Dahmer was murdered in prison.

== Production ==
The film was shot from May through July 1992.

== See also ==
- Dahmer – A 2002 biographical true crime horror film (starring Jeremy Renner as Dahmer).
- My Friend Dahmer – A 2017 biographical drama film (starring Ross Lynch as Dahmer).
- The Jeffrey Dahmer Files – A 2012 independent documentary film.
- Dahmer – Monster: The Jeffrey Dahmer Story – A 10-part biographical crime drama series that was commissioned by Netflix and released on September 21, 2022 (starring Evan Peters as Dahmer).
