= Chauntal Lewis =

American stage and film actress

- Born: Oxnard, California
- Years active: 1995–present

Chauntal Lewis is an American stage and film actress. She started her acting career at the age of five. Since 1995, she has appeared in more than 20 movies and TV series.

== Biography ==
Lewis was born and grew up in Oxnard, California. Her stage career began, when she was five. Her first film role was as Susan's Best Friend Roxanne Strybos in Apollo 13. On March 18, 2009, Lewis was in a car accident and lost her left hand above the wrist. She has continued with her acting career.

== Filmography ==
=== Film ===
Year	Title	Role	Notes
1995	Apollo 13	Roxanne Strybos (Susan's Friend)	Uncredited
1998	The Wedding Singer	Stuck-Up Girl at Bar Mitzvah	Uncredited
2005	Coach Carter	St. Francis Cheerleader	
2006	Beerfest	Girl Sprayed by Keg	Uncredited
2006	Séance	Alison	
2007	The Comebacks	Freddy's Girl	Uncredited
2009	The Commune	Jenny / Daughter	
2010	Hypo	Dr. Kaliel	
2013	Coffin Baby	Samantha Forester	
2015	Welcome to Happiness	Farrah	
2020	Magic Camp	Bridesmaid	

=== Television ===
Year	Title	Role	Notes
1995	Guideposts Junction	Friend #8	Episode: "All for One"
1996	A Friend's Betrayal	Young Abby	Television film
2015	Hot Girl Walks by	The Hot Girl	Episode: "Wannabes in a Parking Lot"
2015–present	General Hospital	Nurse Tara / Nurse Chanel	27 episodes

=== Video games ===
Year	Title	Role	Notes
2011	L.A. Noire	Female Pedestrian 18 / Lola	
