= Little Darlings =

1980 teen comedy-drama film by Ronald F. Maxwell

- Theatrical release poster
- Directed by: Ronald F. Maxwell
- Screenplay by: Kimi Peck; Dalene Young
- Story by: Kimi Peck
- Produced by: Stephen J. Friedman
- Starring: Tatum O'Neal; Kristy McNichol; Armand Assante; Matt Dillon; Maggie Blye; Nicolas Coster; Marianne Gordon
- Cinematography: Beda Batka
- Edited by: Pembroke J. Herring
- Music by: Charles Fox
- Production company: Kings Road Productions
- Distributed by: Paramount Pictures
- Release date: March 21, 1980 (US)
- Running time: 94 minutes
- Country: United States
- Language: English
- Budget: $5.3 million
- Box office: $34.3 million

Little Darlings is a 1980 American teen comedy-drama film starring Tatum O'Neal and Kristy McNichol and featuring Armand Assante and Matt Dillon. It was directed by Ronald F. Maxwell. The screenplay was written by Kimi Peck and Dalene Young and the original music score was composed by Charles Fox. The film was marketed with the tagline "Don't let the title fool you", a reference to a scene in which the character of Angel tells Randy, "Don't let the name fool you."

Film critic Roger Ebert said of the film that it "somehow does succeed in treating the awesome and scary subject of sexual initiation with some of the dignity it deserves."

== Plot ==
The opening scene is 1980. A group of teenage girls head to Camp Little Wolf, an all-girls camp for the summer. The group includes Angel Bright, a poor, cynical, streetwise girl, and Ferris Whitney, a romantic, naive rich girl. The two immediately develop a dislike for one another on the bus to camp and to their dismay learn they must share a cabin. Cinder Carlson, an arrogant teen model who is in the same cabin and is boastful about her sexual experiences, reveals to the group that Ferris and Angel are virgins, leading to the two girls making a bet to see which one of them can lose her virginity first. All of the girls in the camp divide into two "teams", each rooting for and egging on either Ferris or Angel.

One day, the girls manage to steal one of the camp buses and use it to get condoms from the men's room at the local gas station. On the outing, Angel meets Randy, a boy from the camp across the lake. She is attracted to him and decides Randy is the guy she wants to lose her virginity to. Meanwhile, Ferris sets her sights on Gary Callahan, a much older camp counselor. Angel regularly sneaks out of camp to see Randy and she tries to get him drunk, while Ferris attempts to seduce Gary, but neither girl is successful in her efforts. During Parents' Day, Ferris' dad reveals that he is divorcing her mom, which leads to Ferris feeling disillusioned in her ideas of romantic love. Angel feels distressed when her mother suggests that sex is "no big deal”.

One night, Ferris finally tries to tell Gary how she feels. She goes to his cabin and talks about Romeo and Juliet, but Gary calmly rebuffs her, telling her he is "a teacher", not "a prince". Pressured by the other girls, she lies and says that she and Gary had sex. The rumors spread throughout the camp, jeopardizing Gary's job.

Angel tries to view the act of sex with the same nonchalance as her mother, but when she has an opportunity to have sex with Randy in a boathouse, she becomes confused and hesitant. Randy is put off by Angel's reluctance and leaves, with Angel tearfully protesting, "But I like you!" A few days later, she meets Randy again with a changed attitude, and they manage to consummate their relationship. However, the experience is not what Angel thought it would be like, and she does not tell the other girls that she had sex. She allows Ferris to win the bet.

The girls in the camp eventually all turn against Cinder and call her out for instigating the bet, with some of the girls arguing that it doesn't matter who is a virgin or not. Ferris also apologizes to Gary and confesses to the camp director about her lie, saving Gary's job. When Randy later seeks Angel out, she admits that while she likes him, she is not ready for a relationship with him. Angel and Ferris leave camp realizing they are more alike than different, and as they return home to their parents, they become best friends.

== Cast ==
- Tatum O'Neal as Ferris Whitney
- Kristy McNichol as Angel Bright
- Armand Assante as Gary Callahan
- Matt Dillon as Randy Adams
- Maggie Blye as Ms. Bright
- Nicolas Coster as Mr. Whitney
- Marianne Gordon as Mrs. Whitney
- Krista Errickson as Cinder Carlson
- Alexa Kenin as Dana
- Mary Betten as Miss Nichols
- Abby Bluestone as Chubby
- Troas Hayes as Diane
- Cynthia Nixon as Sunshine Walker
- Simone Schachter as Carrots
- Jenn Thompson as Penelope Schubert

== Production ==
The film was made by Stephen Friedman's Kings Road Productions. Paramount agreed to provide $5.3 million to make it in exchange for $14.3 million to market and develop the film.

Kristy McNichol had the first pick of lead roles over Tatum O’Neal and chose the role of Angel, the more streetwise character.

Principal photography on Little Darlings began on March 19, 1979, at Hard Labor Creek State Park, 50 miles east of Atlanta. The gas station men's room (condom) scene was filmed in downtown Rutledge, the town nearest the park. The meeting place for the buses at the beginning and ending were filmed in a parking lot near the offices of The Atlanta Journal-Constitution, and the old Omni Coliseum can be seen in the background including in the last scene of the movie. When Ferris is driven into town, they pass the Swan House, indicating that her family lives in Buckhead, a wealthy part of town to the north of the city.

A novelization of the film by Sonia Pilcer was released as a tie-in in 1980.

== Reception ==
The film made $34.3 million domestically against a budget of $5.3 million. The film also made $1.2 million in the ancillary markets.

On Rotten Tomatoes, the film holds a "fresh" approval rating of 67% based on nine reviews. On Metacritic, the film holds a score of 45 out of 100 based on nine reviews, indicating "mixed or average reviews".

Frank Rich of Time praised McNichol's acting, but criticized the script and said the characters were underdeveloped. Janet Maslin of The New York Times wrote, “Miss O'Neal and Miss McNichol, both lovely and accomplished actresses, are much better than their material. And they go a long way toward lending the story a little charm.” Roger Ebert of the Chicago Sun-Times also criticized the tonal inconsistencies of the film, but noted that “the scenes in which [the characters] actually confront the realities of sex are handled so thoughtfully and tastefully that they almost seem to belong to another movie.”

== Home video ==
The film was notable for having a contemporary pop soundtrack, with music by artists like Blondie, Rickie Lee Jones, Supertramp, The Cars, and Iain Matthews. The original video releases—on blue box VHS and laserdisc—kept the soundtrack intact; however, many songs in the film such as Supertramp's "School", John Lennon's "Oh My Love" and The Bellamy Brothers' "Let Your Love Flow" were removed from the second round of home releases—VHS red box—due to licensing issues, and were replaced with sound-alikes.

These licensing complications would lead to the film being unavailable on home video for many years; a planned 2012 DVD release by Lionsgate, home video distributors for Paramount catalog titles at that time, was ultimately canceled. The film, with its original theatrical soundtrack, would finally be released on both Blu-ray and 4K UHD formats in January 2024 by Vinegar Syndrome sub-label Cinématographe.

== TV version ==
NBC acquired the film's broadcasting rights for $2.7 million, and it was first aired on May 9, 1983, in a heavily edited version, removing all scenes and lines alluding to sexual activity, giving the impression that, instead of trying to lose their virginity, Angel and Ferris were engaged in competition simply to make a guy fall in love with them. As was common practice for TV-edited versions of Hollywood films at the time, the deleted scenes were replaced with alternate footage not used in the theatrical version, including a scene in which Angel rescues Ferris from drowning in the lake during a thunderstorm. Some additional music was also used in this version. The director disavowed this version of the film, though the alternate scenes were included on the film's Blu-ray release as a bonus.

== Awards and honors ==
- Young Artist Awards

Nominee: Second Best Young Actress in a Major Motion Picture - Kristy McNichol
