= Michael Trikilis =

American film and television producer (1940–2019)

- Born: July 14, 1940; Youngstown, Ohio, United States
- Died: December 28, 2019 (aged 79); Los Angeles, California
- Occupation: Producer
- Years active: 1973-2019
- Known for: Playboy Video
- Spouses: Marianne Gordon (m. 1971; div. 1975) Melissa Hunt (m. 1988)

Michael Trikilis (July 14, 1940 – December 28, 2019) was an American film and television producer, known mostly for his involvement with Playboy TV. In 1981, Trikilis, along with Hugh Hefner, developed much of the original programming for "The Playboy Channel". Most notably, Trikilis developed the signature "Playboy style" of video, which features women, Playboy Playmates and Celebrity Centerfolds, often in dreamlike versions of their everyday lives. He appeared as himself on E!'s reality show The Girls Next Door.

Trikilis also produced several feature films, including Six Pack (1982) and The Death of Ocean View Park (1979).

== Personal life ==
Trikilis's first wife was actress Marianne Gordon.

Trikilis was buried at Pierce Brothers Westwood Village Memorial Park and Mortuary in Los Angeles, California.
