= Six Pack (film) =

1982 film by Daniel Petrie

- Theatrical release poster
- Directed by: Daniel Petrie
- Written by: Mike Marvin; Alex Matter
- Produced by: Michael Trikilis
- Starring: Kenny Rogers; Diane Lane; Erin Gray
- Cinematography: Mario Tosi
- Edited by: Rita Roland
- Music by: Charles Fox
- Distributed by: 20th Century Fox
- Release date: July 16, 1982
- Running time: 108 minutes
- Country: United States
- Language: English
- Budget: $11.5–13.5 million
- Box office: $20,225,989

Six Pack is a 1982 American comedy-drama film directed by Daniel Petrie and starring Kenny Rogers, Diane Lane, Erin Gray, Anthony Michael Hall and Barry Corbin.

== Plot ==
When race car driver Brewster Baker stops at a gas station in a small Texas town, parts are stolen from his race car. While at a local diner, he sees people stealing parts from another car, so he gives chase.

When the thieves' van goes into a river, Brewster rescues them and discovers that they are orphaned children. The kids were stealing for "Big John", the corrupt county sheriff, who jails Brewster for breaking and entering, larceny, resisting arrest and speeding.

After the kids help break Brewster out of jail, Brewster reluctantly takes the children with him. They prevent the sheriff from giving chase by loosening several bolts on his car, like those on the doors and hood and the lug nuts.

Arriving in Shreveport, Louisiana, while Brewster is in a bar reacquainting himself with Lilah, the kids steal parts off other cars to reequip his car. He is able to come in fourth in the Dixie 100, but uses most of his winnings to pay back the drivers whose car parts the kids took.

At the next track in Mississippi, Breezy distracts rival driver Terk while her brothers tinker with his car. A few races later, Terk tries to get revenge on Brewster and the kids by calling the police on them. As they have formed a friendship and bonded, Brewster breaks them out by impersonating a police officer.

Finally sponsored by Ford, Brewster gets a new car for the Atlanta 500. Lilah surprises him there. Terk and some men jump him, dumping him in the woods. He comes to, hitches a ride, and makes it to the track in time to race. During a pit stop, Brewster discovers that the Texas sheriff has taken the kids. He leaves his pit box and cuts off Terk, who wrecks into the wall and chases down the Texas sheriff as he tries to take the kids away, cutting him off in the pits. Using the sudden media presence, he manages to get the kids away from the sheriff and gets the sheriff to admit that the kids are in good hands. Brewster and Lilah marry, adopt the kids and move into a house.

The end of the movie features real race footage from the 1982 NASCAR Coca-Cola 500, held at Atlanta Motor Speedway and won that year by Darrell Waltrip.

== Cast ==
- Kenny Rogers as Brewster Baker
- Diane Lane as Heather "Breezy" Aikens
- Erin Gray as Lilah
- Barry Corbin as Sheriff John "Big John", Corrupt County Sheriff
- Terry Kiser as Terk Logan
- Bob Hannah as Deputy Sheriff Otis Diddler, Corrupt County Deputy Sheriff
- Tom Abernathy as Louis
- Robbie Fleming as Harry "Little Harry"
- Anthony Michael Hall as "Doc"
- Robby Still as "Swifty"
- Benji Wilhoite as Steven
- Buddy Baker as Himself
- Chuck Woolery as Race Narrator
- Melanie McMullan as Pit Girl

== Music ==
The theme song to the film is "Love Will Turn You Around", a song performed and co-written by Rogers that was a #1 country and adult contemporary hit. It peaked at #13 on the pop chart. Miles Goodman served as an orchestrator for the film's score.

== Box office ==
The film had a limited release on July 16, 1982, and went wide on July 23, 1982. It proved to be a moderate hit at the box office and grossed over $20 million during its theatrical run.

== Reception ==
Janet Maslin of The New York Times in her review, called Six Pack "good-natured but none-too-interesting" as a typical fable where "orphans find a father, a lonely man finds a good woman, an unsuccessful racer makes good on the comeback trail, and everybody lives unreasonably happily ever after."

== Television show ==
In 1983, there was a spin-off television series pilot of the same name which featured Don Johnson as Brewster Baker and Markie Post as Sally Leadbetter. This show also featured Joaquin Phoenix (billed as Leaf Phoenix) in his second role.

== Home media ==
The film was released on VHS on May 19, 1993. It has been released twice on DVD, the first time on April 4, 2006, followed by a second release on July 3, 2012.

As of 2024, the film has not been released in a digital format.

== In popular culture ==
Six Pack is mentioned prominently in "Breakfast in Dubbo", the ninth chapter of New Zealand-Australian comedian Tony Martin's collection of autobiographical essays, Lolly Scramble: A Memoir of Little Consequence (2005). In "Breakfast in Dubbo," Martin recounts a lengthy bus trip in New South Wales that took place in 1986, during which the passengers were given the opportunity to vote for a movie to watch. Passengers were invited to vote for either Excalibur, Beverly Hills Cop, This is Spinal Tap, or Six Pack. Despite Martin's attempts to drum up support for This is Spinal Tap, the majority of passengers voted to watch Six Pack, to Martin's dismay. Martin recorded a spoken-word version of "Breakfast in Dubbo" which appears as track 27 on the CD Get This: Illegal Download (2006).

Six Pack is mentioned in the TV show Squidbillies Season 2 Episode 11 "Terminus Trouble". In the episode, Early Cuyler, his son Rusty, and the Sheriff make a trip to Atlanta, Georgia and visit a location used in the film.

In 2019, Jonathan Davenport ran a Brewster Baker-inspired paint scheme in dirt late model's biggest race, the World 100 at Eldora Speedway, and won the race. The following year, NASCAR Gander RV & Outdoors Truck Series driver Ty Majeski's truck was wrapped in the style of Brewster's car for the Southern 500 throwback weekend at Darlington Raceway.

The movie was featured on the Kenny Rogers tribute episode of the Disasters In The Making podcast in April 2020.
