= The Underachievers (film) =

- Directed by: Jackie Kong
- Written by: Jackie Kong
- Starring: Edward Albert; Barbara Carrera; Michael Pataki; Vic Tayback; Mark Blankfield; Susan Tyrrell; Fox Harris
- Release date: February 26, 1987
- Country: United States
- Language: English

The Underachievers is a 1987 American comedy film directed by Jackie Kong.

== Premise ==
A narcotics officer goes undercover as a student at an adult night school to locate a drug ring.

== Cast ==
- Edward Albert as Danny Warren
- Barbara Carrera as Katherine
- Michael Pataki as Murphy
- Vic Tayback as Coach
- Mark Blankfield as Kline
- James Van Patten as Todd (credited as Jimmy Van Patten)
- Susan Tyrrell as Mrs. Grant
- Garrett Morris as Dummont
- Jesse Aragon as Carlos
- Fox Harris as Margrave
- Lee Arenberg as Joey
- Monte Landis as Carruthers
- Judd Omen as Corbin
- Burton Gilliam as "Red"
- Jewel Shepard as Sci-Fi Teacher
- Carl Crew as Thug
- Rick Burks as Thug
- Robert Sinaca as a INS Agent
- Alexander Folk as a INS Agent
- Burt Ward as Bowmont
- Roslyn Kind as Mrs. Rasseli
- John Hazelwood as Elmer
- Nili Sinai as Juliet / Israeli Actress
- Bunny Summers as Lily
- Francine York as June Patterson
- Karen Hazelwood as Street Hooker
- Ria Kelly as Louella Labango
- Becky LeBeau as Ginger Bronsky
- DeeDee Rescher as Agent (credited as Dee Dee Rescher)
- Ivy White as an Arab Woman
- Khorshield MacHalle as an East Indian Woman
- Greg Atkins as Coach Legget
- Ruth Britt as a Mexican Hooker
- Beverly Israel as Teacher
- Gregory Wolfe as Wine Teacher
- Marvin J. Bernstein as Prom Queen
