= Marianne Gordon =

American actress

- Born: July 23, 1946 (age 80); Athens, Georgia, U.S.
- Other name: Marianne Rogers
- Occupation: Actress
- Years active: 1965–present
- Spouses: Michael Trikilis (m. 1971; div. 1975) Kenny Rogers (m. 1977; div. 1993)
- Children: 1

Marianne Gordon (born July 23, 1946) is an American actress. Her filmography includes supporting roles in How to Stuff a Wild Bikini (1965), Rosemary's Baby (1968), Little Darlings (1980), The Being (1983) and The Giant of Thunder Mountain (1991), among others. She was also a cast member of Hee Haw.

Gordon's first husband was Playboy producer Michael Trikilis.

She later married Kenny Rogers. Gordon and Rogers had one son together, Christopher Cody Rogers (born 1981). Rogers and Gordon were married for 16 years, and during this time she took his name and thus is known as Marianne Rogers.

== Partial filmography ==
=== Film ===
- How to Stuff a Wild Bikini (1965) - Chickie
- The Legend of Blood Mountain (1965) - Girl drinking Pepsi at party
- The Oscar (1966) - Bikini Girl (uncredited)
- Thoroughly Modern Millie (1967) - Lovely Blonde Girl (uncredited)
- Three Guns for Texas (1968) - Lady with Packages (uncredited)
- Rosemary's Baby (1968) - Joan Jellico, Rosemary's Girl Friend
- The Love Machine (1971) - Model (uncredited)
- Little Darlings (1980) - Mrs. Whitney
- The Being (1983) - Laurie
- The Giant of Thunder Mountain (1991) - Alicia Wilson

=== Television ===
- Dragnet (1967) - Norma Bryant
- Hee Haw (1972 – 1990) - Self
