= Pat Paulsen =

American comedian and satirist (1927–1997)

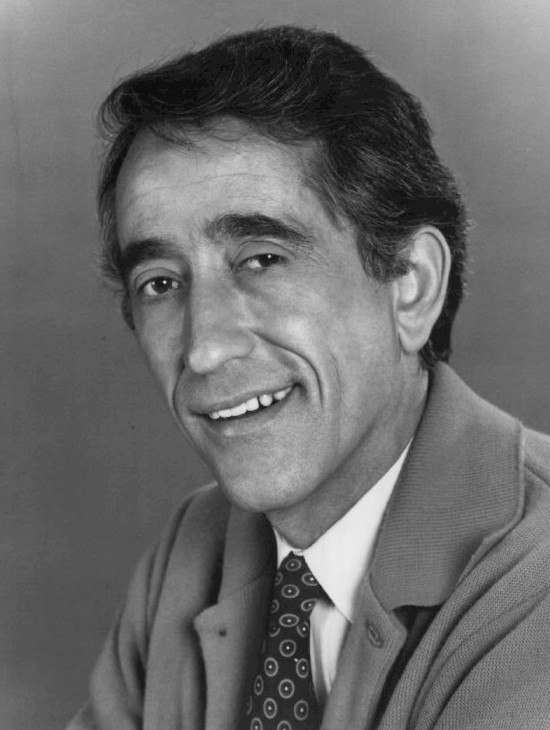
- Paulsen in 1970
- Born: Patrick Layton Paulsen; July 6, 1927; South Bend, Washington, U.S.
- Died: April 25, 1997 (aged 69); Tijuana, Mexico
- Occupations: Comedian; satirist
- Spouses: Betty Jane Cox (m. 1959; div. 1988) Linda Chaney (m. 1988; div. 1989) Noma Littell (m. 1990)

Patrick Layton Paulsen (July 6, 1927 – April 25, 1997) was an American comedian and satirist known for his roles on several of the Smothers Brothers television shows, and for his satirical campaigns for President of the United States between 1968 and 1996.

== Early life and education ==
Paulsen was born July 6, 1927, in South Bend, Washington, a small fishing town in Pacific County. He was the son of Beulah Inez (née Fadden) and Norman Inge Paulsen, a Norwegian immigrant who worked for the Coast Guard. The family moved to California when he was 10, where he graduated from Tamalpais High School in Mill Valley in May 1945.

Paulsen joined the U.S. Marine Corps after high school, when World War II was still being waged, but it ended before he was shipped overseas. However, he did experience overseas duty, including guarding captured Japanese soldiers during their repatriation. He returned home after the war and worked as a posting clerk, a truck driver, a hod carrier, a Fuller Brush salesman, and a gypsum miner. Later, he was employed as a photostat operator for several years. He attended San Francisco City College, then joined an acting group called "The Ric-y-tic Players," and he formed a comedy trio that included his brother Lorin.

== Career in comedy ==
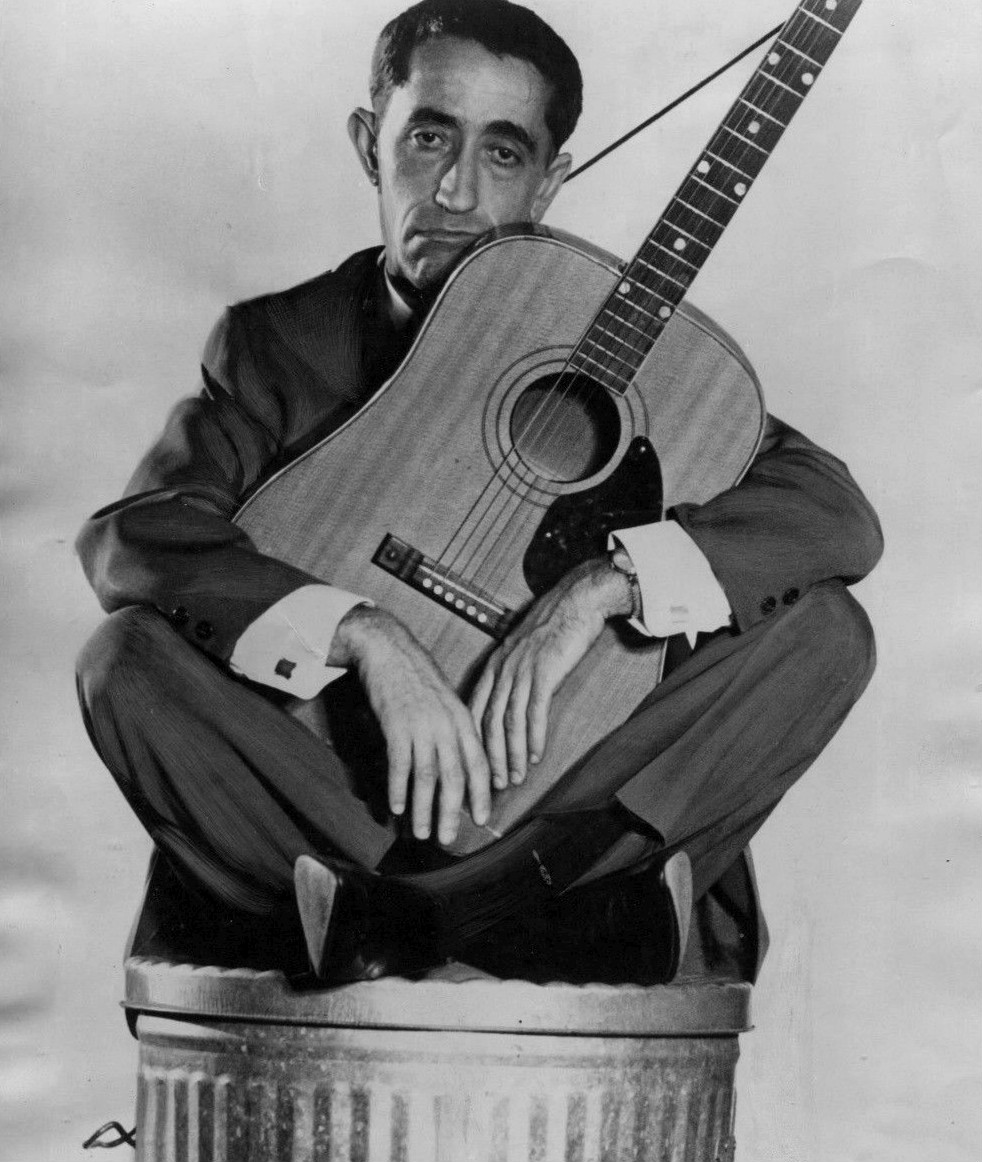
1965 publicity photo of Paulsen

Paulsen developed a solo act, appearing as a comedic guitarist in various clubs on the West Coast and in New York City. He met the Smothers Brothers during an appearance in San Francisco. The Smothers Brothers Comedy Hour premiered in 1967, and Paulsen said that he was hired because he sold them inexpensive songs and would run errands. At first, he was cast as their editorialist, but his deadpan, double-talk comments on the issues of the day propelled him into the national spotlight. His work on The Smothers Brothers' Comedy Hour earned him an Emmy Award in 1968.

Paulsen made a guest appearance on The Monkees in the 1968 episode "Monkees Watch Their Feet", playing the Secretary of National Defense. He also made many appearances on The Tonight Show Starring Johnny Carson. In 1968, he appeared as timid Federal Agent Bosley Cranston in "The Night of the Camera" in Season 4 of The Wild Wild West. During the first season of Sesame Street in 1969–1970, he appeared in a series of comic skits. He was featured in the 1970 Get Smart episode "The Mess of Adrian Listenger". Early in 1970, he headlined his own series Pat Paulsen's Half a Comedy Hour, which ran 13 weeks on ABC. Guests on the first show were former Vice President Hubert Humphrey and an animated Daffy Duck, whom Paulsen interviewed.

In 1971, Paulsen performed in the play Play It Again, Sam at Cherry County Playhouse in Traverse City, Michigan. He enjoyed this professional summer-stock theater so much that he became business partners in 1976 with television writer and producer Neil Rosen and bought Cherry County Playhouse. He starred in a production every summer except 1973, all the way through the 1995 season. He starred in 24 different plays, including The Fantasticks, The Odd Couple, Harvey, and The Sunshine Boys. He appeared in nightclubs, theaters, and conventions throughout the country. In 1984, he co-starred in the film Night Patrol, a vehicle for The Unknown Comic.

== Political campaigns ==
After CBS sold five minutes of airtime on The Smothers Brothers Comedy Hour for a political ad, the show's writers came up with a bit in which Paulsen disclaimed association with the ad and stating that the ad was unfair to him as a candidate. CBS refused to air the bit, but the incident became the impetus for the Smothers Brothers writers launching a Pat Paulsen presidential campaign. Paulsen formally launched his 1968 campaign on March 3, 1968, at a rally at Lonnie's Patio Drive-In in Healdsburg, California, organized by his brother Lorin, a Healdsburg resident; it was billed as the first stop of a national tour. His campaign in 1968 and succeeding years was grounded in comedy, although not without serious commentary. He ran the supposed campaigns using obvious lies, double talk and tongue-in-cheek attacks on the major candidates, and he responded to all criticism with his catchphrase, "Picky, picky, picky". His campaign slogans included "Just a common, ordinary, simple savior of America's destiny", "We’ve upped our standards, now up yours" and "United we sit". He gave essentially the same answer to every question on social issues: "To get to the meat of the matter, I will come right to the point, and take note of the fact that the heart of the issue in the final analysis escapes me." In announcing his candidacy on the Smothers Brothers show, Paulsen said, "Now I ask you: Will I solve our economic problems? Will I ease the causes of racial tension? Will I bring a peaceful end to Vietnam? Sure, why not?"

In 1972, Paulsen ran in the New Hampshire Republican Presidential Primary appearing on the ballot along with incumbent Richard Nixon and Congressman Pete McCloskey (R-CA). Paulsen's name appeared on the ballot in New Hampshire for the Democratic primary several times. In 1996, he received 921 votes (one percent) to finish second to President Bill Clinton (76,754 votes); this was ahead of real politicians such as Buffalo mayor James D. Griffin. In 1992, he came in second to George Bush in the North Dakota Republican primary. In the 1992 Republican Party primaries, he received 10,984 votes total.

== Winemaking ==
In 1971, Paulsen and his then-wife Jane opened Pat Paulsen Vineyards, a vineyard and winemaking operation in Sonoma County, California. Shortly after Clint Eastwood was elected mayor of Carmel, California (1986), Paulsen proclaimed himself "mayor" of Asti, the small town near his vineyard. The office was of his own invention. Paulsen shared a love of winemaking with his political campaign promoters, the entertainers Tom and Dick Smothers.

== Personal life ==
In the 1980s, Paulsen began a relationship with social worker Linda Chaney, whom he met at a Denver comedy club. She began serving as his booking agent and the two were married in 1988. However, he learned that she was diverting his funds into her own personal accounts and he filed for divorce after only 40 days. He later sued her and was awarded a judgment of $233,000, but Chaney said that, even if she had the money, she would "go out and shred it rather than turn it over" to Paulsen.

In 1995, Paulsen was diagnosed with colon cancer and doctors discovered that the cancer had spread to his brain and lymph nodes in 1997. He sought alternative medicine treatment for his cancer in Tijuana, Mexico and died there from complications of pneumonia and kidney failure on April 25, 1997. Paulsen was fondly remembered by fans who enjoyed his mockery of the entire electoral process. "Whenever I’d walk around with him," Tom Smothers said, "people would yell, 'Hey, Mr. President.' We miss him."

== Filmography ==
=== Film ===
Year	Title	Role	Notes
1968	Where Were You When the Lights Went Out?	Conductor	
1970	Brand X	President	
1975	Fore Play	Norman	
1978	Harper Valley PTA	Otis Harper	
1984	Ellie	Sheriff Pete	
1984	Bloodsuckers from Outer Space	President	
1984	Night Patrol	Officer Kent Lane	
1987	They Still Call Me Bruce	Psychiatrist	
1992	Auntie Lee's Meat Pies	Minister	Final Film Role

=== Television ===
Year	Title	Role	Notes
1965-1966	The Smothers Brothers Show	Himself	5 episodes
1967-1969	The Smothers Brothers Comedy Hour	Himself	52 episodes
1968	The Monkees	The Secretary of National Defense	S2:E17, “Monkees Watch Their Feet”
1968	Pat Paulsen for President	Himself	TV Movie
1968	The Wild Wild West	Bosley Cranston	"The Night of the Camera"
1969	The Wonderful World of Pizzazz	Himself	Guest
1969	This is Tom Jones	Himself	Episode 12
1970	Pat Paulsen's Half a Comedy Hour	Himself	13 episodes
1970	Get Smart	Ace Weems	Episode: "The Mess of Adrian Listenger"
1970	Sesame Street	Himself	4 episodes
1970	The Smothers Brothers Summer Show	Himself	3 episodes
1972	The Mouse Factory	Himself	1 episode
1975	Joey & Dad	Himself	4 episodes
1976	Sanford & Son	Percy	1 episode
1993	Rugrats	Additional Voices	2 episodes

== Discography ==
- Pat Paulsen for President (1968)
- Live at the Ice House (1970)
- Unzipped (1998)

== Bibliography ==
- Paulsen, Pat (1972). How to wage a successful campaign for the Presidency. Nash Pub. ISBN 978-0840212580.

== See also ==
- List of notable brain tumor patients
