= Night Screams =

1987 American film directed by Allen Plone

- Video artwork
- Directed by: Allen Plone
- Written by: Mitch Brian; Dillis L. Hart II
- Produced by: Richard Caliendo; Dillis L. Hart, Sr.; Jack Isgro
- Cinematography: Eric Anderson
- Edited by: Herbert L. Strock
- Music by: Michael Linn
- Production company: Dill II Productions
- Distributed by: Overseas Filmgroup
- Release date: September 1, 1987
- Running time: 88 minutes
- Country: United States
- Language: English

Night Screams is a 1987 American slasher film directed by Allen Plone.

== Plot ==
Somewhere in Wichita, Kansas, David is a potential college football star who has just won a four-year scholarship to a college somewhere in Oklahoma. His friends decide to throw him a serious farewell party while his parents are out that night, including D.B, Russell, Joni, Lisa, Frannie, Doug, Chris, Brenda, Mason, and Chuck. Unfortunately, three uninvited guests secretly gatecrash these nightly celebrations. Two are convicts named Runner and Snake who've fled from prison, now hiding out in the home's cellar, while the third interloper is a former mental patient with a connection to David himself.

The party goes into peak. Mason, sitting alone in a rocking chair, is impaled with a fireplace poker. Brenda, who feels rejected by Mason, leaves the party. While driving, someone in the back of the car grabs her, and she gets out and hides under a nearby abandoned car. The killer destroys the car jack, which causes it to crush Brenda to death. Chris and Doug continue to watch pornography. Lisa, Russell, and D.B are drinking while Joni, a new classmate, feels insulted by them and runs upstairs while Lisa confronts Russell about his jokes. Soon after, Chris and Doug find another place to have sex. Joni talks to David about his friends. After making out, Chris goes to swim in the pool. Doug, resting in the sauna room, is killed by a light-bulb cable tossed into the hot stones, releasing poison gas. Soon after, Chris is killed by an axe to the head in the pool.

David is losing his temper, which causes Joni to worry. Frannie and Chuck make out in the Jacuzzi. Chuck goes to the kitchen to cook when the killer forces his face into the grilling pan and stabs his neck with a barbecue fork. Lisa goes down to the cellar to get more wine when Snake strangles her to death. Runner is upset by all the killings, and Snake suffocates him with cling film. Russell is choked to death with a pool cue, and Frannie is electrocuted in the jacuzzi. David's parents hurry home to deliver his prescription when a cop pulls them over for speeding. D.B finds the dead bodies of Russell, Runner, and Lisa. As he attempts to search for others, he is stabbed in the gut. Snake attacks David and is about to kill him when the dying D.B. arrives and fatally stabs Snake. David reunites with Joni and learns she is insane and killed the others except for Lisa. Joni then tries to stab David as his parents and the cop arrive, with the cop opening fire. It is revealed that David had a hyperactivity disorder since he was a kid that causes him to lose his temper. David is blamed for the murders while a still-insane Joni recovers in the hospital, being comforted by David's parents.

== Cast ==
- Joe Manno as David
- Ron Thomas as D. B.
- Randy Lundsford as Russell
- Megan Wyss as Joni
- Janette Allyson Caldwell as Lisa
- John Hines as Snake
- Diana Martin as Frannie
- Jerry Goehring as Doug
- Susan Lyles as Chris
- Barbara Schoenhofer as Brenda
- Dan Schramm as Mason
- Mike Roark as Chuck
- Tony Brown as Runner
- Dennis Arnold as Roger
- Leslie Thomas as Beverly
- William Collier as Jake
- Lucinda Brewer as Lilly
- Troy Mays as Johnny
- Delos V. Smith Jr. as Dr. Tyler

== Production ==
Producer Dillis L. Hart worked as an accountant for Universal Studios before returning to his hometown of Wichita, Kansas, inspired to make a horror film. Hart sought several local investors for the project. Filming took place on location in Wichita.

== Release ==
=== Home media ===
Vinegar Syndrome released a 4K Ultra HD Blu-ray of the film in July 2023.

== See also ==
- Horror-of-personality
- Splatter
- Slasher films
