= Carl Crew =

American actor

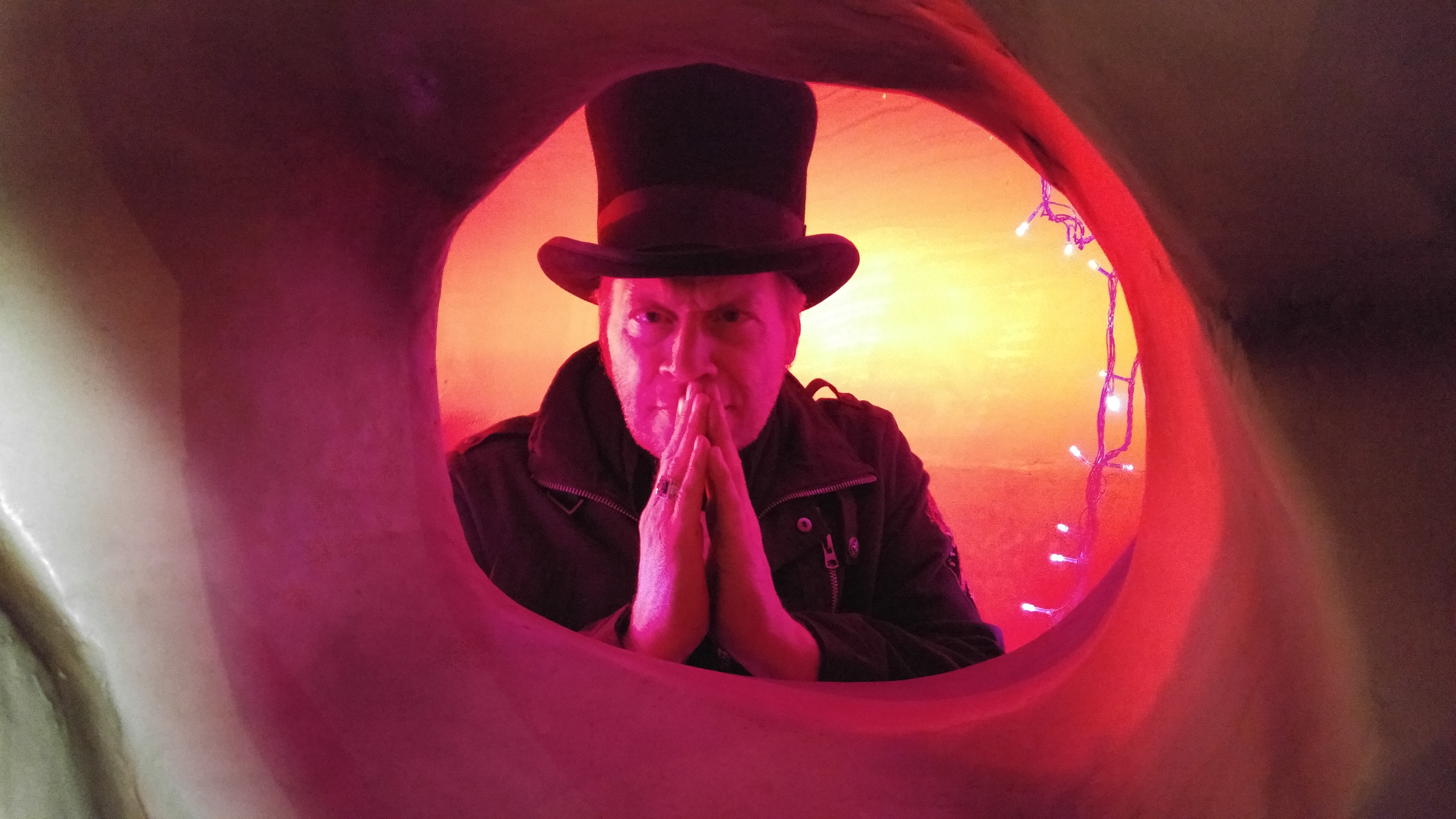
- Carl Crew in the CIA box office.
- Born: Carl Albert Crew; August 2, 1961
- Died: February 20, 2025 (aged 63)
- Occupations: Actor, screenwriter, author
- Years active: 1983 - 2024

Carl Albert Crew (August 2, 1961 - February 20, 2025) was an American actor, screenwriter, author, artist and co-proprietor of the North Hollywood nightclub California Institute of Abnormalarts.

== Biography ==
=== Film ===
Raised in a repertory theatre troupe, Crew spent much of his young life acting and traveling the country in numerous stage productions until the age of 18, when he became an apprentice embalmer for a Marin County mortuary, an occupation he held for four years before deciding to further pursue a career in acting. Crew landed his first major role in the 1987 cult horror comedy Blood Diner, where Crew played the co-leading role of homicidal chef and wrestling enthusiast George Tutman, for which he was allegedly only paid $250. In 1990, Crew wrote and starred in a low-budget gross out comedy aptly titled Gross Out, a Pink Flamingos-esque shock film following a group of siblings attempting to make the most disgusting movie possible to win an inheritance. Despite its excess of scatological humor, The Los Angeles Times offered a positive review of Gross Out, describing it as "funny in a scabrous, admittedly juvenile way" and "thunderingly, gleefully tasteless...a natural for midnight venues".

In 1992, Crew wrote the screenplay and starred as the title subject in Jeffrey Dahmer: The Secret Life, a biopic based on serial killer Jeffrey Dahmer. Shot a mere year after Dahmer's arrest, the film received intensely negative press from both the media and the families of Dahmer's victims, who staged open protests against the film. Crew and director David Bowen appeared on several talk shows including The Maury Povich Show and WISN-TV's Milwaukee's Talking with family members of the victims, defending the movie against their claims of glorifying and exploiting Dahmer's actions. Although The Secret Life was dismally received upon release, it has more recently been positively re-appraised by cult and horror publications; similarly, the Los Angeles Times, in reviewing 2002's Dahmer, compared it unfavorably to The Secret Life, praising the latter's depiction of and Crew's performance of Jeffrey Dahmer, while CraveOnline called the film "fascinating" and "truly compelling".

Crew wrote, produced and starred in multiple roles in the 1994 horror anthology film Urban Legends, directed by Bill Osco, which would ultimately be his last major film contribution. Since then, Crew's acting work has been sporadic, almost exclusively appearing in films by prolific underground filmmaker Chris J. Miller including 2008's Polyphony 2011's Ironhorse 2013's 2035: Forbidden Dimensions and 2016's Mortuary Massacre.

=== Other endeavors ===
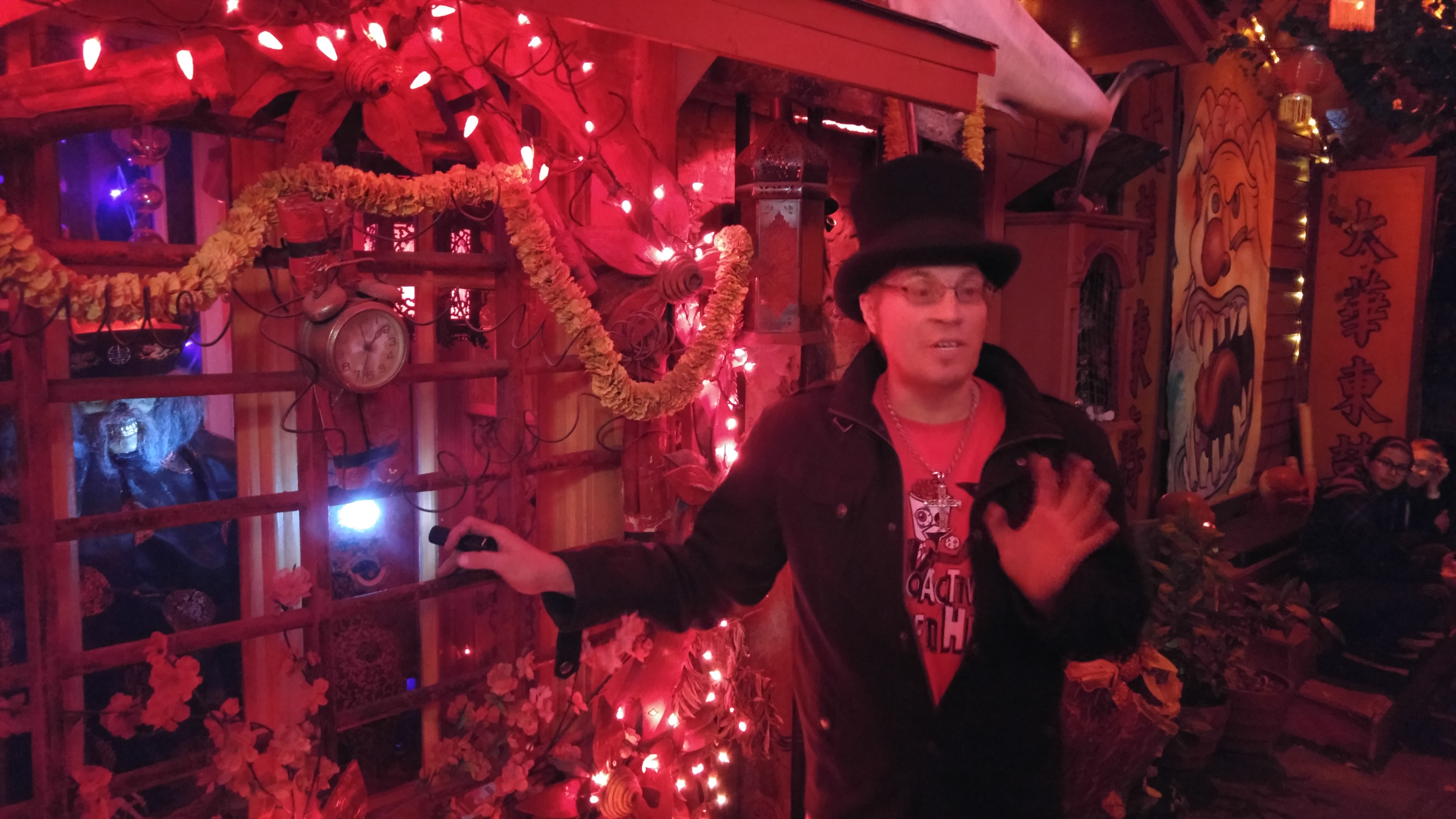
Crew giving a guided tour of the California Institute of Abnormalarts.

During his time as an embalmer, Crew met Robert Ferguson, a fellow mortician who shared his passion for collecting vintage sideshow and carnival memorabilia. In 1994, the two opened a clandestine underground nightclub for unusual bands and performance artists in the North Hollywood district until the venue was inevitably raided and shut down by police. In 2001, Crew and Ferguson re-opened the club as the California Institute of Abnormalarts, a dual nightclub and sideshow museum which hosts weird bands, performers, burlesque acts, freak shows and film screenings and displays a wide array of sideshow memorabilia ranging from Fiji mermaids and pickled punks to the preserved corpse of a late 19th century circus clown. On February 9, 2013, Crew and the CIA were featured on the Discovery Channel reality series Oddities, where Crew gave a tour of the building and its oddities. In 2014 and 2015, the CIA appeared on Halloween-themed episodes of the local interest shows 1st Look (KNBC) and Eye on LA (KABC-TV), both of which featured interviews with Crew.

As the theatrical and colorfully-dressed spokesperson and operator of the CIA, Crew himself has become almost as notable as the venue, with the LA Weekly newspaper once dubbing him "the Barnum of Burbank Boulevard", writing "this cracked cat is a towering local cultural institution unto himself", while the book L.A. Bizarro, a chronicle of "the obscure, the absurd and the perverse of Los Angeles", wrote of him as a "natural-born huckster who would have made a great snake oil salesman back in Deadwood".

In September 2012, Crew and Ferguson authored and published a book through the publishing company Mikazuki Publishing House entitled Freakshow Los Angeles, a historical chronicle of Los Angeles' underground sideshow and circus entertainment.

Crew is the great nephew of Gerald "Jerry" Crew, a prominent figure in Sasquatch mythology as the man who allegedly discovered and made plaster casts of large, unusual footprints in the Del Norte County, California area in 1958, the media coverage surrounding it which led to the coining of the word "Bigfoot". He is also the brother of Mark "Sterling" Crew, former keyboardist for the band Santana between 1985 and 1986.

=== Death ===
In November 2024, Carl underwent what was expected to be a routine kidney stone procedure. After surgery, he was given pain medication, but complications arose shortly thereafter. Despite efforts of medical staff, Carl experienced a serious medical event that resulted in significant brain damage. After months of ongoing complications, Crew died on February 20, 2025, at the age of 63.

== Filmography ==
Year	Film	Role	Other credit(s)
1987	Blood Diner	George Tutman	
1987	The Underachievers	Thug 2	
1988	Terminal Entry		Prop assistant
1990	Gross Out		Screenwriter
1993	Jeffrey Dahmer: The Secret Life	Jeffrey Dahmer	Screenwriter, producer
1995	Art of Nude Bowling		Screenwriter (co-written with Bill Osco), associate producer
1998	Urban Legends	Buzz Fetish / Derek / Judith Kuntz / Susie's Mom / Dr. Hillzbilll	Screenwriter, producer, editor, special effects makeup, art director, set dresser
2004	Shaye & Kiki		Producer
2006	Life on Mars	Carl / Luther Schloss	
2007	Carrion	The Narrator	
2008	Polyphony	Zoltar	
2010	Ironhorse	Nana Sasquatch / Lester Morton	
2012	Keeping the Freakshow Alive	Himself	
2013	2035: The Forbidden Dimensions	Pastor John	
2016	Mortuary Massacre	Mortimer King	
