= Night Patrol (1984 film) =

American comedy film by Jackie Kong

- Directed by: Jackie Kong
- Written by: Jackie Kong; Murray Langston; William A. Levey; Bill Osco
- Produced by: Bill Osco
- Starring: Linda Blair; Pat Paulsen; Jaye P. Morgan; Billy Barty; Murray Langston
- Cinematography: Hanania Baer; Jurg V. Walther
- Edited by: Jackie Kong
- Music by: Michael Hoenig
- Production companies: RSL Company; Vis Arts Consultants Inc.
- Distributed by: New World Pictures
- Release date: November 20, 1984
- Running time: 85 minutes
- Country: United States
- Language: English
- Budget: $4.5 million
- Box office: $8.1 million

Night Patrol is a 1984 American comedy film starring Linda Blair, Pat Paulsen, Andrew Dice Clay, Billy Barty, and Murray Langston. The actor Murray Langston, who portrayed Melvin White, acted as his usual stage persona The Unknown Comic within the film. Blair received a Golden Raspberry Award for Worst Actress in 1985. Reception of the film was generally negative.

== Plot ==
Melvin White is an inept policeman who is demoted to night patrol by his pathologically lying captain Lewis, who has excessive flatulence. White's partner is Kent Lane, who has been a police officer for ten years and loves nothing more than having sex with women in the back of his police car. Fellow police officer Sue Perman is attracted to White, but White does not understand her hints and thinks of her as only a buddy.

White and Lane get involved in various situations that include a couple parked in front of a fire hydrant, people smoking marijuana which they join in, and a male rape victim with a high-pitched voice. In between his duties as a police officer, White is the stand-up comedian The Unknown Comic at night. While in his persona, White wears a paper bag over his head that has holes for his eyes and mouth. White is popular as The Unknown Comic, and he has a chance to become even more famous and rich when talent agent Kate Parker seeks him out. Edith Hutton, a fan of White, is attracted to The Unknown Comic and wants to discover who is under the paper bag. Hutton is even willing to leave her current boyfriend Tex for him. White also has sessions with psychiatrist Dr. Ziegler.

Things become more complicated for White when a thief begins to rob bars at gunpoint while disguised as The Unknown Comic. No one is aware of The Unknown Comic's identity, but Captain Lewis has a suspicion that it is White. To prove that he is innocent, while also trying to hide his stand-up comedian identity, White works with Lane to track down who is impersonating him. White is supposed to perform at a venue as The Unknown Comic, but he is unable to do so because he is on the trail of the thief as a police officer within that venue.

An impersonator of the comedian shows up on stage to perform, while another impersonator enters the place to steal money. White and his partner chase the thief and lose sight of the person on stage. The two of them catch up to the thief, resulting in White and the thief having a Western-film-style gun draw duel. The victor of the duel is White, and an unmasking reveals the impersonator is Dr. Ziegler, who says he wanted to become rich in White's place. White then finds and confronts the second impersonator, who turns out to be Perman. Perman used a recording of White's voice to protect him from being arrested. The film then ends with Perman and White having sex at White's apartment.

== Cast ==
- Linda Blair as Officer Sue Perman
- Pat Paulsen as Officer Kent Lane
- Jaye P. Morgan as Kate Parker
- Jack Riley as Dr. Ziegler
- Billy Barty as Captain Lewis
- Murray Langston as Officer Melvin White
- Pat Morita as Rape Victim
- Sydney Lassick as Peeping Tom
- Kent Perkins as Tex
- Lori Sitton as Edith Hutton
- Andrew Dice Clay as Tony Baroni
- Kitten Natividad as "Big Bust"

== Production ==
=== Development ===
Night Patrol was the second film directed by Jackie Kong, who co-wrote the script with Murray Langston, William A. Levey and Bill Osco. Kong also edited the film. The project began development in 1981.

=== Casting ===
The actor Murray Langston, who portrayed Melvin White, acted as his real-life The Unknown Comic persona within the film.

Andrew Dice Clay has a cameo appearance as a stand-up comedian named Tony Baroni. Pat Morita has a bit part in the film as a rape victim.

=== Filming ===
The film was shot in Los Angeles, with a budget of $4.5 million.

== Release ==
=== Box office ===
The film was released in theaters by New World Pictures, opening regionally in Dallas on November 20, 1984. The film grossed $120,000 during its opening weekend in Los Angeles at sixteen theaters, and an additional $25,000 during its second weekend there. It earned a further $776,218 during its opening week at ninety four theaters in New York City. At the conclusion of its wide theatrical release, the film grossed a total of $8,165,432.

=== Critical response ===
Vincent Canby of The New York Times wrote a positive review, stating, "Though the humor is strictly for the stag-party crowd, which isn't discriminating, the performances have a good, low-burlesque style to them".

A review from TV Guide offered a negative assessment, noting: "This police comedy does the impossible: It makes Police Academy (1984) look like a piece of sophisticated humor". Richard Christiansen of the Chicago Tribune also gave a negative review: "Night Patrol appears to have been made by subnormal persons weaned on Blazing Saddles, Animal House and Police Academy".

Linda Blair received a Golden Raspberry Award for Worst Actress at the 6th Golden Raspberry Awards in 1985 for her performances in this film, Savage Island and Savage Streets.

=== Home media ===
In 1985, the film was released as an unrated extended version on home video by New World Video, the home video division on New World Pictures. The original home video release contained two minutes of footage not seen in the original R-rated theatrical version. Anchor Bay Entertainment released the film on DVD on July 22, 2004. A Blu-ray edition was released by Scorpion Releasing on January 14, 2020.
