= Trash80 =

Timothy Lamb
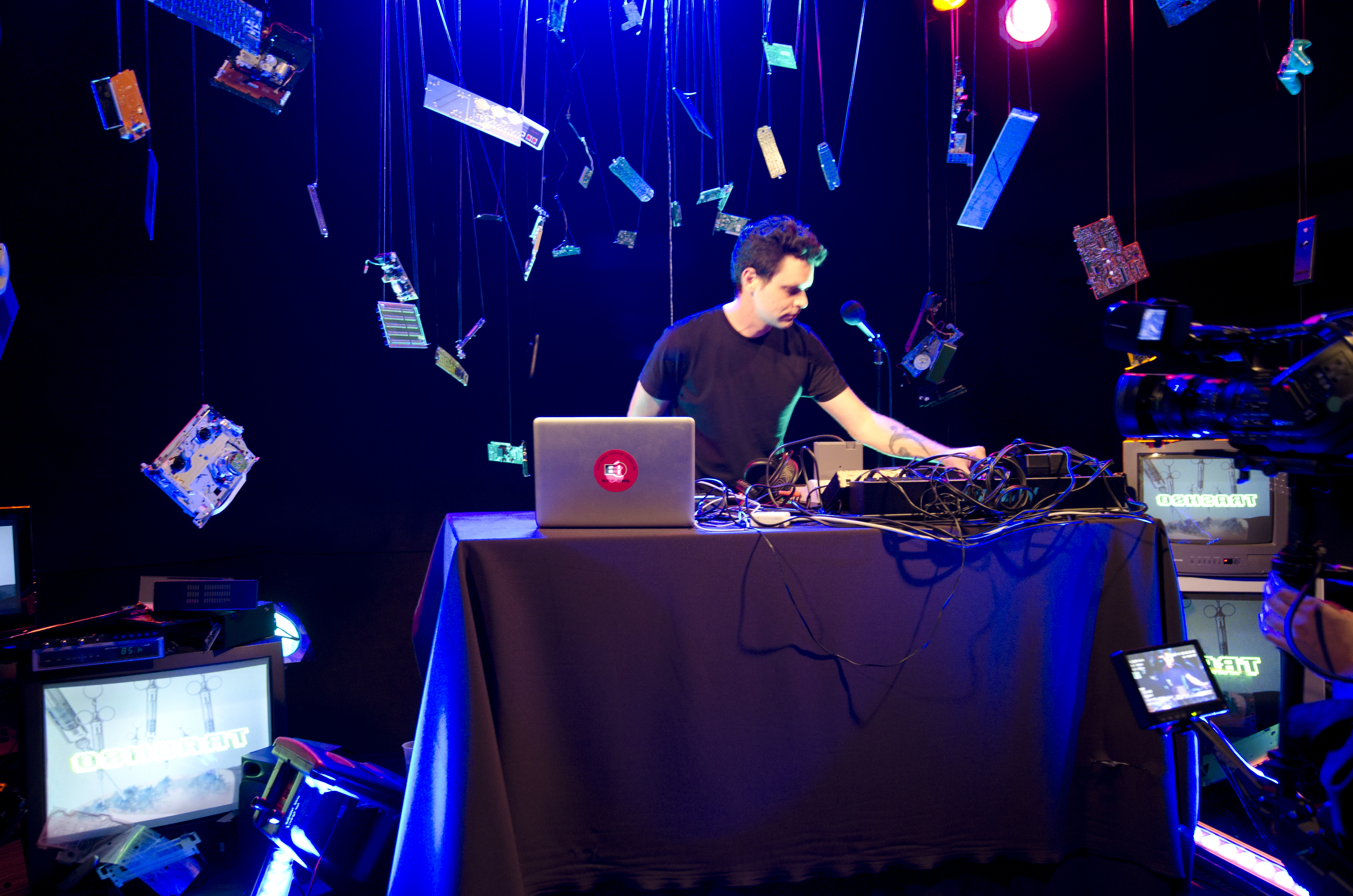
- Trash80 at the Electronic Frontier Foundation's 21st birthday party in February 2011.

Background information
- Born: Timothy Robert Lamb; 5 March 1979 (age 46)
- Origin: San Diego, California
- Genres: Electronic
- Occupation: Musician
- Labels: 8bitpeoples

Trash80 is a micromusic/bitpop project from Timothy Robert Lamb (born on March 5, 1979), a pioneer of independent Game Boy music. He has published several songs online under a Creative Commons license (BY-NC-ND) under the Trash80 and Tresk banners. Whereas many Trash80 songs are ambient soundscapes featuring the use of Game Boy sounds, Tresk songs feature simple piano lines. Most prominently, Lamb's music has been featured on the soundtrack of the real-time strategy game Darwinia.

The name "Trash80" is a reference to a slang term for the Tandy / Radio Shack computer model (now defunct) TRS-80 (model 1/2/3/4/4p).

In 2003 the EP Hologram was released. and in May 2008 the EP Icarus was released.

In the Fall of 2008, Trash80 unveiled the ArduinoBoy, a relatively cheap and easy-to-assemble device that allows MIDI synchronization with a Game Boy running the proper software. As the name implies, it is based on the Arduino open-source microcontroller.

== Dirtywave M8 ==
In April 2020, Trash80 opened Dirtywave LLC, a company dedicated to the development of a hardware tracker called M8. It is a spiritual successor to the LSDJ tracker for the Game Boy, which was most commonly associated with the chiptune scene.

Dirtywave announced pre-orders for the M8 in April 2021.

The tracker is well received by synthesizer enthusiasts. As of early 2023, Dirtywave produced several batches of M8 devices, all of which quickly sold out. New batches have been produced every six weeks during 2025 An updated version, the model 02, has been released with positive reviews.
