= 8 Bit Weapon =

Chiptune music band

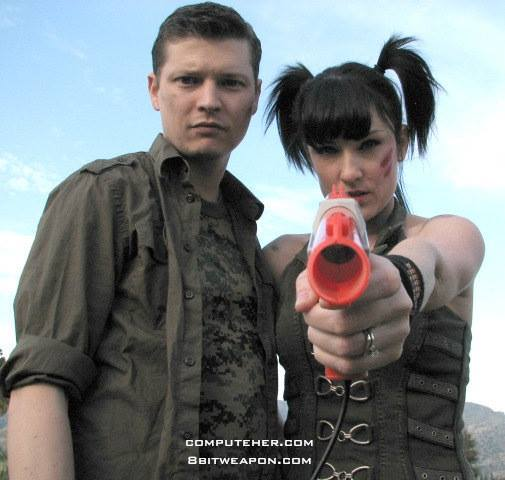
- 8 Bit Weapon at E3 in 2005

Background information
- Origin: Ventura County, California, U.S.
- Genres: Electronic, chiptune, synthpop, bitpop
- Instruments: Computers
- Years active: 1998–present
- Members: Seth Sternberger; Michelle Sternberger (AKA ComputeHer)
- Past members: Melbot; Stacey Taylor (AKA Stacey Superstix)
- Website: www.8bitweapon.com

8 Bit Weapon is an American chiptune music band formed in Ventura County, California, by Seth and Michelle Sternberger. It was originally created by Seth Sternberger around 1998. Its instruments consists primarily of old 8-bit and 16-bit computers (with 8-bit audio output) such as the VIC-20, Commodore 64, Commodore 128, Amiga 500, and the Apple II, as well as game consoles such as the Nintendo Entertainment System, Game Boy, Atari 2600, and an Intellivision synthesizer.

The band started around 1998 by remixing Commodore 64 SID tunes like Crazy Comets, M.U.L.E., and some Nintendo NES game music such as Super Mario Bros. 2 and Metroid. Both the SID remixes can be heard on the album titled "Confidential 1.0" and the Nintendo remixes on the band's official website. Later on, they began writing original music using the Commodore 64, Nintendo Game Boy, and NES, as well as other 8 bit consoles and computers.

The band became well known after favorable coverage in the Los Angeles Times, A live performance on G4's Attack of the Show, and performances at E3 2004, 2005, and 2006. The project with Nokia is the soundtrack for Reset Generation (previously known under the code name "Project White Rock"), a game by RedLynx for N-Gage 2.0 and PCs.

Xbox’s exclusive Halo 2 E3 2004 preview event had its own 15-minute soundtrack written and produced by 8 Bit Weapon, which was played continuously in the gaming area of the party. The band has also remixed music for Erasure, Information Society, and Kraftwerk.

In July 2007, they were hired to perform at Commodore's 25th anniversary party for the Commodore 64 computer.

On March 16, 2012, the Smithsonian American Art Museum's "The Art of Video Games" exhibit opened featuring a chipmusic soundtrack at the entrance by artists 8 Bit Weapon & ComputeHer. 8 Bit Weapon also created a track called "The Art of Video Games Anthem" for the exhibit as well.

In July 2017, they released "Class Apples", the world's first 100% Apple II based music album, featuring dance-oriented versions of classical music by Bach, Beethoven, and Mozart, recorded directly from the Apple II motherboard, including the drum sounds.

In November 2024, 8 Bit Weapon made the world's first "rogue-like" 100% randomly arranged video game soundtrack for Bub-O Burst on Steam. "Every piece of music in Bub-O Burst is randomized. We created randomised music for every portion of the game: the intro, the levels, and even the ending is randomised. Every time a player launches a new game of Bub-O Burst, the soundtrack takes musically interchangeable drum, bass, & lead loops I created from scratch and arranges them into songs with verses, chorus’, and bridges that make the soundtrack."

== Apple II Digital Music Synthesizer ==
On February 9, 2010, 8 Bit Weapon released the Apple II Digital Music Synthesizer (or D.M.S.). Together Michael J. Mahon and 8 Bit Weapon created the 1st wavetable synthesizer for the Apple IIe, IIc, IIc+ and IIGS computers. The software is designed for live performance and it does not require a monitor to work. It supports up to 8 voices, which can be selected from the 10 on disk, and played (monophonically) from the Apple II keyboard. It can be used to “record” a performance for later playback as well.

== Sony Loop Library ==
In April 2009, Sony Creative Software released "8 Bit Weapon: A Chiptune Odyssey" loop and sample Library. The library contains music loops and samples made by the band of the following computers and video game consoles: Apple II, Commodore 64, NES, Game Boy, and the Atari 2600.

== Band members ==
Seth Sternberger: Founded the band around 1998–1999 and is the primary songwriter. He plays Commodore 64/128, Apple IIc, Game Boys, and lead vocals (via vocoder) at live events.

Michelle Sternberger: Joined the band in October 2006 and writes music for the band as well. She also has her own solo releases under the name ComputeHer. She plays Commodore 64/128, Apple IIe drums, acoustic drums, and synths at live events.

== ComputeHer ==
As mentioned above, Michelle has a solo band called ComputeHer. Created by Michelle Sternberger in 2005, she makes music using 8-bit computers and video game console sound chips. Besides her work with 8 Bit Weapon, ComputeHer's most notable work is her contribution to the Smithsonian American Art Museum in Washington D.C. Her music was included in an exhibition called "The Art of Video Games", where she provided the soundtrack to a video of featured video games at the entrance of the gallery. This exhibition traveled to multiple cities following its presentation in Washington, D.C., in March 2012.

ComputeHer has performed at many events. She was mentioned in The Wall Street Journal for her performance at the opening of the International Video Game Hall of Fame in Ottumwa, Iowa, in 2010. She performed at the Sanrio 50th Anniversary I Love Nerds party. ComputeHer performed at the Smithsonian American Art Museum for the Art of Video Games exhibition opening event in March 2012.

Michelle's past projects include music projects for Mark Mothersbaugh of Devo, Foundation 9 Entertainment, Sony Creative Software, and King of Kong: Fistful of Quarters DVD.

Michelle's songs are featured in a video game soundtrack for DeRail Games, Panick Attack, on Xbox Live Marketplace.

== Former members ==
MelBot (2006–2008): Played keyboards at live events. She is now pursuing her solo career.

Stacey "Superstix" Taylor (2003–2005): She played live acoustic drums at live events and on the recordings Official Bootleg, The Limited Edition EP, and all versions of Vaporware Soundtracks. She is also credited for Game Boy programming and as co-writer of various songs on Vaporware Soundtracks.

== Discography ==
- Confidential 1.0 (2003)
- Microsoft Halo 2 Celebrity Pre-Release Party Soundtrack (2004)
- Official Bootleg: Live from Robotopia (2004)
- The EP (Limited Edition) (2005)
- Vaporware Soundtracks: (Limited Edition) (2005)
- "Breathe - Vacuum Mix" for Erasure (2005)
- "Don't Say You Love Me - 8 Bit Weapon Remix" for Erasure (2005)
- Vaporware Soundtracks 2.0: (Standard Edition) (2006)
- High Score Movie Soundtrack: "Gameboy Rocker" (2006)
- "I Like the Way You Werk It - 8 Bit Weapon Remix" for Information Society (band) (2007)
- "Space Lab" off "8 Bit Operators", by Kraftwerk (Astralwerks) (2007)
- "MeanTime EP: An Adventure Through Time!" Limited Edition (2007)
- "Shark Attack - 8 Bit Weapon Remix" for Freezepop (2007)
- Confidential 2.0 (2008)
- Reset Generation Soundtrack (2008)
- Electric High EP (Limited Edition) (2009)
- Tron Tribute EP (2010)
- Silo 64 Soundtrack (2010)
- Bits with Byte (2012)
- Chiptopia: The Best of 8 Bit weapon & ComputeHer (2013)
- Disassembly Language: Ambient Music for Deprogramming Vol. 1 (2016)
- DLC the OST EP (2017)
- Class Apples (2017)

== ComputeHer Discography ==
- Data Bass (2007)
- A Very 8-Bit Christmas Album (2008)
- WANNA HLD YR HANDHELD (2009)
- It's a Chiptune Holiday (2009)
- Modemoiselle (2010)
- Chiptopia: The Best of 8 Bit weapon & ComputeHer (2013)
- BLIPTASTIC! (2016)

== See also ==
- Nintendocore
