= Shaye Saint John =

Fictional character and art project

- First appearance: “Strange Dolly” and “Happy Turkey Day” (1999)
- Created by: Eric Fournier

In-universe information
- Species: Human
- Gender: Female
- Occupation: Supermodel; Internet personality

Shaye Saint John was a fictional character and conceptual art project appearing in a series of short films created by Empty Socket Productions. The character of Shaye Saint John was presented as an entertainer, model, and singer, and claims to hold the world record for having "the most problems".
As the founder and CEO of Save Abused Dolls (SAD), Shaye adopted Kiki, a sick, burnt little doll, who holds a special place in Shaye's world.

== Quotes ==
A review of the character and films states:

- "This stuff ain’t everyone’s cup of tea, and the responses will range from laughter to rolled eyes to serious, goosebump-inducing disturbance. If art is the act of communicating what cannot be communicated in objective terms, this succeeds. Consider yourself warned."
- "My art to me, is a flowery rejection of a child's past, future, and present. Sometimes it's all about me, Ole!"
- "I want everyone to know it's OK to be themself whatever they are... we all can't put on fake faces, now can we? World Peace."

== History ==
A series of 20 shorts numbered as "Triggers" originally circulated on VHS video tapes as early as 1998.
Between 1998 and 2002, these shorts were shown in nightclubs in Los Angeles and Chicago.
In 2003, Shaye Saint John started a blog on LiveJournal, and in 2006, a YouTube channel titled Elastic Spastic Plastic Fantastic was launched, uploading videos between 2006 and 2007.
The original YouTube channel was terminated by YouTube on December 22, 2017.
Fan videos and re-uploads exist, but they are not affiliated with the original creators.
In 2023, Empty Socket Productions launched the official YouTube channel to preserve the original content from the master files, ensuring the integrity of the art.
In addition to the LiveJournal and YouTube pages, Empty Socket established an independent website for Shaye Saint John in 2004 at shayesaintjohn.net. The site remained online for years but eventually went offline, circa 2022.
In 2023, Empty Socket relaunched the official website at shayesaintjohn.us to restore and archive the character's content.
