= Nick Marino =

Nick Marino is managing editor at Paste magazine and a former pop music critic at the Atlanta Journal-Constitution. In addition to Paste and the AJC, his work has appeared in several other music entertainment publications, including Entertainment Weekly, Spin and CMJ.
