= A Friend's Betrayal =

1996 American television film by Christopher Leitch

- DVD cover
- Genre: Drama
- Written by: Hal Sitowitz; J. B. White
- Directed by: Christopher Leitch
- Starring: Brian Austin Green; Sharon Lawrence
- Music by: W. G. Walden
- Country of origin: United States
- Original language: English

Production
- Executive producers: John Cosgrove; Terry Dunn Meurer
- Producers: Jay Benson; Nancy Dara Silverman
- Production location: San Francisco
- Cinematography: Robert Primes
- Editor: Martin Nicholson
- Running time: 94 minutes
- Production company: Cosgrove/Meurer Productions

Original release
- Network: NBC
- Release: May 19, 1996

A Friend's Betrayal, also released as Stolen Youth, is a 1996 television drama film directed by Christopher Leitch. The film starred Brian Austin Green, Sharon Lawrence, Harley Jane Kozak, and John Getz. The reviewers were mostly positive about Sharon Lawrence's performance.

== Plot ==
Paul Hewitt is an 18-year-old amateur photographer, leading an average life with his parents, Dennis and Abby, and sister, Ella. He is a senior in high school and he is in the middle of making college decisions. His parents have always dreamed for him to become a doctor, but he isn't sure if he even wants go to college. One day, the family receives a visit from Abby's friend, Nina Talbert, whose mother recently died. Nina is a photographer as well, designing covers for music albums. Despite being in a relationship with classmate Cindy, Paul immediately feels attracted to Nina. Nina, feeling lonely since breaking up with her married boyfriend, Robert, bonds with Paul. Abby tries to cheer Nina up and convinces her to invite Paul to go with her to San Francisco and look at a college campus.

The sexual tension between them grows and they eventually have sex. Upon their return, Nina, not wanting to face the Hewitt family, plans on returning to New York City. This upsets Paul, who has fallen in love with her and he stops showing any interest in Cindy. While he is spending the night with Nina, Abby goes into his darkroom and is shocked to only find photos of Nina. She decides to go to her place to confront her about this, and she is shocked to find her kissing Paul. Furious, she blames it all on Nina, slapping her. She forbids Paul to see Nina and considers calling the police. Upset, Paul decides to run away from home. Nina is later confronted for a second time, but she shows no remorse, explaining that she loves him.

Paul is glad to hear that she will not return to New York. When they decide to move in together, Abby is determined to do something about it. However, her husband Dennis tells her that trying to drive them apart will only make them want to see each other more. Soon, the news of their scandalous relationship is spread around his school, which makes Cindy break up with him. Meanwhile, Ella's sixteenth birthday is coming up. When she runs into Nina, she lies that she and Paul are welcome to attend her party. However, Abby is furious to see her and angrily sends her away. Ella feels that her party is ruined and tells her mother she hates her. She runs away from home, but is hit by a car. Although she recovers, the accident has a major impact on Paul and Nina's relationship. She decides to leave him and return to New York, allowing him to reunite with his family. Abby eventually forgives Nina, and accepts Paul's decision about not wanting to attend medical school.

== Cast ==
- Brian Austin Green as Paul Hewitt
- Sharon Lawrence as Nina Talbert
- Harley Jane Kozak as Abby Hewitt
- John Getz as Dennis Hewitt
- Katie Wright as Cindy Gerard
- Ashleigh Aston Moore as Ella Hewitt
- Jeremy Renner as Gulliver
- John Carroll Lynch as Mr. Franks
- Chauntal Lewis as Young Abby
