= ComputeHer =

- Origin: Ventura County, California, USA
- Genres: Electronic, chiptune, synthpop, bitpop
- Instrument: Computers
- Years active: 2005–present
- Members: Michelle Sternberger (AKA ComputeHer)
- Website: www.computeher.com

ComputeHer is a band created by Michelle Sternberger in 2005, making music using 8-bit computers and video game console sound chips. She is also a member of the chiptune band 8 Bit Weapon. ComputeHer's most notable work is her contribution to the Smithsonian American Art Museum in Washington D.C. Her music is included in a new exhibition "The Art of Video Games" where she provides the soundtrack to a video of featured video games at the entrance of the gallery. Her Commodore 64 is also on display inside the exhibit. This exhibition is set to travel to multiple cities following its presentation in Washington D.C. in March 2012.

ComputeHer has performed at many events. She was mentioned in The Wall Street Journal for her performance at the opening of the International Video Game Hall of Fame in Ottuma, Iowa in 2010. She performed at the Sanrio 50th Anniversary I Love Nerds party. ComputeHer performed at the Smithsonian American Art Museum for the Art of Video Games exhibition opening event in March 2012.

Michelle's past projects include music projects for Mark Mothersbaugh of Devo, Foundation 9 Entertainment, Sony Creative Software and King of Kong Fistful of Quarters DVD.

Michelle's songs are featured in a video game soundtrack for DeRail Games, Panick Attack, on Xbox Live Marketplace.

== Discography ==
- BLIPTASTIC! (2016)
- Software Remixes (2015)
- "Strangelove" off "8-Bit Operators Tribute to Depeche Mode: Enjoy the Science", by Depeche Mode (2014)
- Chiptopia: The Best of 8 Bit Weapon & ComputeHer (2013)
- "That's Good" off "8-Bit Operators Crack that Chip! Devo Tribute", by Devo (2012)
- Modemoiselle (2010)
- "Kiss My Bits" off Sony Creative Software's “8 Bit Weapon: A Chiptune Odyssey” Loop Library (2010)
- It's a Chiptune Holiday! (2009)
- "Kiss My Bits" off "8 Bit Weapon - Electric High" (Remastered) (2009)
- Data Bass (2007)
