= The Unknown Comic =

Canadian comedian

- Born: Murray Langston; June 27, 1944 (age 82); Dartmouth, Nova Scotia, Canada

Comedy career
- Years active: 1968–present
- Medium: Stand-up, television, film
- Genres: Character comedy, observational comedy, satire, surreal humor, sarcasm
- Subjects: American culture, everyday life, human behavior, pop culture
- Website: therealunknowncomic.com

Murray Langston (born June 27, 1944), who frequently performed using the stage name "The Unknown Comic", is a Canadian actor and stand-up comedian best known for his performances on The Gong Show, where he usually appeared with a paper bag over his head.

== Early life ==
Murray Langston was born in Dartmouth, Nova Scotia, Canada. He left home at the age of 15 because his parents, who were disabled and financially strapped, could not afford to raise him and his younger siblings. He lived in Montreal (Park Ex) before immigrating to the United States by joining the United States Navy. He served during the Vietnam War but never saw combat.

== Career ==
In 1968, Langston began his show business career on Rowan & Martin's Laugh-In, where he did impressions of a fork, a tube of toothpaste, and a grandfather clock. Later, at the suggestion of Redd Foxx, he teamed with comedian Freeman King and they became regular performers on The Sonny & Cher Comedy Hour.

After more than 100 appearances with Sonny & Cher, Langston began to make appearances on other prime-time television shows, including The Hudson Brothers Razzle Dazzle Show, The Wolfman Jack Show, and The Bobby Vinton Show. He also worked with Foxx, Joan Rivers, Jim Carrey, Ruth Buzzi, and many other comedians, as well as creating comedic situations—appearing in several segments—for Candid Camera.

Early in his career, Langston invested in a nightclub restaurant called "SHOW-BIZ". Several now-famous people worked there as servers, including Debra Winger, Michael Keaton (then known as Michael Douglas), David Letterman, Gallagher, Tim Reid, and Freddie Prinze; but the club closed within two years, exhausting Langston's savings.

Strapped for cash, he accepted an offer to appear on The Gong Show. He was reportedly embarrassed about appearing on the show, so with the director's permission, he put a paper bag over his head with holes for his eyes and mouth, memorized a few old jokes, and burst onto the show as "The Unknown Comic". The character, a frenetic speed-jokester in smarmy attire, was a hit and developed a cult following.

"The Unknown Comic" appeared on more than 150 episodes of the Gong Show and served as a celebrity judge on several television shows, including the Gong Show, where he also briefly worked as a writer. He regularly appeared in Las Vegas, appearing on many popular talk and variety shows. In the early 1980s, Langston revealed himself as "The Unknown Comic" on an episode of Real People, where the show's hosts pulled off the bag over his head. He also revealed his true identity after a match on the celebrity edition of the game show Bullseye.

Langston later produced The Unknown Comedy Hour for Playboy TV, followed by The Sex and Violence Family Hour which starred a very young Jim Carrey. He also wrote the screenplays for the films Night Patrol (1984), in which he also acted, Up Your Alley (1988) and Wishful Thinking (1997) as well as being the co-host of The NEW Truth or Consequences (1987). He also played in the children's TV series E.M.U-TV (1989) as "Murray the Technical Director".

Langston is credited as "Actual Unknown Comic" for his appearance in the film Confessions of a Dangerous Mind (2002).

He wrote, directed, and acted in Dirty Jokes: The Movie, and inspired by the hit stage show The Vagina Monologues he created and performed "one man's response" to the show, which he called The Weenie Man-o-logs.

Since 2000, Langston has occasionally appeared as a stand-up comic in Las Vegas and wrote a memoir, Journey Thru The Unknown... As of 2015, Langston has resided in Bathurst, New Brunswick.
