= Blood Diner =

1987 film by Jackie Kong

- Theatrical Poster
- Directed by: Jackie Kong
- Written by: Michael Sonye
- Produced by: Jackie Kong; Jimmy Maslon
- Starring: Rick Burks; Carl Crew; Roger Dauer; LaNette LaFrance; Lisa Guggenheim
- Cinematography: Jurg Walther
- Edited by: Thomas Meshelski; Marc Grimpe
- Music by: Don Preston; Dino Lee; Cecil Dill
- Distributed by: Lightning Pictures
- Release date: July 10, 1987
- Running time: 88 minutes
- Country: United States
- Language: English

Blood Diner is a 1987 American horror comedy directed by Jackie Kong and starring Rick Burks, Carl Crew, Roger Dauer, LaNette LaFrance, and Lisa Guggenheim. It was written by Michael Sonye. The plot follows two brothers setting up a vegetarian restaurant as a front for them to kill women and collect their severed body parts to resurrect the Lumerian goddess Sheetar.

The film was originally conceived to be a sequel to Blood Feast, but it was then changed to be a standalone film of its own.

== Plot ==
Two brothers, Michael (Rick Burks) and George Tutman (Carl Crew) are brainwashed by their serial killer uncle Anwar Namtut (Drew Godderis) into completing his task of resurrecting the ancient Lumerian goddess Sheetar (Tanya Papanicolas). Their mission is given to them once they resurrect him from his grave.

Anwar Namtut is from then on a brain in a mason jar that commands the brothers. In order to complete their mission, the brothers must collect different body parts from many immoral women, stitch them together, and then call forth the goddess at a "blood buffet" with a virgin to sacrifice ready for her to eat. The brothers choose women for their "blood buffet" from those that enter into their wildly popular vegetarian restaurant. Meanwhile, two mismatched detectives (LaNette LaFrance and Roger Dauer) work together to try to track them down before more carnage can ensue.

== Cast ==
- Rick Burks as Michael Tutman
- Carl Crew as George Tutman
- LaNette LaFrance as Sheba Jackson
- Roger Dauer as Mark Shepard
- Lisa Guggenheim as Connie Stanton
- Max Morris as Chief Miller
- Roxanne Cybelle as Little Michael
- Sir Rodenheaver as Little George
- Drew Godderis as Anwar Namtut
- Tanya Papanicolas as Sheetar/Bitsy
- Michael Barton as Vitamin
- John Barton Shields as Little Jimmy Hitler
- Effie Bilbrey as Peggy
- Karen Hazelwood as Babs
- Bob Loya as Stan Saldin
- Alisa Alvarez-Wood as Aerobic Girl
- Al Davis as Blonde Dancer
- Gene Wells as Doctor, Zombie, Wrestling Fan, EMT, also worked with wardrobe

== Release ==
The film was given a limited release theatrically in the United States by Lightning Pictures, Inc. in July 1987. It was released on VHS the same year by Vestron Video. The UK issue of the movie on Vestron Video was heavily cut by the BBFC.

The film has been released on DVD by Lionsgate as part of an eight-movie collection in 2011. It was released on Blu-ray in the US on September 27, 2016, as part of Lionsgate's Vestron Video Collector's Series line.

== Reception ==
On Rotten Tomatoes, it holds a 50% approval rating, based on 8 reviews. Horror review site Horrornews.net gave it a positive review, stating that "I had a blast watching Blood Diner. It is funny, full of some excellent death scenes, and is just a lot of fun to watch in general." In Creature Feature, the movie was given one out of five stars, finding it poorly done on purpose, with every tasteless gag imaginable included. TV Guide found that while the movie was an attempt to pay tribute to the films of Herschell Gordon Lewis, the contempt the director injected into the movie for the source material left little of value.
