= David Jacobson =

David Jacobson may refer to:

- David Jacobson (director), film director
- David C. Jacobson (born 1951), lawyer and diplomat
- David Jacobson (fencer), American fencer
