= Bryan Gordon =

American actor

- Born: Dover, Delaware, U.S.
- Occupations: Director, writer, producer, actor
- Spouse: Jessie Nelson
- Children: Molly Gordon

Bryan Gordon is an American film and television director, writer, actor and producer who is primarily known for directing comedy television shows.

== Early life ==
Gordon was born and raised in Dover, Delaware. He graduated from Dover High School. He graduated from the University of Delaware in 1969. He is Jewish.

== Career ==
After college, Gordon moved to New York City and started his career as a comedy writer on the ABC late night variety show Fridays in the early 1980s. He became an independent filmmaker, writing and directing the Academy Award-winning short film Ray's Male Heterosexual Dance Hall (1987). His other film directing credits include his full-length directorial debut Career Opportunities (1991), written by John Hughes and starring Frank Whaley and Jennifer Connelly and Pie in the Sky (1995) starring Josh Charles, Anne Heche, Charles Grodin and John Goodman.

Gordon has directed episodes on such TV series as Grace and Frankie, The Office, Weeds, Studio 60 on the Sunset Strip, The West Wing, Ally McBeal, Boston Public, Sports Night (also starring Josh Charles), Curb Your Enthusiasm (created, written by and starring Larry David, Gordon's co-worker on Fridays),) Freaks and Geeks and The Wonder Years.

He has directed numerous television pilots — among them One Tree Hill — setting the look and design for the series. He directed and produced the TBS pilot The Wedding Band that premiered in 2012. Also in 2012, he directed the 30 for 30 documentary short for ESPN, "The Arnold Palmer", which was nominated for a Sports Emmy for Outstanding New Approaches Sports Programming in 2013.

In 2009 and 2010, he directed and produced the series Party Down for the Starz Network. In 2015, he co-created, executive produced, and directed Yahoo Screen original series Sin City Saints.

== Honors and awards ==
Gordon has been nominated three times for the Directors Guild of America Award. In 2002, he received its Award for Outstanding Directing for a Comedy Series.

He also been nominated for an Emmy Award twice — both for his work on the HBO series Curb Your Enthusiasm, which he directed numerous episodes over its entire run.

He is a member of his alma mater the University of Delaware's Wall of Fame.

== Personal life ==
Bryan Gordon is married to filmmaker Jessie Nelson. They reside in Los Angeles and have a daughter, actress Molly Gordon (b. 1995).

== Filmography ==
=== Film ===
Year	Title	Notes
1987	Ray's Male Heterosexual Dance Hall	Director and writer
1991	Career Opportunities	Director
1995	Pie in the Sky	Director and writer

=== Television ===
Year	Title	Notes
1977-1978	Laugh-In	Writer, 2 episodes
1980-1981	Fridays	Writer, 37 episodes
1991-1992	The Wonder Years	Director, 2 episodes
1993	Bakersfield, P.D.	Director, episode "The Snake Charmer"
1999	Action	Director, episode "Blood Money"
1999-2000	Freaks and Geeks	Director, 2 episodes
2000	Ally McBeal	Director, episode "The Oddball Parade"
2000	Sports Night	Director, episode "Draft Day: Part I — It Can't Rain at Indian Wells"
2000	M.Y.O.B.	Director, 2 episodes
2000	Gideon's Crossing	Director, episode "Freak Show"
2000	Boston Public	Director, episode "Chapter Four"
2000	The Michael Richards Show	Director, episode "The Consultant"
2000-2017	Curb Your Enthusiasm	Director, 9 episodes
2001	The West Wing	Director, episode "The Stackhouse Filibuster"
2001	Dead Last	Director, episode "Gastric Distress"
2001-2002	Maybe It's Me	Director, 6 episodes
2002	Hidden Hills	Director, episode "Christmas"
2002	That Was Then	Director, episode "Under Noah's Certain Terms"
2002	Do Over	Director, episode "Hollyween (a.k.a. Halloween Kiss)"
2003	Andy Richter Controls the Universe	Director, episode "Bully the Kid"
2003	The O'Keefes	Director, episode "Election"
2003	One Tree Hill	Director, 2 episodes
2004	Jack & Bobby	Director, episode "The Lost Boys"
2005-2006	The Office	Director, 2 episodes: "The Alliance" and "The Injury"
2006	Weeds	Director, episode "Last Tango in Agrestic"
2006	Studio 60 on the Sunset Strip	Director, episode "B-12"
2006	Help Me Help You	Director, episode "Raging Bill"
2007	Life Is Wild	Director, episode "Pilot"
2009-2010	Party Down	Director, 9 episodes; Producer, 15 episodes
2010	Childrens Hospital	Director, 2 episodes
2011	Mr. Sunshine	Director, 2 episodes
2011	The Paul Reiser Show	Director, episode "Pilot"
2011	Man Up!	Director, episode "Wingmen"
2011	Portlandia	Consulting producer, 6 episodes
2012	Free Agents	Director, episode "Are You There, Helen? It's Me, God"
2012	Wedding Band	Director and producer, episode "Pilot"
2012	30 for 30	Director, episode "The Arnold Palmer"
2012	Up All Night	Director, 2 episodes
2013	How to Live with Your Parents (For the Rest of Your Life)	Director, episode "How to Not Screw Up Your Kid"
2013	Trophy Wife	Director, episode "Cold File"
2013	Welcome to the Family	Director, episode "Junior Takes a Stand"
2013-2014	The Neighbors	Director, 2 episodes
2014	Bad Teacher	Director, episode "Fieldtrippers"
2015	Sin City Saints	Creator and executive producer, 8 episodes; Director, 6 episodes
2015	Grace and Frankie	Director, episode "The Dinner"

=== Acting ===
Year	Title	Role	Notes
1975	The Edge of Night	Ewell	Unknown episode
1979	The Seeding of Sarah Burns	Roger Deems	
1979	California Fever	Mel Gaines	Episode "The Underground Jock"
1980	Seeds of Innocence	Dr. Beyers	
1985	Amazing Stories	Father	Episode "Fine Tuning"
1994	Corrina, Corrina	Business Associate	
1998	Sour Grapes	Doug	
