= Jack Kehler =

American actor (1946–2022)

- Born: May 22, 1946; Philadelphia, Pennsylvania, U.S.
- Died: May 7, 2022 (aged 75); Los Angeles, California, U.S.
- Occupation: Actor
- Years active: 1983–2022
- Spouse: Shawna Casey
- Children: 1

Jack Kehler (May 22, 1946 – May 7, 2022) was an American character actor. He was best known for his role of Marty, The Dude's landlord in the 1998 film The Big Lebowski. He also appeared in Men in Black II, The Last Boy Scout, Point Break, Wyatt Earp, Fever Pitch and Waterworld.

== Early years ==
Kehler was born on May 22, 1946, in Philadelphia, Pennsylvania.

== Career ==
Kehler started to act in theatre at the age of 24. He studied with Sanford Meisner and Wynn Handman and became a member of the Actors Studio. His first film role was in Strange Invaders, released in 1983.

In the 1980s, he worked primarily on television, appearing in Hill Street Blues, Cagney & Lacey and St. Elsewhere. In the 1990s, he had roles in several action films, including The Last Boy Scout, Wyatt Earp and Waterworld. He appeared in the Coen brothers' 1998 cult film The Big Lebowski as Marty, the stammering landlord to Jeff Bridges' the Dude.

He recurred as Harlan Wyndam Matson on Amazon Prime's The Man in the High Castle.

== Personal life ==
He was married to his wife Shawna Casey and had a son, Eddie Kehler, and a grandson Liam.

=== Death ===
He died from complications due to leukemia on May 7, 2022.

== Filmography ==
=== Film ===
Year	Title	Role	Notes
1983	Strange Invaders	Gas Station Attendant	
1985	Year of the Dragon	Alan Perez	
1990	I Love You to Death	Wiley	
1991	Point Break	Halsey	
1991	The Last Boy Scout	Scrabble Man	
1991	Grand Canyon	Steve Fox	
1992	White Sands	Casanov	
1994	Wyatt Earp	Bob Hatch	
1995	Waterworld	Atoll Banker	
1996	My Fellow Americans	Wayne	
1997	One Eight Seven	Larry Hyland	
1997	Lost Highway	Guard Johnny Mack	
1998	The Big Lebowski	Marty	
1998	Lethal Weapon 4	State Department Official	
1998	Sour Grapes	Jack	
1999	Austin Powers: The Spy Who Shagged Me	Circus Barker	
1999	The Mating Habits of the Earthbound Human	The Male's Father	
1999	Dudley Do-Right	Homer	Character is mistakingly labeled as "Howard" in the credits.
1999	True Crime	Mr. Ziegler	
1999	Forces of Nature	Vic	
2000	Auggie Rose	Oscar Weeks	
2002	Big Trouble	Leonard Ferroni	
2002	Men in Black II	Ben	
2002	Love Liza	Denny	
2003	Under the Tuscan Sun	Apartment Manager	
2005	Fever Pitch	Al Waterman	Also narrator
2006	Movin' Too Fast	Hank	
2006	Grilled	Dick Abbott	
2006	School for Scoundrels	Classmate	
2006	Invincible	Wade Chambers	
2006	Special	Dr. Dobson	
2007	Walk Hard: The Dewey Cox Story	Press Conference Reporter	
2008	Pineapple Express	Walter - Accountant	
2010	The Last Godfather	Cabbie	
2010	Dirty Girl	Dr. Shelby	
2014	The Sound and the Fury	Earl	
2016	In Dubious Battle	Dr. Burton	
2019	Zeroville	Studio Art Director	
2022	Father Stu	Curtis	Final film role

=== Television ===
Year	Title	Role	Notes
1986	Hill Street Blues	Bobby	Episode: "The Suitcase"
1987	Hunter	Scooter Davis	Episode: "The Cradle will Rock"
1988	St. Elsewhere	Jack Warner	Episode: "Their Town"
1988-1989	Newhart	Tommy Lee Holliday	Episodes: "I Married Dick" "Home for the Holidays"
1989	L.A. Law	Pest Control Exterminator Steve Tumka	Episode: "One Rat, One Ranger"
1990	Father Dowling Mysteries	Angelo Copelli	Episode: "The Passionate Painter Mystery"
1990	Equal Justice	Rodney Kickel	Episode: "Cop's Story"
1990	Cop Rock	Donald Bruckner	Episode: "Bang the Potts Slowly"
1992	Night Court	Fingers Kirby	Episode: "P.S. Do I Know You?"
1993	Star Trek: Deep Space Nine	Jaheel	Episode: "Babel"
1995	Wings	Earl	Episode: "Gone but not Faygotten"
1995	Babylon 5	Timothy Chase	Episode: "Comes the Inquisitor"
1996	Sliders	The Poacher	Episode: "In Dino Veritas"
1996-1997	Murder One	Frank Szymanski	
1998	The Practice	Kyle Peabody	Episode: "In Deep"
1999	JAG	Private First Class Philipp E. Fields	Episode: "Ghosts of Christmas Past"
2001	The Division	George Duncan	Episode: "Secrets and Lies"
2001	Becker	Pete	Episode: "The Ghost of Christmas Presents"
2003	7th Heaven	Walter	Episode: "Stand up"
2003	Angel	Manny	Episode: "Long Day's Journey"
2003	Karen Sisco	Jackie Kinder	Episode: "Dear Dearwood..."
2003	Las Vegas	Aaron Walker	Episode: "What Happens in Vegas Stays in Vegas"
2004	24	Kevin Kelly	Episode: "Day 3: 12:00 a.m. - 1:00 a.m."
2004	NCIS	Tom Wilson	Episode: "Lt. Jane Doe"
2006	The New Adventures of Old Christine	Scalper	Episode: "Exile on Lame Street"
2007	Monk	Harvey Disher	Episode: "Mr. Monk Visits a Farm"
2009	The Mentalist	Playland Owner	Episode: "Red Sauce"
2009	Mad Men	Morris Man	Episode: "Out of Town"
2009	Bones	Malaki Wallace	Episode: "The Goop on the Girl"
2012	Franklin & Bash	Jim Sweeney	Episode: "Jango and Rossi"
