= Artel Great =

American actor

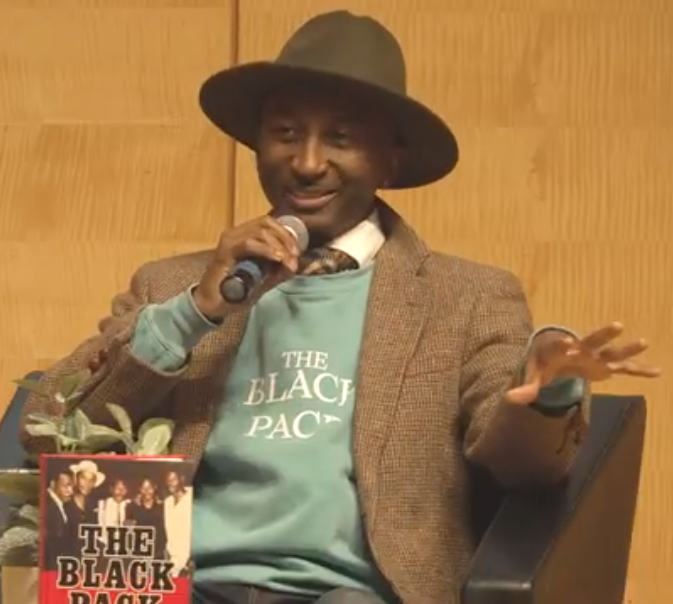
- Lecturing at the San Francisco Public Library in 2026
- Born: September 11, 1981 (age 44); Chicago, Illinois, U.S.
- Website: www.artelgreat.com

Artel J. Great (born September 11, 1981) also known as Artel Kayàru, is an American actor, filmmaker, and Black film scholar. He is known for portraying Rodney in the 2002 film Dahmer.

== Personal life ==
Great was born and raised in Chicago.

He has been married since 2016; Nelsan Ellis was his best man at his wedding.

== Career ==
=== Acting career ===
Great moved to Los Angeles to pursue a career in acting and landed roles in the films Light It Up (1999) and Save the Last Dance (2001).

In 2002, Great appeared opposite Jeremy Renner and Bruce Davison in David Jacobson's Dahmer (2002), a biographical film about serial killer Jeffrey Dahmer. The character he portrayed, Rodney, is based on Tracy Edwards, who was intended to be Dahmer's next murder victim but managed to escape from him and successfully turn him in to the authorities. For his performance in the film, Great was nominated for the Independent Spirit Award for Best Debut Performance. He lost the award to Nia Vardalos for My Big Fat Greek Wedding (2002).

Great collaborated with Jacobson again in Down in the Valley (2005). He also appeared in the 2005 television movie Their Eyes Were Watching God and the 2009 film The Soloist.

=== Other work ===
On June 11, 2010, Great graduated summa cum laude from the UCLA School of Theater, Film and Television. Great earned his MA degree at UCLA and is a PhD candidate at New York University. In 2014, Great was announced a Cinema Research Institute Fellow at the New York University Tisch School of the Arts.

Great is the creator of the Project Catalyst app, which he developed at the New York University Cinema Research Institute.

Great worked as a film studies professor at the University of North Carolina at Wilmington starting in 2019. As of 2023, he is a professor of African-American cinema studies at San Francisco State University.

Great co-edited Black Cinema & Visual Culture: Art and Politics in the 21st Century (2023) and authored The Black Pack: Comedy, Race, and Resistance (2025).

== Select filmography ==
- Save the Last Dance (2001)
- Dahmer (2002)
- Down in the Valley (2005)
- The Alibi (2006)
- Heavens Fall (2006)
- The Soloist (2009)
