= Lynzee Klingman =

American film editor (born 1943)

- Born: December 31, 1943 (age 81); Chicago, Illinois, U.S.
- Education: University of Wisconsin Madison; Columbia University
- Occupation: Film editor
- Spouse: Richard Pearce

Lynzee Klingman (born December 31, 1943) is an American film editor known for her work on films like One Flew Over the Cuckoo's Nest (for which she was nominated for an Oscar, along with Richard Chew and Sheldon Kahn) and A River Runs Through It. She has also taught editing at the University of Southern California.

== Selected filmography ==
Based on Klingman's filmography at the Internet Database.

Editor
Year	Film	Director	Notes
1975	One Flew Over the Cuckoo's Nest	Miloš Forman	First collaboration with Miloš Forman
1977	You Light Up My Life	Joseph Brooks	
1978	Almost Summer	Martin Davidson	
1979	Hair	Miloš Forman	Second collaboration with Miloš Forman
1980	Gilda Live	Mike Nichols	
1981	True Confessions	Ulu Grosbard	
1985	Maxie	Paul Aaron	
1987	Baby Boom	Charles Shyer	First collaboration with Charles Shyer
1989	The War of the Roses	Danny DeVito	First collaboration with Danny DeVito
1991	Little Man Tate	Jodie Foster	First collaboration with Jodie Foster
1992	A River Runs Through It	Robert Redford	
1992	Hoffa	Danny DeVito	Second collaboration with Danny DeVito
1994	Picture Bride	Kayo Hatta	
1995	Outbreak	Wolfgang Petersen	
1995	Home for the Holidays	Jodie Foster	Second collaboration with Jodie Foster
1996	Matilda	Danny DeVito	Third collaboration with Danny DeVito
1998	Hush	Jonathan Darby	
1998	City of Angels	Brad Silberling	
1998	Living Out Loud	Richard LaGravenese	
1999	Man on the Moon	Miloš Forman	Third collaboration with Miloš Forman
2000	Panic	Henry Bromell	
2001	Ali	Michael Mann	
2003	Duplex	Danny DeVito	Fourth collaboration with Danny DeVito
2005	Down in the Valley	David Jacobson	
2006	The Lake House	Alejandro Agresti	
2007	Flakes	Michael Lehmann	
2011	The Beaver	Jodie Foster	Third collaboration with Jodie Foster

Editorial department
Year	Film	Director	Role	Notes
1983	Two of a Kind	John Herzfeld	Additional editor	
1984	Protocol	Herbert Ross	Additional editor	
1988	High Spirits	Neil Jordan	Editorial consultant	
1994	I Love Trouble	Charles Shyer	Additional film editor	Second collaboration with Charles Shyer
1994	Corrina, Corrina	Jessie Nelson	Additional editor	
2009	I Come with the Rain	Tran Anh Hung	Contributing editor	

Thanks
Year	Film	Director	Role
2005	Me and You and Everyone We Know	Miranda July	Special thanks

Documentaries

Editor
Year	Film	Director
1974	Hearts and Minds	Peter Davis

TV movies

Editor
Year	Film	Director
2001	South Pacific	Richard Pearce
2011	Five	Jennifer Aniston; Patty Jenkins; Alicia Keys; Demi Moore; Penelope Spheeris
