= Soldier of Fortune, Inc. =

Television series

- Also known as: SOF: Special Ops Force
- Created by: Dan Gordon
- Developed by: Greg Strangis; Robert L McCullough
- Starring: Brad Johnson; Tim Abell; Melinda Clarke; Réal Andrews; Mark Sheppard; David Selby; Dennis Rodman; David Eigenberg
- Country of origin: United States
- Original language: English
- No. of seasons: 2
- No. of episodes: 37 (list of episodes)

Production
- Executive producers: Jerry Bruckheimer; Neil B. Russell; Greg Strangis (season 1); Robert L. McCullough (season 1); George Schenck (season 2); Frank Cardea (season 2)
- Running time: 45 minutes per episode
- Production companies: Don Simpson/Jerry Bruckheimer Films; Rysher Entertainment

Original release
- Network: Syndication
- Release: September 27, 1997 – May 22, 1999

Soldier of Fortune, Inc. is an American action-adventure television series which ran in syndication from September 27, 1997 to May 22, 1999, about an elite team (composed of mostly former military personnel) who performed "unofficial" missions for the U.S. Government. The series was created by Dan Gordon, and was produced by Don Simpson/Jerry Bruckheimer Films (the company's first venture into television) and Rysher Entertainment.

During the first season, the show dealt with terrorists and drug lords, and often tackled issues such as patriotism and self-sacrifice. The primary cast included Brad Johnson, Tim Abell, Melinda Clarke, Réal Andrews, Mark Sheppard, and David Selby. For the second season, the show was renamed SOF: Special Ops Force. Andrews and Sheppard left the show. Dennis Rodman and David Eigenberg replaced them, though their "hip" characters and new plots led many to abandon the show, leading to its cancellation.

The theme song was performed by Trevor Rabin. During the second season, an introductory voice-over by an uncredited Peter Graves was added.

== Cast of characters ==
=== Season 1 ===
- Brad Johnson - Major Matthew Quentin Shepherd (former U.S. Army Special Forces; counter-terrorism, special recon, unconventional warfare, infiltration, edged weapons)

Major Shepherd grew up in southern California, the son of a United States Navy A-6 pilot who was MIA during the Vietnam War. Shepherd would later graduate from The Citadel in Charleston, South Carolina. It was there that he excelled at various edge weapons ranging from Japanese short sword, to a sharpened deck of cards.

After he graduated, he received a commission in the United States Army, where he served as a platoon leader at the 82nd Airborne Division and was qualified as a member of both the Army Rangers and the Army's Special Forces. It was during this time that he became an expert in infiltration and small team tactics. Later he would become an expert in counter-terrorism when he joined the elite Delta Force. He would show signs of natural leadership and was promoted to the rank of Major.

While on a peacekeeping mission in the former Yugoslavia, Major Shepherd disobeyed a direct order and returned for an injured soldier under his command. This was the first time he would deliver his code "Everybody comes home." Shortly after the rescue the soldier died in Major Shepherd's arms, but Major Shepherd didn't feel that the rescue attempt was a waste because he got to return the body to the young man's family. After this incident, the Army nearly court-martialled Major Shepherd for disobeying a direct order; however, they instead accepted his resignation. Despite the discharge, he continued to have the respect of his fellow soldiers.

Following his discharge he would be recruited by Xavier Trout, to go on one mission for the U.S. government inside Iraq. Trout felt that the mission would offer the government plausible deniability because none of his team would be connected as active duty soldiers to an actual government. If captured, Major Shepherd and his team would have been executed as spies, so Trout offered them one million dollars if they were successful. Major Shepherd then recruited six others for his mission, Benny Ray Riddle, Margo Vincent, Chance Walker, C.J. Yates, Gunter Hauer and Rico Valesquez. The team would complete the mission but not before the death of Hauer and the injuring of Valesquez. Instead of taking the million dollars, Major Shepherd would ask Trout give the money to Hauer's family and help pay for Valesquez's physical rehabilitation. He would submit a bill for their services and would continue to accept missions like the previous one for the government.

As a cover, Major Shepherd runs a bar and grill called the Silver Star. The Silver Star had a secret room in which Maj. Shepherd and his team would meet to plan missions, and store weapons, supplies and spare money.

- Tim Abell - Staff Sergeant Benny Ray Riddle (former U.S. Marine; scout sniper, armorer)

Benny Ray Riddle enlisted in the United States Marine Corps right out of high school. Because he was from Alabama, he received his training at Parris Island. Upon the completion of training Riddle would be accepted into the elite Scout Snipers, where he became a skilled marksman, a member of Marine Force Reconnaissance, and expert in a variety of firearms. Riddle would eventually be promoted to Staff Sergeant.

While on a United Nations peacekeeping mission Staff Sergeant Riddle refused a direct order from a UN officer. He believed that as an American, he should not take a direct order from a foreign officer. The Marine Corps disagreed, and he would be court-martialed and discharged from the Marines. When Major Shepherd recruited him, he was employed teaching target shooting at a private shooting range.

Riddle is divorced and has three children. One of which is a son named Billy, who he likes to have "man-to-man talks" while they are fishing. Riddle was known for not being very talkative, and was sometimes teased by his teammates as being a little bit obsessive. For example, he doesn't use any scented, detergents, soaps or shampoo, on the theory that it might give away his position to the enemy.

Benny Ray is usually seen driving around in his beloved Harley Davidson motorcycle. He also is a huge fan of country music. In the first-season finale, C.J. and Chance were wondering what they would miss if they bought it on the mission. Benny Ray said he would miss his kids, his ex-wife and Shania Twain. "Not more than the kids, but more than the ex-wife."

- Melinda Clarke - Margo Vincent (former CIA GS-14; intelligence, cryptography, linguistics)

Margo Vincent was born in Bucharest, Romania; she emigrated to the United States at age six, and became a naturalized citizen. Margo developed a knack for learning languages and would eventually master six languages and become proficient in several others. Over the course of the series she demonstrated familiarity with Romanian, English, French, and some Arabic. She was told on one occasion that her Portuguese was horrible. She was a good student and graduated high school early.

Margo's skill with language and intelligence led to her being recruited by the Central Intelligence Agency, as an expert primarily in Eastern Europe. At one point she was the CIA's station chief for Moscow in the Soviet Union. One of her spies was compromised by a KGB counter-espionage expert, who seduced the agent's wife and sent photos of their affair to him and Margo. It is unclear if this was the reason why she would end up leaving the CIA, but apparently she was fired.

After leaving the agency, she initially worked in industrial espionage as a freelancer. This may have been where she developed underworld contacts for buying illegal arms. When Major Shepherd initially recruited her she was leaving for a potential job in France. However he convinced her to come work with him as an opportunity to make a difference, as his team's intelligence officer.

Although Chance was the second highest-ranking military officer, usually Margo was shown acting as Major Shepherd's second in command. It is implied throughout the show that the two of them shared a mutual attraction. In one episode when Major Shepherd was in a coma, he dreamed that he told her that he loved her. On more than one mission she seemed a little more concerned about him than just as a colleague. However, during the show's run their relationship never developed.

- Réal Andrews - First Lieutenant Jason "Chance" Walker (former U.S. Army; aviation expert, close quarters combat specialist)

Lieutenant Chance Walker is a skilled martial artist; which martial arts are never made clear but probably those originating in Japan. When he was in the Army, he was a member of the elite 160th Special Operations Aviation Regiment, also known as the Night Stalkers. He showed expertise in flying everything from a variety of helicopters, turboprop planes and small passenger jets. He left the army due to a knee injury, however throughout the season he would show little signs of any complications from the injury. For example, he still jumped out of planes, fought, and trekked through hard terrain.

Chance was working as a high school track and field coach when Major Shepherd initially recruited him for the team's first mission. Major Shepherd says that he got his nickname of "Chance", because he never takes one. For example, he rolls his own parachute before missions.

At the start of the second season it is stated that Chance and C.J. have moved to Hawaii, and started a business.

- Mark Sheppard - Staff Sergeant Christopher "C.J." Yates (former SAS; demolitions, electronic surveillance)

Christopher "C.J." Yates was the son of a British soldier and an Irish mother. C.J. enlisted in the British Army after finishing high school. At one point he served in a tank unit, as well as serving in the infantry. He tried out, and after three attempts would get into the elite 22nd Special Air Service or 22 SAS. Yates's specialty was explosives, however he was also trained in electronic surveillance. There is some suggestion that he may have been trained as a member of MI6, but this was never confirmed during the series. Yates was also a skilled rock climber.

On an SAS mission in Libya C.J. was captured. During the experience he was tortured over an extended period of time. C.J. claimed that all he told them was useless info such as who was the greatest drummer of all time. However it has been implied that he may have told them more than that. The experience left him with a lifelong hatred of the Libyans. It was never made clear if this was the reason he left the army.

Throughout the first season C.J. was used primarily for comedic relief. Known for the occasional wisecrack, and having a slightly strange sense of humor, he was still a very capable soldier. When Major Shepherd first contacted him, he was working in construction making use of his demolition training. It is never made clear what business he and Chance went into when they left the team for Hawaii.

- David Selby - Xavier Trout (government liaison)

Xavier Trout was a U.S. Army officer. In the series premiere, Maj. Shepherd addresses him as Colonel Trout, then asks if it's now General Trout. Trout says that he no longer has a rank, he is just a number on an office door. It is implied throughout the show that he now works for the National Security Council, running covert operations for the government. It is never made clear as to whether or not Major Shepherd's team is his only responsibility or are there other covert teams he runs.

Most other information about Trout is classified and very little is revealed about him throughout the series of the show. He did several tours in Vietnam, first in the 101st Airborne Division, then as a member of the Army Rangers, and finally as a Green Beret. Trout would later be one of the officers that helped start Delta Force. It was in this capacity as a training officer that he would first meet Major Shepherd.

Trout keeps himself in shape by running at least two miles every day. Trout is divorced from his first wife but currently happily married to his second wife. He and his second wife tried for a long time to have a child before they conceived a daughter, Alison. Alison Trout is a covert operative for the CIA, with a cover that she works for the United States Department of State.

=== Season 2 ===
- Dennis Rodman - Chief Warrant Officer Deacon "Deke" Reynolds (former U.S. Army; helicopter pilot, demolitions)

Deacon Reynolds entered the army after a judge gave him a choice between the military or jail. During his time in the Army he initially served as a demolitions expert before he became a warrant officer and would transfer to aviation. Deke also served in Operation Desert Storm.

Although Reynolds had chosen the army over jail, he never fit into the military culture. He had several insubordination charges in his file, and eventually received a court martial. At this time he would be recruited by Colonel Earl Swanee to perform covert missions for the U.S. government. Swanee could be said to have a similar relationship to Deke that Trout would have with Shepherd's team. However, Deke was not much of team player and would spend most of his time working solo missions. It is implied he has several connections to the underworld black market using this knowledge to provide the team with intel and equipment. When actually with the team, he replaces Chance as the group's helicopter pilot.

After Colonel Swanee's death, Trout asked the team (at this point consisting of only Shepherd, Vincent, and Riddle) to investigate the possibility that it was murder. At the funeral they would meet Deke, who arrived late and kissed Swanee's corpse. Deke agreed to help them find out who had killed his late mentor. When they had accomplished this, Deke, continued to work with the team under Trout. However, he was never a full-time member, usually showing up at the right moment when the team need his help.

Dennis Rodman was still playing basketball with the Chicago Bulls and could not always get time off to shoot for the show.

- David Eigenberg - Nick Delvecchio (former DEA Special Operations GS-13; undercover operations, escape artist)

Nick Delvecchio grew in an Italian-American neighborhood in New York City. Delvecchio had a lifelong fascination with magic tricks. He would become an expert at various forms of sleight of hand, lock picking and escape artistry.

Delvecchio left his neighborhood and then girlfriend behind to pursue a career in the Justice Department's Drug Enforcement Administration or the DEA. Leaving behind his girlfriend was one of his early regrets, but he felt it was necessary to pursue his career. During his tenure at the DEA he specialized in undercover work.

It was while he was working undercover that he would meet the team, Shepherd, Margo, and Benny Ray. They had no idea that Delvecchio was undercover thinking that he was actually a part of a drug runner's gang. After they realized that they were all on the same side, they would work together to bring the dealer down. With this completed Delvecchio joined the team on a full-time basis.

Delvecchio lacked a military background, and was somewhat sensitive about the fact. For example, he did not know that a klick meant a kilometer. However his knowledge of the drug trade would sometimes come in handy. He would replace C.J. as the team's comic relief as well as electronics specialist.

=== Other members ===
- Billy Gallo - Ricardo "Rico" Valesquez (former Navy SEAL; underwater infiltration, combat medic, signals)

Rico Valesquez was a former Navy Corpsmen who joined the SEALs. Little is known about Petty Officer Valesquez, on account that he was not a regular member of the team. When Major Shepherd first recruited him, he was no longer in the Navy but was working as an EMT in Los Angeles, California. After he got a victim to the hospital, he was seen praying for her using a crucifix. This implies that he was probably a Roman Catholic.

Valesquez was injured in their first mission as a team, when he was shot in the arm. He would attend rehab and would eventually get full use of his arm back. Rico would later be seen aiding Major Shepherd in his rehab after the Major was shot in both his legs. It is unclear as to whether or not Rico was doing full-time rehab or if he just came back to help Major Shepherd.

Rico would make another appearance to aid the team when Katrina Herrera would kidnap Benny Ray's son.

- Brian Cousins - Lieutenant Gunter Hauer (former GSG 9; demolitions, electrical engineering.)

Gunter Hauer was from Germany, other than C.J., he was the only member of the team who was not an American. During the first mission he was seen portraying a UN inspector in Iraq. However he died before the team left Iraq, Shepard the one who carried him "home"; as such very little about him was ever explained. Shepard had some of the payment go to Hauer and his family.

Although Hauer is supposed to be German, the actor who played him, Brian Cousins, was in fact born in Portland, Maine.

== Episodes ==
=== Season 1 (1997–98) ===
No. overall	No. in season	Title	Directed by	Written by	Original release date
1	1	"Genesis"	Robert Radler	Story by : Dan Gordon; Teleplay by : Dan Gordon and Greg Strangis & Robert L. McCullough	September 27, 1997
2	2	"Power Corrupts"	Robert Radler	Michael Marks	October 4, 1997
3	3	"Over the Wire"	Greg Yaitanes	Greg Strangis & Robert L. McCullough	October 11, 1997
4	4	"For Love or Money"	Whitney Ransick	Duke Sandefur	October 18, 1997
5	5	"Alpha Dogs"	Oscar Costo	Duke Sandefur	October 25, 1997
6	6	"Broken Play"	Peter Bloomfield	Greg Strangis & Robert L. McCullough	November 1, 1997
7	7	"Collateral Damage"	Greg Yaitanes	Greg Strangis & Robert L. McCullough	November 8, 1997
8	8	"La Mano Negra"	Robert Radler	John F. Mullins	November 15, 1997
9	9	"Missing in Action"	Randall Zisk	Donald R. Boyle	November 22, 1997
10	10	"Last Chance"	Robert Radler	Greg Strangis & Robert L. McCullough	January 24, 1998
11	11	"When the Hammer Falls"	Oscar Costo	Duke Sandefur & James Cappe	January 31, 1998
12	12	"Surgical Strike"	Michael Shapiro	James Cappe & Duke Sandefur	February 7, 1998
13	13	"Hired Guns"	Greg Yaitanes	Greg Strangis & Robert L. McCullough	February 14, 1998
14	14	"Deja Vu: Part 1"	Peter Bloomfield	Greg Strangis & Robert L. McCullough	February 21, 1998
15	15	"Apres Vu: Part 2"	Peter Bloomfield	Greg Strangis & Robert L. McCullough	February 28, 1998
16	16	"Scorned"	Richard Compton	James Cappe	April 25, 1998
17	17	"Tight Spot"	Jason Bloom	Greg Strangis & Robert L. McCullough	May 2, 1998
18	18	"Double-Edged Sword"	Peter Bloomfield	Philip John Taylor	May 9, 1998
19	19	"Payback"	Neil Abramson	James Cappe	May 16, 1998
20	20	"Top Event"	Winrich Kolbe	Neil Livingstone	May 23, 1998

=== Season 2 (1998–99) ===
No. overall	No. in season	Title	Directed by	Written by	Original release date
21	1	"Wild Card"	Peter Bloomfield	George Schenck & Frank Cardea	September 26, 1998
22	2	"Who's Who"	Peter Bloomfield	Robert L. McCullough & Greg Strangis	October 3, 1998
23	3	"Spyder's Web"	Reynaldo Villalobos	Tony Blake & Paul Jackson	October 10, 1998
24	4	"Party Girl"	Jason Bloom	Tom Chehak	October 17, 1998
25	5	"A Walk in the Park"	Jason Bloom	Robert L. McCullough & Greg Strangis	October 24, 1998
26	6	"Trade Off"	Peter Bloomfield	Robin Jill Burger	October 31, 1998
27	7	"Iraq and Roll"	Reynaldo Villalobos	Christopher Mack	November 7, 1998
28	8	"Hide and Seek"	Peter Bloomfield	Ashley Gable & Tom Swyden	November 14, 1998
29	9	"Charade"	Jason Bloom	Schuyler Kent	November 21, 1998
30	10	"Tethered Goat"	Jason Bloom	Robert L. McCullough & Greg Strangis	February 6, 1999
31	11	"Figure Eight"	Steve Yaconelli	David A. Weinstein and Tony Blake & Paul Jackson	February 13, 1999
32	12	"The Lord is My Shepherd"	Reynaldo Villalobos	Michael Rhodes	February 20, 1999
33	13	"Critical List"	Jason Bloom	Robin Jill Burger	February 27, 1999
34	14	"Welcome to Bent Copper"	Peter Bloomfield	Ashley Gable & Tom Swyden	May 1, 1999
35	15	"White Dragon"	Peter Bloomfield	Tony Blake & Paul Jackson	May 8, 1999
36	16	"The Vestige"	Steve Yaconelli	Bazzel Baz	May 15, 1999
37	17	"Reasonable Doubts"	Peter Bloomfield	George Schenck & Frank Cardea	May 22, 1999

== Sponsors ==
Products of certain sponsors would be conspicuously mentioned and/or displayed throughout the show. Sponsors of the show would include SIG Sauer, Ka-Bar, SureFire, Emerson Knives, and Soldier of Fortune Magazine.

In the second season of the show, SIG Sauer pistols (particularly two-tone SIG Sauer .357s) would be in highly visible use by the team, and also verbally mentioned on many occasions. Margot would even be given a SIG P230/232 (sans serial number) for her birthday.

Matt (and other characters) would often be seen wearing a Ka-Bar fighting knife on their torso (Ka-Bar being another regular sponsor of the show).

In one episode, one character would state that he had a subscription to Soldier of Fortune magazine.
