= Party Down =

American sitcom

- Genre: Sitcom
- Created by: John Enbom; Rob Thomas; Dan Etheridge; Paul Rudd
- Showrunner: John Enbom
- Starring: Adam Scott; Ken Marino; Jane Lynch; Ryan Hansen; Martin Starr; Lizzy Caplan; Jennifer Coolidge; Megan Mullally; Jennifer Garner; Tyrel Jackson Williams; Zoë Chao
- Composer: Josh Kramon
- Country of origin: United States
- Original language: English
- No. of seasons: 3
- No. of episodes: 26

Production
- Executive producers: John Enbom; Rob Thomas; Dan Etheridge; Paul Rudd; Adam Scott
- Producers: Fred Savage (seasons 1–2); Bryan Gordon; Nancy van Doornewaard; Jennifer Dugan; Maria Melograne
- Camera setup: Single-camera
- Running time: 26–31 minutes
- Production companies: Tree; Starz Entertainment (seasons 1–2); Spondoolie Productions (season 3); Lionsgate Television (season 3)

Original release
- Network: Starz
- Release: March 20, 2009 – June 25, 2010
- Release: February 24 – March 31, 2023

Party Down is an American sitcom created and primarily written by John Enbom, Rob Thomas, Dan Etheridge, and Paul Rudd that premiered on the Starz network in the United States on March 20, 2009. The series follows a group of caterers in Los Angeles as they hope to make it in Hollywood.

After two seasons, Starz canceled Party Down on June 30, 2010. While the show was warmly received by critics, its Nielsen ratings were very low. In November 2021, a six-episode revival of the series was ordered by the network. The third season premiered on February 24, 2023, and was later categorized as a limited series revival.

== Premise ==
This half-hour comedy follows a group of aspiring actors, writers, and others working for a Los Angeles-based catering company named Party Down. The group works small-time catering gigs while hoping for their break or some positive change in their lives. Each episode finds the team working a new event, and inevitably getting tangled up with the colorful, affluent guests and their absurd lives.

== Cast ==
The season two cast. From left to right: Ryan Hansen as Kyle Bradway, Martin Starr as Roman DeBeers, Lizzy Caplan as Casey Klein, Megan Mullally as Lydia Dunfree, Adam Scott as Henry Pollard and Ken Marino as Ron Donald.

=== Main cast ===
- Adam Scott as Henry Pollard, a failed actor who returns to Party Down catering after he quit acting. Apathetic and a perpetual underachiever, he often plays straight man to the rest of his coworkers and is most often the most level-headed of the group. His romantic relationship with Casey is a recurring element in the show.
- Ken Marino as Ronald Wayne "Ron" Donald, the prideful team leader of Party Down catering who is very uptight when it comes to work and strives for customer satisfaction. He is a recovering alcoholic and drug addict, although he relapses when under pressure from work as he suffers from low self-esteem. His dream is to own a Soup R' Crackers, a franchise that offers all-you-can-eat soup. Months after obtaining funding and opening his restaurant, the business shuts down, forcing Ron to return to Party Down but this time not as team leader.
- Lizzy Caplan as Casey Klein (seasons 1–2; guest star season 3), a struggling comedian and actress who often disregards authority, especially Ron's. She was married at the start of the series but got divorced and started a relationship with Henry to make a "clean break" from her marriage.
- Ryan Hansen as Kyle Bradway, an aspiring actor, sometimes model, and front man for the band Karma Rocket. He believes he is the "total package" and is just waiting for his big break.
- Martin Starr as Roman DeBeers, a screenwriter who is a professed fan and author of hard science fiction. Often frustrated by his lack of success, he harshly judges his colleagues and party guests with an acerbic wit.
- Jane Lynch as Constance Carmell (seasons 1 and 3; guest star season 2), a former actress who befriends and mentors aspiring actor Kyle. Lynch did not appear in the last two episodes of the first season due to her commitment to Glee. Lynch guest starred in the final episode of the second season.
- Jennifer Coolidge as Bobbie St. Brown (season 1, episodes 9 and 10), Constance's roommate who replaces her on the Party Down team during her absence.
- Megan Mullally as Lydia Dunfree (seasons 2–3), a recent divorcee who has moved to Hollywood hoping to achieve stardom for her 13-year-old daughter Escapade. She is very optimistic and naive, constantly seeking advice from people in the entertainment business.
- Jennifer Garner as Evie Adler (season 3), a film producer who is reevaluating her life and career.
- Tyrel Jackson Williams as Sackson (season 3), a Party Down employee and content creator.
- Zoë Chao as Lucy Dang (season 3), a Party Down employee and aspiring food artist and celebrity chef.

=== Recurring cast ===
- J. K. Simmons as Leonard Stiltskin, disgruntled, foul-mouthed film producer who appears in season 1's "Taylor Stiltskin Sweet Sixteen" and season 2's "Precious Lights Pre-School Auction".
- Joey Lauren Adams as Diandra Stiltskin, Leonard's unhappy and unfaithful wife who tries to seduce Kyle, appearing in season 1's "Taylor Stiltskin Sweet Sixteen" and season 2's "Precious Lights Pre-School Auction".
- Ken Jeong as Alan Duk, original Party Down CEO who purchases one of Ron's "Soup 'R Crackers", appearing in season 1's "Sin Say Shun Awards After Party" and "Stennheiser-Pong Wedding Reception". Duk was tried and convicted for white collar crimes before season 2.
- Kristen Bell as Uda Bengt, the uptight leader of Valhalla Catering who eventually starts a relationship with Henry after Casey leaves. She appears in season 1's "Stennheiser-Pong Wedding Reception" and season 2's "Party Down Company Picnic".
- Aviva Farber as Mandy, Ron's girlfriend who appears in season 2's "Jackal Onassis Backstage Party" and "Precious Lights Pre-School Auction".
- Michael Hitchcock as Bolus Lugozshe, the new owner of Party Down, appearing in season 2's "Party Down Company Picnic" and "Constance Carmell Wedding".
- June Diane Raphael as Danielle Lugozshe, daughter of Bolus who begins an affair with Ron and eventually chooses him over her fiancé. She appears in season 2's "Party Down Company Picnic" and "Constance Carmell Wedding".
- James Marsden as Jack Botty (season 3), a successful actor and boyfriend of Evie.

Party Down featured several cameos and guest appearances, including Kevin Hart, Steve Guttenberg, Breckin Meyer, Rick Fox, and George Takei.

== Development ==
=== Conception ===
The concept of Party Down was six years in the making, with many of the ideas for the episodes conceptualized years before the show was made. An original unaired pilot was shot at Rob Thomas's house with all the original cast except Lizzy Caplan, whose character was played by Andrea Savage. Paul Rudd was also in the pilot, but could not participate in the series due to film projects. The pilot was used to sell the show to the Starz network.

=== Crew ===
The series was executive produced by co-creators John Enbom, Rob Thomas, Dan Etheridge and Paul Rudd. Enbom served as showrunner. The co-executive producers were Jennifer Gwartz and Danielle Stokdyk and Jennifer Dugan was a producer. Beginning with season two, series star Adam Scott served as a producer, while series directors Bryan Gordon and Fred Savage served as supervising producers. Series star Ken Marino directed the second-season finale episode.

=== Possible film adaptation ===
On January 8, 2012, Megan Mullally stated a film was being written by John Enbom and she would be part of it. According to Mullally, the film would likely pick up where season two left off.

In a January 2012 interview, Martin Starr commented that "I know that things have gone out that make it seem like it’s official, but there’s nothing official. We all have our fingers crossed and hope that everything works out and that we can get it made. There are small steps being taken that hopefully will lead to people signing contracts and us getting to do something, but at the moment I’m not capable of saying that it’s happening yet". Starr continued that, although he had "heard of the possibility of financiers", he was not sure "to what degree things are moving forward, or if things are moving forward". He then joked "Hopefully those talks lead to us getting to make an amazing movie that all seven of us fans can watch". In December 2015, Adam Scott said the film is unlikely to ever happen, and if anything were to happen it would most likely be new episodes.

=== Revival ===
In March 2021, it was reported that a revival as a six-episode limited series was in development at Starz. The originals series creators Enbom, Thomas, Etheridge, and Rudd became involved and Enbom served as showrunner. In November 2021, Starz officially ordered a six-episode series with Adam Scott, Jane Lynch, Ken Marino, Martin Starr, Ryan Hansen and Megan Mullally to return; Lizzy Caplan was reported not to return due to scheduling conflicts. Jennifer Garner, Tyrel Jackson Williams, and Zoë Chao were cast as series regulars, while James Marsden was cast in a recurring role. Ultimately, Caplan appeared in a cameo in the season finale, as her appearance was always meant to be a surprise. The series began production in January 2022 and filming wrapped in March 2022. The third season premiered on February 24, 2023.

== Episodes ==
Season	Episodes	Originally released	
Season	Episodes	First released	Last released
1	10	March 20, 2009	May 22, 2009
2	10	April 23, 2010	June 25, 2010
3	6	February 24, 2023	March 31, 2023

=== Season 1 (2009) ===
No. overall	No. in season	Title	Directed by	Written by	Original release date
1	1	"Willow Canyon Homeowners Annual Party"	Fred Savage	John Enbom & Dan Etheridge & Paul Rudd & Rob Thomas	March 20, 2009
Failed actor Henry Pollard (Adam Scott) returns to the Party Down catering company led by Ron Donald (Ken Marino). The team cater a suburban homeowners' annual party hosted by Gordon (Enrico Colantoni) and Liddy McSpadden (Rebecca Creskoff) where Henry's co-workers and guests recognize him from a well-known beer commercial with the catchphrase "Are we having fun yet?". Casey Klein (Lizzy Caplan) has problems with her husband over her job. Roman (Martin Starr) tricks Kyle (Ryan Hansen) into thinking he's got an offer for a film.
2	2	"California College Conservative Union Caucus"	Fred Savage	Teleplay by : John Enbom; Story by : Rob Thomas & John Enbom	March 27, 2009
While catering a college conservative event, the Party Down crew are given advice by the students. Casey wonders if she should move to Vermont with her husband to pursue being a comedian. Ron is tasked with preparing a gift for Governor Arnold Schwarzenegger who's scheduled to attend. Roman is able to slip in his film script as a part of the gift for the Governor.
3	3	"Pepper McMasters Singles Seminar"	Bryan Gordon	John Enbom	April 3, 2009
The crew cater a seniors' singles mixer hosted by Pepper McMasters (Marilu Henner). Constance (Jane Lynch) runs into an ex-lover (Ed Begley, Jr.) at the mixer, and ends up reminiscing about old times with him while smoking pot along with Henry. Casey is given an ultimatum by her husband, and after a few drinks she texts him that she wants a divorce. Shortly after, Casey and Henry begin to make out and eventually have sex. An elderly man collapses and is revived by Constance.
4	4	"Investors Dinner"	Bryan Gordon	Teleplay by : Rob Thomas; Story by : Rob Thomas & Dan Etheridge	April 10, 2009
Tony Carolla (Daran Norris), a land tycoon hosts a party for possible investors for a Mexican condo project. While catering the event, Henry and Casey discuss what their status is, and agree to a casual relationship. Kyle makes a friend (Ryan Devlin) at the party, hoping to become successful like him—but ends up ditching plans for an after party with him after how he talks about Constance, and decides to hang out with her instead. Henry comes to the conclusion Carolla is scamming the investors after realizing none of the phones work, the rest of the house is empty, and recognizes a man from his acting class. After Ron writes a check of his life savings to Carolla to invest, Henry exposes that it is a scam, and Carolla pulls out a gun. Ron, thinking it is the prop gun Roman brought, stands up to Carolla and demands he be given his money back. After realizing he is holding a real gun, he drops to the floor and Carolla is able to flee.
5	5	"Sin Say Shun Awards Afterparty"	Fred Savage	Teleplay by : John Enbom; Story by : John Enbom & Dan Etheridge	April 17, 2009
While catering an adult entertainment awards afterparty, Ron gets an offer from a producer (Mather Zickel) to star in a porn film, to get paid enough money to be able to start up his "Soup 'R Crackers" franchise. Kyle tries to teach Roman how to play it cool around the porn stars, but to no such luck. After Casey takes ecstasy, she wants Henry to as well. Once Henry is able to get some, Casey comes off her high and suffers the after effects and decides to go home, leaving Henry alone feeling the effects of the drug. Stormy Daniels guest stars as winner of the "Best blow job" award.
6	6	"Taylor Stiltskin Sweet Sixteen"	Bryan Gordon	John Enbom	April 24, 2009
Film producer Leonard Stiltskin (J. K. Simmons) throws his daughter Taylor (Allison Scagliotti) a sweet sixteen birthday party, though none of the popular kids show up. Ron gets advice about his "Soup 'R Crackers" franchise from the rappers (Kevin Hart, Fatso-Fasano) scheduled to perform at the party. An old friend (Breckin Meyer) of Henry's shows up at the party and tries to get him in the film he's doing with Leonard Stiltskin. Leonard's wife Diandra (Joey Lauren Adams) hits on Kyle and offers him the part in the film Henry is vying for, but Kyle loses the offer after he seems uninterested in her as he got his teeth bleached, causing him pain when they're trying to make out.
7	7	"Brandix Corporate Retreat"	Fred Savage	Teleplay by : John Enbom; Story by : John Enbom & Dan Etheridge	May 1, 2009
The crew cater a corporate retreat for Brandix, an office management supplier. Former NBA player Rick Fox is a guest speaker at the event, and hits it off with Casey, making both Henry and Roman jealous. Ron hosts a team building meeting in which Henry and Casey's relationship is exposed. Henry confesses to Casey that he truly has feelings for her even though they agreed to a casual relationship. Henry takes up an offer from Gary (Rob Corddry), a Brandix employee and goes in for an interview. At the interview, Henry finds out the job is a telemarketer position and realizes he's stuck in a dead end job.
8	8	"Celebrate Ricky Sargulesh"	Bryan Gordon	John Enbom	May 8, 2009
The crew cater a party thrown for Ricky Sargulesh (Steven Weber), though unsure what it is actually for. Roman later finds out that it's in celebration of Ricky being acquitted of murder. Henry, Casey, Constance, and Kyle are all treated like stars after the guests recognize them as actors, leaving Ron to do all the work. Ricky proposes to his girlfriend Ula (Maria Zyrianova). Ricky gives Roman his screenplay for critique, and after reading it, Roman believes the plot of the film is actually a confession of how Ricky murdered someone.
9	9	"James Rolf High School Twentieth Reunion"	Fred Savage	Teleplay by : Russell Smith; Story by : John Enbom & Dan Etheridge	May 15, 2009
Ron decides to cater his own high school 20th reunion, hoping to impress his former classmates—especially the event organizer Melinda (Molly Parker)—that he's a team leader and that he's not like how he was in high school. Constance's roommate Bobbie St. Brown (Jennifer Coolidge) takes over her position in the Party Down team. Henry thinks of moving back home with his parents, but Casey is able to convince him to stay as they rethink their relationship. Ron tries to ignore his former best friend from high school (Joe Lo Truglio), to try sell his new image to Melinda. After Ron interrupts Melinda and Mark Defino (Kyle Bornheimer) in an intimate situation, he slips back into his old ways by trying to drink an entire bottle of whiskey like he previously did in high school, and subsequently vomits while trying to get someone to call an ambulance.
10	10	"Stennheiser-Pong Wedding Reception"	Bryan Gordon	John Enbom	May 22, 2009
The crew cater a gay wedding reception, though Valhalla Catering shows up, led by Uda Bengt (Kristen Bell), and take over. Uda instructs the Party Down team to organize the food on different colored trays due to some of guests being allergic to some of the foods. Ron begins to fall apart, leaving Henry to take charge. Roman is tasked by Uda to point to a sign that points guests to the restroom. When a member of the Valhalla Catering team is injured, Kyle takes his position, and tries talking to Mr. Stennheiser, who is a film producer. After saying he'll do anything, he gets an offer from another producer to star in a film about BASE jumping. Roman meets George Takei and asks him questions about Star Trek and Mr. Takei accidentally eats food from a wrong colored tray, a mistake by the Party Down team. Casey tells Henry that she's taking a job as a comedian on a cruise ship for six months and believes he should be with someone better. Alan Duk (Ken Jeong) shows up and tells Ron he'll purchase one of his "Soup 'R Crackers" which Ron will run. Mr. Duk then offers Henry the team leader position, which he accepts. At the end of the night, Uda asks Henry out.

=== Season 2 (2010) ===
No. overall	No. in season	Title	Directed by	Written by	Original release date	U.S. viewers (millions)
11	1	"Jackal Onassis Backstage Party"	Bryan Gordon	Teleplay by : John Enbom; Story by : John Enbom & Rob Thomas & Dan Etheridge	April 23, 2010	0.126
The crew cater a backstage party for rock star Jackal Onassis (Jimmi Simpson). Casey returns to the team after Henry fires an employee (Danny Woodburn) for being late and drinking on the job. Jackal Onassis switches place with Roman, acting as a bartender named "Dennis", so he could feel like a real person, after admitting everything in his life is fake. Even though Roman is dressed in Jackal Onassis' wardrobe and people think he is him, he still has no luck with the women there. New member of the team Lydia (Megan Mullally) tries to help Casey in dealing with the awkwardness of being back on the team and around Henry. Henry learns that Casey is dating someone and she finds out he is dating Uda. Ron comes to the backstage party with his new girlfriend Mandy (Aviva), who is a big Jackal Onassis fan. After Ron finds out Roman (dressed as Jackal) signed his girlfriend's breasts, he attacks him, causing security to taser Ron. Henry then gets in trouble when security finds out Ron and Mandy were allowed in uninvited. "Dennis" then takes the blame, letting Henry fire him. Ron asks Henry if he can get Alan Duk to give him his job back after it is revealed his "Soup 'R Crackers" franchise failed.
12	2	"Precious Lights Pre-School Auction"	Fred Savage	Teleplay by : Rob Thomas; Story by : John Enbom & Rob Thomas & Dan Etheridge	April 30, 2010	0.289
Ron returns to the Party Down team, though working for Henry, who is still the team leader. Ron begins acting like Henry did when he was leader, causing problems for Henry. At the auction event, Casey helps out the chairwoman Annie LeGros (Andrea Savage), who has to raise $250,000 so her son will get a recommendation letter for the pre-school, when she learns she used to be an actor. Leonard (J. K. Simmons) and Diandra Stiltskin (Joey Lauren Adams) appear at the auction, with their prize being meeting Tom Hanks, though Leonard tells his wife he is actually unable to get Hanks, meaning he'll have to outbid anyone for it. When time is running out for the auction and they still have not raised enough money, Casey tells Annie to bid on the Tom Hanks prize, causing Leonard to bid another $20,000, which brings the total to $250,000. Casey gets good news when she learns she got a small part in a Judd Apatow film, believing it will be her big break. Leonard finds out Henry told people about his prize, which cost him more money, and then promises Henry he'll never work again as an actor.
13	3	"Nick DiCintio's Orgy Night"	Bryan Gordon	Teleplay by : John Enbom; Story by : John Enbom & Rob Thomas & Dan Etheridge	May 7, 2010	0.113
The crew cater an orgy party hosted by Nick DiCintio (Thomas Lennon), though none of the guests knew it was going to be an orgy party. Ron tries to deal with his break-up with his girlfriend Mandy, while Henry deals with problems with his girlfriend Uda. When the party is not going the way Nick wants, he asks Roman for tips to help set the mood to get the orgy going. Kyle's film about base jumping goes straight to DVD and is crushed when one of the women working the party tells him he'll never make it in Hollywood, and seeks reassurance from Roman. Lydia is interested in Nick, but he never shows any interest back. Finally, at the end of the night, people start to loosen up, but Nick tells the Party Down team no actual orgy happened.
14	4	"James Ellison Funeral"	Fred Savage	Teleplay by : John Enbom; Story by : John Enbom & Dan Etheridge	May 14, 2010	0.159
When catering a funeral reception, Ron begins to think about death and if his life has any meaning. Kyle asks one of the guests to teach him about blues from who he thinks is an actual bluesman, though it ends up being a joke, but he still thinks it was about learning the blues. When the mistress (Arden Myrin) of the deceased shows up to the reception, Henry tries to keep her away from the widow (Loretta Devine).
15	5	"Steve Guttenberg's Birthday"	Bryan Gordon	Teleplay by : John Enbom; Story by : John Enbom & Dan Etheridge	May 21, 2010	0.187
The crew are set to cater a birthday party for actor Steve Guttenberg at his house, but when he shows up, he tells them his friends already threw him a surprise party the previous night. He ends up inviting the Party Down crew in his house for a party and tells them to invite any friends. Ron returns as an improved man after entering into AA. Kyle invites Colette, a girl from his acting class, hoping to hook up with her. Roman invites his writing partner Kent (Christopher Mintz-Plasse), where they are working on a script. Guttenberg suggests that they act out their screenplay, to get a better perspective on the material. After finishing a scene, everyone suggests it needs more emotion, leading Kent and Roman to rewrite it, much to Roman's dismay. When reacting out the scene, it leads to Henry and Casey kissing. Later when both in the jacuzzi, Casey kisses him again, but Henry holds back, because he has a girlfriend. Casey then leaves. At the end of party, everyone leaves, although Colette stays behind with Steve Guttenberg, leaving Kyle behind on the way out the door.
16	6	"Not On Your Wife Opening Night"	David Wain	Teleplay by : John Enbom; Story by : John Enbom & Dan Etheridge	May 28, 2010	0.087
The crew cater a community theater after party, where Kyle promises to help his old mentor (Jim Piddock), by seducing a wealthy female patron (Rachael Harris), in hoping she'll donate enough money to save the theater. Roman is treated like a king by two of the stage actors (Rob Huebel and Kerri Kenney-Silver) after he tells them he is a writer. Ron misreads Lydia thinking she is interested in him, leading to an awkward encounter where he kisses her. Casey continues to pursue Henry, which leads to them kissing again. The night is filled with plenty of miscommunications leading to several secrets being exposed.
17	7	"Party Down Company Picnic"	Bryan Gordon	Teleplay by : John Enbom; Story by : John Enbom & Dan Etheridge	June 4, 2010	0.068
Valhalla Catering caters the Party Down company picnic, leading to competition between the two staffs to see who are the better caterers. Ron competes for the Operations Manager position at the main office by trying to impress the new owner, Bolus Lugozshe (Michael Hitchcock). Kyle teaches Lydia's daughter, Escapade (Kaitlyn Dever), the ways of Hollywood. Ron hits it off with Bolus Lugozshe's daughter, Danielle (June Diane Raphael), who helps try him get the new job. Henry plans on breaking up with Uda (Kristen Bell), who is catering the event and tells Henry she was offered the Operations Manager position and could get him a job in the main office, securing them both with good jobs. Though Uda eventually tells Henry she feels the same way about their relationship, leading to a mutual break up. Henry then decides to step down as team leader, offering the position back to Ron. And Ron finds out Danielle is actually engaged.
18	8	"Joel Munt's Big Deal Party"	Fred Savage	Teleplay by : John Enbom; Story by : John Enbom & Dan Etheridge	June 11, 2010	N/A
Roman finds out they are catering a party for his old writing partner, Joel Munt (Paul Scheer), who hired Party Down just to rub his success in Roman's face. Roman finds out he sold his spec script for an adaption of a science fiction novel written by AF Gordon Theodore (Dave (Gruber) Allen). Now that Ron is back in charge, Henry goes back to his old ways by fooling around with Casey, now that they are back together. Kyle is excited to cater the party as plenty of producers are present, trying his best to get auditions. Lydia mistakenly sniffs cocaine after given some in the bathroom and talks to Scott (Andre Royo), a film producer about ideas for his upcoming film. Roman spends the night trying to get revenge on Munt believing he is a sell-out, and succeeds when he is able to convince the author he will not stay true to the novel. Munt eventually apologizes to Roman for his actions and they begin thinking how to translate an unseen character from the novel to the screen while staying true to the novel. Though Munt ends up stealing Roman's idea which gets him back on board with the author.
19	9	"Cole Landry's Draft Day Party"	Fred Savage	Teleplay by : Rob Thomas; Story by : Rob Thomas & Dan Etheridge	June 18, 2010	0.109
The crew cater a party for college quarterback Cole Landry (Aaron Hill) who is expected to be drafted by the NFL and the party will be broadcast on television. Ron tells Henry of a personal health concern, which Kyle overhears. Ron also wants everyone to not use their cellphones because complaints they've been receiving. Kyle gets news that if he can leave early, his band will be able play a gig, but Ron denies his request. Kyle then plays a prank on Ron by using the information he heard earlier by getting one of the guests (Daniel Franzese) who is pre-med to inform Ron he might have prostate cancer. Henry gets advice from Jerome, one of the football players, who thinks he is being treated unfairly by Casey. When Landry does not get drafted due to rumors of him being gay, Casey poses as his girlfriend for television. The rumor is confirmed on television when a photo is shown of him kissing another man, which Jerome sees who then confronts Cole about it live on television—with Casey in the middle of it.
20	10	"Constance Carmell Wedding"	Ken Marino	Teleplay by : John Enbom; Story by : John Enbom & Dan Etheridge	June 25, 2010	0.074
Constance (Jane Lynch) reunites with the Party Down catering crew when she hires them to cater her wedding to Howard Greengold (Alex Rocco), a former film producer. Casey and the others are worried about her decision as Howard has been married nine times and cheated on them and that Constance may only be marrying him because he is thinking of getting back into the film business. Kyle is confused about a script for a film he is auditioning for, so he gives it to Henry so he can explain it to him. Bolus Lugozshe and his daughter Danielle along with her fiancé Stuart (John Ross Bowie) attend the wedding, where Danielle tells Ron she thinks they should end their affair because if her father finds out, Ron might get fired. Roman accidentally eats food with marijuana in it and comes up with an idea for what he thinks is his best script yet. Howard's daughter Mona (Jennifer Irwin) makes Constance sign a prenuptial agreement. Kyle and his band Karma Rocket perform at the wedding, though the song's lyrics ("My Struggle") accidentally make references to Nazi propaganda and the Holocaust. After taking advice from Constance, Ron confesses his love to Danielle—in front of everyone, including her fiancé–and ends up getting punched by Stuart. Danielle ends up choosing Ron over her fiancé, and finds out her parents are getting a divorce—giving ownership of Party Down to her mother. Lydia then gets together with Bolus. Casey learns that her scene from the Judd Apatow film got cut out, and Henry tries to comfort her. When Constance and Howard leave the ceremony, he dies in the car—but Constance is thankful for every day she was with him and it is revealed he did not sign the prenuptial papers. The following day, Henry does not show up to work and instead goes in for the audition for the script he read.

=== Season 3 (2023) ===
No. overall	No. in season	Title	Directed by	Written by	Original release date
21	1	"Kyle Bradway is Nitromancer"	Bryan Gordon	John Enbom	February 24, 2023
The Party Down team, still led by Ron, is catering an event for Kyle, who is celebrating being cast in the superhero role of "Nitromancer". Roman is still working for Party Down and bitter about Kyle's success. Former Party Down employees Henry, Constance and Lydia attend the event. Lydia is a successful manager for her actress daughter; Constance is still an actor, as well as a playwright, and now widow and heiress; and Henry is a high school English teacher and married with children. Ron reveals to Henry he will be taking over as owner of the company. A news story about Casey causes Roman to mention her success as an actor and that she "made it big" from her role on Saturday Night Live. Kyle runs into controversy when a 10-year-old video of his band Karma Rocket performing "My Struggle" surfaces online, which accuses Kyle of being a Nazi because of the lyrics being misconstrued. Henry meets Evie, a film producer who is attending the event with her actor boyfriend Jack Botty (James Marsden). Ron runs into financial trouble and is $10,000 short of his bid for the company, but is helped by Constance. New Party Down employee Sackson helps Kyle craft an apology video. However, due to the controversy, Kyle loses the role and learns the guitarist (Fran Kranz) for Karma Rocket leaked the video because Kyle's success led to the downfall of the band. Ron is excited about the future of the company but news breaks about a coronavirus outbreak. Fourteen months later, Ron, who is living in the Party Down van, gets a call about a possible booking.
22	2	"Jack Botty's Delayed Post-Pandemic Surprise Party"	Heather Jack	John Enbom	March 3, 2023
Party Down caters a surprise 45th birthday party for Jack Botty. Henry has finalized his divorced from his wife and to help pay the alimony, he has taken a second job working for Party Down again. Kyle is also back at Party Down after losing the role of "Nitromancer". Ron introduces their new chef, Lucy, a food artist, who is more interested in the food evoking emotion than tasting good. Constance, now an investor in Party Down, video chats with the team. The team learn Jack Botty is cheating on his girlfriend Evie when he arrives to the party early with a different woman named Tandy and tells them to keep it a secret. Lydia questions the psychological consequences of being a child actor regarding her daughter Escapade and worries she will be fired. Ron breaks his own rules by taking a shower in the clients home after Henry tells him he smells bad; Ron tells Henry he lost his sense of smell after getting COVID four times. Evie learns from Henry that Jack is cheating. When Ron is talking with Jack, he recognizes the smell of his soap, so Ron re-showers with his own soap. During karaoke, Tandy reveals to everyone about her relationship with Jack. Ron loses his chance at working with Jack after he knows Ron used his shower. Lydia gives Ron an event form for an upcoming party: a prom for her daughter. After casually flirting with each other during the party, Evie gives Henry her number.
23	3	"First Annual PI2A Symposium"	Jude Weng	John Enbom	March 10, 2023
Party Down caters an event for white supremacists, unbeknownst to the group at first, because Ron needs the money. The rest of the team expresses their displeasure about working the event. The symposium is led by a man named Stuart (Calum Worthy) and their main money donor is Dermott (Nick Offerman). A protest group forms outside the event, which Kyle eventually joins. Kyle gets help from Henry as Kyle has an upcoming audition for an Othello adaptation. Dermott compliments Lucy regarding her food, but she feels conflicted with the appreciation. Sackson reveals to Roman that the main demographic of his blog are white supremacist-affiliated groups. Henry and Evie establish a more serious relationship. It's revealed that the protestors are actually part of the white supremacists group in an attempt to create publicity. Stuart tells Ron he won't be able to pay for the event until next month, but Henry puts on a sympathetic acting performance, which leads Stuart to have Dermott pay the invoice.
24	4	"KSGY-95 Prizewinner's Luau"	Ken Marino	Dayo Adesokan	March 17, 2023
The team cater a luau for contest winners for a Sting concert. Evie hangs out with the team during the event and brings psilocybin mushrooms, which they all decide to take except Ron who is unaware. Kyle is depressed because he has not received any callbacks for his auditions. Sackson live streams his drug trip. Roman is suspicious something weird is going on at the event and is pulled away into a tent and it's revealed that the event hosts are actually cops. Lieutenant Sacker (Judy Reyes) reveals the event is actually a sting operation for deadbeat parents with outstanding child support payments who will be going to jail. While high, Roman gets inspiration to complete his science fiction screenplay. Kyle gets good news and gets a callback for The Lost Boys adaptation. Evie tells Henry he should seriously get back into acting.
25	5	"Once Upon a Time Proms Away Prom-otional Event"	Viet Nguyen	John Enbom	March 24, 2023
The team caters a prom for Lydia's daughter Escapade (Liv Hewson) which is also a press event for her upcoming film, Proms Away. Ron is nervous to impress a powerful PR agent, Sloan, who is attending the event. Constance shows up in person to support Ron. Roman connects with a fellow sci-fi fan named Steph at the event and begins to feel romantic feels for her, but he soon learns she has a boyfriend. However, Steph is a development executive and Roman gets a development deal for his sci-fi idea. Lydia is worried another talent manager, Ted Fine (Seth Morris), is going to steal Escapade as a client, so Lydia has Sackson spill wine on him, forcing him to leave. However, Escapade reveals to Lydia that she invited Ted as a blind date for her mother. Kyle tries to prove he is still young by having a dance-off with Sackson, but later feels the effects with a sore back. Ron gets food poisoning from eating bad shellfish, so Constance is tasked with impressing Sloan. Constance is successful and gets Sloan's business card. Evie gets a promotion at work and offers a role to Henry for a film franchise shooting in Tunisia. Lydia fires her daughter as a client because she just wants to be her mom.
26	6	"Sepulveda Basin High School Spring Play Opening Night"	Wendey Stanzler	Teleplay by : John Enbom & Rob Thomas; Story by : John Enbom	March 31, 2023
Henry's high school theater class perform a production of 'Tis Pity She's a Whore. Evie surprises them with an afterparty hosted by Party Down. The streaming service Roman sold his screenplay to goes bankrupt and Kyle gets the role in the Lost Boys reboot. Sackson pivots his content creation after one of his videos where he faceplants on an escalator during his dance-off with Kyle goes viral and Lucy has an audition for an upscale restaurant for celebrities. Ron learns from his lawyer that Constance actually owns the majority stake in the company because the forms were filled out wrong. The school's vice principal, Marty Mittman (Dan Bakkedahl), shuts down the party on school grounds due to them not having any permits. The team then secretly move the party into the library. Kyle discovers he was actually cast in the father role in the reboot, while Roman thinks of new ideas for his next screenplay. Marty finds the new party and instead joins them after wanting the students to like him. However, the principal (Jean Villepique) shows up and disciplines Henry and Marty. Henry reveals to Evie that he does not want to go to Tunisia for the acting gig and instead wants to stay. Four months later at a press junket the company is catering, Henry runs into Casey (Lizzy Caplan) where they catch up, and Casey tells Henry about how she's unhappy with her fame.

== Reception ==
The first season of Party Down holds an 86% approval rating with an average score of 8.5 out of 10 on Rotten Tomatoes based on 29 critical reviews. The website's critical consensus is, "Before shows about struggling actors were done to death, there was Party Down." On Metacritic, it has a score of 66 based on 12 reviews, indicating "generally favorable reviews". Andrew Wallenstein of The Hollywood Reporter said, "Lurking behind the surface of this raucous comedy is an astute meditation on the promise and peril of leading an unconventional life, something about which aspiring actors know a thing or two." The American Film Institute named Party Down one of the 10 best shows of 2009.

The second season holds a 100% rating with an average score of 8.9 out of 10 on Rotten Tomatoes based on 13 reviews. The website's critical consensus is, "Party Down's second season further entrenches the show's status as an astute and acidic comedy gem." On Metacritic, it has a score of 84 based on 12 reviews, indicating "universal acclaim". James Poniewozik of Time ranked Party Down as the sixth best television series of 2010. The show was nominated at the 26th TCA Awards for Outstanding Achievement in Comedy.

In 2014, Entertainment Weekly listed the show at #22 in their list of the "26 Best Cult TV Shows Ever" calling it a "smart, drily funny series" and saying, "But the off-beat writing shone brightest in the smaller moments, when the gang was just sitting around a kitchen and bickering to pass the time." In 2020, Briana Kranich of Screen Rant ranked Party Down as the second-most underrated TV show of the 2000s. In 2022, Alan Sepinwall of Rolling Stones ranked it #82 on his list of the 100 greatest TV shows of all time.

The third season holds a 95% rating with an average score of 8 out of 10 on Rotten Tomatoes based on 44 reviews. The website's critical consensus is, "Returning after a long layoff, Party Down brings patient fans a third season that's every bit as sharp – and laugh-out-loud funny – as its predecessors." On Metacritic, it has a score of 81 based on 27 reviews, indicating "universal acclaim".
