= Movin' Too Fast (film) =

2006 film by Eric Chambers

- Poster
- Directed by: Eric Chambers
- Written by: Eric Chambers
- Produced by: Steve Carter; Eric Chambers; Kerry Rossall
- Starring: Layla Alexander; Marquita Terry; Matthew Glave; Jack Kehler; Eric Michael Cole; Sal Lopez; Sonya Eddy; Christopher Jones; Jonathan Quint; Billy Maddox; Steve Kanaly; Réal Andrews; Derrick Simmons
- Cinematography: Fred V. Murphy
- Edited by: John Trunk
- Music by: Rick Cox; Jesse Voccia
- Production company: CRW Entertainment
- Distributed by: MTI Home Video
- Release date: August 15, 2006 (Denmark)
- Running time: 93 minutes
- Country: United States
- Language: English

Movin' Too Fast, also known as Lost in Plainview, is a 2006 action thriller film written and directed by Eric Chambers in his feature film debut. The film stars Layla Alexander, Marquita Terry, Matthew Glave, Jack Kehler and Eric Michael Cole.

== Plot ==
While carpooling through the California desert, two women are stopped by a police car in the middle of nowhere. The officer turns out to be a psychopath and stalks them in a game of cat and mouse.

== Cast ==
- Layla Alexander
- Marquita Terry
- Matthew Glave
- Jack Kehler
- Eric Michael Cole
- Sal Lopez
- Sonya Eddy
- Christopher Jones
- Jonathan Quint
- Billy Maddox
- Steve Kanaly
- Réal Andrews
- Derrick Simmons

== Production ==
The film's budget allowed for the destruction of multiple automobiles.

== Release ==
The movie was initially set to release in 2005 as Lost in Plainview.

== Reception ==
Matt Miller at Home Media Magazine favored the film. Jim McLennan at Girls With Guns said it is like Thelma and Louise, The Hitcher and Wolf Creek. Jon Condit at Dread Central scored the film 1 out of 5.
