= Dahmer (film) =

2002 film by David Jacobson

- Film poster
- Directed by: David Jacobson
- Written by: David Jacobson; David Birke
- Produced by: Larry Rattner
- Starring: Jeremy Renner; Artel Great; Matt Newton; Dion Basco; Bruce Davison
- Cinematography: Chris Manley
- Edited by: Bipasha Shom
- Music by: Christina Agamanolis; Mariana Bernoski; Willow Williamson
- Production companies: Blockbuster Films; DEJ Productions; Peninsula Films; Two Left Shoes Films
- Distributed by: Peninsula Films
- Release date: June 21, 2002 (Los Angeles)
- Running time: 102 minutes
- Country: United States
- Language: English
- Budget: $250,000
- Box office: $148,235

Dahmer is a 2002 American horror drama film written and directed by David Jacobson, and co-written by David Birke. A limited theatrical release, it is based on the crimes of Jeffrey Dahmer, a serial killer, who killed seventeen young men and boys in Bath, Ohio and Milwaukee, Wisconsin, between 1978 and 1991. It stars Jeremy Renner as Dahmer, and co-stars Artel Great, Matt Newton, Dion Basco and Bruce Davison.

== Plot ==
Jeffrey Dahmer lures attractive young men home, where he conducts experiments on and kills them, trying to create a living zombie who will never leave or judge him.

Flashbacks to Dahmer's past reveal that he killed his first victim, a hitchhiker whom he picked up in his hometown of Bath, Ohio, when he was a teenager. The flashbacks also reveal his strained relationship with his father, Lionel, and Dahmer's alcoholism. In the present, Dahmer rationalizes his crimes, which include rape and necrophilia, in Milwaukee over the divorce of his parents and his emotionally isolated childhood.

At a knife shop, Dahmer meets a charismatic young gay Black man named Rodney and invites him home, intending to murder him, but as the night goes on and the conversations get more personal, Dahmer is faced with an emotional crisis; Rodney confesses his romantic feelings for Dahmer, but finds him evasive. During the course of their evening together, Dahmer nearly strangles Rodney with a belt, but Rodney escapes from the apartment.

The film ends with a flashback to Dahmer as a teenager, attending a therapy session at his father's urging. Before dropping him off, Lionel tells his son that he is always there to listen. When Dahmer arrives at the therapist's office, however, he turns away from the door and walks off into the woods. An intertitle then explains that Dahmer was found guilty of killing at least 15 men, and was killed in prison by another inmate in 1994 after serving two years of his life sentence.

== Cast ==
- Jeremy Renner as Jeffrey Dahmer
- Bruce Davison as Lionel Dahmer
- Artel Great as Rodney (based on Tracey Edwards)
- Matt Newton as Lance Bell (based on Stephen Hicks)
- Dion Basco as Khamtay (based on Konerak Sinthasomphone)
- Kate Williamson as Grandma Dahmer
- Christina Payano as Letitia
- Tom'ya Bowden as Shawna
- Sean Blakemore as Corliss
- Mickey Swenson as Officer Phillips
- Julius Branca as Officer Powell
- Pierson Blaetz as Officer Martin
- Lily Knight as Mrs. Dahmer

== Production ==
Writer and director David Jacobson was inspired to create the film after hearing an interview with Jeffrey Dahmer's father, Lionel, on NPR, and after reading an article which stated, "Dahmer claimed he killed those guys because he was too afraid to lose them." The film was heavily based on both Court TV's coverage of Dahmer's trial and A Father's Story, a book written by Dahmer's father, Lionel. Multiple producers were contacted by Jacobson in hopes that they would collaborate on the film, but many of them were disgusted by the explicit content, with the director stating that he had "sent out a 4-page statement on how he truly felt about the film, and what it was about." Jacobson managed to make Dahmer in 18 days.

The film was promoted using the longer title Dahmer: The Mind is a Place of its Own, but it was shortened to Dahmer in most cases.

== Release ==
Dahmer was given a limited theatrical release by Peninsula Films on June 21, 2002. On its opening weekend, it played in two theaters, and grossed $16,093. By August 12, 2002, it had expanded to five theaters, and grossed $144,008. Internationally, it grossed $4,227.

A remastered version of the film was released on Blu-ray by MVD Entertainment Group on August 11, 2020.

== Reception ==
On the review aggregator website Rotten Tomatoes, 73% of 41 critics' reviews are positive, with an average rating of 6.50/10. Metacritic, which uses a weighted average, assigned the film a score of 63 out of 100, based on 18 critics, indicating "generally favorable" reviews.

Marc Savlov, in a review written for The Austin Chronicle, gave the "quiet nightmare" of a film a score of 3/5. The Christian Science Monitor gave the "intelligently directed drama" a score of 3/4. Owen Gleiberman of Entertainment Weekly gave the film a grade of B+ and wrote, "To explain a serial killer is to diminish his madness, but Dahmer does something quietly riveting. It lets you brush up against the humanity of a psycho, without making him any less psycho." David Noh of Film Journal International commended David Jacobson's visuals, Jeremy Renner and Bruce Davison's performances, and how the film managed to generate "nigh-unbearable tension" without showing "any actual gore."

Chuck Wilson listed the "haunting" film as the best 2002 release that he had reviewed for LA Weekly. Writing for The Oregonian, Shawn Levy called the film "remarkable" and Renner's performance as Dahmer "stunning" and concluded his review of Dahmer with, "It's a triumph of the film that it manages to make Jeffrey Dahmer a human being -- at least a member of the species -- without ever bending toward empathy with or excuses for him. A monster is a monster. This one just happened also to be a man."

Bob Strauss of the Seattle Post-Intelligencer also responded positively:

Dahmer is a thoughtfully considered, well-acted inquiry into what made the infamous, ghoulish serial killer Jeffrey Dahmer tick. And while it doesn't come up with very compelling answers to that question, it does so as non-exploitively as one could imagine a film about a guy who drugged, sexually abused, murdered and cannibalized 17 young men (most of them poor minorities) might.

Similarly, Robert Koehler of Variety wrote, "Rethinking the serial killer movie in every respect, David Jacobson presents a powerfully cool visualization of a gruesome life in Dahmer. By de-dramatizing the actions of Jeffrey Dahmer, America's most ghoulish mass murderer, and by refusing to serve up easy psychological motivations or any standard exploiter devices, Jacobson produces a remarkably creepy piece of cinema that disturbs by suggestion, nuance and ambiguity." Ed Halter of The Village Voice also praised the "powerfully unsettling" film, writing, "Jacobson has achieved the unthinkable: He humanizes a notoriously brutal psychopath and, in the process, leaves the audience with an unwelcome sense of complicity."

Michael Wilmington of the Chicago Tribune found that while the film was tasteful, intelligent, and well-acted, it was also too subdued and "stripped-down" in its approach to its salacious subject matter, shying away from depicting anything too revolting or potentially offensive and thus depriving the audience of "crucial knowledge necessary for anything more than a superficial understanding of Dahmer's pathology." Andy Klein of the Dallas Observer commended the film's performances and its lack of onscreen sensationalism, but also felt that its "often-deadpan style" failed to reach the heights of similar works like Henry: Portrait of a Serial Killer.

While Megan Turner of the New York Post found the film to be well-acted and occasionally disquieting, she also disparagingly noted that it was "superficial" and "without any real illumination of his [Dahmer's] psyche." Likewise, while Carla Meyer of the San Francisco Chronicle found the film to be occasionally suspenseful, with emotional weight, good performances, and respectful portrayals of Dahmer's victims, she further opined that it had a sensationalist atmosphere and did not delve deeply enough into Dahmer's psychology, ultimately concluding, "David Jacobson doesn't seem to know where to go with his version."

Kevin Thomas of the Los Angeles Times had a largely negative response to what he felt was a sluggish, contrived, and "glum" film, writing, "Jacobson is skilled with his small cast and mostly leaves to the imagination the outcome of a number of gruesome sequences. Ultimately, however, Dahmer suffers from a lack of clarity and audacity that a subject as monstrous and pathetic as Dahmer demands. Some bursts of energy and pitch-dark humor could have set off a more revealing portrait of this serial killer."

Moira Macdonald of The Seattle Times found that, aside from good performances, the film was little more than "a hellish, numbing experience" that "doesn't offer any insights that haven't been thoroughly debated in the media already, back in the Dahmer heyday of the mid-'90s." Similarly, while Maitland McDonagh of TV Guide found Dahmer to be both handsomely photographed and well-acted, she otherwise had a middling response to it, writing, "Ultimately, the film feels a little pointless; if it means only to remind us that every monster comes from somewhere, that's a well-worn observation."

At the 18th Independent Spirit Awards, Jeremy Renner and Artel Great were nominated for Best Male Lead and Best Newcomer, respectively, while David Jacobson was nominated for the John Cassavetes Award.

Kathryn Bigelow cast Jeremy Renner in The Hurt Locker because of his performance in Dahmer.

== See also ==
- The Secret Life: Jeffrey Dahmer, a 1993 film about Jeffrey Dahmer
- Raising Jeffrey Dahmer, a 2006 film about Jeffrey Dahmer
- My Friend Dahmer, a 2017 film about Jeffrey Dahmer
- Dahmer – Monster: The Jeffrey Dahmer Story, a 2022 limited series about Jeffrey Dahmer
