= Réal Andrews =

Canadian actor and film actor

- Born: Réal Johnson; January 31, 1963 (age 63); North Vancouver, British Columbia, Canada
- Occupation: Actor
- Years active: 1981–present
- Spouse: Michele Viscasso (m. 2000)
- Children: 3
- Website: realandrewsofficial.com

Réal Andrews (born Réal Johnson; January 31, 1963) is a Canadian actor of African-Caribbean heritage. He is known for playing Chance Walker in the first season of the syndicated action drama series Soldier of Fortune, Inc., and for playing Marcus Taggert on the ABC daytime soap opera General Hospital since 1996.

== Early life and education ==
Born Réal Johnson, Andrews was raised in Vancouver, British Columbia by a single mother. Andrews did not have a relationship with his biological father, a musician who abandoned Andrews and his mother when he was only a few years old. Andrews only met his birth father one time while in college. When Andrews was 21 years old, his mother Troy married Cyril Nathan Andrews, who adopted Reál as his own. Andrews was raised as a Catholic and attended an all boys private school. Growing up, Andrews wasn't interested in acting at all and described himself as a jock. Andrews was first exposed to acting when his aunt invited him to a seminar at her acting school. In 1981, the 18 year Andrews relocated to Toronto, Canada for college where found work in the entertainment industry.

== Career ==
Andrews started his career in 1981 as a stuntman, becoming one of the first Black stunt men in Canada. While he had a long list of credits, Andrews had been working as a struggling actor for years by the time he booked General Hospital in late 1996. Marcus Taggert which originally was an "under-five" role which would help launch Andrews career. From 1997 to 1999, Andrews would also star in the Dan Gordon created series, Soldier of Fortune, Inc.. He would leave the role of Taggert for a few months in 1997 only to return by year's end. In 2003, Andrews chose not to renew his contract with General Hospital and Taggert was written in May 2003. Andrews quickly joined the cast of CBS Daytime's As the World Turns as Walker Daniels in 2003. Only a year later, Andrews was let go from the series. In 2010, Andrews joined the cast of the web series, The Bay as Dr. Keith Campbell. In 2015, Andrews joined the cast of Days of Our Lives in a recurring role. In 2020, Andrews made an unannounced return to General Hospital as Taggert on January 17, 2020. In October 2024, he announced he had concluded his time at General Hospital and revealed he had a new, undisclosed project he was signed to.

== Personal life ==
On November 4, 2000, Andrews married Michele Viscasso. They have three children together.

== Filmography ==
=== Film ===
Year	Title	Role	Notes
1984	Iceman	Lab tech	
1984	Listen to the City	Green	
1986	Busted Up	Auditioning fighter	
1987	Wild Thing	Raul	
1987	Nowhere to Hide	Luther	
1987	City of Shadows	Thug in Diner	
1987	Last Man Standing	Razor	
1988	Night Friend	Myles	
1989	Food of the Gods II	Mark	
1989	Born on the Fourth of July	Vet #3	
1989	Renegades	Cop	
1994	Final Round	Carlos	Direct-to-video film
2006	Movin' Too Fast	Detective #2	

=== Television ===
Year	Title	Role	Notes
1984	The Glitter Dome	Cooley	Television film
1985	Night Heat	4 roles	4 episodes
1986	In This Corner	Fighter #2	Television film
1987	CBS Schoolbreak Special	Gordon	Episode: "The Day They Came to Arrest the Book"
1987	21 Jump Street	Drug dealer	Episode: "Besieged: Part 1"
1988	China Beach	Patient #3	Episode: "Waiting for Beckett"
1989	Street Legal	Wendell Walker	Episode: "Basketball Story"
1989	Friday the 13th: The Series	Deacon	Episode: "Night Hunger"
1989	Hard Time on Planet Earth	Deacon Powell	Episode: "All That You Can Be"
1989	C.B.C.'s Magic Hour	Tommy Mills	Episode: "The Fighter"
1989	E.N.G.	Roy	Episode: "Pilot: Parts 1 & Part 2"
1990	War of the Worlds	Man in Bar	Episode: "Synthetic Love"
1990	Counterstrike	Sandy	Episode: "Cinema Verite"
1992	Catwalk	Tyrone	Episode: "Life's Not Black 'n White"
1993	Counterstrike	Vince	Episode: "The Hit"
1993	Night Owl	Ivan	Television film
1995	Days of Our Lives	Robert Parry	Guest role
1996–2003, 2020–2023	General Hospital	Marcus Taggert	Series regular: 1996–2003; recurring role: 2020–2023
1998	Port Charles	Marcus Taggert	Recurring role
1997	Soldier of Fortune, Inc.	Chance Walker	Main role (season 1)
2003	As the World Turns	Walker Daniels	Recurring role
2005, 2009	Law & Order: Special Victims Unit	Sergeant Ray Crawford / Army Recruiter	Episodes: "Blood", "Turmoil"
2006	Law & Order	Deon	Episode: "Release"
2010	The Bay	Keith Campbell	Recurring role
2016–2017	Days of Our Lives	Hal Michaels	Recurring role: May 12, 2016 to March 9, 2017
