= Pie in the Sky (1995 film) =

- Theatrical release poster
- Directed by: Bryan Gordon
- Written by: Bryan Gordon
- Produced by: Allan Mindel
- Starring: Josh Charles; Anne Heche; Peter Riegert; Christine Ebersole; Christine Lahti; John Goodman
- Cinematography: Bernd Heinl
- Edited by: Colleen Halsey
- Music by: Michael Convertino
- Production company: Hollywood Road Films
- Distributed by: Fine Line Features
- Release dates: September 2, 1995 (Telluride Film Festival); February 9, 1996 (United States)
- Running time: 95 minutes
- Country: United States
- Language: English

Pie in the Sky is a 1995 American romantic comedy film about a young man obsessed with traffic gridlock who falls in love with an avant-garde dancer. The film was written and directed by Bryan Gordon, and stars Josh Charles, Anne Heche and John Goodman.

== Plot ==
A whimsical saga of a young man whose two life-consuming passions are unraveling traffic gridlock and an avant-garde dancer. A romantic comedy.

== Cast ==
- Josh Charles as Charlie Dunlap
- Jesse Stock as Charlie (age 10)
- A.J. Marton as Charlie (age 4)
- Anne Heche as Amy
- Alison Chalmers as Amy (age 10)
- Peter Riegert as Dad Dunlap
- Christine Ebersole as Mom Dunlap
- Wil Wheaton as Jack
- Brian Davila as Jack (age 10)
- Christine Lahti as Ruby
- John Goodman as Alan Davenport
- Bob Balaban as Paul
- Dey Young as Mrs. Tarnell
- Larry Holden as Amy's Boyfriend
- David Rasche as Amy's Dad
- William Newman as a Funeral Guest
- Alfred Dennis as Ruby's Dad
