= Career Opportunities (film) =

1991 film by Bryan Gordon

- Theatrical release poster
- Directed by: Bryan Gordon
- Written by: John Hughes
- Produced by: John Hughes; A. Hunt Lowry
- Starring: Frank Whaley; Jennifer Connelly; Dermot Mulroney
- Cinematography: Donald McAlpine
- Edited by: Glenn Farr; Peck Prior
- Music by: Thomas Newman
- Production company: Hughes Entertainment
- Distributed by: Universal Pictures (United States); Carolco Pictures (International)
- Release date: March 29, 1991
- Running time: 83 minutes
- Country: United States
- Language: English
- Box office: $11.3 million

Career Opportunities is a 1991 American romantic comedy film starring Frank Whaley in his first lead role and co-starring Jennifer Connelly. It was written and co-produced by John Hughes and directed by Bryan Gordon. In the film, Jim Dodge (Whaley) is a persuasive but irresponsible young man ("town liar") who lands a job as an overnight janitor at a local Target store. One evening after hours, he finds himself alone with the affluent but mistreated Josie McClellan (Connelly).

Hughes selected Gordon to direct his screenplay after being impressed by one of Gordon's short films. The film was mostly shot in a Target store outside Atlanta. The film grossed $11 million at the box office and received mostly negative reviews from critics. Hughes also disowned the film, calling it a disappointment.

== Plot ==
Twenty-one-year-old Jim Dodge, a dreamer and self-proclaimed "people person", is generally perceived as lazy and good-for-nothing. After being fired from numerous low-paying jobs, Jim is given the choice by his father to either land a job at the local Target or be sent to St. Louis to work for his uncle.

Jim is hired as a night cleaner at Target. On his first shift, Jim is locked alone in the store by his boss, the head custodian, until his shift ends at 7 am. He encounters beautiful Josie McClellan, a stereotypical 'spoiled rich girl' and former classmate he had known since childhood but never really connected with because of their different social backgrounds, despite once having a crush on her. Josie spent the past several hours asleep in a dressing room after backing out of shoplifting some merchandise in a half-hearted attempt to run away from her abusive father, Roger Roy McClellan.

Josie and Jim begin to connect, realizing they are not so different. They begin to form a romantic relationship, enjoying the freedom of having such a large store to themselves. Josie, who has $52,000 in her purse, persuades Jim to run away with her to Los Angeles as soon as they leave the store in the morning. Meanwhile, Roger teams up with the town sheriff to search for his runaway daughter.

Two incompetent crooks, Nestor Pyle and Gil Kinney, break in and hold the two hostage. Eventually, Josie seduces one of the crooks and convinces him to take her with them after robbing the store. While the criminals are loading stolen merchandise into their car, Josie jumps into the front seat and drives away, leaving the two men stranded in the parking lot. Meanwhile, Jim loads a shotgun found in the head custodian's locker, lures Nestor and Gil to the back of the store and holds them at gunpoint. In the morning, the sheriff arrives and stumbles upon the two crooks chained up by Jim. Jim and Josie run away and are then seen lounging next to a pool in Hollywood.

== Cast ==
- Frank Whaley as Jim Dodge
- Jennifer Connelly as Josie McClellan
- Dermot Mulroney as Nestor Pyle
- Kieran Mulroney as Gil Kinney
- John M. Jackson as Bud Dodge
- Jenny O'Hara as Dotty Dodge
- Noble Willingham as Roger Roy McClellan
- Barry Corbin as Officer Don
- Wilbur Fitzgerald as Bob Bosenbeck
- William Forsythe as Custodian
- John Candy as C.D. Marsh

== Production ==
It was the first film directed by Bryan Gordon. John Hughes approached him to direct after having been impressed by Gordon's short film, Ray's Male Heterosexual Dance Hall, which won the Academy Award for Best Live Short in 1987. Gordon said he took the job of Career Opportunities to "learn about myself and how to make a movie." Whaley, cast in the lead, said his character was "a little akin to Ferris Bueller."

After a nationwide search, the filmmakers chose the rural area of Monroe, Georgia, for the film's locale. The Target store #378 was located at 4000 Covington Highway in Decatur, just outside of Atlanta. The store had formerly been a Richway location, which was renovated after Target's Southeast expansion in the late 1980s. Whaley went to the location with the director before shooting and "looked for bits. So all those little montages, that was stuff that we came up with." He says he and Connelly "got along really well and, people remember certain shots from that movie." Target store #378 has since closed, and the building was eventually repurposed as a church.

Principal photography began on November 13, 1989, with an estimated seven-week filming schedule. It was shot over the Christmas holiday shopping season; a writer at the American Film Institute noted that "Some store employees remained after hours, and several were chosen to be background actors, while others restocked departments used by the production crew." Shooting at night "does something to your psyche," said Whaley. The filmmakers created an additional "Garden of Eden" set within the store, designed for an emotional scene between the film's leads. The film's working title was One Wild Night.

== Reception ==
=== Box office ===
Career Opportunities was a box office disappointment at the time of its release. It reached number four in its first week, earning $4,024,800, and made $11,336,986 in the North American market.

=== Critical response ===
A trailer used to advertise the film featured Connelly, posed seductively astride a kiddie riding horse. Rolling Stone later wondered if the filmmakers "perhaps realizing they had a complete dog of a movie on their hands, attempted to hard-sell the dubious teen flick as some sort of cleavage fanatic's wet dream." Hughes said the film was "a disappointment" because "I didn't have my usual creative controls." Hughes later stated the film was "cheap and vulgar" and that his suggestions were ignored. He says he tried to take his name off the film but Universal refused in the wake of the success of Home Alone. He added: "Suddenly I'm a commodity. If Home Alone hadn't come out my name wouldn't be on Career Opportunities four times."

Whaley said: "The movie kind of tanked." He added:

I think if they made that movie today it would be kind of cool, but it just lacked a little bit of the reverence of other movies written by John Hughes. The soundtrack was certainly classic John Hughes fare. I mean, I happen to think it's kind of a cool movie. I think it's different than his other movies, and I think that casting me was a daring move. [Laughs.] Because I didn't sort of fit into that mold. I played it a little bit different. I was just… slightly off. And I think that might've been part of the demise of the whole thing.

Rotten Tomatoes retrospectively gives the film a score of 37% based on reviews from 19 critics, with an average rating of 4.9 out of 10. On Metacritic, the film has a score of 41 out of 100 based on 14 reviews, indicating "mixed or average" reviews. Audiences surveyed by CinemaScore gave the film a grade of "C+" on scale of A+ to F.

Siskel & Ebert had mixed reactions on their syndicated TV review show. Siskel's "thumbs up" summary said Career Opportunities was "not a great movie" but made worthwhile by sympathetic performances from Whaley and Connelly. Ebert gave the film a "thumbs down" review and said it was "completely negligible" from start to finish.

== Home media ==
In August 2023, the Australian media company Via Vision, via its sublabel Imprint, released a remastered Blu-ray edition of Career Opportunities as part of its limited edition 3-film box set Film Focus: Jennifer Connelly (1991–2003). The film's extra features include audio commentary by director Bryan Gordon, interviews with Director of Photography Don McAlpine and co-stars Dermot Mulroney and Kieran Mulroney, and the film's theatrical trailer.
