= Tomorrow You're Gone =

- Directed by: David Jacobson
- Produced by: Good Deed Entertainment
- Edited by: Stan Salfas
- Release date: October 31, 2012
- Running time: 93 minutes
- Country: United States
- Language: English

Tomorrow You're Gone, also known as Boot Tracks, is a 2012 crime thriller film directed by David Jacobson.

== Plot ==
Charlie Rankin (Stephen Dorff), recently released from prison, seeks vengeance for his jail-house mentor William "The Buddha" Pettigrew (Willem Dafoe). Along the way, he meets the ethereal, yet streetwise, Florence Jane (Michelle Monaghan). They embark on an unlikely road trip, careening towards an unlikely redemption and uncertain resolution.

== Cast ==
- Stephen Dorff as Charlie Rankin
- Michelle Monaghan as Florence Jane
- Willem Dafoe as William "The Buddha" Pettigrew
- Tara Buck as Blonde Mistress
- Robert LaSardo as Ornay Corale
- Kerry Rossall as Chaney

== Reception ==
On Rotten Tomatoes, it has an approval rating of 7% based on reviews from 15 critics, with an average rating of 3.70/10. Metacritic, which uses a weighted average, assigned a score of 19 out of 100 based on 5 critics, indicating "overwhelming dislike".
