= Kerry Rossall =

American stuntman, actor and producer (born 1947)

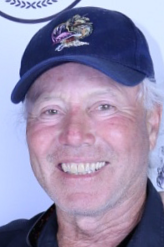
- Rossall in 2017
- Born: Kerry Darrell Rossall; June 23, 1947 (age 79); Burbank, California, U.S.
- Education: James Monroe High School
- Alma mater: California Western University
- Occupations: Stunt coordinator; stunt performer; actor; film producer
- Years active: 1975–present
- Known for: Apocalypse Now; Cobra; Friend of the World; Movin' Too Fast
- Notable credits: The Crow: City of Angels; The Judge; They Live; Tomorrow You're Gone
- Television: Babylon 5; The Fugitive; Justified
- Parent: Frederick J. Rossall

Kerry Darrell Rossall (born June 23, 1947) is an American stunt coordinator, stuntman, actor and film producer known for three Taurus World Stunt nominations for Apocalypse Now Redux (2001). He appeared in the films Apocalypse Now (1979), They Live (1988), The Crow: City of Angels (1996), Tomorrow You're Gone (2012) and produced the films Friend of the World (2020) and Movin' Too Fast (2006).

== Early life ==
Rossall was born in Burbank to Frederick J. Rossall of Sepulveda, California. He grew up in the San Fernando Valley and was a Boy Scout recipient of the God and Country award. Rossall attended James Monroe High School and was on the track team for pole vaulting and played American football. During his summer time in college, he surfed in Hawaii while studying as an economics major at California Western University.

After graduating, Rossall traveled to Europe and continued to surf. Upon his return, he had met stuntman Terry Leonard while working as a ski patrolman at Mammoth Mountain. Rossall was accepted to the Naval Aviation Program in Pensacola, Florida for Marine Corps boot camp and was learning to be a pilot when the Vietnam War ended. His aeronautics training helped prepare him for a career in the film industry. Despite being credited among stars like Arnold Schwarzenegger and Sylvester Stallone, he has remained out of the news for most of his career. Rossall resides in Carlsbad, California.

== Career ==
=== 1975–1979 ===
After they met in Mammoth, Terry Leonard asked Rossall if he wanted to work on The Wind and the Lion in Spain. Rossall agreed and got along with the director John Milius after discovering he surfed in Malibu. The next project for Milius was writing a script for Francis Ford Coppola. Rossall got involved after Leonard was signed on as the stunt coordinator.

==== Apocalypse Now ====
Rossall said his career in stunts and acting took off on the set of Apocalypse Now when he and Steve Boyum were initially there to double as a pair of surfers. Coppola was amused enough by their talent that he fired the original actors after the four of them had a surf-off. Rossall described the helicopter explosion sequence as the most dangerous. He was the lookout for himself and three other stuntmen. It was an expensive shot in which Rossall injured his shoulder, hit is head and caught on fire. He claimed that working with Coppola was inviting and that each day after filming, he would play racquetball with Robert Duvall who he also tried to teach how to surf. On screen, Rossall played "Mike from San Diego" and advises Bill Kilgore about Charlie's point, in which the Duvall's character responds, "Charlie don't surf!" Rossall was on the film set for over 6 months, involved in 5 of the 6 crucial stunts and worked on every major action sequence.

Following a rerelease in 2001 called Apocalypse Now Redux, Rossall shared Taurus World Stunt Awards nominations alongside stunt performers Terry Leonard, Steve Boyum and Joe Finnegan for 3 stunts in the film: Best Fire Stunt, Best Water Work, and Best Work With a Vehicle.

=== 1986–1998 ===
While filming Cobra, Rossall was doubling as a bad guy driver. While doing a test run, he was supposed stop a van 30 feet away from actress Brigitte Nielsen. His foot got tangled in some cables that had fallen from the dashboard and he braked too late. When the van stopped, it was 25 feet over its mark, a near fatal stunt that almost killed Nielsen. During the actual take, Rossall hit cement at 20 miles per hour, cracking his sternum and breaking his passenger's back.

During the filming of Babylon 5, actress Claudia Christian recalled Rossall choreographing a fight scene for the episode "Eyes" when he intentionally hit his head on a piece of cloth thought to be padded. A metal object underneath caused Rossall's head to swell and bleed, resulting in a noticeable lump.

=== 2006: Movin' Too Fast ===
Rossall produced the action film Movin' Too Fast written and directed by Eric Chambers. The film was completed in 2006 with Artist View Entertainment and starred Layla Alexander, Marquita Terry and Matthew Glave.

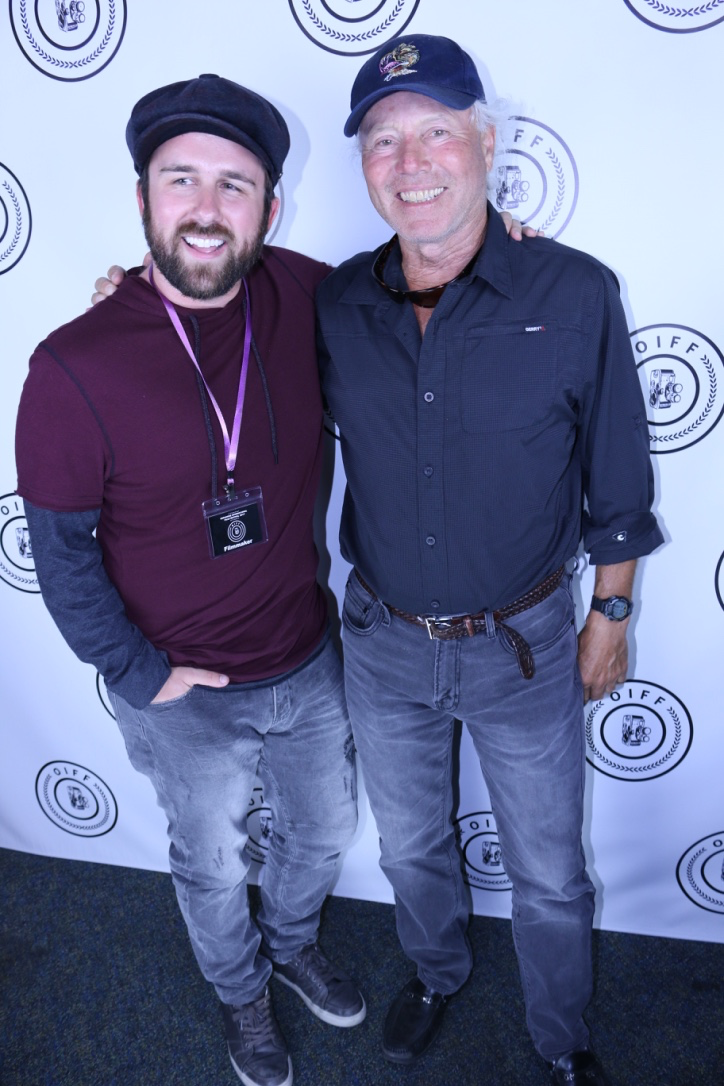
Rossall and Brian Patrick Butler at the Oceanside International Film Festival in 2017

=== 2008–2013 ===
Rossall met actor Don Handfield at a gas station after noticing Handfield's car had a camera mounted to it. He was later brought into Handfield's directorial project Driver's Ed as Second Unit Director. It was then pitched to Broken Lizard as a web series, but was eventually released as a television deal.

==== Justified ====
On February 3, 2011, Rossall was the stunt coordinator while filming an episode of the TV show Justified. At approximately 1:30 a.m., stunt performer Lisa Hoyle was knocked unconscious when a parked car rolled over her ankle after being hit by another car. She and another stunt performer said they were never informed that the car they were near would be involved in the stunt. She claimed she was getting food during the meeting in which the stunt was being explained. On February 1, 2013, Hoyle filed a lawsuit against Sony Pictures in which she says the incident wrecked her body and ruined her marriage. Rossall and Hoyle's husband, now divorced, were among the defendants in the case. Rossall had also organized a phone meeting about the stunt, but both performers allegedly were not informed of that call.

When I find that I'm afraid before performing any stunt, it tells me that further preparation is necessary.

=== 2017–2020: Friend of the World ===
In 2017, Rossall was the executive producer for the independent film Friend of the World written and directed by Brian Patrick Butler and starring Nick Young and Alexandra Slade. It was made in San Diego, premiered at the Oceanside International Film Festival in 2020 and was nominated for two San Diego Film Awards before it was distributed by Troma Entertainment and Cineverse. It is listed as one of the 100 Best Zombie Movies, Ranked by Tomatometer.

== Filmography ==
Film
Year	Title	Stunts	Actor	Producer	Notes
1975	The Wind and the Lion	Yes	No	No	uncredited
1979	Apocalypse Now	Yes	Yes	No	Mike from San Diego
1979	1941	Yes	No	No	
1980	In God We Tru$t	Yes	No	No	Stand-in
1982	Turkey Shoot	Yes	Yes	No	Officer arresting Chris
1983	Blue Thunder	Yes	No	No	
1983	Christine	Yes	No	No	Stand-in
1984	Breakin'	Yes	No	No	Stand-in
1984	Riptide	Yes	No	No	
1984	Red Dawn	Yes	No	No	Stand-in
1984	Starman	Yes	No	No	Stand-in
1986	Cobra	Yes	No	No	Stand-in
1986	Never Too Young to Die	Coordinator	No	No	Stand-in
1987	Death Before Dishonor	Coordinator	No	No	Stand-in
1987	Dragnet	Yes	No	No	Stand-in
1987	Dudes	Yes	No	No	Stand-in
1987	Big Shots	Yes	No	No	Stand-in
1988	Shakedown	Yes	No	No	Stand-in
1988	Rambo III	Yes	No	No	Stand-in
1988	Spellbinder	Yes	No	No	Stand-in
1988	They Live	No	Yes	No	2nd Unit Guard
1988	Moonwalker	Yes	No	No	
1989	The Abyss	Yes	No	No	Stand-in
1989	Breaking Point	Yes	No	No	
1989	Conquering Space	Yes	No	No	Short film
1989	Captain Power: The Beginning	Coordinator	No	No	
1990	Genuine Risk	Yes	No	No	Stand-in
1990	The Rookie	Yes	No	No	Stand-in
1991	Delta Force 3: The Killing Game	Coordinator	No	No	2nd unit director
1991	Flight of the Intruder	Yes	No	No	Stand-in
1993	Babylon 5: The Gathering	Coordinator	No	No	
1994	The Hard Truth	Yes	No	No	
1995	Automatic	Yes	No	No	
1995	Die Hard with a Vengeance	Yes	No	No	
1996	The Crow: City of Angels	Yes	Yes	No	Zeke
1997	The End of Violence	Yes	Yes	No	Featured Performer
1997	She's So Lovely	Coordinator	No	No	
1997	Air Force One	Yes	No	No	
1998	Running Woman	Yes	No	No	
1998	Babylon 5: In the Beginning	Yes	No	No	
1998	City of Angels	Yes	No	No	
1998	Six Days Seven Nights	Yes	Yes	No	Yacht Owner (uncredited)
1998	Babylon 5: Thirdspace	Coordinator	No	No	
1998	Blade	Yes	No	No	
1998	Finding Graceland	Yes	No	No	
1998	Rush Hour	Yes	No	No	
1998	Babylon 5: The River of Souls	Coordinator	No	No	
1998	Wanted	Yes	No	No	
1999	Babylon 5: A Call to Arms	Coordinator	No	No	
1999	The Limey	Yes	No	No	
1999	Crusade	Coordinator	No	No	
1999	Ride with the Devil	Yes	No	No	
2000	The Adventures of Rocky & Bullwinkle	Yes	No	No	
2001	Ocean's Eleven	Yes	Yes	No	Flashback Security Guard (uncredited)
2002	Local Boys	Yes	No	No	
2002	Road to Perdition	Yes	Yes	No	Rooney's Henchman (uncredited)
2003	The Life of David Gale	Coordinator	No	No	
2003	2 Fast 2 Furious	Yes	No	No	
2003	American Wedding	Coordinator	No	No	
2003	Bad Santa	Yes	Yes	No	Policeman
2003	Timeline	Yes	No	No	
2003	The Haunted Mansion	Yes	No	No	
2004	The Last Ride	Yes	No	No	
2004	The Terminal	Yes	No	No	
2004	Meet the Fockers	Yes	No	No	
2005	Movin' Too Fast	Coordinator	No	Yes	2nd unit director
2006	Alpha Dog	Coordinator	No	No	
2006	10th & Wolf	Coordinator	No	No	
2006	Mission: Impossible III	Yes	No	No	
2006	Poseidon	Yes	No	No	
2006	The Fast and the Furious: Tokyo Drift	Yes	No	No	
2006	World Trade Center	Yes	No	No	
2007	Blades of Glory	Yes	Yes	No	Fire Extinguisher
2007	Slipstream	Yes	No	No	Double
2007	I Now Pronounce You Chuck & Larry	Yes	No	No	
2008	Semi-Pro	Yes	No	No	
2008	Spy School	Coordinator	No	No	
2008	Get Smart	Yes	No	No	Double
2008	Adventures in Appletown	Coordinator	No	No	
2009	Driver's Ed	No	No	No	2nd unit director
2009	Without a Paddle: Nature's Calling	Coordinator	No	No	
2010	Gulliver's Travels	Yes	No	No	
2011	The Muppets	Yes	No	No	
2012	This Means War	Yes	No	No	
2012	Music High	Consultant	No	No	
2012	Tomorrow You're Gone	Yes	Yes	No	Chaney
2013	Gangster Squad	Yes	No	No	
2013	InAPPropriate Comedy	Yes	No	No	
2013	Deep Dark Canyon	Coordinator	No	No	
2013	12 Years a Slave	Yes	No	No	
2014	The Judge	Yes	No	No	Double for Robert Duvall
2015	La Migra	Yes	No	No	Safety consultant
2016	Sully	Yes	No	No	
2016	Masterminds	2nd unit coordinator	Yes	No	Trunk Hostage (uncredited)
2018	First Timers	No	No	Yes	Short film
2020	Friend of the World	No	No	Executive	

Television
Year	Title	Stunts	Actor	Notes
1983	The A-Team	Yes	No	Episode: "Mexican Slayride"
1984	Knight Rider	Yes	No	Van Driver #1 (uncredited)
1985	Hunter	Yes	No	Eddie Marx
1988	Captain Power and the Soldiers of the Future	Yes	Yes	Jack
1988	Santa Barbara	Yes	Yes	Biker (2 episodes)
1994–1998	Babylon 5	Coordinator	No	111 episodes
1998–1999	Walker, Texas Ranger	Yes	Yes	Bad Guy, Mace, Joe Martin
2000–2001	The Fugitive	Coordinator	No	14 episodes
2001	The Agency	Coordinator	No	
2010	Hawthorne	Coordinator	No	4 episodes
2010–2011	Justified	Coordinator	No	10 episodes

Accolades
Festival	Year	Title	Award	Result	Notes
Taurus World Stunt Awards	2002	Apocalypse Now Redux	Best Fire	Nominated	shared with Steve Boyum, Joe Finnegan, Terry Leonard
Taurus World Stunt Awards	2002	Apocalypse Now Redux	Best Work with a Vehicle	Nominated	shared with Steve Boyum, Joe Finnegan, Terry Leonard
Taurus World Stunt Awards	2002	Apocalypse Now Redux	Best Water Work	Nominated	shared with Steve Boyum
San Diego Film Awards	2020	Friend of the World	Best Narrative Feature Film	Nominated	shared with Brian Patrick Butler and Luke Pensabene
