= Sonya Eddy =

American actress (1967–2022)

- Eddy in Seinfeld (1998)
- Born: June 17, 1967; Concord, California, U.S.
- Died: December 19, 2022 (aged 55); Burbank, California, U.S.
- Occupation: Actress
- Years active: 1990–2022

Sonya Eddy (June 17, 1967 – December 19, 2022) was an American actress. She was best known for playing Epiphany Johnson in the American ABC soap opera General Hospital (2006—2022) for which she won a posthumous Daytime Emmy Award for Outstanding Supporting Actress in a Drama Series in 2023.

== Early life and education ==
Eddy was born in Concord, California, on June 17, 1967. She majored in theatre and dance at University of California, Davis and received her B.A. in 1992.

== Career ==
Eddy made her acting debut in the West Coast premiere of Ruby Dee's play Zora Is My Name in 1990. Other stage credits included The Comedy of Errors, The Witch in Stephen Sondheim's Into the Woods and Bloody Mary in South Pacific. In 1995, Eddy moved to Los Angeles and appeared in such sitcoms as Married... with Children, The Drew Carey Show, Murphy Brown, Seinfeld and Home Improvement. She made her big screen debut playing nurse in the 1996 comedy film High School High. The following years, Eddy played "nurse" roles in a number of movies, include Sour Grapes (1998), Patch Adams (1998), Inspector Gadget (1999), and Seven Pounds (2008). Often playing comedic parts, Eddy appeared in films Nutty Professor II: The Klumps (2000), Barbershop (2002), Daddy Day Care (2003), Surviving Christmas (2004) and Pee-wee's Big Holiday (2016). From 2004 to 2005, she had a recurring role on Joan of Arcadia. She also played dramatic role in the 2006 biographical film Coach Carter.

In 2006, Eddy was cast as no-nonsense head nurse Epiphany Johnson on the ABC daytime soap opera, General Hospital on a recurring basis. Eddy was upgraded to contract status in August 2007. From 2007 to 2008, she was a regular cast member on the prime time spin-off series, General Hospital: Night Shift for Soapnet. She was downgraded to recurring status in 2011. She appeared on soap until October 20, 2022. She received a posthumous Daytime Emmy Award for Outstanding Supporting Actress in a Drama Series in 2023.

Eddy also made guest-starring appearances on Reba, Monk, House, ER, Desperate Housewives, Mike & Molly, 2 Broke Girls, The Middle, Mom and Castle. She played Ramona, another no-nonsense personal nurse, in the FX sitcom Legit from 2013 to 2014. From 2016 to 2019, she played Tammy in the truTV comedy series, Those Who Can't. She also had recurring roles on Fresh Off the Boat, Black Jesus and the miniseries The Last Days of Ptolemy Grey. Her final screen appearance was in the 2023 musical comedy film Dicks: The Musical.

== Death ==
Eddy died on December 19, 2022, at the age of 55. Her cause of death was an infection after non-emergency surgery.

== Filmography ==
=== Film ===
Year	Title	Role	Notes
1996	High School High	Nurse	
1997	Blast	Bena	
1997	Motel Blue	Motel Blue Maid April Swanson	
1998	Sour Grapes	Nurse Loder	
1998	The Godson	Bank Clerk	
1998	Patch Adams	Annie	
1998	Sorcerers	Ruth	
1999	Blast from the Past	Patrice	
1999	Inspector Gadget	Hospital Secretary Mary Blakeson	
2000	Nutty Professor II: The Klumps	Marie the Heavyset Woman	
2000	Dish Dogs	May	Video
2000	Ten Grand	Aunt Ruthie	Video
2001	The Jennie Project	Donna	TV movie
2002	Strange Hearts	Lynette	
2002	Buying the Cow	Rhonda	
2002	Barbershop	Janelle	
2002	The Third Society	Arlene McGregor	
2002	The Fine Line Between Cute and Creepy	Thelma	Short
2003	A Single Rose	Carlene	Short
2003	Mi Casa, Su Casa	Belinda	
2003	Daddy Day Care	Sandy	
2003	Matchstick Men	Maureen Fisher	
2003	Leprechaun: Back 2 tha Hood	Yolanda	Video
2004	Y.M.I.	DVD's Mom	
2004	One Last Ride	Sally	
2004	Promised Land	Claire	
2004	Surviving Christmas	Elaine	
2004	Office Max: Motivational Poster	Marla	Short
2005	Coach Carter	Worm's Mother	
2005	Come Away Home	Sonya Warfield	
2005	Bad News Bears	Ruby	
2005	The Reading Room	Mrs. Carr	TV movie
2005	Lost in Plainview	Joy	
2006	Gridiron Gang	Theresa Wendal	
2007	Year of the Dog	Nurse Willheima	
2008	Player 5150	Jean	
2008	Disfigured	Pam Jones	
2008	Seven Pounds	Nurse Edna	
2009	The Perfect Game	Rose Bell	
2010	Trim	Liz	
2011	Answers to Nothing	Nurse Edwards	
2011	Dorfman	Lil G	
2012	K-11	Teresa Luna	
2013	Miss Dial	Refried Bean Caller	
2013	The Incredible Burt Wonderstone	Hanna	
2013	RockBarnes: The Emperor in You	Shante	
2014	The Hive	Nurse Tessa Jean	
2016	Pee-wee's Big Holiday	Wanda	
2017	OH BABY	Nurse McQueen	Short
2017	Fixed	Wang	
2017	Thumper	Nurse Daniels	
2021	The Good Balloon	Denise	Short
2021	Good on Paper	Judge Harriet Gold	
2021	I Live Alone	Olivia	Short
2022	Frank and Penelope	Nurse	
2022	V/H/S/99	Debra	Segment: "Ozzy's Dungeon"
2022	Satanic Hispanics	Detective Gibbons	Segment: "The Traveler and San La Muerte"
2023	Dicks: The Musical	Sonya the Old Lady	Posthumous release

=== Television ===
Year	Title	Role	Notes
1995	The Drew Carey Show	Marie	1 episode
1995	Married... with Children	Arlene / Betty	2 episodes
1996	Martin	Lucille	1 episode
1997	Beverly Hills, 90210	Nurse Carla	1 episode
1997	Saved by the Bell: The New Class	Angie	1 episode
1997	Murphy Brown	Estelle	1 episode
1997	Family Matters	Esther	1 episode
1997	Arli$$	Nurse Brooks	2 episodes
1997–1998	Tracey Takes On...	Sonya	2 episodes
1997–1998	Seinfeld	Rebecca DeMornay	Episode: "The Muffin Tops" & "The Bookstore"
1998	3rd Rock from the Sun	Joanne	1 episode
1998	Any Day Now	Jasmine	1 episode
1998	Martial Law	Anne	1 episode
1998	To Have & to Hold	Delilah	1 episode
1998	USA High	Lady	1 episode
1999	Home Improvement	Gayle	1 episode
1999	Malibu, CA	Bertha	1 episode
1999	Touched by an Angel	Mrs. Taggert	1 episode
1999	Providence	Impatient #1	1 episode
1999	Popular	Receptionist	1 episode
2000	Strip Mall	Nurse	1 episode
2000	Gilmore Girls	Cashier	1 episode
2001	Even Stevens	Mrs. Walters	1 episode
2001	Lizzie McGuire	Photographer	1 episode
2001	The Invisible Man	The Maid	2 episodes
2001	Diagnosis: Murder	Mrs. Troobnik	1 episode
2001	Resurrection Blvd.	Hospital Receptionist	1 episode
2001	Spyder Games	Hospital Nurse	1 episode
2001	The Mind of the Married Man	-	1 episode
2001; 2006	ER	Student Affairs Secretary / Harriet	3 episodes
2001–2002	Primetime Glick	Miss Gathercole's Nurse	Recurring role, 5 episodes
2002	Felicity	Cop	1 episode
2002	Reba	Susan	1 episode
2002	Still Standing	Carla	1 episode
2003	The Pitts	Meter Maid	1 episode
2003	Monk	Opal	1 episode
2003	MADtv	Star Jones	1 episode
2004	Phil of the Future	Miss Donaldson	1 episode
2004	House	Sally	1 episode
2004–2005	Joan of Arcadia	Female Custodian God	4 episodes
2005	Less than Perfect	Security Woman	1 episode
2005	Inconceivable	Nurse Dawson	1 episode
2006	Malcolm in the Middle	Mabel	1 episode
2006	Day Break	Waitress	1 episode
2006–2022	General Hospital	Epiphany Johnson	Main role, 543 episodes
2007	In Case of Emergency	Sonya	1 episode
2007	Everybody Hates Chris	DMV Clerk	1 episode
2007	CSI: Crime Scene Investigation	Cab Dispatcher	1 episode
2007–2008	General Hospital: Night Shift	Epiphany Johnson	Main role, 25 episodes
2008	Desperate Housewives	Vanessa	1 episode
2010	Good Luck Charlie	Verna	1 episode
2011	Glee	Angry Mom	1 episode
2011	Mike & Molly	Kay	1 episode
2011–2012	The Middle	Senora Porter	2 episodes
2012	2 Broke Girls	Freddie	1 episode
2013	Partners	Denise	1 episode
2013	Monday Mornings	Joanne Whitman	1 episode
2013	Bad Samaritans	Regina	1 episode
2013	Zach Stone Is Gonna Be Famous	-	1 episode
2013	Baby Daddy	Priest	1 episode
2013–2014	Legit	Ramona	Recurring role, 12 episodes
2014	Girl Meets World	Geralyn Thompson	1 episode
2014	Mulaney	Gerta	1 episode
2015	Mom	Angela	1 episode
2016	Castle	Olivia "Mama" Toussaint	1 episode
2016	Crazy Ex-Girlfriend	Professor Andrade	1 episode
2016	Adam Ruins Everything	Pet Store Owner	1 episode
2016–2019	Those Who Can't	Tammy	Recurring role, 31 episodes
2019	A Black Lady Sketch Show	Principal Dixon	1 episode
2019	Black Jesus	Miss Emma	4 episodes
2020	Tommy	CPS Worker	1 episode
2021	PEN15	Grace	1 episode
2022	The Last Days of Ptolemy Grey	Miss Delia	Miniseries, 2 episodes

=== Video games ===
Year	Title	Role	Notes
2008	Saints Row 2	Various	
2011	Driver: San Francisco	Additional Voices	
2012	Guild Wars 2	Lyra Lancetooth, Riel Darkwater	
