= Christina Agamanolis =

Christina Agamanolis (born August 31, 1975) is an American composer and songwriter of Greek descent. Her work includes film scoring, classical composition, and experimental and electroacoustic music. Her works are included in the Greek National Archives of Composers.

== Career ==
Agamanolis co-founded Siren Music Productions with composers Mariana Bernoski and Willow Williamson. The trio collaborated on film and television scores, and also performed as a band, releasing the album This Side of North. The album featured tracks mixed by DJ Orion Keyser and produced by Lee Mars, with drummer Chris Vrenna providing percussion.

She co-composed the score for David Jacobson's Dahmer (2002), a film starring Jeremy Renner, which earned multiple nominations, including for the Independent Spirit Awards’ John Cassavetes Award. The Variety review of Dahmer recognized the film's soundtrack for its "unnerving" atmosphere, created by blending selected sounds and electronic elements. Agamanolis also co-composed the score for the Emmy Award-winning documentary Be Good, Smile Pretty (2003), directed by Tracy Droz Tragos.

Other notable works include the opening titles for Fata Morgana, which won the Young German Cinema Award at the Munich Film Festival. The opening title song was a cover of Rare Bird's Sympathy, co-written with collaborator and singer Ryan Anton. She co-composed the music for Alonso Mayo's Wednesday Afternoon, which won a Student Academy Award. Her individual pieces can be heard in This Girl’s Life (2003).

Agamanolis taught at Oberlin Conservatory of Music as a Visiting Professor of Technology in Music and Related Arts (2001).

== Cultural recognition ==
Christina Agamanolis is included in the Archive of Greek Classical Composers for her work as a composer of Greek descent.

Thomas Tamvakos, a music writer, critic, researcher and archivist, has written articles about Agamanolis, including:

- An artist profile article in Jazz and Tzaz (2000).
- An article in Mousikos Tonos (2004), where Agamanolis was listed among composers whose works were performed at a concert in March 2004 at the "Filippos Nakas" concert hall, which focused on Greek and Greek-origin female composers of classical music.

In 2008, Tar magazine published an article about Agamanolis and her compositions.

Agamanolis is referenced in the following musicological works, including:

- Hellenic Music Publications, Tome 1, Α-Β (2022) by George Constantzos and Thomas Tamvakos, with mentions on pages 14-15.
- Compositrices / Women composers / Komponistinnen / Mujeres compositoras (1914-2005) by Arthur Chimkovitch.
- Western Music in Hellenic Communities: Musicians and Institutions, where she is referenced on page 265.

Agamanolis is also included on the Greek Women Composers page of a website created by the Department of Music Studies at the University of Athens, as part of the Musical Bounce Back project, co-funded by the Erasmus+ program of the European Union.

== Educational years ==
Agamanolis studied at Oberlin College, where she earned a B.M. in Technology in Music and Related Arts, before pursuing an M.F.A. in Composition with New Media and Integrated Media at California Institute of the Arts (Calarts). She studied with Gary Nelson, Kristine Burns, Richard Povall, Morton Subotnic, Stephen Mosko, Mark Trayle, and Sara Roberts.

While at Oberlin, her composition On The Inside was highlighted as the "most striking" of the evening by The Oberlin Review in 1996. In December 1997, Agamanolis choreographed and performed Richard Povall’s piece for vocals and body called Bodysinging at Experimental Intermedia, curated by Phill Niblock. An improvisational performance, the program focused on body-driven music and multi-channel video.

While at Calarts, her electroacoustic composition Aftermath was included on the Sonic Circuits VII compilation. Agamanolis also composed music for “The Eighth Day”, a dance piece choreographed by Austin Hartel, co-creator of Pilobolus Dance Theater. Exploring the creation of the world, the piece was performed by the Ballet Nacional de Paraguay in Asunción during the summer of 2000.

During college and shortly thereafter, her music was performed at electronic music festivals including Threshold and Society of Composers Incorporated (SCI) concerts. John Henken of the LA Times, reviewing the CEIAT Electronic Music Festival (Center for Experiments in Art, Information and Technology), referred to Agamanolis' piece Noiseless as possibly representing a new direction in the genre.

== Artistic approach ==
Agamanolis’ “philosophical background regarding music creation is that the artist should communicate [their] inner feelings to the public with sincerity,” as noted in Thomas Tamvakos' 2001 artistic profile in Jazz and Tzaz. Agamanolis has created works in multiple styles and genres. She studied classical piano, jazz guitar and bass, and classical guitar. She employs a diverse range of compositional techniques, including traditional motivic and thematic development, conceptualism, improvisation, experimentalism, chance music, spectralism, algorithmic composition, extended techniques, and electroacoustic approaches such as found sound and musique concrète, as well as minimalism.

== Notable projects ==
- Be Good, Smile Pretty (Emmy Award-winning documentary)
- Dahmer (Film with Jeremy Renner, multiple Independent Spirit Award nominations)
- Fata Morgana (Winner, Young German Cinema Award)
- The O Tapes (Original score for Showtime feature. *Note: Music by Siren Music Productions.)
- Wednesday Afternoon (Student Academy Award-winning short film)
- A Low Down Dirty Shame Soundtrack - (Gold-certified - Assistant Engineer, Assistant)
- Hidden Landscape (Ambient compilation includes Agamanolis' track Winter. *Note: misprint music track 5 by Siren)
- Innova Sonic Circuits VII – (Electronic music compilation includes Agamanolis' track Aftermath)
