= Down in the Valley (film) =

2005 American film by David Jacobson

- Theatrical release poster
- Directed by: David Jacobson
- Written by: David Jacobson
- Produced by: David Jacobson; Stavros Merjos; Bill Migliore; Edward Norton; Adam Rosenfelt; Holly Wiersma
- Starring: Edward Norton; Evan Rachel Wood; David Morse; Rory Culkin; Aviva
- Cinematography: Enrique Chediak
- Edited by: David Jacobson; Lynzee Klingman; Edward Harrison (pseud. of Edward Norton)
- Music by: Peter Salett
- Distributed by: THINKFilm (United States); Summit Entertainment (Overseas)
- Release dates: May 13, 2005 (Cannes); May 5, 2006 (United States)
- Running time: 117 minutes
- Country: United States
- Language: English
- Box office: $568,932

Down in the Valley is a 2005 American neo-Western drama film starring Edward Norton, Evan Rachel Wood, David Morse and Rory Culkin. The film made its debut in the Un Certain Regard section at the 2005 Cannes Film Festival on May 13, and made its limited theatrical release in North America on May 5, 2006.

== Plot ==
In the San Fernando Valley, rebellious teenager October "Tobe" takes a walk with her younger brother, Lonnie. The next day, Tobe goes to the beach with friends, and when they stop for gas, they are assisted by Harlan, a man who affects a folksy, cowboy style. Tobe invites the much-older Harlan to the beach. He accepts, which results in his losing his job. At the beach, they kiss and, after returning to Harlan's house, they have sex. He takes her on a date, and the trio get something to eat. Later that night, they go on their "real" date, dancing and meeting up with Tobe's friends for another party, where Harlan takes drugs. Tobe returns home the next day; as she has returned home long after she was expected, Wade, her father, becomes enraged, and she retreats to her room. When she refuses to talk, he pounds on the door and leaves visible damage.

Tobe continues to see Harlan. Her father's rage increases, and he shatters her bedroom window. Tobe and Harlan ride a horse that supposedly belongs to one of Harlan's friends named Charlie. Upon returning, Charlie claims he has never met Harlan and that the horse was stolen. The couple are held in police custody until Wade comes to pick up Tobe. She tells Harlan that they should no longer see each other. Harlan, however, is persistent and takes Lonnie shooting without Wade's permission. Wade orders Harlan at gunpoint to leave his children alone.

Harlan is revealed to be mentally unstable, getting evicted from his apartment after shooting at his reflection in a mirror, imagining a Wild West-style "shootout". After an awkward incident at a local synagogue, where he is abruptly ushered out, he breaks into what is presumably the house of his father, who is revealed to be a Hasidic Jew. He leaves the letter he has been narrating throughout the film after taking valuable religious silver pieces and the contents of a box in a closet inscribed with the name Marty and containing photos of himself as a child. He breaks into Tobe's house and packs a bag so that they can run away. When Tobe comes home to find him, she is dumbfounded, happy to see him at first. As she slowly realizes he is deranged, she tells him she does not want to leave her family and that he should go. As they argue, Harlan shoots her in the stomach.

When Tobe's father returns home to find Tobe alone on her bed, barely alive, he suspects Harlan, who has failed in an attempt at calling 911 and run away. Wade rushes Tobe to the hospital, where she is attached to a respirator and remains in a coma. Harlan, who is covered in Tobe's blood, then shoots himself in the side to conceal Tobe's blood and also make it look like it was Wade who had shot them. Harlan finds Lonnie and convinces him that it was really Wade who shot Tobe, and that Harlan was wounded while trying to stop him. Tobe regains consciousness at the hospital and Wade realizes that Harlan has taken Lonnie. At night while Harlan and Lonnie are by a fire, Wade, Charlie and a detective named Sheridan arrive. Harlan shoots Charlie before riding off with Lonnie.

They stumble upon a Western film set where shooting has just begun. Wade and Sheridan arrive with two more police officers. During the shootout, Harlan shoots Detective Sheridan and one of the police officers. Harlan and Lonnie escape to a construction site, where Wade finds them and another shootout ensues. Wade shoots Harlan to death to the horror of Lonnie.

Later, Wade drives Tobe and Lonnie to a place where Tobe and Harlan had a pleasant day. Tobe is holding a box that contains Harlan's ashes. Her brother asks her what they should say about him. She replies, "Don't say anything, just think it," and scatters the ashes.

== Cast ==
Actor	Role
Edward Norton	Harlan Fairfax Curruthers
Evan Rachel Wood	October "Tobe" Sommers
David Morse	Wade Sommers
Rory Culkin	Lonnie "Twig" Sommers
Bruce Dern	Charlie
John Diehl	Steve
Geoffrey Lewis	Sheridan
Artel Kayàru	Boulevard Guy
Elizabeth Peña	Gale
Kat Dennings	April
Hunter Parrish	Kris
Aviva Farber	Sherri
Terrence Evans	Director
Aaron Fors	Jeremy

== Writing ==
Writer David Jacobson was inspired to write this film by his childhood in the San Fernando Valley. He commented that there was never much to do except throw things onto the highway (which possibly inspired a deleted scene from the film titled Don't Look), have dirt clod fights, and spending many hot summer days at the local cinema with friends, watching the same films over and over. One favorite was Butch Cassidy and the Sundance Kid, which he watched seventeen times. Jacobson also has noted that he and his sister were mild backgrounds for Tobe and Lonnie. The script was written with loose scenes, and is considered by Jacobson himself to be some of his lighter work.

== Critical reception ==
On the review aggregation website Rotten Tomatoes, the film holds a 53% approval rating, based on 100 reviews. The website's consensus reads, "The premise of Old West clashing with modern suburbia is fresh and initially intriguing, but the second act degenerates into a clumsy jumble of events which strain credibility." Metacritic, which uses a weighted average, assigned the film a score of 65 out of 100, based on 33 critics, indicating "generally favorable" reviews.

American movie critic Roger Ebert expressed mixed feelings about the film in his review for the Chicago Sun-Times. On the one hand, he noted several qualities "that make me happy to have seen it", especially the nuanced acting performance of Edward Norton and the "peculiar loneliness" of his character Harlan. On the other hand, Ebert took issue with the film's ending which he found to be implausible and driven too much by the abstract idea behind the plot instead of the characters in it.
