= Aviva Baumann =

American actress (born 1984 or 1985)

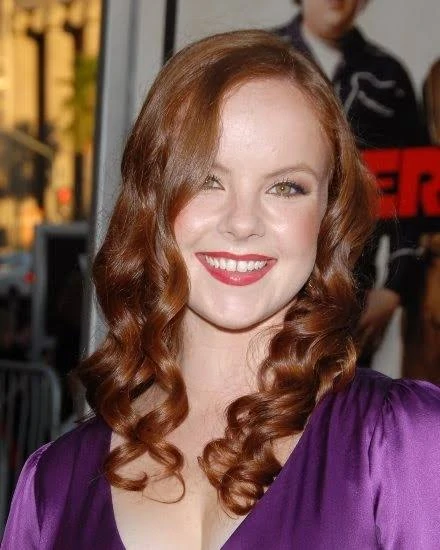
- Baumann in 2007
- Born: Aviva Farber; 1984 or 1985 (age 41–42)
- Occupation: Actress
- Years active: 1993–2012
- Spouse: Ken Baumann (m. 2012)
- Relatives: James Karen (uncle)

Aviva Baumann (née Farber; born 1984 or 1985) is an American actress. She is known for playing Nicola in the comedy film Superbad (2007), young Shannon Gibbs on the military police procedural series NCIS, and Mandy on the sitcom Party Down.

== Early life ==
Baumann's mother is real-estate agent and former dancer Laurie Farber-Condon; her father, Aram Farber, is a contractor. Raised in Santa Fe, New Mexico, Baumann appeared in a Downy commercial when she was 5 years old and in the television miniseries The Fire Next Time when she was 8. She learned four styles of dancing from local teachers and planned to have a dancing career. When she was 16 years old, she joined the Oakland Ballet after graduating from Santa Fe High School. She returned to Santa Fe and, by age 18, desired a change in careers. She relocated to Los Angeles, where her aunt, Alba Francesca, became her manager. She lived in the same building with Francesca and her uncle, character actor James Karen.

== Career ==
Baumann was in the films Down in the Valley and Guides. Television shows on which she has appeared include Cold Case and Malcolm in the Middle.

== Personal life ==
Baumann married actor Ken Baumann in Malibu on June 16, 2012. She is Jewish.

== Filmography ==
Year	Title	Role	Notes
1994	Troublemakers	Schoolgirl #1	
1997	Up Above the World	Maggie	
2005	Desperate Hippies	Chee	
2005	Down in the Valley	Sherri	
2006	Gene Simmons Family Jewels	Herself	Episode: "Loose Change"
2006	Forgiving the Franklins	Caroline Franklin	
2007	Rolling	Pippi	Independent film
2007	Out of Jimmy's Head	Emily	Episode: "Skate Night"
2007	Superbad	Nicola	
2007	Cold Case	Celeste Church - 1997	Episode: "Stand Up and Holler"
2008	Criminal Minds	Sarah Henson	Episode: "The Crossing"
2008; 2012	NCIS	Shannon Gibbs	Episodes: "Heartland" and "Mother's Day" Fielding (season 7)
2009	Saint John of Las Vegas	Penny	
2009	The Closer	Jenna West	Episode: "Elysian Fields"
2010	Party Down	Mandy	Episodes: "Jackal Onassis Backstage Party" (season 2) and "Precious Lights Pre-School Auction" (season 2)
2010	Spring Break '83	Heather	
2010	Law & Order: LA	Stephanie Kasdan	Episode: "Hondo Field"
2011	Black Velvet	River Girl	Final film role
2011	Burn Notice	Eve	Episode: "No Good Deed"
