= Sour Grapes (1998 film) =

1998 film by Larry David

- Theatrical release poster
- Directed by: Larry David
- Written by: Larry David
- Produced by: Laurie Lennard
- Starring: Steven Weber; Craig Bierko; Matt Keeslar; Karen Sillas; Viola Harris; Robyn Peterman
- Cinematography: Victor Hammer
- Edited by: Priscilla Nedd-Friendly
- Music by: Stewart Copeland
- Production company: Castle Rock Entertainment
- Distributed by: Columbia Pictures (Select territories); Warner Bros. (International)
- Release date: April 17, 1998
- Running time: 91 minutes
- Country: United States
- Language: English
- Box office: $123,104

Sour Grapes is a 1998 American black comedy film written and directed by Larry David and starring Steven Weber, Craig Bierko, Viola Harris, Karen Sillas, Robyn Peterman and Matt Keeslar. It was released on April 17, 1998, by Columbia Pictures.

== Plot ==
Richie Maxwell is down to his last quarter at a slot machine in Atlantic City, so he asks his cousin Evan for two more coins for one more spin – a spin that wins a $436,000 jackpot.

The joy of victory is quickly replaced by a fierce disagreement over who deserves what. Richie begins by offering Evan a very small percentage of his winnings. Evan didn't expect anything at first but now he is offended because he provided two-thirds of the money Richie spent on the spin.

A bitter feud develops. Richie, a sneaker designer, opts to keep all the money and quits his job. Evan, an oncologist, is so annoyed that, as a prank, he lets Richie believe he is dying. By the time he reveals the joke, Richie has already tried to kill his mother (by staging a fake break-in in hopes of triggering a fatal heart attack) to spare her the grief of losing him. Evan is rattled on hearing this and makes a severe mistake during a surgery.

In the end, Richie loses all his money and winds up right back where he started. Despondent, he goes home to perform oral sex on himself – a pastime of his.

== Cast ==
- Steven Weber as Evan Maxwell
- Craig Bierko as Richie Maxwell
- Viola Harris as Selma Maxwell
- Karen Sillas as Joan
- Robyn Peterman as Roberta
- Matt Keeslar as Danny Pepper
- Jennifer Leigh Warren as Millie
- Orlando Jones as Digby
- John Toles-Bey as Lee
- Deirdre Lovejoy as Nurse Wells
- Richard Gant as Det. Crouch
- Philip Baker Hall as Mr. Bell
- Sonya Eddy as Nurse Loder
- Kristin Davis as Riggs
- Larry David as Studio executive / Annoying doctor / Singing bum

== Production ==
It was shot between May and July 1997, after Larry David had left Seinfeld. Locations used include New York, Long Beach, California and Atlantic City, New Jersey.

== Reception ==
The film received generally poor reviews from critics, and has a 27% rating on Rotten Tomatoes from 15 reviews. The film made it on the 2000 list of Roger Ebert's most hated films, and awarded the film zero stars out of four, remarking in his review that, "I can't easily remember a film I've enjoyed less." He criticized its mean-spirited nature, saying "Sour Grapes is a comedy about things that aren't funny [...] Larry David, who wrote and directed Sour Grapes, apparently thinks people are amused by cancer, accidental castration, racial stereotypes and bitter family feuds." Leonard Klady of Variety wrote in his review that, "the idea of good intentions misfiring is a driving force of the humor in Sour Grapes. But bad intentions also provide hilarity here, and the domino effect each has on escalating the stakes is alarming, outrageous and very real." He added, "there's an edginess that periodically spins out into crass overstatement. Richie's mom is too much of a harridan of a Jewish matriarch, and low sexual comedy is used for easy laughs. These are unnecessary crutches in an otherwise clever and humorously realized movie."

Larry David himself has expressed regrets over the film. A poster for the film was put up on the set of David's office for the filming of Curb Your Enthusiasm's pilot episode. David had the poster promptly removed because he got "sick of looking at it" after one show. In a later episode, David's character tells his wife to stop lending people the film, and says he doesn't believe a friend who claimed to have enjoyed the movie, stating she was just trying to be polite.
