= David Jacobson (director) =

American film director

David Jacobson is an American screenwriter and film director from Van Nuys, Los Angeles, California. His film Down in the Valley was screened in the Un Certain Regard section at the 2005 Cannes Film Festival. Jacobson also directed Dahmer (film) in 2002, a feature film based on the prolific serial killer Jeffrey Dahmer.

== Feature films ==
- Criminal (1994)
- Dahmer (2002)
- Down in the Valley (2005)
- Tomorrow You're Gone (2012)
