= 14th Saturn Awards =

US film and television award ceremony

- Date: May 17, 1987
- Site: California, U.S.

Highlights
- Most awards: Aliens (8)
- Most nominations: Aliens (11); Star Trek IV: The Voyage Home (11)

The 14th Saturn Awards, honoring the best in science fiction, fantasy and horror film in 1986, were held on May 17, 1987.

== Winners and nominees ==
Below is a complete list of nominees and winners. Winners are highlighted in bold.

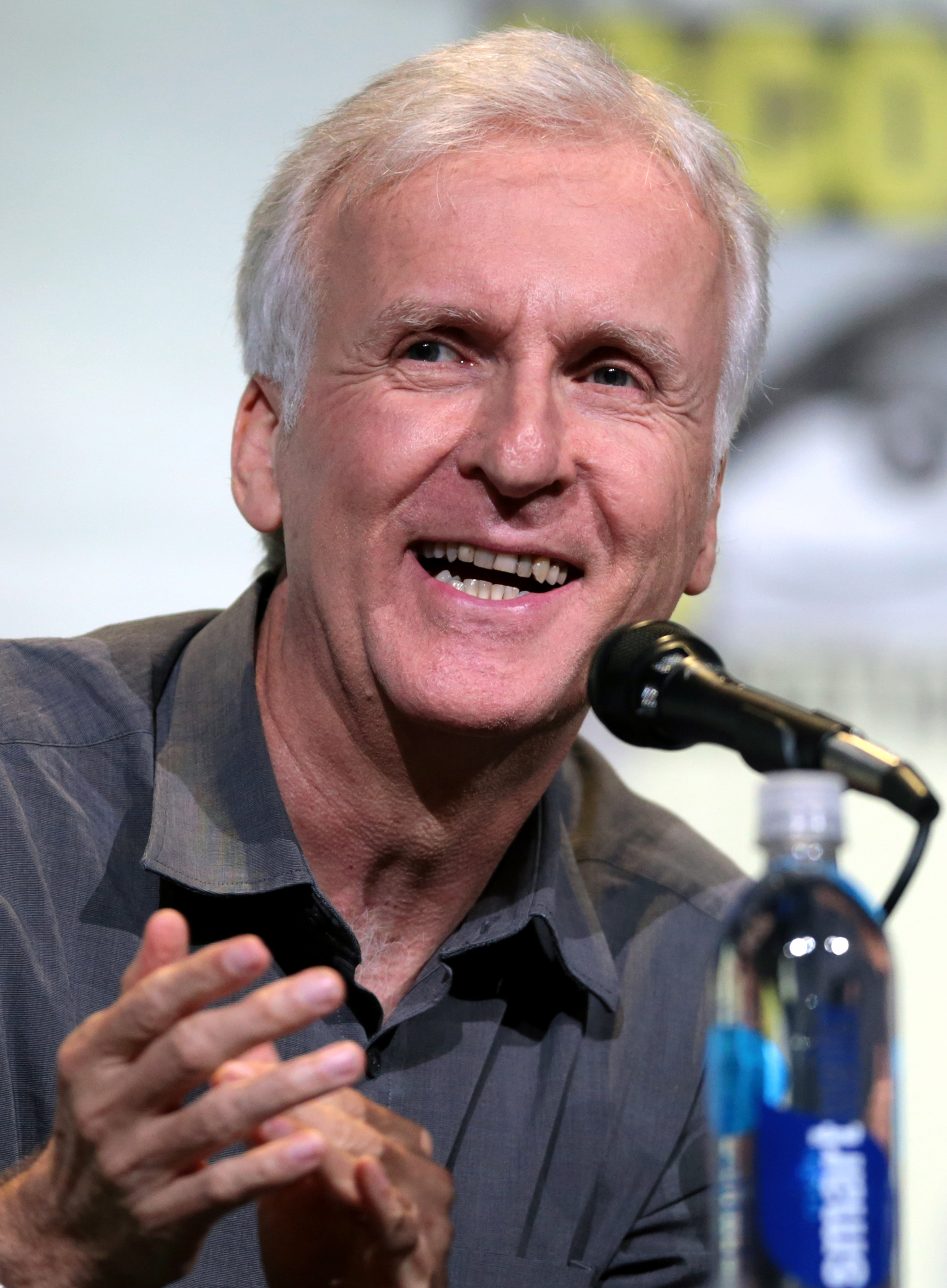
James Cameron, Best Director and Best Writing winner

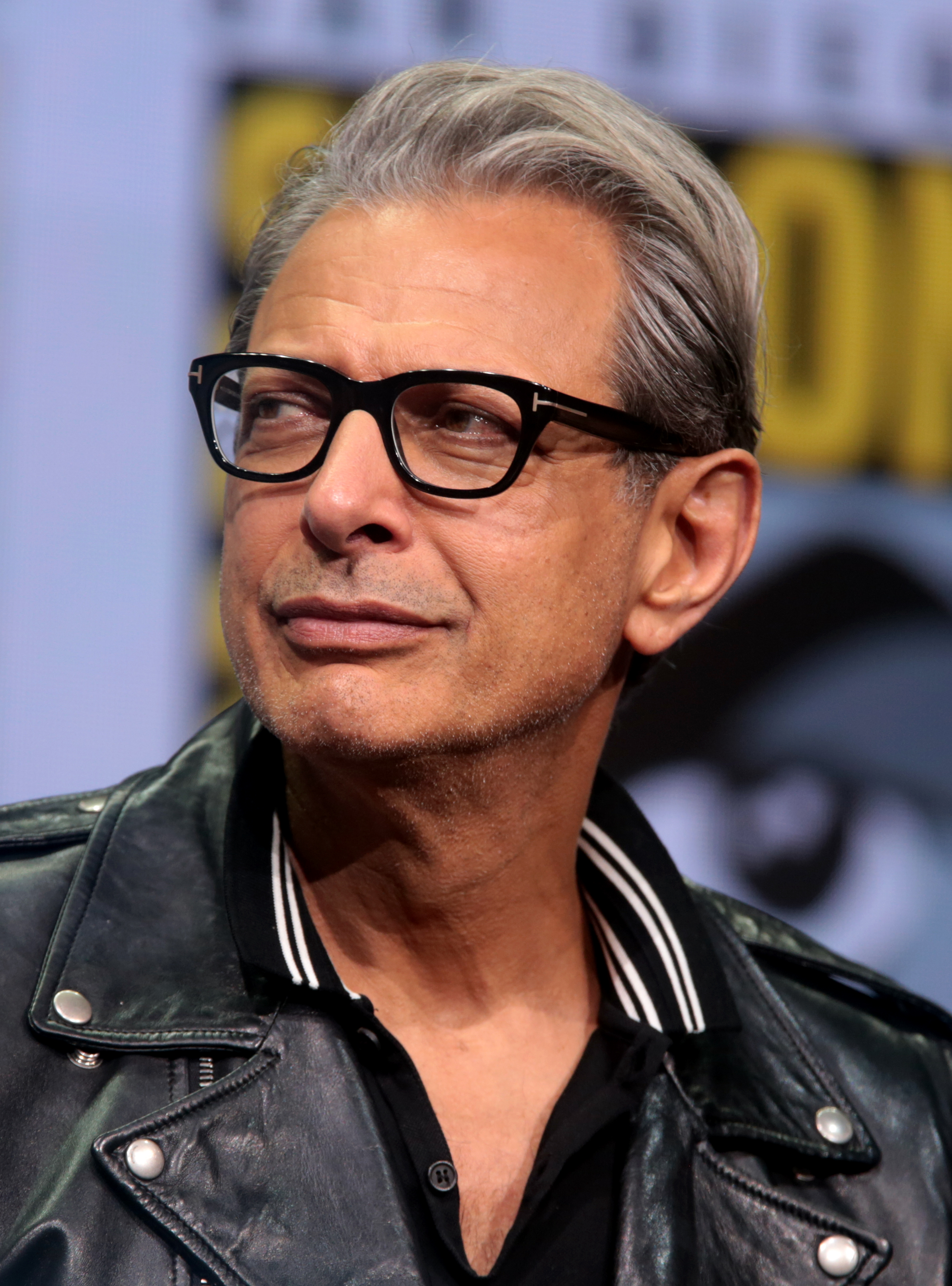
Jeff Goldblum, Best Actor winner

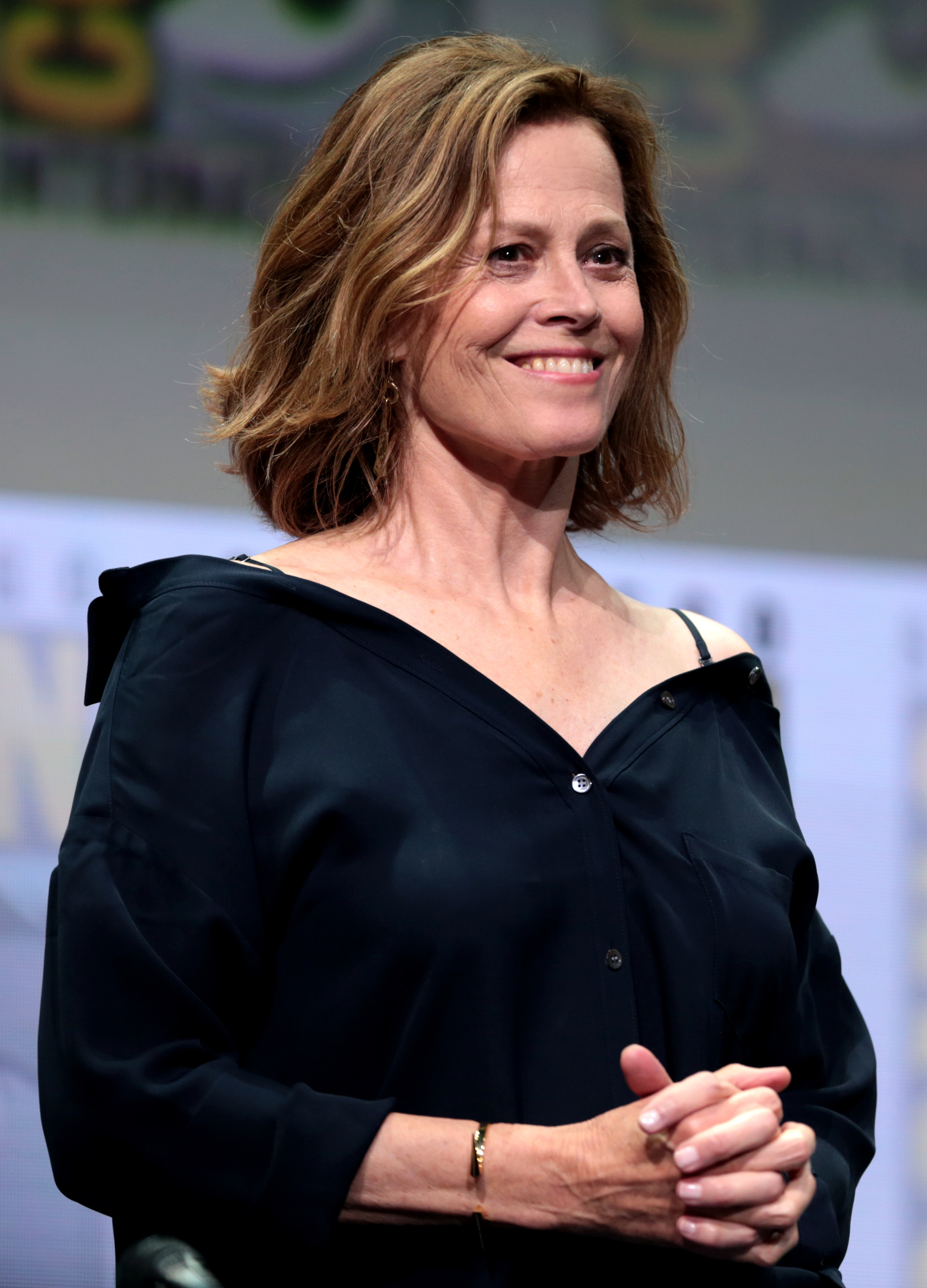
Sigourney Weaver, Best Actress winner

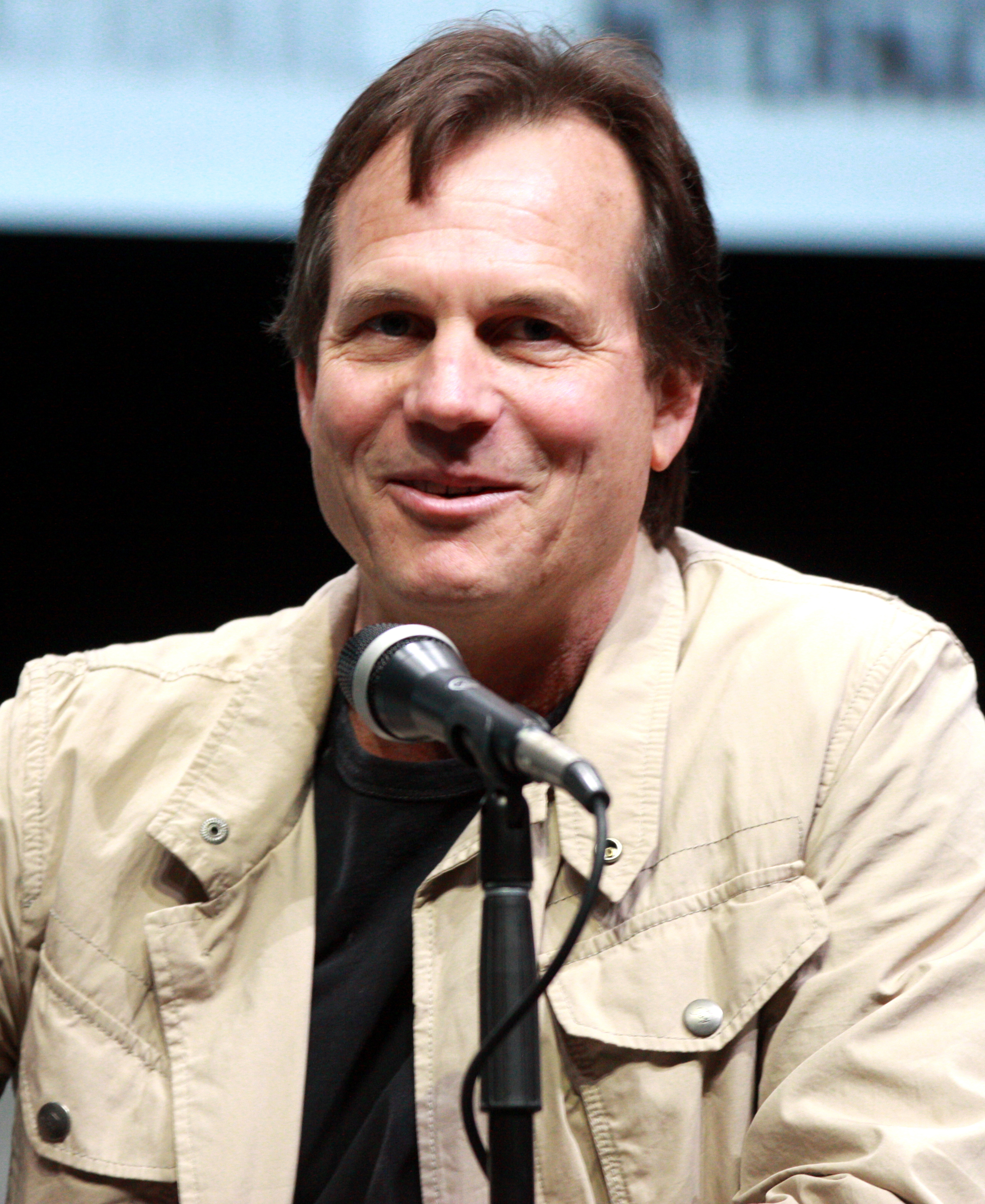
Bill Paxton, Best Supporting Actor winner

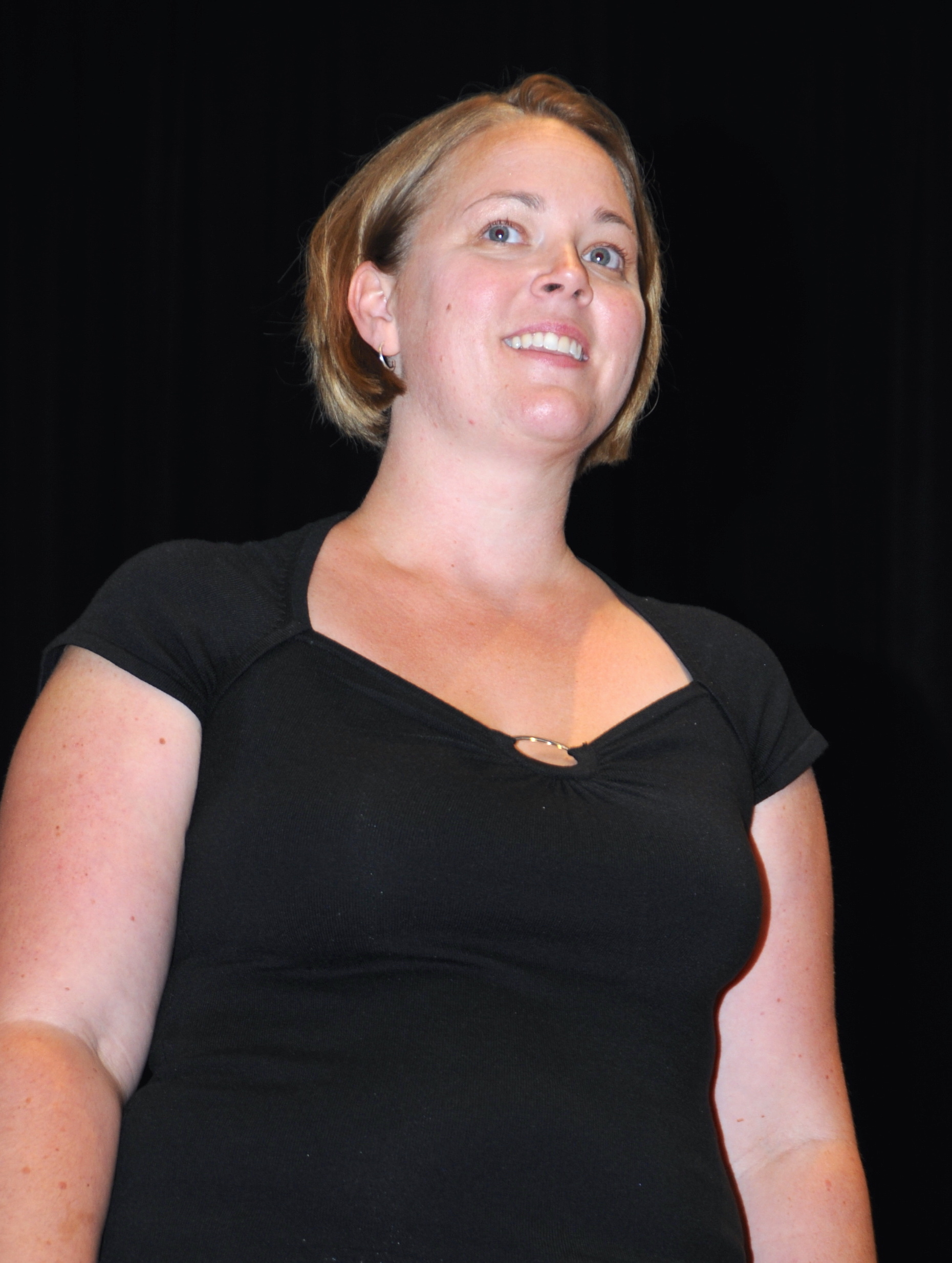
Carrie Henn, Best Performance by a Younger Actor winner

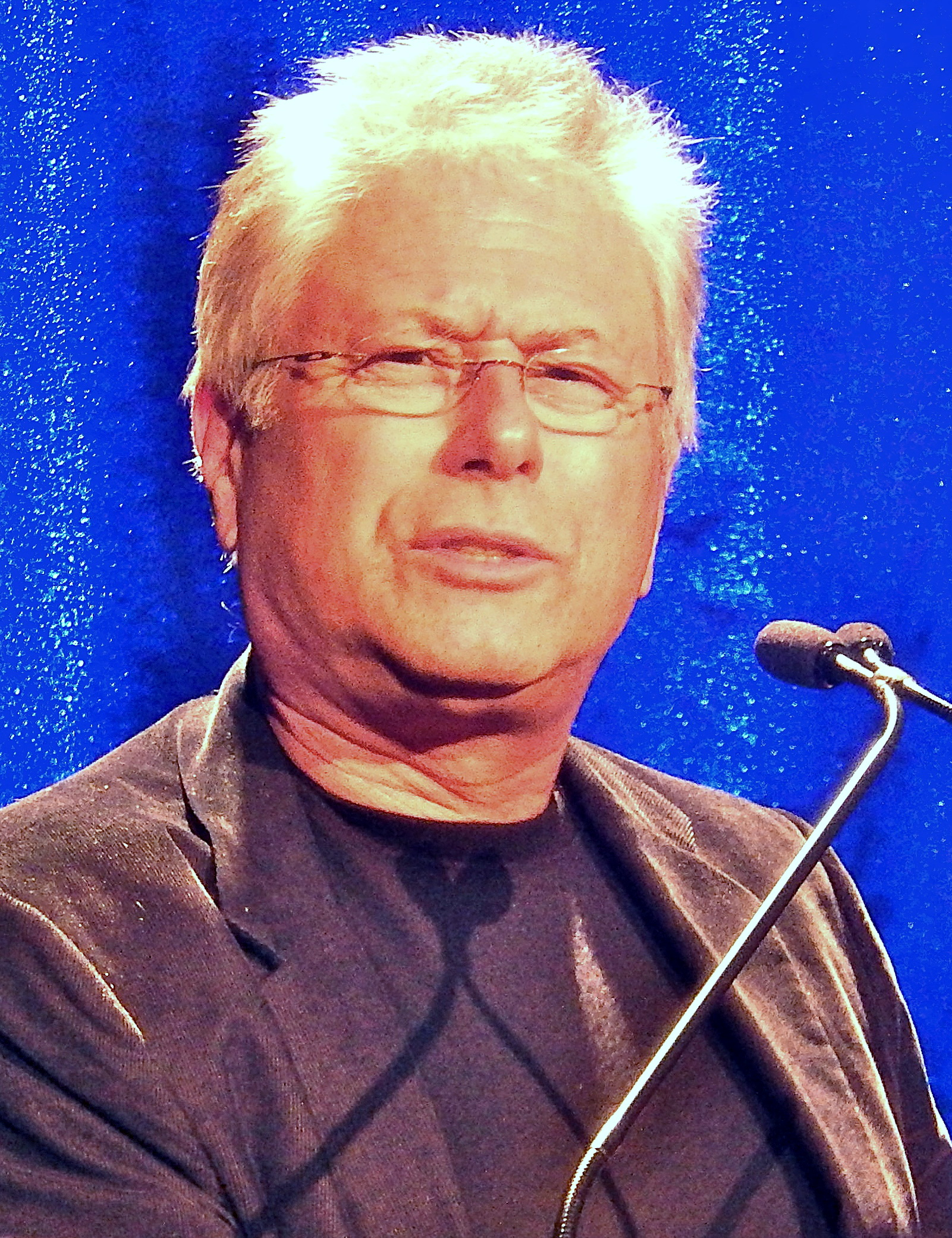
Alan Menken, Best Music winner

=== Film awards ===
Best Science Fiction Film	Best Fantasy Film
**Aliens**; Flight of the Navigator; Peggy Sue Got Married; Short Circuit; Star Trek IV: The Voyage Home	**The Boy Who Could Fly**; An American Tail; "Crocodile" Dundee; The Golden Child; Labyrinth
Best Horror Film	Best Director
**The Fly**; From Beyond; Little Shop of Horrors; Poltergeist II: The Other Side; Psycho III	**James Cameron – Aliens**; Randal Kleiser – Flight of the Navigator; David Cronenberg – The Fly; John Badham – Short Circuit; Leonard Nimoy – Star Trek IV: The Voyage Home
Best Actor	Best Actress
**Jeff Goldblum – The Fly as Dr. Seth Brundle**; Michael Biehn – Aliens as Corporal Dwayne Hicks; Leonard Nimoy – Star Trek IV: The Voyage Home as Spock; Anthony Perkins – Psycho III as Norman Bates; William Shatner – Star Trek IV: The Voyage Home as James T. Kirk	**Sigourney Weaver – Aliens as Ellen Ripley**; Barbara Crampton – From Beyond as Dr. Katherine McMichaels; Geena Davis – The Fly as Veronica Quaife; Elisabeth Shue – Link as Jane Chase; Kathleen Turner – Peggy Sue Got Married as Peggy Sue
Best Supporting Actor	Best Supporting Actress
**Bill Paxton – Aliens as Private Hudson**; James Doohan – Star Trek IV: The Voyage Home as Scotty; Clu Gulager – Hunter's Blood as Mason Rand; Walter Koenig – Star Trek IV: The Voyage Home as Pavel Chekov; Richard Moll – House as Big Ben	**Jenette Goldstein – Aliens as Private Vasquez**; Catherine Hicks – Star Trek IV: The Voyage Home as Dr. Gillian Taylor; Grace Jones – Vamp as Katrina; Kay Lenz – House as Sandy Sinclair; Vanity – 52 Pick-Up as Doreen
Best Performance by a Younger Actor	Best Writing
**Carrie Henn – Aliens as Rebecca "Newt" Jorden**; Joey Cramer – Flight of the Navigator as David Freeman; Lucy Deakins – The Boy Who Could Fly as Amelia "Milly" Michaelson; Scott Grimes – Critters as Brad Brown; Jay Underwood – The Boy Who Could Fly as Eric Gibb	**James Cameron – Aliens**; Nick Castle – The Boy Who Could Fly; Paul Hogan, Ken Shadie, and John Cornell – "Crocodile" Dundee; Howard Ashman – Little Shop of Horrors; Steve Meerson, Peter Krikes, Harve Bennett, and Nicholas Meyer – Star Trek IV: The Voyage Home
Best Music	Best Costumes
**Alan Menken – Little Shop of Horrors**; James Horner – An American Tail; John Carpenter – Big Trouble in Little China; Howard Shore – The Fly; Jerry Goldsmith – Link	**Robert Fletcher – Star Trek IV: The Voyage Home**; Emma Porteous – Aliens; Brian Froud and Ellis Flyte – Labyrinth; Marit Allen – Little Shop of Horrors; Theadora Van Runkle – Peggy Sue Got Married
Best Make-up	Best Special Effects
**Chris Walas – The Fly**; Peter Robb-King – Aliens; John Carl Buechler, John Naulin, Anthony Doublin, and Mark Shostrom – From Beyond; Rob Bottin – Legend; Wes Dawn, Jeff Dawn, and James Lee McCoy – Star Trek IV: The Voyage Home	**Stan Winston, Robert Skotak, and Dennis Skotak** **(The L.A. Effects Group) – Aliens**; Lyle Conway – Little Shop of Horrors; Richard Edlund – Poltergeist II: The Other Side; Syd Mead and Eric Allard – Short Circuit; Ken Ralston and Michael Lantieri – Star Trek IV: The Voyage Home

=== Special awards ===
==== George Pal Memorial Award ====
- Arnold Leibovit

==== Life Career Award ====
- Leonard Nimoy

==== President's Award ====
- Joseph Stefano
- Marshall Brickman – The Manhattan Project
