= 12th Saturn Awards =

US film and television award ceremony

- Date: June 9, 1985
- Site: California, U.S.

Highlights
- Most awards: Gremlins (5)
- Most nominations: Gremlins (9)

The 12th Saturn Awards, honoring the best in science fiction, fantasy and horror film in 1984, were held on June 9, 1985.

== Winners and nominees ==
Below is a complete list of nominees and winners. Winners are highlighted in bold.

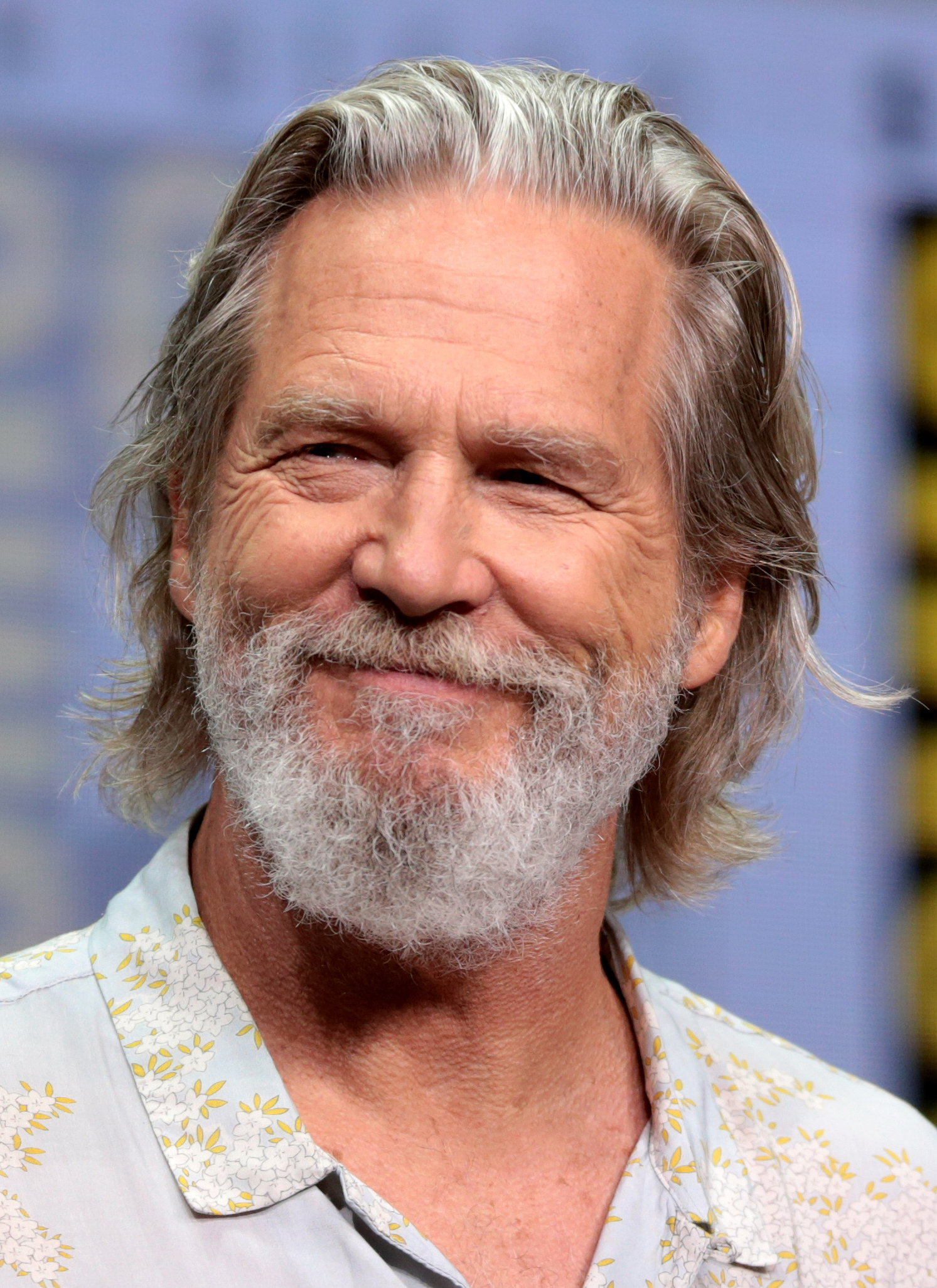
Jeff Bridges, Best Actor winner.

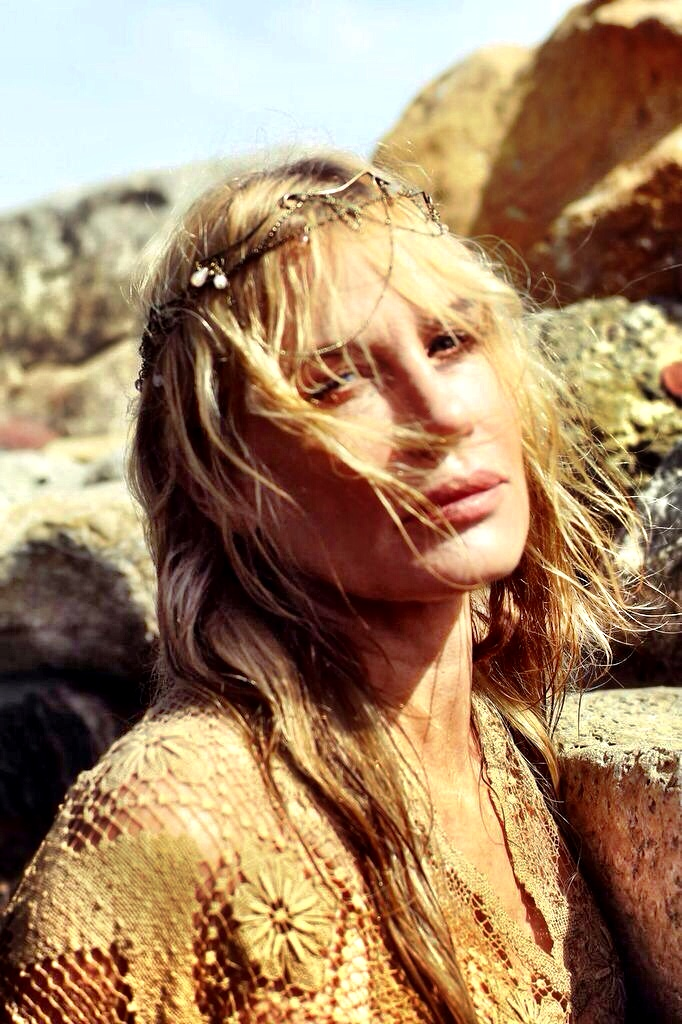
Daryl Hannah, Best Actress winner.

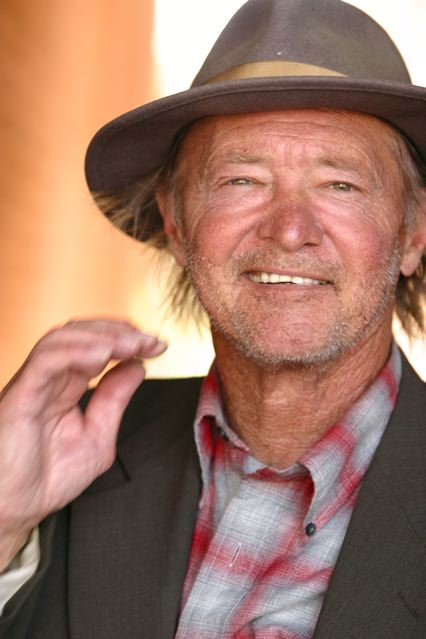
Tracey Walter, Best Supporting Actor winner.

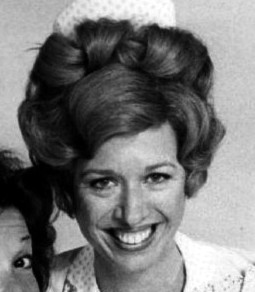
Polly Holliday, Best Supporting Actress winner.

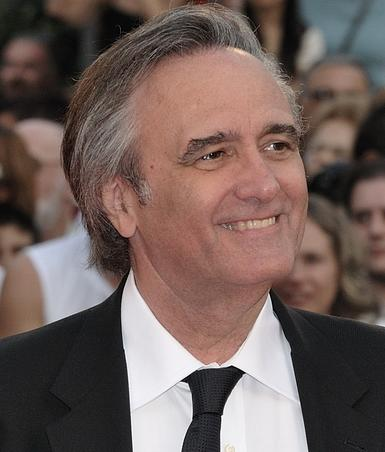
Joe Dante, Best Director winner.

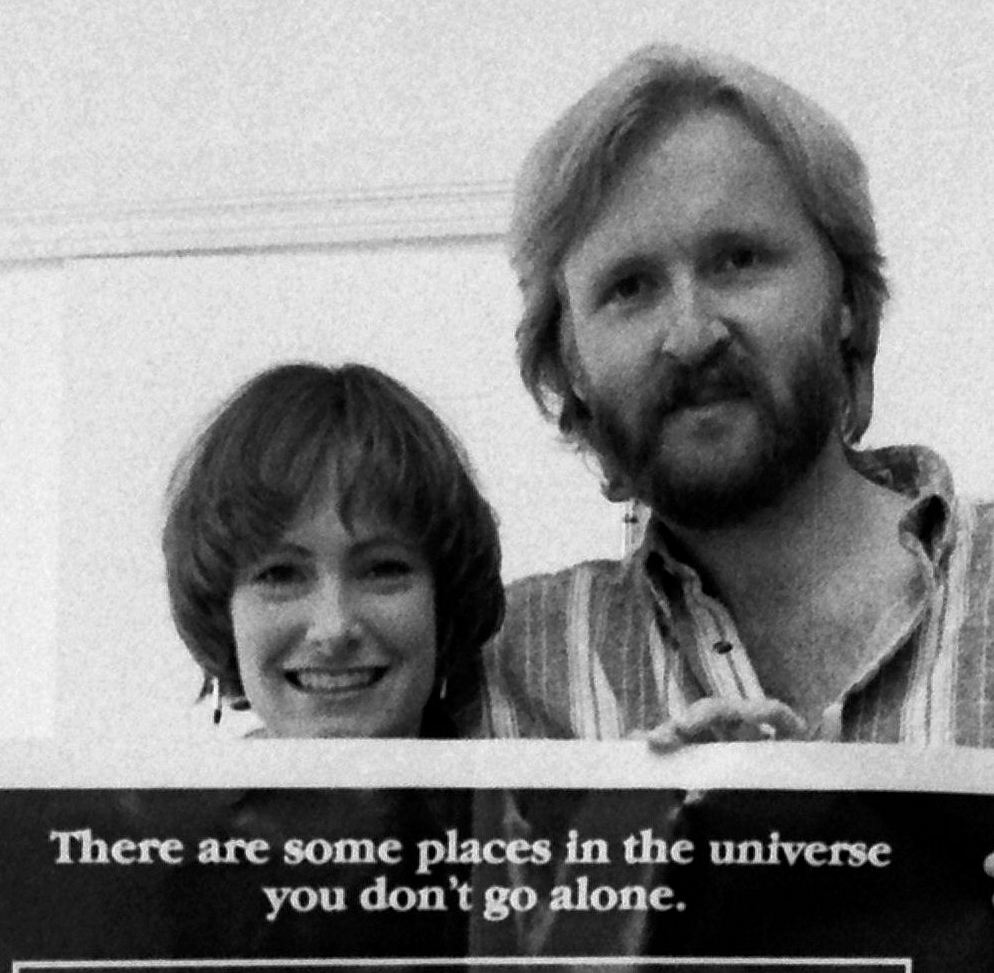
James Cameron and Gale Anne Hurd, Best Writing winners.

=== Film awards ===
Best Science Fiction Film	Best Fantasy Film
**The Terminator**; 2010: The Year We Make Contact; Dune; Starman; Star Trek III: The Search for Spock	**Ghostbusters**; Greystoke: The Legend of Tarzan, Lord of the Apes; Indiana Jones and the Temple of Doom; The NeverEnding Story; Splash
Best Horror Film	Best Performance by a Younger Actor
**Gremlins**; Creature; Dreamscape; Firestarter; A Nightmare on Elm Street	**Noah Hathaway – The NeverEnding Story** as Atreyu; Drew Barrymore – Firestarter as Charlie McGee; Corey Feldman – Gremlins as Pete Fountaine; Jsu Garcia – A Nightmare on Elm Street as Rod Lane; Ke Huy Quan – Indiana Jones and the Temple of Doom as Short Round
Best Actor	Best Actress
**Jeff Bridges – Starman** as Starman; George Burns – Oh, God! You Devil as God / Harry O. Tophet; Harrison Ford – Indiana Jones and the Temple of Doom as Indiana Jones; Arnold Schwarzenegger – The Terminator as Terminator; William Shatner – Star Trek III: The Search for Spock as James T. Kirk	**Daryl Hannah – Splash** as Madison; Karen Allen – Starman as Jenny Hayden; Nancy Allen – The Philadelphia Experiment as Allison Hayes; Linda Hamilton – The Terminator as Sarah Connor; Helen Slater – Supergirl as Supergirl / Linda Lee
Best Supporting Actor	Best Supporting Actress
**Tracey Walter – Repo Man** as Miller; John Candy – Splash as Freddie Bauer; John Lithgow – The Adventures of Buckaroo Banzai Across the 8th Dimension as Lord John Whorfin / Dr. Emilio Lizardo; Dick Miller – Gremlins as Murray Futterman; Robert Preston – The Last Starfighter as Centauri	**Polly Holliday – Gremlins** as Ruby Deagle; Kirstie Alley – Runaway as Jackie Rogers; Judith Anderson – Star Trek III: The Search for Spock as Vulcan High Priestess; Grace Jones – Conan the Destroyer as Zula; Mary Woronov – Night of the Comet as Audrey White
Best Director	Best Writing
**Joe Dante – Gremlins**; James Cameron – The Terminator; Ron Howard – Splash; Leonard Nimoy – Star Trek III: The Search for Spock; Steven Spielberg – Indiana Jones and the Temple of Doom	**James Cameron and Gale Anne Hurd – The Terminator**; Earl Mac Rauch – The Adventures of Buckaroo Banzai Across the 8th Dimension; Chris Columbus – Gremlins; Willard Huyck and Gloria Katz – Indiana Jones and the Temple of Doom; Alex Cox – Repo Man
Best Music	Best Costumes
**Jerry Goldsmith – Gremlins**; Ralph Burns – The Muppets Take Manhattan; Giorgio Moroder and Klaus Doldinger – The NeverEnding Story; Michel Colombier – Purple Rain; Brad Fiedel – The Terminator	**Bob Ringwood – Dune**; Patricia Norris – 2010: The Year We Make Contact; John Mollo – Greystoke: The Legend of Tarzan, Lord of the Apes; Anthony Powell – Indiana Jones and the Temple of Doom; Robert Fletcher – Star Trek III: The Search for Spock
Best Make-up	Best Special Effects
**Stan Winston – The Terminator**; Giannetto De Rossi – Dune; Greg LaCava – Gremlins; Tom Smith – Indiana Jones and the Temple of Doom; Robert J. Schiffer – Splash	**Chris Walas – Gremlins**; Richard Edlund – 2010: The Year We Make Contact; Lawrence E. Benson – Creature; Barry Nolan – Dune; Ralph Winter – Star Trek III: The Search for Spock

=== Special awards ===
==== George Pal Memorial Award ====
- Douglas Trumbull

==== President's Award ====
- Jack Arnold
