= 21st Saturn Awards =

1994 film and television awards

- Date: June 26, 1995
- Site: California, U.S.

Highlights
- Most awards: Ed Wood (3); Interview with the Vampire (3); True Lies (3)
- Most nominations: Interview with the Vampire (8)

The 21st Saturn Awards, honoring the best in science fiction, fantasy and horror film and television in 1994, were held on June 26, 1995.

== Winners and nominees ==
Below is a complete list of nominees and winners. Winners are highlighted in boldface.

=== Film ===
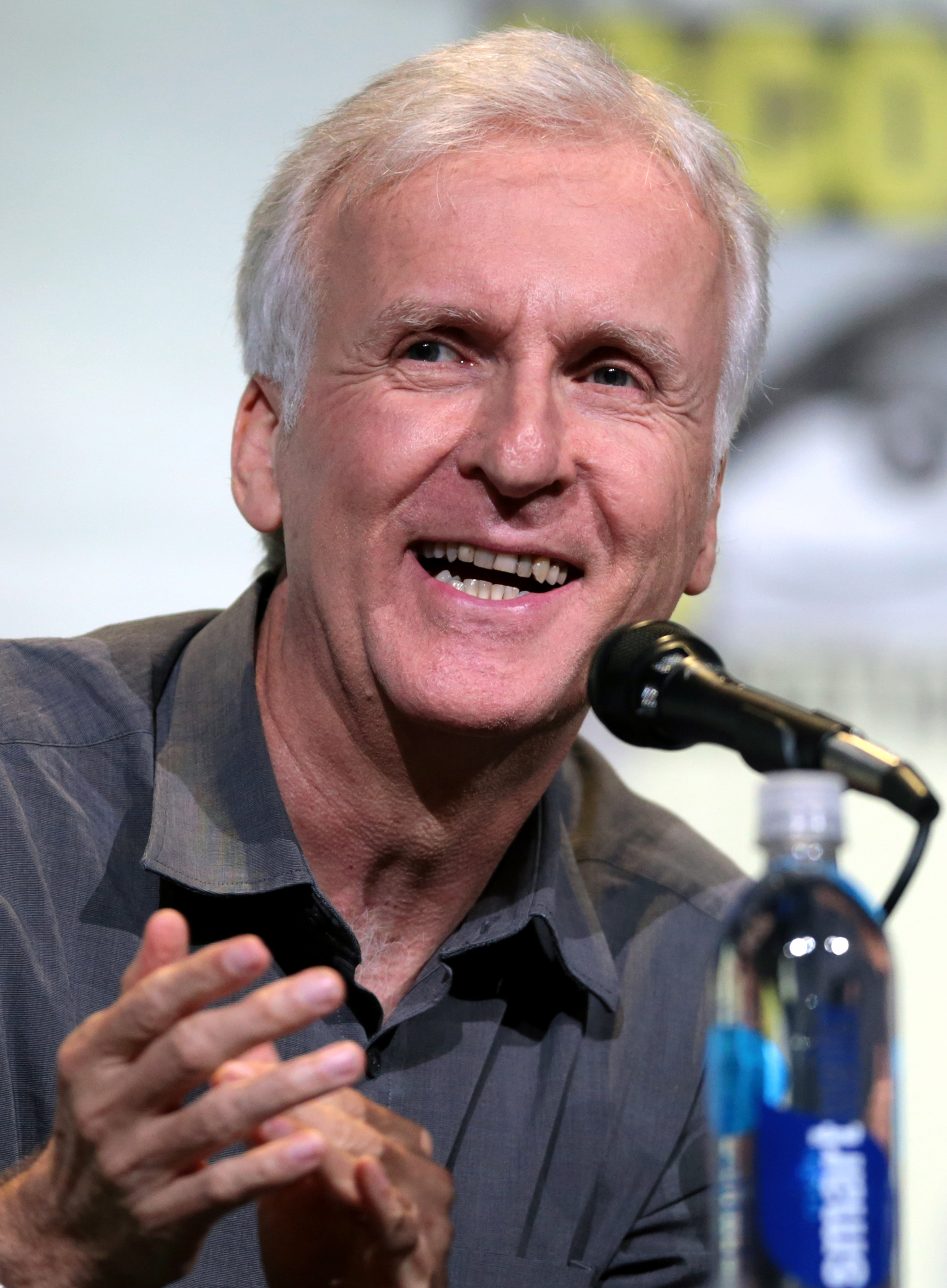
James Cameron, Best Director winner

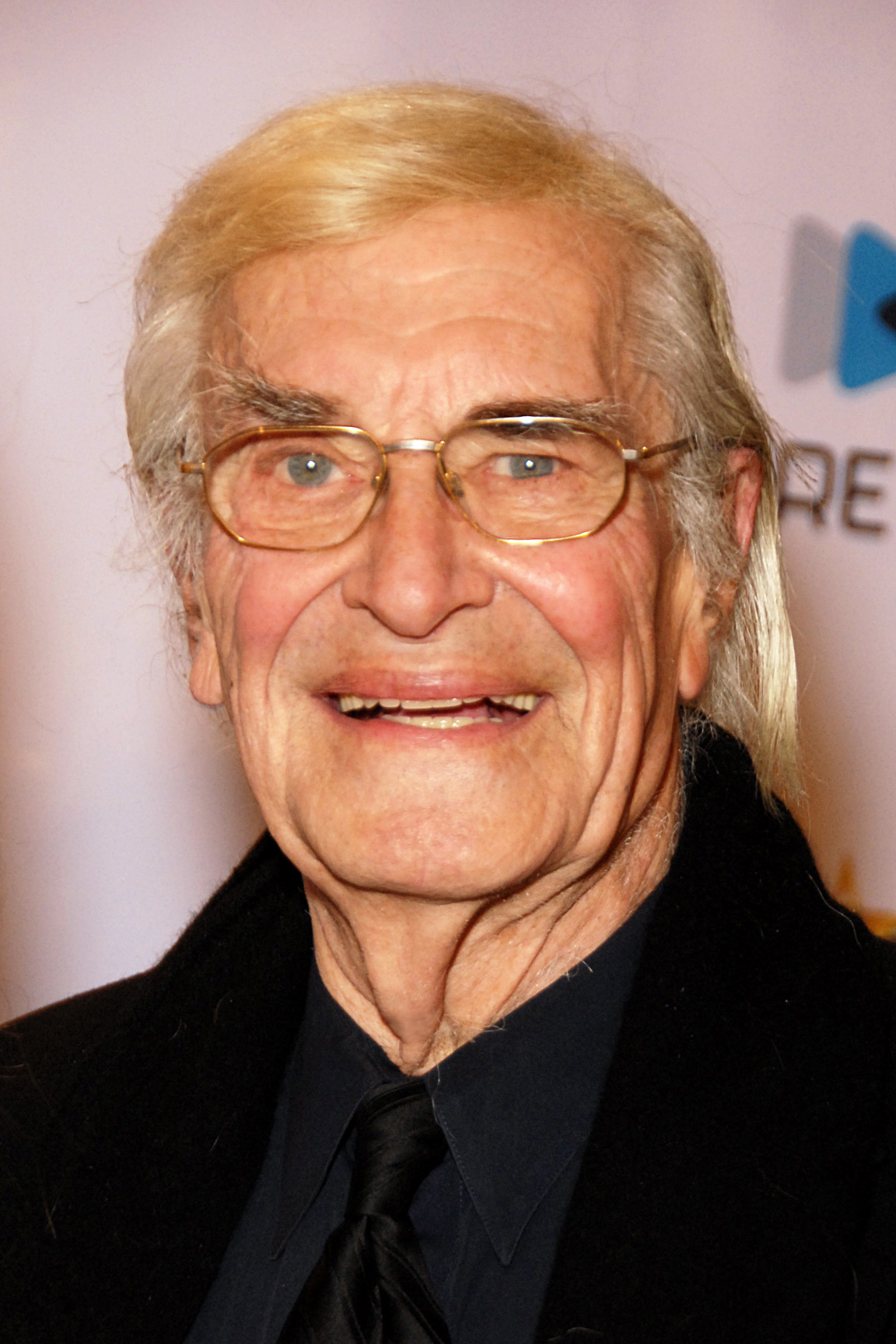
Martin Landau, Best Actor winner

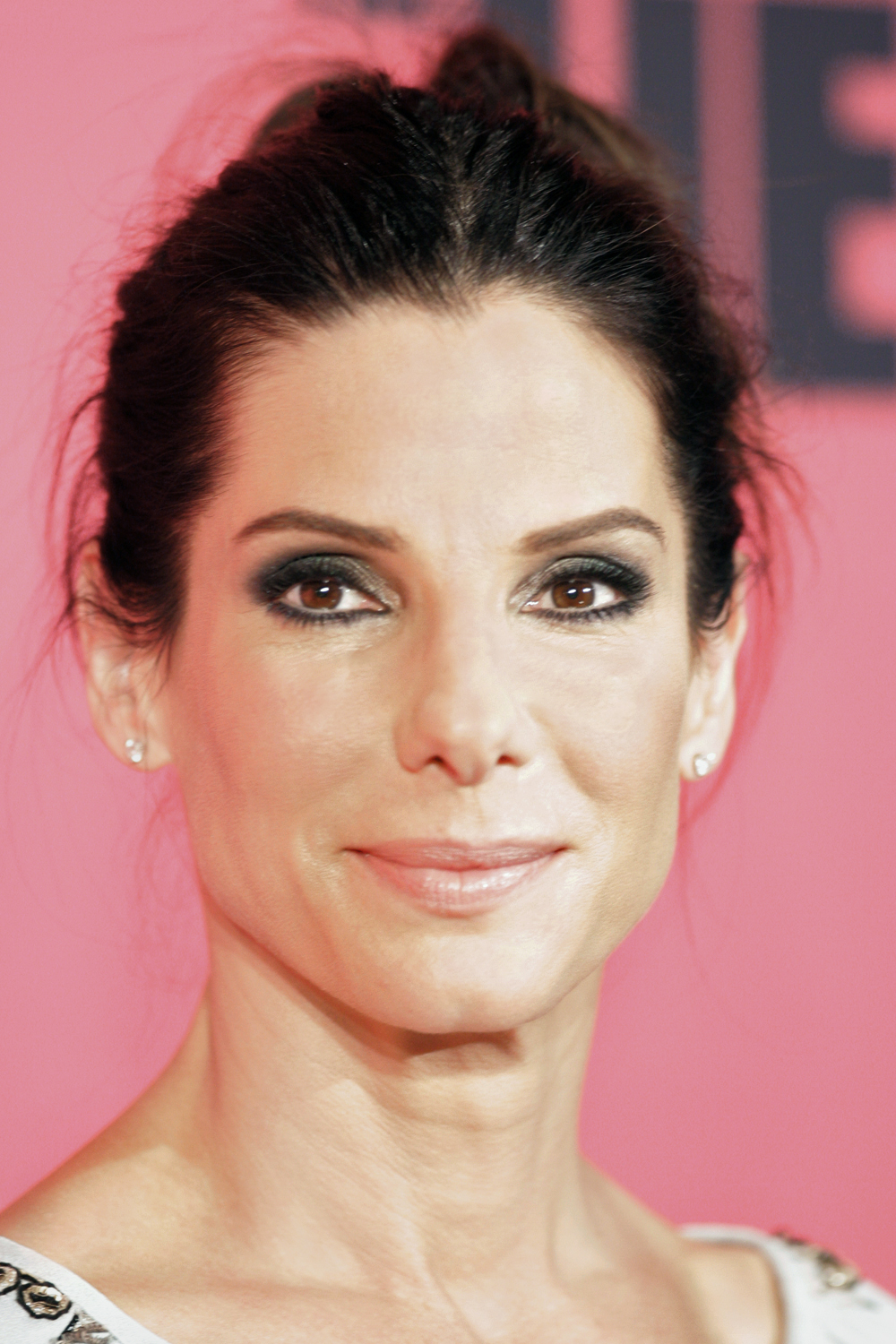
Sandra Bullock, Best Actress co-winner

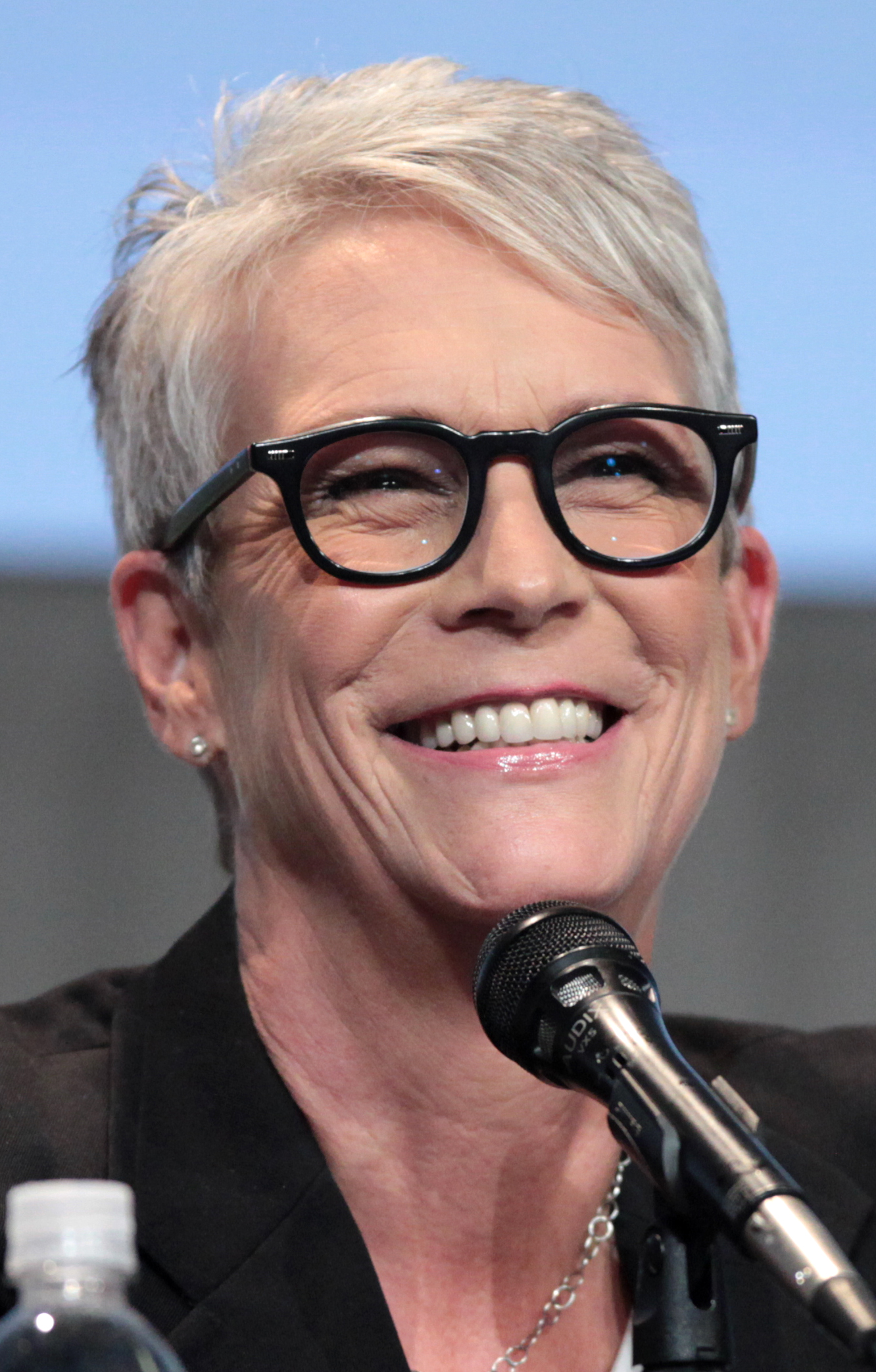
Jamie Lee Curtis, Best Actress co-winner

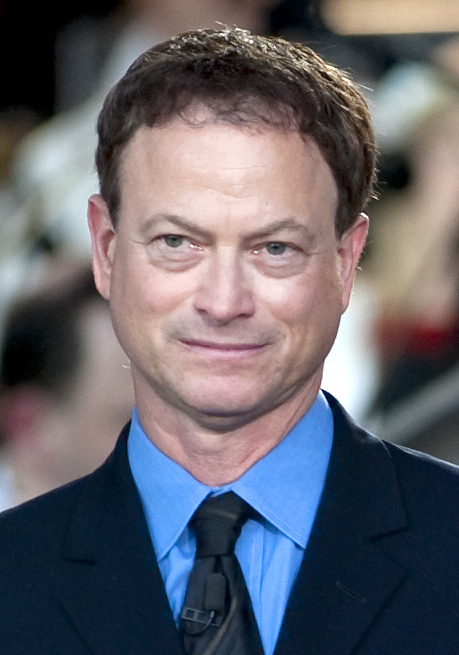
Gary Sinise, Best Supporting Actor winner

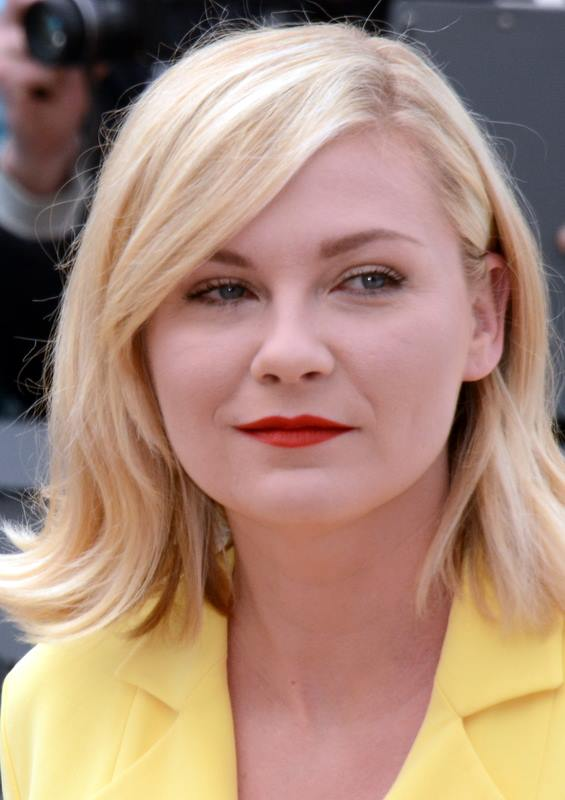
Kirsten Dunst, Best Performance by a Younger Actor winner

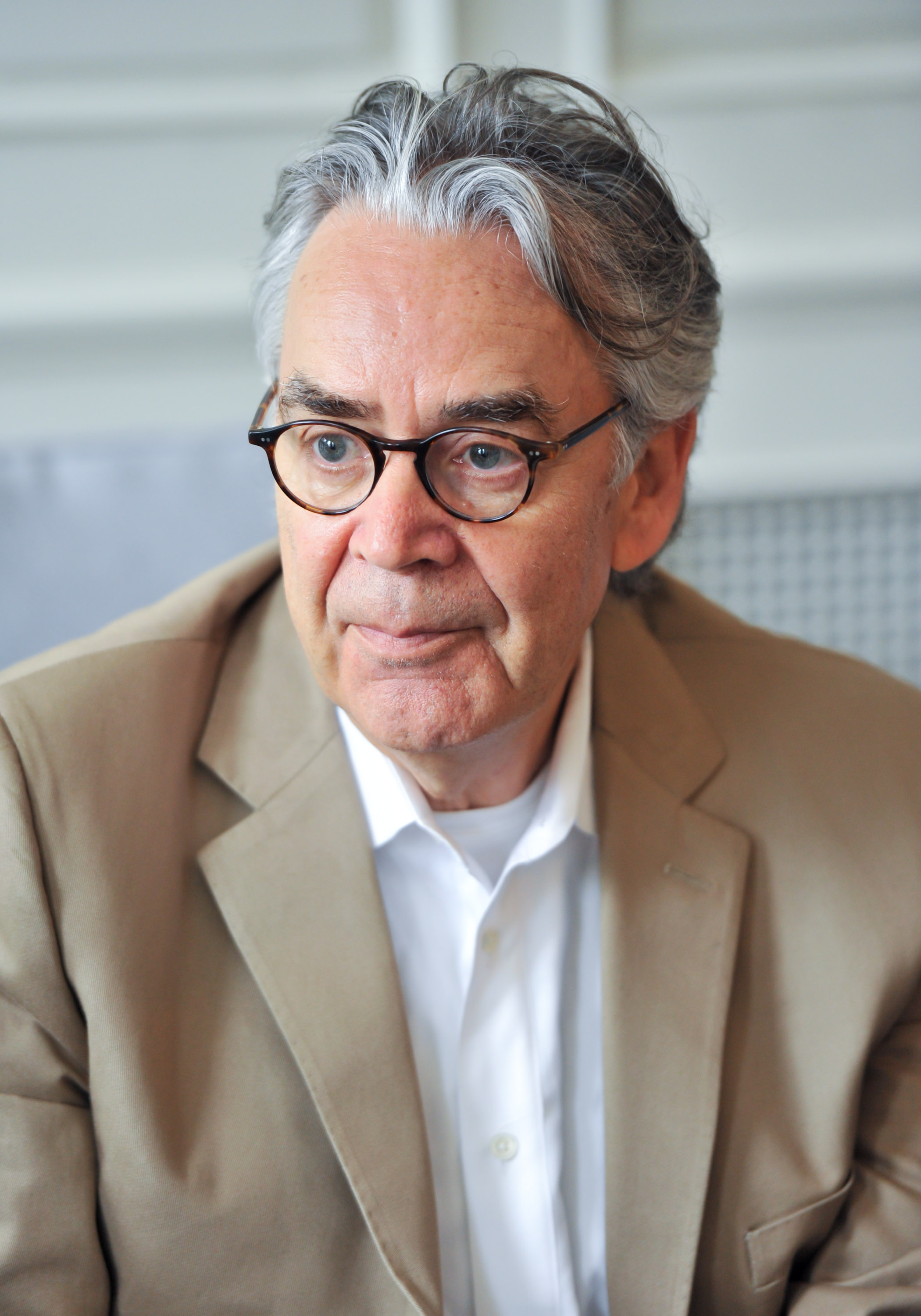
Howard Shore, Best Music winner

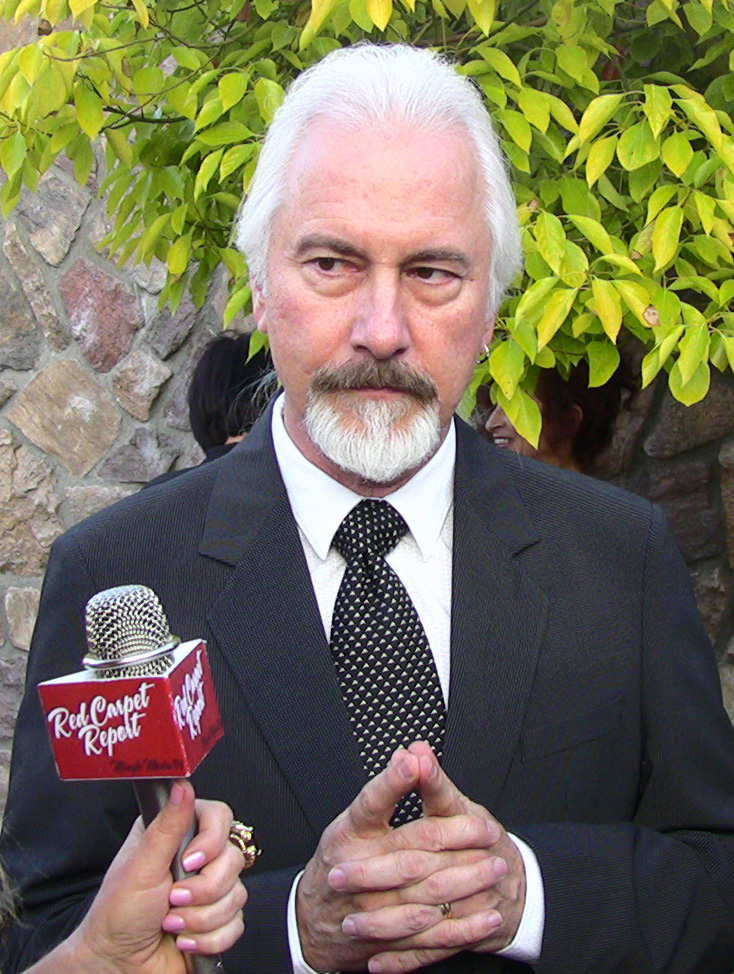
Rick Baker, Best Make-up co-winner

Best Science Fiction Film	Best Fantasy Film
**Stargate**; Body Snatchers; No Escape; The Puppet Masters; Star Trek Generations; Street Fighter; Timecop	**Forrest Gump**; Angels in the Outfield; Ed Wood; The Flintstones; The Lion King; The Mask; The Santa Clause
Best Horror Film	Best Action/Adventure/Thriller Film
**Interview with the Vampire**; Cronos; The Crow; Mary Shelley's Frankenstein; Mosquito; Wes Craven's New Nightmare; Wolf	**Pulp Fiction**; Clear and Present Danger; The Jungle Book; Red Rock West; The Shawshank Redemption; Speed; True Lies
Best Director	Best Writing
**James Cameron – True Lies**; William Dear – Angels in the Outfield; Jan de Bont – Speed; Neil Jordan – Interview with the Vampire; Alex Proyas – The Crow; Robert Zemeckis – Forrest Gump	**Jim Harrison and Wesley Strick – Wolf**; Scott Alexander and Larry Karaszewski – Ed Wood; Eric Roth – Forrest Gump; Steph Lady and Frank Darabont – Mary Shelley's Frankenstein; Frank Darabont – The Shawshank Redemption; Mark Verheiden – Timecop
Best Actor	Best Actress
**Martin Landau – Ed Wood as Bela Lugosi**; Kenneth Branagh – Mary Shelley's Frankenstein as Victor Frankenstein; Tom Cruise – Interview with the Vampire as Lestat de Lioncourt; Tom Hanks – Forrest Gump as Forrest Gump; Jack Nicholson – Wolf as Will Randall; Brad Pitt – Interview with the Vampire as Louis de Pointe du Lac; Arnold Schwarzenegger – True Lies as Harry Tasker	**Sandra Bullock – Speed as Annie Porter (TIE)**; **Jamie Lee Curtis – True Lies as Helen Tasker (TIE)**; Mädchen Amick – Dream Lover as Lena Mathers Reardon; Helena Bonham Carter – Mary Shelley's Frankenstein as Elizabeth; Penelope Ann Miller – The Shadow as Margo Lane; Michelle Pfeiffer – Wolf as Laura Alden
Best Supporting Actor	Best Supporting Actress
**Gary Sinise – Forrest Gump as Lieutenant Dan Taylor**; Richard Attenborough – Miracle on 34th Street as Kris Kringle; Robert De Niro – Mary Shelley's Frankenstein as Creature; Raul Julia – Street Fighter as M. Bison (posthumous); Bill Paxton – True Lies as Simon; James Spader – Wolf as Stewart Swinton	**Mia Sara – Timecop as Melissa Walker**; Halle Berry – The Flintstones as Miss Stone; Tia Carrere – True Lies as Juno Skinner; Whoopi Goldberg – Star Trek Generations as Guinan; Rosie O'Donnell – The Flintstones as Betty Rubble; Robin Wright – Forrest Gump as Jenny Curran
Best Performance by a Younger Actor	Best Music
**Kirsten Dunst – Interview with the Vampire as Claudia**; Luke Edwards – Little Big League as Billy Heywood; Joseph Gordon-Levitt – Angels in the Outfield as Roger Bomman; Miko Hughes – Wes Craven's New Nightmare as Dylan Porter; Jonathan Taylor Thomas – The Lion King as Young Simba; Elijah Wood – North as North	**Howard Shore – Ed Wood**; Alan Silvestri – Forrest Gump; Elliot Goldenthal – Interview with the Vampire; Patrick Doyle – Mary Shelley's Frankenstein; Jerry Goldsmith – The Shadow; J. Peter Robinson – Wes Craven's New Nightmare
Best Costumes	Best Make-up
**Sandy Powell – Interview with the Vampire**; Arianne Phillips – The Crow; Rosanna Norton – The Flintstones; Ha Nguyen – The Mask; Bob Ringwood – The Shadow; Joseph A. Porro – Stargate	**Rick Baker and Ve Neill – Ed Wood**; Stan Winston and Michèle Burke – Interview with the Vampire; Daniel Parker and Paul Engelen – Mary Shelley's Frankenstein; Greg Cannom – The Mask; Alec Gillis and Tom Woodruff Jr. – The Santa Clause; Rick Baker – Wolf
Best Special Effects
**John Bruno (Digital Domain) – True Lies**; Andrew Mason (International Creative Effects) – The Crow; Ken Ralston (Industrial Light & Magic) – Forrest Gump; (Illusion Arts Inc., Fantasy II Film Effects, Visual Concept Engineering (VCE)) – The Shadow; Jeffrey A. Okun and Patrick Tatopoulos – Stargate; Gregory L. McMurry – Timecop

=== Television ===
Best Genre Television Series	Best Single Genre Television Presentation
**The X-Files**; Earth 2; M.A.N.T.I.S.; seaQuest DSV; The Simpsons; Sliders; Star Trek: The Next Generation	**Alien Nation: Dark Horizon**; Fatherland; Hercules: The Legendary Journeys (for the film Hercules and the Circle of Fire); Roswell; The Stand; TekWar; Witch Hunt

=== Video ===
Best Genre Video Release
- **Cronos**
  - Body Melt
  - Jack Be Nimble
  - My Neighbor Totoro
  - Phantasm III: Lord of the Dead
  - Shrunken Heads
  - V

=== Special awards ===
Golden Scroll of Merit (Outstanding Achievement)

- Paul Bunnell – That Little Monster

George Pal Memorial Award

- Robert Zemeckis

Life Career Award

- Joel Silver
- Wes Craven

Lifetime Achievement Award

- Sean Connery

Posthumous Award

- Will Rogers

Special Award

- Richard Fleischer (for his career)

Service Award

- Forrest J Ackerman
