= 9th Saturn Awards =

US film and television awards ceremony

- Date: July 27, 1982
- Site: DGA Theater Complex, Los Angeles, California
- Hosted by: Sandahl Bergman; Richard Lynch

Highlights
- Most awards: Raiders of the Lost Ark (7)
- Most nominations: Raiders of the Lost Ark (9)

The 9th Saturn Awards, honoring the best in science fiction, fantasy and horror film in 1981, were held on July 27, 1982. It was hosted by Sandahl Bergman and Richard Lynch at the Director's Guild Theater Complex on Sunset Boulevard in Los Angeles, California.

== Winners and nominees ==
Below is a complete list of nominees and winners. Winners are highlighted in bold.

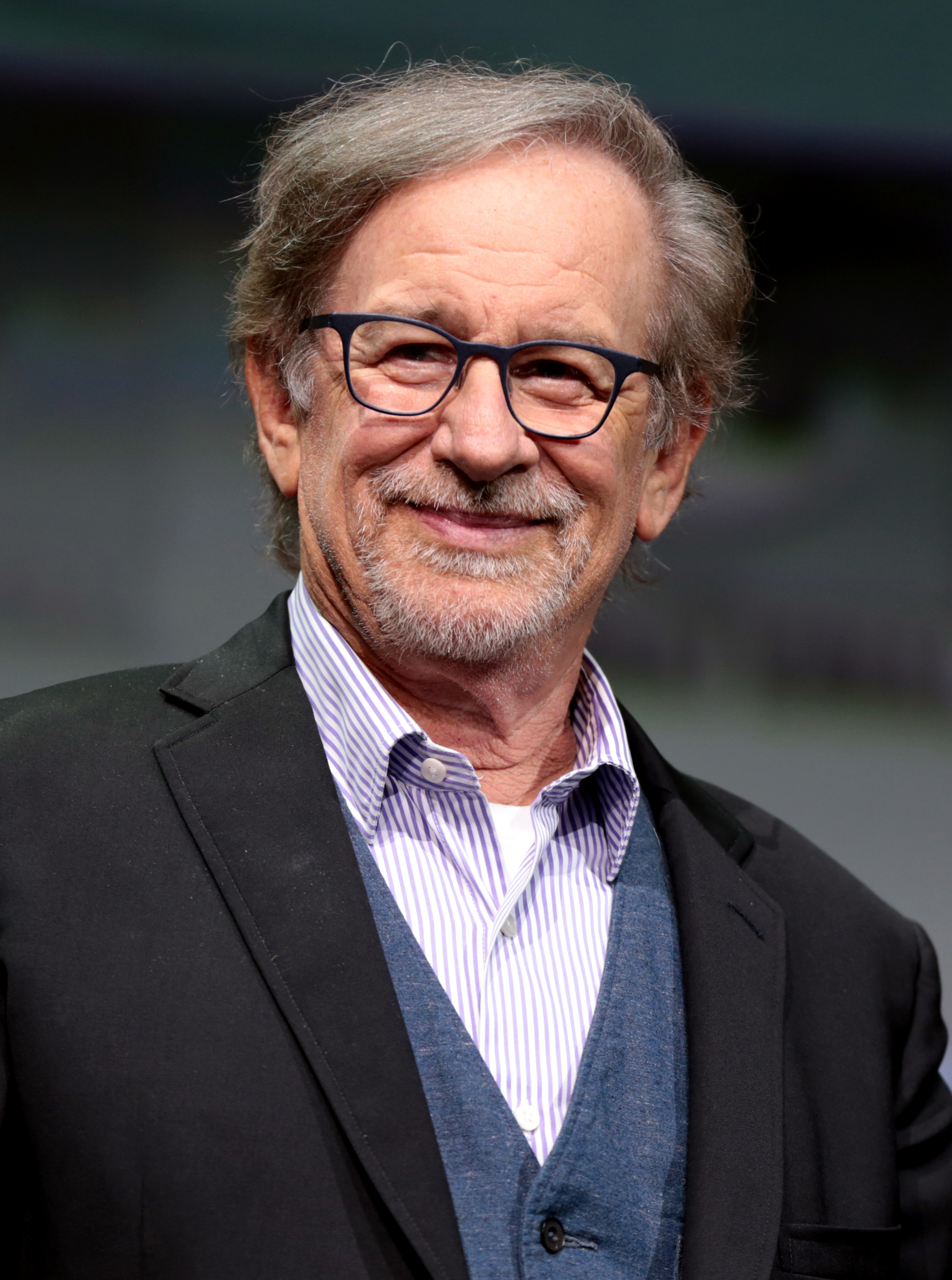
Steven Spielberg, Best Director winner

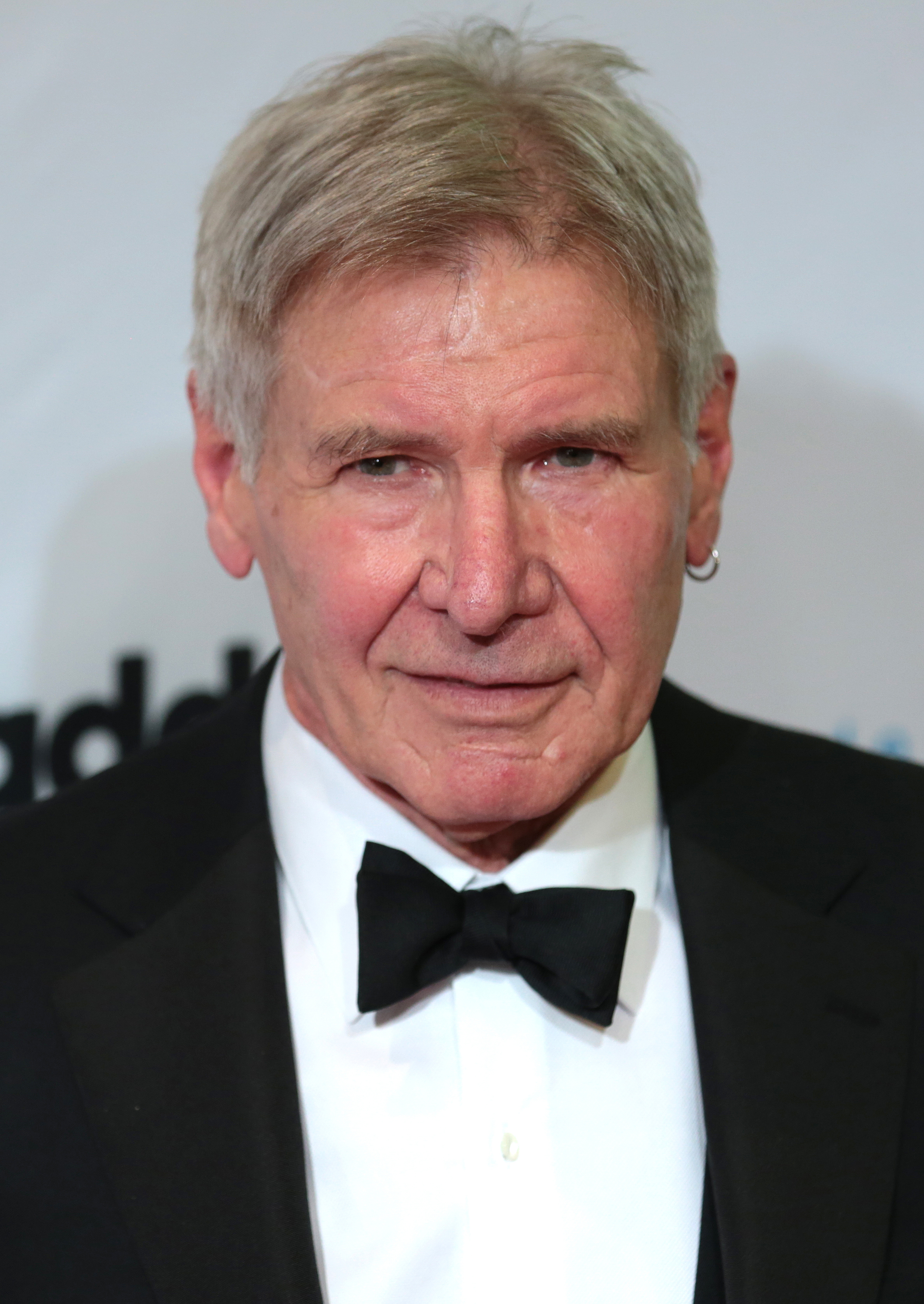
Harrison Ford, Best Actor winner

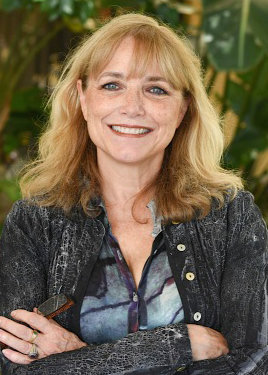
Karen Allen, Best Actress winner

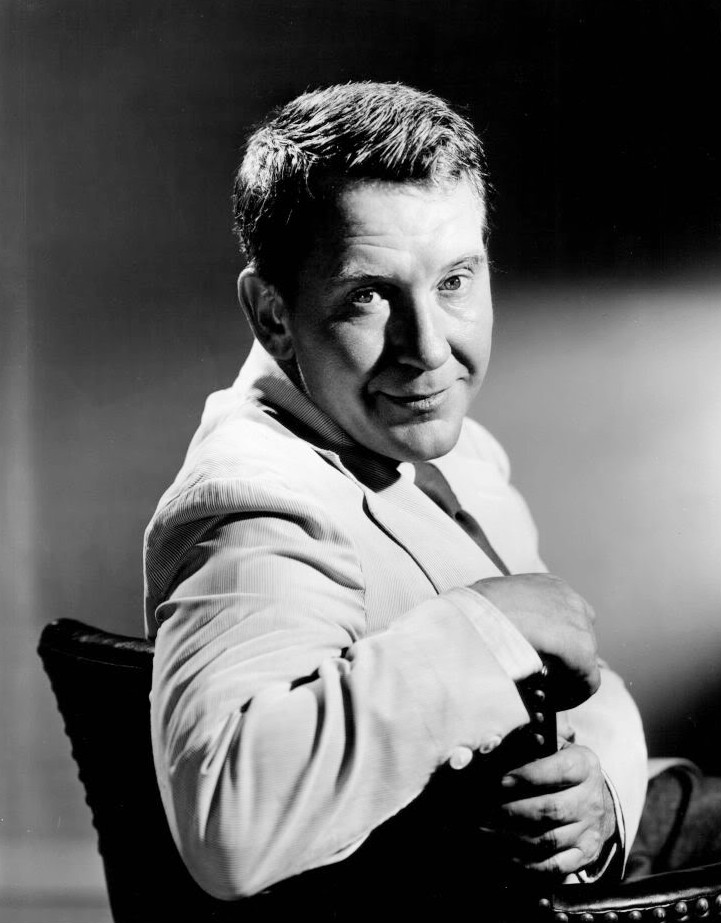
Burgess Meredith, Best Supporting Actor winner

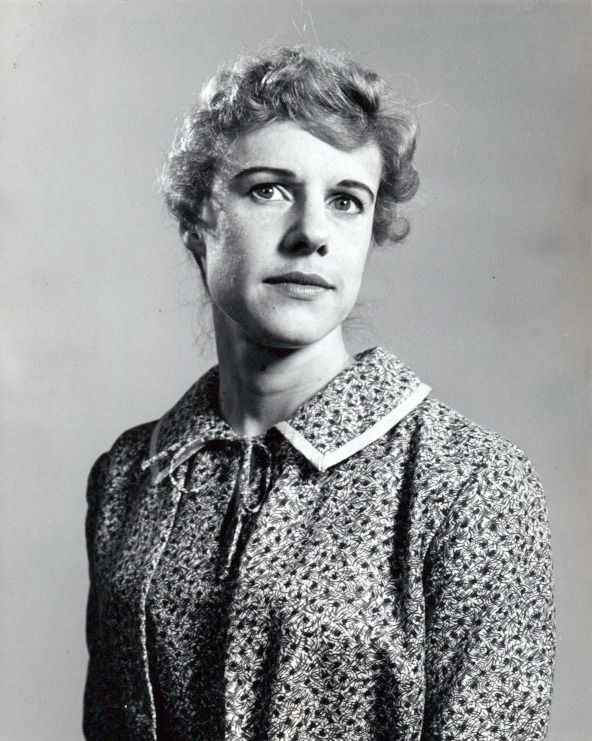
Frances Sternhagen, Best Supporting Actress winner

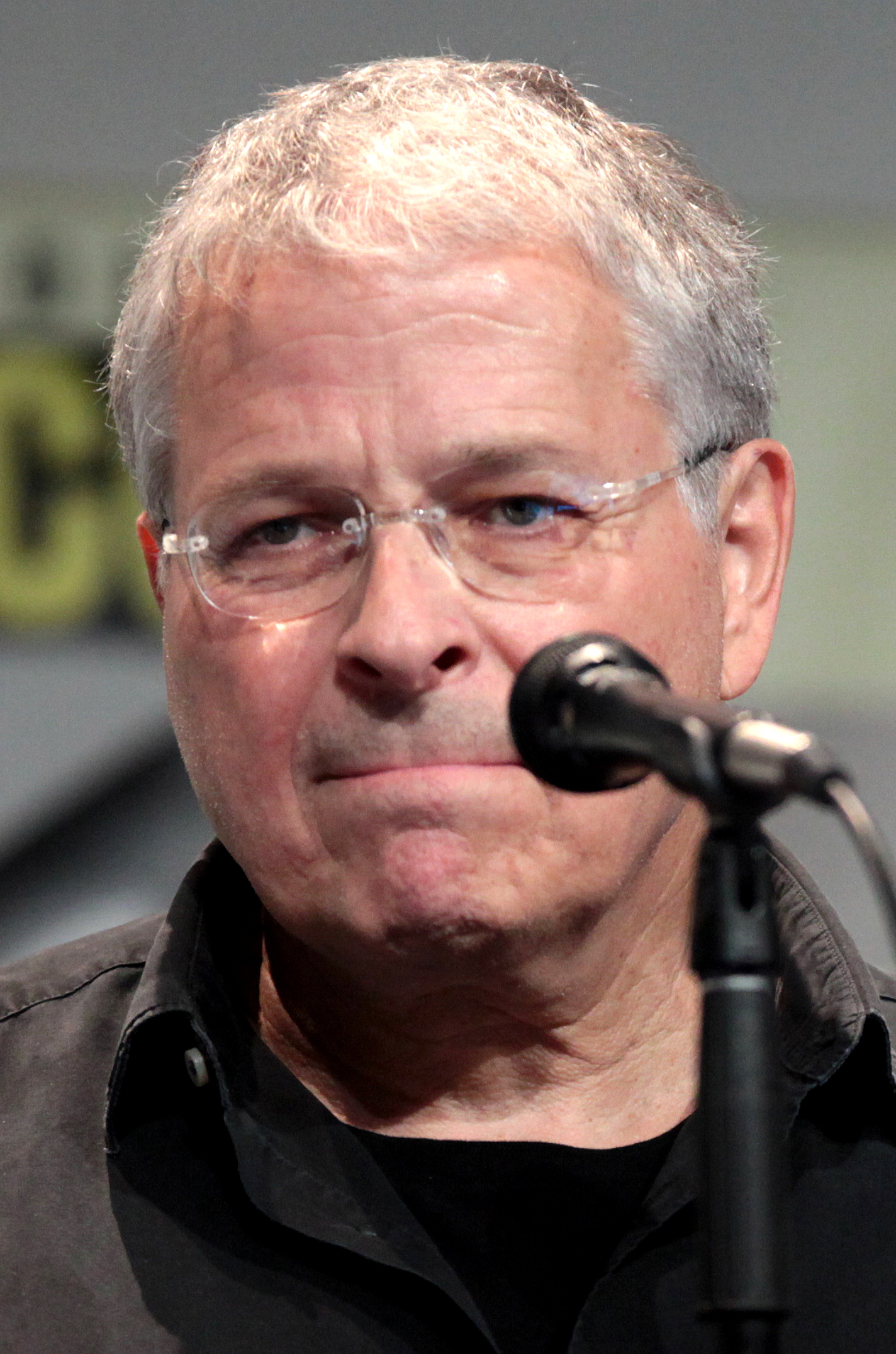
Lawrence Kasdan, Best Writing winner

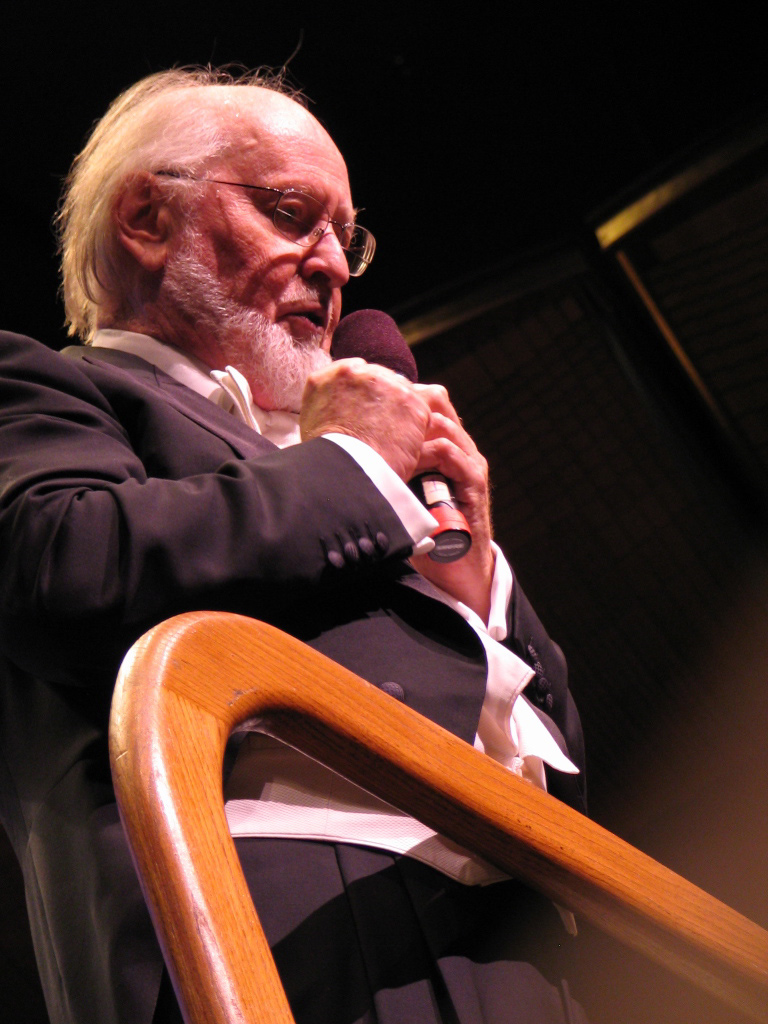
John Williams, Best Music winner

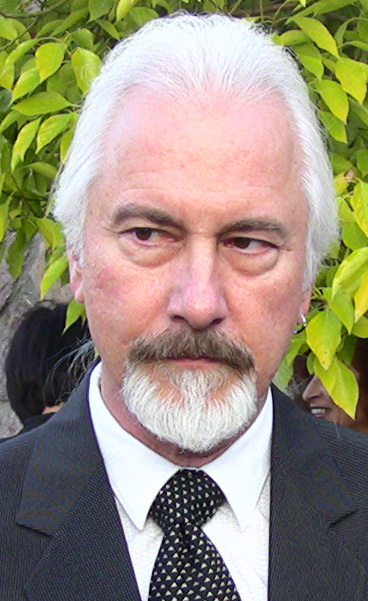
Rick Baker, Best Make-up winner

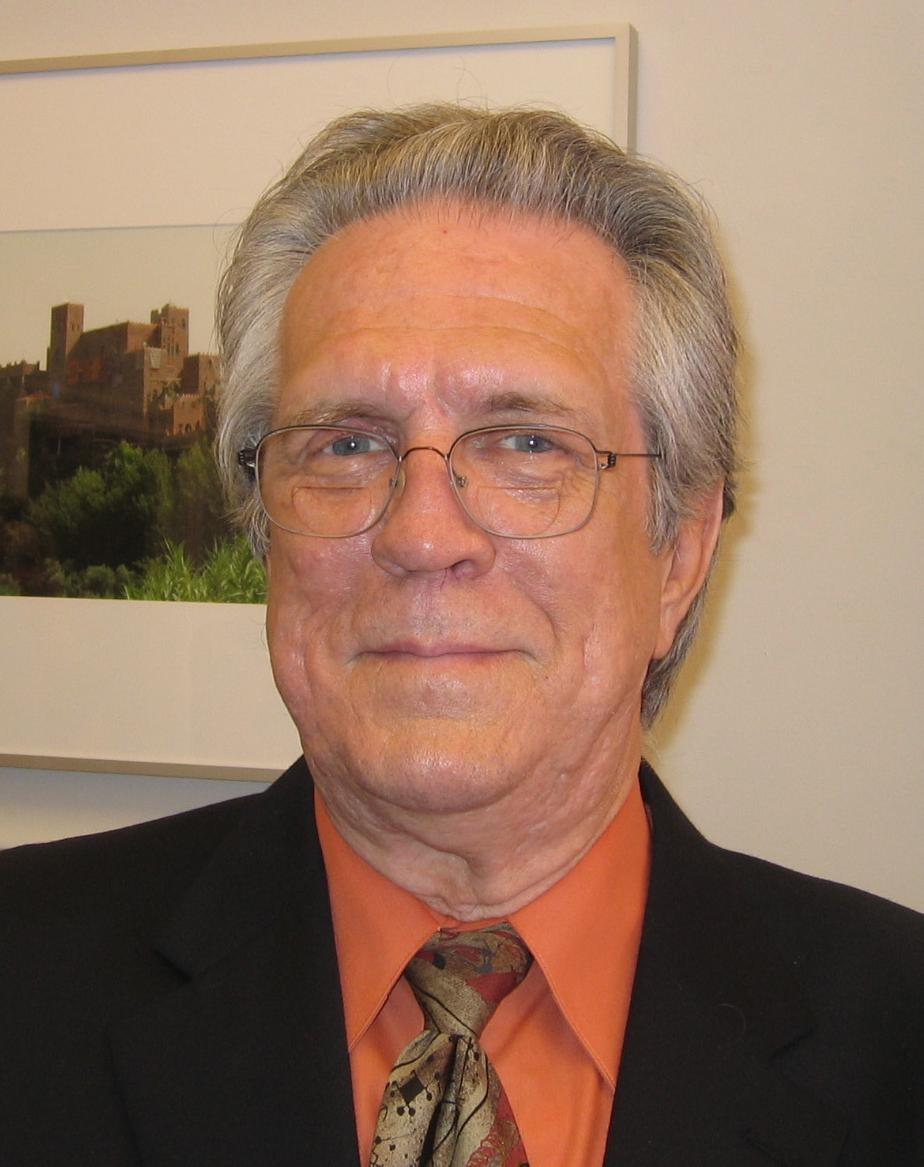
Richard Edlund, Best Special Effects winner

=== Film awards ===
Best Science Fiction Film	Best Fantasy Film
**Superman II**; Escape from New York; Heartbeeps; Heavy Metal; Outland	**Raiders of the Lost Ark**; Clash of the Titans; Dragonslayer; Excalibur; The Fox and the Hound
Best Horror Film	Best International Film
**An American Werewolf in London**; Dead & Buried; Ghost Story; Halloween II; Wolfen	**Quest for Fire**; Full Circle; Roadgames; Time Bandits; The Watcher in the Woods
Best Low-Budget Film	
**Fear No Evil**; Alice, Sweet Alice; Madman; Night Warning; The Unseen	
Best Actor	Best Actress
**Harrison Ford – Raiders of the Lost Ark as Indiana Jones**; Donald Pleasence – Halloween II as Dr. Sam Loomis; Sean Connery – Outland as Marshal William T. O'Niel; Christopher Reeve – Superman II as Clark Kent / Superman; Albert Finney – Wolfen as Det. Dewey Wilson	**Karen Allen – Raiders of the Lost Ark as Marion Ravenwood**; Jenny Agutter – An American Werewolf in London as Nurse Alex Price; Lily Tomlin – The Incredible Shrinking Woman as Pat Kramer / Judith Beasley; Angela Lansbury – The Mirror Crack'd as Miss Marple; Margot Kidder – Superman II as Lois Lane
Best Supporting Actor	Best Supporting Actress
**Burgess Meredith – Clash of the Titans as Ammon**; Ralph Richardson – Dragonslayer as Ulrich of Cragganmore; Nicol Williamson – Excalibur as Merlin; Paul Freeman – Raiders of the Lost Ark as Dr. René Belloq; Craig Warnock – Time Bandits as Kevin	**Frances Sternhagen – Outland as Dr. Marian Lazarus**; Maggie Smith – Clash of the Titans as Thetis; Helen Mirren – Excalibur as Morgana; Viveca Lindfors – The Hand as Doctress; Kyle Richards – The Watcher in the Woods as Ellie Curtis
Best Director	Best Writing
**Steven Spielberg – Raiders of the Lost Ark**; John Carpenter – Escape from New York; John Boorman – Excalibur; Terry Gilliam – Time Bandits; Michael Wadleigh – Wolfen	**Lawrence Kasdan – Raiders of the Lost Ark**; John Landis – An American Werewolf in London; Peter Hyams – Outland; Terry Gilliam and Michael Palin – Time Bandits; David Eyre and Michael Wadleigh – Wolfen
Best Music	Best Costumes
**John Williams – Raiders of the Lost Ark**; Laurence Rosenthal – Clash of the Titans; Colin Towns – Full Circle; Jerry Goldsmith – Outland; Ken Thorne – Superman II	**Bob Ringwood – Excalibur**; Emma Porteous – Clash of the Titans; Anthony Mendleson – Dragonslayer; Stephen Loomis – Escape from New York; Deborah Nadoolman – Raiders of the Lost Ark
Best Make-up	Best Special Effects
**Rick Baker – An American Werewolf in London**; Stan Winston – Dead & Buried; Ken Chase – Escape from New York; Basil Newall and Anna Dryhurst – Excalibur; Stan Winston – Heartbeeps	**Richard Edlund – Raiders of the Lost Ark**; Ray Harryhausen – Clash of the Titans; Brian Johnson and Dennis Muren – Dragonslayer; John Stears – Outland; Jon Bunker – Time Bandits

=== Special awards ===
==== Service Award ====
- Gary "Zak" Sakharoff

==== President's Award ====
- Time Bandits

==== Life Career Award ====
- Ray Harryhausen

==== Outstanding Film Award ====
- Quest for Fire

==== Executive Achievement Award ====
- Hans J. Salter

==== Golden Scroll of Merit (Outstanding Achievement) ====
- Bo Svenson – Butcher, Baker, Nightmare Maker

== Films with multiple nominations ==
- Raiders of the Lost Ark - 9
- Outland - 6
- Clash of the Titans - 5
- Time Bandits - 5
- Escape from New York - 4
- Wolfen - 4

== Films with multiple wins ==
- Raiders of the Lost Ark - 7
- An American Werewolf in London - 2
- Quest for Fire - 2
