= Saturn Award for Best Costume Design =

Award for costume design

- Awarded for: Best costume design of the year for a genre film
- Country: United States
- Presented by: Academy of Science Fiction, Fantasy and Horror Films
- First award: 1977
- Currently held by: Kate Hawley for Frankenstein (2024/2025)
- Website: www.saturnawards.org

The Saturn Award for Best Costume Design is one of the annual awards given by the Academy of Science Fiction, Fantasy and Horror Films. The Saturn Awards, which are the oldest film-specialized awards to reward science fiction, fantasy, and horror achievements (the Hugo Award for Best Dramatic Presentation is the oldest award for science fiction and fantasy films), included the category for the first time at the 4th Saturn Awards in 1977.

== Winners and nominees ==
=== 1970s ===
Year	Costume designer(s)	Film
1976 (4th)	Bill Thomas	Logan's Run
1977 (5th)	John Mollo	Star Wars
1977 (5th)	Julie Harris	The Slipper and the Rose: The Story of Cinderella
1977 (5th)	Chuck Keehne and Emily Sundby	Pete's Dragon
1977 (5th)	Richard La Motte	The Island of Dr. Moreau
1977 (5th)	Cynthia Tingey	Sinbad and the Eye of the Tiger
1978 (6th)	Theoni V. Aldredge	Eyes of Laura Mars
1978 (6th)	Yvonne Blake and Richard Bruno	Superman
1978 (6th)	Patricia Norris	Capricorn One
1978 (6th)	Theadora Van Runkle and Richard Bruno	Heaven Can Wait
1978 (6th)	Tony Walton	The Wiz
1979 (7th)	Jean-Pierre Dorleac	Buck Rogers in the 25th Century
1979 (7th)	Sal Anthony and Yvonne Kubis	Time After Time
1979 (7th)	Jean-Pierre Dorleac	Battlestar Galactica: Saga of a Star World
1979 (7th)	Robert Fletcher	Star Trek: The Motion Picture
1979 (7th)	Gisela Storch	Nosferatu the Vampyre

=== 1980s ===
Year	Costume designer(s)	Film
1980 (8th)	Jean-Pierre Dorleac	Somewhere in Time
1980 (8th)	Danilo Donati	Flash Gordon
1980 (8th)	Doris Lynn	Fade to Black
1980 (8th)	John Mollo	The Empire Strikes Back
1980 (8th)	Durinda Wood	Battle Beyond the Stars
1981 (9th)	Bob Ringwood	Excalibur
1981 (9th)	Stephen Loomis	Escape from New York
1981 (9th)	Anthony Mendleson	Dragonslayer
1981 (9th)	Deborah Nadoolman	Raiders of the Lost Ark
1981 (9th)	Emma Porteous	Clash of the Titans
1982 (10th)	Elois Jenssen and Rosanna Norton	Tron
1982 (10th)	John Bloomfield	Conan the Barbarian
1982 (10th)	Christine Boyar	The Sword and the Sorcerer
1982 (10th)	Robert Fletcher	Star Trek II: The Wrath of Khan
1982 (10th)	Norma Moriceau	Mad Max 2
1983 (11th)	Aggie Guerard Rodgers and Nilo Rodis-Jamero	Return of the Jedi
1983 (11th)	Milena Canonero	The Hunger
1983 (11th)	Anthony Mendleson	Krull
1983 (11th)	Ruth Myers	Something Wicked This Way Comes
1983 (11th)	Tom Rand	The Pirates of Penzance
1984 (12th)	Bob Ringwood	Dune
1984 (12th)	Robert Fletcher	Star Trek III: The Search for Spock
1984 (12th)	John Mollo	Greystoke: The Legend of Tarzan, Lord of the Apes
1984 (12th)	Patricia Norris	2010: The Year We Make Contact
1984 (12th)	Anthony Powell	Indiana Jones and the Temple of Doom
1985 (13th)	Nanà Cecchi	Ladyhawke
1985 (13th)	Raymond Hughes	Return to Oz
1985 (13th)	Norma Moriceau	Mad Max Beyond Thunderdome
1985 (13th)	Shirley Russell	The Bride
1985 (13th)	Deborah Lynn Scott	Back to the Future
1986 (14th)	Robert Fletcher	Star Trek IV: The Voyage Home
1986 (14th)	Marit Allen	Little Shop of Horrors
1986 (14th)	Brian Froud and Ellis Flyte	Labyrinth
1986 (14th)	Emma Porteous	Aliens
1986 (14th)	Theadora Van Runkle	Peggy Sue Got Married
1987 (15th)	Phyllis Dalton	The Princess Bride
1987 (15th)	Susan Becker	The Lost Boys
1987 (15th)	Robert Blackman	The Running Man
1987 (15th)	Michael W. Hoffman and Aggie Lyon	The Monster Squad
1987 (15th)	Erica Edell Phillips	RoboCop
1987 (15th)	Julie Weiss	Masters of the Universe
1988 (16th)	Barbara Lane	Willow
1988 (16th)	Stephen M. Chudej	Nightfall
1988 (16th)	Denise Cronenberg	Dead Ringers
1988 (16th)	Michael Jeffery	The Lair of the White Worm
1988 (16th)	Darcie F. Olson	Killer Klowns from Outer Space
1988 (16th)	Leonard Pollack	Waxwork
1989/1990 (17th)	Erica Edell Phillips	Total Recall
1989/1990 (17th)	Milena Canonero	Dick Tracy
1989/1990 (17th)	Joanna Johnston	Back to the Future Part II
1989/1990 (17th)	Joanna Johnston	Back to the Future Part III
1989/1990 (17th)	Jill M. Ohanneson	Bill & Ted's Excellent Adventure
1989/1990 (17th)	Gabriella Pescucci	The Adventures of Baron Munchausen
1989/1990 (17th)	Anthony Powell and Joanna Johnston	Indiana Jones and the Last Crusade
1989/1990 (17th)	Bob Ringwood	Batman
1989/1990 (17th)	Alonzo Wilson, Lesja Liber, Xenia Beith, Fiona Cazaly, and Marian Keating	Teenage Mutant Ninja Turtles

=== 1990s ===
Year	Costume designer(s)	Film
1991 (18th)	Marilyn Vance	The Rocketeer
1991 (18th)	Colleen Atwood	Edward Scissorhands
1991 (18th)	Colleen Atwood	The Silence of the Lambs
1991 (18th)	John Bloomfield	Robin Hood: Prince of Thieves
1991 (18th)	Beatrix Aruna Pasztor	The Fisher King
1991 (18th)	Franca Zucchelli	Frankenstein Unbound
1992 (19th)	Eiko Ishioka	Bram Stoker's Dracula
1992 (19th)	Lisa Jensen	Freejack
1992 (19th)	Robyn Reichek	Mom and Dad Save the World
1992 (19th)	Bob Ringwood and David Perry	Alien 3
1992 (19th)	Bob Ringwood, Mary E. Vogt, and Vin Burnham	Batman Returns
1992 (19th)	Dodie Shepard	Star Trek VI: The Undiscovered Country
1992 (19th)	Albert Wolsky	Toys
1993 (20th)	Mary E. Vogt	Hocus Pocus
1993 (20th)	Theoni V. Aldredge	Addams Family Values
1993 (20th)	Jennifer Butler	Groundhog Day
1993 (20th)	Gloria Gresham	Last Action Hero
1993 (20th)	Sue Moore and Eric H. Sandberg	Jurassic Park
1993 (20th)	Joseph A. Porro	Super Mario Bros.
1993 (20th)	Bob Ringwood	Demolition Man
1994 (21st)	Sandy Powell	Interview with the Vampire
1994 (21st)	Ha Nguyen	The Mask
1994 (21st)	Rosanna Norton	The Flintstones
1994 (21st)	Arianne Phillips	The Crow
1994 (21st)	Joseph A. Porro	Stargate
1994 (21st)	Bob Ringwood	The Shadow
1995 (22nd)	Julie Weiss	12 Monkeys
1995 (22nd)	John Bloomfield	Waterworld
1995 (22nd)	Jean Paul Gaultier	The City of Lost Children
1995 (22nd)	Charles Knode	Braveheart
1995 (22nd)	Bob Ringwood and Ingrid Ferrin	Batman Forever
1995 (22nd)	Gianni Versace and Emma Porteous	Judge Dredd
1996 (23rd)	Deborah Everton	Star Trek: First Contact
1996 (23rd)	Colleen Atwood	Mars Attacks!
1996 (23rd)	Kym Barrett	Romeo + Juliet
1996 (23rd)	Robin Michel Bush	Escape from L.A.
1996 (23rd)	Thomas Casterline and Anna B. Sheppard	Dragonheart
1996 (23rd)	Joseph A. Porro	Independence Day
1997 (24th)	Ellen Mirojnick	Starship Troopers
1997 (24th)	Deena Appel	Austin Powers: International Man of Mystery
1997 (24th)	Colleen Atwood	Gattaca
1997 (24th)	Ingrid Ferrin and Robert Turturice	Batman & Robin
1997 (24th)	Jean Paul Gaultier	The Fifth Element
1997 (24th)	Bob Ringwood	Alien: Resurrection
1998 (25th)	Jenny Beavan	Ever After: A Cinderella Story
1998 (25th)	Vin Burnham, Robert Bell, and Gilly Hebden	Lost in Space
1998 (25th)	Michael Kaplan and Magali Guidasci	Armageddon
1998 (25th)	Liz Keogh	Dark City
1998 (25th)	Judianna Makovsky	Pleasantville
1998 (25th)	Graciela Mazón	The Mask of Zorro
1999 (26th)	Trisha Biggar	Star Wars: Episode I – The Phantom Menace
1999 (26th)	Colleen Atwood	Sleepy Hollow
1999 (26th)	Kym Barrett	The Matrix
1999 (26th)	John Bloomfield	The Mummy
1999 (26th)	Marilyn Vance	Mystery Men
1999 (26th)	Albert Wolsky	Galaxy Quest

=== 2000s ===
Year	Costume designer(s)	Film
2000 (27th)	Louise Mingenbach	X-Men
2000 (27th)	Caroline de Vivaise	Shadow of the Vampire
2000 (27th)	Eiko Ishioka and April Napier	The Cell
2000 (27th)	Rita Ryack and David Page	How the Grinch Stole Christmas
2000 (27th)	Janty Yates	Gladiator
2000 (27th)	Timmy Yip	Crouching Tiger, Hidden Dragon
2001 (28th)	Judianna Makovsky	Harry Potter and the Philosopher's Stone
2001 (28th)	Colleen Atwood	Planet of the Apes
2001 (28th)	Kym Barrett	From Hell
2001 (28th)	Dominique Borg	Brotherhood of the Wolf
2001 (28th)	Ngila Dickson and Richard Taylor	The Lord of the Rings: The Fellowship of the Ring
2001 (28th)	Catherine Martin and Angus Strathie	Moulin Rouge!
2002 (29th)	Ngila Dickson and Richard Taylor	The Lord of the Rings: The Two Towers
2002 (29th)	Trisha Biggar	Star Wars: Episode II – Attack of the Clones
2002 (29th)	Deena Appel	Austin Powers in Goldmember
2002 (29th)	Lindy Hemming	Harry Potter and the Chamber of Secrets
2002 (29th)	Bob Ringwood	Star Trek: Nemesis
2002 (29th)	Deborah Lynn Scott	Minority Report
2003 (30th)	Penny Rose	Pirates of the Caribbean: The Curse of the Black Pearl
2003 (30th)	Kym Barrett	The Matrix Revolutions
2003 (30th)	Ngila Dickson and Richard Taylor	The Lord of the Rings: The Return of the King
2003 (30th)	Louise Mingenbach	X2
2003 (30th)	Janet Patterson	Peter Pan
2003 (30th)	Jacqueline West	The League of Extraordinary Gentlemen
2004 (31st)	Kevin Conran	Sky Captain and the World of Tomorrow
2004 (31st)	Alexandra Byrne	The Phantom of the Opera
2004 (31st)	Wendy Partridge	Hellboy
2004 (31st)	Gabriella Pescucci and Carlo Poggioli	Van Helsing
2004 (31st)	Jany Temime	Harry Potter and the Prisoner of Azkaban
2004 (31st)	Emi Wada	House of Flying Daggers
2005 (32nd)	Isis Mussenden	The Chronicles of Narnia: The Lion, the Witch and the Wardrobe
2005 (32nd)	Trisha Biggar	Star Wars: Episode III – Revenge of the Sith
2005 (32nd)	Lindy Hemming	Batman Begins
2005 (32nd)	Gabriella Pescucci	Charlie and the Chocolate Factory
2005 (32nd)	Terry Ryan	King Kong
2005 (32nd)	Jany Temime	Harry Potter and the Goblet of Fire
2006 (33rd)	Yee Chung-man	Curse of the Golden Flower
2006 (33rd)	Joan Bergin	The Prestige
2006 (33rd)	Nic Ede	Flyboys
2006 (33rd)	Judianna Makovsky	X-Men: The Last Stand
2006 (33rd)	Penny Rose	Pirates of the Caribbean: Dead Man's Chest
2006 (33rd)	Sammy Sheldon	V for Vendetta
2007 (34th)	Colleen Atwood	Sweeney Todd: The Demon Barber of Fleet Street
2007 (34th)	Ruth Myers	The Golden Compass
2007 (34th)	Penny Rose	Pirates of the Caribbean: At World's End
2007 (34th)	Sammy Sheldon	Stardust
2007 (34th)	Jany Temime	Harry Potter and the Order of the Phoenix
2007 (34th)	Michael Wilkinson	300
2008 (35th)	Mary Zophres	Indiana Jones and the Kingdom of the Crystal Skull
2008 (35th)	Lindy Hemming	The Dark Knight
2008 (35th)	Deborah Hopper	Changeling
2008 (35th)	Joanna Johnston	Valkyrie
2008 (35th)	Catherine Martin	Australia
2008 (35th)	Isis Mussenden	The Chronicles of Narnia: Prince Caspian
2009 (36th)	Michael Wilkinson	Watchmen
2009 (36th)	Colleen Atwood	Nine
2009 (36th)	Jenny Beavan	Sherlock Holmes
2009 (36th)	Anna B. Sheppard	Inglourious Basterds
2009 (36th)	Jany Temime	Harry Potter and the Half-Blood Prince
2009 (36th)	Timmy Yip	Red Cliff

=== 2010s ===
Year	Costume designer(s)	Film
2010 (37th)	Colleen Atwood	Alice in Wonderland
2010 (37th)	Milena Canonero	The Wolfman
2010 (37th)	Isis Mussenden	The Chronicles of Narnia: The Voyage of the Dawn Treader
2010 (37th)	Jany Temime	Harry Potter and the Deathly Hallows – Part 1
2010 (37th)	Michael Wilkinson	Tron: Legacy
2010 (37th)	Janty Yates	Robin Hood
2011 (38th)	Alexandra Byrne	Thor
2011 (38th)	Jenny Beavan	Sherlock Holmes: A Game of Shadows
2011 (38th)	Lisy Christl	Anonymous
2011 (38th)	Sandy Powell	Hugo
2011 (38th)	Anna B. Sheppard	Captain America: The First Avenger
2011 (38th)	Jany Temime	Harry Potter and the Deathly Hallows – Part 2
2012 (39th)	Paco Delgado	Les Misérables
2012 (39th)	Colleen Atwood	Snow White and the Huntsman
2012 (39th)	Kym Barrett and Pierre-Yves Gayraud	Cloud Atlas
2012 (39th)	Bob Buck, Ann Maskrey, and Richard Taylor	The Hobbit: An Unexpected Journey
2012 (39th)	Sharen Davis	Django Unchained
2012 (39th)	Jacqueline Durran	Anna Karenina
2013 (40th)	Trish Summerville	The Hunger Games: Catching Fire
2013 (40th)	Gary Jones	Oz the Great and Powerful
2013 (40th)	Michael Kaplan	Star Trek Into Darkness
2013 (40th)	Wendy Partridge	Thor: The Dark World
2013 (40th)	Beatrix Aruna Pasztor	Great Expectations
2013 (40th)	Penny Rose	47 Ronin
2014 (41st)	Ngila Dickson	Dracula Untold
2014 (41st)	Colleen Atwood	Into the Woods
2014 (41st)	Alexandra Byrne	Guardians of the Galaxy
2014 (41st)	Louise Mingenbach	X-Men: Days of Future Past
2014 (41st)	Anna B. Sheppard	Maleficent
2014 (41st)	Janty Yates	Exodus: Gods and Kings
2015 (42nd)	Alexandra Byrne	Avengers: Age of Ultron
2015 (42nd)	Kate Hawley	Crimson Peak
2015 (42nd)	Michael Kaplan	Star Wars: The Force Awakens
2015 (42nd)	Arianne Phillips	Kingsman: The Secret Service
2015 (42nd)	Sandy Powell	Cinderella
2015 (42nd)	Rama Rajamouli and Prashanti Tipirneni	Baahubali: The Beginning
2016 (43rd)	Colleen Atwood	Fantastic Beasts and Where to Find Them
2016 (43rd)	Colleen Atwood	Alice Through the Looking Glass
2016 (43rd)	Alexandra Byrne	Doctor Strange
2016 (43rd)	David Crossman and Glyn Dillon	Rogue One: A Star Wars Story
2016 (43rd)	Sang-gyeong Jo	The Handmaiden
2016 (43rd)	Joanna Johnston	The BFG
2017 (44th)	Jacqueline Durran	Beauty and the Beast
2017 (44th)	Olivier Bériot	Valerian and the City of a Thousand Planets
2017 (44th)	Ruth E. Carter	Black Panther
2017 (44th)	Lindy Hemming	Wonder Woman
2017 (44th)	Michael Kaplan	Star Wars: The Last Jedi
2017 (44th)	Ellen Mirojnick	The Greatest Showman
2018/2019 (45th)	Michael Wilkinson	Aladdin
2018/2019 (45th)	Kym Barrett	Aquaman
2018/2019 (45th)	Leah Butler	Shazam!
2018/2019 (45th)	Judianna Makovsky	Avengers: Endgame
2018/2019 (45th)	Chen Minzheng	Shadow
2018/2019 (45th)	Sandy Powell	Mary Poppins Returns
2019/2020 (46th)	Bina Daigeler	Mulan
2019/2020 (46th)	Erin Benach	Birds of Prey
2019/2020 (46th)	Michael Kaplan	Star Wars: The Rise of Skywalker
2019/2020 (46th)	Arianne Phillips	Once Upon a Time in Hollywood
2019/2020 (46th)	Mayes C. Rubeo	Jojo Rabbit
2019/2020 (46th)	Albert Wolsky	Ad Astra

=== 2020s ===
Year	Costume designer(s)	Film
2021/2022 (50th)	Jacqueline Durran, David Crossman, and Glyn Dillon	The Batman
2021/2022 (50th)	Kym Barrett	Shang-Chi and the Legend of the Ten Rings
2021/2022 (50th)	Jenny Beavan	Cruella
2021/2022 (50th)	Bob Morgan and Jacqueline West	Dune
2021/2022 (50th)	Mayes C. Rubeo	Thor: Love and Thunder
2021/2022 (50th)	Luis Sequeira	Nightmare Alley
2021/2022 (50th)	Sammy Sheldon	Eternals
2022/2023 (51st)	Jacqueline Durran	Barbie
2022/2023 (51st)	Bob Buck and Deborah Scott	Avatar: The Way of Water
2022/2023 (51st)	Ruth E. Carter	Black Panther: Wakanda Forever
2022/2023 (51st)	Joanna Johnston	Indiana Jones and the Dial of Destiny
2022/2023 (51st)	Judianna Makovsky	Guardians of the Galaxy Vol. 3
2022/2023 (51st)	Ellen Mirojnick	Oppenheimer
2023/2024 (52nd)	Colleen Atwood	Beetlejuice Beetlejuice
2023/2024 (52nd)	Graham Churchyard and Mayes C. Rubeo	Deadpool & Wolverine
2023/2024 (52nd)	Alexis Forte and Ruth Myers	Ghostbusters: Frozen Empire
2023/2024 (52nd)	Lindy Hemming	Wonka
2023/2024 (52nd)	Trish Summerville	The Hunger Games: The Ballad of Songbirds & Snakes
2023/2024 (52nd)	Jacqueline West	Dune: Part Two
2024/2025 (53rd)	Kate Hawley	Frankenstein
2024/2025 (53rd)	Alexandra Byrne	The Fantastic Four: First Steps
2024/2025 (53rd)	Ngila Dickson	Predator: Badlands
2024/2025 (53rd)	Ruth E. Carter	Sinners
2024/2025 (53rd)	Judianna Makovsky	Superman
2024/2025 (53rd)	Paul Tazewell	Wicked: For Good

== Multiple nominations ==
14 nominations

- Colleen Atwood

10 nominations

- Bob Ringwood

7 nominations

- Kym Barrett

6 nominations

- Alexandra Byrne
- Joanna Johnston
- Judianna Makovsky
- Jany Temime

5 nominations

- Ngila Dickson
- Lindy Hemming
- Michael Kaplan

4 nominations

- Jenny Beavan
- John Bloomfield
- Jacqueline Durran
- Robert Fletcher
- Sandy Powell
- Penny Rose
- Anna B. Sheppard
- Richard Taylor
- Michael Wilkinson

3 nominations

- Trisha Biggar
- Milena Canonero
- Ruth E. Carter
- Jean-Pierre Dorleac
- Louise Mingenbach
- Ellen Mirojnick
- John Mollo
- Isis Mussenden
- Ruth Myers
- Gabriella Pescucci
- Arianne Phillips
- Joseph A. Porro
- Emma Porteous
- Mayes C. Rubeo
- Deborah Lynn Scott
- Sammy Sheldon
- Jacqueline West
- Albert Wolsky
- Janty Yates

2 nominations

- Theoni V. Aldredge
- Deena Appel
- Richard Bruno
- Vin Burnham
- David Crossman
- Glyn Dillon
- Ingrid Ferrin
- Jean Paul Gaultier
- Kate Hawley
- Eiko Ishioka
- Catherine Martin
- Anthony Mendleson
- Norma Moriceau
- Patricia Norris
- Rosanna Norton
- Wendy Partridge
- Beatrix Aruna Pasztor
- Erica Edell Phillips
- Anthony Powell
- Trish Summerville
- Theadora Van Runkle
- Marilyn Vance
- Mary E. Vogt
- Julie Weiss
- Timmy Yip

== Multiple wins ==
4 wins

- Colleen Atwood

3 wins

- Jacqueline Durran

2 wins

- Trisha Biggar
- Alexandra Byrne
- Ngila Dickson
- Jean-Pierre Dorleac
- Bob Ringwood
