= Trisha Biggar =

Scottish costume designer

Trisha Biggar is a Glasgow born costume designer for theatre, TV and film including the Star Wars franchise and Outlander TV series.

From 1997 Biggar was head of the costume department at Lucasfilm working on the Star Wars 'prequels' for which she created the costumes for Padmé Amidala. In 2012 she was awarded the Outstanding Contribution for Craft Award at the Scottish BAFTAs for her Star Wars costume design. Star Wars creator George Lucas described Biggar as "one of the most talented, brilliant and creative designers I’ve ever worked with".

== Early career ==
Trisha Biggar's first costume job was at the Pitlochry Festival Theatre in Perthshire, where she worked for a summer "sewing costumes". From 1978 Biggar spent 12 years working as wardrobe mistress at the Citizens Theatre in the Gorbals, Glasgow, where she worked with Philip Prowse who remembers "her eye and her flair". At "The Citz", Biggar was responsible for materials and budgets, and found "smart solutions" to creating luxurious-looking costumes for very little cost. She has said in interviews that Prowse also taught her how to reinterpret historical dress for modern sensibilities, creating a more "stylised interpretation" than a direct copy of the past.

Biggar went on to study costume design at Wimbledon College of Arts before moving into film and television. Her first costume design credit for TV was in 1992, for Van de Walk, a detective series set in Amsterdam.

From 1995–96, Biggar designed costumes for the third series of TheYoung Indiana Jones Chronicles, produced by Lucasfilm, where she met George Lucas and made contacts that would lead on to her designing costumes for Star Wars.

Biggar was costume designer on the miniseries, The Fortunes and Misfortunes of Moll Flanders (1996). This work was nominated for the British Academy Craft Award for Costume Design.

== Star Wars ==
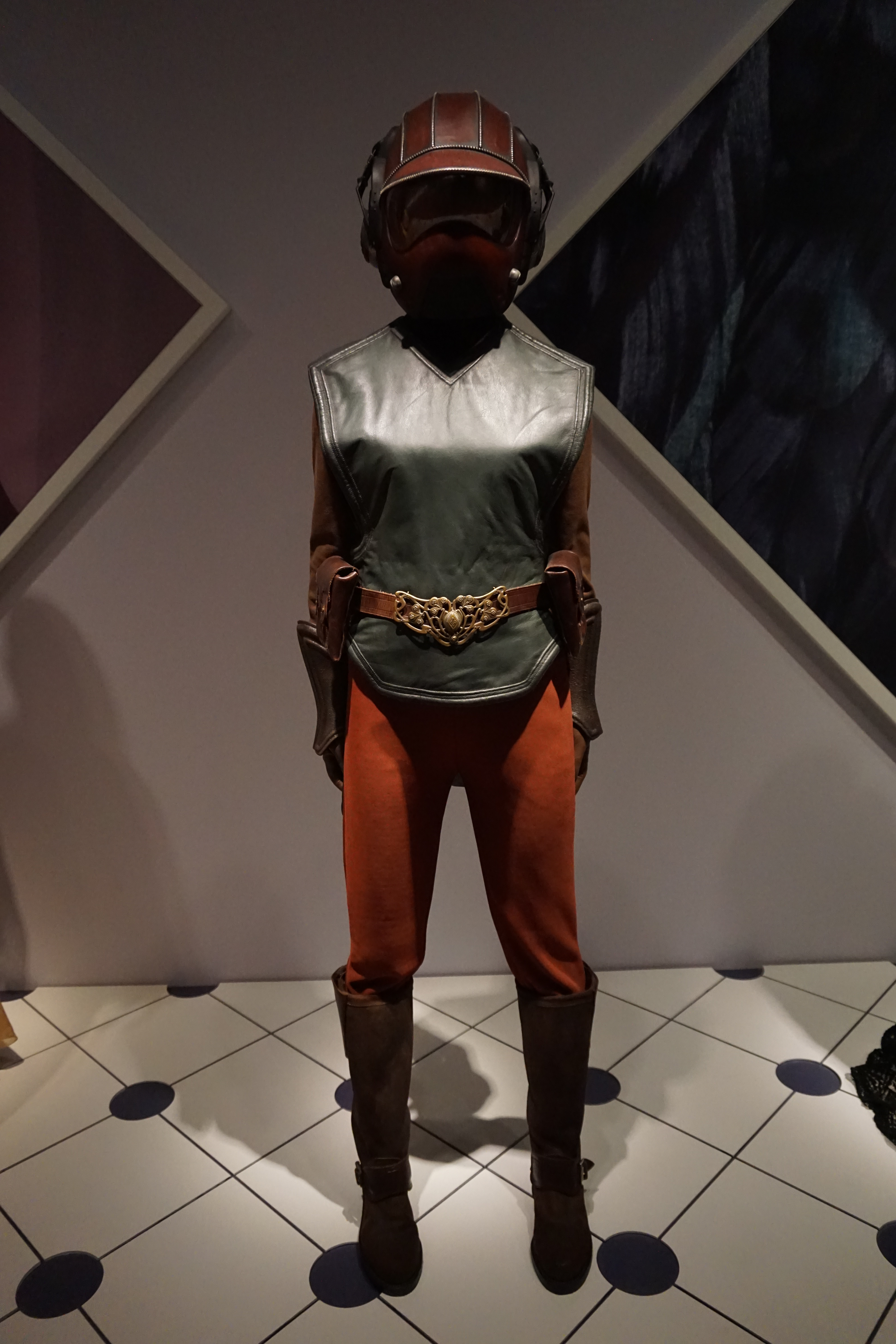
Padmé Amidala's Naboo starfighter pilot costume from Star Wars: Episode II – Attack of the Clones on display at the Star Wars and the Power of Costume traveling exhibit at the Detroit Institute of Arts. Designed by Trisha Biggar.

In 1997, Biggar began working on the Star Wars prequel trilogy, starting with Episode I: The Phantom Menace. George Lucas has written that he wanted the costumes for the prequels to be "much more elaborate and ornate" than the original films, and that Biggar achieved a "sophisticated and grand" look which was "... not quite of this world".

Much of Episode II: Attack of the Clones (2002) was shot in Australia. Biggar led a team of 120 craftspeople, mostly from Australia and New Zealand, plus specialists brought over from the UK, including armour maker Ivo Coveney. Because the film was shot in sequence, their production schedule was disrupted and they had to work 7 days a week to make costumes in time. The overall look of the costumes was darker than for previous films, and the character of Padmé was more complex. Her wedding dress was created from a vintage Italian bedspread, plus extra fabric duplicated by Sandra Fullerton's embroidery company. The veil was a tray cloth, found in a Glasgow vintage shop.

One of Biggar's designs for Padmé Amidala, played by actor Natalie Portman, was displayed in the Scottish Design Galleries for the opening of the V&A Museum in Dundee in 2018. The 'travel disguise' dress was inspired by a Paisley textile design found in Glasgow, and the shape of the garment was based on Russian folk costume. Biggar explained that she had drawn on her own heritage and local shops when designing the costumes, and "around three quarters of all Padmé dresses have got a touch of Scottish vintage on them somewhere". Film theorists have identified the use and appropriation of many cultural references in the design of Star Wars, and noted that the costumes are inspired by "non-Western and particularly Asian culture".

Biggar has been acclaimed as a "noted example" of a woman creative in the Star Wars productions. Within the predominantly male fanbase for the franchise, Biggar and other women involved in the production of the films are acknowledged as "professionals and experts within their respective fields rather than as fans".

In 1999, Biggar's costumes for Star Wars were featured as "couture" in a Vogue magazine photoshoot by Irving Penn. They have also been included in numerous museum collections and exhibitions around the world, e.g. The Art of Star Wars at the National Museum of Photography, Film and Television at Bradford, in 2001.

== Outlander ==
In 2019, Biggar took over costume design for the television show Outlander, produced in Wardpark Studios in Cumbernauld, Scotland. The first four seasons were designed by Terry Dresbach, and Biggar took over for season five. Biggar had experience taking over a series partway though; she had previously worked on the second season of Da Vinici's Demons.

Outlander is a time-travelling fantasy show, and required costumes of many different time periods. Season five additionally had two weddings to design. For season seven, the program jumped to the 1980s in the Scottish Highlands, and Biggar developed a "bold yet cosy" wardrobe to move the characters on through time, yet remain true to their setting.

Biggar explained that her designs for Outlander were inspired by the Scottish landscape, and used a palette of heather purples, browns and greens.

Trisha Biggar was also the costume designer for Blood of My Blood (2025), a prequel to the Outlander series, set in eighteenth century Scotland and First World War England.

== Awards and nominations ==
- 1997: Nominee: BAFTA Television Craft Award for Best Costume Design. The Fortunes and Misfortunes of Moll Flanders
- 1999: Winner: Saturn Award for Best Costume Design. Star Wars Episode I: The Phantom Menace
- 2002: Nominee: Saturn Award for Best Costume Design. Star Wars Episode II: Attack of the Clones
- 2002: Nominee: Satellite Award for Best Costume Design. Star Wars Episode II: Attack of the Clones
- 2005: Nominee: Saturn Award for Best Costume Design. Star Wars Episode III: Revenge of the Sith
- 2005: Nominee: Costume Designers Guild Award for Excellence in Sci-Fi/Fantasy Film. Star Wars Episode III: Revenge of the Sith

== Publications ==
Biggar produced a book detailing her designs for Star Wars, and her experience working on the films:

- Dressing a Galaxy: The Costumes of Star Wars (Harry N Abrams, 2005) ISBN 9780810965676.
