= Bob Ringwood =

British costume designer (born 1946)

- Born: 25 November 1946 (age 79); London, England
- Occupation: Costume designer
- Years active: 1979–2004

Bob Ringwood (born 25 November 1946) is a retired British costume designer. He is best known for creating the costumes for David Lynch's space opera film Dune (1984) and for Tim Burton's superhero film Batman (1989) and its sequel Batman Returns (1992). Ringwood has been nominated for two Academy Awards and three BAFTA Awards.

== Filmography ==
Year	Title	Director	Notes
1981	Excalibur	John Boorman	
1982	The Draughtsman's Contract	Peter Greenaway	Art director
1984	Dune	David Lynch	
1985	Santa Claus: The Movie	Jeannot Szwarc	
1986	Solarbabies	Alan Johnson	
1987	Prick Up Your Ears	Stephen Frears	
1987	Empire of the Sun	Steven Spielberg	
1989	Batman	Tim Burton	
1990	Chicago Joe and the Showgirl	Bernard Rose	
1991	American Friends	Tristram Powell	
1992	Alien 3	David Fincher	with David Perry
1992	Batman Returns	Tim Burton	with Mary E. Vogt
1993	Demolition Man	Marco Brambilla	
1994	The Shadow	Russell Mulcahy	
1995	Batman Forever	Joel Schumacher	with Ingrid Ferrin
1997	Alien Resurrection	Jean-Pierre Jeunet	
2001	A.I. Artificial Intelligence	Steven Spielberg	
2002	The Time Machine	Simon Wells	with Deena Appel
2002	Star Trek: Nemesis	Stuart Baird	
2004	Troy	Wolfgang Petersen	

== Awards and nominations ==
Award	Year (Note: Indicates the year of ceremony. Each year is linked to the article about the awards held that year, wherever possible.)	Category	Work	Result	Ref.
Academy Awards	1988	Best Costume Design	Empire of the Sun	Nominated	
Academy Awards	2005	Best Costume Design	Troy	Nominated	
British Academy Film Awards	1982	Best Costume Design	Excalibur	Nominated	
British Academy Film Awards	1989	Best Costume Design	Empire of the Sun	Nominated	
British Academy Film Awards	1990	Best Costume Design	Batman	Nominated	
Las Vegas Film Critics Society Awards	2002	Best Costume Design	A.I. Artificial Intelligence	Nominated	
Saturn Awards	1982	Best Costume Design	Excalibur	Won	
Saturn Awards	1985	Best Costume Design	Dune	Won	
Saturn Awards	1991	Best Costume Design	Batman	Nominated	
Saturn Awards	1993	Best Costume Design	Alien 3	Nominated	
Saturn Awards	1993	Best Costume Design	Batman Returns	Nominated	
Saturn Awards	1994	Best Costume Design	Demolition Man	Nominated	
Saturn Awards	1995	Best Costume Design	The Shadow	Nominated	
Saturn Awards	1996	Best Costume Design	Batman Forever	Nominated	
Saturn Awards	1998	Best Costume Design	Alien Resurrection	Nominated	
Saturn Awards	2003	Best Costume Design	Star Trek: Nemesis	Nominated	
