= Emma Porteous =

Indian costume designer

- Born: 26 June 1936 (age 89); Calcutta, India
- Occupation: Costume Designer

Emma Porteous is a costume designer for film. She has worked in British and American cinema, on films including A View to a Kill (1985), Aliens (1986) and Judge Dredd (1995). Porteous has been nominated for two Primetime Emmy awards and three Saturn Awards.

== Career ==
Emma Porteous began her career in fashion, working in Paris as a sketch artist for a designer.

This was followed by roles as an in-house costume designer for television companies ATV, where she did "all the big musicals and shows with dancers", Rediffusion and London Weekend Television.

Her first job designing costume for film was Performance (1970) starring Mick Jagger, sharing costume credits with Billy Jay. Described as "sartorially radical", the costumes in Performance were at the cutting edge of fashion, featuring "proto-goth" frills for Jagger and satin dresses for it-girl Anita Pallenberg.

Several more film projects followed, including the "innovatory" Entertaining Mr Sloane and Swallows and Amazons (1974). Sue Harper has described Porteous's 1970s film costumes as "marvels of succinctness", being efficient and economical.

Gerry Anderson recruited Porteous to design costumes for the TV series Space: 1999. Porteous said in a later interview that she accepted the move back to television as she wanted "to sit and design for a change", rather than source everyday clothes for contemporary films. She created a new uniform for the series, and also designed the alien creatures, including the "very seventies... feathered and glamorous" alien character Maya, played by Catherine Schell, the red leotard-wearing prison wardens of Devil's Planet, and the "godlike" Cosmic Magician Magus.

Porteous returned to film for a series of bigger budget, American movies including The Island of Dr Moreau (1977) and Clash of the Titans (1981), which gave her wider scope for "inventive" designs.

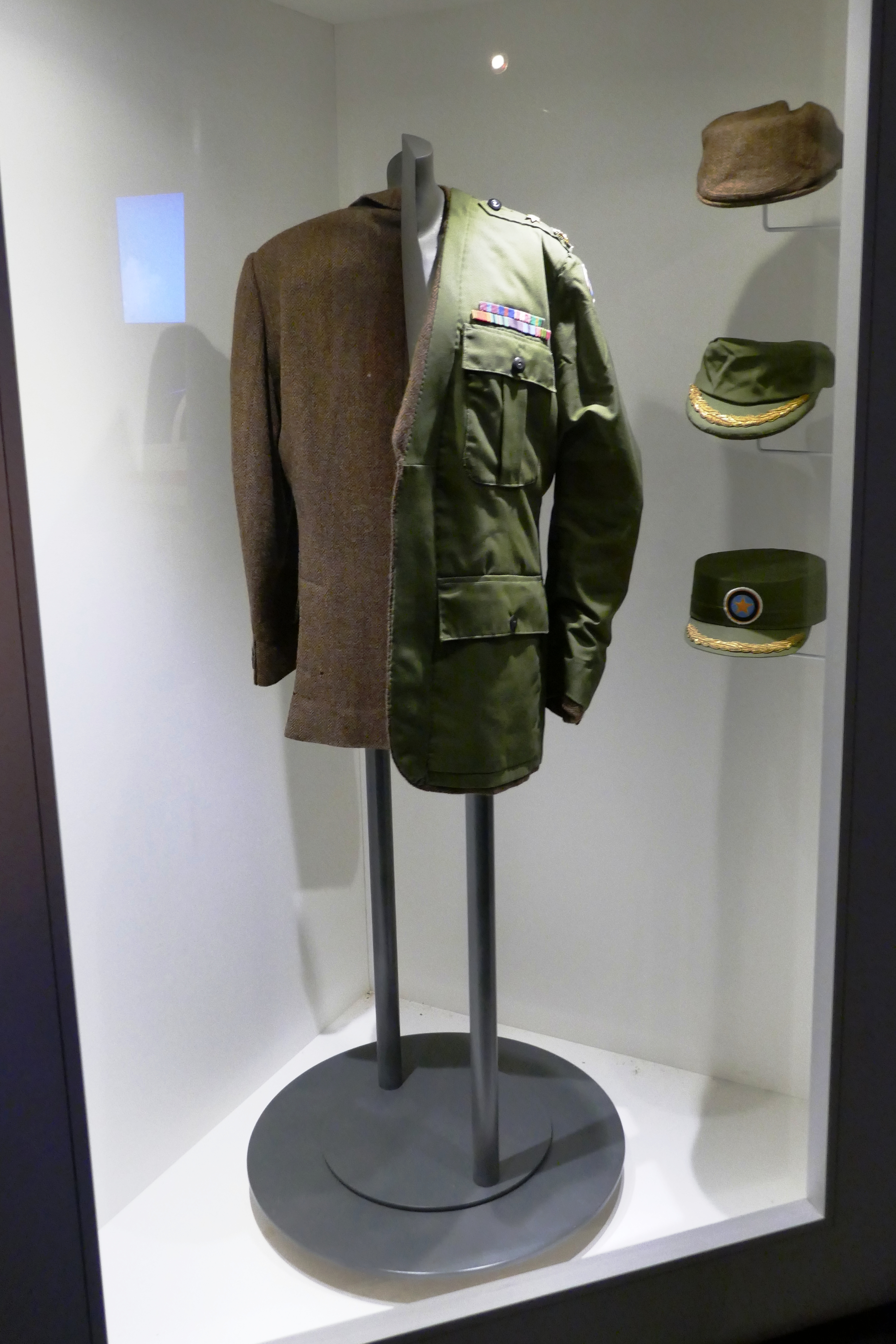
Roger Moore's changing disguise costume from Octopussy, designed by Emma Porteous.

In the 1980s, Porteous contributed to the long-running James Bond franchise with costume design for Octopussy (1983), A View to a Kill (1985) and The Living Daylights (1987). For Octopussy, Porteous contrived a suit that would turn inside out and transform from a tweedy riding ensemble into a Latin American officer's uniform, based closely on descriptions given in the script. In A View to a Kill, Porteous referenced several eighties trends through the costumes, including snowboarding outfits and David Bowie-inspired white suits for Christopher Walken's character. Porteous collaborated with fashion designer Azzedine Alaïa to design a wardrobe of form-fitting avant-garde outfits for Grace Jones as martial-artist May Day. According to fashion historian Christopher Laverty, Porteous first sketched the ensembles to meet the needs of narrative and character, then Alaïa developed them into clothing, using his trademark lycra and leather materials, though "sadly, Porteous's name is often neglected in discussions of the film's costumes". Porteous also worked closely with hair and make-up artists to produce cohesive overall looks for actors.

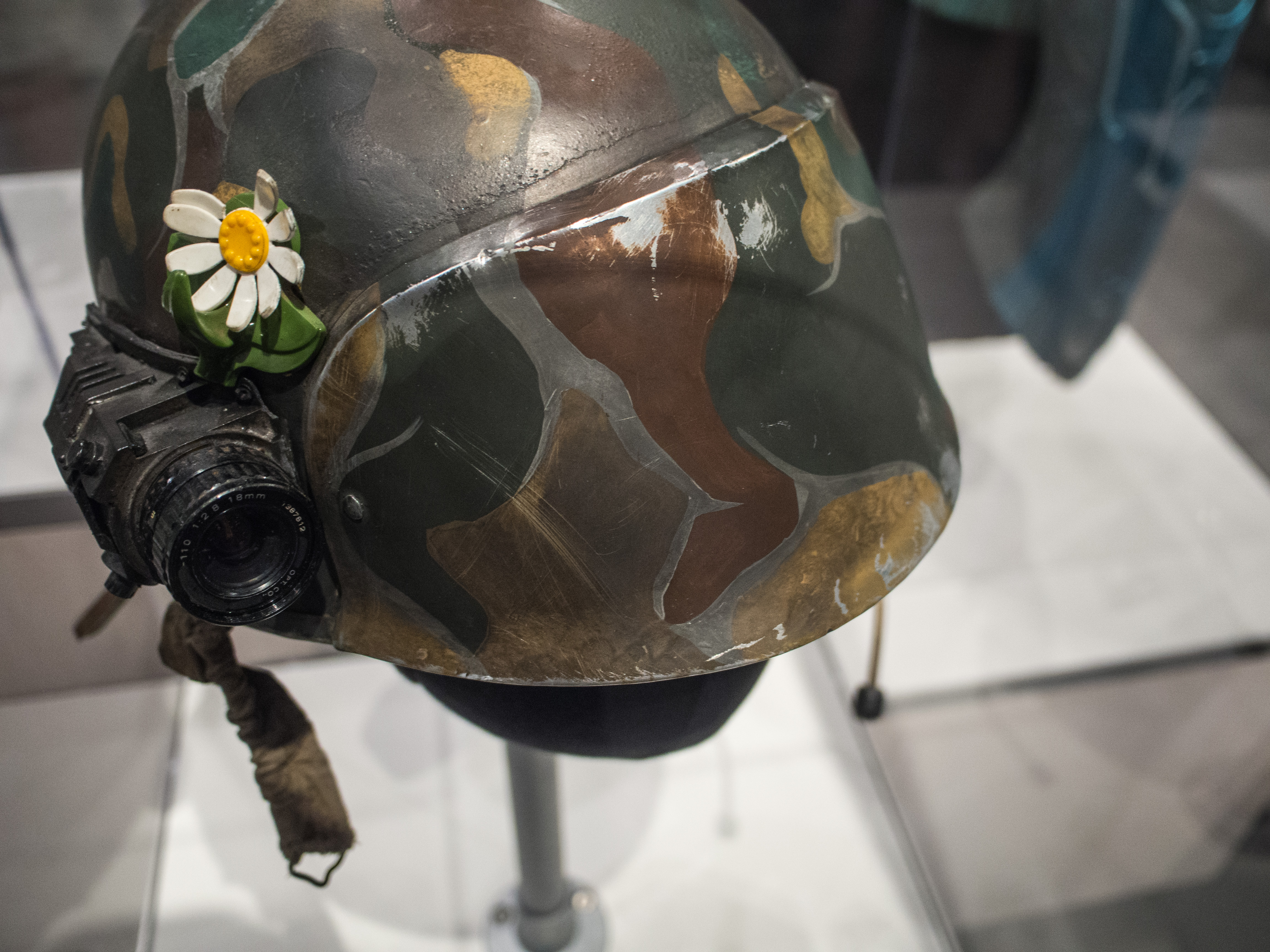
Hick's personalised helmet from the film Aliens, costume designed by Emma Porteous. Icons of Science Fiction exhibit, Experience Music Project/Science Fiction Hall of Fame, Seattle.

The following year, Porteous designed costumes for Aliens (1986), directed by James Cameron. The costumes were intentionally very different from the John Mollo designs of the first film. The crew in Aliens are soldiers, and have personalised uniforms including helmets and webbing. The Weyland-Yutani corporation's board members, in contrast, are styled in "yuppie-casual" style lounge suits. Harper notes that Porteous used her experience of "the body as armour" developed on previous projects to deliver "remarkable work" on the science fiction sequel.

Emma Porteous has a total of over fifty credits in film and television. Her last credit is as costume designer on Lover's Prayer (2001), a period drama set in Russia, starring Kirsten Dunst.

== Awards and nominations ==
- Nominee. 1973 Emmy Award for Outstanding Achievement in Costume Design. Dr. Jekyll and Mr. Hyde.
- Nominee. 1982 Saturn Award for Best Costume Design. Clash of the Titans.
- Nominee. 1987 Saturn Award for Best Costume Design. Aliens.
- Nominee. 1989 Emmy Award for Outstanding Costume Design for A Miniseries or A Special. Around The World in 80 Days.
- Nominee. 1996 Saturn Award for Best Costume Design. Judge Dredd.
