= Ha Nguyen =

Vietnamese-American costume designer

Ha Hong Nguyen (born June 20, 1955 in Saigon, Vietnam - died December 23, 2012) was a Vietnamese American costume designer known for her work on The Nutty Professor, J. J. Abrams' Super 8, and The Mask for which she was nominated for a Saturn Award for Best Costume in 1994.

== Early life ==
Ha Nguyen was born in Saigon. Her family fled the country one day before the fall of Saigon in 1975 and settled in Fort Wayne, IN as her mother's younger brother Hien Vodinh who lived in Fort Wayne at the time, had sponsored his sister's family to immigrate to the United States as refugees. About a year and a half later the family decided to move out to San Diego, CA. After graduating from San Diego State University with a Fine Arts degree, she studied at The Fashion Institute of Design and Merchandising in Los Angeles where she earned an Associate Arts degree in Fashion Design.

== Career ==
In 1996 Ha was invited to join the Academy of Motion Pictures Arts and Sciences.

== Personal life ==
Ha was married to writer-director Dean Heyde. She died December 23, 2012. Husband Dean Heyde died in August 2017. Both are buried at Forest Lawn Cemetery (Hollywood Hills), California next to each other.

== Filmography ==
- Suburban Commando (1991)
- Heaven & Earth (1993)
- The Mask (1994)
- Vampire in Brooklyn (1995)
- Mortal Kombat (1995)
- Thinner (1996)
- The Nutty Professor (1996)
- RoboCop 3 (1997)
- Lethal Weapon 4 (1998)
- Zoom (2006)
- Grace Is Gone (2007)
- Shooter (2007)
- Super 8 (2011)
- Priest (2011)
- Bullet to the Head (2012)
