= The Life Career Award =

Saturn Award's category

Life Career Award
- Awarded for: Lifetime career of quality science fiction, fantasy and horror film and television material
- Country: United States
- Presented by: Academy of Science Fiction, Fantasy & Horror Films
- First award: 1976 (Fritz Lang)
- Website: saturnawards.org

The Life Career Award is presented by the Academy of Science Fiction, Fantasy and Horror Films, in conjunction with their annual Saturn Award ceremony.

== Recipients ==
Below is a list of recipients and the year the award was presented:

=== 1970s ===
- Fritz Lang (1976)
- Samuel Z. Arkoff (1977)
- Christopher Lee (1979)

=== 1980s ===
- Gene Roddenberry (1980)
- William Shatner (1980)
- John Agar (1981)
- Ray Harryhausen (1982)
- Martin B. Cohen (1983)
- Vincent Price (1986)
- Leonard Nimoy (1987)
- Roger Corman (1988)

=== 1990s ===
- Ray Walston (1990)
- Arnold Schwarzenegger (1992)
- David Lynch (1993)
- Alfred Hitchcock (1994)
- Steve Reeves (1994)
- Whit Bissell (1994)
- Joel Silver (1995)
- Richard Fleischer (1995)
- Sean Connery (1995)
- Wes Craven (1995)
- Albert R. Broccoli (1996)
- Edward R. Pressman (1996)
- Harrison Ford (1996)
- Dino De Laurentiis (1997)
- John Frankenheimer (1997)
- Sylvester Stallone (1997)
- James Coburn (1998)
- James Karen (1998)
- Michael Crichton (1998)
- Nathan Juran (1999)

=== 2000s ===
- Dick Van Dyke (2000)
- George Barris (2000)
- Brian Grazer (2001)
- Robert Englund (2001)
- Drew Struzan (2002)
- Stan Lee (2002)
- Kurt Russell (2003)
- Sid and Marty Krofft (2003)
- Blake Edwards (2004)
- Stephen J. Cannell (2005)
- Tom Rothman (2005)
- Robert Halmi (2008)
- Lance Henriksen (2009)

=== 2010s ===
- Irvin Kershner (2010)
- Bert Gordon (2011)
- Michael Biehn (2011)
- Frank Oz (2012)
- James Remar (2012)
- Jonathan Frakes (2013)
- William Friedkin (2013)
- Malcolm McDowell (2014)
- Nichelle Nichols (2016)
- Lee Majors (2017)
- no award (2018)
- Michael Gruskoff (2019/2020)

=== 2020s ===
- Kathryn Leigh Scott (2021/2022)
- Jodie Foster (2022/2023)
