= The President's Memorial Award =

Annual US media award

President's Memorial Award
- Awarded for: Quality science fiction, fantasy and horror film and television material
- Country: United States
- Presented by: Academy of Science Fiction, Fantasy & Horror Films
- First award: 1982
- Website: saturnawards.org

The President's Memorial Award or President's Award is presented by the Academy of Science Fiction, Fantasy and Horror Films, in conjunction with their annual Saturn Award ceremony. The award is given for quality genre entertainment, and is named in honor of academy founder, Dr. Donald A. Reed.

== Recipients ==
Below is a list of recipients and the year the award was presented:

- Time Bandits (1982)
- Roger Corman (1984)
- Jack Arnold (1985)
- Woody Allen (1986)
- The Purple Rose of Cairo (1986)
- Joseph Stefano (1987)
- Marshall Brickman (1987)
- The Manhattan Project (1987)
- Mike Jittlov (1988)
- The Wizard of Speed and Time (1988)
- Carrie Fisher (1990)
- Batman (1991)
- Robert Shaye (1992)
- Gale Anne Hurd (1993)
- Steven Spielberg (1994)
- Bryan Singer (1996)
- Robert Wise (1996)
- Billy Bob Thornton (1997)
- James Cameron (1998)
- Gods and Monsters (1998)
- William Friedkin (1999)
- David Shepard (1999)
- Richard Donner (2000)
- Dustin Lance Black (2001)
- Sherry Lansing (2002)
- James Cameron (2003)
- Gale Anne Hurd (2004)
- Steven E. de Souza
- Elsa Lanchester
- Guillermo del Toro (2018)
- George Lucas (2026)
