= Robert Fletcher (costume designer) =

American costume and set designer (1922–2021)

- Born: August 23, 1922; Cedar Rapids, Iowa, U.S
- Died: April 5, 2021 (aged 98); Kansas City, Missouri, U.S.
- Occupations: Costume, set designer
- Spouse: Jack Kauflin

Robert Fletcher (August 23, 1922 – April 5, 2021) was an American costume and set designer. He was best known for designing costumes for major ballet and opera companies in addition to films, television specials, and New York stage plays.

== Personal life ==
Fletcher was born in August 1922 in Cedar Rapids, Iowa. His father was actor Leon Ames. As of 2018, Fletcher lived in Kansas City, Missouri with his husband Broadway dancer Jack Kauflin. He died there in April 2021 at the age of 98. Kauflin predeceased him.

== Career ==
After the semester in Iowa, Fletcher moved to New York City and worked as an actor, appearing in Ethel Barrymore's last show, Embezzled Heaven. He lived in a cold-water flat with artist Ruth Russell. They had an active social life Fletcher described as "an almost constant state of party", entertaining figures including novelists Gore Vidal and Anaïs Nin, dramatist Tennessee Williams, and musician Lead Belly.

In 1960, Fletcher designed costumes for The Tempest in Stratford, Connecticut starring Katharine Hepburn at the American Shakespeare Theatre.

His work in New York extended into television; in the 1950s he was NBC's "general designer". In 1989, Fletcher moved to Taos, New Mexico, intending to retire, but ended up staying active doing design for Bollywood movies and other projects in the United States, Europe, and Asia, including taking on commissions from one of his former assistants to do design work for HBO's Rome and the Game of Thrones television series. Fletcher's design archives have been donated to Harvard.

Fletcher had a long association with the science fiction franchise Star Trek. He served as costume designer for the first four Star Trek feature films — Star Trek: The Motion Picture, The Wrath of Khan, The Search for Spock, and The Voyage Home.

== Awards ==
In 2005, he received the Costume Designers Guild Career Achievement Award. In 2008, he received a Theatre Development Fund/Irene Sharaff Lifetime Achievement Award for his set design. Fletcher has also received three Tony Award nominations for his work.

Fletcher's three Tony Award nominations were for Little Me in 1963, High Spirits in 1964 and Hadrian VII in 1969. He also received a Drama Desk Award Nomination for Outstanding Costume Design for Othello in 1982.
