= List of Star Trek lists =

This is a list of lists of topics related to the Star Trek franchise on Wikipedia.

== Media ==
=== Series ===
- List of Star Trek television series
  - List of Star Trek: The Original Series episodes
  - List of Star Trek: The Animated Series episodes
  - List of Star Trek: The Next Generation episodes
  - List of Star Trek: Deep Space Nine episodes
  - List of Star Trek: Voyager episodes
  - List of Star Trek: Enterprise episodes
  - List of Star Trek: Discovery episodes
  - List of Star Trek: Short Treks episodes
  - List of Star Trek: Picard episodes
  - List of Star Trek: Lower Decks episodes
  - List of Star Trek: Prodigy episodes
  - List of Star Trek: Strange New Worlds episodes
  - List of Star Trek: Starfleet Academy episodes

=== Films ===
- List of Star Trek films

=== Books ===
- List of Star Trek novels
  - List of Star Trek: Voyager novels
- List of Star Trek reference books

=== Other media ===
- List of Star Trek games
- List of Star Trek: Very Short Treks episodes
- List of Star Trek fan productions

== Cast and characters ==
- List of Star Trek characters

=== Cast by series ===
- List of Star Trek: The Original Series cast members
- List of Star Trek: The Next Generation cast members
- List of Star Trek: Deep Space Nine cast members
- List of Star Trek: Voyager cast members
- List of Star Trek: Enterprise cast members

=== Characters by series ===
- List of Star Trek: The Next Generation characters
- List of Star Trek: Deep Space Nine characters
- List of Star Trek: Voyager characters
- List of Star Trek: Voyager Enterprise
- List of Star Trek: Discovery characters
- List of Star Trek: Picard characters
- List of Star Trek: Lower Decks characters
- List of Star Trek: Strange New Worlds characters
- List of Star Trek: Prodigy characters
- List of Star Trek: Starfleet Academy characters

=== Alphabetical ===
- List of Star Trek characters (A–F)
- List of Star Trek characters (G–M)
- List of Star Trek characters (N–S)
- List of Star Trek characters (T–Z)

== Other people ==
- List of Star Trek production staff
- List of Star Trek composers and music

== Other fictional elements ==
- List of Star Trek aliens

== Awards ==
=== Series ===
- List of awards and nominations received by Star Trek: Deep Space Nine
- List of awards and nominations received by Star Trek: Discovery
- List of awards and nominations received by Star Trek: Enterprise
- List of awards and nominations received by Star Trek: Lower Decks
- List of awards and nominations received by Star Trek: The Next Generation
- List of awards and nominations received by Star Trek: The Original Series
- List of awards and nominations received by Star Trek: Picard
- List of awards and nominations received by Star Trek: Prodigy
- List of awards and nominations received by Star Trek: Strange New Worlds
- List of awards and nominations received by Star Trek: Voyager

=== Films ===
- List of accolades received by Star Trek (film franchise)
- List of accolades received by Star Trek (film)
- List of accolades received by Star Trek Into Darkness
