= List of awards and nominations received by Star Trek: The Next Generation =

Awards and nominations received by Star Trek: The Next Generation
Awards and nominations
Award	Wins	Nominations
ASCAP Film and Television Music Awards	2	2
British Science Fiction Association Award	0	2
Cinema Audio Society Awards	1	2
Emmy Award	19	58
Hugo Award	2	3
Saturn Award	6	10
Peabody Awards	1	1
Screen Actors Guild Awards	0	1
Writers Guild of America	0	1
Youth in Film Awards	2	7

Totals (Note: Certain award groups do not simply award one winner. They acknowledge several different recipients, have runners-up, and have third place. Since this is a specific recognition and is different from losing an award, runner-up mentions are considered wins in this award tally. For simplification and to avoid errors, each award in this list has been presumed to have had a prior nomination.)
- Wins: 33
- Nominations: 87

Star Trek: The Next Generation is an American science fiction television program that originally aired from September 1987 to May 1994. It won and was nominated for a variety of awards, including seven Emmy Award nominations for the first season, and a further eight in its second season. It would go on to be nominated a total of 58 times, of which it won a total of nineteen awards. Only one of these nominations was not for a Creative Arts Emmy, which was the nomination for Outstanding Drama Series for the show's seventh season.

Cast member Wil Wheaton was nominated on three occasions for a Youth in Film Award, which he won in 1989. Further nominations were received by guest actors Kimberly Cullum and Gabriel Damon at the 16th Youth in Film Awards in 1995. The only other nomination for a single actor was the Screen Actors Guild Award received by Patrick Stewart for Outstanding Performance by a Male Actor in a Drama Series in the award's inaugural session in 1995.

As of January 1, 2013, Star Trek: The Next Generation has been nominated for 85 different awards, of which it has won 31. Despite the series ending in 1994, it has continued to win awards in special recognition of the series, and for the DVD releases. In this list, "year" refers to the year the award was presented to the winner.

== ASCAP Film and Television Music Awards ==
List of American Society of Composers, Authors and Publishers Awards and nominations received by Star Trek: The Next Generation
Year	Category	Nominee	Result
1995	Top TV Series	Jay Chattaway	Won
1995	Top TV Series	Dennis McCarthy	Won

== BSFA Awards ==
The British Science Fiction Association Awards have been awarded since 1970 by the British Science Fiction Association. Star Trek: The Next Generation was nominated on two occasions for Best Dramatic Presentation.

List of Saturn Awards and nominations received by Star Trek: The Next Generation
Year	Category	Result
1991	Best Dramatic Presentation	Nominated
1992	Best Dramatic Presentation	Nominated

== Cinema Audio Society Awards ==
The Cinema Audio Society Awards were first handed out in 1994. Star Trek: The Next Generation was nominated twice in the first two years, winning on one occasion.

List of Cinema Audio Society Awards and nominations received by Star Trek: The Next Generation
Year	Category	Nominee	Episode	Result
1994	Outstanding Achievement in Sound Mixing for Television	Chris Haire, Doug Davey, Richard L. Morrison, Alan Bernard	"Genesis"	Nominated
1995	Outstanding Achievement in Sound Mixing for a Television Series	Chris Haire, Doug Davey, Richard L. Morrison, Alan Bernard	"Descent, Part I"	Won

== Emmy Awards ==
The Emmy is a television production award considered the television equivalent to the Academy Award. Star Trek: The Next Generation was nominated for a single Primetime Emmy Award, and a further 57 Creative Arts Emmys, of which it won nineteen.

=== Primetime Emmy Awards ===
List of Primetime Emmy Awards and nominations received by Star Trek: The Next Generation
Year	Category	Nominee	Result
1994	Outstanding Drama Series	Rick Berman, Michael Piller, Jeri Taylor, David Livingston, Peter Lauritson, Merri D. Howard, Ronald D. Moore, Wendy Neuss, Brannon Braga	Nominated

=== Creative Arts Emmy Awards ===
List of Creative Arts Awards and nominations received by Star Trek: The Next Generation
Year	Category	Nominee	Episode	Result
1988	Outstanding Achievement in Makeup for a Series	Werner Keppler, Michael Westmore, Gerald Quist	"Conspiracy"	Won
1988	Outstanding Costume Design for a Series	William Ware Theiss	"The Big Goodbye"	Won
1988	Outstanding Sound Editing for a Series	Bill Wistrom, Wilson Dyer, Mace Matiosian, James Wolvington, Gerry Sackman, Keith Bilderbeck	"11001001"	Won
1988	Outstanding Achievement in Hairstyling for a Series	Richard Sabre	"Haven"	Nominated
1988	Outstanding Achievement in Makeup for a Series	Michael Westmore, Werner Keppler, Gerald Quist, Rolf John Keppler	"Coming of Age"	Nominated
1988	Outstanding Cinematography for a Series	Edward R. Brown	"The Big Goodbye"	Nominated
1988	Outstanding Sound Mixing for a Drama Series	Chris Haire, Doug Davey, Jerry Clemans, Alan Bernard	"Where No One Has Gone Before"	Nominated
1989	Outstanding Sound Editing for a Series	Bill Wistrom, James Wolvington, Mace Matiosian, Wilson Dyer, Guy Tsujimoto, Gerry Sackman	"Q Who"	Won
1989	Outstanding Sound Mixing for a Drama Series	Chris Haire, Doug Davey, Richard L. Morrison, Alan Bernard	"Q Who"	Won
1989	Outstanding Achievement in Hairstyling for a Series	Richard Sabre, Georgina Williams	"Unnatural Selection"	Nominated
1989	Outstanding Achievement in Makeup for a Series	Michael Westmore, Gerald Quist, Janna Phillips	"A Matter of Honor"	Nominated
1989	Outstanding Achievement in Music Composition for a Series	Dennis McCarthy	"The Child"	Nominated
1989	Outstanding Achievement in Special Visual Effects	Dan Curry, Ronald B. Moore, Peter W. Moyer, Steve Price	"Q Who"	Nominated
1989	Outstanding Art Direction for a Series	Richard D. James, Jim Mees	"Elementary, Dear Data"	Nominated
1989	Outstanding Costume Design for a Series	Durinda Wood, William Ware Theiss	"Elementary, Dear Data"	Nominated
1990	Outstanding Achievement in Makeup for a Series	Michael Westmore, Gerald Quist, June Westmore, Hank Edds, Doug Drexler, John Caglione Jr., Ron Walters	"Allegiance"	Nominated
1990	Outstanding Achievement in Music Composition for a Series	Dennis McCarthy	"Yesterday's Enterprise"	Nominated
1990	Outstanding Achievement in Special Visual Effects	Dan Curry, Ronald B. Moore, Peter W. Moyer, Steve Price, Don Lee	"Deja Q"	Nominated
1990	Outstanding Achievement in Special Visual Effects	Robert Legato, Gary Hutzel, Steve Price, Don Greenberg, Erik Nash, Don Lee, Michael Okuda	"Tin Man"	Nominated
1990	Outstanding Editing for a Series – Single Camera Production	Robert Lederman	"Deja Q"	Nominated
1990	Outstanding Sound Mixing for a Drama Series	Alan Bernard, Doug Davey, Richard L. Morrison, Chris Haire	"Yesterday's Enterprise"	Nominated
1990	Outstanding Achievement in Hairstyling for a Series	Vivian McAteer, Barbara Lampson, Rita Bellissimo	"Hollow Pursuits"	Nominated
1990	Outstanding Art Direction for a Series	Richard D. James, Jim Mees	"Sins of the Father"	Won
1990	Outstanding Sound Editing for a Series	Bill Wistrom, James Wolvington, Mace Matiosian, Wilson Dyer, Rick Freeman, Gerry Sackman	"Yesterday's Enterprise"	Won
1991	Outstanding Sound Editing for a Series	Bill Wistrom, James Wolvington, Mace Matiosian, Wilson Dyer, Masanobu 'Tomi' Tomita, Dan Yale, Gerry Sackman	"The Best of Both Worlds, Part II"	Won
1991	Outstanding Sound Mixing for a Drama Series	Alan Bernard, Doug Davey, Chris Haire, Richard L. Morrison	"The Best of Both Worlds, Part II"	Won
1991	Outstanding Achievement in Makeup for a Series	Michael Westmore, Abston Haymore June, Gerald Quist, Michael Mills	"Brothers"	Nominated
1991	Outstanding Achievement in Makeup for a Series	Michael Westmore, Gerald Quist, Abston Haymore June, Ed French, Jill Rockow, Gilbert A. Mosko	"Identity Crisis"	Nominated
1991	Outstanding Achievement in Music Composition for a Series	Dennis McCarthy	"Half a Life"	Nominated
1991	Outstanding Achievement in Special Visual Effects	Gary Hutzel, Robert Legato, David Takemura, Michael Okuda, Don Greenberg, Erik Nash, Steve Price, Syd Dutton, Robert Stromberg, Bill Taylor, Don Lee	"The Best of Both Worlds, Part II"	Nominated
1991	Outstanding Achievement in Special Visual Effects	Robert Legato, Gary Hutzel, David Takemura, Patrick Clancey, Steve Price, Michael Okuda, Erik Nash, Syd Dutton, Bill Taylor, Don Lee	"The Best of Both Worlds, Part II"	Nominated
1991	Outstanding Art Direction for a Series	Richard D. James, Jim Mees	"The Best of Both Worlds, Part II"	Nominated
1991	Outstanding Cinematography for a Series	Marvin V. Rush	"Family"	Nominated
1991	Outstanding Costume Design for a Series	Robert Blackman	"Devil's Due"	Nominated
1992	Outstanding Individual Achievement in Costume Design for a Series	Robert Blackman	"Cost of Living"	Won
1992	Outstanding Individual Achievement in Makeup for a Series	Michael Westmore, Gerald Quist, Ron Walters, Jane Haymore, Bob Scribner, Ken Diaz, Karen Westerfield, Richard Snell, Tania McComas	"Cost of Living"	Won
1992	Outstanding Individual Achievement in Special Visual Effects	Dan Curry, Ronald B. Moore, David Takemura, Erik Nash, Don Lee, Peter Sternlicht, Adam Howard, Syd Dutton, Robert Stromberg	"A Matter of Time"	Won
1992	Outstanding Individual Achievement in Special Visual Effects	Robert Legato, Gary Hutzel, David Takemura, Patrick Clancey, Adrian Hurley, Adam Howard, Don Lee, Dennis Hoerter	"Conundrum"	Won
1992	Outstanding Individual Achievement in Art Direction for a Series	Richard D. James, Jim Mees	"Unification I"	Nominated
1992	Outstanding Individual Achievement in Hairstyling for a Series	Joy Zapata, Patricia Miller	"Cost of Living"	Nominated
1992	Outstanding Individual Achievement in Music Composition for a Series	Dennis McCarthy	"Unification I"	Nominated
1992	Outstanding Individual Achievement in Sound Editing for a Series	Bill Wistrom, James Wolvington, Wilson Dyer, Masanobu 'Tomi' Tomita, Dan Yale, Gerry Sackman	"Power Play"	Nominated
1992	Outstanding Individual Achievement in Sound Mixing for a Drama Series	Alan Bernard, Chris Haire, Richard L. Morrison, Doug Davey	"The Next Phase"	Won
1993	Outstanding Individual Achievement in Costume Design for a Series	Robert Blackman	"Time's Arrow, Part II"	Won
1993	Outstanding Individual Achievement in Hairstyling for a Series	Joy Zapata, Candace Neal, Patricia Miller, Laura Connolly, Richard Sabre, Julia L. Walker, Josée Normand	"Time's Arrow, Part II"	Won
1993	Outstanding Individual Achievement in Sound Mixing for a Drama Series	Alan Bernard, Doug Davey, Richard L. Morrison, Chris Haire	"A Fistful of Datas"	Won
1993	Outstanding Individual Achievement in Makeup for a Series	Michael Westmore, Gerald Quist, Abston Haymore June, Karen Westerfield, Jill Rockow, Doug Drexler	"The Inner Light"	Nominated
1993	Outstanding Individual Achievement in Sound Editing for a Series	Bill Wistrom, James Wolvington, Miguel Rivera, Masanobu 'Tomi' Tomita, Guy Tsujimoto, Jeff Gersh, Dan Yale, Gerry Sackman	"Time's Arrow, Part II"	Nominated
1994	Outstanding Individual Achievement in Sound Mixing for a Drama Series	Alan Bernard, Chris Haire, Richard L. Morrison, Doug Davey	"Genesis"	Won
1994	Outstanding Individual Achievement in Special Visual Effects	Dan Curry, David Stipes, Michael Backauskas, Scott Rader, Adam Howard, Erik Nash	"All Good Things..."	Won
1994	Outstanding Individual Achievement in Art Direction for a Series	Richard D. James, Andrew Neskoromny, Jim Mees	"Thine Own Self"	Nominated
1994	Outstanding Individual Achievement in Costume Design for a Series	Robert Blackman, Abram Waterhouse	"All Good Things..."	Nominated
1994	Outstanding Individual Achievement in Editing for a Series – Single Camera Production	Daryl Baskin, J.P. Farrell, David Ramirez	"All Good Things..."	Nominated
1994	Outstanding Individual Achievement in Hairstyling for a Series	Joy Zapata, Patricia Miller, Laura Connolly, Carolyn Elias, Don Sheldon, Susan Zietlow-Maust	"Firstborn"	Nominated
1994	Outstanding Individual Achievement in Makeup for a Series	June Westmore, Michael Westmore, Gilbert A. Mosko, Debbie Zoller, Tina Hoffman, David Quashnick, Mike Smithson, Hank Edds, Kevin Haney, Michael Key	"Genesis"	Nominated
1994	Outstanding Individual Achievement in Music Composition for a Series	Dennis McCarthy	"All Good Things..."	Nominated
1994	Outstanding Individual Achievement in Sound Editing for a Series	Mace Matiosian, Ruth Adelman, Miguel Rivera, Masanobu 'Tomi' Tomit, Guy Tsujimoto, Jeff Gersh, Gerry Sackman, Jerry Trent, Audrey Trent	"Genesis"	Nominated

== Hugo Awards ==
The Hugo Awards were first awarded in 1952, and were named the Science Fiction Achievement Awards until 1992. Episodes of The Next Generation were nominated on three occasions, winning twice.

List of Hugo Awards and nominations received by Star Trek: The Next Generation
Year	Category	Episode	Result
1988	Best Dramatic Presentation	"Encounter at Farpoint"	Nominated
1993	Best Dramatic Presentation	"The Inner Light"	Won
1995	Best Dramatic Presentation	"All Good Things..."	Won

== Saturn Awards ==
Awarded since 1972, the Saturn Awards is an annual accolade presented by the Academy of Science Fiction, Fantasy and Horror Films to honor science fiction and fantasy films and television shows. Star Trek: The Next Generation has been nominated for seven awards, and won three of them. It was also awarded a Special Recognition Award for the work of all the Star Trek television series in 2005, and further awards for releases of the first five seasons on Blu-ray. In 2024, the entire cast was additionally awarded a special Lifetime Achievement Award. (Note: The Lifetime Achievement Award is usually presented to an individual for their contributions to genre entertainment. Top luminaries like Stan Lee and Leonard Nimoy, Mr. Spock himself, have received this top honor. It's not new, but we extended this award to cover the entire cast of Star Trek: The Next Generation, due to its continued influence on the face of general television. It was originally doomed to failure since it was following in the footsteps of the original Star Trek, yet it carved its own identity, and its diverse cast was light years ahead of its time!" —Academy of Science Fiction, Fantasy and Horror Films)

List of Saturn Awards and nominations received by Star Trek: The Next Generation
Year	Category	Result
1988	Best Television Series	Won
1991	Best Television Series	Won
1992	Best Television Series	Nominated
1993	Best Television Series	Nominated
1994	Best Television Series	Nominated
1995	Best Television Series	Nominated
2002	Best DVD TV Programming Release	Won
2005	Special Recognition Award to the Star Trek TV series	Won
2013	Best DVD/Blu-ray TV Series Release	Won
2014	Best DVD/Blu-ray TV Series Release	Won
2015	Best DVD/Blu-ray TV Series Release	Nominated
2024	Lifetime Achievement Award (entire cast)	Won

== Youth in Film Awards ==
The first Youth in Film Awards were awarded in 1979. Cast member Wil Wheaton was nominated on three occasions and won once. Two further nominations were received in 1995 for guest actors Kimberly Cullum and Gabriel Damon.

List of Youth in Film Awards and nominations received by Star Trek: The Next Generation
Year	Category	Nominee	Result
1988	Best Young Actor Starring in a Television Drama Series	Wil Wheaton	Nominated
1989	Best Young Actor in a Family Syndicated Show	Wil Wheaton	Won
1989	Best Syndicated Family Drama or Comedy		Won
1990	Best Young Actor in an Off-Primetime Family Series	Wil Wheaton	Nominated
1990	Best Off-Prime Time Family Series		Nominated
1995	Best Performance by a Youth Actress – TV Guest Star	Kimberly Cullum	Nominated
1995	Best Performance by a Youth Actor – TV Guest Star	Gabriel Damon	Nominated

== Other awards ==
Star Trek: The Next Generation was awarded a Peabody Award for the episode "The Big Goodbye". The Peabody Board saw the series as a new standard in syndicated television, and set forth a challenge to the broadcast industry to produce other shows in syndication of the same quality.

Rather than give in to the usual realities of "first-run" and produce a low budget, but profitable program, the producers chose instead to opt for the highest quality in writing, decor, acting, and, indeed, all facets of the production. In doing so, they have set a new standard of quality for first-run syndication and this is exemplified in the episode "The Big Goodbye."

— The Peabody Board.

List of other awards and nominations received by Star Trek: The Next Generation
Year	Award	Category	Nominee(s)	Episode	Result
1988	George Foster Peabody Awards			"The Big Goodbye"	Honoured
1990	Writers Guild of America Awards	Best Episodic Drama	Melinda M. Snodgrass	"The Measure of a Man"	Nominated
1995	Screen Actors Guild Awards	Outstanding Performance by a Male Actor in a Drama Series	Patrick Stewart		Nominated
2023	Peabody Awards	Peabody Institutional Award	Star Trek franchise, all series		Won

== See also ==
- List of Star Trek: The Original Series awards and nominations
- List of Star Trek: Deep Space Nine awards and nominations
- List of Star Trek: Voyager awards and nominations
- List of Star Trek: Enterprise awards and nominations
- List of Star Trek: Discovery awards and nominations
