= List of awards and nominations received by Star Trek: Voyager =

Awards and nominations received by Star Trek: Voyager
Awards and nominations
Award	Wins	Nominations
ADG Excellence in Production Design Awards	0	4
American Latino Media Arts Awards	0	5
ASCAP Film and Television Music Awards	3	3
Cinema Audio Society of America Awards	0	3
Emmy Awards	7	35
Hollywood Makeup Artist and Hair Stylist Guild Awards	3	6
International Monitor Awards	1	1
Peabody Awards	1	1
Golden Satellite Awards	2	2
Saturn Awards	3	14
Youth in Film Awards	1	1

Totals (Note: Certain award groups do not simply award one winner. They acknowledge several different recipients, have runners-up, and have third place. Since this is a specific recognition and is different from losing an award, runner-up mentions are considered wins in this award tally. For simplification and to avoid errors, each award in this list has been presumed to have had a prior nomination.)
- Wins: 20
- Nominations: 78

Star Trek: Voyager is an American science fiction television series that aired from January 1995 to May 2001. The series won various awards and nominations for their cast, writers and the series itself.

== ADG Excellence in Production Design Awards ==
Year	Category	Nominee	Episode	Result
1997	Best Television Series	Richard D. James, Louise Dorton, Leslie Parsons		Nominated
1998	Best Television Series	Richard D. James, Louise Dorton		Nominated
1999	Best Television Episode - Single Camera Series	Richard D. James, Louise Dorton	"11:59"	Nominated
2000	Best Television Episode - Single Camera Series	Richard D. James, Louise Dorton	"Critical Care"	Nominated

== American Latino Media Arts Awards ==
Year	Category	Nominee	Result
1998	Outstanding Actress in a Drama Series	Roxann Dawson	Nominated
1998	Outstanding Individual Performance in a Television Series in a Crossover Role	Robert Beltran	Nominated
1999	Outstanding Actress in a Drama Series	Roxann Dawson	Nominated
1999	Outstanding Individual Performance in a Television Series in a Crossover Role	Robert Beltran	Nominated
2000	Outstanding Actress in a Drama Series	Roxann Dawson	Nominated
2001	Outstanding Achievement in a Television Series Award	Roxann Dawson	Honoured
2001	Outstanding Achievement in a Television Series Award	Robert Beltran	Honoured

== Art Directors Guild ==
Year	Category	Nominee	Result
1998	Excellence in Production Design	Richard D. James, Louise Dorton, Leslie Parsons	Nominated
1999	Excellence in Production Design	Richard D. James, Louise Dorton	Nominated
2000	Excellence in Production Design	Richard D. James, Louise Dorton	Nominated
2001	Excellence in Production Design	Richard D. James, Louise Dorton	Nominated

== ASCAP Film and Television Music Awards ==
Year	Category	Nominee	Result
1999	Top TV Series	Jay Chattaway, Dennis McCarthy, David Bell	Won
2000	Top TV Series	Jay Chattaway, Dennis McCarthy, David Bell	Won
2001	Top TV Series	Jay Chattaway, Dennis McCarthy, David Bell	Won

== Cinema Audio Society of America Awards ==
Year	Category	Nominee	Episode	Result
1998	Outstanding Achievement in Sound Mixing for a Television Series	Alan Bernard, Chris Haire, Doug Davey, Richard L. Morrison	"Future's End"	Nominated
2000	Outstanding Achievement in Sound Mixing for a Television Series	Alan Bernard, Chris Haire, Doug Davey, Richard L. Morrison	"Equinox"	Nominated
2001	Outstanding Achievement in Sound Mixing for a Television Series	Alan Bernard, Chris Haire, Doug Davey, Richard L. Morrison	"Unimatrix Zero"	Nominated

== Emmy Awards ==
In an effort to gain a nomination for a dramatic category following the final season, adverts were taken out in Variety magazine to encourage voters to select Voyager.

Year	Category	Nominee	Episode	Result
1995	Outstanding Individual Achievement in Main Title Theme Music	Jerry Goldsmith		Won
1995	Outstanding Individual Achievement in Graphic Design and Title Sequences	Dan Curry, John Grower, Eric Guaglione, Erik Tiemens		Nominated
1995	Outstanding Individual Achievement in Makeup for a Series	Michael Westmore, Tina Kalliogis-Hoffman, Michael Key, Barry R. Koper, Gill Mosko, Bill Myer, Greg Nelson, Mark Shostrom, Scott Wheeler, Natalie Wood	"Faces"	Nominated
1995	Outstanding Individual Achievement in Special Visual Effects	Michael Backauskas, Joe Bauer, Edward L. Williams, Dan Curry, Joshua Cushner, Don B. Greenberg, Scott Rader, Adam Howard, Don Lee, John Parenteau, Joshua Rose, Robert Stromberg	"Caretaker"	Won
1995	Outstanding Individual Achievement in Costume Design for a Series	Robert Blackman	"Caretaker"	Nominated
1995	Outstanding Individual Achievement in Hairstyling for a Series	Josée Normand, Caryl Codon, Rebecca De Morrio, Dino Ganziano, Virginia Kearns, Audrey Levy, Shawn McKay, Patty Miller, Barbara Kaye Minster, Karen Asano Myers, Gloria Albarran Ponce, Katherine Rees, Patricia Vecchio, Faith Vecchio	"Caretaker"	Nominated
1995	Outstanding Individual Achievement in Music Composition for a Series	Jay Chattaway	"Caretaker"	Nominated
1995	Outstanding Individual Achievement in Music Composition for a Series	Jay Chattaway	"Heroes and Demons"	Nominated
1995	Outstanding Individual Achievement in Cinematography for a Series	Marvin Rush	"Heroes and Demons"	Nominated
1996	Outstanding Hairstyling for a Series	Karen Asano-Myers, Suzan Bagdadi, Laura Connolly, Barbara Kaye Minster	"Persistence of Vision"	Nominated
1996	Outstanding Makeup for a Series	Michael Westmore, Ellis Burman, Tina Kalliongis-Hoffman, Brad Look, Gil Mosko, Greg Nelson, Mark Shostrom, Steve Weber, Scott Wheeler	"Threshold"	Won
1997	Outstanding Costume Design for a Series	Robert Blackman	"False Profits"	Nominated
1997	Outstanding Hairstyling for a Series	Suzan Bagdadi, Monique De Sart, Frank Fontaine, Charlotte Gravenor, Karen Asano Myers, Diane Pepper, Jo Ann Phillips, Josée Normand	"Fair Trade"	Won
1997	Outstanding Sound Mixing for a Drama Series	Alan Bernard, Doug Davey, Christopher L. Haire, Richard Morrison	"Future's End", Part I	Nominated
1998	Outstanding Hairstyling for a Series	Hazel Catmull, Laura Connolly, Ruby Ford, Charlotte Gravenor, Mimi Jafari, Chris McBee, Lola McNalley, Gloria Montemayor, Josée Normand, Viviane Normand, Dianne Pepper, Barbara Ronci, Adele Taylor, Delree Todd	"The Killing Game"	Nominated
1998	Outstanding Special Visual Effects for a Series	Eric Chauvin, Arthur Codron, Paul Hill, Koji Kuramura, Adam Lebowitz, Greg Rainoff, Mitch Suskin, John M. Teska	"Year of Hell", Part II	Nominated
1999	Outstanding Special Visual Effects for a Series	Rob Bonchune, Adam Lebowitz, Elizabeth Castro, Arthur J. Codron, Dan Curry, Don Greenberg, Paul Hill, Ronald B. Moore, Mitch Suskin, Greg Rainoff, John Teska	"Dark Frontier"	Won
1999	Outstanding Special Visual Effects for a Series	Bruce Branit, Liz Castro, Dan Curry, Paul Hill, Ronald B. Moore, Greg Rainoff	"Thirty Days"	Nominated
1999	Outstanding Special Visual Effects for a Series	John Allardice, Robert Bonchune, Eric Chauvin, Arthur J. Codron, Dan Curry, Don Greenberg, Sherry Hitch, Greg Rainoff, Mitch Suskin, John Teska, Ron Thornton	"Timeless"	Nominated
2000	Outstanding Costumes for a Series	Robert Blackman, Carol Kunz	"Muse"	Nominated
2000	Outstanding Hairstyling for a Series	Gloria Montemayor, Viviane Normand, Charlotte Parker, Jo Ann Phillips, Josee Normand	"Dragon's Teeth"	Nominated
2000	Outstanding Makeup for a Series	Belinda Bryant, Ellis Burman, Suzanne Diaz, Tina Kalliongis-Hoffman, Jeff Lewis, David Quaschnick, James Rohland, Michael Westmore, Scott Wheeler, Natalie Wood	"Ashes to Ashes"	Nominated
2000	Outstanding Music Composition for a Series	Jay Chattaway	"Spirit Folk"	Nominated
2000	Outstanding Sound Editing for a Series	Dale Chaloukian, Jeff Gersh, Ashley Harvey, Masanobu Tomita, Gerry Sackman, William Wistrom, James Wolvington	"Equinox", Part II	Nominated
2000	Outstanding Special Visual Effects for a Series	Les Bernstein, Bruce Branit, Elizabeth Castro, Dan Curry, John Gross, Paul Hill, Jeremy Hunt, Fred Pienkos, Ronald B. Moore	"Life Line"	Nominated
2000	Outstanding Special Visual Effects for a Series	Bruce Branit, Elizabeth Castro, Dan Curry, John Gross, Paul Hill, Jeremy Hunt, Fred Pienkos, Ronald B. Moore, Greg Rainoff	"The Haunting of Deck Twelve"	Nominated
2001	Outstanding Costumes For A Series	Robert Blackman, Carol Kuntz	"Shattered"	Nominated
2001	Outstanding Hairstyling For A Series	Gloria Montemeyor, Josee Normand, Charlotte Parker	"Prophecy"	Nominated
2001	Outstanding Makeup For A Series	Belinda Bryant, Ellis Burman, Suzanne Diaz-Westmore, Earl Ellis, Tina Kalliongis-Hoffman, Jeffrey Lewis, Bradley Look, Joe Podnar, Dave Quaschnick, James Rohland, Karen Westerfield, Michael Westmore, Scott Wheeler, Natalie Wood	"The Void"	Nominated
2001	Outstanding Music Composition For A Series	Jay Chattaway	"Endgame"	Won
2001	Outstanding Music Composition For A Series	Dennis McCarthy	"Workforce", Part II	Nominated
2001	Outstanding Sound Editing For A Series	Dale Chaloukian, T. Ashley Harvey, Masanobu Tomita, Gerald Sackman, Bill Wistrom, Jim Wolvington	"Endgame"	Nominated
2001	Outstanding Special Visual Effects for a Series	Robert Bonchune, Eric Chauvin, Arthur Codron, Dan Curry, Steve Fong, Ronald B. Moore, Greg Rainoff, Mitch Suskin, John Teska	"Endgame"	Won
2001	Outstanding Special Visual Effects for a Series	Dan Curry, Paul Hill, David Lombardi, Brandon MacDougall, Ronald B. Moore, David Morton, Greg Rainoff, John Teska, Chad Zimmerman	"Workforce", Part I	Nominated

== Hollywood Makeup Artist and Hair Stylist Guild Awards ==
Year	Category	Nominee	Episode	Result
2000	Best Special Effects Makeup - Television (for a Single Episode of a Regular Series - Sitcom, Drama or Daytime)	Michael Westmore, Scott Wheeler, James Rohland, Ellis Burman, Jr.	"Dark Frontier"	Nominated
2000	Best Character Hair Styling - Television (for a Single Episode of a Regular Series - Sitcom, Drama or Daytime)	Josée Normand, Charlotte Parker, Gloria Montemayor	"Bride of Chaotica!"	Won
2000	Best Innovative Hair Styling - Television (for a Single Episode of a Regular Series - Sitcom, Drama or Daytime)	Josée Normand, Charlotte Parker, Gloria Montemayor	"Dragon's Teeth"	Won
2001	Best Period Makeup - Television (For a Single Episode of a Regular Series - Sitcom, Drama or Daytime)	Michael Westmore, Ellis Burman, Jr., Suzanne Diaz, Tina Hoffman, James Rohland, Scott Wheeler, Natalie Wood	"Fair Haven"	Nominated
2001	Best Innovative Hair Styling - Television (For a Single Episode of a Regular Series - Sitcom, Drama or Daytime)	Josée Normand, Charlotte Parker, Gloria Montemayor, Viviane Normand	"Tsunkatse"	Won
2002	Best Special Makeup Effects - Television (For a Single Episode of a Regular Series - Sitcom, Drama or Daytime)	Michael Westmore	"The Void"	Nominated

== Golden Satellite Awards ==
Year	Category	Nominee	Result
1998	Best Actress – Television Series Drama	Kate Mulgrew	Won
1999	Best Actress – Television Series Drama	Jeri Ryan	Won

== Peabody Awards ==
Year	Category	Nominee	Result
2023	Peabody Institutional Award	Star Trek franchise, all series	Won

== Saturn Awards ==
Year	Category	Nominee	Result
1998	Best Actress on Television	Kate Mulgrew	Won
1998	Best Actress on Television	Jeri Ryan	Nominated
1998	Best Network Television Series		Nominated
1999	Best Actress on Television	Kate Mulgrew	Nominated
1999	Best Actress on Television	Jeri Ryan	Nominated
1999	Best Network Television Series		Nominated
2000	Best Actress on Television	Kate Mulgrew	Nominated
2000	Best Supporting Actress on Television	Jeri Ryan	Nominated
2000	Best Supporting Actor on Television	Robert Picardo	Nominated
2001	Best Actress on Television	Kate Mulgrew	Nominated
2001	Best Supporting Actress on Television	Jeri Ryan	Won
2001	Best Network Television Series		Nominated
2002	Best Television DVD Release		Nominated
2005	Special Recognition Award to the Star Trek TV series		Won

== Other awards ==
Year	Award	Category	Nominee(s)	Episode	Result
1999	International Monitor Awards	Film Originated Television Series - Electronic Visual Effects	Digital Magic	"Thirty Days"	Won
1999	Youth in Film Awards	Best Performance in a TV Drama Series: Supporting Young Actress	Scarlett Pomers		Won

== See also ==
- List of Star Trek: The Original Series awards and nominations
- List of Star Trek: The Next Generation awards and nominations
- List of Star Trek: Deep Space Nine awards and nominations
- List of Star Trek: Enterprise awards and nominations
- List of Star Trek: Discovery awards and nominations
