= List of awards and nominations received by Star Trek: Enterprise =

Awards and nominations received by Star Trek: Enterprise
Awards and nominations
Award	Wins	Nominations
ASCAP Film and Television Music Awards	1	1
Emmy Awards	4	17
Hugo Award	0	2
Saturn Award	3	17
VES Award	2	4

Totals (Note: Certain award groups do not simply award one winner. They acknowledge several different recipients, have runners-up, and have third place. Since this is a specific recognition and is different from losing an award, runner-up mentions are considered wins in this award tally. For simplification and to avoid errors, each award in this list has been presumed to have had a prior nomination.)
- Wins: 10
- Nominations: 41

The following is the list of awards and nominations received by the American science fiction television series Star Trek: Enterprise.

== ASCAP Film and Television Music Awards ==
Year	Category	Nominee	Result
2002	Top Television Series	Paul Baillargeon, David Bell, Jay Chattaway, Dennis McCarthy, Diane Warren	Won

== Emmy Awards ==
The Emmy is a television production award considered the television equivalent to the Academy Award.

=== Creative Arts Emmy Awards ===
List of Creative Arts Emmy Awards and nominations received by Star Trek: Enterprise
Year	Category	Nominee	Episode	Result
2002	Outstanding Special Visual Effects For A Series	David Stipes, Adam Buckner, Paul Hill, Greg Rainoff, Adam Howard, John Gross, Steven Rogers, Fred Pienkos, Eddie Robison	"Breaking the Ice"	Nominated
2002	Outstanding Special Visual Effects For A Series	Dan Curry, Ronald B. Moore, Arthur Codron, Elizabeth Castro, Paul Hill, Steven Fong, Gregory Rainoff, Robert Bonchune, David Morton	"Broken Bow"	Won
2002	Outstanding Makeup For A Series (Prosthetic)	Michael Westmore, Art Anthony, Belinda Bryant, David DeLeon, Suzanne Diaz-Westmore, Earl Ellis, Jeff Lewis, Bradley M. Look, Joe Podnar, Karen Westerfield, June Westmore, Natalie Wood	"Broken Bow"	Nominated
2002	Outstanding Sound Editing For A Series	Bill Wistrom, James Wolvington, Ashley Harvey, Masanobu Tomita, Dale Chaloukian, Shaun Varney, Stephen M. Rowe, Hilda Hodges, Catherine Rose	"Broken Bow"	Nominated
2002	Outstanding Hairstyling For A Series	Michael Moore, Gloria Pasqua Casny, Roma Goddard, Laura Connolly, Cheri Ruff	"Two Days and Two Nights"	Won
2003	Outstanding Makeup For A Series (Prosthetic)	Michael Westmore, Steven E. Anderson, Art Anthony, Michael Burnett, Roxy D'Alonzo, Suzanne Diaz-Westmore, Earl Ellis, Ruth Haney, Barry Koper, Jeff Lewis, Bradley M. Look, Robert Maverick, Todd McIntosh, Joe Podnar, Judith Silverman Orr, Debbie Zoller	"Canamar"	Nominated
2003	Outstanding Music Composition For A Series (Dramatic Underscore)	Dennis McCarthy	"The Expanse"	Nominated
2003	Outstanding Special Visual Effects for a Series	Bruce Branit, Elizabeth Castro, Dan Curry, Eric Hance, Sean Scott, Paul Hill, Ronald B. Moore, Fred Pienkos, Greg Rainoff	"The Expanse"	Nominated
2003	Outstanding Special Visual Effects for a Series	Dan Curry, Pierre M. Drolet, Paul Hill, Armen Kevorkian, Ronald B. Moore, David Morton, Sean Scott, John M. Teska	"The Crossing"	Nominated
2003	Outstanding Special Visual Effects for a Series	Robert Bonchune, Arthur Codron, Pierre Drolet, Steve Fong, Koji Kuramura, Sean Scott, John Teska, Greg Rainoff, Mitch Suskin	"Dead Stop"	Nominated
2004	Outstanding Music Composition For A Series (Dramatic Underscore)	Velton Ray Bunch	"Similitude"	Won
2004	Outstanding Prosthetic Makeup For A Series, Miniseries, Movie Or A Special	Michael Westmore	"Zero Hour"	Nominated
2004	Outstanding Special Visual Effects for a Series	Elizabeth Castro, Dan Curry, Eric Hance, Paul Hill, Ronald B. Moore, Fred Pienkos, Greg Rainoff, Sean Scott, Chris Zapara	"Countdown"	Won
2004	Outstanding Special Visual Effects for a Series	Arthur Codron, Dan Curry, Pierre Drolet, Steve Fong, Sean Jackson, Koji Kuramura, Greg Rainoff, Mike Stetson, John Teska	"The Council"	Nominated
2005	Outstanding Hairstyling For A Series	Laura Connolly, Roma Goddard, Michael Moore	"In a Mirror, Darkly"	Nominated
2005	Outstanding Prosthetic Makeup For A Series, Miniseries, Movie Or A Special	Michael Westmore, Suzanne Diaz-Westmore, Earl Ellis, Garrett Immel, Jeffrey Lewis, Bradley Look	"United"	Nominated
2005	Outstanding Stunt Coordination	Vince Deadrick, Jr.	"Borderland", "Cold Station 12"	Nominated

== Hugo Awards ==
List of Hugo Awards and nominations received by Star Trek: Enterprise
Year	Category	Nominee	Episode	Result
2003	Best Dramatic Presentation, Short Form	James Contner, Chris Black, Rick Berman, Brannon Braga, Dan O'Shannon	"Carbon Creek"	Nominated
2003	Best Dramatic Presentation, Short Form	David Straiton, Rick Berman, Brannon Braga	"A Night in Sickbay"	Nominated

== Peabody Awards ==
Year	Category	Nominee	Result
2023	Peabody Institutional Award	The Star Trek franchise, all series	Won

== Saturn Awards ==
Awarded since 1972, the Saturn Awards is an annual accolade presented by the Academy of Science Fiction, Fantasy and Horror Films to honor science fiction and fantasy films and television shows. Star Trek: Enterprise has been nominated for seven awards, and won three of them. It was also awarded a Special Recognition Award for the work of all the Star Trek television series in 2005.

List of Saturn Awards and nominations received by Star Trek: Enterprise
Year	Category	Nominee	Result
2001	Best Network Television Series		Nominated
2001	Best Actor on Television	Scott Bakula	Nominated
2001	Best Supporting Actor on Television	Connor Trinneer	Nominated
2001	Best Supporting Actress on Television	Jolene Blalock	Won
2001	Faces of the Future	Jolene Blalock	Won
2002	Best Network Television Series		Nominated
2002	Best Actor on Television	Scott Bakula	Nominated
2002	Best Supporting Actor on Television	Connor Trinneer	Nominated
2002	Best Supporting Actress on Television	Jolene Blalock	Nominated
2003	Best Network Television Series		Nominated
2003	Best Actor on Television	Scott Bakula	Nominated
2003	Best Supporting Actor on Television	Connor Trinneer	Nominated
2003	Best Supporting Actress on Television	Jolene Blalock	Nominated
2004	Best Network Television Series		Nominated
2004	Best Actor on Television	Scott Bakula	Nominated
2004	Best Supporting Actress on Television	Jolene Blalock	Nominated
2005	Special Recognition Award to the Star Trek TV series		Won

== Visual Effects Society Awards ==
List of Visual Effects Society Awards and nominations received by Star Trek: Enterprise
Year	Category	Nominee	Episode	Result
2002	Best Visual Effects in a Television Series	Dan Curry, Ronald D. Moore, Liz Castro	"Shockwave" (part one)	Nominated
2002	Best Models and Miniatures in a Televised Program, Music Video, or Commercial	John Teska, Koji Kuramura, Pierre Drolet, Sean Scott	"Dead Stop"	Won
2004	Outstanding Created Environment in a Live Action Broadcast Program	Pierre Drolet, Fred Pienkos, Eddie Robison, Sean Scott	"Storm Front" (part two)	Nominated
2004	Outstanding Visual Effects in a Broadcast Series	Ronald D. Moore, Dan Curry, David Takemura, Fred Pienkos	"Storm Front" (part two)	Won

== See also ==
- List of Star Trek: The Original Series awards and nominations
- List of Star Trek: The Next Generation awards and nominations
- List of Star Trek: Deep Space Nine awards and nominations
- List of Star Trek: Voyager awards and nominations
- List of Star Trek: Discovery awards and nominations
