= List of awards and nominations received by Star Trek: Deep Space Nine =

Awards and nominations received by American science fiction television series

Awards and nominations received by Star Trek: Deep Space Nine
Awards and nominations
Award	Wins	Nominations
ASCAP Film and Television Music Awards	3	3
American Society of Cinematographers, USA	0	1
Art Directors Guild	1	1
Emmy Award	4	32
Hugo Award	1	2
Image Awards	0	2
International Monitor Awards	1	1
Motion Picture Sound Editors, USA	1	5
Satellite Awards	0	1
Saturn Award	1	8
Sci-Fi Universe Magazine	1	1
Young Artist Awards	0	2
YoungStar Awards	0	1

Totals (Note: Certain award groups do not simply award one winner. They acknowledge several different recipients, have runners-up, and have third place. Since this is a specific recognition and is different from losing an award, runner-up mentions are considered wins in this award tally. For simplification and to avoid errors, each award in this list has been presumed to have had a prior nomination.)
- Wins: 13
- Nominations: 60

The following is the list of awards and nominations received by the American science fiction television series Star Trek: Deep Space Nine.

== ASCAP Film and Television Music Awards ==
Year	Category	Nominee	Result
1996	Top TV Series	Jay Chattaway, Dennis McCarthy	Won
1997	Top TV Series	Jay Chattaway, Dennis McCarthy	Won
1998	Top TV Series	Jay Chattaway, Dennis McCarthy	Won

== American Society of Cinematographers, USA ==
Year	Category	Nominee	Episode	Result
1995	Outstanding Achievement in Cinematography in Regular Series	Chris Haire, Doug Davey, Richard L. Morrison, Alan Bernard	"Crossover"	Nominated

== Art Directors Guild ==
Year	Category	Nominee	Episode	Result
1997	Excellence in Production Design Award	Herman F. Zimmerman, Randall McIlvain	-	Won

== Emmy Award ==
Year	Category	Nominee	Episode	Result
1993	Outstanding Individual Achievement in Main Title Theme Music	Dennis McCarthy	—	Won
1993	Outstanding Individual Achievement in Makeup for a Series	Michael Westmore, Jill Rockow, Karen Westerfield, Gilbert A. Mosko, Dean Jones, Michael Key, Craig Reardon, Vincent Niebla	Captive Pursuit	Won
1993	Outstanding Individual Achievement in Special Visual Effects	Robert Legato, Gary Hutzel, Dallas Gibson, Michael, Dennis Blakey	Emissary	Won
1993	Outstanding Individual Achievement in Art Direction for a Series	Herman F. Zimmerman, Randall McIlvain, Mickey S. Michaels	Emissary	Nominated
1993	Outstanding Individual Achievement in Hairstyling for a Series	Candace Neal, Ronald W. Smith, Gerald Solomon, Susan Zietlow-Maust	Move Along Home	Nominated
1993	Outstanding Individual Achievement in Sound Mixing for a Drama Series	William Gocke, Chris Haire, Richard L. Morrison, Doug Davey	Emissary, part II	Nominated
1994	Outstanding Individual Achievement in Hairstyling for a Series	Josée Normand, Ronald W. Smith, Norma Lee, Gerald Solomon	Armageddon Game	Nominated
1994	Outstanding Individual Achievement in Makeup for a Series	Michael Westmore, Camille Calvet, Karen Westerfield, Dean Gates, Dean Jones, Tina Hoffman, David Quashnick, Mike Smithson, Hank Edds, Michael Key, Gilbert A. Mosko	Rules of Acquisition	Nominated
1995	Outstanding Individual Achievement in Makeup for a Series	Michael Westmore, Camille Calvet, Dean Jones, Dean Gates, Karen Iverson, Scott Wheeler, Michael Key, David Quashnick, Karen Westerfield, Gilbert A. Mosko, Thomas E. Surprenant	Distant Voices	Won
1995	Outstanding Individual Achievement - Special Visual Effects	Glenn Neufeld, David Takemura, Erik Nash, Joshua Cushner, Les Bernstien, Adam Howard, Patrick Clancey, Don Lee	The Jem'Hadar	Nominated
1995	Outstanding Individual Achievement in Hairstyling for a Series	Josée Normand, Norma Lee, Ronald W. Smith, Gerald Solomon, Michael Moore, Chris McBee, Caryl Codon-Tharp, Faith Vecchio, Rebecca De Morrio, Joan Phillips	Improbable Cause	Nominated
1996	Outstanding Individual Achievement in Costume Design for a Series	Robert Blackman	The Muse	Nominated
1996	Outstanding Individual Achievement in Hairstyling for a Series	Shirley Dolle, Huffman, Cherie, Lee Crawford, Brian A. Tunstall, Ellen Powell, Susan Zietlow-Maust, Barbara Ronci	Our Man Bashir	Nominated
1996	Outstanding Individual Achievement in Makeup for a Series	Camille Calvet, Michael Westmore, Dean Jones, Karen Iverson, Mark Bussan, Scott Wheeler, Gilbert A. Mosko, Ellis Burman Jr., David Quashnick, Thomas E. Surprenant, R. Stephen Weber, Brad Look, Kevin Haney	The Visitor	Nominated
1996	Outstanding Individual Achievement in Music Composition for a Series	Jay Chattaway	Our Man Bashir	Nominated
1996	Outstanding Individual Achievement in Special Visual Effects	Joshua Cushner, Judy Elkins, Steve Fong, Dennis Hoerter, Adam Howard, Gary Hutzel, Don Lee, Fredric Meininger, Glenn Neufeld, Scott Rader, Jim Rider, Joshua D. Rose	The Way Of The Warrior	Nominated
1997	Outstanding Art Direction for a Series	Herman F. Zimmerman, Randall McIlvain, Laura Richarz	Trials and Tribble-ations	Nominated
1997	Outstanding Cinematography for a Series	Jonathan West	Apocalypse Rising	Nominated
1997	Outstanding Hairstyling for a Series	Norma Lee, Brian A. Tunstall, Jacklin Masteran, Linle White, Francine Shermaine, Caryl Codon-Tharp, Susan Zietlow-Maust, Charlotte Harvey	Trials and Tribble-ations	Nominated
1997	Outstanding Makeup for a Series	Camille Calvet, Michael Westmore, Karen Iverson, Ellis Burman Jr., R. Stephen Weber, David Quashnick, Dean Jones, Mark Bussan, Brad Look, Belinda Bryant, James MacKinnon, Allan A. Apone, Perri Sorel, Mary Kay Morse, John Maldonado, Lisa Collins, Karen Westerfield	Apocalypse Rising	Nominated
1997	Outstanding Special Visual Effects	Gary Hutzel, Judy Elkins, Paul Maples, Adrian Hurley, Steve Fong, Davy Nethercutt, Kevin Bouchez, Laurie Resnick, Adam Howard, Gregory Jein	Trials And Tribble-ations	Nominated
1998	Outstanding Art Direction for a Series	Herman F. Zimmerman, Randall McIlvain, Laura Richarz	Far Beyond The Stars	Nominated
1998	Outstanding Costume Design for a Series	Robert Blackman	Far Beyond The Stars	Nominated
1998	Outstanding Hairstyling for a Series	Norma Lee, Brian A. Tunstall, Rebecca De Morrio, Darlis Chefalo, Gloria Pasqua Casny, Kathrine Gordon, Hazel Catmull, Ruby Ford, Louisa V. Anthony, Barbara Ronci, Suzan Bagdadi, JoAnn Stafford-Chaney	Far Beyond The Stars	Nominated
1998	Outstanding Makeup for a Series	Camille Calvet, Michael Westmore, Dean Jones, Karen Iverson, Mark Bussan, Ellis Burman Jr., Karen Westerfield, Mary Kay Morse, Belinda Bryant, Joe Podnar, Suzanne Diaz, Jill Rockow, David Quashnick, Bernd Rantscheff	Who Mourns For Morn	Nominated
1998	Outstanding Music Direction	Jay Chattaway	His Way	Nominated
1998	Outstanding Special Visual Effects for a Series	Gary Hutzel, Judy Elkins, Gary Monak, Paul Maples, Adrian Hurley, Steve Bowen, Steve Fong, Davy Nethercutt, Kevin Bouchez, Laurie Resnick, Fredric Meininger	One Little Ship	Nominated
1999	Outstanding Art Direction for a Series	Herman F. Zimmerman, Randall McIlvain, Laura Richarz	Prodigal Daughter	Nominated
1999	Outstanding Hairstyling for a Series	Norma Lee, Brian A. Tunstall, Gloria Pasqua Casny, Rebecca De Morrio, Laura Connolly, Lauran Upshaw, Frank Fontaine, Tim Jones, Susan Zietlow-Maust, Angela Gurule, Gloria Ponce, Virginia Grobeson, Linda Leiter Sharp	Badda-Bing Badda-Bang	Nominated
1999	Outstanding Makeup for a Series	Camille Calvet, Michael Westmore, Dean Jones, Mark Bussan, Mary Kay Morse, Ellis Burman Jr., Belinda Bryant, Karen Iverson, Karen Westerfield, Brad Look, David Quashnick, Earl Ellis, Joe Podnar, R. Stephen Weber, Jeff Lewis, Sandra Rowden, Toby Lamm, Michael F. Blake, June Westmore, Judith Silverman, Craig Smith, Kevin Haney, Suzanne Diaz, Scott Wheeler, James Rohland, Tina Hoffman, Natalie Wood	Dogs of War	Nominated
1999	Outstanding Special Visual Effects for a Series	Dan Curry, Gary Hutzel, David Stipes, Adam Buckner, Arthur J. Codron, Judy Elkins, Gary Monak, Paul Maples, Steve Fong, Don Greenberg, Paul Hill, Davy Nethercutt, Kevin Bouchez, Gregory Rainoff, Adam Howard, Larry Younger, Sherry Hitch, Rob Bonchune, David Lombardi	What You Leave Behind	Nominated

== Hugo Awards ==
Year	Category	Episode	Result
1996	Best Dramatic Presentation	"The Visitor"	Nominated
1997	Best Dramatic Presentation	"Trials and Tribble-ations"	Nominated

== Image Awards ==
Year	Category	Nominee	Result
1996	Outstanding Lead Actor in a Drama Series	Avery Brooks	Nominated
1997	Outstanding Lead Actor in a Drama Series	Avery Brooks	Nominated

== International Monitor Awards ==
Year	Category	Nominee	Episode	Result
1998	Film Originated Television Series - Electronic Visual Effects	David Stipes, Dan Curry, Adam Buckner, Steve Fong, Kevin Bouchez, Davy Nethercutt, Don Greenberg	"Call to Arms"	Won

== Motion Picture Sound Editors, USA ==
Year	Category	Nominee	Episode	Result
1993	Best Sound Editing - ADR	Ashley Harvey	Captive Pursuit	Won
1993	Best Sound Editing - Dialogue	Ashley Harvey	Captive Pursuit	Nominated
1994	Best Sound Editing - Television Episodic - Dialogue & ADR	Paul Tade, Ashley Harvey	The Jem Hadar	Nominated
1995	Best Sound Editing - ADR	Ashley Harvey	Visionary	Nominated
1995	Best Sound Editing - Dialogue	Ashley Harvey, Jivan Tahmizian	The Way of the Warrior	Nominated

== Peabody Awards ==
Year	Category	Nominee	Result
2023	Peabody Institutional Award	The Star Trek franchise, all series	Won

== Satellite Awards ==
Year	Category	Episode	Result
2004	Best DVD Release of TV Shows	For Season 7	Nominated

== Saturn Award ==
Year	Category	Nominee	Result
1994	Best Genre Television Series	-	Nominated
1996	Best Genre Television Series	-	Nominated
1997	Best Genre TV Actor	Avery Brooks	Nominated
1998	Best Genre Cable/Syndicated Series	-	Nominated
1999	Best Genre Cable/Syndicated Series	-	Nominated
2000	Best Syndicated Television Series	-	Nominated
2004	Best DVD Television Release	-	Nominated
2005	Special Recognition Award to the Star Trek TV series	-	Won

== Sci-Fi Universe Magazine ==
Year	Category	Nominee	Result
1995	Best Supporting Actress in a Genre TV Series	Nana Visitor	Won

== Young Artist Awards ==
Year	Category	Nominee	Result
1996	Best Performance by a Young Actor - Guest Starring Role TV Series	Richard Lee Jackson	Nominated
1996	Best Performance by a Young Actor - TV Drama Series	Cirroc Lofton	Nominated

== YoungStar Awards ==
Year	Category	Nominee	Result
1997	Best Performance by a Young Actor in a Drama TV Series	Cirroc Lofton	Nominated

== See also ==
- List of Star Trek: The Original Series awards and nominations
- List of Star Trek: The Next Generation awards and nominations
- List of Star Trek: Voyager awards and nominations
- List of Star Trek: Enterprise awards and nominations
- List of Star Trek: Discovery awards and nominations
