= Edna Sheen =

American make-up artist (1943–2012)

- Born: Edna Mae Sheen; November 18, 1943; Los Angeles, California, U.S.
- Died: January 20, 2012 (aged 68)
- Occupation: Make-up artist

Edna Mae Sheen (November 18, 1943 – January 20, 2012) was an American make-up artist whose credits includes Philadelphia and Courage Under Fire, starring Denzel Washington. She also worked on television, notably for Family Matters.

In 2005, she was nominated for a Primetime Emmy Award in the category Outstanding Makeup for her work on the television film Lackawanna Blues. Her nomination was shared with Denise Pugh-Ruiz and Karen Westerfield.

Sheen died on January 20, 2012, at the age of 68.
