= 26th Saturn Awards =

US film and television award ceremony

- Date: June 6, 2000
- Site: California, U.S.

Highlights
- Most awards: The Green Mile (3)
- Most nominations: Sleepy Hollow (11)

The 26th Saturn Awards, honoring the best in science fiction, fantasy and horror film and television in 1999, were held on June 6, 2000.

Below is a complete list of nominees and winners. Winners are highlighted in bold.

== Winners and nominees ==
Source needed. The reference listed below, which is the official Saturn Awards webpage, does not list the nominees for the year.

=== Film ===
Best Actor	Best Actress
**Tim Allen - Galaxy Quest as Jason Nesmith**; Johnny Depp - Sleepy Hollow as Ichabod Crane; Brendan Fraser - The Mummy as Rick O'Connell; Liam Neeson - Star Wars: Episode I – The Phantom Menace as Qui-Gon Jinn; Keanu Reeves - The Matrix as Neo; Bruce Willis - The Sixth Sense as Dr. Malcolm Crowe	**Christina Ricci - Sleepy Hollow as Katrina Van Tassel**; Heather Graham - Austin Powers: The Spy Who Shagged Me as Felicity Shagwell; Catherine Keener - Being John Malkovich as Maxine Lund; Carrie-Anne Moss - The Matrix as Trinity; Sigourney Weaver - Galaxy Quest as Gwen DeMarco; Rachel Weisz - The Mummy as Evelyn Carnahan
Best Supporting Actor	Best Supporting Actress
**Michael Clarke Duncan - The Green Mile as John Coffey**; Laurence Fishburne - The Matrix as Morpheus; Jude Law - The Talented Mr. Ripley as Dickie Greenleaf; Ewan McGregor - Star Wars: Episode I – The Phantom Menace as Obi-Wan Kenobi; Alan Rickman - Galaxy Quest as Alexander Dane; Christopher Walken - Sleepy Hollow as The Headless Horseman	**Patricia Clarkson - The Green Mile as Melinda Moores**; Pernilla August - Star Wars: Episode I – The Phantom Menace as Shmi Skywalker; Joan Cusack - Arlington Road as Cheryl Lang/Fenimore; Geena Davis - Stuart Little as Eleanor Little; Miranda Richardson - Sleepy Hollow as Lady Mary Van Tassel; Sissy Spacek - Blast from the Past as Helen Webber
Best Young Actor/Actress	Best Director
**Haley Joel Osment - The Sixth Sense as Cole Sear**; Emily Bergl - The Rage: Carrie 2 as Rachel Lang; Jake Lloyd - Star Wars: Episode I – The Phantom Menace as Anakin Skywalker; Justin Long - Galaxy Quest as Brandon; Natalie Portman - Star Wars: Episode I – The Phantom Menace as Queen Padmé Amidala; Devon Sawa - Idle Hands as Anton Tobias	**The Wachowskis - The Matrix**; Tim Burton - Sleepy Hollow; Frank Darabont - The Green Mile; George Lucas - Star Wars: Episode I – The Phantom Menace; Dean Parisot - Galaxy Quest; Stephen Sommers - The Mummy
Best Writing	Best Costumes
**Charlie Kaufman - Being John Malkovich**; Ehren Kruger - Arlington Road; M. Night Shyamalan - The Sixth Sense; Stephen Sommers - The Mummy; The Wachowskis - The Matrix; Andrew Kevin Walker - Sleepy Hollow	**Trisha Biggar - Star Wars: Episode I – The Phantom Menace**; Colleen Atwood - Sleepy Hollow; Kym Barrett - The Matrix; John Bloomfield - The Mummy; Marilyn Vance - Mystery Men; Albert Wolsky - Galaxy Quest
Best Special Effects	Best Music
**Star Wars: Episode I – The Phantom Menace**; Galaxy Quest; The Matrix; The Mummy; Sleepy Hollow; Stuart Little	**Danny Elfman - Sleepy Hollow**; Jerry Goldsmith - The Mummy; David Newman - Galaxy Quest; Randy Newman - Toy Story 2; Thomas Newman - The Green Mile; Michael Nyman, Damon Albarn - Ravenous
Best Fantasy Film	Best Horror Film
**Being John Malkovich**; Austin Powers: The Spy Who Shagged Me; The Mummy; Stuart Little; Tarzan; Toy Story 2	**The Sixth Sense**; The Blair Witch Project; Ravenous; Sleepy Hollow; Stigmata; Teaching Mrs. Tingle
Best Science Fiction Film	Best Action/Adventure/Thriller Film
**The Matrix**; Existenz; Galaxy Quest; Pitch Black; Star Wars: Episode I – The Phantom Menace; The Thirteenth Floor	**The Green Mile**; Arlington Road; October Sky; Payback; The Talented Mr. Ripley; The World Is Not Enough
Best Make-Up	Best Home Video Release
**The Mummy**; Galaxy Quest; The Matrix; Ravenous; Sleepy Hollow; Star Wars: Episode I – The Phantom Menace	**Free Enterprise**; From Dusk till Dawn 3: The Hangman's Daughter; The Iron Giant; The Stendhal Syndrome; Trekkies

=== Television ===
==== Programs ====
Best Network Television Series	Best Syndicated/Cable Television Series
**Now and Again (CBS)**; Angel (The WB); Buffy the Vampire Slayer (The WB); Roswell (The WB); Seven Days (UPN); The X-Files (Fox)	**Stargate SG-1 (Showtime)**; Amazon (Syndicated); Farscape (Sci-Fi); G vs E (Syndicated); The Outer Limits (Showtime); Star Trek: Deep Space Nine (Syndicated)
Best Single Television Presentation
**Storm of the Century (ABC)**; Animal Farm (TNT); A Christmas Carol (TNT); Journey to the Center of the Earth (USA Network); The Magical Legend of the Leprechauns (NBC); Time Shifters (TBS)

==== Acting ====
Best Television Actor	Best Television Actress
**David Boreanaz - Angel (The WB) as Angel**; Richard Dean Anderson - Stargate SG-1 (Showtime) as Jack O'Neill; Jason Behr - Roswell (The WB) as Max Evans; Ben Browder - Farscape (Sci-Fi) as John Crichton; Eric Close - Now and Again (CBS) as Michael Wiseman; Patrick Stewart - A Christmas Carol (TNT) as Ebenezer Scrooge	**Margaret Colin - Now and Again (CBS) as Lisa Wiseman**; Gillian Anderson - The X-Files (Fox) as Dana Scully; Claudia Black - Farscape (Sci-Fi) as Aeryn Sun; Shannen Doherty - Charmed (The WB) as Prue Halliwell; Sarah Michelle Gellar - Buffy the Vampire Slayer (The WB) as Buffy Summers; Kate Mulgrew - Star Trek: Voyager (UPN) as Kathryn Janeway
Best Supporting Television Actor	Best Supporting Television Actress
**Dennis Haysbert - Now and Again (CBS) as Theodore Morris**; Nicholas Brendon - Buffy the Vampire Slayer (The WB) as Xander Harris; Colm Feore - Storm of the Century (ABC) as Andre Linoge; Jeremy London - Journey to the Center of the Earth (USA Network) as Jonas Lytton; James Marsters - Buffy the Vampire Slayer (The WB) as Spike; Robert Picardo - Star Trek: Voyager (UPN) as The Doctor	**Justina Vail - Seven Days (UPN) as Olga Vukavitch**; Charisma Carpenter - Angel (The WB) as Cordelia Chase; Virginia Hey - Farscape (Sci-Fi) as Pa'u Zotoh Zhaan; Heather Matarazzo - Now and Again (CBS) as Heather Wiseman; Jeri Ryan - Star Trek: Voyager (UPN) as Seven of Nine; Amanda Tapping - Stargate SG-1 (Showtime) as Samantha Carter

== Special Awards ==
- Jeff Walker

=== George Pal Memorial Award ===
- **Douglas Wick**

=== Life Career Award ===
- **Dick Van Dyke**
- **George Barris**

=== President's Award ===
- **Richard Donner**
