= 37th Saturn Awards =

US film and television award ceremony

- Date: June 23, 2011
- Site: Burbank, California, U.S.

Highlights
- Most awards: Inception (5)
- Most nominations: Inception (9)

The 37th Saturn Awards, honoring the best in science fiction, fantasy and horror film and television in 2010 were held on June 23, 2011.

== Winners and nominees ==
=== Film ===
Best Science Fiction Film	Best Fantasy Film
Inception: Hereafter; Iron Man 2; Never Let Me Go; Splice; Tron: Legacy	Alice in Wonderland: The Chronicles of Narnia: The Voyage of the Dawn Treader; Clash of the Titans; Harry Potter and the Deathly Hallows – Part 1; Scott Pilgrim vs. The World; The Twilight Saga: Eclipse
Best Horror or Thriller Film	Best Action or Adventure Film
Let Me In: The American; Black Swan; Kick-Ass; Shutter Island; The Wolfman	Salt: The Expendables; The Green Hornet; Red; Robin Hood; True Grit; Unstoppable
Best Actor	Best Actress
Jeff Bridges - Tron: Legacy as Kevin Flynn: George Clooney - The American as Jack; Leonardo DiCaprio - Inception as Dom Cobb; Leonardo DiCaprio - Shutter Island as Edward "Teddy" Daniels; Robert Downey Jr. - Iron Man 2 as Tony Stark / Iron Man; Ryan Reynolds - Buried as Paul Conroy	Natalie Portman - Black Swan as Nina Sayers: Cecile De France - Hereafter as Marie Lelay; Angelina Jolie - Salt as Evelyn Salt; Carey Mulligan - Never Let Me Go as Kathy; Elliot Page - Inception as Ariadne; Noomi Rapace - The Girl with the Dragon Tattoo as Lisbeth Salander
Best Supporting Actor	Best Supporting Actress
Andrew Garfield - Never Let Me Go as Tommy: Christian Bale - The Fighter as Dicky Eklund; Tom Hardy - Inception as Eames; Garrett Hedlund - Tron: Legacy as Samuel "Sam" Flynn; John Malkovich - Red as Marvin Boggs; Mark Ruffalo - Shutter Island as Chuck Aule	Mila Kunis - Black Swan as Lily: Scarlett Johansson - Iron Man 2 as Natasha Romanoff / Black Widow; Keira Knightley - Never Let Me Go as Ruth; Helen Mirren - Red as Victoria Winslow; Vanessa Redgrave - Letters to Juliet as Claire; Jacki Weaver - Animal Kingdom as Janine "Smurf" Cody
Best Performance by a Younger Actor	Best Director
Chloë Grace Moretz - Let Me In as Abby: Logan Lerman - Percy Jackson & the Olympians: The Lightning Thief as Percy Jackson; Frankie and George McLaren - Hereafter as Jason and Marcus; Kodi Smit-McPhee - Let Me In as Owen; Will Poulter - The Chronicles of Narnia: The Voyage of the Dawn Treader as Eustace Scrubb; Hailee Steinfeld - True Grit as Mattie Ross; Charlie Tahan - Charlie St. Cloud as Sam St. Cloud	Christopher Nolan - Inception: Darren Aronofsky - Black Swan; Clint Eastwood - Hereafter; Matt Reeves - Let Me In; Martin Scorsese - Shutter Island; David Yates - Harry Potter and the Deathly Hallows – Part 1
Best Writing	Best Music
Christopher Nolan - Inception: Michael Arndt - Toy Story 3; Alex Garland - Never Let Me Go; Mark Heyman, Andres Heinz, John McLaughlin - Black Swan; Peter Morgan - Hereafter; Matt Reeves - Let Me In	Hans Zimmer - Inception: Daft Punk - Tron: Legacy; Clint Eastwood - Hereafter; Michael Giacchino - Let Me In; Gottfried Huppertz - The Complete Metropolis; John Powell - How to Train Your Dragon
Best Costume	Best Make-up
Alice in Wonderland: The Wolfman; The Chronicles of Narnia: The Voyage of the Dawn Treader; Harry Potter and the Deathly Hallows – Part 1; Tron: Legacy; Robin Hood	The Wolfman: Splice; Repo Men; Let Me In; Harry Potter and the Deathly Hallows – Part 1; Alice in Wonderland
Best Production Design	Best Special Effects
Tron: Legacy: How to Train Your Dragon; Shutter Island; The Wolfman; Inception; Alice in Wonderland	Inception: Tron: Legacy; The Chronicles of Narnia: The Voyage of the Dawn Treader; Harry Potter and the Deathly Hallows – Part 1; Alice in Wonderland; Iron Man 2
Best International Film	Best Animated Film
Monsters: The Complete Metropolis; Centurion; The Girl with the Dragon Tattoo; Mother; Rare Exports: A Christmas Tale	Toy Story 3: Despicable Me; How to Train Your Dragon; Legend of the Guardians: The Owls of Ga'Hoole; Shrek Forever After; Tangled

=== Television ===
==== Programs ====
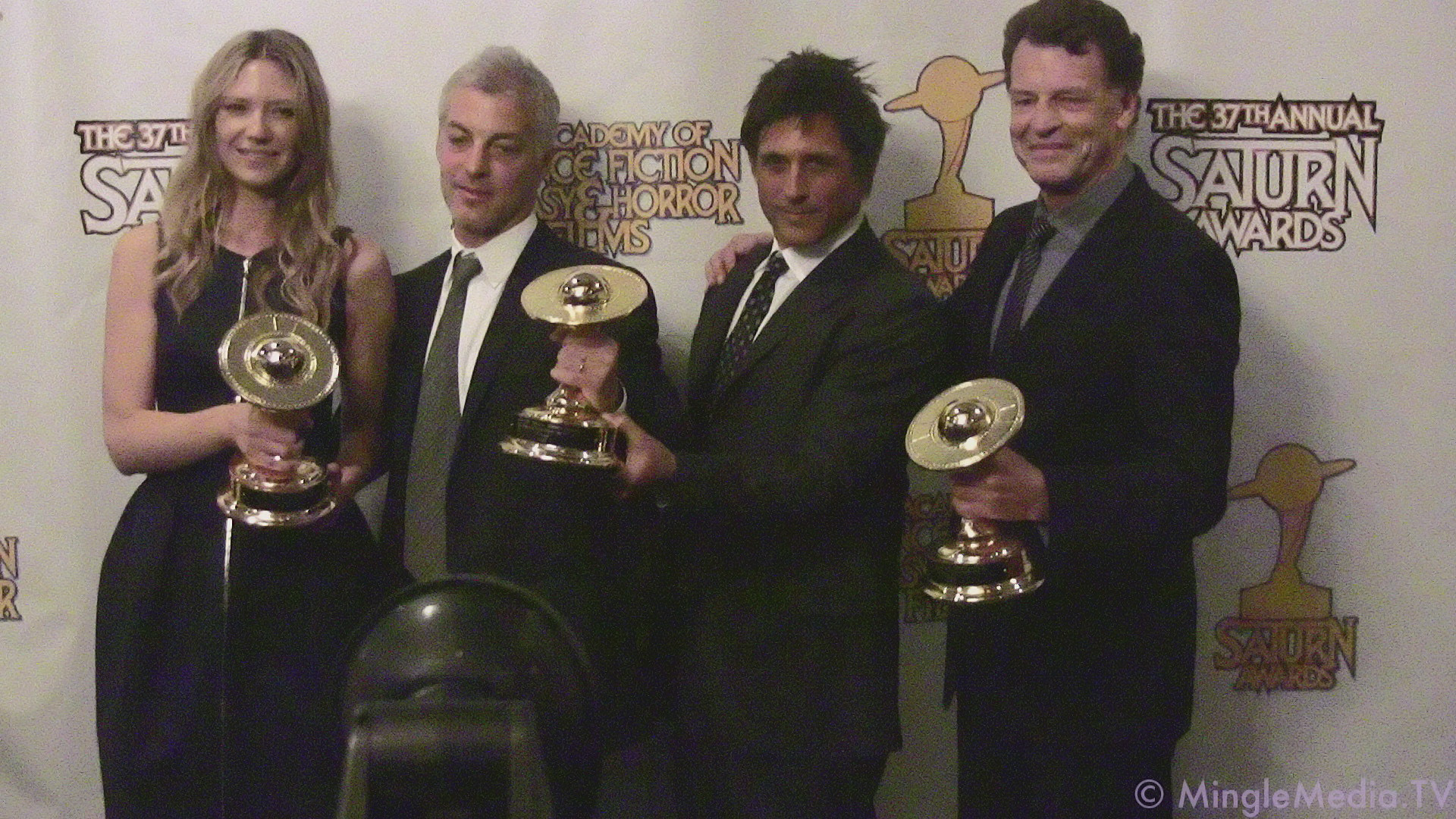
The cast and crew of Fringe display their Saturn Awards.

Best Network Television Series	Best Syndicated/Cable Television Series
Fringe (Fox); Lost (ABC); Smallville (The CW); Supernatural (The CW); V (ABC); The Vampire Diaries (The CW)	Breaking Bad (AMC); The Closer (TNT); Dexter (Showtime); Eureka (Syfy); Leverage (TNT); Spartacus: Blood and Sand (Starz); True Blood (HBO)
Best Television Presentation
The Walking Dead (AMC); Doctor Who: "A Christmas Carol" (BBC America); Kung Fu Panda Holiday Special (NBC); The Pillars of the Earth (Starz); Sherlock (PBS); Spartacus: Gods of the Arena (Starz)

==== Acting ====
Best Actor on Television	Best Actress on Television
Stephen Moyer - True Blood (HBO) as Bill Compton; Bryan Cranston - Breaking Bad (AMC) as Walter White; Matthew Fox - Lost (ABC) as Jack Shephard; Michael C. Hall - Dexter (Showtime) as Dexter Morgan; Timothy Hutton - Leverage (TNT) as Nathan Ford; Andrew Lincoln - The Walking Dead (AMC) as Rick Grimes	Anna Torv - Fringe (Fox) as Olivia Dunham; Sarah Wayne Callies - The Walking Dead (AMC) as Lori Grimes; Erica Durance - Smallville (The CW) as Lois Lane; Elizabeth Mitchell - V (ABC) as Erica Evans; Anna Paquin - True Blood (HBO) as Sookie Stackhouse; Kyra Sedgwick - The Closer (TNT) as Brenda Leigh Johnson
Best Supporting Actor on Television	Best Supporting Actress on Television
John Noble - Fringe (Fox) as Walter Bishop; Michael Emerson - Lost (ABC) as Benjamin Linus; Dean Norris - Breaking Bad (AMC) as Hank Schrader; Terry O'Quinn - Lost (ABC) as John Locke; Aaron Paul - Breaking Bad (AMC) as Jesse Pinkman; Lance Reddick - Fringe (Fox) as Phillip Broyles; Steven Yeun - The Walking Dead (AMC) as Glenn Rhee	Lucy Lawless - Spartacus: Blood and Sand (Starz) as Lucretia; Morena Baccarin - V (ABC) as Anna; Gina Bellman - Leverage (TNT) as Sophie Devereaux; Jennifer Carpenter - Dexter (Showtime) as Debra Morgan; Laurie Holden - The Walking Dead (AMC) as Andrea; Beth Riesgraf - Leverage (TNT) as Parker
Best Guest Performer on Television
Richard Dreyfuss - Weeds (Showtime) as Warren Schiff (tie); Joe Manganiello - True Blood (HBO) as Alcide Herveaux (tie); Noah Emmerich - The Walking Dead (AMC) as Edwin Jenner; Giancarlo Esposito - Breaking Bad (AMC) as Gus Fring; Seth Gabel - Fringe (Fox) as Lincoln Lee; John Terry - Lost (ABC) as Christian Shephard

=== DVD Releases ===
Best DVD Release	Best Special Edition DVD Release
Never Sleep Again: The Elm Street Legacy: The Disappearance of Alice Creed; District 13: Ultimatum; The Good Heart; The New Daughter; The Square	Avatar (Extended Collector's Edition): Monsters (Special Edition); Red Cliff (International Version); Robin Hood (Unrated Director's Cut); Salt (Deluxe Unrated Edition); The Wolf Man (Unrated Director's Cut)
Best Classic Film DVD Release	Best DVD Collection
The Complete Metropolis: Cronos; The Exorcist (Extended Director's Cut); King Kong; Pandora and the Flying Dutchman (Deluxe Edition); Psycho (50th Anniversary Edition)	Alien Anthology: Back to the Future 25th Anniversary Trilogy; Clint Eastwood 35 Films 35 Years at Warner Bros.; Fantomas: Five Film Collection; Film Noir Classic Collection, Volume 5; Vengeance Trilogy
Best DVD Television Release
The Twilight Zone (Season 1 & 2) (Blu-ray): Lost: The Complete Sixth and Final Season; The Six Million Dollar Man (The Complete Collection); Space 1999: The Complete Season One (Blu-ray); Thriller: The Complete Series; Voyage to the Bottom of the Sea (Season 4, Volume 2)
