= Saturn Award for Best Syndicated/Cable Television Series =

Former annual US media award

The Saturn Award for Best Syndicated/Cable Television Series was presented annually by the Academy of Science Fiction, Fantasy and Horror Films, honoring the best syndicated or cable television series. It was first introduced in 1996 and discontinued in 2015 when the Saturn Awards went through major changes in their television categories.

Battlestar Galactica, Breaking Bad, Stargate SG-1, and The Walking Dead hold the record of most wins in the category with three. Stargate SG-1 also had the most nominations with eleven.

== Winners and nominees ==
The following is a list of award winners and nominees. The winners are listed in bold.

(NOTE: Year refers to year of eligibility. The actual ceremonies were held the following year.)

=== 1990s ===
Year	Program	Network
1996 **(23rd)**	**The Outer Limits**	**Showtime**
1996 **(23rd)**	Babylon 5	Syndicated
1996 **(23rd)**	Highlander	Syndicated
1996 **(23rd)**	The New Adventures of Robin Hood	TNT
1996 **(23rd)**	Poltergeist: The Legacy	Showtime
1996 **(23rd)**	Star Trek: Deep Space Nine	Syndicated
1997 **(24th)**	**The Outer Limits**	**Showtime**
1997 **(24th)**	Babylon 5	Syndicated
1997 **(24th)**	Earth: Final Conflict	Syndicated
1997 **(24th)**	Star Trek: Deep Space Nine	Syndicated
1997 **(24th)**	Stargate SG-1	Showtime
1997 **(24th)**	Xena: Warrior Princess	Syndicated
1998 **(25th)**	**Babylon 5**	**TNT**
1998 **(25th)**	The Outer Limits	Showtime
1998 **(25th)**	PSI Factor	Syndicated
1998 **(25th)**	Sliders	Sci-Fi
1998 **(25th)**	Star Trek: Deep Space Nine	Syndicated
1998 **(25th)**	Stargate SG-1	Showtime
1999 **(26th)**	**Stargate SG-1**	**Showtime**
1999 **(26th)**	Amazon	Syndicated
1999 **(26th)**	Farscape	Sci-Fi
1999 **(26th)**	G vs E	USA Network
1999 **(26th)**	The Outer Limits	Showtime
1999 **(26th)**	Star Trek: Deep Space Nine	Syndicated

=== 2000s ===
Year	Program	Network
2000 **(27th)**	**Farscape**	**Sci-Fi**
2000 **(27th)**	Andromeda	Syndicated
2000 **(27th)**	Beastmaster	Syndicated
2000 **(27th)**	The Invisible Man	Sci-Fi
2000 **(27th)**	The Outer Limits	Showtime
2000 **(27th)**	Stargate SG-1	Showtime
2001 **(28th)**	**Farscape**	**Sci-Fi**
2001 **(28th)**	Andromeda	Syndicated
2001 **(28th)**	The Chronicle	Sci-Fi
2001 **(28th)**	The Invisible Man	Sci-Fi
2001 **(28th)**	Stargate SG-1	Showtime
2001 **(28th)**	Witchblade	TNT
2002 **(29th)**	**Farscape**	**Sci-Fi**
2002 **(29th)**	Andromeda	Syndicated
2002 **(29th)**	The Dead Zone	USA Network
2002 **(29th)**	Jeremiah	Showtime
2002 **(29th)**	Mutant X	Syndicated
2002 **(29th)**	Stargate SG-1	Sci-Fi
2003 **(30th)**	**Stargate SG-1**	**Sci-Fi**
2003 **(30th)**	Andromeda	Syndicated
2003 **(30th)**	Carnivàle	HBO
2003 **(30th)**	Dead Like Me	Showtime
2003 **(30th)**	The Dead Zone	USA Network
2003 **(30th)**	Farscape	Sci-Fi
2004 **(31st)**	**Stargate SG-1**	**Sci-Fi**
2004 **(31st)**	Dead Like Me	Showtime
2004 **(31st)**	The Dead Zone	USA Network
2004 **(31st)**	The 4400	USA Network
2004 **(31st)**	Nip/Tuck	FX
2004 **(31st)**	Stargate: Atlantis	Sci-Fi
2005 **(32nd)**	**Battlestar Galactica**	**Sci-Fi**
2005 **(32nd)**	The Closer	TNT
2005 **(32nd)**	The 4400	USA Network
2005 **(32nd)**	Nip/Tuck	FX
2005 **(32nd)**	Stargate: Atlantis	Sci-Fi
2005 **(32nd)**	Stargate SG-1	Sci-Fi
2006 **(33rd)**	**Battlestar Galactica**	**Sci-Fi**
2006 **(33rd)**	The Closer	TNT
2006 **(33rd)**	Dexter	Showtime
2006 **(33rd)**	Doctor Who	Sci-Fi
2006 **(33rd)**	Eureka	Sci-Fi
2006 **(33rd)**	Kyle XY	ABC Family
2006 **(33rd)**	Stargate SG-1	Sci-Fi
2007 **(34th)**	**Dexter**	**Showtime**
2007 **(34th)**	Battlestar Galactica	Sci-Fi
2007 **(34th)**	The Closer	TNT
2007 **(34th)**	Kyle XY	ABC Family
2007 **(34th)**	Saving Grace	TNT
2007 **(34th)**	Stargate SG-1	Sci-Fi
2008 **(35th)**	**Battlestar Galactica**	**Sci-Fi**
2008 **(35th)**	The Closer	TNT
2008 **(35th)**	Dexter	Showtime
2008 **(35th)**	Leverage	TNT
2008 **(35th)**	Star Wars: The Clone Wars	Cartoon Network
2008 **(35th)**	True Blood	HBO
2009 **(36th)**	**Breaking Bad**	**AMC**
2009 **(36th)**	Battlestar Galactica	Sci-Fi
2009 **(36th)**	The Closer	TNT
2009 **(36th)**	Dexter	Showtime
2009 **(36th)**	Leverage	TNT
2009 **(36th)**	True Blood	HBO

=== 2010s ===
Year	Program	Network
2010 **(37th)**	**Breaking Bad**	**AMC**
2010 **(37th)**	The Closer	TNT
2010 **(37th)**	Dexter	Showtime
2010 **(37th)**	Eureka	Syfy
2010 **(37th)**	Leverage	TNT
2010 **(37th)**	Spartacus: Blood and Sand	Starz
2010 **(37th)**	True Blood	HBO
2011 **(38th)**	**Breaking Bad**	**AMC**
2011 **(38th)**	American Horror Story: Murder House	FX
2011 **(38th)**	The Closer	TNT
2011 **(38th)**	Dexter	Showtime
2011 **(38th)**	The Killing	AMC
2011 **(38th)**	Leverage	TNT
2011 **(38th)**	True Blood	HBO
2012 **(39th)**	**The Walking Dead**	**AMC**
2012 **(39th)**	American Horror Story: Asylum	FX
2012 **(39th)**	Dexter	Showtime
2012 **(39th)**	The Killing	AMC
2012 **(39th)**	Leverage	TNT
2012 **(39th)**	True Blood	HBO
2013 **(40th)**	**The Walking Dead**	**AMC**
2013 **(40th)**	American Horror Story: Coven	FX
2013 **(40th)**	The Americans	FX
2013 **(40th)**	Continuum	Syfy
2013 **(40th)**	Dexter	Showtime
2013 **(40th)**	Haven	Syfy
2014 **(41st)**	**The Walking Dead**	**AMC**
2014 **(41st)**	American Horror Story: Freak Show	FX
2014 **(41st)**	Continuum	Syfy
2014 **(41st)**	Falling Skies	TNT
2014 **(41st)**	Salem	WGN America
2014 **(41st)**	The Strain	FX
2014 **(41st)**	12 Monkeys	Syfy

== Most nominations ==
- 11 nominations - Stargate SG-1 (consecutive)
- 8 nominations - Dexter (consecutive)
- 7 nominations - The Closer (consecutive)
- 5 nominations:
  - Battlestar Galactica (consecutive)
  - Farscape (consecutive)
  - Leverage (consecutive)
  - The Outer Limits (consecutive)
  - True Blood (consecutive)
- 4 nominations:
  - American Horror Story (consecutive)
  - Andromeda (consecutive)
  - Star Trek: Deep Space Nine (consecutive)
- 3 nominations:
  - Babylon 5 (consecutive)
  - Breaking Bad (consecutive)
  - Dead Like Me (consecutive)
  - The Dead Zone (consecutive)
  - The Walking Dead (consecutive)
- 2 nominations:
  - Continuum (consecutive)
  - Eureka
  - The 4400 (consecutive)
  - The Invisible Man (consecutive)
  - The Killing (consecutive)
  - Kyle XY (consecutive)
  - Nip/Tuck (consecutive)
  - Stargate: Atlantis (consecutive)

== Most wins ==
- 3 wins:
  - Battlestar Galactica (2 consecutive)
  - Breaking Bad (consecutive)
  - Farscape (consecutive)
  - Stargate SG-1 (2 consecutive)
  - The Walking Dead (consecutive)
- 2 wins - The Outer Limits (consecutive)

== See also ==
- Saturn Award for Best Action-Thriller Television Series
- Saturn Award for Best Animated Series or Film on Television
- Saturn Award for Best Fantasy Television Series
- Saturn Award for Best Horror Television Series
- Saturn Award for Best Network Television Series
- Saturn Award for Best Science Fiction Television Series
