= Michael Key =

American make-up artist

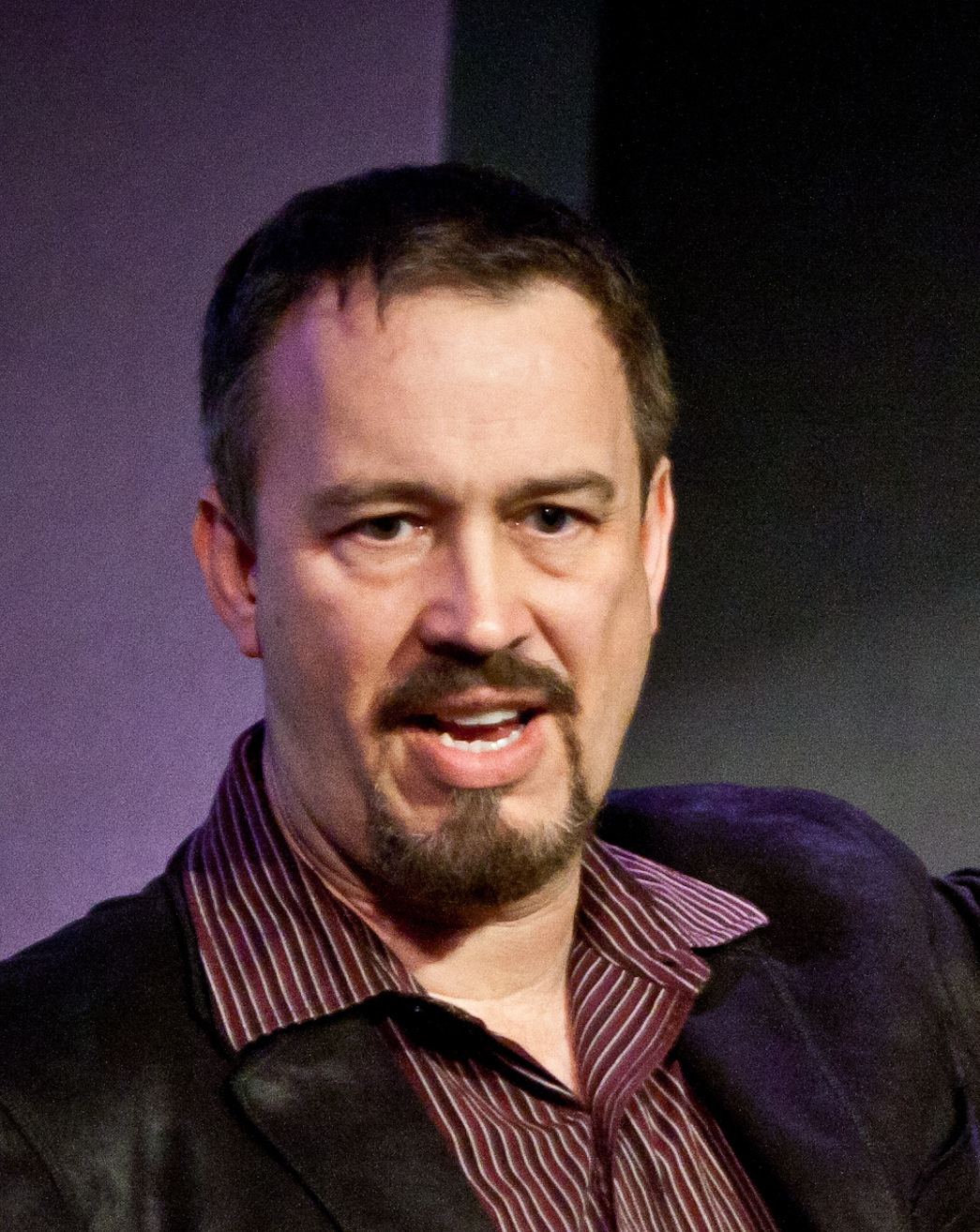
- Born: 1962 (age 63–64)
- Occupations: Makeup artist, magazine publisher, two-time Emmy Award winner
- Years active: 1987 to present
- Website: www.imats.net

Michael Key is an American make-up artist. He was nominated for five and won two Emmy Awards for his makeup artistry on Star Trek: Deep Space Nine in 1993 and 1995.

== Career ==
Key worked on the film Planet of the Apes in 2001, as well as the films Indiana Jones and the Crystal Skull and How the Grinch Stole Christmas. He is the Publisher of Make-Up Artist Magazine. Key launched the make-up industry's first international trade show called IMATS.

== Selected filmography ==
- Indiana Jones and the Kingdom of the Crystal Skull (2008)
- The Santa Clause 3: The Escape Clause (2006)
- Planet of the Apes (2001)
- How the Grinch Stole Christmas (2000)
- The 13th Warrior (1999)
- The Other Sister (1999)
- Charmed (TV series) (1998)
- Batman & Robin (1997)
- Jingle All the Way (1996)
- Down Periscope (1996)
- Star Trek: Voyager (1995)
- Star Trek Generations (1994)
- Star Trek: Deep Space Nine (1993)
