= List of accolades received by Star Trek Into Darkness =

Accolades received by Star Trek Into Darkness
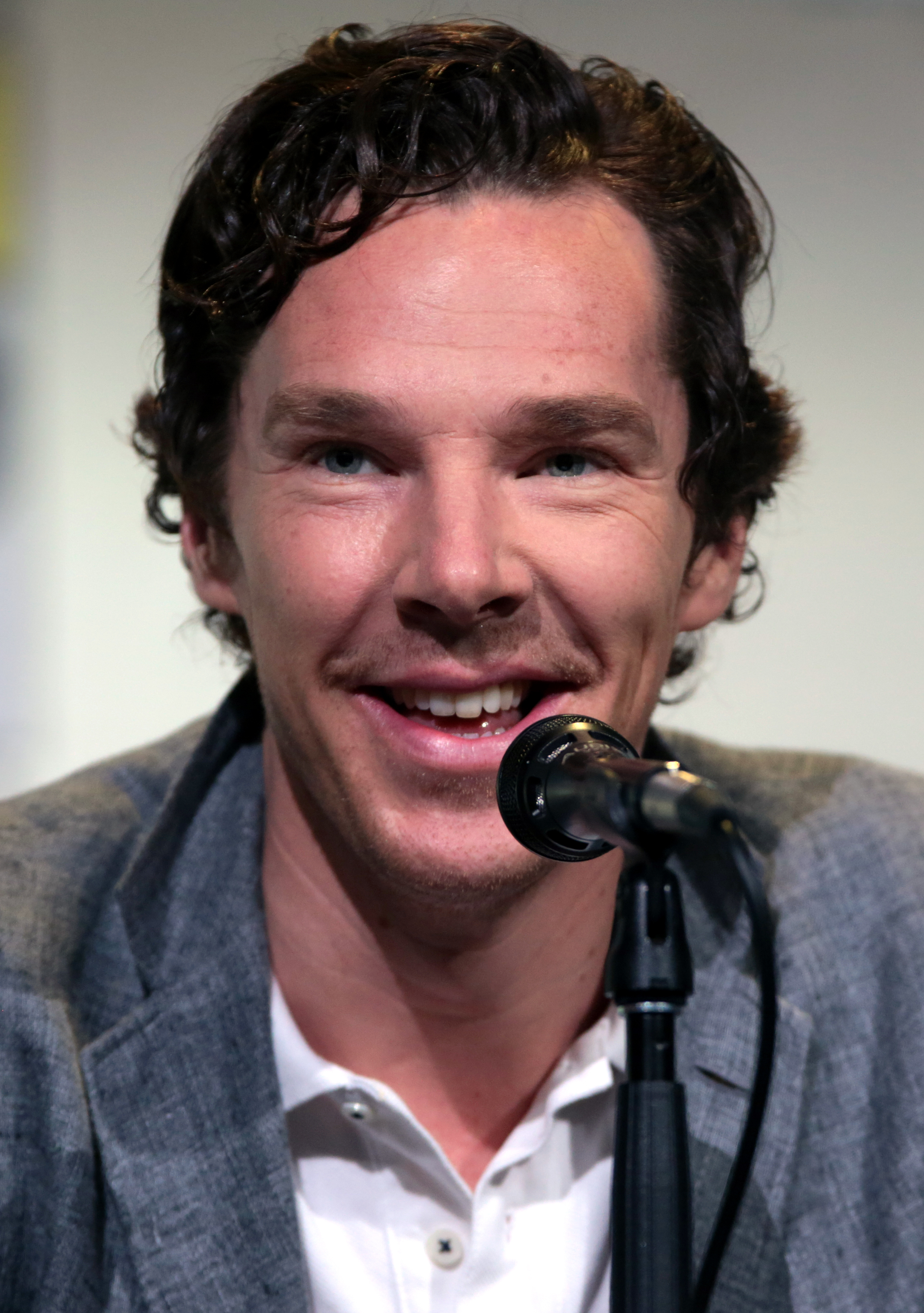
- Benedict Cumberbatch gained many awards for his performance in this film
Accolades
| Award | Won | Nominated |
| Academy Awards | 0 | 1 |
| ADG Excellence in Production Design Award | 0 | 1 |
| Annie Awards | 0 | 2 |
| ASCAP Film and Television Music Awards | 1 | 1 |
| Britannia Awards | 1 | 1 |
| British Academy Children's Awards | 0 | 1 |
| British Academy Film Awards | 0 | 1 |
| California on Location Awards | 1 | 1 |
| Critics' Choice Movie Award | 0 | 3 |
| Empire Awards | 0 | 1 |
| Golden Trailer Awards | 1 | 4 |
| Hollywood Film Festival Awards | 1 | 1 |
| Hollywood Post Alliance Awards | 0 | 3 |
| IGN Awards | 1 | 2 |
| IFMCA Awards | 0 | 1 |
| Key Art Awards | 2 | 2 |
| MTV Movie Awards | 0 | 1 |
| People's Choice Awards | 0 | 3 |
| Satellite Awards | 1 | 1 |
| Saturn Awards | 0 | 5 |
| St. Louis Gateway Film Critics Association Awards | 0 | 1 |
| Teen Choice Awards | 0 | 2 |
| Visual Effects Society Awards | 0 | 2 |
- Total number of awards and nominations (Note: Certain award groups do not simply award one winner. They recognize several different recipients and have runners-up. Since this is a specific recognition and is different from losing an award, runner-up mentions, such as Bronze or Silver awards, are considered wins in this award tally.)
| Totals | 9 | 41 |
- References

Star Trek Into Darkness is a 2013 American science fiction film produced by Bad Robot and Skydance Productions, and distributed by Paramount Pictures. It was written by Roberto Orci, Alex Kurtzman and Damon Lindelof, and was produced by J. J. Abrams and Bryan Burk in addition to the three writers. Abrams also directed the film. It is the twelfth film in the Star Trek film franchise, and a sequel to Star Trek (2009) which rebooted the series with a new cast. The film follows Captain James T. Kirk (Chris Pine) and the crew of the USS Enterprise as they seek to prevent Admiral Alexander Marcus (Peter Weller) from starting a war with the Klingon Empire, and Khan Noonien Singh (Benedict Cumberbatch) from getting his revenge on Starfleet. Star Trek Into Darkness was made on a production budget of $190 million.

The world premiere took place in Sydney, Australia on April 23, 2013. The film opened in the United States on May 16, 2013, grossing more than $70 million on the opening weekend and over $228 million during the theatrical run. Star Trek Into Darkness took more than $467 million worldwide. These takings placed the film as the second most successful Star Trek within the United States, and the most successful worldwide. Rotten Tomatoes, a review aggregator, surveyed 246 reviews and judged 87 percent to be positive.

Star Trek Into Darkness garnered 9 wins at ceremonies such as the ASCAP Film and Television Music Awards, Golden Trailer Awards and the California on Location Awards. This was out of 44 nominations, with the visual effects work on the film highlighted by the number of award nominations in this category. In addition, cast members such as Cumberbatch, Quinto and Pine were nominated for several awards, with Cumberbatch receiving the Britannia Award for British Artist of the Year. This was for the various films he appeared in during 2013, including 12 Years a Slave, August: Osage County and The Fifth Estate as well as Star Trek Into Darkness. The most nominations received were five, from the Saturn Awards, while the most wins came from the Key Art Awards were the film was awarded both a Bronze and Silver award.

== Awards and nominations ==
| Award | Date of ceremony | Category | Recipients | Result | Ref. |
|---|---|---|---|---|---|
| Academy Awards | March 2, 2014 | Best Visual Effects | Burt Dalton, Ben Grossmann, Roger Guyett, Patrick Tubach | Nominated | |
| ADG Excellence in Production Design Award | February 8, 2014 | Best Production Design – Fantasy Film | Scott Chambliss | Nominated | |
| Annie Awards | February 1, 2014 | Outstanding Achievement, Animated Effects in a Live Action Production | Karin Cooper, Ben O’Brien, Chris Root, Lee Uren | Nominated | |
| Annie Awards | February 1, 2014 | Outstanding Achievement, Animated Effects in a Live Action Production | Amelia Chenoweth, Jay Cooper, Jeff Grebe, Dan Pearson | Nominated | |
| ASCAP Film and Television Music Awards | June 26, 2014 | Top Box Office Film | Michael Giacchino | Won | |
| Britannia Awards | November 9, 2013 | British Artist of the Year | Benedict Cumberbatch | Won | |
| British Academy Children's Awards | November 24, 2013 | Kid's Vote – Feature Film | Star Trek Into Darkness | Nominated | |
| British Academy Film Awards | February 16, 2014 | Best Special Visual Effects | Burt Dalton, Ben Grossmann, Roger Guyett, Patrick Tubach | Nominated | |
| California on Location Awards | October 28, 2012 | Location Team of the Year – Features | Star Trek Into Darkness | Won | |
| Critics' Choice Awards | January 16, 2014 | Best Visual Effects | Star Trek Into Darkness | Nominated | |
| Critics' Choice Awards | January 16, 2014 | Best Action Film | Star Trek Into Darkness | Nominated | |
| Critics' Choice Awards | January 16, 2014 | Best Sci-Fi/Horror Film | Star Trek Into Darkness | Nominated | |
| Empire Awards | March 30, 2014 | Best Sci-Fi/Fantasy | Star Trek Into Darkness | Nominated | |
| Golden Trailer Awards | May 5, 2013 | Best Summer Blockbuster TV Spot | Paramount Pictures, AV Squad for "Return (Superbowl) (sic)" | Nominated | |
| Golden Trailer Awards | May 30, 2014 | Best Action | Paramount Pictures, TRANSIT for "Illusion" | Nominated | |
| Golden Trailer Awards | May 30, 2014 | Best Fantasy Adventure | Paramount Pictures, AV Squad for "Destiny Trailer 3" | Nominated | |
| Golden Trailer Awards | May 30, 2014 | Best Fantasy/Adventure TV Spot | Paramount Pictures, AV Squad for "Go :30" | Won | |
| Hollywood Film Festival Awards | October 20, 2013 | Best Hollywood Film | Star Trek Into Darkness | Won | |
| Hollywood Post Alliance Awards | November 7, 2013 | Outstanding Color Grading – Feature Film | Stefan Sonnenfeld | Nominated | |
| Hollywood Post Alliance Awards | November 7, 2013 | Outstanding Editing – Feature Film | Maryann Brandon, Mary Jo Markey | Nominated | |
| Hollywood Post Alliance Awards | November 7, 2013 | Outstanding Visual Effects – Feature Film | Jay Cooper, Dan Pearson, Alex Prichard, Adrien Saint Girons | Nominated | |
| IGN Awards | January 9, 2014 | Best Sci-Fi Movie | Star Trek Into Darkness | Nominated | |
| IGN Awards | January 9, 2014 | Best Sci-Fi Movie – People's Choice Award | Star Trek Into Darkness | Won | |
| IFMCA Awards | February 20, 2014 | Best Original Score For a Science Fiction/Fantasy Film | Michael Giacchino | Nominated | |
| Key Art Awards | October 14, 2013 | Best Trailer – Audio/Visual | AV Squad for "Destiny Trailer 3" | Bronze | |
| Key Art Awards | October 16, 2013 | Best Audio/Visual Technique | Pusher for "Trailer 2" | Silver | |
| MTV Movie Awards | April 13, 2014 | Best Villain | Benedict Cumberbatch | Nominated | |
| People's Choice Awards | January 8, 2014 | Favourite Movie | Star Trek Into Darkness | Nominated | |
| People's Choice Awards | January 8, 2014 | Favorite Movie Duo | Chris Pine, Zachary Quinto | Nominated | |
| People's Choice Awards | January 8, 2014 | Favorite Action Movie | Star Trek Into Darkness | Nominated | |
| Satellite Awards | December 2, 2013 | Best Overall Blu-ray Disc | Star Trek Into Darkness | Won | |
| Saturn Awards | February 25, 2014 | Best Science Fiction Film | Star Trek Into Darkness | Nominated | |
| Saturn Awards | February 25, 2014 | Best Director | J. J. Abrams | Nominated | |
| Saturn Awards | February 25, 2014 | Best Supporting Actor | Benedict Cumberbatch | Nominated | |
| Saturn Awards | February 25, 2014 | Best Costume | Michael Kaplan | Nominated | |
| Saturn Awards | February 25, 2014 | Best Special Effects | Burt Dalton, Ben Grossmann, Patrick Tubach | Nominated | |
| St. Louis Gateway Film Critics Association Awards | December 16, 2013 | Best Visual Effects | Star Trek Into Darkness | Nominated | |
| Teen Choice Awards | August 11, 2013 | Summer Movie Star: Male | Chris Pine | Nominated | |
| Teen Choice Awards | August 11, 2013 | Summer Movie Star: Female | Zoe Saldaña | Nominated | |
| Visual Effects Society Awards | February 12, 2014 | Outstanding Visual Effects in a Visual Effects Driven Feature Motion Picture | Ron Ames, Ben Grossmann, Roger Guyett, Luke O’Byrne | Nominated | |
| Visual Effects Society Awards | February 12, 2014 | Outstanding Models in a Feature Motion Picture | Thomas Fejes, John Goodson, Bruce Holcomb, Ron Woodall | Nominated | |

== See also ==
- 2014 in film
