= List of awards and nominations received by Star Trek: The Original Series =

Awards and nominations received by Star Trek: The Original Series
Awards and nominations
Award	Wins	Nominations
Emmy Award	0	13
Hugo Award	2	8
Peabody Award	1	1
Saturn Award	1	1
Television Critics Association Awards	0	1
TV Land Awards	1	4
Writers Guild of America	1	3

Totals (Note: Certain award groups do not simply award one winner. They acknowledge several different recipients, have runners-up, and have third place. Since this is a specific recognition and is different from losing an award, runner-up mentions are considered wins in this award tally. For simplification and to avoid errors, each award in this list has been presumed to have had a prior nomination.)
- Wins: 5
- Nominations: 31

The following is a list of the awards and nominations received by the American science fiction television series Star Trek: The Original Series (1966–69).

== Emmy Award ==
Year	Category	Nominee	Episode	Result
1967	Individual Achievements in Art Direction and Allied Crafts - Mechanical Special Effects	James Rugg	-	Nominated
1967	Individual Achievements in Cinematography - Photographic Special Effects	Linwood G. Dunn, Joseph Westheimer, Darrell A. Anderson	-	Nominated
1967	Individual Achievements in Film and Sound Editing	Doug Grindstaff	-	Nominated
1967	Outstanding Dramatic Series	Gene Roddenberry, Gene L. Coon	-	Nominated
1967	Outstanding Performance by an Actor in a Supporting Role in a Drama	Leonard Nimoy	-	Nominated
1968	Outstanding Achievement in Film Editing	Donald R. Rode	"The Doomsday Machine"	Nominated
1968	Outstanding Dramatic Series	Gene Roddenberry	-	Nominated
1968	Outstanding Performance by an Actor in a Supporting Role in a Drama	Leonard Nimoy	-	Nominated
1968	Special Classification of Individual Achievements	Westheimer Company	"Metamorphosis"	Nominated
1969	Outstanding Achievement in Art Direction and Scenic Design	John M. Dwyer, Walter M. Jefferies	"All Our Yesterdays"	Nominated
1969	Outstanding Achievement in Film Editing	Donald R. Rode	"Assignment: Earth"	Nominated
1969	Outstanding Continued Performance by an Actor in a Supporting Role in a Series	Leonard Nimoy	-	Nominated
1969	Special Classification of Outstanding Individual Achievements - Special Photographic Effects	Howard A. Anderson Company, Westheimer Company, Van der Veer Photo Effects, Cinema Research	"The Tholian Web"	Nominated

== Hugo Awards ==
Year	Category	Episode	Result
1967	Best Dramatic Presentation	"The Menagerie"	Won
1967	Best Dramatic Presentation	"The Corbomite Maneuver"	Nominated
1967	Best Dramatic Presentation	"The Naked Time"	Nominated
1968	Best Dramatic Presentation	"The City on the Edge of Forever"	Won
1968	Best Dramatic Presentation	"Amok Time"	Nominated
1968	Best Dramatic Presentation	"The Doomsday Machine"	Nominated
1968	Best Dramatic Presentation	"Mirror, Mirror"	Nominated
1968	Best Dramatic Presentation	"The Trouble with Tribbles"	Nominated

== Peabody Awards ==
Year	Category	Nominee	Result
2023	Peabody Institutional Award	The Star Trek franchise, all series	Won

== Saturn Awards ==
Year	Category	Nominee	Result
2005	Best DVD Retro Television Release	Star Trek: The Original Series	Won

== TV Land Awards ==
Year	Category	Nominee	Episode	Result
2003	Pop Culture Award	Star Trek: The Original Series	-	Won
2006	Most Memorable Kiss	William Shatner, Nichelle Nichols	-	Nominated
2007	TV Moment That Became Headline News	William Shatner, Nichelle Nichols	-	Nominated
2008	Greatest Gadgets	Star Trek: The Original Series	-	Nominated

== Television Critics Association Awards ==
Year	Category	Nominee	Result
2009	Heritage Award	Star Trek: The Original Series	Nominated

== Writers Guild of America ==
Year	Category	Nominee	Episode	Result
1968	Episodic Drama	Harlan Ellison	"The City on the Edge of Forever"	Won
1968	Episodic Drama	Boris Sobelman (teleplay), Gene Roddenberry (story)	"The Return of the Archons"	Nominated
1969	Episodic Drama	John T. Dugan	"Return to Tomorrow"	Nominated

== See also ==
- List of Star Trek: The Next Generation awards and nominations
- List of Star Trek: Deep Space Nine awards and nominations
- List of Star Trek: Voyager awards and nominations
- List of Star Trek: Enterprise awards and nominations
- List of Star Trek: Discovery awards and nominations
