= 29th Saturn Awards =

US film and television award ceremony

- Date: May 18, 2003
- Site: Los Angeles, California, U.S.

Highlights
- Most awards: The Lord of the Rings: The Two Towers (4); Minority Report (4)
- Most nominations: Minority Report (11)

The 29th Saturn Awards, honoring the best in science fiction, fantasy and horror film and television in 2002, were held on May 18, 2003, at the Renaissance Hollywood Hotel in Los Angeles, California. This ceremony revived the Best Animated Film category, which had been last given out at the 10th Saturn Awards in 1983. The nominees were announced on March 6, 2003.

Below is a complete list of nominees and winners. Winners are highlighted in bold.

== Winners and nominees ==
=== Film ===
Best Actor	Best Actress
**Robin Williams – One Hour Photo as Seymour "Sy" Parrish**; Pierce Brosnan – Die Another Day as James Bond; George Clooney – Solaris as Dr. Chris Kelvin; Tom Cruise – Minority Report as Chief John Anderton; Tobey Maguire – Spider-Man as Peter Parker / Spider-Man; Viggo Mortensen – The Lord of the Rings: The Two Towers as Aragorn	**Naomi Watts – The Ring as Rachel Keller**; Kirsten Dunst – Spider-Man as Mary Jane Watson; Jodie Foster – Panic Room as Meg Altman; Milla Jovovich – Resident Evil as Alice; Natascha McElhone – Solaris as Rheya; Natalie Portman – Star Wars: Episode II – Attack of the Clones as Padmé Amidala
Best Supporting Actor	Best Supporting Actress
**Andy Serkis – The Lord of the Rings: The Two Towers as Gollum**; Ralph Fiennes – Red Dragon as Francis Dolarhyde; Tom Hardy – Star Trek: Nemesis as Praetor Shinzon; Toby Stephens – Die Another Day as Gustav Graves; Max von Sydow – Minority Report as Lamar Burgess; Robin Williams – Insomnia as Walter Finch	**Samantha Morton – Minority Report as Agatha Lively**; Halle Berry – Die Another Day as Jinx Johnson; Connie Nielsen – One Hour Photo as Nina Yorkin; Rachel Roberts – S1M0̸NE as Simone; Sissy Spacek – Tuck Everlasting as Mae Tuck; Emily Watson – Red Dragon as Reba McClane
Best Performance by a Younger Actor	Best Director
**Tyler Hoechlin – Road to Perdition as Michael Sullivan Jr.**; Alexis Bledel – Tuck Everlasting as Winnie Foster; Hayden Christensen – Star Wars: Episode II – Attack of the Clones as Anakin Skywalker; Daniel Radcliffe – Harry Potter and the Chamber of Secrets as Harry Potter; Jeremy Sumpter – Frailty as Young Adam; Elijah Wood – The Lord of the Rings: The Two Towers as Frodo Baggins	**Steven Spielberg – Minority Report**; Chris Columbus – Harry Potter and the Chamber of Secrets; Peter Jackson – The Lord of the Rings: The Two Towers; George Lucas – Star Wars: Episode II – Attack of the Clones; Bill Paxton – Frailty; Sam Raimi – Spider-Man
Best Writing	Best Costumes
**Scott Frank and Jon Cohen – Minority Report**; Brent Hanley – Frailty; Hayao Miyazaki, Cindy Davis Hewitt, and Donald H. Hewitt – Spirited Away; Mark Romanek – One Hour Photo; Hillary Seitz – Insomnia; Fran Walsh, Philippa Boyens, Stephen Sinclair, and Peter Jackson – The Lord of the Rings: The Two Towers	**Trisha Biggar – Star Wars: Episode II – Attack of the Clones (TIE)**; **Ngila Dickson and Richard Taylor – The Lord of the Rings: The Two Towers (TIE)**; Deena Appel – Austin Powers in Goldmember; Lindy Hemming – Harry Potter and the Chamber of Secrets; Bob Ringwood – Star Trek: Nemesis; Deborah Lynn Scott – Minority Report
Best Make-up	Best Music
**Peter Owen and Peter King – The Lord of the Rings: The Two Towers**; Rick Baker, Jean Ann Black, and Bill Sturgeon – The Ring; Michèle Burke and Camille Calvet – Minority Report; Nick Dudman and Amanda Knight – Harry Potter and the Chamber of Secrets; Michelle Taylor, Gary Matanky, Bob Newton, and Mark Boley – Blade II; Michael Westmore – Star Trek: Nemesis	**Danny Elfman – Spider-Man**; Reinhold Heil – One Hour Photo; Joe Hisaishi – Spirited Away; Howard Shore – The Lord of the Rings: The Two Towers; John Williams – Minority Report; John Williams – Star Wars: Episode II – Attack of the Clones
Best Science Fiction Film	Best Fantasy Film
**Minority Report**; Men in Black II; Signs; Solaris; Star Trek: Nemesis; Star Wars: Episode II – Attack of the Clones	**The Lord of the Rings: The Two Towers**; Harry Potter and the Chamber of Secrets; Reign of Fire; The Santa Clause 2; The Scorpion King; Spider-Man
Best Horror Film	Best Action/Adventure/Thriller Film
**The Ring**; Blade II; Eight Legged Freaks; Frailty; Queen of the Damned; Resident Evil	**Road to Perdition**; The Bourne Identity; Die Another Day; One Hour Photo; Red Dragon; XXX
Best Animated Film	Best Special Effects
**Spirited Away**; Ice Age; Lilo & Stitch; Treasure Planet	**Rob Coleman, Pablo Helman, John Knoll, and Ben Snow – Star Wars: Episode II – Attack of the Clones**; John Dykstra, Scott Stokdyk, Anthony LaMolinara, and John Frazier – Spider-Man; Scott Farrar, Henry LaBounta, Michael Lantieri, and Nathan McGuinness – Minority Report; John Frazier, Joel Hynek, Matthew E. Butler, and Sean Andrew Faden – XXX; Jim Mitchell, Nick Davis, John Richardson, and Bill George – Harry Potter and the Chamber of Secrets; Jim Rygiel, Joe Letteri, Randall William Cook, and Alex Funke – The Lord of the Rings: The Two Towers

=== Television ===
==== Programs ====
Best Network Television Series	Best Syndicated/Cable Television Series
**Alias (ABC)**; Angel (The WB); Buffy the Vampire Slayer (UPN); Enterprise (UPN); Smallville (The WB); The Twilight Zone (UPN)	**Farscape (Sci Fi)**; Andromeda (Syndicated); The Dead Zone (USA Network); Jeremiah (Showtime); Mutant X (Syndicated); Stargate SG-1 (Sci Fi)
Best Single Television Presentation
**Taken (Sci Fi)**; Carrie (NBC); Dinotopia (ABC); Lathe of Heaven (A&E); Rose Red (ABC); Snow Queen (Hallmark Channel)

==== Acting ====
Best Television Actor	Best Television Actress
**David Boreanaz – Angel (The WB) as Angel**; Richard Dean Anderson – Stargate SG-1 (Sci Fi) as Jack O'Neill; Scott Bakula – Enterprise (UPN) as Jonathan Archer; Ben Browder – Farscape (Sci Fi) as John Crichton; Anthony Michael Hall – The Dead Zone (USA Network) as Johnny Smith; Tom Welling – Smallville (The WB) as Clark Kent	**Jennifer Garner – Alias (ABC) as Sydney Bristow**; Emily Bergl – Taken (Sci Fi) as Lisa Clarke – Adult; Claudia Black – Farscape (Sci Fi) as Aeryn Sun; Charisma Carpenter – Angel (The WB) as Cordelia Chase; Sarah Michelle Gellar – Buffy the Vampire Slayer (UPN) as Buffy Summers; Kristin Kreuk – Smallville (The WB) as Lana Lang
Best Supporting Television Actor	Best Supporting Television Actress
**Victor Garber – Alias (ABC) as Jack Bristow**; Alexis Denisof – Angel (The WB) as Wesley Wyndam-Pryce; John Glover – Smallville (The WB) as Lionel Luthor; James Marsters – Buffy the Vampire Slayer (UPN) as Spike; Michael Rosenbaum – Smallville (The WB) as Lex Luthor; Connor Trinneer – Enterprise (UPN) as Trip Tucker	**Alyson Hannigan – Buffy the Vampire Slayer (UPN) as Willow Rosenberg**; Amy Acker – Angel (The WB) as Winifred Burkle; Jolene Blalock – Enterprise (UPN) as T'Pol; Heather Donahue – Taken (Sci Fi) as Adult Mary Crawford; Dakota Fanning – Taken (Sci Fi) as Allie Keys; Michelle Trachtenberg – Buffy the Vampire Slayer (UPN) as Dawn Summers

=== DVD ===
Best DVD Release	Best DVD Classic Film Release
**Dog Soldiers**; Brother's Keeper; Dagon; The Hunchback of Notre Dame II; Metropolis; Vampires: Los Muertos	**E.T. the Extra-Terrestrial (Ultimate Gift Set)**; Back to the Future: The Complete Trilogy; Beauty and the Beast (Platinum Edition); The Great Race; Near Dark; Star Trek II: The Wrath of Khan (The Director's Edition)
Best DVD Special Edition Release	Best DVD Television Programming
**The Lord of the Rings: The Fellowship of the Ring (Special Extended DVD Edition)**; A.I. Artificial Intelligence; Memento; Minority Report; Monsters, Inc.; Star Wars: Episode II – Attack of the Clones	**Star Trek: The Next Generation: Seasons 1–7**; Babylon 5: Season 1; Buffy the Vampire Slayer: Seasons 1 & 2; Highlander: The Series: Season 1; The Outer Limits: Season 1; The X-Files: Seasons 5 & 6

== Special awards ==
=== Cinescape Genre Face of the Future Award ===
Female	Male
**Emma Caulfield – Buffy the Vampire Slayer and Darkness Falls**; Monica Bellucci – The Matrix Reloaded and The Matrix Revolutions; Kristanna Loken – Terminator 3: Rise of the Machines; Rosamund Pike – Die Another Day; Sarah Wynter – 24 and The 6th Day	**Nathan Fillion – Firefly**; Shawn Ashmore – X2; Eric Balfour – The Texas Chainsaw Massacre and Veritas: The Quest; Eric Bana – Hulk; Shane West – The League of Extraordinary Gentlemen

=== The Filmmaker's Showcase Award ===
- Bill Paxton

=== The Special Achievement Award ===
- Bob Weinstein and Harvey Weinstein

=== The Dr. Donald A. Reed Award ===
- James Cameron

=== The Life Career Award ===
- Sid and Marty Krofft and Kurt Russell
