= Saturn Award for Best Television DVD Release =

Annual US media award

The Saturn Award for Best Television Release is an award presented to the best home media release of a television series by the Academy of Science Fiction, Fantasy and Horror Films.The following is a list of the winners of this award:

== Winners and nominees ==
| Year | DVD |
|---|---|
| 2002 (29th) | Star Trek: The Next Generation (Seasons 1–7) |
| 2002 (29th) | Babylon 5: The Complete First Season |
| 2002 (29th) | Buffy the Vampire Slayer (Seasons 1–2) |
| 2002 (29th) | Highlander: The Series - Season 1 |
| 2002 (29th) | The Outer Limits: The Original Series – Season 1 |
| 2002 (29th) | The X-Files (Seasons 5–6) |
| 2003 (30th) | Firefly: The Complete Series |
| 2003 (30th) | Battlestar Galactica: The Complete Epic Series |
| 2003 (30th) | Hercules: The Legendary Journeys (Seasons 1–2) |
| 2003 (30th) | Star Trek: Deep Space Nine (Seasons 1–7) |
| 2003 (30th) | Taken |
| 2003 (30th) | Wiseguy (Season 1, Part 1 & 2) |
| 2004 (31st) | Smallville (Seasons 2–3) |
| 2004 (31st) | Buffy the Vampire Slayer (Seasons 6–7) |
| 2004 (31st) | Farscape: The Complete Fourth Season |
| 2004 (31st) | The Simpsons (Seasons 4–5) |
| 2004 (31st) | Star Trek: Voyager (Seasons 1–7) |
| 2004 (31st) | A Wrinkle in Time |
| 2005 (32nd) | Lost: The Complete First Season |
| 2005 (32nd) | Battlestar Galactica (Seasons 1–2.0) |
| 2005 (32nd) | Frankenstein |
| 2005 (32nd) | House: Season 1 |
| 2005 (32nd) | Smallville: The Complete Fourth Season |
| 2005 (32nd) | Star Trek: Enterprise – The Complete Collection |
| 2006 (33rd) | Masters of Horror: Season 1 |
| 2006 (33rd) | Deadwood: The Complete Second Season |
| 2006 (33rd) | Doctor Who: The Complete Second Series |
| 2006 (33rd) | Lost: The Complete Second Season |
| 2006 (33rd) | MI-5: Volume 4 |
| 2006 (33rd) | The Mystery Science Theater 3000 Collection (Vol. 9–10) |
| 2007 (34th) | Heroes: Season 1 |
| 2007 (34th) | Eureka: Season 1 |
| 2007 (34th) | Hustle (Series 2–3) |
| 2007 (34th) | Lost: The Complete Third Season |
| 2007 (34th) | Spooks (Series 4–5) |
| 2007 (34th) | Planet Earth: The Complete Series |
| 2008 (35th) | Moonlight: The Complete Series |
| 2008 (35th) | Doctor Who: The Complete Fourth Series |
| 2008 (35th) | Heroes: Season 2 |
| 2008 (35th) | Lost: The Complete Fourth Season |
| 2008 (35th) | Reaper: Season 1 |
| 2008 (35th) | Torchwood: The Complete Second Series |
| 2008 (35th) | The Tudors: The Complete Second Season |
| 2009 (36th) | Lost: The Complete Fifth Season |
| 2009 (36th) | Life on Mars: The Complete Series |
| 2009 (36th) | Doctor Who: Planet of the Dead |
| 2009 (36th) | Primeval: Volume 2 |
| 2009 (36th) | Terminator: The Sarah Connor Chronicles – The Complete Second Season |
| 2009 (36th) | Torchwood: Children of Earth |
| 2010 (37th) | The Twilight Zone (Seasons 1–2) [Blu-ray] |
| 2010 (37th) | Lost: The Complete Sixth Season |
| 2010 (37th) | The Six Million Dollar Man: The Complete Collection |
| 2010 (37th) | Space: 1999 - Season 1 (Blu-ray) |
| 2010 (37th) | Thriller: The Complete Series |
| 2010 (37th) | Voyage to the Bottom of the Sea: Season 4, Volume 2 |
| 2011 (38th) | Spartacus: Gods of the Arena |
| 2011 (38th) | The Bionic Woman (Seasons 2–3) |
| 2011 (38th) | Camelot: The Complete First Season |
| 2011 (38th) | Farscape: The Complete Series |
| 2011 (38th) | Nikita: The Complete First Season |
| 2011 (38th) | The Twilight Zone (Seasons 3–5) [Blu-ray] |
| 2012 (39th) | Star Trek: The Next Generation (Seasons 1–2) [Blu-ray] |
| 2012 (39th) | In Search of...: The Complete Collection |
| 2012 (39th) | Logan's Run: The Complete Series |
| 2012 (39th) | The River: The Complete First Season |
| 2012 (39th) | Shazam!: The Complete Live Action Series |
| 2012 (39th) | Spartacus: Vengeance |
| 2013 (40th) | Star Trek: The Next Generation (Seasons 3–5) [Blu-ray] |
| 2013 (40th) | The Adventures of Superboy: The Complete Third Season |
| 2013 (40th) | Search: The Complete Series |
| 2013 (40th) | Under the Dome: Season 1 |
| 2013 (40th) | The Walking Dead: The Complete Third Season |
| 2013 (40th) | The White Queen |
| 2014 (41st) | Twin Peaks: The Entire Mystery |
| 2014 (41st) | Batman: The Complete Television Series |
| 2014 (41st) | Hannibal: Season 2 |
| 2014 (41st) | Merlin: The Complete Series |
| 2014 (41st) | Spartacus: The Complete Series |
| 2014 (41st) | Star Trek: The Next Generation: Season 7 (Blu-ray) |
| 2014 (41st) | Wizards and Warriors: The Complete Series |
| 2015 (42nd) | The X-Files: The Collector's Set |
| 2015 (42nd) | Black Sails: The Complete Second Season |
| 2015 (42nd) | From Dusk till Dawn: The Series - Season 2 |
| 2015 (42nd) | Hannibal: Season 3 |
| 2015 (42nd) | Lost in Space: The Complete Adventures |
| 2015 (42nd) | My Favorite Martian: The Complete Series |
| 2016 (43rd) | Hannibal: The Complete Series Collection |
| 2016 (43rd) | Banshee: The Complete Fourth Season |
| 2016 (43rd) | Mr. Robot: Season 1 |
| 2016 (43rd) | Salem's Lot |
| 2016 (43rd) | Star Trek: The Animated Series |
| 2016 (43rd) | Versailles: Season 1 |
| 2017 (44th) | American Gods: Season 1 |
| 2017 (44th) | Grimm: The Complete Collection |
| 2017 (44th) | The Rockford Files: The Complete Series |
| 2017 (44th) | Twin Peaks: A Limited Event Series |
| 2017 (44th) | The Vampire Diaries: The Complete Series |
| 2017 (44th) | Westworld: Season 1 – The Maze |
| 2018/2019 (45th) | The Outer Limits (Seasons 1–2) |
| 2018/2019 (45th) | The Ghost of Sierra de Cobre |
| 2018/2019 (45th) | The Martian Chronicles |
| 2018/2019 (45th) | The Night Stalker |
| 2018/2019 (45th) | The Night Strangler |
| 2018/2019 (45th) | Trilogy of Terror |
| 2019/2020 (46th) | Creepshow: Season 1 |
| 2019/2020 (46th) | Buck Rogers in the 25th Century: The Complete Collection |
| 2019/2020 (46th) | The Librarians: The Complete Series |
| 2019/2020 (46th) | Mission: Impossible – The Original TV Series |
| 2019/2020 (46th) | The Outsider |
| 2019/2020 (46th) | Shazam!: The Complete Live Action Series |
| 2019/2020 (46th) | The Simpsons: The Nineteenth Season |
| 2021/2022 (50th) | Chucky: Season 1 |
| 2021/2022 (50th) | The Adventures of Ozzie and Harriet (Seasons 1–2) |
| 2021/2022 (50th) | Creepshow: Season 2 |
| 2021/2022 (50th) | Kolchak: The Night Stalker – The Complete Series |
| 2021/2022 (50th) | Night Gallery: Season 1 |
| 2021/2022 (50th) | The Six Million Dollar Man: The Complete Series |
| 2022/2023 (51st) | Night Gallery: Season 3 |
| 2022/2023 (51st) | Interview with the Vampire: Season 1 |
| 2022/2023 (51st) | Better Call Saul: The Complete Series |
| 2022/2023 (51st) | Creepshow: Season 3 |
| 2022/2023 (51st) | Doctor Who: The Abominable Snowmen |
| 2022/2023 (51st) | Loki: The Complete First Season |
| 2022/2023 (51st) | Quantum Leap: Season 1 |
| 2023/2024 (52nd) | Andor: The Complete First Season |
| 2023/2024 (52nd) | The Adventures of Ozzie and Harriet: The Complete Series |
| 2023/2024 (52nd) | Columbo: The Return |
| 2023/2024 (52nd) | Farscape: The Complete Series (25th Anniversary Edition) |
| 2023/2024 (52nd) | Interview with the Vampire: Season 2 |
| 2023/2024 (52nd) | La Brea: The Complete Series |
| 2024/2025 (53rd) | Chucky: The Complete Series |
| 2024/2025 (53rd) | Creepshow: Complete Series |
| 2024/2025 (53rd) | Knight Rider: The Complete Series |
| 2024/2025 (53rd) | Peanuts: 75th Anniversary Ultimate TV Specials Collection |
| 2024/2025 (53rd) | The Huckleberry Hound Show: The Complete Original Series |
| 2024/2025 (53rd) | The Penguin: The Complete First Season |

== Shows with multiple nominations ==
- Lost – 6 (2 wins)
- Star Trek: The Next Generation – 4 (3 wins)
- Night Gallery – 2 (one win)
- Twin Peaks – 2 (one win)
