= Gary Hutzel =

American visual effects supervisor

- Born: Gary Dean Hutzel; November 4, 1955; Ann Arbor, Michigan, U.S.
- Died: March 1, 2016 (aged 60); Vancouver, British Columbia, Canada
- Education: University of Michigan
- Occupation: Visual effects supervisor
- Years active: 1985–2016
- Known for: Star Trek: The Next Generation; Star Trek: Deep Space Nine; Battlestar Galactica
- Children: 3
- Awards: 4x Emmy Award

Gary Dean Hutzel (November 4, 1955 – March 1, 2016) was an American visual effects supervisor from Ann Arbor, Michigan who worked on the television series Star Trek: The Next Generation, Star Trek: Deep Space Nine, and Battlestar Galactica, among others. He was nominated more than 20 times for Emmy Awards, winning on four occasions.

== Early life ==
Gary Hutzel was born in Ann Arbor, Michigan. He studied mechanical engineering at the University of Michigan for a period, but decided that he wanted to pursue a career in films and moved to California, where he studied photography at the Brooks Institute. His first job in the industry was as a van driver for the commercial production house FilmFair. While there, he decided that he wanted to pursue visual effects.

== Special effects career ==
His first visual effects job was as second assistant cameraman on the 1985 film Teen Wolf. He then began to freelance for CBS, working on The Twilight Zone. In 1986, he was recruited to work on the new Star Trek television series, Star Trek: The Next Generation as a visual effects coordinator. He continued to work on the show for the following five seasons, before moving to work on the spin-off series Star Trek: Deep Space Nine where he was the visual effects supervisor for all seven seasons.

During his work on the Star Trek franchise, he worked on a great number of visual effects shots including the breakapart model of the Borg Cube seen in the two-part episode "The Best of Both Worlds", the design of the USS Defiant and the blending of old and new footage required for "Trials and Tribble-ations". He also produced renderings for several non-canon Star Trek novels, although he was known as being reluctant to use computer generated imagery and preferred to work with physical models where possible. Hutzel co-wrote The Magic of Tribbles: The Making of Star Trek Deep Space Nine – "Trials and Tribbles-ations" alongside Terry J. Erdmann and Paula M. Block.

Following the end of Deep Space Nine, Hutzel worked on the film Red Planet and the Spy Kids franchise. He was hired by writer Ronald D. Moore to work on the rebooted Battlestar Galactica television series. Hutzel had worked with Moore on Deep Space Nine. In addition, Hutzel went on to work on the prequel to Battlestar Galactica, Caprica. He then worked as visual effects supervisor for the television series Defiance.

=== Awards ===
Hutzel was nominated for more than 20 nominations for Emmy Awards during the span of his career. He won four in total, two for his work on Battlestar Galactica and one each for The Next Generation and Deep Space Nine.

== Personal life and death ==
While working on the special effects for the Freeform television series Beyond on March 1, 2016, in Vancouver, British Columbia, Canada, he had a heart attack and died. Freeform released a statement saying "We are deeply saddened by the loss of our friend and colleague, Gary Hutzel. Our thoughts and prayers are with his family and our 'Beyond' family". He was survived by his wife, a daughter and two sons.
