= Saturn Award for Best Network Television Series =

Annual US television award

The Saturn Award for Best Network Television Series was presented annually by the Academy of Science Fiction, Fantasy and Horror Films, honoring the best network television series. It was introduced in 1988 and discontinued in 2015 when the Saturn Award went through major changes in their television categories.

Lost holds the record of the most wins in this category with five; additionally, Buffy the Vampire Slayer and The X-Files both won the award three times. The X-Files is also the most nominated series in the category, with eight nominations.

(NOTE: Year refers to year of eligibility, the actual ceremonies are held the following year)

The winners are listed in bold.

== Winners and nominees ==
=== 1980s ===
| Year | TV Series | Network |
Best Genre Television Series
| 1988 **(16th)** | **Star Trek: The Next Generation** | **Syndicated** |
| 1988 **(16th)** | Beauty and the Beast | CBS |
| 1988 **(16th)** | Freddy's Nightmares | Syndicated |
| 1988 **(16th)** | Friday the 13th: The Series | Syndicated |
| 1988 **(16th)** | Out of This World | Syndicated |
| 1988 **(16th)** | Superboy | Syndicated |
| 1988 **(16th)** | War of the Worlds | Syndicated |
| 1989/1990 **(17th)** | **Star Trek: The Next Generation** | **Syndicated** |

=== 1990s ===
| Year | Program | Network |
Best Network Television Program
| 1991 **(18th)** | **Dark Shadows** | **NBC** |
| 1991 **(18th)** | Cast a Deadly Spell | HBO |
| 1991 **(18th)** | Psycho IV: The Beginning | Showtime |
| 1991 **(18th)** | Quantum Leap | NBC |
| 1991 **(18th)** | Star Trek: The Next Generation | Syndicated |
| 1991 **(18th)** | Tales from the Crypt | HBO |
| 1992 **(19th)** | **The Simpsons** | **Fox** |
| 1992 **(19th)** | Batman: The Animated Series | Fox |
| 1992 **(19th)** | Intruders | CBS |
| 1992 **(19th)** | Quantum Leap | NBC |
| 1992 **(19th)** | The Ren & Stimpy Show | Nickelodeon |
| 1992 **(19th)** | Star Trek: The Next Generation | Syndicated |
| 1992 **(19th)** | Tales from the Crypt | HBO |
| 1993 **(20th)** | **Lois & Clark: The New Adventures of Superman** | **ABC** |
| 1993 **(20th)** | The Adventures of Brisco County, Jr. | Fox |
| 1993 **(20th)** | The Simpsons | Fox |
| 1993 **(20th)** | Star Trek: Deep Space Nine | Syndicated |
| 1993 **(20th)** | Star Trek: The Next Generation | Syndicated |
| 1993 **(20th)** | Wild Palms | ABC |
| 1993 **(20th)** | The X-Files | Fox |
| 1994 **(21st)** | **The X-Files** | **Fox** |
| 1994 **(21st)** | Earth 2 | NBC |
| 1994 **(21st)** | M.A.N.T.I.S. | Fox |
| 1994 **(21st)** | seaQuest DSV | NBC |
| 1994 **(21st)** | The Simpsons | Fox |
| 1994 **(21st)** | Star Trek: The Next Generation | Syndicated |
| 1994 **(21st)** | Tales from the Crypt | HBO |
| 1995 **(22nd)** | **The Outer Limits** | **Showtime** |
| 1995 **(22nd)** | American Gothic | CBS |
| 1995 **(22nd)** | The Simpsons | Fox |
| 1995 **(22nd)** | Sliders | Fox |
| 1995 **(22nd)** | Space: Above and Beyond | Fox |
| 1995 **(22nd)** | Star Trek: Deep Space Nine | Syndicated |
Best Network Television Series (Best Genre Network TV Series)
| 1996 **(23rd)** | **The X-Files** | **Fox** |
| 1996 **(23rd)** | Dark Skies | NBC |
| 1996 **(23rd)** | Early Edition | CBS |
| 1996 **(23rd)** | Millennium | Fox |
| 1996 **(23rd)** | The Simpsons | Fox |
| 1996 **(23rd)** | Sliders | Fox |
| 1997 **(24th)** | **Buffy the Vampire Slayer** | **The WB** |
| 1997 **(24th)** | Profiler | NBC |
| 1997 **(24th)** | The Simpsons | Fox |
| 1997 **(24th)** | Star Trek: Voyager | UPN |
| 1997 **(24th)** | The Visitor | Fox |
| 1997 **(24th)** | The X-Files | Fox |
| 1998 **(25th)** | **The X-Files** | **Fox** |
| 1998 **(25th)** | Buffy the Vampire Slayer | The WB |
| 1998 **(25th)** | Charmed | The WB |
| 1998 **(25th)** | Seven Days | UPN |
| 1998 **(25th)** | The Simpsons | Fox |
| 1998 **(25th)** | Star Trek: Voyager | UPN |
| 1999 **(26th)** | **Now and Again** | **CBS** |
| 1999 **(26th)** | Angel | The WB |
| 1999 **(26th)** | Buffy the Vampire Slayer | The WB |
| 1999 **(26th)** | Roswell | The WB |
| 1999 **(26th)** | Seven Days | UPN |
| 1999 **(26th)** | The X-Files | Fox |

=== 2000s ===
| Year | TV Series | Network |
|---|---|---|
| 2000 **(27th)** | **Buffy the Vampire Slayer** | **The WB** |
| 2000 **(27th)** | Angel | The WB |
| 2000 **(27th)** | Dark Angel | Fox |
| 2000 **(27th)** | Roswell | The WB |
| 2000 **(27th)** | Star Trek: Voyager | UPN |
| 2000 **(27th)** | The X-Files | Fox |
| 2001 **(28th)** | **Buffy the Vampire Slayer** | **The WB** |
| 2001 **(28th)** | Angel | The WB |
| 2001 **(28th)** | Dark Angel | Fox |
| 2001 **(28th)** | Enterprise | UPN |
| 2001 **(28th)** | Smallville | The WB |
| 2001 **(28th)** | The X-Files | Fox |
| 2002 **(29th)** | **Alias** | **ABC** |
| 2002 **(29th)** | Angel | The WB |
| 2002 **(29th)** | Buffy the Vampire Slayer | UPN |
| 2002 **(29th)** | Enterprise | UPN |
| 2002 **(29th)** | Smallville | The WB |
| 2002 **(29th)** | The Twilight Zone | UPN |
| 2003 **(30th)** | **Angel** | **The WB** |
| 2003 **(30th)** | **CSI: Crime Scene Investigation** | **CBS** |
| 2003 **(30th)** | Alias | ABC |
| 2003 **(30th)** | Buffy the Vampire Slayer | UPN |
| 2003 **(30th)** | Smallville | The WB |
| 2003 **(30th)** | Star Trek: Enterprise | UPN |
| 2004 **(31st)** | **Lost** | **ABC** |
| 2004 **(31st)** | Alias | ABC |
| 2004 **(31st)** | Angel | The WB |
| 2004 **(31st)** | CSI: Crime Scene Investigation | CBS |
| 2004 **(31st)** | Smallville | The WB |
| 2004 **(31st)** | Star Trek: Enterprise | UPN |
| 2005 **(32nd)** | **Lost** | **ABC** |
| 2005 **(32nd)** | Invasion | ABC |
| 2005 **(32nd)** | Prison Break | Fox |
| 2005 **(32nd)** | Smallville | The WB |
| 2005 **(32nd)** | Supernatural | The WB |
| 2005 **(32nd)** | Surface | NBC |
| 2005 **(32nd)** | Veronica Mars | UPN |
| 2006 **(33rd)** | **Heroes** | **NBC** |
| 2006 **(33rd)** | Jericho | CBS |
| 2006 **(33rd)** | Lost | ABC |
| 2006 **(33rd)** | Smallville | The CW |
| 2006 **(33rd)** | 24 | Fox |
| 2006 **(33rd)** | Veronica Mars | The CW |
| 2007 **(34th)** | **Lost** | **ABC** |
| 2007 **(34th)** | Heroes | NBC |
| 2007 **(34th)** | Journeyman | NBC |
| 2007 **(34th)** | Pushing Daisies | ABC |
| 2007 **(34th)** | Supernatural | The CW |
| 2007 **(34th)** | Terminator: The Sarah Connor Chronicles | Fox |
| 2008 **(35th)** | **Lost** | **ABC** |
| 2008 **(35th)** | Fringe | Fox |
| 2008 **(35th)** | Heroes | NBC |
| 2008 **(35th)** | Life on Mars | ABC |
| 2008 **(35th)** | Supernatural | The CW |
| 2008 **(35th)** | Terminator: The Sarah Connor Chronicles | Fox |
| 2009 **(36th)** | **Lost** | **ABC** |
| 2009 **(36th)** | Chuck | NBC |
| 2009 **(36th)** | Fringe | Fox |
| 2009 **(36th)** | Ghost Whisperer | CBS |
| 2009 **(36th)** | Heroes | NBC |
| 2009 **(36th)** | The Vampire Diaries | The CW |

=== 2010s ===
| Year | TV Series | Network |
|---|---|---|
| 2010 **(37th)** | **Fringe** | **Fox** |
| 2010 **(37th)** | Lost | ABC |
| 2010 **(37th)** | Smallville | The CW |
| 2010 **(37th)** | Supernatural | The CW |
| 2010 **(37th)** | V | ABC |
| 2010 **(37th)** | The Vampire Diaries | The CW |
| 2011 **(38th)** | **Fringe** | **Fox** |
| 2011 **(38th)** | A Gifted Man | CBS |
| 2011 **(38th)** | Grimm | NBC |
| 2011 **(38th)** | Once Upon a Time | ABC |
| 2011 **(38th)** | Supernatural | The CW |
| 2011 **(38th)** | Terra Nova | Fox |
| 2012 **(39th)** | **Revolution** | **NBC** |
| 2012 **(39th)** | Elementary | CBS |
| 2012 **(39th)** | The Following | Fox |
| 2012 **(39th)** | Fringe | Fox |
| 2012 **(39th)** | Once Upon a Time | ABC |
| 2012 **(39th)** | Supernatural | The CW |
| 2013 **(40th)** | **Hannibal** | **NBC** |
| 2013 **(40th)** | **Revolution** | **NBC** |
| 2013 **(40th)** | Agents of S.H.I.E.L.D. | ABC |
| 2013 **(40th)** | The Blacklist | NBC |
| 2013 **(40th)** | The Following | Fox |
| 2013 **(40th)** | Sleepy Hollow | Fox |
| 2013 **(40th)** | Under the Dome | CBS |
| 2014 **(41st)** | **Hannibal** | **NBC** |
| 2014 **(41st)** | The Blacklist | NBC |
| 2014 **(41st)** | The Following | Fox |
| 2014 **(41st)** | Grimm | NBC |
| 2014 **(41st)** | Person of Interest | CBS |
| 2014 **(41st)** | Sleepy Hollow | Fox |

== Most nominations ==
- 8 nominations - The X-Files (2 consecutive; 6 consecutive)
- 7 nominations:
  - Buffy the Vampire Slayer (consecutive)
  - Lost (consecutive)
  - The Simpsons (consecutive)
  - Smallville (6 consecutive)
- 6 nominations:
  - Angel (consecutive)
  - Star Trek: The Next Generation (consecutive)
  - Supernatural (2 consecutive; 3 consecutive)
- Fringe (consecutive)
- 4 nominations:
  - Heroes (consecutive)
  - Star Trek: Enterprise (consecutive)
- 3 nominations:
  - Alias (consecutive)
  - The Following (consecutive)
  - Star Trek: Voyager (2 consecutive)
  - Tales from the Crypt (2 consecutive)
- 2 nominations:
  - The Blacklist (consecutive)
  - CSI: Crime Scene Investigation (consecutive)
  - Dark Angel (consecutive)
  - Grimm
  - Hannibal (consecutive)
  - Once Upon a Time (consecutive)
  - Quantum Leap (consecutive)
  - Revolution (consecutive)
  - Roswell (consecutive)
  - Seven Days (consecutive)
  - Sleepy Hollow (consecutive)
  - Sliders (consecutive)
  - Star Trek: Deep Space Nine
  - Terminator: The Sarah Connor Chronicles (consecutive)
  - The Vampire Diaries (consecutive)
  - Veronica Mars (consecutive)

== Most wins ==
- 5 wins - Lost (2 consecutive; 3 consecutive)
- 3 wins:
  - Buffy the Vampire Slayer (2 consecutive)
  - The X-Files
- 2 wins:
  - Fringe (consecutive)
  - Hannibal (consecutive)
  - Revolution (consecutive)
  - Star Trek: The Next Generation (consecutive)

== See also ==
- Saturn Award for Best Action-Thriller Television Series
- Saturn Award for Best Animated Series or Film on Television
- Saturn Award for Best Fantasy Television Series
- Saturn Award for Best Horror Television Series
- Saturn Award for Best Science Fiction Television Series
- Saturn Award for Best Syndicated/Cable Television Series
- Saturn Award for Best Youth-Oriented Television Series
