= Karen Westerfield =

American make-up artist

Karen J. Westerfield is an American make-up artist. In 2022 she was elected business representative of the Make-Up Artists and Hair Stylists Guild, the top post for the guild; she was the first woman and the first person of color to be elected to that post.

== Career ==
Westerfield worked as a television makeup artist for Star Trek for twelve years. Among other Star Trek-related work, she did the makeup for Quark during all of Star Trek: Deep Space Nine. Armin Shimerman, who played Quark, said, "I always say that Karen [Westerfield] helped create Quark as much as I did." He also said of Westerfield, "It was her idea to put the maroon shading around my eyes. The makeup accented the eyes, so you could see the eyes better. The other Ferengi characters didn't have that, and it made a huge difference."

She has also worked on projects not related to Star Trek, such as Lackawanna Blues, for which she was nominated for an Emmy.

In 2022 Westerfield was elected business representative of the Make-Up Artists and Hair Stylists Guild, the top post for the guild; she was the first woman and the first person of color to be elected to that post. (She is half-Japanese.) She was previously the guild's recording-secretary, sergeant-at-arms, and vice president.

== Primetime Emmy Awards and nominations ==
She won an Emmy Award for Outstanding Individual Achievement in Makeup for a Series in 1992 for her work on Star Trek: The Next Generation, and won twice more at the Emmys in the same category, in 1993 and 1995, for her work on Star Trek: Deep Space Nine.

She was nominated for an Emmy Award for Outstanding Individual Achievement in Makeup for a Series in 1993 for her work on Star Trek: The Next Generation, and in 1994 for her work on Star Trek: Deep Space Nine. In 1997 she was nominated for an Emmy Award for Outstanding Makeup for a Miniseries or a Special for her work on Alien Nation: The Enemy Within. In 1998, 1998, and 1999 she was nominated for an Emmy Award for Outstanding Makeup for a Series for her work on Star Trek: Deep Space Nine, and in 2001 she was nominated for the same award for her prosthetic makeup work on Star Trek: Voyager. In 2002 she was nominated for an Emmy Award for Outstanding Makeup For A Series (Prosthetic) for her work on Enterprise. In 2005 she was nominated for an Emmy Award for Outstanding Makeup For A Miniseries, Movie Or A Special (non-prosthetic) for her work on Lackawanna Blues, sharing her nomination with Denise Pugh-Ruiz and Edna Sheen.
