= Danford B. Greene =

American film editor (1928–2015)

- Born: Danford Burris Greene; June 26, 1928; Wichita, Kansas, U.S.
- Died: August 13, 2015 (aged 87); Los Angeles, California, U.S.
- Occupation: film editor

Danford B. "Danny" Greene (June 26, 1928 – August 13, 2015) was an American film and television editor with about twenty five feature film credits. He was nominated for the Academy Award for Best Film Editing for MASH (1970-directed by Robert Altman) and, with John C. Howard, for Blazing Saddles (1974-directed by Mel Brooks).

Greene graduated from the University of Southern California in 1952. After assisting at Metro Goldwyn Mayer, he became the head of sound editing at Universal Studios, where he worked on Psycho (1960). In the 1960s Greene worked mostly as an editor for episodes of television series such as Thriller and Judd, for the Defense. He broke into feature films with That Cold Day in the Park (1969), which was directed by Robert Altman. The following year he edited MASH (1970) with Altman, which was an anti-war comedy that became a phenomenal success while the U.S. was still fighting the Vietnam War. The film was the third highest-grossing film in the U.S. in 1970, making more than $36 million in the U.S. on a budget of $3 million. Editing was an important aspect of the film's success. The film spawned a long-running television series, and in 1996 was listed on the National Film Registry.

Following MASH Greene worked regularly editing feature films through 1994, although he did not work with Robert Altman again. He directed one feature film The Secret Diary of Sigmund Freud (1984). Other films edited by Greene include Blazing Saddles (1974), Fun with Dick and Jane (1977), American Hot Wax (1978), and Rocky II (1979). Greene's last feature credit was for There Goes My Baby (1994), which was his fourth collaboration with director Floyd Mutrux. He then taught editing at the American Film Institute and the Los Angeles Film School.

Very early in his editing career, Greene was nominated for the American Cinema Editors Eddie award for a 1962 episode of the television series It's a Man's World. Greene's editing of MASH (1970) was widely recognized, and he was nominated for the Academy Award, the BAFTA Award and the Eddie award for the film. He was again nominated for the Academy Award for Blazing Saddles (1974).

== Selected filmography ==
Editor
Year	Film	Director	Notes
1956	Man in the Vault	Andrew V. McLaglen	
1969	That Cold Day in the Park	Robert Altman	First collaboration with Robert Altman
1970	M*A*S*H	Robert Altman	Second collaboration with Robert Altman
1970	Myra Breckinridge	Michael Sarne	
1971	Clay Pigeon	Lane Slate; Tom Stern	
1972	Deadhead Miles	Vernon Zimmerman	Uncredited
1973	Hex	Leo Garen	Uncredited
1974	Blazing Saddles	Mel Brooks	First collaboration with Mel Brooks
1975	Aloha, Bobby and Rose	Floyd Mutrux	First collaboration with Floyd Mutrux
1975	The Master Gunfighter	Tom Laughlin	
1976	The Killer Inside Me	Burt Kennedy	
1977	Fun with Dick and Jane	Ted Kotcheff	
1977	Outlaw Blues	Richard T. Heffron	
1977	Which Way Is Up?	Michael Schultz	
1979	Voices	Robert Markowitz	
1982	Partners	James Burrows	
1985	Head Office	Ken Finkleman	
1987	Love at Stake	John Moffitt	
1988	18 Again!	Paul Flaherty	First collaboration with Paul Flaherty
1988	Wildfire	Zalman King	
1989	Who's Harry Crumb?	Paul Flaherty	Second collaboration with Paul Flaherty
1990	Vital Signs	Marisa Silver	
1994	There Goes My Baby	Floyd Mutrux	Fourth collaboration with Floyd Mutrux

Editorial department
Year	Film	Director	Role	Notes
1972	Wild in the Sky	William T. Naud	Supervising editor	
1978	American Hot Wax	Floyd Mutrux	Supervising film editor	Second collaboration with Floyd Mutrux
1978	Loose Shoes	Ira Miller	Editorial supervisor	
1979	Rocky II	Sylvester Stallone	Supervising film editor	
1980	The Hollywood Knights	Floyd Mutrux	Supervising editor	Third collaboration with Floyd Mutrux
1981	History of the World, Part I	Mel Brooks	Additional editor	Second collaboration with Mel Brooks
1981	Surfacing	Claude Jutra	Editorial consultant	
1986	Never Too Young to Die	Gil Bettman	Additional editor	

Director
Year	Film
1984	The Secret Diary of Sigmund Freud

Shorts

Editorial department
Year	Film	Director	Role
2011	To Beauty	Jess Zakira Wise	Supervising editor

Thanks
Year	Film	Director	Role
2003	Frame of Mind	Simon Joecker	Special thanks
2008	Started by a Mouse	Michael Gaddie	Special thanks
2008	Ismeria	Karen A. Thompson	Very special thanks
2010	Montana	Nina Coppola; Jacob Stuart	Special thanks
2010	These Four Walls	Cédric Chabloz	Special thanks
2011	Frontman	Caleb C. Werntz	Special thanks
2011	Family First	Isaac Cherem	Special thanks
2013	Relevé	Vishal Solanki	Special thanks

TV movies

Editor
Year	Film	Director
1964	Nightmare in Chicago	Robert Altman

TV series

Editor
Year	Title	Notes
1960	Shotgun Slade	2 episodes
1961−62	Thriller	6 episodes
1962	It's a Man's World	8 episodes
1963−64	Alfred Hitchcock Presents	2 episodes
1963−64	Kraft Suspense Theatre	5 episodes
1964	McHale's Navy	2 episodes
1964	Bob Hope Presents the Chrysler Theatre	1 episode
1964−65	Broadside	29 episodes
1966	The Munsters	1 episode
1966	The Virginian	1 episode
1967	Mr. Terrific	4 episodes
1967−69	Judd, for the Defense	13 episodes

Thanks
Year	Title	Role	Notes
2011	Makin' It LA	Special thanks	6 episodes

TV specials

Editor
Year	Film	Director
1966	A Bob Hope Comedy Special	Jack Shea
