= 8th Saturn Awards =

US film and television awards ceremony

- Date: July 1981
- Site: California, U.S.

Highlights
- Most awards: The Empire Strikes Back (4)
- Most nominations: The Empire Strikes Back (8)

The 8th Saturn Awards, honoring the best in science fiction, fantasy and horror film in 1980, were held in July 1981.

== Winners and nominees ==
Below is a complete list of nominees and winners. Winners are highlighted in bold.

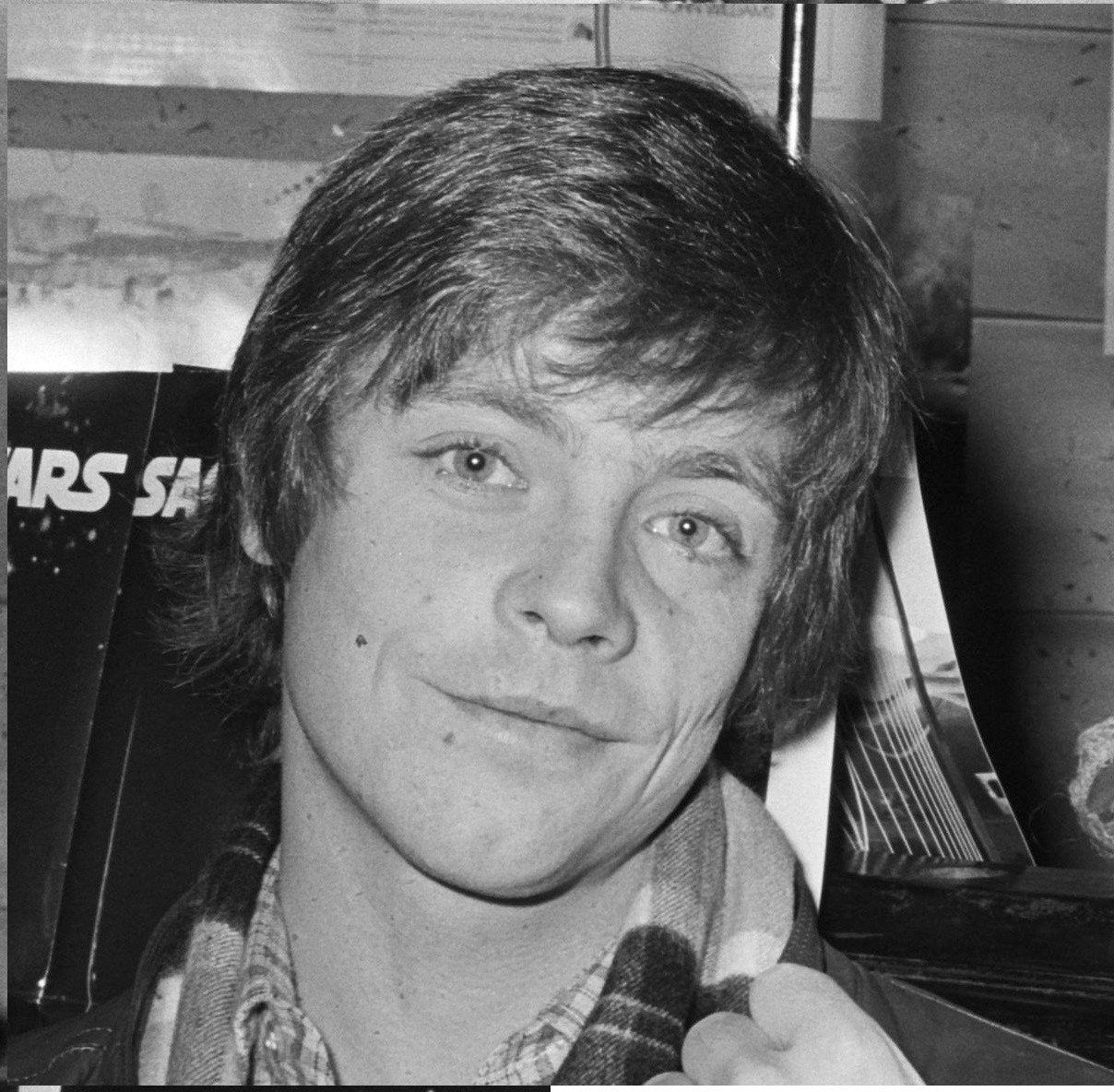
Mark Hamill, Best Actor winner

Angie Dickinson, Best Actress winner

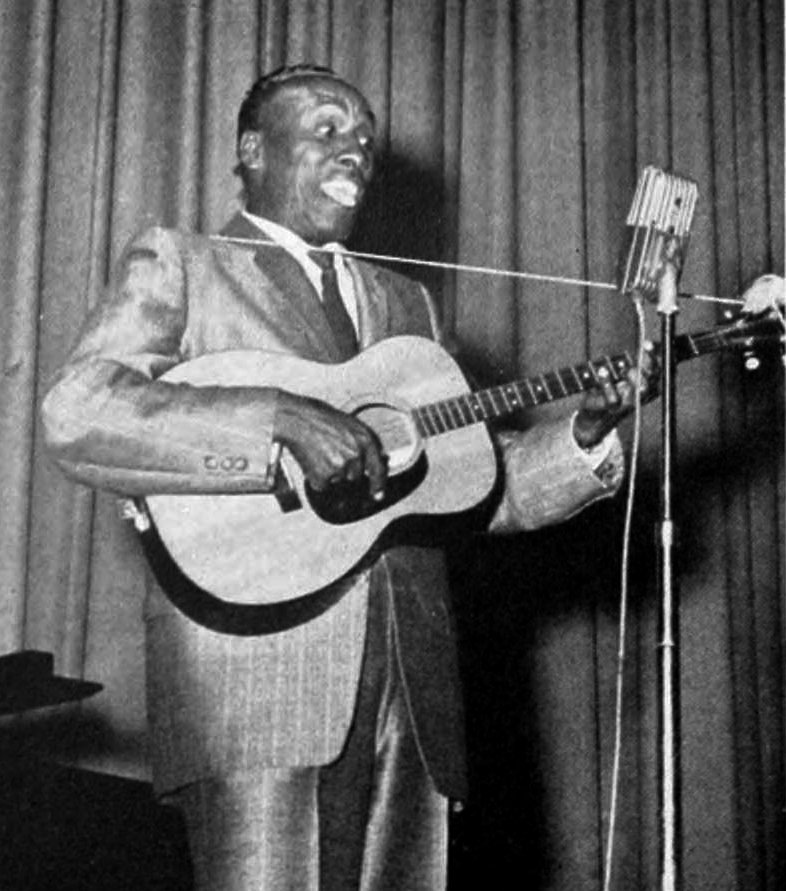
Scatman Crothers, Best Supporting Actor winner

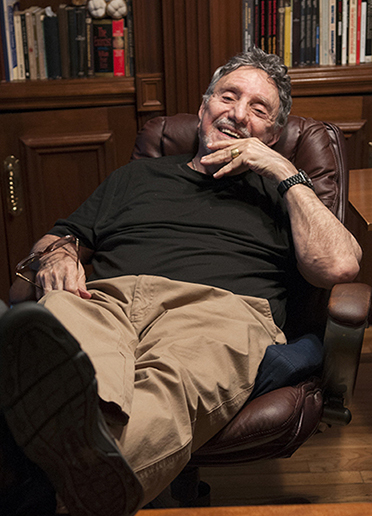
William Peter Blatty, Best Writing winner

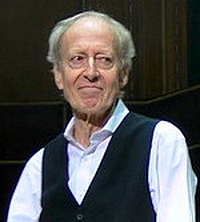
John Barry, Best Music winner

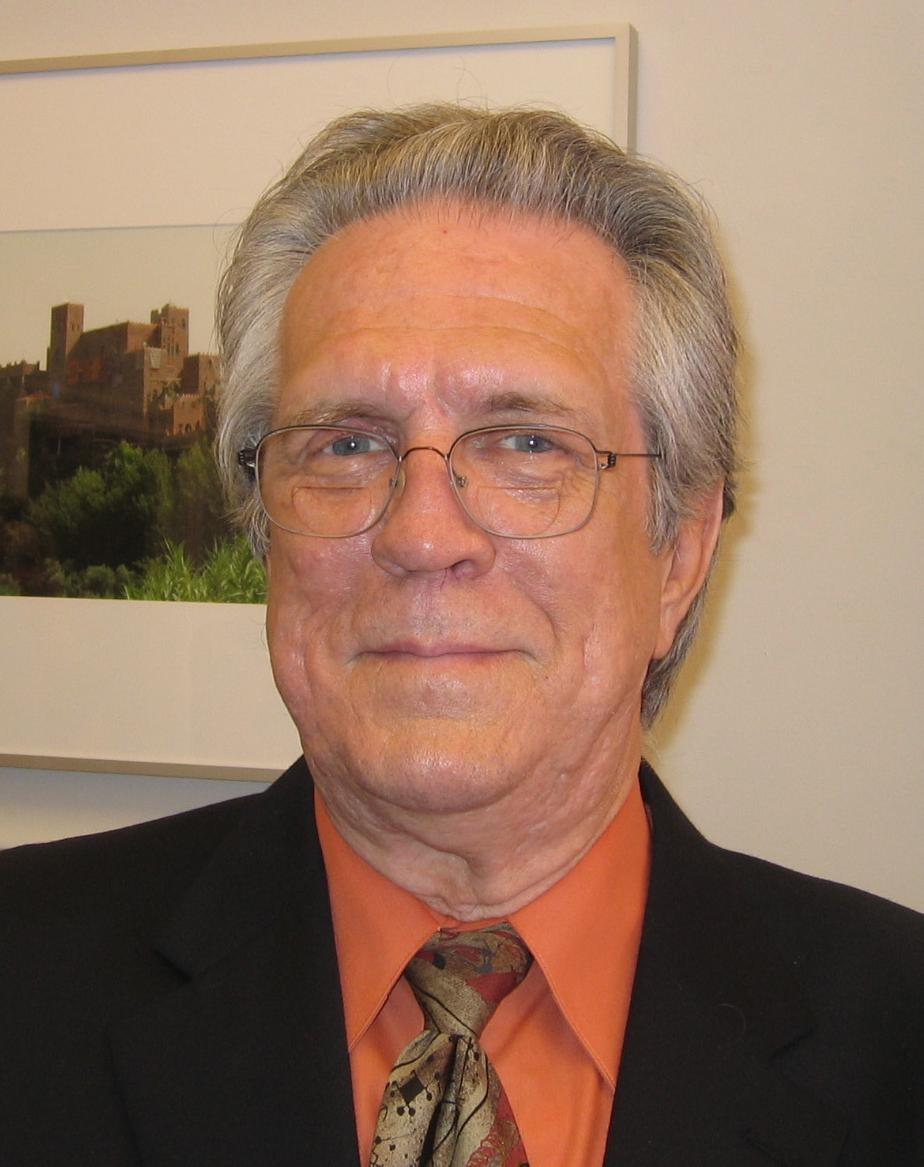
Richard Edlund, Best Special Effects co-winner

=== Film awards ===
| Best Science Fiction Film | Best Fantasy Film |
|---|---|
| **The Empire Strikes Back**; Altered States; Battle Beyond the Stars; The Final Countdown; Flash Gordon | **Somewhere in Time**; The Blue Lagoon; The Ninth Configuration; Oh, God! Book II; Popeye |
| Best Horror Film | Best International Film |
| **The Howling**; Dressed to Kill; Fade to Black; The Fog; The Shining | **Scanners**; The Changeling; Harlequin; Lupin III: The Castle of Cagliostro; Terror Train |
| Best Low-Budget Film | |
| **Scared to Death**; Forbidden Zone; Human Experiments; Maniac; Ms .45 | |
| Best Actor | Best Actress |
| **Mark Hamill – The Empire Strikes Back as Luke Skywalker**; Alan Arkin – Simon as Simon Mendelssohn; Dennis Christopher – Fade to Black as Eric Binford; Kirk Douglas – The Final Countdown as Capt. Matthew Yelland; Christopher Reeve – Somewhere in Time as Richard Collier | **Angie Dickinson – Dressed to Kill as Kate Miller**; Ellen Burstyn – Resurrection as Edna Mae McCauley; Jamie Lee Curtis – Terror Train as Alana Maxwell; Louanne – Oh, God! Book II as Tracy Richards; Jane Seymour – Somewhere in Time as Elise McKenna |
| Best Supporting Actor | Best Supporting Actress |
| **Scatman Crothers – The Shining as Dick Hallorann**; Melvyn Douglas – The Changeling as Joseph Carmichael; Martin Gabel – The First Deadly Sin as Christopher Langley; Max von Sydow – Flash Gordon as Emperor Ming the Merciless; Billy Dee Williams – The Empire Strikes Back as Lando Calrissian | **Eve Brent – Fade to Black as Stella Binford**; Linda Kerridge – Fade to Black as Marilyn O'Connor; Eva Le Gallienne – Resurrection as Grandma Pearl; Nancy Parsons – Motel Hell as Ida Smith; Stephanie Zimbalist – The Awakening as Margaret Corbeck |
| Best Director | Best Writing |
| **Irvin Kershner – The Empire Strikes Back**; Brian De Palma – Dressed to Kill; Stanley Kubrick – The Shining; Ken Russell – Altered States; Vernon Zimmerman – Fade to Black | **William Peter Blatty – The Ninth Configuration**; Leigh Brackett and Lawrence Kasdan – The Empire Strikes Back; Lewis John Carlino – Resurrection; Paddy Chayefsky (as Sidney Aaron) – Altered States; John Sayles – Alligator |
| Best Music | Best Costumes |
| **John Barry – Somewhere in Time**; Pino Donaggio – Dressed to Kill; John Williams – The Empire Strikes Back; Maurice Jarre – Resurrection; Béla Bartók – The Shining | **Jean-Pierre Dorleac – Somewhere in Time**; Durinda Wood – Battle Beyond the Stars; John Mollo – The Empire Strikes Back; Doris Lynn – Fade to Black; Danilo Donati – Flash Gordon |
| Best Make-up | Best Special Effects |
| **Dick Smith – Altered States / Dick Smith – Scanners (TIE)**; Sue Dolph, Steve Neill, and Rick Stratton – Battle Beyond the Stars; Colin Booker – Fade to Black; Rob Bottin and Rick Baker – The Howling; Giannetto De Rossi – Zombi 2 | **Brian Johnson and Richard Edlund – The Empire Strikes Back**; Chuck Comisky – Battle Beyond the Stars; Richard Albain Jr., Tommy Lee Wallace, and James F. Liles – The Fog; Dave Allen and Peter Kuran – The Howling; Gary Zeller – Scanners |

=== Special awards ===
==== Golden Scroll of Merit (Outstanding Achievement) ====
- Sybil Danning – Battle Beyond the Stars

==== Outstanding Film Award ====
- Harlequin

==== Best New Star Award ====
- Sam J. Jones

==== Life Career Award ====
- John Agar

==== Service Award ====
- Natalie Harris
