= Surf II =

1984 film by Randall M. Badat

- Theatrical poster
- Directed by: Randall M. Badat
- Written by: Randall M. Badat
- Produced by: George G. Braunstein; Ron Hamady
- Starring: Eddie Deezen; Linda Kerridge; Eric Stoltz; Jeffrey Rogers; Peter Isacksen
- Cinematography: Alex Phillips Jr.
- Edited by: Jacqueline Cambas
- Music by: Peter Bernstein
- Distributed by: Media Home Entertainment
- Release date: January 1984
- Running time: 91 minutes
- Language: English
- Budget: $2 million

Surf II is a 1984 American comedy film written and directed by Randall M. Badat and starring Eddie Deezen, Linda Kerridge, Eric Stoltz, Lyle Waggoner, Carol Wayne and Jeffrey Rogers. The plot follows two dim-witted surfers attempting to thwart the plans of a mad scientist attempting to rid the beaches of surfers by turning them into zombie punks through chemically altered soda pop.

A parody of 1960s-style beach party films, Surf II mixes elements of the science fiction, horror, surf and sex comedy genres, featuring a prominent soundtrack comprising both classic surf music and contemporary new wave. Although the film was received negatively by critics upon release, it has since been positively reappraised in cult film circles. In 2021, Vinegar Syndrome released a 2k restoration of the film on Blu-ray.

Despite the title's implication, Surf II is not a sequel and there was never a Surf I. The film was marketed with a number of subheadings, the most common of which was the tongue-in-cheek Surf II: The End of the Trilogy.

== Plot ==
Long ago in "The Good Old Days", surfers ruled. It was bitchin'! That was before the threat of chemical pollution, nuclear waste and the horror of Buzzz Cola.

Menlo Schwartzer was a high school genius who hated surfers. He invented a weird soft drink, involved local businessmen and set out to rule the coast. He nearly succeeded. This is the story of Buzzz Cola and Menlo's revenge.

Deep in his secret underwater laboratory, teenage mad scientist Menlo Schwartzer plots to rid the beaches of his greatest enemies: surfers. Having been driven to revenge following a cruel practical joke gone awry, Menlo concocts an addictive chemical agent which turns its drinkers into mutated, garbage-ingesting zombie punks. With the reluctant help of his girlfriend Sparkle and a pair of greedy, cigar-chomping soda businessmen, Menlo distributes the chemical under the guise of "Buzzz Cola", and one by one begins to build an army of brainless zombie slaves to do his bidding.

After several of their friends fall victim to Buzzz Cola, airheaded surfer dudes Chuck and Bob begin to piece together the parts of Menlo's evil scheme. Finding no help from their spaced-out parents or the bumbling efforts of the local police force, the two enlist the services of their eccentric science teacher and vow to stop Menlo for good, or else they will not be able to compete in the big surf contest this weekend.

== Cast ==
- Eddie Deezen as Menlo Schwartzer
- Linda Kerridge as "Sparkle" (credited as Florinda Budnik)
- Eric Stoltz as Chuck
- Jeffrey Rogers as Bob
- Peter Isacksen as Dr. Beaker
- Joshua Cadman as Johnny "Big Head"
- Tom Villard as Jocko O'Finley
- Corinne Bohrer as Cindy Lou
- Lucinda Dooling as Lindy Sue
- Ralph Seymour as Becker
- Cleavon Little as Principal "Daddy-O"
- Lyle Waggoner as Chief Boyardie
- Ron Palillo as Inspector "Underwear"
- Morgan Paull as Chuck's Dad
- Ruth Buzzi as Chuck's Mom
- Biff Manard as Bob's Dad
- Brandis Kemp as Bob's Mom
- Terry Kiser as Mr. O'Finley
- Carol Wayne as Mrs. O'Finley
- Lucy Lee Flippin as Mrs. Big Head
- Fred Asparagus as Fat Boy #1
- Jim Greenleaf as Fat Boy #2
- The Untouchables as Themselves
- Jed the Fish and The Poorman as Disc Jockeys
- Shaun Tomson and Skip Engblom as Surfers
- Brinke Stevens as Student (uncredited)

== Production ==
Writing

"We set out to make the most brain-dead movie of all time. In that regard, I believe we succeeded."

— Writer-director Randall Badat, reflecting on Surf II, from the 2010 book Destroy All Movies!!!

Director and screenwriter Randall Badat conceived the idea for Surf II while he was living in Venice, California during the early 1980s, drawing inspiration from stories about the colorful punk characters in his local surf scene and by incidents of contaminated water and chemical spills in the area. According to Badat, he had suffered a surfing injury to his face which necessitated the use of heavy painkillers; it was during this period of being "whacked out of [his] gourd on Demerol" that he discussed the concept of a satirical beach party movie he described as "Frankie and Annette Go to Hell" with his writer friends, who encouraged him to develop it into a screenplay. Badat wrote the first draft of the screenplay over the course of two days. Originally titled Surf Death: The Movie, the film was originally envisioned as "darker and more sinister", which Badat likened to a Russ Meyer film or "an '80s punk version of Abbott and Costello Meet Frankenstein".

After completing the screenplay, Badat's agent dismissed it as "the worst piece of shit [he'd] ever seen". Undeterred, Badat continued to shop the script around until it eventually caught the attention of independent film producers George Braunstein and Ron Hamady, who helped put together financing and eventually sold the project to production company Arista Films at the Cannes Film Festival. At this point, the film's title - which had been changed to Surf Trash - was again changed to Surf II, which Badat claims was a sarcastic extension on the trend of films featuring the subheading "The Movie". Arista had planned to film Surf II in 3-D; though several pre-production posters were made carrying the title Surf II 3-D, the idea was eventually scrapped after it was proven to be financially infeasible.

Casting

Badat wrote the role of Menlo Schwartzer specifically for Eddie Deezen, having been a fan of his performance in Robert Zemeckis' 1978 film I Wanna Hold Your Hand. According to Deezen, Menlo Schwartzer was named "Stinky Schwartzer" in the script until Deezen pressured Badat to change it. Linda Kerridge was brought onto the project from having acted on one of Braunstein and Hamady's previous productions, the 1980 slasher Fade to Black. Joshua Cadman was cast as "Johnny Big Head" after impressing producers by drinking an entire six pack of beer during his audition. According to Badat, the producers sought out Frankie Avalon and Annette Funicello to appear in the film, though both flatly refused. A musical performance by surf guitar icon Dick Dale was filmed but ultimately cut from the film's theatrical release. Dale's scene was restored for the director's cut of Surf II released in 2021.

Many of the film's comic actors - in particular Peter Isacksen, Biff Manard and Morgan Paull - were allowed to improvise much of their lines. Eddie Deezen contributed several odd props used in the film himself, including a baseball cap with an absurdly elongated brim and an oversized pair of novelty scissors.

Filming

Surf II was filmed in 29 days during the summer of 1983. Its beach scenes were shot at various locations throughout Venice, Malibu, Redondo Beach, Hermosa Beach and Manhattan Beach, while interior shots were filmed at a studio in Culver City and scenes at the Buzzz Cola factory were filmed at an abandoned waste treatment plant in El Segundo.

Following its completion, Surf II was continually rejected for studio distribution, ultimately forcing a re-edit of the film. Namely, this included several new shots and scenes of nudity and gross out gags inserted into the film to capitalize on the growing sex comedy trend successfully set by Porky's the year before. Badat was upset and even embarrassed by these changes, in particular the shots of gratuitous nudity: in a 2010 interview, he noted "[those] shots don't even match the rest of the film if you look at the cinematography". In 2021, distribution company Vinegar Syndrome would release a "director's cut" of Surf II running approximately 10 minutes longer than the theatrical cut, restoring Badat's original vision for the film.

== Release ==
Surf II premiered at the Coronet Theatre in Los Angeles. According to the cast and crew, a number of underage youths who were unable to get into the screening took their frustrations out on the building itself, tearing the theater's doors off the hinges and ultimately getting the film banned after one night.

Surf II was released theatrically in North America on January 13, 1984. It was marketed with the title Surf II: The End of the Trilogy, though later promotions re-titled the film Surf II: The Nerds Strike Back, following the success of Revenge of the Nerds, which was released later that summer. The film screened in Europe in the fall of 1984, retitled in Spain as Locura de playa (roughly translated as "Beach Madness").

On April 17, 2009, the New Beverly Cinema in Los Angeles presented a 25th anniversary screening of Surf II hosted by the Alamo Drafthouse, with Badat, Braunstein, Deezen and first assistant director D. Scott Easton in attendance.

Home video

Surf II was released on VHS in January 1985 through Media Home Entertainment, who retained its distribution rights until ceasing operations in 1992. In 2012, the film was briefly made available on Amazon as a manufacture-on-demand DVD by Up All Nite Films, though never received an official DVD release.

In July 2021, cult film distribution company Vinegar Syndrome released a two-disc Blu-ray edition of Surf II, featuring a 2K restoration of the original theatrical cut along with a 100-minute director's cut, an hour-long documentary on the making of the film and audio commentaries from Badat and Deezen.

== Critical reception ==
=== Contemporary review ===
Initial critical reviews of Surf II were overwhelmingly negative. In his Movie Guide, Leonard Maltin gave the film a 1.5 out of 5 star rating, writing that the "best joke is its title - there never was a Surf I". Kim Newman quipped in the Monthly Film Bulletin, "traditionally, sequels are never up to the standards of the original: Surf II, which is a sequel to nothing in particular, is therefore worse than anyone could possibly have imagined", calling it "incoherent" and "most dreadful". The Chicago Tribune called it "total trash" and the Los Angeles Times simply remarked "there was no Surf I - and with luck, there'll be no Surf III". One of the few positive reviews came from cult film critic Joe Bob Briggs in the Dallas Times Herald, who awarded it 3.5 stars out of 4, praising the film's offbeat humor and original mix of genres.

Professional contemporary reviews have fared equally as poorly. Allmovie, though having rated Surf II one star out of five, noted that the film is "never dull" and "deranged enough to be memorable", giving praise to the performances of the ensemble cast and summarizing, "Surf II's unbalanced mix of amateurishness and gonzo humor will confound most viewers, but fans of B-movie weirdness will find more than enough memorable moments to keep themselves entertained".

Randall Badat himself has spoken about the negative reaction to Surf II and how it extended beyond film critics: "The target audience loved it. Their parents hated it. My family hated it. People that I was doing other business with hated it. I remember going to meetings and people would find out that I'd done this movie and that was it". He has also expressed an overall disappointment with the film, remarking "If there's anything I would have done differently... I'd have done everything differently", though ultimately admitting "I guess it's pretty funny.... I'm amazed at how well the film still plays, and I guess it works overall".

=== Cult status ===
Over the decades, Surf II gradually obtained an enthusiastic following in cult film circles. Mike "McBeardo" McPadden, host of McBeardo's Midnight Movies, ranked Surf II on his list of "15 Movies That Deserve Massive Cult Followings", calling the film "serious competition" for the position of the "#1 most off-the-wall and ingenious teen sex comedy of the ’80s", praising it further in his 2019 book Teen Movie Hell, writing "[Surf II] never slows down and it never lets up. The jokes fly at tsunami speed and volume, with everything perfectly delivered by comedy pros who admirably go all-in on the absurdity". Alamo Drafthouse programmers Zack Carlson and Bryan Connolly prominently featured Surf II in their book Destroy All Movies!!! The Complete Guide to Punks on Film, offering a rave review of Surf II as the "greatest mohawked-zombie-comedy ever made", calling it "pure fun in the form of a movie, born at a short-lived moment in history where culture was low and damaged enough to sustain a comedy of this magnitude. No joke is too easy or bizarre but the film manages to excel with countless deeply creative moments", while also praising the "career best" performance of Deezen and the "powerful comic work" of its ensemble cast.

Following the film's Blu-ray release in 2021, Surf II was again rediscovered and re-appraised by cult film critics and audiences. Rock! Shock! Pop! wrote that "Surf II is every bit as dumb as it sounds but it's pretty much impossible not to have a good time", singling out the comic cast as its greatest strength, particularly the "zany enthusiasm" of Deezen and Isacksen. Inside Pulse rated the film 4 out of 5 stars, calling it "great goofy fun", again complimenting the ensemble cast and noting that it was a perfect companion to such '80s comedies as Fast Times at Ridgemont High and The Wild Life. Horror Society described the film as "a lot of fun", praising the film's "bat shit crazy" sensibilities and even lamenting the fact that there wasn't a Surf I, noting "I would love to have more of this zany story". DVD Drive-In was a bit more indifferent, writing that "the comedy is never quite punchy" and feeling most of the ensemble cast was squandered, though ultimately believed the film was "naughtier and funnier" than similarly beach-themed '80s films like Back to the Beach.

== Soundtrack ==
Surf II's soundtrack consists mainly of contemporary punk and New Wave and vintage surf music. The producers had initially struck a deal with Capitol Records for the release of a soundtrack album, and though the film's end credits state one to exist, as a result of the film's critical and financial disappointment, plans for an accompanying soundtrack were scrapped.

New wave band Oingo Boingo wrote the song "Hold Me Back" for Surf II, and has never been officially released outside of the movie's soundtrack.

The following is a list of songs which appear in Surf II:

- "I Get Around" - The Beach Boys
- "Stoked" - The Beach Boys
- "Surfin' U.S.A." - The Beach Boys
- "Pipeline" - The Chantays
- "Moral Majority" - The Circle Jerks
- "A.W.O.L." - Deserters
- "The Wedge" - Dick Dale
- "She Blinded Me With Science" - Thomas Dolby
- "Fuel Injected" - Jon & the Nightriders
- "Surf Jam" - Jon & the Nightriders
- "Hold Me Back" - Oingo Boingo
- "Only a Lad" - Oingo Boingo
- "Cry" - Johnnie Ray
- "Fan Fan Fanatish" - Rheingold
- "Six Months In A Leaky Boat" - Split Enz
- "Built for Speed" - Stray Cats
- "Talk Talk" - Talk Talk
- "Dancebeat" - The Untouchables
- "Hawaii Five-O" - The Ventures
- "Mexican Radio" - Wall of Voodoo
