= Saturn Award for Best Supporting Actress =

Annual US film award

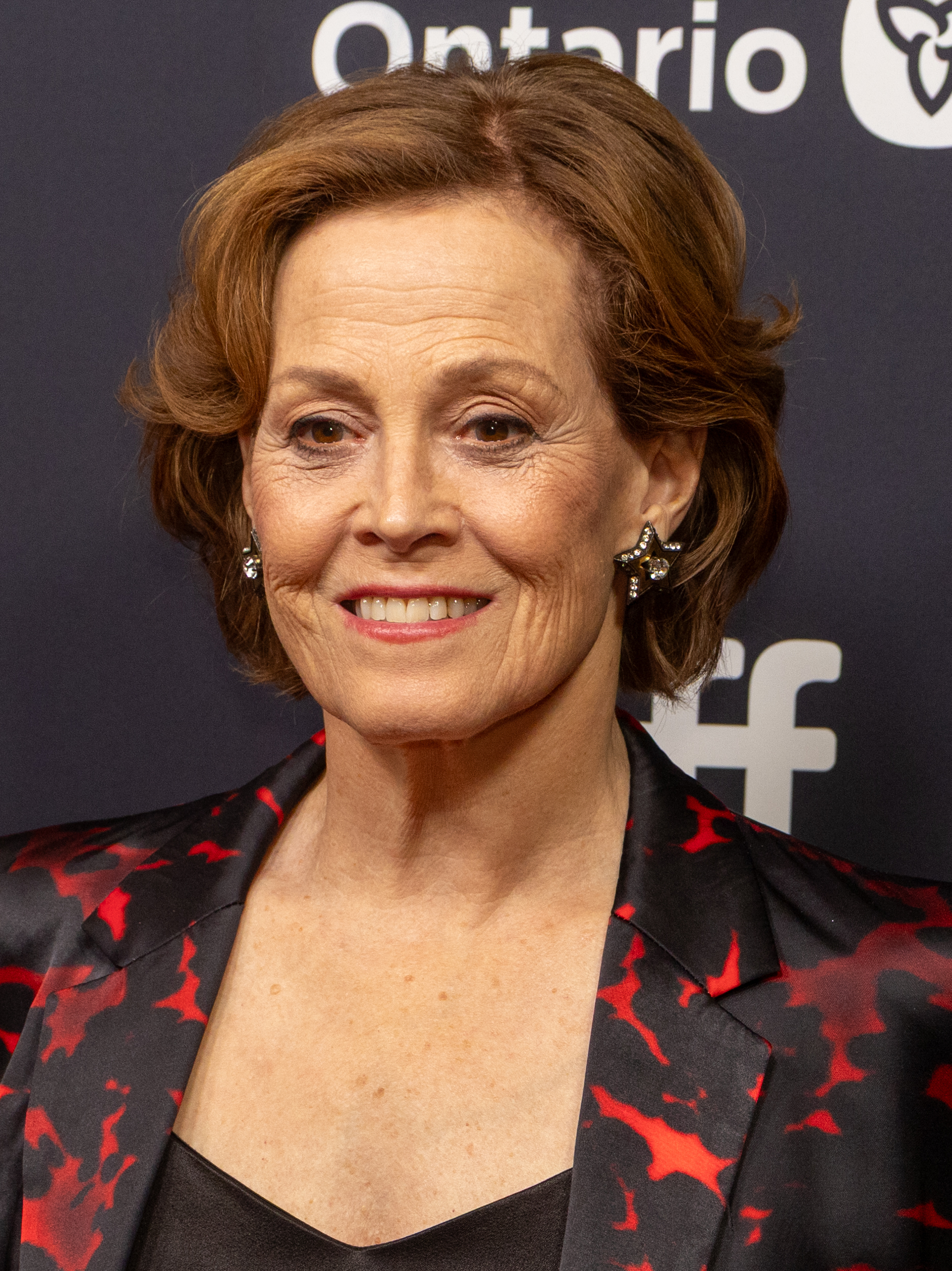
- Awarded for: Best performance of the year by a female in a supporting role in a genre film
- Country: United States
- Presented by: Academy of Science Fiction, Fantasy and Horror Films
- First award: 1974/75
- Currently held by: Sigourney Weaver for Dust Bunny (2024/2025)
- Website: saturnawards.org

The following is a list of Saturn Award nominees and winners for Best Supporting Actress, which rewards the best female supporting performance in a genre film. Anne Ramsey, Tilda Swinton, Emily Blunt, and Sigourney Weaver are the only actresses to win this award multiple times (twice), while only Whoopi Goldberg and Mercedes Ruehl have won both the Saturn Award and the Academy Award for Best Supporting Actress for the same role.

== Winners and nominees ==
=== 1970s ===
Year	Actress	Motion Picture	Character
1974/1975 (3rd)	Ida Lupino	The Devil's Rain	Mrs. Preston
1976 (4th)	Bette Davis	Burnt Offerings	Aunt Elizabeth
1977 (5th)	Susan Tyrrell	Bad	Mary Aiken
1977 (5th)	Joan Bennett	Suspiria	Madame Blanc
1977 (5th)	Teri Garr	Close Encounters of the Third Kind	Ronnie Neary
1977 (5th)	Alexis Smith	The Little Girl Who Lives Down the Lane	Mrs. Hallet
1977 (5th)	Margaret Whiting	Sinbad and the Eye of the Tiger	Zenobia
1978 (6th)	Dyan Cannon	Heaven Can Wait	Julia Farnsworth
1978 (6th)	Uta Hagen	The Boys from Brazil	Frieda Maloney
1978 (6th)	Mabel King	The Wiz	Evillene
1978 (6th)	Valerie Perrine	Superman	Eve Teschmacher
1978 (6th)	Brenda Vaccaro	Capricorn One	Kay Brubaker
1979 (7th)	Veronica Cartwright	Alien	Lambert
1979 (7th)	Pamela Hensley	Buck Rogers in the 25th Century	Princess Ardala
1979 (7th)	Jacquelyn Hyde	The Dark	De Renzy
1979 (7th)	Marcy Lafferty	The Day Time Ended	Beth
1979 (7th)	Nichelle Nichols	Star Trek: The Motion Picture	Lt. Cmdr. Uhura

=== 1980s ===
Year	Actress	Motion Picture	Character
1980 (8th)	Eve Brent	Fade to Black	Aunt Stella Binford
1980 (8th)	Linda Kerridge	Fade to Black	Marilyn O'Connor
1980 (8th)	Eva Le Gallienne	Resurrection	Grandma Pearl
1980 (8th)	Nancy Parsons	Motel Hell	Ida Smith
1980 (8th)	Stephanie Zimbalist	The Awakening	Margaret Corbeck
1981 (9th)	Frances Sternhagen	Outland	Dr. Lazarus
1981 (9th)	Viveca Lindfors	The Hand	Doctress
1981 (9th)	Helen Mirren	Excalibur	Morgana
1981 (9th)	Kyle Richards	The Watcher in the Woods	Ellie Curtis
1981 (9th)	Maggie Smith	Clash of the Titans	Thetis
1982 (10th)	Zelda Rubinstein	Poltergeist	Tangina Barrons
1982 (10th)	Kirstie Alley	Star Trek II: The Wrath of Khan	Lt. Saavik
1982 (10th)	Filomena Spagnuolo	The Last Horror Film	Vinny's Mother
1982 (10th)	Dee Wallace	E.T. the Extra-Terrestrial	Mary
1982 (10th)	Irene Worth	Deathtrap	Helga ten Dorp
1983 (11th)	Candy Clark	Blue Thunder	Kate
1983 (11th)	Maud Adams	Octopussy	Octopussy
1983 (11th)	Annette O'Toole	Superman III	Lana Lang
1983 (11th)	Meg Tilly	Psycho II	Mary Loomis
1983 (11th)	Natalie Wood (posthumously)	Brainstorm	Karen Brace
1984 (12th)	Polly Holliday	Gremlins	Ruby Deagle
1984 (12th)	Kirstie Alley	Runaway	Jackie Rogers
1984 (12th)	Judith Anderson	Star Trek III: The Search for Spock	Vulcan High Priestess
1984 (12th)	Grace Jones	Conan the Destroyer	Zula
1984 (12th)	Mary Woronov	Night of the Comet	Audrey
1985 (13th)	Anne Ramsey	The Goonies	Mama Fratelli
1985 (13th)	Ruth Gordon (posthumously)	Maxie	Mrs. Lavin
1985 (13th)	Grace Jones	A View to a Kill	May Day
1985 (13th)	Lea Thompson	Back to the Future	Lorraine Baines
1985 (13th)	Gwen Verdon	Cocoon	Bess McCarthy
1986 (14th)	Jenette Goldstein	Aliens	Private Vasquez
1986 (14th)	Catherine Hicks	Star Trek IV: The Voyage Home	Doctor Gillian Taylor
1986 (14th)	Grace Jones	Vamp	Katrina
1986 (14th)	Kay Lenz	House	Sandy Sinclair
1986 (14th)	Vanity	52 Pick-Up	Doreen
1987 (15th)	Anne Ramsey (posthumously)	Throw Momma from the Train	Momma Lift
1987 (15th)	Lisa Bonet	Angel Heart	Epiphany Proudfoot
1987 (15th)	Veronica Cartwright	The Witches of Eastwick	Felicia Alden
1987 (15th)	Louise Fletcher	Flowers in the Attic	Olivia Foxworth
1987 (15th)	Jenette Goldstein	Near Dark	Diamondback
1987 (15th)	Dorothy Lamour	Creepshow 2 (Segment: "Old Chief Wood'nhead")	Martha Spruce
1988 (16th)	Sylvia Sidney	Beetlejuice	Juno
1988 (16th)	Joanna Cassidy	Who Framed Roger Rabbit	Dolores
1988 (16th)	Katherine Helmond	Lady in White	Amanda Harper
1988 (16th)	Clare Higgins	Hellbound: Hellraiser II	Julia Cotton
1988 (16th)	Jean Marsh	Willow	Queen Bavmorda
1988 (16th)	Zelda Rubinstein	Poltergeist III	Tangina Barrons
1988 (16th)	Meredith Salenger	The Kiss	Amy
1989/1990 (17th)	Whoopi Goldberg	Ghost	Oda Mae Brown
1989/1990 (17th)	Kim Basinger	Batman	Vicki Vale
1989/1990 (17th)	Finn Carter	Tremors	Rhonda LeBeck
1989/1990 (17th)	Reba McEntire	Tremors	Heather Gummer
1989/1990 (17th)	Julia Roberts	Flatliners	Rachel Mannus
1989/1990 (17th)	Jenny Seagrove	The Guardian	Camilla
1989/1990 (17th)	Mary Steenburgen	Back to the Future Part III	Clara Clayton
1989/1990 (17th)	Rachel Ticotin	Total Recall	Melina
1989/1990 (17th)	Mai Zetterling	The Witches	Helga Eveshim

=== 1990s ===
Year	Actress	Motion Picture	Character
1991 (18th)	Mercedes Ruehl	The Fisher King	Anne Napolitano
1991 (18th)	Robin Bartlett	If Looks Could Kill	Patricia Grober
1991 (18th)	Jennifer Connelly	The Rocketeer	Jenny Blake
1991 (18th)	Mary Elizabeth Mastrantonio	Robin Hood: Prince of Thieves	Marian Dubois
1991 (18th)	Frances Sternhagen	Misery	Virginia
1991 (18th)	Dianne Wiest	Edward Scissorhands	Peg Boggs
1992 (19th)	Isabella Rossellini	Death Becomes Her	Lisle Von Rhuman
1992 (19th)	Kim Cattrall	Star Trek VI: The Undiscovered Country	Lt. Valeris
1992 (19th)	Julianne Moore	The Hand That Rocks the Cradle	Marlene Craven
1992 (19th)	Rene Russo	Freejack	Julie Redlund
1992 (19th)	Frances Sternhagen	Raising Cain	Dr Lynn Waldheim
1992 (19th)	Marcia Strassman	Honey, I Blew Up the Kid	Diane Szalinski
1992 (19th)	Robin Wright	Toys	Gwen Tyler
1993 (20th)	Amanda Plummer	Needful Things	Nettie Cobb
1993 (20th)	Nancy Allen	RoboCop 3	Officer Anne Lewis
1993 (20th)	Joan Cusack	Addams Family Values	Debbie Jellinsky
1993 (20th)	Julie Harris	The Dark Half	Reggie Delesseps
1993 (20th)	Kathy Najimy	Hocus Pocus	Mary Sanderson
1993 (20th)	Sarah Jessica Parker	Hocus Pocus	Sarah Sanderson
1993 (20th)	Kyra Sedgwick	Heart and Souls	Julia
1993 (20th)	Alfre Woodard	Heart and Souls	Penny Washington
1994 (21st)	Mia Sara	Timecop	Melissa Walker
1994 (21st)	Halle Berry	The Flintstones	Miss Stone
1994 (21st)	Tia Carrere	True Lies	Juno Skinner
1994 (21st)	Whoopi Goldberg	Star Trek Generations	Guinan
1994 (21st)	Rosie O'Donnell	The Flintstones	Betty Rubble
1994 (21st)	Robin Wright	Forrest Gump	Jenny Curran
1995 (22nd)	Bonnie Hunt	Jumanji	Sarah Whittle
1995 (22nd)	Illeana Douglas	To Die For	Janice Maretto
1995 (22nd)	Salma Hayek	Desperado	Carolina
1995 (22nd)	Jennifer Jason Leigh	Dolores Claiborne	Selena St. George
1995 (22nd)	Juliette Lewis	From Dusk till Dawn	Kate Fuller
1995 (22nd)	Gwyneth Paltrow	Seven	Tracy Mills
1996 (23rd)	Alice Krige	Star Trek: First Contact	Borg Queen
1996 (23rd)	Fairuza Balk	The Craft	Nancy Downs
1996 (23rd)	Drew Barrymore	Scream	Casey Becker
1996 (23rd)	Glenn Close	101 Dalmatians	Cruella de Vil
1996 (23rd)	Pam Ferris	Matilda	Agatha Trunchbull
1996 (23rd)	Vivica A. Fox	Independence Day	Jasmine Dubrow
1996 (23rd)	Jennifer Tilly	Bound	Violet
1997 (24th)	Gloria Stuart	Titanic	Rose DeWitt Bukater (Old)
1997 (24th)	Joan Allen	Face/Off	Dr. Eve Archer
1997 (24th)	Courteney Cox	Scream 2	Gale Weathers
1997 (24th)	Teri Hatcher	Tomorrow Never Dies	Paris Carver
1997 (24th)	Milla Jovovich	The Fifth Element	Leeloo
1997 (24th)	Winona Ryder	Alien: Resurrection	Annalee Call
1998 (25th)	Joan Allen	Pleasantville	Betty Parker
1998 (25th)	Claire Forlani	Meet Joe Black	Susan Parrish
1998 (25th)	Anne Heche	Psycho	Marion Crane
1998 (25th)	Anjelica Huston	Ever After	Baroness Rodmilla de Ghent
1998 (25th)	Sheryl Lee	Vampires	Katrina
1998 (25th)	Charlize Theron	Mighty Joe Young	Jill Young
1999 (26th)	Patricia Clarkson	The Green Mile	Melinda Moores
1999 (26th)	Pernilla August	Star Wars: Episode I – The Phantom Menace	Shmi Skywalker
1999 (26th)	Joan Cusack	Arlington Road	Cheryl Lang
1999 (26th)	Geena Davis	Stuart Little	Eleanor Little
1999 (26th)	Miranda Richardson	Sleepy Hollow	Lady Van Tassel / Crone
1999 (26th)	Sissy Spacek	Blast from the Past	Helen Webber

=== 2000s ===
Year	Actress	Motion Picture	Character
2000 (27th)	Rebecca Romijn-Stamos	X-Men	Raven Darkholme / Mystique
2000 (27th)	Cameron Diaz	Charlie's Angels	Natalie Cook
2000 (27th)	Lucy Liu	Charlie's Angels	Alex Munday
2000 (27th)	Rene Russo	The Adventures of Rocky and Bullwinkle	Natasha Fatale
2000 (27th)	Hilary Swank	The Gift	Valerie Barksdale
2000 (27th)	Zhang Ziyi	Crouching Tiger, Hidden Dragon	Jen Yu
2001 (28th)	Fionnula Flanagan	The Others	Mrs. Bertha Mills
2001 (28th)	Monica Bellucci	Brotherhood of the Wolf	Sylvia
2001 (28th)	Helena Bonham Carter	Planet of the Apes	Ari
2001 (28th)	Cameron Diaz	Vanilla Sky	Julie Gianni
2001 (28th)	Frances McDormand	The Man Who Wasn't There	Doris Crane
2001 (28th)	Maggie Smith	Harry Potter and the Philosopher's Stone	Minerva McGonagall
2002 (29th)	Samantha Morton	Minority Report	Agatha
2002 (29th)	Halle Berry	Die Another Day	Jinx Johnson
2002 (29th)	Connie Nielsen	One Hour Photo	Nina Yorkin
2002 (29th)	Rachel Roberts	Simone	Simone
2002 (29th)	Sissy Spacek	Tuck Everlasting	Mae Tuck
2002 (29th)	Emily Watson	Red Dragon	Reba McClane
2003 (30th)	Ellen DeGeneres	Finding Nemo	Dory (voice)
2003 (30th)	Keira Knightley	Pirates of the Caribbean: The Curse of the Black Pearl	Elizabeth Swann
2003 (30th)	Lucy Liu	Kill Bill: Volume 1	O-Ren Ishii
2003 (30th)	Kristanna Loken	Terminator 3: Rise of the Machines	T-X
2003 (30th)	Miranda Otto	The Lord of the Rings: The Return of the King	Éowyn
2003 (30th)	Peta Wilson	The League of Extraordinary Gentlemen	Mina Harker
2004 (31st)	Daryl Hannah	Kill Bill: Volume 2	Elle Driver
2004 (31st)	Kim Basinger	Cellular	Jessica Martin
2004 (31st)	Irma P. Hall	The Ladykillers	Marva Munson
2004 (31st)	Angelina Jolie	Sky Captain and the World of Tomorrow	Francesca "Franky" Cook
2004 (31st)	Diane Kruger	National Treasure	Abigail Chase
2004 (31st)	Meryl Streep	The Manchurian Candidate	Eleanor Shaw
2005 (32nd)	Summer Glau	Serenity	River Tam
2005 (32nd)	Jessica Alba	Sin City	Nancy Callahan
2005 (32nd)	Jennifer Carpenter	The Exorcism of Emily Rose	Emily Rose
2005 (32nd)	Katie Holmes	Batman Begins	Rachel Dawes
2005 (32nd)	Michelle Monaghan	Kiss Kiss Bang Bang	Harmony Faith Lane
2005 (32nd)	Gena Rowlands	The Skeleton Key	Violet Devereaux
2006 (33rd)	Famke Janssen	X-Men: The Last Stand	Jean Grey / Phoenix
2006 (33rd)	Cate Blanchett	Notes on a Scandal	Sheba Hart
2006 (33rd)	Eva Green	Casino Royale	Vesper Lynd
2006 (33rd)	Rachel Hurd-Wood	Perfume: The Story of a Murderer	Laura Richis
2006 (33rd)	Parker Posey	Superman Returns	Kitty Kowalski
2006 (33rd)	Emma Thompson	Stranger than Fiction	Karen Eiffel
2007 (34th)	Marcia Gay Harden	The Mist	Mrs. Carmody
2007 (34th)	Lizzy Caplan	Cloverfield	Marlena Diamond
2007 (34th)	Lena Headey	300	Queen Gorgo
2007 (34th)	Rose McGowan	Grindhouse (Segment: Planet Terror)	Cherry Darling
2007 (34th)	Michelle Pfeiffer	Stardust	Lamia
2007 (34th)	Imelda Staunton	Harry Potter and the Order of the Phoenix	Dolores Umbridge
2008 (35th)	Tilda Swinton	The Curious Case of Benjamin Button	Elizabeth Abbott
2008 (35th)	Joan Allen	Death Race	Claire Hennessey
2008 (35th)	Judi Dench	Quantum of Solace	M
2008 (35th)	Olga Kurylenko	Quantum of Solace	Camille Montes
2008 (35th)	Charlize Theron	Hancock	Mary Embrey
2008 (35th)	Carice van Houten	Valkyrie	Nina von Stauffenberg
2009 (36th)	Sigourney Weaver	Avatar	Dr. Grace Augustine
2009 (36th)	Malin Åkerman	Watchmen	Laurie Jupiter / Silk Spectre II
2009 (36th)	Diane Kruger	Inglourious Basterds	Bridget von Hammersmark
2009 (36th)	Rachel McAdams	Sherlock Holmes	Irene Adler
2009 (36th)	Lorna Raver	Drag Me to Hell	Mrs. Sylvia Ganush
2009 (36th)	Susan Sarandon	The Lovely Bones	Grandma Lynn

=== 2010s ===
Year	Actress	Motion Picture	Character
2010 (37th)	Mila Kunis	Black Swan	Lily / The Black Swan
2010 (37th)	Scarlett Johansson	Iron Man 2	Natalie Rushman / Natasha Romanoff
2010 (37th)	Keira Knightley	Never Let Me Go	Ruth C
2010 (37th)	Helen Mirren	RED	Victoria Winslow
2010 (37th)	Vanessa Redgrave	Letters to Juliet	Claire Smith-Wyman
2010 (37th)	Jacki Weaver	Animal Kingdom	Janine 'Smurf' Cody
2011 (38th)	Emily Blunt	The Adjustment Bureau	Elise Sellas
2011 (38th)	Elena Anaya	The Skin I Live In	Vera Cruz
2011 (38th)	Charlotte Gainsbourg	Melancholia	Claire
2011 (38th)	Paula Patton	Mission: Impossible – Ghost Protocol	Jane Carter
2011 (38th)	Lin Shaye	Insidious	Elise Rainier
2011 (38th)	Emma Watson	Harry Potter and the Deathly Hallows – Part 2	Hermione Granger
2012 (39th)	Anne Hathaway	The Dark Knight Rises	Selina Kyle / Catwoman
2012 (39th)	Judi Dench	Skyfall	M
2012 (39th)	Gina Gershon	Killer Joe	Sharla Smith
2012 (39th)	Anne Hathaway	Les Misérables	Fantine
2012 (39th)	Nicole Kidman	The Paperboy	Charlotte Bless
2012 (39th)	Charlize Theron	Snow White and the Huntsman	Queen Ravenna
2013 (40th)	Scarlett Johansson	Her	Samantha (voice)
2013 (40th)	Nicole Kidman	Stoker	Evelyn Stoker
2013 (40th)	Melissa Leo	Prisoners	Holly Jones
2013 (40th)	Evangeline Lilly	The Hobbit: The Desolation of Smaug	Tauriel
2013 (40th)	Jena Malone	The Hunger Games: Catching Fire	Johanna Mason
2013 (40th)	Emily Watson	The Book Thief	Rosa Hubermann
2014 (41st)	Rene Russo	Nightcrawler	Nina Romina
2014 (41st)	Jessica Chastain	Interstellar	Murphy "Murph" Cooper
2014 (41st)	Scarlett Johansson	Captain America: The Winter Soldier	Natasha Romanoff / Black Widow
2014 (41st)	Evangeline Lilly	The Hobbit: The Battle of the Five Armies	Tauriel
2014 (41st)	Emma Stone	Birdman	Sam Thomson
2014 (41st)	Meryl Streep	Into the Woods	The Witch
2015 (42nd)	Jessica Chastain	Crimson Peak	Lady Lucille Sharpe
2015 (42nd)	Carrie Fisher	Star Wars: The Force Awakens	General Leia Organa
2015 (42nd)	Evangeline Lilly	Ant-Man	Hope van Dyne
2015 (42nd)	Lupita Nyong'o	Star Wars: The Force Awakens	Maz Kanata
2015 (42nd)	Tamannaah Bhatia	Baahubali: The Beginning	Avanthika
2015 (42nd)	Alicia Vikander	Ex Machina	Ava
2016 (43rd)	Tilda Swinton	Doctor Strange	The Ancient One
2016 (43rd)	Betty Buckley	Split	Dr. Karen Fletcher
2016 (43rd)	Bryce Dallas Howard	Gold	Kay
2016 (43rd)	Scarlett Johansson	Captain America: Civil War	Natasha Romanoff / Black Widow
2016 (43rd)	Kate McKinnon	Ghostbusters	Dr. Jillian "Holtz" Holtzmann
2016 (43rd)	Margot Robbie	Suicide Squad	Harleen Quinzel / Harley Quinn
2017 (44th)	Danai Gurira	Black Panther	Okoye
2017 (44th)	Ana de Armas	Blade Runner 2049	Joi
2017 (44th)	Carrie Fisher (posthumously)	Star Wars: The Last Jedi	General Leia Organa
2017 (44th)	Lois Smith	Marjorie Prime	Marjorie
2017 (44th)	Octavia Spencer	The Shape of Water	Zelda Delilah Fuller
2017 (44th)	Tessa Thompson	Thor: Ragnarok	Valkyrie
2017 (44th)	Kelly Marie Tran	Star Wars: The Last Jedi	Rose Tico
2018/2019 (45th)	Zendaya	Spider-Man: Far From Home	MJ
2018/2019 (45th)	Cynthia Erivo	Bad Times at the El Royale	Darlene Sweet
2018/2019 (45th)	Karen Gillan	Avengers: Endgame	Nebula
2018/2019 (45th)	Amber Heard	Aquaman	Mera
2018/2019 (45th)	Scarlett Johansson	Avengers: Endgame	Natasha Romanoff / Black Widow
2018/2019 (45th)	Naomi Scott	Aladdin	Princess Jasmine
2018/2019 (45th)	Hailee Steinfeld	Bumblebee	Charlie Watson
2019/2020 (46th)	Ana de Armas	Knives Out	Marta Cabrera
2019/2020 (46th)	Zazie Beetz	Joker	Sophie Dumond
2019/2020 (46th)	Ellen Burstyn	Lucy in the Sky	Nana Holbrook
2019/2020 (46th)	Jamie Lee Curtis	Knives Out	Linda Drysdale
2019/2020 (46th)	Linda Hamilton	Terminator: Dark Fate	Sarah Connor
2019/2020 (46th)	Amanda Seyfried	Mank	Marion Davies
2019/2020 (46th)	Jurnee Smollett	Birds of Prey	Dinah Lance / Black Canary

=== 2020s ===
Year	Actress	Motion Picture	Character
2021/2022 (50th)	Awkwafina	Shang-Chi and the Legend of the Ten Rings	Katy Chen
2021/2022 (50th)	Carrie Coon	Ghostbusters: Afterlife	Callie Spengler
2021/2022 (50th)	Jodie Comer	Free Guy	Millie Rusk
2021/2022 (50th)	Viola Davis	The Suicide Squad	Amanda Waller
2021/2022 (50th)	Stephanie Hsu	Everything Everywhere All at Once	Joy Wang / Jobu Tupaki
2021/2022 (50th)	Diana Rigg (posthumously)	Last Night in Soho	Mrs. Collins
2021/2022 (50th)	Marisa Tomei	Spider-Man: No Way Home	May Parker
2022/2023 (51st)	Emily Blunt	Oppenheimer	Katherine 'Kitty' Oppenheimer
2022/2023 (51st)	Angela Bassett	Black Panther: Wakanda Forever	Queen Ramonda
2022/2023 (51st)	Jane Curtin	Jules	Joyce
2022/2023 (51st)	Melissa McCarthy	The Little Mermaid	Ursula
2022/2023 (51st)	Phoebe Waller-Bridge	Indiana Jones and the Dial of Destiny	Helena Shaw
2022/2023 (51st)	Sophie Wilde	Talk to Me	Mia
2023/2024 (52nd)	Rebecca Ferguson	Dune: Part Two	Lady Jessica
2023/2024 (52nd)	Emma Corrin	Deadpool & Wolverine	Cassandra Nova
2023/2024 (52nd)	Barbara Hershey	Strange Darling	Genevieve
2023/2024 (52nd)	Juliette Lewis	The Thicket	Cut Throat Bill
2023/2024 (52nd)	Margaret Qualley	The Substance	Sue
2023/2024 (52nd)	Cailee Spaeny	Alien: Romulus	Marie "Rain" Carradine
2023/2024 (52nd)	Zendaya	Dune: Part Two	Chani
2024/2025 (53rd)	Sigourney Weaver	Dust Bunny	Laverne
2024/2025 (53rd)	Oona Chaplin	Avatar: Fire and Ash	Varang
2024/2025 (53rd)	Mia Goth	Frankenstein	Elizabeth Harlander
2024/2025 (53rd)	Ariana Grande	Wicked: For Good	Glinda
2024/2025 (53rd)	Amy Madigan	Weapons	Gladys
2024/2025 (53rd)	Florence Pugh	Thunderbolts*	Yelena Belova
2024/2025 (53rd)	Hailee Steinfeld	Sinners	Mary

== Multiple nominations ==
5 nominations

- Scarlett Johansson

3 nominations

- Joan Allen
- Grace Jones
- Evangeline Lilly
- Rene Russo
- Frances Sternhagen
- Charlize Theron

2 nominations

- Kirstie Alley
- Ana de Armas
- Kim Basinger
- Halle Berry
- Emily Blunt
- Veronica Cartwright
- Jessica Chastain
- Joan Cusack
- Judi Dench
- Cameron Diaz
- Carrie Fisher
- Whoopi Goldberg
- Anne Hathaway
- Nicole Kidman
- Keira Knightley
- Diane Kruger
- Lucy Liu
- Helen Mirren
- Anne Ramsey
- Zelda Rubinstein
- Maggie Smith
- Sissy Spacek
- Hailee Steinfeld
- Meryl Streep
- Tilda Swinton
- Emily Watson
- Sigourney Weaver
- Robin Wright
- Juliette Lewis
- Zendaya

== Multiple wins ==
2 wins

- Emily Blunt
- Anne Ramsey
- Tilda Swinton
- Sigourney Weaver
