= The Secret Diary of Sigmund Freud =

1984 film

- Directed by: Danford B. Greene
- Written by: Linsa Howard; Roberto Mitrotti
- Produced by: Milos Antic; Wendy Hyland; Peer J. Oppenheimer
- Starring: Bud Cort; Carol Kane; Klaus Kinski
- Cinematography: Djordje Nikolic
- Edited by: Frank Mazzola
- Music by: Vojkan Borisavljevic
- Distributed by: 20th Century Fox
- Release date: 1984
- Running time: 90 minutes
- Country: United States
- Language: English

The Secret Diary of Sigmund Freud is a 1984 American comedy film directed by Danford B. Greene and starring Bud Cort.

== Cast ==
- Bud Cort as Sigmund Freud
- Carol Kane as Martha Bernays
- Klaus Kinski as Dr. Max Bauer
- Marisa Berenson as Emma Herrmann
- Carroll Baker as Mama Freud
- Ferdy Mayne as Herr Herrmann
- Dick Shawn as The Ultimate Patient
- Nikola Simic as Papa Freud
- Rade Marković as Dr. Schtupmann
- Stevo Žigon as Professor Eberhardt
- Borivoje Stojanović as Professor Von Schmertz
- Janez Vrhovec as Professor Gruber
