= Deadhead Miles =

1972 film by Vernon Zimmerman

- Theatrical release poster
- Directed by: Vernon Zimmerman
- Written by: Terrence Malick
- Produced by: Tony Bill
- Starring: Alan Arkin; Paul Benedict
- Cinematography: Ralph Woolsey
- Edited by: Danford B. Greene; Bud S. Smith
- Music by: Tom T. Hall
- Production companies: Biplane Cinematograph; Pangloss Productions
- Distributed by: Paramount Pictures
- Release date: May 25, 1973
- Running time: 93 minutes
- Country: United States
- Language: English
- Budget: under $1 million

Deadhead Miles is a 1972 American absurdist comedy road film directed by Vernon Zimmerman, written by Terrence Malick, and stars Alan Arkin as Cooper, a hillbilly drifter who takes a Peterbilt semi-truck with stolen goods on a long haul cross-country trip along with an unnamed English hitchhiker (Paul Benedict).

The film was shot entirely on location in and around the cities of Knoxville and Nashville in Tennessee, Madrid and Santa Fe in New Mexico, and Chino and Sacramento in California around late 1970 to early 1971.

== Plot ==
Cooper and Durazno knock out a truck driver and steal his rig. They take it back to a shop where it is repainted and the numbers are filed. In it they find a truckload of carburetors. Cooper abandons Durazno at a gas station and sets out as an independent driver of the yellow Peterbilt.

Cooper picks up a hitchhiker but refuses to also give a ride to the man's accompanying woman and dog. At a diner, the two notice the Duke of Interstate 40 eating at another table. Cooper asks him about his rig, which annoys the Duke. Cooper and the hitchhiker watch Samson and Delilah at a drive-in as Cooper discusses professions he's considered as a means to make money and how he reads the almanac so that he can be learning and earning money at the same time.

Cooper visits a shopkeeper and attempts to earn money by either selling some of the stolen carburetors or hustling work as an independent hauler but is turned down because the shopkeeper works with the wholesalers. The hitchhiker finds several prospective customers in the meantime and they pack the already-full truck with tiles and live chickens to be hauled, stealing food and supplies from other trucks. They visit the place where Cooper says his wife lives but she is not there. They are pulled over by a policeman and Cooper lies that he recently returned from the war to get the officer to let him go quickly without checking the contents of the truck. During the night, Cooper takes Benzedrine to stay awake while driving.

The next day, Cooper and the hitchhiker are once again stopped by the police and forced to show the logbook, which is not up to date. The police also note that the plates are not Cooper's and the trailer is over its stated weight. In exchange for not charging him, the police convince Cooper to leave four tons of his goods on the shoulder for them. Cooper quickly dumps some of the goods and tells the hitchhiker to close the door but the hitchhiker fails to secure the door and most of the tiles and live chickens pour out of the back and onto the highway.

Just as Cooper feels that he is getting into it, the truck breaks down. Cooper leaves to find parts while the hitchhiker stays with the truck in the heat. Johnny Mesquitero appears and gives him advice on how to handle the truck. He promises to fix the truck if they do not push it too hard. He fixes the piston seals and tells the hitchhiker to take 10 pounds of pressure out of the tires so that they do not jackknife, then he leaves. When Cooper returns the hitchhiker tells him about Johnny's visit and Cooper tells the hitchhiker that Johnny Mesquitero died six years earlier in a jackknife accident.

Cooper and the hitchhiker stop at a cafe where Cooper's friend the cook tells him that the police have been looking for him. That night Cooper steals the plates and papers from another truck to disguise his. They have to pass a weighbridge where Cooper convinces the police that a drunk hunter is shooting people on the hill. Two of the police leave to investigate and Cooper knocks the remaining one out with a glass bottle so that they can continue driving. Further ahead the road is closed for construction but Cooper insists that they can still use one of the lanes.

Cooper and the hitchhiker stop at a racetrack where the hitchhiker asks Cooper for some money but Cooper refuses to share. Later as they are riding again, the hitchhiker points a flare gun at Cooper and demands the goods in the truck. Cooper climbs into the back and when the hitchhiker follows Cooper knocks him out and locks him in. On his fourth night without sleep, Cooper forces an oncoming car off the road when he dozes off and veers into the oncoming lane. Cooper arrives at a barn, where he unhitches and unlocks the trailer. The hitchhiker climbs out and angrily chases after him but Cooper drives off and leaves him. Further down the road Cooper attempts to sell the tractor to a man for $200. The man refuses and Cooper abandons the truck in the parking lot, continuing his journey as a hitchhiker.

== Cast ==
- Alan Arkin as Cooper
- Paul Benedict as Hitchhiker
- Hector Elizondo as Duke
- Oliver Clark as Durazno
- Bruce Bennett as Johnny Mesquitero
- William Duell as Auto Parts Salesman
- Charles Durning as Truck Driver in Cafe
- Virgil Frye as Trouble Maker
- Donna Anderson as Waitress
- Richard Kiel as Big Dick
- Avery Schreiber as Boss Fulano
- John Milius and Phillip Kenneally as State Troopers
- Loretta Swit as Lady With Glass Eye
- George Raft and Ida Lupino as Diner Customers

== Release ==
Based on a significant amount of the filming taking place in Tennessee, the movie received a sneak preview in Nashville on January 28, 1972. Due to the underwhelming reception, and the lack of interest by studio executive Frank Yablans, Paramount only opened the movie in Nashville over a year later, on May 25, 1973, stressing the local filming in their advertising, leading to a longstanding belief that the film was never theatrically released.

In the summer of 1976, during a period where CB radios and truck driver culture was in fashion, Paramount attempted a rerelease with a new ad campaign. It was tested in Omaha, Nebraska, opening on August 18, 1976. It received a poor review, and no further playdates occurred after.

== See also ==
- List of American films of 1973
