= Brewster McCloud =

1970 US experimental comedy film by Robert Altman

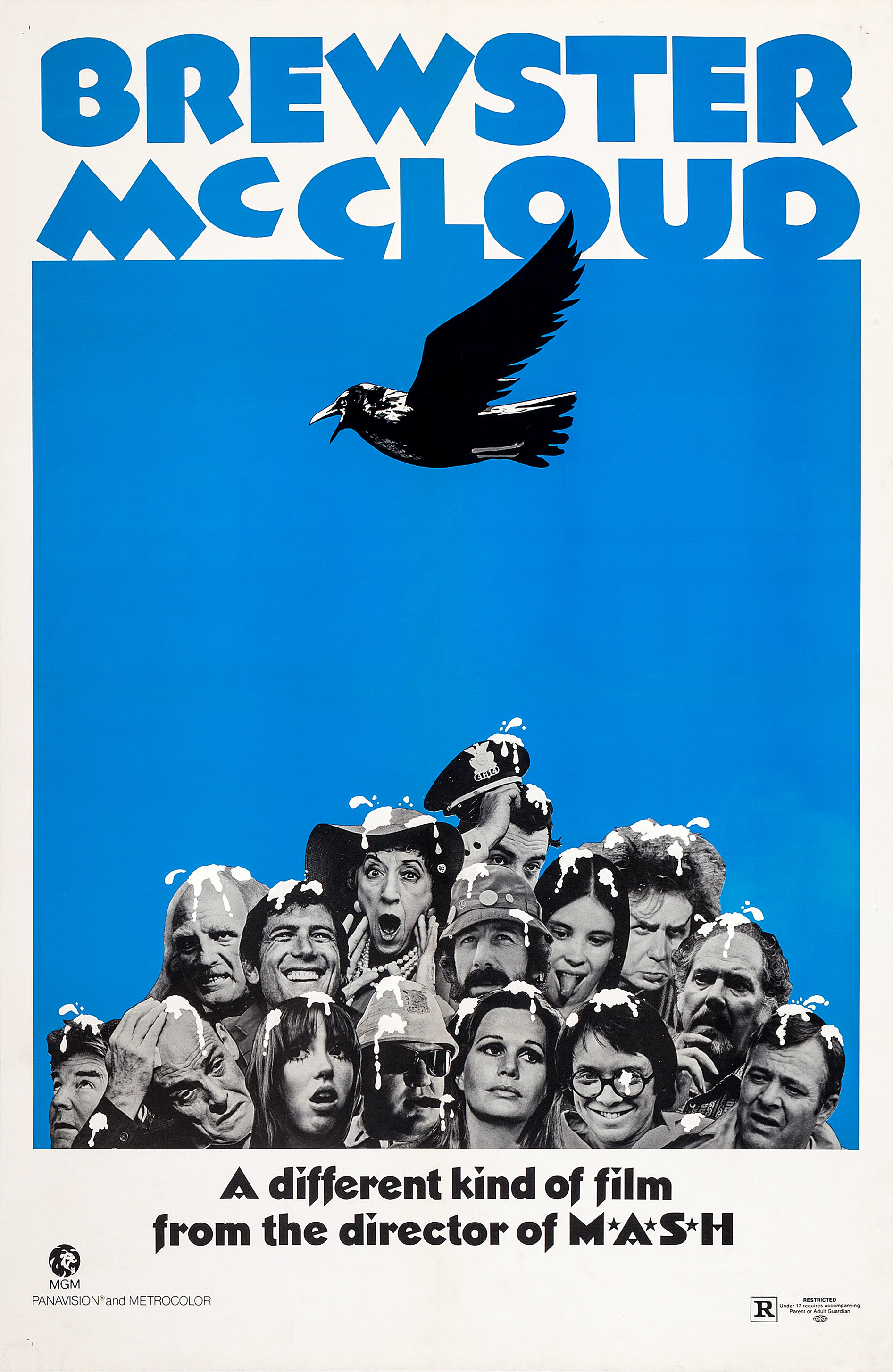
- Theatrical release poster
- Directed by: Robert Altman
- Written by: Doran William Cannon
- Produced by: Lou Adler; John Phillips
- Starring: Bud Cort; Sally Kellerman; Michael Murphy; Shelley Duvall; William Windom; René Auberjonois
- Cinematography: Lamar Boren; Jordan Cronenweth
- Edited by: Lou Lombardo
- Music by: Gene Page
- Production company: Lion's Gate Films
- Distributed by: Metro-Goldwyn-Mayer
- Release date: December 5, 1970
- Running time: 105 minutes
- Language: English
- Box office: $1.3 million (rentals)

Brewster McCloud is a 1970 American black comedy film directed by Robert Altman, and starring Bud Cort, Sally Kellerman, Michael Murphy, Shelley Duvall, William Windom, and René Auberjonois.

The film follows a young recluse named Brewster McCloud (Cort) who lives in a fallout shelter under the Houston Astrodome, where he is building a pair of wings in order to fly. He soon becomes a chief suspect in a series of bird-related murders.

Theatrically released by Metro-Goldwyn-Mayer on December 5, 1970, Brewster McCloud bombed upon its release and received mixed reviews from critics, but has since received more positive reviews in retrospect.

== Plot ==
The film opens with the usual MGM logo, but with a voice-over by René Auberjonois saying "I forgot the opening line" instead of the lion's roar. As the opening credits roll, wealthy Houstonian Daphne Heap begins to sing "The Star-Spangled Banner" on the field of the Astrodome, but stops the band, insisting that it's off-key. The band and Daphne start again, while the credits begin again as well. Daphne, who has been off-key herself, insists that this take is much better, but she is surrounded by the young black band members as we hear Merry Clayton singing an upbeat version of "Lift Every Voice and Sing." All this time, a woman in a trench coat has been watching from the stands. As the credits end, we see Brewster in an Astrodome fallout shelter, where a pet raven defecates on a newspaper headline about a speech by then–Vice President Spiro Agnew. Scenes are interspersed throughout the film of a lecturer who regales an audience including an enthusiastic young woman with a wealth of knowledge of the habits of birds, as he becomes increasingly bird-like himself.

Owlish Brewster lives hidden and alone under the Houston Astrodome and dreams of creating wings that will help him fly like a bird. His only assistance comes from Louise, a beautiful woman who wants to help. Wearing only a trench coat, Louise has unexplained scars on her shoulder blades, suggestive of a fallen angel. She warns Brewster against having sexual intercourse, as it could kill his instinct to fly.

While Brewster works to complete his wings and condition himself for flight, Houston suffers a string of unexplained murders, the work of a serial killer whose victims are found strangled and covered in bird droppings. The victims are all authoritarian or overtly racist figures, including Daphne Heap and the aged, wealthy and vicious landlord Abraham Wright. Haskell Weeks, a prominent figure in Houston, pulls strings to have the Houston police call "San Francisco super cop" Frank Shaft to investigate. Shaft immediately fixates on the bird droppings and soon finds a link to Brewster. Brewster eludes the police with the apparent help of Louise, but he eventually drives her away — and dooms himself — when he ignores her advice about sex by hooking up with Astrodome tour guide Suzanne Davis. Suzanne saves Brewster by evading Shaft in her stolen Road Runner. Severely injured after losing Brewster, Frank kills himself. Brewster eventually confesses his responsibility for the killings to Suzanne, who betrays him to the police.

A small army of Houston policemen enters the Astrodome but fails to nab Brewster before he takes flight using his completed wings. However, as a human, he cannot overcome his inherent unsuitability for flight. Exhausted by the effort, he falls out of the air, crashing in a heap on the floor of the Astrodome. The film finishes with a circus entering the Astrodome, played by the cast of the film costumed as clowns, strongmen and other circus performers. The ringmaster announces the names of each cast member, finishing with Brewster, who remains crumpled on the floor.

== Cast ==
- Bud Cort as Brewster McCloud
- Sally Kellerman as Louise
- Michael Murphy as Det. Lt. Frank Shaft
- William Windom as Haskell Weeks
- Shelley Duvall as Suzanne Davis
- René Auberjonois as The Lecturer
- Margaret Hamilton as Daphne Heap
- Corey Fischer as Officer Hines
- Stacy Keach as Abraham Wright
- John Schuck as Officer Johnson
- Bill Adair as Detective
- Bert Remsen as Officer Breen
- Jennifer Salt as Hope
- G. Wood as Captain Crandall
- Dean Goss as Officer Ledbetter
- William Baldwin as Bernard
- Ronnie Cammick as Wendel
- Marilyn Burns as Tour Guide

== Cultural references ==
Scenes and characters often allude to other films, some of which include the following:

- Hamilton's best-known role was as the Wicked Witch of the West in the 1939 film version of The Wizard of Oz. When Daphne is killed, she is wearing sparkling red shoes like those that the Witch wants to take from Dorothy, and a few bars of the film's most famous song, "Somewhere Over the Rainbow" are heard.
- During the final credit scene, Hope is wearing a blue-and-white gingham dress similar to Dorothy's in The Wizard of Oz and carrying a dog that looks like Dorothy's Toto from the film.
- Frank Shaft wears only turtleneck sweaters and has blue eyes (from contact lenses) to make him look like American actor Steve McQueen in the action cop movie Bullitt (1968).
- Haskell Weeks' name resembles that of Haskell Wexler, a cinematographer whom Altman admired and with whom he considered working on California Split (1974).
- Suzanne's apartment features a poster for Altman's previous film, M*A*S*H (1970).
- Sally Kellerman's character briefly romps in a fountain, recalling both her nude scene in M*A*S*H and the fountain scene in Federico Fellini's La Dolce Vita (1960).
- The circus parade during the closing credit scene of the film is reminiscent of the finale of Fellini's film 8½ (1963).

== Production ==
This film marks the first feature produced by Altman's Lion's Gate Films. It was produced in association with Lou Adler-John Phillips Productions. Adler was from the music business and had previously produced the recordings of The Mamas & the Papas. John Phillips from The Mamas & the Papas co-produced the film and wrote the songs. The film was originally called Brewster McCloud's (Sexy) Flying Machine.

The film was shot on location in Houston, Texas for eight weeks from May 22 to July 15, 1970. The original story was set in New York City but it was decided to set the film in Houston. During the opening credits, shots of the downtown Houston skyline (with One Shell Plaza under construction) zoom toward the Houston Astrodome and Astrohall, with the emerging Texas Medical Center in the background. It was the first film shot inside the Astrodome. The film records landmarks and streetscapes that later were demolished or significantly changed. For instance, the hotel where Frank Shaft stays was once part of the Astrodome complex, and has undergone several significant changes since the making of the film.

Although Doran William Cannon is given credit for the screenplay, most of the film was rewritten by Altman and close associates or improvised during filming. After the film's release, Cannon wrote a column for The New York Times detailing the frustrations of his experience.

Discovered in Texas, Shelley Duvall was cast in her first film role as Brewster's love interest Suzanne. She later co-starred in several of Altman's other films as well as playing memorable characters in films by other directors.

== Release ==
The film's premiere was at the Houston Astrodome on December 5, 1970. An audience of 35,000 was anticipated.

== Reception ==
Critical reviews were mixed upon the film's original release, but have grown more positive over time. Brewster McCloud has a score of 87% on Rotten Tomatoes based on 23 reviews, with an average grade of 7.3 out of 10. Metacritic, which uses a weighted average, assigned the film a score of 72 out of 100, based on 12 critics, indicating "generally favorable" reviews.

Roger Ebert of the Chicago Sun-Times gave the film three and a half stars out of four and, comparing it to M*A*S*H, wrote that it was "... just as densely packed with words and action, and you keep thinking you're missing things. You probably are. It's that quality that's so attractive about these two Altman films. We get the sense of a live intelligence, rushing things ahead on the screen, not worrying whether we'll understand."

Gene Siskel of the Chicago Tribune awarded three out of four stars and wrote, "Once again Altman has taken a story (this time a rather weak one) and given it a distinctive spirit and flavor thru casting, cinematic devices and odd juxtapositions. An Altman film, if two can make a genre, appears to be more of a mood than a story. This rarely works, but it does for him."

Variety called the film "a sardonic fairy tale for the times. Extremely well cast and directed, Lou Adler's made-in-Houston production demands an intellectual audience which is satisfied with smiles instead of belly-laughs."

Vincent Canby of The New York Times wrote that the film "... has more characters and incidents than a comic strip, but never enough wit to sustain more than a few isolated sequences."

Charles Champlin of the Los Angeles Times believed that the film was "not in a class" with M*A*S*H, but opined that "I doubt that the new year will give us a more startling, bizarre and rowdy piece of business."

John Simon wrote, "Brewster McCloud is a pretentious, disorganized, modishly iconoclastic movie which, in the manner of its Icarus-like hero, aspires to fly high and merely drops dead."

Stanley Kauffmann of The New Republic wrote, "A fairly promising comedy-fantasy is bumbled because the script idea lacks theme and clarity and point and the cast the ability to battle poor material".

In his 2022 book Cinema Speculation, Quentin Tarantino described his strong disliking of Brewster McCloud, describing it as "one of the worst movies to ever carry a studio logo, and that’s fully acknowledging Altman also made Quintet for a studio as well", and called the film "the cinematic equivalent of a bird shitting on your head."

Filmink magazine wrote "it would be hard to find a movie more utterly New Hollywood... the fact that it starred someone who looked like Bud Cort, for instance, or introduced someone like Shelley Duvall, or that the producer was record magnate Lou Adler... or that the original screenwriter... also wrote Skidoo. Even the fact that it was financed by MGM during its peak flop phase, where it kept changing owners and managers, ultimately winding up under James Aubrey."
