= Brave New World (1980 film) =

1980 film by Burt Brinckerhoff

- Home video cover art
- Genre: Drama; Science fiction
- Written by: Aldous Huxley; Robert E. Thompson; Doran William Cannon
- Directed by: Burt Brinckerhoff
- Starring: Keir Dullea; Marcia Strassman; Kristoffer Tabori; Bud Cort; Julie Cobb; Ron O'Neal
- Theme music composer: Paul Chihara
- Country of origin: United States
- Original language: English

Production
- Executive producer: Milton Sperling
- Producer: Jacqueline Babbin
- Cinematography: Harry L. Wolf
- Editor: James T. Heckert
- Running time: 180 minutes
- Production company: Universal Television

Original release
- Network: NBC
- Release: March 7, 1980

Brave New World is an American television film first shown in 1980. It was also shown on the BBC that same year, and is an adaptation of the 1932 novel of the same name by Aldous Huxley.

== Plot ==
In the future, pregnancy is outlawed, and citizens are required to engage in loveless sex, and narcotics are used to ensure happiness in the population. Babies are created in the lab, and every child's future is predestined into one of five classes.

While most people are happy to retain this established order, including Thomas Grahmbell, a supervisor of human "hatcheries," resistance is growing, as evidenced by quirky malcontent Bernard Marx and other rebels.

Bernard and his girlfriend Lenina Disney go to a primitive reservation which holds to 20th century values, and while there meet a native named John (also called the Savage). They return with him to civilization, and his presence further upends conventional thinking. John is seen as a freak and this grants him some degree of celebrity. John develops romantic feelings for Lenina, which are considered highly inappropriate, bordering on the obscene.

John's parents are from the more technologically advanced part of the world, and he has educated himself using often banned works such as Shakespeare. John realizes that his sexual mores, based on the works he studied, are antiquated in this advanced society. He therefore asks to be assigned a solitary posting, but even as he mans the lighthouse alone, he cannot escape his memories of Lenina.

== Cast ==
- Kristoffer Tabori as John the Savage
- Bud Cort as Bernard Marx
- Keir Dullea as Thomas "Tomakin" Grahmbell
- Julie Cobb as Linda Lysenko
- Ron O'Neal as Mustapha Mond
- Marcia Strassman as Lenina Disney (Crowne)
- Dick Anthony Williams as Helmholtz Watson
- Jonelle Allen as Fanny Crowne
- Jeanetta Arnette as Dwightina
- Casey Biggs as Beta lighthouse guard
- Reb Brown as Henry
- Tara Buckman as Alpha teacher
- Nigel Bullard as plant manager
- Shane Butterworth as John as a child
- Lee Chamberlin as head nurse
- Beatrice Colen as Gamma female
- Patrick Cronin as Gamma male
- Valerie Curtin as Chief Warden Stelina Shell
- Murray Salem as chief engineer
- Marneen Fields as futuristic factory worker
- Aron Kincaid as J. Edgar Millhouse
- Carole Mallory as Miss Trotsky
- Tricia O'Neil as Maoina Krupps
- Victoria Racimo as Beta teacher
- Delia Salvi as high priestess

== Production ==
Originally 4 hours long, it was cut down to three hours before being televised. Brave New World was directed by Burt Brinckerhoff for Universal Television and first shown on NBC on 7 March 1980. The screen adaptation was written by Doran William Cannon. It was filmed in Universal City, California.

== Awards and nominations ==
Year	Award	Category	Nominee(s)	Result	Ref.
1980	32nd Primetime Creative Arts Emmy Awards	Outstanding Art Direction for a Limited Series or a Special	Tom H. John; Mary Ann Biddle	Nominated	
1980	32nd Primetime Creative Arts Emmy Awards	Outstanding Cinematography for a Limited Series or a Special	Harry L. Wolf	Nominated	

== Reception ==
TCM found the film ambitious but tedious, confusing and ultimately unsuccessful.

== Home media ==
The film has no official DVD release, though a transfer from a recorded tape to DVD can be found.

== See also ==
- Brave New World (1998 film)
- Brave New World (2020 TV series)
