= The Contract (2006 film) =

2006 film by Bruce Beresford

- Film poster
- Directed by: Bruce Beresford
- Written by: Stephen Katz; John Darrouzet; J.D. Zeik
- Produced by: Boaz Davidson; Randall Emmett; George Furla; Andreas Grosch; Avi Lerner; Danny Lerner; Andreas Schmid; Les Weldon
- Starring: Morgan Freeman; John Cusack; Jamie Anderson; Alice Krige; Megan Dodds; Bill Smitrovich; Ian Shaw; Ned Bellamy
- Cinematography: Dante Spinotti
- Edited by: Mark Warner
- Music by: Normand Corbeil
- Production companies: Millennium Films; Revelations Entertainment; Emmett/Furla Films; VIP Medienfonds
- Distributed by: First Look International
- Release dates: October 9, 2006 (Haifa); July 24, 2007 (United States)
- Running time: 97 minutes
- Countries: Bulgaria; United States
- Language: English
- Box office: $5.5 million

The Contract is a 2006 German-American action thriller film directed by Bruce Beresford and written by television writer Stephen Katz and John Darrouzet. The Contract stars Morgan Freeman as professional assassin Frank Carden and John Cusack as a teacher who gets entangled into his latest assignment during a camp trip with his son. Released direct to video in the United States and Europe, The Contract received little critical notice despite its high-profile cast.

== Plot ==
Frank Carden is a professional assassin who has been hired to kill a reclusive billionaire named Lydell Hammond Sr., a vocal opponent of stem cell research. Frank's plan goes awry when he gets injured in a car accident and ends up in the hospital. When the hospital staff see his gun, they're able to identify him and federal marshals are called to pick him up. Meanwhile, widower Ray Keene, an awkward high school gym teacher and ex-cop, decides to try to bond with his son Chris on a wilderness hike after catching him smoking marijuana.

Frank is being driven through that same wilderness by the marshals but his men stage an ambush which kills most of the marshals. The surviving marshal asks Ray to take the prisoner to the authorities before succumbing to his injuries. Ray and Chris have to get Frank out of the wilderness and hand him over to the authorities. Frank's men, highly skilled ex-military thugs, track them down to rescue Frank. The pursuit brings a couple, Sandra and Lochlan into the crossfire, which results in Lochlan being killed by Frank's men. In a tense standoff in a cabin in the woods, Two of Frank's men turn up and Ray agrees to let Frank go, but one of Frank's thugs bursts in and punches Chris. Ray panics and kills Chris' attacker while Sandra shoots the other.

The local police arrive and rescue Sandra and Ray, but Frank escapes with Chris as a hostage. Miles-- Frank's mission handler-- orders Davis-- Frank's recent recruit-- to kill Frank and Chris and frame Frank. She orders him to kill Ray in case Frank told him anything about his job. Ray, feeling defeated and resting at home, sees a televised news report describing Frank as "exterminating obstacles to progress," which reminds Ray of an earlier conversation and leads him to deduce Frank's intended target, Hammond Sr. Ray heads to the funeral of Hammond Jr. to intercept Frank, inadvertently saving Frank from Davis.

Frank gets the upper hand on Davis, killing him with his own sniper rifle. However, the battle forces Frank to miss his own window of opportunity to assassinate Hammond Sr. Frank, relenting, gives Ray a set of keys to the hotel room where Chris is being held, then disappears. Back in Washington, D.C., Frank confronts Miles and tells her he's aware of her role in ordering Davis to kill him and threatens to come after her if any harm comes to Ray's family.

Two weeks after the incident, Ray's begun to date Sandra. During a barbecue, a radio newsflash reports that Hammond Sr. has died in a "boating accident," and Ray recognizes that Frank has finished his contract killing.

== Cast ==
- Morgan Freeman as Frank Carden
- John Cusack as Ray Keene
- Jamie Anderson as Chris Keene
- Alice Krige as Miles
- Megan Dodds as Sandra
- Corey Johnson as Davis
- Jonathan Hyde as Turner
- Bill Smitrovich as Chief Ed Wainwright
- Ned Bellamy as Deputy Evans
- Anthony Warren as Royko
- Thomas Lockyer as Johnson
- Ian Shaw as Michaels
- Jonas Talkington as Paramedic
- Ryan Spike Dauner as Helicopter Pilot #1
- Mike Diamente as Agent Reyes
- Atanas Srebrev as Agent Rodriguez
- Maynard Eziashi as Agent Chuck Robbins

== Production ==
Director Bruce Beresford talks extensively about the production of the movie in his memoir Josh Hartnett Definitely Wants To do This... True Stories From A Life In The Screen Trade.

The film was shot almost exclusively in Bulgaria and the DSK Bank central headquarters served as one of the main sets.

The scenes on the large rock were filmed at the Zlatnite Mostove on the Vitosha Mountain by Sofia, the capital city of Bulgaria.

== Reception ==
The film received negative reviews. It has a 0% rating on Rotten Tomatoes from 6 critics who reviewed it. Leonard Maltin awarded the film two stars.
