= The Out-of-Towners =

The Out-of-Towners may refer to:

- The Out-of-Towners (1970 film), starring Jack Lemmon and Sandy Dennis
- The Out-of-Towners (1999 film), starring Goldie Hawn and Steve Martin
- The Out-of-Towners (album), a 2004 album by Standards Trio
- The Out-of-Towners (The A-Team), an episode of the American television series The A-Team
