= Bud Cort =

American actor (1948–2026)

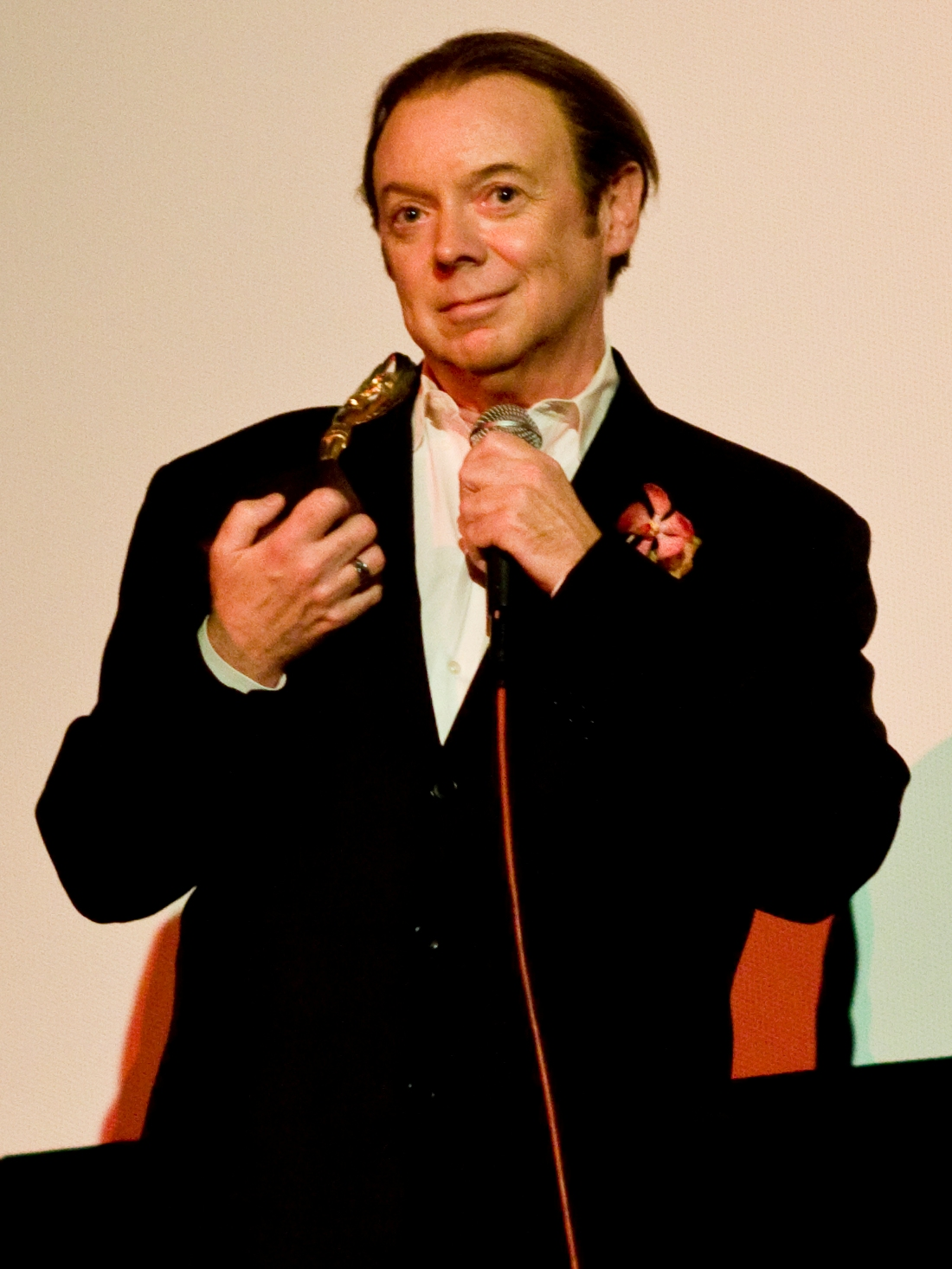
- Cort in 2008
- Born: Walter Edward Cox; March 29, 1948; Rye, New York, U.S.
- Died: February 11, 2026 (aged 77); Norwalk, Connecticut, U.S.
- Occupation: Actor
- Years active: 1967–2016

Walter Edward Cox (March 29, 1948 – February 11, 2026), known professionally as Bud Cort, was an American actor, known for his unorthodox starring roles in Robert Altman's Brewster McCloud (1970), for which he was nominated for a Golden Laurel Award, and Hal Ashby's Harold and Maude (1971), for which he was nominated for both a Golden Globe Award and a BAFTA Award. He also had supporting roles in films such as M*A*S*H (1970), Electric Dreams (1984), Heat (1995), Dogma (1999), Coyote Ugly (2000), Pollock (2000), and The Life Aquatic with Steve Zissou (2004).

Cort also voiced Toyman over the course of various series in the DC Animated Universe, including Superman: The Animated Series, Static Shock, and Justice League Unlimited.

== Early life ==
Walter Edward "Bud" Cox was born in Rye, New York, on March 29, 1948, to Joseph, an orchestra leader, and Alma, a publicist for Metro-Goldwyn-Mayer. He had a brother and three sisters. One of his nephews is Peter Berkman of the band Anamanaguchi.

Cort began taking acting lessons from William Hickey when he was 14. To avoid confusion with actor Wally Cox, he used his mother's maiden name as his stage surname, although he changed the original spelling of Court after Broadway's Cort Theatre. He attended Iona Preparatory School, where he frequently skipped classes to watch Broadway shows. After graduation, he attempted to attend acting classes at the New York University Tisch School of the Arts, but was rejected, as the classes were already full; he applied again with a portfolio of paintings and was instead accepted as a scenic art major.

== Career ==
Cort was discovered in a revue by director Robert Altman, who subsequently cast him in two of his movies in 1970, M*A*S*H and Brewster McCloud. In the latter, he played the title role. Cort went on to his best-known role as the suicide-obsessed Harold in Harold and Maude. Though it was not particularly successful on release, it gained international cult status and is now considered an American classic, ranking Number 69 on the American Film Institute's 100 Best Romantic Comedies.

In 1979, Cort nearly died in a car crash on the Hollywood Freeway where he collided with an abandoned car blocking a lane into which he was turning. He broke an arm and a leg and sustained a concussion and a fractured skull. His face was severely lacerated and his lower lip nearly severed. The crash resulted in plastic surgeries, substantial hospital bills, a lost court case, and the disruption of his career.

He subsequently returned as a character actor and appeared in a number of film, stage and TV roles: Endgame, Sledge Hammer!, The Chocolate War, The Big Empty, Theodore Rex, Dogma, But I'm a Cheerleader, Pollock, The Twilight Zone, The Secret Diary of Sigmund Freud, and The Life Aquatic with Steve Zissou.

Cort made a guest appearance on the November 8, 2007, episode of Ugly Betty as the priest officiating at Wilhelmina Slater's wedding. In 2010, he guest-starred on Criminal Minds in the episode "Mosley Lane" as the elderly paedophile Roger Roycewood. In 2012, Cort appeared as the artist Gleeko in the Eagleheart episode "Exit Wound the Gift Shop".

Cort's voiceover roles include Edgar the computer in the film Electric Dreams; Toyman over the course of various DC Animated Universe series including Superman: The Animated Series, Static Shock, and Justice League Unlimited; and Josiah Wormwood in an episode of the earlier DCAU production Batman: The Animated Series. He can also be heard as The King in the English-language version of the feature film The Little Prince (2015), which premiered at the 2015 Cannes Film Festival and won the César Award for Best Animated Film in February 2016. It was made available to American audiences through Netflix in 2016. This proved to be the actor's final film role.

== Personal life and death ==
Cort was never married and had no children. During the 1970s, he befriended Groucho Marx and lived at the comedian's guesthouse. At the time of his death, he was reported to be working on an autobiography.

He died of pneumonia at an assisted living facility in Norwalk, Connecticut, on February 11, 2026, at the age of 77.

== Filmography ==
=== Film ===
| Year | Film | Role | Notes |
|---|---|---|---|
| 1967 | Up the Down Staircase | Student | Uncredited |
| 1969 | Sweet Charity | Hippie | Uncredited |
| 1970 | M*A*S*H | Pvt. Lorenzo Boone | |
| 1970 | The Strawberry Statement | Elliot—Coxswain | |
| 1970 | The Traveling Executioner | Jimmy Croft | |
| 1970 | Brewster McCloud | Brewster McCloud | Nominated—Laurel Award for Male Star of Tomorrow |
| 1971 | Gas-s-s-s | Hooper | |
| 1971 | Harold and Maude | Harold Parker Chasen | Nominated—BAFTA Award for Most Promising Newcomer; Nominated—Golden Globe Award for Best Actor – Motion Picture Musical or Comedy |
| 1975 | Hallucination Strip | Massimo Monaldi | |
| 1977 | Why Shoot the Teacher? | Max Brown | |
| 1977 | Pumping Iron | Himself | Scenes deleted |
| 1978 | Son of Hitler | Willi Hitler | |
| 1980 | Die Laughing | Mueller | |
| 1981 | She Dances Alone | Director | |
| 1983 | Hysterical | Dr. John | |
| 1984 | The Secret Diary of Sigmund Freud | Sigmund Freud | |
| 1984 | Love Letters | Danny De Fronso | |
| 1984 | Electric Dreams | Edgar, the Computer (voice) | |
| 1984 | Maria's Lovers | Harvey | |
| 1986 | Telephone | Man | Short |
| 1986 | Invaders from Mars | Mark Weinstein | |
| 1988 | Love at Stake | Parson Babcock | |
| 1988 | The Chocolate War | Brother Jacques | |
| 1989 | Out of the Dark | Doug Stringer | |
| 1990 | Going Under | McNally | Uncredited |
| 1990 | Brain Dead | Jack Halsey | |
| 1991 | Ted & Venus | Ted Whitley | Also director and co-writer |
| 1995 | Girl in the Cadillac | Bud | |
| 1995 | Heat | Solenko, Restaurant Manager | Uncredited |
| 1996 | Theodore Rex | Spinner | |
| 1998 | I Woke Up Early the Day I Died | Shopkeeper | |
| 1998 | Sweet Jane | Dr. Geiler | |
| 1999 | Dogma | John Doe Jersey (aka God) | |
| 1999 | But I'm a Cheerleader | Peter Bloomfield | |
| 2000 | South of Heaven, West of Hell | Agent Otts | |
| 2000 | The Million Dollar Hotel | Shorty | |
| 2000 | Coyote Ugly | Romero | |
| 2000 | Pollock | Howard Putzel | |
| 2001 | Made | Bernardo, Gay House Owner | Uncredited |
| 2003 | The Big Empty | Neely | |
| 2004 | The Life Aquatic with Steve Zissou | Bill Ubell | Nominated—Broadcast Film Critics Association Award for Best Cast; Nominated—Boston Society of Film Critics Award for Best Ensemble Cast |
| 2007 | The Number 23 | Dr. Sirius Leary | Uncredited |
| 2014 | Dream Corps LLC | Carl Kwartz | |
| 2015 | The Little Prince | The King (voice) | Winner—Behind the Voice Actor Awards for Best Vocal Ensemble in a TV Special/Direct-to-DVD Title or Short |
| 2016 | Affections | | Short film (final acting role) |

=== Television ===
| Year | Film | Role | Notes |
|---|---|---|---|
| 1968 | The Doctors | Delivery Boy | Uncredited; Episodes: "1379", "1394" |
| 1969 | Room 222 | Jerry Shaffer | Episode: "Clothes Make the Boy" |
| 1969 | The Governor & J.J. | Marvin Harris | Episode: "Profile in Discourage" |
| 1969 | Mr. Deeds Goes to Town | Jeff | Episode: "The Education of Longfellow Deeds" |
| 1976 | Bernice Bobs Her Hair | Warren | Television film |
| 1980 | Brave New World | Bernard Marx | Television film |
| 1982 | Insight | Teddy | Episode: "Teddy" |
| 1982–1983 | Faerie Tale Theatre | The Page, The Musicmaster | Episodes: "The Nightingale", "Rumpelstiltskin" |
| 1985 | Tales of the Unexpected | Newt | Episode: "Nothin' Short of Highway Robbery" |
| 1985 | Tales from the Darkside | Abe North | Episode: "Snip, Snip" |
| 1987 | Bates Motel | Alex West | NBC television film |
| 1987 | The Hitchhiker | Wax | Episode: "Made for Each Other" |
| 1987 | Sledge Hammer! | Zeff Campbell | Episode: "Last of the Red Hot Vampires" |
| 1988 | The Twilight Zone | Willy Gardner | Episode: "The Trunk" |
| 1988 | Poison | Derek | 1 episode |
| 1989 | Midnight Caller | Gaddis | Episode: "No Exit" |
| 1992 | Batman: The Animated Series | Josiah Wormwood (voice) | Episode: "The Cape and Cowl Conspiracy" |
| 1992 | Bob | Malcolm Tibbets | Episode: "The Lost Episode" |
| 1992 | Dream On | Creepy Guy | Episode: "No Deposit, No Return" |
| 1992 | Carol Leifer: Gaudy, Bawdy and Blue | Himself | Television special |
| 1993 | And the Band Played On | Antique Shop Owner | Television film |
| 1993 | Jack's Place | Jules Philpott | Episode: "An Affair to Vaguely Remember" |
| 1995 | The Mask: Animated Series | Fritz Drizzle/Tempest (voice) | 2 episodes |
| 1995 | Crazy for a Kiss | Dr. Webb | BBC television film |
| 1996 | Superman: The Animated Series | Winslow Schott/Toyman (voice) | Episode: "Fun and Games" |
| 1997 | Gun | Lazy Eye Pete | Episode: "Ricochet" |
| 1997 | Jitters | Michael | Television movie |
| 1997 | AFI's 100 Years, 100 Laughs: America's Funniest Movies | Himself | TV special |
| 1998 | The Sylvester & Tweety Mysteries | Flint Northwood (voice) | Episode: "The Stilted Perch" |
| 1998 | Superman: The Animated Series | Winslow Schott/Toyman (voice) | Episode: "Obsession" |
| 2000 | The Roseanne Show | Himself | TV talk show |
| 2003 | Static Shock | Toyman (voice) | Episode: "Toys in the Hood" |
| 2006 | Justice League Unlimited | Toyman (voice) | Episode: "Alive!" |
| 2006 | Arrested Development | Himself | Episode: "Fakin' It" |
| 2007 | Ugly Betty | Priest | Episode: "A Nice Day for a Posh Wedding" |
| 2010 | Funny or Die Presents | Robert Rubbie | Episode: "Magical Balloon" |
| 2010 | Criminal Minds | Roger Roycewood | Episode: "Mosley Lane" |
| 2012 | Eagleheart | Gleeko | Episode: "Exit Wound the Gift Shop" |
