= Hilary Thompson =

American actress

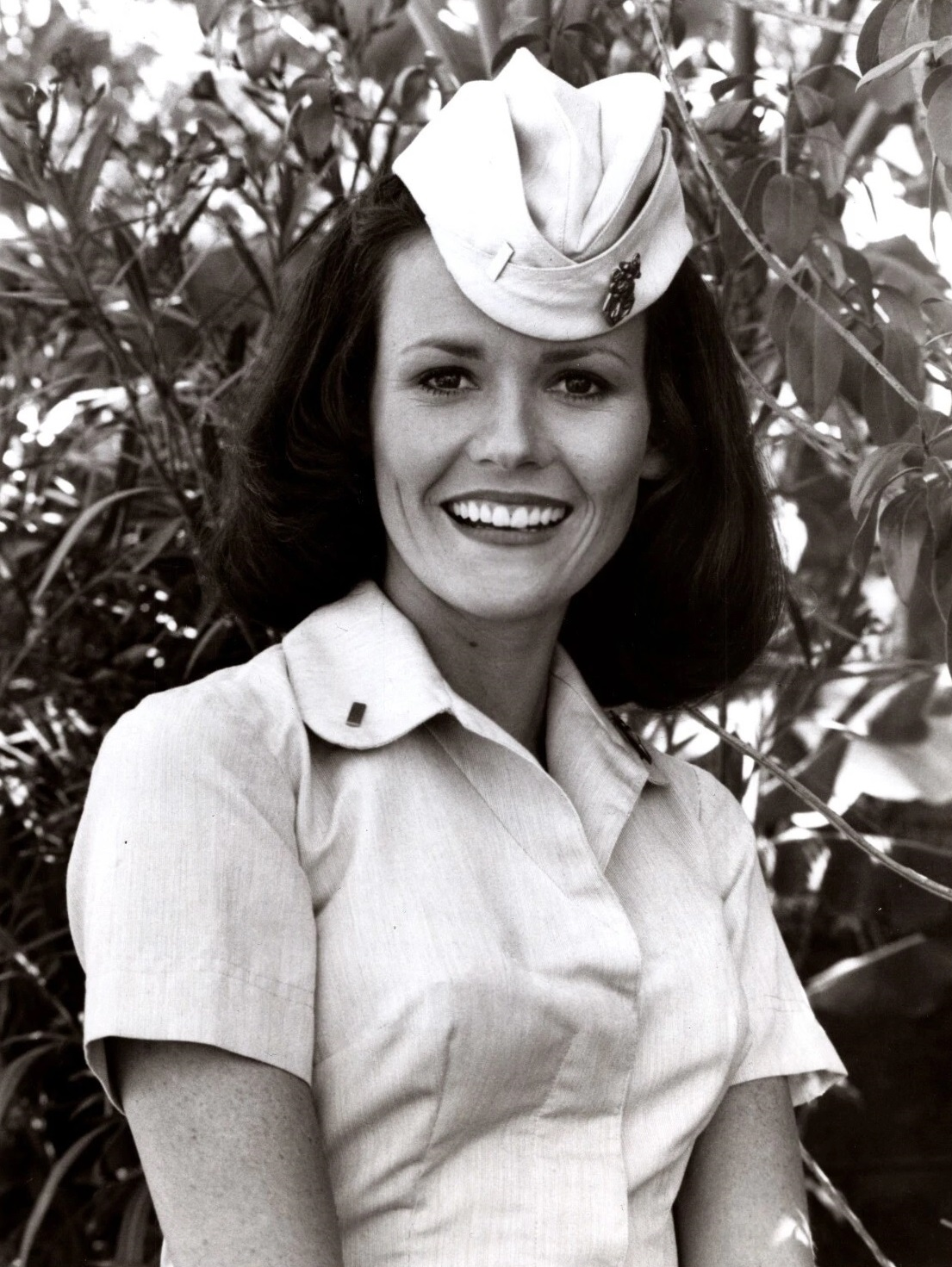
- Thompson in 1978
- Born: March 2, 1949 (age 77); Pontiac, Michigan, U.S.
- Other name: Hilarie Thompson
- Education: Hollywood High School
- Occupation: Actress
- Years active: 1967—1988
- Known for: The Fury; Nighthawks; If It's Tuesday, This Must Be Belgium

Hilary Thompson (born March 2, 1949), credited almost equally (23 of 49 credits) as Hilarie Thompson, is an American actress, known primarily for her character roles in popular television throughout the 1960s, 1970s, and 1980s.

== Early years ==
Thompson was born in St. Joseph's Hospital in Pontiac, Michigan. When she was 3 months old, the family moved to California, and she grew up there. Her performance in Hollywood High School's production of My Fair Lady when a talent scout was present led to her first film contract.

== Career ==
In 1966, Thompson made her television debut in a Kodak commercial aired during the Academy Awards.

On television, Thompson portrayed Lynn on Chico and the Man Lizabeth Barrett on The Manhunter, Lieutenant Betty Wheeler on Operation Petticoat, Sharon St. Clair on Number 96, Elizabeth Coates on The Young Rebels, and Ginger on Washingtoon. She also appeared on programs such as I Dream of Jeannie, Bewitched, Gunsmoke, The Flying Nun, Room 222, The Odd Couple, The Brady Bunch, Barnaby Jones, Harry O, Starsky and Hutch, Fantasy Island, Charlie’s Angels, ALF, and a number of movies, ranging from comedy to drama and suspense-thrillers.

== Filmography ==
=== Film ===
Year	Title	Role	Notes
1968	Maryjane	Hillarie	as Hilarie Thompson
1968	How Sweet It Is!	Bootsie	as Hilarie Thompson
1968	Where Angels Go, Trouble Follows	Hilarie	as Hilarie Thompson
1969	Model Shop	Girl Hippie	
1969	If It's Tuesday, This Must Be Belgium	Shelly Ferguson	as Hilarie Thompson
1970	Getting Straight	Cynthia	as Hilarie Thompson
1973	Hex	Oriole	as Hilarie Thompson
1974	The Manhunter	Lizabeth Barrett	
1978	The Fury	Cheryl	
1981	Nighthawks	Pam	as Hilarie Thompson

=== Television ===
Year	Title	Role	Notes
1966	Lassie	Teenage Mountain Girl (as Hilarie Thompson)	Episode: "Lassie the Voyager: Part 4"
1967	I Dream of Jeannie	1st Girl	Episode: "The Mod Party"
1968	I Dream of Jeannie	Suzie Schaeffer	Episode: "Jeannie, My Guru"
1969	Lassie	Patricia 'Walden' Prescott (as Hilarie Thompson)	Episode: "Walden"
1969	The Outcasts	Bonnie	Episode: "The Town That Wouldn't"
1969	Bewitched	Mrs. Palkowski	Episode: "Amd Something Makes Four"
1969	Gunsmoke	Rachel Clifford	Episode: "Hawk"
1970	The Flying Nun	Susan	Episode: "Operation Population"
1970-1971	The Young Rebels	Elizabeth Coates	15 episodes
1971	Matt Lincoln	Karen Lowell	Episode: "Karen"
1971	Room 222	Margaret Peters (as Hillary Thompson)	Episode: "I Hate You, Silas Marner"
1971	The Odd Couple	Martha	Episode: "Natural Childbirth"
1971	Love, American Style	Laurie (segment "Love and the Old Cowboy")	Episode: "Love and the Baby / Love and the Mother / Love and the Free Weekend / Love and the Jealous Husband / Love and the Old Cowboy"
1972	The F.B.I.	Susan Margold	Episode: "The Corruptor"
1972	A Great American Tragedy	Julie Wilkes	tv movie
1972	Insight	Shelly	Episode: "The Freak"
1973	Insight	Britt	Episode: "Roommates on a Rainy Day"
1973	Here We Go Again	Linda Jackson	Episode: "The Times They Are A-Changing"
1973	The Brady Bunch	Marge	Episode: "The Cincinnati Kids"
1974	Hec Ramsey	Betsy Alexander	Episode: "Scar Tissue"
1974	The Manhunter	Elizabeth Barrett	Episode: "Pilot"; Episode: "The Man Who Thought He Was Dillinger"; Episode: "Death on the Run"
1974	Harry O	Laura Silver	Episode: "Forty Reasons to Kill: Part 1"; Episode: "Forty Reasons to Kill: Part 2"
1975	Doctors' Hospital	Rita Hagen	Episode: "Point of Maximum Pressure"
1977	The Streets of San Francisco	Irene Lupoff	Episode: "Dead Lift"
1978	Barnaby Jones	Melissa Warren	Episode: "Nest Of Scorpions"
1978-1979	Operation Petticoat	Lt. Betty Wheeler	10 episodes
1979	Starsky & Hutch	Laura Anderson	Episode: "Targets without a Batch: Part 2"; Episode: "Targets without a Batch: Part 3"
1979	Charlie's Angels	Carol Brewster	Episode: "Counterfeit Angels"
1985	Washingtoon	Ginger Forehead	10 episodes
