= Stephen Katz (writer) =

American teacher and screenwriter

- Born: July 4, 1946 New York City, New York, United States
- Died: October 18, 2005 (aged 59) Plano, Texas, United States
- Occupation: Teacher; screenwriter; television writer
- Language: English
- Genre: Film; television; screenwriting

Stephen Katz (4 July 1946 – 18 October 2005) was an American teacher and screenwriter. Katz wrote several television episodes and three feature-length films during his career. Following a move to Plano, Texas, in 1993, Katz taught a communications class at Plano East Senior High School. He was married and had two children. He died of prostate cancer in 2005.

== Filmography ==
- The Contract (2006), writer
- Satan's Princess (1990), writer
- L.A. Law (1986), writer, episodes "New Kidney on the Block" and "God Rest Ye Little Gentleman"
- Hunter (1984), writer, episode "The Biggest Man in Town", story editor, episode "Night of the Dragons"
- The A-Team (1983), writer
- Knight Rider (1982), writer
- Hex (1973), writer
