= Fade to Black (1980 film) =

1980 film by Vernon Zimmerman

- Theatrical release poster
- Directed by: Vernon Zimmerman
- Written by: Vernon Zimmerman
- Produced by: George G. Braunstein; Ron Hamady
- Starring: Dennis Christopher; Tim Thomerson; Norman Burton; Morgan Paull; Gwynne Gilford; Eve Brent; James Luisi; Linda Kerridge; Mickey Rourke
- Cinematography: Álex Phillips Jr.
- Edited by: James Mitchell; Barbara Pokras
- Music by: Craig Safan
- Production company: Compass International
- Distributed by: Compass International; American Cinema Releasing
- Release date: October 17, 1980
- Running time: 102 minutes
- Country: United States
- Language: English
- Budget: $1.8 million
- Box office: $15 million

Fade to Black is a 1980 American psychological horror comedy slasher film written and directed by Vernon Zimmerman, and starring Dennis Christopher, Eve Brent, and Linda Kerridge. It also features Mickey Rourke and Peter Horton in minor roles. The plot follows shy and lonely cinephile Eric Binford who embarks on a killing spree against his oppressors while impersonating classic film characters.

== Plot ==
Eric Binford is a chain smoking, socially awkward and unlikeable young man who is an obsessed film addict. His love of old films extends far beyond his job at a Los Angeles film distributor's warehouse and endless late-night film screenings in his bedroom. For his vast knowledge, Eric has been bullied by his coworkers and family. His singular obsession eventually turns into psychosis after he crosses paths with Marilyn O'Connor, an Australian model and Marilyn Monroe lookalike who becomes the physical embodiment of his cinematic desires.

After Marilyn unintentionally stands up Eric on their first date, he becomes homicidally unbalanced, transforming himself into a gallery of classic film characters—including Dracula, The Mummy and Hopalong Cassidy—and sets out to destroy his oppressors, starting with his abusive and crotchety Aunt Stella, pushing her wheelchair down a staircase to her death (reenacting a scene from Kiss of Death (1947)) and making this look like an accident. Eric attends her funeral dressed as Tommy Udo (Richard Widmark's role from the aforementioned film).

Eric then dresses up as Dracula to attend a midnight screening of Night of the Living Dead (1968) at a local cinema. Afterwards, he bursts in on Marilyn in the shower while looking for an autograph in a scene straight out of Psycho (1960); he escapes and targets Dee Dee, a sex worker who had snubbed him earlier. She trips, impaling herself on a picket fence, and Eric licks her blood off his fingers.

Eric becomes more and more unhinged from reality and his antisocial behavior in public becomes more erratic and violent. A few nights later, Eric dresses up as the cowboy Hopalong Cassidy, when he shoots and kills Richie, a boorish co-worker who taunted him on a regular basis and beat him up after welching on a bet that Eric won. Not long after, Eric dresses up as The Mummy and drives his mean and vindictive boss, Marty Berger, into suffering a deadly heart attack while he is working late at night at his distribution warehouse.

Finally, Eric dresses up as gangster Cody Jarrett (from White Heat (1949)) and kills a sleazy filmmaker named Gary Bially, who stole his idea as his own for an upcoming feature film inspired by Ali Baba and the Forty Thieves (to be called Alabama and the Forty Thieves) at a barber shop in broad daylight, which finally gives away his identity. Eric then eventually works his way toward Marilyn, hoping to lure her to his side.

Investigating the murders is a criminal psychologist named Dr. Jerry Moriarty, who tries to find a pattern to the murders and find Eric, to help or stop him, with the assistance of Officer Anne Oshenbull, a friendly policewoman who has discovered that Eric's Aunt Stella is actually his mother who blames him for her ending up crippled. Moriarty's investigation is hampered by his own mean-spirited and nasty boss, Captain M. L. Gallagher, who tries to stop Moriarty's investigation because Gallagher wants to take all the credit of finding the killer for himself.

This all leads to Eric luring Marilyn to a photography studio where he drugs her to reenact a scene from The Prince and the Showgirl (1957) which is interrupted when Dr. Moriarty arrives, and Eric is forced to run with Marilyn at his side. This leads to the Mann's Chinese Theatre where the insane Eric is shot by the police on the roof of the building while reenacting Cody Jarrett's death scene in White Heat. Eric then falls off the roof to his apparent death on the pavement below.

== Cast ==
- Dennis Christopher as Eric Binford
- Tim Thomerson as Dr. Jerry Moriarty
- Gwynne Gilford as Officer Anne Oshenbull
- Norman Burton as Marty Berger
- Linda Kerridge as Marilyn O'Connor
- Morgan Paull as Gary Bially
- James Luisi as Captain M. L. Gallagher
- Eve Brent Ashe as Aunt Stella Binford
- John Steadman as Sam
- Marcie Barkin as Stacy
- Mickey Rourke as Richie
- Peter Horton as Joey
- Melinda O. Fee as Eve Christopher
- Hennen Chambers as Bart
- Anita Converse as Dee Dee

== Production ==
=== Development ===
A labor of love for director Vernon Zimmerman (who stated that it wasn't a horror film in an interview after its release), the film starred Dennis Christopher whose previous credits included the 1979 Academy Award-winning Breaking Away and Robert Altman's 1978 ensemble piece A Wedding. The film also co-starred Australian actress Linda Kerridge (for whom Yablans rewrote the screenplay after meeting her at a party one year prior) due to her likeness to Marilyn Monroe and who fell into obscurity afterwards.

=== Filming ===
Principal photography occurred in Los Angeles between February 1, 1980 and April 11, 1980. Many problems occurred during production which included the actress Gwynne Gilford being pregnant during production, and gave birth after it ended to future movie star Chris Pine.

== Release ==
Fade to Black opened theatrically in New York City on October 17, 1980, followed by a Halloween premiere in Los Angeles.

=== Lawsuits ===
In late December 1980, the U.S. Film Office of Northbrook, Illinois, and William Boyd Enterprises of Beverly Hills, California filed copyright infringement lawsuits against Fade to Black, alleging that the filmmakers did not properly authorize usage of film clips from the Hopalong Cassidy films. The lawsuit alleged that the portrayal of Hopalong Cassidy in the film portrayed Boyd and his titular character with "contempt and ridicule," and sought an injunction to remove the film from theaters.

=== Home media ===
The film was released on VHS on September 26, 1996, by Media Home Entertainment. It was first released on DVD on August 24, 1999, by Anchor Bay Entertainment. It was released on Blu-ray for the first time on November 27, 2020, by Vinegar Syndrome. Scream Factory released a 4K UHD Blu-ray edition on July 29, 2025.

== Reception ==
=== Box office ===
The film was commercially successful in its home country yet was even more popular in France. It grossed approximately $15 million worldwide.

=== Critical response ===
On the review aggregator website Rotten Tomatoes, 42% of 12 critics' reviews are positive. Metacritic, which uses a weighted average, assigned the film a score of 54 out of 100, based on 5 critics, indicating "mixed or average" reviews.

Roger Ebert from Chicago Sun Times awarded the film 3/4 stars, calling it "a weird, uneven, generally intriguing thriller" while Time Out wrote, "The film aspires to homage, it's true, but its references are altogether too obvious."

Author and film critic Leonard Maltin awarded the film 1.5 out of 4 stars, writing that the film was "[an] interesting idea ruined by excessive violence, [and] a poor performance by Christopher."

=== Accolades ===
The film was nominated for multiple Saturn Awards (Christopher for Best Actor, Zimmerman for Best Director and Best Horror Film), with Eve Brent winning for Best Supporting Actress at the 8th Saturn Awards. It also won the Bronze Mask at the Taormina Film Fest.

== Related works ==
A novelization of the film was written by Ron Renauld.

== Sources ==
- Maltin, Leonard (2013). Leonard Maltin's 2014 Movie Guide. New York City, New York: Penguin Publishing Group. ISBN 978-1-101-60955-2.
- Rockoff, Adam (2016) [2002]. Going to Pieces: The Rise and Fall of the Slasher Film, 1978-1986. Jefferson, North Carolina: McFarland & Company. ISBN 978-0-7864-9192-6.
