= Doran William Cannon =

American screenwriter

Doran William Cannon (1937–2005) was an American writer and producer for film and television.

== Early life ==
He was born in Toledo, Ohio, and graduated from Columbia College in 1959. While working on his MBA at Columbia University, which he received in 1962, he made his first film, Going Up.

== Career ==
Several years later he wrote, produced, and directed his first feature, The Square Root of Zero (1964). In 1965 he left New York City for Hollywood, where he wrote the original scripts for Otto Preminger's Skidoo (1968) and Robert Altman's Brewster McCloud (1970). The original story for the latter was set in New York City but it was decided to set the film in Houston. Although Cannon is credited for the screenplay, most of the film was rewritten by Altman and his close associates or improvised during filming. After the film's release, Cannon wrote a column for The New York Times detailing the frustrations of his experience. His career later shifted towards television, where Cannon wrote the screen adaptation of Brave New World. Originally 4 hours long, it was cut down to three hours before being televised. Brave New World was directed by Burt Brinckerhoff for Universal Television and first shown on NBC on 7 March 1980.

Cannon wrote Authorship: The Dynamic Principles of Writing Creatively, and taught creative writing.
