= Vernon Zimmerman =

American writer and director (1936–2023)

Vernon Lehr Zimmerman (August 30, 1936 – October 18, 2023) was an American writer and director who made his debut as director with the 1962 short Lemon Hearts starring Taylor Mead. He collaborated with Terrence Malick on the script to his directorial debut, the road movie, Deadhead Miles. Zimmerman wrote and directed the Claudia Jennings roller derby drive-in film Unholy Rollers. He was most well known for his horror slasher film Fade to Black, a dark and despairing psychological study of Eric Binford (Dennis Christopher), an awkward and alienated hardcore film buff who exacts a harsh revenge on his cruel tormentors.

Zimmerman received a nomination for the Saturn Award for Best Director for the film at the 8th Saturn Awards, a predecessor to more well-known modern parodies of the horror genre. Vernon also wrote the scripts for the horror-Western Hex (a.k.a. Charmed), the redneck crime exploitation film Bobbie Jo and the Outlaw, the made-for-TV wrestling comedy/drama Mad Bull, the failed TV pilot film Shooting Stars, and the teen fantasy comedy Teen Witch. Zimmerman's last film was the six-minute comic short Chuck and Wally on the Road.

Zimmerman also worked as a script analyst, taught screen-writing courses at UCLA's Extension and Certificate Program, and taught classes on both writing feature scripts and directing actors for film and television at the USC School of Cinema and Television. Vernon Zimmerman lived in Los Angeles and was a member of both the Writers Guild of America and the Directors Guild of America.

Zimmerman died on October 18, 2023, at the age of 87.

== Filmography ==
- To L.A. with Lust (short) (1961)
- Lemon Hearts (short) (1962)
- The College (documentary) (1964)
- Deadhead Miles (1972) also writer
- Unholy Rollers (1972) also writer
- Hex (1973) writer only
- Bobbie Jo and the Outlaw (1976) writer only
- Mad Bull (TV movie) (1977) writer only
- Fade to Black (1980) also writer
- Shooting Stars (TV film) (1983) writer only
- Teen Witch (1989) writer only
- Chuck and Wally on the Road (short) (1995)
