= Linda Kerridge =

Australian former actress and model (born 1954)

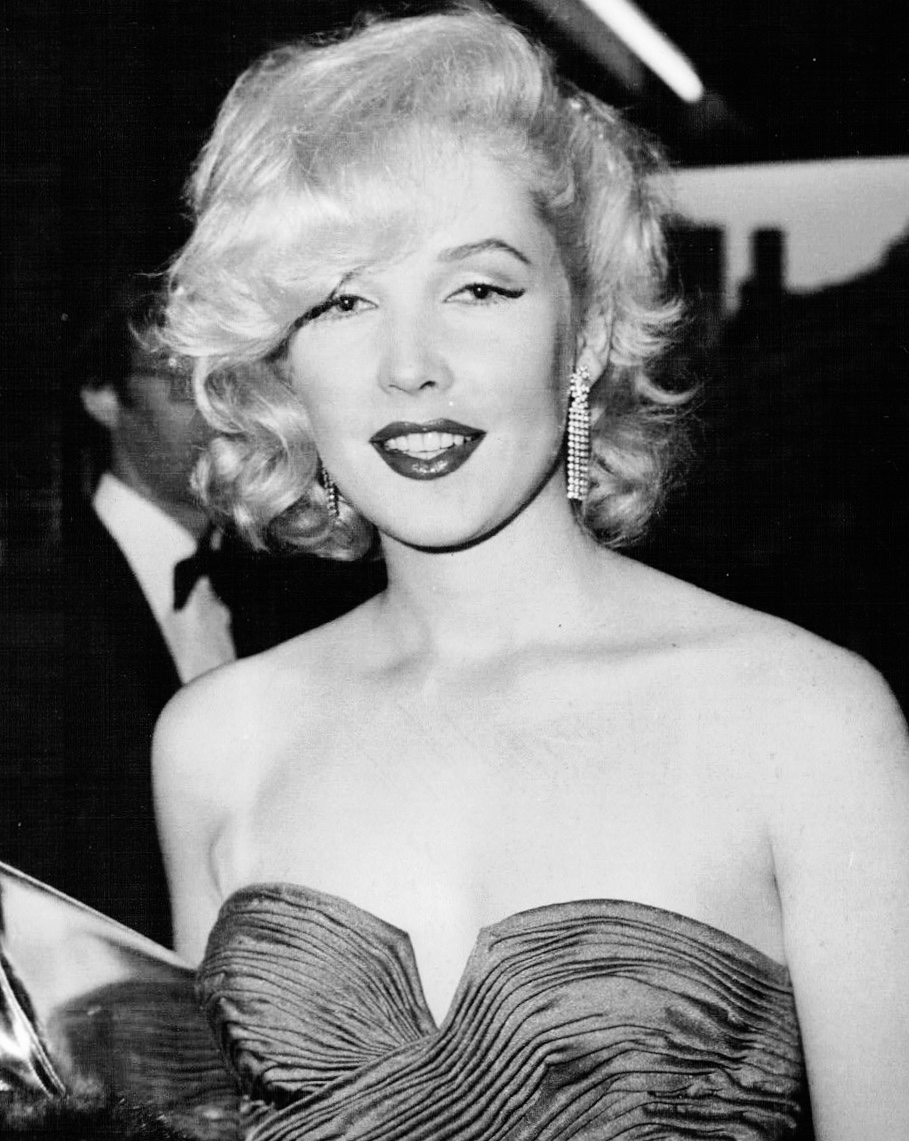
- Kerridge in 1982
- Born: 18 November 1954 (age 71); Wagga Wagga, New South Wales, Australia
- Occupations: Actress; model
- Years active: 1974–1988
- Spouse: Corey Parker (m. 1989–1992)

Linda Kerridge (born 18 November 1954) is an Australian former actress and model. She rose to fame for her impersonations of Marilyn Monroe. Her remarkable resemblance to the late actress led to her casting in the horror film Fade to Black (1980), in which she played a Monroe-lookalike character.

== Early life ==
Kerridge was born in Wagga Wagga, New South Wales, Australia, and raised alongside her brother in Riverina on her parents' 5,000-acre (2,000 ha) sheep, cattle, and wheat farm. At age nineteen, she began working as a model in Hong Kong and the Philippines before moving to Paris. She subsequently settled in London, where she lived for two years studying art and continuing to work as a model.

== Career ==
After moving to Los Angeles, Kerridge was discovered by producers George G. Braunstein and Ron Hamady, who encountered her as she was walking on La Cienega Boulevard and noticed her striking resemblance to Marilyn Monroe. They offered her a part in Fade to Black (1980), a psychological horror film in which she starred as a Monroe-lookalike character opposite Dennis Christopher. She posed as Monroe for a Playboy photoshoot in their December 1980 issue. Kerridge likened her foray into acting as "falling into it by accident."

Kerridge's likeness to Monroe led to rampant interest from photographers and filmmakers who wanted to photograph and cast Kerridge as lookalike characters. She would appear as a Monroe double once more in Urs Egger's Go West, Young Man (1980).

In 1983, Kerridge had a supporting role in the drama Strangers Kiss, followed by a lead role in the comedy Surf II (1984). The same year, she appeared in Paul Morrissey's crime-drama Mixed Blood, a film about Brazilian drug dealers in Manhattan's Lower East Side. She later appeared in the sci-fi horror film Vicious Lips (1986), followed by a lead role in the thriller Down Twisted (1987). Kerridge's last film role was a supporting part in the comedy Alien from L.A. (1988).

== Personal life ==
Kerridge was married to actor Corey Parker from 1989 until 1992. They have one child.

In a 2016 interview, Kerridge said that she lived in the Blue Mountains region of Australia.

== Filmography ==
Year	Title	Role	Notes
1980	Fade to Black	Marilyn O'Connor	
1980	Go West, Young Man	Monroe Double	
1983	Strangers Kiss	Shirley	
1984	Surf II	Sparkle	
1984	Mixed Blood	Cheryl	
1986	Vicious Lips	Wynzi Krodo	
1987	Down Twisted	Soames	
1988	Alien from L.A.	Roeyis Freki / Auntie Pearl	

== Bibliography ==
- Bleiller, David (2001). TLA Film and Video Guide: The Discerning Film Lover's Guide 2000-2001. St. Martin's Griffin. ISBN 978-0-31224-330-2.
