= Domain (novel) =

1984 novel by James Herbert

- First edition (p/b)
- Author: James Herbert
- Language: English
- Genre: horror fiction, science fiction
- Publisher: New English Library
- Publication date: 1984
- Publication place: United Kingdom
- Media type: paperback and hardback
- Pages: 420 pp (paperback)
- ISBN: 0450058220 (paperback)
- OCLC: 1289891926
- Preceded by: Shrine
- Followed by: Moon

Domain (1984) is a horror novel by British writer James Herbert. The third and final novel of Herbert's Rats trilogy, it tells the story of how the rats have not only survived but begin to take over London from humanity in the aftermath of a nuclear strike.

== Background ==
Herbert's Rats trilogy was based in part on his own experiences in growing up among the Blitz-damaged areas of Whitechapel and Bethnal Green, east London, which were a haven for rats, and as a young adult he saw Todd Browning's 1931 Dracula, where the rat-infestation scene made a great impact on him; (Note: Herbert later described how he would scoot around the City and Moorgate which was "all empty, flattened, all bombsites with gutted houses".) he was later to claim that he conceived the idea after watching it.

== Plot ==
The book is divided into three sections: 'Advent', 'Aftermath' and 'Domain'.

The Houses of Parliament and Westminster Abbey, at the end of the road he had been totally destroyed. Peculiarly, the lower section of the tower housing Big Ben was still erect, sheered off at a hundred or so feet; the top section containing the clock face protruded from the river like a tilted, rock island. And again, surprisingly, only the southern end of Westminster Bridge had collapsed. It defiantly spanned the river, just failing to reach the opposite bank.

— Herbert's description of London immediately following the bombs.

A prologue describes rats living underground, listening to the nuclear attack—thought to have been a culmination of Middle Eastern geopolitical tensions—that devastates London. 'Advent' starts above ground. The book's protagonist, ex-pilot Mike Culver, attempts to escape with other people, but encounters Alex Dealey, a civil servant who has been temporarily blinded by the blasts. Dealey explains to Culver that he can save his life, if he follows directions. Culver manages to get them to the Chancery Lane bunker, but has to ignore all the people left above who will soon get caught in the fallout.

In the bunker, Culver meets Kate, and they develop feelings for each other. The second section, 'Aftermath', begins with a group of men from the bunker going above ground on a foraging mission. They eventually find their way to the main government bunker on the Thames Embankment, only to discover that the rats have already killed its inhabitants, including senior members of the government. Culver's party, now reduced in number, discover the rat nest, and the centre of which, directing the other rats, was a two-headed, sentient queen. She had given birth and the foetuses were similar to a human embryo.

The book ends with Culver, Dealey and the survivors being rescued by helicopter. They discover that it was China that launched the attack and was subsequently flattened; more people escaped London than was expected and while martial law now reigned a coalition government was about to be formed and society rebuilt.

However, there is an epilogue which describes the rats still underground in London, implying that they are planning to regroup and possibly spread.

== Themes and analysis ==
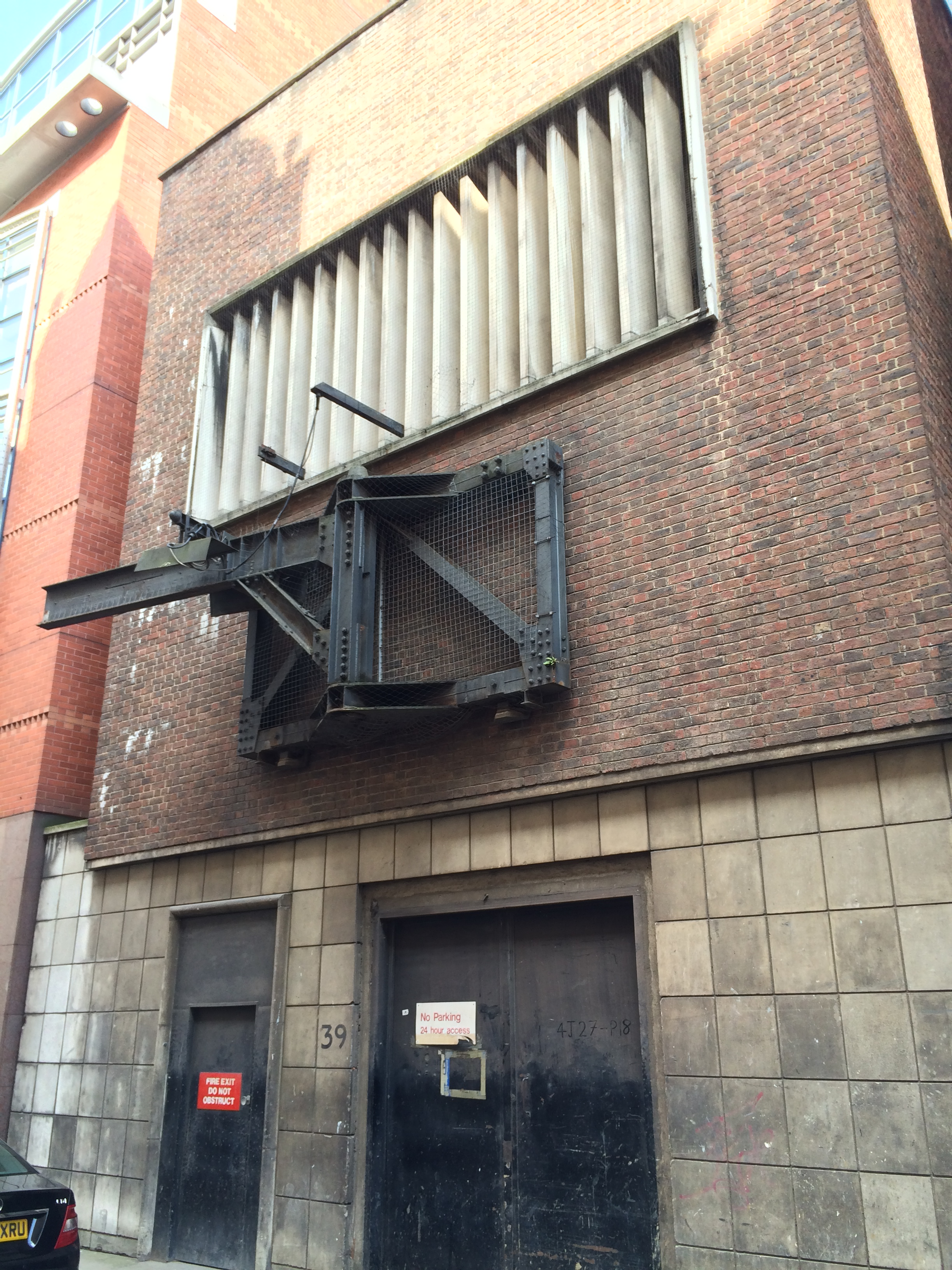
Entrance to Kingsway Telephone Exchange at 39 Furnival Street, London, similar to where Culver and Dealey go underground.

It is the third and last of Herbert's Rats trilogy, beginning in 1974 with The Rats, and followed five years later by Lair. Herbert noted that in Domain, the "horror continued—it was never truly beaten. Just as a real-life horror and evil are a continuum." However, in the last of the trilogy the nuclear holocaust is as much an influence on the story as the rats themselves, or as Herbert put it, "the rats are just an added ingredient, to give the book an extra dimension". Winter—writing soon after Domain's publication—saw this as indicating Herbert's "ever-growing ambition". Campbell has argued that the dystopian landscape is the book's major nexus, and makes Domain one of Herbert's "bleakest books, relieved only by irony and the occasional sense of the nightmarishly absurd". Campbell has also described the book as "only nominally a novel about the rats", and that its main message is a warning of the potential future.

Critics have noted that Herbert's early novels were often rooted in contemporaneous social politics. In The Fog, for example, the real enemy is not the escaped gas, or science, but the Ministry of Defence (MOD), the "great, faceless they". and, likewise, in Domain, the rats—by now even closer, descriptively, to humanity—represent the British establishment under Margaret Thatcher. Herbert compared his position to that of condemning the government that sends soldiers to war, while sympathising with the soldier himself. Herbert later expanded on this philosophy in his Authorised Biography, explaining that, while The Rats was "a critique of our governing bodies, who have successfully allowed our inner cities to rot", Domain not only validated that hypothesis but suggested that members of the governing bodies that created and allowed the creatures to exist would one day be devoured by their own creation. (Note: Cole argues that Domain's critiquing of the ruling class is more convincing than in Herbert's previous works, where Cole considers the theme to have been more of a "convenient device, gimmick even".) The critic Douglas E. Winter has suggested the rats can also be seen as symbolic of London's urban decay. The rats are not a natural phenomena, their mutation having been triggered by nuclear testing off Papua New Guinea. (Note: Morrison notes that this continues the theme of The Fog and The Dark, where the danger—the former, created by the MOD and the latter by people's evil—is also man-made.)

Stylistically, the literary critic Ramsey Campbell has suggested that Domain is exemplar of Herbert's ability to write intimate scenes which are as horrific as some of the broader set pieces. For example, he compares the mass destruction in the opening scenes of The Fog to Domains "drowning man dragged back from the relief of death to the devastated world". In a similar vein, Herbert told the writer Neil Gaiman that he "love[d] to do the big blockbuster type" such as Domain, as an opportunity for "all hell break[ing] loose, murder, mayhem, the whole bit", as well as the opportunity for intimate vignettes—in Domain, "especially bleak"—against the backdrop of broad events. (Note: Cole has argued that Herbert's use of the vignette is particularly successful because of how it firmly places characters—who would otherwise remain two-dimensional due the brevity of description—in the story's reality without slowing it.) These vignettes—sometimes almost short stories in themselves—highlight the hopelessness of the individual's situation: a greedy garage owner who delays finding shelter in order to collect his takings; a prostitute in the Park Lane Hilton who gets fused to a windowpane; a woman who fights off a rapist in the Royal Festival Hall; a deranged woman who props her decaying family up at the breakfast table and puts mouldy cornflakes before them; the insurance agent who suffocates in his shelter. In the longer term, however, Domain also suggests that humanity can still overcome the worst that is thrown at it. Although the rats are suggested to be no worse than mankind itself―indeed, Herbert's mankind has been called "essentially human animals"—sufficient goodness remains in the former to value. (Note: Herbert noted a similar approach to his earlier novel, Shrine, which he said "knocks religion, it knocks commercialism, but at the end there is something good out there".) This, argues Michael A. Morrison, demonstrates Domain's "conservative, essentially Christian theology, based on original sin and universal guilt". Yet no one, he argues, is innocent in Domain; the survivors are aware that they must bear the collective responsibility of mankind for the war, however they might blame governments. This is epitomized by Culver, who at one point goes mad, having

Witnessed the stark face of ultimate evil, the carnage of man's own sickness! The destructive force that was centuries old and inherent in every man, woman, and child! God forgive us all ... He closed his eyes and fought back the rage, the screaming despair.

The whole point of Domain was London being blown up but the leaders in our society—politicians and the people with influence—they have their underground shelters that they're going to go to once that four-minute warning sounds—they'll be down in the shelters. Us lot—we've had it.

— James Herbert, Danse Macabre 8 (January, 1986)

To Adrian Cole, Domain shows Herbert's increasing maturity as a writer: "Put crudely, The Rats was written principally from the guts and from the balls, whereas ... in particular Domain [is] written as much from the heart and the head". Morrison suggests that while its two rat-revelling predecessors were effectively pulp fiction, the final work possessed more nuanced social criticism. This maturity is also reflected, Cole suggests, in the depiction of Culver and Kate's burgeoning relationship; while his earlier attempts at writing such narratives were often "idealised ... or chauvinist", in Domain it "forms a solid backbone" for the action, without becoming self-indulgent. The relationship rounds out the characters and increases the reader's identification with them, and with this increases the reader's fears as to the characters' survival.

The rats becoming a superior rats from a previous role as secondary species, as the previous books had shown, thematically harked back to such films as Planet of the Apes, the rat packs of H. P. Lovecraft or the mutations of H. G. Wells's The Food of the Gods. Likewise, the conversations the bunker staff have among themselves regarding rebuilding society are similar to those of John Wyndham's survivors in The Day of the Triffids.

The MOD nuclear shelters in the London Underground network were based on an existing construction around the tunnels between High Holborn and Chancery Lane, with an entrance on Furnival Street. The journalist Maev Kennedy, writing in The Guardian, reported that "In the 1980s the novelist James Herbert pleaded to be allowed in but was turned down flat". Herbert said he had written to the then-owners, British Telecom, and asked them "I knew where it was, behind a brick wall with barbed wire on the top with observation cameras. It's meant to be just a telephone exchange and it has all this security?" (Note: In the narrative, Culver refers to the government shelter they were seeking as having "a thick brick wall with barbed wire on the top".)

In Herbert's final chapter of the rats' development, they have become a hybrid of the two species. Although Herbert has stated that it is not a rats novel, saying "I would like to write the novel of The City ... after Domain there was so much research left over, I could write another rats novel". The visceral visual imagery of Domain has been considered to have been "well served" by The City's graphic novel medium.

== Publication ==
Domain was first published by the New English Library in 1984 priced at £8.95 (equivalent to £29 in 2025). This was followed the following year with a print run of 400,000 books at £2.50 (equivalent to £8 in 2025). The first US edition came out the same year, retailing at $3.50 (equivalent to $11 in 2025), published by New American Library. The first foreign language edition was in German, published by Heyne in 1987, and selling for DM9.80 (equivalent to DM9 in 2021). (Note: All the US editions were issued in paperback; Herbert's first US novel to be originally in hardcover was to be Moon in 1986.) Domain was released in an abridged version as an audio tape for the blind in 1987, read by Christopher Lee.

The original US edition lacks several of Herbert's vignettes (Campbell speculates that they may have been "too uncomfortable" for the editor). As a result, some of them have been published there as discrete stories. One—the deranged woman serving breakfast—was published in Graham Masterton's Scare Care in 1989, with proceeds going to charities dealing with child abuse. Another, "Morris and Mog"—the story of the man who suffocates in his fallout shelter—was published in the anthology Masques II edited by J. N. Williamson in 1987. (Note: Both 'Breakfast' and Morris and Mog' were subsequently republished in a collection of essays edited by Stephen Jones in 1992.)

== Bibliography ==
- Bavidge, J. (2010). "Rats, Floods and Flowers: London's Gothicized Nature". In Phillips, L.; Witchard, A. (eds.). London Gothic: Place, Space and the Gothic Imagination. London: Continuum. pp. 103–120. ISBN 978-1-4411-0682-7.
- Cabell, C. (2013). James Herbert: The Authorised True Story 1943-2013. London: Metro Publishing. ISBN 978-1-78219-736-2.
- Campbell, R. (1986). "Herbert, James (1943– )". In Sullivan, J. (ed.). The Penguin Encyclopedia of Horror and the Supernatural. New York: Viking. pp. 200–201. ISBN 0-670-80902-0.
- Campbell, R. (1992). "Notes Towards a Reappraisal". In Jones, S. (ed.). James Herbert: By Horror Haunted. Sevenoaks: New English Library. pp. 289–298. ISBN 0-450-53810-9.
- Cole, A. (1992). "The Season of the Rat". In Jones, S. (ed.). James Herbert: By Horror Haunted. Sevenoaks: New English Library. pp. 99–104. ISBN 0-450-53810-9.
- Dziemianowicz, S. (1999). "Contemporary Horror Fiction, 1950–1998". In Barron, N. (ed.). Fantasy and Horror: A Critical and Historical Guide to Literature, Illustration, Film, TV, Radio, and the Internet. London: Scarecrow Press. pp. 199–345. ISBN 978-0-81083-596-2.
- Gaiman, N. (1988). "James Herbert: Growing Up in Public". In Fletcher, J.; Jones, S. (eds.). Gaslight & Ghosts. London: World Fantasy Convention/Robinson. pp. 13–20. ISBN 0-9513892-0-3.
- Gaiman, N. (1992). "The Craft". In Jones, S. (ed.). James Herbert: By Horror Haunted. Sevenoaks: New English Library. pp. 79–93. ISBN 0-450-53810-9.
- Herbert, J. (1985). Domain (1st pbk. ed.). Sevenoaks: New English Library. ISBN 0-450-06076-4.
- Holland, S. (21 March 2013). "James Herbert: Obituary". The Guardian. ISSN 0261-3077.
- Jones, S. (1992). "James Herbert: A Working Bibliography". In Jones, S. (ed.). James Herbert: By Horror Haunted. Sevenoaks: New English Library. pp. 302–317. ISBN 0-450-53810-9.
- Kennedy, M. (17 October 2008). "100ft Down, the Capital's Cold War Warren gives up its Final Secrets". The Guardian. ISSN 0261-3077.
- Lehmann-Haupt, C. (15 December 1986). "Books of The Times". The New York Times. OCLC 1645522.
- Morrison, M. A. (1992). "James Herbert and Science Fiction". In Jones, S. (ed.). James Herbert: By Horror Haunted. Sevenoaks: New English Library. pp. 137–150. ISBN 0-450-53810-9.
- Times Obituaries (21 March 2013). "James Herbert". The Times. ISSN 0140-0460.
- Walker, J. (2022). "Less Punk, More Splatter: Heavy Metal, Horror Video and the Literary Nasties of Shaun Hutson". Journal of Popular Culture. 55 (5): 1122–1143. doi:10.1111/jpcu.13170. ISSN 0022-3840.
- Winter, D. W. (1986a). "Urban and Pastoral Horror". In Sullivan, J. (ed.). The Penguin Encyclopedia of Horror and the Supernatural. New York: Viking. pp. 432–434. ISBN 0-670-80902-0.
- Winter, D. W. (1986b). "Writers of Today". In Sullivan, J. (ed.). The Penguin Encyclopedia of Horror and the Supernatural. New York: Viking. pp. 468–474. ISBN 0-670-80902-0.
