= The Secret of Crickley Hall (TV series) =

- Genre: Supernatural drama
- Based on: Novel by James Herbert
- Written by: Joe Ahearne
- Directed by: Joe Ahearne
- Starring: Suranne Jones; Tom Ellis; Douglas Henshall; David Warner; Sarah Smart; Iain De Caestecker; Olivia Cooke; Maisie Williams; Bill Milner; Susan Lynch; Pixie Davies; Kian Parsiani; Nick Sidi; Julia Ford; Elliot Kerley
- Composer: Dan Jones
- Country of origin: United Kingdom
- Original language: English
- No. of series: 1
- No. of episodes: 3

Production
- Executive producer: Hilary Martin
- Producer: Ann Harrison-Baxter
- Production locations: Chapel-en-le-Frith, Derbyshire; Downham, Lancashire; Liverpool, Merseyside.
- Cinematography: Peter Greenhaigh
- Editor: Graham Walker
- Running time: 57–59 minutes
- Production company: BBC Productions Salford

Original release
- Network: BBC America, BBC One
- Release: 18 November – 2 December 2012

The Secret of Crickley Hall is a 2012 BBC television adaptation by Joe Ahearne of the 2006 supernatural thriller novel of the same name written by the British author James Herbert. The show was globally distributed by BBC Worldwide.

The series presents two parallel dramas. The main storyline, set in 2006, follows the events of the Caleigh family who rent Crickley Hall because Gabe Caleigh (Tom Ellis) gets a short contract in the area; the other is a series of flashbacks following events in 1943 when orphans – who have been evacuated from London during World War II – are living at Crickley Hall.

Gabe Caleigh, his wife Eve, and their children, Loren, Cameron and Cally, live in London. One day Eve falls asleep for a few seconds at a playground and Cam simply disappears. Eleven months later, Gabe suggests relocating the family in the north of England, near the coast, in the hope that a change of scenery will give Eve some comfort, as she clings to the hope that Cam may still be alive.

== Cast ==
=== Present-day characters ===
Actor	Character	Character role	Episode
Suranne Jones	Eve Caleigh	Mother	1–3
Tom Ellis	Gabe Caleigh	Father, structural engineer	1–3
Maisie Williams	Loren Caleigh	Teenage daughter	1–3
Elliot Kerley	Cameron ("Cam") Caleigh	Missing son, aged five	1–3
Pixie Davies	Cally Caleigh	Youngest daughter	1–3
David Warner	Elderly Percy Judd	Former groundskeeper of Crickley Hall	1–3
Nick Sidi	The Reverend Andrew	Parish priest	1–2
Paul Clayton	Publican	The landlord of the Barnaby Inn	1
Velile Tshabalala	Teacher	Schoolteacher at Loren's school	1
Shannon Beer	Pupil	Responsible for bullying Loren at school	1–2
Susan Lynch	Lili Peel	Psychic medium	2–3
Donald Sumpter	Gordon Pyke	Parapsychologist	2–3
Annie Kelly	Elderly Magda	Surviving sister of Augustus	3
Ian Burfield	DI Michael	Policeman	3
Emma Hind	Unknown	Nurse	3

=== 1943 characters ===
Actor	Character	Character Role	Episode
Douglas Henshall	Augustus Cribben	Owner of Crickley Hall	1–3
Sarah Smart	Magda Cribben	Sister of Augustus Cribben	1–3
Olivia Cooke	Nancy Linnet	Teacher to the orphans	1–3
Iain De Caestecker	Percy Judd	Groundskeeper of Crickley Hall	1–3
Bill Milner	Maurice Stafford	Eldest orphan	1–3
Kian Parsiani	Stefan Rosenbaum	Jewish German orphan	1–3
Fern Deacon	Susan Trainer	Orphan	1–3
Craig Parkinson	The Reverend Horace	Parish priest	2–3
Julia Ford	Irene Judd	Percy's mother	2–3
John Sackville	Doctor David Wilcox	London hospital doctor who talks to Nancy	2
Theresa Churcher	Nurse	London hospital nurse who talks to Nancy	2

== Episodes ==
No.	Title	Directed by	Written by	Original release date	UK viewers (millions)
1	"Episode 1"	Joe Ahearne	Joe Ahearne	18 November 2012	6.65
During World War II, Crickley Hall is a home for orphans evacuated from London. In their attic bedroom, the eldest boy, Maurice Stafford, walks in and says to a small Jewish boy, Stefan Rosenbaum, that "Mr. Cribben wants to see you." Stefan runs out onto the landing and hides in an airing cupboard and starts to chant a prayer as Mr. Cribben walks up the stairs and opens the door and drags the boy out. A scream of terror and... Eve Caleigh wakes from a dream. She goes to her son Cam who has also had a bad dream. Eve prepares for work while her husband Gabe gets the children up and ready for the day. Eve leaves with Cam. When she collects Cam from day-care, it is revealed that she and Cam have a special relationship. On the way home, Cam asks if they can go to the play area. While he is playing on the slide, she sits down on a bench and looks over her notes. Eve falls asleep and starts to dream... Stefan screaming, "Let me go," while carried over the shoulder of a man... Eve wakes up and realizes that Cam is nowhere to be seen and the play area is empty. She cannot find him despite her frantic search. Gabe arrives while the police search the area. Eve admits she fell asleep and Gabe comforts her. Their daughters, Loren and Cally Caleigh, are told the horrifying news. Cally asks, "Why can't you hear him, Mummy?" Eve breaks down. When Eve returns to the playground with the police she joins a distraught Gabe who tells her that Cam "has gone." Eleven months later, Eve is walking home and sees a lost cat poster stuck over a missing Cam poster. She rips it off, screams in anger, and breaks down in the street. Gabe privately asks Loren how she would feel about moving as he wants to take Eve from their home during the anniversary of Cam's disappearance. He has a short contract in the north of England. She gives her support to the move. Eve has another dream of mixed scenes relating to Crickley Hall. As the Caleigh family drive through the village of Devil's Cleave and arrive at Crickley Hall, a sense of mystery and déjà vu comes over Eve. Their dog, Clyde, will not leave the car. Eve is drawn to look up at the attic room window. Clyde is also staring at it. When the two girls return from the attic room, Loren says to Eve that it is the only place she can get a mobile signal. In the dining room Eve asks Gabe if the house has a land-line telephone because she wants the police to be able to get hold of them should anyone come forward with information as it is the anniversary. A young teacher Nancy is being interviewed by the sister of Augustus Cribben. Magda Cribben calls for Stefan to come down to meet Nancy. Magda introduces them and tells her that Stefan is German and refuses to speak English, although he understands it well, and that he causes trouble. Magda takes Nancy to her brother's study and questions her suitability for the job and Nancy's arm injury. Magda refers to her brother's illness and the need for silence. Eve and Gabe explore the cellar and discover a deep well, while Loren and Cally are washing-up in the kitchen. They are startled by a man peering in through the window. Cally runs to the top of the basement steps and calls Eve who runs up to investigate. He is now sitting in the kitchen with Loren and he reveals that he is Percy Judd and he once worked at this house. Clyde is barking outside and Eve asks whether dogs are allowed. Percy replies in the negative but he will keep quiet about the dog as long as the children stay out of the cellar. Percy meets Nancy outside the front door and introduces himself as the groundskeeper of Crickley Hall... Percy is seen looking at the front door remembering this moment, then walks away. It is nighttime and a rattling noise is coming from the cupboard that Stefan hid in during the opening scene. Gabe goes to investigate and burns his hand on a hot pipe. The rest of the family get up to join him. After returning to bed, Loren hears a noise from the attic room. On investigation, they find the old toys from the orphans in a wardrobe and the dismantled beds from the children's room. The following morning Nancy arrives at the house and is greeted by Maurice at the front door. On entering, Magda asks her to remove her shoes as they create too much noise. The children's shoes are lined up in the entrance hall... Eve wakes up and upon going downstairs sees puddles on the floor and closes the cellar door. She is met by Gabe in the entrance hall who says that Clyde is upset. Eve says she feels close to Cam in the house. They return to bed but as they do, the cellar door opens on its own. The next day, the family go to the village pub for lunch. The landlord reveals the legend behind the village named Devil's Cleave. Back at the house, Clyde is attacked by something which comes out of the well. The family go to the village church where Gabe notices that many died in the village in 1943. Nancy is teaching the children in class, while discovering that Stefan is a Jew, and Maurice is antisemitic and xenophobic... Gabe sees Percy tending to the graves in the churchyard....and that the children are starved and are rewarded only with food and clothes. At the church, the Caleigh family are greeted by the Reverend Andrew, who tells them about the flash flood that struck the village in 1943. He tells Gabe not to trust Percy. Later, he tells Percy, "Let go of the orphans and Crickley Hall!" Maurice is told to get some water for Nancy, having been warned to keep away from the cellar. The Caleighs return home, and Clyde is missing. Percy and Nancy talk outside the pub and it is obvious that Percy has developed feelings for Nancy. Gabe and Loren search for Clyde, not knowing that Percy has him locked away. Nancy talks to Susan Trainer who reveals that Augustus uses the cane on the children inappropriately and threatens returning them to London. Nancy goes into the study and questions him about his use of the cane... Cally is in her bedroom and hears a noise in the hallway. She goes to open a door and Augustus canes her hand. Eve does not believe her when no marks are visible. Nancy examines the children's hands before they take part in an activity to ensure their hands are clean. She sees that although Stefan has no recent cane marks on his hands, he has them on his body. She sends Maurice to get Augustus. Maurice comes with Magda and a row ensues. Nancy stands up to them and slaps Magda who runs out the room. Nancy takes the children with her to the local authorities but the children are returned to the house because Magda and Augustus claim that the children have done the injuries to each other. Nancy and Percy watch as the children are escorted back into the house. They share a kiss as Percy offers her support. Loren is at school and a bully taunts her about her missing brother and that it was her mother's fault, Loren punches the girl on the nose. Eve repairs a spinning top after it fell out of the wardrobe in the attic the previous night. As she lets it spin, she can hear Cam's voice and they have an emotional conversation in which he says the ghosts know where he is, but he is not dead. Cally calls her and she runs into the entrance hall where Cally shows Eve that the ghosts of children are playing and can be seen running up the stairs. Eve follows them up to the attic room but as she reaches for the door handle, Augustus hits her hand with the cane, leaving a visual cane mark on her hand. She opens the door to an empty room. Cally says, "He doesn't like the children." A confused Eve asks, "Who?" Calley replies, "Can't you smell him?" Stefan is with Augustus who opens a book of a record of the children's punishments. In the basement, Augustus threatens to throw Stefan down the well to the devil if he does not change his ways. Gabe and Loren agree not to tell Eve about the bullying episode. Eve and Cally greet them at the front door and Cally tells them about the ghosts. Gabe is told that Eve heard Cam's voice, but Gabe doesn't believe her, while Calley and Loren play in the bathroom. When the family are all in bed, Augustus goes into Loren's room and beats her with the cane. Her parents run in and turn on the light to a distressed Loren. All but Eve vote to leave the house. Eve tells the children that the ghosts know where Cam is and so they must stay. As Eve sleeps, Augustus says, "She's mine."
2	"Episode 2"	Joe Ahearne	Joe Ahearne	25 November 2012	6.64
Eve discovers that Crickley Hall was an orphanage back in 1943 and seeks out the help of psychic, Lilli Peel, in the hopes that she will help Eve find out where Cam is. Back in 1943, it is revealed that Maurice and Magda are having a secret affair and upon being discovered by Nancy (who was searching for Augustus Cribben's punishment book) Maurice kills Nancy and throws her body down the well after desperate encouragement from Magda. In present day, Maurice, now under the alias of Gordon Pyke, visits Crickley Hall where the past comes back to haunt him.
3	"Episode 3"	Joe Ahearne	Joe Ahearne	2 December 2012	7.13
Eve becomes desperate for answers when Lilli claims the ghost of Augustus told her that Cam was dead and this is later revealed to be sadly true. In 1943, the secret of Crickley Hall is revealed when Augustus gases all the orphans to death, except Stefan who escapes and causes Augustus to fall to his death after hitting him with the very cane that Augustus used to brutally beat the orphans. Augustus, unable to stand up after this fall, drowns to death. In present day, Gordon/Maurice tries to kill Loren in the hope that Augustus will stop haunting him if he gets one more child. The series closes on a bittersweet note. The truth is finally out, and all the ghosts except Augustus move into the beyond. Cam's parents are relieved to learn that Stefan led a happy life after escaping the orphanage. They bury Cam in the plot next to Stefan's, and the program closes with them laying flowers on both their graves.

== Filming locations ==
At the very beginning of the film the house used was in Oxford Road, Altrincham. The village of Downham, Lancashire, was used for the village of Devils Cleave where the real village pub, The Assheton Arms, acted as the Barnaby Inn and the Devils Cleave church scenes were filmed at Downham St Leonard church. Crickley Hall itself was filmed at Bowden Hall, Chapel-en-le-Frith, Derbyshire. The war scenes are filmed on Huskisson Street, Falkner Street and Falkner Square around the Georgian Quarter in Liverpool.
