= The Survivor (Herbert novel) =

1976 horror novel by James Herbert

- First edition (h/b)
- Author: James Herbert
- Language: English
- Genre: Horror
- Publisher: New English Library
- Publication date: 1976
- Publication place: Great Britain
- Media type: Print (Hardback & Paperback)
- Pages: 206

The Survivor is a British horror novel written by James Herbert and published by the New English Library in 1976. It is the third novel by Herbert, and the second not part of a wider series. It was the basis of the 1981 film of the same name, starring Robert Powell and Jenny Agutter. Herbert described the movie as "terrible ... absolute rubbish."
