= Fluke (novel) =

1977 novel by James Herbert

- First edition (publ. New English Library)
- Author: James Herbert
- Language: English
- Publication date: 1977

Fluke is a novel by British novelist James Herbert. First published in 1977, it concerns a dog named Fluke.

== Plot ==
The novel starts with the birth of Fluke, a dog who soon realizes that he used to be a man. The book then follows Fluke's efforts to find out what happened to him and why he is a dog. Soon he starts to remember bits of his previous life and remembers he had a wife and daughter, and he works to reunite with his family. Along the way, he makes friends with a red dog named Rumbo who started life as a human, like Fluke. Rumbo is killed when a car in a scrap yard the dogs live in falls on him. Towards the end of Fluke Rumbo comes back as a red squirrel and later appears in the James Herbert novels The Magic Cottage and Once.

== Adaptations in other media ==
Fluke was adapted into a film in 1995, starring Samuel L. Jackson and Matthew Modine.
