= Deadly Eyes =

- Theatrical release poster
- Directed by: Robert Clouse
- Written by: Charles H. Eglee
- Based on: The Rats by James Herbert
- Produced by: Paul Kahnert; Jeff Schechtman
- Starring: Sam Groom; Scatman Crothers; Sara Botsford; Cec Linder; Lisa Langlois; Lesleh Donaldson
- Cinematography: René Verzier
- Edited by: Ron Wisman
- Music by: Anthony Guefenv
- Production companies: Golden Harvest; Toronto Filmtrusts Securities
- Distributed by: Warner Bros.
- Release date: 1 April 1983 (Detroit)
- Running time: 87 minutes
- Countries: Canada; Hong Kong
- Language: English
- Budget: CAD $1.5 million

Deadly Eyes (also known as The Rats, Rats and Night Eyes) is a 1982 natural horror film directed by Robert Clouse and starring Sam Groom, Scatman Crothers, Sara Botsford, Cec Linder, Lisa Langlois, and Lesleh Donaldson. A loose adaptation of the 1974 horror novel The Rats by James Herbert, it revolves around giant black rats who begin attacking and eating the residents of Toronto after ingesting contaminated grain.

== Plot ==
The plot centers on the film's leading man, Paul Harris, a divorced high school teacher and basketball coach and his interactions during a killer rat infestation with a health department inspector, Kelly Leonard, a high school cheerleader, Trudy White, his friend a professor and rat expert, Dr. Louis Spenser, and his students.

Giant rats the size of small dogs living in mountains of grain full of steroids are rendered homeless when Kelly orders it to be burned down. The Rats migrate to a suburban home occupied by unsupervised high school students. The rats begin to kill a toddler left unattended in a high chair. Henry Younger, a senior citizen was attacked by the rats, walking the snowy streets alone late at night. George Foskins, a health department field inspector, is destined to become the next victim. Inspecting the bowels of the city's sewer system, he encounters a pack of the rats. George commences with 'the running of the rats' in the sewer, followed by his demise.

Paul telephones his friend, Louis, who instantly concludes that the steroid feed had spawned a new breed of 'super-rat' that had migrated into the sewers in search of food. Upon hearing this information, the Health Inspector immediately orders the fumigation of the entire city sewer system, which is immediately and efficiently carried out with no apparent effect. The futility of this action is confirmed when the rat expert himself is attacked and killed. The rats then move on to a bowling alley and a movie theater and make their first brazen mass attack on the unsuspecting public. The rats select the viewers of a Bruce Lee film, resulting in numerous deaths, including Trudy, and a scene of fleeing film patrons.

Meanwhile, the city's mayor, Rizetti, prepares to make an inaugural run of a new subway section—straight into a hungry pack of rats. While escaping the rats, and sacrificing the other delegates, Mayor Rizetti stows away on the empty subway train. Paul attempts to stop the festivities. He is forced to assault a cop and take his revolver. Paul proceeds down the tunnel and finds a disabled subway train, with passengers just emerging from the cars.

Paul finds Kelly and his son just as the rats attack the passengers and Mayor Rizetti is killed by the rats off-screen. The three are able to escape down the tunnel and find refuge in a fenced-in maintenance area, which is the rats' nest. They discover cutting torches and drums of flammable liquids and soon, the three escape from the tunnel as the rats are killed during a flammable explosion behind him. After the three survivors re-board the subway train to reach safety, the train reaches the platform and the party-goers for the new subway section approach the train and to their shock, it is revealed that the three had boarded the same train as Mayor Rizetti did, which shows a small amount of surviving rats eating the body of the mayor, as the final scene shows a bloody rat hissing at the train window.

== Cast ==
- Sam Groom as Paul Harris
- Sara Botsford as Kelly Leonard
- Scatman Crothers as George Foskins
- Cec Linder as Dr. Spenser
- Lisa Langlois as Trudy White
- Lesleh Donaldson as Martha

== Production ==
The film was shot in Toronto from 21 January to 28 February 1982, on a budget of $1.5 million. Rather than using actual rats in the film, dachshunds wearing rat suits were used to achieve the effect of super-sized rodents.

Originally a British-set fiction novel, Deadly Eyes was instead set in Toronto, Canada, with scenic shots in the subway tunnels and snowy streets. Despite its Canadian setting, promotional posters sometimes featured images of a New York City skyline, complete with the then-iconic Twin Towers of the World Trade Center.

American singer Chuck McDermott, along with the Chuck McDermott Band, recorded two folk rock songs for the soundtrack, both of which were used throughout the film: "Lolita" and "So Right". Robert Clouse heavily featured the usage of his own 1978 Bruce Lee film Game of Death (a spin-off of the unfinished 1972 film Game of Death) in a gory theatre scene, as well as footage from an American children's educational television show called Curiosity Shop, and B.C.: A Special Christmas, which coincidentally had been airing in 1981, during the production of Deadly Eyes.

== Release ==
The film was distributed by Warner Bros. in Canada and the United States. It premiered in eighteen theatres in Detroit, Michigan on 1 April 1983.

=== Home media ===
Warner Bros. Home Entertainment released Deadly Eyes on VHS in 1983. Scream Factory released a DVD and Blu-ray combination set on 15 July 2014.

== Reception ==
On the review aggregator website Rotten Tomatoes, 43% of 7 critics' reviews are positive.

John A. Douglas of The Grand Rapids Press found the film's pacing uneven and its special effects "bargain basement," adding: "It falls into that awful limbo between good and really bad, reserved for those films which make little or no impression." Gene Siskel of the Chicago Tribune deemed it "an awful movie" despite it having moments of "goofy fun."

Despite this, Deadly Eyes has since received a cult following, with fans praising the acting of Scatman Crothers, the Chuck McDermott songs and the distinct Canadian setting, as well as the unintentional comedic aspects; Paul Freitag-Fey of Daily Grindhouse stated, "a goofy film, but one that's never dull and certainly entertaining enough to warrant the recent occasional cult reputation it's built." He also praised Deadly Eyes from a feminist standpoint, saying of the film, "the lead female characters manage to be something relatively rare in a horror film – women that have sexuality and power but don’t come off like dominatrixes or archetypical “slut” characters that exist as grist for the nudity mill."

== Remake ==
A 2002 remake of Deadly Eyes titled The Rats was written by Frank Deasy and directed by Child's Play franchise writer John Lafia, set in New York City. The remake was set to be released in September 2001, but was pushed back for editing due to featuring multiple scenic shots of the World Trade Center in the background, which were subsequently removed after the September 11th Attacks.

== Sources ==
- Freitag, Gina; Loiselle, André, eds. (2015). The Canadian Horror Film: Terror of the South. University of Toronto Press. ISBN 978-1-4426-2850-2.
- Turner, D. John, ed. (1987). Canadian Feature Film Index: 1913-1985. Canadian Film Institute. ISBN 0660533642.
- Vatnsdal, Caelum (2004). They Came From Within : A History of Canadian Horror Cinema. Arbeiter Ring Publishing. ISBN 1-894037-21-9.
