= The Spear (novel) =

1978 novel by James Herbert

- Cover of the first edition
- Author: James Herbert
- Language: English
- Genre: Thriller
- Publisher: New English Library
- Publication date: 1978
- Publication place: United Kingdom
- Media type: Print (hardcover)
- Pages: 279
- ISBN: 0-450-04040-2
- OCLC: 5892142
- Dewey Decimal: 823.914
- LC Class: PZ4.H5363

The Spear is a 1978 novel by British author James Herbert dealing with Nazi occultism and the Holy Lance. It was first published in by New English Library.

== Plot summary ==
The book deals with a neo-Nazi cult in Britain and an international conspiracy which includes a right-wing US general and a sinister arms dealer, and their obsession with resurrecting Heinrich Himmler by occult means.

== Reception ==
Ramsey Campbell praised the novel, saying "The Spear scores as a thriller, especially in its set pieces".

== Court case ==
In an earlier version of The Holy Blood and the Holy Grail/The Da Vinci Code lawsuit, Trevor Ravenscroft sued James Herbert claiming the novel infringed on his 1972 non-fiction book The Spear of Destiny.

While Herbert admitted to utilizing the book as a source, Ravenscroft claimed the book contained many instances of unauthorized borrowing. Herbert refused to pay him £25,000 in compensation, claiming Ravenscroft had himself plagiarized another author. Ravenscroft then sued him. During the trial, Herbert had a "strange experience" on a train, which he semi-seriously believed could be a psychic attack from Ravenscroft; during the trial Ravenscroft claimed he had met Herbert in a past life while Jesus was being executed. Herbert lost the court case and eventually removed the offending content from the book entirely, withdrawing its first edition from sale.
