= 22nd Saturn Awards =

US film and television award ceremony

- Date: June 25, 1996
- Site: California, U.S.

Highlights
- Most awards: 12 Monkeys (3)
- Most nominations: From Dusk till Dawn (8)

The 22nd Saturn Awards, honoring the best in science fiction, fantasy and horror film and television in 1995, were held on June 25, 1996.

== Winners and nominees ==
Below is a complete list of nominees and winners. Winners are highlighted in bold.

=== Film ===
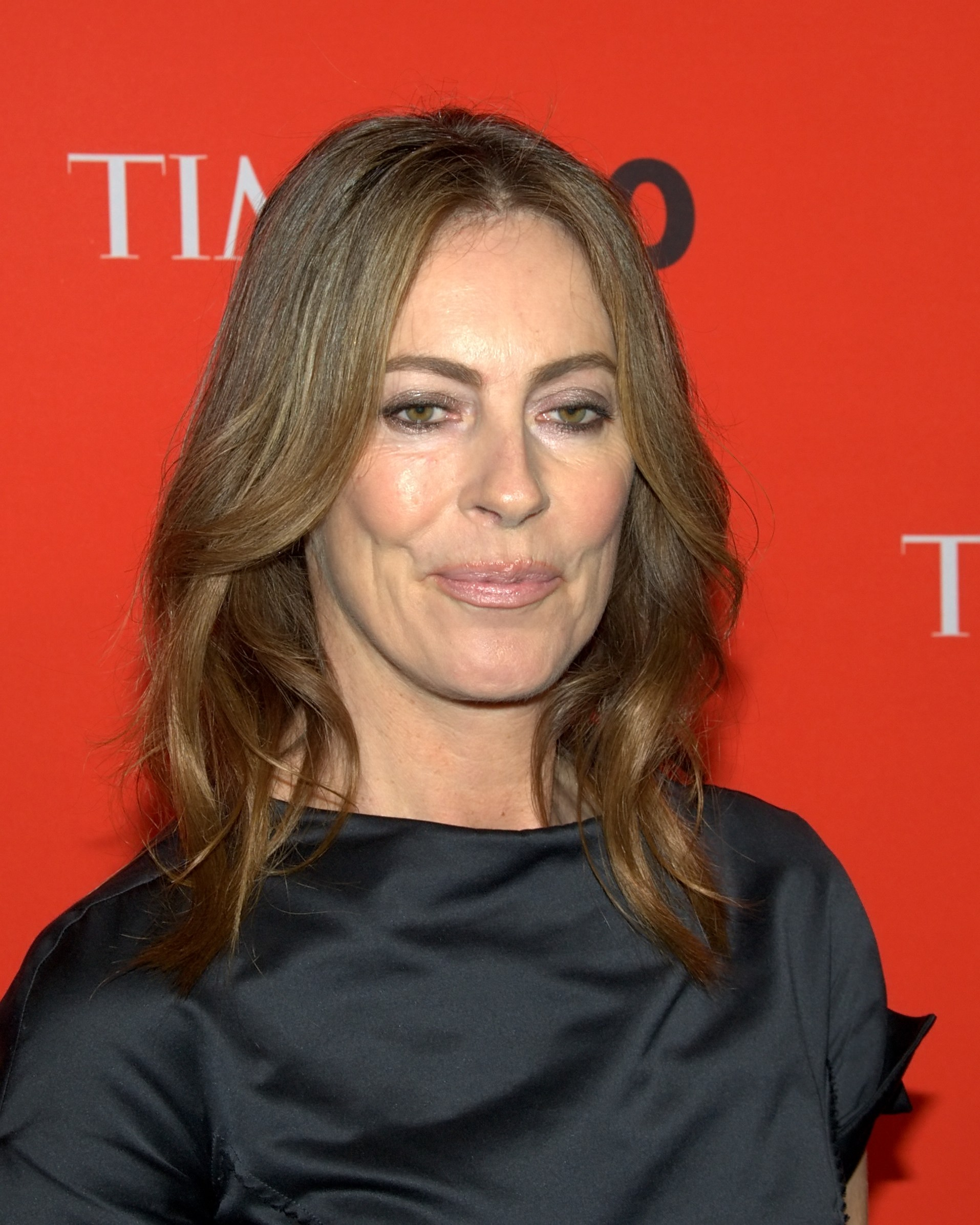
Kathryn Bigelow, Best Director winner

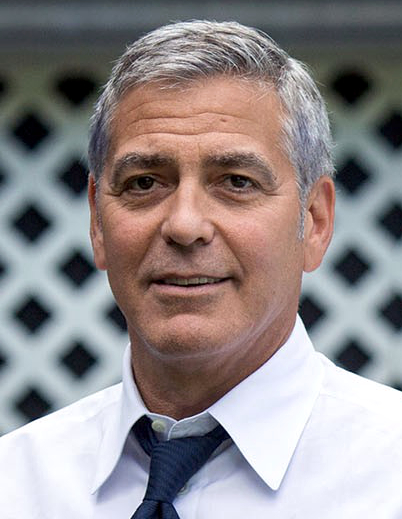
George Clooney, Best Actor winner

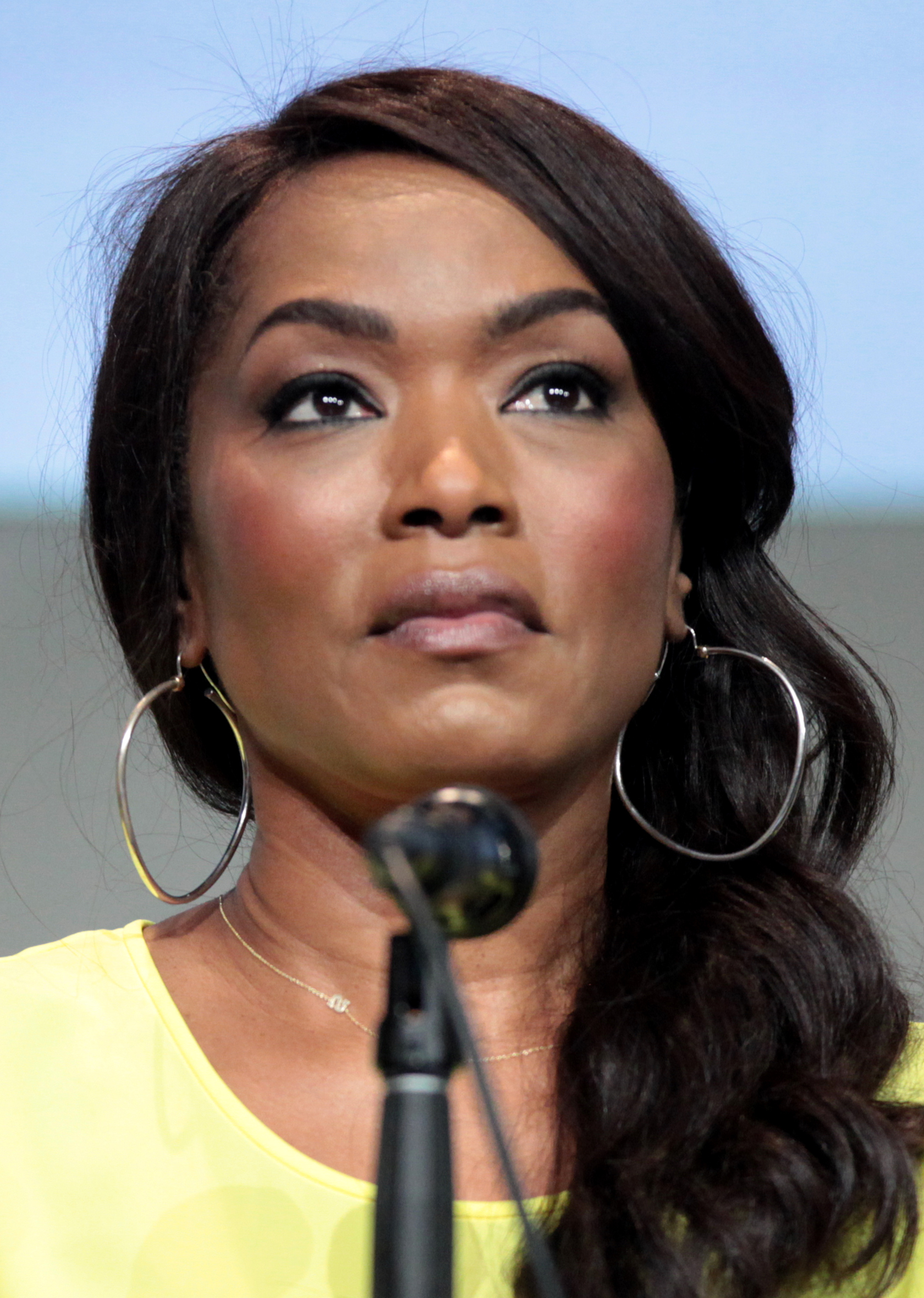
Angela Bassett, Best Actress winner

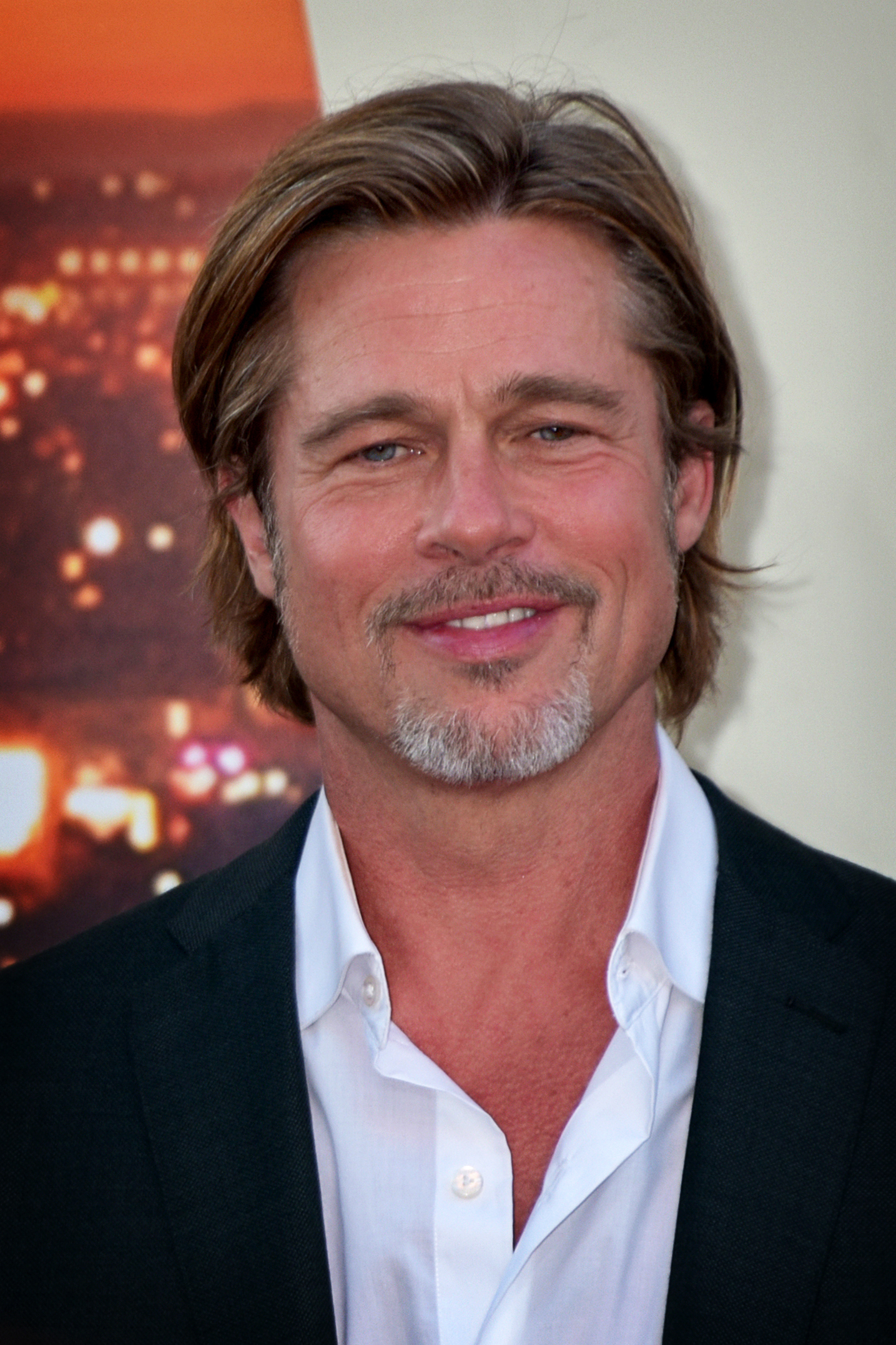
Brad Pitt, Best Supporting Actor winner

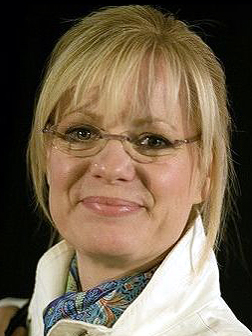
Bonnie Hunt, Best Supporting Actress winner

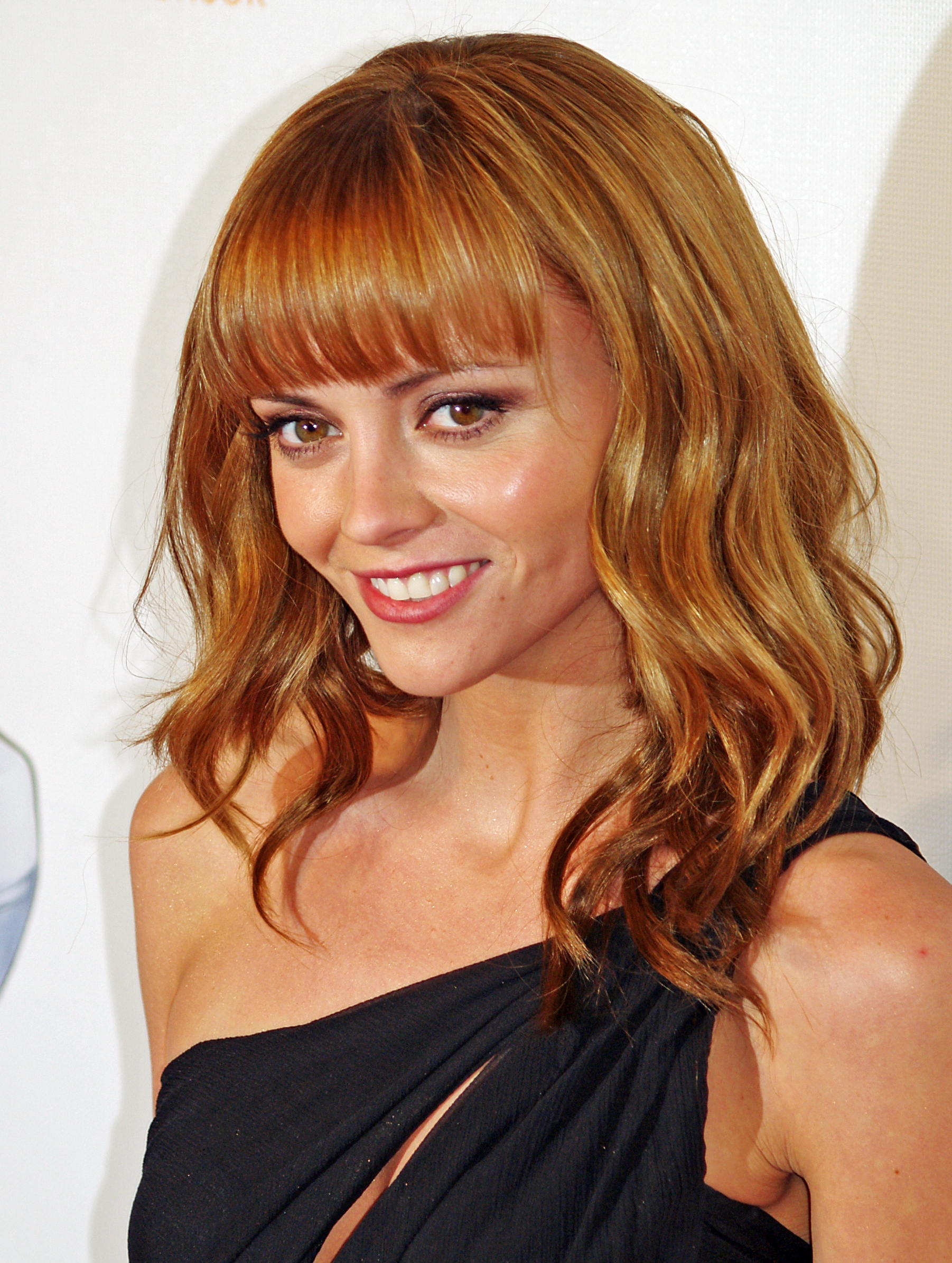
Christina Ricci, Best Performance by a Younger Actor winner

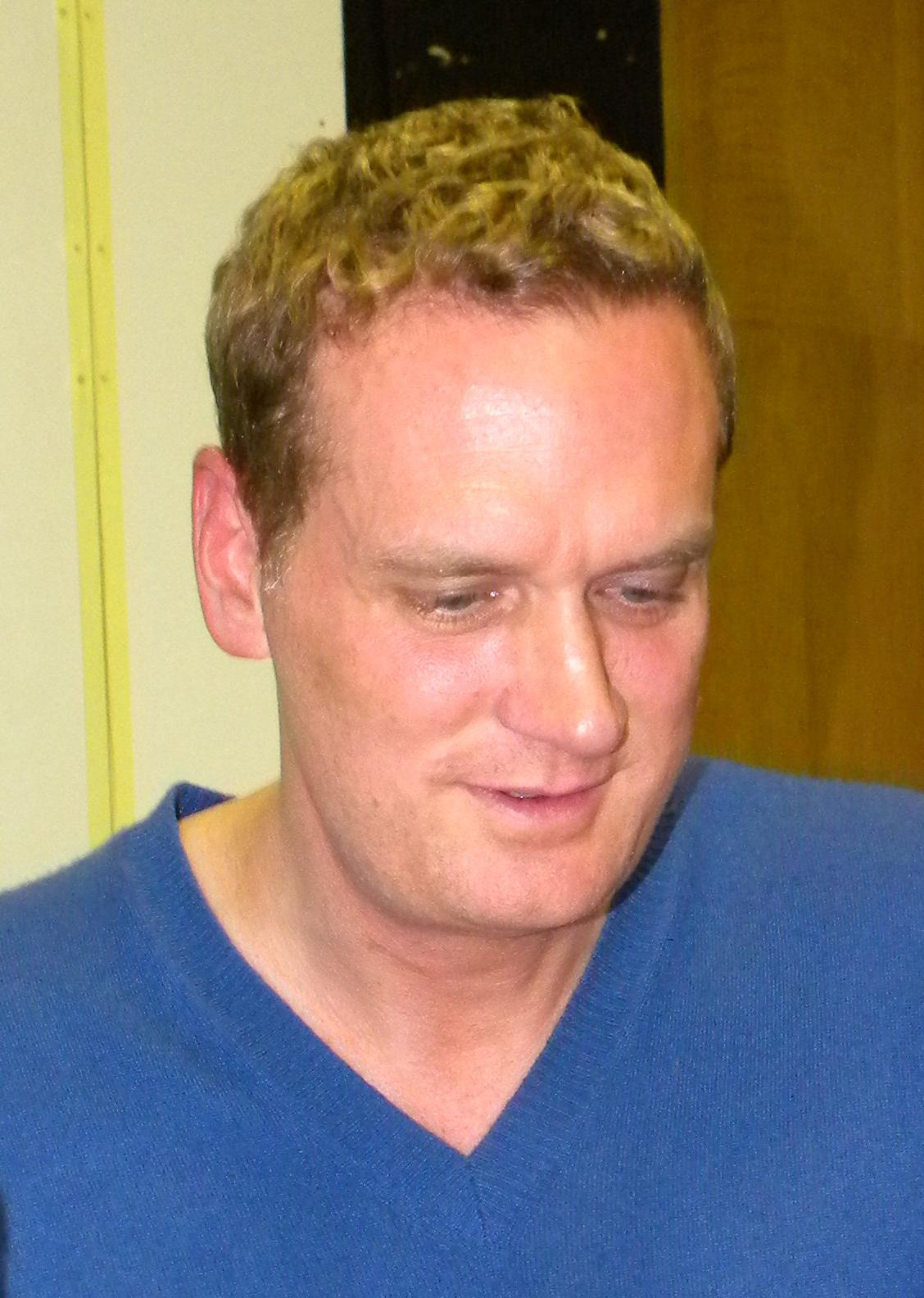
John Ottman, Best Music winner

Best Science Fiction Film	Best Fantasy Film
**12 Monkeys**; Congo; Judge Dredd; Outbreak; Species; Strange Days; Waterworld	**Babe**; Batman Forever; Casper; Fluke; The Indian in the Cupboard; Jumanji; Toy Story
Best Horror Film	Best Action/Adventure Film
**From Dusk till Dawn**; The City of Lost Children (La cité des enfants perdus); In the Mouth of Madness; Lord of Illusions; Mute Witness; The Prophecy; Tales from the Crypt: Demon Knight	**The Usual Suspects**; Apollo 13; Braveheart; Die Hard with a Vengeance; GoldenEye; Heat; Se7en
Best Director	Best Writing
**Kathryn Bigelow – Strange Days**; David Fincher – Se7en; Terry Gilliam – 12 Monkeys; Joe Johnston – Jumanji; Frank Marshall – Congo; Robert Rodriguez – From Dusk till Dawn; Bryan Singer – The Usual Suspects	**Andrew Kevin Walker – Se7en**; James Cameron and Jay Cocks – Strange Days; George Miller and Chris Noonan – Babe; David Webb Peoples and Janet Peoples – 12 Monkeys; Quentin Tarantino – From Dusk till Dawn; Joss Whedon, Alec Sokolow, Andrew Stanton, and Joel Cohen – Toy Story
Best Actor	Best Actress
**George Clooney – From Dusk till Dawn as Seth Gecko**; Pierce Brosnan – GoldenEye as James Bond; Ralph Fiennes – Strange Days as Lenny Nero; Morgan Freeman – Se7en as William Somerset; Robin Williams – Jumanji as Alan Parrish; Bruce Willis – 12 Monkeys as James Cole	**Angela Bassett – Strange Days as Lornette "Mace" Mason**; Kathy Bates – Dolores Claiborne as Dolores Claiborne; Nicole Kidman – To Die For as Suzanne Stone-Maretto; Sharon Stone – The Quick and the Dead as Ellen; Madeleine Stowe – 12 Monkeys as Kathryn Railly; Marina Zudina – Mute Witness as Billy Hughes
Best Supporting Actor	Best Supporting Actress
**Brad Pitt – 12 Monkeys as Jeffrey Goines**; Harvey Keitel – From Dusk till Dawn as Jacob Fuller; Val Kilmer – Heat as Chris Shiherlis; Tim Roth – Rob Roy as Archibald Cunningham; Quentin Tarantino – From Dusk till Dawn as Richie Gecko; Christopher Walken – The Prophecy as Gabriel	**Bonnie Hunt – Jumanji as Sarah Whittle**; Illeana Douglas – To Die For as Janice Maretto; Salma Hayek – Desperado as Carolina; Jennifer Jason Leigh – Dolores Claiborne as Selena St. George; Juliette Lewis – From Dusk till Dawn as Kate Fuller; Gwyneth Paltrow – Se7en as Tracy Mills
Best Performance by a Younger Actor	Best Music
**Christina Ricci – Casper as Kathleen "Kat" Harvey**; Kirsten Dunst – Jumanji as Judy Shepherd; Bradley Pierce – Jumanji as Peter Shepherd; Max Pomeranc – Fluke as Brian Johnson; Hal Scardino – The Indian in the Cupboard as Omri; Judith Vittet – The City of Lost Children as Miette	**John Ottman – The Usual Suspects**; Danny Elfman – Dolores Claiborne; James Horner – Braveheart; Howard Shore – Se7en; Christopher Young – Copycat; Hans Zimmer – Crimson Tide
Best Costume	Best Make-up
**Julie Weiss – 12 Monkeys**; John Bloomfield – Waterworld; Jean Paul Gaultier – The City of Lost Children; Charles Knode – Braveheart; Bob Ringwood and Ingrid Ferrin – Batman Forever; Gianni Versace and Emma Porteous – Judge Dredd	**Jean Ann Black and Rob Bottin – Se7en**; Rick Baker, Ve Neill, and Yolanda Toussieng – Batman Forever; Nick Dudman and Chris Cunningham – Judge Dredd; (K.N.B. EFX Group Inc.) – From Dusk till Dawn; (K.N.B. EFX Group Inc.) – In the Mouth of Madness; Steve Johnson, Bill Corso, and Kenny Myers – Species
Best Special Effects
**Stan Parks (Industrial Light & Magic (ILM), Amalgamated Dynamics) – Jumanji**; Eric Brevig (Industrial Light & Magic (ILM)) – The Indian in the Cupboard; John Dykstra, Thomas L. Fisher, Andrew Adamson, and Eric Durst – Batman Forever; Richard Edlund and Steve Johnson – Species; Scott Farrar, Stan Winston, and Michael Lantieri (Industrial Light & Magic (ILM)) – Congo; Joel Hynek (Mass. Illusions LLC) – Judge Dredd

=== Television ===
Best Genre Television Series	Best Single Genre Television Presentation
**The Outer Limits**; American Gothic; The Simpsons; Sliders; Space: Above and Beyond; Star Trek: Deep Space Nine	**Alien Nation: Millennium**; Alien Autopsy: (Fact or Fiction?); Attack of the Killer B-Movies; Goosebumps (Episode: "The Haunted Mask"); The Invaders; The Langoliers

=== Video ===
Best Genre Video Release
- **V: The Final Battle**
  - Beastmaster III: The Eye of Braxus
  - The Land Before Time III: The Time of the Great Giving
  - The Secret of Roan Inish
  - Terminal Voyage
  - Timemaster

=== Special awards ===
George Pal Memorial Award

- John Carpenter

Life Career Award

- Albert R. Broccoli
- Edward R. Pressman

Lifetime Achievement Award

- Harrison Ford

Special Award

- Castle Rock Entertainment

President's Award

- Robert Wise
- Bryan Singer
