= The Dark (Herbert novel) =

1980 novel by James Herbert

- First edition
- Author: James Herbert
- Language: English
- Genre: Horror
- Publisher: New English Library
- Publication date: 1980
- Publication place: United Kingdom
- Media type: paperback and hardback
- Pages: 448 (paperback)
- ISBN: 0450049701 (paperback)
- Preceded by: Lair
- Followed by: The Jonah

The Dark is a 1980 horror novel by James Herbert.

== Plot ==
Beginning in a small suburban street where an empty house is haunted by a malevolent, sentient darkness, the scope of the story expands as the darkness escapes and begins to engulf the city. The main character is Chris Bishop, a paranormal investigator called in initially to investigate claims that the house is haunted. There he discovers that those engulfed by the darkness are driven to savage and murderous frenzies, in connection with a mysterious cult leader whose spirit inhabits the darkness.

== Analysis ==
Herbert's seventh book, The Dark is one which explores religious and supernatural themes, part of a trend that began with the author's third novel, The Survivor. His first two books, The Rats and The Fog, fit more into the science fiction horror genre. One thing which connects The Dark with both Herbert's early and later supernatural work is the use of graphic violence and large-scale set pieces, such as, in The Dark, a football stadium ripped apart by insane fans.
