= The Rats (2002 film) =

2002 made-for-TV film by John Lafia

- Video cover
- Based on: The Rats by James Herbert
- Written by: Frank Deasy
- Directed by: John Lafia
- Starring: Mädchen Amick; Vincent Spano
- Music by: Elia Cmiral
- Country of origin: United States
- Original language: English

Production
- Producer: Bob Roe
- Cinematography: David Foreman
- Editor: Michael N. Knue
- Running time: 94 minutes
- Production companies: The Cort/Madden Company; Fox Television Studios

Original release
- Network: Fox
- Release: September 17, 2002

The Rats (working title: The Colony) is a 2002 American made-for-TV horror film written by Frank Deasy and directed by John Lafia, loosely based on the novel of the same name by James Herbert. The plot follows a clan of rats transformed, as part of a DNA research trial, into man-eating killers who take over a Manhattan department store and threaten to overrun New York City. Originally intended to air on September 17, 2001, its release was delayed after the September 11 attacks to remove shots of the World Trade Center towers. The film premiered on Fox on September 17, 2002.

== Plot ==
In Manhattan, when a client is bitten by a rat in the dressing room of Garsons Department Store and contracts Weil's disease, the manager Susan Costello is assigned to hire and help the best exterminator in New York, Jack Carver. Jack and his assistant Ty find a colony of mutant rats in New York City and try to convince the health department administrator and former partner of Jack, Ray Jarrett, how serious the infestation is. But the politician Ray is interested only in covering up the problem to protect the economic interests of powerful groups.

== Cast ==
- Mädchen Amick as Susan Costello
- Vincent Spano as Jack Carver
- Shawn Michael Howard as Ty
- Daveigh Chase as Amy Costello
- David Wolos-Fonteno as Ray Jarrett
- Sheila McCarthy as Miss Paige
- Kim Poirier as Jay
- Elisa Moolecherry as Nyla
- Joe Pingue as Karl
- Kathryn Winslow as Queen

== Reception ==
Andy Webb from The Movie Scene gave the film three out of five stars, stating: "What this all boils down to is that The Rats is some old-fashioned horror fun which plays on people's own fears of rats. Of course, if you think rats are cute and adorable then this isn't going to work and you might even be offended at the portrayal of rats or the ridiculous climax. But if you do have a fear of the furry [sic] rodents, this movie is not one to watch before you go to sleep." Rod Lott from Flick Attack wrote: "Come up with a cliché, and sooner or later, The Rats gets to it, right down to the ever-predictable it-ain’t-really-over final shot. Child’s Play 2 and Man’s Best Friend director John Lafia does a decent job, having experience with all sorts of beasts, like killer dolls, robot dogs and Ally Sheedy." Florita A. from Hell Horror scored the film 4 out of 10, writing: "The Rats was made simple, and that was not an ideal thing as the movie flopped although it was a TV movie. I like the idea of rats playing on someone’s fear, but it came down to the film not being executed in the right manner to send frights across to its audience, amongst other things."
