= The Fog (novel) =

1975 novel by James Herbert

- First edition
- Author: James Herbert
- Cover artist: Tim White
- Language: English
- Genre: Horror
- Publisher: New English Library
- Publication date: 1975
- Publication place: United Kingdom
- Media type: Print (Paperback & Hardback)
- Pages: 267 (first edition, paperback)
- ISBN: 0-450-03045-8 (first edition, paperback)
- OCLC: 59254398

The Fog is a horror novel by English writer James Herbert, published in 1975. It is about a deadly fog that drives its victims insane when they come into contact with it.

== Plot summary ==
John Holman is a worker for the Department of the Environment investigating a Ministry of Defence base in a small rural village. An unexpected earthquake swallows his car releasing a fog that had been trapped underground for many years. An insane Holman is pulled up from the crack, a product of the deadly fog.

Soon the fog shifts and travels as though it has a mind of its own, turning those unfortunate enough to come across it into homicidal/suicidal maniacs who kill without remorse, and often worse. Respectable figures including teachers and priests engage in crimes ranging from public urination to paedophilia. A Boeing 747 pilot is also driven insane and crashes the aircraft into the Post Office Tower (now BT Tower) in London.

Soon a bigger problem is discovered – the fog is multiplying in size and nothing seems to be able to stop it. Entire villages and cities are in danger and the only chance left is to use the treated and immunized John Holman to take on the fog from the inside where who knows what awaits him.

== See also ==
- The Mist, a 1980 Stephen King novella
- Blackgas, a Warren Ellis comic book miniseries with a similar plot
- Crossed, an Avatar Press comic book franchise with a similar plot
- The Sadness, a 2021 movie with a similar plot

== Trivia ==
A translation of The Fog to Arcateenian (an alien language) is mentioned in British sci-fi TV series Torchwood.
