= Lair (novel) =

1979 novel by James Herbert

- First edition (p/b)
- Author: James Herbert
- Language: English
- Genre: horror fiction, science fiction
- Publisher: New English Library
- Publication date: 1979
- Publication place: United Kingdom
- Media type: paperback and hardback
- Pages: 272 pp (paperback)
- ISBN: 0450049701 (paperback)
- Preceded by: The Rats
- Followed by: Domain

Lair is a 1979 science fiction horror novel by James Herbert, the first sequel to his debut The Rats and sixth book overall. He wrote two more sequels in the series after this: 1984's Domain and 1993's The City. The latter was a graphic novel.

Each book charts the spread of a mutant breed of carnivorous rat which attacks humans in groups, rips them apart, and devours them. While the first book was set among the market stalls and streets of London, this one moves the action to the English countryside.
