= The Magician's Elephant (film) =

2023 film by Wendy Rogers

- Official release poster
- Directed by: Wendy Rogers
- Screenplay by: Martin Hynes
- Based on: The Magician's Elephant by Kate DiCamillo
- Produced by: Julia Pistor
- Starring: Noah Jupe; Mandy Patinkin; Brian Tyree Henry; Natasia Demetriou; Sian Clifford; Benedict Wong; Miranda Richardson; Kirby Howell-Baptiste; Aasif Mandvi; Pixie Davies; Dawn French
- Edited by: Robert Fisher Jr.
- Music by: Mark Mothersbaugh
- Production companies: Pistor Productions; Netflix Animation Studios
- Distributed by: Netflix
- Release date: March 17, 2023
- Running time: 100 minutes
- Countries: United States; Australia
- Language: English

The Magician's Elephant is a 2023 animated fantasy adventure film directed by Wendy Rogers, written by Martin Hynes and produced by Julia Pistor. Based on the 2009 novel by Kate DiCamillo, the film features the voices of Noah Jupe, Mandy Patinkin, Natasia Demetriou, Benedict Wong, Miranda Richardson and Aasif Mandvi. Animated by Animal Logic, the film was distributed by Netflix and released on March 17, 2023.

== Plot ==
After the war, Baltese lost hope in magic and warmth, focusing on domestic animals. Peter, an orphan raised by soldier Vilna Lutz, approaches a fortune teller out of curiosity. Vilna had sent Peter to buy bread and fish, training him for war to boost his survival chances. Vilna saved Peter from the front after his family was killed and raised him to endure war's harshest conditions.

Vilna felt guilty for not saving Peter's sister, Adele, and lied about her death. A bomb led him to believe they were gone. Peter never searched for her, thinking she was dead. Vilna believed hope would hinder Peter as a soldier. Peter, curious about the Fortune Teller, learned that Adele was alive, and to find her, he must follow the elephant.

A magician accidentally summoned an elephant during an opera. This act was meant to restore hope, but it led to chaos when the elephant injured a noblewoman. The elephant's arrival brought joy to a boy searching for his sister.

Adele was raised by her nurse, Sister Marie, who traveled to the army camp after Vilna's words but found it destroyed by a bomb. Sister Marie took Adele to the outskirts for safety. She shared Vilna's guilt, constantly reminded of letting Peter go and wishing she had saved them. She loved Adele and granted her wish to visit the elephant, viewing her as a sign of hope.

Peter seeks to rescue a locked elephant to find his sister, with help from neighbor Leo Matiennel. The Countess fears releasing the elephant due to potential threats. The King gives Peter three tasks, starting with defeating Romain De Smedt. Peter retrieves a stolen book, wins Romain over, and inspires him.

Peter's second task was to fly using Leo and Gloria's parachute. He impressed the King and then tried to make the Countess laugh after her brother's death. His joke failed, but she fake-laughed, so the King stayed out of it. When an elephant sneezed on the King, the Countess laughed genuinely, making the King smile and declare Peter the winner.

Peter initially wanted to use the elephant to find Adele but then chose to help the elephant find her family instead. He cared for her deeply. After losing ownership, he wished for her to return to her habitat. The elephant symbolized the town's lost trust. The Countess laughed after her grief, signaling her emotional recovery. The magician struggled due to the townspeople's disbelief, but eventually gained their trust and successfully sent the elephant home.

Adele met her brother Peter, who struggled to make the Countess laugh, revealing familiarity. She asked why he let the elephant go, as he was meant to follow her. Its disappearance lifted the town's curse and gave hope. Vilna, inspired, left his wheelchair to walk with a cane. Proud, he met Sister Marie, believed dead with baby Adele. Shocked to find Peter and Vilna alive, they reunited, ending a long war that caused the town to forget how to feel, and this lifts Baltese's hope. The story ends happily with Peter, Adele, and their new family enjoying a meal amidst joy and laughter.

== Voice cast ==
- Noah Jupe as Peter, an orphan being raised by his veteran guardian, Vilna
- Mandy Patinkin as Vilna Lutz, a former soldier who is the guardian of Peter
- Brian Tyree Henry as Leo Matienne, Peter's downstairs neighbour, husband of Gloria and the captain of the guards
- Natasia Demetriou as The Fortune Teller, the narrator of the film
- Sian Clifford as Gloria Matienne, Peter's downstairs neighbour and wife of Leo
- Benedict Wong as The Magician
- Miranda Richardson as Madam LaVaughn
- Kirby Howell-Baptiste as The Countess
- Aasif Mandvi as The King
- Pixie Davies as Adele, Peter's long lost sister
- Dawn French as Sister Marie

== Production ==
On August 17, 2009, 20th Century Fox announced that Martin Hynes would adapt a novel titled The Magician's Elephant, which was yet to be released, into a feature film. In that same announcement, former Nickelodeon Movies producer Julia Pistor was also confirmed as the producer of the film. On December 15, 2020, after languishing into development hell for a number of years, it was announced that Pistor had taken the property to Netflix who acquired the film rights to the book and screenplay to develop the animated feature film, with Animal Logic in Sydney working on the animation. In the same announcement, Noah Jupe, Benedict Wong, Pixie Davies, Sian Clifford, Brian Tyree Henry, Mandy Patinkin, Natasia Demetriou, Aasif Mandvi, Miranda Richardson, and Kirby Howell-Baptiste were all cast to star in the film.

== Release ==
The Magician's Elephant was released on March 17, 2023.

== Reception ==
On the review aggregator website Rotten Tomatoes, 67% of 37 critics' reviews are positive, with an average rating of 6.5/10. The website's consensus reads: "Always well-intentioned and once-in-a-blue-moon compelling, The Magician's Elephant is an adaptation with a message about believing in yourself unveiled with more whimsy than magic." Metacritic, which uses a weighted average, assigned the film a score of 53 out of 100, based on seven critics, indicating "mixed or average" reviews.
