= John Sackville (actor) =

English actor

Sackville at the 2026 BFI London Film Festival

John Sackville is an English actor, best known for his role as the villainous Robert Frobisher Smythe in the British-American TV series House of Anubis, in which he co-starred with Alexandra Shipp He has worked in theatre, film and television.

== Career ==
Sackville was born in Norfolk. He was educated at Wells Cathedral School in Somerset and St Andrews University. Afterwards, he trained at the Webber Douglas Academy of Dramatic Art.

On stage he has performed with the National Theatre, the RSC and in the West End. While at the RSC, performing in Michael Attenborough's critically acclaimed Othello with Ray Fearon and Richard McCabe and Volpone, with Guy Henry, he produced, directed and featured in a short film, The Mosquito, The Flea, The Fly, funded by The Other Place.

In 1998 he played the lead role of Kevin in the British premiere of Party at the Arts Theatre. In 2005 he performed as a double-act with Russ Abbot, playing the title role in Lord Arthur Savile's Crime. In 2006 he played William Roper alongside Martin Shaw in A Man for All Seasons at the Theatre Royal, Haymarket. Both shows were produced by Bill Kenwright. In 2008 he starred as Pope John Paul II in BBC1's Young John Paul II: Witness to Evil.

In 2011, Sackville starred alongside Carla Juri in the feature film Fossil, shot on location in the Dordogne. In 2012 he appeared as Dr David Wilcox in the BBC's The Secret of Crickley Hall, opposite Olivia Cooke. In 2012-13 he played lead regular Robert Frobisher Smythe in the series House of Anubis. In 2014 he played the Reverend John Clarke opposite Anne Archer in The Trial of Jane Fonda in London and at the Edinburgh Festival. In the same year Sackville co-starred with Mischa Barton in the film The Hoarder, set in New York. In 2015 he was cast in the new Netflix series The Crown, playing alongside John Lithgow and Jeremy Northam, and as George VI in the BBC's Royal Wives at War opposite Gina McKee.

In 2016 he played the role of Simon Beauclerk in James Gray's The Lost City of Z, working with Charlie Hunnam and Robert Pattinson. He also began filming Season Two of The Crown, working opposite Anton Lesser. In 2017 he was cast as R Davis Halliwell in the new 20th Century Fox series Genius and as the title role in William Wordsworth for English Touring Theatre. He also took the lead role of Julian Anson - "elegantly played by John Sackville" as reviewed by The Guardian's Michael Billington - in a rare revival of N.C. Hunter's A Day by the Sea at Southwark Playhouse.

In 2018 he was cast in the role of Douglas Eden in Joe Hill-Gibbins' production of Absolute Hell at the National Theatre. He was then cast as Robin Day in Misbehaviour, directed by Philippa Lowthorpe, playing opposite Keira Knightley. In 2019 he played Henry VI in the Headlong adaptation of Shakespeare's play Richard III, directed by John Haidar, followed by the role of Thomas Armstrong in Go Bang Your Tambourine at the Finborough Theatre, and received the 2020 Offie for Best Male Performance in a Supporting Role in a Play. He was also nominated for Best European Actor at Amsterdam's New Vision International Film Festival for his role as Harry in Into the Mirror In 2020 he worked with Anne Hathaway and Chiwetel Ejiofor on Steven Knight's film Locked Down, directed by Doug Liman. In 2021 he played Charlie Dyer in the first London revival of Staircase, a part originally performed by Paul Scofield in 1966, in one of the first dramas to explore same-sex relationships at a time when they remained illegal. In 2022 he directed his adaptation of T.S.Eliot's The Waste Land at the Jermyn Street Theatre. He also worked with director Mike Barker, playing Hugh Butterworth in 20th Television's pilot for The Bends. In 2023 he played opposite Linda Bassett in Call the Midwife and Russell Tovey in Paul Andrew Williams's Suspect for Disney+.

In 2024 Sackville played Hitler's lawyer Dr Hans Knie in Angel Films' Truth & Treason alongside Rupert Evans. In 2025 he filmed the role of Lord Mortimer in Anna Biller's The Face of Horror, with Jonah Hauer-King and Bella Heathcote.

He lives in London.
