= Fluke (film) =

1995 film by Carlo Carlei

- Theatrical release poster
- Directed by: Carlo Carlei
- Screenplay by: Carlo Carlei; James Carrington
- Based on: Fluke by James Herbert
- Produced by: Paul Maslansky; Lata Ryan
- Starring: Matthew Modine; Nancy Travis; Eric Stoltz; Jon Polito; Max Pomeranc
- Cinematography: Raffaele Mertes
- Edited by: Mark Conte
- Music by: Carlo Siliotto
- Production companies: Metro-Goldwyn-Mayer Pictures; Rocket Pictures
- Distributed by: MGM/UA Distribution Co. (United States); United International Pictures (International)
- Release date: June 2, 1995
- Running time: 96 minutes
- Country: United States
- Language: English
- Box office: $3.9 million

Fluke is a 1995 American fantasy drama film directed by Carlo Carlei from a screenplay by Carlei and James Carrington, based on the 1977 novel of the same name by James Herbert. It stars Matthew Modine as a self-centered businessman who is reincarnated as a dog and attempts to reconnect with his family. Nancy Travis, Eric Stoltz, Jon Polito, Max Pomeranc, and Samuel L. Jackson appear in supporting roles.

The film was theatrically released in the United States on June 2, 1995, by MGM/UA Distribution Co. It received mixed to negative reviews from critics and underperformed at the box office, grossing only $3.9 million. At the 22nd Saturn Awards, it earned two nominations: Best Fantasy Film and Best Performance by a Younger Actor for Pomeranc.

== Plot ==
A mutt puppy who has flashing memories and dreams of having lived a human life is taken to a pound and eventually escapes. He is raised by an elderly homeless woman named Bella, who gives him the name Fluke, stating that he is a "fluke by nature, Fluke by name." Fluke supports Bella by helping her earn money from passing strangers, who are impressed with Fluke's ability to beat Bella's shell game.

After Bella dies of an illness, Fluke meets a street-wise dog named Rumbo who takes him to see a man named Bert who feeds them. Fluke matures into an adult dog and eventually realizes that he was once a man named Thomas P. Johnson, who died in a car crash.

Fluke is abducted by a man named Sylvester to be used in makeup experiments at a cosmetics company. During his captivity, Rumbo comes to the rescue, but is shot by Sylvester as he and Fluke escape. A dying Rumbo tells Fluke that the black-and-white snapshot of a man in a sailor suit on Bert's wall was him and Bert was his brother and that he wishes to smell the sea again, suggesting that he died in the line of duty.

After Rumbo's death, Fluke seeks out his surviving wife Carol and son Brian and reunites with them by becoming their new family dog. Though Carol is apprehensive about adopting Fluke, she caves in, seeing how Brian has quickly bonded with Fluke. During his life as a dog, Fluke gets to know his family better and realizes that he had been a distant workaholic.

As more memories return, Fluke suspects that his human death was caused by his former business partner, Jeff Newman. Enraged by this and that Jeff is now dating Carol, Fluke viciously attacks him when he visits the house, and ends up getting put outside. Jeff calls for Animal Control against the protests of Brian, and Fluke is forced to run from the premises.

The next night, Brian goes missing while looking for Fluke and Carol implores Jeff to help, so Jeff drives back to their house. Fluke, hiding in the backseat of Jeff's car, comes close to killing Jeff by causing him to get into a car accident like his own. Fluke then has another flashback and realizes that Jeff wasn't responsible for his death. Instead, Fluke had caused his own death when he recklessly drove on the wrong side of the road just to argue with Jeff one night and swerved off to avoid hitting an oncoming truck. Jeff then tried to save him, but failed. An injured Jeff, implied to have realized Fluke's true identity but bearing no ill will, tells Fluke to go find Brian before the latter catches hypothermia from the falling snow. Regretful over his actions, Fluke barks for a passing driver to help Jeff before running off.

On a hunch, Fluke goes to the graveyard where he had been buried and finds Brian there, who had been locked in by an unaware groundskeeper. Fluke huddles with Brian to keep him warm. Carol, deducing from one of Brian's drawings where he may have gone, uses her car to break open the cemetery gates and picks up Brian. Carol tries to coax Fluke to come home with them. Instead, Fluke digs away at the snow in front of his tombstone to show Carol who he really is by uncovering the word "forever" at the bottom, a phrase he often said to her as a human. Carol is left speechless and lets Fluke leave without objection. With a heavy heart, Fluke departs and entrusts his family to Jeff for their happiness. He monologues that he finally accepted that he can no longer be the family man he should have been, and that he should cherish the life he has now.

Sometime later, Fluke is resting under a tree on a farm by himself. To his surprise and happiness, he is reunited with Rumbo, now reincarnated as a squirrel. Rumbo tells Fluke about life as a squirrel and about reincarnation.

== Cast ==
- Comet as Fluke, a dog who Thomas Johnson reincarnates into after his death
- Matthew Modine as Thomas P. Johnson, a workaholic, Jeff's best friend, Carol's husband, and Brian's father. As Fluke the dog, his struggle to return to his former human life ultimately teaches him the importance of moving on
- Nancy Travis as Carol Johnson, Thomas's wife, Brian's mother. She is shown to be not fond of dogs and is even borderline hostile towards Fluke. By the end of the film, she is implied to have increased empathy for animals after realizing Fluke's true identity
- Max Pomeranc as Brian Johnson, Thomas and Carol's son. Despite Thomas's workaholic ways, Brian remembers his dad fondly, and is shown to miss him dearly
- Eric Stoltz as Jeff Newman, Thomas's best friend. In the years since Thomas's death, he has begun to fill the void Thomas left behind
- Bill Cobbs as Bert
- Ron Perlman as Sylvester
- Jon Polito as Boss
- Collin Wilcox Paxton as Bella, a kindly old homeless lady who cares for Fluke for some time until her death
- Georgia Allen as Rose, a cleaning lady

=== Voices ===
- Matthew Modine as Fluke
  - Sam Gifaldi as young Fluke
- Samuel L. Jackson as Rumbo, Fluke's best friend

== Production ==
Italian filmmaker Carlo Carlei wrote the adaptation of James Herbert's Fluke with co-writer James Carrington with the intention of getting the film greenlit at a major Hollywood studio. Carlei had come close to getting the film greenlit at Paramount Pictures for producer Fred Roos, but the departure of Sid Ganis as the studio's head of production derailed development. Then Metro-Goldwyn-Mayer co-chairman and chief executive officer Alan Ladd Jr. upon screening Carlei's Flight of the Innocent was impressed enough where Ladd acquired Flight of the Innocent for U.S. distribution and signed Carlei to a one-picture deal with Fluke being greenlit. The film was shot in Atlanta, Georgia for twelve weeks in 1994.

== Release ==
The film was theatrically released on June 2, 1995. A home video release followed on November 21, 1995.

=== Home media ===
Fluke was released on VHS on November 21, 1995, and LaserDisc on November 28, 1995, by MGM/UA Home Video in North America (which was presented in the theatrical version and available exclusively through Warner Home Video). Fluke was also released on VHS on November 5, 1996, by MGM/UA Family Entertainment in North America (which has been edited for family viewing and was also available exclusively through Warner Home Video). In Japan, Fluke was released on VHS on July 5, 1996, by Warner Home Video under the MGM/UA Family Entertainment label (which was presented in the theatrical version).

== Reception ==
=== Box office ===
The film was a box-office bomb, grossing $3,987,768 in North America.

=== Critical response ===
On the review aggregator website Rotten Tomatoes, 31% of 13 critics' reviews are positive, with an average rating of 3.9/10.

Caryn James of The New York Times described Fluke as "the kind of pompous movie in which Fluke learns some life lessons and Mr. Modine says in a high-serious voice-over" and stated, "Though it is meant to be whimsical and touching, the film's style is leaden, and its story has more danger than excitement. […] Fluke is too serious for children and too ridiculous for adults."

Desson Howe of The Washington Post called the film "one of the weirdest, most depressing family films ever made" and wrote that "it's a bizarre hybrid of wet-nosed tear-jerker and adult psychodrama, with a bummer conclusion, and out-there Buddhist-lite themes about life beyond the grave, guaranteed to send kids sobbing into the night."

Kevin Thomas of the Los Angeles Times opined, "Maybe if Fluke, which might have been better as an animated feature, weren't such a lavish, big-deal production and closer to the modest level of the recent — and pleasant little — pig movie Gordy, it wouldn't seem so overwhelmingly, at times even laughably, foolish. The film's human actors acquit themselves admirably under the circumstances, but there's no question that the stars are Comet (as Fluke) and Barney (as Rumpo), bolstered by excellent trainers and special-effects personnel."

Emanuel Levy of Variety stated, "The adventure doesn't pander to kids, though toward the end it gets overly emotional, milking every situation with lengthy reaction shots and cute closeups of Fluke" and "all three adults — Modine, Travis and Stoltz — otherwise accomplished and attractive performers, assume secondary status to the gorgeous dog and his loyal benefactor, Pomeranc."

Lisa Schwarzbaum of Entertainment Weekly gave the film a grade of "D" and commented, "With the exception of the cheek-pinchable Pomeranc, the cast gives performances as bewildered as the plot is bewildering. There is, though, one other star: The dog is great."

=== Accolades ===
Year	Award	Category	Recipient	Result
1996	22nd Saturn Awards	Best Fantasy Film	Fluke	Nominated
1996	22nd Saturn Awards	Best Performance by a Younger Actor	Max Pomeranc	Nominated
