= '48 (novel) =

1996 novel by James Herbert

- First edition
- Author: James Herbert
- Language: English
- Genre: Alternative history
- Published: 1996 (HarperCollins)
- Publication place: United Kingdom
- Media type: Print (Paperback & Hardback)
- Pages: 330 pp (first edition, paperback)
- ISBN: 0-00-647600-7 (first edition, paperback)
- OCLC: 37369859

'48 is a 1996 alternative history novel by British horror author James Herbert. The book follows an American pilot stranded in a dystopian London after Adolf Hitler, moments before being completely defeated, uses a biological weapon delivered by V-2 missiles, which mostly wipes out the human race.

== Plot summary ==
The story follows an American pilot, Hoke, who lives alone in the streets, constantly hidden and on the run from a gang of diseased and terminal Blackshirts, afflicted with the 'Slow Death', who attempt to capture him to use his blood to save their leader, Lord Hubble, via a blood transfusion.

Desperate to capture Hoke as his life draws nearer to its end, Hubble sends his entire force out to capture the American pilot. Hoke escapes thanks to the aid of three fellow 'ABneg' survivors – two women and a German navigator, shot down over Britain long ago.

Hoke, being used to three years alone, detests his saviours and, corrupted by propaganda, is almost unable to contain himself in the presence of the German even though the war has long since ended.

== Disease ==
With the V-2 missiles came two types of the same disease. First is the Blood Death which kills the subject instantly in a gruesome way. The arteries become blocked and explode, the skin splits and blood pours from every orifice. The Slow Death has the same climax but takes longer to work, up to years, and weakens the subject, blackens their fingers and hands and bruises their body internally. Victims of the Slow Death are generally much weaker and slower to react than the AB negs, however some individuals (such as McGruder, Hubble's bodyguard) seem less prone to its debilitating effects.

== Characters ==
- Eugene Nathaniel Hoke is an American pilot who volunteered for the war before America itself did. He is a loner at heart, likes to fend for himself and is affected grossly by military propaganda against the Germans as shown by his attitude to a fellow survivor.
- Cagney is a dog who formed a strong alliance with Hoke after Hoke saved his life and fed him. Cagney acts as a guard dog but also knows when to retreat from extreme danger. It is often Cagney who warns Hoke of approaching danger with a low growl or change in mood.
- Wilhelm Stern is a German navigator apparently shot down and imprisoned at Island Farm POW camp in Wales. He claims this is his only experience of the war and constantly tries to neutralize Hoke from the propaganda. It is later revealed that Stern was a German spy during the war. His plane crashed in 1944, but he managed to escape the blaze.
- Cissie is a poor girl of Cockney descent who befriended Muriel in a medical research hospital after the V-2 missiles struck. After many of the doctors fell dead of the Blood Death and hope of a cure faded, Cissie ran away with Muriel. Cissie is described as slightly rounder than Muriel but more Hoke's taste. However, her foul language shocks Hoke on more than one occasion.
- Muriel Drake is a rich girl who contrasts with Cissie in background but share a strong bond from when they met. She is described as more beautiful than Cissie and claims to feel spiritual presence several times suggesting that she has medium properties in her. It later transpires that she has been allied with the Blackshirts all along, due to a friendship between Hubble and her deceased father.
- Albert Potter, an old air raid warden who has been carrying on his duties even after the Blood Death and seems to not realize the war is over. He is described as slightly insane but harmless and loves to talk of himself and his achievements proudly.
- Lord Hubble, a victim of the Slow Death and tries desperately to capture Hoke, believing the pilot is the only Blood Death survivor, so that he can perform a foolish blood transfusion in hope that he can live on, free of the Slow Death. He is the leader of the Blackshirts, all who seem intent on following him to the grave. Hubble is also said to have ties with Hitler during the war.

== See also ==
- Axis victory in World War II
