= Nowhere to Hide (1994 film) =

- Film Poster
- Genre: Drama; Thriller
- Written by: Dan Gordon
- Directed by: Bobby Roth
- Starring: Rosanna Arquette; Scott Bakula; Max Pomeranc; Clifton Powell
- Music by: Gary Chang
- Country of origin: United States
- Original language: English

Production
- Executive producer: Stan Rogow
- Producer: Kedren Werner
- Cinematography: Shelly Johnson
- Editor: Henk Van Eeghen
- Running time: 96 minutes
- Production companies: Paramount Television; Stan Rogow Productions

Original release
- Network: ABC
- Release: October 9, 1994

Nowhere to Hide is a 1994 American made-for-television drama film starring Rosanna Arquette and Scott Bakula. The movie was written by Dan Gordon and directed by Bobby Roth.

== Plot ==
A woman in a witness protection program falls in love with the agent charged with protecting her. The agent turns out to be someone hired by her soon-to-be-ex-husband to make it look as if she is on the run so that he can defame her in court in order to get custody of their son.

== Cast ==
- Rosanna Arquette as Sarah Blake
- Scott Bakula as Kevin Nicholas
- Max Pomeranc as Sam Blake
- Clifton Powell as Braddock
- Robert Wisden
- Jenny Gago
- Jerry Wasserman
- Jill Teed
- Chris Mulkey
- Laurie Paton
- Nancy McClure
- Peter Lecriox
- Jill Teed
- DeeJay Jackson.
- Richmond Arquette
