= Tim White (artist) =

British painter (1952–2020)

Tim White (4 April 1952 – 6 April 2020) was a British painter, best known for his science fiction and fantasy book covers, record covers and magazine illustrations. He also designed jewellery to complement some of his paintings.

== Life and work ==
White was born in Erith, Kent, on 4 April 1952. After getting his A-levels he studied at the Medway College of Art between 1968 and 1972, selling his first poster design by the age of twenty. Following this, he spent two years working for various advertising studios, until he received his first book cover commission in 1974, for Arthur C Clarke's The Other Side of the Sky. He later provided covers for authors including Robert A. Heinlein, Frank Herbert, August Derleth, H. P. Lovecraft, Piers Anthony and Bruce Sterling.

The first collection of his work, The Science Fiction and Fantasy World of Tim White, was published in 1981 by New English Library, and reprinted by Paper Tiger Books in 1988. A second collection, Chiaroscuro, came out the same year.. Mouches (1983) was a wordless graphic novel. White also produced album covers and designed film sets. When he started creating jewellery based on his graphic works, he registered with the assay office in London; all his jewellery carries his personal assay mark.

According to The Encyclopedia of Science Fiction, White had become "relatively inactive since the year 2000". He died on 6 April 2020.

== Style ==
In A Biographical Dictionary of Science Fiction and Fantasy Artists, Robert Weinberg says, "White combines superlative detail with a largely figurative approach to his work and creates a totally realistic image of his landscape of the imagination." The Encyclopedia of Science Fiction says, "White has been celebrated as a representative of a new school of super-realists that began shaping British [science fiction] art in the mid-1970s".

White was notable for incorporating mock-photographic techniques in his painted work, such as depth of field and motion blur. His favoured medium was gouache.

== Selected works ==
- The Science Fiction and Fantasy World of Tim White (1981)
- Mouches (1983)
- Chiaroscuro (1988)
- Mirror of Dreams (1994)
