= The Rats (video game) =

1985 video game

- Commodore 64 title screen
- Developer: GXT (Five Ways Software)
- Publisher: Hodder & Stoughton
- Platforms: ZX Spectrum, Commodore 64
- Release: 1985
- Genre: Interactive fiction
- Mode: Single-player

The Rats is a survival horror text adventure for the Commodore 64 and ZX Spectrum computers. It is based on the 1974 novel The Rats by James Herbert. The game was programmed by GXT (Five Ways Software), and published by Hodder & Stoughton, who were the publishers of James Herbert's book The Rats. An Amstrad CPC version was planned, but was never released.

== Gameplay ==
The game is a simulation that allows the player to strategically send emergency forces (rat exterminators, police men, fire men and eventually army troops) to areas where the rat threat has spread and provide them with equipment. Also the player can get ten available researchers to develop addition weapons, defences and super weapons to keep the rats at bay and to provide useful information to progress in the game. Should the rat threat reach beyond the London limits, the Research centre, the Government centre or Harris' apartment or if all emergency forces are lost, the game is over.

In between the simulation gameplay, the game suddenly switches to the role of a playable character in a randomly chosen text adventure scenario. The player has to select one or more verbal options to perform actions to allow the character to survive against the rat threat and avoid getting killed. While it is not crucial to keep the characters alive, saving them grants the player additional reinforcements and research to aid against the rat threat. However, if one of the main characters Harris, Howard or Foskins dies, the game is over.

== Reception ==
Reception

Review scores
| Publication | Score |
|---|---|
| Crash | 70%(ZX); 7/10 (ZX) |
| Computer and Video Games | 6/10(C64) |
| Eurogamer | 9/10(C64) |
| Sinclair User | 5/5(ZX) |
| Zzap!64 | 79%(C64) |
| Computer Gamer | 13/20(C64) |
| ZX Computing | 5/5(ZX) |
| Popular Computing Weekly | 4/5(ZX) |

The ZX Spectrum version of The Rats was well-received on release in 1985, gaining a 5-star rating in Sinclair User, a 4-star rating in Popular Computing Weekly, and a 5-star rating in ZX Computing. Crash awarded it 70% in its "Frontline" strategy section, giving the gameplay element 90% but marking the game down over issues to do with the loading sequence. It awarded it 7/10 in its "Adventure Trail" section of the same issue, again marking the game down for its loading sequence, but unlike the review in the strategy section, also for the gameplay.

The Commodore 64 version had mixed reviews, with a 79% in Zzap!64, 6/10 in Computer and Video Games, and 13/20 in Computer Gamer. Eurogamer published a retro game review on the C64 version in 2007, giving it 9/10.

In Video Games Around the World, The Rats is described as one of the first horror games, being games that seek to frighten players.
