= Journey (1995 film) =

- Genre: Drama
- Based on: Journey by Patricia MacLachlan
- Written by: Patrica MacLachlan
- Directed by: Tom McLoughlin
- Starring: Jason Robards; Brenda Fricker; Meg Tilly
- Music by: Patrick Williams
- Country of origin: United States
- Original language: English

Production
- Executive producers: Glenn Close; Richard Welsh
- Producer: Brent Shields
- Cinematography: Kees Van Oostrum
- Editor: Scott Vickrey
- Running time: 96 minutes
- Production company: Hallmark Hall of Fame Productions

Original release
- Network: CBS
- Release: December 10, 1995

Related
- Redwood Curtain; The Boys Next Door

Journey is a 1995 American Hallmark Hall of Fame made-for-television drama film directed by Tom McLoughlin and starring Jason Robards, Brenda Fricker and Meg Tilly. The film aired on CBS on December 10, 1995.

== Plot ==
Jason Robards and Brenda Fricker starring as grandparents Marcus and Lottie who pick-up the pieces left behind by their restless daughter Min (Meg Tilly). When Min deserted her children and the family farm, her son Journey (Max Pomeranc) has nothing left but confusion. Despite gentle wisdom and help from his older sister Cat (Eliza Dushku), Journey cannot understand why his beloved family doesn't always live up to his expectations. Using his love of photography, Marcus recaptures Journey's past, and through love and determination, helps him understand that family is really just people who love you.

== Cast ==
- Jason Robards as Marcus
- Brenda Fricker as Lottie
- Max Pomeranc as Journey
- Eliza Dushku as Cat
- Meg Tilly as Min
- Jason Dohring as Cooper McDougall
- Frances Conroy as Fiona
