= The Survivor (1981 film) =

1981 Australian film by David Hemmings

- Theatrical film poster
- Directed by: David Hemmings
- Screenplay by: David Ambrose
- Based on: The Survivor by James Herbert
- Produced by: Antony I. Ginnane
- Starring: Robert Powell; Jenny Agutter; Angela Punch McGregor; Peter Sumner; Joseph Cotten
- Cinematography: John Seale
- Edited by: Tony Paterson
- Music by: Brian May
- Production companies: Tuesday Films; Riaci Investments; Pact Productions
- Distributed by: GUO Film Distributors
- Release date: 9 July 1981 (Australia)
- Running time: 100 minutes
- Country: Australia
- Language: English
- Budget: A$1.2 million
- Box office: US$700,000 (international) (est.)

The Survivor is a 1981 Australian supernatural horror film directed by David Hemmings and starring Robert Powell, Jenny Agutter, and Joseph Cotten. The film follows an airline pilot who, after surviving a mysterious crash that killed all of his passengers, is contacted by a clairvoyant who claims to be in contact with the victims. It is based on the 1976 novel of the same name by James Herbert. This was Cotten's last appearance in a feature film.

== Plot ==
In Adelaide, Australia, airline pilot David Keller survives the crash of his Boeing 747-200, unhurt despite all of its 300 passengers dying in the accident. With no memories of the accident, he starts to suffer strange supernatural visions, guiding him to suspect that something happened in the crash and that the accident was not really an accident at all.

Back at home, Keller attempts to return to his normal life, but he is bothered by photographers who hope to sell pictures of him to the press. One of them, whom Keller assaults, returns home where his girlfriend begins to develop the photographs. The man witnesses a young girl in his yard, and follows her as she beckons to a nearby cemetery; he is perplexed as she seems to appear and disappear right before him. The apparition of the child reveals herself to be a victim of the plane crash by burn scars on her face, terrifying the photographer. He attempts to flee, but is cornered by the apparition on a set of train tracks, where he is killed by a passing railcar.

A vigil is held at the crash site, where a Catholic priest gives a sermon for the victims' families and others. After the vigil, Keller is approached by Hobbs, a clairvoyant who had witnessed the plane crash from the ground, and who claims to have been contacted by the spirits of the victims. Keller visits Hobbs at her home and rebuffs her, after which she attacks him and the two have a scuffle in which both seem to lose control of their bodies, experiencing the untethered emotions of the victims.

Later, Hobbs is impelled to visit the home of the photographer who was killed by the train. As Hobbs observes the house from outside, the photographer's girlfriend begins developing photographs in their dark room, only to find the photographs develop into disturbing portraits of the burned crash victims. The woman, attacked by supernatural forces, is chopped to death by a large paper cutter.

Hobbs brings Keller to visit with the Catholic priest before the two decide to return to the crash site. Hobbs brings Keller inside the plane wreckage, where she seats him in the intact cockpit. Keller begins to experience regressive memories of the events leading up to the crash, which entail a passenger finding a bomb on board the plane which subsequently detonated, causing the plane to lose control. Keller awakens from the vision and he and Hobbs flee the crash site. Tewson, one of Keller's peers investigating the crash, arrives shortly after and is stabbed to death by an unseen figure.

Utilizing Hobbs's psychic impressions, Keller drives around the city as she directs him. The two arrive at an aeroplane hangar to where some of the airplane sections have been moved. Keller finds Slater, one of his peers from the airline, armed with a shotgun. Slater admits to having planted the bomb on the aircraft, hoping to kill Keller so that he could wrangle further control of the airline, and for killing Tewson who was getting too close to the truth. Slater shows no remorse, deeming the 300 passengers as "nobodies". Slater apparently shoots Keller with the shotgun. Moments later, the screams of the victims fill the hangar, and one of the plane's engines suddenly bursts into flames, triggering an inferno. Hobbs watches from outside the hangar in horror as Slater stumbles out, engulfed in flames, eventually burning to death.

The following day, as the recovery crew prepares to haul away the cockpit portion of the crashed plane, they discover Keller's burnt corpse in the pilot's seat, in his flight uniform and having been dead for days.

== Cast ==
- Robert Powell as David Keller
- Jenny Agutter as Hobbs
- Joseph Cotten as Priest
- Angela Punch McGregor as Beth
- Peter Sumner as Tewson
- Lorna Lesley as Susan
- Ralph Cotterill as Slater
- Adrian Wright as Goodwin
- Tim Rice as Newscaster
- Tyler Coppin as Boy
- Edwin Hodgeman as Bain
- Roger Cardwell as Flight Engineer
- John Edmund as Goswell
- Brenton Whittle as Thornton

== Production ==
$350,000 of the budget was invested by the South Australian Film Corporation, with a similar amount coming from English investors. The rest came from Greater Union, a TV sale and private investment.

Prior to filming David Hemmings and Antony I. Ginnane discussed whether to make the film gory or more cerebral in the vein of The Innocents (1961). They chose the latter, a decision Ginnane later said was a mistake.

Ginnane asked Brian Trenchard-Smith to cut a ten-minute promotional reel for the film to entice potential buyers at the Milan Film Market before it had been finished. Because Jenny Agutter was scheduled to begin work on the film after the cut-off date from which Trenchard-Smith could draw material from the film's dailies, he shot his own material with her exclusively for the reel. He later cut the trailer for the actual film when it was released.

== Reception ==
James Herbert, who wrote the novel upon which the film was based, described the film as "terrible ... absolute rubbish."

=== Accolades ===
Award	Category	Subject	Result
AACTA Awards (1981 AFI Awards)	Best Actress	Jenny Agutter	Nominated
AACTA Awards (1981 AFI Awards)	Best Cinematography	John Seale	Nominated
AACTA Awards (1981 AFI Awards)	Best Sound	Peter Fenton	Nominated
AACTA Awards (1981 AFI Awards)	Best Sound	Tim Lloyd	Nominated
AACTA Awards (1981 AFI Awards)	Best Production Design	Bernard Hides	Nominated
Sitges Film Festival	Medalla Sitges for Best Screenplay	David Ambrose	Won
Sitges Film Festival	Prize of the International Critics' Jury	David Hemmings	Won

== Home media ==
Flashback Entertainment released a DVD transfer of the film in Australia, Cat no. 26675.

== See also ==
- Cinema of Australia
