= The Rats (novel) =

1974 horror novel by James Herbert

- First edition
- Author: James Herbert
- Genre: Horror
- Publisher: New English Library
- Publication date: 1974
- Publication place: United Kingdom
- Media type: Print (hardback and paperback)
- Pages: 181
- ISBN: 0-450-02127-0
- OCLC: 426457193
- Followed by: Lair

The Rats (1974) is a horror novel by British writer James Herbert. This was Herbert's first novel and included graphic depictions of death and mutilation.

== Plot ==
The novel opens by introducing an alcoholic vagrant, resting by a canal. He is suddenly set upon by a pack of black rats, which are the size of small dogs, and is devoured alive.

Harris, a young East London art teacher, learns that one of his students was attacked by a rat. Meanwhile, a baby girl and her dog are killed by the rats, now aided by packs of smaller rats. The girl's mother rescues her daughter's mutilated body, but not before sustaining bites as well. Harris takes his student to the hospital and sees the mother with her dead child. According to the doctor, the number of seemingly unprovoked rat attacks has strangely increased. The next attack occurs at the remains of a bombsite, where a group of vagrants are slaughtered.

Harris is visited at work by the Minister of Health, Mr. Foskins, who reveals that the bitten student, along with all other surviving victims of rat attacks, has died of a mysterious disease twenty-four hours after being bitten. Foskins asks Harris to lead an exterminator named Ferris to the area where the student had been bitten. Harris and Ferris go to the canal and sight a group of giant rats; Ferris follows and is killed by the rats.

The attacks become increasingly more daring, as more public places are attacked. A tube station is assaulted, leaving few survivors. Harris' own school is attacked, resulting in the death of the headmaster. With the existence of the disease now public knowledge, a meeting is held in which a researcher, Stephen Howard, comes up with the idea of using a virus to infect the rats. The virus is injected into several puppies, which are left in areas of the attacks. This results in the deaths of thousands of rats, which crawl to the surface to die.

However, after a few weeks, the rats adapt to the virus, losing the toxicity of their bites. They brutally attack a cinema and overrun the London Zoo. Based on the fact that rats communicate with each other using ultrasound, a plan is formulated to use ultrasonic machines to lure them into poison gas chambers.

Foskins is dismissed as Health Minister and reveals to Harris that he has been investigating the rats' origins; they were illegally smuggled into the country by a zoologist named William Bartlett Schiller from an island near New Guinea, close to the site of nuclear tests. At his home by an East London canal, Schiller had bred these mutant rats with common black rats, producing a new and deadly strain. They later killed Schiller and escaped. Pursuing the disgraced Foskins past waves of entranced rats, Harris finds Schiller's abandoned house and goes into the cellar. He finds Foskins' corpse being devoured by rats of unusually great size. He kills them and discovers the rats' alpha; a white, hairless obese rat with two heads. Harris kills the creature with an axe in a fit of rage.

The epilogue indicates that one female rat survived the purge by being trapped in the basement of a grocery shop. It gives birth to a new litter, including a new white two-headed rat.

== Background ==
Herbert became inspired to write The Rats in early 1972, while watching Tod Browning's Dracula; specifically, after seeing the scene in which Renfield describes his recurring nightmare about hordes of rats. Linking the film to childhood memories he had of rats in London's East End, Herbert stated in later interviews that he wrote the book primarily as a pastime: "It seemed like a good idea at the time, I was as naive as that." The manuscript was typed by Herbert's wife Eileen, who sent it off after nine months to nine different publishers.

== Reception ==
The first paperback edition sold out after three weeks. The Rats received harsh criticism upon its publication. It was deemed to be far too graphic in its portrayals of death and mutilation, and the social commentary regarding the neglect of London's suburbs was said to be too extreme. For some reviewers, the novel was not literature, and not a good example of good writing. However, many consider the novel to be social commentary influenced by Herbert's harsh upbringing in immediate post-war London. Ramsey Campbell lauded the novel, saying "The Rats announces at once that he (Herbert) won't be confined by the conventions of English macabre fiction." Campbell praised the use of the theme of "Original Sin" in The Rats, saying "that the book can discuss its underlying themes so directly without becoming pretentious...is one of Herbert's strengths." Campbell also defended Herbert's use of violence and indigence as both integral to The Rats' plot, and a break from the clichés of the horror fiction of that time period.

The underlying theme of the novel is the lack of care by the government toward the underclass and a lack of reaction to a tragedy until it is already too late. Fellow author Peter James stated "I think Jim reinvented the horror genre and brought it into the modern world. He set a benchmark with his writing that many writers subsequently have tried, without success, to emulate."

== Sequels and adaptations ==
The Rats was followed by three sequels, Lair (1979), Domain (1984) and The City (1993; the last one was a graphic novel). All three books were sold as a trilogy and were very well received by the public and horror fans.

An Americanised film adaptation was made in 1982, titled Deadly Eyes. A 1985 adventure game for the Commodore 64 and ZX Spectrum based on the book was published by Hodder & Stoughton Ltd and produced by GXT (Five Ways Software).
