= Out of the Dark (2014 film) =

2014 film

- Promotional release poster
- Directed by: Lluís Quílez
- Written by: Alex Pastor; David Pastor; Javier Gullón
- Produced by: Belén Atienza; Cristian Conti; Enrique López Lavigne; Andrés Calderón
- Starring: Julia Stiles; Scott Speedman; Stephen Rea
- Production companies: Participant Media; Imagenation Abu Dhabi; Exclusive Media; Apaches Entertainment; Cactus Flower; Fast Producciones; Dynamo; XYZ Films (Note: The Hollywood Reporter says, "Out of the Dark will be presented by Vertical in association with Participant Media and Image Nation. It is a production of Apaches Entertainment, Cactus Flower and Fast Producciones in association with Dynamo and XYZ Films.")
- Distributed by: Vertical Entertainment (United States)
- Release date: August 27, 2014 (Fantasy Filmfest)
- Running time: 92 minutes
- Countries: Colombia; Spain
- Languages: English; Spanish; Koreguaje
- Budget: US$10 million

Out of the Dark (Spanish: Aguas rojas) is a 2014 English-language supernatural thriller film starring Julia Stiles, Scott Speedman, and Stephen Rea. The independent Spanish-Colombian co-production is directed by Lluís Quílez based on a screenplay by Alex Pastor, David Pastor, and Javier Gullón. Filming took place in Colombia between April 2013 and July 2013, after which it entered post-production. The film premiered at Germany's Fantasy Filmfest on August 27, 2014.

== Plot ==
In 1992, Dr. Andres Contreras Sr. prepares to abandon a finca in Santa Clara, Colombia. As he attempts to burn a number of files, he hears noises around the house and hastily stashes them in the dumbwaiter. On the second floor, he is chased by what appears to be a group of children and falls to his death after being pushed from the balcony.

Twenty years later, Sarah and Paul Harriman move from the UK to Santa Clara with their daughter, Hannah. Sarah is set to become the new manager of a paper mill owned by her father, Jordan. They move into the finca, which belongs to the company. While the small family adores their new home, Hannah is unsettled by the open dumbwaiter in the wall of her room.

Shortly after their arrival, Sarah and Paul attend a dinner on the opening night of the Los Niños Santos festival, leaving Hannah in the care of her nanny, Catalina. Strange occurrences happen around the finca, and a sleeping Hannah is awakened when the dumbwaiter door suddenly opens. Seeing her favorite stuffed toy inside, she climbs in to retrieve it, only to become trapped.

Arriving home, Sarah and Paul discover Hannah is ill and developing a rash. Catalina uneasily mentions that she believes there is a ghost in the house, prompting Paul to fire her. Over the following day, Hannah's condition worsens, and her rash becomes more severe. Concerned, the couple agrees to take her back to the UK for proper medical care.

That night, as a storm brews, children wearing stained and dirty bandages appear and kidnap Hannah, carrying her away into the jungle. The police are skeptical of Sarah and Paul's account, and a frustrated Paul, desperate for answers, searches for Catalina.

Catalina takes Paul to the church, where he sees one of the children and follows the boy to a shanty house. There, he meets the parents of a child who mysteriously vanished 20 years ago. Before his disappearance, the boy exhibited the same symptoms as Hannah.

Meanwhile, Sarah notices a drawing Hannah made of the dumbwaiter and decides to investigate. When she falls to the bottom of the shaft, she discovers files on several children who died from mercury poisoning.

Separately, Sarah and Paul make their way to the old paper mill, where they reunite and search for Hannah. Jordan joins them in the search, crawling through a pipe, only to be confronted by the children, who begin removing the bandages covering their burn-like rashes. They attack him for concealing their deaths instead of informing the police and their families. As he struggles, Jordan catches sight of Hannah and tries to reach her.

Cradling his granddaughter, Jordan watches as trickles of mercury seep from her rashes and are absorbed into his body. Surrounded by the children, with mercury streaming from their bodies, he succumbs and dies. Hannah then awakens, now healthy, in her mother's arms.

During the credits, children play at a school named after the shanty town where the missing children once lived. Hannah is now a student, and Catalina is a teacher.

== Cast ==
- Julia Stiles as Sarah Harriman
- Scott Speedman as Paul Harriman
- Stephen Rea as Jordan
- Pixie Davies as Hannah Harriman
- Alejandro Furth as Dr. Andres Contreras Jr.
- Guillermo Morales Vitola

== Production ==
Out of the Dark is directed by Lluís Quílez based on a screenplay by Alex Pastor, David Pastor, and Javier Gullón. The film is a Spanish-Colombian co-production. Out of the Dark is Colombia-based Dynamo's first English-language production. Participant Media fully financed the production, which has a budget of under US$10 million after subsidies and tax breaks from the production companies' countries. Filming began in Bogotá, Colombia in late April 2013. By July 2013, the film entered post-production.

== Release ==
In November 2013, Exclusive Media acquired international rights to sell Out of the Dark. The film premiered at Germany's Fantasy Filmfest on August 27, 2014. Vertical Entertainment released the film in a limited theatrical screening on February 27, 2015 the United States.

== Reception ==
Rotten Tomatoes, a review aggregator, reports that 24% of 21 surveyed critics gave the film a positive review; the average rating is 4.5/10. Metacritic rated it 33/100 based on nine critics, indicating "generally unfavorable reviews". Dennis Harvey of Variety said that it "offers professional polish but no interesting ideas or atmospherics". Frank Scheck of The Hollywood Reporter wrote, "The by-then-numbers thriller features the usual genre tropes, with a particular emphasis on placing its youngest main character in constant jeopardy." Jeannette Catsoulis of The New York Times called it "derivative and devoid of tension". Robert Abele of the Los Angeles Times wrote that it is "a movie lovely to look at but on-the-nose and crushingly dull". Chris Packham of The Village Voice wrote, "Stylishly filmed and often scary, Out of the Dark unspools a conclusion as conventional and button-down as a wide tie knot and a pair of wingtips." Michael Gingold of Fangoria rated it 2/4 stars and wrote that the film "is content to go through its good-looking motions without offering the audience much that’s fresh". Patrick Cooper of Bloody Disgusting rated it 2/5 stars and wrote that it has "remarkable photography and palpable atmosphere" but is too predictable. Matt Boiselle of Dread Central rated it 1.5/5 stars and called it a boring film with a lackluster conclusion.

== See also ==
- List of Spanish films of 2014
- List of films depicting Colombia
