= Pixie Davies =

British actress

- Born: 9 December 2006 (age 19); England
- Education: Sylvia Young Theatre School
- Occupation: Actress
- Years active: 2012–present

Pixie Love Davies (born 9 December 2006) is a British actress. Born and raised in England, she began her career in 2012, starring in the BBC's The Secret of Crickley Hall. After making her film debut in Nativity 2: Danger in the Manger (2012), she appeared in several other features, including Out of the Dark (2014) and Miss Peregrine's Home for Peculiar Children (2016). In 2018, she had her breakout role as Annabel Banks in Disney's Mary Poppins Returns. Davies also voiced Adel in Netflix's The Magician's Elephant.

== Life and career ==
Pixie Love Davies was born and raised in England and trained at the Sylvia Young Theatre School. Davies played her first role in 2012 as Cally Caleigh, the youngest daughter, in the BBC's television drama The Secret of Crickley Hall. Her performance was well received by critics; for example, GamesRadar+ called her great, favourably stating that while she was humorous, she "never seem[ed] precocious". In the same year, Davies made her film debut in comedy film Nativity 2: Danger in the Manger. She then performed in guest roles before playing Hannah Harriman in Out of the Dark at age seven. While the film was generally negatively received, Davies' performance garnered praise. RogerEbert.com said, "Davies is cute enough, she understandably doesn't have much range beyond pouting, and smiling."

In 2016, she played the role of Bronwyn Bruntley, a girl who possesses superhuman strength, in Tim Burton's film adaptation of Miss Peregrine's Home for Peculiar Children. The film was released on 30 September 2016, and received generally favourable reviews from critics. Writing for Common Sense Media, S. Jhoanna Robledo called the cast "pretty strong". In 2018, Davies played her breakout role as Annabel Banks in Mary Poppins sequel, Mary Poppins Returns. The film grossed $349.5 million at the box office and was complimented by critics. The child performances garnered critical acclaim. Rachit Gupta of The Times of India called them "perfectly cute" and The Hollywood Reporter's David Rooney wrote that they were exemplary. For their work, she and the cast of Mary Poppins Returns received an Ensemble Cast Award at the 2019 Palm Springs International Film Festival. In 2020, Davies was announced to have joined the cast of Netflix animated film The Magician's Elephant. She voices Adel, the long-lost sister of protagonist Peter.

== Filmography ==
Year	Title	Role	Notes
2012	The Secret of Crickley Hall	Cally Caleigh	TV mini-series
2012	Nativity 2: Danger in the Manger	Pixie	
2013	The White Queen	Princess Elizabeth	TV mini-series
2014	Utopia	Amanda	Episode: 2.2
2014	Out of the Dark	Hannah Harriman	
2014	Nativity 3: Dude, Where's My Donkey?	Pixie	
2015	Esio Trot	Roberta	TV film
2015–2018	Humans	Sophie Hawkins	TV series, 3 series
2016	Miss Peregrine's Home for Peculiar Children	Bronwyn Bruntley	
2018	Mary Poppins Returns	Annabel Banks	Won an Ensemble Cast Award at 2019 Palm Springs International Film Festival
2019–2020	101 Dalmatian Street	Big Fee, Razzi the Rat, Puppy Ensemble (voice)	Recurring
2023	The Magician's Elephant	Adel (voice)	
2023–present	Castlevania: Nocturne	Maria Renard (voice)	
2025	Unforgotten	Taylor Cooper	
