= Max Pomeranc =

American child actor (born 1984)

- Born: March 21, 1984 (age 41); New York City
- Occupation: Actor
- Years active: 1993–1995, 2008

Max Pomeranc (born March 21, 1984) is an American former child actor.

Pomeranc was born in New York City, New York. His mother, Marion Hess Pomeranc, is an author, and his father, Abe Pomeranc, is a stock broker. He made his acting debut at the age of eight, playing the lead in the film Searching for Bobby Fischer, based on the childhood of International Master Josh Waitzkin. At the time Pomeranc appeared in the film, he was also one of the U.S.'s top 20 chess players in his age group. Pomeranc next starred in the 1995 family movie Fluke.

== Filmography ==
=== Film ===
| Year | Title | Role | Notes |
|---|---|---|---|
| 1993 | Searching for Bobby Fischer | Joshua Waitzkin | |
| 1994 | Nowhere to Hide | Sam Blake | TV movie |
| 1995 | Fluke | Brian Johnson | |
| 1995 | Journey | Journey | TV movie |
| 2008 | Definitely, Maybe | Robredo Campaign Worker | |

=== Television ===
| Year | Title | Role | Notes |
|---|---|---|---|
| 1993 | John & Leeza from Hollywood | Self | Episode: "Episode #1.43" |

== Awards ==
| Year | Result | Award | Category | Work |
|---|---|---|---|---|
| 1993 | Won | Special Mention | For a talent of the future | Searching for Bobby Fischer |
| 1994 | Nominated | Young Artist Award | Best Actor Under Ten in a Motion Picture | Searching for Bobby Fischer |
| 1996 | Nominated | Saturn Award | Best Performance by a Younger Actor | Fluke |
