= The Secret of Crickley Hall =

2006 novel by James Herbert

- Author: James Herbert
- Language: English
- Genre: Supernatural Horror
- Publisher: Pan Books
- Publication date: October 2006
- Publication place: United Kingdom
- Media type: Print (Hardcover, Paperback)
- Pages: 634
- ISBN: 978-0330411684
- OCLC: 77540667

The Secret of Crickley Hall is a 2006 supernatural thriller novel by the British writer James Herbert.

== Synopsis ==
=== 2006 ===
Gabe Caleigh, his wife Eve, and their children, Loren, Cameron and Cally, live in London. One day Cameron goes missing when Eve falls asleep for a few seconds at a playground and he simply disappears. Eleven months later, Gabe is offered a short-term contract of employment on the coast. Anxious for his wife, he suggests that a relocation over the period of the anniversary could help the whole family.

On arriving at Crickley Hall, they meet Percy Judd who worked there during the war; he seems concerned for their children. They start to settle in but before long, strange things start to happen at the house. They hear people, Cally claims to have been hit by a man with a cane and their dog runs away in terror. In the house Eve hears her missing son's voice for the first time in a year. He says he is alive and the children can tell her where he is. After Loren suffers a terrifyingly real nightmare where she gets whipped by the man with the cane, Gabe wants them all to leave, but Eve can't bear to abandon her son.

=== 1943 ===
63 years earlier, Crickley Hall is an orphanage for children evacuated from the Blitz. Nancy is interviewed for the position of ‘tutor’ by Magda, sister of Augustus Cribben who runs the orphanage. Nancy meets the children, including six-year-old Stefan, a Polish refugee, and twelve-year-old Maurice, the class sneak. Cribben keeps in the shadows – he has not been the same since he was injured in the Blitz. Nancy suspects the orphans are being mistreated, especially Stefan. When Nancy finally meets Cribben, she is appalled by a man who seems out of control. She tries to rescue the orphans but is fired, and no one believes her apart from young Percy, who is about to be called up to war.

== Setting ==
The village of Hollow Bay in The Secret Of Crickley Hall is based on Lynmouth in Exmoor National Park, Devon; Devil's Cleave is the East Lyn Valley and Watersmeet. The book brings together two stories, child evacuees during the Second World War and the 1952 flood disaster that devastated Lynmouth.

== Television adaptation ==
A three-part serial was broadcast weekly on BBC One from 18 November 2012.
