= James Herbert =

English horror writer (1943–2013)

James Herbert OBE
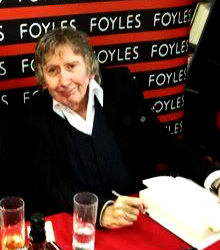
- James Herbert in September 2012
- Born: 8 April 1943; London, England
- Died: 20 March 2013 (aged 69); Sussex, England
- Occupation: Writer
- Writing career
- Period: 1974–2012
- Genres: Horror, dark fantasy, thriller, science fiction
- Notable works: The Rats series, The Fog

James John Herbert, OBE (8 April 1943 – 20 March 2013) was an English horror writer. A full-time writer, he also designed his own book covers and publicity. His books have sold 54 million copies worldwide, and have been translated into 34 languages, including Chinese and Russian.

== Biography ==
Born in London, Herbert was the son of Herbert Herbert, a stall-holder at London's Brick Lane Market. He attended a Catholic school in Bethnal Green called Our Lady of the Assumption, then at 11 won a scholarship to St Aloysius Grammar School in Highgate. He left school at 15 and studied at Hornsey College of Art, joining the art department of John Collings, a small advertising agency. He left the agency to join Charles Barker Advertising where he worked as art director and then group head.

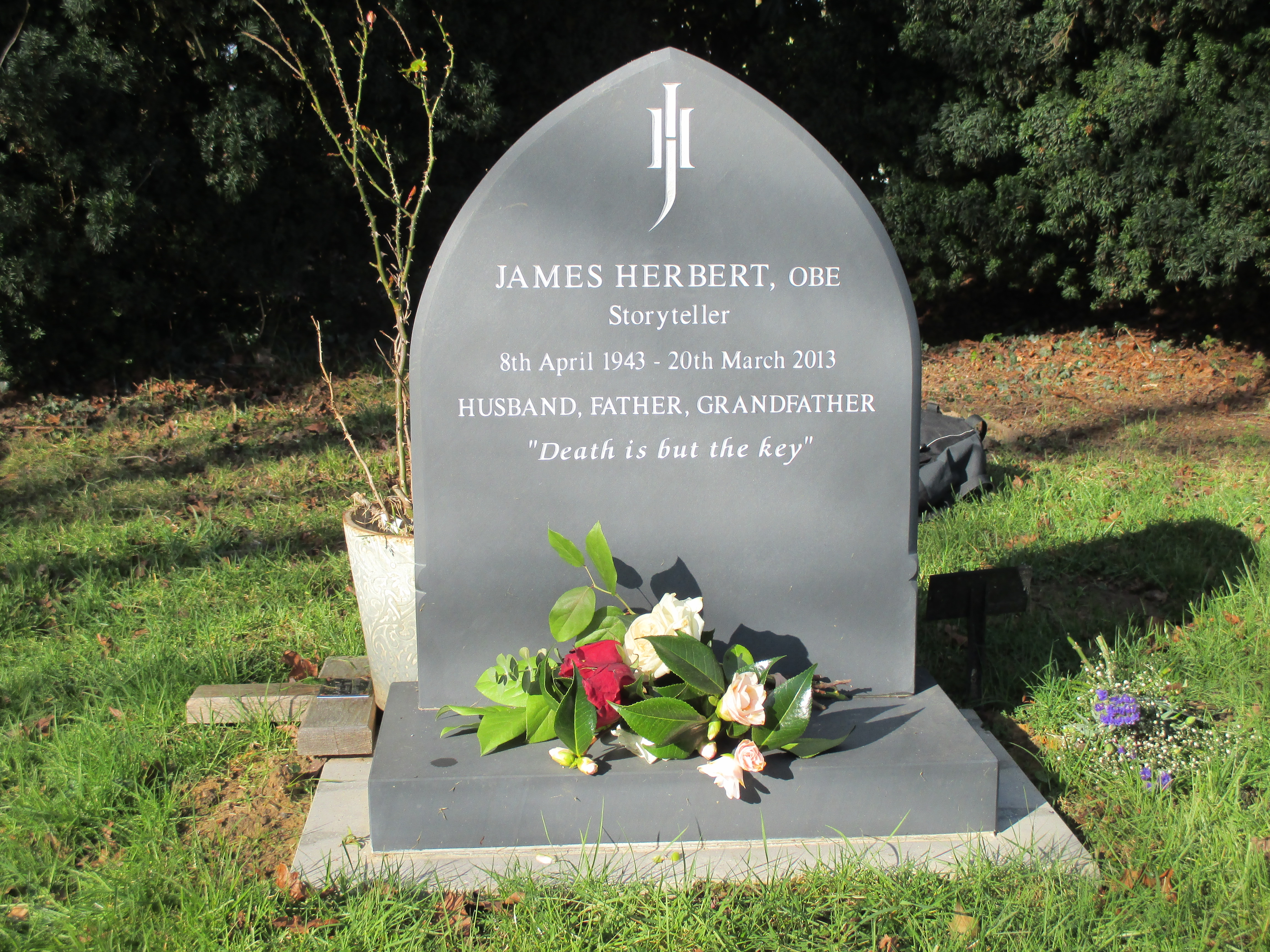
James Herbert's gravestone in the churchyard of St. Peter's, Woodmancote, West Sussex

Herbert lived in Woodmancote, near Henfield in West Sussex. He had two brothers: Peter, a retired market trader and John, an insurance broker. Herbert would write his drafts in longhand on "jumbo pads". In 1979 Herbert had to pay damages when it was ruled that he had based part of his novel The Spear on the work of another writer, The Spear of Destiny by Trevor Ravenscroft. In 2010 Herbert was honoured with the World Horror Convention Grand Master Award, presented to him by Stephen King. Later in the same year, he was appointed an Officer of the Order of the British Empire (OBE) in the 2010 Birthday Honours, presented by Prince Charles.

On 20 March 2013, Herbert died suddenly at his home in Sussex at the age of 69. No cause of death was given and a spokeswoman for the publisher said that he had not been ill. He is survived by his wife, Eileen, and three daughters. His estate was valued at £8.3 million.

== Work ==
His first two books, The Rats and The Fog, were disaster novels with man-eating giant black rats in the first and an accidentally released chemical weapon in the second. The first print run of The Rats (100,000 copies) sold out in three weeks. Herbert wrote three sequels to The Rats: Lair, which deals with a second outbreak of the mutant black rats, this time in the countryside around Epping Forest rather than in the first book's London slums; in Domain, a nuclear war results in rats having become the dominant species in a devastated city; the third sequel, the graphic novel The City, is an adventure set in the post-nuclear future.

With his third novel, the ghost story The Survivor, Herbert used supernatural horror rather than the science fiction horror of his first two books. In Shrine, he explored his Roman Catholic heritage with the story of an apparent miracle which turns out to be something much more sinister. Haunted, the story of a sceptical paranormal investigator taunted by malicious ghosts, began life as a screenplay for the BBC, though this was not the screenplay used in the eventual film version. Its sequels were The Ghosts of Sleath and Ash. Others of Herbert's books, such as Moon, Sepulchre and Portent, are structured as thrillers and include espionage and detective story elements along with the supernatural. The Jonah is in large part the story of a police investigation, albeit by a policeman whose life is overshadowed by a supernatural presence. The Spear deals with a neo-Nazi cult in Britain and an international conspiracy which includes a right-wing US general and an arms dealer.

'48 is an alternative history novel set in 1948 in which the Second World War ended with the release of a devastating plague by the defeated Hitler and, like The Spear, features British characters who sympathise with the Nazis. Others narrates the story of a physically deformed private detective. Herbert had previously tackled the theme of reincarnation in his fourth novel, Fluke, the fantasy story of a dog who somehow remembers his previous life as a human being. Rumbo, one of the characters from Fluke also turns up in The Magic Cottage. Once... includes another reference to the character of Rumbo (along with an in-joke of elven folk having names of reversed titles of Herbert's previous novels; 'Hanoj', 'Niamod', 'Noom', etc.).

Nobody True continues the theme of life after death, being narrated by a ghost whose investigation of his own death results in the destruction of his illusions about his life. Herbert described Creed as his Abbott and Costello Meet Frankenstein. The character Joe Creed is a cynical, sleazy paparazzo who is drawn into a plot involving fed-up and underappreciated monsters.

The novel The Secret of Crickley Hall, originally scheduled for release in April 2006, was eventually released in October. A long novel about a haunted country house in England, it examined the relationship between religious zealotry and child abuse. One of the characters in this novel is named after a real person, who won the honour by having the winning bid in the 2004 BBC Radio 2 Children in Need Auction. Various biographical and critical pieces by and about Herbert have been collected in James Herbert: By Horror Haunted, edited by Stephen Jones, and also in James Herbert – Devil in the Dark, written by Craig Cabell.

Herbert released a new novel virtually every year from 1974 to 1988, wrote six novels during the 1990s and released three new works in the 2000s. "I am very insecure about being a writer", he stated in the book Faces of Fear. "I don't understand why I am so successful. And the longer I stay that way, the better it's going to be, because that's what keeps me on the edge, striving if you like."

Herbert's final novel has an eerie political edge. Ash imagines Princess Diana and her secret son as well as Lord Lucan, Colonel Gaddafi and Robert Maxwell living together in a Scottish castle.

He was the subject of a This is Your Life programme in 1995, when he was surprised by Michael Aspel at the London Dungeon.

== Reception ==
"Herbert was by no means literary, but his work had a raw urgency," said Stephen King. "His best novels, The Rats and The Fog, had the effect of Mike Tyson in his championship days: no finesse, all crude power. Those books were best sellers because many readers (including me) were too horrified to put them down."

"There are few things I would like to do less than lie under a cloudy night sky while someone read aloud the more vivid passages of Moon," Andrew Postman wrote in The New York Times Book Review. "In the thriller genre, do recommendations come any higher?"

== List of works ==
Novels

- The Rats (1974; first instalment in the Rats series)
- The Fog (1975)
- The Survivor (1976)
- Fluke (1977)
- The Spear (1978)
- Lair (1979; second instalment in the Rats series)
- The Dark (1980)
- The Jonah (1981)
- Shrine (1983)
- Domain (1984; third instalment in the Rats series)
- Moon (1985)
- The Magic Cottage (1986)
- Sepulchre (1987)
- Haunted (1988)
- Creed (1990)
- Portent (1992)
- The Ghosts of Sleath (1994)
- '48 (1996)
- Others (1999)
- Once (2001)
- Nobody True (2003)
- The Secret of Crickley Hall (2006)
- Ash (2012)

Graphic novel

- The City (1994; fourth instalment in the Rats series) (Note: Illustrated by Ian Miller.)

Non-fiction

- James Herbert: By Horror Haunted (1992) (Note: Collection of works and interviews, edited by Stephen Jones. See Jones 1992.)
- James Herbert's Dark Places (1993) (Note: Photographs by Paul Barkshire.)

Short stories

- "Maurice and Mog" (Note: "Maurice and Mog", about a man living in his nuclear shelter with a cat, was originally a chapter of Domain that was excised from some editions of the novel. In: Williamson 1987, 1988 & 2001 and Jones 1992.)
- "Breakfast" (Note: "Breakfast", about a woman who continues with her chores after Armageddon, was originally a chapter of Domain that was excised from some editions of the novel. In: Masterton 1989 and Jones 1992.)
- "Hallowe'en's Child" (Note: "Halloween's Child" was an original story first published in the Daily Mail. In Etchison 1991a & 1991b and Jones 1992.)
- "They Don't Like Us" (Note: "They Don't Like Us". In: Jones 1992 and Francis & Upton 1996.)
- "Extinct" (Note: "Extinct". In: Cabell 2003.)
- "Cora's Needs" (Note: "Cora's Needs" is the restoration of a chapter of Sepulchre that was edited down before publication. In: Cabell 2003.)

== Adaptations ==
- The Survivor (1981 film)
- Deadly Eyes (1982 film adapted from The Rats)
- The Rats (1985 computer game for the Commodore 64 and Sinclair Spectrum)
- Fluke (a 1991 five-part BBC Radio 4 reading; a 1995 film adaptation)
- Haunted (1995 film)
- The Magic Cottage (1998 BBC Radio 4 Dramatisation)
- The Secret of Crickley Hall (2012 three-part BBC One television serial)
- The Unholy (2021 film adapted from Shrine)

== See also ==
- List of horror fiction writers

== Sources ==
- Cabell, Craig (2003). James Herbert: Devil in the Dark. United Kingdom: John Blake Publishing. ISBN 978-1-84358-059-1.
- Etchison, Dennis, ed. (1991a). Masters of Darkness III. New York City: Tor Books. ISBN 978-0-8125-1766-8.
- Etchison, Dennis, ed. (1991b). The Complete Masters of Darkness. United States: Underwood-Miller. ISBN 978-0-88733-116-9.
- Francis, Clare; Upton, Ondine, eds. (1996). A Feast of Stories. London: Macmillan Publishers. ISBN 978-0-333-65340-1.
- Jones, Stephen, ed. (1992). James Herbert: By Horror Haunted. London: Hodder & Stoughton. ISBN 978-0-450-53810-0.
- Masterton, Graham, ed. (1989). Scare Care (Tor horror). New York City: St. Martin's Press. ISBN 978-0-312-93156-8.
- Williamson, J.N., ed. (1987). Masques II: All-New Stories of Horror and the Supernatural. Baltimore: Maclay & Assoc. ISBN 978-0-940776-24-1.
- Williamson, J.N., ed. (1988). The Best of Masques. New York City: Berkley Books. ISBN 978-0-425-10693-8.
- Williamson, J.N., ed. (2001). Dark Masques. New York City: Pinnacle Books. ISBN 978-0-7860-1455-2.
