= New English Library =

British book publishing company (1961–2004)

- Industry: Book publishing
- Predecessor: Ace Books Ltd; Four Square Books Ltd
- Founded: 1961 (65 years ago)
- Founder: Times Mirror Company
- Defunct: 2004 (22 years ago)
- Fate: Merged with Hodder & Stoughton
- Headquarters: , United Kingdom

The New English Library (NEL) was a British book publishing company which became an imprint of Hodder Headline.

== History ==
New English Library (NEL) was created in 1961 by the Times Mirror Company of Los Angeles, with the takeover of two small British paperback companies, Ace Books Ltd and Four Square Books Ltd, as a complement to its 1960 acquisition of New American Library in the United States. NEL's top bestseller of the 1960s was the novel The Carpetbaggers by Harold Robbins.

The imprint was sold in 1981 to Hodder & Stoughton, and became part of the merged Hodder Headline in 1993.

It has published genre fiction including westerns, science fiction, fantasy, historical novels, war fiction, romantic novels, mystery, crime and suspense. In addition to the works of Robbins, they have published the works of Stephen King, James Herbert and science-fiction authors have included Brian Aldiss, Frank Herbert, Robert A. Heinlein, Michael Moorcock and Christopher Priest.

New English Library titles were particularly popular in the early 1970s, when hack writers were hired to work under names including Richard Allen and Mick Norman to churn out tales of Hells Angels and skinheads. These older New English Library books have some cult following, especially in the U.K.

The brand continued as a mass-market imprint for Hodder Headline, focussing on thrillers and horror, until 2004 when it was dropped following Hodder's assimilation into the Hachette Livre group, and a single Hodder & Stoughton paperback list was created, combining the NEL titles then in print with those in Hodder's previous Coronet (mainstream) and Flame (young and contemporary) paperback lines.

== Book series ==
- Burke's Series
- The Carter Brown Mystery Series
- Dictionary of Battles series
- The Edge Series
- Four Square Adventures
- Four Square Gothic Mystery
- Four Square Library
- Four Square Classics
- Four Square Science Fiction
- The Great Histories
- History of Aviation Series
- The Island Guidebook Series
- NEL Mentor
- NEL Modern Classics
- NEL Paperbacks
- NEL SF Master Series
- New English Library Classic Novel Series
- New English Library Military History Series
- The Olympia Press Traveller's Companion Series
- Projekt Saucer Series
- Trains and Railways Special Publications

== See also ==
- Books in the United Kingdom
- List of companies of the United Kingdom
- Lists of publishing companies
