= Franc Luz =

Franc Luz (born December 22, 1950) is an American actor.

== Early career ==
Luz is from Massachusetts. He attended New Mexico State University, with the intention of studying and breaking into dramatic arts as a career. He studied both singing and theater arts.

After graduation, Luz won parts in many local and regional theater productions. In the late 1970s, he landed the major role of policeman Floyd in Fiorello, which ran at the Equity Liberty Theater in New York City. In 1979, he received attention playing Wanenis, the noble North American savage in the period piece Whoopee!. Both of the latter led to his first movie role, which also arrived that year; he was cast in a supporting part in the film Voices.

On the heels of this film exposure, Luz made his first transition to television. In 1979, he won the role of Dr. John Bennett on NBC's daytime serial The Doctors. For this role, he was nominated for a 1980 Daytime Emmy Award for Outstanding Lead Actor in a Drama Series. Luz continued on the show for another year before departing in 1981. During this period, Luz made an appearance as one of the cast of stars on the NBC daytime version of The Hollywood Squares. He appeared on the week of December 4, 1979, as a part of the show's soap opera week. Luz was featured in the top left-hand corner square alongside Nancy Pinkerton, his co-star from The Doctors.

== 1980s and beyond ==
After his departure from The Doctors, Luz returned to theatre work. In 1982, he took on the role of the sadistic dentist, Dr. Orin Scrivello, in the original off-Broadway production of Little Shop of Horrors. For this, he was nominated for the 1983 Drama Desk Award in the Outstanding Featured Actor in a Musical category. Luz's voice is one of several from the original cast that are featured in the 1992 CD release Little Shop of Horrors Soundtrack - Original Off-Broadway Cast.

Along the way, he joined other daytime soaps; in 1983, he played Tommy Lobo on One Life to Live. Shortly after, he appeared on Ryan's Hope for a particularly heated story arc in 1984. He played Steve Latham, lover of Delia Reid Ryan Coleridge (played by Robin Mattson), who held Delia captive while she was still committed to marry Matthew Crane (Harve Presnell).

Beginning in 1985, Luz assumed regular roles on primetime series. He played Ben Abbott on the CBS dramedy Hometown, a loose TV adaptation of the hit 1983 film The Big Chill. The series did not fare well in the ratings, however, and was canceled after two months. In 1986, he was a supporting cast member on the CBS medical drama Kay O'Brien as Sam, the boyfriend of the series' lead, played by Patricia Kalember. In 1989, Luz played Thomas Harper on the ABC sitcom Free Spirit, who was the father of a family whose housekeeper, played by Corinne Bohrer, was actually a witch.

Luz has guest starred on several other primetime TV series, including The Facts of Life, Hunter, Beauty and the Beast, Sisters, L.A. Law, and Silk Stalkings. A notable guest appearance was on Star Trek: The Next Generation as Odan, the Trill boyfriend of Dr. Beverly Crusher (Gates McFadden) in Season 4, Episode 23, "The Host". Returning to theater in the early 1990s, Luz starred in the Broadway production of Larry Gelbart's City of Angels, alongside Richard Kline and Michael Rupert.

In 1995, Luz played Don Antonio in Jeremy Leven's Don Juan DeMarco, which starred Johnny Depp in the title role. Prior to that, he had appeared on daytime TV again, playing Seth Tanner, a District Attorney, on All My Children from 1993 to 1994. In 1999, Luz appeared in the independent film The Pornographer and in Restraining Order, co-starring with Eric Roberts.

Beyond

In 1999, Luz left acting and began working as a tour guide in New York City.
