= John Bedford Lloyd =

American actor (born 1956)

- Born: January 2, 1956 (age 70); New Haven, Connecticut, U.S.
- Other name: John Bedford-Lloyd
- Education: Williams College (BA); Yale University (MFA)
- Occupation: Actor
- Spouse: Anne Twomey (m. 1986)
- Children: 2

John Bedford Lloyd (born January 2, 1956) is an American character actor.

== Life and career ==
Lloyd was born in New Haven, Connecticut, the son of architect Edward Bedford Lloyd (died 1990) and women's clothing designer and wedding planner Ann (1925-2008), daughter of John Whitmore Storrs, of Fairfield, Connecticut. Lloyd's parents lived at Southport, and at Greens Farms, Connecticut, later also residing at Palm Beach, Florida; they renovated and remodeled 'a number of houses' in both states. He has a sister and a brother.

While studying at Williams College in Williamstown, Massachusetts, he was cast in the play One Flew Over the Cuckoo's Nest, and decided to become a professional actor.

He later attended Yale School of Drama. After graduating, he moved to Manhattan and began his professional acting career on the stage. He's appeared in movies such as Trading Places, Crossing Delancey, Philadelphia, Fair Game, The Bourne Supremacy, Wall Street: Money Never Sleeps, and The Front Runner and in TV series such as Hometown, Law & Order, Aliens in the Family, John Adams, and Ozark.

He married actress Anne Twomey on August 23, 1986. The couple has two daughters, Hannah and Elizabeth.

== Filmography ==
=== Film ===
Year	Title	Role	Notes
1983	Trading Places	Andrew	
1984	C.H.U.D.	Shadow Man	
1987	Sweet Lorraine	Jack	
1987	Tough Guys Don't Dance	Wardley Meeks III	
1988	Crossing Delancey	Nick	
1989	The Abyss	Jammer Willis	
1990	Waiting for the Light	Reverend Stevens	
1991	Diary of a Hitman	Dr. Jameson	
1992	Primary Motive	Pat O'Hara	
1993	Philadelphia	Matt Beckett	
1995	Killer: A Journal of Murder	Dr. Karl Menninger	
1995	Fair Game	Det. Louis Aragon	
1995	Nixon	Cuban Man	
1998	Mixing Nia	Larry	
2001	Super Troopers	Mayor Timber	
2001	Riding in Cars with Boys	Mr. Forrester	
2004	The Bourne Supremacy	Teddy	
2004	The Manchurian Candidate	Jay "J.B." Johnston	
2005	Winter Passing	Leontes	
2006	The Hoax	Frank McCullough	
2007	The Killing Floor	Martin Soll	
2010	13	Mark	
2010	Wall Street: Money Never Sleeps	Treasury Secretary	
2014	Away from Here	Jon	
2016	The Brooklyn Banker	Agent Cahil	
2016	No Pay, Nudity	Ron	
2018	Radium Girls	Arthur Roeder	
2018	The Front Runner	David Broder	
2024	Bad Shabbos	John	
2025	Plainclothes	Lt. Sollars	

=== Television ===
Year	Title	Role	Notes
1983	The Edge of Night	Walter Gantz	9 episodes
1984	Alice	Buzz	Episode: "Jolene Throws a Curve"
1984	Remington Steele	Tommy Montague	Episode: "Molten Steele"
1985	Hometown	Peter Kincaid	10 episodes
1986	One Life to Live	Adrian LaRue	15 episodes
1985–87	Spenser: For Hire	Keith Kincaid / Powers' Thug	2 episodes
1987	Kojak: The Price of Justice	Bass	TV movie
1987	Leg Work	Joseph Lesak	Episode: "Blind Trust"
1988	The Equalizer	D.A. Francis Scanlon	2 episodes "Video Games" (S3.E14) "Target of Choice" (S3.E21)
1989–93	L.A. Law	Mitch Gelleher / Duane Butler	2 episodes
1991	ABC Afterschool Specials	Bear	Episode: "It's Only Rock & Roll"
1992–2022	Law & Order	Jerry Ryan / Prentiss's Lawyer / Dr. Christian Varick / Jonathan Ryder	4 episodes
1993	Brooklyn Bridge	Ed Jones	Episode: "Keeping Up with the Joneses"
1993	seaQuest DSV	Leslie "The Regulator" Farina	Episode: "The Regulator"
1996	Aliens in the Family	Doug Brody	8 episodes
1996–97	Remember WENN	Victor Comstock / Jonathan Arnold #1	25 episodes
1996–2000	Spin City	Wayne Sheridan / Dr. Bronsteen	3 episodes
1999	The Simple Life of Noah Dearborn	Robert Murphy	TV movie
1999	The West Wing	Lloyd Russell	Episode: "Post Hoc, Ergo Propter Hoc"
1999	Now and Again	Richard	Episode: "Nothing to Fear, But Nothing to Fear"
2000	Deadline	Danny Minton / Phil O'Hare	Episode: "Daniel in the Lion's DeN"
2001	All My Children	Warren Dunn	Unknown episodes
2004	Law & Order: Special Victims Unit	Mike Tucker	Episode: "Outcry"
2007	Traveler		Episode: "Pilot"
2008	John Adams	Richard Palmes	Episode: "Join or Die"
2009	Taking Chance	General Kruger	TV movie
2009	Life on Mars	Interrogator	Episode: "The Dark Side of the Mook"
2009–10	Three Rivers	Dr. Yorn	2 episodes
2011	Blue Bloods	Vincenzo	Episode: "Dedication"
2011	Suits	Gerald	Episode: "Pilot"
2011	Pan Am	Captain Dennis	Episode: "Kiss Kiss Bang Bang"
2012	Political Animals	Hal	Episode: "16 Hours"
2012	Person of Interest	Philip Chapple	Episode: "Shadow Box"
2013	Elementary	Lieutenant	Episode: "The Woman"
2013	Muhammad Ali's Greatest Fight	Byron "Whizzer" White	TV movie
2014	Unforgettable	George Mortimer	Episode: "East of Islip"
2014	The Americans	Jim Halliwell	Episode: "The Deal"
2014	The Good Wife	Bob Klepper	Episode: "The Last Call"
2014	The Divide	Victor Rosa	5 episodes
2014	Chicago P.D.	Don Enrietto	Episode: "Get My Cigarettes"
2014–15	Madam Secretary	Everard Burke	2 episodes
2016–17	The Blacklist	Susan's Man / Roman LeMarc	2 episodes
2018	Bull	Commissioner Taylor	Episode: "Excessive Force"
2018–22	Ozark	Frank Cosgrove	10 episodes
2019	Gotham	General Wade	2 episodes
2019	NCIS: New Orleans	Hank Griffin	Episode: "Bad Apple"
2020	Tommy	Lou Woods	3 episodes
2022	The Equalizer	Howard	Episode: "Vox Populi"
2024	FBI: Most Wanted	Sheriff Blake	Episode: "The Electric Company"
