= Herlihy Peak =

Mountain in the American state of California

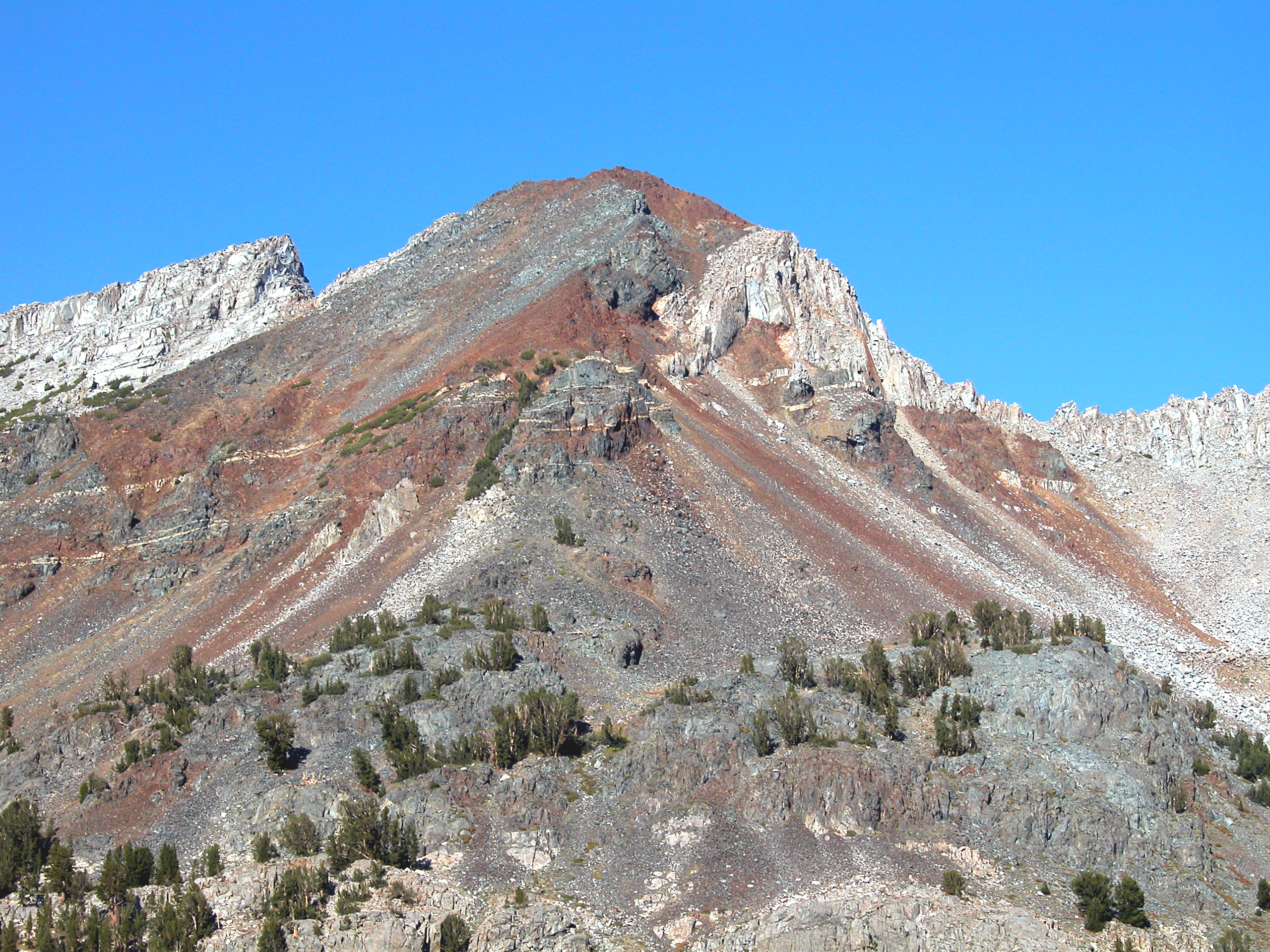
- South aspect

Highest point
- Elevation: 11,758 ft (3,584 m)
- Prominence: 440 ft (130 m)
- Isolation: 0.71 mi (1.14 km)
- Coordinates: 37°34′40″N 118°57′36″W

Naming
- Etymology: Robert Herlihy

Geography
- Location within California Location within the United States
- Location: John Muir Wilderness
- Country: United States of America
- State: California
- County: Mono
- Parent range: Sierra Nevada
- Topo map: USGS Bloody Mountain

Climbing
- First ascent: 1966
- Easiest route: class 2 South ridge

Herlihy Peak is an 11,758-foot-elevation (3,584-meter) mountain summit located in the Sierra Nevada mountain range in Mono County of northern California, United States. It is situated approximately four miles south of the community of Mammoth Lakes, in the John Muir Wilderness, on land managed by Inyo National Forest. Herlihy Peak is positioned midway between landmarks Crystal Crag and Bloody Mountain. Topographic relief is significant as the east aspect rises 2,060 feet (630 meters) above Valentine Lake in approximately one mile, and the west aspect rises 1,844 feet (562 meters) above Skelton Lake in 0.8 mile. Precipitation runoff from the peak drains to Mammoth Creek.

== History ==
The first ascent of Herlihy Peak was made September 3, 1966, by Bob Herlihy, Andy Smatko, Bill Schuler, and Ellen Siegal. R. J. Secor named the peak in memory of Bob Herlihy, a Sierra Club member, who six years after making the first ascent, was killed by lightning on Mount Goode in July 1972. A memorial plaque and Bob's ashes are placed on the summit of Herlihy Peak. This mountain's toponym has not been officially adopted by the United States Board on Geographic Names, so it is not labelled on USGS maps, and will remain unofficial as long as the USGS policy of not adopting new toponyms in designated wilderness areas remains in effect.

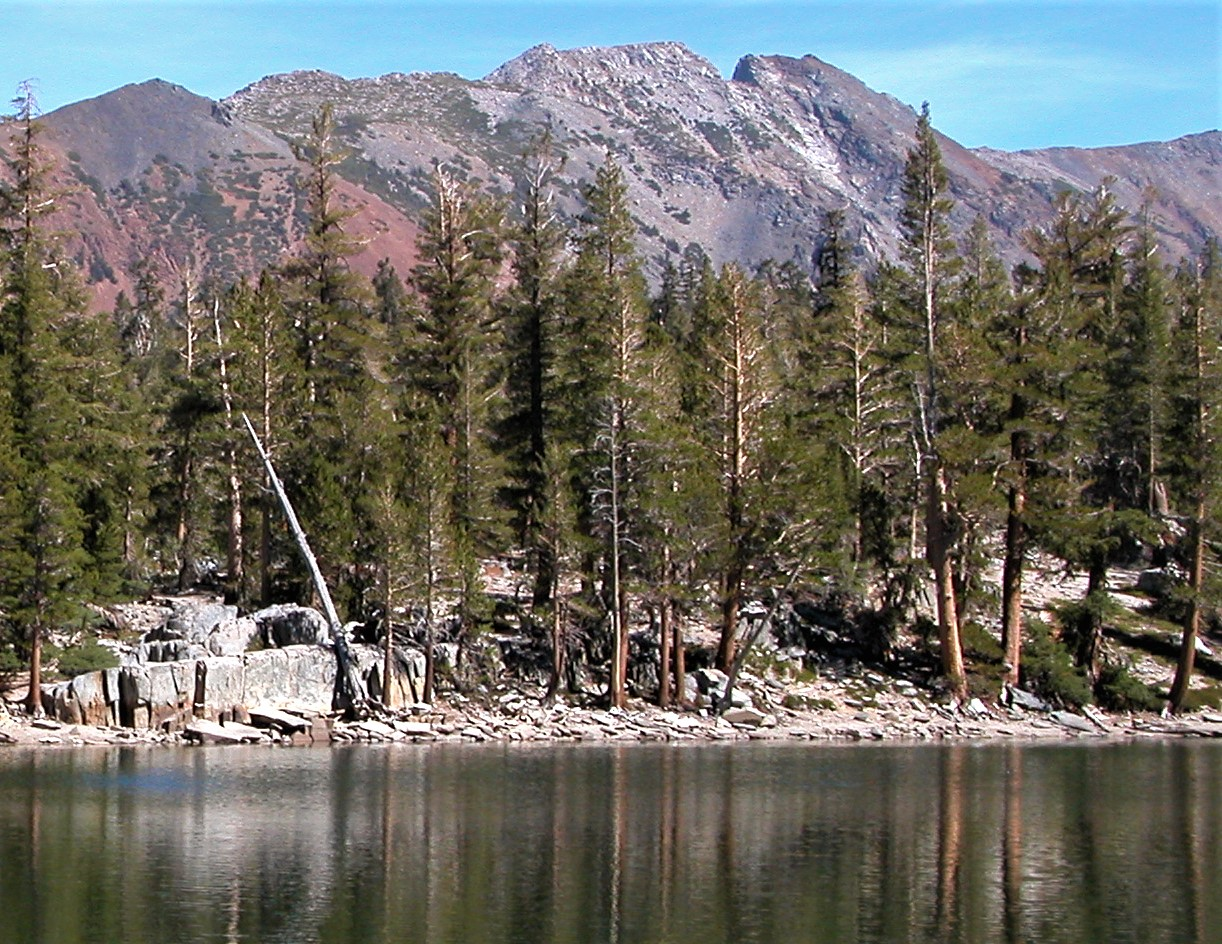
West aspect of Pyramid Peak (centered at top) with Herlihy Peak to immediate right.

== Climate ==
Herlihy Peak is located in an alpine climate zone. Most weather fronts originate in the Pacific Ocean and travel east toward the Sierra Nevada mountains. As fronts approach, they are forced upward by the peaks (orographic lift), causing them to drop their moisture in the form of rain or snowfall onto the range.

== See also ==
- List of mountain peaks of California
