= Big Girls Don't Cry... They Get Even =

1992 film by Joan Micklin Silver

Big Girls Don't Cry...They Get Even
- Directed by: Joan Micklin Silver
- Written by: Mark Goddard
- Produced by: Gerald T. Olson
- Starring: Hillary Wolf; Griffin Dunne; Patricia Kalember; Jenny Lewis; Ben Savage; Adrienne Shelly; Dan Futterman; Margaret Whitton; David Strathairn
- Cinematography: Theo van de Sande
- Edited by: Janice Hampton
- Music by: Patrick Williams
- Production companies: MG Entertainment; Perlman Productions; New Line Cinema
- Distributed by: New Line Distribution, Inc.
- Release dates: October 4, 1991 (Minneapolis, Minnesota); May 8, 1992 (United States)
- Running time: 104 minutes
- Country: United States
- Language: English
- Budget: $1 million
- Box office: $271,327

Big Girls Don't Cry... They Get Even (titled Stepkids in early promotional trailers and in Australia) is a 1991 American comedy film directed by Joan Micklin Silver.

== Plot ==
13-year-old Laura Chartoff is a girl in a large dysfunctional family. After her parents' divorce, her father, David, a flaky artist, has now accumulated three ex-wives, a 3-year-old daughter, Jessie (with fourth wife Barbara, one of the wives Laura actually liked), and is living with Stephanie – who is pregnant with his twins. Laura's mother, Melinda, had her own two-day marriage and is now married to her third husband, Keith Powers.

Keith is a successful and seemingly selfish businessman and a widower with three kids of his own – resentful adult son 20 yr old Josh, self-obsessed 14 yr old daughter Corinne (who bonds with her similarly shallow stepmother), and his 12 yr old son Kurt, who seems to be Keith's favorite, as he does whatever he tells him to do and as a result adopts a rather militaristic personality while he was away at military school. With Melinda also picking Corrine as her favorite, this leaves Laura unintentionally shut out. Added to the mix of siblings and stepsiblings is Laura's half-brother, 8-year-old genius Sam, the result of an unexpected pregnancy of Melinda and Keith.

Josh visits his mother's grave on the anniversary of her death and then confronts Keith for forgetting the date. Later, Laura gets in trouble with Keith for talking with Josh. Having felt incredibly hurt by her family, Laura decides to run away, going to see Josh at his lakeside cabin. And for a time, Laura's actually relaxed and happy spending time with someone who enjoys her company. Josh, however, attempts to reach out to one of Laura's family members without her knowing. Keith deduces that Laura will be with Josh ("brats of a feather"). But when the family arrives at the cabin, Laura concludes that Josh betrayed her trust and runs away.

At the same time, Barbara arrives with Jessie, as does Laura's father with Stephanie. It's during the search for Laura that all the family members are forced to live under the same roof. Laura meets a host of colorful characters along the way, including teen robbers and an all-too-happy family. Meanwhile, her family members each have their own experiences and realizations when it comes to themselves and their families. And as Laura is about to return, the police come with uncertain news and give her parents Laura's jacket.

The jacket has blood, though unknown to them, it's the blood of one of the robbers Laura punched. And it's this small development that brings both her parents and step-parents to the possibility that Laura could be hurt or worse. Laura arrives in time to see some of what's going on and gets surprised by Josh. She accuses him of betraying her to Melinda and Keith, but Josh reveals that he only called Barbara, knowing that Laura liked her. Josh helps her come to the conclusion that she can't escape family. Laura returns to the cabin to embrace the "weirdness" of her extended family, who have all sorted out their own lives a little more during their shared search for Laura.

== Cast ==
- Hillary Wolf as Laura Chartoff, a 13-year-old girl and the main character of the story
- Griffin Dunne as David Chartoff, Laura's divorced father
- Margaret Whitton as Melinda Chartoff Powers, Laura's divorced mother
- Patricia Kalember as Barbara Chartoff, Laura's stepmother
- David Strathairn as Keith Powers, Laura's stepfather
- Dan Futterman as Josh Powers, Laura's 20-year-old older stepbrother
- Jenny Lewis as Corinne Powers, Laura's 14-year-old older stepsister
- Trenton Teigen as Kurt Powers, Laura's 12-year-old younger stepbrother
- Ben Savage as Sam Powers, Laura's 8-year-old younger maternal half-brother
- Jessica Seely as Jessie Chartoff, Laura's 3-year-old younger paternal half-sister
- Adrienne Shelly as Stephanie, David's pregnant girlfriend

== Production ==
The movie was filmed using permits to access locations in California's east central Mammoth Ranger District in the Inyo National Forest, as well as locations in the (former) Arroyo Seco Ranger District of the Angeles National Forest near Los Angeles.

Much of the lakeside action takes place at Lake Mamie in Mammoth Lakes, California, with Mammoth Crest, Crystal Crag and Lake Mary Road visible in many scenes.
