= Joe Coomer =

Joe Coomer may refer to:

- Joe Coomer (American football) (1917–1979), American football player
- Joe Coomer (author), American writer
