= Margaret Whitton =

American actress (1949–2016)

- Margaret Whitton in Major League (1989)
- Born: Margaret Ann Whitton; November 30, 1949; Fort Meade, Maryland, U.S.
- Died: December 4, 2016 (aged 67); Palm Beach, Florida, U.S.
- Other name: Peggy Whitton
- Occupations: Actress, director, writer, producer.
- Years active: 1965–2016
- Spouse: Warren Spector (m. 1993)

Margaret Ann Whitton (November 30, 1949 – December 4, 2016) was an American stage, film, and television actress.

== Life and career ==
Whitton was born on Fort Meade, Maryland, a US Army base in the suburbs of Baltimore. She spent many of her formative years in Japan; her father was an Army colonel, and her mother was a nurse. The family eventually relocated to Haddonfield, New Jersey, and then to Fort Lauderdale, Florida, where Whitton started acting at Northeast High School. She made her Off-Broadway debut in 1973 with Baby Goya, and her Broadway debut in 1982's Steaming.

Whitton did her primary film work between 1986 and 1993. Her most visible roles were that of socialite Vera Prescott in The Secret of My Success (1987), and spiteful baseball team owner Rachel Phelps in Major League (1989), and its sequel Major League II (1994). Whitton also appeared in The Best of Times (1986) and The Man Without a Face (1993). Her other film roles included parts in National Lampoon Goes to the Movies (1982), Love Child (1982) and 9½ Weeks (1986).

Whitton worked as a television actress, with appearances in the soap operas One Life to Live and The Doctors. Her first prime time role was in the 1985 dramedy Hometown. In 1989, Whitton played a divorcee in the short-lived comedy series A Fine Romance. She later starred in the 1991 sitcom Good & Evil, which was cancelled after six episodes.

Whitton returned to the stage, appearing on Broadway in And the Apple Doesn't Fall... (1995), as Mac in Jeffrey Hatcher's The Three Viewings (1995), and in the original musical Marlene (1999).

Distribution rights to her film A Bird of the Air were acquired by Freestyle Digital Media. It was based upon the novel The Loop by Joe Coomer and was adapted for film by Roger Towne. At the time of her death, Whitton served as president of Tashtego Films, an independent-film production company, co-founded with producer Steven Tabakin.

== Personal life ==
Whitton was married to Bear Stearns executive Warren Spector from 1993 until her death in 2016.

== Death ==
Whitton died on December 4, 2016, four days after her 67th birthday, at her home in Florida after a brief battle with cancer.

== Filmography ==
=== Film ===
Year	Title	Role	Notes
1972	Parades	Jane	Credited as Peggy Whitton
1974	Teenage Hitchhikers	Sola Alcoa	Credited as Peggy Whitton
1982	National Lampoon's Movie Madness	Lousille Fogerty	
1982	Love Child	Jackie Steinberg	
1986	The Best of Times	Darla	
1986	9½ Weeks	Molly	
1987	The Secret of My Success	Vera Prescott	
1987	Baby Boom	Executive in Conference Room	Uncredited
1987	Ironweed	Katrina Dougherty	
1989	Major League	Rachel Phelps	
1989	Little Monsters	Holly Stevenson	
1992	Big Girls Don't Cry... They Get Even	Melinda Chartoff Powers	
1993	The Man Without a Face	Catherine Palin	
1994	Major League II	Rachel Phelps	
1994	Trial by Jury	Jane Lyle	

=== Television ===
Year	Title	Role	Notes
1975–76	The Doctors	Joan Dancy	Unknown episodes
1984	Miami Vice	Cassie Bramlette	Episode: "Glades"
1985	Hometown	Barbara Donnelly	10 episodes
1986	Spenser: For Hire	Ellen Calone	Episode: "Widow's Walk"
1987	Tales from the Darkside	Mary Jones	Episode: "Mary, Mary"
1987	Cat & Mousse	Miriam	Television short film
1988	Spenser: For Hire	Janet Cole	Episode: "Substantial Justice"
1989	A Fine Romance	Louisa Phillips	13 episodes
1990	Kojak: None So Blind	Michele Hogarth	Television film
1991	The Summer My Father Grew Up	Naomi	Television film
1991	Good & Evil	Genevieve	6 episodes
1993	Cutters	Adrienne St. John	5 episodes
1994	Menendez: A Killing in Beverly Hills	Leslie Abramson	Television film
