= Damon Gupton =

American actor and orchestral conductor (born 1973)

- Born: Damon Jamal Gupton; January 4, 1973 (age 53); Detroit, Michigan, U.S.
- Education: University of Michigan; Juilliard School
- Occupations: Actor; orchestral conductor
- Years active: 1999–present

Damon Jamal Gupton (born January 4, 1973) is an American actor and orchestral conductor, best known for his series regular roles as Charles Foster on Deadline, Evrard Velerio on Prime Suspect, Adam Page on The Divide, Detective Cal Brown on The Player, Deputy Chief Henderson on Black Lightning, and SSA Stephen Walker on Criminal Minds. He has also co-starred in the films The Last Airbender (2010), Whiplash (2014), and La La Land (2016).

== Early life and education ==
Gupton was born in Detroit, Michigan. He attended the University of Michigan, where he directed a musical ensemble, and graduated with a bachelor's degree in music education. He received the Emerging Artist Award from the University's School of Music, Theatre & Dance Alumni Society. He also graduated in drama from Juilliard School in New York. Gupton studied conducting at the Aspen Music Festival and School with David Zinman and Murry Sidlin. He later attended the National Conducting Institute in Washington, D.C., studying with Leonard Slatkin.

== Career ==
Gupton's first film appearance was in the drama Unfaithful (2002).

In 2004, he was an American Conducting Fellow at the Houston Symphony, and was assistant conductor of the Kansas City Symphony in 2006. Gupton was a guest conductor with various orchestras, including the Cincinnati Pops, Cleveland Orchestra, National Symphony Orchestra, Detroit Symphony, Baltimore Symphony, San Diego Symphony, San Antonio Symphony, Princeton Symphony Orchestra, as well as Monte Carlo Philharmonic Orchestra, the NHK Orchestra of Tokyo, and the Orquesta Filarmonica de UNAM. He was the conductor of the Sphinx Chamber Orchestra during its national tour, including performances at Carnegie Hall. Gupton won Mexico City's third International Eduardo Mata Conducting Competition, the Robert J. Harth Conducting Prize, and The Aspen Conducting Prize. He was named a Presidential Professor by the University of Michigan in January 2009.

In 2012, Gupton performed in the Broadway production of the play Clybourne Park, receiving an AUDELCO nomination for Best Supporting Actor. In September 2012, Gupton landed the lead role on the short-lived AMC drama series The Divide, playing District Attorney Adam Page. Gupton joined the cast of the NBC procedural drama series The Player in February 2015, co-starring as Detective Cal Brown alongside Wesley Snipes. On December 3, 2015, he was cast in the recurring role of psychiatrist Gregg Edwards on the fourth season of A&E's drama-thriller series Bates Motel.

On September 30, 2016, CBS announced that Gupton had joined Criminal Minds as a regular cast member, portraying Stephen Walker, a special agent in the Behavioral Analysis Unit. He began appearing in the series' twelfth season. On June 11, 2017, it was announced that he would depart the show after one season. Gupton was subsequently cast as Inspector Henderson in the superhero drama series Black Lightning.

== Filmography ==
=== Film ===
Year	Title	Role	Notes
2002	Unfaithful	Other Businessman	
2006	Helen at Risk	Pearson	Short
2006	Drift	Sal Bianca M.E.	TV movie
2007	Before the Devil Knows You're Dead	Doctor	
2010	Clybourne Park	Albert / Kevin	Video
2010	The Last Airbender	Monk Gyatso	
2010	Strange Brew	Lester Lewis III	TV movie
2012	This Is 40	Colonoscopy Technician	
2014	Whiplash	Mr. Kramer	
2015	Always Watching: A Marble Hornets Story	Leonard Herring	
2016	La La Land	Harry	
2026	The Drama	Roger Harwood	
TBA	Lear Rex †	Curran	Post-production

=== Television ===
Year	Title	Role	Notes
1999	Law & Order	Sammy Morris	Episode: "Merger"
2000	The Wonderful World of Disney	Sam Claiborne	Episode: "The Loretta Claiborne Story"
2000	Third Watch	Carter	Episode: "Just Another Night at the Opera"
2000–2001	Deadline	Charles Foster	Main cast
2002	Hack	Mark Simmons	Episode: "Slippery Slope"
2006	Conviction	Keith Watts	Episode: "Indebted"
2009	The Unusuals	Wiley Probst	Episode: "Crime Slut"
2010	Law & Order: Criminal Intent	Detective Gearhardt	Episode: "Delicate" & "Love Sick"
2011–2012	Prime Suspect	Evrard Velerio	Main cast
2012	The Newsroom	Sutton Wall	Episode: "Bullies"
2014	Rake	Marcus Barzmann	Recurring cast
2014	Suits	James Quelling	Episode: "Know When to Fold 'Em" & "No Way Out"
2014	The Divide	Adam Page	Main cast
2015	Empire	Detective Calvin Walker	Recurring cast: season 1
2015	The Player	Detective Cal Brown	Main cast
2016	Goliath	Leonard Letts	Recurring cast: season 1
2016–2017	Bates Motel	Dr. Gregg Edwards	Recurring cast: seasons 4–5
2016–2017	Criminal Minds	SSA Stephen Walker	Main cast: season 12
2018	Dirty John	Detective Dennis Lukens	Episode: "One Shoe"
2018–2020	Black Lightning	Inspector Henderson	Main cast: season 1–3
2020	The Comey Rule	Jeh Johnson	Episode: "Night One & Night Two"
2022	The Last Days of Ptolemy Grey	Coydog	Main cast
2022	Super Pumped	David Drummond	Recurring
2023–2024	The Big Door Prize	Father Reuben	Main role; 16 episodes
2025	Happy Face	Elijah	Recurring
