= Bates Motel season 4 =

Season of television series

Bates Motel
- Season 4
- Promotional poster and home media cover art
- Starring: Vera Farmiga; Freddie Highmore; Max Thieriot; Olivia Cooke; Nestor Carbonell
- No. of episodes: 10

Release
- Original network: A&E
- Original release: March 7 – May 16, 2016

Season chronology
- ← Previous; Season 3 Next → Season 5

The fourth season of Bates Motel aired from March 7 to May 16, 2016. The season consisted of 10 episodes and aired on A&E. The series itself is described as a "contemporary prequel" to the 1960 film Psycho, following the life of Norman Bates and his mother Norma prior to the events portrayed in the Hitchcock film. The series takes place in the fictional town of White Pine Bay, Oregon.

The season received critical acclaim from television critics, and was nominated for two Primetime Creative Arts Emmy Awards. It also won three People's Choice Awards for Cable TV Drama, Cable TV Actress (Farmiga), and Cable TV Actor (Highmore). Bates Motel's fourth season maintained consistent ratings throughout its airing, with the season premiere drawing in 1.55 million viewers and the finale totalling 1.50 million. The season was released on Blu-ray and DVD on October 18, 2016.

== Cast and characters ==
=== Main ===
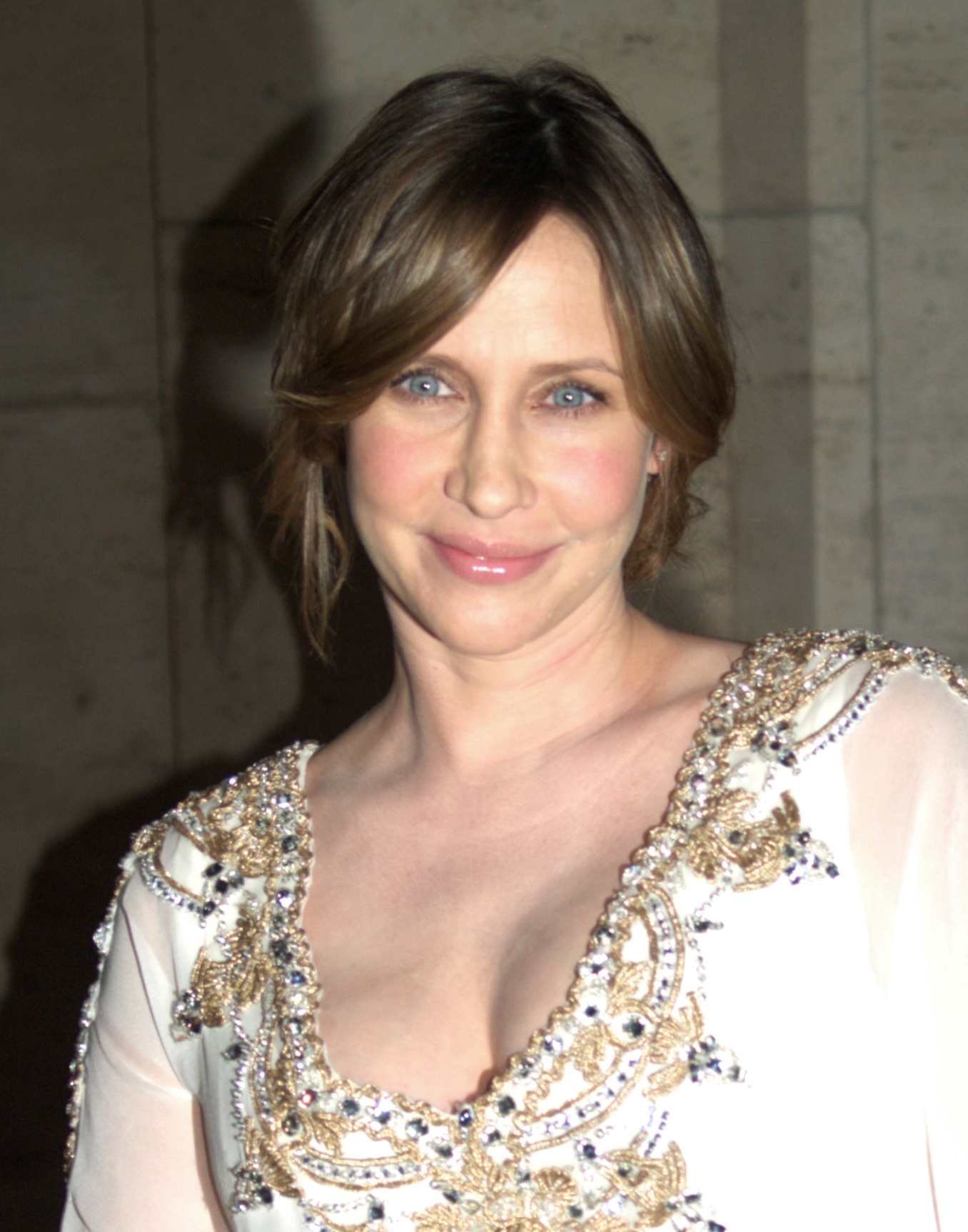
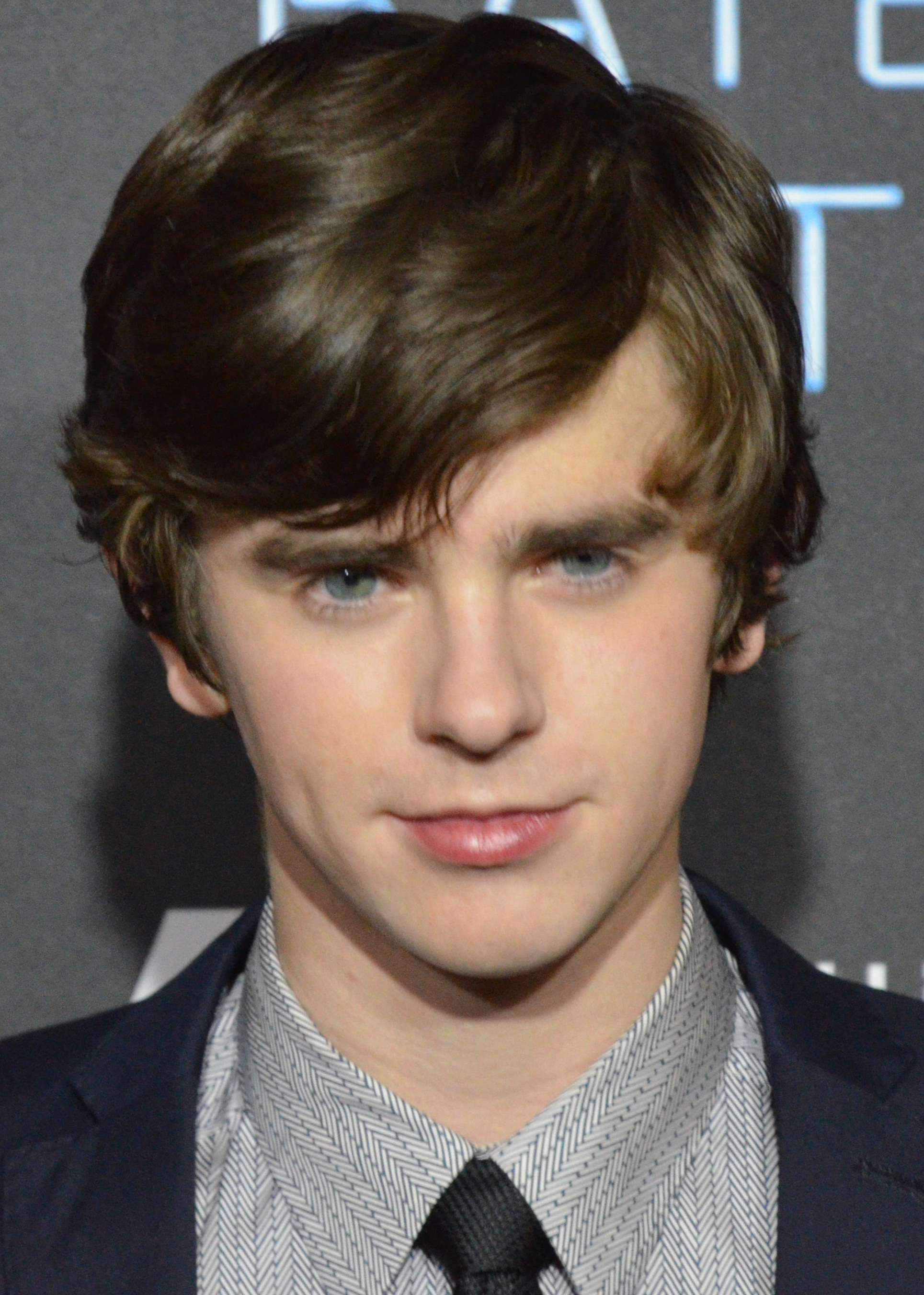
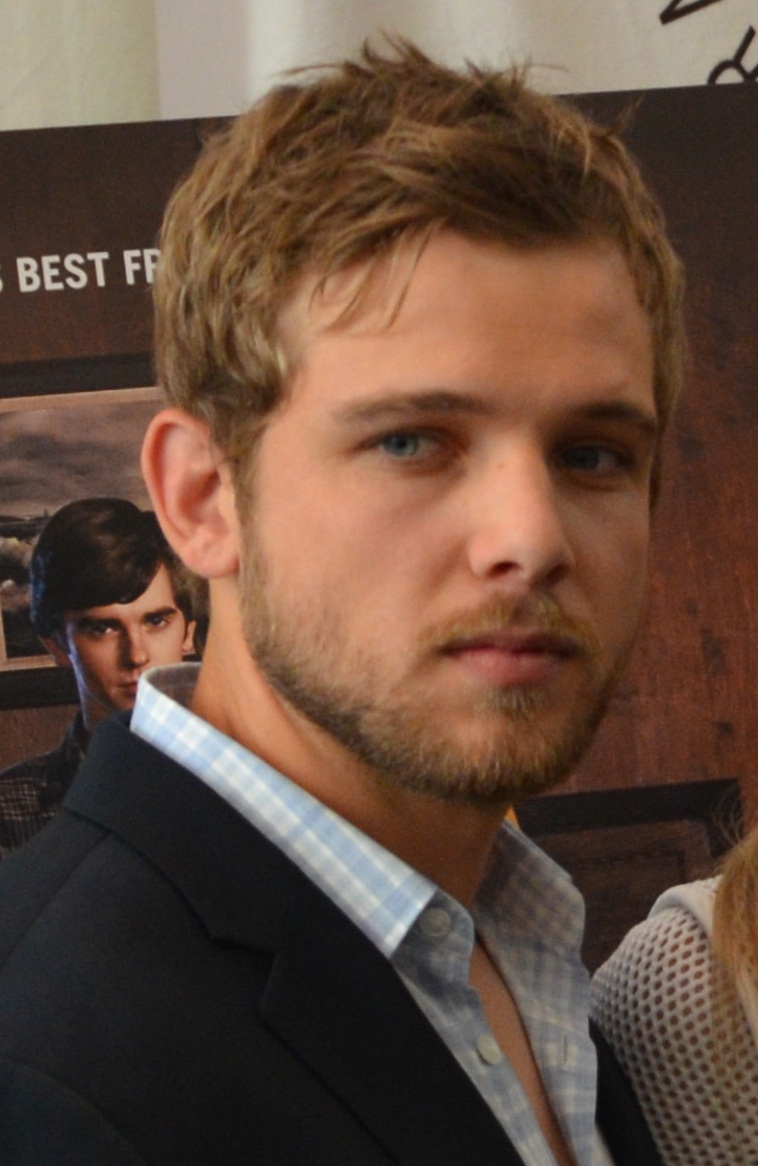
Vera Farmiga, Freddie Highmore, and Max Thieriot (left to right) portray Norma Louise Bates, Norman Bates, and Dylan Massett, respectively, who appear in all episodes.
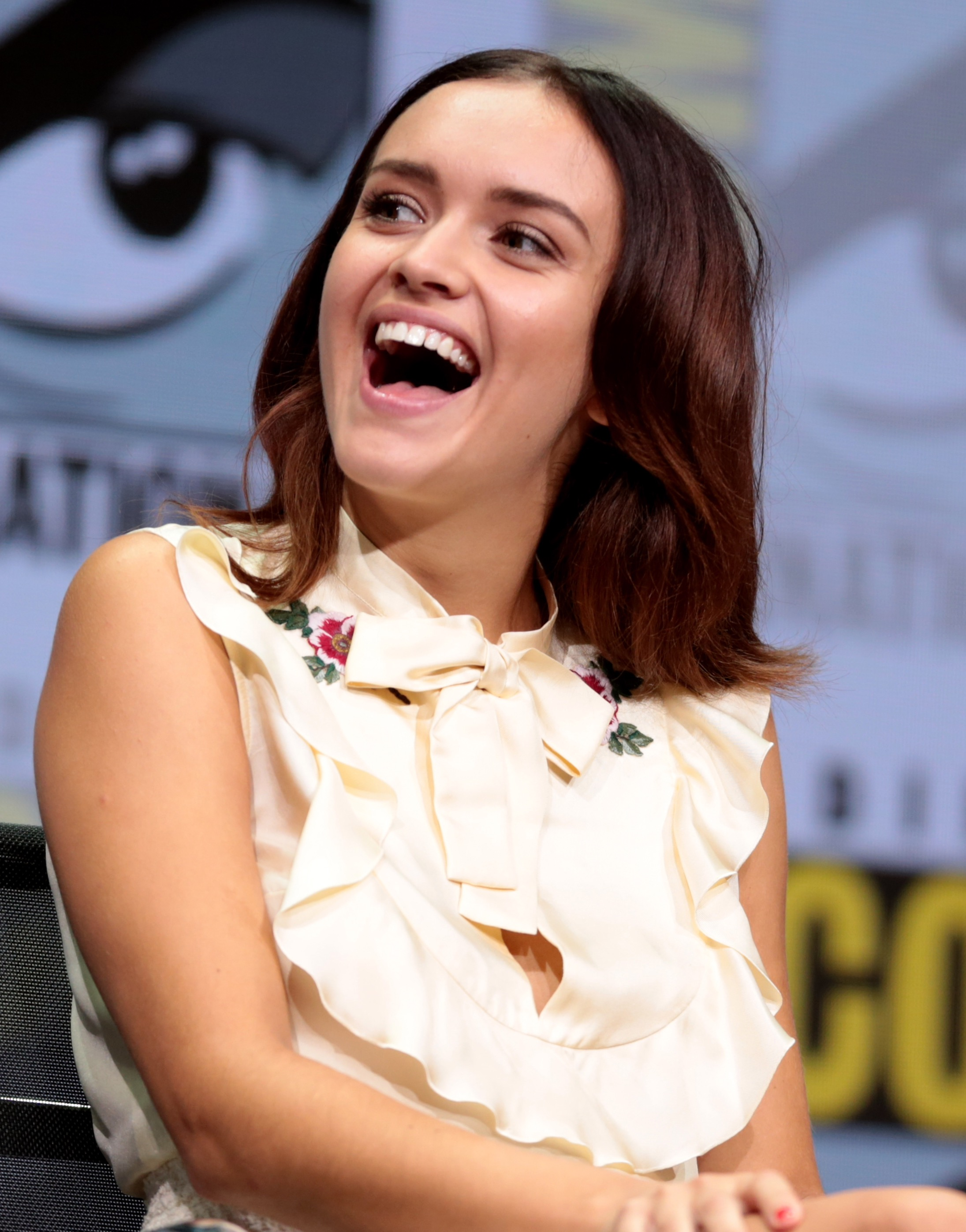
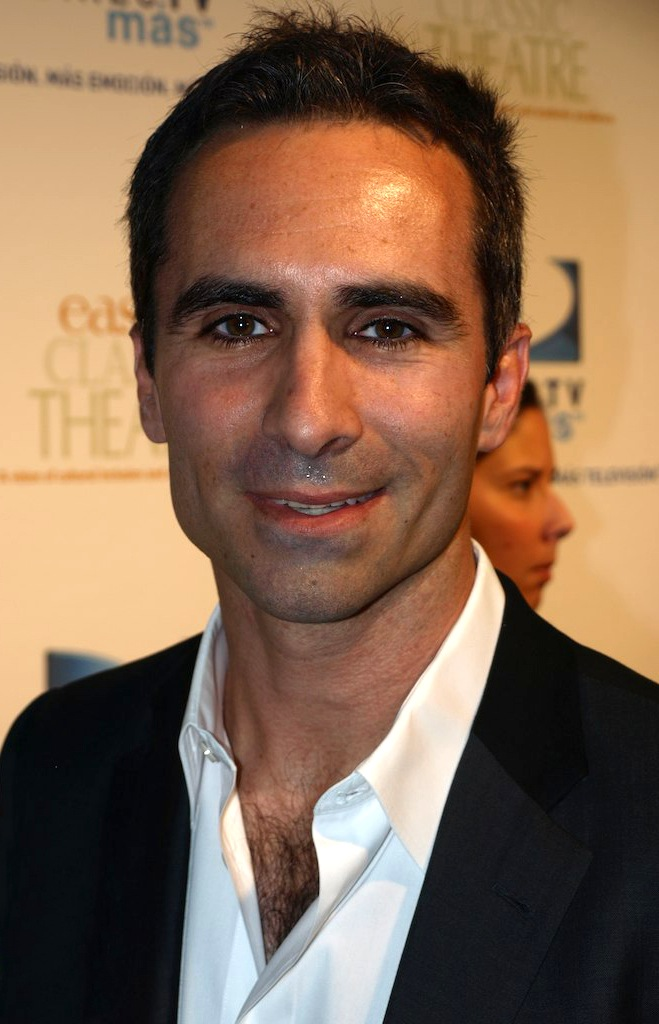
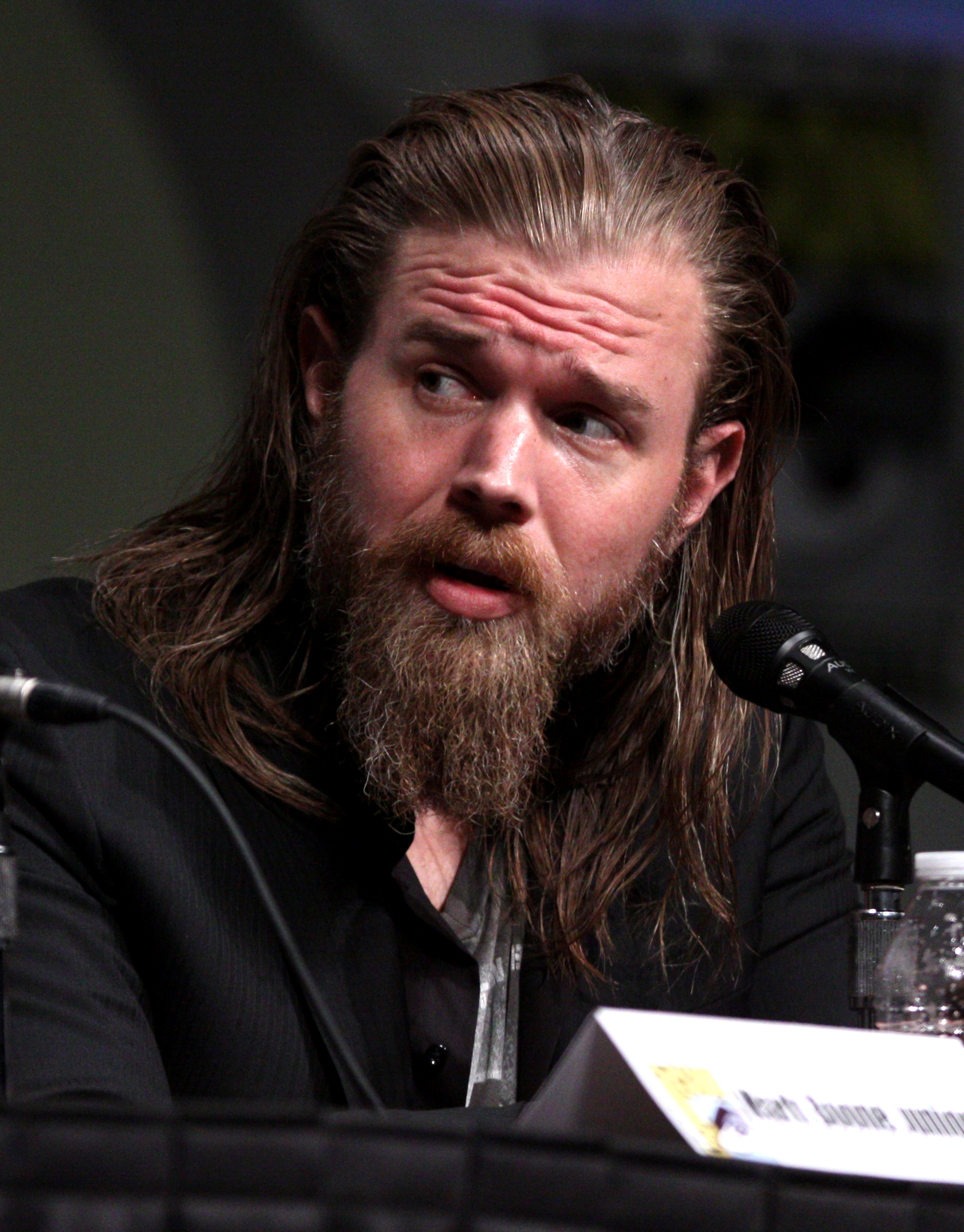
Olivia Cooke, Nestor Carbonell, and Ryan Hurst (left to right) portray Emma Decody, Sheriff Alex Romero, and Chick Hogan, respectively.
- Vera Farmiga as Norma Louise Bates
- Freddie Highmore as Norman Bates
- Max Thieriot as Dylan Massett
- Olivia Cooke as Emma Decody
- Nestor Carbonell as Sheriff Alex Romero

=== Recurring ===
- Damon Gupton as Dr. Gregg Edwards
- Jaime Ray Newman as Rebecca Hamilton
- Andrew Howard as Will Decody
- Terence Kelly as Dickie Bolton
- Ryan Hurst as Chick Hogan
- Marshall Allman as Julian Howe
- Kelly-Ruth Mercier as Nurse Penny
- Aliyah O'Brien as Regina
- Karina Logue as Audrey Ellis
- Fiona Vroom as Vicki Monroe
- Craig Erickson as Howard Collins
- Anika Noni Rose as Liz Babbitt
- Louis Ferreira as Doctor Guynan
- David Cubitt as Sam Bates
- Luke Roessler as Young Norman

=== Guest ===
- Kevin Rahm as Bob Paris
- Keenan Tracey as Gunner
- Alexia Fast as Athena
- Alessandro Juliani as Interviewer
- Lindsey Ginter as Mac Dixon
- Kenny Johnson as Caleb Calhoun
- Gina Chiarelli as O'Sullivan
- Carmen Moore as Grace Wei
- Jay Brazeau as Justin Willcock
- Molly Price as Detective Chambers

== Production ==
=== Casting ===
Ryan Hurst returned to the series as Chick Hogan, a recurring character throughout the third season. Damon Gupton was cast in the recurring role of Gregg Edwards, a doctor at Pineview Mental Institution. Jaime Ray Newman played a major recurring role throughout the season as Rebecca Hamilton, a former girlfriend of Romero.

=== Filming ===
The series was filmed on location in Aldergrove, British Columbia. At the beginning of the first season, a replica of the original Bates Motel set from the film Psycho was built on 272nd Street. Nestor Carbonell directed one episode of the fourth season. Principal photography for season 4 began on November 30, 2015 in Vancouver and surrounding areas, and concluded on April 6, 2016. Highmore wrote the eighth episode of the season.

== Episodes ==
No. overall	No. in season	Title	Directed by	Written by	Original release date	US viewers (millions)
31	1	"A Danger to Himself and Others"	Tucker Gates	Carlton Cuse & Kerry Ehrin	March 7, 2016	1.55
Picking up on the day after Season 3 ended, Romero disposes of Bob Paris' body in the bay. With Norman missing, Norma and Dylan worry about his well being. A farmer discovers an unstable Norman, resulting in him being admitted to a psychiatric unit. Meanwhile, Dylan goes to Portland to be by Emma's bedside after her lung transplant, while Norma attempts to have Norman discharged from the institution. The psychiatric doctor refuses to let Norman leave until after a 48-hour observation period, and chastises Norma for never taking Norman to a doctor for his frequent blackouts. Desperate, Norma returns to Pineview Mental Hospital hoping to have Norman admitted as soon as possible and encounters a psychiatrist, Dr. Edwards. Since she doesn't have insurance, Norma asks Romero to marry her so she can use his, but he rebuffs her. Elsewhere, Emma's estranged mother, Audrey, attempts to make contact, but Emma's father turns her away. As Audrey seeks help from Norman, "Mother" strangles her to death with her own scarf.
32	2	"Goodnight, Mother"	Tim Southam	Kerry Ehrin & Torrey Speer	March 14, 2016	1.45
Norman tries to remember what happened the night before. He then has flashes of "Mother" hiding Audrey's body in the basement freezer. Meanwhile, Emma breathes freely for the first time with her new lungs without her oxygen tank, to the relief of Dylan and her father. Meanwhile, Romero visits Pineview with the money for Norman's admission. However, because Norman is 18-years-old, the institution needs to have his signature on consent forms. Norman accuses Norma of killing Audrey, alerting his mother to the fact he committed another murder. She searches the motel's pit for a body, but only discovers a glove. Norman later finds the Pineview forms in the motel's fax machine. He then has a vision of his deceased father, who tells him that Norma is the one who killed him and that she is trying to blame Norman for all the killings. Norman's behavior scares Norma, who flees from him and calls Romero for help. With his mother's gun, Norman alludes to the pair committing suicide since they can't be happy in life. Romero arrives at the Bates residence, and Norma convinces Norman to sign the consent forms before he is taken away to the Pineview hospital.
33	3	"'Til Death Do You Part"	Phil Abraham	Steve Kornacki & Alyson Evans	March 21, 2016	1.46
Norma and Romero get married, and afterward, Romero moves into the Bates house in order for their relationship to look real. Romero has the pit filled in as a wedding gift, but a worker discovers one of Audrey's earrings at the site, distressing Norma. Meanwhile, Dylan returns to White Pine Bay to fire Gunner and get out of the drug trade, but arrives at the farm to find Gunner quitting instead. Chick arrives at Dylan's farm looking for revenge on Caleb, but Dylan informs him he hasn't been in contact with his father since he skipped town. At the Pineview asylum, Norman has his first therapy session with Dr. Edwards, who presses Norman to share his concerns about his mother. Norman is conflicted as both hiding and telling the "truth" would cause problems for Norma. Later, Norma visits Norman, and the two have a heated exchange in front of staff and other inpatients. Elsewhere, Romero's ex-girlfriend, Rebecca, visits him, worried that her part in Bob's money laundering scheme may come to light. Romero tells her to keep her head down and she'll be safe from suspicion.
34	4	"Lights of Winter"	T.J. Scott	Tom Szentgyörgyi	March 28, 2016	1.52
Norman and fellow patient Julian plan an escape from Pineview. Meanwhile, Norma and Romero become closer in their sham marriage, and he suggests opening a joint bank account to make it appear more legitimate. He then gets an urgent message from Rebecca, who later tells him Bob Paris has $3 million in a safety deposit box, to which Romero finds the key. Norma visits Emma in the Portland hospital, who tells her to start living her own life and to not worry about Norman. Emma also plans to move to Seattle and asks Dylan to move with her. After attending a carnival with Romero and awkwardly meeting Rebecca, Norma and Romero return home to find the house ransacked. Meanwhile, Norman and Julian escape from Pineview and hitch a ride to a strip club. Julian gives Norman some money, and both are taken separately to private rooms. While alone with a dancer, "Mother" appears, but the two are interrupted by a fight between Julian and some bouncers. This leads to Dr. Edwards arriving to collect Norman, who breaks down and accepts Dr. Edwards' help.
35	5	"Refraction"	Sarah Boyd	Erica Lipez	April 11, 2016	1.42
Norma and Romero begin cleaning the house, and she is upset about her favorite stained-glass window being broken. Romero mentions that things like that happen "when you're married to the sheriff". He later cautions Rebecca, whom he knows broke in, to stay away. Norma asks in town about a glass repairman, and Chick Hogan arrives at the house for the job. He later learns that Caleb is Norma's brother. Meanwhile, Dylan takes Emma home to White Pine Bay, but later goes to Seattle for a job interview. At Pineview, Norman begins his therapy sessions with Dr. Edwards and seems to be open with most subjects, except that of his father. He calls to leave an apologetic voicemail with Norma, who later visits him at the institution; Dr. Edwards later suggests the visit was all in Norman's mind, which is confirmed when Norman gets agitated and "Mother" starts talking with the doctor. Also, Chick returns to see Norma and says he previously met Caleb, who was introduced as Dylan's father. He tells Norma of his hatred for Caleb and asks her to decide her brother's fate.
36	6	"The Vault"	Olatunde Osunsanmi	Scott Kosar	April 18, 2016	1.33
Norma meets again with Chick, who threatens to publicly reveal her past with Caleb and, ultimately, ruin her marriage to Romero. This sets off a sense of urgency in her, in which she manages to get Caleb's possible location from Dylan. She contacts Caleb, but later tells Chick to do his worst in destroying her life. Meanwhile, Romero gives the safety deposit box key to Rebecca, adding that he wants none of the money in return. At Pineview, Dr. Edwards explains dissociative identity disorder to Norman and that the "Mother" persona is what arises during his blackouts. Norman recalls when he was age seven and Norma tried to leave his drunken father. She was raped while Norman hid under the bed. Dr. Edwards asks to speak to "Mother", who warns him to not allow Norman to recall memories that will hurt himself. Chick delivers the window with Romero's help. Norma then explains Chick's true intentions and tearfully reveals her past to Romero, believing he will leave her as a result. Despite the truth, Romero decides to stay married to Norma.
37	7	"There's No Place Like Home"	Néstor Carbonell	Philip Buiser	April 25, 2016	1.35
Norma tells Romero about her dream to renovate the Bates house, but her financial position won't grant her the opportunity to do so. Romero reveals to her the money he took from Bob on the night of his murder, offering it so she can begin making her dream a reality. While at Pineview creating papier-mâché, Norman finds a newspaper clipping about his mother's marriage to Romero. Norman calls home to hear Romero answer the phone and Norma lie regarding his reasons for being there. Norman then sets into motion his plans of going home. Meanwhile, Dylan investigates Audrey's disappearance when Emma loses contact with her. He shows Norma the letter of Audrey's found in Norman's room, confronting her about why it was in Norman's possession. Dylan later gives the letter to Emma, who ultimately decides that her mother's vanishing is an act of desperation. Despite Dr. Edwards' and Norma's efforts to keep Norman at Pineview, he is released and returns home.
38	8	"Unfaithful"	Stephen Surjik	Freddie Highmore	May 2, 2016	1.52
Romero stays away from the Bates house to help Norman adjust to a normal life. Norman soon tells him of plans to get a second job to pay for his own insurance in order to let Romero out of his arranged marriage to Norma. Romero tells her that Norman needs to be told that they're in love. Meanwhile, Rebecca is picked up at the airport by the DEA, but is told they are actually after Romero in connection with Bob Paris. At the Bates house, Norma, Romero and Norman have dinner together. Norman gets into an argument with his mother over her allowing Romero into their lives, when she and Norman were so close to the point of him not being able to have girlfriends. Norman storms out to chop wood in anger; Romero follows. Norman approaches him with the axe, but destroys a shed and proclaims that he hates Romero.
39	9	"Forever"	Tim Southam	Carlton Cuse & Kerry Ehrin	May 9, 2016	1.41
Romero tries unsuccessfully to convince Norma to recommit Norman into Pineview. Norman pours out his feelings to Dr. Edwards as Dylan and Romero secretly meet. They both are worried for Norma and want Norman back in the hospital. Dylan finds Audrey's earring and confronts Norma about it. Angered and blinded, Norma accuses Dylan of being jealous of Norman. Heartbroken, Dylan says that she has never been a mother to him, and tells her that Romero also wants Norman back in the hospital. Dylan says goodbye to Norman. Norma confronts Romero about going behind her back and ends their relationship. Norma then breaks down in front of Norman. She leaves a note for Romero and falls asleep. Norman lights the furnace and shuts all the vents in the house, causing carbon monoxide to fill Norma's room, in a murder-suicide attempt. Romero arrives and finds the two unconscious on the bed. He attempts to save both of them but is apparently unsuccessful in saving Norma, and he breaks into tears. Norman wakes to see his unresponsive mother.
40	10	"Norman"	Tucker Gates	Kerry Ehrin	May 16, 2016	1.50
As Norman is taken away by ambulance, Romero is questioned by a detective, who shows him Norma's note with the wedding ring in it. She mentions the possibility of Norma's attempt at murder-suicide, which sends Romero to collect Norman at the hospital. Norman balks, they scuffle and Romero promises to prove Norman killed his mother. The funeral home calls Norman to make arrangements. At the morgue, Romero places the ring on Norma's finger, and Norman later removes it at the funeral parlor. Romero goes to the service, which only Norman is attending. They scuffle again when Norman shows him the ring. Romero is later arrested by the DEA for perjury when he previously lied about being involved with Rebecca. Norman exhumes his mother's body to take home. Chick visits the house to offer condolences and sees Norma's body. He forces Norman to realize that she is dead. Norman goes to kill himself with Norma's handgun but hears music. He finds the house decorated for Christmas and "Mother" playing the piano.

== Reception ==
=== Critical response ===
The fourth season of Bates Motel has been met with critical acclaim. The season holds a 100% positive rating on review aggregator website Rotten Tomatoes, based on 17 responses from television critics.

=== Ratings ===
Overall, the fourth season of Bates Motel averaged 1.45 million viewers, with a 0.6 rating in the 18–49 demographic.

Viewership and ratings per episode of Bates Motel season 4
No.	Title	Air date	Rating/share (18–49)	Viewers (millions)	DVR (18–49)	DVR viewers (millions)	Total (18–49)	Total viewers (millions)
1	"A Danger to Himself and Others"	March 7, 2016	0.7	1.55	0.5	1.13	1.2	2.68
2	"Goodnight, Mother"	March 14, 2016	0.6	1.45	0.5	1.14	1.1	2.59
3	"'Til Death Do You Part"	March 21, 2016	0.6	1.46	0.4	0.92^{[A]}	1.0	2.38
4	"Lights of Winter"	March 28, 2016	0.6	1.52	0.6	1.22	1.2	2.73
5	"Refraction"	April 11, 2016	0.6	1.42	0.6	1.33	1.2	2.74
6	"The Vault"	April 18, 2016	0.5	1.33	0.6	1.22	1.1	2.55
7	"There's No Place Like Home"	April 25, 2016	0.5	1.35	0.6	1.27	1.1	2.61
8	"Unfaithful"	May 2, 2016	0.6	1.52	0.4	0.98^{[A]}	1.0	2.50
9	"Forever"	May 9, 2016	0.5	1.41	0.4	0.99	0.9	2.39
10	"Norman"	May 16, 2016	0.5	1.50	0.6	1.22	1.1	2.72

- A Cable Live +3 data is used here as Live +7 was not made available.

=== Awards and nominations ===
In its fourth season, Bates Motel was nominated for 17 awards, winning three.

Year	Awards	Category	Nominee(s)	Result	Ref.
2016	68th Primetime Creative Arts Emmy Awards	Outstanding Cinematography for a Single-Camera Series	John S. Bartley	Nominated	
2016	68th Primetime Creative Arts Emmy Awards	Outstanding Music Composition for a Series	Chris Bacon	Nominated	
2016	20th Online Film & Television Association Awards	Best Music in a Series	Chris Bacon	Nominated	
2016	7th Critics' Choice Television Awards	Most Bingeworthy Series	Bates Motel	Nominated	
2016	Gold Derby Awards	Best Drama Series	Bates Motel	Nominated	
2016	Gold Derby Awards	Best Lead Actor in a Drama	Freddie Highmore	Nominated	
2016	Gold Derby Awards	Best Lead Actress in a Drama	Vera Farmiga	Nominated	
2016	18th Women's Image Network Awards	Best Actress – Drama Series	Vera Farmiga	Nominated	
2016	Poppy Awards	Best Actress in a Drama Series	Vera Farmiga	Nominated	
2016	43rd People's Choice Awards	Favorite Cable TV Actress	Vera Farmiga	Won	
2016	43rd People's Choice Awards	Favorite Cable TV Actor	Freddie Highmore	Won	
2016	43rd People's Choice Awards	Favorite Cable TV Drama	Bates Motel	Won	
2016	Fangoria Chainsaw Awards	Best TV Actor	Freddie Highmore	Nominated	
2016	Fangoria Chainsaw Awards	Best TV Actress	Vera Farmiga	Nominated	
2016	43rd Saturn Awards	Best Action-Thriller Television Series	Bates Motel	Nominated	
2016	43rd Saturn Awards	Best Actor on Television	Freddie Highmore	Nominated	
2016	43rd Saturn Awards	Best Actress on Television	Vera Farmiga	Nominated	
The listed years are of television release, annual ceremonies are usually held the following year
