= Hillary Wolf =

American actor and judoka (born 1977)

- Born: Hillary Jocelyn Wolf; February 7, 1977 (age 49); Chicago, Illinois, U.S.
- Other name: Hillary Saba
- Education: University of Colorado Colorado Springs, Colorado College
- Occupations: Actress; judoka
- Years active: 1984–1992
- Spouse: Chris Saba (m. 2002)
- Children: 2

Hillary Jocelyn Wolf Saba (born February 7, 1977) is an American former child actress and judoka.

== Early life ==
Wolf was born Hillary Jocelyn Wolf on February 7, 1977 in Chicago, Illinois.

== Career ==
Wolf is best known for playing Megan, the sister of Kevin, who was portrayed by Macaulay Culkin, in the Home Alone series. She also starred as the lead character Laura in the film Big Girls Don't Cry... They Get Even, Holly Anderson in Murder Ordained, and as Emily in Waiting for the Light.

== Personal life ==
Wolf won the world judo championships for juniors in 1994 and represented the United States in judo at the 1996 Summer Olympics and the 2000 Summer Olympics. In 1996, she participated in the women's 48 kg competition and made it to the quarterfinals. In 2000, she was in the women's 52 kg competition and was out in the first round.

In 2002, Wolf married her husband Chris Saba. They currently live in Colorado Springs, Colorado with their two sons Michael and Dylan, who were born in 2007 and 2010. In 2004, the couple started a wrestling club called Rocky Mountain Wrestling Club which is also located in Colorado Springs.

== Filmography ==
Film
Year	Title	Role	Notes
1990	Waiting for the Light	Emily	
1990	Home Alone	Megan McCallister	
1992	Big Girls Don't Cry... They Get Even	Laura Chartoff	
1992	Home Alone 2: Lost in New York	Megan McCallister	

Television

Year	Title	Role	Notes
1984	A Matter of Principle	Lindy Lou Purdy	Television film
1985	First Steps	Missy (age 7)	Television film
1986	Help Wanted: Kids	Mickey	Television film
1986	Sunday Drive	Christine Franklin	Television film
1987	I'll Take Manhattan	Young Angelica Cipriani	Main role
1987	Murder Ordained	Holly Anderson	Television film
