= Bates Motel season 5 =

Season of television series

Bates Motel
- Season 5
- Promotional poster and home media cover art
- Starring: Vera Farmiga; Freddie Highmore; Max Thieriot; Olivia Cooke; Nestor Carbonell
- No. of episodes: 10

Release
- Original network: A&E
- Original release: February 20 – April 24, 2017

Season chronology
- ← Previous; Season 4

The fifth and final season of Bates Motel aired from February 20 to April 24, 2017. The season consisted of 10 episodes and aired on A&E. The series itself is described as a "contemporary prequel" to the 1960 film Psycho, following the life of Norman Bates and his mother Norma prior to the events portrayed in the Hitchcock film. The final season of the series loosely adapts the plot of Psycho. The series takes place in the fictional town of White Pine Bay, Oregon.

The season was released on Blu-ray and DVD on September 19, 2017.

== Cast and characters ==
=== Main ===
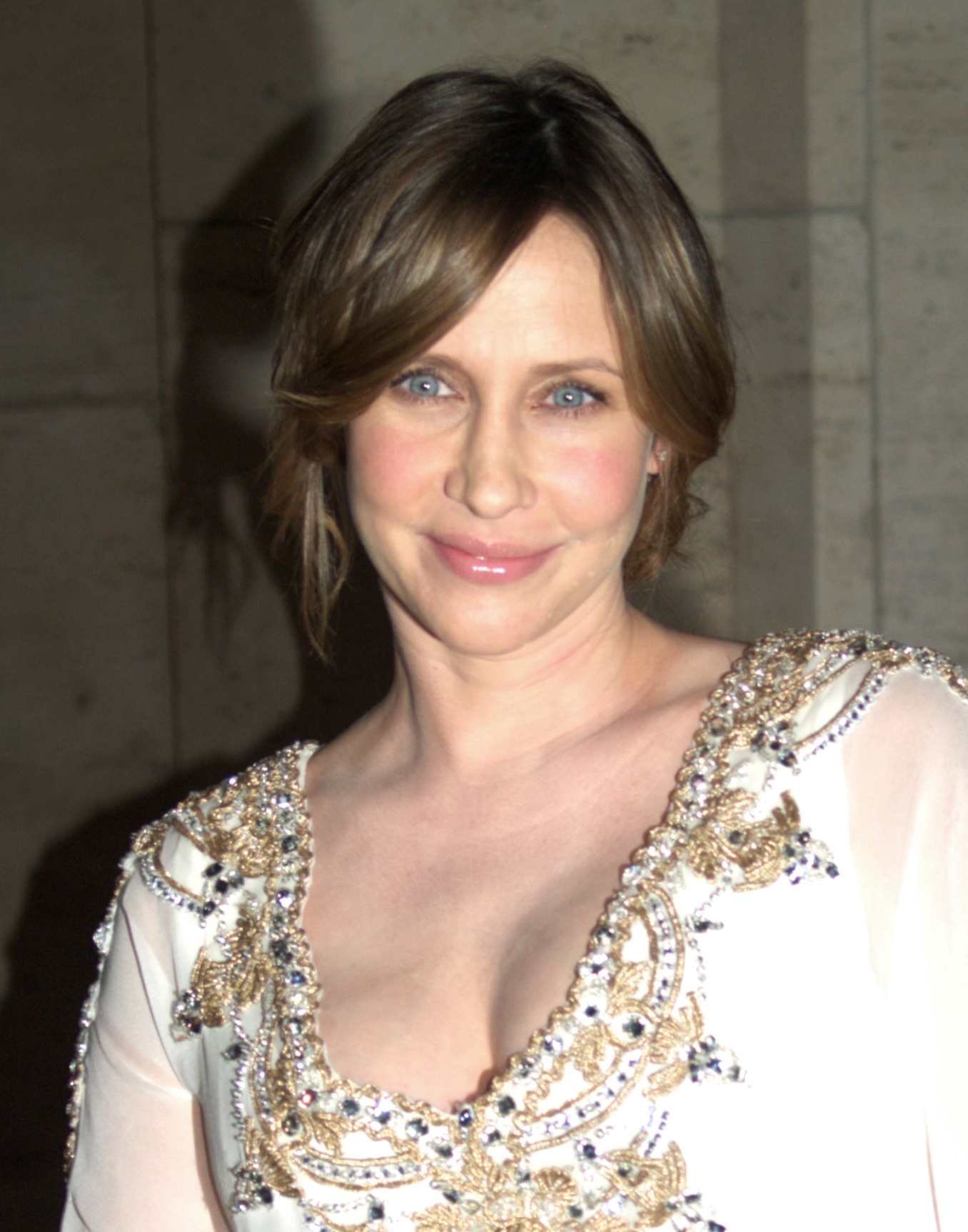
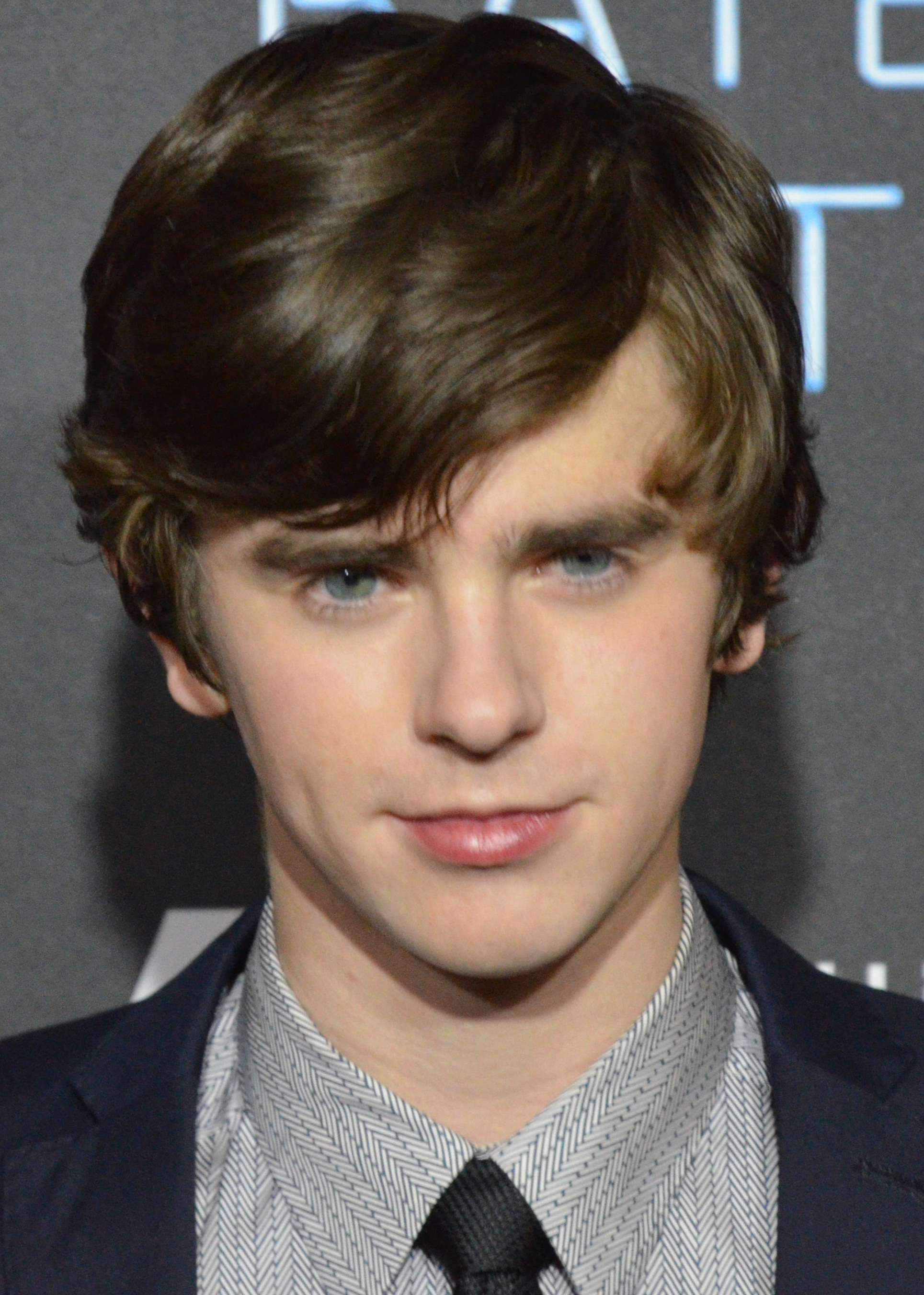
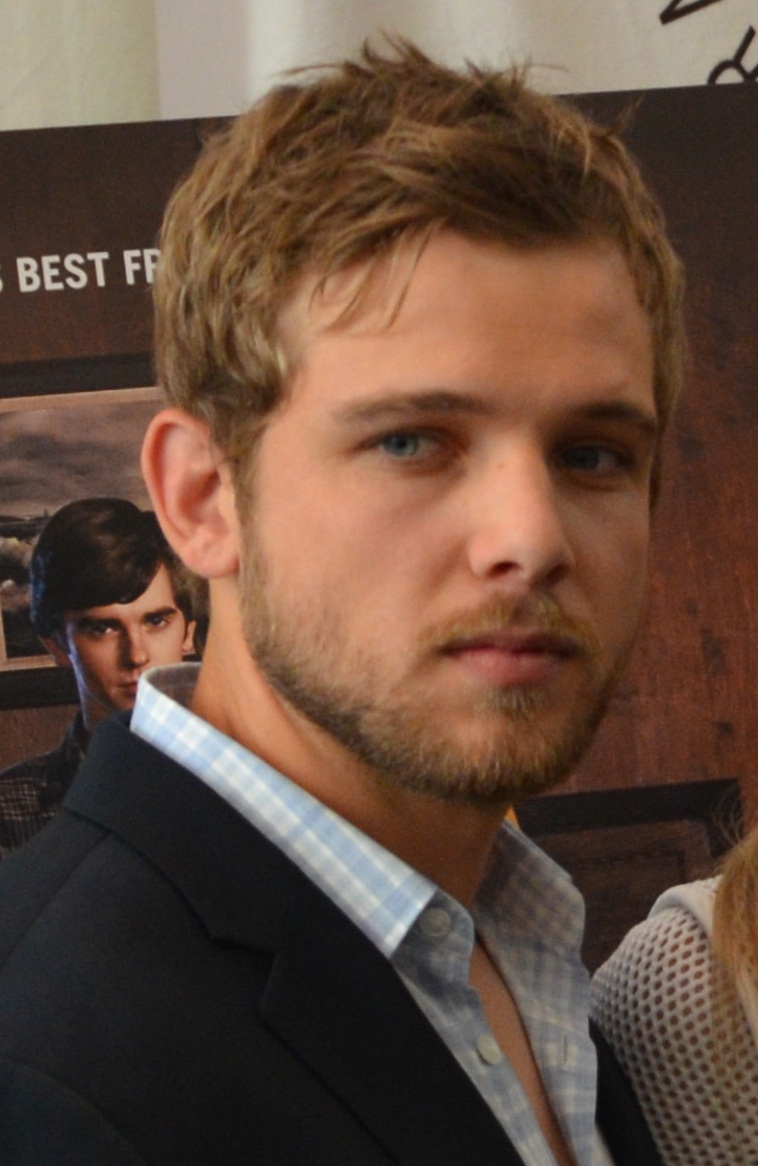
Vera Farmiga, Freddie Highmore, and Max Thieriot (left to right) portray Norma Louise Bates, Norman Bates, and Dylan Massett, respectively.
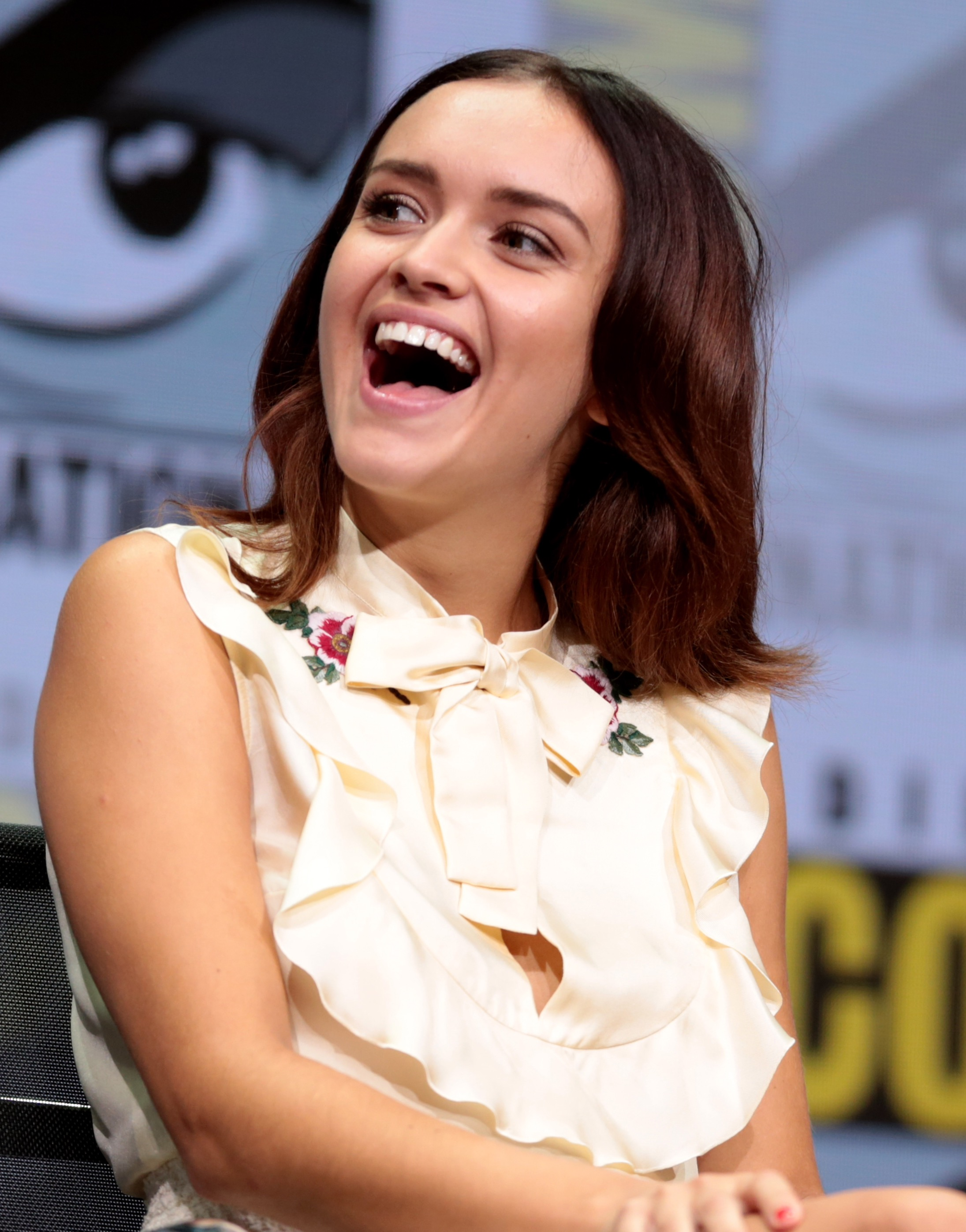
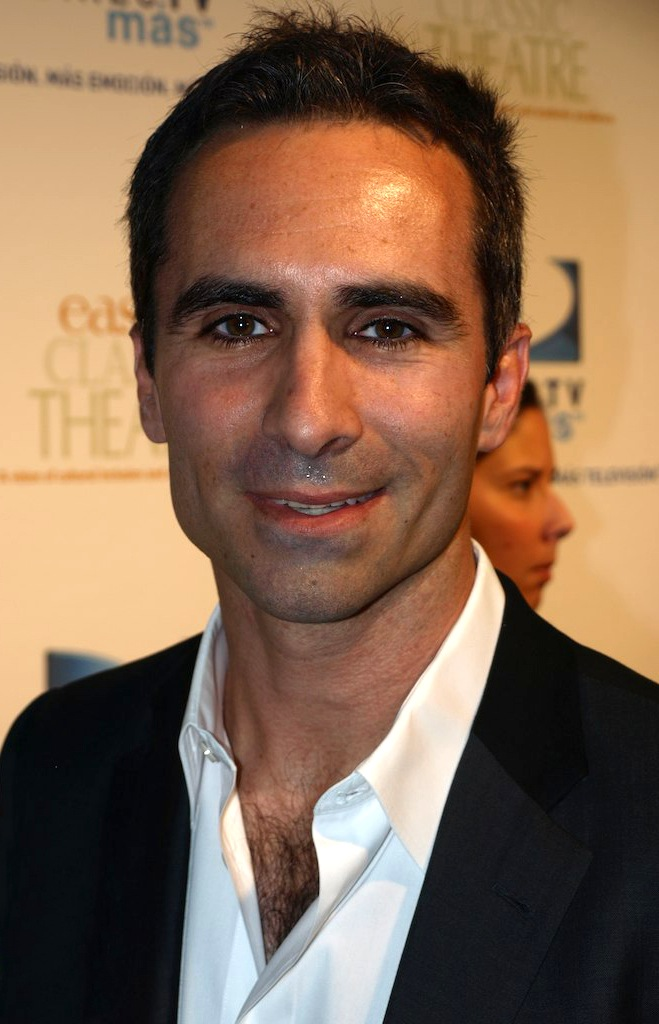
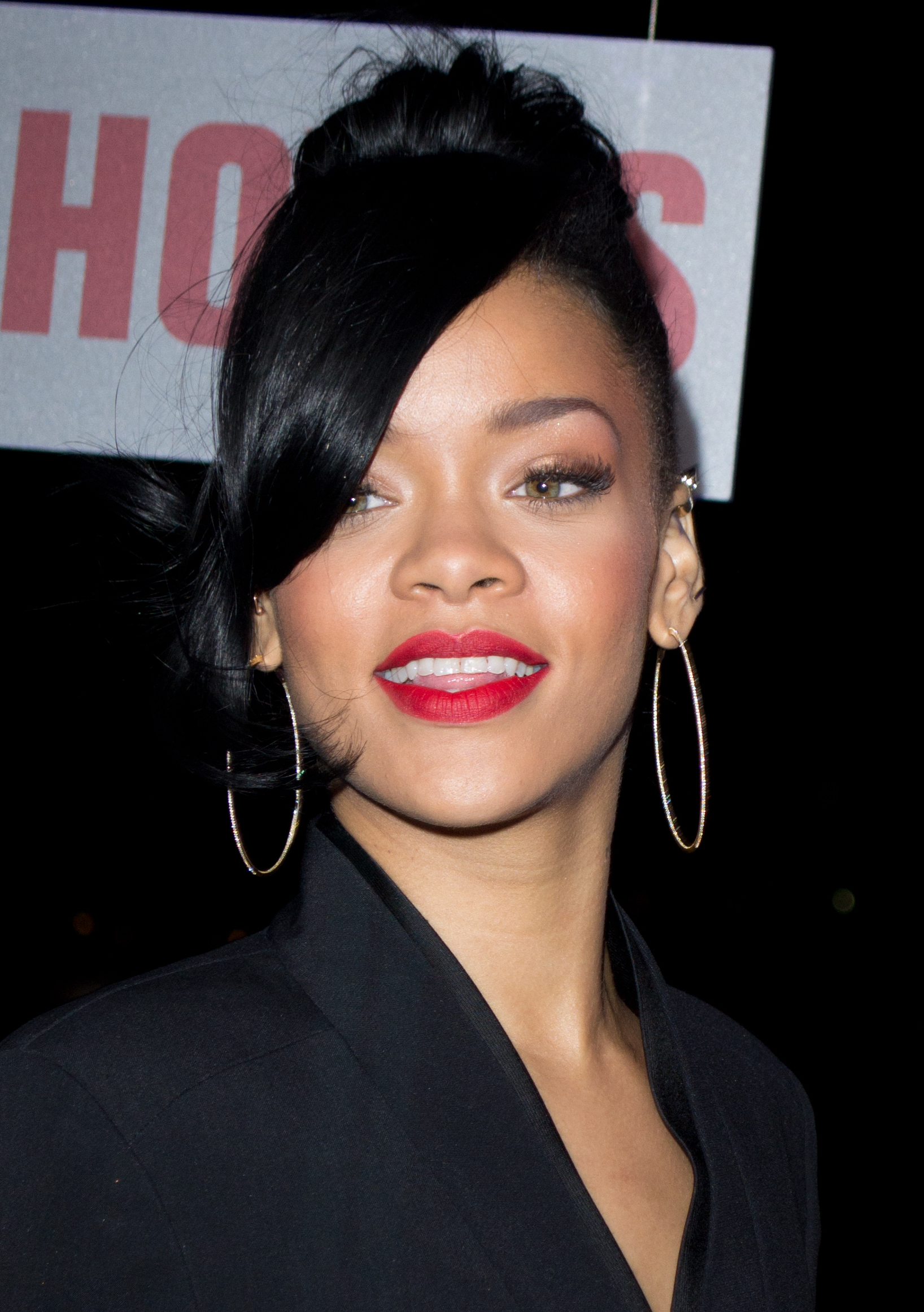
Olivia Cooke, Nestor Carbonell, and Rihanna (left to right) portray Emma Decody, Sheriff Alex Romero, and Marion Crane, respectively.
- Vera Farmiga as Mother
- Freddie Highmore as Norman Bates
- Max Thieriot as Dylan Massett
- Olivia Cooke as Emma Decody
- Nestor Carbonell as Alex Romero

=== Recurring ===
- Kenny Johnson as Caleb Calhoun
- Ryan Hurst as Chick Hogan
- Brooke Smith as Sheriff Jane Greene
- Isabelle McNally as Madeleine Loomis
- Austin Nichols as Sam Loomis
- Jillian Fargey as Maggie Summers
- Damon Gupton as Dr. Gregg Edwards
- Natalia Cordova-Buckley as Julia Ramos

=== Special guest ===
- Rihanna as Marion Crane

=== Guest ===
- Carlton Cuse as Highway Patrol Officer
- Raphael Sbarge as George Lowery
- John Hainsworth as Jim Blackwell
- Antonio Cayonne as Bruce Herman
- Ian Tracey as Remo

== Production ==
=== Casting ===
In June 2016, showrunner Kerry Ehrin confirmed the return of Kenny Johnson as Caleb Calhoun for the final season. The following month, Rihanna was cast in the iconic role of Marion Crane. In September, Isabelle McNally joined the cast of the series, portraying the role of Madeleine Loomis, a young woman who resembles Norma. The same month, Brooke Smith joined the cast as Sheriff Jane Greene. The following year in January, Austin Nichols was cast in the role of Sam Loomis, a prominent role in both the source material and the film adaptation. Ryan Hurst returned as Chick Hogan. The series executive producer Carlton Cuse appeared as a police officer trailing Marion Crane. Natalia Cordova-Buckley joined the cast as Julia Ramos, an attorney.

=== Filming ===
The series was filmed on location in Aldergrove, British Columbia. At the beginning of the first season, a replica of the original Bates Motel set from the film Psycho was built on 272nd Street. Freddie Highmore was tapped to write an episode for the season, as well as direct an episode, marking his directorial debut. Max Thieriot and Nestor Carbonell were also tapped to direct an episode each for season 5.

Production on the season began on September 16, 2016. The series filmed its final scenes at the specially-built Bates Motel set in Aldergrove on January 25, 2017, and production began tearing the house down the following day. Carbonell filmed his final scenes as Sheriff Alex Romero on January 27. Filming officially wrapped for the series on January 31. Later in February, the Bates Motel exterior set in Aldergrove was subsequently demolished.

== Episodes ==
No. overall	No. in season	Title	Directed by	Written by	Original release date	US viewers (millions)
41	1	"Dark Paradise"	Tucker Gates	Kerry Ehrin	February 20, 2017	1.34
It has been two years since the death of Norma. Norman is now living alone and running the Bates Motel. He stays with his hallucination, "Mother", whom he believes faked her death to the rest of the world, while he is secretly keeping Norma's preserved corpse in the basement. Meanwhile, Dylan and Emma are living in Seattle now married with an infant daughter, and are unaware of Norma's death. Caleb shows up, much to the stress of Dylan, so Emma asks Caleb to leave for Dylan's sake. Back in Pine Bay, Romero is in prison serving a five-year sentence and is denied parole. Romero sends a hitman to kill Norman, but Norman murders him instead. He meets Madeleine Loomis, a young hardware store-owner who resembles Norma. While "Mother" and Norman dispose of the hitman's body in a lake, the man's phone rings. Norman answers it to hear Romero's voice.
42	2	"The Convergence of the Twain"	Sarah Boyd	Alyson Evans & Steve Kornacki	February 27, 2017	1.28
Norman visits Romero in prison to taunt him and Romero warns that he will come for Norman. Later, Romero gets into a fight with another prisoner and is sent to the infirmary. Norman goes on a dinner date set up by Madeleine and her husband Sam, who is cheating on her. "Mother" follows Norman and asks why he is having dinner with a girl who looks like her. Meanwhile, Caleb returns to White Pine Bay, looking for Norma, but instead learns that Norma committed suicide over a year earlier. He breaks down with grief at her grave. Later, he and Chick have an altercation in a bar. Caleb says he knows Norman killed Norma, because she would never commit suicide, and vows to get revenge. He goes back to the Bates house and discovers Norma's corpse in the basement. Norman, dressed as "Mother", attacks Caleb. Chick witnesses this, shocked.
43	3	"Bad Blood"	Sarah Boyd	Tom Szentgyörgyi	March 6, 2017	1.28
Caleb wakes to find himself chained in the basement of the Bates house. Norman, as "Mother", visits him to recount their history. This causes Caleb to slowly lose his mind. Chick, now aware of Norman's mental condition, remains at the house to research his true-crime novel based on Norman. Madeleine admits her troubled marriage to Norman, and they become friends. Meanwhile, Romero is granted a transfer, following his prison fight. He escapes custody, only to be shot while trying to steal a car from a farm. "Mother" insists that Norman should kill Caleb, as she cannot do it. Norman sets Caleb free, but "Mother" chases him into the road, where a distracted Chick accidentally hits him with his car.
44	4	"Hidden"	Max Thieriot	Torrey Speer	March 13, 2017	1.25
Caleb dies from the accident and Chick cremates the body. The new sheriff is informed about Jim Blackwell skipping parole and questions Norman, as Blackwell had the house's address. Meanwhile, the fugitive Romero tends to his gunshot wounds before showing up at Maggie Summers' house. Chick tries to move into the Bates house, only to be turned away by Norman, who does not think Chick being there is a good idea. Norman and "Mother" continue to get into arguments, as Norman wants to have control over his own life. Madeleine invites Norman over to her house for dinner since Sam is out of town, and they start kissing. "Mother" appears and Norman visualizes Madeleine with her throat slit. He runs back home, calling for "Mother", who is not there.
45	5	"Dreams Die First"	Néstor Carbonell	Erica Lipez & Kerry Ehrin	March 20, 2017	1.36
Norman awakens the next morning to find no sign of his mother. Sheriff Greene pays Norman a visit informs him that Romero may come after him. In Seattle, Dylan explains to Emma why he cut off contact with Norma, revealing that Norman is sick and Emma's mother went missing after checking into the motel. Emma later discovers that Norma is dead. Back in Pine Bay, Sam's mistress, Marion Crane, goes on the run after stealing $400,000 from her boss; Madeleine confronts Sam about the affair. Elsewhere, Norman encounters his old therapist, Dr. Edwards, and is faced again with the reality that Norma is dead and he assumes her persona. He visits the White Horse Bar, and is confused when the patrons recognize him from the night before. A man attempts to seduce him and Norman has a flashback of "Mother" and the man having sex. Panicking, he flees home just as Marion arrives at the Bates Motel.
46	6	"Marion"	Phil Abraham	Carlton Cuse & Kerry Ehrin	March 27, 2017	1.30
Norman greets Marion at the motel. At the same time in Seattle, Emma informs a shocked Dylan of his mother's death. After Norman and Marion eat dinner together, Norman spies on her as she undresses for her shower. He later reveals to her that Sam is married. When Marion sees Sam and Madeleine arguing at his house, she smashes his car windows in anger and returns to the motel. "Mother" tries to goad Norman into killing Marion, but Norman, unwilling to do this, fights back and forces Marion out of the motel before he can hurt her, saving her life. Marion leaves town as Sam shows up at her room. He decides to shower while waiting for her. When "Mother" compares Sam to Norman's father, Norman stabs Sam to death in the shower.
47	7	"Inseparable"	Steph Green	Story by : Freddie Highmore & Erica Lipez; Teleplay by : Freddie Highmore	April 3, 2017	1.26
"Mother" and Norman dispose of Sam's body, though Norman does not want to hallucinate "Mother" anymore. Sheriff Greene reveals that Jim Blackwell's body was recovered. Norman buries Norma's frozen corpse in the woods in case police investigate his house. Dylan arrives at the Bates' house and says that Norman should have told him about Norma's death, and to let him help Norman, as he sees that Norman is sick. Dylan learns that Dr. Edwards is missing and presumed dead, even though Norman said he'd met with him. Dylan then meets Madeleine, who is worried about a missing Sam. Dylan asks Norman about Sam and encourages him to take his medication, but "Mother" takes over and tries to kill Dylan. Norman intervenes, yelling that Dylan is his brother, and Dylan, in shock, watches him struggle with himself. Norman comes to, dials 911, and confesses to Sam's murder.
48	8	"The Body"	Freddie Highmore	Erica Lipez	April 10, 2017	1.23
Norman is anxious to be arrested, fearing that he will see "Mother" and she will intervene. He is interrogated, and given his medication, but "Mother" forces him to vomit it out and takes full control of him. "Mother" blames Madeleine for Sam's murder and says Norman confessed to take the fall for her. Dylan gets a lawyer and explains that Norman is not a criminal nor a bad person - he is mentally ill and needs a mental institution. Emma's mother's body is also found and identified from the lake, confirming Dylan's suspicion about Norman killing her. Romero returns to the Bates' property and finds Chick, who has set up his writing desk in the house. Chick is killed by Romero after mocking him and the entire situation. Sam's body is found next, and Norman, with "Mother" still in control, is charged with three murders.
49	9	"Visiting Hours"	Olatunde Osunsanmi	Scott Kosar	April 17, 2017	1.22
Norman's attorney suggests entering an insanity plea, as he could be put to death if convicted. Emma arrives to see Dylan but is unsure whether the two of them will make it when Dylan takes his brother's side. After seeing the evidence presented at Norman's hearing, Madeleine asks Dylan how he can live with himself after knowing Norman was sick and still leaving him to do what he did. Emma decides to go back home, but not before going to see Norman. She instantly realizes he is in "Mother's" persona, and so asks him to tell the real Norman that she misses him. Romero discovers where Norman is and forces the officers to release him. He forces Norman into Norman's car and orders him to take them to Norma's body.
50	10	"The Cord"	Tucker Gates	Kerry Ehrin & Carlton Cuse	April 24, 2017	1.41
"Mother" leads Romero to Norma's body and as Romero mourns over it, Norman subdues him and shoots him with his own gun. Before Romero dies, he tells Norman that Norman will never be able to escape from the fact that he killed his own mother. "Mother" tells Norman that with Romero dead and now that he really knows the truth - that he killed her - there is nothing left to protect him from, and she leaves him for good. Unable to handle this, Norman's mind regresses to when they first moved to the motel. Under that delusion, he takes Norma's body back to the house and invites Dylan for dinner. Dylan does not inform the police. Instead, armed with a gun, he goes. After seeing Norma's corpse at the dinner table, Dylan begs Norman to face reality but Norman is unwilling to live without his mother. Dylan is forced to fatally shoot him when Norman charges at him with a knife. Norman dies in Dylan's arms and thanks Dylan for letting him reunite with Norma in death. The motel and house are sold, and Dylan and Emma make a happy life together with their daughter.

== Reception ==
=== Critical response ===
The season has received positive reviews from television critics. It received 81 out of 100 from Metacritic, based on 8 reviews, indicating "universal acclaim". Review aggregator website Rotten Tomatoes reported that 21 out of 21 critical responses were positive, averaging a 100% rating.

=== Ratings ===
Overall, the fifth season of Bates Motel averaged 1.29 million viewers, with a 0.5 rating in the 18–49 demographic.

Viewership and ratings per episode of Bates Motel season 5
No.	Title	Air date	Rating/share (18–49)	Viewers (millions)	DVR (18–49)	DVR viewers (millions)	Total (18–49)	Total viewers (millions)
1	"Dark Paradise"	February 20, 2017	0.5	1.34	0.5	1.19	1.0	2.53
2	"The Convergence of the Twain"	February 27, 2017	0.4	1.28	—N/a	—N/a	—N/a	—N/a
3	"Bad Blood"	March 6, 2017	0.5	1.28	0.5	1.31	1.0	2.60
4	"Hidden"	March 13, 2017	0.4	1.25	0.6	1.38	1.0	2.63
5	"Dreams Die First"	March 20, 2017	0.5	1.36	0.5	1.35	1.0	2.71
6	"Marion"	March 27, 2017	0.5	1.30	0.6	1.38	1.1	2.68
7	"Inseparable"	April 3, 2017	0.4	1.26	0.6	1.40	1.0	2.65
8	"The Body"	April 10, 2017	0.4	1.23	0.6	1.34	1.0	2.57
9	"Visiting Hours"	April 17, 2017	0.4	1.23	0.5	1.33	0.9	2.56
10	"The Cord"	April 24, 2017	0.5	1.41	0.4	—N/a	0.9^{[A]}	—N/a

- A Cable Live +3 data is used here as Live +7 was not made available.

=== Awards and nominations ===
In its fifth and final season, Bates Motel was nominated for one award.

Year	Awards	Category	Nominee(s)	Result	Ref.
2017	8th Critics' Choice Television Awards	Best Actor in a Drama Series	Freddie Highmore	Nominated	
The listed years are of television release, annual ceremonies are usually held the following year
