= Hometown (American TV series) =

1985 American television series

- Created by: Julie Kirgo; Dinah Kirgo
- Starring: Jane Kaczmarek; Franc Luz; Andrew Rubin; Margaret Whitton; John Bedford Lloyd; Christine Estabrook; Daniel Stern; Erin Leigh Peck; Donna Vivino; Mikey Viso
- Opening theme: "Sounds From My Hometown"
- Composer: Don Wilkins
- Country of origin: United States
- Original language: English
- No. of seasons: 1
- No. of episodes: 9

Production
- Executive producers: Julie Kirgo; Dinah Kirgo
- Running time: 60 minutes
- Production companies: Kirgette Productions; Paramount Television

Original release
- Network: CBS
- Release: August 22 – October 15, 1985

Hometown is an American comedy-drama television series that ran on CBS from August 22 to October 15, 1985. The series was a loose adaptation of the 1983 movie The Big Chill, and centered on the same premise as the film: a group of friends all in their 30s, who had reunited after traveling separate paths following their college days in the 1960s. Upon their reunion, they found that they were even more so an integral part of each other's lives in the 1980s. Julie and Dinah Kirgo served as executive producers, with Barnet Kellman directing most of the episodes. Hometown was produced by Kirgette Productions in association with Paramount Television.

== Synopsis ==
Set in Rye, New York, Hometown opened with the reunion of the seven former college friends, that took place at the wedding of two of them, the longtime couple of Mary Newell (Jane Kaczmarek) and Ben Abbott (Franc Luz). Amid all the nostalgia of radical times and the reminiscing of their youth, the group found their unwavering network of support was more important than ever, as they faced a more conservative, Reaganized America of the 1980s. Prior to the wedding, Mary and Ben had been living together for 13 years, had started a family of their own out of wedlock, and now were a modern yuppie couple raising young daughters Jennifer (Erin Leigh Peck) and Tess (Donna Vivino). Ben was a successful businessman, running a local bookstore in the city square, and Mary was on the heels of relaunching her long-abandoned dancing career.

All other series principals besides the Newell/Abbott family had now either re-established their ties with the town they all attended college in, or had remained there since college and had not seen their other friends in years. The most internationally known member of the group was Christopher Springer (Andrew Rubin), the wealthy rock star who had a troubled personal life (modeled after Bruce Springsteen). Chris decided to come back to his old hometown to regain the support from his old friends and to repair his problems, while intermittently going back on the road with his band. Completing the circle was Peter Kincaid (John Bedford Lloyd), a quirky college professor; elegant, recent divorcee Barbara Donnelly (Margaret Whitton), who currently lived off her vast settlements yet was insecure about moving on with her life and reentering the dating world; Jane Parnell (Christine Estabrook), also a college professor, but in addition serving as a presidential advisor to the White House; and Joey Nathan (Daniel Stern), who was more disheveled and less successful than his materialistic friends.

In the intervening years, Joey had settled into the job of a fry cook, and always proved to the gang that he was quite happy with his modest means. Joey was a single parent, raising young son Dylan (Mikey Viso), and at one point his paternity was even in question when Dylan's mother, Joey's ex-girlfriend, showed up with a DNA test. Joey's ex wanted to know who Dylan's father really was, so that if the results proved that someone else was in the picture, she could then possibly give her son a more suitable upbringing than what Joey could provide. In the ninth episode, Ben began his lobbying to run for city council, but nothing more of this development was explored, along with other plot twists, as Hometown was pulled from the CBS schedule permanently after that telecast.

Hometown was filmed in New York.

== Cast ==
- Jane Kaczmarek as Mary Newell Abbott
- Franc Luz as Ben Abbott
- Andrew Rubin as Christopher Springer
- Margaret Whitton as Barbara Donnelly
- John Bedford Lloyd as Peter Kincaid
- Christine Estabrook as Jane Parnell
- Daniel Stern as Joey Nathan
- Donna Vivino as Tess Abbott

== Episodes ==
No.	Title	Directed by	Written by	Original release date
1	"Pilot"	Unknown	Unknown	August 22, 1985
2	"Divorce Party"	John Pasquin	Unknown	August 29, 1985
3	"Joey's Ex-Wife"	Unknown	Unknown	September 5, 1985
4	"Peter's Play"	Unknown	Unknown	September 12, 1985
5	"Weekend in New York"	Unknown	Unknown	September 19, 1985
6	"Paternity"	Unknown	Unknown	September 24, 1985
7	"Mary's Yen"	Unknown	Unknown	October 1, 1985
8	"Nobody's Perfect"	Kim Friedman	George Kirgo	October 8, 1985
9	"Ben the Candidate"	Unknown	Unknown	October 15, 1985

== Scheduling ==
Hoping to give it a head start on its fall competition, CBS premiered Hometown a full month before the official start of the 1985–1986 season. Following reruns of the popular Simon & Simon on Thursday night (10:00 PM EST), the show had a promising premiere, ranking #23 among all network primetime series for that week. By episode five, despite the lead-in, the ratings for Hometown had fallen off considerably. The official beginning of the fall season prompted CBS to move the series to Tuesday at 8:00 PM EST on September 24, as Knots Landing was returning to the Thursday 10:00 slot. Hometown did not fare any better in the new time slot; in October, CBS quietly cancelled the series.

== Ratings ==
No.	Title	Air Date	Time	Rank	Rating	Viewers (Millions)
1	Pilot	August 22, 1985	Thursday at 10:00 P.M.	#23 of 60	13.8	11.8
2	Divorce Party	August 29, 1985	Thursday at 10:00 P.M.	#30 of 62	12.3	10.5
3	Joey's Ex-Wife	September 5, 1985	Thursday at 10:00 P.M.	#37 of 61	11.3	9.7
4	Peter's Play	September 12, 1985	Thursday at 10:00 P.M.	#45 of 61	11.2	9.6
5	Weekend in New York	September 19, 1985	Thursday at 10:00 P.M.	#47 of 58	11.3	9.7
6	Paternity	September 24, 1985	Tuesday at 8:00 P.M.	#62 of 64	7.9	6.7
7	Mary's Yen	October 1, 1985	Tuesday at 8:00 P.M.	#69 of 69	6.5	5.5
8	Nobody's Perfect	October 8, 1985	Tuesday at 8:00 P.M.	#62 of 63	9.1	7.8
9	Ben the Candidate	October 15, 1986	Tuesday at 8:00 P.M.	#66 of 67	7.9	6.8

Source: A.C. Nielsen Company via Los Angeles Times
