= A Bird of the Air =

- Film poster
- Directed by: Margaret Whitton
- Written by: Roger Towne
- Based on: The Loop by Joe Coomer
- Produced by: Steven Tabakin; Margaret Whitton
- Starring: Rachel Nichols; Jackson Hurst
- Cinematography: Philippe Rousselot
- Edited by: Sabine Hoffman
- Music by: David Majzlin
- Production company: Tashtego Films
- Distributed by: Paladin
- Release date: September 23, 2011 (limited)
- Running time: 98 minutes
- Country: United States
- Language: English

A Bird of the Air is a 2011 American romantic drama film directed by Margaret Whitton and starring Rachel Nichols and Jackson Hurst. It is based on the novel The Loop by Joe Coomer.

== Synopsis ==
Lyman is a highway worker who spends most of his days barely speaking due to his shyness and a past trauma. This changes when he meets Fiona, a peppy librarian that takes an immediate interest in him, and a parrot enters his trailer. They embark on a journey to find the parrot's original owner based on the words the parrot speaks.

== Cast ==
- Jackson Hurst as Lyman
- Rachel Nichols as Fiona
- Linda Emond as Margie
- Buck Henry as Duncan Weber
- Judith Ivey as Eleanor Reeves
- Gary Farmer as Charles Ballard
- Genia Michaela as Amber
- Anjanette Comer as Mrs. Weber
- Phyllis Somerville as Ivy Campbell
- Erik Jensen as Bearded Man
- Matte Osian as Trucker
- Rocco Sisto as Security Guard
- Louis Zorich as Stowalski

== Development ==
Plans to adapt Joe Coomer's novel The Loop were first announced in 2009, under the working title of The Loop. Rachel Nichols and Jackson Hurst were announced to perform as the two leads and would work from a script written by Roger Towne. Filming took place in New Mexico and Hurst's scenes were performed while he was on hiatus from the show Drop Dead Diva.

== Release ==
The film was released in limited theaters on September 23, 2011. It was then released on DVD, VOD and digital platforms on April 10, 2012.

== Reception ==
The film has a 30% rating on Rotten Tomatoes. Andrew Schenker of Slant Magazine awarded the film one and a half stars out of four. Jeannette Catsoulis of The New York Times was critical of the movie, as she felt that the two leads "display more chemistry with the film’s fauna than with each other."
