= Waiting for the Light =

- Theatrical release poster
- Directed by: Christopher Monger
- Written by: Christopher Monger
- Produced by: Caldecot Chubb; Ron Bozman
- Starring: Shirley MacLaine; Teri Garr; Clancy Brown; Vincent Schiavelli; John Bedford Lloyd; Colin Baumgartner; Hillary Wolf
- Cinematography: Gabriel Beristain
- Edited by: Éva Gárdos
- Music by: Michael Storey
- Production company: Epic Productions; Sarlui/Diamant
- Distributed by: Triumph Films
- Release date: November 2, 1990
- Running time: 94 minutes
- Country: United States
- Language: English
- Box office: $808,690

Waiting for the Light is a 1990 American comedy film written and directed by Christopher Monger and starring Shirley MacLaine, Teri Garr, Clancy Brown, Vincent Schiavelli, John Bedford Lloyd, Colin Baumgartner and Hillary Wolf. It was released on November 2, 1990, by Triumph Films.

== Plot ==
In the early 1960s Kay (Garr), a single mother, inherits a run-down diner in a small town in Washington State and gladly moves from Chicago to run it, taking her young son and daughter and her mentally unstable Aunt Zena (MacLaine), a former magician and vaudevillian who teaches the children magic tricks. Under her instruction they attempt to take revenge on the curmudgeonly neighbor (Schiavelli) who beat them with a belt for stealing his apples, by faking an apparition of an angry ghost. The trick goes awry and he thinks he has had a vision of an angel. Influenced by the tensions of the Cuban Missile Crisis, crowds flock to the town, making the diner prosper. The children feel very guilty, but the international crisis, the spiritual paradox of the fake vision, and Zena's stroke are all happily resolved in the finale of the film.

== Cast ==
- Shirley MacLaine as Aunt Zena
- Teri Garr as Kay Harris
- Clancy Brown as Joe
- Vincent Schiavelli as Mullins
- John Bedford Lloyd as Reverend Stevens
- Colin Baumgartner as Eddie
- Hillary Wolf as Emily
- Jeff McCracken as Charlie
- William Dore as Reverend Jones
- Robert Hardwick as Dr. Kelley
- Robin Ginsburg as Miss Hicks / Miss Berg
- Arthur H. Cahn as Mr. Patterson
- Matt Magnano as Tommy
- Mark Drusch as Mr. Trace
- Eric Helland as Bob
- Peg Phillips as Iris
- Kylee Martin as Bobby
- Jack McGee as Slim Slater
- Michael Marinelli as Tommy's Dad
- Don S. Davis as Dr. Norman
- Rob Keenan as Chuck
- Angela DiMarco as Meg
- Bob Henry as Judge Brown
- Ron Lynch as Hot Dog
- Jillayne Sorenson as Alice
- Corey Gunnestad as Verne

== Reception ==
The film grossed $334,748 in its opening weekend.
