= The Divide (TV series) =

American 2014 TV series

- Genre: Legal drama
- Created by: Richard LaGravenese; Tony Goldwyn
- Starring: Marin Ireland; Damon Gupton; Nia Long; Clarke Peters; Britne Oldford; Joe Anderson; Paul Schneider
- Country of origin: United States
- Original language: English
- No. of seasons: 1
- No. of episodes: 8

Production
- Executive producers: Andrew Sugerman; John Tinker; Richard LaGravenese; Tony Goldwyn
- Running time: 42–45 minutes
- Production company: AMC Studios

Original release
- Network: WE TV
- Release: July 16 – August 27, 2014

The Divide is a 2014 American legal drama television series created by Richard LaGravenese and Tony Goldwyn that aired on WE TV. The first season consisted of eight hour-long episodes. It premiered on July 16, 2014. On October 30, 2014, the series was canceled.

== Premise ==
An exploration of morality, ambition, ethics, politics and race in today's justice system as viewed through the eyes of an impassioned case worker and an equally passionate district attorney whose views vary.

== Cast ==
- Marin Ireland as Christine Rosa
- Paul Schneider as Clark Rylance
- Damon Gupton as Adam Page
- Nia Long as Billie Page
- Clarke Peters as Isaiah Page
- Jahmil French as Trey Page
- Britne Oldford as Jenny Butler
- Chris Bauer as Jared Bankowski
- Joe Anderson as Terry Kucik
- Adam Rothenberg as Danny
- Kenneth Welsh as Stanley Zale

== Development and production ==
The series was originally developed and ordered as a pilot in 2012 by sister network AMC, but was not picked up. It was, however, left in contention for a possible pickup at a later date. By the time WE TV had decided to pick up the show, David Manson, who was showrunner for the pilot, had moved to Netflix's House of Cards, with John Tinker ultimately stepping in as showrunner for the series.

== Episodes ==
No.	Title	Directed by	Written by	Original release date	US viewers (millions)
1	"The Ways Men Divide"	Tony Goldwyn	Story by : Richard LaGravenese & Tony Goldwyn; Teleplay by : Richard LaGravenese	July 16, 2014	0.488
2	"No Such Thing as Justice"	Tony Goldwyn	Richard LaGravenese	July 16, 2014	0.488
3	"Facts Are the Enemy"	Allison Anders	Story by : Felicia D. Henderson and Richard LaGravenese; Teleplay by : Richard LaGravenese	July 23, 2014	0.336
4	"Never Forget"	Janusz Kamiński	Story by : Dana Baratta; Teleplay by : Dana Baratta and Richard LaGravenese	July 30, 2014	0.285
5	"I'm for Justice"	Sarah Pia Anderson	Story by : Richard LaGravenese and Marcus Dalzine; Teleplay by : Richard LaGravenese	August 6, 2014	0.322
6	"And the Little Ones Get Caught"	Millicent Shelton	Pamela Gray	August 13, 2014	0.373
7	"I Can't Go Back"	Jann Turner	Story by : Theresa Rebeck; Teleplay by : Theresa Rebeck and Richard LaGravenese	August 20, 2014	0.327
8	"To Whom Evil Is Done"	Larysa Kondracki	Richard LaGravenese	August 27, 2014	0.280
