= Crystal Crag =

Rock formation in California, United States

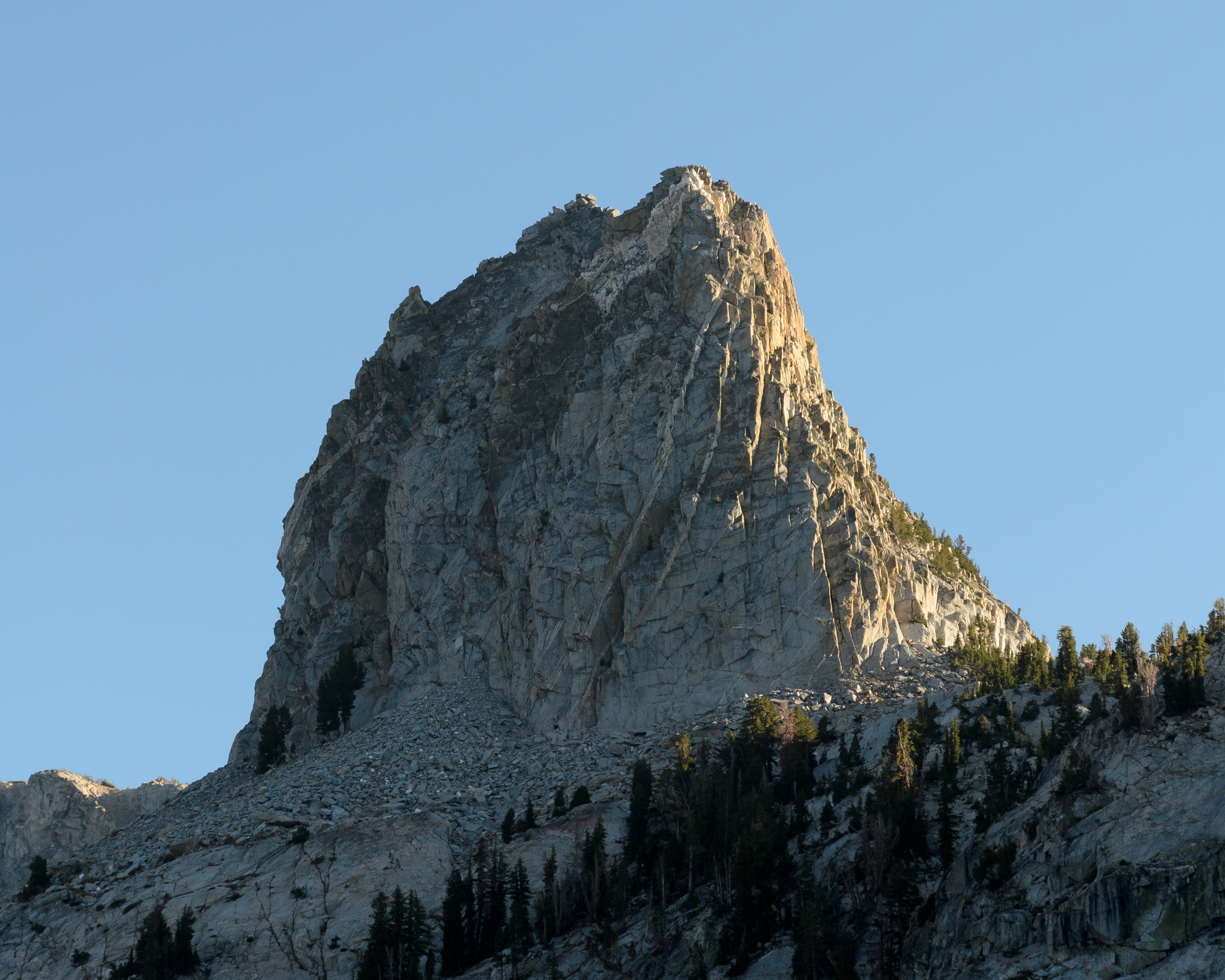
- North aspect

Highest point
- Elevation: 10,377 ft (3,163 m)
- Prominence: 338 ft (103 m)
- Parent peak: Mammoth Crest (11,515 ft)
- Isolation: 2.28 mi (3.67 km)
- Coordinates: 37°35′28″N 119°00′49″W

Geography
- Location within California Location within the United States
- Location: Mono County, California, U.S.
- Parent range: Sierra Nevada
- Topo map: USGS Crystal Crag

Geology
- Rock type: granite

Climbing
- First ascent: Unknown
- Easiest route: class 3

Crystal Crag is a 10,377-foot-elevation (3,163-meter) summit located in the Sierra Nevada mountain range in Mono County of northern California, United States. This photogenic landmark, popular with rock climbers, is situated approximately three miles south of the community of Mammoth Lakes, on land managed by Inyo National Forest. Topographic relief is significant as the north aspect rises 1,300 feet (400 meters) above Lake George in one-half mile. Crystal Lake lies below the west aspect and T J Lake below the east aspect. Precipitation runoff from the peak drains into these three lakes, thence north to Mammoth Creek. This mountain's toponym has been officially adopted by the United States Board on Geographic Names.

== Climbing ==
The first ascent of Crystal Crag is unknown but was likely before 1900.

The Northeast Face was climbed by Owen Williams on August 11, 1936. The North Buttress was climbed by Alvin McLane, John Houghton, and Reggie Donatelli on March 3, 1968. Galen Rowell and Vern Clevenger climbed the East Face in January 1973.

== Climate ==
Crystal Crag is located in an alpine climate zone. Most weather fronts originate in the Pacific Ocean, and travel east toward the Sierra Nevada mountains. As fronts approach, they are forced upward by the peaks (orographic lift), causing them to drop their moisture in the form of rain or snowfall onto the range.

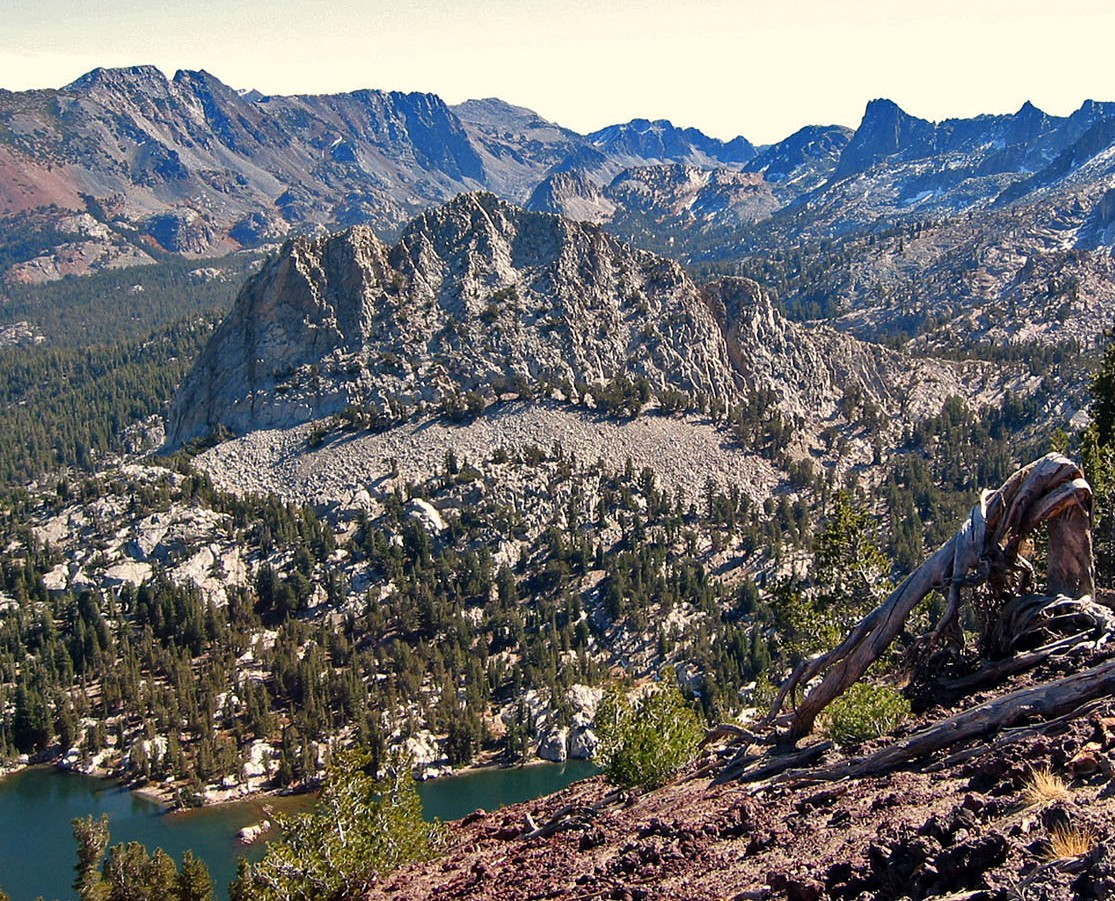
Crystal Crag seen from the east

== See also ==
- List of mountain peaks of California
- Herlihy Peak
