= Kay O'Brien =

American medical drama television series

- Genre: Medical drama
- Created by: Brad Markowitz; Bryce Zabel; William Asher
- Starring: Patricia Kalember; Brian Benben; Jan Rubeš; Lane Smith; Priscilla Lopez
- Composer: Mark Snow
- Country of origin: United States
- Original language: English
- No. of seasons: 1
- No. of episodes: 13 (5 unaired)

Production
- Executive producer: William Asher
- Producer: Peter Katz
- Running time: 60 minutes
- Production companies: Asher-Whitehead Productions; Orion Television

Original release
- Network: CBS
- Release: September 25 – November 13, 1986

Kay O'Brien is an American medical drama television series set at fictional Manhattan General Hospital, which aired for one season on CBS from September 25 to November 13, 1986, during the 1986-87 television season.

== Overview ==
The series stars Patricia Kalember as Dr. Kay "Kayo" O'Brien. CBS had high hopes for this multi-racial medical drama, but it received low ratings and was cancelled after airing just 8 episodes.

Lifetime bought the rights to the entire series, and has occasionally aired all 13 episodes.

== Premise ==
28-year old Kay O'Brien, known to all as "Kayo", is a surgical resident in a New York hospital and, like most residents, she has too many patients, not enough sleep time and one too many superiors on her tail. To cap it all, her live-in partner, Sam, has moved out taking the stereo with him.

== Cast ==
- Patricia Kalember as Dr. Kay "Kayo" O'Brien
- Brian Benben as Dr. Mark Doyle
- Jan Rubeš as Dr. Joseph Wallach
- Lane Smith as Dr. Robert Moffit
- Priscilla Lopez as Rosa Villanueva, RN
- Keone Young as Dr. Michael Kwan
- Tony Soper as Dr. Cliff Margolis

== Episodes ==
No.	Title	Directed by	Written by	Original release date
1	"Kayo to Call"	Richard Michaels	Bryce Zabel & Brad Markowitz	September 25, 1986
A second-year surgical resident deals with patients and staff at a Manhattan hospital.
2	"Don't Bother Kayo It's Chinatown"	Michael Caffey	Brad Markowitz & Bryce Zabel	October 2, 1986
A Chinatown merchant is wounded in a shootout and needs a kidney transplant, and his brain-dead assailant may be the only suitable donor; Kayo's parents breeze into town.
3	"Big Vacation"	Michael Vejar	Story by : Deborah Amelon Huddy; Teleplay by : Stephen Zito	October 9, 1986
Kayo treats two emergency patients: a young woman who refuses surgery for religious reasons, and a terminally ill photojournalist who wants to get the most out of his remaining days.
4	"Taking the Heat"	Richard Compton	Daniel Freudenberger	October 16, 1986
Rosa spots a potential problem with a doctor's orders and Kayo later supports the doctor.
5	"A Foreign Concept"	Lorraine S. Ferrera	Bryce Zabel & Brad Markowitz	October 23, 1986
Wallach's best friend suffers a mild stroke but insists he doesn't need to be hospitalized; misunderstandings abound with a Sri Lankan physician anxious to learn about American surgery techniques.
6	"Lesson Learned"	Michael Vejar	Robert Earll	October 30, 1986
Kayo turns to an old friend for consolation after losing a patient; Cliff becomes the object of ridicule among his peers; Moffitt considers a position with another institution.
7	"Princess of the City"	Richard A. Colla	Cliff Gould	November 6, 1986
A wealthy suitor brings excitement to Kayo's social life, while a stern pediatrician frustrates her life at the hospital; a psychiatrist takes an unusual interest in Cliff's genes.
8	"Dollars and Sense"	Michael Vejar	Kimmer Ringwald	November 13, 1986
A street punk dukes it out with Doyle after the doctor insults his ailing mother; a male nurse learns there are drawbacks to dating Dr. O'Brien.
9	"Behind Closed Doors"	Michael Caffey	Bill Taub	UNAIRED
The ER is quarantined, which prevents Kayo from going to her sister's wedding, detains Doyle's accountant and jeopardizes a sick runaway.
10	"Wreck the Halls"	TBD	TBD	UNAIRED
A department-store explosion creates a major disaster as patients are rushed to Manhattan General during the midst of the Christmas season.
11	"Little White Lies"	Robert Becker	William Driskill	UNAIRED
Cliff puts a patient's life at risk when, concentrating more on his social life than on work, he fails to prescribe an essential medication, and Kayo takes the blame.
12	"Reunion"	Robert Becker	Kimmer Ringwald	UNAIRED
Kayo faces a dilemma in obstetrics: whether to save the life of her patient or the patient's unborn child.
13	"Stop and Smell the Linen"	Michael Vejar	Cynthia Darnell	UNAIRED
A workaholic clothing designer refuses treatment after collapsing at the hospital; without official sanction, Nat sets up shop in the linen closet to sell imported goods.
