= Bloody Mountain (California) =

Mountain in California, United States

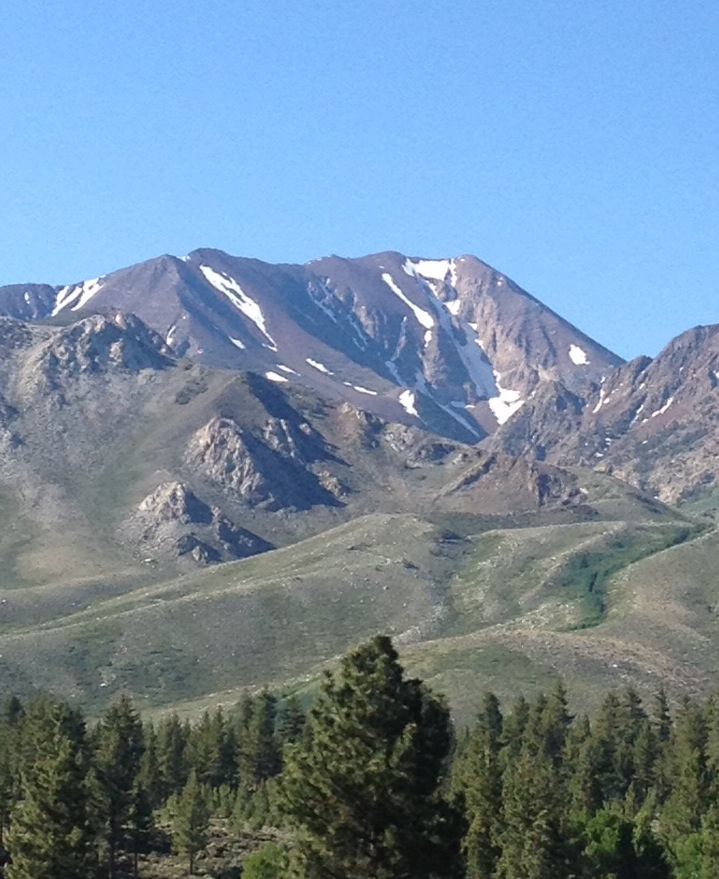
- Bloody Mountain, Mammoth Lakes, CA, US. Shot from the North (Highway 203)

Highest point
- Elevation: 12,558 ft (3,828 m) NAVD 88
- Prominence: 1,234 ft (376 m)
- Listing: Mountains of California
- Coordinates: 37°33′38″N 118°54′25″W

Geography
- Location within California Location within the United States
- Location: Mono County, California, U.S
- Parent range: Sierra Nevada
- Topo map: USGS Bloody Mountain

Climbing
- First ascent: July 3, 1928 by Norman Clyde

Bloody Mountain is located in the Sierra Nevada 1 mile South East of Mammoth Lakes (Mono County) in eastern California in the southwestern United States.

== History ==
The origin of the name Bloody Mountain is unclear. Some hold it was named for the color of the rocks of the mountain, while others believe it was named for a bloody skirmish between the sheriff and escaped convicts in 1871.
