= Patricia Kalember =

American actress

- Born: December 30, 1956 (age 69); Schenectady, New York, USA
- Education: Indiana University (BA); Temple University (MFA)
- Occupation: Celebrity
- Years active: 1981 - present
- Spouses: Mark Torres (m. 1980; div. 1983) Daniel Gerroll (m. 1986)
- Children: 3

Patricia Kalember (born December 30, 1956) is an American actress, best known for her role as Georgiana "Georgie" Reed Whitsig in the NBC drama series Sisters (1991 - 1996). Patricia Kalember also had the leading roles in a number of television films, co-starred in the feature films, including Fletch Lives (1989), Jacob's Ladder (1990), A Far Off Place (1993), Signs (2002), The Company Men (2010), and Limitless (2011), and recurring roles in thirtysomething (1989 - 1991) and Law & Order: Special Victims Unit (2004 - 2010).

== Early life and education ==
Patricia Kalember was raised in Westport, Connecticut, and Louisville, Kentucky. She received her BA in Theater from Indiana University and a MFA from Temple University. Patricia Kalember has been married to British actor Daniel Gerroll since 1986. They have three children. She was previously married to Mark Torres, an actor.

== Career ==
Patricia Kalember made her television debut in 1981, on the daytime soap opera Texas. She later was a regular cast member on Loving. She was nominated for an Outer Critics Circle Award for her performance in the play The Foreigner (1986). In 1986, she had the leading role in the short-lived CBS drama series, Kay O'Brien. She also starred alongside Tim Matheson in the short-lived ABC sitcom Just in Time (1988). From 1989 to 1991, she appeared in a recurring role on thirtysomething.

Patricia Kalember may be best known for her role as Georgiana "Georgie" Reed Whitsig in the NBC drama series, Sisters, alongside Swoosie Kurtz, Sela Ward, and Julianne Phillips, from 1991 to 1996. She later had the leading roles in a number of made-for-television films. Patricia Kalember had roles in such films as Cat's Eye (1985), Fletch Lives (1989), Jacob's Ladder (1990), Big Girls Don't Cry... They Get Even (1992), and A Far Off Place (1993).

She played the role of Margaret Craig McNamara in the HBO biographical film Path to War (2002) and appeared as Mel Gibson's character's wife in the science-fiction thriller, Signs that same year. She had guest roles on such television series as Touched by an Angel, Gossip Girl, The Good Wife, Blue Bloods, and Orange Is the New Black. Kalember played two different characters in Law & Order: Special Victims Unit; in 2001, she appeared in an episode of the second season, and from 2004 to 2010, she played Judge Karen Taten. Patricia Kalember co starred in such films as The Girl in the Park, The Company Men, Rabbit Hole, and Limitless.

== Filmography ==
=== Film ===
Year	Title	Role	Notes
1985	Cat's Eye	Marcia	
1988	Little Girl Lost	Andrea Newman	Television film
1989	Fletch Lives	Amanda Ray Ross	
1990	Kaleidoscope	Alexandra	Television film
1990	Jacob's Ladder	Sarah	
1992	Big Girls Don't Cry... They Get Even	Barbara	
1993	A Far Off Place	Elizabeth Parker	
1993	Shattered Trust: The Shari Karney Story	Linda Karney	Television film
1995	The Unspoken Truth	Margaret Trainor	Television film
1995	Degree of Guilt	Judge Caroline Masters	Television film
1996	Angel Flight Down	Teresa Bagshaw	Television film
1997	Home Before Dark	Dolores James	
1998	When Husbands Cheat	Tess McCall	Television film
1999	Jump	Mother	
1999	Final Run	Connie Phipps-Singer	Television film
2000	Killing Cinderella	Cinderella	
2000	Labor Pains	Delia	
2000	A Time for Dancing	Sandra Michaels	
2002	Path to War	Margaret Craig McNamara	
2002	Signs	Colleen Hess	
2003	Straight from the Heart	Laurie Woods	Television film
2004	Fatal Lessons: The Good Teacher	Samantha Stephens	Television film
2007	Ben's Plan	Shelly Stephens	
2007	The Girl in the Park	Amanda	
2010	The Company Men	Cynthia McClary	
2010	Rabbit Hole	Peg	
2010	Kalamity	Terry Klepack	
2011	Limitless	Mrs. Atwood	
2012	Girl Most Likely	Virginia	
2015	Run All Night	Rose Maguire	
2016	Custody	Wendy Fisher	
2020	Morning Into Night	Delilah	Short film

=== Television ===
Year	Title	Role	Notes
1981	Texas	Meredith	Episode: "1.339"
1983 - 1984	Loving	Merrill Vochek	Series regular
1985	Brass	Lori Cartwright	TV pilot
1985	The Equalizer	Carlene Randall	Episode: "The Equalizer" (Pilot)
1986	Kay O'Brien	Dr. Kay 'Kayo' O'Brien	Series regular, 13 episodes
1987	The Equalizer	Dr. Stephanie Davis	Episode: "Coal Black Soul"
1988	Just in Time	Joanna Farrell	Series regular, 6 episodes
1988	ABC Afterschool Special	Maria Acero	Episode: "Date Rape"
1989 - 1991	thirtysomething	Susannah Hart	Recurring role, 15 episodes
1991 - 1996	Sisters	Georgiana 'Georgie' Reed Whitsig	Series regular, 127 episodes
1997	Early Edition	Dr. Price	Episode: "Love Is Blind"
1997	Michael Hayes	Dr. Claire Solomon	Episode: "The Doctor's Tale"
2001	Law & Order: Special Victims Unit	Leslie DeSantis	Episode: "Folly"
2002	Touched by an Angel	Janice Lowry	Episode: "Secreets and Lies"
2004 - 2010	Law & Order: Special Victims Unit	Judge Karen Taten	Recurring role, 10 episodes
2008	Gossip Girl	Mrs. Boardman	Episode: "There Might be Blood"
2010	The Good Wife	Julie Bowers	Episode: "Painkiller"
2011	Weekends at Bellevue	Lucinda	TV pilot
2011	Blue Bloods	Dr. Keller	Recurring role, 3 episodes
2012	White Collar	Ms. Holloman	Episode: "Judgment Day"
2013 - 2018	Orange Is the New Black	Marka Nichols	Recurring role, 4 episodes
2014 - 2019	Madam Secretary	Senator Kate Fletcher	4 episodes
2014	Olive Kitteridge	Joyce	HBO miniseries; Episode: "Incoming Tide"
2015	Allegiance	NCS Director	2 episodes
2015 - 2020	Power	Kate Egan	
2015	Veep	Sarah	Episode: “Mommy Meyer”
2017 - 2018	The Tick	Joan	11 episodes
2018	The Blacklist	Anna Hopkins	Episode: "The Invisible Hand (No. 63)"
2019	Elementary	Erika Vanderwey	Episode: "The Latest Model"
2022 - present	Power Book IV: Force	Kate Egan	Supporting role
2023	Power Book II: Ghost	Kate Egan	Episode: Divided We Stand
