= Deadline (2000 TV series) =

American TV series (2000–2001)

- Genre: Drama
- Created by: Dick Wolf
- Developed by: Robert Palm
- Starring: Oliver Platt; Hope Davis; Bebe Neuwirth; Lili Taylor; Damon Gupton; Christina Chang
- Composer: Mike Post
- Country of origin: United States
- Original language: English
- No. of seasons: 1
- No. of episodes: 13

Production
- Executive producers: Dick Wolf; Robert Palm; Don Scardino; Arthur W. Forney; Peter Jankowski; Oliver Platt
- Producer: John L. Roman
- Running time: 60 minutes
- Production companies: Wolf Films; Studios USA Television

Original release
- Network: NBC
- Release: October 2, 2000 – April 7, 2001

Deadline is an American drama television series created by Dick Wolf, that aired on NBC from October 2, 2000, to April 7, 2001. It stars Oliver Platt as Wallace Benton, star columnist for the fictional New York Ledger, a daily tabloid newspaper seen in many episodes of Law & Order and modeled after the real-life New York Post.

== Cast ==
- Oliver Platt as Wallace Benton
- Bebe Neuwirth as Nikki Masucci
- Tom Conti as Si Beekman
- Lili Taylor as Hildy Baker
- Hope Davis as Brooke Benton
- Damon Gupton as Charles Foster
- Christina Chang as Beth Khambu

== Production ==
Series creator Dick Wolf hired Robert Palm as head writer and executive producer. Palm had worked for years as a newspaper reporter on The Hartford Times and the Los Angeles Herald Examiner before moving into screenwriting with jobs on Miami Vice. He and Wolf had worked together previously on the tenth season of Law & Order. They didn't want to do another "cop show" and agreed on one with journalism as its focus. In 1999, Wolf pitched the show to NBC with Oliver Platt as its star and sold it with a three-minute trailer, instead of producing a pilot, as is the norm. Wolf and Palm worked with NBC Entertainment President Garth Ancier on developing the show with Platt in mind. Wolf invited director Michael Ritchie to direct episodes of Deadline but Ritchie had to drop out for personal reasons. Producer John L. Roman had previously worked with Wolf on Exiled and DC. (They would later work together on Law & Order: Criminal Intent and Chicago Fire.)

Plots for the show were based on true stories from newspaper articles that Palm and Wolf found. Richard Esposito, a New York newspaper veteran of 20 years, was hired as a consultant on the show. He worked with the actors and writers on outlines of stories and on "everything that helps them get a feel for the tone and pace of a newspaper." He also introduced Platt and other cast members to journalists around the city.

Platt had been approached numerous times to do a television show but it was Wolf's reputation and the chance to work in his hometown and be close to his family that persuaded him. Wallace Benton was modeled on veteran New York journalist Jimmy Breslin, Mike McAlary, and other New York tabloid columnists. To research the role, Platt spent time with crime reporters Phil Messing of the New York Post, Lenny Levitt of Newsday, and Juan Gonzalez and Jim Dwyer of the New York Daily News. The actor went out on stories with them, watched them interview and listened to them work the phones. During lunches, he said, he "got them to tell me their trade secrets."

The New York Ledger's offices were constructed at the old New York Post building on South Street in New York City. The set design for the offices was based on old black-and-white photographs of the Post offices. The newspaper allowed the producers to shoot the pilot episode in its old offices and then agreed to a short-term lease through November 2000. Shooting started in mid-July 2000 and the first episode debuted on October 2. Deadline was scheduled to air Mondays at 9 pm opposite ABC's Monday Night Football and Fox's Ally McBeal.

== Episodes ==
No.	Title	Directed by	Written by	Original release date	Prod. code	Viewers (millions)
1	"Pilot"	Don Scardino	Story by : Dick Wolf; Teleplay by : Dick Wolf & Robert Palm	October 2, 2000	E1501	14.30
2	"Lovers and Madmen"	Constantine Makris	Yahlin Chang	October 9, 2000	E1506	10.90
3	"Perception"	Bob Balaban	Chris Mundy	October 16, 2000	E1507	10.00
4	"Daniel in the Lion's Den"	Don Scardino	Willie Reale	October 23, 2000	E1503	7.00
5	"Howl"	James Quinn	Martin Weiss	October 30, 2000	E1511	6.80
6	"The Old Ball Game"	David Platt	Robert F. Campbell & Jonathan Greene	March 17, 2001	E1510	N/A
7	"Don't I Know You?"	Richard Dobbs	Story by : Dick Wolf & Robert Palm; Teleplay by : Willie Reale	March 17, 2001	E1508	N/A
8	"The Undesirables"	Matthew Penn	Yahlin Chang	March 24, 2001	E1515	N/A
9	"Somebody's Fool"	Michael Fields	Story by : Dick Wolf & Robert Palm & Willie Reale; Teleplay by : Willie Reale	March 24, 2001	E1516	N/A
10	"The First Commandment"	James Quinn	Matt Prudence & Michael Berns	March 31, 2001	E1504	N/A
11	"Just Lie Back"	Constantine Makris	Story by : Liz Friedman & Vanessa Place; Teleplay by : Robert Palm & Liz Friedman & Vanessa Place	March 31, 2001	E1513	N/A
12	"Shock"	Robert Berlinger	Story by : Dick Wolf; Teleplay by : Eva Nagorski	April 7, 2001	E1509	N/A
13	"Red Herring"	Alexander Cassini	Story by : Robert Palm; Teleplay by : Martin Weiss & Robert Palm	April 7, 2001	E1502	N/A

== Reception ==
Variety magazine praised Platt's work on the show in their review: "Platt, best-known for his work on the big screen, is a colorful choice for Benton, and, judging from the first episode, he can carry the bulk of the action." USA Today criticized the show's authenticity in their review: "The only thing accurate about Deadline is the sense of urgency implied by the title. Someone had better fix this show fast, before it becomes yesterday's news." The Boston Globe found fault with some of the characters on the show: "Benton's merry band of journalism students are silly, and the show should replace them with an expanded cast of Ledger co-workers."

The pilot episode was seen by 14.3 million viewers but the show's ratings declined steadily afterwards with 6.8 million viewers watching the last episode. NBC cancelled the show after five episodes. NBC showed the remaining episodes during the spring of 2001, in at least one part of the United States; they followed the network's broadcasts of Saturday night XFL football games in the western time zones.
