= Joe Coomer (author) =

American novelist

- Born: Joseph Alan Coomer; November 3, 1958 (age 67); Fort Worth, Texas, U.S.
- Education: University of Kentucky; University of Texas at Arlington; Southern Methodist University
- Occupation: Writer
- Spouses: Heather Hutton (m. 1986; div. 2000) Isabelle Tokumaru (m. 2003)
- Writing career
- Genres: Fiction; non-fiction

Joe Coomer, born Joseph Alan Coomer, is an American fiction and nonfiction writer who lives outside of Fort Worth, Texas, and in Stonington, Maine. Born November 3, 1958, in Fort Worth, Texas, Coomer attended the University of Kentucky between 1977 and 1979 and subsequently attended the University of Texas at Arlington a single semester. He completed his undergraduate degree at Southern Methodist University in 1981.

Coomer wrote his first books while working at his family's lumber yard and working several part-time jobs. His first novel, The Decatur Road, won the Jones Fiction Prize from the Texas Institute of Letters in 1984. The book originated as three short stories created for his senior thesis project.

He married Heather Hutton, whom he had met in Taos, New Mexico, in 1986. They were wed in the Coomer family compound on the site of a home they were building. The couple established two antique malls in the Dallas-Fort Worth area shortly after they wed. They divorced in 2000.

He married Isabelle Tokumaru, an artist and art conservator, in Maine in 2003.

Coomer spends his winters in Springtown, Texas, where he runs three large antique malls; Azle Antique Mall, Burleson Antique Mall and Azle Maine Antique Barn [2014]. He lives in a fairly new Victorian house that he spent a year and a half building in the late eighties, a project he wrote about in Dream House [1991]. His current wife, Isabelle Tokumaru, runs her paintings conservation practice in the third story, while he writes novels in the kitchen, where the food is close. Summers, they live in Stonington, Maine, an active fishing village on the coast. When the weather's nice, he takes his old motor sailer, "Yonder", on day sails and cruises down east. He chronicled her purchase, restoration, and his stupidities at sea in Sailing in a Spoonful of Water [1997]."

In 2012, Coomer donated his papers—reflecting his works created between 1977 and 2011—to the DeGolyer Library at Southern Methodist University. The university requested these and also published a 30th anniversary edition of The Decatur Road.

== Bibliography ==
- The Decatur Road, St. Martin's Press, 1983, winner of the Jones Fiction Prize from the Texas Institute of Letters
- Kentucky Love, St. Martin's Press, 1985, in which the lead character returns to the Appalachian hills to work on his grandfather's farm and looks back on his life and a love affair.
- A Flatland Fable, Texas Monthly Press, 1986
- Dream House, Faber & Faber, 1991, in which he describes the building of his home in Texas
- The Loop, Faber & Faber, 1992, which was a New York Times Book of the Year in 1993 and feature film as A Bird of the Air, shown on 1 screen September 25, 2011
- Sailing in A Spoonful of Water, Picador, 1997, about restoring a 1934 motorsailer and learning to sail on the coast of Maine
- Beachcombing for A Shipwrecked God, Graywolf Press, 1997
- Apologizing to Dogs, Scribner, 1999
- One Vacant Chair, Graywolf Press, 2003, winner of the S. Mariella Gable Prize
- Pocketful of Names, Graywolf Press, 2005
