= List of Unhappily Ever After episodes =

The following is a list of episodes for The WB sitcom Unhappily Ever After. The series premiered on January 11, 1995, and aired a total of 100 episodes during its five season run. The series' final episode aired on May 23, 1999.

== Series overview ==
Season	Episodes	Originally released	
Season	Episodes	First released	Last released
1	13	January 11, 1995	May 17, 1995
2	22	September 6, 1995	May 22, 1996
3	22	September 8, 1996	May 18, 1997
4	21	September 7, 1997	May 10, 1998
5	22	September 13, 1998	May 23, 1999

== Episodes ==
=== Season 1 (1995) ===
No. overall	No. in season	Title	Directed by	Written by	Original release date	Viewers (millions)
1	1	"Pilot"	Gerry Cohen	Ron Leavitt & Arthur Silver	January 11, 1995	2.7
When Jennifer and Jack Malloy's marriage ends, Jennie is left with the house and the kids and Jack is left out in the cold - with a talking toy bunny named Mr. Floppy that only he can hear.
2	2	"Gift of the Magnovox"	Gerry Cohen	Sandy Sprung & Marcy Vosburgh	January 18, 1995	2.8
When Jennie invites her almost-ex to an anniversary dinner, he is convinced that she is trying to cook up a reconciliation, but she just wants his VCR.
3	3	"Jack's First Date"	Sam W. Orender	Kimberly Young-Silver	January 25, 1995	2.9
Jennie decides to teach Jack a lesson when he asks Ryan's teacher on a date.
4	4	"The Bigger They Are, the Harder They Fall"	Gerry Cohen	Sandy Sprung & Marcy Vosburgh	February 1, 1995	2.4
Jennie's plan to sell her engagement ring to finance breast-enlargement surgery is a bust when she discovers her precious diamond is a fake.
5	5	"Jack the Ripper"	Gerry Cohen	J. Stewart Burns	February 8, 1995	2.8
Jack has a run-in with Maureen when he takes a reckless ride on his moped.
6	6	"Run"	Gerry Cohen	Christina Lynch	February 15, 1995	3.1
Jack decides to run for the border after his flu-ridden family runs him all over town attending to their needs.
7	7	"The Descent of Man"	Linda Day	Dave Caplan & Brian LaPan	February 22, 1995	2.9
Ryan and Ross move in with Dad after he urges them to boycott "women's work" at home.
8	8	"Boxing Mr. Floppy"	Gerry Cohen	Gabrielle Topping	March 1, 1995	2.5
A family feud ensues when Ross decides to cut off Mr. Floppy's foot for luck.
9	9	"Don Juan De Van Nuys"	Linda Day	Arthur Silver	March 15, 1995	2.5
When a handsome housepainter does not put the moves on Jennie, she worries she is no longer attractive and looks to Jack for reassurance.
10	10	"Mistress Jennie"	Gerry Cohen	Sandy Sprung & Marcy Vosburgh	March 22, 1995	2.7
Jennie asks Jack to help her get out of the affair she is having with a married man.
11	11	"Daddy's Little Girl"	Gerry Cohen	Christina Lynch	May 3, 1995	2.4
Jennie and Jack regret letting Tiffany spend the night with her friends, including a male one.
12	12	"The Great Depression"	Gerry Cohen	J. Stewart Burns	May 10, 1995	2.3
Tiffany turns to her parents for help when she loses her school's dance fund in a bad investment scheme.
13	13	"Hoop Dreams"	Gerry Cohen	Al Aidekman	May 17, 1995	3.0
Jennie embarrasses the entire family when she is asked to give a speech at Ryan and Tiffany's school.

=== Season 2 (1995–96) ===
No. overall	No. in season	Title	Directed by	Written by	Original release date	Viewers (millions)
14	1	"Jack Moves Back"	Gerry Cohen	Arthur Silver	September 6, 1995	3.0
Jack moves back into the house for the kids' sake, but must live in the basement until he gets Jennie back.
15	2	"Zit Could Happen to You"	Gerry Cohen	Marcy Vosburgh	September 13, 1995	3.2
When Tiffany gets a pimple and Ryan sets the scale to 10 pounds more than normal, Tiffany tries to develop a personality and Jennie starts jogging. Jennie becomes Vicky Vixen on the Internet and Ryan finds that Vicky Vixen has the hots for him.
16	3	"The Rat"	Sam W. Orender	J. Stewart Burns	September 20, 1995	3.4
Jack leaves Jennie's room for the basement because she will not let him have his way, but he finds a giant rat in the basement and makes the kids get rid of it.
17	4	"Rocky VI"	Sam W. Orender	Dave Caplan & Brian LaPan	September 27, 1995	3.5
Jennie gets into a fight with neighbor Susan, and drags Jack into fighting Susan's husband Vic.
18	5	"Rock Star"	Gerry Cohen	Christina Lynch	October 4, 1995	3.8
When Jennie gets a date with her teen crush, Ray Paul Jones, she gives Jack the right to fantasize about a celebrity; he picks Cindy Crawford and gets arrested for stalking her.
19	6	"Driving Me Crazy"	Gerry Cohen	Kimberly Young	October 11, 1995	3.8
Disasters occur when Jack teaches Ryan and Tiffany how to drive.
20	7	"A Touch of Glass"	Sam W. Orender	Marcy Vosburgh	October 25, 1995	3.8
Jennie gets a glass table on Ross's ninth birthday and throws everyone out of the house for getting the table dirty.
21	8	"A Line in the Sand"	Gerry Cohen	Arthur Silver	November 8, 1995	4.1
When the family earns 40,000 frequent-flyer miles, Jack wants to go to Las Vegas and Jennie wants to go to Hawaii; Tiffany gets into a fight with Ryan's cheap crush Patty.
22	9	"Making the Grade"	Gerry Cohen	J. Stewart Burns	November 15, 1995	3.8
When Ryan gets all Ds and Fs on his report card, Jennie says he cannot have the car keys until he gets a B, so he makes a deal with his civics teacher Miss Taylor; Jack tries to figure out why Ryan is so dumb, and Tiffany suspects the mailman is her father.
23	10	"Honey, I Screwed Up the Kids for Life"	Sam W. Orender	Christina Lynch	November 22, 1995	3.0
Tiffany thinks Jack does not trust her when he does not let her boyfriend Mike into her room.
24	11	"The Whiz Kid"	Gerry Cohen	Marcy Vosburgh	November 29, 1995	3.2
When Ryan starts taking urine tests for football players, he gets a lettered jersey and a football player's respect; with Ryan on the football team, nobody notices Tiffany when she gets the highest SAT scores in the school and becomes a National Merit Scholar.
25	12	"Hot Wheels"	Gerry Cohen	Christina Lynch	December 20, 1995	5.1
When Tiffany and Ryan take Jack's car to a party without his permission, Jack and Jennie pretend the car is stolen, but then learn it actually is. Ryan and Tiffany get caught, and Ryan gets severely punished while Tiffany escapes responsibility.
26	13	"Picnic of Pain and Peril"	Gerry Cohen	Marcy Vosburgh	January 10, 1996	4.0
After seeing a movie, Jennie takes the family on a picnic to bond - but the trip is ruined by gophers, poison ivy, and pesticide.
27	14	"Meter Maid"	Sam W. Orender	J. Stewart Burns	January 31, 1996	3.7
Jack is mistakenly thrown in jail when Jennie punches a meter maid; Jennie will not bail Jack out and things are terrible around the house without him.
28	15	"In the Stars"	Sam W. Orender	Sandy Sprung & Marcy Vosburgh	February 7, 1996	3.3
When the family becomes obsessed with horoscopes, Ryan looks for a girl and Jennie tries to be nice.
29	16	"Mr. No"	Linda Day	Christina Lynch	February 14, 1996	3.4
Tiffany is disturbed when Danny does not want to go to the Valentine's Dance with her. Ryan plans to take his chemistry teacher Ms. O'Hara, but she blows herself up; Mr. Floppy sends obscene mail to Pamela Anderson.
30	17	"The Agony of Victory"	Gerry Cohen	Arthur Silver	February 21, 1996	3.7
Jack uses his height to beat Ryan at basketball for the 2,001st time.
31	18	"All About Jennie"	Gerry Cohen	Gabrielle Topping	February 28, 1996	3.4
Jennie relives her high-school days when Tiffany is cast as Juliet in Romeo and Juliet. Jack helps Ryan practice his one line for the play.
32	19	"Jack Writes Good"	Gerry Cohen	Matt Leavitt	May 1, 1996	2.9
Jack starts writing stories that are really Floppy's and gets a big break, but later tries doing his own writing.
33	20	"Girls Who Wear Glasses"	Gerry Cohen	Christina Lynch	May 8, 1996	3.5
Tiffany is not the smartest girl in the class anymore when she is put into a smarter class.
34	21	"Leaving Van Nuys"	Linda Day	Bobcat Goldthwait & Allan Trautman	May 15, 1996	3.5
It is the summer after Ryan finishes senior year. After he gets fired from the used-car lot, Jack threatens to kick him out of the house if he does not get a job, so Ryan goes to Cheeseburger Community College, but finds he must repeat senior year. Jack tries to keep the family out of the basement and works the night shift to avoid dealing with the kids.
35	22	"Getting More Than Some"	Linda Day	J. Stewart Burns	May 22, 1996	2.6
On Jack's advice, Ryan becomes engaged to Crystal, a 30-year-old woman with two kids. Note: Joey is portrayed by Matthew Cox, Nikki's real-life brother, who makes the first of his three (unrelated) appearances on the series.

=== Season 3 (1996–97) ===
No. overall	No. in season	Title	Directed by	Written by	Original release date	Viewers (millions)
36	1	"Tiffany's Rival"	Linda Day	Arthur Silver	September 8, 1996	4.2
Sable, a girl as smart and beautiful as Tiffany, comes to Priddy High in the new school year, and she and Tiffany become rivals after exchanging secrets.
37	2	"Beach Party"	Howard Murray	Christina Lynch	September 15, 1996	4.6
On a school "ditch day," Tiffany competes with Sable for surfer Moondoggie; Jennie does not want to be home when the maid comes, so she asks sick Jack to take her to the beach.
38	3	"Angel Gone Bad"	Howard Murray	Marcy Vosburgh	September 22, 1996	4.3
Tiffany jeopardizes her Princeton scholarship by taking fake prom pictures with nerds and leaving sexy messages on their answering machines for money.
39	4	"The Temptation of Jack"	Linda Day	Kimberly Young	September 29, 1996	4.7
Jennie makes Jack go talk to Sable's mother Morgana, who tries to seduce him; Ryan becomes Sable's boyfriend but feels more like her slave.
40	5	"Lightning Boy"	Linda Day	J. Stewart Burns	October 6, 1996	5.7
After getting struck by lightning, Ryan is convinced that he is superhero Lightning Boy.
41	6	"Bingo! Bingo! Bingo!"	Linda Day	Marcy Vosburgh	October 13, 1996	4.0
Jack gets lonely when Jennie gets Tiffany addicted to bingo.
42	7	"Halloween XXVII" "Hair Stalker"	Linda Day	Christina Lynch	October 27, 1996	5.2
The Mad Hair Hacker stalks Tiffany, Sable, and Amber to chop off their long hair; Jack and Jennie look forward to terrorizing the neighborhood kids and giving them candy cigarettes on Halloween.
43	8	"Rock and Roll"	Linda Day	J. Stewart Burns	November 3, 1996	4.0
Ryan gets angry when Tiffany changes his band and they become a success; Mr. Floppy starts going into the washer to get into alternate worlds.
44	9	"The Pride of the Injuns"	Gerry Cohen	Matt Leavitt	November 10, 1996	4.6
When Sable starts playing a sport for her scholarship, Tiffany joins the volleyball team.
45	10	"Eating Hollywood"	Linda Day	Christina Lynch	November 17, 1996	4.7
Jennie expects to see stars when the family visits the House of Hollywood restaurant, but she only sees Erik Estrada, whom she does not recognize.
46	11	"High and Dry"	Linda Day	Marcy Vosburgh	November 24, 1996	4.4
Jack and Jennie think Ryan is on drugs when they finds globs of his sweat in the car.
47	12	"The Tell-Tale Lipstick"	Gerry Cohen	J. Stewart Burns	December 15, 1996	4.1
Deciding to do something bad, Tiffany steals some lipstick and becomes a rebel.
48	13	"Sternberg" "Steinfeld"	Linda Day	Lisa Moricoli	January 19, 1997	5.18
When Tiffany stops dating an actor, he offers the whole family parts in his TV show.
49	14	"The President"	Gerry Cohen	Gabrielle Topping	February 2, 1997	4.40
After Tiffany nominates Ryan for school president, he makes rules that benefit himself; Jack and Jennie must do Ryan's homework so he can maintain a C-average.
50	15	"Tiffany on the Wild Side"	Howard Murray	Arthur Silver	February 9, 1997	4.09
Jack cannot cope when Tiffany starts dating biker Johnny Stompanado; Jennie remembers her biker boyfriend.
51	16	"The Potato Rebellion"	Gerry Cohen	Sandy Sprung	February 16, 1997	3.92
Ryan, Tiffany, and their friends protest against the school's disgusting mashed potatoes. Jack suffers from insomnia.
52	17	"B-Minus Blues"	Linda Day	Christina Lynch	February 23, 1997	4.60
Tiffany gets a B− on her essay because she does not agree with her teacher Mr. Monteleone's opinion while Ryan repeats everything Mr. Monteleone says for his report and does well. Jack and Mr. Floppy want to make a movie with naked women.
53	18	"From Russia with Love"	Sam W. Orender	Marcy Vosburgh	April 20, 1997	3.97
Ryan gets a mail-order bride.
54	19	"Little Ice Cream Shop of Horrors"	Patrick Maloney	Marcy Vosburgh	April 27, 1997	3.94
Tiffany must work at an ice cream parlor.
55	20	"Shampoo"	Gerry Cohen	J. Stewart Burns	May 4, 1997	3.00
Tiffany's advice causes Ryan to get lots of women at his new job as a hairdresser. Jack worries that Ryan is gay because of his new job, but respects him when he sees the women he is getting.
56	21	"College!"	Linda Day	J. Stewart Burns & Christina Lynch	May 11, 1997	3.69
Jack goes to a loan shark for the $18,000 Tiffany needs to attend Harvard, but she decides to go to Northridge Junior College with Ryan when she meets Professor Alfred, a professor there. Then she finds that Professor Alfred is going to teach at Harvard and Mr. Monteleone is taking his spot.
57	22	"The Joy of Meat"	Howard Murray	Arthur Silver	May 18, 1997	3.78
Ross makes the family become vegetarians so he can win an environmentalist award and a $10,000 check, but Tiffany will not give in.

=== Season 4 (1997–98) ===
No. overall	No. in season	Title	Directed by	Written by	Original release date	Viewers (millions)
58	1	"Hot Off the Presses"	Linda Day	Christina Lynch	September 7, 1997	3.59
Tiffany becomes the gossip writer for the school newspaper and writes a story about Mr. Monteleone loving sheep.
59	2	"Experimenting in College"	Howard Murray	J. Stewart Burns	September 14, 1997	2.79
For class projects, Tiffany pretends to be stupid around a guy and Ryan acts like a girl.
60	3	"The Ghost and Mr. Malloy"	Howard Murray	Marcy Vosburgh	September 21, 1997	3.56
Guy Macaroon tells the family that Jennie has died by falling asleep on a tanning machine, so they must give her a good funeral to stop her ghost from pestering them.
61	4	"Exorcising Jennie"	Patrick Maloney	J. Stewart Burns	September 28, 1997	2.59
When Jennie's ghost continues to pester the family, they call Father Guido Sarducci to perform an exorcism.
62	5	"We Got Next"	Howard Murray	Arthur Silver	October 5, 1997	3.90
Mindy, a girl on the basketball team with a crush on Ryan, beats him at basketball. Ryan is embarrassed when Mindy tells the whole school, so he challenges her to a rematch with the school watching.
63	6	"Sorority Girl"	Patrick Maloney	Marcy Vosburgh	October 12, 1997	3.82
To join a sorority, Tiffany and Amber must be Ryan's slaves. Seeing Ryan and Tiffany enjoy college, Jack lists "college graduate" on his resume and becomes a doctor and an accountant.
64	7	"Ryan Vampire Slayer"	Andrew Susskind	J. Stewart Burns	October 26, 1997	2.84
After Bunny Mufflewits rejects him, Ryan becomes a vampire-slayer and uses Tiffany and Ross for bait.
65	8	"Cyber-Tiffany"	Linda Day	Marcy Vosburgh	November 2, 1997	2.97
Tiffany is arrested when Ryan uses her name and picture for his Internet cybersex scam.
66	9	"Tiffany, the Home Wrecker"	Linda Day	Christina Lynch	November 9, 1997	3.71
When Tiffany breaks up a couple by asking the guy for the time, she starts to think he is her boyfriend, without meeting him. Ryan starts getting sympathy from girls who have been dumped.
67	10	"Little Miss Perfect"	Gerry Cohen	Christina Lynch	November 16, 1997	3.88
Ryan meets a cute girl named Bitsy Berg who actually likes him, but she is way too perky and cannot stop talking in a fast, ditzy voice. The rest of the family hates her, but Ryan things she could be "the one" But it turns out Ryan was just one of a long list of men she had to sleep with as part of a sorority initiation.
68	11	"The One Kevin's Directing"	Kevin Connolly	Kimberly Young	November 23, 1997	3.96
When Barbara, the attractive new girl at Northridge Junior College who is a network executive, flirts with Jack, Jennie and Tiffany tell him to flirt back so they can get a network meeting.
69	12	"Teacher of the Year"	Patrick Maloney	Arthur Silver	December 14, 1997	3.11
Tiffany decides to present Teacher of the Year Mr. Peebody (Richard Sanders) with dinner at her house, then learns that he is an escaped murderer.
70	13	"Ryan's Labour Lost"	Linda Day	Gabrielle Topping	January 11, 1998	3.19
Working as night janitor to pay for the school computer he destroyed, Ryan finds the answers to an exam in the trashcan and starts selling them to other students.
71	14	"Undercover Cheerleader"	Andrew Susskind	Marcy Vosburgh	January 18, 1998	3.22
After writing a report on Ryan cheating on a test, Tiffany goes undercover as one of the cheerleaders to expose them for her paper.
72	15	"The Chaste Makes Waste"	Kevin Connolly	Marcy Vosburgh	February 1, 1998	4.10
Tiffany plans to lose her virginity to her new boyfriend, then discovers he is saving himself for marriage.
73	16	"Teacher's Pet"	Wendy Neckels	J. Stewart Burns	February 8, 1998	4.49
Ryan's career-aptitude test reveals that he should be a teacher, so he becomes the student-teacher in Ross's class. When he accidentally stabs the teacher, Mr.Moss, to death with scissors, he takes over the class. Ross' girlfriend, 12-year-old Kitty, gets a crush on Ryan, so he has Tiffany pretend to be his girlfriend.
74	17	"Let's Get Ready to Rum Ball"	Harriette Regan	Christina Lynch	February 15, 1998	3.83
When Tiffany goes on a weekend ski trip and wakes up in bed and tied up with her skis, she tries to think back to what happened, while Ryan says that he beat up the Abominable Snowman. Meanwhile, Ross witnesses Jack and Jennie having a high old time while Tiffany and Ryan are away.
75	18	"Triple Play"	Gerry Cohen	J. Stewart Burns	February 22, 1998	4.68
After making an unassisted triple-play in baseball, Ryan stars in many commercials, making money and gaining fame.
76	19	"Tiffany's Birthday"	Geoff Pierson	Christina Lynch	April 26, 1998	3.86
When Tiffany turns 20, she remodels her room and thinks she is old while Jack and Jennie fight over which is her favorite parent.
77	20	"The Old West"	Linda Day	Mark O'Keefe	May 3, 1998	3.84
When Tiffany finds an Old-West book while planting flowers, she wonders what living in those times was like.
78	21	"The Clip Show"	Linda Day	Christina Lynch	May 10, 1998	3.61
When Ross nails the front door shut to make everyone except Jennie watch his 5-hour story, Jack thinks about Floppy, women, and beer. Tiffany thinks about clothes, clothes, clothes; and Ryan thinks about Lightning Boy.

=== Season 5 (1998–99) ===
No. overall	No. in season	Title	Directed by	Written by	Original release date	Viewers (millions)
79	1	"X-Happily Ever After"	Linda Day	Kevin Curran	September 13, 1998	4.38
In a parody of The X-Files, Ryan and Tiffany investigate the Dancing Baby conspiracy.
80	2	"Feline Alright"	Andrew Susskind	Anne Parker	September 20, 1998	3.28
Tiffany must run errands for A. Cyril Studebaker, her literature teacher, to get an A.
81	3	"Basketball... Again?"	Andrew Susskind	Steve Lookner	September 27, 1998	3.77
After being fouled-out by a girl in a basketball game, Ryan decides to prove that men are better than women in basketball.
82	4	"A Movie Show"	Linda Day	Kimberly Young	October 4, 1998	4.53
Tiffany is annoyed when her sensitive boyfriend Jerome will not stand up to rude people at a movie.
83	5	"Love Letters"	Kevin Connolly	Nell Benjamin	October 11, 1998	4.30
Tiffany's love letters to her European boyfriend Jacques end up in Barbara's hands. Mr. Floppy holds a phone vote to decide if he should stay with Drew Barrymore.
84	6	"I Know What You Did in the Closet"	Scott Baio	Steve Lookner	October 25, 1998	4.06
After Tiffany remembers Ryan locking her in a closet 10 years before, Tiffany makes phone calls to him warning him to beware of the Closet Monster. Later, Ryan finds Jack, Barbara, and Ross dead and suspects Tiffany.
85	7	"Ross' IQ"	Wendy Neckels	John Ziaukas	November 1, 1998	3.20
After Ross scores an average 100 on his IQ test, he gets Ryan and Tiffany to sign as his parents so he can retake it.
86	8	"The Fencing Show"	Geoff Pierson	Nell Benjamin	November 8, 1998	3.81
Tiffany faces off against Barbara in a fencing competition to get a good job.
87	9	"Smart and Stupid"	Andrew Susskind	Anne Parker	November 15, 1998	3.58
To get money for the cable bill, the family goes on a game show called Smart and Stupid, but Tiffany tells Barbara she looked fat and stupid on TV.
88	10	"The Silver Rule"	Linda Day	John Ziaukas	November 22, 1998	3.58
School-newspaper editor Elliot sues Tiffany for sexual harassment when she tries to get him a front-page story; Ryan takes over the paper's horoscope section.
89	11	"Secrets"	Geoff Pierson	Gabrielle Topping	December 13, 1998	4.13
Ryan tells Tiffany he slept with Penny, whom she hates, and she cannot keep it secret.
90	12	"Royal Flush"	Kevin Connolly	Nell Benjamin	January 10, 1999	3.91
Jack sells expensive toilets illegally so Ryan and Tiffany can buy a Corvette.
91	13	"Taffy's Boy"	Linda Day	Nancy Cohen	January 17, 1999	3.47
Rich, overweight Taffy has a crush on Ryan, so he dates her for her money.
92	14	"Tiffany's Big Break"	Linda Day	Brian LaPan	January 24, 1999	2.91
Tiffany's bank wants her to be a spokeswoman to appeal to young savers.
93	15	"I Never Dunked for My Father"	Kevin Connolly	Eric Cohen	February 7, 1999	2.87
Jack does not want to compete in a father-son basketball tournament with Ross, so he has Ryan pretend to be Ross. Tiffany and Barbara have Ross help them bake a cake for the homeless food drive so he will be distracted when Jack goes to the tournament.
94	16	"Sex & Violins"	Linda Day	Kevin Curran	February 14, 1999	3.61
While Tiffany and Barbara write up their applications for college, Tiffany lies that she can play the violin, then discovers she will need to prove she can play.
95	17	"Tiffany Burger"	Linda Day	Kimberly Young	February 21, 1999	3.4
Jimbo, a fast-food millionaire with a burger joint, hires Ryan and tries to win Tiffany's heart by naming a new burger creation after her.
96	18	"The Perfect Guy"	Linda Day	Nell Benjamin	February 28, 1999	2.92
When Tiffany finds the guy who might be the one to lose her virginity to, Barbara gets in the way.
97	19	"Date to Win"	Andrew Susskind	Anne Parker	May 2, 1999	2.88
Tiffany decides to help Ryan try to win Barbara over.
98	20	"The Artist and the Con Artist"	Harriette Regan	John Clemeno & Suzanne Francis	May 9, 1999	2.97
Tiffany must paint a picture for art class but mixes up her works with Ryan's and becomes a success, then feels bad about using his work for her success.
99	21	"Tiffany Tutors the Teachers"	Linda Day	Paul Diamond	May 16, 1999	2.19
After discovering that none of the Northridge Junior College teachers passed a teaching exam, Tiffany worries that all her time there will not count for Harvard, so she decides to teach her teachers so they can pass the exam before it is too late.
100	22	"Le Morte D'Floppy"	Gerry Cohen	Matt Leavitt	May 23, 1999	3.38
In the final episode, Tiffany is finally accepted into Harvard--without financial aid, so Jack becomes a successful used-car salesman and soon moves up to selling new cars, then sells cars to celebrities. But Mr. Floppy "dies" because Jack is so caught up in his work, he will not pay attention to him. However, drinking beer brings him back.
