= David Susskind =

American producer and talk show host

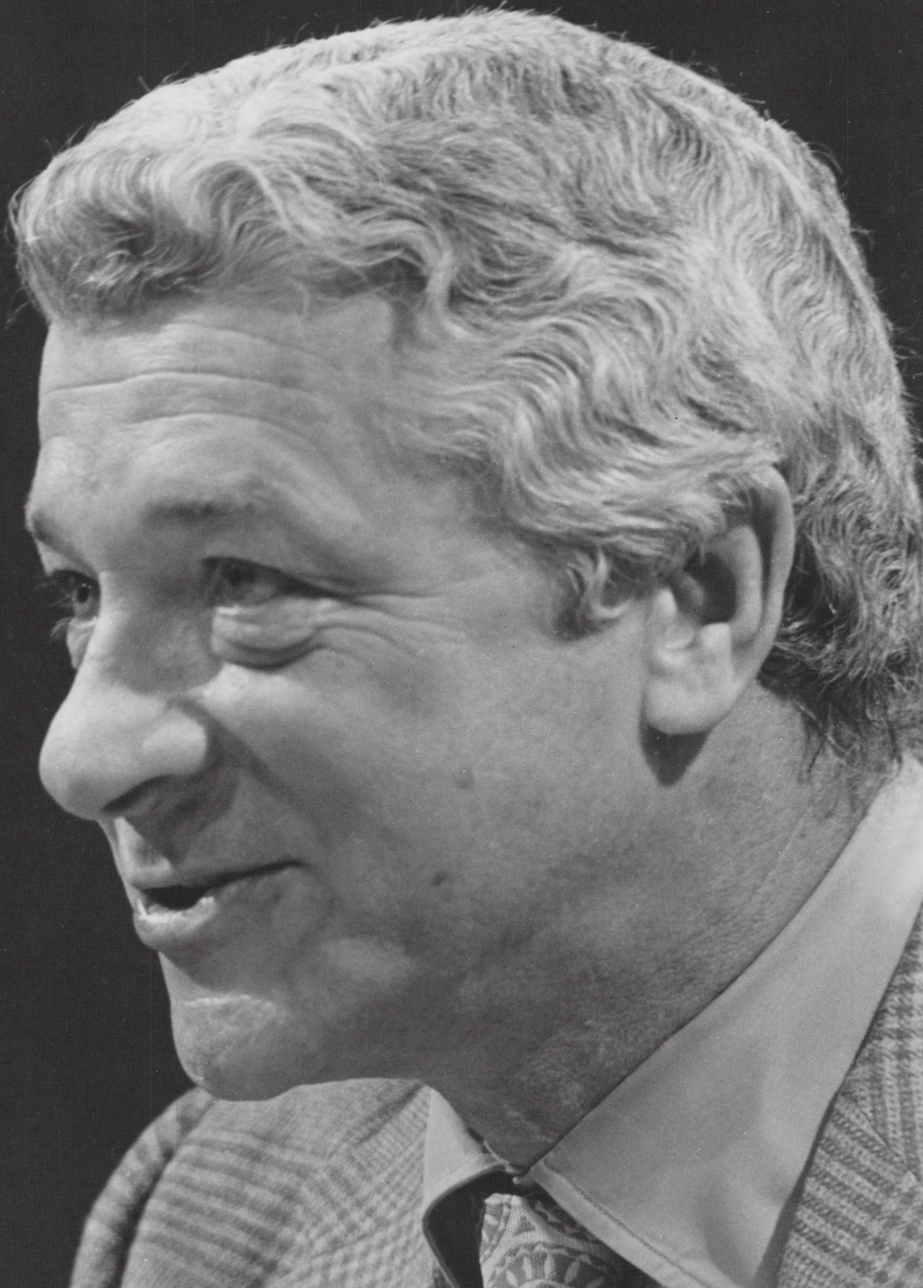
- A Susskind PBS promo in 1971
- Born: David Howard Susskind; December 19, 1920; New York City, U.S.
- Died: February 22, 1987 (aged 66); New York City, U.S.
- Education: Harvard University (B.A.)
- Known for: Television host; personality; producer
- Spouses: Phyllis Briskin (m. 1939–1966) Joyce Davidson (m. 1966–1986)
- Relatives: Norman Lear (first cousin)

David Howard Susskind (December 19, 1920 – February 22, 1987) was an American producer of TV, movies, and stage plays in addition to being a TV talk show host. His talk shows were innovative in the genre and addressed timely, controversial topics beyond the scope of others of the day.

== Background ==
Susskind was born to a Jewish family of modest means in Manhattan, New York and grew up in Brookline, Massachusetts. He graduated from Brookline High School in the city in 1938. He attended the University of Wisconsin–Madison in Madison and then Harvard University in Cambridge, Massachusetts, graduating with honors in 1942. He served in the U.S. Navy during World War II and, as a communications officer on an attack transport, USS Mellette, he was in action at Iwo Jima and Okinawa.

== Career ==
His first job after the war was as a press agent for Warner Brothers. Next, he was a talent agent for Century Artists, ultimately ending up in Music Corporation of America's newly minted television programming department, managing Dinah Shore, Jerry Lewis, and others. In New York City, Susskind formed Talent Associates, representing creators of material rather than performers. Eventually, he produced movies, stage plays, and television programs.

=== Talk shows ===
In 1954, Susskind became producer of the NBC legal drama Justice, based on case files of the Legal Aid Society in New York City. His program Open End began in 1958 on New York City's commercial independent station WNTA-TV, channel 13, the predecessor to WNET, and was so titled because the program continued until Susskind or his guests were too tired to continue. In 1961, Open End was constrained to two hours and went into national syndication. The show was retitled the David Susskind Show for its telecast on Sunday night, October 2, 1966. In the 1960s, it was the first nationally broadcast television talk show to feature people speaking out against American involvement in the Vietnam War. The show continued until its New York outlet canceled it in 1986, approximately six months before Susskind died.

During his close-to-three-decade run, Susskind covered many controversial topics of the day such as race relations, transsexualism, and the Vietnam War. It was the first nationally broadcast television talk show to feature people speaking out for gay rights. In 1971, Susskind interviewed six lesbians including Lilli Vincenz, Barbara Gittings, and Barbara Love, who were among the first open lesbians to appear on television in the United States. They debated long-held stereotypes about gays with Susskind. His interview of Soviet Premier Nikita Khrushchev, which aired in October 1960, during the height of the Cold War, generated national attention. It is one of very few talk show telecasts from the era which was preserved and can be viewed today.

In 1961, Susskind conducted a series of interviews with former President Harry Truman in Truman's hometown of Independence, Missouri. After picking Truman up at his home to take him to the Truman Presidential Library for the interviews over a number of days, Susskind asked Truman why he hadn't been invited into the home. According to presidential historian Michael Beschloss, Truman flatly told Susskind, "This is Bess' house" and that there had never been nor would there ever be a Jewish guest in it. Joyce Davidson, with whom Susskind was in a relationship, began working as a co-producer of a television talk show Susskind hosted locally in New York called Hot Line in June 1964. It was a different show from the Open End talk show. Hot Line was the first television show to use the recently invented 10-second broadcast delay. That gave the control room time to delete material deemed unfit for broadcast, especially from telephone call-ins. Davidson had a hand in the on-air version of the show and among other duties screened viewer phone calls. She also made the first approach to some of the people who appeared as guests on Hot Line, including Malcolm X, whom she invited for Hot Line immediately after he gave a speech at the Town Hall in Midtown Manhattan.

In a now notorious interview with then 25-year-old Muhammad Ali during a recently unearthed 1968 appearance on the British program The Eamonn Andrews Show, Susskind displayed an intense antipathy and vitriol towards the famous boxer, whom he excoriated with withering criticism for refusing to be conscripted into the U.S. military for the Vietnam War.

=== Producer ===
Susskind was also a noted producer with scores of movies, plays, and TV programs to his credit. His legacy is that of a producer of intelligent material at a time when TV had left its golden years behind and had firmly planted its feet in programming which had wide appeal, whether or not it was worth watching. Among other projects, he produced television adaptations of Beyond This Place (1957), The Bridge of San Luis Rey (1958), The Moon and Sixpence (1959), Ages of Man (1966), Death of a Salesman (also 1966), Look Homeward, Angel (1972), The Glass Menagerie (1973), and Caesar and Cleopatra (1976); the television films Truman at Potsdam (1976), Eleanor and Franklin (1976), and Eleanor and Franklin: The White House Years (1977); The World Beyond (1978); and the feature films A Raisin in the Sun (1961), Requiem for a Heavyweight (1962), and Loving Couples (1980). In 1964, he produced Craig Stevens' acclaimed CBS drama Mr. Broadway, which left the air after 13 episodes. He produced and owned all of the rights to the 1961 14-episode macabre CBS TV series – 'Way Out. His production company, Talent Associates, also produced Get Smart.

== Personal life ==
Susskind was married twice. Both of his marriages ended in divorce. In 1939, he married Phyllis Briskin; they had three children: Diana Susskind Laptook, Pamela Susskind Schaenen, and Andrew Susskind, a producer. They divorced in 1966. Also in 1966, he and Joyce Davidson married. Davidson had two daughters from a prior marriage, Connie and Shelley. They had a daughter, Samantha Maria Susskind Mannion. They separated in 1982 and divorced in 1986.

Susskind was first cousin to television writer and producer Norman Lear.

=== Death ===
In 1987 at the age of 66, Susskind suffered a fatal heart attack in New York City. He was interred at Westchester Hills Cemetery in Hastings-on-Hudson, New York.

== Legacy ==
Susskind was among those parodied in the Allan Sherman medley "Shticks and Stones," on Sherman's 1962 My Son, the Folk Singer album. In 1988, Susskind was inducted into the Television Hall of Fame.
