= Muscle (TV series) =

American sitcom (1995)

- Genre: Sitcom, Soap opera parody
- Created by: Rob LaZebnik
- Directed by: Gary Halvorson
- Starring: Wendy Benson; Michael Boatman; Nestor Carbonell; Dan Gauthier; Steve "Tower" Henneberry; Shannon Kenny; Jerry Levine; Amy Pietz; Alan Ruck; T.E. Russell; Michole White; Francis X. McCarthy; Brent Hinkley
- Theme music composer: Mark Mothersbaugh
- Country of origin: United States
- Original language: English
- No. of seasons: 1
- No. of episodes: 13

Production
- Executive producers: Paul Junger Witt; Rob LaZebnik; Tony Thomas; Gary S. Levine
- Camera setup: Multi-camera
- Running time: 30 minutes
- Production companies: Boone County Productions; Witt/Thomas Productions; Warner Bros. Television

Original release
- Network: The WB
- Release: January 11 – May 24, 1995

Muscle is an American sitcom television series that aired on The WB from January 11 to May 24, 1995. It was set inside the fictional Survival Gym in New York City, and was a parody of prime time soap operas of the 1990s (with Fox's Melrose Place being the most noticeable inspiration). The series was created by Rob LaZebnik, and was executive produced by Paul Junger Witt, Tony Thomas and Gary S. Levine (the former two of whom produced the groundbreaking 1977–81 sitcom Soap, which parodied daytime soap operas).

Because of the network's launch, Muscle was one of the four sitcoms that aired as part of The WB's original two-hour Wednesday night lineup, at 9:30/8:30c (with The Wayans Bros., The Parent 'Hood, and Unhappily Ever After being scheduled before it). It was the only one of the four that did not make it past the first season, and was also the first series to get canceled by the fledgling network. It ended with all the show's characters being shot and killed off, after being canceled due to low ratings, but replaced by ABC's Sister, Sister.

== Synopsis ==
The central plot concerned the murder of "Big" Jim Atkinson (portrayed by Adam West), the president and founder of the chain of gyms, by poisoning in the first episode. His son Kent, a former alcoholic and drug addict, was determined to figure out who the killer was and bring him or her to justice. His original suspect was his stepmother and the new president of the company, Jane Atkinson.

== Cast ==
=== Main ===
- Wendy Benson as Cleo, was a trainer and struggling actress working at the gym. Seen primarily as innocent and naive by her fellow gym staffers, she was in fact a woman with a mysterious past. This would be hinted at by the fact that she sometimes would speak with a Southern US accent when she was alone. She routinely received phone calls from a mysterious woman, also with a Southern US accent, who called her Lorna Louise.

It was later revealed that the mysterious woman was in fact her mother, who was a madam at a brothel. She did not know who her real father was, only that she was conceived around the time where the fun carnival was in town. Cleo/Lorna Louise believed that her father was a clown. She never met him during the show.

The staff and clientele at Survival Gym never knew this and Cleo was often used as a pawn in the power struggles between Jane and Kent Atkinson. For example, Jane asked her to be a surrogate mother for Big Jim's baby, in an attempt to control Survival Gym. When Kent found out, he seduced Cleo, and then asked her not to agree to be the surrogate. What he did not know, was Cleo had already had the procedure. When Cleo actually ended up being pregnant she did not know who her baby's father was, Kent, or Big Jim, but believed whoever it was she would end up inheriting a huge fortune from the Atkinson family. However, she had also had sex with a director to get in his play, so there was a possibility that he was the father of her baby. The series ended without the father being revealed.

- Michael Boatman as Garnet Hines, was a successful criminal defense Black attorney. He was portrayed as being amoral and doing whatever it takes to get his client acquitted. One of Garnet's past clients was Robert Bingham, who he failed to get acquitted, but did get him a light prison term.

Garnet Hines's most infamous client was Guy Davore, the Carnivore. Guy was accused of being a serial killer and a cannibal. Garnet with the help of Dr. Gold would get Guy acquitted, however both men would come to regret this action.

- Nestor Carbonell as Gianni was a gigolo, who used the gym to meet potential "dates". Gianni grew up poor and was determined never to be poor again. Believing that he had few talents, he decided the only way he could live a life of luxury was living off of women. The woman who he would become involved with was a wealthy widow named Dottie.

Gianni's other love interest was a trainer, named Angela, who had a crush on him. Although there was some chemistry between them, her lack of monetary success, initially led him to reject her. However, he would eventually dump the financially secure Dottie, for a romantic relationship with Angela. Ironically, shortly after choosing Angela, Gianni suffered a back injury that temporarily paralyzed him and caused him to be supported by Angela's limited finances.

- Dan Gauthier as Kent Atkinson, was the son of the founder of Survivor Gyms, Jim Atkinson. The two of them had a contentious relationship fueled by the fact that Kent never felt that his father thought he was good enough. This may have contributed to his various acts of rebellion against his father, such as his alcoholism, drug abuse and frequent womanizing.

In an ultimate act of rebellion he would sleep with his father's trophy wife, Jane, inside the gym's sauna. When Big Jim caught them in the act he apparently died of a heart attack, but an autopsy would reveal that he was in fact poisoned. Kent would then spend the rest of the series trying to bring his father's murderer to justice, by doing his own amateur investigation. His initial suspect was his step mother Jane, but he would also come to suspect his best friend, and gym manager, Victor.

- Steve "Tower" Henneberry (best known as Tower from the game show American Gladiators) as Sam Pippin, was a sweet, but not too bright and insecure bodybuilder, and trainer at the gym. Sam had a crush on Bronwyn, when he did not initially know she was a lesbian. His business partner Robert Bingham blackmailed Bronwyn, into going on a date with Sam in order to build up Sam's confidence. After Bronwyn came out, Sam attempted suicide by throwing himself off the Gym's roof, but Robert talked him down.
- Shannon Kenny as Jane Atkinson, was Big Jim Atkinson's beautiful, British, and much younger, wife (she was about the same age as his son). She was portrayed throughout the series as being very manipulative and was the series' principal villain. Her character can in part be seen as a parody of Joan Collins' character, Alexis, on the 1980s television series Dynasty.

After the death of her husband she tried to take over running the Survival Gym. However her stepson, Kent, remained a constant rival for the job. In order to win him over she set about seducing him and making him her second husband. Kent, however, believed she had murdered his father and was initially unwilling. After Big Jim's secretary confessed to the murder, it appeared that Jane and Kent would begin to have a relationship. Unbeknownst to Kent, Jane paid the secretary to confess.

Another scheme she had to secure the Survival Gym franchise was to become pregnant with Big Jim's child, using his previously frozen sperm. However, Jane discovered that she was in fact barren, and had to ask Cleo, to be a surrogate.

- Jerry Levine as Robert/Roberta Bingham, was a former stockbroker on Wall Street, who was convicted of insider trading. At the beginning of the show he was just released from prison and on parole. While on parole he had been given an ankle monitor, which limited how far he could move inside the gym.

Robert had initially hired Sam to be his trainer. Robert soon came up with a plan to have Sam to star in a series of exercise videos. Robert would do anything to help Sam, from extorting Bronwyn to date Sam, to providing him with steroids to help him win a bodybuilding contest. Despite doing these unscrupulous acts, he also showed genuine compassion towards Sam, like talking him out of committing suicide even though it violated Robert's parole (Sam tried to kill himself outside of Robert's ankle band's range). Given that he had a good reason, Robert's parole was not violated.

Because he tried to extort her, Bronwyn had a strong dislike for Robert. This was initially mutual due to the fact he found her to be arrogant. However in a strange twist, he developed a crush on her. Since she was a lesbian, he decided to dress in drag as Roberta to Angela and Gianni's wedding to win her over. Bronwyn apparently was attracted to "Roberta", however the series was not renewed and this plot element was not fully developed.

- Amy Pietz as Bronwyn Jones, was Kent's cousin, and a local television news anchor. At the start of the series she was a closeted lesbian, Robert Bingham would try and extort her in order to keep her secret. Bronwyn would respond by outing herself at the end of one of her own news casts. This would cause the news director to exploit this fact. For example, he designed a news promo about problems in health care as: "Naughty Nurses" featuring two beautiful women in nursing outfits having a pillow fight. Then the announcer would say the local news channel's name, "...featuring Bronwyn Jones, lesbian!" By the series end Bronwyn was considering leaving the broadcast to escape exploitation.
- Alan Ruck as Dr. Marshall Gold, a psychiatrist who worked out at the gym. Marshall was notorious for constantly revealing things told to him in the confidence of his practice. He was the one who told Robert that Bronwyn was a lesbian. Dr. Gold admitted that if he was bored listening to a patient, he would reread some of the details about Bronwyn's sex life.

Marshall was also the expert witness in the Guy Davore case. It was his testimony that Guy was sane that led, in part, to Guy's acquittal. Dr. Gold would later come to regret this.

- T.E. Russell as Victor, was the manager of the New York branch of Survival Gym and Kent's best friend. Victor was often poorly treated by Big Jim and thus became a suspect in his murder. Victor's friendship with Kent came into question when Kent told the police that Victor was probably the killer. After Big Jim's secretary confessed, Victor would refuse to be friends with Kent because he had suspected him of the murder.
- Michole White as Angela, was a trainer at the gym who had a crush on Gianni. Her parents ran a pet store specializing in birds and fish. While they did not have much money, they did love each other deeply. This is what Angela wanted, someone she could share a romantic relationship with.

Gianni, being a gigolo, initially resisted being with her because of her lack of money, however, he realized he did in fact love her. After a brief courtship he would propose marriage. The last episode of the series was Angela and Gianni's wedding at the gym, the place where they met.

=== Notable guest stars ===
- Adam West as "Big" Jim Atkinson, was the founder and president of the Survival Gym chain. Big Jim was seen occasionally in flashbacks and heard in voice-overs, after his death in the early episodes. Big Jim was portrayed as sort of a macho, self-promoting business man. He was constantly challenging people to feats of strength contests.

== Episodes ==
No.	Title	Directed by	Written by	Original release date	U.S. viewers (millions)
1	"Episode 1"	Will Mackenzie	Rob LaZebnik	January 11, 1995	2.4
2	"Episode 2"	Will Mackenzie	Rob LaZebnik	January 11, 1995	2.4
3	"Episode 3"	Gary Halvorson	Rob LaZebnik	January 18, 1995	2.4
4	"Episode 4"	Gary Halvorson	Jonathan Schmock	January 25, 1995	2.3
5	"Episode 5"	Gary Halvorson	Rob LaZebnik	February 1, 1995	2.4
6	"Episode 6"	Gary Halvorson	Rob LaZebnik	February 8, 1995	2.2
7	"Episode 7"	Gary Halvorson	Rob LaZebnik	February 15, 1995	2.3
8	"Episode 8"	Gary Halvorson	Rob LaZebnik	February 22, 1995	2.5
9	"Episode 9"	Gary Halvorson	Rob LaZebnik	March 1, 1995	1.9
10	"Episode 10"	Gary Halvorson	Rob LaZebnik	April 26, 1995	1.7
11	"Episode 11"	Gary Halvorson	Rob LaZebnik	May 10, 1995	1.5
12	"Episode 12"	Gary Halvorson	Rob LaZebnik	May 17, 1995	2.0
13	"Episode 13"	Gary Halvorson	Rob LaZebnik	May 24, 1995	2.1
