= Attention Shoppers (film) =

2000 film by Philip Charles MacKenzie

- Official film poster
- Directed by: Philip Charles MacKenzie
- Written by: Nestor Carbonell
- Produced by: Lysa Hayland
- Starring: Nestor Carbonell; Michael Lerner; Kathy Najimy; Martin Mull; Luke Perry; Cara Buono
- Cinematography: Geary McLeod
- Edited by: Tara Timpone
- Music by: Richard Ziegler
- Distributed by: MGM Home Entertainment
- Release date: November 28, 2000
- Running time: 87 minutes
- Country: United States
- Language: English

Attention Shoppers is a 2000 American comedy film directed by Philip Charles MacKenzie and written by Nestor Carbonell. The film stars Carbonell in the lead role, with Michael Lerner, Kathy Najimy, Martin Mull, Luke Perry, Cara Buono, Casey Affleck, and Lin Shaye in supporting roles.

== Synopsis ==
An actor from a popular television sitcom agrees to appear at the grand opening of a Houston, Texas supermarket. On his journey to and during his appearance at the supermarket, he learns lessons about his career, celebrity, human nature, and his marital problems from the interesting and strange people he meets.

== Cast ==
- Nestor Carbonell as Enrique Suarez
- Michael Lerner as Khourosh
- Kathy Najimy as Penelope
- Martin Mull as Charles
- Luke Perry as Mark Pinnalore
- Cara Buono as Claire Suarez
- Carlos Jacott as Duncan Baird
- Casey Affleck as Jed
- Lillian Adams as Gracie
- Lin Shaye as Libby
- Shannon Kenny as Shelly
- O-Lan Jones as Meg
- Al Israel as Carlos
- Mary-Pat Green as Sandwich Woman

== Release ==
The film was given a DVD release in the United States and Canada on November 28, 2000, by MGM Home Entertainment.

== Reception ==
Attention Shoppers received mixed reviews from critics. Nathan Rabin from The A.V. Club wrote: "As a writer, Carbonell displays a real talent for low-key observational humor, and Attention Shoppers benefits from an excellent supporting cast that includes Carlos Jacott, Kathy Najimy, Michael Lerner, and a scene-stealing Lin Shaye. But by the time Carbonell arrives at Kmart halfway in, the film's already less-than-breathless pace grinds to a halt, crippling it with a dire lack of forward momentum. Attention Shoppers isn't quite funny or compelling enough to qualify as a success, but its cast, dry comic tone, and admirable attention to detail make it one of the most interesting failures to be released directly to video this year."
