= Néstor Carbonell =

American actor (born 1967)

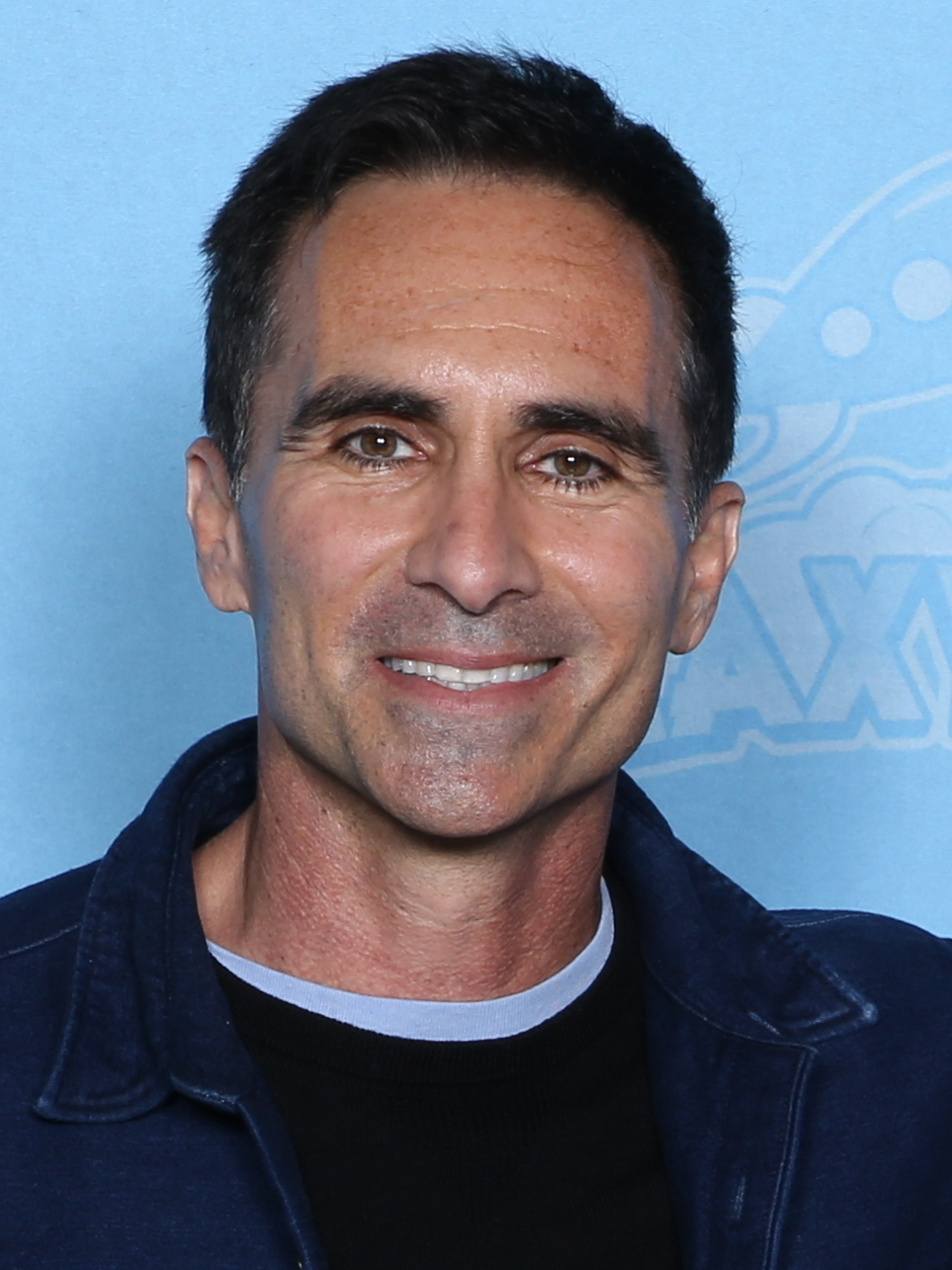
- Carbonell at GalaxyCon Columbus in 2022
- Born: Néstor Gastón Carbonell; December 1, 1967 (age 58); New York City, U.S.
- Education: Harvard University (AB)
- Occupations: Actor; director; screenwriter
- Years active: 1989–present
- Spouse: Shannon Kenny (m. 2001)
- Children: 2

Néstor Gastón Carbonell (Spanish pronunciation: [ˈnestoɾ ɣasˈtoŋ kaɾβoˈneʎ]; born December 1, 1967) is an American actor, director, and screenwriter. He came to prominence for his role as Luis Rivera in the NBC sitcom Suddenly Susan. He is known for his roles as Richard Alpert in the ABC drama series Lost, Sheriff Alex Romero in the A&E drama series Bates Motel, and Yanko Flores in the Apple TV+ drama series The Morning Show. Carbonell also starred as Mayor Anthony Garcia in Christopher Nolan's superhero films The Dark Knight (2008) and The Dark Knight Rises (2012). He won the 2024 Primetime Emmy Award for Outstanding Guest Actor in a Drama Series for his role in the FX series Shōgun.

== Early life ==
Carbonell was born in New York City to Cuban parents Néstor Tulio Carbonell Cortina and Rosa Ramírez de Arellano Cárdenas. His parents are of Spanish descent (his grandparents were of Catalan, Basque, Navarran, and Andalusian origins). Carbonell was raised a Roman Catholic.

Nestor's father worked for PepsiCo, which required the family to live for periods of time in London, Mexico City, the Bahamas, and Caracas. His father is also active in the Cuban community, authoring the book And The Russians Stayed: The Sovietization of Cuba. Carbonell has an older sister, Rosa Maria "Mia" Carbonell, a Senior Vice President of Corporate Communications at Forbes. Former professional baseball player Rafael Palmeiro is his cousin. His paternal great-grandfather, José Manuel Cortina, was a noted Cuban orator and diplomat.

Carbonell was educated at The British School while living in Caracas. His family later moved back to the U.S., and he attended Deerfield Academy in Massachusetts with future Lost co-star Matthew Fox.

In 1990, he graduated with a Bachelor of Arts in English from Harvard University (also the alma mater of his father and sister).

== Career ==
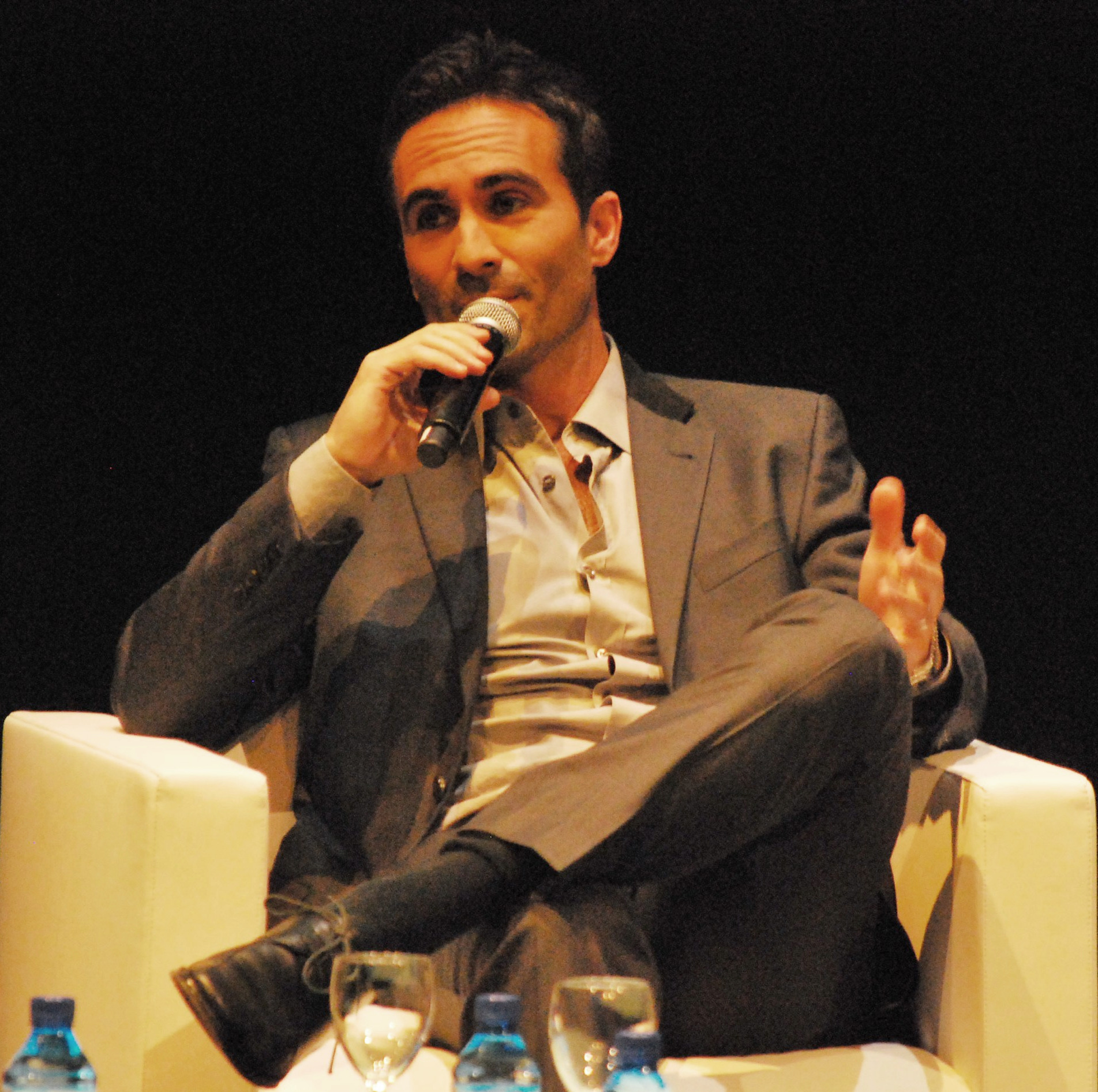
Carbonell promoting Lost in 2010

Carbonell's first acting role was a guest starring part as Alberto Cordova in an episode of As the World Turns. He then appeared in episodes of Law & Order, Melrose Place, A Different World, Reasonable Doubts, Good Advice, Brotherly Love, and The John Larroquette Show. In 1995, he starred in a dual role, Roberto and one half of the Couple in Bar, in Stephen Sondheim and George Furth's play Getting Away with Murder. That same year, he appeared as a main cast member on the short-lived The WB sitcom Muscle. He subsequently portrayed the regular role of Luis Rivera on the Brooke Shields-led sitcom Suddenly Susan for four seasons (1996–2000).

For much of his early career, he played characters with thick Hispanic accents, and was so convincing that people often assumed that was his normal speaking voice. One of Carbonell's first obstacles in Hollywood was branching out from ethnic roles. In 2000, Carbonell made his debut as a screenwriter with the comedy film Attention Shoppers, in which he also starred as Enrique Suarez, the lead role. He has since had recurring roles on Resurrection Blvd., The Tick, Kim Possible (as the voice of Señor Senior Jr.), Century City, Strong Medicine, and Cold Case. He also guest starred on Scrubs (in the episode "My Moment of Un-Truth"), House (in the episode "Cursed"), Monk (in the episode "Mr. Monk Gets Married"), and Day Break (in the episode "What If He Can Change the Day?"). In 2006, he appeared alongside his future Lost co-star Matthew Fox, as assassin Pasquale Acosta, in the film Smokin' Aces.

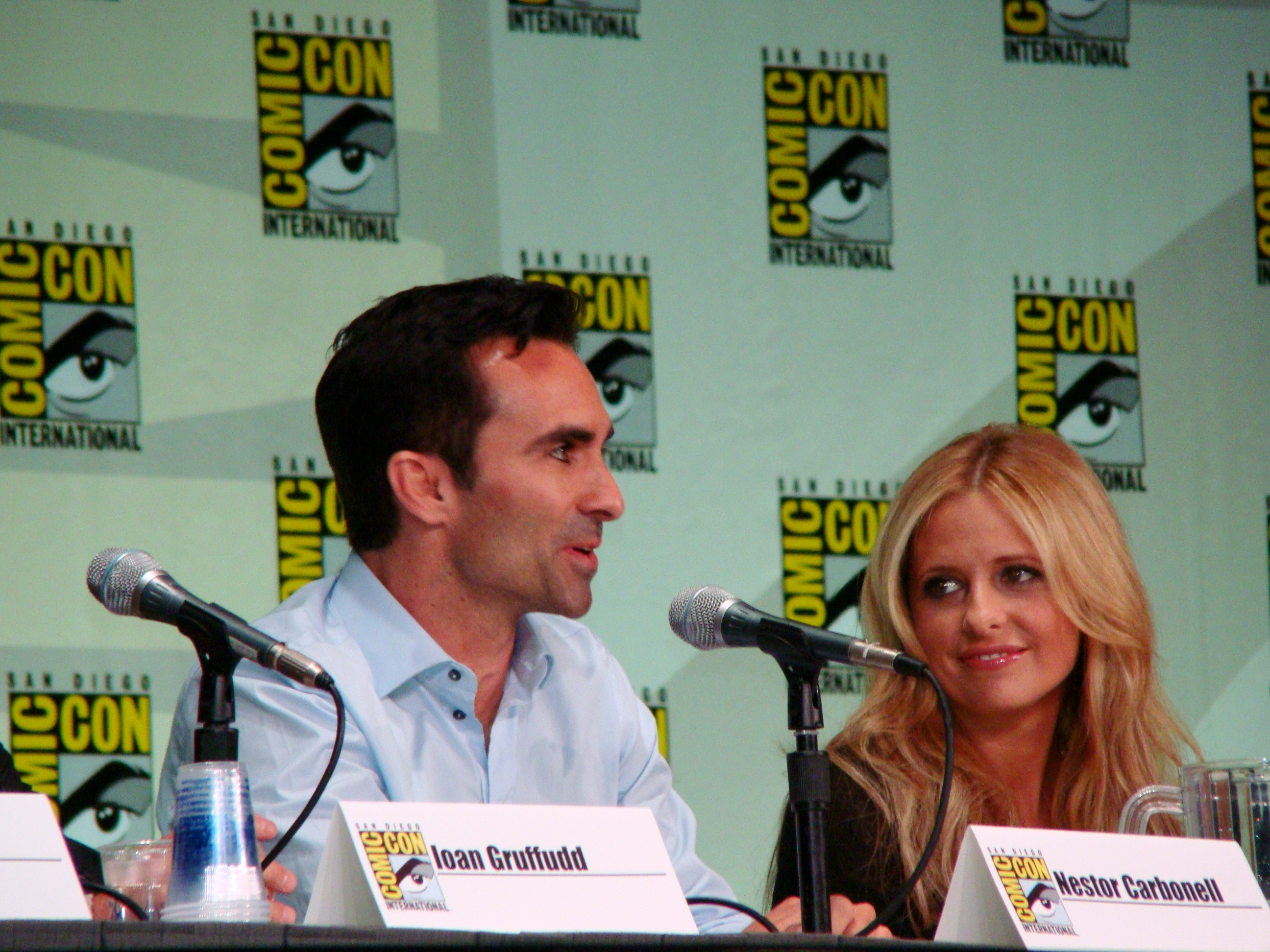
Carbonell and Sarah Michelle Gellar at the 2011 San Diego Comic-Con

Carbonell was cast as Richard Alpert on the third season of ABC's drama series Lost. The mysteries surrounding his ageless character were heavily discussed among the fan community throughout his arc in the season. While producing the final episodes of the third season, Carbonell was cast in a starring role as Frank Duque on the CBS series Cane. The writers of Lost modified their original story plan for the third season in anticipation for Carbonell's potential unavailability. Despite Carbonell's willingness to return to the ABC series, CBS president Nina Tassler ruled out another guest appearance. Cane was cancelled during the 2007–2008 Writers Guild of America strike, freeing Carbonell from his contract with CBS. In 2008, Lost showrunner Carlton Cuse stated that Carbonell would reprise his role as Richard Alpert towards the end of the series' fourth season, as a result of Cane's cancellation. Carbonell made appearances in the episodes "Cabin Fever" and "There's No Place Like Home". Cuse cited this as an unintended positive consequence of the strike. Carbonell appeared in nine episodes of the fifth season, and was upgraded to a main cast member of Lost for its sixth and final season.

In 2008, he landed the role of Mayor Anthony Garcia in Christopher Nolan's The Dark Knight. His wife, Shannon Kenny, was previously involved in a Batman project, voicing the character Inque in the Batman Beyond television series. In 2010, Carbonell joined the series Psych for two episodes playing Declan Rand, a criminal profiler. In 2011, Carbonell starred in the CW series Ringer as FBI agent Victor Machado. Also in 2011, he was announced to guest star in FX comedy series Wilfred, a role which later turned into a recurring one. The following year, Carbonell briefly appeared in The Dark Knight Rises, reprising his role as Mayor Anthony Garcia in the final installment of Christopher Nolan's Dark Knight trilogy.

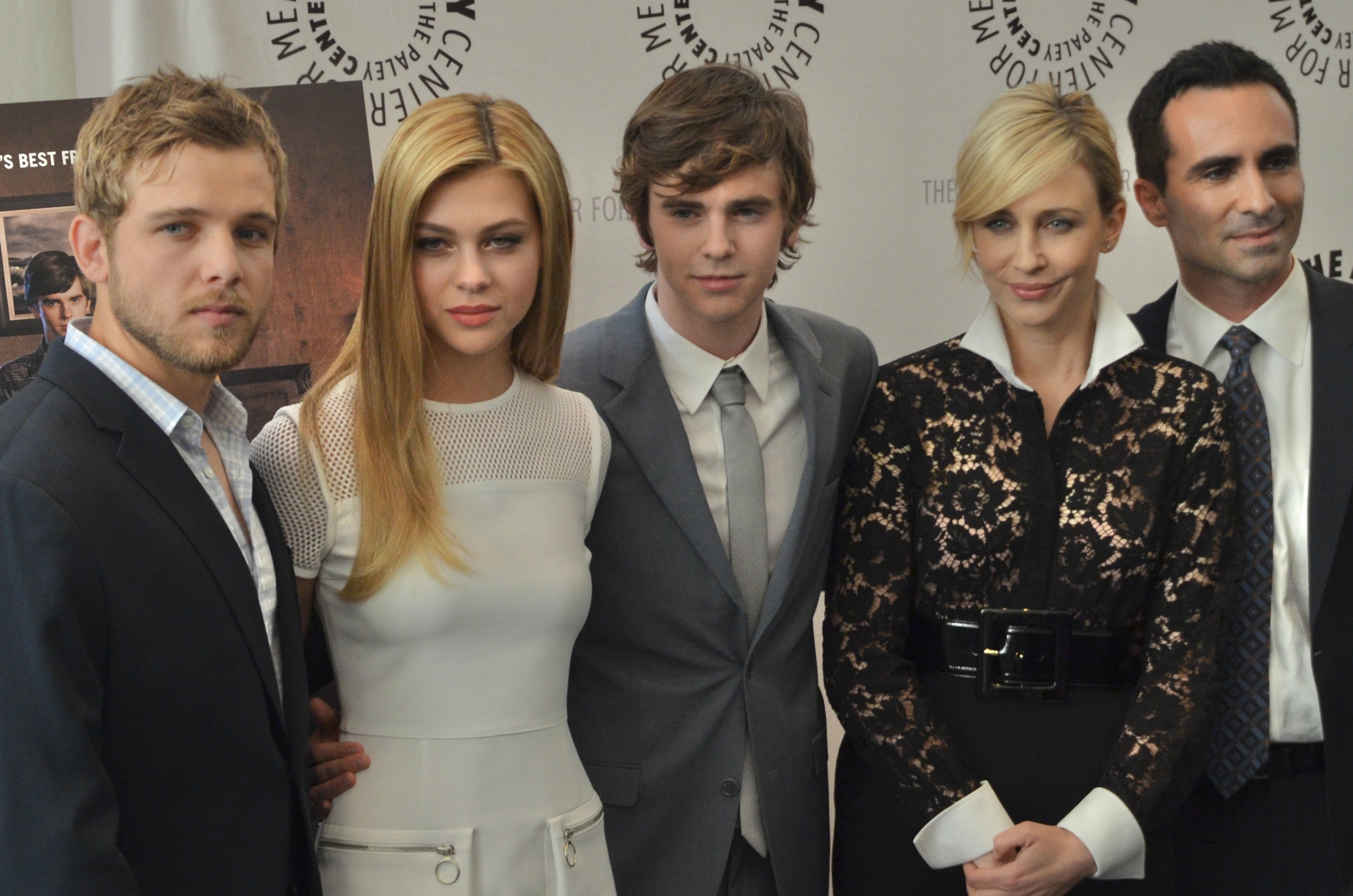
Carbonell with the cast of Bates Motel in 2013

From 2013 to the series' ending in 2017, he portrayed Sheriff Alex Romero in the A&E Psycho prequel series Bates Motel, opposite Vera Farmiga and Freddie Highmore. In the first season, he starred in a recurring capacity, but was upgraded to a main cast member starting with the second season. Carbonell also directed three episodes of the series. In 2014, he guest starred on the CBS drama series Person of Interest in the episode "Most Likely to...", and on the CBS political drama series The Good Wife in the episode "The Deep Web". That same year, he began recurring as Raymond Navaro in NBC's espionage thriller series State of Affairs. In 2017, Carbonell directed the episode "Apple" of the ABC drama series The Good Doctor, starring his Bates Motel co-star Highmore.

In 2024, he appeared as Rodrigues in the FX series Shōgun, winning the Primetime Emmy Award for Outstanding Guest Actor in a Drama Series for the role.

== Personal life ==
Carbonell has been married to Australian actress Shannon Kenny since January 3, 2001. They met while working together on the 1995 television series Muscle and went on to co-star in the 2000 film Attention Shoppers, which Carbonell wrote. The couple have two sons, Rafael (born 2002) and Marco (born 2005). He is a practicing Roman Catholic.

Carbonell's dark eyelashes have been a staple topic of discussion in interviews, and both Carbonell and the producers of Lost made it clear they are not enhanced by any form of makeup. A short skit during the Lost panel at the 2009 San Diego Comic-Con featured Carbonell allegedly applying eyeliner before throwing a rant upon receiving the wrong color makeup from an assistant. In a season 5 episode of Lost, James "Sawyer" Ford refers to Carbonell's character as "your buddy out there with the eyeliner." In addition, in the Psych episode "Shawn 2.0", Shawn Spencer comments about him having "impossibly dark eyelashes."

He is fluent in Spanish, a skill he put to use in the sixth-season episode of Lost, "Ab Aeterno", in which numerous scenes contain dialogue mostly or solely in Spanish. He also starred in a Spanish-language Heineken commercial.

== Filmography ==
=== Film ===
Year	Title	Role	Notes
2000	Attention Shoppers	Enrique Suarez	
2001	Jack the Dog	Jack the Dog	
2003	Manhood	Jack the Dog	
2005	The Lost City	Luis Fellove	
2006	Smokin' Aces	Pasquale Acosta	
2008	The Dark Knight	Mayor Anthony Garcia	
2008	Killer Movie	Seaton Brookstone	
2010	Noah's Ark: The New Beginning	Leeu (voice)	
2012	For Greater Glory	Mayor Picazo	
2012	The Dark Knight Rises	Mayor Anthony Garcia	
2013	Dead Drop	Santiago	
2016	Director's Cut	CSI Perry	
2016	Imperium	Tom Hernandez	
2017	Crown Heights	Bruce Regenstreich	
2022	Bandit	Detective John Snydes	
2022	Medicine Men	Silas St. John	
2023	Clawfoot	Evan	
2024	The Image of You	David	
2024	Getting Lost	Himself	
2025	Motherland	Mateo	
2026	The Rip	Major Thom Vallejo	
2026	Ready or Not 2: Here I Come	Ignacio El Caido	

=== Television ===
Year	Title	Role	Notes
1989	As the World Turns	Alberto Córdova	Episode: "1.8965"
1991	Law & Order	Stuart Carradine	Episode: "Out of Control"
1992	Melrose Place	Alex	Episode: "Lost & Found"
1992	A Different World	Malik Velásquez	2 episodes
1993	Reasonable Doubts	Tomasso López	Episode: "The Ties That Bind (Part 1)"
1994	Good Advice	Marco	Episode: "Two Times Twenty"
1995	Muscle	Gianni	13 episodes
1996	Brotherly Love	Eduardo	Episode: "Remember"
1996	The John Larroquette Show	Felicio	Episode: "Intern Writer"
1996–2000	Suddenly Susan	Luis Rivera	93 episodes
1998	Veronica's Closet	Tony Tony	Episode: "Veronica's All Nighter"
1998	Encore! Encore!	Marly Morrow	Episode: "Mr. Joe's Wild Rose"
2000	Resurrection Blvd.	Peter Terrano	6 episodes
2000	Noriega: God's Favorite	Major Giroldi	Television film
2000	Happily Ever After	Sir Gooey (voice)	Episode: "Robinita Hood"
2001	These Old Broads	Gavin	Television film
2001–2002	The Tick	Batmanuel	9 episodes
2002	The Laramie Project	Moisés Kaufman	Television film
2002	Static Shock	García (voice)	Episode: "Pop's Girlfriend"
2002	Ally McBeal	Miles Josephson	Episode: "What I'll Never Do for Love Again"
2002–2007	Kim Possible	Señor Senior Jr. (voice)	12 episodes
2003	Queens Supreme	Benedetto	Episode: "Supreme Heat"
2003	The Division	Byron Johnson	Episode: "Cold Comfort"
2004	Monk	Dalton Padron	Episode: "Mr. Monk Gets Married"
2004	Scrubs	Dr. Ronny Ramírez	Episode: "My Moment of un-Truth"
2004	Century City	Tom Montero	9 episodes
2004–2006	Strong Medicine	Jonas Rey	14 episodes
2005	Dave the Barbarian	Zit (voice)	Episode: "The Way of the Dave/Beauty and the Zit"
2005	Justice League Unlimited	El Diablo (voice)	Episode: "The Once and Future Thing, Part One: Weird Western Tales"
2005	House	Jeffrey Reilich	Episode: "Cursed"
2006	Brandy & Mr. Whiskers	Tito (voice)	Episode: "Rain Delay"
2006	Commander in Chief	Dr. Kyle Brock	Episode: "The Elephant in the Room"
2006	Cold Case	Mike Valens	3 episodes
2006	Day Break	Eddie Reyes	Episode: "What If He Can Change the Day?"
2007	Eloise: The Animated Series	Diego (voice)	Episode: "Eloise Goes to Hollywood"
2007	American Dragon: Jake Long	Cupid (voice)	Episode: "The Love Cruise"
2007	Andy Barker, P.I.	Dr. Jeremy Cey	Episode: "The Big No Sleep"
2007	Cane	Frank Duque	13 episodes
2007–2010	Lost	Richard Alpert	29 episodes
2010–2012	The Penguins of Madagascar	Savio (voice)	4 episodes
2010	Psych	Declan Rand	2 episodes
2011–2012	Ringer	Victor Machado	17 episodes
2011–2014	Wilfred	Dr. Arturo Ramos	3 episodes
2013–2017	Bates Motel	Sheriff Alex Romero	45 episodes
2014	Person of Interest	Matthew Reed	Episode: "Most Likely to..."
2014	The Good Wife	Daniel Irwin	Episode: "The Deep Web"
2014–2015	State of Affairs	Raymond Navaro	7 episodes
2014–2015	Jake and the Never Land Pirates	Eagle-Eye (voice)	2 episodes
2015	Ray Donovan	Sheldon Blackwood	Episode: "Handshake Deal"
2017–2020	Elena of Avalor	King Raul (voice)	4 episodes
2018	Midnight, Texas	Kai Lucero	7 episodes
2019–present	The Morning Show	Yanko Flores	25 episodes
2019–2020	Big Hero 6: The Series	Chief Cruz (voice)	9 episodes
2020	DuckTales	Ponce de Leon, Springbreakers (voice)	Episode: "The Forbidden Fountain of the Foreverglades!"
2024	Shōgun	Vasco Rodrigues	3 episodes
2025	Pulse	Dr. Ruben Soriano	8 episodes

== Stage ==
Year	Title	Role	Location
1990	A Silent Thunder	Cpl. Joe Santana	Apple Corps Theatre, New York
1995	Getting Away with Murder	Roberto / Couple in Bar	Old Globe Theatre, San Diego

== Other credits ==
Year	Title	Functioned as			Notes
Year	Title	Director	Writer	Producer	Notes
2000	Attention Shoppers		Yes	Executive	
2015–2017	Bates Motel	Yes			3 episodes
2017–2020	The Good Doctor	Yes			2 episodes
2018	Rise	Yes			Episode: "The Petition"
2021–2022	New Amsterdam	Yes			Episodes: "Seed Money", "All Night Long", "Big Day"
2023–2024	Law & Order	Yes			Episodes: "Private Lives", "Report Card"

== Awards and nominations ==
Year	Award	Category	Nominated work	Result
1996	ALMA Awards	Outstanding Individual Performance in a Comedy Series	Suddenly Susan	Nominated
1998	ALMA Awards	Outstanding Actor in a Comedy Series	Suddenly Susan	Won
1999	ALMA Awards	Outstanding Actor in a Comedy Series	Suddenly Susan	Won
2003	Ft. Lauderdale International Film Festival	Star on the Horizon	Himself	Won
2009	ALMA Awards	Best Actor on Television – Drama	Lost	Nominated
2010	Golden Nymph Awards	Outstanding Actor – Drama Series	Lost	Nominated
2010	Gold Derby Awards	TV Ensemble of the Year	Lost	Nominated
2010	Imagen Awards	Best Actor – Television	Lost	Nominated
2013	Imagen Awards	Best Supporting Actor – Television	Bates Motel	Nominated
2014	Imagen Awards	Best Supporting Actor – Television	Bates Motel	Nominated
2022	Screen Actors Guild Awards	Outstanding Performance by an Ensemble in a Drama Series	The Morning Show	Nominated
2024	Screen Actors Guild Awards	Outstanding Performance by an Ensemble in a Drama Series	The Morning Show	Nominated
2024	Primetime Emmy Awards	Outstanding Guest Actor in a Drama Series	Shōgun (for "Anjin")	Won
