= Bodily Harm (film) =

- Directed by: James Lemmo
- Screenplay by: Joseph Whaley; Ronda Barendse; James Lemmo
- Produced by: Keith Samples; Bruce Cohn Curtis
- Starring: Linda Fiorentino; Daniel Baldwin
- Cinematography: Doyle Smith
- Edited by: Carl Kress
- Music by: Robert Sprayberry
- Production company: Warner Bros.
- Distributed by: WEA Corp.
- Release date: 1995
- Running time: 91 minutes
- Country: United States
- Language: English

Bodily Harm is a 1995 thriller film directed by James Lemmo and starring Linda Fiorentino and Daniel Baldwin. It was edited by Carl Kress, and has music by Robert Sprayberry and cinematography by Doyle Smith. It set in Las Vegas, Nevada. The film was rated R and was distributed by Warner Vision Entertainment and internationally by Rysher Entertainment.

== Premise ==
When a striptease dancer is brutally murdered in Las Vegas, detective Rita Cates and her partner, J.D. Prejon, are assigned to the case. There is not much evidence available, but what they have points to Sam McKeon, an ex-cop. This puts Rita in a difficult position, because she and Sam previously had a scalding affair, which ultimately led to her husband's suicide. They have not spoken since then, but Rita could never get Sam out of her mind. During the investigation, they resume their affair, although Rita is constantly torn between trust and distrust, and attempting to keep an open mind. Eventually she has to choose, knowing that the wrong choice may get her killed.

== Cast ==
- Linda Fiorentino as Rita Cates
- Daniel Baldwin as Sam McKeon
- Gregg Henry as J.D. Prejon
- Bill Smitrovich as Lieutenant Darryl Stewart
- Troy Evans as Oscar Simpson
- Joe Regalbuto as Stan Geffen
- Millie Perkins as Dr. Spencer
- Shannon Kenny as Jacy Barclay / Krystal Lynn
- Todd Susman as Jerry Roth
- William Utay as Frangipani
- Ken Lerner as Alex Shaw
- Casey Biggs as Michael Cates

== Release ==
Bodily Harm was released in theatres in 1995. The film was released on VHS on November 21, 1995, by Warner Home Video.
