= Andrew Susskind =

American film producer

- Education: Harvard College (BA)
- Occupations: Film and television producer, television director
- Years active: 1980–present
- Parent(s): Phyllis Briskin Susskind; David Susskind

Andrew Susskind is an American film and television producer and television director.

== Biography ==
Susskind was born to a Jewish family, the son of Phyllis (née Briskin) and David Susskind. He has three sisters: Diana Susskind Laptook, Pamela Susskind Schaenen, and Samantha Susskind Mannion. His father was a film producer. He worked at The Susskind Company for four years with David Susskind, from 1980 to 1984, then subsequently at Embassy Television for three years, before joining Weintraub Entertainment Group Television on May 1, 1987.

He has worked a producer on the a number of television specials. During the mid to late 1980s, he served as a production consultant for the sitcoms 227, It's Your Move, Married... with Children, The Charmings, "Trial and Error", and "Sweet Surrender" before becoming executive producer for the sitcom Thea in 1993. Producer of "Dear Liar", "Casey Stengel", "Ian McKellen: Acting Shakespeare", "Rita Hayworth: The Love Goddess" In 1997, he began his career as a television director, directing episodes of Unhappily Ever After, Two Guys and a Girl, The Hughleys. and "The King of Queens"

Susskind also teaches at Drexel University. He previously taught a class on TV sitcoms at Hunter College in New York City.
