= Weintraub Entertainment Group =

Film production company (1986–1990)

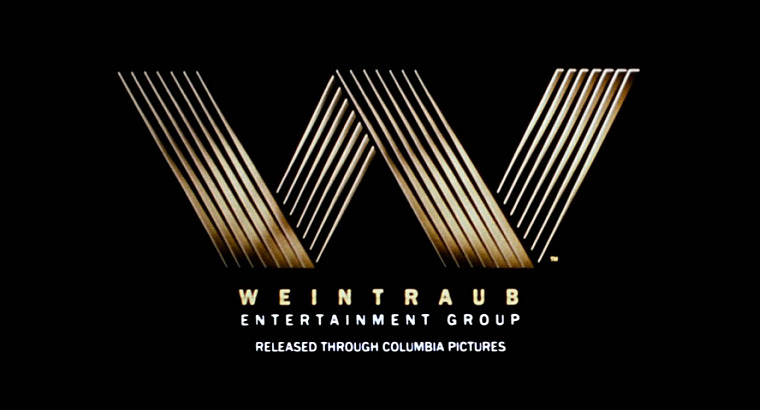
- Weintraub Entertainment Group logo (1988 - 1990)
- Company type: Private corporation
- Industry: Motion picture
- Founded: July 1, 1986; 39 years ago
- Founder: Jerry Weintraub
- Defunct: September 30, 1990; 35 years ago
- Fate: Bankruptcy
- Successors: Company: Columbia Pictures; Library: Sony Pictures; Paramount Pictures (through Melange Pictures) (television and online streaming rights excluding The Big Blue); StudioCanal (through Lumiere Pictures and Television) (Thorn EMI Screen Entertainment library only)
- Key people: Jerry Weintraub, Chair/CEO; Kenneth Kleinberg, president/COO; Andrew Susskind, TV president
- Products: films
- Services: distribution
- Owner: The Coca-Cola Company; US Tobacco Company; Columbia Pictures (15%; 1987–1989); Warner Bros. (15%; 1989–1990)

Weintraub Entertainment Group (WEG) was a film production company considered to be a mini-major studio founded by Jerry Weintraub.

== History ==
Weintraub Entertainment Group was formed on July 1, 1986 by Jerry Weintraub. In February 1987, WEG received $461 million in financing from Columbia Pictures, Cineplex Odeon and others in the form of securities, bank loans and advances. The Coca-Cola Company and US Tobacco Company were principal investors. WEG also arranged a $145-million, 7-year credit line with the Bank of America. WEG also signed a 20-year distribution deal with Columbia and planned to release seven or eight movies per year.

In March 1987, WEG signed its first production and distribution deal, a three-year agreement with Robert Stigwood's RSO Films for multiple films budgeted in the $12-million to $15-million range. With Stigwood's partnership, WEG was to finance a film version of Evita with Oliver Stone as writer/director and Meryl Streep as Eva Perón. However, the studio dropped the project.

WEG purchased from The Cannon Group in May 1987 its 2,000-title British film library, the Thorn EMI Screen Entertainment library, for $85 million with $50 million from a loan. On July 20, Harry Usher joined the Group as President of the Weintraub International Enterprises division and as a senior vice president.

In January 1988, Barney Rosenzweig was hired as chairman of the television unit, corporate vice president and a member of the executive committee. In July, the Bank of America terminated its credit line with Weintraub after difficulties in syndicating parts of the loan to other banks due to the Thorn-EMI loan. The Group's first release was The Big Blue in August; it grossed $1.6 million the opening weekend.

In January 1989, Usher left his position as President of the Weintraub International Enterprises. The Bank of America and WEG established a new credit line for two years and $95 million with Credit Lyonnais participating.

In 1989, as a result of Sony/Columbia hiring Peter Guber and Jon Peters away from Warner Bros., Sony/Columbia traded its 15% share in WEG.

In September 1990, WEG filed for Chapter 11 bankruptcy. Later that month, Jerry Weintraub left the company and forged a deal with Warner Bros., while Columbia still remained indebted to releasing WEG films.

Film Asset Holding Co., a company formed by WEG's two primary bank creditors, sued Weintraub over his structuring of a sale of the Peter Pan story to Sony Pictures Entertainment in the fall of 1990. Weintraub and Film Assets settled in January 1992.

In August 1998, a jury verdict for $7 million was lost by Bear Stearns Cos. to investors who had been misled by the brokerage's $83 million bond issue prospectus for the now-bankrupt Weintraub Entertainment Group.

== Production/release library ==
- The Big Blue (1988): distribution rights, $3 million
- Fresh Horses (1988): first original production, grossed only $7 million
- My Stepmother Is an Alien (1988): $26 million budget, grossed $13.8 million
- The Karen Carpenter Story (1989): a TV movie release on CBS
- Listen to Me (1989)
- She's Out of Control (1989)
- Troop Beverly Hills (1989)
- The Gods Must Be Crazy II (1989)

After the company shut down its assets were reorganized into the WEG Acquisition Corp, and are currently held by Sony, while the television rights are controlled by Paramount Pictures and under license to Trifecta Entertainment.
