= Wendy Benson =

American actress

- Born: July 8, 1971 (age 55); New York City, U.S.
- Occupation: Actress
- Years active: 1992–present
- Spouse: Michael Landes (m. 2000)
- Children: 2

Wendy Benson-Landes (born July 8, 1971) is an American actress, known for her roles on television. She played the role of Julie Harris in the 2001 biographical television movie James Dean. Benson also starred in the sitcoms Muscle (1995) and Secret Service Guy (1996) and was a regular cast member on Unhappily Ever After from 1997 to 1999.

Benson starred in the 1997 slasher film Wishmaster. She had a recurring roles on I'll Fly Away and Desperate Housewives. She guest starred in many television series, including Murder, She Wrote, The X-Files, Charmed, JAG, Ugly Betty, According to Jim, Ghost Whisperer, CSI: Miami, Mad Men and Grey's Anatomy. In 2019, she had a recurring role on the CBS daytime soap opera, The Young and the Restless.

Benson was born in New York City, the daughter of Scottish photographer Harry Benson. She studied acting at the Royal Academy of Dramatic Art in London and in the National Theater Institute at the Eugene O'Neill Center in Waterford, Connecticut. She married actor Michael Landes in October 2000. They have two children together.

== Selected filmography ==
- Television
- As the World Turns as Meredith Delaney (1992)
- I'll Fly Away as Taylor (6 episodes, 1992–1993)
- Beverly Hills, 90210 as Darla Hansen (2 episodes, 1993)
- Muscle as Lorna Louise (13 episodes, 1995)
- Secret Service Guy as Misty (7 episodes, 1996)
- The X-Files as Margi Kleinjan (episode: "Syzygy", 1996)
- Unhappily Ever After as Barbara Caufield (24 episodes, 1997–1999)
- Ugly Betty as Veronica (2 episodes, 2007–2008)
- Desperate Housewives as Colleen Henderson (4 episodes, 2010–2011)
- Touch as Beth Friedman (2 episodes, 2013)
- The Young and the Restless Mallory (4 episodes, 2019)
  Film
- Pretty Poison (1996) as Sue Ann Stepanek
- Wishmaster (1997) as Shannon Amberson
- Still Breathing (1997) as Brigitte
- Where's Marlowe? (1998) as Heather
- Luck of the Draw (2000) as Rebecca Johnson
- James Dean (2001) (TV) as Julie Harris
- Beacon Hill (2004) as Lauren Reading
- The Inner Circle (2005) as Karen
- Burlesque (2010) as Marla
