= The Invisible Man (2000 TV series) =

- Genre: Science fiction; Action; Comedy-drama; Superhero
- Created by: Matt Greenberg
- Developed by: Carlton Prickett; Breck Eisner
- Starring: Vincent Ventresca; Paul Ben-Victor; Eddie Jones; Shannon Kenny; Mike McCafferty; Brandy Ledford
- Country of origin: United States
- Original language: English
- No. of seasons: 2
- No. of episodes: 46

Production
- Running time: 42 minutes
- Production companies: Stu Segall Productions; USA Cable Entertainment

Original release
- Network: Sci-Fi Channel
- Release: June 9, 2000 – February 2, 2002

The Invisible Man (also shortened to "The I-Man" in season 2) is an American science fiction television series starring Vincent Ventresca, Paul Ben-Victor, Eddie Jones, Shannon Kenny and Michael McCafferty.

The show aired two seasons, from June 9, 2000, to February 1, 2002, on the Sci Fi Channel and was syndicated to American TV stations. It was cancelled by USA Cable Entertainment, Sci Fi's parent company, primarily due to the high production costs of visual effects. For some episodes, budgets went over $1 million. Falling viewership meant advertising revenue was unable to support the high costs.

The series uses elements of science fiction and action to explore themes such as freedom of choice, determinism, and state bureaucracy.

== Plot ==
The Invisible Man is both an action show and a comedy with buddy cop elements.

The plot revolves around Darien Fawkes (Ventresca), a thief facing life imprisonment who is recruited by a spy agency that is constantly short on funds, and is given the power of invisibility via implantation of a special "Quicksilver gland" in his head. The gland allows Fawkes to secrete a light-bending substance called "Quicksilver" from his pores and follicles. The substance quickly coats his skin, hair, nails, clothes, and whatever he is carrying, and renders him invisible. He can consciously release the Quicksilver, which then flakes off and disintegrates. However, the Quicksilver gland was sabotaged at its creation by scientist Arnaud DeFehrn to release a neurotoxin that accumulates in the bloodstream and causes intense pain, followed by antisocial behavior and psychosis. The host requires regular doses of "counteragent" to keep him sane and healthy, which is controlled by the government agency.

There were typically two types of episodes. Many of these were cases that The Agency had provided to Fawkes and Hobbes. These mostly dealt with murders or government experiments gone wrong. Chrysalis, The Agency's enemy agency from the first season, was frequently responsible for the week's plot. Episodes instead focused on Fawkes' struggle to have the organ removed from his skull and/or lessen his dependence on the counteragent. His unconventional means included using his deceased brother's intellect to revive him and occasionally speaking with Arnaud DeFehrn, one of the gland's inventors, albeit these interactions typically ended with one of them being in pain. Since the agency believed that the gland was too valuable to be taken away, Fawkes' personal pursuit frequently put him at odds with those in positions of power.

Episodes usually begin with a voice-over by Fawkes who would open with a famous quote and comment about what he was currently thinking. The voice over would reemerge at the end of the episode to sum up Fawkes' opinion on the mission or allow him to voice lingering questions.

At the conclusion of the series, Fawkes had been given a new counteragent that permanently cured him of quicksilver madness — his body having become gradually immune to the standard counteragent — but after briefly returning to his old thieving career and another stint at the FBI, he returned to the Agency to continue fighting Chrysalis.

== Characters ==
The following is a list of characters featured in the American science fiction series The Invisible Man. This list may not list characters that have only made guest appearances.

=== Main characters ===
Darien Fawkes (Vincent Ventresca)
Darien Fawkes is a former career criminal and catburglar. Darien is described as having an "above-average intellect", and capable of being very deceptive. He and his brother Kevin were raised on a farm by their aunt and uncle after their mother died and their father left them. While Kevin became a scientist, Darien began a career as a thief while still in his teens. After being caught he was sentenced to life in prison.

His brother cut a deal with his bosses to get Darien out of prison in exchange for using him as a test subject. Darien agreed, and became the Quicksilver gland implanted. Due to the gland, he has various powers beyond being able to turn invisible; he can turn his eyes invisible and see in infrared, lower his body temperature lower to a point where he can escape heat-seeking weapons, he can turn others invisible so long as he remains in contact with them, and he can even turn parts of his body invisible while leaving the rest of him fully visible. He then works for the Agency.

==== Robert Albert Hobbes (Paul Ben-Victor) ====
Robert "Bobby" Hobbes is one of the agents working for the Agency. He is given Darien as a partner when Darien joins the Agency. Hobbes feels underappreciated there, receiving very little pay and being sent on mostly unfavorable missions.

Charles Borden a.k.a. The Official (Eddie Jones)
Charles "Charlie" Borden is the long-time head of The Agency.

Albert Eberts (Michael McCafferty)
Albert Eberts came to the Agency from the IRS, and serves as both assistant to The Official and the Agency's bookkeeper.

Dr. Claire Keeply a.k.a. the Keeper (Shannon Kenny)
Claire is The Agency's resident medical doctor and researcher, and was a minor researcher on the team that did preliminary work for developing the Quicksilver gland. She is responsible for monitoring Darien's health and compiling data on long-term usage of the gland. There are hints of romantic tension between her and Hobbes.

Alex Monroe (Brandy Ledford, season two)
Alex Monroe is an addition to the cast in the show's second season. She is a federal agent working for the Agency.

=== Minor characters ===
Dr. Arnaud DeFöhn (Joel Bissonnette)
Terrorist and primary antagonist of Darien Fawkes, being responsible the death of Dariens brother.

Jarod Stark (Spencer Garrett)
The charismatic leader of a branch of the mysterious Chrysalis organization.

Allianora (Idalis DeLeón, season one)
One of Chrysalis' top agents. Through bio-modification she has gained the ability to breathe water and regurgitate it under pressure, making her capable of drowning people with a kiss.

Dr. Kevin Fawkes (David Burke)
Darien's brother and the developer of the Quicksilver gland, he implanted the gland into his brother's brain.

Dr. Thomas Walker/Augustin Gaither (Armin Shimerman)
Formerly a scientist working for the fictional Secret Weapons Research Bureau, the same government facility that helped Kevin Fawkes develop the Quicksilver gland.

== The Agency ==
The Agency is a U.S. government espionage and special operations agency, but extremely secretive – so much that it doesn't have a proper name. The organization takes on cases that the other agencies "can't, won't, or don't".

During the second season, The Agency changed departments several times, having been absorbed by the Bureau of Indian Affairs, the Department of Health and Human Services, and (very briefly) the United States Postal Service before settling in the semi-fictional Bureau of Weights and Measures. This led to a running gag in which Hobbes and Fawkes are never taken seriously as federal agents, since their identifications always includes their unassuming department name.

== Episodes ==
=== Season 1 (2000–01) ===
No. overall	No. in season	Title	Directed by	Written by	Original release date	Prod. code
1	1	"Pilot"	Breck Eisner	Matt Greenberg	June 9, 2000	401
2	2	"Pilot"	Breck Eisner	Matt Greenberg	June 9, 2000	401
Darien Fawkes’ successful career as a burglar comes to a halt when he deviates onto the straight and narrow to save his intended victim. Receiving a life sentence, Fawkes is rescued by his brother who uses him as a test subject in the Quicksilver project. After the project is sabotaged, Fawkes sets out to avenge his brother and rescue himself from the gland inside his brain.
3	3	"The Catevari"	Ian Emes	Paul Greenberg	June 16, 2000	402
Fawkes is sent after an escaped mental patient whose skin is poisonous to the touch, under suspicion that he might one of The Agency's old experiments.
4	4	"Ralph"	Adam Nimoy	Craig Silverstein	June 23, 2000	403
A child witnesses an assassination but refuses to speak to anyone except ‘Ralph’, her invisible best friend. Fawkes must convince her that is exactly who he is before the sniper can kill the witness. At the end, Fawkes calls the Keeper Dr. Jekyll and she calls him Mr. Hyde.
5	5	"Tiresias"	Boris Damast	Story by : Peter Hume & Josh Koch; Teleplay by : Peter Hume	July 7, 2000	404
Fawkes and Hobbes investigate a blind prophet who warns his customers to kill themselves before they kill their loved ones. However, when the man reveals to be aware of Darien's nightmares and the Quicksilver Madness, Darien is afraid the man's newest prophecy - him killing Hobbes under the Quicksilver Madness - might become true.
6	6	"Impetus"	Joshua Butler	Jonathan Glassner	July 14, 2000	407
Searching through rooms in The Agency, Fawkes finds an old woman and sets her free in the belief that she is being used to blackmail the Keeper into working with the Agency, only to learn afterwards that the woman has been infected with a rapid aging disease that begins to affect him as well.
7	7	"The Devil You Know"	James A. Contner	Ashley Gable & Peter Hume	July 21, 2000	406
The Official is arrested after a surveillance operation goes awry. The new leader of The Agency proves to be even more manipulative than The Official so Fawkes and Hobbes take it upon themselves to clear their boss’ name.
8	8	"Liberty and Larceny"	Unknown	Jason Butler	July 21, 2000	405
Fawkes’ old partner in crime appears in town with a job for both of them.
9	9	"The Value of Secrets"	Bruce Seth Green & David Jackson	Marc Cullen & Craig Silverstein	August 4, 2000	408
Fawkes and Hobbes are sent to investigate the theft of a Quantum Computer. During their investigation, Fawkes discovers that this computer may be the key to getting the gland out of his head.
10	10	"Separation Anxiety"	Joshua Butler	Peter Hume	August 11, 2000	409
Hobbes begins stalking his ex-wife only to discover her new fiancée might genuinely be more than what he claims to be.
11	11	"It Hurts When You Do This"	Philip Sgriccia	Unknown	August 18, 2000	410
A fall leaves Hobbes in the hospital with short term memory loss. While roaming the halls, both Fawkes and Hobbes witness strange surgeries that leave them doubtful about the medical ethics of the doctors.
12	12	"The Other Invisible Man"	Joshua Butler	Jason Butler & Craig Silverstein	August 25, 2000	411
Nightmares plague Fawkes as he begins to see another invisible figure around the city. After The Official is attacked, the agents begin looking into the history of Project Quicksilver and learn Darien was not the first test subject after all.
13	13	"Reunion"	Carlton Prickett	Michael Berns & David Levinson & Matt Pyken	September 8, 2000	405
Did Kevin really die in the lab? Fawkes begins to doubt it, especially after he receives a phone call from his supposedly dead brother.
14	14	"Cat & Mouse"	Joshua Butler	Marc Dube	September 15, 2000	413
The Chinese government sets out to capture the invisible agent for their own experiments. Unfortunately, the agent they target is the very visible Hobbes.
15	15	"Beholder"	Jay Tobias	Craig Silverstein	September 22, 2000	414
Fawkes gets too close to an assassin and is blinded by his prototype weapon, with only the gland saving him from permanent loss of vision. While a blind model shows him a new way to experience the world, the agents continue to seek out the killer.
16	16	"Ghost of a Chance"	Ken Girotti	Jonathan Glassner	January 8, 2001	415
Fawkes is sent to Mexico to impersonate a ghost and convince a prime minister to vote in their government's favor. They aren’t the only agency interested in the vote, and the other side has a strangely powered agent too.
17	17	"Flowers for Hobbes"	Jonathan Glassner	Craig Silverstein	January 15, 2001	416
Hobbes is injected with a drug that gives him super intelligence. When everyone else exposed to the drug commit suicide, Claire and Darien set to work to save Hobbes from himself.
18	18	"Perchance to Dream"	Michael Grossman	David Levinson	January 22, 2001	417
Claire attempts to gun down a jogger and, when stopped, she insists the man is trying to kill her. Alarmed, Fawkes and Hobbes investigate a sleep clinic where patients are being fed suggestive dreams.
19	19	"Frozen in Time"	Ken Girotti	Steven D. Binder	January 29, 2001	418
Chrysalis is capturing and freezing scientists to preserve them for future generations. Kate (from episode 1.09) is one of the intended victims and enlists Fawkes’ aid to keep her safe.
20	20	"Diseased"	Michael Grossman	Craig Silverstein	February 5, 2001	419
Fawkes’ cold becomes a serious concern when he begins secreting black quicksilver. Things spiral steadily downward after he is checked into a government hospital where the doctor seems far more interested in harvesting the gland than curing Darien.
21	21	"The Lesser Evil"	Jay Tobias	Eric Morris	February 12, 2001	420
After receiving a copy of his file at the Agency from Allianora, Fawkes discovers there is a plan called Solution Beta. He is approached by Chrysalis to join their organization. After discovering the truth about Solution Beta, Fawkes becomes a double-agent.
22	22	"Money for Nothing: Part 1"	Unknown	Unknown	March 23, 2001	421
The Official uses Fawkes’ invisibility to ‘up the odds’ at a casino. Fawkes later decides stealing money from the backroom is easier. When Fawkes refuses to turn over the money, The Official cuts off his supply of counter agent and Fawkes is sent into a new level of quicksilver madness.
23	23	"Money for Nothing: Part 2"	Jeff Woolnough & Greg Yaitanes	David Levinson	March 30, 2001	422
Fawkes’ euphoria of ‘stage five’ madness continues to lead him down strange paths as he hunts down a doctor that's in a relationship with Arnaud. Hobbes turns to the only man who might be able to cure Fawkes: Arnaud.
24	24	"It's a Small World"	Jay Tobias	Steven D. Binder & Jonathan Glassner	April 6, 2001	423
Allianora and Darien enjoy a night of love-making that results in a camera being inserted into Darien. With Chrysalis able to watch his every move, invisibility isn’t an asset, unless Darien can play decoy for the other agents.

=== Season 2 (2001–02) ===
No. overall	No. in season	Title	Directed by	Written by	Original release date	Prod. code
25	1	"Legends"	Michael Grossman	Craig Silverstein	April 13, 2001	801
Bigfoot is invisible? Fawkes begins to wonder if the gland was inspired by a natural source when he and Hobbes are sent to investigate a series of deaths in the wilderness.
26	2	"The Camp"	Greg Yaitanes	Jonathan Glassner	April 20, 2001	802
A new agent joins The Agency but her agenda revolves entirely around the search and rescue of her baby son.
27	3	"The Importance of Being Eberts"	Michael Grossman	Dean Orion	April 27, 2001	803
When someone begins attempting to hack Agency computers, Eberts becomes a team asset in trying to track the hacker. Yet Eberts’ behavior becomes increasingly erratic until everyone begins wondering how well they really knew him to begin with.
28	4	"Johnny Apocalypse"	Greg Yaitanes	David Levinson	June 15, 2001	804
Monroe sends Fawkes and Hobbes to retrieve Adam, a boy infected with a time release virus. Realizing she intends to kill the boy, Fawkes flees with Adam and searches for anyone that can help, even if that means making deals with Chrysalis.
29	5	"Going Postal"	Bill Norton	Gabrielle Stanton & Harry Werksman	June 22, 2001	805
Fawkes, Hobbes and Monroe each take turns narrating their take on a mission to the post office dead letter office where Hobbes abruptly went mad and attempted to shoot the workers.
30	6	"Brother's Keeper"	Greg Yaitanes	Craig Silverstein	June 29, 2001	806
Using the same method of awakening memories stored in RNA as in episode 1.11, Darien awakens his brother's mind to see if Kevin knows how to extract the gland. Arnaud discovers Kevin's return and kidnaps him in hopes of solving his own quicksilver problems.
31	7	"Insensate"	Michael Grossman	Jonathan Glassner	July 6, 2001	807
A man bereft of all senses except touch appears in Fawkes’ apartment. Calling himself Tommy Walker, the stranger claims to be an escapee from another government experiment. Believing Walker can help in removing the gland, Fawkes sets out to rescue him from SWRB (Secret Weapons Research Branch) an agency which is willing to kill anyone to keep Walker contained. While confronting the foreboding SWRB chief, Fawkes discovers that Tommy Walker was formally the amoral SWRB scientist, Dr. Augustin Gaither. Gaither’s scientific project titled, “Tommy Walker” was xnayed on moral grounds and he tested the experiment on himself - rendering him insensate and amnesic of his former past. Nevertheless, Fawkes and Hobbes rescue Walker/Gaither a second time when the SWRB tries to destroy them.
32	8	"Den of Thieves"	Bill Norton	Gabrielle Stanton & Harry Werksman	July 13, 2001	808
Darien goes undercover as a criminal to help stop a terrorist before he has the chance to implement his plan.
33	9	"Bad Chi"	James A. Contner	Dean Orion	July 20, 2001	809
Darien goes to an acupuncturist when his back begins to annoy him. A pressure point causes the gland to activate and the acupuncturist concludes an invisible agent might be able to solve a problem for her whether he wants to or not.
34	10	"Flash to Bang"	Bill Norton	Craig Silverstein	July 27, 2001	811
After being hit by lightning during an operation against Chrysalis, Fawkes wakes up in the hospital with no memory of who he is. While the doctors try to figure out what the lump on his brain scan means, Chrysalis, The Agency and Arnaud all race to be the first to claim ownership of the John Doe patient.
35	11	"Germ Theory"	George Huang	Tom J. Astle	August 3, 2001	813
An experimental dose of counteragent begins spreading permanent invisibility to those Fawkes comes in contact with. As the agents begin experiencing quicksilver madness, Claire searches for a solution before the counteragent runs out.
36	12	"The Choice"	Michael Grossman	Ann McGrail	August 10, 2001	814
A raid on a Chrysalis baby farm finally returns Alex's baby to her, but it turns out that the baby is the biological son of Jarod Stark and his wife, Alex was only a surrogate mother. But when the foster mother arrives on her doorstep, Monroe has to question who would make a better parent.
37	13	"Immaterial Girl"	Michael Grossman	Jonathan Glassner & David Levinson	August 17, 2001	812
Fawkes begins seeing a woman ghost and the investigation that follows leads him to the woman's daughter, and a very strange murder situation.
38	14	"Father Figure"	Michael Grossman	David Levinson	August 24, 2001	816
Fawkes and Hobbes’ search for a rogue agent sniper leads them to the last person Darien expected to see again: his father. Gloria Stuart (Darian's Grandmother) starred in the 1932 Universal film.
39	15	"A Sense of Community"	Jay Tobias	Gabrielle Stanton & Harry Werksman	September 7, 2001	810
Fawkes and Hobbes are sent to a retirement home for secret agents whose identities have been exposed. Neither are interested in staying, but leaving turns out to be against the rules.
40	16	"The Three Phases of Claire"	Martin Wood	Dean Orion	September 14, 2001	815
Claire is accidentally injected with an experimental truth serum. The drug is said to have three phases; constant babbling, paranoia, and loss of inhibitions. Kidnapped by the terrorist whom the drug was supposed to be tested upon, Claire struggles to hold back all the secrets of Project Quicksilver while Fawkes and Hobbes attempt to track her down. Meanwhile, Thomas Walker is tasked to come up with a antidote for the drug.
41	17	"Exposed"	Ian Barry	Gabrielle Stanton & Harry Werksman	September 28, 2001	817
Tommy Walker's memories as Augustin Gaither are beginning to resurface but as Walker realizes who he used to be, he wonders if he wants to live with the person he is now. After Fawkes informs the others about Walker’s resurfaced memories, Gaither allows himself to be captured by the SWRB. He supposedly lures Darien Fawkes and Hobbes to SWRB to be captured. Hobbes is thrown into a cell and Fawkes is prepped for surgical harvesting of the quicksilver gland, which would kill him. However, Walker/Gaither, having had a change of heart through his experiences with Fawkes, leaves the gland intact and helps Fawkes escape and rescue Hobbes and Alex. When confronted by SWRB chief realizes the formerly amoral scientist’s deception, Gathier locks himself and the SWRB chief in the surgery room where Gaither, having realized the atrocities he and the SWRB have made them monsters, kills himself and the chief by blowing up the SWRB Headquarters - just after Fawkes, Hobbes and Alex manage to escape.
42	18	"The Invisible Woman"	Adam Davidson	Dean Orion	January 4, 2002	819
A Chinese scientist who uses a device to turn invisible tries to enlist Fawkes' aid to remain so indefinitely, as she is hideously scarred, though her government claims she is a terrorist. Fawkes must go behind his employers' backs to find out who he can trust.
43	19	"Mere Mortals"	Michael Grossman	Steven D. Binder	January 11, 2002	818
With the counteragent no longer responding properly, Claire turns off the gland in order to experiment. Darien enjoys the freedom of being able to bungee jump and have casual sex without turning invisible but The Agency has a burglary planned and Fawkes is still the best agent for the job, with or without the invisibility.
44	20	"Possessed"	Michael Grossman	Julie Ferber Frank	January 18, 2002	820
A new counteragent causes problems when it causes quicksilver madness in everyone who touches the quicksilver residues.
45	21	"Enemy of My Enemy"	Craig Silverstein	Craig Silverstein	January 25, 2002	821
Darien discovers a recently un-invisible Arnaud and they must work together to break free from Chrysalis. Arnaud turns on the Agency but leaves behind a possibility to remove the counteragent dependency from the quicksilver gland. Darien pleads to Claire to figure out the formula even though she's risking her job.
46	22	"The New Stuff"	Michael Grossman	Craig Silverstein	February 1, 2002	822
Claire succeeds in altering the gland, freeing Darien from counteragent dependency and Agency control. Though Darien quits and Claire is fired, when Chrysalis begins a new tactic, they reluctantly return to assist The Agency in the fight.

== Broadcasters ==
Country	Alternate title/Translation	TV network(s)	Series premiere	Weekly schedule
Austria		ORF		
Australia		Network Ten		
Brazil	O Homem Invisível	Globo	March 9, 2001	Fridays, at 11:00 a.m.
Canada		Space, syndication		
Croatia	Nevidljivi čovjek	Croatian Radiotelevision (HRT)		
Czech Republic	Neviditelný Muž	Prima, Nova		
Egypt	الرجل الخفي	Channel 2		Daily 9.00 p.m.
Finland	Näkymätön mies	MTV3	2002	Sundays, at 10:00 p.m.
France		TF1		
Germany		RTL 2		
Greece	O Αόρατος Άνθρωπος	Star Channel		
Hungary	A láthatatlan ember	RTL Klub		
Italy		Italia1;Rai 4	July 13, 2004; July 29, 2011	Monday to Fridays 02.00 a.m.; Monday to Friday 18.50
Lithuania	Nematomas Žmogus	Tango TV		Monday to Fridays 7.00 p.m.
Malaysia		TV3		
Netherlands		SBS6		
New Zealand		TV3		
Russia	Человек-невидимка	CTC, TV3 Russia, AXN Sci-Fi		
South Africa		SABC 3		
Slovakia	Neviditeľný Muž	STV 1		
Turkey		MyMax		Monday to Fridays 08.30 p.m.
Ukraine	Людина-невидимка	ICTV		
United States		Sci Fi Channel	June 9, 2000	Fridays 10:00 p.m.
United Kingdom		Sci Fi Channel		Weekdays 19:00 p.m.

== Home media ==
The first season of The Invisible Man was released on DVD for Region 2 as a two-part collection in March and April 2003. The Invisible Man – Season One was released as a complete Region 1 DVD set on March 25, 2008. The Region 1 DVD set also includes the first episode from Season 2.

The Region 1 release, however, contains the alternate version of "Money for Nothing, Part II," (where Hobbes attempts to take Darien into custody) instead of the episode that the fans had chosen (where Hobbes joins forces with Darien). No explanation has been issued for this, and may simply be included on the second Invisible Man DVD release, as it was in the release for the UK.

The Region 1 release also features the episodes in widescreen 16/9, unlike the Region 2 one which had the episodes in full screen 4/3.

The second season is not available on DVD.

=== Streaming ===
Both seasons of the series were available for streaming on the NBC.com app in cropped 4:3 instead of the original widescreen aspect ratio.
