= Unhappily Ever After =

American television sitcom (1995–1999)

- Also known as: Unhappily...
- Genre: Sitcom; Family sitcom; Satire; Black humor; Surreal humor
- Created by: Ron Leavitt; Arthur Silver
- Starring: Geoff Pierson; Stephanie Hodge; Kevin Connolly; Nikki Cox; Justin Berfield; Bobcat Goldthwait; Allan Trautman; Joyce Van Patten; Wendy Benson
- Opening theme: "Hit the Road Jack"; performed by Ray Charles
- Composers: Paul Buckley; Jonathan Wolff
- Country of origin: United States
- Original language: English
- No. of seasons: 5
- No. of episodes: 100 (list of episodes)

Production
- Executive producers: Ron Leavitt; Arthur Silver; Sandy Sprung; Marcy Vosburgh
- Producers: J. Stewart Burns; Brian LaPan; Christina Lynch; Harriette Regan
- Running time: 22–24 minutes
- Production company: Touchstone Television

Original release
- Network: The WB
- Release: January 11, 1995 – May 23, 1999

Unhappily Ever After is an American sitcom television series that aired for five seasons and 100 episodes on The WB from January 11, 1995, to May 23, 1999. Created by Ron Leavitt and Arthur Silver, the former having previously co-created Married... with Children (1987–1997), the series centers on the dysfunctional Malloy family, particularly father Jack Malloy, a used car salesman suffering from schizophrenia who communicates with his imaginary friend, a vulgar talking stuffed rabbit named Mr. Floppy. Jack navigates life with his ex-wife Jennie and their children Ryan, Tiffany, and Ross. The series was produced by Touchstone Television.

== Synopsis ==
The series follows the dysfunctional Malloy family of Los Angeles, California: deadbeat father Jack (Geoff Pierson); toxic and narcissistic mother Jennifer (Stephanie Hodge); underachieving and seemingly dim-witted eldest son Ryan (Kevin Connolly); smart and popular daughter Tiffany (Nikki Cox), academically gifted but rarely taken seriously because she looks like a model; and "forgotten" son Ross (Justin Berfield). In the first two seasons, storylines featured Ryan, Tiffany, and Ross's pill-popping maternal grandmother Maureen Slattery (Joyce Van Patten). In addition to other postmodern literary devices, the show and its characters regularly broke the fourth wall and mocked 1980s and 1990s American culture.

The series was initially written as a starring vehicle for Hodge, whose character Jennifer was the focus of the first few episodes. However, the series soon turned its focus to Jack Malloy, a schizophrenic, alcoholic, and lazy husband who was kicked out of the house in the pilot episode and, in a surrealistic mockery of both ALF and The Muppets, was living in an apartment with his imaginary friend: a foul mouthed, misanthropic, and sarcastic stuffed toy rabbit named Mr. Floppy (performed by Allan Trautman, voiced by Bobcat Goldthwait). By the show's third season, Tiffany Malloy had become the breakout character, and Cox became the de facto co-star of the show along with Pierson. Stories began focusing more on Tiffany and Ryan's escapades at high school, and later at community college.

In the fourth season, producers decided to kill off Jennifer's character, but returned her as a ghost. After continuing to torment her family as a poltergeist known as "Dead Mom", the Malloys realize that the show doesn't work without Jennifer as their common enemy. Jennifer is then brought back to life after a metafictional sequence, commonly used in the show, in which a network executive enters the house and explains to the characters that, due to the jokes no longer being funny, "Dead Mom" is no longer dead. Jennifer then returns and is overjoyed to be restored to life, until she sees the gigantic mess the family left for her to clean up. Jennifer throws a massive temper tantrum and vows to take terrible revenge. Nevertheless, Hodge decided to leave the show anyway. Several episodes after Jennifer's "resurrection", she eloped with a lesbian lover and was never seen again.

The final season focused more on Tiffany and her rival Barbara Caufield (Wendy Benson), Ryan's love interest, joining the cast. The series wrapped up with a final episode in which Jack finally made enough money to send Tiffany to Harvard University. Once Jack was free from Jennifer and started making money, his confidence returned and, with his schizophrenia seemingly "cured", Floppy returned to being just a stuffed animal. However, Jack's relapse in his alcoholism also brought Floppy "back from the dead".

== Characters ==
=== Main ===
- Jack Malloy (portrayed by Geoff Pierson): An alcoholic, schizophrenic, cynical, depressed man who hates his unhappy marriage and wholly unsatisfying used-car-salesman job. His family gives him little respect, thinking him insane or senile. He converses with a stuffed bunny (Mr. Floppy) that only he can hear. He is the family's sole income source, paying for food, expenses, allowances, and gifts for Tiffany. In season one, Jack and Jenny were separated, but Jack moved back home in season two, with the couple still hating each other; they later divorce after Jenny leaves the family in season five.
- Jennifer Malloy (née Slattery; portrayed by Stephanie Hodge; seasons 1–4): Jack's embittered wife, who gets along with nobody and is prone to jealousy. She is sarcastic, self-centered, mean, judgmental, and ill-tempered; she is verbally abusive to Jack and shows her children little compassion. She resents Ryan – as her pregnancy with him forced her to marry Jack – and Tiffany, who is everything she never was. Jennifer often cuckolds Jack, but hypocritically objects when Jack becomes involved with other women. She "dies" during season 4 and haunts the series as a "ghost" until returning briefly. At the start of the fifth season, she has left the family for a lesbian lover.
- Ryan Malloy (portrayed by Kevin Connolly): Jennie and Jack's firstborn and elder son. He maintains a happy-go-lucky attitude despite being stupid and disliked by nearly everyone he knows, including his own parents. His inability to attract girls and his parents' overt derision of him are recurring themes throughout the series. Once in a while, Ryan was presented sympathetically as being aware of his miserable life and regretful that he can't improve it. In one such story, an attractive science teacher told him she'd go with him to a school dance if he passed her class, never expecting that his dim-wit could (and did) do so. When Ryan did pass, she begged him to spare her the humiliation of being linked publicly to him, and he told her that they made a deal and she had no choice but honoring it. She then "accidentally" blew herself up in a lab fire that caused her to be decapitated. Ryan was very sad afterwards, and Tiffany gave him rare support and encouragement.
- Tiffany Malloy (portrayed by Nikki Cox): The middle child and only daughter – and Jack's favorite – who is seemingly "perfect": smart, ambitious, popular, beautiful, and still a virgin—although she is far from virtuous; she tends to be self-indulgent and manipulative and often takes advantage of Jack's special treatment and dresses rather provocative, like a red-headed Pamela Anderson. Whenever she gets into trouble, she will use Ryan or Ross as a scapegoat. She is also a practicing gold digger. Tiffany's figure has been repeatedly alluded to as a result of her suffering from some kind of an eating disorder. She is an overachiever: she covets success and frequently achieves it. She is extremely opinionated and can be very sarcastic, speaking with deadpan humor.
- Ross Malloy (portrayed by Justin Berfield): The youngest son and "forgotten child", who is arguably the most normal family member. Ross is often the voice of reason, common sense, and enlightenment in an otherwise-dysfunctional family. However, certain episodes show that Ross has his own issues. As a result of indifferent parenting, he craves attention, though his attempts usually fail. Despite Jack's lack of concern for him, Ross adores his father, even letting him have his stuffed rabbit Mr. Floppy to keep him company. Ross dislikes his siblings: Tiffany for being a cruel, selfish attention-seeker, and Ryan for being stupid and annoying. The Halloween episode of the final season mentions that Ross once had a twin, Roz, but in a flashback to a decade earlier, they and Tiffany were left in Ryan's "care" for a weekend, and his carelessness caused something unfortunate to happen to Roz.
- Mr. Floppy (performed by Allan Trautman, voiced by Bobcat Goldthwait): A smoking, drinking, perverted, gray stuffed toy bunny who lives in the Malloy basement, often discussing his life in "the toy bin" or his success stories with women, or ranting about cynical topics. Much of the show has Jack consulting Mr. Floppy for advice with Mr. Floppy speaking as a stand-up comic. Only Jack can hear him. While Jack and Mr. Floppy often have differing views, they have similar mindsets, so Mr. Floppy is best seen as Jack's alter-ego. He has a crush on Drew Barrymore.
- Maureen Slattery (portrayed by Joyce Van Patten) (seasons 1–2): Jennifer's alcoholic, domineering, somewhat-delusional mother, and Ryan, Tiffany, and Ross' grandmother who has a prescription drug addiction. She despises Jack (the feeling is more than mutual), but she has even more contempt for her own daughter. Her ex-husband Joe (who is never seen, but frequently mentioned) owns Joe's Used Car Lot, where Jack is employed. She only appeared in the series' first two seasons; in the episode "The Old West", Jack says she is dead and they buried her in the back yard after looting her corpse.
- Barbara Caulfield (portrayed by Wendy Benson; season 5; recurring Season 4): Tiffany's rival and one of Ryan's love interests. She attends Northridge Junior College along with Tiffany and Ryan.

=== Recurring ===
- Emily, Jasper and Annie: The family's pet dogs
- Barry (portrayed by Ant) (seasons 1–4): Tiffany's openly gay friend at Priddy High
- Amber Moss (portrayed by Dana Daurey; seasons 1–3): Tiffany's vacuous best friend at Priddy High
- Mr. Dunn (portrayed by Allan Trautman; seasons 1–3): The principal of Priddy High
- Chelsea (portrayed by Shonda Whipple; season 1): Tiffany's nemesis in season 1
- Beau/Johnny (portrayed by Benjamin Shelfer; seasons 1-4): Tiffany's love interest
- Stoney (portrayed by Jamie Kennedy; season 1): A stoner at Priddy High
- Patty McGurk (portrayed by Elisabeth Harnois; season 2): Tiffany's rival in season 2
- Sable O'Brien (portrayed by Kristanna Loken; season 3): A popular girl at Priddy High and Tiffany's nemesis in season 3.
- Mr. Monteleone (portrayed by Oliver Muirhead; seasons 3–4), Tiffany and Ryan's English teacher
- Eddie the Neuter Boy (portrayed by Tal Kapelner; season 4): A nerd who is often the victim of bullies
- Muffy (portrayed by Deborah Kellner; season 5), Tiffany's best friend at Northridge Junior College

== Episodes ==
Season	Episodes	Originally released	
Season	Episodes	First released	Last released
1	13	January 11, 1995	May 17, 1995
2	22	September 6, 1995	May 22, 1996
3	22	September 8, 1996	May 18, 1997
4	21	September 7, 1997	May 10, 1998
5	22	September 13, 1998	May 23, 1999

== Production notes ==
The series was created by Ron Leavitt and Arthur Silver, who also worked on Married... with Children. Unhappily was often compared to Married... with Children as both series had similar themes.

Unhappily Ever After was one of the four sitcoms that aired as part of the original Wednesday night two-hour lineup that helped launch The WB network (along with The Wayans Bros., The Parent 'Hood and the short-lived Muscle).

=== Theme song and opening sequence ===
When the show first began its run, the original opening started with the "wedding photo" (even though they are moving in it) of the Malloys, with their smiles fading, and showed clips of the father leaving and walking through the slum to his new place. While walking, a man runs by him holding a TV, chased by another man who stops, takes a shooting stance, and fires a gun at the thief. The next clip shows the father as he walks past the first man lying face down, TV near his hands, as he enters his apartment. The theme song played over the opening was Bobcat Goldthwait (and possibly others) singing "We married young, because of cupid. And had three kids, but we were stupid. She kicked me out, she's not my honey. But she still wants me, when she needs money. Now I'm alone, come rain or sunny. But who needs love? I've got my bunny." In the final scene of the final episode, this is the song Jack sings with Mr. Floppy, but with slightly modified lyrics. "I married young, because of cupid. And had three kids, but you were stupid. I could've been rich, instead I'm a loser. But at least we're happy, 'cause you're a boozer. Now I'm alone, come rain or sunny. But who needs love? I've got my bunny."

Beginning with the second season, the series' theme song was "Hit the Road Jack" by Ray Charles; the song is a reference to Jennie kicking Jack out of the house. The opening is a sequence of bizarre events from the first season and the male vocals are lip-synced by Floppy while the female vocals are lip-synced by Jennie, Tiffany and Maureen for seasons 1 and 2, Jennie and Tiffany for seasons 3 and 4, and Tiffany, Jack, Ryan and Ross for season 5. In reruns and syndication, the season 1 opening was replaced with the "Hit The Road Jack" opening with clips from the show.
