= USS Mellette =

1944 Haskell-class attack transport

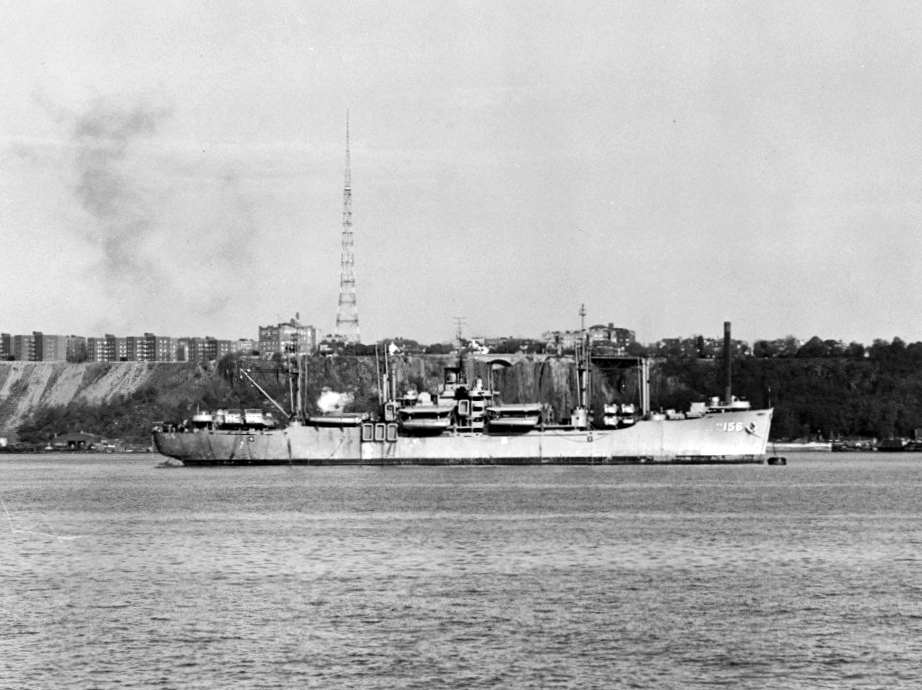

History

United States
- Name: USS Mellette
- Namesake: Mellette County, South Dakota
- Builder: Oregon Shipbuilding
- Launched: 4 August 1944
- Commissioned: 27 September 1944
- Decommissioned: 18 June 1955
- In service: 18 October 1950
- Out of service: 25 June 1946
- Stricken: 1 July 1960
- Honors and awards: 2 Battle stars
- Fate: Scrapped 1988

General characteristics
- Displacement: 6,873 tons
- Length: 455 ft (139 m)
- Beam: 62 ft (19 m)
- Draft: 24 ft (7.3 m)
- Propulsion: Oil Fired Steam Turbine; 1 Shaft
- Speed: 17 knots
- Boats & landing craft carried: 26
- Complement: 56 Officers, 480 Enlisted
- Armament: 1 5"/38 gun; 1 40 mm quad mount; 4 40 mm twin mounts; 10 20 mm single mounts

USS Mellette (APA-156) was a Haskell-class attack transport in service with the United States Navy from 1944 to 1946 and from 1950 to 1955. She was scrapped in 1988.

== History ==
Mellette was a Victory ship design, VC2-S-AP5 and was named after Mellette County, South Dakota, United States. She was launched by Oregon Shipbuilding Corp., Portland, Oregon, 4 August 1944; sponsored by Mrs. Clarissa Bickford; acquired from the United States Maritime Commission on a loan‑charter basis; and commissioned 27 September 1944.

=== World War II ===
In November 1944, Mellette followed a San Pedro shakedown cruise with a voyage to the Hawaiian Islands for training operations. She conducted amphibious troop, gunnery, and tactical exercises off Maui into January 1945. On 27 January she joined TG 51.1 and got underway for Iwo Jima. With units of the 4th Marine Division embarked, she steamed west, via Eniwetok and Saipan, arriving off the Volcano Islands to participate in the initial assault 19 February. She remained off the eastern beaches of Iwo Jima for the next 6 days, unloading supplies and taking on casualties. On the 25th she sailed for Saipan where she disembarked her wounded passengers and began preparations for the upcoming Okinawa campaign.

Through the next month Mellette trained off Tinian's western beaches with TG 51.2 and on 27 March weighed anchor and headed for the Ryukyus. On 1 April she was off Okinawa and at 0631 commenced disembarking units of the 2d Marine Division in diversionary landings along the island's southeastern coast. Her mission completed by mid‑morning, she reembarked her Marines and sailed to the main assault area to stand by until needed. There she remained until ordered back to Saipan on the 11th.

She disembarked the Marines at Saipan on the 14th and remained there until 4 June when she began carrying men and cargo among the Marianas and Solomons. In July she carried reinforcements, the Army's 24th Infantry Regiment, to Kerama Retto. Back at Saipan when the Japanese capitulation was announced, 15 August, Mellette immediately took on men of the 6th Marine Division and sailed for Honshū. Arriving with the first wave of occupation troops, she disembarked the Marines at Yokosuka Naval Base on the 30th, witnessed official surrender in Tokyo Bay 2 September, and then returned to Saipan to take on men of the 2d Marine Division for transportation to Nagasaki.

Next assigned to "Magic Carpet" duty, she completed two voyages between the western Pacific and Seattle before 21 January 1946 when she got underway for the east coast and inactivation. Arriving at Norfolk, Virginia, 3 February, she decommissioned 25 June and entered the Reserve Fleet at Yorktown, Virginia.

=== Cold War ===
With the outbreak of hostilities in Korea, Mellette was reactivated, recommissioning 18 October 1950. For the next 4 years she operated primarily along the east coast, participating in fleet operations and exercises from Nova Scotia to the Caribbean. During that period she served with the 6th Fleet in the Mediterranean 8 September 1953 to 4 February 1954.

=== Fate ===
She decommissioned 18 June 1955 and joined the Charleston, South Carolina, group of the Atlantic Reserve Fleet. Berthed at Charleston for the next 5 years, she was transferred to the National Defense Reserve Fleet in June 1960. Struck from the Naval Register 1 July 1960, she has remained berthed with the James River, Virginia group into 1969. She was sold to Chi Shun Hua Steel Co. Ltd., Kaohsiung, Taiwan for scrapping on 3 June 1988.

== Awards ==
Mellette received two battle stars for World War II service.
