= Shannon Kenny =

Australian actress (born 1968)

- Born: 26 May 1971 (age 55); Australia
- Occupation: Actress
- Years active: 1986–present
- Spouse: Néstor Carbonell (m. 2001)
- Children: 2

Shannon Kenny (born 26 May 1971) is an Australian actress. She is best known for playing Debbie Halliday in the 1980s Australian soap opera Sons and Daughters, and has also appeared in Bodily Harm in 1995, Dream On in 1995, Seinfeld (1997), Purgatory, Batman Beyond (1999–2000), The Invisible Man (2000–2002), and 7th Heaven (2002–2005).

Kenny married Néstor Carbonell on 3 January 2001. They have two sons, Rafael (b. 2002) and Marco (b. 2005).

== Filmography ==
=== Television ===
Year	Title	Role	Notes
1995	Dream On	Katrina Banks	Episode: "Music in My Veins"
1997	Seinfeld	Allison	Episode: "The Susie"
1997	Superman: The Animated Series	Sazu, Female Terrorist (voice)	2 episodes
1999–2001	The Wild Thornberrys	Cody, Gillian Gibson (voice)	2 episodes
1999–2000	Batman Beyond	Inque (voice)	4 episodes
2000–2002	The Invisible Man	Claire Keeply	Recurring role
2002–2005	7th Heaven	Paris Petrowski	Recurring role

=== Film ===
Year	Title	Role	Notes
1995	Bodily Harm	Krystal Lynn, Jacy Barclay	
1999	Purgatory	Dolly Sloan, Ivy	Television film
