= List of Bates Motel characters =

Members of the cast, from left to right; upper row: Highmore, Farmiga, Thieriot, Cooke, Peltz, Carbonell, Vogel; lower row: Eklund, O'Neill, Robertson, Kwiatkowski, Vartan, Creskoff, and Johnson

The following is a list of characters that have appeared in the A&E drama-thriller television series Bates Motel, an adaptation of Robert Bloch's novel Psycho. The series was developed by Carlton Cuse, Kerry Ehrin, and Anthony Cipriano.

== Main characters ==
Character	Portrayed by	Seasons				
Character	Portrayed by	1	2	3	4	5
Norma Louise Bates	Vera Farmiga	Main	Main	Main	Main	Main
Norman Bates	Freddie Highmore	Main	Main	Main	Main	Main
Dylan Massett	Max Thieriot	Main	Main	Main	Main	Main
Emma Decody	Olivia Cooke	Main	Main	Main	Main	Main
Bradley Martin	Nicola Peltz	Main	Main	Guest		
Alex Romero	Nestor Carbonell	Recurring	Main	Main	Main	Main
Caleb Calhoun	Kenny Johnson		Recurring	Main	Guest	Recurring

=== Norma Louise Bates ===
Norma Louise Bates (portrayed by Vera Farmiga) is the series' female protagonist. Norma is depicted as a loving but extremely possessive mother who wants to keep Norman all to herself. As a child, she was abused by her parents and raped by her brother Caleb, and she was also abused by her second husband, Sam (Norman's father). She sees Norman as the only person in the world who loves her, and pulls him closer every time she is in distress.

=== Norman Bates ===
Norman Bates (portrayed by Freddie Highmore) is the series' male protagonist. Norman is depicted as a kind-hearted but deeply troubled boy who has an often unhealthy attachment to Norma. His mother has smothered and sheltered him his whole life, to the point that he is awkward and socially inept, especially around people his own age. As the series progresses, it becomes clear that Norman is mentally ill: he experiences blackouts, during which he hallucinates visions of Norma and behaves violently, before coming to with no recollection of his actions. In seasons three and four, it is becoming clear that he has a split personality, and that his other self – "Mother" – is gaining control.

=== Dylan Massett ===
Dylan Massett (portrayed by Max Thieriot) is Norma's estranged son and Norman's half-brother. Having grown up largely on his own, he is resourceful, strong-willed and independent. He genuinely cares about Norman, but has a difficult relationship with Norma. He believes that Norma seeks out conflict and drama, and that her treatment of Norman will damage him. When he arrives to White Pine Bay, after recently being laid off, Dylan bonds with Norman and encourages him to have a life outside of Norma. He gets involved in the town's illicit marijuana business, and quickly rises up the ranks as he wins favor with his superiors. His world comes crashing down, however, when he learns from Norma that he is the product of an incestuous rape – his true father having been Norma's brother, Caleb – and distances himself from the family, moving out of the Bates' house. He eventually reconnects with his mother and brother in the second season finale. In season three, he becomes increasingly concerned with Norman's behavior, and tries to convince Norma to seek help for him. He also facilitates a reconciliation between Norma and Caleb after reconnecting with his father and starting a legal medicinal marijuana farm of his own, following a DEA raid which wipes out the town's cannabis trade. Throughout the season, he starts to grow close to Emma as she assists in looking after Norman, and attempts to raise the funds for her lung transplant, and the two subsequently form a romantic attachment. Dylan leaves for Seattle with Emma and the two subsequently get married and have a daughter. He finds out online that his mother committed suicide and is furious that Norman did not tell him. He returns to White Pine Bay after fearing for Norman's mental health. Norman later confesses to murder; Dylan visits Norman's hearing but is unable to listen to the charges against his brother. After Norman is freed, he goes to the motel and finds Norman in the kitchen with Norma's corpse. Norman attempts to stab Dylan but is fatally shot by his brother, whom he thanks as he passes away. Dylan then returns to Seattle to be with Emma and their daughter.

=== Emma Decody ===
Emma Decody (portrayed by Olivia Cooke) is Norman's best friend. A sufferer of cystic fibrosis, Emma is often seen carrying an oxygen tank. Although Emma is British, having been born in Manchester (as was Cooke, in real life), she was brought up in the United States and speaks with the local dialect. Identifying with his unusual personality, troubled history and friendly nature, Emma is immediately infatuated with Norman and develops a friendship with him. Norman in turn finds himself warming to her, and, at the request of her father, respects her feelings for him. Seeing this, Norma becomes fond of her and employs Emma at the motel to keep her close to Norman, as well as to provide her with some much-needed maternal support and advice. Her friendship with Norman becomes strained, however, when he allows his feelings for Bradley Martin to get in the way. In addition, she becomes upset when Norma begins to blatantly keep secrets from her or tell her false stories to explain some of Norman's strange actions, and contemplates resigning from the motel. Norman ultimately reaffirms his loyalty to her when he angrily berates his girlfriend, Cody, for egging Emma to do a cliff jump into a lake, clogging her airway and nearly killing her. He later convinces her to stay at the motel by telling her the truth about Dylan's birth, explaining why Norma would not answer her questions. In season three, Emma has a short-lived relationship with Norman, but they later decide to remain friends. She soon grows close to Dylan, who becomes concerned when he learns that Emma's health has deteriorated severely, and takes it upon himself to raise the money she needs for a lung transplant. This, in turn, leads to the two starting a romantic relationship.

=== Bradley Martin ===
Bradley Martin (portrayed by Nicola Peltz) is a kind, attractive and popular classmate of Norman. Bradley immediately takes a shine to Norman, inviting him to his first party and introducing him to her boyfriend. Her world takes a turn for the worse, however, when her father is burned to death, and in her time of grief, she ends up having sex with Norman. Regretting it, she attempts to make amends with him, but accidentally alienates him further. She also wins the ire of Norma and Emma, who become jealous of the attention Norman gives her. With Dylan's help, she finds out who her father's murderer was, and ends up shooting him dead. With blood on her hands, Bradley turns to Norman once more, and, with his help, flees White Pine Bay to go into hiding in Boston. She later returns in season three and, lonely, seeks comfort in Norman. She asks him to speak to her mother, who thinks she's dead, but changes her mind upon learning that her mother has quickly adjusted to being without her husband and daughter. Afterwards, she feels the only person she has left in the world is Norman. She decides that it is best for her to leave town once again and pleads for Norman to come with her. He accepts, but Norman (in his "Mother" persona) kills Bradley by repeatedly bashing her head against a rock.

=== Alex Romero ===
Alex Romero (portrayed by Nestor Carbonell) is White Pine Bay's sheriff in a very awkward position. He tolerates the town's open marijuana cultivation, but only because he knows that the town's economy depends on it, and comes down hard on any gang-related murders. He maintains a stoic, hardened demeanor, both on and off the job. His interaction with the Bates family does not go smoothly, when he suspects Norma's complicity in the disappearance (and death) of Keith Summers, his friend and the former motel owner. Over time, he comes to warm to Norma, but often finds himself having to clean up her messes, including murdering a man threatening her, or pinning the blame for one of Norman's murders on somebody else. When a call girl staying at the motel gets shot and, upon dying, gives Norma a USB drive that contains a financial ledger splitting up an investment return of at least $15 million (illegal revenue from the drug trade), Romero must protect Norma, while investigating those listed on it, including his imprisoned father who used to be sheriff. When it is revealed that Norma lied to him about her husband's death, their friendship suffers and is nearly at an end. Romero must also fight those seeking the ledger in order to keep his job and save his own life. In season four, after Norman is committed for psychiatric observation, Romero's relationship with Norma changes suddenly into a romantic one. He is eventually arrested on perjury charges and is sent to prison. He escapes in season 5 and kidnaps Norman and forces him to take him to where he hid Norma's body. After telling Norma that he will always love her, he is shot by Norman in his "mother" persona. Before he dies, Romero tells Norman that he killed his own mother and Norman can't hide from that.

=== Caleb Calhoun ===
Caleb Calhoun (portrayed by Kenny Johnson) is Norma's estranged older brother, Norman's uncle and Dylan's biological father. In season two, Caleb arrives at the Bates Motel but Norma immediately throws him out. However, Caleb bonds with Dylan, saying he helped protect Norma from their abusive father when they were children. Dylan defends Caleb to Norma, but he also repeatedly raped her for years during their childhood. This then escalates into a fight between Norman and Dylan until Norma intervenes by revealing that Caleb is Dylan's father. After Norman (in Norma's persona) attacks him for the rape, Caleb leaves town. He returns to help Dylan with a "pot farm" by building a barn. Dylan grows closer to Caleb and ponders telling Norma about his return, which is hastened by Norman and Emma spotting Caleb at the remote cabin. Norma and Caleb have an emotional reunion in which he apologizes to her, but she does not completely forgive him. After a curious neighbor to the farm seeks a gun runner to Canada, Caleb offers to take the job; however, Dylan also needs the money to help Emma so he accompanies him. The dropoff is supposed to have been the neighbor's demise, and Caleb manages to save Dylan. He then returns to beat the neighbor until he promises to leave Dylan alone and give them the promised money. Caleb leaves again, but not before telling Norma about Norman attacking him in the "Mother" persona.

== Recurring characters ==
=== Introduced in season one ===
- Deputy Zack Shelby (Mike Vogel)
- Jake Abernathy (Jere Burns)
- Miss Blaire Watson (Keegan Connor Tracy)
- Ethan Chang (Terry Chen)
- Remo Wallace (Ian Tracey)
- Gil Turner (Vincent Gale)
- Will Decody (Ian Hart / Andrew Howard)
- Jiao (Diana Bang)
- Richard Sylmore (Richard Harmon)
- Sam Bates (David Cubitt)
- Gunner (Keenan Tracey)
- Regina (Aliyah O'Brien)
- Dr. Fumhiro Kurata (Hiro Kanagawa)
- Lissa (Brittney Wilson)

=== Introduced in season two ===
- George Heldens (Michael Vartan)
- Christine Heldens (Rebecca Creskoff)
- Jodi Morgan (Kathleen Robertson)
- Zane Morgan (Michael Eklund)
- Nick Ford (Michael O'Neill)
- Cody Brennen (Paloma Kwiatkowski)
- Amelia Martin (Lini Evans)
- Jimmy Brennen (Michael Rogers)
- Deputy Jeffcoat (Matthew Mandzij)
- Declan Rogers (Francis X. McCarthy)
- Deputy Patty Lin (Agam Darshi)

=== Introduced in season three ===
- Charles "Chick" Hogan (Ryan Hurst)
- Bob Paris (Kevin Rahm)
- Liz Babbitt (Anika Noni Rose)
- Annika Johnson (Tracy Spiridakos)
- James Finnigan (Joshua Leonard)
- Marcus Young (Adetomiwa Edun)

=== Introduced in season four ===
- Dr. Gregg Edwards (Damon Gupton)
- Rebecca Hamilton (Jaime Ray Newman)
- Julian Howe (Marshall Allman)
- Dickie Bolton (Terence Kelly)
- Audrey Ellis (Karina Logue)
- Nurse Penny (Kelly-Ruth Mercier)
- Vicki Monroe (Fiona Vroom)
- Howard Collins (Craig Erickson)
- Doctor Guynan (Louis Ferreira)

=== Introduced in season five ===
- Marion Crane (Rihanna)
- Madeleine Loomis (Isabelle McNally)
- Sam Loomis (Austin Nichols)
- Sheriff Jane Greene (Brooke Smith)
- Julia Ramos (Natalia Cordova-Buckley)
- Jim Blackwell (John Hainsworth)
