= Bates Motel season 3 =

Season of television series

Bates Motel
- Season 3
- Promotional poster and home media cover art
- Starring: Vera Farmiga; Freddie Highmore; Max Thieriot; Olivia Cooke; Kenny Johnson; Nestor Carbonell
- No. of episodes: 10

Release
- Original network: A&E
- Original release: March 9 – May 11, 2015

Season chronology
- ← Previous; Season 2 Next → Season 4

The third season of Bates Motel consisted of 10 episodes and broadcast on A&E from March 9 to May 11, 2015. The series itself is described as a "contemporary prequel" to the 1960 film Psycho, following the life of Norman Bates and his mother Norma prior to the events portrayed in the Hitchcock film. The series takes place in the fictional town of White Pine Bay, Oregon.

The season received positive reviews from television critics, and the premiere episode drew in a total of 2.14 million viewers. For their performances in this season, Vera Farmiga and Freddie Highmore were nominated for Critics' Choice Television Awards for Best Actress and Best Actor in a Drama Series, respectively. Season 3 ranked fourth on Nielsen's year-end list of top Live + 7 day programs, gaining an average of 201.8% viewers on DVR. The season was released on Blu-ray and DVD on October 13, 2015.

== Cast and characters ==
=== Main ===
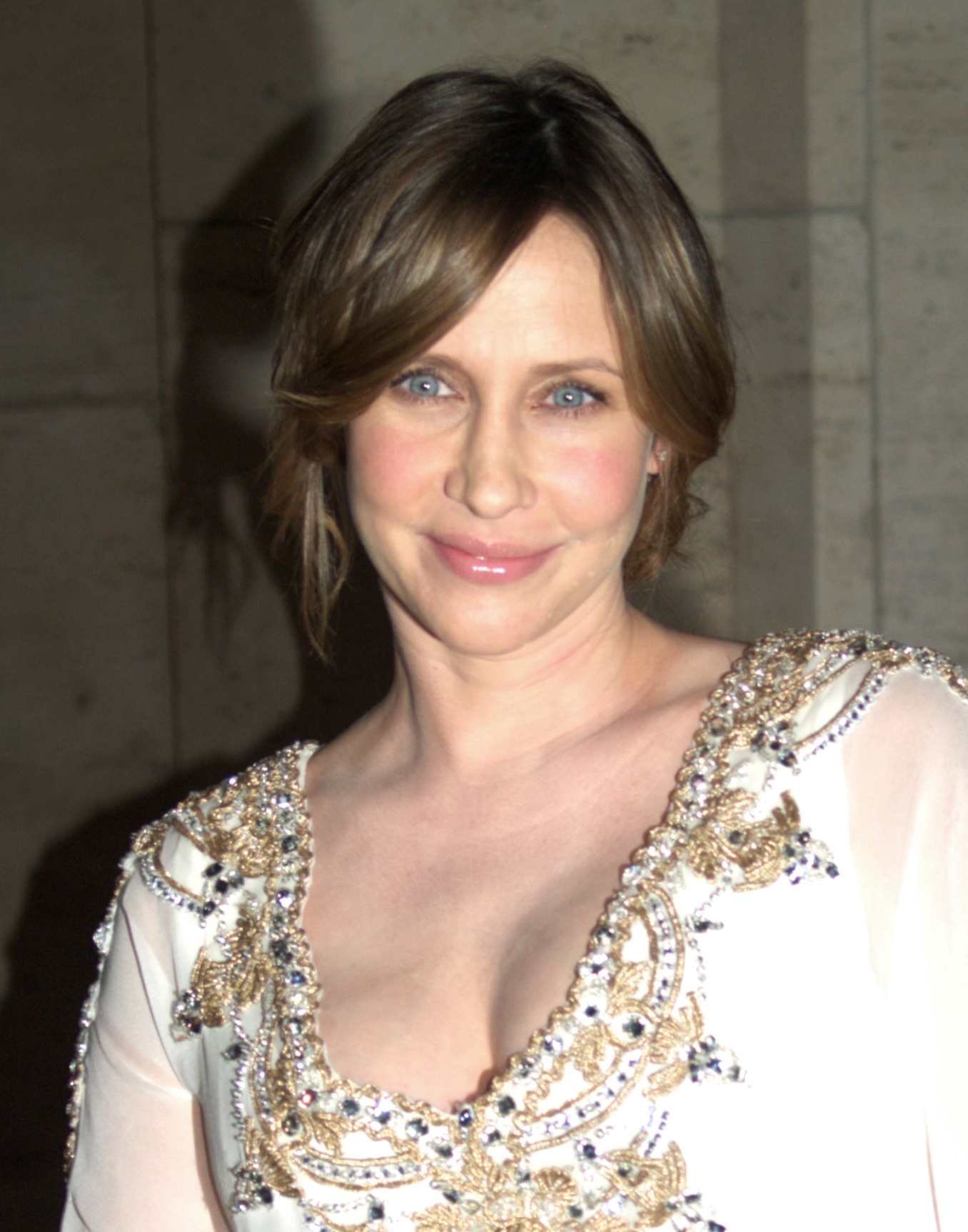
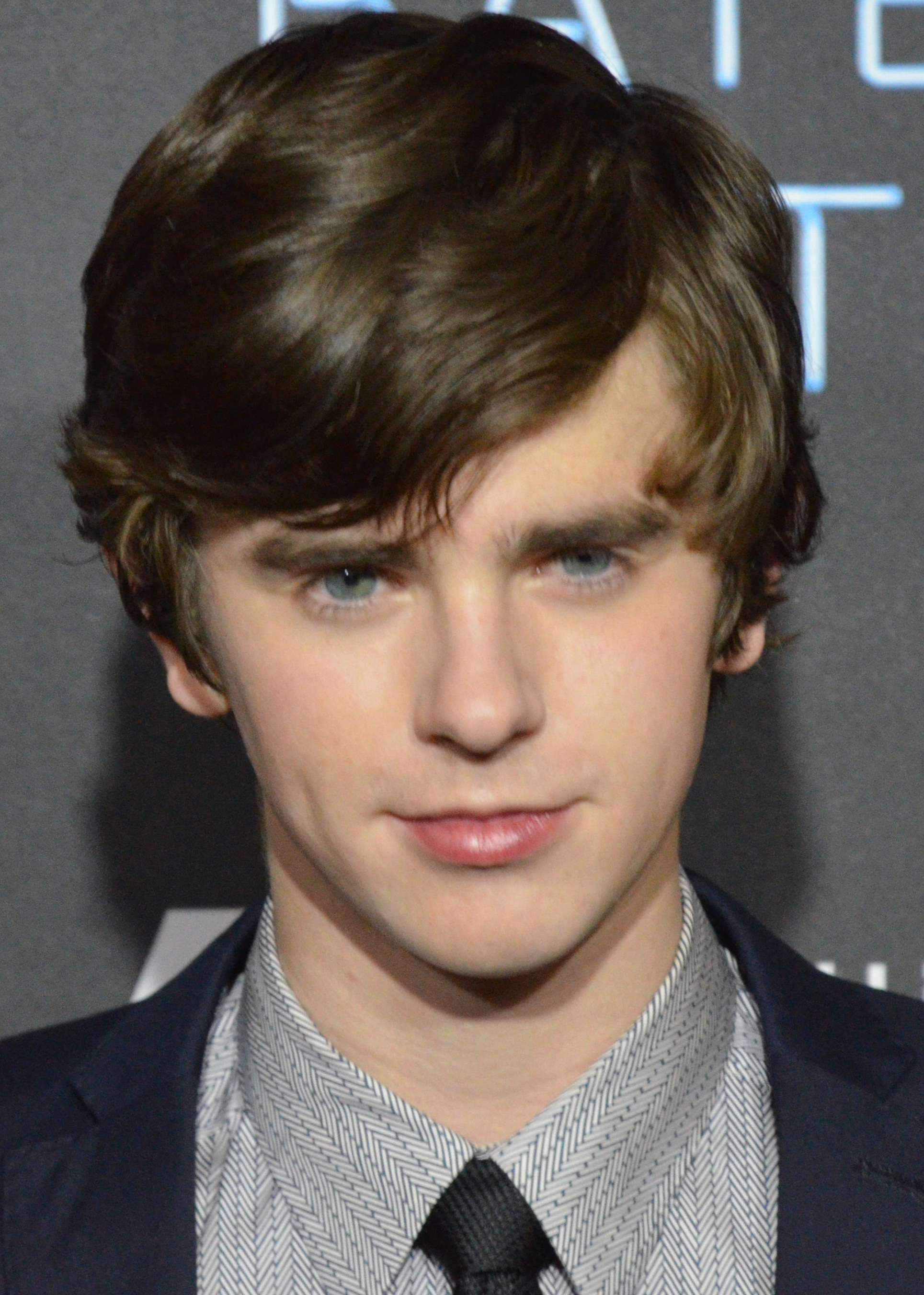
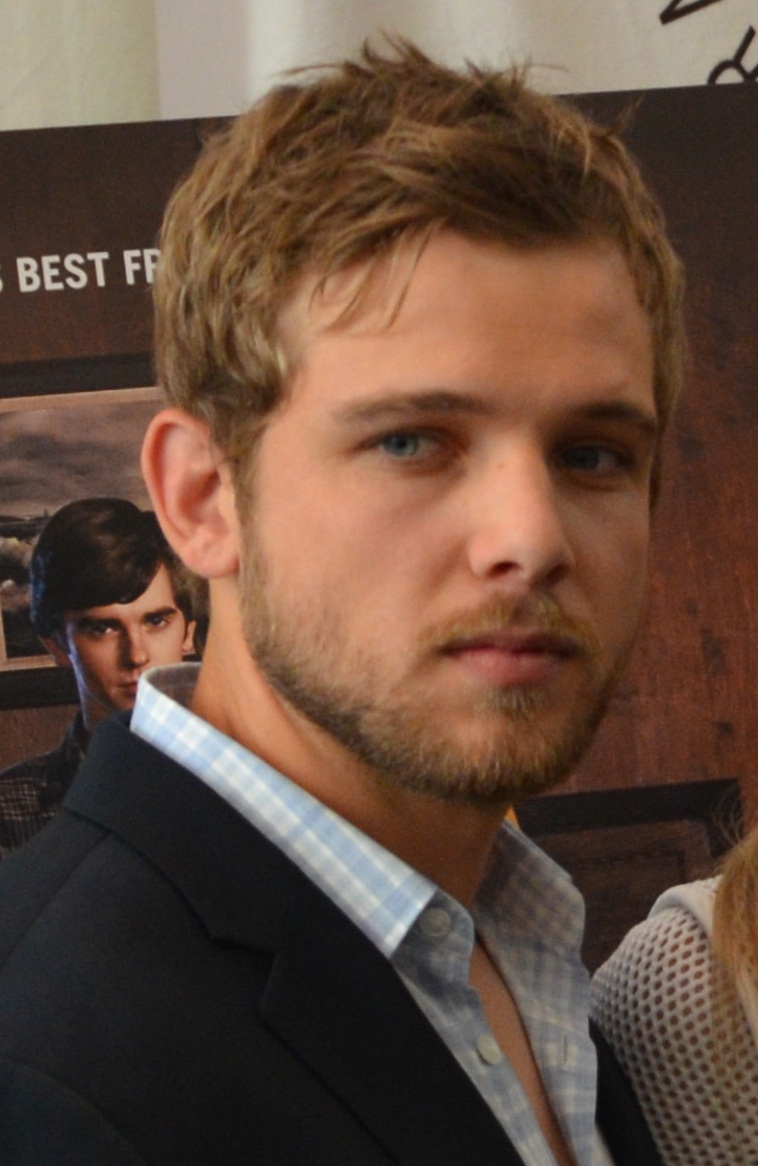
Vera Farmiga, Freddie Highmore, and Max Thieriot (left to right) portray leading roles Norma Louise Bates, Norman Bates, and Dylan Massett, respectively, who appear in all episodes.
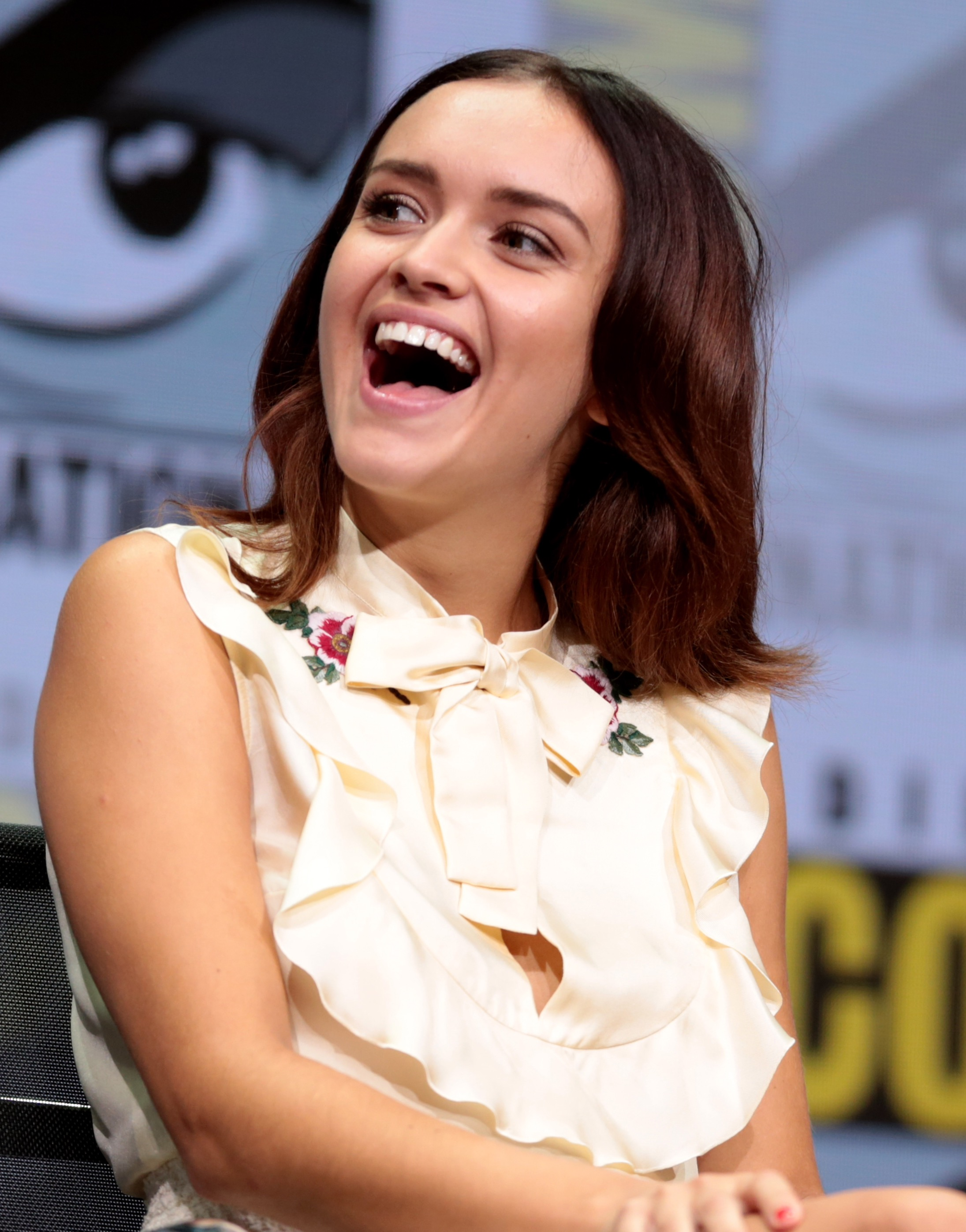
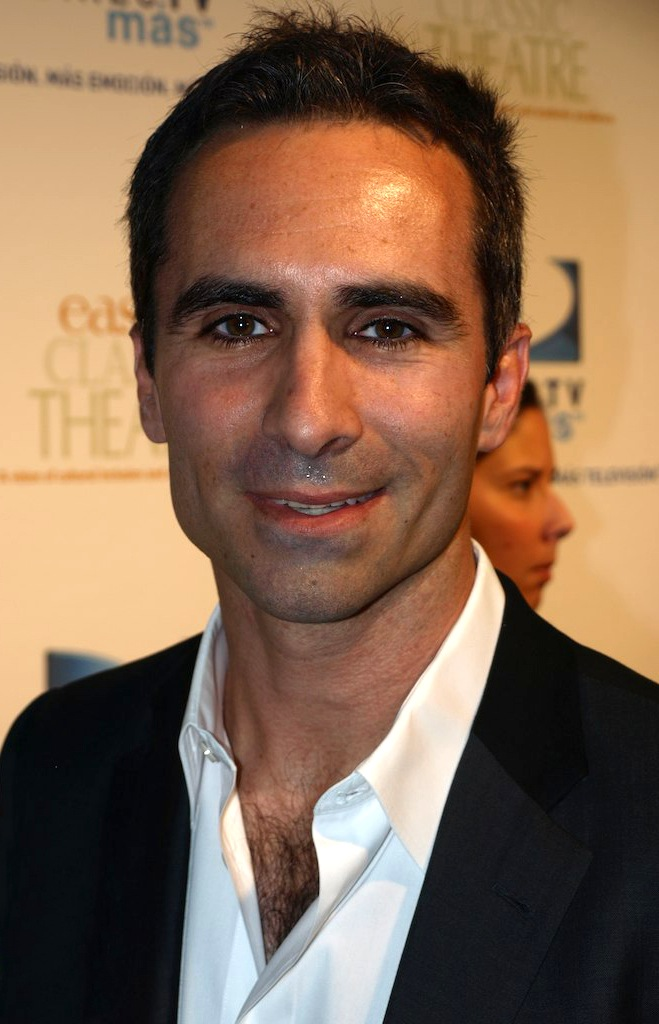
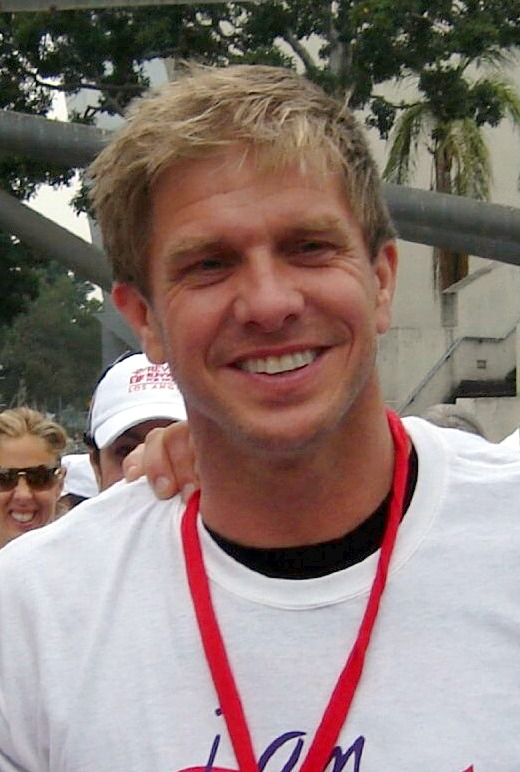
Olivia Cooke, Nestor Carbonell, and Kenny Johnson (left to right) portray Emma Decody, Sheriff Alex Romero, and Caleb Calhoun, respectively.
- Vera Farmiga as Norma Louise Bates
- Freddie Highmore as Norman Bates
- Max Thieriot as Dylan Massett
- Olivia Cooke as Emma Decody
- Kenny Johnson as Caleb Calhoun
- Nestor Carbonell as Sheriff Alex Romero

=== Recurring ===
- Kevin Rahm as Bob Paris
- Keenan Tracey as Gunner
- Ryan Hurst as Chick Hogan
- Joshua Leonard as James Finnigan
- Peter Stebbings as Bob's Employee
- Adetomiwa Edun as Marcus Young
- Andrew Howard as Will Decody
- Nicola Peltz as Bradley Martin
- Tracy Spiridakos as Annika Johnson
- Anika Noni Rose as Liz Babbitt

=== Guest ===
- Wilson Bethel as Taylor
- Emiliano Díez as Alex's Dad
- Tom McBeath as Stanley
- Keegan Connor Tracy as Miss Blair Watson

== Production ==
=== Casting ===
Nicola Peltz returned to the series as Bradley Martin following an 8-episode absence in season 2. Kenny Johnson was upgraded to the main cast after recurring as Caleb Calhoun, Norma's brother, in the second season. Ryan Hurst was cast in the recurring role of Chick Hogan, described as a character that will butt heads with Caleb throughout the season. Tracy Spiridakos was then confirmed to star in the recurring role of Annika Johnson, a guest at the motel. Kevin Rahm joined the cast as Bob Paris, one of Romero's childhood friends whom he now has a strained relationship with. Joshua Leonard was cast in the recurring role of James Finnigan, a community college psychology professor who forms a connection with Norma.

=== Filming ===
The series was filmed on location in Aldergrove, British Columbia. At the beginning of the first season, a replica of the original Bates Motel set from the film Psycho was built on 272nd Street. Principal photography for season 3 began on October 20, 2014 in Vancouver and the surrounding areas, and was completed on March 1, 2015. During an interview in June 2015, Farmiga revealed that she was injured while filming the final scene of the season with Nicola Peltz and Freddie Highmore, resulting in her having to go to the emergency room.

== Episodes ==
No. overall	No. in season	Title	Directed by	Written by	Original release date	US viewers (millions)
21	1	"A Death in the Family"	Tucker Gates	Carlton Cuse & Kerry Ehrin	March 9, 2015	2.14
Summer has passed. Norman, now a high school senior starting his first day, hallucinates about Miss Blair Watson, the teacher he previously killed back in season 1. Because of this, Norma decides to homeschool him to keep a closer eye on him. Dylan confronts Norma about letting Norman sleep in her bed, and, as a result, she sets some boundaries with Norman. Meanwhile, Norma learns that her estranged mother has recently died. She initially doesn't show emotion, but later softens. Her brother Caleb returns to town, seeking to bond with Dylan, now the only family he has left. Meanwhile, Norman takes an immediate interest in the motel's new guest, Annika Johnson, but he decides to finally ask Emma out on a date, seeking normalcy. Emma also decides to leave school and join Norman in homeschooling as well.
22	2	"The Arcanum Club"	Tucker Gates	Kerry Ehrin	March 16, 2015	1.91
Norma becomes curious when Annika goes missing, especially after Norman lied about not being with her the night before and Emma stating otherwise. Norma and Emma investigate Annika's motel room, where they find an invitation to the Arcanum Club, a gentlemen's club on the outskirts of town. Norma infiltrates the club's grounds, only to be caught by Sheriff Romero, who offers to look for Annika. On the way home, Norma mows down the bypass construction sign with her car. Meanwhile, Norman and Emma go on their first date and discuss sex as an important step into adulthood. Elsewhere, Chick Hogan, a bearded hippy-type who lives in a shack in the woods over the hill from Dylan's cabin, comes to visit and discusses the "crops".
23	3	"Persuasion"	Tim Southam	Steve Kornacki & Alyson Evans	March 23, 2015	1.92
Sheriff Romero asks Norma to come to the morgue to identify a woman's body. Norma is relieved that it is not Annika, but worries because she is still missing. Romero meets with Bob Paris, who runs the Arcanum Club, who mentions the upcoming sheriff election as a threat to stop asking questions. While investigating the dead woman's identity, Romero meets Marcus Young, a man who claims to be running for sheriff and vows to unseat Romero for the job. Meanwhile, Norma decides to go take a business course at a local community college, but inadvertently enters a psychology class. The professor, James Finnigan, offers her his future assistance. At home, Norman becomes increasingly frustrated that his mother doesn't trust him and blacks out, submerging himself in a bathtub, hoping to recall the events before Annika's disappearance so as to see if he had anything to do with it. Norma saves him, then locks up the motel. Annika arrives with a gunshot wound to the abdomen. She gives Norma a USB drive before dying, telling Norma to use it to save herself and her son.
24	4	"Unbreak-Able"	Christopher Nelson	Erica Lipez	March 30, 2015	1.71
Norma is adamant to learn what is on the USB drive, which is password protected. She asks for Dylan's help in the decryption. Norman grows more suspicious over Annika's death and the secrecy between his mother and half-brother. Emma tries to calm him by inviting him on a picnic hike, during which he mentions Norma's suggestion that he shouldn't have sex with the ailing Emma. Furious, Emma tells Norman that only she herself best understands her own limits, then storms off. Meanwhile, Caleb injures himself at the cabin, and Dylan tends to him, learning more about his family's history. Norman follows Dylan, discovers Caleb, and threatens to tell their mother that Dylan has been betraying her. Dylan begs him not to spoil the good relationship he has been struggling to build with her, but Norman doesn't listen. Elsewhere, Bob Paris begins looking for the USB drive by ransacking the motel office by sending a henchman. Dylan, after chasing him away, tells Norma it would be better to hide the flash drive at his farm.
25	5	"The Deal"	Néstor Carbonell	Scott Kosar	April 6, 2015	1.76
A man causes Norma to get into a car accident, telling her to call Bob Paris and give him the USB drive. Dylan meets Norma at the hospital and insists on giving the flash drive to Romero for safekeeping. Meanwhile, Norman gets confused over recent events, thinking Norma had left in a different dress, and that he had already told her about Caleb when he hasn't. He steals a dress from Norma's closet. Romero meets with Bob, who admits to looking for the USB drive but does not reveal its contents. Gunner finds and decrypts the flash drive and it reveals a financial ledger splitting up an investment return of at least $15 million (illegal revenue from the town's marijuana drug trade). Dylan tells Norma about the USB contents, who then tells Romero, and the two visit Bob Paris, who agrees to building her a pool and placing a billboard for the motel near the bypass in exchange for the USB. When her sons calmly try to explain that Caleb has been staying with Dylan, an enraged Norma packs a suitcase, gun included, and storms out.
26	6	"Norma Louise"	Phil Abraham	Kerry Ehrin	April 13, 2015	1.69
Norma travels to Portland, Oregon, where she buys a new outfit, trades for a newer car, and ultimately ends up at James' house, where she tells him of Norman's history of blackouts, including killing his father. Back home, Dylan struggles with Norman's separation anxiety, which includes a mental breakdown where Norman completely assumes Norma's personality by cooking him breakfast in her robe and talking like her. Meanwhile, Sheriff Romero gets shot and is hospitalized. He is visited by Marcus Young, who tells him that his time as sheriff is nearing an end. Romero follows Marcus to the parking garage and shoots him dead. Norma realizes that she is still a mother and returns home to honor her sons' wishes to meet Caleb, who breaks down and apologizes upon seeing her.
27	7	"The Last Supper"	Ed Bianchi	Philip Buiser	April 20, 2015	1.69
Dylan starts growing closer to Emma, and learns from her dad that she is a lot sicker than she wants to admit. Meanwhile, Norma tells Romero where the USB drive is so he has leverage over Bob. Romero discovers that his mother's name is on the USB's financial ledger, which leads him into an awkward and painful confrontation with his father in jail. He learns that his father used his mother's name in order to get drugs into the prison. Meanwhile, Norma asks James to help Norman, who, in turn, asks some inappropriate questions and ultimately attacks him. James tells Norma that her son needs help. Norma then cooks a family dinner in order to get closer to Norman. Dylan invites Emma, and Norma invites Caleb. Romero also stops by. Caleb's presence at the dinner angers Norman deeply.
28	8	"The Pit"	Roxann Dawson	Bill Balas	April 27, 2015	1.76
As part of the deal for the USB, Bob has a construction crew begin to dig a hole for the swimming pool at the Bates Motel, even though it ends up being 23 feet deep. Bob then abducts and tortures James to get information about Norma. When Romero goes to caution Bob about messing with Norma, Bob reveals to him Norma's relationship with James and, more importantly, that Norman killed his father. Romero subsequently ends his friendship with Norma when she continues to lie by maintaining that her husband died in an accident. Meanwhile, Dylan and Caleb transport Chick's guns to Canada, only to learn the deal was a setup to have Chick murdered. Caleb saves Dylan after a shootout ensues. James leaves town, but not before informing Norma that he told Bob everything. She warns Norman, and the two argue. Experiencing another blackout, Norman hallucinates his deceased dog, Juno, and runs after him, out of the house. He then discovers Bradley has returned to town.
29	9	"Crazy"	Tucker Gates	Steve Kornacki & Alyson Evans & Torrey Speer	May 4, 2015	1.73
Bradley asks Norman to explain to her mother that she is very much alive. However, upon arriving, she finds that her mother has quickly recovered from the loss of both her husband and daughter. This causes Bradley to feel alone in the world, and she tries to bond with Norman, to the point of trying to have sex with him. He envisions Norma being with them and leaves, thinking that Norma is accompanying him. Meanwhile, Norma tells Bob that she will give him the USB drive, telling him that what James said wasn't true. Bob states that she no longer has anything to bargain with. She then ransacks Romero's house, only to learn from him that the DEA is investigating the financial ledger. Their argument hinges on Romero wanting to know the truth about the death of Norman's father, to which Norma ultimately states that they both know who killed him, implying Norman. Caleb beats Chick for the delivery money, gives it to Dylan, and leaves town after telling Norma about Norman once attacking him in her persona. Dylan gives Emma's father the money for her future lung transplant.
30	10	"Unconscious"	Tucker Gates	Carlton Cuse & Kerry Ehrin	May 11, 2015	1.67
After learning Caleb has left town, Dylan receives a call from Emma's father with news that she disappeared after she learned about her lung transplant. Dylan finds her at the cabin, fearful of her body rejecting the transplant and dying. He calls her the strongest woman that he has ever met, and they kiss. Meanwhile, the DEA plans to arrest Bob at his house, but Romero calls to warn him in advance. Bob goes to a boat at the marina to find Romero waiting on him. Bob compares him to his imprisoned father, and Romero shoots him dead. Norma meets with an asylum administrator in hopes to admit Norman, only to be told admission costs start at $20,000 a month. She mentions the news to Norman, who plans to leave town with Bradley. Norman and Norma argue, with Norma knocking Norman unconscious, dragging him to the basement, and calling Dylan, who confirms that Bradley isn't dead. Norman escapes from the basement and runs off with Bradley, but envisions Norma wishing to speak to her. As Norma, he pulls Bradley out of the car, chases her, and repeatedly bashes her head against a rock, killing her. Norman then rolls the car into White Pine Bay, as he and his envisioned mother watch it submerge.

== Reception ==
=== Critical response ===
The season has received positive reviews from television critics. It received 72 out of 100 from Metacritic, based on 5 television critic reviews, indicating "generally favorable" reviews. Review aggregator website Rotten Tomatoes reported that 11 out of 12 critical responses were positive, averaging a 92% rating. The site's consensus reads, "Bates Motel further blurs lines around TV's creepiest taboo mother/son relationship, uncomfortably darkening its already fascinating tone".

=== Ratings ===
Overall, the third season averaged 1.80 million viewers, with a 0.7 ratings share in the 18–49 demographic.

Viewership and ratings per episode of Bates Motel season 3
No.	Title	Air date	Rating/share (18–49)	Viewers (millions)	DVR (18–49)	DVR viewers (millions)	Total (18–49)	Total viewers (millions)
1	"A Death in the Family"	March 9, 2015	0.9	2.14	0.5	1.26^{[A]}	1.6	3.40
2	"The Arcanum Club"	March 16, 2015	0.8	1.91	0.6	1.72^{[A]}	1.4	3.63
3	"Persuasion"	March 23, 2015	0.8	1.92	0.6	1.83^{[A]}	1.4	3.75
4	"Unbreak-Able"	March 30, 2015	0.7	1.71	0.6	1.63^{[A]}	1.3	3.34
5	"The Deal"	April 6, 2015	0.7	1.76	0.7	1.63	1.4	3.38
6	"Norma Louise"	April 13, 2015	0.7	1.69	0.8	1.66	1.5	3.35
7	"The Last Supper"	April 20, 2015	0.7	1.69	0.8	1.58	1.5	3.27
8	"The Pit"	April 27, 2015	0.7	1.76	0.5	1.54^{[A]}	1.2	3.30
9	"Crazy"	May 4, 2015	0.7	1.73	0.6	1.36	1.3	3.09
10	"Unconscious"	May 11, 2015	0.6	1.67	0.7	1.30	1.3	2.97

- A Cable Live +3 data is used here as Live +7 was not made available.

=== Awards and nominations ===
In its third season, Bates Motel was nominated for 10 awards, winning one.

Year	Awards	Category	Nominee(s)	Result	Ref.
2015	5th Critics' Choice Television Awards	Best Actor in a Drama Series	Freddie Highmore	Nominated	
2015	5th Critics' Choice Television Awards	Best Actress in a Drama Series	Vera Farmiga	Nominated	
2015	19th Online Film & Television Association Awards	Best Supporting Actress in a Drama Series	Vera Farmiga	Nominated	
2015	42nd Saturn Awards	Best Action-Thriller Television Series	Bates Motel	Nominated	
2015	42nd People's Choice Awards	Favorite Cable TV Drama	Bates Motel	Nominated	
2015	17th Women's Image Network Awards	Best Drama Series	Bates Motel	Nominated	
2015	17th Women's Image Network Awards	Best Actress – Drama Series	Vera Farmiga	Nominated	
2015	Fangoria Chainsaw Awards	Best TV Actress	Vera Farmiga	Nominated	
2015	41st Gracie Awards	Outstanding Female Actor in a Leading Role in a Drama	Vera Farmiga	Won	
2015	63rd Golden Reel Awards	Television – Short Form, Music	Michael Ryan	Nominated	
The listed years are of television release, annual ceremonies are usually held the following year
