= Bates Motel season 2 =

Bates Motel
- Season 2
- Promotional poster and home media cover art
- Starring: Vera Farmiga; Freddie Highmore; Max Thieriot; Olivia Cooke; Nicola Peltz; Nestor Carbonell
- No. of episodes: 10

Release
- Original network: A&E
- Original release: March 3 – May 5, 2014

Season chronology
- ← Previous; Season 1 Next → Season 3

The second season of Bates Motel consisted of 10 episodes and broadcast on A&E from March 3 to May 5, 2014. The series itself is described as a "contemporary prequel" to the 1960 film Psycho and follows the life of Norman Bates and his mother Norma in the fictional town of White Pine Bay, Oregon prior to the events portrayed in the Hitchcock film.

The season received positive reviews from television critics, and the premiere episode drew in a total of 3.07 million viewers. Bates Motel was renewed for a third season after five episodes of the second season had aired. For her performance as Norma Louise Bates, Vera Farmiga received nominations for the 2014 Critics' Choice Television Award for Best Actress in a Drama Series and the 2014 Saturn Award for Best Actress on Television. The season was released on Blu-ray and DVD on October 7, 2014.

== Cast and characters ==
=== Main ===
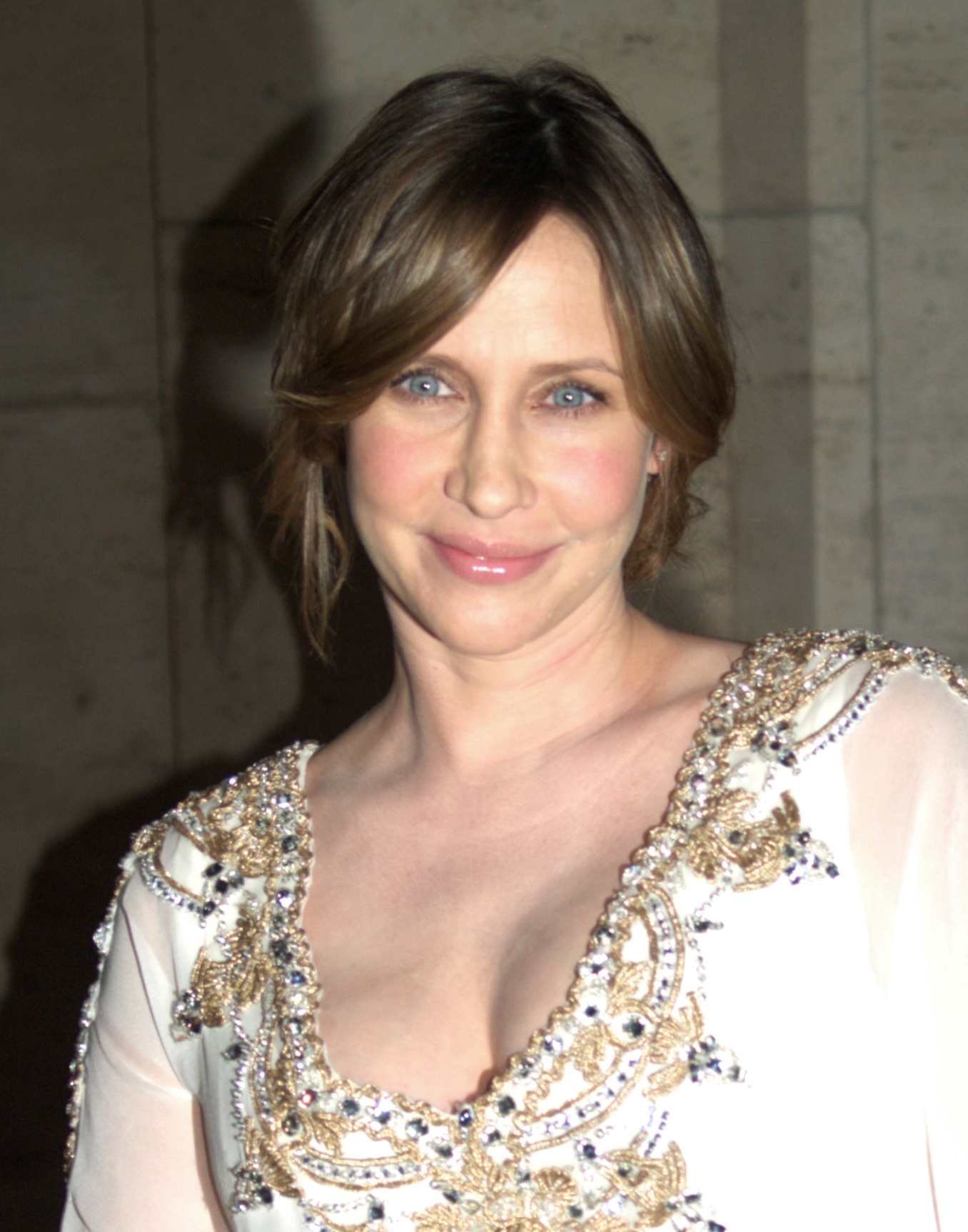
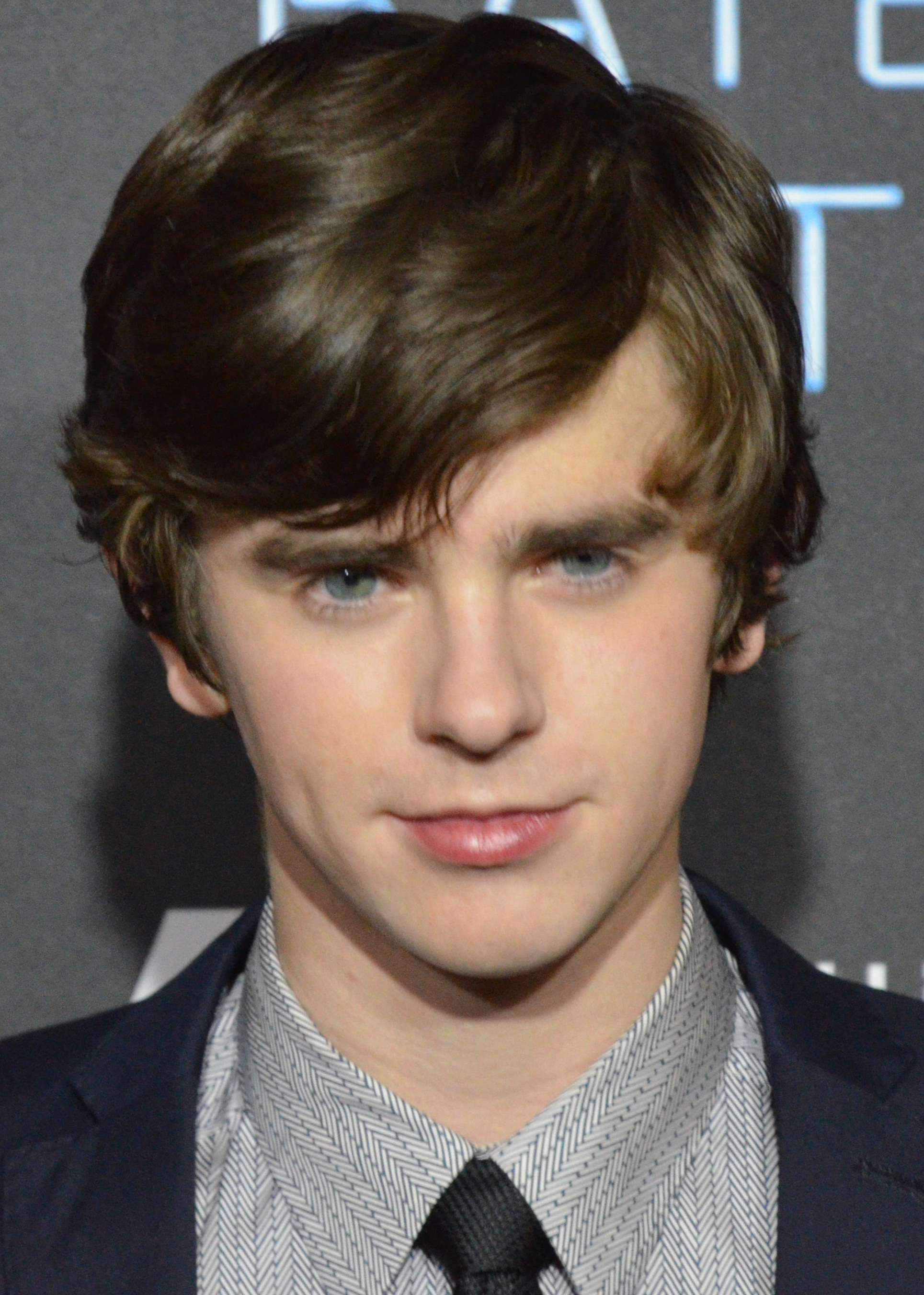
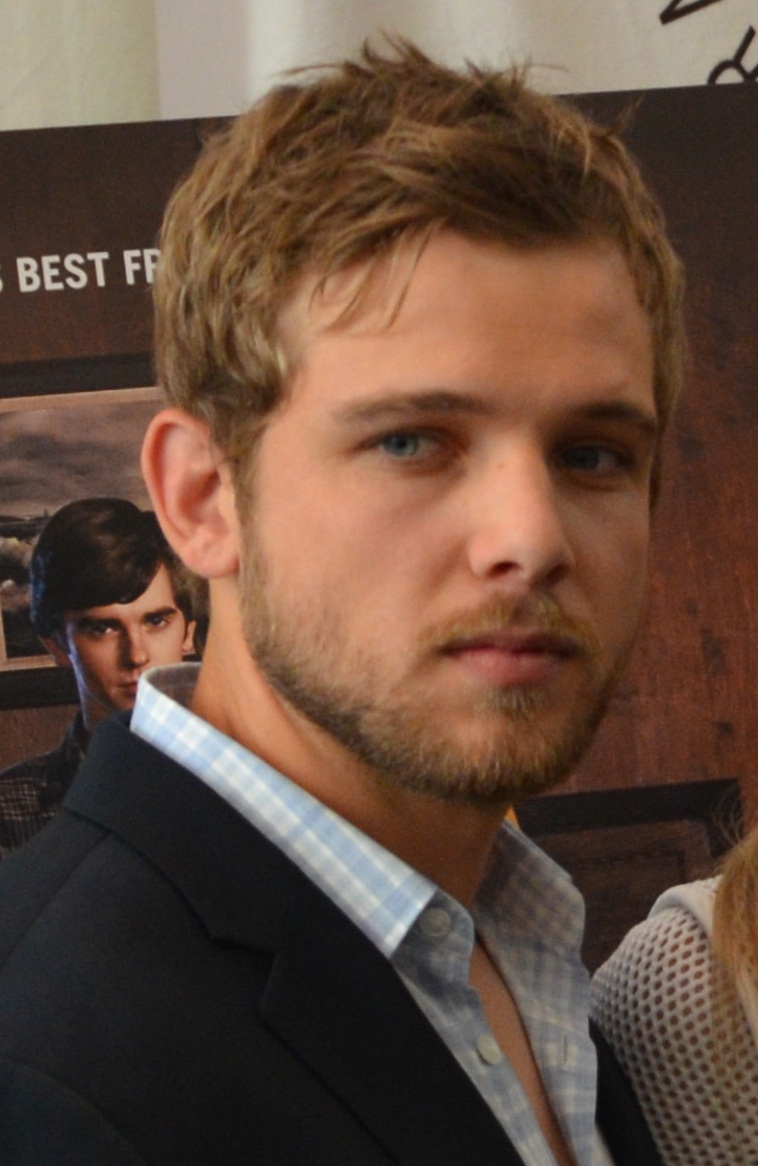
Vera Farmiga, Freddie Highmore, and Max Thieriot (left to right) portray leading roles Norma Louise Bates, Norman Bates, and Dylan Massett, respectively, who appear in all episodes.
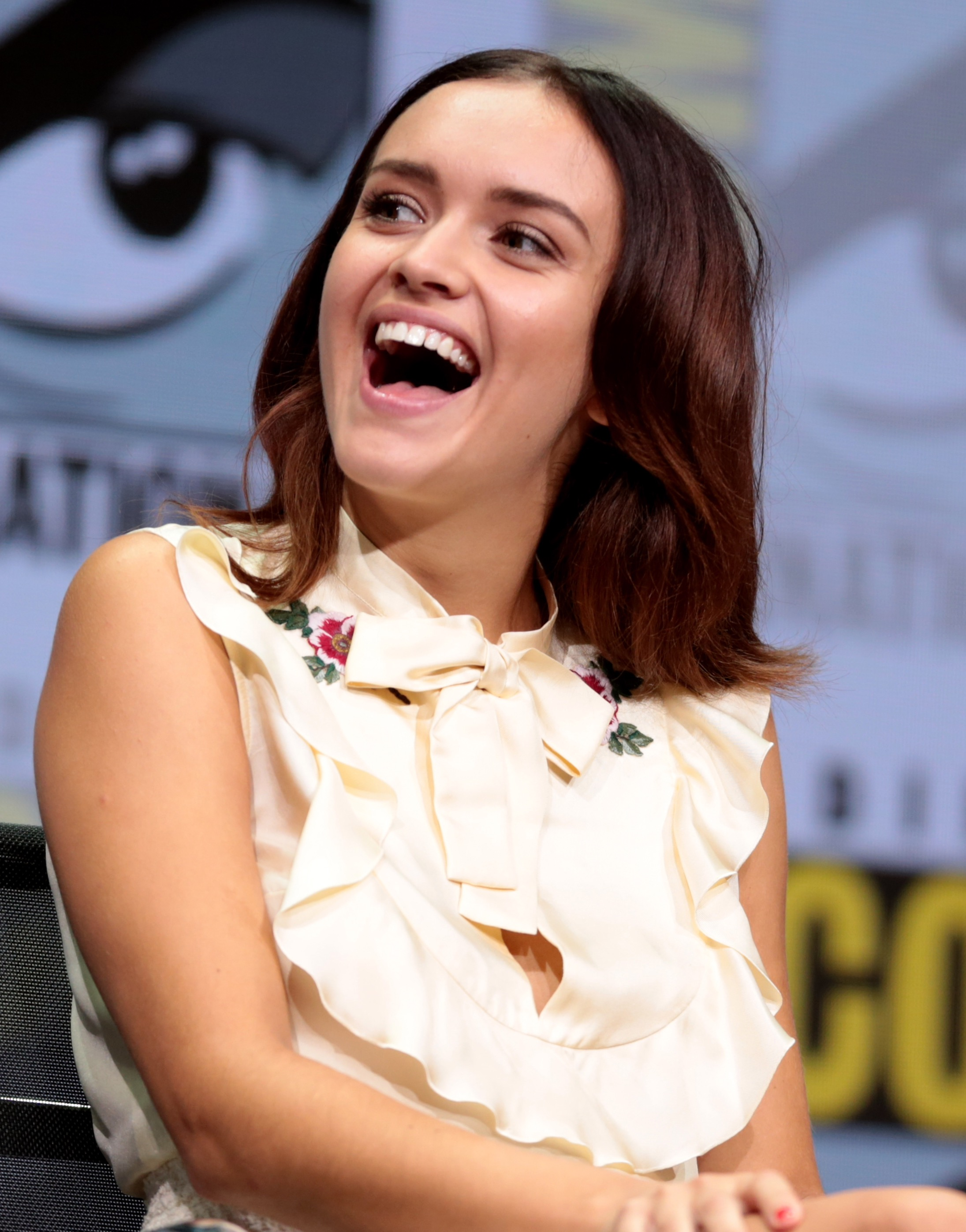
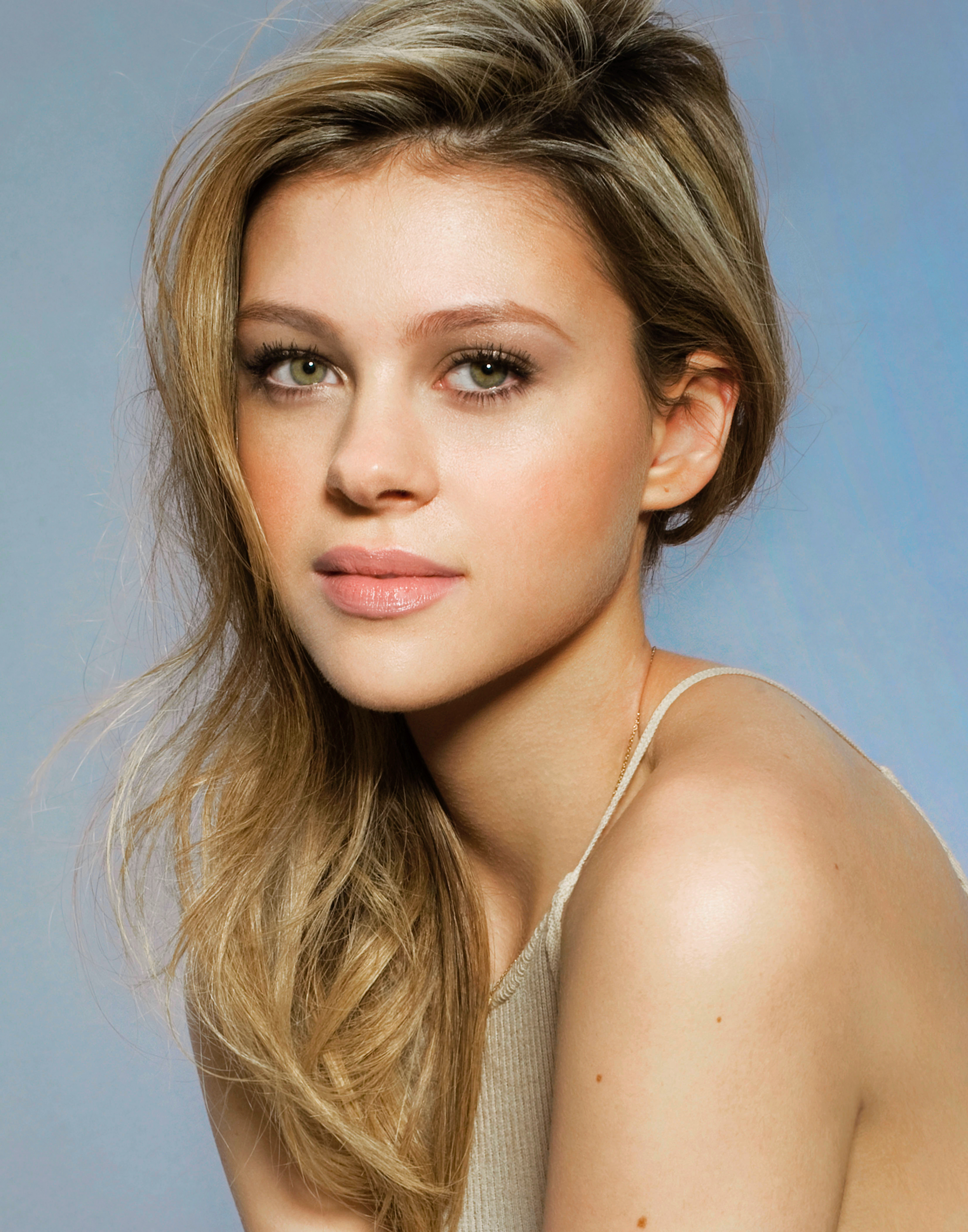
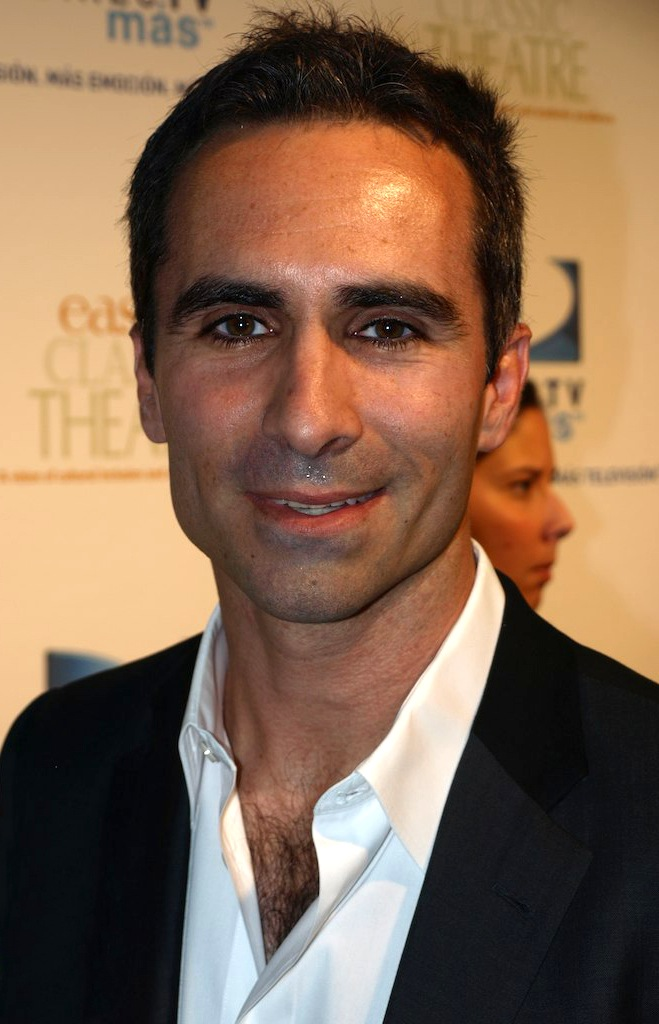
Olivia Cooke, Nicola Peltz, and Nestor Carbonell (left to right) portray Emma Decody, Bradley Martin, and Sheriff Alex Romero, respectively.
- Vera Farmiga as Norma Louise Bates
- Freddie Highmore as Norman Bates
- Max Thieriot as Dylan Massett
- Olivia Cooke as Emma Decody
- Nicola Peltz as Bradley Martin
- Nestor Carbonell as Sheriff Alex Romero

=== Recurring ===
- Michael O'Neill as Nick Ford
- Michael Eklund as Zane Morgan
- Ian Tracey as Remo Wallace
- Paloma Kwiatkowski as Cody Brennan
- Michael Vartan as George Heldens
- Rebecca Creskoff as Christine Heldens
- Kathleen Robertson as Jodi Morgan
- Keenan Tracey as Gunner
- Kenny Johnson as Caleb Calhoun
- Matthew Mandzij as Deputy Jeffcoat
- Michael Rogers as Jimmy Brennan
- Francis X. McCarthy as Declan Rogers
- Agam Darshi as Deputy Patty Lin
- Aliyah O'Brien as Regina

=== Guest ===
- Robert Moloney as Lee Berman
- Vincent Gale as Gil Turner
- Gillian Barber as Dr. Helen Ginsberg
- Richard Harmon as Richard Sylmore
- Lini Evans as Amelia Martin
- Brendan Fletcher as Kyle Miller
- Veena Sood as Dr. Elizabeth J. Schaefer
- Sarah Grey as Young Norma
- Andrew Airlie as Mayor Rob Woodriff
- John Cassini as Max Borowitz
- Keegan Connor Tracy as Miss Blaire Watson

== Production ==
=== Casting ===
For the second season, Nestor Carbonell, who recurred as Sheriff Alex Romero throughout the first season, was upgraded to a series regular. Beginning in July 2013, Michael Vartan was cast in the recurring role of George Heldens, a 40-something divorcée and love interest for Norma. Kenny Johnson joined the recurring cast as Norma's estranged brother Caleb Calhoun, and Rebecca Creskoff was cast as Christine Heldens, a White Pine Bay society woman and George's sister, who befriends Norma. Michael Eklund was cast as Zane Morgan, an upper level player in the drug business. In August, Kathleen Robertson was cast to recur as Jodi Morgan, Zane's sister, first described as "a smart, sexy businesswoman". Michael O'Neill joined the cast as Nick Ford, the season's major villain.

=== Filming ===
At the beginning of the first season, a replica of the original Bates Motel set from the film Psycho was built on location in Aldergrove, British Columbia on 272nd Street, where the series is filmed. Principal photography for the second season began on July 24, 2013. Production at the series' Aldergrove set concluded on November 6, with only location filming left to be completed for the season. During an interview in March 2014, Highmore and Thieriot revealed that the fight scene between Norman and Dylan left both actors in need of medical attention: "I cut my nose. It was nothing, really. Just a little blood", according to Highmore, "but it was real blood, not the fake stuff they put on us. Freddie and I just laughed about it", as Thieriot explained.

== Episodes ==
No. overall	No. in season	Title	Directed by	Written by	Original release date	US viewers (millions)
11	1	"Gone But Not Forgotten"	Tucker Gates	Carlton Cuse & Kerry Ehrin	March 3, 2014	3.07
The Bates family attends Miss Watson's funeral, after which a depressed Bradley attempts suicide. Four months later, the Bates Motel has become a hot spot for vacationers. Norma is worried about Norman, who spends his time practicing taxidermy and obsessing over Miss Watson and her unsolved murder, including frequent visits to her grave. On a visit to the graveyard, Norman sees an older man at the grave and takes a photo of him, assuming he could be Miss Watson's killer. He shows the photo to Sheriff Romero, who takes the opportunity to ask Norman about his whereabouts on the night of her killing. When Norman offers to email him the photo, he shows no interest. The success of the motel is in jeopardy when construction of a new highway bypass begins. Dylan learns that Bradley's father was cheating with Miss Watson, and that Gil, her boyfriend, likely killed him when he discovered their affair. Dylan tells this to Bradley, who then murders Gil and sneaks into Norman's house, asking for his help.
12	2	"Shadow of a Doubt"	Tucker Gates	Kerry Ehrin	March 10, 2014	2.22
Norman hides Bradley in the basement of the house, where she confesses to Gil's murder. Meanwhile, Romero meets the older man at the graveyard. He turns out to be Nick Ford, Miss Watson's father and the head of a family who controls the marijuana trade in White Pine Bay. Ford assures Romero that his family has nothing to do with Gil's murder. Zane Morgan, Dylan's new drug boss, suspects an opposing drug family in a nearby town of having killed Gil. A stoner named Kyle Miller is arrested after his semen is found inside Miss Watson, but another unidentified semen sample is also found. To bond with Norman, Norma signs them both up for the community musical. A problem arises when, at the same time Norman is supposed to be driving Bradley to a bus stop for her to flee town, he now has to be at a rehearsal. Norman therefore has Dylan take her instead. Meanwhile, Norma's brother, Caleb, arrives in town looking for the motel.
13	3	"Caleb"	Lodge Kerrigan	Alexandra Cunningham	March 17, 2014	1.85
Emma shows Norman a newspaper stating the police have discovered clothes and a suicide note belonging to Bradley, who is now presumed dead. Caleb arrives at the motel asking for Norma; he introduces himself to Dylan, who says Norma never mentioned she had a brother. Upon returning home, Norma immediately throws Caleb out. Meanwhile, Norma becomes friends with Christine, the former director of the community musical, and also meets Christine's brother, George. Norman makes a new girlfriend at the community theater, the troublemaking Cody Brennan. Caleb bonds with Dylan and says he helped protect Norma from their abusive father. Dylan then defends him to Norma, but she claims he repeatedly raped her for years during their childhood. The discussion escalates into a fight between Norman and Dylan, until Norma intervenes by ultimately revealing that Caleb is Dylan's biological father.
14	4	"Check-Out"	John David Coles	Liz Tigelaar	March 24, 2014	2.23
Norma's revelation deeply affects both herself and Dylan, who is found unconscious in his truck by Emma. Norma goes to Caleb's nearby motel in an attempt to speak to him, but cannot pluck up the courage to do so and emotionally drives away. Later, an angry Dylan accuses Norma of using his conception to get away from her family; marrying young to her high school boyfriend and making him think Dylan was his child. Dylan's assumption turns out to be correct. Meanwhile, Norman's imagining of his mother's rape by Caleb puts him in a blank trance and leads him to Caleb's motel room. His fractured psyche causes him to lash out at Caleb in Norma's persona. Caleb hits Norman and leaves his motel room. Cody picks up Norman, who finally comes out of his trance, but does not remember anything.
15	5	"The Escape Artist"	Christopher Nelson	Nikki Toscano	March 31, 2014	2.27
Norman admits to Cody about having had similar blackouts in the past. The next day, Norma meets Cody when she stops by to pick up Norman. Cody takes Norman to a treehouse, where the two have sex. Meanwhile, Romero takes up residence at the Bates Motel after Zane has his house burned down; he later finds Zane, beats him up and threatens to destroy his business. Emma confides in Norma about losing her virginity after she begins casually dating a motel guest, Gunner. Romero cautions Norma about Ford, whom she hopes will help stop the bypass initiative which, if green-lit, would negatively affect the motel. Later, Norma learns that one of the town council members has died in a mysterious auto accident. Dylan protects Zane from a drive-by shooting and ends up in the hospital, where he meets his new drug boss, Zane's sister Jodi.
16	6	"Plunge"	Ed Bianchi	Kerry Ehrin	April 7, 2014	2.24
Jodi takes Dylan to her house to help him recover from his injuries. After distancing herself from Ford, Norma is encouraged by Christine to meet with the mayor for the empty town council spot. Meanwhile, Cody invites Norman, Emma and Gunner to go swimming at the river, but Emma nearly drowns due to exposure after jumping into the cold water. Norman has another fit and blacks out while with Cody. Worried about Norman, Cody tells Emma about it, who then informs Norma. Just when Norman is about to take his driving test, Norma reveals to the instructor about Norman's physical blackouts. Angry, Norman confronts Cody for betraying his trust. Their heated discussion wakes her father Jimmy, who becomes abusive with her. As he scuffles with Jimmy, Norman pushes him down a flight of stairs to the basement, breaking his neck and killing him.
17	7	"Presumed Innocent"	Roxann Dawson	Alexandra Cunningham	April 14, 2014	2.44
Norma, now a town council member, is shown her office at the town hall and meets Councilman Max Borowitz. Romero arrives to inform Norma of Jimmy's death and takes her to the police station. Norman is questioned about the incident, and his DNA is taken for processing. Norma encounters Cody in the station's bathroom, and pleads that she not reveal to police that Norman suffers from blackouts. Cody, now an orphan, leaves for Indiana to live with her aunt. Before she goes, she tells Norman that Norma is hiding something from him and he must get answers from her. Norman is released from custody as Jimmy's death is ruled an accident, but Romero is later told that Norman's DNA matches the semen found earlier from Miss Watson's body. Zane raids Ford's warehouse, where Dylan is left unconscious for refusing to take part.
18	8	"Meltdown"	Ed Bianchi	Liz Tigelaar & Nikki Toscano	April 21, 2014	2.10
Romero becomes suspicious of Norman after finding out about his connection to Miss Watson. Norman begins to distance himself from Norma over her refusal to talk about his blackouts or mental state. Ford arrives at the motel to get Norma to arrange a meeting for him with Dylan; she informs him of their estrangement and he encourages her to get in contact. Ford visits the motel again and intimidates Norma, reminding her that she is indebted to him for getting her a seat on the town council. Dylan eventually meets with Nick, who suggests killing Zane or the Bates family will be in danger. Norman confronts Norma and yells that their relationship has changed and will never be the same. In retaliation, Norma leaves and has sex with George. Romero tells Norman that Kyle Miller has been convicted of murdering Miss Watson and tries to recover the truth of that night's events, but Norman flees. Afterward, Norman is abducted by an intruder.
19	9	"The Box"	Tucker Gates	Carlton Cuse & Kerry Ehrin	April 28, 2014	2.25
Norma returns home to find Norman missing. She checks the motel and encounters Emma, who is annoyed that she is always left out of the loop. Ford's henchmen keep Norman in a hot box in a field. Ford tells Norma he will let Norman go if Dylan kills Zane; if not, Norman dies. Trapped in a confined place, Norman's sanity slips, causing him to envision his mother saying she will protect him. He also recalls what happened during his blackout at Miss Watson's house: it is revealed he sliced Miss Watson's throat while having sex with her. Dylan, unable to kill Zane, reports to Ford. Fearing for his life, Dylan inadvertently kills Ford before he can learn of Norman's location. Meanwhile, Romero meets with a polygraphist about possibly performing a test on Norman. He informs Norma that her son had sex with Miss Watson on the night she died, before Norma tells him that Ford has kidnapped Norman.
20	10	"The Immutable Truth"	Tucker Gates	Carlton Cuse & Kerry Ehrin	May 5, 2014	2.30
Romero finds Ford dead and one of his henchmen emptying the safe. He convinces the man to reveal Norman's location, and Romero and Dylan find and rescue Norman. At the hospital, a weak Norman tells his mother about his "dream" of killing Miss Watson. She tells him to rest and not think about it or tell anyone. Romero insists on giving Norman a polygraph test. At home, Norman prepares a list of things he checks off after completing – packing up his taxidermy hobby, telling Emma about Norma's rape and Dylan's paternity, and dancing with his mother. Norman takes a gun and bullets from his mother's drawer. In the aftermath of Ford's death, Jodi – convinced by Romero – invites her brother Zane to her house to talk about the future of their business. They have an argument and Zane kills her, after which Romero comes in and shoots Zane dead. Romero gives Dylan a free pass and tells him how the story's going to be. Norma finds Norman wandering in the woods with a gun and she is able to talk him out of killing himself. Wanting to flee the country with her sons, she ultimately allows the polygraph, wherein Norman is asked if he killed Miss Watson. His mother's persona emerges again and he answers "no". Norman passes the polygraph with a knowing smile to himself.

== Reception ==
=== Critical response ===
The second season of Bates Motel received mostly positive reviews. It received 67 out of 100 from Metacritic, based on 11 television critic reviews, indicating "generally favorable" reviews. Review aggregator Rotten Tomatoes reported that 19 out of 21 critics gave the second season a positive review, averaging a 90% rating. The site's consensus reads, "Bates Motel reinvents a classic thriller with believable performances and distinguished writing". A&E renewed the series for a third season in April 2014 following the positive reviews and good ratings after the first five episodes.

=== Ratings ===
The season premiere episode drew in a total of 3.07 million viewers, with 1.3 million tuning in from the coveted 18–49 demographic. The season finale episode drew in 2.30 million viewers, with 0.9 million watching in the 18–49 demographic. Overall, the second season averaged 2.30 million viewers, with a 0.9 ratings share in the 18–49 demographic.

=== Awards and nominations ===
In its second season, Bates Motel was nominated for 16 awards, winning none.

Year	Awards	Category	Nominee(s)	Result	Ref.
2014	4th Critics' Choice Television Awards	Best Actor in a Drama Series	Freddie Highmore	Nominated	
2014	4th Critics' Choice Television Awards	Best Actress in a Drama Series	Vera Farmiga	Nominated	
2014	41st Saturn Awards	Best Actress on Television	Vera Farmiga	Nominated	
2014	41st Saturn Awards	Best Limited Run Television Series	Bates Motel	Nominated	
2014	18th Online Film & Television Association Awards	Best Drama Series	Bates Motel	Nominated	
2014	18th Online Film & Television Association Awards	Best Music in a Series	Chris Bacon	Nominated	
2014	18th Online Film & Television Association Awards	Best Production Design in a Series	Peter Bodnarus, Mark S. Freeborn, Tony Wohlgemuth, Margot Ready, Rose Marie McSherry	Nominated	
2014	18th Online Film & Television Association Awards	Best Sound in a Series	Alan Decker, Mark Noda, Nello Torri, Thomas DeGorter, Michael Mullane, Brian Armstrong	Nominated	
2014	18th Online Film & Television Association Awards	Best Actress in a Drama Series	Vera Farmiga	Nominated	
2014	Gold Derby Awards	Best Lead Actress in a Drama	Vera Farmiga	Nominated	
2014	16th Women's Image Network Awards	Best Actress – Drama Series	Vera Farmiga	Nominated	
2014	16th Women's Image Network Awards	Best Drama Series Produced by a Woman	Kerry Ehrin	Nominated	
2014	16th Women's Image Network Awards	Best Drama Series	Bates Motel	Nominated	
2014	TV Guide Awards	Favorite Horror Series	Bates Motel	Nominated	
2014	41st People's Choice Awards	Favorite Cable TV Drama	Bates Motel	Nominated	
2014	29th Imagen Awards	Best Supporting Actor – Television	Nestor Carbonell	Nominated	
The listed years are of television release, annual ceremonies are usually held the following year
