= Bates Motel season 1 =

Season of television series

Bates Motel
- Season 1
- Promotional poster and home media cover art
- Starring: Vera Farmiga; Freddie Highmore; Max Thieriot; Olivia Cooke; Nicola Peltz
- No. of episodes: 10

Release
- Original network: A&E
- Original release: March 18 – May 20, 2013

Season chronology
- Next → Season 2

The first season of Bates Motel aired from March 18 to May 20, 2013. The season consisted of 10 episodes and aired on A&E. The series is described as a "contemporary prequel" to the 1960 film Psycho and follows the life of Norman Bates and his mother Norma prior to the events portrayed in the Hitchcock film. The series takes place in the fictional town of White Pine Bay, Oregon.

The season received positive reviews from television critics. In its premiere episode, the series broke rating records for an original drama series on A&E, drawing in a total of 3.04 million viewers. Bates Motel was renewed for a second season after three episodes of the first season had aired. Vera Farmiga received particular praise for her performance as Norma Louise Bates, she won the 2013 Saturn Award for Best Actress on Television, and was nominated for the 2013 Primetime Emmy Award for Outstanding Lead Actress in a Drama Series, the 2013 Critics' Choice Television Award for Best Actress in a Drama Series, and the 2013 TCA Award for Individual Achievement in Drama. The first season was released on Blu-ray and DVD on September 17, 2013.

== Cast and characters ==
=== Main ===
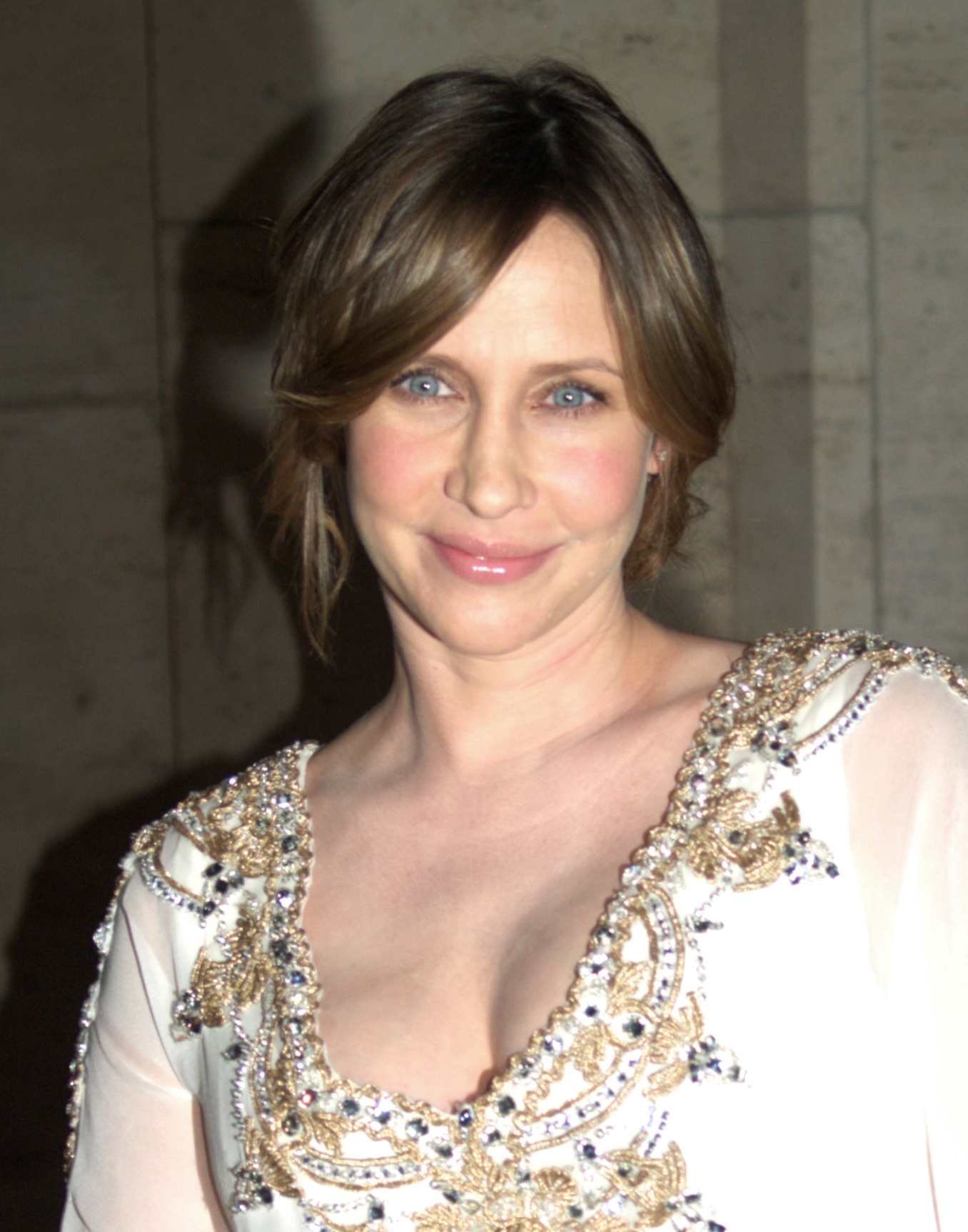
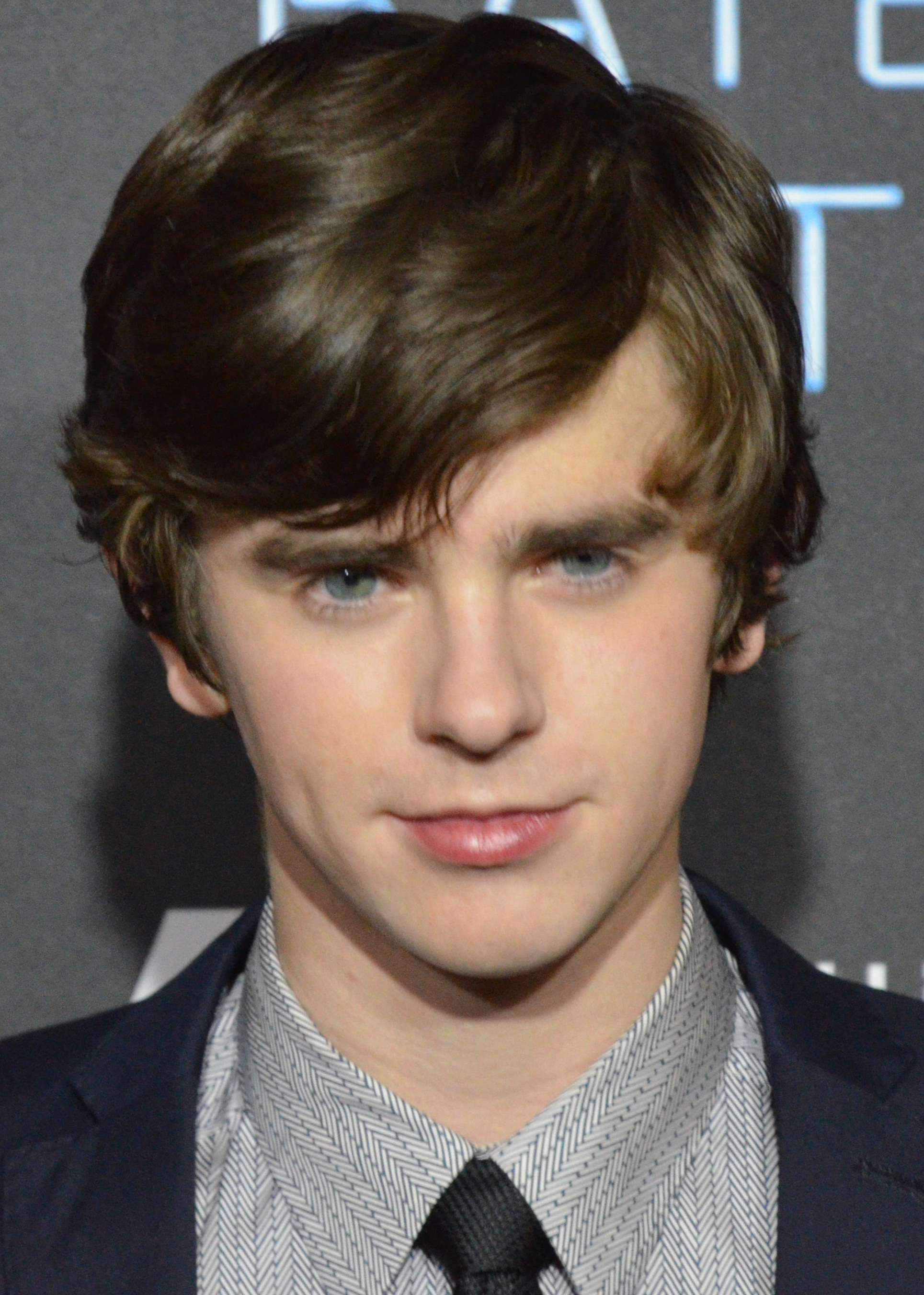
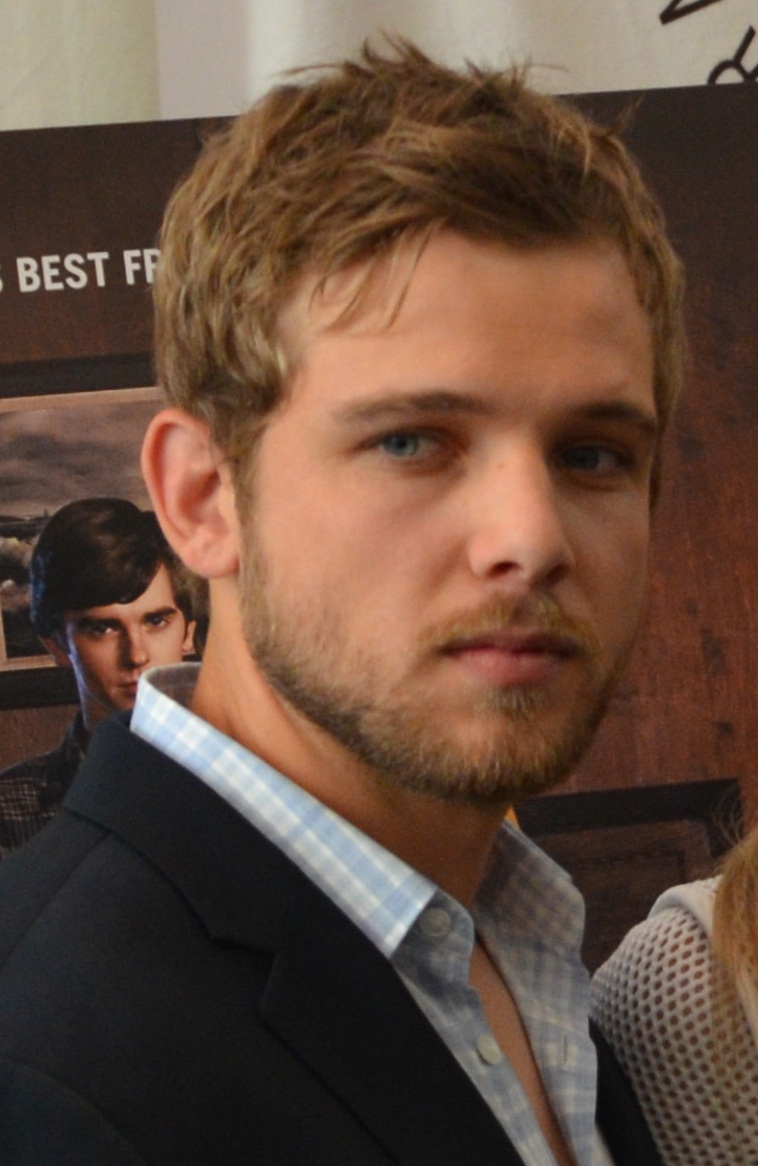
Vera Farmiga, Freddie Highmore, and Max Thieriot (left to right) portray leading roles Norma Louise Bates, Norman Bates, and Dylan Massett, respectively, who appear in all episodes.
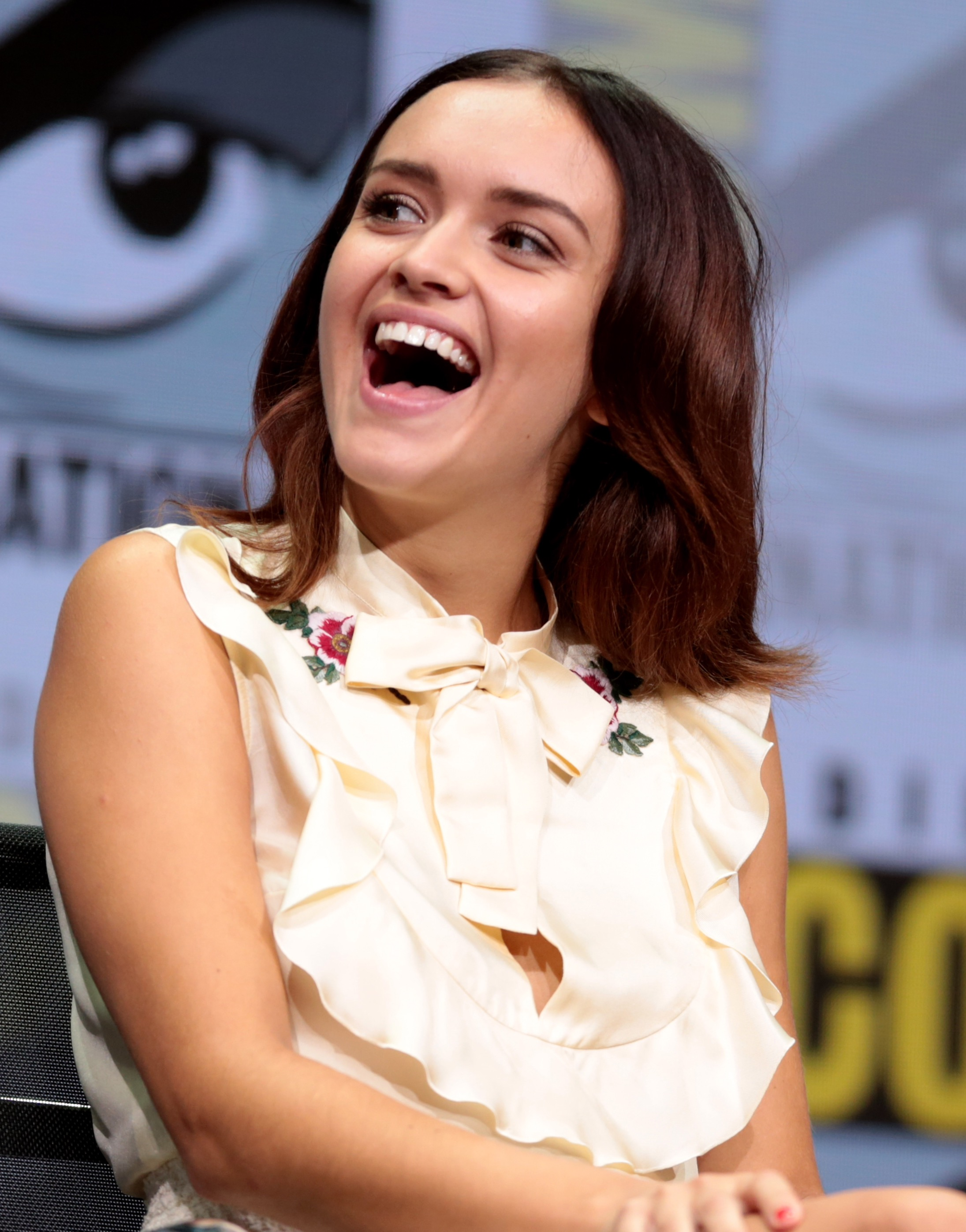
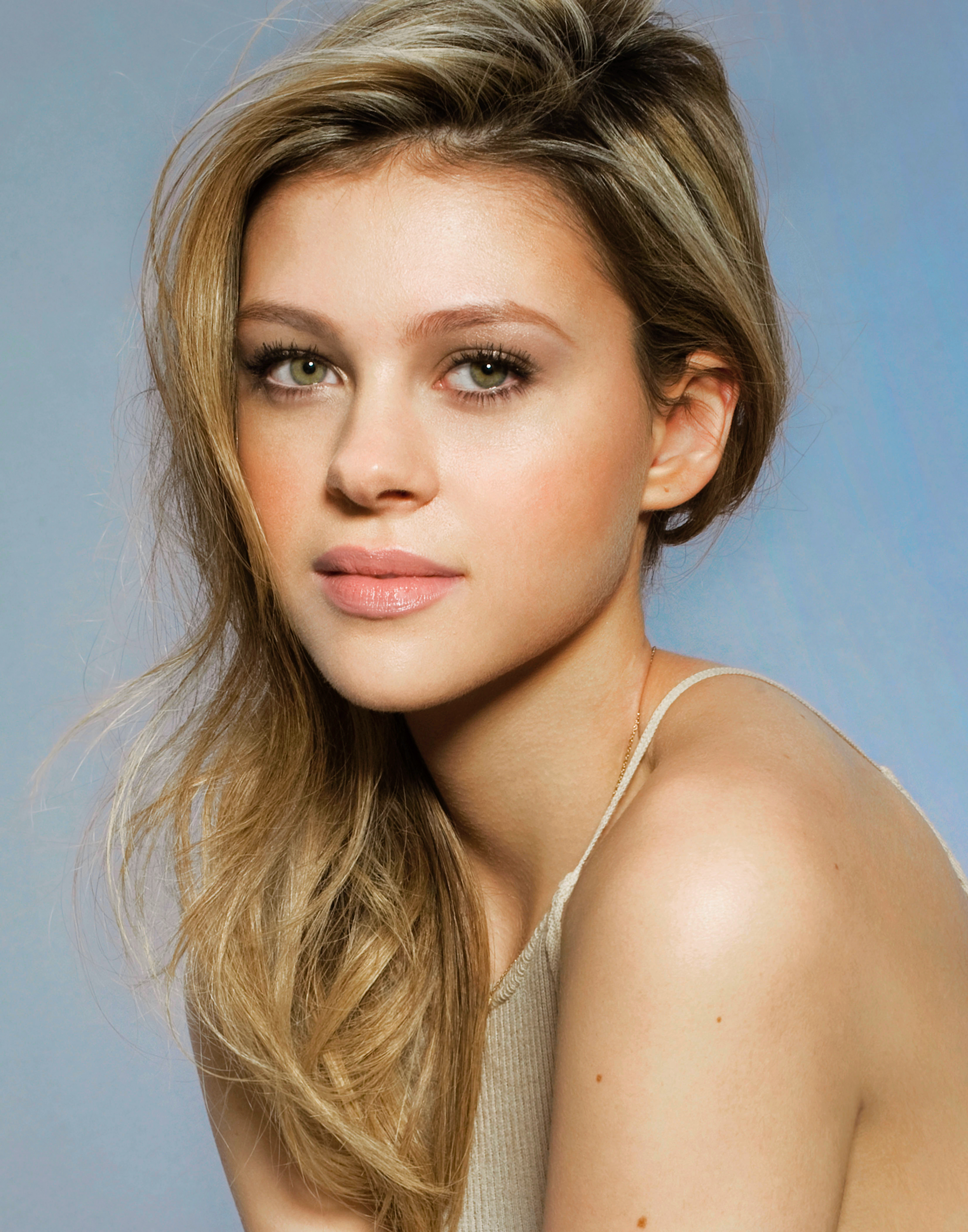
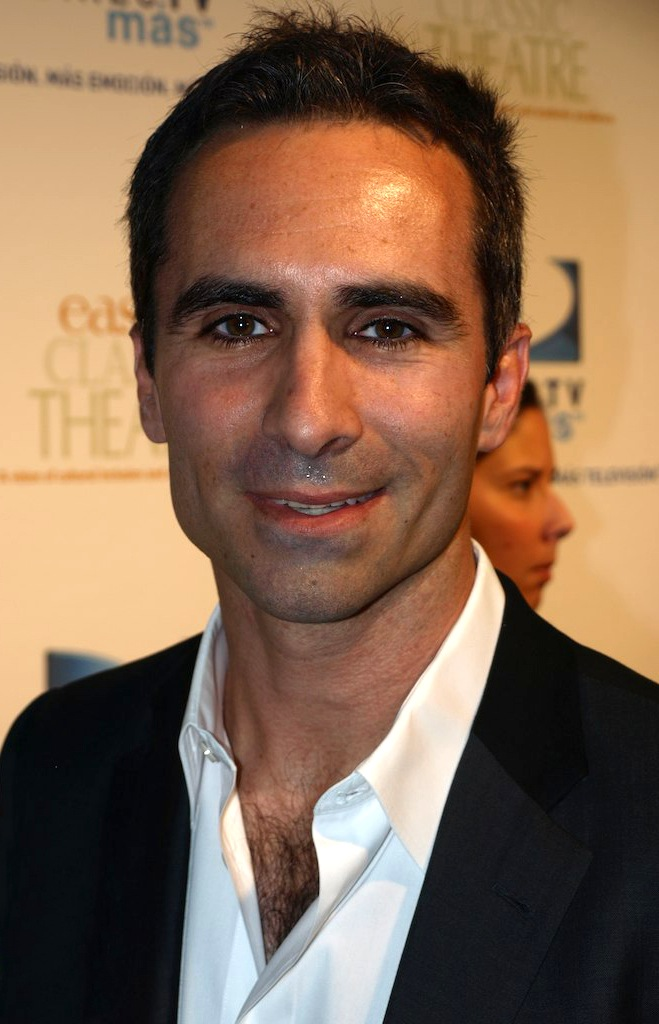
Olivia Cooke, Nicola Peltz, and Nestor Carbonell (left to right) portray Emma Decody, Bradley Martin, and Sheriff Alex Romero, respectively.
- Vera Farmiga as Norma Louise Bates
- Freddie Highmore as Norman Bates
- Max Thieriot as Dylan Massett
- Olivia Cooke as Emma Decody
- Nicola Peltz as Bradley Martin

=== Recurring ===
- Nestor Carbonell as Sheriff Alex Romero
- Mike Vogel as Deputy Zack Shelby
- Keegan Connor Tracy as Miss Blair Watson
- Brittney Wilson as Lissa
- Jere Burns as Jake Abernathy
- Diana Bang as Jiao
- Vincent Gale as Gil Turner
- Richard Harmon as Richard Sylmore
- Ian Tracey as Remo Wallace
- Terry Chen as Ethan Chang
- Ian Hart as Will Decody
- Hiro Kanagawa as Dr. Fumhiro Kurata
- David Cubitt as Sam Bates
- Keenan Tracey as Gunner
- Aliyah O'Brien as Regina

=== Guest ===
- W. Earl Brown as Keith Summers
- Lara Gilchrist as Rebecca Craig
- Ben Cotton as Danny

== Production ==
=== Casting ===
A&E gave Bates Motel a straight-to-series order in July 2012. Vera Farmiga was the first to be cast, as protagonist Norma Louise Bates in August. Shortly after, Freddie Highmore was cast as Norman Bates in September. The same month, Max Thieriot was cast as Norman's half brother, Dylan Massett. Nicola Peltz was cast as Bradley Martin. Olivia Cooke was the final main cast member to join the series, portraying Emma Decody.

=== Filming ===
A replica of the original Bates Motel set from the film Psycho was built on location in Aldergrove, British Columbia on 272nd Street, where the series is filmed. Production also took place in Greater Vancouver, and Richmond, British Columbia. Principal photography for the first season began on October 1, 2012. Though filming for the first season was expected to wrap on January 24, 2013, production continued into early February.

== Episodes ==
No. overall	No. in season	Title	Directed by	Written by	Original release date	US viewers (millions)
1	1	"First You Dream, Then You Die"	Tucker Gates	Story by : Carlton Cuse, Kerry Ehrin & Anthony Cipriano; Teleplay by : Kerry Ehrin & Anthony Cipriano	March 18, 2013	3.04
Widow Norma Louise Bates and her 17-year-old son, Norman, move from Arizona to the town of White Pine Bay, Oregon, where they buy a rundown motel six months after the sudden death of Norman's father Sam. Norma intends to reopen the motel in an attempt to build a new life. On his first day at his new high school, Norman befriends popular local girl, Bradley Martin, who takes him out for a night on the town with her friends. Norman also meets Miss Watson, his advanced English teacher. While Norman is out with Bradley for the evening, the motel's former owner, Keith Summers, breaks into the house and rapes Norma. Norman arrives back and knocks Keith out, before Norma murders him. The duo dump the body in the local harbor. That same night, Norma and Norman meet Sheriff Romero and Deputy Shelby, who show up to have a look around the motel for reasons unknown. In Room 4, Norman finds a sketchbook full of lurid drawings that show women being tortured. Similarly, a woman is seen drugged and chained somewhere, indicating that a sinister presence resides in the town. Norma renames the motel the Bates Motel.
2	2	"Nice Town You Picked, Norma..."	Tucker Gates	Kerry Ehrin	March 25, 2013	2.84
Tension arises when Dylan Massett, Norma's elder son from a different father than Norman, arrives in White Pine Bay to stay. Norman and Bradley witness her father get badly burned in a car accident. Meanwhile, Norman and his cystic fibrosis-stricken classmate, Emma Decody, look into the mystery of the sketchbook. Shelby suggests to Norma that the town's wealth is earned through illegal means, and that the whole town council and police force is in on a massive conspiracy. Norma sees a body hanging upside-down and on fire in the middle of town, witnessed by townspeople, showing "justice" is often resolved extrajudicially. Emma and Norman stumble upon a huge marijuana field hidden in the nearby forest and are chased away by two armed men, barely escaping.
3	3	"What's Wrong with Norman"	Paul A. Edwards	Jeff Wadlow	April 1, 2013	2.82
Norman passes out at school and is taken to the hospital. Norma is asked if he has experienced an episode like this before, to which she says no. Dylan states he has a new job, not mentioning it is guarding the marijuana field with his new partner, Ethan. Norma discharges Norman from the hospital, who tells her that he kept Keith's utility belt, which is now missing after the police carried out a property search. Dylan tells Norman to get out more and not let Norma smother him. Meanwhile, Shelby reveals to Norma that he took Keith's belt without Romero's knowledge, because he wants to protect her from being investigated for the disappearance; the two then kiss. Norman envisions his mother telling him to get the belt back; he then breaks into Shelby's house to retrieve it, but instead discovers that one of the women from the sketchbook is being held captive in Shelby's basement.
4	4	"Trust Me"	Johan Renck	Kerry Ehrin	April 8, 2013	2.30
Shelby arrives home while Norman is still inside. Dylan, who had followed Norman to the house, distracts Shelby to give Norman enough time to escape. Norma tells Norman he sometimes sees and hears things that aren't real. With Emma unreachable, Norman draws more closely to Bradley, who is mourning the death of her father. Meanwhile, Romero finds a decomposing hand in the bay that has Keith's wristwatch attached to it. That same evening, Norman meets with Bradley at her house, and the two of them end up sleeping together for the first time; when Norma finds out, she becomes upset. Dylan confronts Norma, stating he knows what she has done, which gives him the right to take Norman to stay with him. Just then, the police show up and arrest Norma for Keith's murder.
5	5	"Ocean View"	David Straiton	Jeff Wadlow	April 15, 2013	2.66
Norman posts bail for his mother and she is released the next day. Dylan proposes that Norman should live with him instead. Shelby gets rid of the evidence incriminating Norma, claiming to be in love with her. Meanwhile, Dylan borrows $5,000 from Ethan, his work partner, so he can buy his own house. Afterward, a drug addict appears and shoots Ethan, and Dylan rushes him to the hospital. Dylan later runs the drug addict over with his car. At dinner, Norman reveals to Emma that the girl from the sketchbook is real, and the two later find her in Keith's abandoned boat. They take the girl, named Jiao, back to the motel and show her to Norma. She then identifies Shelby as the man who had been assaulting her, shocking and horrifying Norma.
6	6	"The Truth"	Tucker Gates	Carlton Cuse & Kerry Ehrin	April 22, 2013	2.93
Norman and Dylan find Keith's utility belt and throw it in the harbor in order to protect their mother. Dylan's boss, Gil, informs him that Ethan has died of his wounds. Dylan says that he took out his partner's killer as payback, which pleases Gil. He is then introduced to his new partner, Remo. Shelby finds out that Jiao is staying at the motel and she subsequently flees. He then holds the Bates family at gunpoint and assaults Norma, causing Norman to angrily attack him. After a shootout commences, Dylan kills Shelby to save his family. Meanwhile, Norma reveals the truth about Sam Bates's death to Dylan: Norman killed him in a fit of rage after seeing his father beating Norma and has absolutely no recollection of it, believing his father's death was an accident. She tells Dylan that Norman needs to be protected.
7	7	"The Man in Number 9"	S. J. Clarkson	Kerry Ehrin	April 29, 2013	2.99
Romero arrives at the scene but makes up a story that he caught and killed Shelby in a gun fight. Meanwhile, Dylan meets Jake Abernathy, who checks into the motel, as he had Room 9 reserved for a week every two months before Keith sold the motel. Norma hires Emma to work at the motel as a cleaner. Norman grows close to a stray dog, whom he names Juno. Norman heads to Bradley's house to declare his love for her, only for Bradley to tell him they are not meant for each other. Norman witnesses Juno being hit and killed by a car, and is devastated.
8	8	"A Boy and His Dog"	Ed Bianchi	Bill Balas	May 6, 2013	2.71
Emma's father, Will, teaches Norman taxidermy after Norman takes his dead dog to him. Upon the school principal's request, Norma has Norman meet with a psychologist, who suggests Norma may have control issues over her son. Meanwhile, Jake reveals to Norma that he knows the full story about Shelby and Keith's sex-slave business. Norma kicks Jake out in retaliation. Dylan brings "trimmers" to stay at the motel. Norma decides to take Dylan out to dinner to thank him for bringing new customers, but is horrified to see the autopsied corpse of Shelby on her bed.
9	9	"Underwater"	Tucker Gates	Carlton Cuse & Kerry Ehrin	May 13, 2013	2.48
Norma receives a threatening note and decides to put the motel up for sale. She enlists Romero to help track down Jake, but he informs her he cannot find anything on the man. To calm her, Romero has the house patrolled on the half-hour. Dylan helps Bradley get access to her father's office, where she finds love letters exchanged between her dad and someone known as "B". Meanwhile, Emma gets to know a "trimmer" named Gunner and experiences her first high. Norma's realtor tells her that her property won't go up for sale, angering her to the point of beating him with her bag. Afterward, Norma finds Jake in her car with a pistol; he reveals that Shelby owed him $150,000 from the sex-slave business and, thinking she has the cash, threatens to kill her and her sons unless she delivers the money to him the following night. Terrified, Norma agrees.
10	10	"Midnight"	Tucker Gates	Carlton Cuse & Kerry Ehrin	May 20, 2013	2.70
Romero tells Norma that he'll help her with the Jake situation. Norma reveals to Norman a secret: her brother began raping her when she was 13. Norman and Emma decide to go to the school winter dance as friends. At the dance, Norman repeatedly eyes Bradley, causing a heartbroken Emma to storm out and Bradley's jealous boyfriend to punch Norman. Miss Watson offers to tend to Norman's injured eye and takes him back to her place. Meanwhile, Norma witnesses Romero shoot and kill Jake. At Miss Watson's home, Norman observes his teacher stripping off to change. A hallucination of Norma convinces Norman that Miss Watson is seducing him. Norman rushes home and tells Norma that Miss Watson was going to drive him, but the next thing he remembers is running home. Miss Watson's corpse is shown with her throat slashed, wearing a "B" necklace, hinting that she may be the secret lover of Bradley's father.

== Reception ==
=== Critical response ===
The first season of Bates Motel received mostly positive reviews. It received 66 out of 100 from Metacritic, based on 34 critical responses, indicating "generally favorable" reviews. Rotten Tomatoes aggregated that 81% of 37 television critics gave the series a positive review. The site's consensus reads, "Bates Motel utilizes mind manipulation and suspenseful fear tactics, on top of consistently sharp character work and wonderfully uncomfortable familial relationships". A&E renewed the series for a second season following the positive reviews and good ratings after the first three episodes.

=== Ratings ===
On its premiere night, the series broke rating records for an original drama series on A&E. It drew in a strong 3.04 million viewers total, including 1.6 million viewers watching it in the 18-49 demographic. The season finale episode drew in a total of 2.70 million viewers, with a 1.2 ratings share in the 18–49 demo. Overall, the first season averaged 2.70 million viewers, with 1.5 million tuning in from both the 18–49 and 25–54 demographics.

=== Awards and nominations ===
In its first season, Bates Motel was nominated for 24 awards, winning one.

Year	Awards	Category	Nominee(s)	Result	Ref.
2013	3rd Critics' Choice Television Awards	Best Actress in a Drama Series	Vera Farmiga	Nominated	
2013	29th Television Critics Association Awards	Individual Achievement in Drama	Vera Farmiga	Nominated	
2013	65th Primetime Emmy Awards	Outstanding Lead Actress in a Drama Series	Vera Farmiga	Nominated	
2013	17th Online Film & Television Association Awards	Best Actress in a Drama Series	Vera Farmiga	Nominated	
2013	17th Online Film & Television Association Awards	Best Cinematography in a Series	John S. Bartley, Thomas Yatsko	Nominated	
2013	17th Online Film & Television Association Awards	Best Production Design in a Series	Peter Bodnarus, Mark S. Freeborn, Margot Ready, Rose Marie McSherry	Nominated	
2013	28th Imagen Awards	Best Supporting Actor – Television	Nestor Carbonell	Nominated	
2013	29th Artios Awards	Outstanding Achievement in Casting	April Webster, Sara Isaacson, Jennifer Page, Corinne Clark	Nominated	
2013	Make-Up Artists & Hair Stylists Guild Awards	Best Contemporary Hairstyling – Television and New Media Series	Donna Bis	Nominated	
2013	15th Women's Image Network Awards	Best Drama Series	Bates Motel	Nominated	
2013	15th Women's Image Network Awards	Best Actress – Drama Series	Vera Farmiga	Nominated	
2013	5th Dorian Awards	TV Performance of the Year – Actress	Vera Farmiga	Nominated	
2013	Gold Derby Awards	Best Lead Actress in a Drama	Vera Farmiga	Nominated	
2013	Gold Derby Awards	Breakthrough Performer of the Year	Freddie Highmore	Nominated	
2013	40th People's Choice Awards	Favorite TV Anti-Hero	Freddie Highmore	Nominated	
2013	18th Satellite Awards	Best Actor – Television Series Drama	Freddie Highmore	Nominated	
2013	18th Satellite Awards	Best Actress – Television Series Drama	Vera Farmiga	Nominated	
2013	ACTRA Awards	Best Actor	Vincent Gale	Nominated	
2013	IGN Awards	Best New TV Series	Bates Motel	Nominated	
2013	IGN Awards	Best TV Horror Series	Bates Motel	Nominated	
2013	IGN Awards	Best TV Actress	Vera Farmiga	Nominated	
2013	40th Saturn Awards	Best Actress on Television	Vera Farmiga	Won	
2013	40th Saturn Awards	Best Actor on Television	Freddie Highmore	Nominated	
2013	40th Saturn Awards	Best Television Presentation	Bates Motel	Nominated	
The listed years are of television release, annual ceremonies are usually held the following year
