= Bill Balas =

American screenwriter, director and producer (1974–2025)

William Balas (February 19, 1974 – April 16, 2025) was an American screenwriter, film director and television producer best known for his work on the A&E series Bates Motel and the TNT series Animal Kingdom.

== Background ==
Born and raised in Cleveland, Ohio, Balas graduated from the American Film Institute, where he earned a MFA in Screenwriting. Prior to moving to Los Angeles, California, he was diagnosed with cystic fibrosis as an infant and underwent a successful double-lung transplant in his early twenties. Balas died at his home on April 16, 2025, at the age of 51.

== Awards ==
Writers Guild of America, West

- 2015 Writer Access Project Honoree (Affliction)

Slamdance Film Festival

- 2010 Teleplay Competition: Original Pilot Winner (Murphy's Last Stand)

American Screenwriting Competition

- 2006 Grand Prize Winner (The Pros and Cons of Breathing)

International Student Film Festival Hollywood

- 2006 Best Horror/Thriller Winner (House of the Rising Sun)

Alfred P. Sloan Foundation

- 2005 Production Award Winner (The Pros and Cons of Breathing)
