= Olivia Cooke =

British actress (born 1993)

- Cooke in 2026
- Born: Olivia Kate Cooke; 27 December 1993 (age 32); Oldham, England
- Occupation: Actress
- Years active: 2012–present

Olivia Kate Cooke (born 27 December 1993) is an English actress. She has appeared as Alicent Hightower in the fantasy drama television series House of the Dragon (2022–present), Emma Decody in the thriller Bates Motel (2013–2017), Becky Sharp in the period drama Vanity Fair (2018), spy Sidonie "Sid" Baker in the Apple TV thriller Slow Horses (2022–present), and Cherry Laine in the psychological thriller The Girlfriend (2025).

In film, Cooke has starred in the horror film Ouija (2014), the comedy-drama film Me and Earl and the Dying Girl (2015), the thriller Thoroughbreds (2017), the science fiction film Ready Player One (2018), the comedy thriller Pixie (2020), the drama Sound of Metal (2019), and the thriller A Talent for Murder (2026).

== Early life and education ==
Olivia Kate Cooke was born on 27 December 1993 in Oldham, Greater Manchester, England to sales representative Lindsay Wilde and police officer John Cooke. Her parents divorced when she was a child, and she and her sister lived with their mother.

She started acting when she was eight years old at the Oldham Theatre Workshop, an after-school drama programme in her hometown. She attended Royton and Crompton Academy. When she was 14, she secured her first local agent, who gained her commercial roles. She then studied drama at Oldham Sixth Form College, but left school before the end of her A-levels to appear in the drama series Blackout.

She starred as Maria in a college production of West Side Story, and soon landed her first and last leading role for the Oldham Theatre Workshop in Prom: The Musical, a remake of Cinderella. In 2012, she appeared in One Direction's "Autumn Term" tour video as a student getting a piggyback ride from Harry Styles.

Although her agent discouraged her from enrolling in drama school because she was already getting acting work, she was keen on applying to the Royal Academy of Dramatic Art (RADA) and made it to the final round of auditions, but was not accepted.

== Career ==
=== 2012–2014: Early roles ===
After Cooke performed at the Oldham Theatre Workshop, Beverley Keogh, a casting director next door to her agency, secured her roles in television. Cooke starred in all three BBC mini-series productions in 2012: Blackout, as the daughter of Christopher Eccleston's character, and The Secret of Crickley Hall, as a young teacher at a tyrannical orphanage in the 1940s. Cooke stated that she felt better suited for television than theatre, as she was embarrassed by the exaggerated gestures sometimes required for stage acting. Despite being a novice, Cooke distinguished herself among European actresses in the gruelling casting process for The Quiet Ones, which opened in April 2014, two years after filming took place.

In 2012, following The Quiet Ones, Cooke acquired an agent in Los Angeles. After reading the character descriptions for A&E's contemporary Psycho prequel Bates Motel, she sent an audition tape for the role of Emma Decody. Three weeks later, Cooke earned the part of Emma, her first American role. She was originally disappointed when the producers made Emma Mancunian, believing it was a fail-safe measure regarding her accent. However, aided by fellow English actor Freddie Highmore, who has previous experience with an American accent, Cooke has since been mistaken to be American. Cooke also contributed short videos for Emma's fictitious blog.

Cooke's second feature film The Signal, with Brenton Thwaites and Laurence Fishburne, opened at the 2014 Sundance Film Festival. Cooke starred as Haley Peterson, an American MIT student transferring to Caltech, who encounters strange occurrences as she, her boyfriend, and her best friend are lured into the desert by a hacker. In October 2014, Cooke led the cast of Ouija, a horror film based on Hasbro's board game. The role of the protagonist, Laine Morris, was a major undertaking for Cooke, who appeared in almost every scene. The story centred on a group of friends who use the Ouija board to contact a deceased friend, but end up awakening a dark presence. Despite being panned by critics, Ouija was a box office success, grossing approximately $102.5 million worldwide.

=== 2015–2019: Breakthrough ===
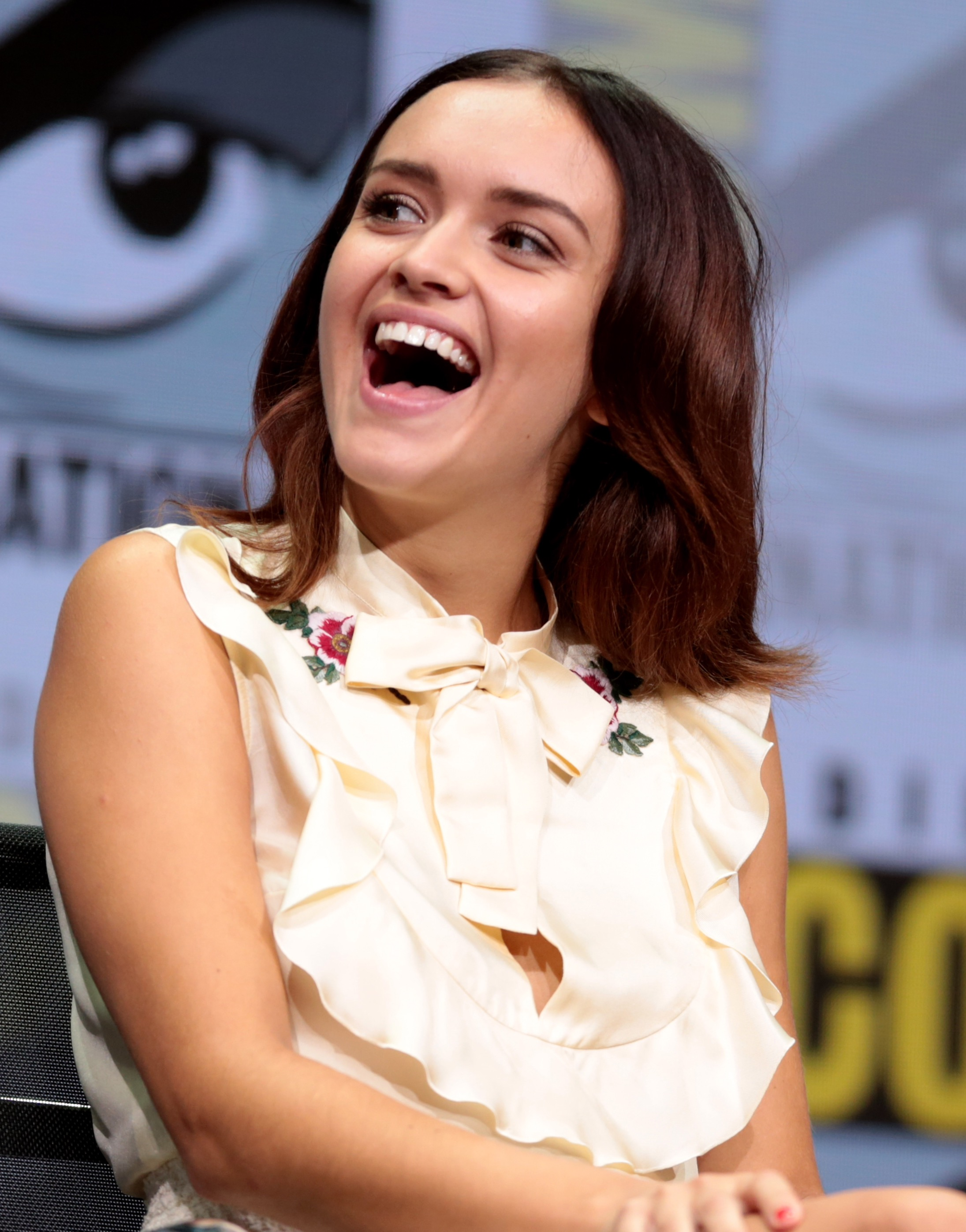
Cooke at the 2017 San Diego Comic-Con

Cooke next appeared in the comedy-drama film Me and Earl and the Dying Girl. For the coming-of-age tale by Jesse Andrews, who adapted the original novel for the film, Cooke shaved off her hair to play the female lead who battles leukaemia. The film premiered at the Sundance Film Festival, where it was awarded both the Grand Jury and Audience Awards. Also in 2015, Cooke voiced the Loch Ness Monster for an episode of Axe Cop, which was co-written by her Me and Earl and the Dying Girl co-star Nick Offerman.

Cooke played the titular character in the independent drama film Katie Says Goodbye, alongside Jim Belushi, Mireille Enos, Christopher Abbott, and Mary Steenburgen. The film revolves around Katie, a 17-year-old waitress attempting to overcome poverty and start a new life in San Francisco by resorting to prostitution. She next starred in the film adaptation of Dan Leno and the Limehouse Golem, a gothic murder mystery, opposite Bill Nighy and Douglas Booth. Both films premiered at the 2016 Toronto International Film Festival. Cooke then starred in the thriller film Thoroughbreds, alongside Anya Taylor-Joy and Anton Yelchin, which premiered at the 2017 Sundance Film Festival.

Cooke starred as Art3mis in Steven Spielberg's science fiction adventure Ready Player One, which was released in March 2018. Later that year, she appeared alongside Oscar Isaac, Olivia Wilde and Samuel L. Jackson in Dan Fogelman's relationship drama film Life Itself, and played the lead character, Becky Sharp in the ITV production of Vanity Fair.

Cooke starred in the drama film Sound of Metal, alongside Riz Ahmed. The film premiered at the 2019 Toronto International Film Festival on 6 September 2019. Also in 2019, she appeared as Karla, pregnant homeless woman giving her baby up for adoption, in the Amazon Prime Video romantic comedy anthology series Modern Love.

=== 2020–present: Streaming projects ===
In 2020, Cooke starred in and executive produced the independent sci-fi romantic drama film Little Fish, alongside Jack O'Connell. Since 2022, Cooke has played the role of Alicent Hightower in HBO's House of the Dragon. In the Apple TV+ series Slow Horses, Cooke appeared as MI5 agent Sidonie "Sid" Baker. In 2025, Cooke starred in The Girlfriend, a psychological thriller miniseries, for Amazon Prime Video alongside Robin Wright and Laurie Davidson

== Personal life ==
Cooke lives in London as of 2025. She is in a relationship with actor Ralph Davis, her co-star in House of the Dragon.

== Filmography ==
=== Film ===
†	Denotes films that have not yet been released

Year	Title	Role	Notes	Ref.
2014	Ruby's Skin	Ruby	Short film	
2014	The Quiet Ones	Jane Harper / Evey Dwyer		
2014	The Signal	Haley Peterson		
2014	Ouija	Laine Morris		
2015	Me and Earl and the Dying Girl	Rachel Kushner		
2016	The Limehouse Golem	Elizabeth "Lizzie" Cree		
2016	Katie Says Goodbye	Katie		
2017	Thoroughbreds	Amanda		
2018	Ready Player One	Samantha Cooke / Art3mis		
2018	Follow the Roses	Angie	Short film	
2018	Life Itself	Dylan Dempsey		
2019	Sound of Metal	Louise "Lou" Berger		
2020	Pixie	Pixie O'Brien		
2020	Little Fish	Emma Ryerson	Also executive producer	
2021	Naked Singularity	Leah Deleon		
2022	Fireheart	Georgia Nolan (voice)		
2023	The Good Mother	Paige		
2026	A Talent for Murder	Clementine Balfour		
TBA	Visitation †	Sister Bernadette	Completed	
TBA	Brides †	Sally Bishop	Post-production	

=== Television ===
Year	Title	Role	Notes	Ref.
2012	Blackout	Meg Demoys	3 episodes	
2012	The Secret of Crickley Hall	Nancy Linnet	3 episodes	
2013–2017	Bates Motel	Emma Decody	Main role	
2015	Axe Cop	Loch Ness Monster (voice)	Episode: "Night Mission: The Extincter"	
2018	Vanity Fair	Becky Sharp	Main role; miniseries	
2019	Modern Love	Karla	2 episodes	
2022, 2026–present	Slow Horses	Sidonie "Sid" Baker	8 episodes	
2022–present	House of the Dragon	Alicent Hightower	Main role; 20 episodes	
2025	The Girlfriend	Cherry Laine	Main role	

=== Theater ===
Year	Title	Role	Venue	Ref.
2026	White Rabbit Red Rabbit	Performer	Duchess Theatre, West End	

=== Music videos ===
Year	Title	Role	Artist	Ref.
2012	"Autumn Term"	Student	One Direction	

=== Podcasts ===
Year	Title	Role	Ref.
2021	Soft Voice	Dark Voice	

== Awards and nominations ==
Year	Award	Category	Work	Result	Ref.
2014	Screen International	UK Stars of Tomorrow	—N/a	Won	
2015	Fangoria Chainsaw Awards	Best Supporting Actress	The Quiet Ones	3rd Place	
2015	San Diego Film Critics Society	Best Supporting Actress	Me and Earl and the Dying Girl	Nominated	
2015	Women's Image Network Awards	Best Actress – Feature Film	Me and Earl and the Dying Girl	Nominated	
2016	Empire Awards	Best Female Newcomer	Me and Earl and the Dying Girl	Nominated	
2017	Newport Beach Film Festival	Jury Award – Best Actress	Me and Earl and the Dying Girl	Won	
2018	MTV Movie & TV Awards	Best Kiss (with Tye Sheridan)	Ready Player One	Nominated	
2018	MTV Movie & TV Awards	Best On-Screen Team	Ready Player One	Nominated	
2018	Teen Choice Awards	Choice Sci-Fi Movie Actress	Ready Player One	Nominated	
2018	Teen Choice Awards	Choice Breakout Movie Star	Ready Player One	Nominated	
2020	San Diego Film Critics Society	Best Supporting Actress	Sound of Metal	Nominated	
