= Paige Spara =

American actress

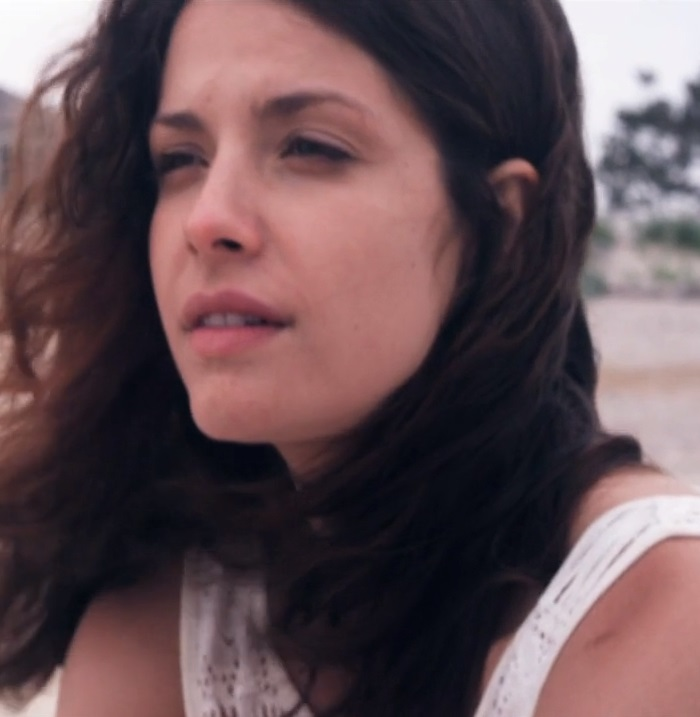
- Spara in the short film After the Hurricane in 2014
- Born: August 9, 1989 (age 37); Washington, Pennsylvania, U.S.
- Education: Marymount Manhattan College
- Occupation: Actress
- Years active: 2010–present

Paige Spara is an American actress best known for her main roles as Audrey Piatigorsky in the ABC Family sitcom Kevin from Work and Lea Dilallo in the ABC medical drama The Good Doctor.

== Early life ==
Spara was born in Washington, Pennsylvania, the daughter of hair-salon owner Kevin and dental hygienist Kim Spara. She has an older sister, Taylor, and younger brother, Jesse. She began acting at the age of 12 when she joined Kids' Theater Works. She continued acting at Washington High School, where she graduated in 2008. She honed her craft at Pittsburgh Community Theater and Irondale Theater in New York City.

Spara attended Point Park University in Pittsburgh for two years, studying acting, before transferring to Marymount Manhattan College, where she earned a degree in theater performance in 2012.

Before landing any film or television roles, she was a guide for a Gossip Girl bus tour in New York City and was filmed as a greeter. Her image was projected as a hologram welcoming visitors and travelers at Washington Dulles International Airport in Dulles, Virginia. After graduating from university, she moved to Los Angeles and spent three years auditioning before landing Kevin from Work.

== Career ==
Following roles in short films Prospect Street in 2010 and What Showers Bring and After the Hurricane in 2014, Spara's first main role came in 2015 as Audrey Piatigorsky in the ABC Family sitcom Kevin from Work, the co-worker to Noah Reid's Kevin Reese Daly. The show ran for 10 episodes until it was officially canceled that same year.

In 2017, Spara had a small role as a bartender in Home Again starring Reese Witherspoon.

Shortly after, she was cast in a recurring role in the ABC medical drama The Good Doctor as Lea Dilallo, the best friend, love interest, and future wife of the protagonist Shaun Murphy (played by Freddie Highmore). Spara was promoted to the main cast for the show's second season.

In 2017, Spara had a role in Lauv’s music video "I Like Me Better". In 2020, Spara directed and had a role in Sidny X Chaix's video "Just Friends."

== Other projects ==
Before landing her first television role of Audrey Piatigorsky on Kevin from Work, she appeared in commercials for Forevermark Jewelry, Sally Hansen nails, and Volkswagen Golf. Recently, Spara has been working on a podcast entitled The Inbetween.

== Filmography ==
Film
Year	Title	Role	Notes
2010	Prospect Street	Camilla	Short film
2014	What Showers Bring	Leah	Short film
2014	After the Hurricane	Charlie	Short film
2015	Audition	Woman/Herself	Documentary
2017	Home Again	Bartender	
2020	She's in Portland	Mallory	
2021	Stale Ramen	Charlotte	Short film

Television
Year	Title	Role	Notes
2015	Kevin from Work	Audrey Piatigorsky	Main role; 10 episodes
2017–2024	The Good Doctor	Lea Dilallo-Murphy	Recurring role (season 1); Main role (seasons 2–7)

Music Videos
Year	Title	Artist	Notes	Ref
2017	"I Like Me Better"	Lauv		
2020	"Just Friends"	Sidny X Chaix	Director	
