= Bria Samone Henderson =

American actress

- Born: December 31, 1992 (age 33); Richmond, Virginia, United States
- Occupation: Actress
- Years active: 2010–present

Bria Samone Henderson is an American actress. She is best known for playing Dr Jordan Allen in the medical drama series The Good Doctor and Margaret Sloan in the political drama series Mrs. America.

== Early life ==
Henderson was born in Richmond, Virginia on December 31st, 1992. She graduated with a bachelors degree in drama from Spelman College in 2015. She received her MFA in Acting at the University of Washington.

== Career ==
Henderson moved to Los Angeles in 2019 to begin her acting career. When she first arrived she found herself sleeping on couches and having many failed auditions. She eventually landed her first big role playing Margaret Sloan in the political drama series Mrs. America starring Cate Blanchett. Her biggest role so far has been playing Dr Jordan Allen in the medical drama series The Good Doctor starring Freddie Highmore. She made her directing debut with the short film Virginality which she also starred in. She also appeared in the short film “Prepared” and won the award for Outstanding Comedic Actress (Short Film) at the 3rd Annual Micheaux Film Festival.

== Personal life ==
Henderson is very spiritual. She has received critical acclaim for putting in effort to understand the characters she plays. For example when playing Sloan in Mrs. America she looked at an interview from the 70s to improve her performance.

== Filmography ==
=== Film ===
Year	Title	Role	Notes
2010	Hard to Be Me	Shakespeare Student	Short
2015	I See, You See	Simone	Short
2017	Street Wise	Unique	
2022	Prepared	Mia	Short
2023	Virginality	Jade	Short
2023	The Donor Party	Amandine	Short
2023	Honest Stuff	Vela	Short
2026	Angel City	Marlisa	

=== Television ===
Year	Title	Role	Notes
2020	Mrs. America	Margaret Sloan	4 episodes
2020–2024	The Good Doctor	Dr. Jordan Allen	66 episodes
2025	Side Quest	Cherry	Episode; Pull List
