= List of awards and nominations received by Freddie Highmore =

Freddie Highmore awards and nominations
Awards and nominations
| Award | Wins | Nominations |

Totals (Note: Certain award groups do not simply award one winner. They acknowledge several different recipients, have runners-up, and have third place. Since this is a specific recognition and is different from losing an award, runner-up mentions are considered wins in this award tally. For simplification and to avoid errors, each award in this list has been presumed to have had a prior nomination.)
- Wins: 12
- Nominations: 47

This is a list of awards and nominations received by English actor Freddie Highmore. For Finding Neverland (2004) and Charlie and the Chocolate Factory (2005), he won the Critics' Choice Movie Award for Best Young Performer in two consecutive years. For five seasons, Highmore starred as Norman Bates in the A&E drama-thriller series Bates Motel (2013–2017), for which he was thrice nominated for the Critics' Choice Television Award for Best Actor in a Drama Series. He made his screenwriting debut with the series, and in 2017 won a People's Choice Award for his performance. Also in 2017, he began starring as Dr. Shaun Murphy in the ABC drama series The Good Doctor, on which he also serves as a producer. For the role, he received his first Golden Globe Award nomination.

== Major associations ==
=== Critics' Choice Movie Awards ===
| Year | Nominated work | Category | Result | Ref. |
|---|---|---|---|---|
| 2005 | Finding Neverland | Best Young Performer | Won | |
| 2006 | Charlie and the Chocolate Factory | Best Young Performer | Won | |
| 2007 | A Good Year | Best Young Performer | Nominated | |
| 2008 | August Rush | Best Young Performer | Nominated | |

=== Critics' Choice Television Awards ===
| Year | Nominated work | Category | Result | Ref. |
|---|---|---|---|---|
| 2014 | Bates Motel | Best Actor in a Drama Series | Nominated | |
| 2015 | Bates Motel | Best Actor in a Drama Series | Nominated | |
| 2018 | Bates Motel | Best Actor in a Drama Series | Nominated | |
| 2019 | The Good Doctor | Best Actor in a Drama Series | Nominated | |
| 2020 | The Good Doctor | Best Actor in a Drama Series | Nominated | |

=== Golden Globe Awards ===
| Year | Nominated work | Category | Result | Ref. |
|---|---|---|---|---|
| 2018 | The Good Doctor | Best Actor – Television Series Drama | Nominated | |

=== Screen Actors Guild Awards ===
| Year | Nominated work | Category | Result | Ref. |
|---|---|---|---|---|
| 2005 | Finding Neverland | Outstanding Performance by a Male Actor in a Supporting Role | Nominated | |
| 2005 | Finding Neverland | Outstanding Performance by a Cast in a Motion Picture | Nominated | |

== Other awards and nominations ==
=== Capri Hollywood International Film Festival ===
| Year | Nominated work | Category | Result | Ref. |
|---|---|---|---|---|
| 2007 | August Rush | Capri Exploit Award | Won | |

=== Empire Awards ===
| Year | Nominated work | Category | Result | Ref. |
|---|---|---|---|---|
| 2005 | Finding Neverland | Best Newcomer | Won | |

=== Fangoria Chainsaw Awards ===
| Year | Nominated work | Category | Result | Ref. |
|---|---|---|---|---|
| 2016 | Bates Motel | Best TV Actor | Nominated | |

=== HCA TV Awards ===
| Year | Nominated work | Category | Result | Ref. |
|---|---|---|---|---|
| 2021 | The Good Doctor | Best Actor in a Broadcast Network or Cable Series, Drama | Nominated | |

=== Las Vegas Film Critics' Society Awards ===
| Year | Nominated work | Category | Result | Ref. |
|---|---|---|---|---|
| 2004 | Finding Neverland | Youth in Film | Won | |

=== London Film Critics' Circle Awards ===
| Year | Nominated work | Category | Result | Ref. |
|---|---|---|---|---|
| 2005 | Finding Neverland | British Newcomer of the Year | Nominated | |

=== MTV Movie & TV Awards ===
| Year | Nominated work | Category | Result | Ref. |
|---|---|---|---|---|
| 2005 | Finding Neverland | Best Breakthrough Performance | Nominated | |

=== Online Film and Television Association Awards ===
| Year | Nominated work | Category | Result | Ref. |
|---|---|---|---|---|
| 2014 | Finding Neverland | Best Youth Performance | Won | |
| 2014 | Finding Neverland | Best Breakthrough Performance | Nominated | |
| 2021 | The Good Doctor | Best Actor in a Drama Series | Nominated | |

=== People's Choice Awards ===
| Year | Nominated work | Category | Result | Ref. |
|---|---|---|---|---|
| 2014 | Bates Motel | Favorite TV Anti-Hero | Nominated | |
| 2017 | Bates Motel | Favorite Cable TV Actor | Won | |
| 2018 | The Good Doctor | The Male TV Star of 2018 | Nominated | |

=== Phoenix Film Critics Society Awards ===
| Year | Nominated work | Category | Result | Ref. |
|---|---|---|---|---|
| 2004 | Finding Neverland | Best Youth Actor | Won | |
| 2005 | Charlie and the Chocolate Factory | Best Youth Actor | Won | |

=== Satellite Awards ===
| Year | Nominated work | Category | Result | Ref. |
|---|---|---|---|---|
| 2005 | Finding Neverland | Outstanding New Talent | Won | |
| 2014 | Bates Motel | Best Actor – Television Series Drama | Nominated | |

=== Saturn Awards ===
| Year | Nominated work | Category | Result | Ref. |
|---|---|---|---|---|
| 2005 | Finding Neverland | Best Performance by a Younger Actor | Nominated | |
| 2006 | Charlie and the Chocolate Factory | Best Performance by a Younger Actor | Nominated | |
| 2008 | August Rush | Best Performance by a Younger Actor | Won | |
| 2009 | The Spiderwick Chronicles | Best Performance by a Younger Actor | Nominated | |
| 2014 | Bates Motel | Best Actor on Television | Nominated | |
| 2017 | Bates Motel | Best Actor on Television | Nominated | |

=== Teen Choice Awards ===
| Year | Nominated work | Category | Result | Ref. |
|---|---|---|---|---|
| 2018 | The Good Doctor | Best TV Actor - Drama | Nominated | |

=== Utah Film Critics Association Awards ===
| Year | Nominated work | Category | Result | Ref. |
|---|---|---|---|---|
| 2004 | Finding Neverland | Best Supporting Actor | Nominated | |

=== Young Artist Awards ===
| Year | Nominated work | Category | Result | Ref. |
|---|---|---|---|---|
| 2005 | Finding Neverland | Best Performance in a Feature Film – Young Ensemble Cast | Won | |
| 2005 | Finding Neverland | Best Leading Young Actor in a Feature Film | Nominated | |
| 2006 | Charlie and the Chocolate Factory | Best Leading Young Actor in a Feature Film | Nominated | |
| 2007 | Arthur and the Invisibles | Best Performance in an International Feature Film – Leading Young Actor | Nominated | |
| 2008 | August Rush | Best Leading Young Actor in a Feature Film | Nominated | |
| 2009 | The Spiderwick Chronicles | Best Leading Young Actor in a Feature Film | Nominated | |
| 2010 | Astro Boy | Best Voice Over Role | Nominated | |
