= Kevin from Work =

2015 American television sitcom

- Promotional poster
- Genre: Sitcom
- Created by: Barbara Adler
- Starring: Noah Reid; Paige Spara; Jordan Hinson; Matt Murray; Punam Patel
- Composer: Dominic Lewis
- Country of origin: United States
- Original language: English
- No. of seasons: 1
- No. of episodes: 10

Production
- Executive producers: Barbara Adler; Aaron Kaplan; McG; Mary Viola
- Producer: Michele Greco
- Camera setup: Single-camera
- Running time: 20-25 minutes
- Production companies: 40 or 50 Years, Inc.; Wonderland Sound and Vision; Kapital Entertainment

Original release
- Network: ABC Family
- Release: August 12 – October 7, 2015

Kevin from Work is an American sitcom that aired on ABC Family from August 12 to October 7, 2015. The pilot was ordered on January 6, 2015 and picked up to series on March 24, 2015.

On March 4, 2016, Kevin from Work was officially cancelled after one season.

== Cast ==
=== Main characters ===
- Noah Reid as Kevin Reese Daly, an employee of a major food distribution company Superior Foods & Beverages. He's in love with his co-worker Audrey and reveals this in a letter to her shortly before beginning a job at a new company in Italy. At the last minute, his new company cancels on him, forcing him to return working for Superior.
- Paige Spara as Audrey Piatigorsky, who works next to Kevin at the office. They became quick friends when he started three years prior to the events of the pilot but he was unable to reveal his feelings for her because she has been in a relationship with her boyfriend Brock, a martial artist, since college.
- Jordan Hinson as Roxie Daly, Kevin's little sister who left home to live in Los Angeles. Kevin wanted to leave her his apartment after getting the Italy job offer, but is now forced to live with her after it fell through.
- Matt Murray as Brian, Kevin's best friend and a fitness coach at a local gym.
- Punam Patel as Patti, Audrey's roommate who is stalking Kevin after he slept with her in an attempt to get back the letter he sent to Audrey.

=== Recurring characters ===
- Jason Rogel as Ricky, a gossiping co-worker of Kevin and Audrey who writes a gossip column in the company's newsletter.
- Amy Sedaris as Julia, Kevin and Audrey's boss at Superior Foods & Beverages. Julia is hinted to be using sex to get what she wants and regularly sleeping with her employees.
- Nik Dodani as Paul Garfunkel and Bryan Coffee as Simon, two co-workers of Kevin's who call themselves "Hall & Oates" (because Simon paces the halls and Paul likes to eat dry oats).
- Brian George as Samir, lawyer and Patti's father who is dating Julia.
- Matthew Florida as Brock, Audrey's martial artist boyfriend.
- Neal Dandade as Dr. Dev, Patti's boyfriend who is a club DJ and a doctor.

=== Cameo ===
- Fred Willard as Roger Trousdale, a television star

== Episodes ==
No.	Title	Directed by	Written by	Original release date	Prod. code	U.S. viewers (millions)
1	"Pilot"	McG	Barbara Adler	August 12, 2015	1001	0.58
Kevin Daly is about to move abroad for a new job. After getting drunk at his farewell party, he writes a letter confessing his ongoing love to his coworker Audrey Pitagorski who sits one cubicle next to him. Sober again, he tries to intercept the letter and even sleeps with Audrey's housemate Patti, but in vain. Eventually, Kevin learns that his job offer was retracted and he is to remain in the same office as Audrey.
2	"Gossip from Work"	McG	Barbara Adler	August 12, 2015	1002	0.37
After confessing his love to Audrey, Kevin tries to avoid her at work, even asking for a different desk to not see her; at the same time, he discovers that his love letter to Audrey is the subject of a gossip column written by their co-worker Ricky in the company's newsletter, the "Superior Scoop", leading him and Audrey to reluctantly join forces to stop it. Meanwhile, his best friend Brian tries to get rid of his "replacement best friend" Don (Tony Cavalero), whom he met on the internet after thinking Kevin was moving away and Kevin's sister Roxie bonds — unwillingly at first — with Patti when she shows up in Kevin's apartment looking for him.
3	"Who's Your Friend from Work"	Victor Nelli, Jr.	Adam Stein	August 19, 2015	1003	0.40
Audrey sets up Kevin with her friend Lauren, but soon Audrey becomes jealous of all the fun they are having as a couple. Refusing to work a responsible job as an adult, Roxie decides she wants to be an actress. Brian is hired as Patti's in-home personal trainer, feeling pressure from his co-workers, Brian uses the opportunity to sleep with Patti.
4	"All About Work from Work"	John Fortenberry	Jessica Conrad	August 26, 2015	1004	0.26
The Superior Foods & Beverages office receives their employee report cards, and Ricky's performance is less than stellar, so Kevin agrees to help him for an important business presentation. With Kevin being too busy helping Ricky, he has less time to spend with Brian. So Brian spends time with Roxie instead, not knowing that Roxie is only using him as her assistant. Julia fears she will be fired by corporate, Audrey sees this as in opportunity to boost her own employee performance, so she has Patti's dad Samir (Brian George), who is a lawyer help. However, Julia and Samir's relationship becomes sexual, much to Patti's dismay.
5	"Roommates from Work"	Fred Goss	Barbara Wallace & Thomas R. Wolfe	September 2, 2015	1005	0.38
Tired of getting pressure from Kevin to be more responsible, Roxie moves out of Kevin's place to stay with Patti. Brian agrees to be Ricky's trainer, but Ricky would rather gossip instead, like he does at the Superior Foods & Beverages office.
6	"Birthday from Work"	Michael Patrick Jann	Christine Zander	September 9, 2015	1006	0.31
It's Kevin's birthday, but he doesn't want to make a big deal about it after the bad year he had. Julia has an emergency involving her cat Rutger, leaving Kevin in charge at the Superior Foods & Beverages office. Audrey feels that she should have been the one left in charge and Kevin gives her that opportunity when Kevin goes home for an emergency at his apartment, but the employees no matter who is in charge are not being cooperative to work. Brian and Roxie plan a surprise birthday party for Kevin at his apartment. Patti begins her internship at Superior Foods & Beverages to warm to Julia who is dating her dad.
7	"Secrets from Work"	Linda Mendoza	J. Michael Feldman & Debbie Jhoon	September 16, 2015	1007	0.30
While Julia is away, Kevin discovers that she has a secret bathroom in her office. Kevin tells Audrey about the bathroom, with them having a great time keeping the secret to themselves until she ends up telling Ricky. Tired that Dev puts his DJ and medical career above her, Patti threatens to break up with him, but when Dev agrees to break up, Patti is left devastated, wallowing in Kevin's new pull out couch.
8	"Aftershock from Work"	Linda Mendoza	Barbara Wallace & Thomas R. Wolfe	September 30, 2015	1008	0.30
Kevin is excited to have a video interview with a headhunter about a new job. After an earthquake hits town, Julia leaves Kevin in charge of conducting an earthquake drill at Superior Foods & Beverages. Kevin has reached the point where he is tired of Audrey frequently mentioning her relationship with Brock. Roxie, who slept through the earthquake, refuses to leave Kevin's side while he is at work. Brian helps Dev come off as more of a man to Patti, after acting like a wimp during the earthquake.
9	"Escape from Work"	Jay Karas	Christine Zander	October 7, 2015	1009	0.15
Sick from work, Kevin is taken cared off by Brian and Roxie. They then have a handsome home nurse take care of Kevin, until Brian becomes jealous believing that Roxie has fallen for him. Audrey has Patti come along on her date with Brock, but after feeling like a third wheel on her own date, Audrey becomes tired of Patti being the boss of every aspect of her life.
10	"Team Kevin from Work"	Jay Chandrasekhar	Barbara Adler	October 7, 2015	1010	0.12
Kevin is offered a job in Italy, but is hesitant to take the offer after hearing that Audrey and Brock have temporarily separated. Kevin uses this as his opportunity to finally pursue a relationship with Audrey, so Roxie spends time with Audrey and Brian spends time with Brock to get information to see if they are finally over. Samir financially cuts off Patti, with her later landing a job in cosmetics.

== Reception ==
On Rotten Tomatoes, the series has an aggregated score of 55% based on 6 positive and 5 negative critic reviews. The website consensus reads: "Kevin from Work relies on raunchy jokes delivered by unsavory characters, but the show's gags hit their targets often enough to elevate a rather routine premise."
