= Shaun Murphy (The Good Doctor) =

Fictional character from The Good Doctor

- The Good Doctor character
- Dr. Shaun Murphy, portrayed by Freddie Highmore
- First appearance: "Burnt Food" (2017)
- Last appearance: "Goodbye" (2024)
- Created by: David Shore
- Based on: Park Si-on (Good Doctor)
- Portrayed by: Freddie Highmore (adult); Graham Verchere (teen); Winslow Fegley (child)

In-universe information
- Full name: Shaun Robert Murphy
- Gender: Male
- Title(s): MD, FACS
- Occupation: Surgical Attending at St. Bonaventure Hospital; Chief of Surgery; Attending General Surgeon (formerly); Surgical Resident (formerly); Pathology Resident (temporarily)
- Family: Ethan Murphy (father); Marcie Murphy (mother); Steve Murphy (younger brother)
- Spouse: Lea Abigail Dilallo (wife)
- Children: Steven Aaron Murphy (son) Maddie Murphy (daughter)
- Relatives: Aaron Glassman (surrogate father)
- Origin: Casper, Wyoming, U.S
- Nationality: American

Dr. Shaun Robert Murphy is a fictional character and the protagonist of the American medical drama The Good Doctor. The character was created by showrunner David Shore and portrayed by English actor Freddie Highmore. An autistic surgical resident with savant syndrome at the fictional San Jose St. Bonaventure Hospital, Murphy develops a relationship with Lea Dilallo (Paige Spara) throughout the show. The character received mixed reception, polarizing critics.

== Storylines ==
Shaun Murphy first appears in the show's pilot episode "Burnt Food", where his unique ability to visualize the human body helps him stabilize an injured child. Aaron Glassman (Richard Schiff), president of San Jose St. Bonaventure Hospital, advocates he be hired despite a board that believes he is unsuitable.

== Development ==
=== Casting ===
In February 2017, Deadline Hollywood reported that English actor Freddie Highmore had been cast as Shaun Murphy. In flashbacks, Murphy is portrayed by Canadian actor Graham Verchere.

=== Characterization ===
In developing the character of Shaun Murphy, ABC Entertainment president Channing Dungey said that audiences yearn for a lighter protagonist in comparison to the rise of the antihero on television. Showrunner David Shore said that Murphy was neither a drinker nor a womanizer. Speaking for his portrayal of the character, Highmore said, "He's not cynical, he's not judgmental." At Series Mania, Highmore argued that Murphy plays a larger role as someone who demonstrates masculinity while deviating from stereotypical depictions of a masculine person.

A defining condition of the character is his subversion of social norms, stoic body language, and difficulty maintaining eye contact, framed in contrast to his social deficits. According to Highmore, Murphy was not written to be representative of the autistic community as a whole but rather one specific individual. Murphy's thoughts are depicted on-screen as graphics ranging from medical illustrations to modern animations. According to executive producer Seth Gordon, these graphics were visualized in the pilot episode by Gordon who has a background in visual effects and by using Adobe After Effects. These scenes became more elaborate, with cinematographers using tilt shift lenses.

== Reception ==
Throughout the run of The Good Doctor, the character has polarized audiences. A 2019 study stated that audiences who watched The Good Doctor gathered a greater knowledge of autism than they would have from a college lecture on the subject. Conversely, Autistic Doctors International founder Mary Doherty said that Murphy's portrayal was a "missed opportunity". In one scene, a convenience store robber tells Murphy to show his hands and hand him his wallet. In response, Murphy says that the robber "can't see [his] hands" if he reaches for his wallet, leading to the robber firing a shot and injuring a bystander; Autistic Women & Nonbinary Network senior advisor Ly Xīnzhèn M. Zhǎngsūn Brown said that the scene was inaccurate. Brown also criticized the inaccuracy of Murphy as a savant, a criticism shared by several researchers in The Lancet. In Mental Health Disorders on Television: Representation Versus Reality, Kimberley McMahon-Coleman and Roslyn Weaver compared Murphy with autistic savant Raymond Babbitt, played by Dustin Hoffman in Rain Man (1988), as did Murray Pomerance and R. Barton Palmer.

In an essay published in JAMA, Abigail Zuger posed the question on whether a doctor could succeed with autism, writing, "But should a persistent and profound inability to communicate with patients be considered a disability to be overcome in medicine or a nonnegotiable disqualification?" Zuger also noted the ambiguity of the show's title in reference to either Murphy or the various persons of color within the show—such as Claire Brown (Antonia Thomas) or Jared Kalu (Chuku Modu); although Murphy saves lives, he does so at a greater cost than most other doctors. Murphy is the subject of a bioethics study conducted in 2018, which found that the show could be used to teach bioethics to health sciences students. Several researchers compared Murphy favorably to Atypical's Sam Gardner and Speechless's JJ DiMio, who has cerebral palsy, as an optimistic character.

Critically, the character of Shaun Murphy has received some praise. The New York Times television critic James Poniewozik called Murphy an "anti-anti hero" in contrast to Gregory House, the protagonist of House; both shows were created by David Shore. In the season one episode "She", Murphy is shown failing to comprehend a transgender patient. Slate journalist Sara Luterman, who is autistic herself, noted an overlap between autism and transgender individuals. Luterman later stated to The Washington Post that although she reviewed the show's first season favorably, she no longer watches the show.
