= The Canterville Ghost (2023 film) =

2023 British animated film

- Official poster
- Directed by: Kim Burdon
- Screenplay by: Giles New; Keiron Self
- Based on: The Canterville Ghost by Oscar Wilde
- Produced by: Gina Carter; Robert Chandler; Martin Metz; Adrian Politowski
- Starring: Stephen Fry; Hugh Laurie; Freddie Highmore; Emily Carey; Imelda Staunton; Toby Jones; Miranda Hart; David Harewood; Meera Syal
- Edited by: Ronnie Quinlan
- Music by: Craig Stuart Garfinkle; Eimear Noone
- Production companies: Align; Melmoth Films; Space Age Films; Sprout Pictures; Toonz Media Group
- Distributed by: Signature Entertainment
- Release date: 22 September 2023 (United Kingdom)
- Running time: 89 minutes
- Country: United Kingdom
- Language: English

The Canterville Ghost is a 2023 British animated fantasy comedy film directed by Kim Burdon and Robert Chandler. It is based on the short story of the same name by Oscar Wilde. The film stars the voices of Stephen Fry, Hugh Laurie, Freddie Highmore, Emily Carey, Imelda Staunton, Toby Jones, Miranda Hart, David Harewood, and Meera Syal.

== Plot ==
Sir Simon de Canterville has been haunting the grounds of his country estate for more than 300 years, driving the fear into anyone daring to occupy his manor. In 1900, an American family by the name of Otis moves into the house: inventor Hiram, his wife Lucretia, preteen twin sons Kent and Louis, and young adult tomboy daughter Virginia, who is not pleased with her move. The very first night, Sir Simon visits the Otises, but to his indignation none of them are scared of him.

The next day, Virginia meets Henry, the young Duke of Cheshire, and while getting to know him, they pass an enclosed garden. As she tries to climb over the wall, the gardener inside cuts a rose in front of her, and she suddenly falls off the wall, choking. After she is caught by Henry and recovers, a strange crow leads her to a broken bridge, from which she spots a locket in the lake below. After the gardener startles her into falling into the water, she recovers the locket but gets snared by the water weeds and nearly drowns until Henry rescues her. Inside the locket, Virginia finds portraits of Sir Simon and a noblewoman. Mrs. Umney, the manor's housekeeper, tells her that there is no gardener on the estate and identifies the woman as Lady Elenore, Sir Simon's wife said to have been drowned by her husband, thus condemning him to never rest until a prophecy, hidden somewhere on the estate, is fulfilled.

The next night, Sir Simon haunts the Otises once more, with the same humiliating results. When he sees the locket hanging around Virginia's neck and she confronts him, Sir Simon vehemently denies the alleged murder, stating that Elenore's death was an accident and he couldn't save her because he was snagged by a nearby rosebush. Touched by the ghost's sincerity, Virginia befriends him and offers her help, but for reasons he will not tell, Sir Simon refuses.

The following winter, Virginia meets Reverend Chasuble and his wife Algernean Van Finchley, an overenthusiastic ghost hunter intent on capturing Sir Simon. While the Otises have come to somewhat accept the ghost's presence, his antics imperil their prospects at building profitable relations with members of the English high society at an upcoming banquet which Hiram wants to host in the manor. Virginia discovers an everchanging picture inside a storybook about Canterville Chase depicting a girl opening the gate to the walled garden, but before she and Henry can follow it up, Sir Simon nearly attacks Henry because his ancestor, the Duke of Cheshire, had caused Elenore's death and had him entombed alive to seize the Canterville estate for himself.

Virginia, who does not want to stay in England, and Sir Simon, feeling obsolete, withdraw themselves until the night of the banquet. As Henry encourages Virginia to mingle with the guests, the outraged Sir Simon scares the visitors away and sets the manor on fire, but when Virginia is endangered, he ruefully changes his mind and puts the fire out. Hiram and Lucretia enlist Algernean to neutralize the ghost, despite Virginia's protests. While Kent and Louis try to run interference, Virginia joins Sir Simon in his death cell, where she finds a picture of the walled garden bearing a plaque with the prophecy.

Determined to help Sir Simon find his salvation, Virginia goes to the walled garden and uncovers the plaque. Sir Simon explains that the prophecy demands an innocent pleads his case to the Grim Reaper, but at a heavy price. Still resolute, Virginia passes the gate and enters a spirit world version of the garden, unknowingly leaving her lifeless body behind. Inside, she and Sir Simon meet the gardener, who identifies himself as the Reaper and reveals that he wants to put an end to Sir Simon's hauntings. And by entering his Garden of Death, Virginia has trapped herself in his domain as well.

Sir Simon faces the Reaper in a duel for their freedom. When he gains the upper hand, the Reaper cheats by turning himself into a monster and overwhelms him until Virginia intervenes. Outside the Garden, the Otises, Henry and Algernean frantically try to revive Virginia. Henry discovers the prophecy and gains entrance into the Garden, where he joins Virginia against the Reaper and proclaims his love for her. With Sir Simon's help, they defeat the Reaper, who then assumes the form of the old Duke of Cheshire and fights Sir Simon once more until they both stab each other to a draw. The Reaper releases Virginia and Henry but declares that Sir Simon is to stay in his Garden forever.

As Sir Simon turns to stone, Virginia and Henry return to the mortal world. Reentering the garden, they find Sir Simon's petrified form; as Virginia cries for him, she inadvertently fulfills the prophecy, freeing him. Reunited, Sir Simon and Elenore pass on to the afterlife, and the film ends with Virginia and Henry's wedding.

== Voice cast ==
- Stephen Fry as Sir Simon de Canterville
- Emily Carey as Virginia Otis
- Freddie Highmore as Henry Duke of Cheshire
- Hugh Laurie as The Grim Reaper
- David Harewood as Hiram Otis
- Meera Syal as Lucretia Otis
- Imelda Staunton as Mrs. Umney
- Toby Jones as The Reverend Chasuble aka The Vicar
- Miranda Hart as Algernean Van Finchley, the Ghost Catcher
