= The Good Doctor (American TV series) =

American medical drama television series (2017–2024)

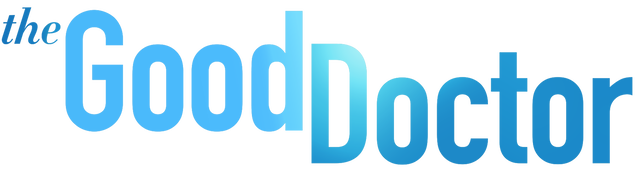
- Genre: Medical drama
- Based on: Good Doctor by Park Jae-beom
- Developed by: David Shore
- Showrunners: David Shore; Liz Friedman
- Starring: Freddie Highmore; Nicholas Gonzalez; Antonia Thomas; Chuku Modu; Beau Garrett; Irene Keng; Hill Harper; Richard Schiff; Tamlyn Tomita; Fiona Gubelmann; Will Yun Lee; Christina Chang; Paige Spara; Jasika Nicole; Bria Samoné Henderson; Noah Galvin; Osvaldo Benavides; Brandon Larracuente
- Composer: Dan Romer
- Country of origin: United States
- Original language: English
- No. of seasons: 7
- No. of episodes: 126 (list of episodes)

Production
- Executive producers: David Shore; Seth Gordon; Daniel Dae Kim; Erin Gunn; David Kim; Sebastian Lee; Mike Listo; Thomas L. Moran; Freddie Highmore; David Hoselton; Liz Friedman; Peter Blake; Garrett Lerner; Jessica Grasl
- Producers: Ron French; Freddie Highmore; Konshik Yu; Min Soo Kee; Shawn Williamson; David Renaud; Rebecca Moline; Tracy Taylor
- Production location: Vancouver, British Columbia
- Camera setup: Single-camera
- Running time: 41–44 minutes
- Production companies: Shore Z Productions; 3AD; EnterMedia; ABC Signature (Note: Credited as ABC Studios from seasons 1–3.); Sony Pictures Television (Note: Credited as Sony Pictures Television Studios from seasons 3–6.)

Original release
- Network: ABC
- Release: September 25, 2017 – May 21, 2024

Related
- Good Doctor

The Good Doctor is an American medical drama television series, a remake of the 2013 South Korean series of the same name, which aired on ABC from September 25, 2017, to May 21, 2024, lasting seven seasons and 126 episodes. The series stars Freddie Highmore as Shaun Murphy, a young surgical resident with autism and savant syndrome at the fictional San Jose St. Bonaventure Hospital. Christina Chang, Richard Schiff, Will Yun Lee, Fiona Gubelmann, Paige Spara, Noah Galvin and Bria Samoné Henderson also star in the show. Nicholas Gonzalez, Antonia Thomas, Chuku Modu, Beau Garrett, Hill Harper, Tamlyn Tomita, Jasika Nicole, Osvaldo Benavides and Brandon Larracuente used to also star or had recurring roles in the show, but their characters were written out of the storyline as the series progressed. Modu reprised his role in the sixth season and became a series regular once again in the seventh season.

Actor Daniel Dae Kim noticed the original series and bought the rights for his production company. He began adapting the series and, in 2015, eventually shopped it to CBS Television Studios. CBS decided against creating a pilot, but, because Kim felt so strongly about the series, he bought back the rights from CBS. Eventually, Sony Pictures Television and Kim worked out a deal and brought on David Shore, creator of the Fox medical drama House, to develop the series. The series received a put pilot commitment at ABC and The Good Doctor was ordered to series in May 2017. On October 3, 2017, ABC picked up the series for a full season of 18 episodes. The series is primarily filmed in Vancouver, British Columbia, Canada. David Shore and Liz Friedman serve as co-showrunners and Daniel Dae Kim is an executive producer for the show. The show is produced by Sony Pictures Television and ABC Signature, in association with production companies Shore Z Productions, 3AD, and Entermedia.

The series debuted on September 25, 2017. The Good Doctor has received generally mixed reviews from critics, who have praised Highmore's performance but criticized the series' storylines and its portrayal of autistic people. In April 2023, the series was renewed for a seventh season and premiered on February 20, 2024. It was later announced to be the final season.

== Premise ==
The series follows Shaun Murphy, a young surgeon with autism and savant syndrome from the small city of Casper, Wyoming, where he had a troubled past. He relocates to San Jose, California, to work at the prestigious San Jose St. Bonaventure Hospital.

== Cast and characters ==
=== Overview ===
Actor	Character	Seasons						
Actor	Character	1	2	3	4	5	6	7
Freddie Highmore	Dr. Shaun Murphy	Main	Main	Main	Main	Main	Main	Main
Nicholas Gonzalez	Dr. Neil Melendez	Main	Main	Main	Guest			
Antonia Thomas	Dr. Claire Browne	Main	Main	Main	Main	Guest		Guest
Chuku Modu	Dr. Jared Kalu	Main (Note: Modu is credited as a series regular from 1x01 through 2x01.)	Main				Recurring	Main
Beau Garrett	Jessica Preston	Main			Guest			
Irene Keng	Dr. Elle McLean	Main (Note: Keng was credited as a series regular in only the first episode. Subsequent episodes no longer feature her, nor credit her.)						
Hill Harper	Dr. Marcus Andrews	Main	Main	Main	Main	Main	Main	
Richard Schiff	Dr. Aaron Glassman	Main	Main	Main	Main	Main	Main	Main
Tamlyn Tomita	Allegra Aoki	Main	Main	Guest				
Will Yun Lee	Dr. Alex Park	Recurring	Main	Main	Main	Main	Main	Main
Fiona Gubelmann	Dr. Morgan Reznick	Recurring	Main	Main	Main	Main	Main	Main
Christina Chang	Dr. Audrey Lim	Recurring	Main	Main	Main	Main	Main	Main
Paige Spara	Lea Dilallo-Murphy	Recurring	Main	Main	Main	Main	Main	Main
Jasika Nicole	Dr. Carly Lever	Recurring	Recurring	Main				
Bria Samone Henderson	Dr. Jordan Allen				Recurring	Main	Main	Main
Noah Galvin	Dr. Asher Wolke				Recurring	Main (Note: Galvin is credited as a series regular from 5x01 through 7x05.)	Main	Main
Osvaldo Benavides	Dr. Mateo Rendón Osma				Guest	Main (Note: Benavides is credited as a series regular from 5x01 through 5x04.)		
Brandon Larracuente	Dr. Daniel "Danny" Perez						Main (Note: Larracuente is credited as a series regular starting from 6x12.)	Guest
Kayla Cromer	Charlotte 'Charlie' Lukaitis							Main
Wavyy Jonez	Dominick 'Dom' Hubank							Main

=== Main ===
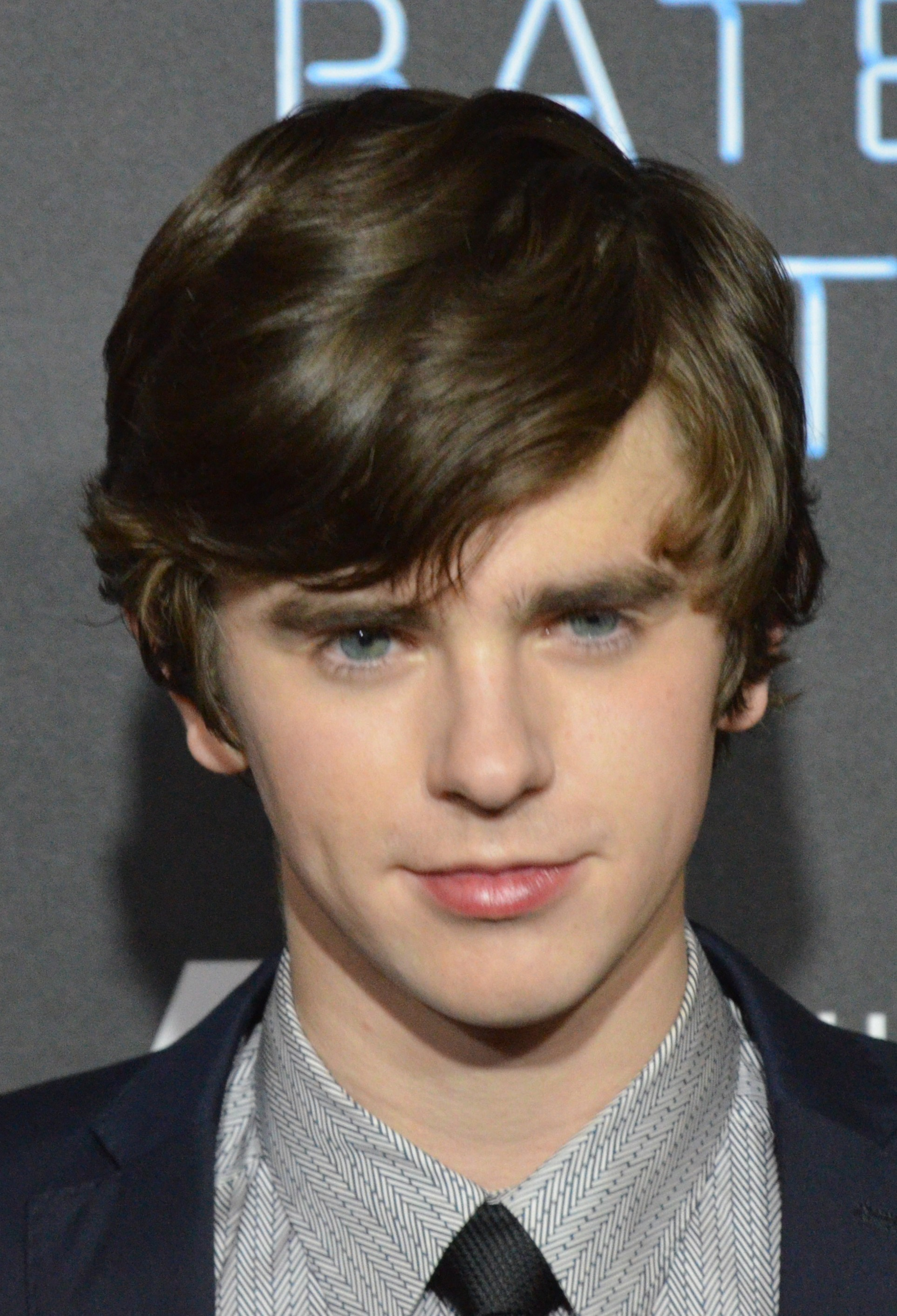
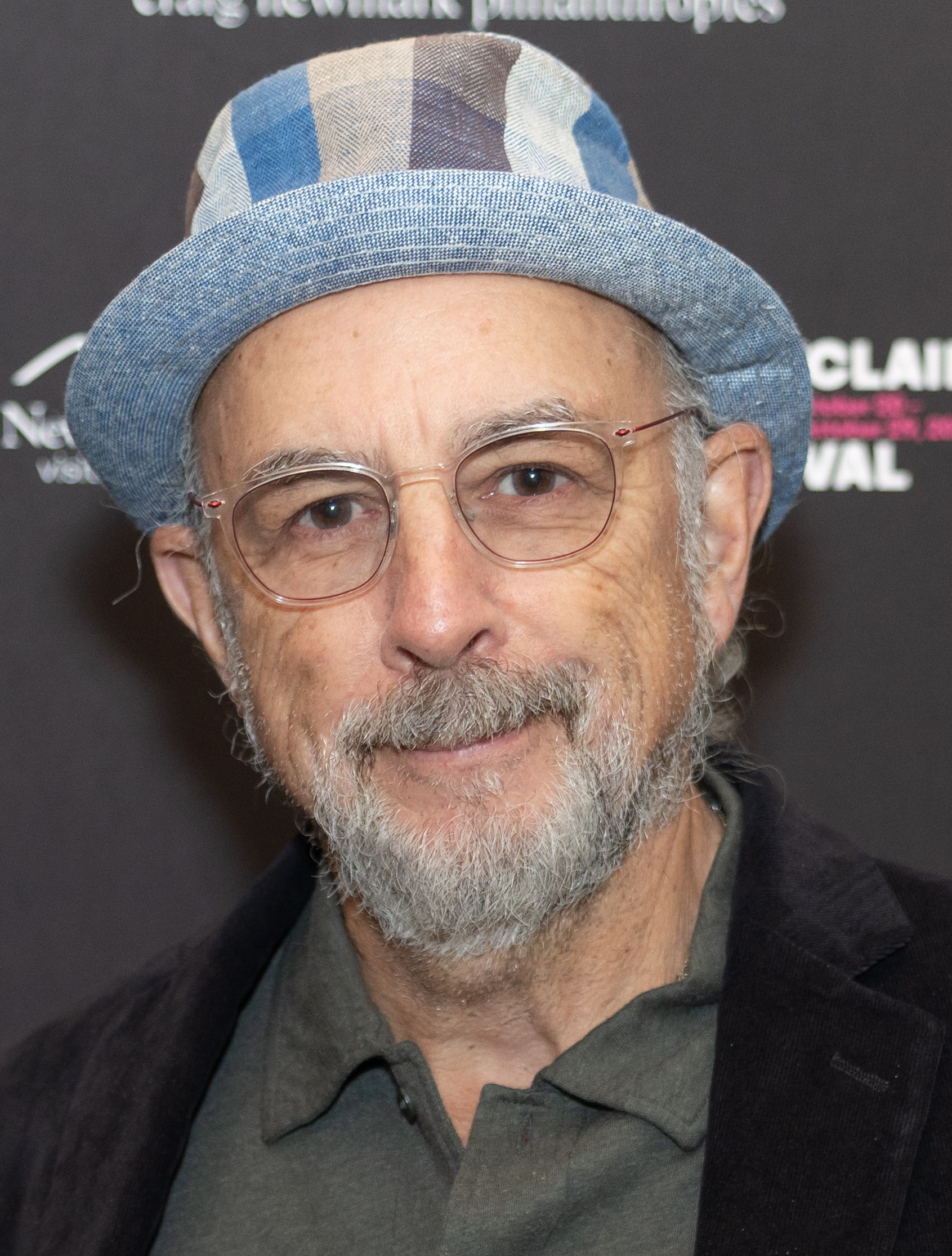
The series stars Freddie Highmore and Richard Schiff.
- Freddie Highmore as Dr. Shaun Murphy, an autistic and troubled surgeon with savant syndrome. His skills include near-photographic recall and the ability to note minute details and changes. His hiring created a divided opinion among the board. At the end of season 5, he marries Lea Dilallo. In season 6, he becomes a surgical attending after completing his residency. At the end of season 6, Lea gives birth to their son Steven Aaron Murphy. In a flashforward in the series finale, Shaun becomes the Chief of Surgery and runs the Dr. Aaron Glassman Foundation for Neurodiversity in Medicine with Claire. Shaun and Lea also have a daughter together (named Maddie after Dr. Glassman's deceased daughter). He is portrayed in flashbacks to his teen years by Graham Verchere (season 1, guest seasons 2, 3, 5) and his child years by Kashton Brostl (guest season 7).
- Nicholas Gonzalez as Dr. Neil Melendez (seasons 1–3; special guest season 4), an attending cardiothoracic surgeon who was in charge of the surgical residents. In the season 3 finale, he succumbs to fatal injuries suffered during an earthquake. He returns as visions to Dr. Claire Browne in season 4.
- Antonia Thomas as Dr. Claire Browne (seasons 1–4; guest seasons 5 and 7), a surgical resident who forms a close friendship with Shaun. Claire is known for her empathy and emotional maturity, and is usually very patient and understanding when communicating with Shaun. At the end of season 4, she decides to remain in Guatemala in order to continue helping the less fortunate obtain necessary medical care. In season 5, she returns to celebrate Shaun's wedding and to seek her friends' help with treating one of her patients. Claire also reveals that she has been offered the position of Chief of Surgery at the Guatemala hospital which she later takes. Claire later returns in season 7 for treatment for breast cancer and reunites with Jared. In the series finale, Claire loses her left arm to an infection and, in flashforwards, marries Jared, has a daughter with him, and runs the Dr. Aaron Glassman Foundation for Neurodiversity in Medicine with Shaun.
- Chuku Modu as Dr. Jared Kalu (seasons 1–2and 7; recurring season 6), a surgical resident from a wealthy family. He moves to Denver at the start of season 2 after conflicting with Dr. Andrews, who fired him for assaulting an employee who tried to take advantage of Claire, leading Jared to get his job back by suing the hospital for racism, at the cost of losing Andrews and Melendez's respect of him. In season six, Jared returns as a concierge doctor seeking Shaun's help with his client. With Shaun's encouragement, Jared returns to St. Bonaventure as a first-year resident on Shaun's team. In a flashforward in the series finale, Jared marries Claire and starts a family with her.
- Beau Garrett as Jessica Preston (season 1; guest season 4), the hospital in-house attorney and Vice President of Risk Management. She is the granddaughter of the hospital founder, a friend of Glassman, and Melendez's ex-fiancée.
- Irene Keng as Dr. Elle McLean (season 1), a surgical resident.
- Hill Harper as Dr. Marcus Andrews (seasons 1–6), an attending surgeon specializing in plastic surgery. In season one he is the Chief of Surgery who is eyeing Dr. Glassman's job as hospital president. In season 2, he becomes president after Glassman resigns. After being fired as hospital president for firing Dr. Jackson Han, the new chief, to rehire Shaun, he accepts an offer to return as attending surgeon from Dr. Lim. In the season 3 premiere, he grows into this role as Shaun reminds him what an important "Good Samaritan" he is. His niece Dr. Olivia Jackson is one of the surgical residents in season 4. In season 5, he replaces Dr. Lim as Chief of Surgery and he is reinstated as hospital president after the Ethicure acquisition is called off. It is also revealed in the same season that he is dyslexic. At the end of season 6, he resigns his position when the board calls for a meeting to discuss his questionable decisions while entering a relationship with nurse Villanueva. In season 7, he is mentioned to be touring the world.
- Richard Schiff as Dr. Aaron Glassman, former President of San Jose St. Bonaventure Hospital and now attending neurosurgeon, who has been a mentor and good friend of Shaun since he was 14. In season 2, he steps down as hospital president when he is diagnosed with cancer and Shaun tries to help improve his health. In season 3, he is reinstated after Andrews is fired and marries barista Debbie, but they divorce in season 4 following a series of arguments. In season 6, Shaun finds out that Glassman suffered a ministroke that leaves him unable to perform further surgeries, but Glassman feels betrayed and hurt when he tries to intervene and is absent when Lea gives birth to Steven, but still sends a gift for the baby. In season 7, he and Lim become the co-interim presidents of the hospital following Andrews' departure, while making amends with Shaun. His cancer also returns in the penultimate episode, and he eventually dies of it in the series finale.
- Tamlyn Tomita as Allegra Aoki (seasons 1–2; guest, season 3), Chairwoman of the San Jose St. Bonaventure Hospital Board and Vice President of the foundation that controls the hospital's funding.
- Fiona Gubelmann as Dr. Morgan Reznick (seasons 2–7; recurring, season 1), a competitive surgical resident who has a subtle rivalry with Claire as they have opposite personalities and work ethics. In season 4, she switches from surgery to internal medicine due to the damage she inflicted on her hands at the end of season 3. In season 6, Morgan works on becoming a mother, eventually adopting an orphaned baby named Eden in the series finale. In "Unconditional", she and Park get married.
- Will Yun Lee as Dr. Alex Park (seasons 2–7; recurring, season 1), a surgical resident and a former police officer from Phoenix, Arizona who decided to become a doctor. In season 4, he starts a relationship with Morgan before breaking up with her in season 6 after she turns down at the last minute a job offer at New York. He also becomes a surgical attending along with Shaun. In "Unconditional", he and Morgan get married.
- Christina Chang as Dr. Audrey Lim (seasons 2–7; recurring, season 1), an attending trauma surgeon in charge of the ER and surgical residents and later the Chief of Surgery. In season 4, she develops post-traumatic stress disorder from her experiences with treating the COVID-19 pandemic. In the season 5 finale, Lim is stabbed and severely wounded and, although Andrews, Glassman, Shaun, Jordan, Jerome and Lea manage to save her life, Lim is left paralyzed from the waist down, likely as a result of Shaun's risky surgery to save her liver. After another surgery, Lim regains the ability to walk, albeit with the aid of a cane. In season 7, following the departure of Andrews, she and Glassman become the co-interim presidents of the hospital. Lim also no longer needs her cane, having fully recovered her ability to walk. In the series finale, Lim leaves the hospital to help out with medical treatment in Ukraine.
- Paige Spara as Lea Dilallo-Murphy (seasons 2–7; recurring, season 1), Shaun's love interest until she left to pursue her dream. Later after she returned, they decide to be platonic close friends and roommates, but they finally became a couple in the season 3 finale. In season 4, she and Shaun were expecting a baby girl together before she has a miscarriage due to a medical problem. In the season 4 finale, Lea gets engaged to Shaun. In the season 5 finale, they get married. In season 6, she and Shaun are expecting a baby boy and she gives birth to Steven in the finale. In a flashforward in the series finale, Shaun and Lea have a daughter together as well. Lea worked as an automotive engineer in the first two seasons before becoming Glassman's assistant in season 3. In season 4, she has become the head of the hospital's IT department.
- Jasika Nicole as Dr. Carly Lever (season 3; recurring seasons 1–2), the hospital's head and board certified pathologist introduced in season 1 who becomes Shaun's co-worker in season 2 and girlfriend in season 3. However, Carly breaks up with Shaun near the end of season 3 after realizing that he is in love with Lea.
- Bria Samoné Henderson as Dr. Jordan Allen (seasons 5–7; recurring, season 4), one of the new surgical residents who is also a successful inventor. She is initially one of Shaun's junior residents along with Olivia but is later assigned to Park along with Enrique. In a flashforward in the series finale, she is married to Danny Perez.
- Noah Galvin as Dr. Asher Wolke (seasons 5–7; recurring, season 4), he is one of the new surgical residents. He is a former Hasidic Jew and the son of a rabbi. He becomes an atheist after leaving his Hasidic community at eighteen and is also openly gay. He is a graduate of New York University, majoring in neurology. In season 6, after Shaun becomes an attending, Asher serves as one of his residents and begins to date nurse Jerome Martel. At the midpoint of season 7, Asher is murdered in a hate crime, just as he is about to get engaged to his boyfriend, Jerome Martel. Shortly before dying, he reverts to Judaism due to the influence of a rabbi who assures him he can be both Jewish and gay.
- Osvaldo Benavides as Dr. Mateo Rendón Osma (season 5; guest season 4), a Mexican-American surgeon whom the team meets in Guatemala and who decides to return to the United States afterwards. He begins forming a romantic relationship with Lim during their time together in Guatemala. He is soon transferred to San Jose General by Salen Morrison and loses touch with Lim shortly afterwards.
- Brandon Larracuente as Dr. Daniel "Danny" Perez (season 6; guest season 7) one of the new residents in season 6, who has an interest in Dr. Allen. However, he is revealed to be a former drug addict and thus cannot bring himself to pursue a relationship with her or anyone, fearing that this would get in the way of prioritizing his sobriety. At the end of the season, Danny suffers serious injuries after getting hit by a car and Jordan is forced to give him fentanyl to save his life. To avoid a relapse, Danny returns to Texas to recover with the help of his family. Danny returns in flashforwards in the series finale which reveals that he ultimately married Jordan.

=== Recurring ===
- Dylan Kingwell (season 1, 3 and 6), Logan Pierce (guest season 3) and Miles Marthaller (guest season 7) as Steve Murphy: Shaun's late younger brother, in flashbacks and later dreams and visions. He also portrays Evan Gallico, a boy in the present (Season 1) that resembles Shaun's brother and is suffering from stage 4 osteosarcoma.
- Elfina Luk as Nurse Dalisay Villanueva. In season 5, she is revealed to be domestically abused by her partner Owen, which makes her fail to catch up to her shifts. At the end of season 5, she is stabbed by Owen, but Andrews and Glassman manage to save her life. Owen is arrested for her attempted murder, but he expresses remorse for his actions to Asher Wolke, almost committing suicide by cop out of guilt. She is shown to have fully recovered and returned to work by the time of Lim's return three months later. In season 6, she and Andrews develop a romantic relationship.
- Teryl Rothery as Dr. Jan Lancaster (seasons 1–5, 7), an anesthesiologist and one of the doctors who is often seen helping out in surgery. In "Claire", her full name is given as Jan Lancaster.
- Marsha Thomason (season 1) and Golden Brooks (guest season 6) as Dr. Isabel Barnes, a doctor at St. Bonaventure and the ex-wife of Andrews. In season 1, they are shown to have trouble having kids and go to a therapist for help. At the end of season 4, during the trip to Guatemala, Andrews reveals that he and Isabel are getting a divorce as she is seeing someone else. In season 6, she returns to take over the case of a woman pregnant with sextuplets.
- Eric Winter as Dr. Matt Coyle (season 1), an attending surgeon who sexually harasses Claire when they work together on a case, resulting in Jared getting fired when he finds out and assaults him. He is also revealed to have done the same to other female employees who haven't spoken against him out of fear of risking their jobs. Without any evidence of his actions, Coyle is transferred to another department and two of his former residents, Morgan Reznick and Alex Park, are incorporated into Melendez's team. Jared also files a lawsuit against the hospital for racism when they refuse to rehire him, which he wins, but ends up losing the respect of Melendez and Andrews in the process.
- Chris D'Elia as Kenny (season 1): Shaun's new neighbor, who moves into Lea's apartment. Shaun mentioned that he was arrested when Lea returned.
- Kirby Morrow (season 1) and Michael Trucco (guest season 3 and 7) as Ethan Murphy, Shaun's abusive father. In season 3, he is reunited years later with his son when he is diagnosed with terminal pancreatic cancer to make amends, but after Shaun forgives him, Ethan throws hurtful words at Shaun before succumbing to his cancer thirty minutes later.
- Rebecca Husain (season 1), Joanna Going (guest season 3) and Patricia Cullen (guest season 7) as Marcie Murphy, Shaun's mother, who despite loving her son, never did anything to help Shaun and stand up to her abusive husband. In season 3, she is reunited with Shaun years later when Ethan is diagnosed with terminal pancreatic cancer. She ends up becoming a widow after Ethan dies, and Shaun cuts her out of his life for good. In season 5, after Shaun and Lea get engaged and start mailing the invitations for their wedding, Lea decides against inviting Marcie, not wanting Shaun to be reminded of his traumatic past.
- Sheila Kelley as hospital barista Debbie Wexler (seasons 1–4), a love interest for Dr. Glassman and later his fiancée and wife. After getting fired in the third season, she becomes Glassman's office manager. In season 4, they separate after a series of arguments. In real life, Kelley is married to Richard Schiff, who plays Glassman.
- Lisa Edelstein as Dr. Marina Blaize (season 2), an oncologist
- Holly Taylor (season 2) and Audrey Wise Alvarez (guest season 1 and 6) as Maddie Glassman, Aaron's estranged daughter who died of a drug overdose at 19.
- Daniel Dae Kim as Dr. Jackson Han (season 2), is a Neonatal Cardiac Surgeon and former Chief of Surgery of San Jose St. Bonaventure Hospital, who had trouble with Shaun's behavior and autism, especially his inability to communicate. Against Shaun's wishes, he has him transferred to Pathology where he can help patients without interacting with them, but Han fires him when he keeps on demanding his old job as a surgeon back. Andrews, as president of the hospital, eventually fires Han to save Shaun, but gets himself fired as well. Lim takes over his vacant position in season 3 and rehires Andrews as an attending surgeon.
- Sharon Leal as Breeze Browne (season 3; guest season 1–2), Dr. Claire Browne's mother who has bipolar disorder. She dies in a car crash in the season 3 episode "Claire."
- John Patrick Amedori as Dash Snyder (season 3; guest season 2), the husband of Claire's best friend and former college roommate Kayla. After Kayla dies from terminal ovarian cancer, he and Claire go out on a date, which were Kayla's final wishes when she first came to the hospital, but she doesn't reciprocate his feelings and eventually realizes she is in love with Melendez.
- Ricky He as Kellan Park (season 2–4), Dr. Park's estranged son
- Karin Konoval as Donna Petringa (season 2–4), a scrub nurse at St. Bonaventure who is often seen assisting in surgeries or monitoring patients. She dies of COVID-19 in "Frontline Part Two" in season four. She has been a nurse for forty years and has a son and granddaughter.
- April Cameron as Alyssa Hawks (seasons 3, 5–7; guest, season 4), a young nurse who works at the hospital. As revealed in season 6, she suffered from an addiction of some sort in the past as she attends Danny Perez's NA meeting.
- Brian Marc as Dr. Enrique "Ricky" Guerin (season 4): One of the new surgical residents who has a laid-back attitude and is polyamorous. He is assigned as one of Claire's junior residents. Enrique eventually decides to leave St. Bonaventure in order to join a program that will allow him to help out in needy areas of the world.
- Summer Brown as Dr. Olivia Jackson (season 4): One of the new surgical residents coming from Chicago initially who is double majoring in neonatal and Pediatric oncology. Her parents are also both surgeons. Olivia has both an MD and PhD from Harvard. She is also secretly the niece of Dr. Marcus Andrews. She is one of Shaun's junior residents before getting herself fired after falsely taking credit for leaking patient information, having never actually wanted to be a doctor in the first place.
- Marcuis Harris as Miles Brown (season 4), Claire's absentee father shows up out of nowhere in episode 13 of season 4: "Spilled Milk." In episode 18: "Forgive or Forget", they start to patch things up and form a relationship.
- Rachel Bay Jones as Salen Morrison (season 5), who buys St. Bonaventure at the start of season 5 through her corporative Ethicure company. She is described by executive producer David Shore as an "internal nemesis". In "Cheat Day", after firing nearly all of his colleagues for going against her, Andrews manages to convince her to stand down and she signs off the Ethicure ownership.
- Hollis Jane Andrews as Sophie (season 5), a documentarist with a form of dwarfism who takes an interest in Shaun and Lea
- Giacomo Baessato as Jerome Martel (season 5–7), a male nurse who begins dating Asher. As revealed in "Second Chances and Past Regrets", he has been HIV-positive for years. In "Who at Peace", he intended to propose to Asher, who was killed by two anti-semites that very same night. In the series finale, he is shown to have moved on from Asher's death and married another man.
- Savannah Welch as Dr. Danica "Danni" Powell (season 6), one of the new residents in season 6. She is a former US Navy Lieutenant who lost her right leg following a flight deck accident. In "The Good Boy", especially due to her constant pattern of disobedience, she is fired after an unauthorized surgery to save her friend on parole Vince, which she had dragged Asher into, who gets a two-month probation, along with Perez for his relapse.
- Michael Patrick Thornton as Dr. Clay Porter (season 6), a disabled pediatrician whom Powell sets Lim up with. They start a relationship and proposes to Lim, only for her to turn him down and suggest they move in together instead. In season 7, it is revealed that because of Lim's indecisiveness to marry Clay, he broke off the relationship and moved to Chicago for a fellowship.
- Kayla Cromer as Charlotte 'Charlie' Lukaitis (season 7), an autistic medical student who idolizes Shaun and was inspired to become a surgeon by the video of Shaun saving a young boy in the series premiere. While she isn't a savant like Shaun, she can hyperfocus. (Note: 31 minutes into episode 6 you can see her hyperfocus.) She seems to have a special interest in Taylor Swift. In a flashforward in the series finale, Charlie has become an attending at the hospital.
- Wavyy Jonez as Dominick 'Dom' Hubank (season 7), a medical student who is squeamish around blood. In a flashforward in the series finale, Dom has opened his own clinic and is no longer has a fear of blood.
- Bess Armstrong as Eileen Lim (season 7), Audrey's mother
- Ruby Kelley as Hannah (season 7), a patient with a drug addiction who bonds with Dr. Glassman as Hannah reminds Glassman of his deceased daughter Maddie. Ruby Kelley is the daughter of Richard Schiff and Sheila Kelley who play Dr. Glassman and his former wife Debbie.

=== Guests ===
- Paul Dooley as Glen (season 1, episode 7 "22 Steps"), a 72-year-old patient with a failing heart and suffering from constant pain
- Manny Jacinto as Bobby Ato (season 1, episode 10 "Sacrifice"), a charming and boisterous professional video gamer who requires surgery to repair torn ligaments in his left arm

== Episodes ==
Season	Episodes	Originally released		Rank	Average viewership (in millions)
Season	Episodes	First released	Last released	Rank	Average viewership (in millions)
1	18	September 25, 2017	March 26, 2018	7	15.61
2	18	September 24, 2018	March 11, 2019	12	12.20
3	20	September 23, 2019	March 30, 2020	11	10.82
4	20	November 2, 2020	June 7, 2021	19	8.16
5	18	September 27, 2021	May 16, 2022	27	7.05
6	22	October 3, 2022	May 1, 2023	30	6.24
7	10	February 20, 2024	May 21, 2024	41	5.11

== Production ==
=== Development ===
In May 2014, CBS Television Studios began development on an American remake of the hit South Korean medical drama Good Doctor with Daniel Dae Kim as producer. Kim explained the appeal of adapting the series as "something that can fit into a recognizable world with a breadth of characters that can be explored in the long run". The story of an autistic pediatric surgeon was to be set in Boston, and projected to air in August 2015, but CBS did not pick up the project, and it moved to Sony Pictures Television with a put pilot commitment from ABC in October 2016. The series was developed by David Shore who is credited as executive producer alongside Kim, Sebastian Lee and David Kim. ABC officially ordered the series to pilot in January 2017.

On May 11, 2017, ABC ordered to series as a co-production with Sony Pictures Television and ABC Studios, and it was officially picked up for a season of 18 episodes on October 3, 2017. On March 7, 2018, ABC renewed the series for a second season. On February 5, 2019, during the TCA press tour, ABC renewed the series for a third season which premiered on September 23, 2019. On February 10, 2020, ABC renewed the series for a fourth season which premiered on November 2, 2020. On August 6, 2020, it was reported that the fourth season opener is set to focus on the COVID-19 pandemic. On May 3, 2021, ABC renewed the series for a fifth season which premiered on September 27, 2021. On March 30, 2022, ABC renewed the series for a sixth season which premiered on October 3, 2022. On May 13, 2022, executive producer Liz Friedman was promoted to co-showrunner alongside Shore for the sixth season. On April 19, 2023, ABC renewed the series for a seventh season which premiered on February 20, 2024. On January 11, 2024, it was announced that the seventh season will be its final season.

=== Casting ===
On February 17, 2017, Antonia Thomas was cast as Dr. Claire Browne, a strong-willed and talented doctor who forms a special connection with Shaun. A week later, Freddie Highmore was cast in the lead role as Dr. Shaun Murphy, an autistic surgeon with savant syndrome, and Nicholas Gonzalez was cast as Dr. Neil Melendez, the supervisor of the hospital's surgical residents. The next month, Chuku Modu was cast as resident Dr. Jared Kalu (originally Dr. Jared Unger); Hill Harper as head of surgery Dr. Marcus Andrews (originally Dr. Horace Andrews); Irene Keng as resident Dr. Elle McLean; and Richard Schiff was cast as Dr. Aaron Glassman (originally Dr. Ira Glassman), the hospital president and Shaun's mentor. Schiff was shortly followed by Beau Garrett as hospital board member Jessica Preston and a friend of Dr. Glassman. In September 2017, Tamlyn Tomita was promoted to the principal cast as Allegra Aoki.

In April 2018, it was revealed that Will Yun Lee, Fiona Gubelmann, Christina Chang, and Paige Spara had been promoted to series regulars for the second season, after recurring in the first as Alex, Morgan, Audrey, and Lea, respectively. In addition, it was announced that Chuku Modu would not return for the second season. On September 19, 2018, it was announced that Beau Garrett had left the series ahead of the second-season premiere.

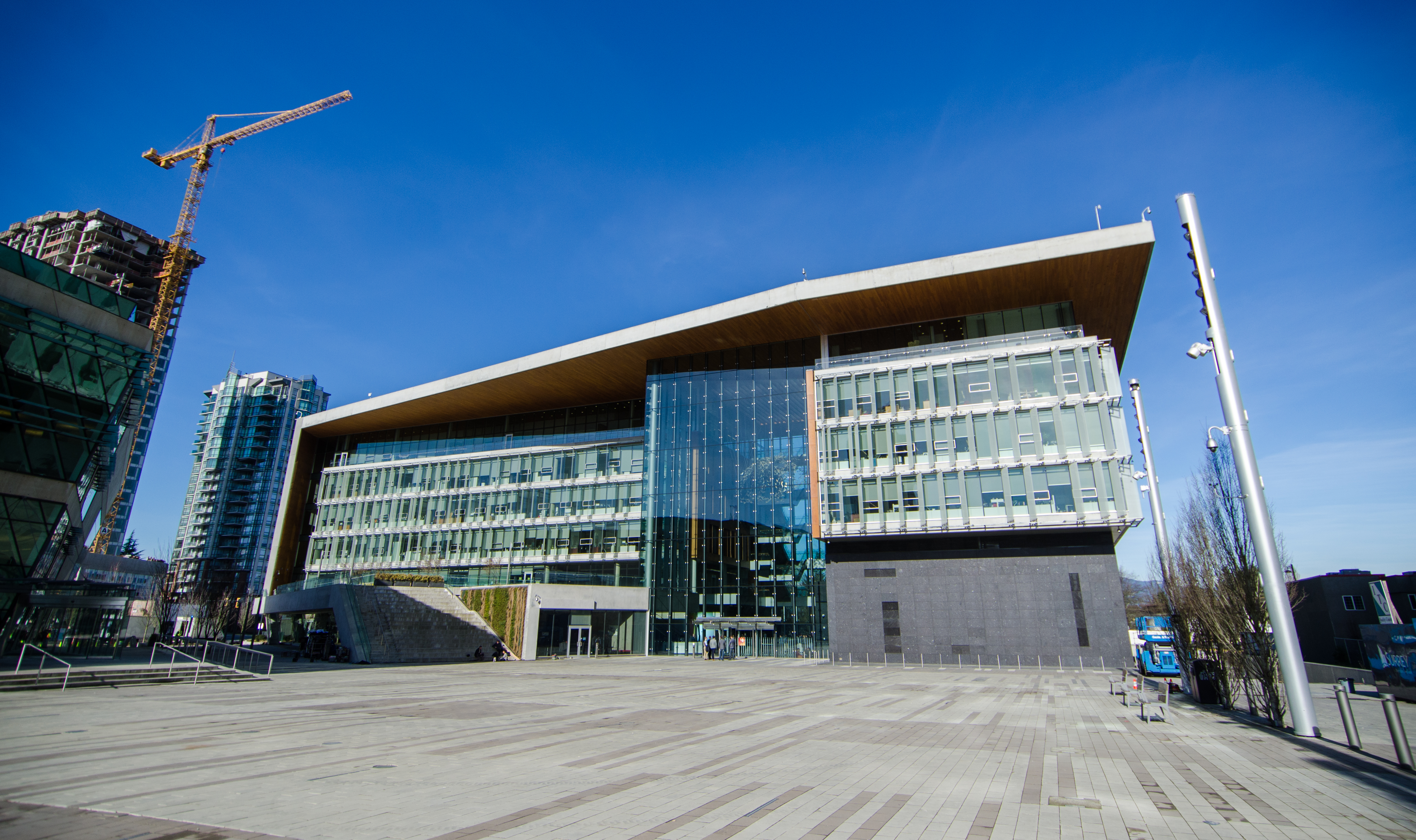
The Surrey, British Columbia city hall serves as the fictional San Jose St. Bonaventure Hospital in exterior shots.

In January 2019, it was announced that executive producer Daniel Dae Kim had been added in a recurring role during the second season. In July 2019, it was announced that Jasika Nicole was promoted to series regular for the third season. In October 2020, Noah Galvin, Summer Brown, Bria Samoné Henderson, and Brian Marc were cast in recurring roles for the fourth season. In May 2021, Galvin and Henderson were promoted to series regulars for the fifth season. In June 2021, Osvaldo Benavides was promoted to series regular for the fifth season. In April 2022, Hollis Jane Andrews was booked in a recurring role for the fifth season while Brandon Larracuente and Savannah Welch were cast in recurring roles for the sixth season. On November 8, 2022, Larracuente had been promoted to a series regular for the sixth season. On February 22, 2023, it was announced that Modu is set to reprise his role as Dr. Jared Kalu in recurring capacity for the sixth season. On April 28, 2023, it was reported that Larracuente would not return as a series regular for seventh season. On November 20, 2023, it was announced that Harper is not returning for the seventh season as he is bidding for a Senate seat. On January 9, 2024, it was reported that Modu is set to return as a series regular for the seventh season. On January 18, 2024, Kayla Cromer and Wavyy Jonez joined the cast in recurring capacities for the seventh season. On March 18, 2024, it was reported that Thomas and Larracuente are back to guest star while Ruby Kelley was cast in a recurring capacity for the final season.

=== Filming ===
Production on the pilot took place from March 21 to April 6, 2017, in Vancouver, British Columbia. Filming for the rest of the season began on July 26, 2017, and concluded on March 1, 2018. Filming for season two began on June 27, 2018, and concluded on February 12, 2019. Filming for the third season began on June 19, 2019, and concluded on March 3, 2020. Filming for the fourth season was originally scheduled to begin on August 4, 2020, and conclude on April 13, 2021, but was later postponed to September 2, 2020, and concluded on May 14, 2021. The fifth season began production on August 16, 2021, and concluded on April 29, 2022. Filming for the sixth season began on August 3, 2022, and concluded on April 6, 2023. Filming for the seventh and final season began on December 5, 2023, and concluded on April 5, 2024.

=== Music ===
Emmy-nominated Dan Romer serves as the primary composer for the series. He won an ASCAP Screen Music Award for his work on the show.

== Release ==
=== Broadcast ===
The Good Doctor began airing on September 25, 2017, on ABC in the United States, and on CTV in Canada. Sky Witness acquired the broadcast rights for the United Kingdom and Ireland. Seven Network airs the series in Australia. Colors Infinity acquired the rights to the series for the Indian Subcontinent in October 2017, airing each episode 24 hours after its US broadcast. Wowow, the largest Japanese private satellite and pay-per-view television network in Japan acquired the rights to broadcast the series beginning in April 2018. In the Netherlands, the series began airing on January 29, 2018, on RTL 4 and on video-on-demand service Videoland. In Italy, the series premiered on Rai 1 on July 17, 2018, setting a record of 5.2 million total viewers from 9:30 pm to 11:45 pm, reaching a share of 31,7% in the third episode and entering the Top 10 of Most Watched Foreign TV Series in Italy at No.5, an event since the leaderboard never changed again after the last entry on November 14, 2007, with an episode of House. In Brazil, the series was the first international production to be released at the TV Globo's video-on-demand service Globoplay. On August 27, the two first episodes was aired at Globo free-to-air television network to announce the launch of the series in the streaming service. On March 20, 2020, the Chilean public broadcaster Televisión Nacional de Chile announced the arrival of the series, with a "Coming soon" advertisement. In Bulgaria, the series began airing on July 13, 2020, on bTV.

=== Marketing ===
A full-length trailer was released for ABC's May 2017 Upfront presentation, which /Film's Ethan Anderton described the concept as feeling like "House meets Rain Man, that just might be enough to make it interesting". However, he questioned "how long can audiences be entranced by both the brilliance of [Highmore's] character's savant skills and the difficulties that come from his autism in the workplace." Daniel Fienberg of The Hollywood Reporter felt the trailer was "both kinda progressive and really dated". He added, "Too much felt on-the-nose—especially Hill Harper as the main character's detractor and Richard Schiff as his noble defender", while also commentating that "On-the-nose/premise is how you have to trailer a show like this, and maybe spaced out over 43 minutes it won't grate." Ben Travers and Steve Greene for IndieWire called it "a serious trailer for a serious subject. The first glimpse of Highmore's character hints that they're toeing the line between presenting a thoughtful depiction of his condition and using his perceptive abilities as a kind of secret weapon." The trailer had been viewed over 25.4 million times after a week of its release, including over 22 million views on Facebook.

The pilot was screened at ABC's PaleyFest event on September 9, 2017. On March 22, 2018, members of the cast as well as executive producers Shore and Kim attended the 35th annual PaleyFest LA to promote the series, along with a screening of the season finale of the first season.

=== Streaming ===
In May 2018, Hulu acquired the SVOD rights to new and past episodes of the series to air exclusively on Hulu, with future episodes becoming available the day after their original broadcast on ABC. In Australia the show's first 5 seasons streams on Netflix, Amazon Prime Video and Stan as well as Disney+ through its Star hub as the show is produced by ABC Signature and Sony Pictures Television and is part of the Disney/Sony deal that was struck in 2021. 6 Seasons also stream for free with ads on 7plus. In New Zealand, the show is available exclusively for streaming on Neon. The pilot episode was made available for viewing on February 5, 2018, with the newer episodes coming express from the US. In Canada, the series streams on Crave and Netflix. In India, the series streams on SonyLIV and Netflix.

=== Home media ===
Region 1

- Season One: August 7, 2018
- Season Two: August 6, 2019
- Season Three: August 4, 2020
- Season Four: August 31, 2021

Region 2 (UK)

- Complete Season One: October 8, 2018

Region 4 (Australia)

- Season One: August 15, 2018
- Season Two: July 10, 2019
- Season One–Season Two: July 10, 2019
- Season Three: July 15, 2020
- Season Four: August 25, 2021

== Reception ==
=== Ratings ===
Viewership and ratings per season of The Good Doctor
Season	Timeslot (ET)	Episodes	First aired		Last aired		TV season	Viewership rank	Avg. viewers (millions)	18–49 rank	Avg. 18–49 rating
Season	Timeslot (ET)	Episodes	Date	Viewers (millions)	Date	Viewers (millions)	TV season	Viewership rank	Avg. viewers (millions)	18–49 rank	Avg. 18–49 rating
1	Monday 10:00 p.m.	18	September 25, 2017	11.22	March 26, 2018	9.52	2017–18	7	15.61	9	3.4
2	Monday 10:00 p.m.	18	September 24, 2018	7.35	March 11, 2019	7.78	2018–19	12	12.20	12	2.4
3	Monday 10:00 p.m.	20	September 23, 2019	6.26	March 30, 2020	7.71	2019–20	11	10.82	13	1.8
4	Monday 10:00 p.m.	20	November 2, 2020	4.87	June 7, 2021	3.99	2020–21	19	8.16	22	1.2
5	Monday 10:00 p.m.	18	September 27, 2021	3.99	May 16, 2022	3.45	2021–22	27	7.05	33	0.8
6	Monday 10:00 p.m.	22	October 3, 2022	3.54	May 1, 2023	3.87	2022–23	30	8.20	34	0.9
7	Tuesday 10:00 p.m.	10	February 20, 2024	2.86	May 21, 2024	2.47	2023–24	41	5.11	74	0.4

The series premiere earned a 2.2/9 rating in the 18- to 49-year-old demographic, with 11.22 million total viewers, making it the most watched Monday drama debut on ABC in 21 years, since Dangerous Minds in September 1996, and the highest rated Monday drama in the 18–49 demographic in 8.5 years, since Castle in March 2009. Factoring live plus seven-day ratings, the pilot was watched by a total of 19.2 million viewers and set a record for DVR viewers with 7.9 million, surpassing the record of 7.67 million set by the pilot of Designated Survivor in 2016. According to TV Guide's November 13–26 issue, the October 9 episode attracted 18.2 million viewers, beating out both high-rated CBS shows NCIS and The Big Bang Theory for the most viewed primetime show that week.

The Good Doctor was the most watched show in Canada during the 2020-2021 broadcast season.

=== Critical response ===
On Rotten Tomatoes, the first season has an approval rating of 63% based on 43 reviews, with an average rating of 5.6/10. The website's consensus reads, "The Good Doctor's heavy-handed bedside manner undermines a solid lead performance, but under all the emotionally manipulative gimmickry, there's still plenty of room to improve." On Metacritic, it has a weighted average score of 53 out of 100 based on 15 critics, indicating "mixed or average reviews".

Giving his first impression of the series' pilot for TVLine, Matt Webb Mitovich stated, "The Good Doctor boasts great DNA... [and] has the potential to be a refreshingly thought-provoking hospital drama, based on the buttons pushed in the pilot alone." He enjoyed the "warm dynamic" of Schiff and Highmore, while describing Thomas' character as "our emotional 'in' to Shaun's distinct, distant world". He noted that "it takes a while to build up momentum", but concluded that "the very final scene packs quite a punch, as Dr. Murphy unwittingly puts a colleague on notice".

The New York Times television critic James Poniewozik notes in his Critic's Notebook column that, for the most part, the drama is a "hospital melodrama with whiz-bang medical science, a dash of intra-staff romance and shameless sentimentality." Discussing the main characters Shaun and Dr. Aaron Glassman (Richard Schiff), Poniewozik writes that "Mr. Schiff is convincing in the role and Mr. Highmore is striking in his."

Speaking of Freddie Highmore's Golden Globe nomination on Monday, December 11, 2017, for his role in The Good Doctor, Laura Bradley, writing for Vanity Fair, says: "... Freddie Highmore received the awards recognition that has long and unjustly eluded him..." Bradley feels that Highmore's performance has been "the central key" to the show's enormous success and while the show received lukewarm reviews, most critics have praised Highmore's work.

==== Portrayal of autism ====
Sarah Kurchak criticized the portrayal of autism in the series, describing it "as more of an amalgamation of non-autistic people’s misconceptions, fears, and fantasies about autism than a nuanced exploration of what it’s actually like to be [autistic]", noting that until the final season, none of the writers, cast, or consultants were autistic. Kurchak also accused the use of autism as a reason for Shaun demonstrating "a level of ignorance and transphobia toward a patient", noting the overlap between autistic, transgender, and non-binary people, a criticism noted by others too. Others have criticized a scene where Shaun accuses a Muslim patient of being a terrorist. Christy Duan, Vasilis K. Pozios and Praveen R. Kambam wrote in their critique for The Hollywood Reporter that The Good Doctor presents a belief that autistic individuals only benefit society when they possess savant abilities. A scene of Shaun having a meltdown was also criticized "about the way that the show represents people with autism".

=== Awards and nominations ===
Year	Award	Category	Recipient(s)	Result	Ref.
2018	Golden Globe Awards	Best Actor – Television Series Drama	Freddie Highmore	Nominated	
2018	Humanitas Prize	60-Minute Category	David Shore (for "Burnt Food")	Won	
2018	ASCAP Screen Music Awards	Top Network TV series	Dan Romer	Won	
2018	Banff Rockie Awards	Scripted Melodrama Series	The Good Doctor	Won	
2018	Banff Rockie Awards	The Hollywood Reporter Impact Award	The Good Doctor	Won	
2018	Teen Choice Awards	Choice Drama TV Actor	Freddie Highmore	Nominated	
2018	Seoul International Drama Awards	Best Series Drama	The Good Doctor	Nominated	
2018	Seoul International Drama Awards	Best Actor	Freddie Highmore	Nominated	
2018	Seoul International Drama Awards	Best Screenwriter	David Shore	Nominated	
2018	People's Choice Awards	The Male TV Star of 2018	Freddie Highmore	Nominated	
2019	Critics' Choice Television Awards	Best Actor in a Drama Series	Freddie Highmore	Nominated	
2019	Critics' Choice Television Awards	Best Supporting Actor in a Drama Series	Richard Schiff	Nominated	
2019	Humanitas Prize	60-Minute Category	David Shore and Lloyd Gilyard Jr. (for "More")	Nominated	
2019	GLAAD Media Awards	Outstanding Individual Episode (in a series without a regular LGBT character)	"She"	Nominated	
2019	Leo Awards	Best Dramatic Series	Shawn Williamson, Mike Listo, Daniel Dae Kim, David Shore, Freddie Highmore, Erin Gunn, Liz Friedman, Thomas Moran and David Hoselton	Nominated	
2019	Leo Awards	Best Guest Performance by a Male in a Dramatic Series	Ricky He (for "Quarantine")	Nominated	
2019	Monte-Carlo Television Festival	International TV Audience – Best Drama TV Series	The Good Doctor	Won	
2019	Seoul International Drama Awards	Most Popular Foreign Drama of the Year	The Good Doctor	Won	
2020	Critics' Choice Television Awards	Best Actor in a Drama Series	Freddie Highmore	Nominated	
2020	Leo Awards	Best Guest Performance by a Male in a Dramatic Series	Peter Benson (for "Risk and Reward")	Nominated	
2020	Leo Awards	Best Guest Performance by a Male in a Dramatic Series	Kiefer O'Reilly (for "SFAD")	Nominated	
2021	HCA TV Awards	Best Broadcast Network Series, Drama	The Good Doctor	Nominated	
2021	HCA TV Awards	Best Actor in a Broadcast Network or Cable Series, Drama	Freddie Highmore	Nominated	

== Canceled spin-off ==
In August 2022, it was reported that a planned spin-off titled The Good Lawyer was in development at ABC. It was introduced in a backdoor pilot during the sixth season. In January 2023, it was announced that ABC had received a backdoor pilot order for the spin-off with Kennedy McMann, Felicity Huffman and Bethlehem Million set to star.

In November 2023, as a consequence of the 2023 Writers Guild of America and SAG-AFTRA strikes, ABC announced that it would not be moving forward with the spin-off.

== Works cited ==
- "Profile 2021: Economic Report On The Screen-Based Media Production Industry In Canada" (PDF) (Press release) (25 ed.). Telefilm Canada. 2021. pp. 1–101.
