= Freddie Highmore =

English actor (born 1992)

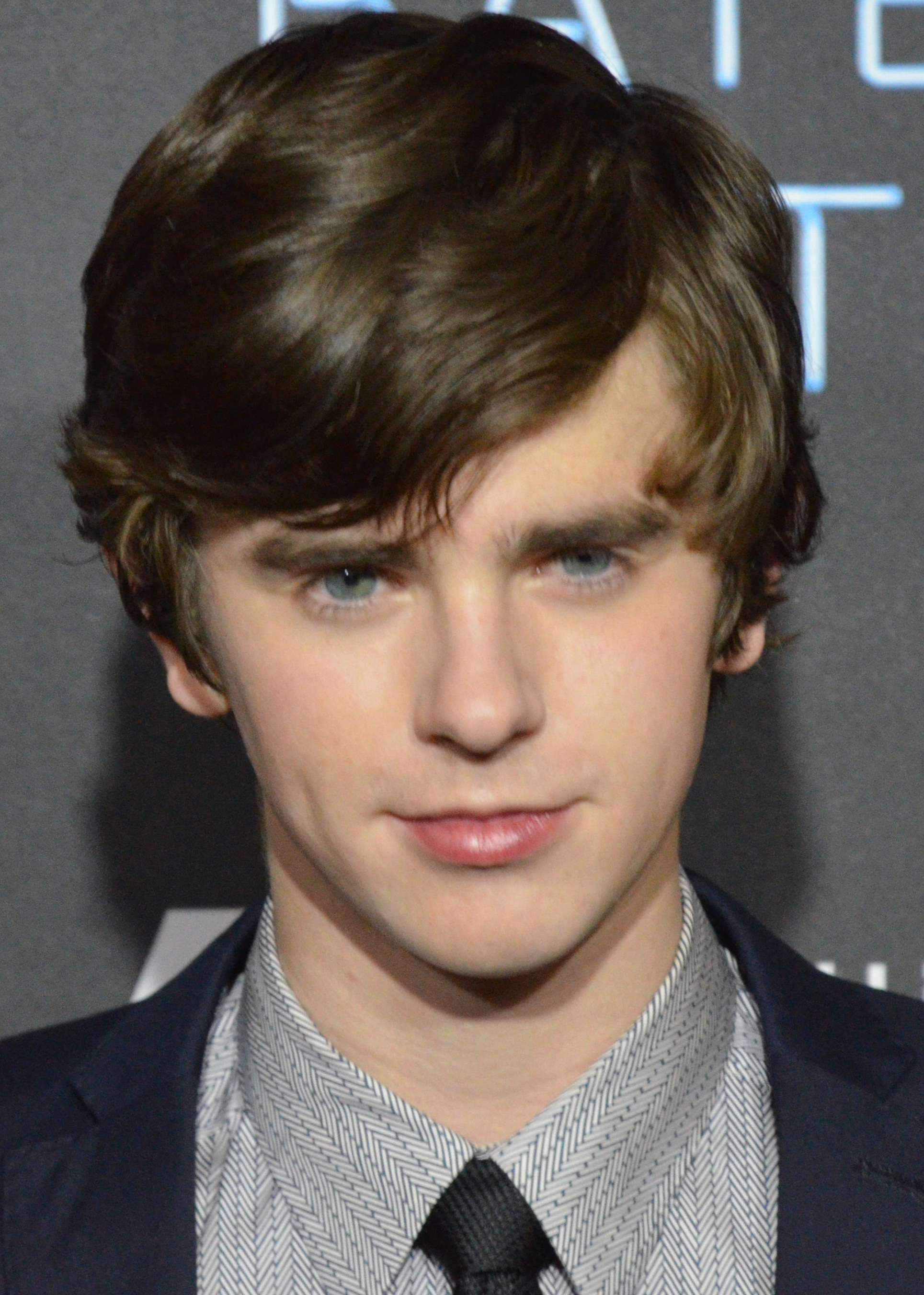
- Highmore in 2013
- Born: Alfred Thomas Highmore; 14 February 1992 (age 34); London, England
- Education: Emmanuel College, Cambridge
- Occupations: Actor; director
- Years active: 1999–present
- Father: Edward Highmore
- Awards: Full list

Alfred Thomas Highmore (born 14 February 1992) is an English actor. He is known for his starring roles beginning as a child, in the films Finding Neverland (2004), Charlie and the Chocolate Factory (2005), Arthur and the Invisibles (2006), August Rush (2007), The Spiderwick Chronicles (2008), and the voice of the titular robot boy in Astro Boy (2009). Highmore won two consecutive Critics' Choice Movie Awards for Best Young Performer and received two Screen Actors Guild Award nominations.

Highmore starred as Norman Bates in the drama-thriller series Bates Motel (2013–2017), for which he was nominated thrice for the Critics' Choice Television Award for Best Actor in a Drama Series and won a People's Choice Award. He also starred as Dr. Shaun Murphy in the ABC drama series The Good Doctor (2017–2024), on which he served as a producer, and received a Golden Globe Award for Best Actor nomination for his performance.

== Early life and education ==
Highmore was born on 14 February 1992 in Camden Town, London. His mother, Sue Latimer, is a talent agent whose clients include actors Daniel Radcliffe and Imelda Staunton. His father is former actor Edward Highmore.

Highmore was educated at the Brookland Junior and Infant school in Hampstead Garden Suburb near Golders Green in the London Borough of Barnet until age 11 and gained a scholarship to attend Highgate School, an independent school in Highgate, London.

In November 2007, Highmore moved to North London.

In 2008, Highmore received A* grades in English language and English literature, mathematics, Spanish, French, Latin, geography, biology, chemistry, and physics in his GCSE exams. In 2010, Highmore once again achieved A* grades in mathematics, further mathematics, French, and Spanish in his A-level exams.

From 2010 to 2014, Highmore attended Emmanuel College, Cambridge, where he earned a double first in Spanish and Arabic. Highmore also enrolled at the London School of Economics to study finance at summer school during the summer break at Cambridge in 2011. He worked at Gulf Bank in Kuwait as an intern in 2012 and at a law firm in Madrid during his year abroad while filming the first two seasons of Bates Motel, which made Highmore briefly consider becoming a lawyer after graduation.

== Career ==
=== Early career as a child actor (1999–2004) ===
Highmore began his acting career with small roles on television at age seven. He made his film debut in Coky Giedroyc's comedy Women Talking Dirty (1999), playing the son of a woman who has recently become estranged from her commitment-phobic French lover. In 2001, Highmore played a young King Arthur in the TNT miniseries The Mists of Avalon, a take on the Arthurian legends that depicted the women of Camelot as the real power behind the throne.

In 2001, in the BBC miniseries Happy Birthday Shakespeare, Highmore portrayed a young boy who dreams of moving his family to Stratford-upon-Avon. He has acted alongside members of his family in two separate films: Highmore and his brother played siblings in Women Talking Dirty, and he and his father played a father and son in Hallmark Entertainment's television film Jack and the Beanstalk: The Real Story (2001).

In 2004, Highmore returned to the big screen for the family adventure film Two Brothers, directed by Jean-Jacques Annaud. He played the son of a French administrator who refuses to believe that his new friend, a tiger cub named Sangha, might be dangerous after having tasted blood. Highmore next had a major role in the fantasy film Five Children and It (2004). That same year, he made his breakthrough with a critically acclaimed performance as Peter Llewelyn Davies in Marc Forster's semi-biographical film Finding Neverland. Highmore received several awards and nominations for the role, including a Critics' Choice Movie Award for Best Young Performer, and nominations for the Saturn Award for Best Performance by a Younger Actor and the Screen Actors Guild Award for Outstanding Performance by a Male Actor in a Supporting Role.

=== Young adult roles (2005–2011) ===
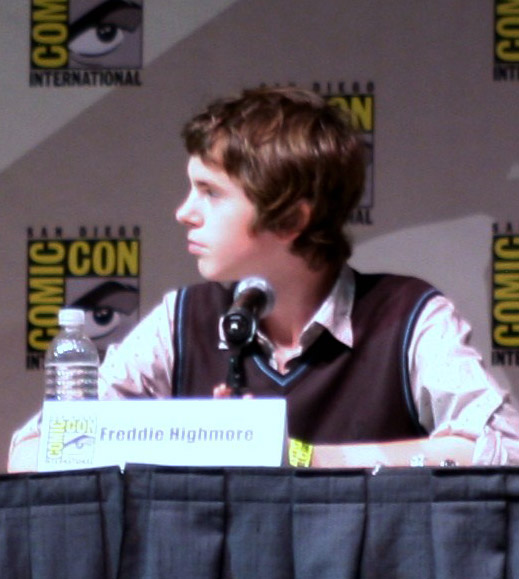
Highmore at San Diego Comic-Con in 2009

In 2005, Highmore portrayed the main role of Charlie Bucket in Tim Burton's musical fantasy film Charlie and the Chocolate Factory, adapted from the 1964 book by Roald Dahl. He was reportedly recommended by co-star Johnny Depp, with whom Highmore had worked in Finding Neverland; Depp had been impressed by the young actor's performance and thus put his name forward for the role. Highmore had not seen the original 1971 version of the film and decided not to see it until he was done filming so his portrayal of Charlie would not be influenced. For his role, Highmore again won the Critics' Choice Movie Award for Best Young Performer and was awarded the Satellite Award for Outstanding New Talent. Highmore also lent his voice to the film's 2005 video game.

Highmore next appeared as a young Max Skinner in Ridley Scott's comedy-drama film A Good Year, which was released in the UK on 27 October 2006. Also in 2006, he began portraying protagonist Arthur Montgomery in the live-action/animated fantasy adventure film Arthur and the Invisibles, released on 13 December. Two sequels followed: Arthur and the Revenge of Maltazard (2009) and Arthur 3: The War of the Two Worlds (2010). For the third film and the trilogy's accompanying video game, Highmore provided voice acting. In 2007, he lent his voice to the adventure fantasy film The Golden Compass and its 2007 companion video game. Highmore then portrayed the title character in the drama film August Rush (2007). The story follows a musical prodigy as he searches for his birth parents. This film received a wide release on 21 November 2007.

Highmore next starred in the dual role of American twins Simon Grace and Jared Grace in the fantasy adventure film The Spiderwick Chronicles (2008), based on the The Spiderwick Chronicles books by Tony DiTerlizzi and Holly Black. The film also had a 2008 video game in which Highmore reprised the characters of Simon and Jared in a voice role. That same year, Highmore provided voice acting for the role of Little Jack in the animated film A Fox's Tale (2008). In 2009, he voiced the titular character in the animated film Astro Boy and provided his voice to its accompanying video game, Astro Boy: The Video Game. Highmore then played the main role in Toast, a BBC biographical film about chef Nigel Slater, which aired on 30 December 2010. Also in 2010, he starred as Hally Ballard in the drama film Master Harold...and the Boys, based on the 1982 play by Athol Fugard. The following year, he co-starred in the romantic comedy-drama The Art of Getting By (2011).

=== Bates Motel and The Good Doctor (2012–2017) ===
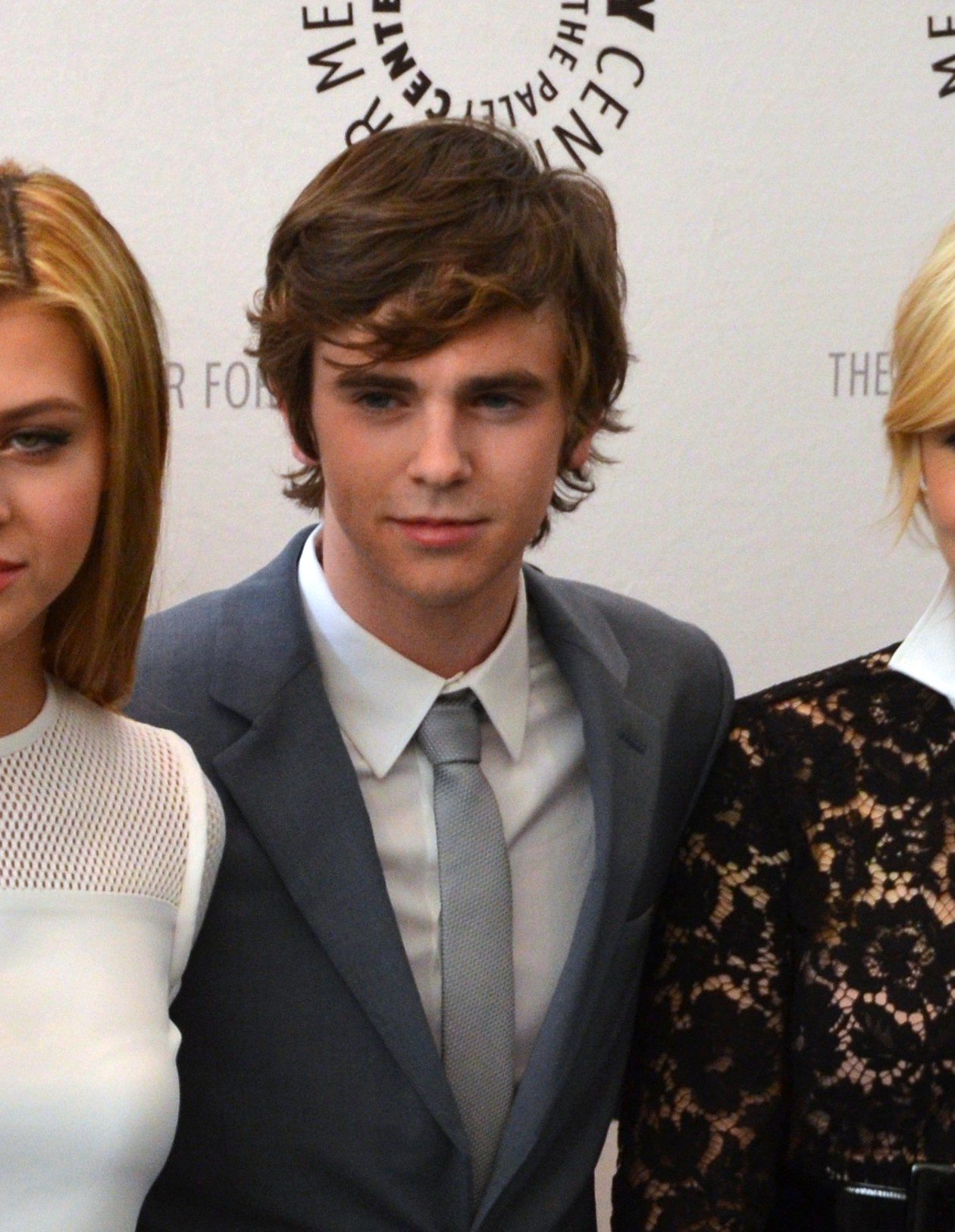
Highmore at PaleyFest for Bates Motel in 2013

In 2013, Highmore voiced the title character in the animated adventure film Justin and the Knights of Valour. From 2013 to 2017, he portrayed the role of Norman Bates in the A&E drama-thriller series Bates Motel, a prequel to the Alfred Hitchcock film Psycho that restarts the storyline in the present day. Highmore won a People's Choice Award in 2017 for his performance and received nominations for the Saturn Award for Best Actor on Television (2013), the Satellite Award for Best Actor – Television Series Drama (2013), and the Critics' Choice Television Award for Best Actor in a Drama Series (2014–2015 and 2017). He ventured into writing and directing during his time working on the series, writing the fourth-season episode "Unfaithful" and the fifth-season episode "Inseparable", and directing the fifth-season episode "The Body".

In 2015, he appeared in the Libertines' music video for "You're My Waterloo". The following year, Highmore starred in Stephen Poliakoff's BBC Two seven-part miniseries Close to the Enemy and Nick Hamm's political comedy-drama film The Journey.

In 2017, Highmore took on the lead role of Dr. Shaun Murphy, an autistic savant, in the ABC drama series The Good Doctor and was nominated for the Golden Globe Award for Best Actor in a Drama Series for his performance. He served as an executive producer and director for the show, and wrote the second-season episode "Hello".

Highmore voiced the Duke of Cheshire in the animated film The Canterville Ghost, which was announced in 2014 and released in 2023.

=== Later career and production work (2018–present) ===
In August 2018, Highmore formed his Sony-aligned production company, Alfresco Pictures, which aims to develop scripted series for broadcast, cable, streaming services, and international co-productions. Highmore subsequently starred as Stefano Giraldi in the historical drama series Leonardo and served as an executive producer on the series through Alfresco Pictures. In 2021, he starred as Thom Johnson in the heist film The Vault, which he also produced. Highmore continued to star as Shaun Murphy on The Good Doctor until the series concluded in May 2024 after seven seasons.

In 2025, Highmore directed the Fire Country episode "Eyes and Ears Everywhere". Later that year, Highmore starred as Edward in the Prime Video thriller series The Assassin, on which he also served as an executive producer. The series was renewed for a second series in February 2026.

In May 2026, Highmore and The Good Doctor creator David Shore co-created the Crave drama series I'm Not Here to Hurt You, with Highmore set to star in the lead role and serve as a non-writing executive producer. Also in 2026, filming began on the six-part period drama The Cadburys, produced by Fable Pictures in association with Highmore's Alfresco Pictures, with Highmore serving as an executive producer. The series is scheduled to launch on U in 2027.

== Personal life ==
Highmore lives in London and avoids social media. While on Bates Motel, Highmore developed a close friendship with co-star Vera Farmiga and became godfather to her son.

Apart from his native English, Highmore is fluent in French and Spanish, and proficient in Arabic.

In a September 2021 interview on Jimmy Kimmel Live!, Highmore revealed that he and his girlfriend had recently married.

== Filmography ==
=== Film ===
Year	Title	Role	Notes
1999	Women Talking Dirty	Sam	
2004	Two Brothers	Raoul Normandin	
2004	Finding Neverland	Peter Llewelyn Davies	
2004	Five Children and It	Robert	
2005	Charlie and the Chocolate Factory	Charlie Bucket	
2006	A Good Year	Young Max Skinner	
2006	Arthur and the Invisibles	Arthur Montgomery	
2007	August Rush	Evan Taylor / August Rush	
2007	The Golden Compass	Pantalaimon	Voice role
2008	The Spiderwick Chronicles	Jared and Simon Grace	Dual role
2008	A Fox's Tale	Little Jack	Voice role
2009	Astro Boy	Toby Tenma / Astro Boy	Voice role
2009	Arthur and the Revenge of Maltazard	Arthur Montgomery	
2010	Arthur 3: The War of the Two Worlds	Arthur Montgomery	
2010	Master Harold...and the Boys	Hally Ballard	
2011	The Art of Getting By	George Zinavoy	
2013	Justin and the Knights of Valour	Justin	Voice role
2016	The Journey	Jack the Driver	
2016	Almost Friends	Charlie Brenner	
2020	Dragon Rider	Ben	Voice role
2021	The Vault	Thom Johnson	Also producer
2023	The Canterville Ghost	The Duke of Cheshire	Voice role

=== Television ===
Year	Title	Role	Notes
2000	Happy Birthday Shakespeare	Steven Green	Television film
2001	The Mists of Avalon	Young Arthur	2 episodes
2001	Jack and the Beanstalk: The Real Story	Son at playground	2 episodes
2002	I Saw You	Oscar Bingley	Television film
2010	Toast	Nigel Slater	Television film
2013–2017	Bates Motel	Norman Bates	Main role; Writer: "Unfaithful", "Inseparable"; Director: "The Body"
2016	Close to the Enemy	Victor Ferguson	Main role
2017	Portrait Artist of the Year	Himself	Television competition
2017	Tour de Pharmacy	Adrian Baton	Television film
2017–2024	The Good Doctor	Shaun Murphy	Main role; executive producer; Writer: "Hello"; Director: "Risk and Reward", "Autopsy", "Decrypt", "Half Measures", "Skin in the Game"
2018	Taskmaster USA	Himself	Contestant
2021	Leonardo	Stefano Giraldi	Executive producer
2025	Fire Country	N/A	Director: "Eyes and Ears Everywhere"
2025–present	The Assassin	Edward	Executive producer
TBA	I'm Not Here to Hurt You	TBA	Main role; co-creator; executive producer

=== Video games ===
Year	Title	Role
2005	Charlie and the Chocolate Factory	Charlie Bucket
2007	Arthur and the Invisibles	Arthur Montgomery
2007	The Golden Compass	Pantalaimon
2008	The Spiderwick Chronicles	Jared and Simon Grace
2009	Astro Boy: The Video Game	Toby Tenma / Astro Boy

=== Music videos ===
Year	Title	Artist
2004	"Girls"	The Prodigy
2015	"You're My Waterloo"	The Libertines
